= Glamorgan County Cricket Club in 2025 =

Glamorgan County Cricket Club
2025 season
- Coach: (England) Richard Dawson
- Captain: (England) Sam Northeast (red ball) (Wales) Kiran Carlson (white ball)
- Overseas player: (South Africa) Colin Ingram (Sri Lanka) Asitha Fernando (4 April – 26 May; 22 July – 27 September) (Australia) Marnus Labuschagne (16 May – 26 May) (Australia) Hayden Kerr (June – July) (Australia) Matthew Kuhnemann (23–26 May) (Pakistan) Imad Wasim (T20 Blast)
- Ground(s): Sophia Gardens, Cardiff; The Gnoll, Neath
- County Championship: 2nd, Division 2 (promoted)
- One-Day Cup: 9th, Group A
- T20 Blast: 5th, South Group
- Most runs: FC: Colin Ingram (1,076); LA: Asa Tribe (401); T20: Colin Ingram (338)
- Most wickets: FC: Timm van der Gugten (34); LA: Zain-ul-Hassan (6); Ned Leonard (6); T20: Ned Leonard (20); Dan Douthwaite (20)
- Most catches: FC: Kiran Carlson (19); LA: Kiran Carlson (6); T20: Asa Tribe (10)
- Most wicket-keeping dismissals: FC: Chris Cooke (36 ct + 3 st); LA: Alex Horton (3 ct + 0 st); Will Smale (3 ct + 0 st); T20: Alex Horton (7 ct + 0 st)

The 2025 season is Glamorgan County Cricket Club's 138th year in existence and their 105th as a first-class cricket county. They are playing in the Second Division of the County Championship; they finished in second place in the division and were promoted to the top flight for the first time since 2005. They played in the South Group of the T20 Blast, and in Group A of the One-Day Cup. They began the defence of their 2024 One-Day Cup title with two matches at The Gnoll in Neath, the fourth year in a row they played at the ground; however, they managed just one win in the 2025 competition and finished bottom of Group A.

It is the team's first season under head coach Richard Dawson, who was appointed on a one-year contract in January 2025 following the sacking of Grant Bradburn for discriminatory misconduct in December 2024. David Harrison took over coaching duties for the One-Day Cup in August while Dawson was working for Welsh Fire in The Hundred. Dawson signed a new three-year contract with Glamorgan on 21 August.

Sam Northeast continued as red-ball captain, while Kiran Carlson retained the white-ball captaincy. South African Colin Ingram returned as one of the team's overseas players, along with Sri Lankan bowler Asitha Fernando, who joined for the first seven games of the County Championship season; Fernando returned to Glamorgan on 21 July for their final five Championship matches. On 5 May 2025, Australian batter Marnus Labuschagne, who had played for Glamorgan in five previous seasons, was reported to be returning for two County Championship matches in May; the club confirmed his return three days later. On 14 May, they signed Australian all-rounder Hayden Kerr for County Championship and T20 Blast fixtures in June and July. On 22 May 2025, they signed Australian spin bowler Matthew Kuhnemann to play in their County Championship match against Middlesex, which began on 23 May, as a replacement for Ben Kellaway. Glamorgan and Northeast opened talks over a new contract in August 2025, but he ultimately signed for his home county of Kent, bringing an end to a four-year spell in Wales.

== Pre-season and friendlies ==
Glamorgan are playing two three-day matches in preparation for the start of the County Championship season, beginning behind closed doors at home to Worcestershire on 24–26 March before another home game against the Cardiff MCC University team, beginning on 30 March. They also played a Twenty20 game against Wiltshire at Swindon on 30 May ahead of the start of the 2025 T20 Blast campaign two days later.

=== Glamorgan v Worcestershire (24–26 March) ===
24–26 March
Report
Scorecard

| Worcestershire | v | Glamorgan |
| 334/8d (80 overs); Jake Libby 75 (127); Tom Bevan 2/30 (8 overs) | | 185 (63.3 overs); Colin Ingram 49 (72); Tom Taylor 4/21 (14 overs) |
| 157/8d (48 overs); Gareth Roderick 39* (83); Ben Morris 2/11 (6 overs) | | 203/7 (56 overs); Kiran Carlson 53* (86); Brett D'Oliveira |

Match drawn
Sophia Gardens, Cardiff
Umpires: Simon Widdup and Jon Kinsey

- No toss.
- 14 players per side (11 fielding).

=== MCC University Match: Glamorgan v Cardiff MCCU (30 March – 1 April) ===
30 March – 1 April
Report
Scorecard

| Glamorgan | v | Cardiff MCCU |
| 363/5d (78 overs); Sam Northeast 137 (158); Asim Hameed 2/40 (10 overs) | | 450/9d (93 overs); Nic Halstead-Cleak 123 (128); Kiran Carlson 3/86 (12 overs) |
| 352/6d (78 overs); Sam Northeast 98* (129); Asim Hameed 2/43 (10 overs) |

Match drawn
Sophia Gardens, Cardiff
Umpires: Alex Wharf and Sam Hollingshead

- Glamorgan won the toss and elected to bat.
- 13 players per side (11 fielding).

=== NCCA Showcase Match: Wiltshire v Glamorgan (30 May) ===
30 May
Scorecard

| Glamorgan; 165/8 (20 overs) | v | Wiltshire; 165/7 (20 overs) |
| Ned Leonard 47* (18); Alfie Johnson 2/15 (4 overs) | | Jake Goodwin 48 (32); Mason Crane 2/21 (4 overs) |

Match tied (Glamorgan won the Super Over)
County Cricket Ground, Swindon
Umpires: Nick Piper and Kashif Sumra

- Wiltshire won the toss and elected to field.
- Glamorgan won the Super Over (16/0 – 13/0).

== County Championship ==
=== Matches ===
==== Glamorgan v Leicestershire (4–7 April) ====
4–7 April
Scorecard

| Glamorgan | v | Leicestershire |
| 229 (74.3 overs); Chris Cooke 55 (101); Ian Holland 3/40 (14 overs) | | 427 (118 overs); Lewis Hill 96 (125); Andy Gorvin 4/51 (22 overs) |
| 248 (86 overs); Kiran Carlson 113 (214); Ian Holland 4/46 (22 overs) | | 53/0 (6 overs); Sol Budinger 32* (20) |

Leicestershire won by 10 wickets
Sophia Gardens, Cardiff
Umpires: Mark Newell and Tom Lungley

- Leicestershire won the toss and elected to field.
- Points: Leicestershire 23, Glamorgan 2.

==== Gloucestershire v Glamorgan (11–14 April) ====
11–14 April
Scorecard

| Gloucestershire | v | Glamorgan |
| 546 (137.5 overs); Cameron Bancroft 163 (267); Ned Leonard 3/122 (24 overs) | | 385 (107.5 overs); Colin Ingram 103 (174); Zaman Akhter 5/85 (20.5 overs) |
| | | 288/4 (f/o) (88.3 overs); Colin Ingram 77* (162); Matthew Taylor 2/47 (15 overs) |

Match drawn
County Ground, Bristol
Umpires: Naeem Ashraf and Paul Baldwin

- Glamorgan won the toss and elected to field.
- Gloucestershire 15, Glamorgan 13.

==== Middlesex v Glamorgan (18–21 April) ====
18–21 April
Scorecard

| Glamorgan | v | Middlesex |
| 199 (69.5 overs); Zain-ul-Hassan 65 (124); Toby Roland-Jones 3/44 (15.5 overs) | | 470/9d (146 overs); Max Holden 107 (198); Ben Kellaway 4/61 (18 overs) |
| 329 (108 overs); Chris Cooke 69 (151); Toby Roland-Jones 3/68 (23 overs) | | 59/1 (7.5 overs); Leus du Plooy 27* (21); Ned Leonard 1/29 (3.5 overs) |

Middlesex won by 9 wickets
Lord's, London
Umpires: Ben Peverall and Neil Pratt

- Middlesex won the toss and elected to field.
- Points: Middlesex 21, Glamorgan 1.

==== Glamorgan v Derbyshire (2–5 May) ====
2–5 May
Scorecard

| Glamorgan | v | Derbyshire |
| 431 (127.4 overs); Colin Ingram 81 (165); David Lloyd 2/18 (7.4 overs) | | 350 (107 overs); Luis Reece 73* (184); Andy Gorvin 5/85 (22 overs) |
| 256/7d (82 overs); Ben Kellaway 74 (117); Blair Tickner 3/44 (19 overs) | | 308/9 (65 overs); Martin Andersson 78 (95); Ben Kellaway 5/101 (25 overs) |

Match drawn
Sophia Gardens, Cardiff
Umpires: Mark Newell and Tom Lungley

- Derbyshire won the toss and elected to field.
- Points: Glamorgan 14, Derbyshire 13.

==== Kent v Glamorgan (9–12 May) ====
9–12 May
Scorecard

| Glamorgan | v | Kent |
| 549/9d (132 overs); Ben Kellaway 181* (228); Kashif Ali 4/92 (24 overs) | | 212 (74.1 overs); Chris Benjamin 94* (171); Timm van der Gugten 3/23 (12 overs) |
| | | 176 (f/o) (48.2 overs); Tawanda Muyeye 41 (56); Asitha Fernando 3/18 (7 overs) |

Glamorgan won by an innings and 161 runs
St Lawrence Ground, Canterbury
Umpires: Mark Newell and Sue Redfern

- Kent won the toss and elected to field.
- Ekansh Singh (Kent) made his first-class debut.
- Points: Glamorgan 23, Kent 2.

==== Glamorgan v Northamptonshire (16–20 May) ====
16–20 May
Scorecard

| Northamptonshire | v | Glamorgan |
| 185 (65.2 overs); Luke Procter 61 (134); Asitha Fernando 3/28 (11.2 overs) | | 424 (107.1 overs); Ben Kellaway 95 (104); Justin Broad 3/82 (20 overs) |
| 304 (95.4 overs); Saif Zaib 71 (115); Asitha Fernando 3/42 (17.4 overs) | | 66/2 (16.2 overs); Asa Tribe 32* (44); Ben Sanderson 2/14 (6 overs) |

Glamorgan won by 8 wickets
Sophia Gardens, Cardiff
Umpires: Hassan Adnan and Surendiran Shanmugam

- Northamptonshire won the toss and elected to bat.
- Points: Glamorgan 23, Northamptonshire 3.

==== Glamorgan v Middlesex (23–26 May) ====
23–26 May
Scorecard

| Glamorgan | v | Middlesex |
| 383 (115.4 overs); Sam Northeast 122 (262); Ryan Higgins 5/59 (24.4 overs) | | 155 (52 overs); Max Holden 42 (60); Andy Gorvin 4/39 (10 overs) |
| 8/0 (2.2 overs); Asa Tribe 6* (9) | | 235 (f/o) (58.3 overs); Sam Robson 66 (58); Matthew Kuhnemann 6/53 (22.3 overs) |

Glamorgan won by 10 wickets
Sophia Gardens, Cardiff
Umpires: Ian Blackwell and James Tredwell

- Middlesex won the toss and elected to field.
- Points: Glamorgan 22, Middlesex 2.

==== Leicestershire v Glamorgan (22–25 June) ====
22–25 June
Scorecard

| Glamorgan | v | Leicestershire |
| 353 (110.2 overs); Asa Tribe 107 (173); Ben Green 3/55 (24 overs) | | 576/7d (129 overs); Sol Budinger 118 (102); Zain-ul-Hassan 2/90 (27 overs) |
| 342/6d (121 overs); Sam Northeast 139 (274); Logan van Beek 2/47 (18 overs) |

Match drawn
Grace Road, Leicester
Umpires: Naeem Ashraf and Rob White

- Glamorgan won the toss and elected to bat.
- Points: Leicestershire 16, Glamorgan 13.

==== Glamorgan v Gloucestershire (29 June – 2 July) ====
29 June – 2 July
Scorecard

| Gloucestershire | v | Glamorgan |
| 380 (120.1 overs); James Bracey 133 (197); Timm van der Gugten 4/61 (26 overs) | | 528 (151.1 overs); Ben Kellaway 139 (239); Graeme van Buuren 3/87 (35 overs) |
| 255/7d (95 overs); Miles Hammond 84 (170); Ben Kellaway 6/111 (38 overs) |

Match drawn
Sophia Gardens, Cardiff
Umpires: Anthony Harris and Chris Watts

- Glamorgan won the toss and elected to field.
- Points: Glamorgan 14, Gloucestershire 12.

==== Glamorgan v Kent (22–25 July) ====
22–25 July
Scorecard

| Kent | v | Glamorgan |
| 155 (53.2 overs); Daniel Bell-Drummond 42 (107); Timm van der Gugten 3/27 (15 overs) | | 327 (100.5 overs); Ben Kellaway 90 (174); Wes Agar 4/58 (17 overs) |
| 360 (114.3 overs); Harry Finch 68 (125); Kiran Carlson 3/24 (5 overs) | | 189/5 (45.5 overs); Kiran Carlson 89* (115); Matt Parkinson 4/82 (18.5 overs) |

Glamorgan won by 5 wickets
Sophia Gardens, Cardiff
Umpires: Chris Watts and Paul Baldwin

- Glamorgan won the toss and elected to field.
- Points: Glamorgan 21, Kent −5.
- Kent were deducted eight points for dissent by captain Daniel Bell-Drummond.

==== Lancashire v Glamorgan (29 July – 1 August) ====
29 July – 1 August
Scorecard

| Glamorgan | v | Lancashire |
| 261 (97.2 overs); Kiran Carlson 77 (129); Chris Green 6/82 (34 overs) | | 137 (52.3 overs); Josh Bohannon 32 (72); Mason Crane 6/19 (10.3 overs) |
| 348/7d (76 overs); Sam Northeast 132 (215); Chris Green 3/93 (18 overs) | | 318 (74.5 overs); Luke Wells 102 (117); Ben Kellaway 3/82 (25 overs) |

Glamorgan won by 154 runs
Old Trafford Cricket Ground, Manchester
Umpires: Ben Peverall and David Millns

- Glamorgan won the toss and elected to bat.
- Points: Glamorgan 20, Lancashire 3.

==== Northamptonshire v Glamorgan (8–11 September) ====
8–11 September
Scorecard

| Glamorgan | v | Northamptonshire |
| 467 (121.4 overs); Asa Tribe 206 (297); Nirvan Ramesh 3/42 (14.4 overs) | | 413/9d (92.4 overs); Saif Zaib 145 (186); Mason Crane 5/126 (23 overs) |
| 241/7 (80 overs); Colin Ingram 55 (85); Calvin Harrison 3/46 (23 overs) |

Match drawn
County Cricket Ground, Northampton
Umpires: Chris Watts and Neil Pratt

- Glamorgan won the toss and elected to bat.
- Points: Glamorgan 15, Northamptonshire 14.
- Ben Whitehouse and Nirvan Ramesh (both Northants) made their first-class debuts.

==== Derbyshire v Glamorgan (15–18 September) ====
15–18 September
Scorecard

| Glamorgan | v | Derbyshire |
| 259 (88.3 overs); Kiran Carlson 94 (178); Luis Reece 4/67 (22.3 overs) | | 17/0 (5 overs); Aneurin Donald 10* (16) |

Match drawn
County Cricket Ground, Derby
Umpires: Steve O'Shaughnessy and Surendiran Shanmugam

- Derbyshire won the toss and elected to field.
- No play was possible on day 1, day 3 or day 4 due to rain.
- Amrit Basra (Derbs) made his first-class debut.

Glamorgan's draw with Derbyshire, along with Middlesex's draw with Lancashire and Gloucestershire's inability to pick up any batting points against Northamptonshire, meant they could no longer be caught in second place, meaning that they would be promoted to the First Division for the first time since 2005.

==== Glamorgan v Lancashire (24–27 September) ====
24–27 September
Scorecard

| Glamorgan | v | Lancashire |
| 265 (73.2 overs); Timm van der Gugten 53 (122); Tom Bailey 5/51 (19.2 overs) | | 374 (96.4 overs); Luke Wells 78 (157); Timm van der Gugten 5/85 (23.4 overs) |
| 241 (85 overs); Chris Cooke 52* (104); George Balderson 4/75 (25 overs) | | 134/3 (20 overs); Keaton Jennings 47 (33); Mason Crane 2/26 (5 overs) |

Lancashire won by 7 wickets
Sophia Gardens, Cardiff
Umpires: Peter Hartley and Tom Lungley

- Lancashire won the toss and elected to field.
- Points: Lancashire 22, Glamorgan 4.

=== Standings ===
| Pos | Team | Pld | W | L | T | D | A | Bat | Bowl | Ded | Pts | |
|---|---|---|---|---|---|---|---|---|---|---|---|---|
| 1 | Leicestershire (P) | 13 | 6 | 1 | 0 | 6 | 0 | 42 | 32 | 0 | 218 | Promotion to Division 1 |
| 2 | Glamorgan (P) | 14 | 5 | 3 | 0 | 6 | 0 | 32 | 34 | 1 | 193 | Promotion to Division 1 |
| 3 | Lancashire | 14 | 3 | 3 | 0 | 8 | 0 | 26 | 37 | 0 | 175 | |
| 4 | Derbyshire | 13 | 2 | 2 | 0 | 9 | 0 | 27 | 33 | 0 | 164 | |
| 5 | Gloucestershire | 13 | 2 | 3 | 0 | 8 | 0 | 34 | 35 | 0 | 165 | |
| 6 | Middlesex | 13 | 4 | 4 | 0 | 5 | 0 | 22 | 33 | 0 | 159 | |
| 7 | Northamptonshire | 13 | 2 | 5 | 0 | 6 | 0 | 27 | 33 | 0 | 140 | |
| 8 | Kent | 13 | 2 | 5 | 0 | 6 | 0 | 17 | 30 | 14 | 113 | |

Source: ESPNcricinfo, ECB, BBC
(P) Promoted

== One-Day Cup ==
=== Matches ===
==== Glamorgan v Hampshire (5 August) ====
5 August
Scorecard

| Hampshire; 324/6 (50 overs) | v | Glamorgan; 252 (39.5 overs) |
| Nick Gubbins 144* (147); Ned Leonard 3/54 (7 overs) | | Kiran Carlson 135 (92); Manny Lumsden 3/64 (5 overs) |

Hampshire won by 72 runs
The Gnoll, Neath
Umpires: Ben Peverall and Surendiran Shanmugam

- Glamorgan won the toss and elected to field.
- Points: Hampshire 4, Glamorgan 0.
- Andrew Neal, Ben Mayes, Manny Lumsden (all Hants) and Romano Franco (Glam) made their List A debuts.

==== Glamorgan v Derbyshire (7 August) ====
7 August
Scorecard

| Glamorgan | v | Derbyshire |

Match abandoned without a ball bowled
The Gnoll, Neath

- No toss.
- Points: Glamorgan 2, Derbyshire 2.

==== Surrey v Glamorgan (13 August) ====
13 August
Scorecard

| Glamorgan; 308/7 (50 overs) | v | Surrey; 146/5 (15.3 overs) |
| Will Smale 105* (106); Nathan Barnwell 3/55 (10 overs) | | Ben Foakes 43* (17); Andy Gorvin 2/31 (3 overs) |

Surrey won by 5 wickets (D/L/S method)
The Oval, London
Umpires: Ben Debenham and James Tredwell

- Surrey won the toss and elected to field.
- Points: Surrey 4, Glamorgan 0.

==== Gloucestershire v Glamorgan (15 August) ====
15 August (D/N)
Scorecard

| Glamorgan; 288/9 (50 overs) | v | Gloucestershire; 289/5 (46.4 overs) |
| Eddie Byrom 94 (108); Graeme van Buuren 3/33 (10 overs) | | Cameron Bancroft 143* (144); James Harris 2/45 (10 overs) |

Gloucestershire won by 5 wickets
County Ground, Bristol
Umpires: Ian Blackwell and Sue Redfern

- Gloucestershire won the toss and elected to field.
- Points: Gloucestershire 4, Glamorgan 0.

==== Glamorgan v Nottinghamshire (17 August) ====
17 August
Scorecard

| Glamorgan; 278/9 (50 overs) | v | Nottinghamshire; 282/3 (46.3 overs) |
| Eddie Byrom 62 (72); Robert Lord 2/50 (10 overs) | | Jack Haynes 124 (103); Asa Tribe 1/17 (3 overs) |

Nottinghamshire won by 7 wickets
Sophia Gardens, Cardiff
Umpires: Mike Burns and Sam Hollingshead

- Nottinghamshire won the toss and elected to field.
- Points: Nottinghamshire 4, Glamorgan 0.
- Byron Hatton-Lowe (Notts) made his List A debut.

==== Essex v Glamorgan (20 August) ====
20 August
Scorecard

| Essex; 371/6 (50 overs) | v | Glamorgan; 181 (32.2 overs) |
| Tom Westley 141 (113); Zain-ul-Hassan 3/60 (10 overs) | | Asa Tribe 71 (79); Simon Harmer 5/47 (10 overs) |

Essex won by 190 runs
County Cricket Ground, Chelmsford
Umpires: James Middlebrook and Simon Widdup

- Essex won the toss and elected to bat.
- Points: Essex 4, Glamorgan 0.

==== Worcestershire v Glamorgan (22 August) ====
22 August
Scorecard

| Glamorgan; 297/7 (50 overs) | v | Worcestershire; 298/5 (48.2 overs) |
| Asa Tribe 122* (125); Brett D'Oliveira 2/46 (8 overs) | | Rob Jones 110* (108); James Harris 2/57 (9 overs) |

Worcestershire won by 5 wickets
New Road, Worcester
Umpires: Paul Baldwin and Tom Lungley

- Worcestershire won the toss and elected to field.
- Points: Worcestershire 4, Glamorgan 0.

==== Glamorgan v Leicestershire (26 August) ====
26 August
Scorecard

| Leicestershire; 274 (49.4 overs) | v | Glamorgan; 278/3 (45.4 overs) |
| Lewis Hill 81 (88); Tom Norton 3/41 (10 overs) | | Asa Tribe 131* (132); Alex Green 2/71 (9 overs) |

Glamorgan won by 7 wickets
Sophia Gardens, Cardiff
Umpires: Mohammed Waseem and Neil Bainton

- Glamorgan won the toss and elected to field.
- Points: Glamorgan 4, Leicestershire 0.
- Tom Norton (Glam) made his List A debut.

=== Standings ===
| Pos | Team | Pld | W | L | T | NR | Ded | Pts | NRR |
|---|---|---|---|---|---|---|---|---|---|
| 1 | Worcestershire Rapids | 8 | 6 | 1 | 1 | 0 | 0 | 26 | 0.452 |
| 2 | Hampshire | 8 | 6 | 2 | 0 | 0 | 0 | 24 | 0.704 |
| 3 | Gloucestershire | 8 | 6 | 2 | 0 | 0 | 0 | 24 | 0.330 |
| 4 | Essex | 8 | 5 | 3 | 0 | 0 | 0 | 20 | 1.352 |
| 5 | Nottinghamshire Outlaws | 8 | 3 | 4 | 1 | 0 | 0 | 14 | −0.582 |
| 6 | Surrey | 8 | 3 | 5 | 0 | 0 | 0 | 12 | −1.915 |
| 7 | Leicestershire Foxes | 8 | 2 | 5 | 1 | 0 | 0 | 10 | 0.244 |
| 8 | Derbyshire Falcons | 8 | 1 | 5 | 1 | 1 | 0 | 8 | −0.113 |
| 9 | Glamorgan | 8 | 1 | 6 | 0 | 1 | 0 | 6 | −0.947 |

Source: BBC Sport, ECB, ESPNcricinfo.
- Advanced directly to the semi-finals
- Advanced to the quarter-finals

== T20 Blast ==
=== Matches ===
==== Middlesex v Glamorgan (1 June) ====
1 June
Scorecard

| Middlesex; 124/9 (20 overs) | v | Glamorgan; 128/5 (15.3 overs) |
| Kane Williamson 25 (22); Mason Crane 4/28 (4 overs) | | Asa Tribe 40* (26); Tom Helm 3/29 (3.3 overs) |

Glamorgan won by 5 wickets
Merchant Taylors' School, Northwood
Umpires: Mark Newell and Rob Bailey

- Middlesex won the toss and elected to bat.
- Points: Glamorgan 2, Middlesex 0.

==== Glamorgan v Surrey (3 June) ====
3 June
Scorecard

| Surrey; 149/8 (20 overs) | v | Glamorgan; 142 (20 overs) |
| Jason Roy 69 (47); Dan Douthwaite 3/23 (4 overs) | | Kiran Carlson 31 (23); Sam Curran 3/18 (4 overs) |

Surrey won by 7 runs
Sophia Gardens, Cardiff
Umpires: David Millns and Surendiran Shanmugam

- Glamorgan won the toss and elected to field.
- Points: Surrey 4, Glamorgan 0.

==== Glamorgan v Essex (6 June) ====
6 June (D/N)
Scorecard

| Essex; 183/8 (20 overs) | v | Glamorgan; 185/4 (19 overs) |
| Michael Pepper 60 (30); Dan Douthwaite 3/34 (4 overs) | | Kiran Carlson 93 (57); Paul Walter 2/35 (4 overs) |

Glamorgan won by 6 wickets
Sophia Gardens, Cardiff
Umpires: Hassan Adnan and Naeem Ashraf

- Glamorgan won the toss and elected to field.
- Points: Glamorgan 4, Essex 0.

==== Sussex v Glamorgan (8 June) ====
8 June
Scorecard

| Sussex; 195/4 (20 overs) | v | Glamorgan; 117 (15.2 overs) |
| James Coles 75* (43); Jamie McIlroy 2/42 (4 overs) | | Asa Tribe 34 (21); Nathan McAndrew 5/19 (4 overs) |

Sussex won by 78 runs
County Cricket Ground, Hove
Umpires: Ian Blackwell and Mark Newell

- Sussex won the toss and elected to bat.
- Points: Sussex 4, Glamorgan 0.

==== Essex v Glamorgan (12 June) ====
12 June (D/N)
Scorecard

| Glamorgan; 220/6 (20 overs) | v | Essex; 180 (19.5 overs) |
| Will Smale 65 (40); Matt Critchley 2/34 (3 overs) | | Luc Benkenstein 62 (32); Mason Crane 3/24 (4 overs) |

Glamorgan won by 40 runs
County Cricket Ground, Chelmsford
Umpires: David Millns and Rob White
Player of the match: Will Smale (Glam)

- Essex won the toss and elected to field.
- Points: Glamorgan 4, Essex 0.

==== Glamorgan v Sussex (14 June) ====
14 June (D/N)
Scorecard

| Sussex; 199/7 (20 overs) | v | Glamorgan; 172 (18.5 overs) |
| Harrison Ward 55 (24); Mason Crane 3/43 (4 overs) | | Dan Douthwaite 40 (18); Nathan McAndrew 6/21 (3.5 overs) |

Sussex won by 27 runs
Sophia Gardens, Cardiff
Umpires: Ian Blackwell and Russell Warren
Player of the match: Nathan McAndrew (Sssx)

- Sussex won the toss and elected to bat.
- Points: Sussex 4, Glamorgan 0.

==== Gloucestershire v Glamorgan (15 June) ====
15 June
Scorecard

| Glamorgan; 189/6 (20 overs) | v | Gloucestershire; 149/9 (20 overs) |
| Asa Tribe 63* (28); Ajeet Singh Dale 3/17 (4 overs) | | Cameron Bancroft 52 (47); Mason Crane 4/20 (4 overs) |

Glamorgan won by 40 runs
County Ground, Bristol
Umpires: Chris Watts and Paul Baldwin

- Glamorgan won the toss and elected to bat.
- Points: Glamorgan 4, Gloucestershire 0.

==== Glamorgan v Somerset (20 June) ====
20 June (D/N)
Scorecard

| Glamorgan; 130/9 (20 overs) | v | Somerset; 131/4 (16.4 overs) |
| Asa Tribe 38 (24); Riley Meredith 4/21 (4 overs) | | Tom Kohler-Cadmore 38 (29); Dan Douthwaite 3/33 (4 overs) |

Somerset won by 6 wickets
Sophia Gardens, Cardiff
Umpires: Paul Baldwin and Surendiran Shanmugam

- Somerset won the toss and elected to field.
- Points: Somerset 4, Glamorgan 0.

==== Somerset v Glamorgan (4 July) ====
4 July (D/N)
Scorecard

| Glamorgan; 176/7 (20 overs) | v | Somerset; 174/9 (20 overs) |
| Dan Douthwaite 56 (32); Matt Henry 56 (32) | | Will Smeed 72 (49); Ned Leonard 5/25 (4 overs) |

Glamorgan won by 2 runs
County Ground, Taunton
Umpires: Ben Peverall and Mike Burns

- Somerset won the toss and elected to field.
- Points: Glamorgan 4, Somerset 0.

==== Glamorgan v Kent (6 July) ====
6 July
Scorecard

| Kent; 118/9 (20 overs) | v | Glamorgan; 122/4 (11.4 overs) |
| Jack Leaning 45* (40); Andy Gorvin 4/17 (4 overs) | | Kiran Carlson 34 (19); Fred Klaassen 2/31 (4 overs) |

Glamorgan won by 6 wickets
Sophia Gardens, Cardiff
Umpires: Anthony Harris and Rob White

- Glamorgan won the toss and elected to field.
- Points: Glamorgan 4, Kent 0.

==== Hampshire v Glamorgan (10 July) ====
10 July
Scorecard

| Hampshire; 208/4 (20 overs) | v | Glamorgan; 113 (18.5 overs) |
| Toby Albert 98* (57); Ben Kellaway 1/14 (1 over) | | Asa Tribe 20 (13); Sonny Baker 4/20 (4 overs) |

Hampshire won by 95 runs
Rose Bowl, Southampton
Umpires: James Tredwell and Mark Newell

- Hampshire won the toss and elected to bat.
- Points: Hampshire 4, Glamorgan 0.

==== Surrey v Glamorgan (11 July) ====
11 July (D/N)
Scorecard

| Glamorgan; 222/6 (20 overs) | v | Surrey; 224/4 (19.1 overs) |
| Colin Ingram 69 (33); Sam Curran 2/31 (4 overs) | | Dan Lawrence 120* (54); Ned Leonard 2/38 (4 overs) |

Surrey won by 6 wickets
The Oval, London
Umpires: James Tredwell and Martin Saggers

- Glamorgan won the toss and elected to bat.
- Points: Surrey 4, Glamorgan 0.

==== Glamorgan v Gloucestershire (13 July) ====
13 July
Scorecard

| Gloucestershire; 175/6 (20 overs) | v | Glamorgan; 135 (18.1 overs) |
| Ben Charlesworth 55 (44); Ben Kellaway 2/12 (2 overs) | | Will Smale 43 (27); Marchant de Lange 4/20 (4 overs) |

Gloucestershire won by 40 runs
Sophia Gardens, Cardiff
Umpires: Ben Peverall and Mike Burns

- Gloucestershire won the toss and elected to bat.
- Points: Gloucestershire 4, Glamorgan 0.

==== Glamorgan v Middlesex (18 July) ====
18 July (D/N)
Scorecard

| Glamorgan; 184/9 (20 overs) | v | Middlesex; 132 (18.5 overs) |
| Kiran Carlson 49 (19); Noah Cornwell 3/34 (4 overs) | | Kane Williamson 63 (42); Dan Douthwaite 4/22 (3.5 overs) |

Glamorgan won by 52 runs
Sophia Gardens, Cardiff
Umpires: Jack Shantry and Mike Burns

- Glamorgan won the toss and elected to bat.
- Points: Glamorgan 4, Middlesex 0.
- James Feldman (Middx) made his T20 debut.

=== Standings ===
| Pos | Team | Pld | W | L | T | NR | Pts | NRR |
|---|---|---|---|---|---|---|---|---|
| 1 | Surrey | 14 | 11 | 3 | 0 | 0 | 44 | 1.249 |
| 2 | Somerset | 14 | 11 | 3 | 0 | 0 | 44 | 0.788 |
| 3 | Hampshire Hawks | 14 | 7 | 6 | 1 | 0 | 30 | 0.961 |
| 4 | Kent Spitfires | 14 | 7 | 6 | 0 | 1 | 30 | −0.266 |
| 5 | Glamorgan | 14 | 7 | 7 | 0 | 0 | 28 | −0.090 |
| 6 | Sussex Sharks | 14 | 6 | 7 | 0 | 1 | 26 | 0.121 |
| 7 | Gloucestershire | 14 | 5 | 9 | 0 | 0 | 20 | −0.635 |
| 8 | Middlesex | 14 | 3 | 9 | 1 | 1 | 16 | −0.799 |
| 9 | Essex Eagles | 14 | 3 | 10 | 0 | 1 | 14 | −1.447 |

Source: ESPNcricinfo, BBC Sport

Advance to the quarter-finals

== Statistics ==
=== Batting ===
First-class
| Player | Matches | Innings | NO | Runs | HS | Ave | SR | 100 | 50 | 0 | 4s | 6s |
|---|---|---|---|---|---|---|---|---|---|---|---|---|
| Colin Ingram | 12 | 21 | 2 | 1,076 | 133* | 56.63 | 54.73 | 3 | 7 | 0 | 117 | 7 |
| Kiran Carlson | 14 | 23 | 1 | 1,020 | 113 | 46.36 | 58.62 | 3 | 5 | 1 | 110 | 9 |
| Sam Northeast | 13 | 22 | 1 | 883 | 139 | 42.04 | 50.77 | 3 | 3 | 1 | 102 | 3 |
| Ben Kellaway | 11 | 19 | 4 | 813 | 181* | 54.20 | 63.21 | 2 | 4 | 2 | 89 | 6 |
| Chris Cooke | 14 | 21 | 4 | 737 | 84 | 43.35 | 49.76 | 0 | 6 | 1 | 82 | 5 |
| Asa Tribe | 11 | 19 | 3 | 731 | 206 | 45.68 | 62.10 | 2 | 3 | 1 | 109 | 3 |
| Zain-ul-Hassan | 14 | 25 | 1 | 525 | 65 | 21.87 | 41.96 | 0 | 2 | 1 | 71 | 0 |
| Timm van der Gugten | 13 | 17 | 0 | 383 | 62 | 22.52 | 45.00 | 0 | 3 | 2 | 45 | 2 |
| Andy Gorvin | 7 | 9 | 1 | 222 | 50* | 27.75 | 39.78 | 0 | 1 | 0 | 27 | 0 |
| Eddie Byrom | 3 | 6 | 0 | 175 | 48 | 29.16 | 45.81 | 0 | 0 | 0 | 26 | 1 |
Source: ESPNcricinfo

List A
| Player | Matches | Innings | NO | Runs | HS | Ave | SR | 100 | 50 | 0 | 4s | 6s |
|---|---|---|---|---|---|---|---|---|---|---|---|---|
| Asa Tribe | 7 | 7 | 2 | 401 | 131* | 80.20 | 95.47 | 2 | 1 | 0 | 49 | 3 |
| Kiran Carlson | 7 | 7 | 0 | 294 | 135 | 42.00 | 133.03 | 1 | 1 | 0 | 20 | 18 |
| Eddie Byrom | 7 | 7 | 0 | 259 | 94 | 37.00 | 89.61 | 0 | 2 | 0 | 39 | 2 |
| Will Smale | 7 | 7 | 2 | 242 | 105* | 48.40 | 91.66 | 1 | 1 | 0 | 23 | 6 |
| Dan Douthwaite | 6 | 5 | 0 | 130 | 43 | 26.00 | 116.07 | 0 | 0 | 0 | 5 | 10 |
| Alex Horton | 3 | 3 | 0 | 83 | 35 | 27.66 | 127.69 | 0 | 0 | 0 | 10 | 2 |
| Zain-ul-Hassan | 6 | 5 | 0 | 81 | 33 | 16.20 | 69.82 | 0 | 0 | 1 | 7 | 1 |
| Sam Northeast | 2 | 2 | 0 | 76 | 52 | 38.00 | 82.60 | 0 | 1 | 0 | 9 | 2 |
| Henry Hurle | 4 | 4 | 0 | 72 | 56 | 18.00 | 64.28 | 0 | 1 | 0 | 8 | 3 |
| Billy Root | 5 | 4 | 0 | 61 | 56 | 15.25 | 70.11 | 0 | 1 | 0 | 4 | 0 |
Source: ESPNcricinfo

Twenty20
| Player | Matches | Innings | NO | Runs | HS | Ave | SR | 100 | 50 | 0 | 4s | 6s |
|---|---|---|---|---|---|---|---|---|---|---|---|---|
| Colin Ingram | 14 | 14 | 0 | 338 | 69 | 24.14 | 153.63 | 0 | 2 | 1 | 28 | 19 |
| Kiran Carlson | 14 | 14 | 0 | 337 | 93 | 24.07 | 142.79 | 0 | 1 | 0 | 26 | 16 |
| Will Smale | 14 | 14 | 0 | 329 | 65 | 23.50 | 137.08 | 0 | 1 | 1 | 37 | 13 |
| Asa Tribe | 14 | 14 | 5 | 312 | 63* | 34.66 | 150.72 | 0 | 2 | 0 | 20 | 18 |
| Ben Kellaway | 14 | 14 | 1 | 262 | 53 | 20.15 | 150.57 | 0 | 1 | 2 | 40 | 3 |
| Dan Douthwaite | 14 | 12 | 2 | 226 | 56 | 22.60 | 151.67 | 0 | 1 | 0 | 10 | 18 |
| Chris Cooke | 8 | 8 | 1 | 89 | 21 | 12.71 | 100.00 | 0 | 0 | 0 | 4 | 2 |
| Imad Wasim | 9 | 8 | 4 | 62 | 17 | 15.50 | 100.00 | 0 | 0 | 0 | 5 | 0 |
| Alex Horton | 6 | 6 | 0 | 46 | 20 | 7.66 | 109.52 | 0 | 0 | 0 | 7 | 0 |
| Timm van der Gugten | 10 | 7 | 1 | 44 | 21* | 7.33 | 115.78 | 0 | 0 | 2 | 1 | 3 |
Source: ESPNcricinfo

=== Bowling ===
First-class
| Player | Matches | Innings | Overs | Maidens | Runs | Wickets | BBI | BBM | Ave | Econ | SR | 5w | 10w |
|---|---|---|---|---|---|---|---|---|---|---|---|---|---|
| Timm van der Gugten | 13 | 21 | 332.2 | 83 | 924 | 34 | 5/85 | 6/56 | 27.17 | 2.78 | 1 | 1 | 0 |
| Ben Kellaway | 11 | 18 | 248.0 | 44 | 803 | 25 | 6/111 | 7/182 | 32.12 | 3.23 | 1 | 2 | 0 |
| Asitha Fernando | 10 | 16 | 233.4 | 35 | 825 | 24 | 4/71 | 6/70 | 34.37 | 3.53 | 1 | 0 | 0 |
| Mason Crane | 5 | 7 | 131.3 | 11 | 615 | 23 | 6/19 | 9/126 | 26.73 | 4.67 | 1 | 2 | 0 |
| James Harris | 10 | 17 | 251.0 | 40 | 967 | 22 | 3/35 | 4/88 | 43.95 | 3.85 | 0 | 0 | 0 |
| Andy Gorvin | 7 | 11 | 142.0 | 35 | 443 | 20 | 5/85 | 5/71 | 22.15 | 3.11 | 2 | 1 | 0 |
| Zain-ul-Hassan | 14 | 20 | 203.1 | 43 | 606 | 15 | 2/18 | 2/21 | 40.40 | 2.98 | 0 | 0 | 0 |
| Ned Leonard | 7 | 10 | 140.4 | 15 | 608 | 14 | 3/66 | 4/126 | 43.42 | 4.32 | 0 | 0 | 0 |
| Matthew Kuhnemann | 1 | 2 | 30.3 | 9 | 75 | 7 | 6/53 | 7/75 | 10.71 | 2.45 | 0 | 1 | 0 |
| Kiran Carlson | 14 | 8 | 40.0 | 4 | 169 | 5 | 3/24 | 3/24 | 33.80 | 4.22 | 0 | 0 | 0 |
Source: ESPNcricinfo

List A
| Player | Matches | Innings | Overs | Maidens | Runs | Wickets | BBI | Ave | Econ | SR | 4w | 5w |
|---|---|---|---|---|---|---|---|---|---|---|---|---|
| Zain-ul-Hassan | 6 | 6 | 40.0 | 2 | 208 | 6 | 3/60 | 34.66 | 5.20 | 40.00 | 0 | 0 |
| Ned Leonard | 5 | 5 | 38.0 | 2 | 256 | 6 | 3/54 | 42.66 | 6.73 | 38.00 | 0 | 0 |
| James Harris | 3 | 3 | 29.0 | 3 | 153 | 5 | 2/45 | 30.60 | 5.27 | 34.80 | 0 | 0 |
| Romano Franco | 6 | 6 | 47.4 | 0 | 296 | 5 | 3/59 | 59.20 | 6.20 | 57.20 | 0 | 0 |
| Andy Gorvin | 6 | 6 | 45.0 | 1 | 313 | 5 | 2/31 | 62.60 | 6.95 | 54.00 | 0 | 0 |
| Tom Norton | 1 | 1 | 10.0 | 1 | 41 | 3 | 3/41 | 13.66 | 4.10 | 20.00 | 0 | 0 |
| Asa Tribe | 7 | 4 | 15.0 | 0 | 96 | 3 | 2/55 | 32.00 | 6.40 | 30.00 | 0 | 0 |
| Kiran Carlson | 7 | 7 | 29.3 | 0 | 216 | 2 | 1/22 | 108.00 | 7.32 | 88.50 | 0 | 0 |
| Dan Douthwaite | 6 | 6 | 44.3 | 0 | 322 | 2 | 2/40 | 161.00 | 7.23 | 133.50 | 0 | 0 |
Source: ESPNcricinfo

Twenty20
| Player | Matches | Innings | Overs | Maidens | Runs | Wickets | BBI | Ave | Econ | SR | 4w | 5w |
|---|---|---|---|---|---|---|---|---|---|---|---|---|
| Ned Leonard | 10 | 10 | 36.0 | 0 | 278 | 20 | 5/25 | 13.90 | 7.72 | 10.80 | 1 | 1 |
| Dan Douthwaite | 14 | 14 | 52.5 | 0 | 478 | 20 | 4/22 | 23.90 | 9.04 | 15.85 | 1 | 0 |
| Mason Crane | 11 | 11 | 41.0 | 0 | 337 | 17 | 4/20 | 19.82 | 8.21 | 14.47 | 2 | 0 |
| Ben Kellaway | 14 | 11 | 19.4 | 0 | 171 | 10 | 2/12 | 17.10 | 8.69 | 11.80 | 0 | 0 |
| Imad Wasim | 9 | 9 | 36.00 | 0 | 256 | 9 | 3/23 | 28.44 | 7.11 | 24.00 | 0 | 0 |
| Andy Gorvin | 9 | 9 | 28.0 | 0 | 250 | 8 | 4/17 | 31.25 | 8.92 | 21.00 | 1 | 0 |
| Timm van der Gugten | 10 | 10 | 35.0 | 0 | 287 | 6 | 1/14 | 47.83 | 8.20 | 35.00 | 0 | 0 |
| Jamie McIlroy | 5 | 5 | 19.0 | 0 | 200 | 3 | 2/42 | 66.66 | 10.52 | 38.00 | 0 | 0 |
Source: ESPNcricinfo
