= 2025 T20 Blast =

English T20 Cricket tournament in 2025

2025 Vitality Blast
- Dates: 29 May – 13 September 2025
- Administrator: England and Wales Cricket Board
- Cricket format: Twenty20
- Tournament format(s): Group stage and knockout
- Host(s): England; Wales
- Champions: Somerset (3rd title)
- Runners-up: Hampshire Hawks
- Participants: 18
- Matches: 133
- Most runs: Toby Albert (633) (Hampshire Hawks)
- Most wickets: Riley Meredith (28) (Somerset)
- Official website: Vitality Blast

The 2025 T20 Blast (also known as 2025 Vitality Blast for sponsoring reasons) was the 23rd edition of the T20 Blast (currently known as the Vitality Blast), a professional Twenty20 cricket league played in England and Wales. The tournament ran from 29 May to 13 September 2025. The domestic T20 competition was run by the England and Wales Cricket Board (ECB) and was branded as the Vitality Blast due to the tournament's sponsorship.

Gloucestershire were the defending champions, having won their maiden title during the previous season.

On Finals Day, Somerset beat Lancashire Lightning by 23 runs in the first semi-final. In the second semi-final, Hampshire Hawks beat the Northants Steelbacks by 6 wickets. In the final, Somerset beat Hampshire Hawks by 6 wickets to win their third title.

== Format ==
The playing format was the same as the previous season, where groups remained the same with the familiar North and South split, while each county played 14 group-stage matches, seven at home and seven away.

== Teams ==
The teams are divided into the following groups:

- North Group: Birmingham Bears, Derbyshire Falcons, Durham, Lancashire Lightning, Leicestershire Foxes, Northants Steelbacks, Notts Outlaws, Worcestershire Rapids, Yorkshire
- South Group: Essex, Glamorgan, Gloucestershire, Hampshire Hawks, Kent Spitfires, Middlesex, Somerset, Surrey, Sussex Sharks

== Standings ==
=== North Group ===
Pos	Team	Pld	W	L	NR	Pts	NRR	Qualification
1	Lancashire Lightning	14	9	5	0	36	0.386	Advance to the Quarter-finals
2	Durham	14	8	5	1	34	0.676	Advance to the Quarter-finals
3	Birmingham Bears	14	8	6	0	32	0.671	Advance to the Quarter-finals
4	Northants Steelbacks	14	8	6	0	32	0.068	Advance to the Quarter-finals
5	Worcestershire Rapids	14	7	7	0	28	0.219	
6	Notts Outlaws	14	7	7	0	28	−0.492	
7	Leicestershire Foxes	14	6	7	1	26	−0.205	
8	Yorkshire	14	5	9	0	20	−0.390	
9	Derbyshire Falcons	14	4	10	0	16	−0.944	

Source: BBC SportESPNcricinfo

=== South Group ===
Pos	Team	Pld	W	L	T	NR	Pts	NRR	Qualification
1	Surrey	14	11	3	0	0	44	1.249	Advance to the Quarter-finals
2	Somerset (C)	14	11	3	0	0	44	0.788	Advance to the Quarter-finals
3	Hampshire Hawks	14	7	6	1	0	30	0.961	Advance to the Quarter-finals
4	Kent Spitfires	14	7	6	0	1	30	−0.266	Advance to the Quarter-finals
5	Glamorgan	14	7	7	0	0	28	−0.090	
6	Sussex Sharks	14	6	7	0	1	26	0.121	
7	Gloucestershire	14	5	9	0	0	20	−0.635	
8	Middlesex	14	3	9	1	1	16	−0.799	
9	Essex	14	3	10	0	1	14	−1.447	

Source: BBC SportESPNcricinfo
(C) Champions

== Fixtures ==
In November 2024, the ECB announced the fixtures for the tournament.

=== May ===
29 May 2025
18:30 (D/N)
Scorecard

Lancashire Lightning; 176/8 (20 overs)	v	Worcestershire Rapids; 169/7 (20 overs)
Keaton Jennings 66 (38); Fateh Singh 2/23 (4 overs)		Kashif Ali 39 (21); Luke Wood 2/39 (4 overs)

Lancashire Lightning won by 7 runs
Old Trafford, Manchester
Umpires: Richard Illingworth and Steve O'Shaughnessy

- Lancashire Lightning won the toss and elected to bat.
- Fateh Singh and Tom Hinley (Worcestershire Rapids) both made their T20 debuts.

29 May 2025
18:15 (D/N)
Scorecard

Sussex Sharks; 202/4 (20 overs)	v	Middlesex; 186/7 (20 overs)
James Coles 77* (44); Zafar Gohar 1/25 (3 overs)		Ben Geddes 51 (37); Ollie Robinson 3/27 (4 overs)

Sussex Sharks won by 16 runs
Lord's, London
Umpires: Nigel Llong and Rob White

- Middlesex won the toss and elected to field.

30 May 2025
19:00 (N)
Scorecard

Kent Spitfires; 208/3 (20 overs)	v	Gloucestershire; 204/7 (20 overs)
Daniel Bell-Drummond 60 (38); Tom Smith 2/39 (4 overs)		Oliver Price 51 (26); Tom Rogers 2/22 (4 overs)

Kent Spitfires won by 4 runs
County Ground, Bristol
Umpires: Ben Debenham and Russell Warren

- Gloucestershire won the toss and elected to field.
- Aman Rao (Gloucestershire) made his T20 debut.

30 May 2025
19:00 (N)
Scorecard

Hampshire Hawks; 230/7 (20 overs)	v	Essex Eagles; 124 (16.2 overs)
Dewald Brevis 68 (38); Mohammad Amir 2/46 (4 overs)		Michael Pepper 51 (38); Liam Dawson 4/26 (4 overs)

Hampshire Hawks won by 106 runs
Rose Bowl, Southampton
Umpires: Ian Blackwell and James Tredwell

- Essex Eagles won the toss and elected to field.

30 May 2025
18:30 (D/N)
Scorecard

Derbyshire Falcons; 170/6 (20 overs)	v	Leicestershire Foxes; 171/5 (18.4 overs)
Martin Andersson 70* (46); Logan van Beek 3/37 (4 overs)		Sol Budinger 51 (17); Allah Mohammad Ghazanfar 2/29 (4 overs)

Leicestershire Foxes won by 5 wickets
Grace Road, Leicester
Umpires: Rob Bailey and Paul Baldwin

- Leicestershire Foxes won the toss and elected to field.
- Nick Potts (Derbyshire Falcons) made his T20 debut.

30 May 2025
18:30 (D/N)
Scorecard

Birmingham Bears; 226/5 (20 overs)	v	Notts Outlaws; 229/3 (19.1 overs)
Sam Hain 92* (49); Daniel Sams 2/39 (4 overs)		Jack Haynes 89* (41); Danny Briggs 2/42 (4 overs)

Notts Outlaws won by 7 wickets
Trent Bridge, Nottingham
Umpires: Hassan Adnan and Chris Watts

- Notts Outlaws won the toss and elected to field.
- Kai Smith and Adam Sylvester (Birmingham Bears) both made their T20 debuts.

30 May 2025
18:30 (D/N)
Scorecard

Surrey; 146/9 (20 overs)	v	Somerset; 147/5 (17.5 overs)
Jason Roy 92 (54); Matt Henry 3/21 (4 overs)		Will Smeed 35 (29); Yousef Majid 2/26 (4 overs)

Somerset won by 5 wickets
County Ground, Taunton
Umpires: Mike Burns and Anthony Harris

- Somerset won the toss and elected to field.
- Thomas Rew (Somerset) and Yousef Majid (Surrey) both made their T20 debuts.

30 May 2025
18:30 (D/N)
Scorecard

Northants Steelbacks; 237/4 (20 overs)	v	Yorkshire; 224/9 (20 overs)
Justin Broad 67 (32); Dom Bess 2/29 (4 overs)		James Wharton 58 (29); David Willey 3/42 (4 overs)

Northants Steelbacks won by 13 runs
Headingley, Leeds
Umpires: Richard Kettleborough and Neil Pratt

- Yorkshire won the toss and elected to field.

31 May 2025
16:00
Scorecard

Birmingham Bears; 143 (20 overs)	v	Durham; 147/7 (17.1 overs)
Sam Hain 45 (28); James Neesham 3/34 (4 overs)		Ollie Robinson 45 (36); Danny Briggs 2/23 (3 overs)

Durham won by 3 wickets
Edgbaston, Birmingham
Umpires: Russell Warren and Rob White
Player of the match: Callum Parkinson (Durham)

- Durham won the toss and elected to field.

31 May 2025
16:00
Scorecard

Lancashire Lightning; 216/3 (20 overs)	v	Notts Outlaws; 169 (19.1 overs)
Keaton Jennings 95 (49); Liam Patterson-White 1/21 (2 overs)		Moises Henriques 60 (32); Charlie Barnard 3/23 (4 overs)

Lancashire Lightning won by 47 runs
Old Trafford, Manchester
Umpires: Michael Gough and Steve O'Shaughnessy

- Lancashire Lightning won the toss and elected to bat.
- Charlie Barnard (Lancashire Lightning) made his T20 debut.

=== June ===
1 June 2025
17:00 (D/N)
Scorecard

Durham; 150/6 (20 overs)	v	Lancashire Lightning; 151/6 (20 overs)
James Neesham 40* (25); James Anderson 3/17 (4 overs)		Michael Jones 55 (39); James Neesham 2/31 (4 overs)

Lancashire Lightning won by 4 wickets
Riverside Ground, Chester-le-Street
Umpires: Richard Kettleborough and Neil Pratt

- Lancashire Lightning won the toss and elected to field.

1 June 2025
14:30
Scorecard

Worcestershire Rapids; 201/5 (20 overs)	v	Yorkshire; 135/8 (19.3 overs)
Brett D'Oliveira 79 (48); Dom Bess 2/25 (3 overs)		Dom Bess 41* (37); Adam Finch 2/19 (4 overs)

Worcestershire Rapids won by 60 runs (DLS method)
New Road, Worcester
Umpires: Surendiran Shanmugam and Russell Warren

- Yorkshire won the toss and elected field.
- Yorkshire were set a revised target of 196 runs from 19.3 overs.

1 June 2025
16:00
Scorecard

Essex Eagles; 148 (19.1 overs)	v	Somerset; 149/2 (15.5 overs)
Matt Critchley 54 (31); Ben Green 3/30 (3 overs)		Will Smeed 81* (54); Luc Benkenstein 1/18 (2 overs)

Somerset won by 8 wickets
County Ground, Chelmsford
Umpires: Ben Debenham and Nigel Llong

- Essex won the toss and elected to bat.

1 June 2025
16:00
Scorecard

Middlesex; 124/9 (20 overs)	v	Glamorgan; 128/5 (15.3 overs)
Kane Williamson 25 (22); Mason Crane 4/28 (4 overs)		Asa Tribe 40* (26); Tom Helm 3/29 (3.3 overs)

Glamorgan won by 5 wickets
Merchant Taylors' Ground, Northwood
Umpires: Rob Bailey and Mark Newell

- Middlesex won the toss and elected to bat.

1 June 2025
15:00
Scorecard

Leicestershire Foxes; 122 (20 overs)	v	Northants Steelbacks; 123/5 (19.2 overs)
Logan van Beek 42 (42); Ben Sanderson 4/15 (4 overs)		Ravi Bopara 46* (40); Roman Walker 2/20 (3.2 overs)

Northants Steelbacks won by 5 wickets
County Ground, Northampton
Umpires: Hassan Adnan and Simon Widdup

- Northants Steelbacks won the toss and elected to field.

1 June 2025
16:00
Scorecard

Sussex Sharks; 173 (20 overs)	v	Gloucestershire; 93 (13.3 overs)
Tom Alsop 58 (35); David Payne 3/24 (4 overs)		James Bracey 24* (15); Tymal Mills 3/13 (2.3 overs)

Sussex Sharks won by 80 runs
County Ground, Hove
Umpires: Mike Burns and Ben Peverall

- Gloucestershire won the toss and elected to field.

3 June 2025
18:30 (D/N)
Scorecard

Surrey; 149/8 (20 overs)	v	Glamorgan; 142 (20 overs)
Jason Roy 69 (47); Dan Douthwaite 3/23 (4 overs)		Kiran Carlson 31 (23); Sam Curran 3/18 (4 overs)

Surrey won by 7 runs
Sophia Gardens, Cardiff
Umpires: David Millns and Surendiran Shanmugam

- Glamorgan won the toss and elected to field.

4 June 2025
19:00 (N)
Scorecard

Derbyshire Falcons; 194/6 (20 overs)	v	Northants Steelbacks; 188/4 (20 overs)
Ravi Bopara 84* (46); Allah Mohammad Ghazanfar 2/30 (4 overs)		Caleb Jewell 71 (44); David Willey 2/19 (4 overs)

Northants Steelbacks won by 6 runs
County Ground, Derby
Umpires: Hassan Adnan and Naeem Ashraf

- Derbyshire Falcons won the toss and elected to field.

4 June 2025
18:30 (D/N)
Scorecard

Lancashire Lightning; 145/7 (20 overs)	v	Leicestershire Foxes; 149/5 (20 overs)
Keaton Jennings 39 (19); Rehan Ahmed 3/16 (4 overs)		Louis Kimber 40 (22); Chris Green 2/30 (4 overs)

Leicestershire Foxes won by 5 wickets
Old Trafford, Manchester
Umpires: Richard Kettleborough and Simon Widdup

- Lancashire Lightning won the toss and elected to bat.

5 June 2025
18:15 (D/N)
Scorecard

Kent Spitfires; 172/9 (20 overs)	v	Middlesex
Zak Crawley 57 (34); Luke Hollman 3/42 (4 overs)

No result
Lord's, London
Umpires: Ben Debenham and Nigel Llong

- Middlesex won the toss and elected to field.
- Rain prevented any further play.

5 June 2025
18:30 (D/N)
Scorecard

Surrey; 147/7 (20 overs)	v	Hampshire Hawks; 63/0 (8.2 overs)
Jason Roy 37 (33); John Turner 2/42 (4 overs)		James Vince 33* (28)

Hampshire Hawks won by 15 runs (DLS method)
The Oval, London
Umpires: James Tredwell and Mark Newell

- Hampshire Hawks won the toss and elected to field.

6 June 2025
19:00 (N)
Scorecard

Yorkshire; 164/7 (20 overs)	v	Birmingham Bears; 168/4 (19 overs)
Dawid Malan 69* (48); Moeen Ali 2/30 (4 overs)		Alex Davies 65 (45); Matt Milnes 3/23 (4 overs)

Birmingham Bears won by 6 wickets
Edgbaston, Birmingham
Umpires: James Middlebrook and Tom Lungley

- Birmingham Bears won the toss and elected to field.

6 June 2025
19:00 (N)
Scorecard

Derbyshire Falcons; 162/9 (20 overs)	v	Notts Outlaws; 115/3 (13.4 overs)
Aneurin Donald 50 (22); Dillon Pennington 3/40 (4 overs)		Jack Haynes 43 (29); Martin Andersson 1/25 (3 overs)

Notts Outlaws won by 5 runs (DLS method)
County Ground, Derby
Umpires: Michael Gough and Neil Pratt

- Notts Outlaws won the toss and elected to field.
- Notts Outlaws were set a revised target of 120 runs off 15 overs.

6 June 2025
18:30 (D/N)
Scorecard

Essex Eagles; 183/8 (20 overs)	v	Glamorgan; 185/4 (19 overs)
Michael Pepper 60 (30); Dan Douthwaite 3/34 (4 overs)		Kiran Carlson 93 (57); Paul Walter 2/35 (4 overs)

Glamorgan won by 6 wickets
Sophia Gardens, Cardiff
Umpires: Hassan Adnan and Naeem Ashraf

- Glamorgan won the toss and elected to field.

6 June 2025
19:00 (N)
Scorecard

Gloucestershire; 119 (19.5 overs)	v	Hampshire Hawks; 121/3 (15 overs)
Oliver Price 42 (39); John Turner 3/28 (4 overs)		Toby Albert 73* (44); D'Arcy Short 1/22 (3 overs)

Hampshire Hawks won by 7 wickets
Rose Bowl, Southampton
Umpires: Anthony Harris and Paul Baldwin

- Gloucestershire won the toss and elected to bat.

6 June 2025
18:30 (D/N)
Scorecard

Surrey; 193/7 (20 overs)	v	Kent Spitfires; 151/9 (20 overs)
Laurie Evans 62 (26); Grant Stewart 3/27 (4 overs)		Zak Crawley 46 (31); Mitchell Santner 3/28 (4 overs)

Surrey won by 42 runs
St Lawrence Ground, Canterbury
Umpires: James Tredwell and Neil Bainton

- Kent Spitfires won the toss and elected to field.

6 June 2025
18:30 (D/N)
Scorecard

Leicestershire Foxes; 193/8 (20 overs)	v	Durham; 187/7 (20 overs)
Louis Kimber 51 (27); Ben Raine 5/23 (4 overs)		Kasey Aldridge 44* (27); Tom Scriven 2/25 (4 overs)

Leicestershire Foxes won by 6 runs
Grace Road, Leicester
Umpires: Rob Bailey and Steve O'Shaughnessy

- Durham won the toss and elected to field.

6 June 2025
19:00 (N)
Scorecard

Sussex Sharks; 166/8 (20 overs)	v	Somerset; 169/3 (18 overs)
John Simpson 58 (42); Matt Henry 3/29 (4 overs)		Tom Kohler-Cadmore 64 (43); Ollie Robinson 1/35 (3 overs)

Somerset won by 7 wickets
County Ground, Hove
Umpires: Mark Newell and Nigel Llong

- Somerset won the toss and elected to field.

6 June 2025
15:30
Scorecard

Northants Steelbacks; 190/5 (20 overs)	v	Worcestershire Rapids; 159 (19 overs)
Ricardo Vasconcelos 59 (39); Jacob Duffy 2/27 (4 overs)		Gareth Roderick 29 (22); Ben Sanderson 6/8 (4 overs)

Northants Steelbacks won by 31 runs
New Road, Worcester
Umpires: Ben Peverall and Paul Pollard

- Northants Steelbacks won the toss and elected to bat.
- Ben Sanderson (Northants Steelbacks) took his maiden five-wicket haul and also took his first hat-trick in T20s.

7 June 2025
19:00 (N)
Scorecard

Worcestershire Rapids; 206/5 (20 overs)	v	Notts Outlaws; 181/7 (20 overs)
Adam Hose 95 (51); Dillon Pennington 2/48 (4 overs)		Liam Patterson-White 39* (19); Tom Taylor 2/36 (4 overs)

Worcestershire Rapids won by 25 runs
Trent Bridge, Nottingham
Umpires: James Middlebrook and Steve O'Shaughnessy
Player of the match: Adam Hose (Worcestershire Rapids)

- Notts Outlaws won the toss and elected to field.

8 June 2025
16:00
Scorecard

Birmingham Bears; 199/6 (20 overs)	v	Derbyshire Falcons; 141 (17.1 overs)
Tom Latham 58 (42); Pat Brown 3/40 (4 overs)		Ross Whiteley 50 (37); Hasan Ali 6/23 (3.1 overs)

Birmingham Bears won by 58 runs
Edgbaston, Birmingham
Umpires: Paul Pollard and Rob White

- Derbyshire Falcons won the toss and elected to field.

8 June 2025
14:00
Scorecard

Essex Eagles; 156/9 (20 overs)	v	Middlesex; 159/4 (17.3 overs)
Simon Harmer 41 (28); Tom Helm 4/32 (4 overs)		Stephen Eskinazi 72 (47); Paul Walter 2/34 (3 overs)

Middlesex won by 6 wickets
County Ground, Chelmsford
Umpires: Hassan Adnan and Neil Bainton

- Middlesex won the toss and elected to field.

8 June 2025
14:30
Scorecard

Hampshire Hawks; 177/7 (20 overs)	v	Kent Spitfires; 182/2 (19 overs)
Joe Weatherley 63* (46); Tom Rogers 3/33 (4 overs)		Zak Crawley 75* (43); Chris Wood 2/32 (4 overs)

Kent won by 8 wickets
St Lawrence Ground, Canterbury
Umpires: Ben Debenham and Anthony Harris

- Hampshire Hawks won the toss and elected to bat.

8 June 2025
13:00
Scorecard

Northants Steelbacks; 180/6 (20 overs)	v	Lancashire Lightning; 156/9 (20 overs)
David Willey 37 (35); James Anderson 3/31 (4 overs)		Michael Jones 32 (31); George Scrimshaw 4/19 (4 overs)

Northants Steelbacks won by 24 runs
Old Trafford, Manchester
Umpires: Naeem Ashraf and Steve O'Shaughnessy

- Northants Steelbacks won the toss and elected to bat.

8 June 2025
16:00
Scorecard

Sussex Sharks; 195/4 (20 overs)	v	Glamorgan; 117 (15.2 overs)
James Coles 75* (43); Jamie McIlroy 2/42 (4 overs)		Asa Tribe 34 (21); Nathan McAndrew 5/19 (4 overs)

Sussex Sharks won by 78 runs
County Ground, Hove
Umpires: Ian Blackwell and Mark Newell

- Sussex Sharks won the toss and elected to bat.

8 June 2025
15:00
Scorecard

Yorkshire; 213/7 (20 overs)	v	Leicestershire Foxes; 107 (16.5 overs)
Dawid Malan 88 (48); Logan van Beek 3/47 (4 overs)		Logan van Beek 26 (19); Jafer Chohan 4/27 (4 overs)

Yorkshire won by 106 runs
Headingley, Leeds
Umpires: James Middlebrook and Neil Pratt

- Leicestershire Foxes won the toss and elected to field.

11 June 2025
18:30 (D/N)
Scorecard

Durham; 168/6 (20 overs)	v	Derbyshire Falcons; 152 (19.3 overs)
Ollie Robinson 70 (46); Allah Mohammad Ghazanfar 2/18 (4 overs)		Wayne Madsen 37 (31); Ben Raine 3/21 (3.3 overs)

Durham won by 16 runs
Riverside Ground, Chester-le-Street
Umpires: Michael Gough and Neil Pratt

- Derbyshire Falcons won the toss and elected to field.

11 June 2025
18:30 (D/N)
Scorecard

Northants Steelbacks; 186/6 (20 overs)	v	Birmingham Bears; 174/8 (20 overs)
Justin Broad 60 (35); Hasan Ali 3/42 (4 overs)		Dan Mousley 68 (42); Ben Sanderson 3/31 (4 overs)

Northants Steelbacks won by 10 runs
County Ground, Northampton
Umpires: James Middlebrook and Paul Pollard
Player of the match: George Scrimshaw (Northants Steelbacks)

- Birmingham Bears won the toss and elected to field.

11 June 2025
18:30 (D/N)
Scorecard

Yorkshire; 175/8 (20 overs)	v	Notts Outlaws; 166/9 (20 overs)
Dawid Malan 58 (28); Liam Patterson-White 2/24 (4 overs)		Joe Clarke 50 (29); Jack White 4/33 (4 overs)

Yorkshire won by 9 runs
Trent Bridge, Nottingham
Umpires: Naeem Ashraf and Steve O'Shaughnessy

- Yorkshire won the toss and elected to bat.

12 June 2025
18:30 (D/N)
Scorecard

Glamorgan; 220/6 (20 overs)	v	Essex Eagles; 180 (19.5 overs)
William Smale 65 (40); Matt Critchley 2/34 (3 overs)		Luc Benkenstein 62 (32); Mason Crane 3/24 (4 overs)

Glamorgan won by 40 runs
County Ground, Chelmsford
Umpires: David Millns and Rob White
Player of the match: William Smale (Glamorgan)

- Essex Eagles won the toss and elected to field.

12 June 2025
18:30 (D/N)
Scorecard

Middlesex; 229/5 (20 overs)	v	Somerset; 235/5 (19.2 overs)
Max Holden 87* (47); Riley Meredith 4/46 (4 overs)		Sean Dickson 76 (38); Noah Cornwell 2/36 (3.2 overs)

Somerset won by 5 wickets
County Ground, Taunton
Umpires: Anthony Harris and Mark Newell

- Somerset won the toss and elected to field.

12 June 2025
18:30 (D/N)
Scorecard

Kent Spitfires; 171/7 (20 overs)	v	Surrey; 173/6 (20 overs)
Joe Denly 40 (22); Chris Jordan 4/10 (4 overs)		Jason Roy 56 (30); Wes Agar 3/26 (4 overs)

Surrey won by 4 wickets
The Oval, London
Umpires: Hassan Adnan and Ben Debenham

- Surrey won the toss and elected to field.

13 June 2025
19:00 (N)
Scorecard

Gloucestershire; 135/7 (20 overs)	v	Somerset; 137/4 (17.4 overs)
Jack Taylor 43* (29); Lewis Goldsworthy 4/13 (4 overs)		Will Smeed 51* (45); D'Arcy Short 1/28 (4 overs)

Somerset won by 6 wickets
County Ground, Bristol
Umpires: Mike Burns and Paul Pollard
Player of the match: Lewis Goldsworthy (Somerset)

- Somerset won the toss and elected to field.

13 June 2025
19:00 (N)
Scorecard

Hampshire Hawks; 63/1 (6 overs)	v	Middlesex; 75/1 (6 overs)
Lhuan-dre Pretorius 44* (22); Zafar Gohar 1/14 (2 overs)		Max Holden 38 (18); Scott Currie 1/19 (2 overs)

Match tied (DLS method)
Rose Bowl, Southampton
Umpires: Mark Newell and Nigel Llong

- Middlesex won the toss and elected to field.
- The match was reduced to 6 overs per side due to rain.
- Middlesex were set a revised target of 76 runs from 6 overs due to rain.

13 June 2025
18:30 (D/N)
Scorecard

Durham; 157/8 (20 overs)	v	Northants Steelbacks; 142/8 (20 overs)
James Neesham 50* (34); Justin Broad 2/22 (4 overs)		Matthew Breetzke 41 (36); James Neesham 3/29 (4 overs)

Durham won by 15 runs
County Ground, Northampton
Umpires: Neil Bainton and Ben Debenham

- Durham won the toss and elected to bat.

13 June 2025
18:30 (D/N)
Scorecard

Derbyshire Falcons; 199/5 (20 overs)	v	Notts Outlaws; 153/9 (20 overs)
Aneurin Donald 73 (34); Calvin Harrison 3/32 (4 overs)		Joe Clarke 59 (36); Samit Patel 3/14 (4 overs)

Derbyshire Falcons won by 46 runs
Trent Bridge, Nottingham
Umpires: Michael Gough and Rob White

- Notts Outlaws won the toss and elected to field.

13 June 2025
19:00 (N)
Scorecard

Essex Eagles; 177/4 (17 overs)	v	Sussex Sharks; 23/3 (3.1 overs)
Jordan Cox 82 (47); Henry Crocombe 2/28 (4 overs)		Daniel Hughes 10* (5); Shane Snater 3/8 (2 overs)

No result
County Ground, Hove
Umpires: Hassan Adnan and Martin Saggers

- Sussex Sharks won the toss and elected to field.
- The match was reduced to 17 overs per side due to rain.
- Noah Thain (Essex Eagles) made his T20 debut.

13 June 2025
17:30
Scorecard

Worcestershire Rapids; 143 (20 overs)	v	Lancashire Lightning; 146/3 (17.3 overs)
Gareth Roderick 35 (28); James Anderson 3/32 (4 overs)		Keaton Jennings 42 (37); Matthew Waite 1/23 (3 overs)

Lancashire Lightning won by 7 wickets
New Road, Worcester
Umpires: Naeem Ashraf and Russell Warren

- Worcestershire Rapids won the toss and elected to bat.

13 June 2025
18:30 (D/N)
Scorecard

Birmingham Bears; 205/8 (20 overs)	v	Yorkshire; 173/5 (20 overs)
Ed Barnard 67 (40); Will O'Rourke 3/31 (4 overs)		Dawid Malan 65 (34); Hasan Ali 2/32 (4 overs)

Birmingham Bears won by 32 runs
Headingley, Leeds
Umpires: Steve O'Shaughnessy and Tom Lungley

- Birmingham Bears won the toss and elected to bat.

14 June 2025
19:00 (N)
Scorecard

Birmingham Bears; 206/7 (20 overs)	v	Notts Outlaws; 212/4 (20 overs)
Tom Latham 69 (39); Liam Patterson-White 3/37 (3 overs)		Tom Moores 74* (33); Dan Mousley 2/44 (4 overs)

Notts Outlaws won by 6 wickets
Edgbaston, Birmingham
Umpires: James Middlebrook and Neil Pratt

- Notts Outlaws won the toss and elected to field.

14 June 2025
15:00
Scorecard

Leicestershire Foxes; 196/5 (20 overs)	v	Derbyshire Falcons; 197/3 (18.2 overs)
Sol Budinger 49 (24); Pat Brown 4/51 (4 overs)		Aneurin Donald 60 (25); Tom Scriven 3/29 (4 overs)

Derbyshire Falcons won by 7 wickets
Edgbaston, Birmingham
Umpires: Michael Gough and Sue Redfern

- Leicestershire Foxes won the toss and elected to bat.

14 June 2025
18:30 (D/N)
Scorecard

Sussex Sharks; 199/7 (20 overs)	v	Glamorgan; 172 (18.5 overs)
Harrison Ward 55 (24); Mason Crane 3/43 (4 overs)		Dan Douthwaite 40 (18); Nathan McAndrew 6/21 (3.5 overs)

Sussex Sharks won by 27 runs
Sophia Gardens, Cardiff
Umpires: Ian Blackwell and Russell Warren

- Sussex Sharks won the toss and elected to bat.

15 June 2025
16:00
Scorecard

Glamorgan; 189/6 (20 overs)	v	Gloucestershire; 149/9 (20 overs)
Asa Tribe 63* (28); Ajeet Singh Dale 3/17 (4 overs)		Cameron Bancroft 52 (47); Mason Crane 4/20 (4 overs)

Glamorgan won by 40 runs
County Ground, Bristol
Umpires: Paul Baldwin and Chris Watts

- Glamorgan won the toss and elected to bat.

15 June 2025
16:00
Scorecard

Worcestershire Rapids; 150/8 (20 overs)	v	Leicestershire Foxes; 153/4 (17.1 overs)
Gareth Roderick 49 (29); Ben Mike 3/14 (4 overs)		Sol Budinger 30 (22); Matthew Waite 1/12 (2.1 overs)

Leicestershire Foxes won by 6 wickets
Grace Road, Leicester
Umpires: Graham Lloyd and Neil Pratt

- Worcestershire Rapids won the toss and elected to bat.

15 June 2025
16:00
Scorecard

Kent Spitfires; 228/5 (20 overs)	v	Somerset; 224/6 (20 overs)
Daniel Bell-Drummond 100 (49); Riley Meredith 3/45 (4 overs)		Tom Banton 68 (33); Joey Evison 2/24 (4 overs)

Kent Spitfires won by 4 runs
County Ground, Taunton
Umpires: Mike Burns and Mark Newell

- Somerset won the toss and elected to field.

15 June 2025
14:30
Scorecard

Yorkshire; 128 (19 overs)	v	Durham; 131/4 (18 overs)
James Wharton 26 (23); Matthew Potts 5/17 (4 overs)		Alex Lees 62 (46); Jafer Chohan 1/14 (2 overs)

Durham won by 6 wickets
York Cricket Club, York
Umpires: Michael Gough and David Millns

- Durham won the toss and elected to field.
- Matthew Potts (Durham) took his maiden five-wicket haul in T20s.

17 June 2025
19:00 (N)
Scorecard

Surrey; 193/6 (20 overs)	v	Hampshire Hawks; 124 (17.5 overs)
Will Jacks 41 (24); Scott Currie 2/36 (4 overs)		Lhuan-dre Pretorius 28 (19); Nathan Smith 3/18 (2.5 overs)

Surrey won by 69 runs
Rose Bowl, Southampton
Umpires: Ian Blackwell and Martin Saggers
Player of the match: Dom Sibley (Surrey)

- Hampshire Hawks won the toss and elected to field.

18 June 2025
18:30 (D/N)
Scorecard

Kent Spitfires; 157/9 (20 overs)	v	Gloucestershire; 160/3 (18.2 overs)
Harry Finch 42 (34); Ajeet Singh Dale 3/24 (4 overs)		Jack Taylor 54* (36); Matt Parkinson 1/27 (4 overs)

Gloucestershire won by 7 wickets
St Lawrence Ground, Canterbury
Umpires: Nigel Llong and Mark Newell
Player of the match: Ajeet Singh Dale (Gloucestershire)

- Kent Spitfires won the toss and elected to field.

18 June 2025
18:30 (D/N)
Scorecard

Surrey; 210/6 (20 overs)	v	Sussex Sharks; 162 (19.5 overs)
Dom Sibley 45 (32); Nathan McAndrew 2/39 (4 overs)		Danny Lamb 49 (34); Mitchell Santner 3/26 (4 overs)

Surrey won by 48 runs
The Oval, London
Umpires: Ben Debenham and Paul Pollard

- Sussex Sharks won the toss and elected to field.

18 June 2025
17:30
Scorecard

Durham; 155/6 (20 overs)	v	Worcestershire Rapids; 156/4 (17.1 overs)
Will Rhodes 58* (33); Matthew Waite 2/20 (4 overs)		Ethan Brookes 51 (24); Ben Raine 2/35 (4 overs)

Worcestershire Rapids won by 6 wickets
New Road, Worcester
Umpires: Richard Illingworth and Sue Redfern

- Worcestershire Rapids won the toss and elected to field.
- Isaac Mohammed (Worcestershire Rapids) made his T20 debut.

19 June 2025
18:30 (D/N)
Scorecard

Notts Outlaws; 156 (19.3 overs)	v	Leicestershire Foxes; 160/6 (17.4 overs)
Lyndon James 30 (26); Logan van Beek 3/15 (3.3 overs)		Rehan Ahmed 52 (37); Matt Montgomery 2/7 (1.4 overs)

Leicestershire Foxes won by 4 wickets
Grace Road, Leicester
Umpires: Michael Gough and Tom Lungley
Player of the match: Rehan Ahmed (Leicestershire Foxes)

- Leicestershire Foxes won the toss and elected to field.

19 June 2025
18:15 (D/N)
Scorecard

Middlesex; 161 (19.5 overs)	v	Essex Eagles; 160/6 (20 overs)
Kane Williamson 53 (31); Mohammad Amir 3/19 (3.5 overs)		Paul Walter 30 (22); Tom Helm 2/31 (4 overs)

Middlesex won by 1 run
Lord's, London
Umpires: Chris Watts and Paul Pollard

- Essex Eagles won the toss and elected to field.
- Naavya Sharma (Middlesex) made his T20 debut.

19 June 2025
18:30 (D/N)
Scorecard

Somerset; 209/7 (20 overs)	v	Hampshire Hawks; 192/7 (20 overs)
Will Smeed 68 (37); Benny Howell 2/13 (3 overs)		James Vince 54 (30); Ben Green 3/40 (4 overs)

Somerset won by 17 runs
County Ground, Taunton
Umpires: Ian Blackwell and Paul Baldwin

- Hampshire Hawks won the toss and elected to field.

20 June 2025
19:00 (N)
Scorecard

Worcestershire Rapids; 134 (18.4 overs)	v	Birmingham Bears; 135/9 (19.3 overs)
Ben Dwarshuis 26 (19); Dan Mousley 4/19 (4 overs)		Alex Davies 42 (24); Ben Dwarshuis 3/32 (4 overs)

Birmingham Bears won by 1 wicket
Edgbaston, Birmingham
Umpires: Russell Warren and Steve O'Shaughnessy

- Birmingham Bears won the toss and elected to field.

20 June 2025
19:00 (N)
Scorecard

Lancashire Lightning; 243/7 (20 overs)	v	Derbyshire Falcons; 163 (17.2 overs)
Luke Wells 83 (44); Zak Chappell 2/44 (4 overs)		Caleb Jewell 65 (43); Chris Green 3/16 (4 overs)

Lancashire Lightning won by 80 runs
County Ground, Derby
Umpires: David Millns and Simon Widdup

- Derbyshire Falcons won the toss and elected to field.

20 June 2025
18:30 (D/N)
Scorecard

Durham; 193/4 (20 overs)	v	Yorkshire; 130 (17.3 overs)
Graham Clark 53 (35); William O'Rourke 3/37 (4 overs)		Adam Lyth 38 (32); Callum Parkinson 2/29 (4 overs)

Durham won by 63 runs
Riverside Ground, Chester-le-Street
Umpires: Graham Lloyd and Neil Pratt

- Yorkshire won the toss and elected to field.

20 June 2025
19:00 (N)
Scorecard

Kent Spitfires; 219/3 (20 overs)	v	Essex Eagles; 172 (19 overs)
Tawanda Muyeye 100 (59); Shane Snater 1/45 (4 overs)		Simon Harmer 55 (21); Matt Parkinson 5/23 (4 overs)

Kent Spitfires won by 47 runs
County Ground, Chelmsford
Umpires: Chris Watts and Rob White

- Essex Eagles won the toss and elected to field.

20 June 2025
18:30 (D/N)
Scorecard

Glamorgan; 130/9 (20 overs)	v	Somerset; 131/4 (16.4 overs)
Asa Tribe 38 (24); Riley Meredith 4/21 (4 overs)		Tom Kohler-Cadmore 38 (29); Dan Douthwaite 3/33 (4 overs)

Somerset won by 6 wickets
Sophia Gardens, Cardiff
Umpires: Paul Baldwin and Surendiran Shanmugam

- Somerset won the toss and elected to field.

20 June 2025
19:00 (N)
Scorecard

Hampshire Hawks; 124/9 (20 overs)	v	Gloucestershire; 130/8 (20 overs)
Joe Weatherley 18 (23); David Payne 3/30 (4 overs)		D'Arcy Short 49 (41); Chris Wood 2/26 (4 overs)

Gloucestershire won by 2 wickets
County Ground, Bristol
Umpires: Jack Shantry and Richard Illingworth

- Gloucestershire won the toss and elected to field.

20 June 2025
18:30 (D/N)
Scorecard

Notts Outlaws; 164/8 (20 overs)	v	Northants Steelbacks; 140 (19.2 overs)
Tom Moores 53 (27); Ben Sanderson 2/47 (4 overs)		Saif Zaib 37 (29); Matt Montgomery 3/22 (3.2 overs)

Notts Outlaws won by 24 runs
County Ground, Northampton
Umpires: James Tredwell and Rob Bailey

- Notts Outlaws won the toss and elected to bat.

20 June 2025
18:45 (N)
Scorecard

Surrey; 194/8 (20 overs)	v	Middlesex; 119 (18.4 overs)
Will Jacks 97 (56); Tom Helm 3/48 (4 overs)		Ryan Higgins 27 (26); Mitchell Santner 3/25 (4 overs)

Surrey won by 75 runs
The Oval, London
Umpires: Ben Debenham and James Middlebrook
Player of the match: Will Jacks (Surrey)

- Middlesex won the toss and elected to field.

=== July ===
4 July 2025
18:30 (D/N)
Scorecard

Durham; 231/5 (20 overs)	v	Notts Outlaws; 182 (15.4 overs)
Colin Ackermann 88 (33); Calvin Harrison 2/33 (4 overs)		Matt Montgomery 41 (18); Kasey Aldridge 5/29 (2.4 overs)

Durham won by 49 runs
Riverside Ground, Chester-le-Street
Umpires: Michael Gough and Steve O'Shaughnessy

- Notts Outlaws won the toss and elected to field.
- Kasey Aldridge (Durham) took his maiden five-wicket haul in T20s.

4 July 2025
19:00 (N)
Scorecard

Gloucestershire; 184/7 (20 overs)	v	Essex Eagles; 171 (19.3 overs)
Jack Taylor 50 (35); Mohammad Amir 3/33 (4 overs)		Paul Walter 39 (27); Josh Shaw 3/29 (4 overs)

Gloucestershire won by 13 runs
County Ground, Chelmsford
Umpires: Chris Watts and Rob White

- Essex Eagles won the toss and elected to field.

4 July 2025
18:30 (D/N)
Scorecard

Sussex Sharks; 195/9 (20 overs)	v	Kent Spitfires; 161 (19.4 overs)
Daniel Hughes 48 (28); Nathan Gilchrist 3/31 (4 overs)		Harry Finch 56 (26); Danny Lamb 5/15 (3.4 overs)

Sussex Sharks won by 34 runs
St Lawrence Ground, Canterbury
Umpires: Nigel Llong and Mark Newell

- Kent Spitfires won the toss and elected to field.
- Danny Lamb (Sussex Sharks) took his maiden five-wicket haul in T20s.

4 July 2025
18:30 (D/N)
Scorecard

Leicestershire Foxes; 154 (19.3 overs)	v	Birmingham Bears; 158/4 (18.2 overs)
Sol Budinger 51 (24); Hasan Ali 4/22 (4 overs)		Dan Mousley 64* (48); Louis Kimber 2/27 (3 overs)

Birmingham Bears won by 6 wickets
Grace Road, Leicester
Umpires: Hassan Adnan and Tom Lungley

- Birmingham Bears won the toss and elected to field.

4 July 2025
18:30 (D/N)
Scorecard

Northants Steelbacks; 177 (20 overs)	v	Lancashire Lightning; 181/5 (19.3 overs)
Saif Zaib 32 (19); Saqib Mahmood 4/49 (4 overs)		Phil Salt 80 (57); George Scrimshaw 2/26 (3 overs)

Lancashire Lightning won by 5 wickets
County Ground, Northampton
Umpires: Rob Bailey and Simon Widdup

- Northants Steelbacks won the toss and elected to bat.
- Saqib Mahmood (Lancashire Lightning) took his first hat-trick in T20s.

4 July 2025
18:30 (D/N)
Scorecard

Glamorgan; 176/7 (20 overs)	v	Somerset; 174/9 (20 overs)
Dan Douthwaite 56 (32); Matt Henry 2/15 (4 overs)		Will Smeed 72 (49); Ned Leonard 5/25 (4 overs)

Glamorgan won by 2 runs
County Ground, Taunton
Umpires: Mike Burns and Ben Peverall

- Somerset won the toss and elected to field.
- Ned Leonard (Glamorgan) took his maiden five-wicket haul in T20s.

4 July 2025
18:30 (D/N)
Scorecard

Yorkshire; 233/6 (20 overs)	v	Worcestershire Rapids; 192 (19.1 overs)
James Wharton 88 (47); Ben Allison 2/35 (3 overs)		Brett D'Oliveira 53 (36); Will O'Rourke 5/22 (4 overs)

Yorkshire won by 41 runs
Headingley, Leeds
Umpires: Peter Hartley and Graham Lloyd

- Worcestershire Rapids won the toss and elected to field.
- Will O'Rourke (Yorkshire) took his maiden five-wicket haul in T20s.

5 July 2025
15:00
Scorecard

Lancashire Lightning; 178/6 (20 overs)	v	Derbyshire Falcons; 136/6 (20 overs)
Phil Salt 44 (35); Zak Chappell 3/23 (4 overs)		Wayne Madsen 53 (40); Luke Wood 3/25 (4 overs)

Lancashire Lightning won by 42 runs
Old Trafford, Manchester
Umpires: Hasan Adnan and Jack Shantry

- Derbyshire Falcons won the toss and elected to field.

5 July 2025
19:00 (N)
Scorecard

Hampshire Hawks; 196/8 (20 overs)	v	Sussex Sharks; 134 (16.5 overs)
Chris Lynn 51 (27); Nathan McAndrew 3/32 (4 overs)		Nathan McAndrew 31* (18); Benny Howell 2/22 (3 overs)

Hampshire Hawks won by 62 runs
County Ground, Hove
Umpires: Ian Blackwell and Mark Newell
Player of the match: Benny Howell (Hampshire Hawks)

- Sussex Sharks won the toss and elected to field.

6 July 2025
14:30
Scorecard

Yorkshire; 200/6 (20 overs)	v	Derbyshire Falcons; 201/3 (17.2 overs)
Jordan Thompson 37* (11); Allah Mohammad Ghazanfar 2/21 (4 overs)		Aneurin Donald 85 (30); Will Sutherland 1/16 (3 overs)

Derbyshire Falcons won by 7 wickets
Queen's Park, Chesterfield
Umpires: Steve O'Shaughnessy and Neil Pratt

- Derbyshire Falcons won the toss and elected to field.

6 July 2025
14:30
Scorecard

Durham; 182/7 (20 overs)	v	Birmingham Bears; 174/8 (20 overs)
Will Rhodes 51 (36); Hasan Ali 3/32 (4 overs)		Ed Barnard 49 (32); James Neesham 2/30 (4 overs)

Durham won by 8 runs
Riverside Ground, Chester-le-Street
Umpires: Michael Gough and Simon Widdup

- Birmingham Bears won the toss and elected to field.

6 July 2025
14:30
Scorecard

Glamorgan; 118/9 (20 overs)	v	Kent Spitfires; 122/4 (11.4 overs)
Jack Leaning 45* (40); Andy Gorvin 4/17 (4 overs)		Kiran Carlson 34 (19); Fred Klaassen 3/31 (4 overs)

Glamorgan won by 6 wickets
Sophia Gardens, Cardiff
Umpires: Anthony Harris and Rob White

- Glamorgan won the toss and elected to field.

6 July 2025
16:00
Scorecard

Gloucestershire; 204/5 (20 overs)	v	Middlesex; 195/7 (20 overs)
D'Arcy Short 83 (48); Zafar Gohar 3/54 (4 overs)		Stephen Eskinazi 75 (41); Josh Shaw 3/48 (4 overs)

Gloucestershire won by 9 runs
County Ground, Bristol
Umpires: Hassan Adnan and Paul Baldwin

- Middlesex won the toss and elected to field.

6 July 2025
15:00
Scorecard

Hampshire Hawks; 178/3 (20 overs)	v	Somerset; 179/6 (19.5 overs)
James Vince 82 (57); Craig Overton 1/17 (4 overs)		Sean Dickson 52 (33); Scott Currie 3/32 (4 overs)

Somerset won by 4 wickets
Rose Bowl, Southampton
Umpires: Mike Burns and Ben Peverall

- Somerset won the toss and elected to field.

6 July 2025
15:00
Scorecard

Northants Steelbacks; 152/9 (20 overs)	v	Worcestershire Rapids; 153/4 (16.4 overs)
Ben Sanderson 27 (16); Adam Finch 3/28 (4 overs)		Kashif Ali 88 (46); David Willey 2/22 (4 overs)

Worcestershire Rapids won by 6 wickets
County Ground, Northampton
Umpires: Naeem Ashraf and Rob Bailey

- Worcestershire Rapids won the toss and elected to field.

6 July 2025
15:00
Scorecard

Leicestershire Foxes; 188/2 (20 overs)	v	Notts Outlaws; 189/9 (19.5 overs)
Sol Budinger 56 (45); Daniel Sams 1/34 (4 overs)		Joe Clarke 50 (24); Logan van Beek 3/25 (3.5 overs)

Notts Outlaws won by 1 wicket
Trent Bridge, Nottingham
Umpires: Michael Gough and Graham Lloyd

- Leicestershire Foxes won the toss and elected to bat.

6 July 2025
16:30
Scorecard

Surrey; 141/6 (12 overs)	v	Essex Eagles; 145/6 (12 overs)
Jason Roy 30 (17); Luc Benkenstein 2/23 (2 overs)		Paul Walker 55 (26); Adam Zampa 3/14 (3 overs)

Essex Eagles won by 4 wickets (DLS method)
The Oval, London
Umpires: Nigel Llong and Mark Newell

- Essex Eagles won the toss and elected to field.
- The match was reduced to 12 overs per side due to rain.

8 July 2025
18:30 (D/N)
Scorecard

Somerset; 225/6 (20 overs)	v	Essex Eagles; 130 (14.1 overs)
Tom Kohler-Cadmore 90 (39); Mohammad Amir 3/22 (4 overs)		Noah Thain 38 (17); Matt Henry 4/21 (4 overs)

Somerset won by 95 runs
County Ground, Taunton
Umpires: Jack Shantry and Mike Burns
Player of the match: Tom Kohler-Cadmore (Somerset)

- Essex Eagles won the toss and elected to field.
- Charlie Bennett (Essex Eagles) made his T20 debut.

9 July 2025
19:00 (N)
Scorecard

Birmingham Bears; 203/9 (20 overs)	v	Lancashire Lightning; 167 (18.1 overs)
Ed Barnard 54 (34); Jack Blatherwick 3/29 (3 overs)		Tom Hartley 35 (16); George Garton 4/28 (3 overs)

Birmingham Bears won by 36 runs
Edgbaston, Birmingham
Umpires: Rob Bailey and Simon Widdup

- Lancashire Lightning won the toss and elected to field.

9 July 2025
19:00 (N)
Scorecard

Surrey; 193/7 (20 overs)	v	Gloucestershire; 165/9 (20 overs)
Will Jacks 57 (35); Josh Shaw 3/41 (4 overs)		D'Arcy Short 70 (53); Sam Curran 3/32 (4 overs)

Surrey won by 28 runs
County Ground, Bristol
Umpires: Paul Baldwin and Anthony Harris

- Gloucestershire won the toss and elected to field.

9 July 2025
17:00
Scorecard

Middlesex; 187/8 (20 overs)	v	Hampshire Hawks; 188/7 (19.4 overs)
Stephen Eskinazi 94 (48); Scott Currie 4/32 (4 overs)		James Fuller 43* (26); Luke Hollman 2/21 (4 overs)

Hampshire Hawks won by 3 wickets
Merchant Taylors' Ground, Northwood
Umpires: Neil Bainton and Surendiran Shanmugam

- Hampshire Hawks won the toss and elected to field.

9 July 2025
19:00 (N)
Scorecard

Sussex Sharks; 148 (19.5 overs)	v	Kent Spitfires; 151/8 (19.3 overs)
Tom Clark 29 (20); Nathan Gilchrist 4/42 (3.5 overs)		Joey Evison 48* (24); Tymal Mills 3/21 (4 overs)

Kent Spitfire won by 2 wickets
County Ground, Hove
Umpires: Martin Saggers and Jack Shantry

- Sussex Sharks won the toss and elected to bat.

10 July 2025
19:00 (N)
Scorecard

Worcestershire Rapids; 174/6 (20 overs)	v	Derbyshire Falcons; 162/6 (20 overs)
Gareth Roderick 71 (57); Zak Chappell 3/26 (4 overs)		Wayne Madsen 77* (53); Tom Taylor 2/33 (4 overs)

Worcestershire Rapids won by 12 runs
County Ground, Derby
Umpires: James Middlebrook and Tom Lungley
Player of the match: Gareth Roderick (Worcestershire Rapids)

- Worcestershire Rapids won the toss and elected to bat.

10 July 2025
19:00 (N)
Scorecard

Hampshire Hawks; 208/4 (20 overs)	v	Glamorgan; 113 (18.5 overs)
Toby Albert 98* (57); Imad Wasim 1/21 (4 overs)		Asa Tribe 20 (13); Sonny Baker 4/20 (4 overs)

Hampshire Hawks won by 95 runs
Rose Bowl, Southampton
Umpires: Mark Newell and James Tredwell

- Hampshire Hawks won the toss and elected to bat.

10 July 2025
18:30 (D/N)
Scorecard

Northants Steelbacks; 171/7 (20 overs)	v	Leicestershire Foxes; 173/4 (16.1 overs)
Ravi Bopara 53 (40); Josh Hull 2/27 (4 overs)		Rehan Ahmed 52* (30); George Scrimshaw 3/33 (4 overs)

Leicestershire Foxes won by 6 wickets
Grace Road, Leicester
Umpires: Naeem Ashraf and Neil Pratt

- Leicestershire Foxes won the toss and elected to field.
- Joshua Thomas (Leicestershire Foxes) made his T20 debut.

11 July 2025
19:00 (N)
Scorecard

Sussex Sharks; 145 (18.2 overs)	v	Essex Eagles; 148/4 (16.1 overs)
John Simpson 52 (28); Mohammad Amir 3/16 (3 overs)		Michael Pepper 87* (47); Tymal Mills 2/31 (4 overs)

Essex Eagles won by 6 wickets
County Ground, Chelmsford
Umpires: Ben Debenham and Nigel Llong

- Sussex Sharks won the toss and elected to bat.

11 July 2025
18:30 (D/N)
Scorecard

Kent Spitfires; 137/8 (20 overs)	v	Somerset; 138/5 (18.3 overs)
Joe Denly 40 (35); Riley Meredith 3/19 (4 overs)		Lewis Gregory 37 (23); Nathan Gilchrist 1/12 (2 overs)

Somerset won by 5 wickets
St Lawrence Ground, Canterbury
Umpires: Mark Newell and Neil Bainton

- Somerset won the toss and elected to field.

11 July 2025
19:00 (N)
Scorecard

Yorkshire; 236/6 (20 overs)	v	Lancashire Lightning; 217/7 (20 overs)
Jonny Bairstow 116 (54); Chris Green 4/34 (4 overs)		Jos Buttler 55 (33); Jordan Thompson 2/37 (4 overs)

Yorkshire won by 19 runs
Old Trafford, Manchester
Umpires: Michael Gough and Rob White
Player of the match: Jonny Bairstow (Yorkshire)

- Yorkshire won the toss and elected to bat.

11 July 2025
17:00
Scorecard

Middlesex; 189/5 (20 overs)	v	Gloucestershire; 166/7 (20 overs)
Leus du Plooy 54 (37); Marchant de Lange 2/30 (4 overs)		D'Arcy Short 64 (46); Luke Hollman 2/30 (3 overs)

Middlesex won by 23 runs
Merchant Taylors' Ground, Northwood
Umpires: Hassan Adnan and Naeem Ashraf

- Middlesex won the toss and elected to bat.
- Sebastian Morgan (Middlesex) made his T20 debut.

11 July 2025
18:30 (D/N)
Scorecard

Northants Steelbacks; 237/4 (20 overs)	v	Derbyshire Falcons; 224/6 (20 overs)
Matthew Breetzke 93 (45); Ben Aitchison 2/57 (4 overs)		Aneurin Donald 71 (22); Lloyd Pope 2/29 (3 overs)

Northants Steelbacks won by 13 runs
County Ground, Northampton
Umpires: James Middlebrook and Tom Lungley

- Derbyshire Falcons won the toss and elected to field.

11 July 2025
18:30 (D/N)
Scorecard

Durham; 156 (20 overs)	v	Notts Outlaws; 159/3 (18.4 overs)
Graham Clark 44 (27); Daniel Sams 4/26 (4 overs)		Jack Haynes 55* (40); Matthew Potts 1/22 (3 overs)

Notts Outlaws won by 7 wickets
Trent Bridge, Nottingham
Umpires: David Millns and Steve O'Shaughnessy

- Durham won the toss and elected to bat.

11 July 2025
18:30 (D/N)
Scorecard

Glamorgan; 222/6 (20 overs)	v	Surrey; 224/4 (19.1 overs)
Colin Ingram 69 (33); Sam Curran 2/31 (4 overs)		Dan Lawrence 120* (54); Ned Leonard 2/38 (4 overs)

Surrey won by 6 wickets
The Oval, London
Umpires: James Tredwell and Martin Saggers

- Glamorgan won the toss and elected to bat.
- Dan Lawrence (Surrey) scored his maiden century in T20s.

11 July 2025
17:30 (D/N)
Scorecard

Birmingham Bears; 176 (19.5 overs)	v	Worcestershire Rapids; 153 (19.3 overs)
Sam Hain 44 (35); Ben Dwarshuis 3/30 (4 overs)		Adam Hose 51 (36); Hasan Ali 3/32 (4 overs)

Birmingham Bears won by 23 runs
New Road, Worcester
Umpires: Ben Peverall and Mike Burns

- Worcestershire Rapids won the toss and elected to field.

13 July 2025
15:00
Scorecard

Northants Steelbacks; 240/6 (20 overs)	v	Birmingham Bears; 176 (20 overs)
Matthew Breetzke 85 (40); Craig Miles 2/34 (2 overs)		Sam Hain 50 (29); George Scrimshaw 3/33 (3 overs)

Northants Steelbacks won by 64 runs
Edgbaston, Birmingham
Umpires: Tom Lungley and James Middlebrook

- Northants Steelbacks won the toss and elected to bat.

13 July 2025
15:00
Scorecard

Gloucestershire; 175/6 (20 overs)	v	Glamorgan; 135 (18.1 overs)
Ben Charlesworth 55 (44); Ben Kellaway 2/12 (2 overs)		William Smale 43 (27); Marchant de Lange 4/20 (4 overs)

Gloucestershire won by 40 runs
Sophia Gardens, Cardiff
Umpires: Mike Burns and Ben Peverall

- Gloucestershire won the toss and elected bat.

13 July 2025
15:00
Scorecard

Sussex Sharks; 167/7 (20 overs)	v	Hampshire Hawks; 171/4 (17.2 overs)
Tom Clark 39 (24); James Fuller 3/16 (2 overs)		James Vince 98* (49); Danny Lamb 2/25 (3.2 overs)

Hampshire Hawks won by 6 wickets
Rose Bowl, Southampton
Umpires: Nigel Llong and Surendiran Shanmugam

- Sussex won the toss and elected to bat.

13 July 2025
16:00
Scorecard

Middlesex; 160/5 (20 overs)	v	Kent Spitfires; 165/3 (18.1 overs)
Leus du Plooy 68 (45); Fred Klaassen 3/39 (4 overs)		Tawanda Muyeye 59 (41); Zafar Gohar 1/22 (3 overs)

Kent Spitfires won by 7 wickets
St Lawrence Ground, Canterbury
Umpires: Ben Debenham and Martin Saggers

- Middlesex won the toss and elected to bat.

13 July 2025
15:00
Scorecard

Durham; 155/7 (20 overs)	v	Lancashire Lightning; 156/7 (18.4 overs)
Colin Ackermann 42 (35); Chris Green 3/15 (4 overs)		Keaton Jennings 42 (33); Nathan Sowter 2/24 (4 overs)

Lancashire Lightning won by 3 wickets
Old Trafford, Manchester
Umpires: David Millns and Neil Pratt

- Durham won the toss and elected to bat.

13 July 2025
15:30
Scorecard

Surrey; 201/6 (20 overs)	v	Somerset; 134 (19.3 overs)
Will Jacks 57 (37); Lewis Goldsworthy 2/39 (4 overs)		Tom Kohler-Cadmore 38 (23); Reece Topley 3/20 (4 overs)

Surrey won by 67 runs
The Oval, London
Umpires: Hassan Adnan and Mark Newell

- Somerset won the toss and elected to field.

13 July 2025
14:30
Scorecard

Leicestershire Foxes; 173/6 (20 overs)	v	Worcestershire Rapids; 176/4 (17.5 overs)
Ben Cox 70* (44); Tom Taylor 3/25 (4 overs)		Ethan Brookes 56* (28); Tom Scriven 2/22 (4 overs)

Worcestershire Rapids won by 6 wickets
New Road, Worcester
Umpires: Naeem Ashraf and Steve O'Shaughnessy

- Leicestershire Foxes won the toss and elected to bat.

13 July 2025
15:00
Scorecard

Yorkshire; 151/9 (20 overs)	v	Derbyshire Falcons; 157/2 (16.4 overs)
Dom Bess 53 (37); Ben Aitchison 5/29 (4 overs)		Aneurin Donald 54 (30); Dan Moriarty 2/26 (4 overs)

Derbyshire Falcons won by 8 wickets
Headingley, Leeds
Umpires: Paul Baldwin and Michael Gough

- Derbyshire Falcons won the toss and elected to field.
- Ben Aitchison (Yorkshire) took his maiden five-wicket haul in T20s.

15 July 2025
18:30 (D/N)
Scorecard

Durham	v	Leicestershire Foxes

Match abandoned
Riverside Ground, Chester-le-Street
Umpires: Michael Gough and David Millns

- No toss.
- No play was possible due to rain.

16 July 2025
18:15 (D/N)
Scorecard

Surrey; 189/9 (20 overs)	v	Middlesex; 181/6 (20 overs)
Will Jacks 52 (36); Ryan Higgins 4/33 (4 overs)		Stephen Eskinazi 53 (38); Chris Jordan 2/28 (4 overs)

Surrey won by 8 runs
Lord's, London
Umpires: Martin Saggers and Russell Warren

- Surrey won the toss and elected to bat.

17 July 2025
19:00 (N)
Scorecard

Hampshire Hawks; 220/6 (20 overs)	v	Essex Eagles; 222/6 (19.2 overs)
Toby Albert 84 (55); Simon Harmer 2/27 (3 overs)		Jordan Cox 139* (60); Liam Dawson 2/22 (4 overs)

Essex Eagles won by 4 wickets
County Ground, Chelmsford
Umpires: Neil Bainton and Simon Widdup

- Essex Eagles won the toss and elected to field.
- Jordan Cox (Essex Eagles) scored his first century in T20s.

17 July 2025
16:00
Scorecard

Gloucestershire; 185/5 (20 overs)	v	Sussex Sharks; 189/6 (20 overs)
D'Arcy Short 66 (45); Henry Crocombe 3/32 (4 overs)		James Coles 62 (40); Josh Shaw 2/25 (4 overs)

Sussex Sharks won by 4 wickets
College Ground, Cheltenham
Umpires: Anthony Harris and Richard Illingworth

- Gloucestershire won the toss and elected to bat.

17 July 2025
17:30 (D/N)
Scorecard

Worcestershire Rapids; 206/7 (20 overs)	v	Notts Outlaws; 161 (18.2 overs)
Ethan Brookes 57 (20); Dillon Pennington 3/34 (4 overs)		Tom Moores 57 (29); Ethan Brookes 3/30 (4 overs)

Worcestershire Rapids won by 45 runs
New Road, Worcester
Umpires: Mike Burn and Ben Peverall

- Notts Outlaws won the toss and elected to field.
- Ben Gibbon (Worcestershire Rapids) made his T20 debut.

17 July 2025
18:30 (D/N)
Scorecard

Lancashire Lightning; 174 (19.5 overs)	v	Yorkshire; 153 (19.1 overs)
Jos Buttler 77 (46); Matt Milnes 2/27 (4 overs)		Abdullah Shafique 54 (34); James Anderson 3/24 (4 overs)

Lancashire Lightning won by 21 runs
Headingley, Leeds
Umpires: James Middlebrook and Steve O'Shaughnessy
Player of the match: Jos Buttler (Lancashire Lightning)

- Lancashire Lightning won the toss and elected bat.
- Jos Buttler (Lancashire Lightning) scored his 13,000th run in T20s.

18 July 2025
18:30 (D/N)
Scorecard

Birmingham Bears; 233/5 (20 overs)	v	Derbyshire Falcons; 106 (15.1 overs)
Tom Latham 104 (51); Ben Aitchison 4/45 (4 overs)		Zak Chappell 23 (14); Jake Lintott 3/27 (4 overs)

Birmingham Bears won by 127 runs
County Ground, Derby
Umpires: Tom Lungley and James Middlebrook

- Birmingham Bears won the toss and elected to bat.

18 July 2025
18:30 (D/N)
Scorecard

Northants Steelbacks; 203/5 (20 overs)	v	Durham; 204/1 (16.3 overs)
David Willey 63 (32); Matthew Potts 3/27 (4 overs)		Alex Lees 101* (49); Luke Procter 1/27 (3 overs)

Durham won by 9 wickets
Riverside Ground, Chester-le-Street
Umpires: Michael Gough and Graham Lloyd

- Northants Steelbacks won the toss and elected to bat.
- Alex Lees (Durham) scored his maiden century in T20s.

18 July 2025
18:30 (D/N)
Scorecard

Glamorgan; 184/9 (20 overs)	v	Middlesex; 132 (18.5 overs)
Kiran Carlson 49 (19); Noah Cornwell 3/34 (4 overs)		Kane Williamson 63 (42); Dan Douthwaite 4/22 (3.5 overs)

Glamorgan won by 52 runs
Sophia Gardens, Cardiff
Umpires: Mike Burns and Jack Shantry

- Glamorgan won the toss and elected to field.
- James Feldman (Middlesex) made his T20 debut.

18 July 2025
18:30 (D/N)
Scorecard

Essex Eagles; 172/6 (20 overs)	v	Kent Spitfires; 173/3 (17.2 overs)
Paul Walter 52 (37); Nathan Gilchrist 2/35 (2 overs)		Tawanda Muyeye 80 (49); Matt Critchley 1/18 (3 overs)

Kent Spitfires won by 7 wickets
St Lawrence Ground, Canterbury
Umpires: Rob Bailey and Martin Saggers

- Kent Spitfires won the toss and elected to field.

18 July 2025
18:30 (D/N)
Scorecard

Leicestershire Foxes; 185 (18.5 overs)	v	Yorkshire; 188/8 (20 overs)
Rehan Ahmed 43 (29); Will Sutherland 3/20 (3.5 overs)		Abdullah Shafique 64 (38); Logan van Beek 3/35 (4 overs)

Yorkshire won by 2 wickets
Grace Road, Leicester
Umpires: Naeem Ashraf and Steve O'Shaughnessy

- Yorkshire won the toss and field.

18 July 2025
18:30 (D/N)
Scorecard

Lancashire Lightning; 126 (20 overs)	v	Notts Outlaws; 127/6 (15.2 overs)
Matthew Hurst 36 (32); Farhan Ahmed 5/25 (4 overs)		Tom Moores 70 (42); Luke Wood 2/20 (3 overs)

Notts Outlaws won by 4 wickets
Trent Bridge, Nottingham
Umpires: Neil Pratt and Russell Warren
Player of the match: Tom Moores (Notts Outlaws)

- Lancashire Lightning won the toss and elected to bat.
- Sam Seecharan (Notts Outlaws) made his T20 debut.
- Farhan Ahmed (Lancashire Lightning) took his maiden five-wicket haul in T20s.

18 July 2025
18:30 (D/N)
Scorecard

Somerset; 164/7 (20 overs)	v	Gloucestershire; 148/8 (20 overs)
Ben Green 36 (22); Jack Taylor 3/18 (4 overs)		D'Arcy Short 71* (52); Jake Ball 2/20 (4 overs)

Somerset won by 16 runs
County Ground, Taunton
Umpires: Ian Blackwell and Mark Newell

- Somerset won the toss and elected to bat.
- Tommy Boorman (Gloucestershire) made his T20 debut.

18 July 2025
18:30 (D/N)
Scorecard

Surrey; 204/5 (20 overs)	v	Sussex Sharks; 197/7 (20 overs)
Will Jacks 100 (59); Henry Crocombe 2/37 (4 overs)		Daniel Hughes 75 (43); Sam Curran 4/18 (3 overs)

Surrey won by 7 runs
County Ground, Hove
Umpires: Ben Debenham and Chris Watts

- Surrey won the toss and elected to bat.

== Knock-out stage ==
=== Bracket ===
Quarter-finals
S1	Surrey	147/6 (14 overs)
N4	Northants Steelbacks	154/4 (14 overs)
N2	Durham	195/6 (20 overs)
S3	Hampshire Hawks	221/8 (20 overs)
N1	Lancashire Lightning	156/7 (18.3 overs)
S4	Kent Spitfires	153 (20 overs)
S2	Somerset	191/6 (19.5 overs)
N3	Birmingham Bears	190/6 (20 overs)

Semi-finals
QF1	Northants Steelbacks	158/7 (18 overs)
QF2	Hampshire Hawks	155/4 (15.4 overs)
QF3	Lancashire Lightning	159 (19.5 overs)
QF4	Somerset	182/7 (20 overs)

Final
SF1	Hampshire Hawks	194/6 (20 overs)
SF2	Somerset	195/4 (19 overs)

=== Quarter-finals ===
Quarter-final 1
3 September 2025
18:30 (D/N)
Scorecard

Northants Steelbacks; 154/4 (14 overs)	v	Surrey; 147/6 (14 overs)
Ravi Bopara 105* (46); Jordan Clark 3/13 (3 overs)		Sam Curran 69* (38); George Scrimshaw 3/34 (3 overs)

Northants Steelbacks won by 7 runs
The Oval, London
Umpires: Ian Blackwell and Robert White
Player of the match: Ravi Bopara (Northants Steelbacks)

- Surrey won the toss and elected to field.
- The match was reduced to 14 overs per side due to rain.

Quarter-final 2
5 September 2025
18:30 (D/N)
Scorecard

Hampshire Hawks; 221/8 (20 overs)	v	Durham; 195/6 (20 overs)
Toby Albert 68 (37); Matthew Potts 4/35 (2 overs)		Ollie Robinson 60* (33); Benny Howell 4/28 (2 overs)

Hampshire Hawks won by 26 runs
Riverside Ground, Chester-le-Street
Umpires: Graham Lloyd and Tom Lungley
Player of the match: Toby Albert (Hampshire Hawks)

- Durham won the toss and elected to field.

Quarter-final 3
6 September 2025
14:30
Scorecard

Kent Spitfires; 153 (20 overs)	v	Lancashire Lightning; 156/7 (18.3 overs)
Joe Denly 28 (20); Luke Wood 3/29 (4 overs)		Liam Livingstone 85* (45); Fred Klaassen 3/14 (4 overs)

Lancashire Lightning won by 3 wickets
Old Trafford, Manchester
Umpires: Michael Gough and James Middlebrook
Player of the match: Liam Livingstone (Lancashire Lightning)

- Kent Spitfires won the toss and elected to bat.

Quarter-final 4
6 September 2025
18:30 (D/N)
Scorecard

Birmingham Bears; 190/6 (20 overs)	v	Somerset; 191/6 (19.5 overs)
Alex Davies 71 (39); Ben Green 2/30 (4 overs)		Sean Dickson 71* (26); Oliver Hannon-Dalby 3/24 (4 overs)

Somerset won by 4 wickets
County Ground, Taunton
Umpires: Ben Debenham and Martin Saggers
Player of the match: Sean Dickson (Somerset)

- Birmingham Bears won the toss and elected to bat.

== Finals Day ==
=== Semi-finals ===
Semi-final 1
13 September 2025
11:00
Scorecard

Somerset; 182/7 (20 overs)	v	Lancashire Lightning; 159 (19.5 overs)
Tom Kohler-Cadmore 81 (52); George Balderson 3/31 (3 overs)		Keaton Jennings 44 (28); Migael Pretorius 3/27 (3.5 overs)

Somerset won by 23 runs
Edgbaston, Birmingham
Umpires: Michael Gough and James Middlebrook
Player of the match: Tom Kohler-Cadmore (Somerset)

- Lancashire Lightning won the toss and elected to field.
- Arav Shetty (Lancashire) made his T20 debut.

Semi-final 2
13 September 2025
14:30
Scorecard

Northants Steelbacks; 158/7 (18 overs)	v	Hampshire Hawks; 155/4 (15.4 overs)
Justin Broad 61* (39); Scott Currie 2/34 (4 overs)		Chris Lynn 108* (51); Saif Zaib 3/18 (4 overs)

Hampshire Hawks won by 6 wickets
Edgbaston, Birmingham
Umpires: Tom Lungley and Robert White
Player of the match: Chris Lynn (Hampshire Hawks)

- Hampshire Hawks won the toss and elected to field.
- The match was reduced to 18 overs per side due to rain.

=== Final ===
13 September 2025
18:45 (N)
Scorecard

Hampshire Hawks; 194/6 (20 overs)	v	Somerset; 195/4 (19 overs)
Toby Albert 85 (48); Jake Ball 2/39 (4 overs)		Will Smeed 94 (58); Scott Currie 2/44 (4 overs)

Somerset won by 6 wickets
Edgbaston, Birmingham
Umpires: James Middlebrook and Michael Gough
Player of the match: Will Smeed (Somerset)

- Somerset won the toss and elected to field.
