= Kasey Aldridge =

English cricketer (born 2000)

Personal information
- Full name: Kasey Luke Aldridge
- Born: 24 December 2000 (age 25); Bristol, England
- Batting: Right-handed
- Bowling: Right-arm fast-medium
- Role: Bowler

Domestic team information
- Years: Team
- 2021–2025: Somerset (squad no. 5)
- 2025: → Durham (on loan) (squad no. 55)
- 2026: Durham (squad no. 55)
- FC debut: 6 July 2021 Somerset v Leicestershire
- LA debut: 25 July 2021 Somerset v Derbyshire

Career statistics
Competition	FC	LA	T20
Matches	49	39	25
Runs scored	1,581	331	226
Batting average	26.79	19.47	17.38
100s/50s	2/7	0/1	0/0
Top score	180	78	44*
Balls bowled	5,957	1,454	299
Wickets	107	49	21
Bowling average	37.02	30.16	25.42
5 wickets in innings	6	2	1
10 wickets in match	0	0	0
Best bowling	6/110	6/33	5/29
Catches/stumpings	52/–	23/–	24/–
- Source: Cricinfo, 27 September 2026

Kasey Luke Aldridge (born 24 December 2000) is an English cricketer. He made his first-class debut in July 2021, for Somerset on the third day of their 2021 County Championship match against Leicestershire as a substitute for Craig Overton following his international call-up. Prior to his first-class debut, Aldridge was named in England's squad for the 2020 Under-19 Cricket World Cup.

== Career ==
After attending Millfield School, Aldridge was already 6 feet 4 inches (1.93 m) when aged 17 he signed his first contract with Somerset, having played through all the age groups at the club and playing club cricket in Brislington and Weston-super-Mare. Aldridge began representing England at under-19 level in 2019.

On 8 June 2021, Aldridge took four wickets in four balls against Glamorgan Second XI dismissing David Lloyd and Marnus Labuschagne with the last two balls of one over, and then dismissing Chris Cooke and Kiran Carlson with his first two of his next over in the Somerset Second XI game at Taunton Vale. He made his List A debut on 25 July 2021, for Somerset in the 2021 Royal London One-Day Cup. He made his Twenty20 debut on 27 May 2022, for Somerset against the Sri Lanka Cricket Development XI during their tour of England.

In May 2025, Aldridge joined Durham on loan for the first eight matches of that year's T20 Blast. In August 2025, he agreed to join Durham permanently on a three-year contract starting from the 2026 season.
