= Ajeet Singh Dale =

English cricketer (born 2000)

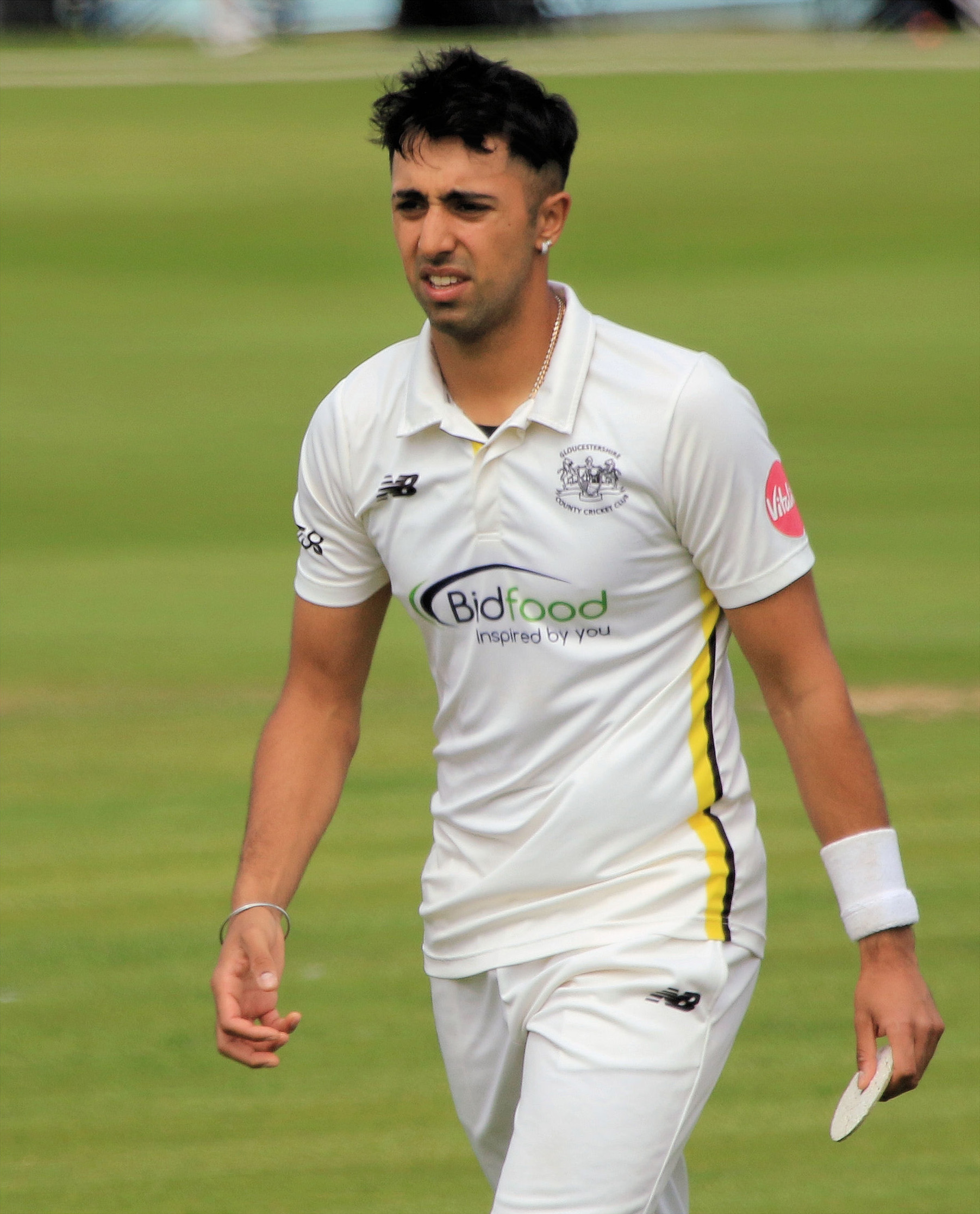
- Singh Dale in 2024

Personal information
- Full name: Ajeet Singh Dale
- Born: 2 July 2000 (age 26); Slough, Berkshire, England
- Batting: Right-handed
- Bowling: Right-arm fast
- Role: Bowler

Domestic team information
- Years: Team
- 2020–2021: Hampshire (squad no. 39)
- 2022–2025: Gloucestershire (squad no. 39)
- 2025: Welsh Fire
- 2026–: Lancashire (squad no. 39)
- First-class debut: 1 August 2020 Hampshire v Sussex
- List A debut: 19 August 2022 Gloucestershire v Surrey

Career statistics
Competition	FC	LA	T20
Matches	42	11	19
Runs scored	417	83	5
Batting average	11.58	20.75	1.25
100s/50s	0/1	0/1	0/0
Top score	52	63	4*
Balls bowled	6,165	528	372
Wickets	104	19	20
Bowling average	35.84	22.68	32.50
5 wickets in innings	3	0	0
10 wickets in match	0	0	0
Best bowling	7/110	4/15	3/17
Catches/stumpings	6/–	3/–	2/–
- Source: Cricinfo, 5 May 2026

Ajeet Singh Dale (born 3 July 2000) is an English cricketer. He made his first-class debut on 1 August 2020, for Hampshire in the 2020 Bob Willis Trophy. He made his Twenty20 debut on 29 May 2022, for Gloucestershire against the Sri Lanka Cricket Development XI during their tour of England. In August 2025, it announced a three-year contract to join Lancashire Country Cricket Club at the end of that year's season.
