= Michael Pepper (cricketer) =

English cricketer (born 1998)

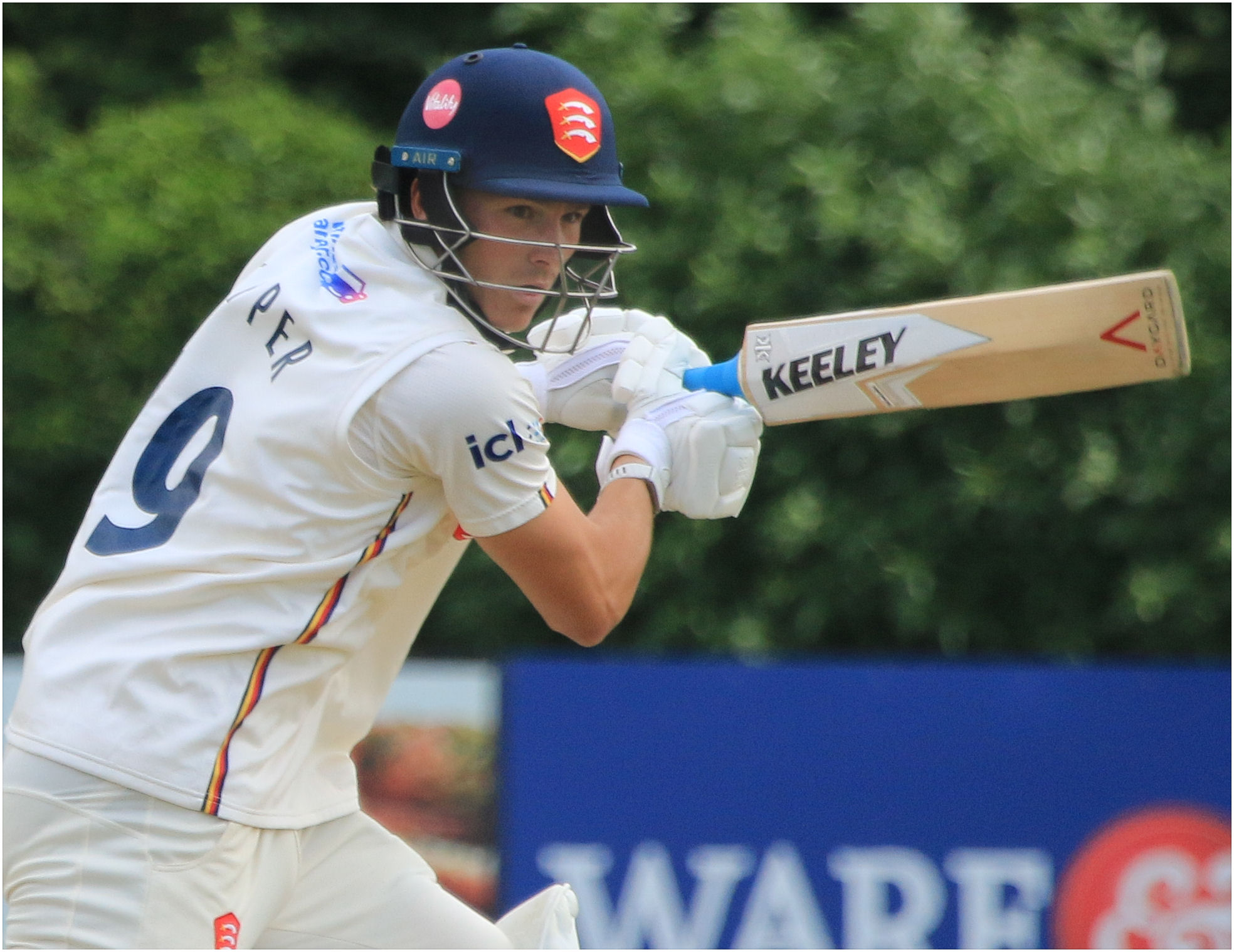
- Pepper in 2025

Personal information
- Full name: Michael-Kyle Steven Pepper
- Born: 25 June 1998 (age 28); Harlow, Essex, England
- Batting: Right-handed
- Role: Wicket-keeper

Domestic team information
- Years: Team
- 2014–2018: Cambridgeshire
- 2018–present: Essex (squad no. 19)
- 2022: Northern Superchargers
- 2023–2025: London Spirit
- 2024–2025/26: Abu Dhabi Knight Riders
- 2026: Joburg Super Kings
- 2026: Southern Brave
- First-class debut: 25 June 2018 Essex v Somerset
- List A debut: 22 July 2021 Essex v Hampshire

Career statistics
Competition	FC	LA	T20
Matches	50	7	140
Runs scored	1,959	134	3,249
Batting average	28.80	26.80	26.20
100s/50s	5/7	0/1	2/19
Top score	140	63	120*
Catches/stumpings	129/5	0/0	66/4
- Source: Cricinfo, 6 September 2026

Michael-Kyle Steven Pepper (born 25 June 1998) is an English cricketer. He made his first-class debut for Essex in the 2018 County Championship on 25 June 2018. He made his Twenty20 debut for Essex in the 2018 t20 Blast on 3 August 2018. He made his List A debut on 22 July 2021, for Essex in the 2021 Royal London One-Day Cup. In October 2024, Pepper was called-up into the England squad for their One-Day series against the West Indies.
