= Ned Leonard =

English cricketer (born 2002)

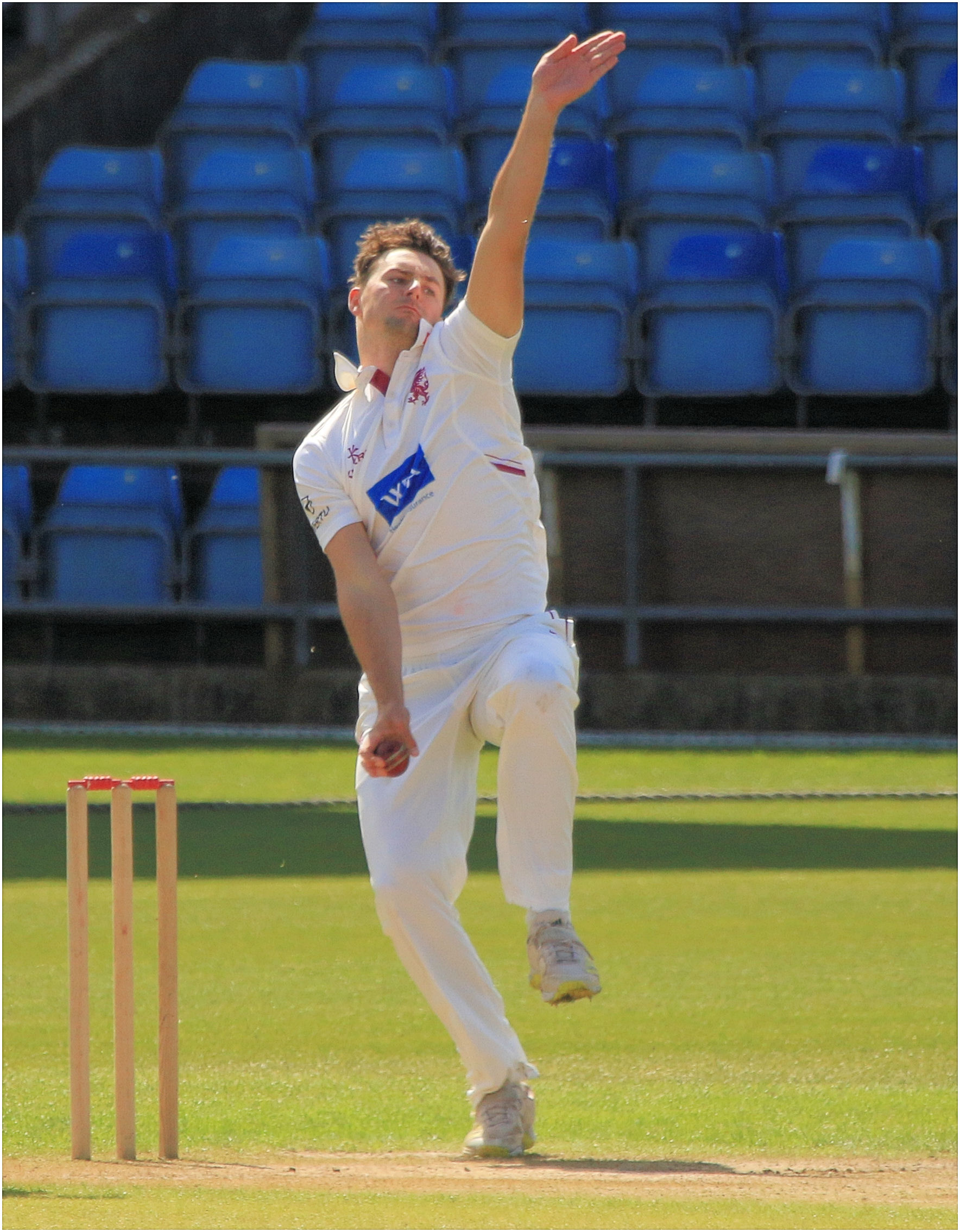
- Leonard in 2024

Personal information
- Full name: Edward Owen Leonard
- Born: 15 August 2002 (age 24); Hammersmith, London, England
- Batting: Right-handed
- Bowling: Right-arm fast-medium
- Role: Bowler

Domestic team information
- Years: Team
- 2021–2024: Somerset (squad no. 19)
- 2024: → Glamorgan (on loan)
- 2025–: Glamorgan
- First-class debut: 12 September 2021 Somerset v Lancashire
- List A debut: 30 July 2021 Somerset v Nottinghamshire

Career statistics
Competition	FC	LA	T20
Matches	14	20	15
Runs scored	185	99	12
Batting average	16.81	16.50	4.00
100s/50s	0/0	0/0	0/0
Top score	47	32	7*
Balls bowled	1,728	863	312
Wickets	22	19	25
Bowling average	53.95	49.52	17.08
5 wickets in innings	0	0	1
10 wickets in match	0	0	0
Best bowling	3/66	3/40	5/25
Catches/stumpings	3/–	6/–	3/–
- Source: Cricinfo, 15 July 2026

Edward Owen Leonard (born 15 August 2002) is an English cricketer. After completing his education at Millfield, in September 2020, Leonard was awarded a two-year professional contract with Somerset County Cricket Club graduating from the club's academy. He made his List A debut on 30 July 2021, for Somerset in the 2021 Royal London One-Day Cup. He made his first-class debut on 12 September 2021, for Somerset in the 2021 County Championship. He made his Twenty20 debut on 27 May 2022, for Somerset against the Sri Lanka Cricket Development XI during their tour of England.

In August 2024, Leonard joined Glamorgan on loan. He made the move permanent in October 2024, signing a two-year contract. In June 2026, Leonard agreed a two-year contract extension with Glamorgan which tied him into the club until at least the end of the 2028 season.
