= Gareth Roderick =

South African cricketer

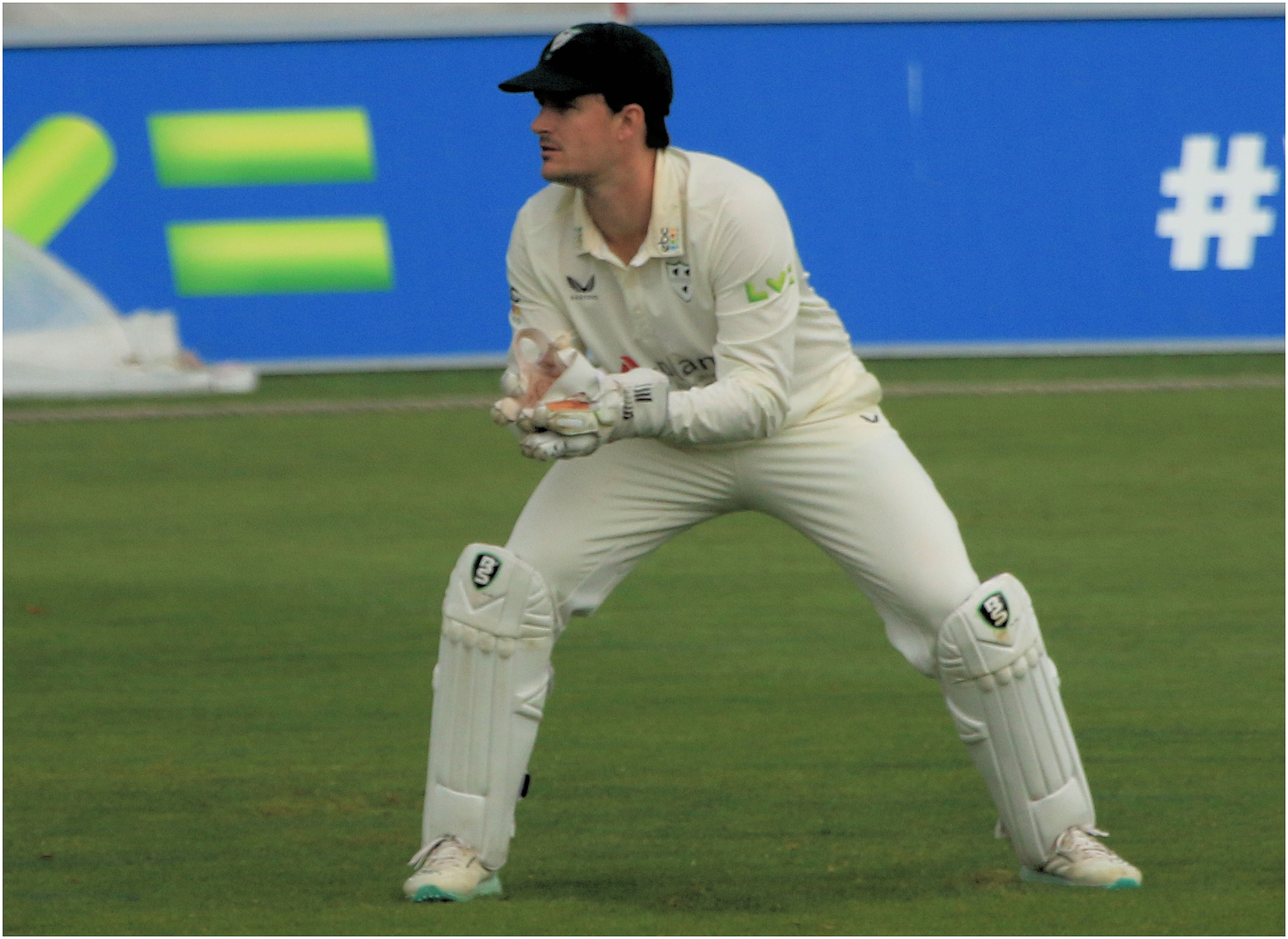
- Roderick in 2023

Personal information
- Full name: Gareth Hugh Roderick
- Born: 29 August 1991 (age 35); Durban, Natal Province, South Africa
- Batting: Right-handed
- Bowling: Right-arm medium
- Role: Wicket-keeper

Domestic team information
- Years: Team
- 2011–2012: KwaZulu-Natal
- 2013–2020: Gloucestershire (squad no. 17)
- 2021–present: Worcestershire (squad no. 9)
- FC debut: 24 March 2011 KZN v Free State
- LA debut: 27 March 2011 KZN v Free State

Career statistics
Competition	FC	LA	T20
Matches	165	85	88
Runs scored	7,996	2,161	1,060
Batting average	33.17	32.25	20.78
100s/50s	13/44	5/10	0/2
Top score	172*	152*	71
Catches/stumpings	481/8	87/12	59/4
- Source: ESPNcricinfo, 27 September 2026

Gareth Hugh Roderick (born 29 August 1991) is an English-South African cricketer who plays for Worcestershire County Cricket Club.

He is a right-handed batsman who also plays as a wicket-keeper. Roderick made his first-class debut for KwaZulu-Natal against Free State on 24 March 2011.

Roderick was spotted by Gloucestershire whilst playing league cricket for Cheltenham Cricket Club in the West of England Premier League. He subsequently signed a two-year contract with Gloucestershire in the autumn of 2012, having qualified as a non-overseas player due to having an English mother. He originally came over to England in 2010 playing for Old Cricket Club where he broke the league record for the Northants Cricket League. He also broke the league club record for the highest score. After a successful first county season, where he averaged 44.33 and scored over 600 runs, he signed a contract extension until 2016.

Ahead of the 2021 county season, Roderick joined Worcestershire on a three-year contract.
