= Ben Peverall =

English cricket umpire

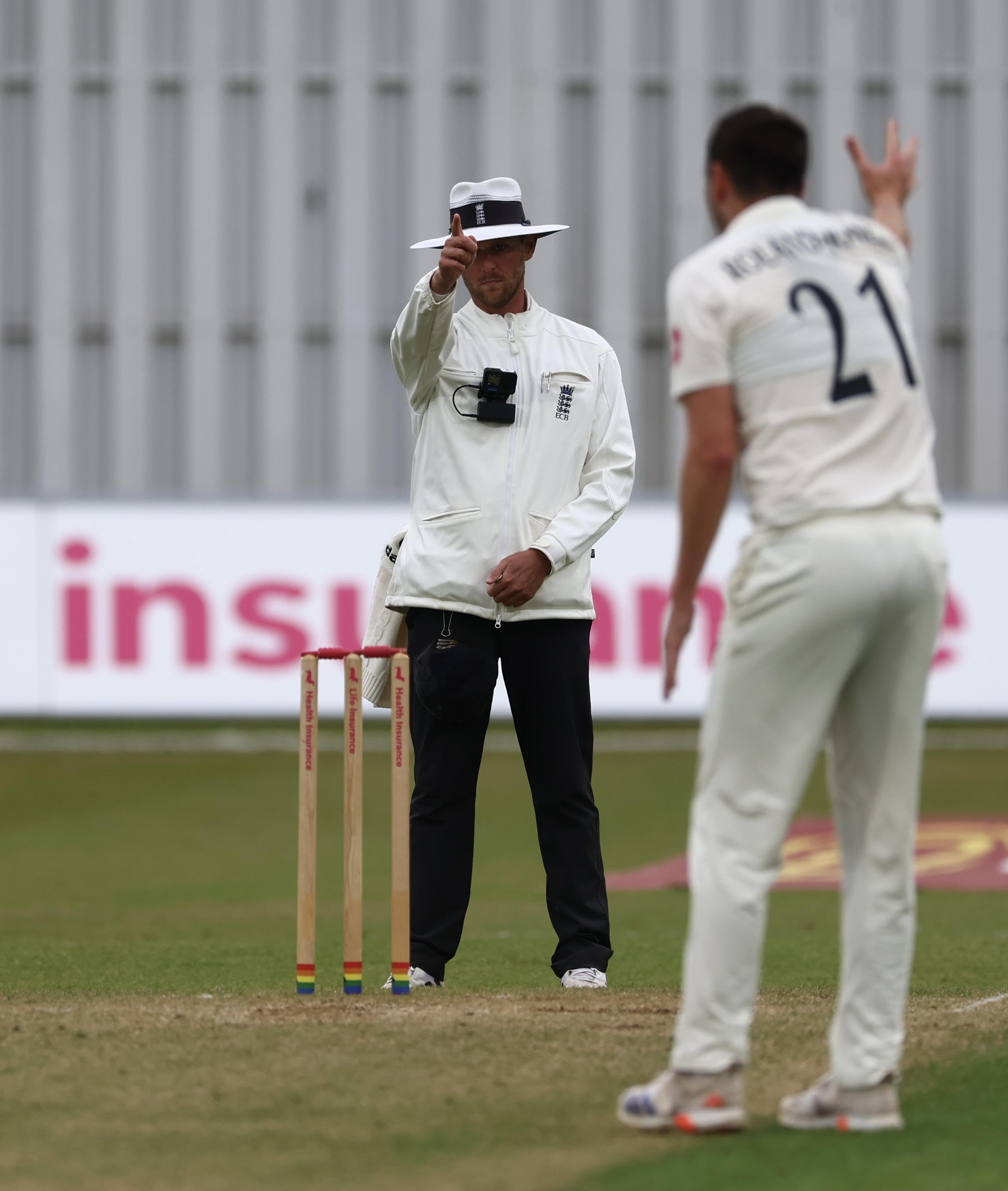

Personal information
- Full name: Benjamin John Peverall
- Born: 23 January 1992 (age 34); Bristol, England
- Role: Umpire

Umpiring information
- WT20Is umpired: 3 (2024)
- FC umpired: 12 (2024–present)
- LA umpired: 34 (2022–present)
- T20 umpired: 21 (2023–present)
- Source: ESPNcricinfo, 05 October 2026

Benjamin John Peverall (born 23 January 1992) is an English cricket umpire. He was born in Bristol, and currently resides in Somerset.

Peverall started umpiring in 2014 in the West of England Premier League before being elevated to the ECB National Panel of Umpires in 2019, standing in ECB Second XI Championship and National Counties Cricket Association fixtures. During this time, he began his county career standing in women's List A matches, the first coming in the 2014 Women's One Day Cup, in Somerset's win over Ireland. He stood in four more Women's One Day Cup matches between 2014 and 2018, all involving Somerset. His first Women's Twenty20 match came on 5 July 2015, when he stood in two of the three matches at the Bath Cricket Club Ground involving Somerset, Ireland and Surrey.

Peverall umpired his first professional fixture, a men's List A match, on 2 August 2022, standing in Kent's win over Worcestershire in the 2022 One-Day Cup. In 2023, he joined the ECB's Professional Umpires' Team, and in his debut year appeared in his first men's Twenty20 match on 3 June 2023, when he stood in Hampshire's win over Sussex in the T20 Blast. In January 2024, he was one of the umpires selected to officiate at the 2024 Women's T20I Pacific Cup; he stood in six of the matches, including three that were given WT20I status.

His maiden first-class match came in June 2024, when he umpired Leicestershire's win over Middlesex in the 2024 County Championship at Grace Road, Leicester.
