= Ben Green (cricketer) =

English cricketer (born 1997)

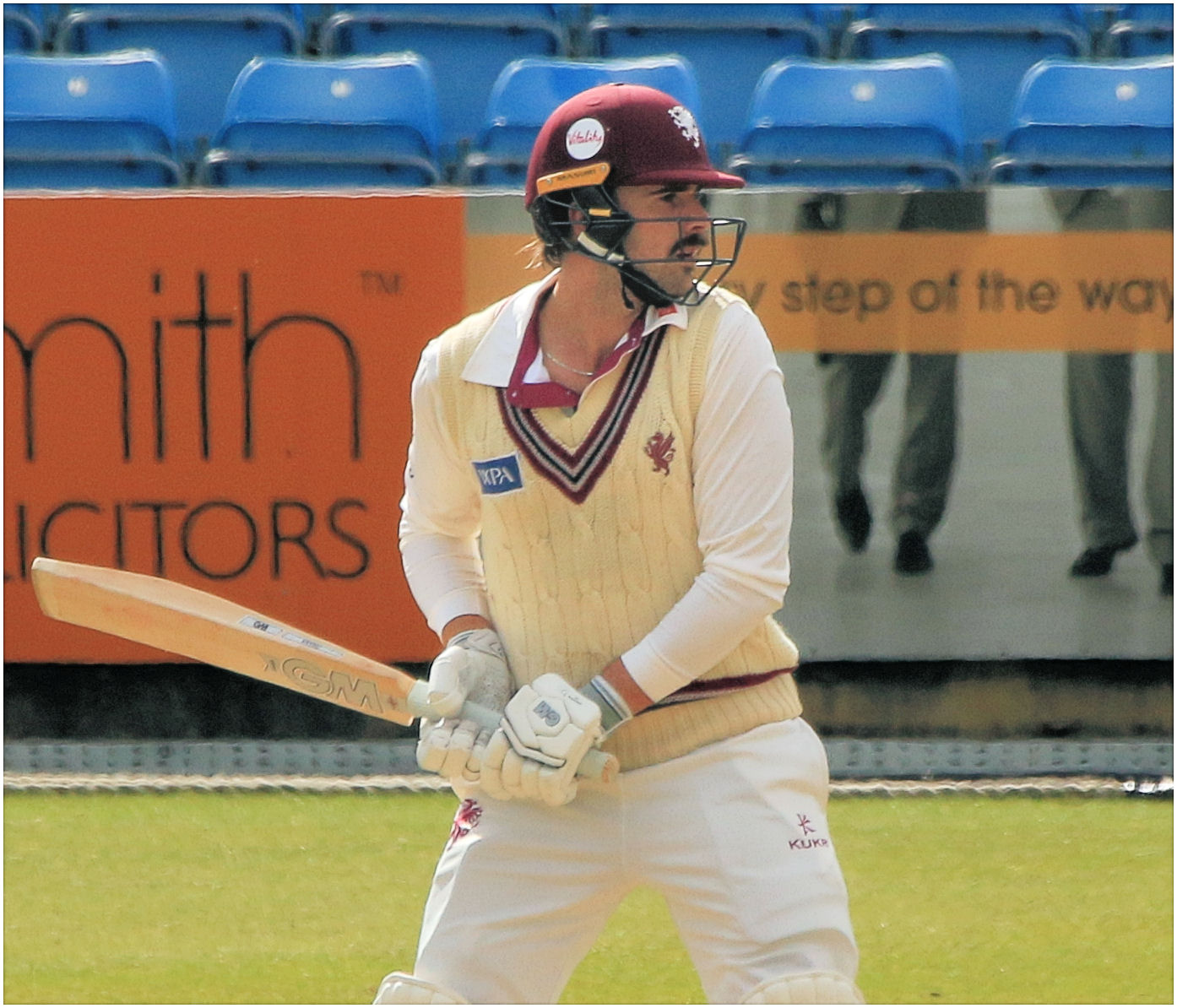
- Green batting in 2024.

Personal information
- Full name: Benjamin George Frederick Green
- Born: 28 September 1997 (age 29); Exeter, Devon, England
- Batting: Right-handed
- Bowling: Right-arm medium-fast
- Role: All-rounder

Domestic team information
- Years: Team
- 2016–2025: Somerset (squad no. 54)
- 2023–2024: Welsh Fire
- 2024–2025: → Leicestershire (on loan)
- 2026: Leicestershire (squad no. 6)
- First-class debut: 4 September 2018 Somerset v Lancashire
- List A debut: 29 May 2018 Somerset v Kent

Career statistics
Competition	FC	LA	T20
Matches	44	33	102
Runs scored	1,193	596	969
Batting average	18.93	37.25	19.00
100s/50s	0/3	1/2	0/0
Top score	77	157	47
Balls bowled	5,147	1,479	1,660
Wickets	87	44	115
Bowling average	27.58	29.90	22.83
5 wickets in innings	2	0	2
10 wickets in match	0	0	0
Best bowling	7/112	4/52	5/29
Catches/stumpings	17/–	14/–	30/–
- Source: CricketArchive, 26 September 2026

Benjamin George Frederick Green (born 28 September 1997) is an English cricketer who plays for Leicestershire County Cricket Club. He is a right-arm fast-medium pace bowler who also bats right-handed. He progressed through the Devon age group system before being offered a first team contract during the 2016 season. On 29 July 2016 he made his Twenty20 debut for Somerset against Hampshire in the 2016 NatWest t20 Blast.

On 3 August 2016, Green signed a three-year professional contract with Somerset. He made his List A debut for Somerset in the 2018 Royal London One-Day Cup on 29 May 2018. He made his first-class debut for Somerset in the 2018 County Championship on 4 September 2018.

In June 2022, in the 2022 T20 Blast, Green took his first five-wicket haul in Twenty20 cricket, with 5/29 against Glamorgan.

Green struck 157 against Durham, in the Royal London Cup on 10 August 2022. His innings included 12 sixes and 10 fours. His maiden hundred in the competition came from 58 deliveries (of which the second 50 was hit from just 14 deliveries). His team still lost the game.

On 18 April 2024, Green joined Leicestershire on a short-term loan deal. In August 2024, Green returned to Leicestershire for a third loan spell for their remaining County Championship fixtures. In March 2025, he rejoined Leicestershire on loan once again for the first seven matches of that year's County Championship season, his loan deal was extended for a further two matches. In August 2025, he signed a two year deal with the club.

== Personal life ==
Green attended Exeter School.
