= Justin Broad =

German cricketer (born 2000)

Personal information
- Full name: Justin Broad
- Born: 30 June 2000 (age 26); Cape Town, Western Cape, South Africa
- Batting: Right-handed
- Bowling: Right-arm medium
- Role: Bowler

International information
- National side: Germany
- T20I debut (cap 31): 18 February 2022 v Bahrain
- Last T20I: 6 November 2022 v Spain

Domestic team information
- Years: Team
- 2023–2026: Northamptonshire (squad no. 75)

Career statistics
Competition	T20I	FC	LA	T20
Matches	9	30	17	39
Runs scored	288	1,135	343	960
Batting average	41.14	27.02	31.18	33.10
100s/50s	0/3	2/3	0/2	0/6
Top score	62	171	63	67
Balls bowled	69	2,536	457	183
Wickets	1	48	15	7
Bowling average	93.00	34.41	28.53	37.57
5 wickets in innings	0	1	0	0
10 wickets in match	0	0	0	0
Best bowling	1/9	7/33	3/16	2/11
Catches/stumpings	4/–	35/–	4/–	13/–
- Source: ESPNcricinfo, 17 July 2026

Justin Broad (born 30 June 2000) is a South African-born cricketer who plays for the Germany national team. Born in Cape Town, Broad excelled in school cricket and was selected to play for Western Province in national under-15s and under-17s tournaments. In 2019, Broad moved to England to play club cricket for Bury St Edmunds Cricket Club in the East Anglian Premier Cricket League, finishing as the club's top-scorer in his first season. Broad also represented the Marylebone Cricket Club Young Cricketers, and later joined Esher Cricket Club in 2021 to play in the Surrey Championship. He has also played for the second XI at Surrey County Cricket Club.

In February 2022, he was named in Germany's Twenty20 International (T20I) squad for the 2022 ICC Men's T20 World Cup Global Qualifier A. Broad made his T20I debut on 18 February 2022, for Germany against Bahrain. In his second T20I the following day, he top-scored for Germany with a half century against the United Arab Emirates.

In June 2023, Broad signed his first professional contract with Northamptonshire, after impressing while playing for the county's second team. He played his first game against Lancashire in the 2023 T20 Blast on 16 June 2023, taking the wicket of New Zealand international Daryl Mitchell and scoring 14 runs in the Northamptonshire innings. He made his first-class debut for Northamptonshire on 10 July 2023 in a County Championship division one match against Middlesex.

Broad made his maiden first-class century for Northamptonshire against Kent at the Spitfire Ground on 1 July 2025.

In August 2026, he agreed a contract extension with Northamptonshire tying him into the club until at least the end of the 2030 season.
