= Sol Budinger =

English cricketer (born 1999)

Personal information
- Full name: Solomon George Budinger
- Born: 21 August 1999 (age 27); Colchester, Essex, England
- Batting: Left-handed
- Bowling: Right-arm off break
- Role: Batsman

Domestic team information
- Years: Team
- 2021–2022: Nottinghamshire (squad no. 1)
- 2022: → Leicestershire (on loan)
- 2022: Birmingham Phoenix
- 2023–present: Leicestershire (squad no. 1)
- FC debut: 12 September 2022 Leicestershire v Durham
- LA debut: 25 July 2021 Nottinghamshire v Warwickshire

Career statistics
Competition	FC	LA	T20
Matches	34	45	42
Runs scored	1,606	1,626	717
Batting average	27.22	36.95	18.86
100s/50s	1/9	3/11	0/4
Top score	118	120	56
Balls bowled	165	38	24
Wickets	1	0	2
Bowling average	86.00	–	10.50
5 wickets in innings	0	–	0
10 wickets in match	0	–	0
Best bowling	1/13	–	2/21
Catches/stumpings	21/–	13/–	13/–
- Source: Cricinfo, 26 September 2026

Solomon George Budinger (born 21 August 1999) is an English cricketer. He made his Twenty20 debut on 18 June 2021, for Nottinghamshire in the 2021 T20 Blast. He made his List A debut on 25 July 2021, for Nottinghamshire in the 2021 Royal London One-Day Cup. Budinger moved to Leicestershire in September 2022 on a two-year contract. He signed a one-year extension at the end of the 2024 season and a further two-year deal in November 2025.

Sol Budinger plays his club cricket in the Nottinghamshire Premier League for Mansfield Hosiery Mills after being signed by Chairman, Craig Gould during the 2025 season.
