= Glamorgan County Cricket Club in 2026 =

Glamorgan County Cricket Club
2026 season
- Coach: (England) Richard Dawson (Wales) David Harrison (One-Day Cup)
- Captain: (Wales) Kiran Carlson (England) Andy Gorvin (One-Day Cup)
- Overseas player: (South Africa) Colin Ingram (Australia) Ryan Hadley (3 April – 18 May) (Australia) Nathan McAndrew (22 May – 12 July) (Afghanistan) Fazalhaq Farooqi (T20 Blast) (New Zealand) James Neesham (T20 Blast) (New Zealand) Raymond Toole (20 August – 27 September) (Pakistan) Mir Hamza (27 August – 27 September)
- Ground(s): Sophia Gardens, Cardiff; The Gnoll, Neath
- County Championship: 6th, Division One
- One-Day Cup: 8th, Group B
- T20 Blast: 5th, Central/West
- Most runs: FC: Kiran Carlson (942); LA: Alex Horton (334); T20: Kiran Carlson (405)
- Most wickets: FC: Timm van der Gugten (43); LA: Dan Douthwaite (17); T20: Mason Crane (15); Nathan McAndrew (15)
- Most catches: FC: Asa Tribe (23); LA: Jack Hope-Bell (5); T20: Will Smale (8)
- Most wicket-keeping dismissals: FC: Chris Cooke (32 ct + 3 st); LA: Alex Horton (6 ct + 2 st); T20: Chris Cooke (7 ct + 1 st)

The 2026 season was Glamorgan County Cricket Club's 139th year in existence and their 106th as a first-class cricket county. They played in Division One of the County Championship for the first time since 2005, having finished second in Division Two in 2025. They also played in the newly formed Central Group of the T20 Blast, and in Group B of the One-Day Cup. They began their One-Day Cup campaign with two matches at The Gnoll in Neath, their only outground for the season, the fifth year in a row they have played there.

It was the team's second and final season under head coach Richard Dawson; after initially signing a one-year contract in January 2025, he agreed a three-year extension that August. They also signed former Australia all-rounder Ian Harvey as an assistant coach on a full-time basis; Harvey had worked part-time with Glamorgan in 2025, and had also worked under Dawson during their time at Gloucestershire. Following the departure of Sam Northeast to his home county of Kent, Kiran Carlson was appointed as club captain, adding the red-ball duties to the white-ball captaincy he first held in 2021. With Dawson and Carlson involved in The Hundred, Glamorgan were coached by David Harrison in the One-Day Cup, and captained by Andy Gorvin.

South African Colin Ingram returned as one of the team's overseas players, along with Australian bowler Ryan Hadley, who joined for the first six games of the County Championship season. After Hadley's departure, fellow Australian Nathan McAndrew joined the team for the T20 Blast campaign and the two County Championship matches in June. Also joining for the T20 Blast was fast bowler Fazalhaq Farooqi, the first Afghanistan player to play for Glamorgan; however, Farooqi was recalled by the Afghanistan Cricket Board after the first two games of the Blast, leading to Glamorgan signing New Zealand international James Neesham for the remainder of the campaign. The Welsh county also added to their batting ranks with the signing of South Africa-born Sean Dickson, although he did not count against their overseas quota due to his UK passport. On 19 August, Glamorgan made a double-signing of left-arm seamers Raymond Toole and Mir Hamza; Toole was available for the final six County Championship games, while Hamza joined a week later.

In addition to Northeast, other major departures were batter Tom Bevan, who was released at the end of the 2025 season, and bowling all-rounder James Harris, who retired from professional cricket a week before the start of the Championship season. In August 2026, Chris Cooke announced that he would be retiring from professional cricket at the end of the season. Before the final match, Colin Ingram and Billy Root joined Cooke in announcing their retirement from professional cricket, with Ingram moving into a coaching role with Glamorgan.

At the end of the season, spinner Mason Crane was called up to the England squad for the 2026–27 Pakistan ODI Tri-Series, making him the first Glamorgan player called up to an England squad since Simon Jones in 2005. In October 2026, head coach Dawson agreed to become the assistant coach of the England Test side, bringing to an end a successful two-year spell at Glamorgan.

== Squad ==
- No. denotes the player's squad number, as worn on the back of their shirt.
- ‡ denotes players with international caps.
- * denotes a player who has been awarded a county cap.
- Ages given as of the first day of the County Championship season, 3 April 2026.

No.	Name	Nationality	Birth date	Batting style	Bowling style	Notes
Batters
5	Kiran Carlson*	Wales	16 May 1998 (aged 27)	Right-handed	Right arm off break	Club captain
7	Billy Root*	England	5 August 1992 (aged 33)	Left-handed	Right arm off break	
17	Callum Nicholls	Wales	30 July 2004 (aged 21)	Right-handed	Right arm medium	
23	Jack Hope-Bell	Wales	13 July 2007 (aged 18)	Right-handed	Right arm off break	
41	Colin Ingram*‡	South Africa	3 July 1985 (aged 40)	Left-handed	Right arm leg break	Overseas player
55	Asa Tribe‡	Jersey/England	29 March 2004 (aged 22)	Right-handed	Right arm off break	
58	Sean Dickson	South Africa/England	2 September 1991 (aged 34)	Right-handed	Right arm medium	
81	Harry Wallace	Wales	30 October 2008 (aged 17)	Left-handed	—	
97	Eddie Byrom	Zimbabwe/Ireland	17 June 1997 (aged 28)	Left-handed	Right arm off break	
—	Lewis Popple	Wales	19 October 2007 (aged 18)	Right-handed	—	
All-rounders
8	Ben Kellaway	Wales	5 January 2004 (aged 22)	Right-handed	Right arm off break/left arm orthodox	
27	Zain-ul-Hassan	England	28 October 2000 (aged 25)	Left-handed	Right arm medium	
50	James Neesham‡	New Zealand	17 September 1990 (aged 35)	Left-handed	Right arm medium-fast	Overseas player (T20 only)
88	Dan Douthwaite	England	8 February 1997 (aged 29)	Right-handed	Right arm medium-fast	
Wicket-keepers
6	Henry Hurle	Wales	11 November 2004 (aged 21)	Right-handed	Right arm off break	
28	Will Smale	Wales	28 February 2001 (aged 25)	Right-handed	—	
37	Alex Horton	Wales	7 January 2004 (aged 22)	Right-handed	—	
46	Chris Cooke*	South Africa	30 May 1986 (aged 39)	Right-handed	Right arm medium	
Bowlers
0	Nathan McAndrew	Australia	14 July 1993 (aged 32)	Right-handed	Right arm fast-medium	Overseas player
3	Mason Crane‡	England	18 February 1997 (aged 29)	Right-handed	Right arm leg break	
11	Andy Gorvin	England	14 May 1997 (aged 28)	Right-handed	Right arm medium	One-Day Cup captain
12	Tom Norton	Wales	8 August 2007 (aged 18)	Right-handed	Right arm medium	
16	Connor O'Riordan	Australia	16 April 2002 (aged 23)	Left-handed	Right arm medium-fast	
18	Ben Morris	Wales	4 November 2003 (aged 22)	Right-handed	Right arm medium	
22	Ned Leonard	England	15 August 2002 (aged 23)	Right-handed	Right arm medium	
24	Tom Edwards	Wales	7 November 2008 (aged 17)	Right-handed	Right arm medium	
26	Raymond Toole	New Zealand	30 October 1997 (aged 28)	Left-handed	Left arm medium	Overseas player
34	Ryan Hadley	Australia	17 November 1998 (aged 27)	Right-handed	Right arm fast-medium	Overseas player
35	Jamie McIlroy	Wales	19 June 1994 (aged 31)	Right-handed	Left arm fast-medium	
64	Timm van der Gugten*‡	Netherlands/Australia	25 February 1991 (aged 35)	Right-handed	Right arm medium-fast	
77	Romano Franco	Wales	16 March 2007 (aged 19)	Left-handed	Left arm orthodox	
83	Fazalhaq Farooqi‡	Afghanistan	22 September 2000 (aged 25)	Right-handed	Left arm fast	Overseas player (T20 only)
92	Mir Hamza‡	Pakistan	10 September 1992 (aged 33)	Left-handed	Left arm medium	Overseas player

== Pre-season and friendlies ==
Glamorgan were scheduled to go on a pre-season tour to Oman in March, where they would play games against Worcestershire and the Oman national team; however, this tour was cancelled after the commencement of the 2026 Iran war. With the cancellation of the tour, their pre-season consisted of just one three-day match against Somerset at Taunton on 27–29 March.

=== Three-day: Somerset v Glamorgan (27–29 March) ===
27–29 March 2025
Report
Scorecard

Somerset	v	Glamorgan
223 (60.5 overs); Jack Leach 47 (55); Ben Kellaway 2/11 (3.5 overs)		369/7d (87.1 overs); Ben Kellaway 106 (119); Josh Thomas 1/20 (7 overs)
331/7 (75 overs); Tom Lammonby 118* (131); Mason Crane 3/84 (15 overs)

Match drawn
County Ground, Taunton
Umpires: Mike Burns and Sam Hollingshead

- No toss.
- 14 players per side (11 fielding).

== County Championship ==
Glamorgan are competing in Division One of the 2026 County Championship, their first season in the top division since 2005.

=== Matches ===
==== Glamorgan v Yorkshire (3–6 April) ====
3–6 April 2026
Scorecard

Glamorgan	v	Yorkshire
302 (120.3 overs); Colin Ingram 103 (226); Jack White 3/40 (20 overs)		226 (60.2 overs); Matt Revis 50 (79); Mason Crane 5/55 (16.2 overs)
218/5d (72.5 overs); Colin Ingram 75 (136); Dom Bess 4/87 (30.5 overs)		239/7 (67.4 overs); Adam Lyth 97 (150); Ryan Hadley 3/35 (14.4 overs)

Match drawn
Sophia Gardens, Cardiff
Umpires: Nigel Llong and Russell Warren

- Yorkshire won the toss and elected to field.
- Play on day 1 was reduced to 36 overs due to rain.
- Jonny Bairstow (Yorks) suffered an injury while fielding in the Glamorgan first innings at the end of day 1, and missed the entirety of day 2 before being substituted by Will Luxton at the start of day 3.
- Points: Glamorgan 12, Yorkshire 10.

Glamorgan's return to top-flight cricket was delayed by inclement weather in Cardiff, with the first day's play not starting until after 4 p.m. The home side were soon reduced to 28/4 after being put in to bat, but 40-year-old Colin Ingram and 22-year-old Ben Kellaway put up stubborn resistance to get them to 99/4 by the close of play. Shortly before the end of the day, Yorkshire wicket-keeper Jonny Bairstow suffered a hand injury that resulted in him being substituted by Will Luxton. On day 2, Kellaway managed a half-century before he was bowled by Dom Bess, leaving Chris Cooke (30) and then Timm van der Gugten to accompany Ingram on the way to his maiden top-flight century. After Ingram was removed by Ben Coad, Van der Gugten (40) and Mason Crane combined for Glamorgan's third 50+ partnership of the innings. By the time Crane was dismissed by Bess for 51, Glamorgan had reached 302.

After only 10 more balls were possible at the end of the second day, Yorkshire's response began in earnest the following morning; however, they had just 11 runs on the board before Glamorgan took their first Division 1 wicket of the season, Finlay Bean edging a delivery from Van der Gugten to wicket-keeper Cooke for 4. Adam Lyth and Sam Whiteman looked to stabilise the Yorkshire innings, but a quickfire pair of wickets from spinner Crane, and then another a few overs later, saw the visitors reduced to 113/4, with Whiteman gone just shy of a half-century. Lyth was next to go, removed by Glamorgan debutant Ryan Hadley for 37, before Crane struck again to take the wicket of George Hill (2). Van der Gugten trapped Bess lbw for 32 to break up a promising partnership between him and Matt Revis, leaving Yorkshire at 177/7. Hadley then picked up another two wickets, getting rid of Logan van Beek and, shortly after his half-century, Revis, before Crane wrapped up a five-wicket haul with the scalp of Coad.

With a lead of 76 runs and 45 overs left to bowl on day 3, Glamorgan managed to add another 111 runs before the close of play, but not before they lost three wickets; Eddie Byrom (40) and captain Kiran Carlson were the main protagonists, but Asa Tribe (19) and debutant Sean Dickson (2) fell to the spin bowling of Bess before Byrom himself was removed by Van Beek. Joined by Ingram, Carlson reached 32 by the end of the day, and completed a half-century shortly after the start of day 4; however, the accelerated run rate saw him bowled by Bess not long after. Ingram joined him with a second fifty of the match, again supported by Kellaway from the other end, and when Ingram became Bess' fourth victim of the innings, caught by Revis for 75, Glamorgan decided to declare at 218/5, a lead of 294.

That gave Yorkshire 68 overs to reach their target, and they managed to put on 67 runs before losing their first wicket to the bowling of Crane, who trapped Bean lbw for 23. Another 50+ partnership followed before Crane tempted Whiteman (24) into a chipped catch to Kellaway with the second ball after tea, and Crane picked up a third soon after, bowling Wharton for 10. Ryan Hadley trapped Luxton lbw with Yorkshire on 162, before Kellaway effectively ended their run chase as Lyth edged him behind just three runs short of a century. The visitors still needed 118 more runs as they entered the last 20 overs, forcing them to play for the draw as Glamorgan removed Revis and Bess before the game petered out.

==== Nottinghamshire v Glamorgan (10–13 April) ====
10–13 April 2026
Scorecard

Nottinghamshire	v	Glamorgan
279 (63.4 overs); Jack Haynes 100 (137); Timm van der Gugten 4/54 (18 overs)		113 (48 overs); Zain-ul-Hassan 27 (57); Fergus O'Neill 4/24 (13 overs)
311/9d (86 overs); Joe Clarke 136 (195); Andy Gorvin 3/55 (16 overs)		285 (96.5 overs); Asa Tribe 85 (104); Liam Patterson-White 3/13 (12.5 overs)

Nottinghamshire won by 192 runs
Trent Bridge, Nottingham
Umpires: Richard Illingworth and Rob White

- Glamorgan won the toss and elected to field.
- Play on day 3 was reduced to 42 overs due to rain and bad light.
- Points: Nottinghamshire 20, Glamorgan 3.

==== Glamorgan v Leicestershire (24–27 April) ====
24–27 April 2026
Scorecard

Glamorgan	v	Leicestershire
440 (142 overs); Mason Crane 99 (213); Ian Holland 2/33 (23 overs)		585/7d (169 overs); Jonny Tattersall 112 (200); Andy Gorvin 2/89 (30 overs)
137/2 (52 overs); Asa Tribe 67* (140); Josh Davey 1/12 (6 overs)

Match drawn
Sophia Gardens, Cardiff
Umpires: Ian Blackwell and Steve O'Shaughnessy

- Glamorgan won the toss and elected to bat.
- Points: Leicestershire 14, Glamorgan 12.

==== Hampshire v Glamorgan (1–4 May) ====
1–4 May 2026
Scorecard

Glamorgan	v	Hampshire
537/7d (132 overs); Kiran Carlson 209 (232); Tom Prest 2/37 (7 overs)		214 (73.1 overs); Ben Mayes 59 (104); Timm van der Gugten 4/53 (19 overs)
		253 (92.5 overs) (f/o); Ben Brown 96 (145); Mason Crane 3/48 (24 overs)

Glamorgan won by an innings and 69 runs
Rose Bowl, Southampton
Umpires: Ben Debenham and Mark Newell

- Hampshire won the toss and elected to field.
- Play on day 2 was limited to 52 overs due to rain.
- Points: Glamorgan 23, Hampshire 1.

==== Glamorgan v Somerset (8–11 May) ====
8–11 May 2026
Scorecard

Somerset	v	Glamorgan
354 (102.5 overs); Tom Abell 86 (152); Tom Norton 3/75 (19 overs)		229 (71.1 overs); Ben Kellaway 59 (101); Migael Pretorius 3/50 (12 overs)
157 (50.2 overs); Tom Abell 71 (128); Tom Norton 4/61 (16 overs)		285/8 (122.2 overs); Sean Dickson 76 (154); Migael Pretorius 4/74 (34 overs)

Glamorgan won by 2 wickets
Sophia Gardens, Cardiff
Umpires: Mark Newell and Paul Pollard

- Glamorgan won the toss and elected to field.
- Tom Norton (Glam) made his first-class debut.
- Tom Norton (Glam) became the youngest player to take a hat-trick on his first-class debut.
- Points: Glamorgan 19, Somerset 6.

==== Warwickshire v Glamorgan (15–18 May) ====
15–18 May 2026
Scorecard

Glamorgan	v	Warwickshire
360 (101.1 overs); Ben Kellaway 139 (242); Oliver Hannon-Dalby 5/53 (20.1 overs)		252 (63.5 overs); Jordan Thompson 57 (61); Tom Norton 4/48 (13.5 overs)
259 (78.4 overs); Colin Ingram 101 (159); Ethan Bamber 5/48 (20 overs)		100/2 (29 overs); Alex Davies 46 (66); Ryan Hadley 1/10 (4 overs)

Match drawn
Edgbaston Cricket Ground, Birmingham
Umpires: Ian Blackwell and Rob White

- Warwickshire won the toss and elected to field.
- Play on day 2 was reduced to 49 overs due to rain.
- Play on day 4 was reduced to 48 overs due to rain.
- Points: Glamorgan 14, Warwickshire 12.

==== Sussex v Glamorgan (12–15 June) ====
12–15 June 2026
Scorecard

Glamorgan	v	Sussex
155 (51.2 overs); Ben Kellaway 33 (63); Jaydev Unadkat 4/29 (14.2 overs)		521 (125.1 overs); James Coles 224* (226); Tom Norton 3/119 (22 overs)
268 (99.3 overs); Asa Tribe 64 (126); Tom Haines 3/5 (9 overs)

Sussex won by an innings and 98 runs
County Cricket Ground, Hove
Umpires: Ian Blackwell and Nigel Llong

- Sussex won the toss and elected to field.
- Points: Sussex 23, Glamorgan 2.

==== Glamorgan v Surrey (19–22 June) ====
19–22 June 2026
Scorecard

Glamorgan	v	Surrey
358 (114.1 overs); Mason Crane 106 (234); Gus Atkinson 4/61 (22.1 overs)		105 (34.4 overs); Adam Thomas 25 (46); Tom Norton 5/50 (10 overs)
197/3 (45.1 overs); Kiran Carlson 67 (94); Rahul Chahar 2/57 (11.1 overs)		447 (f/o) (142.5 overs); Rory Burns 115 (258); Ryan Hadley 4/82 (20.5 overs)

Glamorgan won by 7 wickets
Sophia Gardens, Cardiff
Umpires: Rob White and Ulhas Gandhe

- Glamorgan won the toss and elected to bat.
- Play on day 1 was reduced to 80 overs due to bad light.
- Colin Ingram (Glam) retired hurt on 23* from 78/5 to 244/7 of the first innings.
- Gus Atkinson (Surr) was withdrawn from the game by the ECB at the end of day 2; he was replaced by Tom Lawes.
- Points: Glamorgan 22, Surrey 2.

==== Leicestershire v Glamorgan (20–23 August) ====
20–23 August 2026
Scorecard

Leicestershire	v	Glamorgan
151 (62.5 overs); Ian Holland 23 (61); Raymond Toole 3/48 (18.5 overs)		152 (53.1 overs); Mason Crane 44 (110); Ian Holland 4/30 (13.1 overs)
257 (74.2 overs); Sheridon Gumbs 93 (152); Zain-ul-Hassan 3/46 (14 overs)		214 (86 overs); Kiran Carlson 99 (188); Ian Holland 5/19 (24 overs)

Leicestershire won by 42 runs
Grace Road, Leicester
Umpires: Ben Debenham and Mike Burns

- Glamorgan won the toss and elected to field.
- Play on day 1 was reduced to 47 overs due to rain.
- Points: Leicestershire 19, Glamorgan 3.

==== Glamorgan v Hampshire (27–30 August) ====
27–30 August 2026
Scorecard

Hampshire	v	Glamorgan
162 (40.2 overs); Jake Lehmann 51* (59); Zain-ul-Hassan 3/33 (11 overs)		161 (60 overs); Ben Kellaway 57 (92); Sonny Baker 4/34 (11 overs)
300/8d (69.3 overs); Toby Albert 64 (130); Ben Kellaway 4/78 (15 overs)		21/3 (13.5 overs); Ben Kellaway 8* (28); Kyle Abbott 2/7 (7 overs)

Match drawn
Sophia Gardens, Cardiff
Umpires: James Middlebrook and Surendiran Shanmugam

- Glamorgan won the toss and elected to field.
- Play on day 1 was reduced to 79 overs due to rain.
- Play on day 2 was reduced to 19 overs due to rain.
- Play on day 3 was reduced to 43 overs due to rain.
- Play on day 4 was reduced to 44 overs due to rain.
- Sonny Baker replaced Scott Currie in the Hampshire team after 32 overs of Glamorgan's first innings after Baker was released from the England squad for the 2nd Test against Pakistan.
- Points: Glamorgan 11, Hampshire 11.

==== Somerset v Glamorgan (2–4 September) ====
2–4 September 2026
Scorecard

Glamorgan	v	Somerset
194 (59.2 overs); Ben Kellaway 51 (82); Migael Pretorius 3/45 (16 overs)		441 (109.1 overs); Tom Lammonby 95 (173); Mason Crane 4/95 (23.1 overs)
183 (59 overs); Asa Tribe 49 (108); Craig Overton 3/29 (13 overs)

Somerset won by an innings and 64 runs
County Ground, Taunton
Umpires: Michael Gough and Nigel Llong

- Somerset won the toss and elected to field.
- Play on day 1 was reduced to 83 overs due to rain.
- Connor O'Riordan (Glam) made his first-class debut.
- Points: Somerset 23, Glamorgan 3.

==== Glamorgan v Warwickshire (8–11 September) ====
8–11 September 2026
Scorecard

Glamorgan	v	Warwickshire
69 (26.3 overs); Colin Ingram 19 (19); Ethan Bamber 5/28 (8 overs)		391 (97.5 overs); Sam Hain 76 (149); Ben Kellaway 3/79 (19 overs)
65 (26.1 overs); Asa Tribe 27 (56); Ed Barnard 4/13 (6 overs)

Warwickshire won by an innings and 257 runs
Sophia Gardens, Cardiff
Umpires: Graham Lloyd and Tom Lungley

- Glamorgan won the toss and elected to bat.
- Play on day 1 was reduced to 67 overs due to rain.
- Jack Hope-Bell (Glam) made his first-class debut.
- Points: Warwickshire 22, Glamorgan 3.

==== Surrey v Glamorgan (15–18 September) ====
15–18 September 2026
Scorecard

Glamorgan	v	Surrey
132 (45.5 overs); Jack Hope-Bell 33 (45); Auqib Nabi 4/36 (10 overs)		115 (33 overs); Ryan Patel 26 (37); Zain-ul-Hassan 4/26 (8 overs)
594 (162.2 overs); Asa Tribe 155 (337); Adam Thomas 2/74 (15.2 overs)		427 (108.2 overs); Ryan Patel 132 (213); Zain-ul-Hassan 2/67 (19 overs)

Glamorgan won by 184 runs
The Oval, London
Umpires: Ben Debenham and Ian Blackwell

- Surrey won the toss and elected to field.
- Play on day 1 was reduced to 89 runs due to rain and bad light.
- Matthew Fisher (Surrey) suffered a groin injury while bowling in Glamorgan's first innings and was substituted by James Taylor after 24 overs of Surrey's first innings.
- Points: Glamorgan 19, Surrey 3.

The first day of the match saw Glamorgan bowled out for just 132 runs, with a top score of 33 from 19-year-old Jack Hope-Bell, losing their last six wickets for just 23 runs; however, they responded well by bowling Surrey out for 115, Zain-ul-Hassan leading the bowling with 4/26 in just eight overs. With a first-innings lead of 17, Glamorgan saw off 9.2 overs without losing a wicket before a premature close of play brought about by bad light.

Glamorgan batted through the second day led by opener Asa Tribe, who reached an unbeaten 142 before the close of play – his fifth first-class century – assisted by 57 from Kiran Carlson and 43 from Ben Kellaway. They added 309 runs over the course of the day for the loss of just five wickets, putting them in the driving seat to claim the win that would secure top-flight survival.

Tribe was eventually dismissed for 155 early on the third day, but the arrival of Timm van der Gugten at the crease kicked off the biggest partnership of the match so far, as he and Mason Crane put on 129 for the eighth wicket. Van der Gugten was run out for 72, but Crane remained and eventually reached his second County Championship century of the season (and his career), finishing unbeaten on 114 after a stand of 98 off 80 balls with Mir Hamza to give Glamorgan a lead of 611. They made early inroads into the Surrey line-up before the close of play, removing Rory Burns and Dom Sibley, but Ryan Patel and Ollie Pope recovered to get them to 177/2, needing 435 runs on the final day for victory.

Pope and Patel combined for 168 runs before Pope was eventually dismissed for 75 by Zain-ul-Hassan, but Dan Lawrence held up an end to see Patel through to a score of 132 before he was removed by Mir Hamza. With four wickets down, Surrey were still 321 short of their target, and the removal of Lawrence and Adam Thomas further worsened their cause. Ben Foakes and Tom Lawes provided some resistance with a partnership of 49, but Lawes was the only one to cause the scorers much bother, reaching 45 before Crane trapped him lbw. The last three wickets fell for just 30 runs, giving Glamorgan a 184-run victory to confirm their place in Division 1 for 2027.

==== Glamorgan v Essex (24–27 September) ====
24–27 September 2026
Scorecard

Glamorgan	v	Essex
505 (157.1 overs); Asa Tribe 184 (383); Zaman Akhter 5/107 (23.1 overs)		129 (45.1 overs); Simon Harmer 35 (51); Zain-ul-Hassan 5/14 (8.1 overs)
		351/6 (f/o) (85.3 overs); Dean Elgar 108 (181); Mason Crane 2/58 (14 overs)

Match drawn
Sophia Gardens, Cardiff
Umpires: Alex Wharf and Mike Burns

- Essex won the toss and elected to field.
- Play on day 4 was reduced to 4 overs due to rain.
- Points: Glamorgan 13, Essex 9.

=== Standings ===
Pos	Team	Pld	W	L	T	D	A	Bat	Bowl	Ded	Pts	
1	Warwickshire	14	7	1	0	6	0	24	41	0	225	Champions
2	Somerset	14	6	3	0	5	0	28	41	0	205	
3	Sussex	14	7	3	0	4	0	27	36	12	195	
4	Nottinghamshire	14	5	3	0	6	0	25	39	0	192	
5	Yorkshire	14	6	4	0	4	0	16	36	0	180	
6	Glamorgan	14	4	5	0	5	0	16	39	0	159	
7	Surrey	14	2	4	0	8	0	23	33	0	152	
8	Essex	14	4	7	0	3	0	13	35	0	136	
9	Leicestershire	14	3	7	0	4	0	20	38	27	111	Relegation to Division 2
10	Hampshire	14	2	9	0	3	0	4	38	0	98	Relegation to Division 2

Source: ESPNcricinfo, ECB, BBC

== One-Day Cup ==
=== Matches ===
==== Glamorgan v Sussex (22 July) ====
22 July 2026
Scorecard

Sussex; 295/8 (50 overs)	v	Glamorgan; 283/8 (50 overs)
Jack Hope-Bell 123 (118); Fynn Hudson-Prentice 5/62 (10 overs)		Jack Carson 81 (72); Dan Douthwaite 4/54 (10 overs)

Glamorgan won by 12 runs
The Gnoll, Neath
Umpires: Anthony Harris and Mike Burns

- Sussex won the toss and elected to field.
- Callum Nicholls, Jack Hope-Bell (both Glam), Robert Kirtley and Toby Munt (both Sssx) made their List A debuts.

==== Glamorgan v Yorkshire (24 July) ====
24 July 2026
Scorecard

Glamorgan; 186 (47 overs)	v	Yorkshire; 190/8 (48.4 overs)
Eddie Byrom 68 (95); Ben Cliff 4/29 (8 overs)		Finlay Bean 43* (52); Jamie McIlroy 2/23 (9.4 overs)

Yorkshire won by 2 wickets
The Gnoll, Neath
Umpires: Bilal Shafayat and James Tredwell

- Glamorgan won the toss and elected to bat.
- Points: Yorkshire 4, Glamorgan 0.

==== Middlesex v Glamorgan (26 July) ====
26 July 2026
Scorecard

Glamorgan; 66 (20.5 overs)	v	Middlesex; 67/2 (9.1 overs)
Eddie Byrom 29 (34); Naavya Sharma 4/29 (7)		Josh de Caires 45* (30); Tom Edwards 2/7 (3 overs)

Middlesex won by 8 wickets
Brunton Memorial Ground, Radlett
Umpires: Anthony Harris and Gareth Cross

- Middlesex won the toss and elected to field.
- Connor O'Riordan and Tom Edwards (both Glam) made their List A debuts.
- Points: Middlesex 4, Glamorgan 0.

==== Durham v Glamorgan (29 July) ====
29 July 2026
Scorecard

Glamorgan; 326/6 (50 overs)	v	Durham; 328/7 (49.3 overs)
Eddie Byrom 76 (74); Will Rhodes 2/31 (6 overs)		Will Rhodes 148* (122); Zain-ul-Hassan 2/55 (10 overs)

Durham won by 3 wickets
Roseworth Terrace, Gosforth
Umpires: Chris Watts and Neil Pratt

- Durham won the toss and elected to field.
- Points: Durham 4, Glamorgan 0.

==== Derbyshire v Glamorgan (31 July) ====
31 July 2026
Scorecard

Derbyshire; 315/5 (50 overs)	v	Glamorgan; 271 (47.3 overs)
Brooke Guest 108* (82); Dan Douthwaite 3/66 (10 overs)		Alex Horton 81 (57); Nick Potts 4/39 (8.3 overs)

Derbyshire won by 44 runs
Repton School Ground, Repton
Umpires: Mohammed Waseem and Paul Baldwin

- Glamorgan won the toss and elected to field.
- Points: Derbyshire 4, Glamorgan 0.

==== Hampshire v Glamorgan (5 August) ====
5 August 2026
Scorecard

Hampshire; 263 (49.3 overs)	v	Glamorgan; 173 (40.4 overs)
Jake Lehmann 68 (78); Dan Douthwaite 3/38 (9.3 overs)		Callum Nicholls 40 (52); Kyle Abbott 3/20 (7 overs)

Hampshire won by 90 runs
Rose Bowl, Southampton
Umpires: Casper Viljoen and Sue Redfern

- Hampshire won the toss and elected to bat.
- Harry Wallace (Glam) made his List A debut.
- Points: Hampshire 4, Glamorgan 0.

==== Glamorgan v Essex (7 August) ====
7 August 2026
Scorecard

Essex; 312 (47.1 overs)	v	Glamorgan; 309/7 (50 overs)
Luc Benkenstein 140 (109); Dan Douthwaite 3/57 (9 overs)		Timm van der Gugten 118* (101); Shane Snater 3/49 (10 overs)

Essex won by 3 runs
Sophia Gardens, Cardiff
Umpires: Jack Shantry and Mark Newell

- Glamorgan won the toss and elected to field.
- Timm van der Gugten (Glam) scored his maiden century in any format.
- Points: Essex 4, Glamorgan 0.

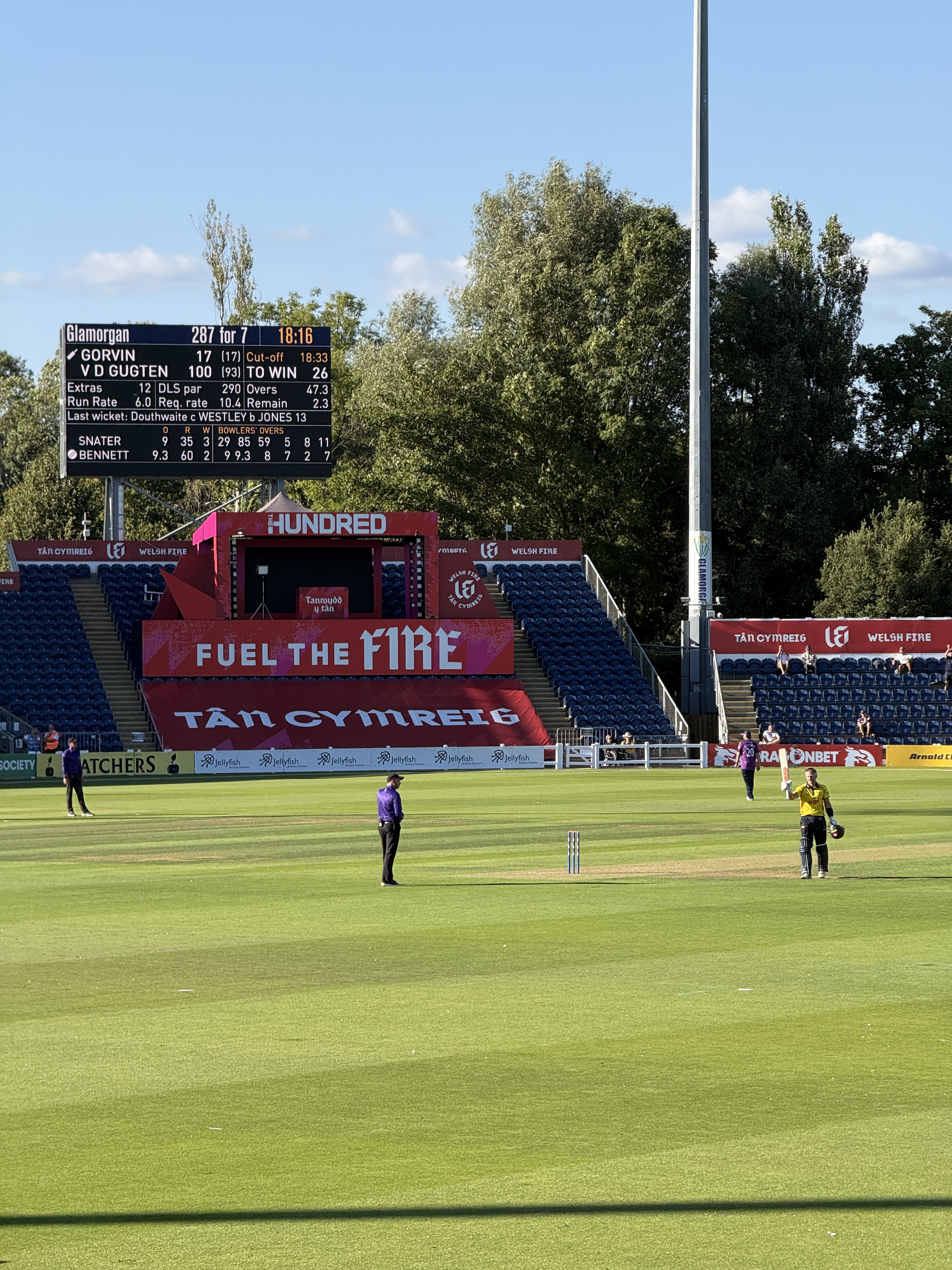
Glamorgan's Timm van der Gugten salutes the crowd after his maiden century in senior cricket against Essex on 7 August 2026.

After being put in to bat by Glamorgan, Essex wasted no time in putting on 166 runs for the first wicket at Sophia Gardens, only to lose Noah Thain for 76 just after the midway point of the innings. Captain Tom Westley went for 7 shortly afterwards, but 21-year-old opener Luc Benkenstein continued on to reach his century in just 94 balls. Essex passed 250 runs in the 36th over, but the loss of Matt Critchley (28) – run out by Zain-ul-Hassan after a mix-up with Benkenstein – sparked a batting collapse. Benkenstein was dismissed for 140 in the next over, followed by Grant Roelofsen (3) at the end of the 39th and Simon Fernandes (2) at the end of the 40th to bring Essex to 242/6 as the final powerplay began. They were eventually bowled out at the start of the 48th over, but not before adding a further 70 runs to give them a final total of 312, only Shane Snater (11) reaching double-figures out of the tailenders.

Glamorgan's response began badly, losing Eddie Byrom (1), Zain-ul-Hassan (13) and Colin Ingram (2) inside the opening powerplay, and then Jack Hope-Bell (5) five balls later to leave them at 49/4 at the end of the 11th over. 17-year-old batter Harry Wallace (39) was the only one of the top five to offer much resistance, but when his wicket went down at the start of the 18th over, Glamorgan found themselves at 78/5, needing more than 7 runs per over for victory. At the other end, Alex Horton had found the beginnings of an innings and in Timm van der Gugten he found a partner to get Glamorgan back into the game. Over the course of almost the next 20 overs, the pair put on 128 runs between them before Horton was caught out for 85 off 72, reducing the deficit to 107 with less than 14 overs to be bowled. Van der Gugten and Dan Douthwaite then added 39 runs for the seventh wicket before Douthwaite was dismissed for 13, bringing captain Andy Gorvin to the crease. Gorvin held up his end, but it was Van der Gugten who led the way in the partnership, reaching his maiden century in all senior cricket in just 93 balls before hitting a six off the final ball of the penultimate over to leave Glamorgan needing just six runs off the final over; however, Gorvin was unable to get off strike until the fourth ball of the over and Van der Gugten managed only a single off the final ball to give Essex the victory by three runs.

==== Glamorgan v Worcestershire (9 August) ====
9 August 2026
Scorecard

Worcestershire; 278/9 (50 overs)	v	Glamorgan; 281/8 (50 overs)
Jake Libby 105 (114); Zain-ul-Hassan 4/58 (10 overs)		Callum Nicholls 70 (91); Ben Allison 2/55 (10 overs)

Glamorgan won by 2 wickets
Sophia Gardens, Cardiff
Umpires: Ben Peverall and Gareth Cross

- Worcestershire won the toss and elected to bat.
- Points: Glamorgan 4, Worcestershire 0.

=== Standings ===
Pos	Team	Pld	W	L	T	NR	Ded	Pts	NRR
1	Middlesex	8	7	1	0	0	0	28	1.659
2	Yorkshire	8	6	2	0	0	0	24	0.778
3	Durham	8	5	3	0	0	0	20	0.089
4	Worcestershire Rapids	8	5	3	0	0	0	20	0.032
5	Hampshire	8	4	4	0	0	0	16	−0.083
6	Derbyshire Falcons	8	3	5	0	0	0	12	0.156
7	Essex	8	3	5	0	0	0	12	−0.203
8	Glamorgan	8	2	6	0	0	0	8	−0.930
9	Sussex Sharks	8	1	7	0	0	2	2	−1.517

Source: BBC Sport, ECB, Cricinfo
- Advanced directly to the semi-finals
- Advanced to the quarter-finals

== T20 Blast ==
=== Matches ===
==== Northamptonshire v Glamorgan (22 May) ====
22 May 2026 (D/N)
Scorecard

Northamptonshire; 165/8 (20 overs)	v	Glamorgan; 162/8 (20 overs)
Justin Broad 38 (25); Fazalhaq Farooqi 4/34 (4 overs)		Dan Douthwaite 51* (34); George Scrimshaw 3/33 (4 overs)

Northamptonshire won by 3 runs
County Cricket Ground, Northampton
Umpires: Chris Watts and Russell Warren

- Glamorgan won the toss and elected to field.
- Points: Northamptonshire 4, Glamorgan 0.

==== Glamorgan v Gloucestershire (23 May) ====
23 May 2026 (D/N)
Scorecard

Glamorgan; 157/8 (20 overs)	v	Gloucestershire; 158/8 (20 overs)
Henry Hurle 46 (31); Duan Jansen 3/27 (4 overs)		Miles Hammond 56 (31); Mason Crane 2/16 (4 overs)

Gloucestershire won by 2 wickets
Sophia Gardens, Cardiff
Umpires: Paul Pollard and Tom Lungley
Player of the match: Miles Hammond (Glos)

- Gloucestershire won the toss and elected to field.
- Henry Hurle (Glam) made his T20 debut.

==== Glamorgan v Somerset (29 May) ====
29 May 2026 (D/N)
Scorecard

Somerset; 171/9 (20 overs)	v	Glamorgan; 175/3 (13.5 overs)
Tom Banton 59 (25); Nathan McAndrew 4/15 (4 overs)		Kiran Carlson 109 (45); Joshua Thomas 1/14 (1 over)

Glamorgan won by 7 wickets
Sophia Gardens, Cardiff
Umpires: Anthony Harris and Surendiran Shanmugam

- Glamorgan won the toss and elected to field.
- Points: Glamorgan 4, Somerset 0.

==== Somerset v Glamorgan (4 June) ====
4 June 2026 (D/N)
Scorecard

Somerset; 202/6 (20 overs)	v	Glamorgan; 203/6 (20 overs)
Lewis Gregory 54 (28); Dan Douthwaite 2/35 (4 overs)		Sean Dickson 63 (36); Jake Ball 2/47 (4 overs)

Glamorgan won by 4 wickets
County Ground, Taunton
Umpires: Ian Blackwell and Jack Shantry
Player of the match: Sean Dickson (Glam)

- Glamorgan won the toss and elected to field.
- Points: Glamorgan 4, Somerset 0.

==== Worcestershire v Glamorgan (5 June) ====
5 June 2026 (D/N)
Scorecard

Worcestershire; 168/8 (20 overs)	v	Glamorgan; 141 (19.3 overs)
Adam Hose 50 (31); Andy Gorvin 3/34 (4 overs)		Kiran Carlson 35 (24); Sikandar Raza 4/17 (4 overs)

Worcestershire won by 27 runs
New Road, Worcester
Umpires: Ian Blackwell and Surendiran Shanmugam

- Glamorgan won the toss and elected to field.
- Points: Worcestershire 4, Glamorgan 0.

==== Lancashire v Glamorgan (7 June) ====
7 June 2026
Scorecard

Lancashire; 201/7 (20 overs)	v	Glamorgan; 202/8 (20 overs)
Liam Livingstone 81 (37); James Neesham 3/24 (4 overs)		Chris Cooke 44* (15); Liam Livingstone 3/13 (4 overs)

Glamorgan won by 2 wickets
Stanley Park, Blackpool
Umpires: Hassan Adnan and Steve O'Shaughnessy

- Glamorgan won the toss and elected to field.
- Points: Glamorgan 4, Lancashire 0.

==== Glamorgan v Middlesex (26 June) ====
26 June 2026 (D/N)
Scorecard

Middlesex; 153/7 (20 overs)	v	Glamorgan; 159/4 (17.3 overs)
Ben Geddes 38 (22); Mason Crane 4/24 (4 overs)		Sean Dickson 67* (34); Naavya Sharma 1/17 (2 overs)

Glamorgan won by 6 wickets
Sophia Gardens, Cardiff
Umpires: Nigel Llong and Russell Warren

- Glamorgan won the toss and elected to field.
- Points: Glamorgan 4, Middlesex 0.

==== Glamorgan v Warwickshire (3 July) ====
3 July 2026 (D/N)
Scorecard

Warwickshire; 184/4 (20 overs)	v	Glamorgan; 187/3 (18.5 overs)
Sam Hain 63* (46); Nathan McAndrew 1/29 (3 overs)		Will Smale 62 (50); Usman Tariq 2/13 (4 overs)

Glamorgan won by 7 wickets
Sophia Gardens, Cardiff
Umpires: Nigel Llong and Simon Widdup

- Glamorgan won the toss and elected to field.
- Points: Glamorgan 4, Warwickshire 0.

==== Glamorgan v Worcestershire (5 July) ====
5 July 2026
Scorecard

Worcestershire; 161/9 (20 overs)	v	Glamorgan; 146 (19.2 overs)
Gareth Roderick 71 (43); Ben Kellaway 3/24 (3 overs)		Ben Kellaway 43 (26); Fateh Singh 3/17 (3.2 overs)

Worcestershire won by 15 runs
Sophia Gardens, Cardiff
Umpires: Nigel Llong and Simon Widdup

- Worcestershire won the toss and elected to bat.
- Points: Worcestershire 4, Glamorgan 0.

==== Glamorgan v Northamptonshire (8 July) ====
8 July 2026 (D/N)
Scorecard

Northamptonshire; 217/7 (20 overs)	v	Glamorgan; 164 (18.3 overs)
Chris Lynn 117 (56); Ben Kellaway 3/22 (4 overs)		Kiran Carlson 42 (20); Calvin Harrison 3/20 (4 overs)

Northamptonshire won by 53 runs
Sophia Gardens, Cardiff
Umpires: Jack Shantry and Paul Baldwin

- Northamptonshire won the toss and elected to bat.
- Points: Northamptonshire 4, Glamorgan 0.

==== Warwickshire v Glamorgan (10 July) ====
10 July 2026 (D/N)
Scorecard

Glamorgan; 188/4 (20 overs)	v	Warwickshire; 191/6 (19.5 overs)
Will Smale 58 (36); Usman Tariq 2/26 (4 overs)		Rob Yates 72 (40); Ben Kellaway 3/35 (4 overs)

Warwickshire won by 4 wickets
Edgbaston Cricket Ground, Birmingham
Umpires: Anthony Harris and Hassan Adnan

- Glamorgan won the toss and elected to bat.
- Points: Warwickshire 4, Glamorgan 0.

==== Gloucestershire v Glamorgan (12 July) ====
12 July 2026
Scorecard

Glamorgan; 235/7 (20 overs)	v	Gloucestershire; 185 (19.1 overs)
Kiran Carlson 73 (40); D'Arcy Short 2/29 (3 overs)		Dawid Malan 39 (27); Ben Kellaway 2/31 (4 overs)

Glamorgan won by 50 runs
Bristol County Ground
Umpires: Ben Peverall and Nigel Llong

- Glamorgan won the toss and elected to bat.
- Points: Glamorgan 4, Gloucestershire 0.

=== Standings ===
Pos	Team	Pld	W	L	T	NR	Pts	NRR
1	Northamptonshire	12	9	3	0	0	36	0.936
2	Somerset	12	7	5	0	0	28	0.763
3	Gloucestershire	12	7	5	0	0	28	0.288
4	Warwickshire	12	6	6	0	0	24	0.367
5	Glamorgan	12	6	6	0	0	24	0.217
6	Worcestershire	12	6	6	0	0	24	−0.337

Source: Cricinfo, BBC Sport

Advance to the quarter-finals

== Statistics ==
=== Batting ===
First-class
Player	Matches	Innings	NO	Runs	HS	Ave	SR	100	50	0	4s	6s
Kiran Carlson	14	26	1	942	209	37.68	53.31	2	6	5	122	5
Asa Tribe	14	26	1	940	184	37.60	49.29	2	4	3	121	0
Colin Ingram	13	23	2	670	103	31.90	56.06	2	3	3	90	6
Ben Kellaway	13	21	2	642	139	33.78	51.11	1	5	2	88	2
Mason Crane	14	23	5	595	114*	33.05	49.87	2	2	2	67	3
Sean Dickson	12	21	2	491	90	25.84	51.68	0	3	2	64	2
Chris Cooke	14	22	1	427	101	20.33	42.48	1	0	0	43	4
Zain-ul-Hassan	10	17	0	381	143	22.41	37.53	1	0	5	48	1
Timm van der Gugten	14	22	3	371	72	19.52	43.90	0	2	6	47	2
Ryan Hadley	8	11	7	90	50*	22.50	23.80	0	1	1	9	2
Source: Cricinfo

List A
Player	Matches	Innings	NO	Runs	HS	Ave	SR	100	50	0	4s	6s
Alex Horton	8	8	0	334	122	41.75	106.03	1	2	2	32	13
Jack Hope-Bell	8	8	1	293	123	41.85	93.91	1	1	0	37	1
Eddie Byrom	8	8	0	217	76	27.12	83.14	0	2	0	32	2
Timm van der Gugten	4	4	2	187	118*	93.50	115.43	1	0	0	22	4
Zain-ul-Hassan	5	5	0	172	65	34.40	69.07	0	2	0	18	5
Callum Nicholls	7	7	0	170	70	24.28	76.57	0	1	2	13	5
Dan Douthwaite	8	8	1	142	45*	20.28	88.19	0	0	0	10	8
Andy Gorvin	8	7	3	86	25*	21.50	72.26	0	0	1	9	0
Harry Wallace	3	3	0	56	39	18.66	81.15	0	0	0	5	2
Will Smale	5	5	0	53	20	10.60	59.55	0	0	1	7	1
Source: Cricinfo

Twenty20
Player	Matches	Innings	NO	Runs	HS	Ave	SR	100	50	0	4s	6s
Kiran Carlson	12	12	0	405	109	33.75	195.65	1	1	1	43	23
Will Smale	12	12	0	342	62	28.50	138.46	0	3	1	36	14
Sean Dickson	12	12	4	336	67*	42.00	157.74	0	3	0	38	14
Ben Kellaway	12	12	0	249	47	20.75	142.28	0	0	1	22	9
Asa Tribe	7	7	1	151	48	25.16	131.30	0	0	1	14	2
Chris Cooke	11	7	1	118	44*	19.66	143.90	0	0	1	9	6
Nathan McAndrew	10	6	2	88	36	22.00	179.59	0	0	0	6	7
Dan Douthwaite	11	7	1	87	51*	14.50	124.28	0	1	0	4	6
James Neesham	10	8	4	85	27*	21.25	116.43	0	0	0	11	0
Timm van der Gugten	8	6	2	56	22	14.00	130.23	0	0	1	4	2
Source: Cricinfo

=== Bowling ===
First-class
Player	Matches	Innings	Overs	Maidens	Runs	Wickets	BBI	BBM	Ave	Econ	SR	5w	10w
Timm van der Gugten	14	24	433.1	105	1,213	43	4/53	7/118	28.20	2.80	60.44	0	0
Mason Crane	14	20	308.4	36	1,202	34	5/55	8/154	35.35	3.89	54.47	1	0
Zain-ul-Hassan	10	18	221.0	42	701	28	5/14	6/61	25.03	3.17	47.35	1	0
Ryan Hadley	8	14	201.3	25	754	27	4/76	6/97	27.92	3.74	44.77	0	0
Tom Norton	4	7	112.5	16	479	21	5/50	7/136	22.80	4.24	32.23	1	0
Ben Kellaway	13	16	177.2	15	626	20	4/78	4/78	31.30	3.53	53.20	0	0
Raymond Toole	3	6	93.2	22	284	11	3/21	5/93	25.81	3.04	50.90	0	0
Mir Hamza	4	6	88.2	10	324	11	3/39	4/81	29.45	3.66	48.18	0	0
Andy Gorvin	4	7	87.0	11	308	10	3/55	5/120	30.80	3.54	52.20	0	0
Kiran Carlson	14	8	64.1	5	192	5	2/100	2/100	38.40	2.99	77.00	0	0
Source: Cricinfo

List A
Player	Matches	Innings	Overs	Maidens	Runs	Wickets	BBI	Ave	Econ	SR	4w	5w
Dan Douthwaite	8	8	68.3	2	406	17	4/54	23.88	5.92	24.17	1	0
Zain-ul-Hassan	5	4	40.0	2	219	9	4/58	24.33	5.47	26.66	1	0
Tom Edwards	4	4	31.0	0	178	7	3/55	25.42	5.74	26.57	0	0
Timm van der Gugten	4	4	39.1	4	150	5	2/37	30.00	3.82	47.00	0	0
Andy Gorvin	8	8	58.3	1	354	5	2/45	70.80	6.05	70.20	0	0
Romano Franco	8	7	61.0	0	355	5	2/66	71.00	5.81	73.20	0	0
Jack Hope-Bell	8	4	20.0	0	127	3	2/43	42.33	6.35	40.00	0	0
Jamie McIlroy	2	2	19.4	1	77	2	2/23	38.50	3.91	59.00	0	0
Connor O'Riordan	3	3	16.1	0	143	2	2/67	71.50	8.84	48.50	0	0
Source: Cricinfo

Twenty20
Player	Matches	Innings	Overs	Maidens	Runs	Wickets	BBI	Ave	Econ	SR	4w	5w
Mason Crane	10	10	39.0	0	303	15	4/24	20.20	7.76	15.60	1	0
Nathan McAndrew	10	10	35.0	0	372	15	4/15	24.80	10.62	14.00	1	0
Ben Kellaway	12	12	38.0	0	279	14	3/22	19.92	7.34	16.28	0	0
Dan Douthwaite	11	11	39.0	0	363	13	2/25	27.92	9.30	18.00	0	0
James Neesham	10	10	26.0	0	258	7	3/24	36.85	9.92	22.28	0	0
Fazalhaq Farooqi	2	2	8.0	0	72	6	4/34	12.00	9.00	8.00	1	0
Andy Gorvin	4	4	13.0	0	105	4	3/34	26.25	8.07	19.50	0	0
Ned Leonard	4	4	14.0	0	141	4	2/36	35.25	10.07	21.00	0	0
Timm van der Gugten	8	8	24.0	0	220	3	1/15	73.33	9.16	48.00	0	0
Source: Cricinfo
