= Glamorgan County Cricket Club in 2024 =

Glamorgan County Cricket Club
2024 season
- Coach: (New Zealand) Grant Bradburn
- Captain: (England) Sam Northeast (red ball) (Wales) Kiran Carlson (white ball)
- Overseas player: (Australia) Marnus Labuschagne (South Africa) Colin Ingram (Pakistan) Mir Hamza (New Zealand) Fraser Sheat
- Ground(s): Sophia Gardens, Cardiff; The Gnoll, Neath
- County Championship: 6th, Division 2
- One-Day Cup: Winners
- T20 Blast: 6th, South Group
- Most runs: FC: Colin Ingram (1,351); LA: Colin Ingram (297); T20: Kiran Carlson (380)
- Most wickets: FC: Timm van der Gugten (30); James Harris (30); LA: Andy Gorvin (19); Dan Douthwaite (19); T20: Mason Crane (19)
- Most catches: FC: Colin Ingram (9); LA: Colin Ingram (7); T20: Marnus Labuschagne (15)
- Most wicket-keeping dismissals: FC: Chris Cooke (36 ct + 3 st); LA: Will Smale (22 ct + 0 st); T20: Chris Cooke (9 ct + 3 st)

The 2024 season was Glamorgan County Cricket Club's 137th year in existence and their 104th as a first-class cricket county. They competed in the Second Division of the County Championship, as well as Group B of the One-Day Cup and the South Group of the T20 Blast. They played two 50-over matches at The Gnoll in Neath for the third year in a row, while also not returning to Penrhyn Avenue in Rhos-on-Sea for the fifth year in a row.

It was the team's first season with Grant Bradburn as their head coach and Sam Northeast as red-ball captain, following the departures of red-ball coach Matthew Maynard and captain David Lloyd. White-ball coach Mark Alleyne also left, allowing Bradburn to unite the roles held by Maynard and Alleyne, while Kiran Carlson was appointed as white-ball captain, taking T20 duties in addition to the 50-over role he already held. Australian Marnus Labuschagne and South African Colin Ingram returned as the team's overseas players, along with Pakistani Mir Hamza, who would be available until 27 May.

== Pre-season and friendlies ==
=== MCC University Match: Glamorgan v Cardiff MCCU (31 March – 2 April) ===
31 March – 2 April
Report

Cardiff MCCU	v	Glamorgan
206 (44 overs); JP Phillips 65 (67); Jamie McIlroy 4/57 (13 overs)		264/8d (65 overs); Sam Northeast 82* (91); JA Davies 4/52 (17 overs)
63/7 (28.4 overs); HLA Friend 26 (43); Harry Podmore 3/10 (4.2 overs)

Match drawn
Sophia Gardens, Cardiff
Umpires: Paul Baldwin and Anna Harris

- Glamorgan won the toss and elected to bat.
- Play on day 1 was not possible until 15:30 due to rain.
- 14 players per side (11 batting, 11 fielding)

=== NCCA Showcase Match: Wiltshire v Glamorgan (21 July) ===
21 July 2024
Scorecard

Wiltshire; 236 (49.4 overs)	v	Glamorgan; 238/3 (39.1 overs)
Dylan Church 56 (87); Ben Morris 4/57 (10 overs)		Asa Tribe 93* (90); Will Naish 2/61 (10 overs)

Glamorgan won by 7 wickets
Swindon Cricket Club
Umpires: Darren Turl and Andrew Hicks

- Glamorgan won the toss and elected to field.

== County Championship ==
=== Matches ===
==== Middlesex v Glamorgan (5–8 April) ====
5–8 April
Scorecard

Glamorgan	v	Middlesex
620/3d (139 overs); Sam Northeast 335* (412); Ethan Bamber 2/90 (25 overs)		655 (211.2 overs); Ryan Higgins 221 (360); Kiran Carlson 3/147 (47 overs)
31/2 (16 overs); Sam Northeast 14* (42); Ethan Bamber 1/8 (4 overs)

Match drawn
Lord's, London
Umpires: Hassan Adnan and James Middlebrook

- Middlesex won the toss and elected to field.
- Points: Glamorgan 13, Middlesex 11.

==== Glamorgan v Derbyshire (12–15 April) ====
12–15 April
Scorecard

Glamorgan	v	Derbyshire
237 (78 overs); Kiran Carlson 74 (99); Alex Thomson 7/65 (26 overs)		198 (79.5 overs); Wayne Madsen 63 (113); Mason Crane 4/60 (25.5 overs)
361/7d (104.3 overs); Chris Cooke 126* (195); Alex Thomson 5/136 (44 overs)		225/3 (75 overs); Luis Reece 91* (205); James Harris 2/24 (11 overs)

Match drawn
Sophia Gardens, Cardiff
Umpires: Neil Bainton and Rob Bailey

- Derbyshire won the toss and elected to field.
- Bad light on day 3 reduced play to 90 overs.
- Points: Glamorgan 11, Derbyshire 11.

==== Northamptonshire v Glamorgan (19–22 April) ====
19–22 April
Scorecard

Glamorgan	v	Northamptonshire
271 (74.2 overs); Colin Ingram 82 (125); Ben Sanderson 5/92 (26 overs)		605/6d (145.4 overs); Karun Nair 202* (253); James Harris 2/109 (26 overs)
104/3 (40 overs); Billy Root 41 (61); Saif Zaib 1/22 (11 overs)

Match drawn
County Cricket Ground, Northampton
Umpires: Graham Lloyd and Sue Redfern

- Northamptonshire won the toss and elected to field.
- Rain on day 1 reduced play to 56.1 overs.
- No play was possible on day 4 due to rain.
- Points: Northamptonshire 15, Glamorgan 10.

==== Yorkshire v Glamorgan (3–6 May) ====
3–6 May
Scorecard

Glamorgan	v	Yorkshire
221 (79 overs); Billy Root 51 (95); Dom Bess 4/25 (13 overs)		519/7d (94.1 overs); Finlay Bean 173 (189); Mason Crane 5/152 (23.1 overs)
372/7 (138 overs); Sam Northeast 142* (336); Adam Lyth 2/21 (6 overs)

Match drawn
Headingley Cricket Ground, Leeds
Umpires: Ian Blackwell and Mark Newell

- Glamorgan won the toss and elected to bat.
- Play on day 1 was reduced to 41 overs due to rain.
- Play on day 2 was reduced to 87 overs due to rain.
- Points: Yorkshire 16, Glamorgan 10.

==== Glamorgan v Sussex (10–13 May) ====
10–13 May
Scorecard

Sussex	v	Glamorgan
278 (87.2 overs); Fynn Hudson-Prentice 48 (64); Mir Hamza 4/70 (23 overs)		411 (102.2 overs); Colin Ingram 170 (248); Jayden Seales 5/101 (23.2 overs)
188 (49.3 overs); Fynn Hudson-Prentice 70 (74); Andy Gorvin 5/40 (13 overs)		58/1 (7.5 overs); Billy Root 36* (28); Ari Karvelas 1/33 (3.5 overs)

Glamorgan won by 9 wickets
Sophia Gardens, Cardiff
Umpires: Chris Watts and Surendiran Shanmugam

- Glamorgan won the toss and elected to field.
- Points: Glamorgan 23, Sussex 4.

==== Glamorgan v Middlesex (17–20 May) ====
17–20 May
Scorecard

Glamorgan	v	Middlesex
183 (72.5 overs); Zain-ul-Hassan 34 (78); Tom Helm 4/44 (17 overs)		343 (117 overs); Mark Stoneman 129 (244); James Harris 4/84 (28 overs)
372 (112.2 overs); Marnus Labuschagne 111 (200); Luke Hollman 3/57 (14.2 overs)		213/8 (64 overs); Mark Stoneman 63 (117); Mason Crane 5/99 (27 overs)

Middlesex won by 2 wickets
Sophia Gardens, Cardiff
Umpires: Jack Shantry and Paul Baldwin

- Middlesex won the toss and elected to field.
- Rain on day 2 reduced play to 80 overs.
- Points: Middlesex 21, Glamorgan 2.

==== Leicestershire v Glamorgan (24–27 May) ====
24–27 May
Scorecard

Glamorgan	v	Leicestershire
387 (104.5 overs); Eddie Byrom 86 (135); Scott Currie 5/64 (26 overs)		343/9d (119 overs); Peter Handscomb 103 (178); Timm van der Gugten 5/65 (26 overs)
157/4 (59.3 overs); Sam Northeast 41* (86); Ben Mike 2/29 (11 overs)

Match drawn
Grace Road, Leicester
Umpires: Hassan Adnan and Neil Bainton

- Leicestershire won the toss and elected to field.
- Rain on day 3 reduced play to 43 overs.
- Rain on day 4 reduced play to 51 overs.
- Points: Leicestershire 13, Glamorgan 13.

==== Glamorgan v Northamptonshire (23–26 June) ====
23–26 June
Scorecard

Northamptonshire	v	Glamorgan
279 (86.3 overs); Emilio Gay 65 (93); Timm van der Gugten 3/39 (22.3 overs)		490 (131.5 overs); Marnus Labuschagne 93 (124); Luke Procter 3/51 (20 overs)
472/8d (120 overs); Lewis McManus 168* (200); Mason Crane 3/178 (41 overs)		207/8 (38.5 overs); Marnus Labuschagne 64 (62); Liam Patterson-White 3/101 (18.5 overs)

Match drawn
Sophia Gardens, Cardiff
Umpires: Hassan Adnan and Sue Redfern

- Northamptonshire won the toss and elected to bat.
- Gus Miller (Nhnts) made his first-class debut.
- Points: Glamorgan 15, Northamptonshire 11.

==== Gloucestershire v Glamorgan (30 June – 3 July) ====
30 June – 3 July
Scorecard

Gloucestershire	v	Glamorgan
179 (44.4 overs); Marchant de Lange 46 (37); Timm van der Gugten 5/59 (15 overs)		197 (61.1 overs); Mason Crane 44 (56); Beau Webster 5/17 (10.1 overs)
610/5d (116 overs); James Bracey 204* (231); Timm van der Gugten 2/98 (22 overs)		592 (152 overs); Sam Northeast 187 (277); Matt Taylor 3/120 (31 overs)

Match tied
Bristol County Ground, Bristol
Umpires: Naeem Ashraf and Paul Baldwin

- Glamorgan won the toss and elected to field.
- Points: Gloucestershire 11, Glamorgan 11.

==== Derbyshire v Glamorgan (22–25 August) ====
22–25 August
Scorecard

Glamorgan	v	Derbyshire
168 (47.3 overs); Timm van der Gugten 46* (99); Zak Chappell 6/47 (16 overs)		429 (117.1 overs); Anuj Dal 94 (135); Mason Crane 3/43 (17.1 overs)
287 (99 overs); Kiran Carlson 56 (139); Jack Morley 3/46 (27 overs)		27/0 (6.4 overs); Harry Came 16* (22)

Derbyshire won by 10 wickets
County Cricket Ground, Derby
Umpires: Ben Debenham and Ben Peverall

- Derbyshire won the toss and elected to field.
- Points: Derbyshire 23, Glamorgan 3.

==== Glamorgan v Leicestershire (29 August – 1 September) ====
29 August – 1 September
Scorecard

Leicestershire	v	Glamorgan
251 (68.5 overs); Peter Handscomb 46 (63); Timm van der Gugten 4/45 (19 overs)		550/9d (147 overs); Colin Ingram 257* (375); Ian Holland 4/96 (29 overs)
369/6 (117.2 overs); Peter Handscomb 139* (253); Kiran Carlson 2/17 (12 overs)

Match drawn
Sophia Gardens, Cardiff
Umpires: Hassan Adnan and Neil Pratt

- Glamorgan won the toss and elected to field.
- Sam Wood (Leics) and Asa Tribe (Glam) made their first-class debuts.
- Points: Glamorgan 14, Leicestershire 11.

==== Sussex v Glamorgan (9–12 September) ====
9–12 September
Scorecard

Glamorgan	v	Sussex
186 (57.3 overs); Kiran Carlson 56 (81); Jaydev Unadkat 4/52 (15 overs)		491 (132 overs); John Simpson 117 (160); Ben Kellaway 5/142 (43 overs)
218 (72.2 overs); Colin Ingram 71 (102); Ollie Robinson 3/38 (17 overs)

Sussex won by an innings and 87 runs
County Cricket Ground, Hove
Umpires: Nigel Llong and Sue Redfern

- Sussex won the toss and elected to field.
- Points: Sussex 23, Glamorgan 1.

==== Glamorgan v Yorkshire (17–20 September) ====
17–20 September
Scorecard

Yorkshire	v	Glamorgan
361 (91.1 overs); George Hill 90 (115); Andy Gorvin 4/67 (22.1 overs)		239 (68.5 overs); Colin Ingram 82 (117); Ben Coad 4/55 (14.5 overs); Matthew Fisher 4/55 (18 overs)
273 (65.5 overs); Finlay Bean 57 (93); James Harris 5/73 (17.5 overs)		209 (67.5 overs); Asa Tribe 58 (155); Ben Coad 4/51 (20 overs)

Yorkshire won by 186 runs
Sophia Gardens, Cardiff
Umpires: David Millns and Naeem Ashraf

- Glamorgan won the toss and elected to field.
- Ben Morris (Glam) made his first-class debut.
- Points: Yorkshire 22, Glamorgan 3.

==== Glamorgan v Gloucestershire (26–29 September) ====
26–29 September
Scorecard

Glamorgan	v	Gloucestershire
381/4d (85.3 overs); Chris Cooke 101* (121); Matt Taylor 3/71 (19 overs)		forfeit
forfeit		189 (63.5 overs); Joe Phillips 64 (115); Andy Gorvin 3/22 (13 overs)

Glamorgan won by 192 runs
Sophia Gardens, Cardiff
Umpires: Mark Newell and Simon Widdup

- Gloucestershire won the toss and elected to field.
- No play possible on day 1 due to rain.
- Start delayed to 12:00 on day 2 due to rain.
- Points: Glamorgan 19, Gloucestershire 1.

=== Standings ===
Pos	Team	Pld	W	L	T	D	A	Bat	Bowl	Ded	Pts	
1	Sussex	14	8	2	0	4	0	40	40	3	237	Promotion to Division 1
2	Yorkshire	14	5	2	0	7	0	41	40	0	217	Promotion to Division 1
3	Middlesex	14	5	2	0	7	0	28	32	0	196	
4	Northamptonshire	14	2	3	0	9	0	22	35	0	161	
5	Leicestershire	14	1	3	0	10	0	28	31	0	155	
6	Glamorgan	14	2	4	1	7	0	22	30	2	146	
7	Gloucestershire	14	2	5	1	5	1	27	29	2	142	
8	Derbyshire	14	1	6	0	6	1	20	31	1	122	

Source: ESPNcricinfo, ECB, BBC

== One-Day Cup ==
=== Group stage ===
==== Matches ====
===== Glamorgan v Gloucestershire (25 July) =====
25 July
Scorecard

Glamorgan; 187/8 (33 overs)	v	Gloucestershire; 160 (30.1 overs)
Ben Kellaway 65* (60); Dominic Goodman 3/53 (7 overs)		James Bracey 86 (79); Dan Douthwaite 4/25 (7 overs)

Glamorgan won by 27 runs
Sophia Gardens, Cardiff
Umpires: Ben Peverall and Paul Baldwin

- Gloucestershire won the toss and elected to field.
- Rain reduced the match to 33 overs a side.
- Points: Glamorgan 2, Gloucestershire 0.

===== Surrey v Glamorgan (28 July) =====
28 July
Scorecard

Surrey; 121 (34 overs)	v	Glamorgan; 123/3 (15.5 overs)
Ben Foakes 44 (70); Ben Kellaway 2/16 (7 overs)		Colin Ingram 39* (26); James Taylor 1/32 (5.5 overs)

Glamorgan won by 7 wickets
The Oval, London
Umpires: Casper Viljoen and Jack Shantry

- Glamorgan won the toss and elected to field.
- Points: Glamorgan 2, Surrey 0.

===== Glamorgan v Nottinghamshire (31 July) =====
31 July
Scorecard

Glamorgan; 274/9 (50 overs)	v	Nottinghamshire; 278/2 (45.3 overs)
Haseeb Hameed 89 (109); Andy Gorvin 5/56 (10 overs)		Eddie Byrom 123* (131); Liam Patterson-White 1/40 (8 overs)

Glamorgan won by 8 wickets
The Gnoll, Neath
Umpires: Anthony Harris and Simon Widdup

- Glamorgan won the toss and elected to field.
- Points: Glamorgan 2, Nottinghamshire 0.

===== Glamorgan v Sussex (2 August) =====
2 August
Scorecard

Sussex; 200 (47.2 overs)	v	Glamorgan; 203/9 (48.3 overs)
Tom Haines 44 (69); Dan Douthwaite 4/44 (9 overs)		Eddie Byrom 51 (46); Archie Lenham 3/29 (10 overs)

Glamorgan won by 1 wicket
The Gnoll, Neath
Umpires: Anthony Harris and Naeem Ashraf

- Glamorgan won the toss and elected to field.
- Points: Glamorgan 2, Sussex 0.

===== Essex v Glamorgan (4 August) =====
4 August
Scorecard

Glamorgan; 283 (49.4 overs)	v	Essex; 251 (46.4 overs)
Sam Northeast 89 (93); Shane Snater 3/45 (10 overs)		Tom Westley 51 (73); Jamie McIlroy 3/33 (9 overs)

Glamorgan won by 32 runs
County Cricket Ground, Chelmsford
Umpires: Ben Debenham and Phil Mustard

- Essex won the toss and elected to field.
- Points: Glamorgan 2, Essex 0.

===== Warwickshire v Glamorgan (8 August) =====
8 August
Scorecard

Glamorgan; 143/5 (18 overs)	v	Warwickshire
Sam Northeast 68* (39); Oliver Hannon-Dalby 2/21 (4 overs)

No result
Edgbaston Cricket Ground, Birmingham
Umpires: Anna Harris and Jack Shantry

- Glamorgan won the toss and elected to bat.
- The Glamorgan innings was reduced to 18 overs and no play was possible in the Warwickshire innings due to rain.
- Points: Glamorgan 1, Warwickshire 1.

===== Leicestershire v Glamorgan (11 August) =====
11 August
Scorecard

Leicestershire; 271/8 (50 overs)	v	Glamorgan; 262 (48.4 overs)
Peter Handscomb 103 (94); Timm van der Gugten 5/49 (10 overs)		Colin Ingram 68 (68); Liam Trevaskis 4/54 (10 overs)

Leicestershire won by 9 runs
Grace Road, Leicester
Umpires: Peter Hartley and Simon Widdup

- Glamorgan won the toss and elected to field.
- Points: Leicestershire 2, Glamorgan 0.

===== Glamorgan v Yorkshire (14 August) =====
14 August
Scorecard

Glamorgan; 230/9 (47 overs)	v	Yorkshire; 168 (42 overs)
Billy Root 66 (68); Ben Cliff 3/37 (7 overs)		Jonny Tattersall 51 (68); Andy Gorvin 4/35 (8 overs)

Glamorgan won by 62 runs
Sophia Gardens, Cardiff
Umpires: Paul Baldwin and Sam Hollingshead

- Yorkshire won the toss and elected to field.
- Match reduced to 47 overs-a-side due to rain.
- Noah Kelly (Yorks) made his List A debut.

==== Standings ====
Pos	Team	Pld	W	L	T	NR	Ded	Pts	NRR
1	Glamorgan	8	6	1	0	1	0	13	1.204
2	Leicestershire	8	6	2	0	0	0	12	−0.416
3	Warwickshire	8	5	2	0	1	0	11	0.629
4	Nottinghamshire	8	4	4	0	0	0	8	0.454
5	Gloucestershire	8	4	4	0	0	0	8	0.244
6	Yorkshire	8	4	4	0	0	0	8	−0.232
7	Essex	8	3	5	0	0	0	6	−0.098
8	Surrey	8	2	6	0	0	0	4	−0.760
9	Sussex	8	1	7	0	0	0	2	−0.690

Source: BBC Sport, ECB, ESPNcricinfo.
- Advanced directly to the semi-finals
- Advanced to the quarter-finals

=== Knockout stage ===
==== Bracket ====
Quarter-finals
A2	Worcestershire	286/9 (50 ov)
B3	Warwickshire	288/6 (49 ov)
B2	Leicestershire	291/7 (49.5 ov)
A3	Hampshire	290/8 (50 ov)

Semi-finals
B1	Glamorgan	247/9 (50 ov)
QF1	Warwickshire	208 (46.1 ov)
A1	Somerset	334/4 (50 ov)
QF2	Leicestershire	311/9 (50 ov)

Final
SF1	Glamorgan
SF2	Somerset

==== Matches ====
===== Semi-final: Glamorgan v Warwickshire (18 August) =====
18 August
Scorecard

Glamorgan; 247/9 (50 overs)	v	Warwickshire; 208 (46.1 overs)
Dan Douthwaite 55* (35); Ed Barnard 4/34 (10 overs)		Michael Burgess 85 (94); Jamie McIlroy 3/42 (9 overs)

Glamorgan won by 39 runs
Sophia Gardens, Cardiff
Umpires: Neil Pratt and Nigel Llong

- Warwickshire won the toss and elected to field.

===== Final: Glamorgan v Somerset (22–23 September) =====
22–23 September
Scorecard

Glamorgan; 186/7 (20 overs)	v	Somerset; 171/6 (20 overs)
Sam Northeast 63* (49); George Thomas 2/23 (4 overs)		Andrew Umeed 45 (36); Ben Kellaway 2/37 (4 overs)

Glamorgan won by 15 runs
Trent Bridge, Nottingham
Umpires: David Millns and Rob White

- Somerset won the toss and elected to field.
- No play was possible on 22 September due to rain.
- Conditions on the reserve day meant the match was reduced to 20 overs-a-side.

== T20 Blast ==
=== Matches ===
==== Glamorgan v Surrey (31 May) ====
31 May (D/N)
Scorecard

Surrey; 200/8 (20 overs)	v	Glamorgan; 181/7 (20 overs)
Jamie Smith 76 (38); Dan Douthwaite 2/26 (4 overs)		Marnus Labuschagne 58 (34); Jordan Clark 2/27 (4 overs)

Surrey won by 19 runs
Sophia Gardens, Cardiff
Umpires: Jack Shantry and Tom Lungley

- Glamorgan won the toss and elected to field.
- Points: Surrey 2, Glamorgan 0.

==== Glamorgan v Sussex (2 June) ====
2 June
Scorecard

Glamorgan; 183/7 (20 overs)	v	Sussex; 158/6 (20 overs)
Sam Northeast 61* (43); Tymal Mills 4/33 (4 overs)		James Coles 69* (49); Mason Crane 2/22 (4 overs)

Glamorgan won by 25 runs
Sophia Gardens, Cardiff
Umpires: David Millns and Mike Burns

- Glamorgan won the toss and elected to bat.
- Points: Glamorgan 2, Sussex 0.

==== Middlesex v Glamorgan (6 June) ====
6 June (D/N)
Scorecard

Middlesex; 173 (20 overs)	v	Glamorgan; 177/7 (18.2 overs)
Martin Andersson 57 (34); Mason Crane 3/28 (3 overs)		Sam Northeast 67 (46); Henry Brookes 3/31 (3 overs)

Glamorgan won by 3 wickets
Lord's, London
Umpires: Ian Blackwell and Nigel Llong

- Middlesex won the toss and elected to bat.
- Points: Glamorgan 2, Middlesex 0.

==== Essex v Glamorgan (7 June) ====
7 June (D/N)
Scorecard

Glamorgan; 166/8 (20 overs)	v	Essex; 168/8 (18.4 overs)
Colin Ingram 52 (29); Daniel Sams 3/28 (4 overs)		Adam Rossington 48 (24); Mason Crane 4/25 (4 overs)

Essex won by 2 wickets
County Cricket Ground, Chelmsford
Umpires: Mark Newell and Paul Pollard

- Essex won the toss and elected to field.
- Points: Essex 2, Glamorgan 0.

==== Glamorgan v Hampshire (13 June) ====
13 June (D/N)
Scorecard

Glamorgan	v	Hampshire

Match abandoned without a ball bowled
Sophia Gardens, Cardiff

- No toss.
- No play was possible due to rain.
- Points: Glamorgan 1, Hampshire 1.

==== Somerset v Glamorgan (16 June) ====
16 June
Scorecard

Somerset; 193/8 (20 overs)	v	Glamorgan; 85 (13.2 overs)
Will Smeed 86 (48); Dan Douthwaite 4/37 (4 overs)		Sam Northeast 24 (15); Lewis Gregory 3/11 (3 overs)

Somerset won by 108 runs
County Ground, Taunton
Umpires: Jack Shantry and Mike Burns

- Glamorgan won the toss and elected to field.
- Points: Somerset 2, Glamorgan 0.

==== Glamorgan v Gloucestershire (20 June) ====
20 June (D/N)
Scorecard

Glamorgan; 140/6 (20 overs)	v	Gloucestershire; 142/8 (20 overs)
Sam Northeast 46* (42); Matt Taylor 3/21 (4 overs)		Jack Taylor 70 (48); Timm van der Gugten 2/8 (4 overs)

Gloucestershire won by 2 wickets
Sophia Gardens, Cardiff
Umpires: Paul Baldwin and Russell Warren

- Glamorgan won the toss and elected to bat.
- Points: Gloucestershire 2, Glamorgan 0.

==== Surrey v Glamorgan (21 June) ====
21 June (D/N)
Scorecard

Glamorgan; 107/9 (20 overs)	v	Surrey; 108/1 (9 overs)
Marnus Labuschagne 20 (24); Gus Atkinson 3/19 (4 overs)		Dom Sibley 44* (26); Chris Sole 1/22 (2 overs)

Surrey won by 9 wickets
The Oval, London
Umpires: Ian Blackwell and Mark Newell

- Glamorgan won the toss and elected to bat.
- Points: Surrey 2, Glamorgan 0.

==== Sussex v Glamorgan (5 July) ====
5 July (D/N)
Scorecard

Glamorgan; 235/6 (20 overs)	v	Sussex; 190/8 (20 overs)
Kiran Carlson 87 (47); Tymal Mills 4/29 (4 overs)		Daniel Hughes 74 (38); Dan Douthwaite 2/31 (3 overs)

Glamorgan won by 24 runs (DLS method)
County Cricket Ground, Hove
Umpires: James Tredwell and Mark Newell

- Sussex won the toss and elected to field.
- Rain reduced the Sussex innings to 18 overs.
- Points: Glamorgan 2, Sussex 0.

==== Glamorgan v Essex (7 July) ====
7 July
Scorecard

Glamorgan; 182/8 (20 overs)	v	Essex; 156 (18.5 overs)
Colin Ingram 47 (28); Ben Allison 3/52 (4 overs)		Paul Walter 53 (33); Timm van der Gugten 3/20 (4 overs)

Glamorgan won by 26 runs
Sophia Gardens, Cardiff
Umpires: Ben Peverall and Rob White

- Essex won the toss and elected to field.
- Points: Glamorgan 2, Essex 0.

==== Glamorgan v Middlesex (12 July) ====
12 July (D/N)
Scorecard

Glamorgan; 88/9 (10 overs)	v	Middlesex; 89/4 (9.3 overs)
Mason Crane 18* (9); Luke Hollman 4/13 (2 overs)		Martin Andersson 30 (23); Dan Douthwaite 1/13 (2 overs)

Middlesex won by 6 wickets
Sophia Gardens, Cardiff
Umpires: Ben Peverall and Richard Illingworth

- Middlesex won the toss and elected to field.
- Rain reduced the match to 10 overs a side.
- Points: Middlesex 2, Glamorgan 0.

==== Gloucestershire v Glamorgan (14 July) ====
14 July
Scorecard

Gloucestershire; 206/6 (20 overs)	v	Glamorgan; 85 (15.5 overs)
Jack Taylor 80* (35); Andy Gorvin 3/26 (4 overs)		Colin Ingram 20 (12); David Payne 3/7 (3 overs)

Gloucestershire won by 121 runs
College Ground, Cheltenham
Umpires: Alex Wharf and Surendiran Shanmugam

- Glamorgan won the toss and elected to field.
- Points: Gloucestershire 2, Glamorgan 0.

==== Kent v Glamorgan (16 July) ====
16 July (D/N)
Scorecard

Glamorgan; 145/6 (13 overs)	v	Kent; 132/5 (13 overs)
Marnus Labuschagne 50* (26); Nathan Gilchrist 2/21 (3 overs)		Sam Billings 33 (17); Timm van der Gugten 2/26 (3 overs)

Glamorgan won by 13 runs
St Lawrence Ground, Canterbury
Umpires: Ben Debenham and Rob Bailey
Player of the match: Marnus Labuschagne (Glam)

- Kent won the toss and elected to field.
- Rain reduced the match to 13 overs a side.
- Points: Glamorgan 2, Kent 0.

==== Glamorgan v Somerset (19 July) ====
19 July (D/N)
Scorecard

Glamorgan; 243/4 (20 overs)	v	Somerset; 123 (13.3 overs)
Kiran Carlson 135 (64); Ben Green 2/48 (3 overs)		Tom Abell 29 (20); Marnus Labuschagne 5/11 (2.3 overs)

Glamorgan won by 120 runs
Sophia Gardens, Cardiff
Umpires: Paul Baldwin and Surendiran Shanmugam

- Glamorgan won the toss and elected to bat.
- Points: Glamorgan 2, Somerset 0.

=== Standings ===
Pos	Team	Pld	W	L	T	NR	Pts	NRR
1	Surrey	14	9	3	1	1	20	0.777
2	Sussex Sharks	14	9	5	0	0	18	0.607
3	Somerset	14	8	5	0	1	17	0.497
4	Gloucestershire	14	7	6	1	0	15	0.503
5	Essex Eagles	14	7	6	0	1	15	0.201
6	Glamorgan	14	6	7	0	1	13	−0.592
7	Hampshire Hawks	14	4	7	0	3	11	−0.556
8	Middlesex	14	3	8	0	3	9	−1.487
9	Kent Spitfires	14	4	10	0	0	8	−0.486

Source: ESPNcricinfo

Advance to the quarter-finals

== Statistics ==
=== Batting ===
First-class
Player	Matches	Innings	NO	Runs	HS	Ave	SR	100	50	0	4s	6s
Colin Ingram	11	18	3	1,351	257*	90.06	64.27	5	6	0	182	11
Sam Northeast	14	26	6	1,004	335*	50.20	58.20	3	2	6	112	6
Kiran Carlson	14	25	2	923	148	40.13	60.60	1	8	2	108	6
Chris Cooke	14	22	3	582	126*	30.63	51.68	2	1	2	60	6
Billy Root	11	21	1	528	67	26.40	53.87	0	2	0	68	0
Marnus Labuschagne	4	8	0	468	119	58.50	65.45	2	2	0	66	1
Mason Crane	11	18	5	468	61	36.00	48.44	0	2	1	60	2
Eddie Byrom	6	12	0	325	86	27.08	51.26	0	1	0	52	3
James Harris	11	14	1	288	61*	22.15	50.34	0	1	2	38	2
Dan Douthwaite	7	10	0	266	50	26.60	48.45	0	1	0	39	0
Source: ESPNcricinfo

List A
Player	Matches	Innings	NO	Runs	HS	Ave	SR	100	50	0	4s	6s
Colin Ingram	7	7	2	297	103*	59.40	102.06	1	1	0	37	6
Billy Root	10	9	1	296	66	37.00	83.85	0	1	0	25	3
Sam Northeast	6	6	2	264	89	66.00	106.02	0	3	0	24	5
Eddie Byrom	5	5	1	213	123*	53.25	93.01	1	1	0	28	5
Will Smale	10	10	0	179	42	17.90	77.15	0	0	1	30	1
Dan Douthwaite	10	8	1	176	61	25.14	110.69	0	2	0	12	10
Kiran Carlson	10	10	0	139	32	13.90	69.50	0	0	1	15	1
Timm van der Gugten	9	6	2	134	34*	33.50	90.54	0	0	0	15	3
Ben Kellaway	7	5	1	122	65*	30.50	84.13	0	1	0	14	0
Asa Tribe	6	6	1	63	26	12.60	65.62	0	0	0	5	1
Source: ESPNcricinfo

Twenty20
Player	Matches	Innings	NO	Runs	HS	Ave	SR	100	50	0	4s	6s
Kiran Carlson	13	13	0	380	135	29.23	158.33	1	2	0	35	20
Colin Ingram	13	13	0	353	52	27.15	155.50	0	2	0	41	12
Marnus Labuschagne	13	12	1	228	58	20.72	121.27	0	2	2	28	4
Sam Northeast	7	7	2	216	67	43.20	130.12	0	2	0	22	6
Chris Cooke	13	13	1	204	40*	17.00	146.76	0	0	1	16	10
Will Smale	6	6	0	138	59	23.00	168.29	0	1	0	16	7
Dan Douthwaite	13	12	4	86	21	10.75	94.50	0	0	0	5	1
Tom Bevan	8	7	0	85	34	12.14	137.09	0	0	1	4	7
Timm van der Gugten	11	9	3	54	17*	9.00	145.94	0	0	0	7	1
Mason Crane	13	6	3	50	19	16.66	116.27	0	0	0	4	2
Source: ESPNcricinfo

=== Bowling ===
First-class
Player	Matches	Innings	Overs	Maidens	Runs	Wickets	BBI	BBM	Ave	Econ	SR	5w	10w
Timm van der Gugten	7	11	228.3	50	659	30	5/59	7/157	21.96	2.88	45.70	2	0
James Harris	11	16	309.5	57	1,139	30	5/73	6/154	37.96	3.67	61.96	1	0
Mason Crane	11	17	304.2	28	1,287	29	5/99	6/151	44.37	4.22	62.96	2	0
Andy Gorvin	7	12	185.3	46	575	24	5/40	6/83	23.95	3.09	46.37	1	0
Dan Douthwaite	7	10	126.0	15	570	15	4/49	6/123	38.00	4.52	50.40	0	0
Ben Kellaway	4	5	80.5	10	270	12	5/142	5/142	22.50	3.34	40.41	1	0
Mir Hamza	6	8	151.0	35	426	12	4/70	7/104	35.50	2.82	75.50	0	0
Kiran Carlson	14	18	184.0	25	589	10	3/147	3/147	58.90	3.20	110.40	0	0
Ned Leonard	4	5	91.2	16	333	5	2/42	2/42	66.60	3.64	109.60	0	0
Jamie McIlroy	5	6	111.0	18	377	3	2/73	2/104	125.66	3.39	222.00	0	0
Source: ESPNcricinfo

List A
Player	Matches	Innings	Overs	Maidens	Runs	Wickets	BBI	Ave	Econ	SR	4w	5w
Andy Gorvin	10	9	68.2	0	352	19	5/56	18.52	5.15	21.57	1	1
Dan Douthwaite	10	9	69.4	3	391	19	4/25	20.57	5.61	22.00	2	0
Timm van der Gugten	9	8	71.0	16	246	14	5/49	17.57	3.46	30.42	0	1
Jamie McIlroy	10	9	69.2	12	296	14	3/33	21.14	4.26	29.71	0	0
Ben Kellaway	7	7	46.0	1	256	11	3/33	23.27	5.56	25.09	0	0
Ben Morris	1	1	10.0	0	52	3	3/52	17.33	5.20	20.00	0	0
Source: ESPNcricinfo

Twenty20
Player	Matches	Innings	Overs	Maidens	Runs	Wickets	BBI	Ave	Econ	SR	4w	5w
Mason Crane	13	12	42.0	0	358	19	4/25	18.84	8.52	13.26	1	0
Timm van der Gugten	11	11	39.0	3	334	16	3/20	20.87	8.56	14.62	0	0
Dan Douthwaite	13	13	40.0	0	393	16	4/37	24.56	9.82	15.00	1	0
Marnus Labuschagne	13	10	24.3	1	193	15	5/11	12.86	7.87	9.80	0	1
Andy Gorvin	8	6	20.0	0	165	8	3/26	20.62	8.25	15.00	0	0
Jamie McIlroy	10	10	32.3	0	313	8	2/35	39.12	9.63	24.37	0	0
Chris Sole	3	3	8.5	0	106	4	2/45	26.50	12.00	13.25	0	0
Tom Bevan	8	2	2.0	0	32	1	1/15	32.00	16.00	12.00	0	0
Colin Ingram	13	2	4.4	0	35	1	1/10	35.00	7.50	28.00	0	0
Ben Kellaway	7	3	7.0	0	68	1	1/5	68.00	9.71	42.00	0	0
Source: ESPNcricinfo
