= 1969 County Championship =

English cricket tournament

- Dates: 3 May – 16 September 1969
- Administrator: England and Wales Cricket Board
- Cricket format: First-class cricket
- Tournament format: League system
- Champions: Glamorgan (2nd title)
- Participants: 17
- Matches: 204
- Most runs: Brian Luckhurst, (Kent); 1,593
- Most wickets: Mike Procter, (Gloucestershire); 103

The 1969 County Championship was the 70th officially organised running of the County Championship. Glamorgan won the Championship title in a season which saw games played reduced from 28 to 24.

== Table ==
- 10 points for a win
- 5 points to each team for a tie
- 5 points to team still batting in a match in which scores finish level
- Bonus points awarded in first 85 overs of first innings
- Batting: 1 point for each 25 runs above 150
- Bowling: 2 point for every 2 wickets taken
- No bonus points awarded in a match starting with less than 8 hours' play remaining.
- Position determined by points gained. If equal, then decided on most wins.
- Each team plays 24 matches.

	Team	P	W	L	D	Bat	Bowl	Pts
1	Glamorgan	24	11	0	13	67	73	250
2	Gloucestershire	24	10	6	8	26	93	219
3	Surrey	24	7	1	16	64	76	210
4	Warwickshire	24	7	3	14 (Note: Warwickshire were awarded 5 points for the draw against Nottinghamshire, as they were batting fourth when scores were tied.)	41	89	205
5	Hampshire	24	6	7	11	56	87	203
6	Essex	24	6	6	12	44	85	189
7	Sussex	24	5	8	11	46	89	185
8	Nottinghamshire	24	6	2	16	49	75	184
9	Northamptonshire	24	5	7	12	47	66	163
10	Kent	24	4	6	14	35	76	151
11	Middlesex	24	3	7	14	40	76	146
=12	Worcestershire	24	5	7	12	30	62	142
=12	Yorkshire	24	3	6	15 (Note: Yorkshire were awarded 5 points for the draw against Lancashire, as they were batting fourth when scores were tied.)	30	77	142
14	Leicestershire	24	4	7	13	26	64	130
15	Lancashire	24	2	1	21	39	67	126
16	Derbyshire	24	3	5	16	22	67	119
17	Somerset	24	1	9	14	17	69	96
