= Ryan Hadley =

Australian cricketer (born 1998)

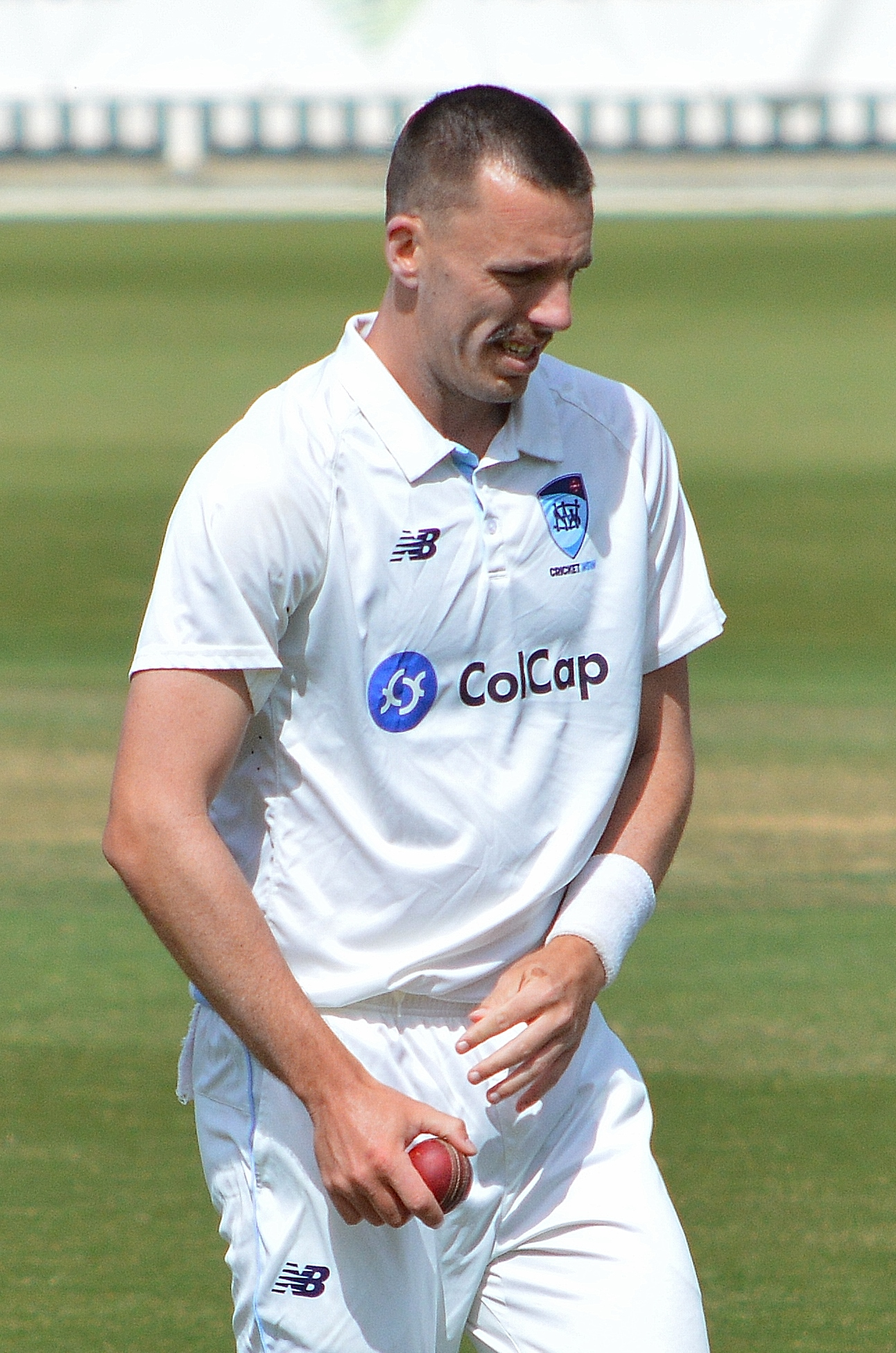
- Hadley playing First Class cricket for New South Wales in October 2025

Personal information
- Full name: Ryan Edward Hadley
- Born: 17 November 1998 (age 27)
- Batting: Right-handed
- Bowling: Right-arm medium-fast
- Role: Bowler

Domestic team information
- Years: Team
- 2022/23–present: New South Wales
- 2025/26–present: Sydney Thunder (squad no. 34)
- 2026: Glamorgan

Career statistics
Competition	FC	LA	T20
Matches	23	7	4
Runs scored	123	9	1
Batting average	9.46	–	1.00
100s/50s	0/1	0/0	0/0
Top score	50*	4*	1
Balls bowled	3,608	348	68
Wickets	63	12	2
Bowling average	33.50	27.66	72.50
5 wickets in innings	1	1	0
10 wickets in match	0	0	0
Best bowling	5/38	5/69	2/37
Catches/stumpings	7/–	2/–	0/–
- Source: ESPNcricinfo, 15 July 2026

Ryan Edward Hadley is an Australian cricketer. He made his first-class cricket debut for New South Wales against South Australia on 14 March 2023.

He was handed his first New South Wales contract in 2021–22 season.

Hadley graduated from Doonside Technology High School.

== Career ==
In April 2017, he was selected in the Australia Under-19's squad against Sri Lanka Under-19's for a Youth One Day International and a three-day Youth Test match.

In December 2017, he was selected to the Australia Under-19 squad for the 2018 Under-19 Cricket World Cup.

In April 2022, Hadley joined Balbriggan Cricket Club as an overseas professional. He featured 20 times in all competitions, claiming 35 wickets at 17.03. Balbriggan won the Premier Division of the Leinster Cricket Union.

Hadley was signed by the Sydney Thunder on 5 December 2024. Despite not taking part in the 2024–25 BBL season (BBL|14), Hadley was extended with the Thunder for BBL|15 on 29 June 2025..

Hadley made his Big Bash League debut on 28 December 2025 against the Melbourne Stars at Manuka Oval in Canberra. He returned bowling figures of 3/32 for the match. On 27 January 2026, the Sydney Thunder took to social media to announce Hadley's resigning with the franchise until the end of the 2027–28 BBL season.

In March 2026, Hadley agreed to join Glamorgan County Cricket Club as an overseas player for the club's first six matches of that year's English County Championship season.
