= Cresselly Cricket Club Ground =

Cricket ground in Cresselly

Coordinates: 51°43′14.44″N 4°48′09.81″W

Ground information
- Location: Cresselly, Pembrokeshire
- Establishment: 1887; 1979 (first recorded match)
- End names
- Pavilion End; School End

Team information
Glamorgan	(2007)
- As of 15 August 2010; Source: Ground profile

Cresselly Cricket Club Ground is a cricket ground in Cresselly, Pembrokeshire. The first recorded match on the ground was in 1979, when Welsh Schools played Irish Schools.In 2007, Glamorgan played a single List-A match at the ground against Surrey.

In local domestic cricket, Cresselly Cricket Club Ground is the home ground of Cresselly Cricket Club.
