= Ben Kellaway =

Welsh cricketer (born 2004)

Personal information
- Full name: Benjamin Ian Kellaway
- Born: 5 January 2004 (age 22); Newport, Wales
- Batting: Right-handed
- Bowling: Right-arm off break Slow left-arm orthodox

Domestic team information
- Years: Team
- 2023–: Glamorgan (squad no. 8)
- 2025–: Welsh Fire
- 2025/26: Gulf Giants
- First-class debut: 3 September 2023 Glamorgan v Worcestershire
- List A debut: 4 August 2023 Glamorgan v Worcestershire

Career statistics
| Competition | FC | LA | T20 |
|---|---|---|---|
| Matches | 31 | 14 | 45 |
| Runs scored | 1,537 | 317 | 595 |
| Batting average | 34.93 | 31.70 | 16.52 |
| 100s/50s | 3/9 | 0/3 | 0/1 |
| Top score | 181* | 82 | 53 |
| Balls bowled | 3,211 | 606 | 470 |
| Wickets | 57 | 24 | 29 |
| Bowling average | 31.82 | 23.08 | 21.55 |
| 5 wickets in innings | 3 | 0 | 0 |
| 10 wickets in match | 0 | 0 | 0 |
| Best bowling | 6/111 | 3/33 | 3/22 |
| Catches/stumpings | 16/– | 5/– | 26/– |
- Source: ESPNcricinfo, 27 September 2026

Benjamin Ian Kellaway (born 5 January 2004) is a Welsh cricketer who plays for Glamorgan County Cricket Club. Born in Newport, he is a right-handed batter and can bowl both off spin and left-arm orthodox spin.

Educated at Chepstow School and Clifton College, he came through the Glamorgan academy and was named in their team to play against Cardiff MCCU in a pre-season match in April 2022.

He earned his first senior contract with Glamorgan in October 2022. He was then included in the squad for Glamorgan's first three games of the Twenty20 season in 2023, against Gloucestershire, Somerset and Middlesex. He made his debut on 26 May 2023 in a two-wicket win against Gloucestershire; he bowled one over, conceding seven runs, and scored three runs off six deliveries with the bat. He played in the four-wicket defeat to Somerset two days later, scoring just one run off four balls with the bat, and conceding 10 runs off his single over of bowling, though he did take a catch. He was left out for the game against Middlesex on 31 May due to a clash with his university exams, and was not included for their first home game against Kent on 2 June. With several senior Glamorgan players having been called up to play in The Hundred or simply rested, Kellaway returned to action in the opening match of Glamorgan's 2023 One-Day Cup campaign against Worcestershire. Coming in with Glamorgan at 72/4, he shared a stand of 65 runs with captain Kiran Carlson and eventually top-scored with 82 runs as they finished with a total of 199; however, Worcestershire chased down the target to win by four wickets, Kellaway conceding 18 runs off his four overs.

On 30 September 2025, Kellaway was named in the England Lions squad for their tour of Australia starting in November that year.
