= Jack Hope-Bell =

Welsh cricketer (born 2007)

Personal information
- Full name: Jack Isaac Hope-Bell
- Born: 13 July 2007 (age 19); Abergavenny, Wales
- Batting: Right-handed
- Bowling: Right arm off break

Domestic team information
- Years: Team
- 2026–: Glamorgan (squad no. 23)
- First-class debut: 8 September 2026 Glamorgan v Warwickshire
- List A debut: 22 July 2026 Glamorgan v Sussex

Career statistics
Competition	FC	List A
Matches	2	8
Runs scored	40	293
Batting average	10.00	41.85
100s/50s	0/0	1/1
Top score	33	123
Balls bowled	–	120
Wickets	–	3
Bowling average	–	42.33
5 wickets in innings	–	0
10 wickets in match	–	0
Best bowling	–	2/43
Catches/stumpings	0/–	5/–
- Source: ESPNcricinfo, 26 September 2026

Jack Isaac Hope-Bell (born 13 July 2007) is a Welsh cricketer who plays for Glamorgan. He is a right-handed batter. Before making his senior debut for Glamorgan in 2026, Hope-Bell also played for the England under-19 team.

== Career ==
From Chepstow, Hope-Bell played junior cricket with Gwent Young Cricketers and Newport Cricket Club. Having joined the Glamorgan Academy in 2023, he won the Glamorgan Academy Player of the Season award in 2024. In 2025, he won the ECB U18 One-Day Cup with Glamorgan, and was selected by England U19 for their final two Youth ODIs against Bangladesh U19s that summer. He scored a century on debut for the Wales National County team against Dorset. He subsequently signed a rookie professional contract with Glamorgan in January 2026.

Hope-Bell was included in the Glamorgan squad for the 2026 One-Day Cup. He scored a century on his List A debut for the county in the One-Day Cup against Sussex on 22 July 2026, scoring 123 in a 12-run victory for Glamorgan in Neath, and was involved in a 240-run stand with Alex Horton for the sixth wicket.
