= Alex Horton =

Welsh cricketer (born 2004)

Personal information
- Full name: Alex Jack Horton
- Born: 7 January 2004 (age 22); Newport, Wales
- Batting: Right-handed
- Role: Wicket-keeper

Domestic team information
- Years: Team
- 2022–present: Glamorgan

Career statistics
Competition	LA	T20
Matches	18	11
Runs scored	498	54
Batting average	31.12	6.75
100s/50s	1/2	0/0
Top score	122	20
Catches/stumpings	10/4	7/1
- Source: Cricinfo, 9 August 2026

Alex Jack Horton (born 7 January 2004) is a Welsh cricketer who plays for Glamorgan as a wicket-keeper. Before making his senior debut for Glamorgan, Horton also played for the England under-19 cricket team. Horton was one of the youngest players to represent Glamorgan, after he made his debut for the team in a second XI match.

From Newbridge, Caerphilly, Horton took his A-Levels at St Edward's School, Oxford.

At the age of 17, Horton signed a five-year contract with Glamorgan, after coming through their academy programme. In September 2021, Horton was named in England's under-19 squad to play in a six-match series against the West Indies. Three months later, Horton was selected in England's squad to play at the 2022 ICC Under-19 Cricket World Cup in the Caribbean. In England's first match of the tournament, against Bangladesh, Horton took six catches, with the team winning by seven wickets. In the Super League semi-final match against Afghanistan, Horton scored 53 not out from 36 balls to help England reach the final of the tournament, an innings that was described as "something special". In the final of the tournament, against India, Horton took a catch to dismiss Harnoor Singh. However, India went on to win the match and the tournament.

In June 2022, Horton was selected to make his first team debut for Glamorgan after their first choice wicket-keeper Chris Cooke was ruled out due to a calf injury. Horton was due to play against Gloucestershire on 18 June 2022 in their T20 Blast match. However, despite the toss taking place, the match was abandoned with no play taking place due to rain. The match was officially recorded as a no result, meaning that Horton made his Twenty20 debut despite no actual play being possible. The following day, in the T20 Blast match against the Sussex Sharks, Horton took part in the match, where he made his first dismissal with the stumping of Harrison Ward. Glamorgan went on to win the match by four wickets.
