= Tom Norton (cricketer) =

Welsh cricketer

Personal information
- Full name: Tom Owain Norton
- Born: 8 August 2007 (age 19); Abergavenny, Wales
- Batting: Right-handed
- Bowling: Right arm medium fast pace

Domestic team information
- Years: Team
- 2025–: Glamorgan
- First-class debut: 8 May 2026 Glamorgan v Somerset
- List A debut: 26 August 2025 Glamorgan v Leicestershire

Career statistics
Competition	FC	LA
Matches	4	1
Runs scored	54	–
Batting average	9.00	–
100s/50s	0/0	–/–
Top score	29	–
Balls bowled	677	60
Wickets	21	3
Bowling average	22.80	13.66
5 wickets in innings	1	0
10 wickets in match	0	0
Best bowling	5/50	3/41
Catches/stumpings	1/–	3/–
- Source: ESPNcricinfo, 24 June 2026

Tom Owain Norton (born 8 August 2007) is a Welsh cricketer who plays for Glamorgan. He is a right-handed batsman and right arm medium fast bowler. He took a hat-trick on his first-class cricket debut in May 2026 for Glamorgan against Somerset, the youngest ever player to take a hat-trick on first-class debut, at 18 years and 274 days old.

== Career ==
Born in Abergavenny, he attended King Henry School. Having been with Glamorgan since the age of 11 years-old, in 2024, Norton became the youngest player to represent Wales since 2007, at the age of 16 years and 348 days. He made his debut for Glamorgan in a one-day exhibition match against Wiltshire at the age of 16 years-old.

Norton made his List A cricket debut on 26 August 2025 against Leicestershire at Sophia Gardens, taking 3-41 with Pakistan captain Shan Masood his first county wicket, lbw for 18. He signed a two-year professional contract with Glamorgan that winter.

As an 18 year-old, Norton took a hat-trick on his first-class cricket debut on 9 May 2026 for Glamorgan in his third over of the second innings of opponents Somerset, dismissing top-order batsmen James Rew, Tom Lammonby and Archie Vaughan with successive balls, all for ducks, after opening the bowling. In doing so, he became the first player in 120 years to take a hat-trick on County Championship debut since Herbert Sedgwick in 1906. Norton also became the youngest ever player to take a hat-trick on first-class debut, at 18 years and 274 days old. He also became the youngest player to record a hat-trick for Glamorgan.
