= Chepstow School =

Comprehensive school in Monmouthshire, Wales

Chepstow School And Sixth Form Centre
- Ysgol Cas-gwent
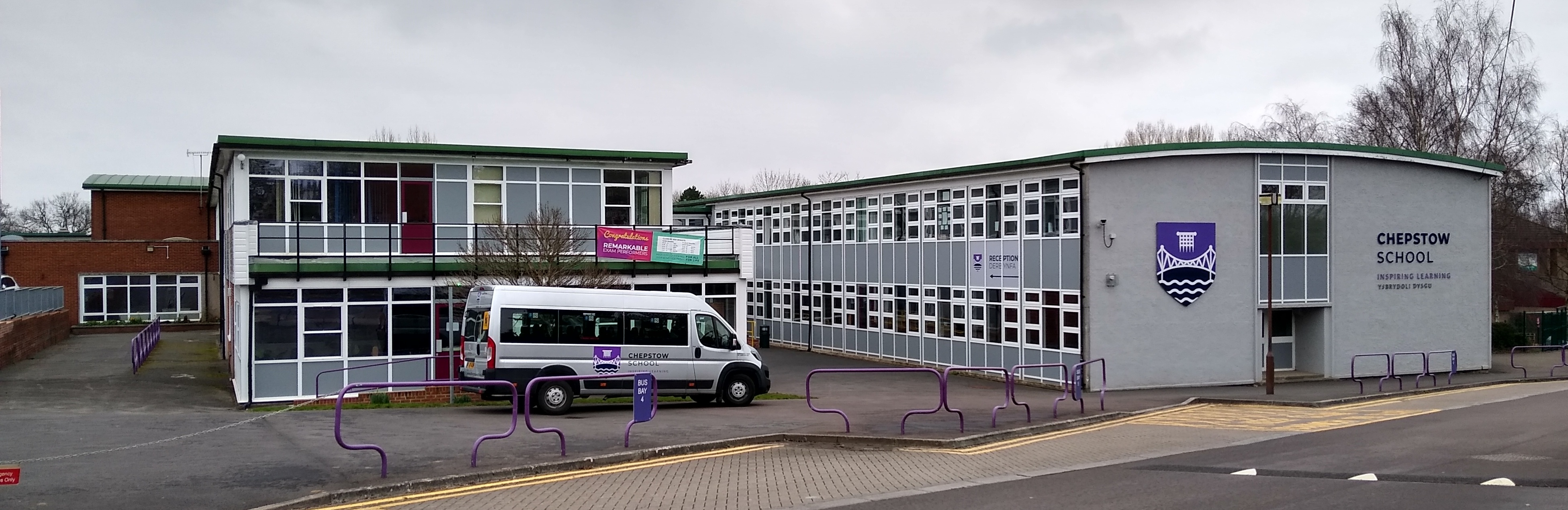

Location
- Welsh Street; Chepstow, Monmouthshire, NP16 5LR; Wales

Information
- Type: Comprehensive school
- Motto: Inspiring Learning
- Established: 1964; 62 years ago
- Local authority: Monmouthshire County Council
- Department for Education URN: 401862 Tables
- Chair of governors: Keith Dunn OBE
- Head teacher: Kelly Waythe
- Staff: 82 (2024)
- Gender: Co-educational
- Age: 11 to 18
- Enrolment: 772 (2021)
- Website: www.chepstowschool.net

Chepstow School and Sixth Form Centre (Welsh: Ysgol Cas-gwent) is a comprehensive school located in the town of Chepstow, Monmouthshire, Wales. The catchment area includes Chepstow and its surrounding villages.

== History of the school and its site ==
The school, located at Crossway Green, was opened in 1964 by Monmouthshire County Council as St Kingsmark School and Community College. At the time it was a Secondary Modern school with state of the art premises. In 1969 it merged with Larkfield Grammar School and both original schools ceased to exist. The new school set up on comprehensive principles was named Chepstow School. It operated on both sites for quite a number of years afterwards. This system was quite a common method of establishing comprehensive education at the time. The name "St Kingsmark" was derived from that of a medieval priory dedicated to St Cynfarch which existed close to the school, on what is now Kingsmark Lane. No traces of the priory now remain above ground. The badge chosen reflects the fact that two schools in Chepstow joined together (the Severn Bridge) and the portcullis badge is associated with the Beaufort family who had interests in Chepstow.

== Curriculum ==
As a state school, Chepstow School follows the National Curriculum. English, English Literature, Welsh, Mathematics and Science are required GCSE subjects while religious studies is a required non-exam course.

The school was linked to the OCR innovative science model since the introduction of the pilot scheme over 5 years ago. Since the introduction of the broadened curriculum, results have improved from 55% to 65% for the science core and 72% for Additional Science.

== Inspection ==
An Estyn inspection of the school in January 2012 reported both the school's performance, and its prospects for improvement, as "adequate". It reported that good features of the school's work include recent improvements in performance in key stage 4; many pupils making suitable progress in developing their knowledge, understanding and skills in lessons; pupils’ wellbeing, including behaviour, attendance, and the development of social and life skills; effective teaching in the majority of lessons; an inclusive ethos and a high level of care, support and guidance; and a wide range of extra-curricular activities, especially in sport and music. However, it also considered that performance at key stage 3 is weak; performance in English and mathematics at key stage 4 is below expectations; pupils’ literacy and numeracy skills are underdeveloped; and a few pupils, mainly the more able, do not make as much progress as they should. The school’s prospects for improvement were judged as adequate because leadership has been effective in making recent improvements in performance at key stage 4; there is a clear and accurate understanding of the school’s strengths and of the specific areas that need to be improved; appropriate self-evaluation procedures are in place and these link well to the improvement planning process; and governors provide a high standard of challenge and support. However, many of the processes were considered to be too new to have their planned impact; the co-ordination of skills provision is at an early stage; and the quality of middle managers varies too much.

== Facilities ==
The sports facilities include two rugby union pitches, one football (soccer) pitch, four tennis courts, an astro-turf all weather playing surface, and a swimming pool and indoor sports hall which is part of Chepstow Leisure Centre. The school campus is used for community education in the evenings.

The buildings are wheelchair-friendly and easily accessible for disabled students.

== Extracurricular activities ==
Students are encouraged to take part in various activities and be involved in the community. Work experience is available for Year 10 and 12 students. Students taking AS French spend a week of work experience in France.

=== Sport ===
The "5x60" programme works alongside the existing school sports system. The 5x60 clubs give students the opportunity to perform in physical activity for 60 minutes, 5 times a week. The clubs run during lunchtimes and after school. Through this programme, students have the opportunity to try non-traditional sports such as fencing and golf. Students George Sariak and Anna Stanley were awarded Youth Sport Trust Ambassador Status in 2012.

== Staff ==
Claire Price took over as head teacher in January 2012, following the retirement of John E. Barnbrook. She left the post in August 2018. Mike Coady was appointed as interim head from September 2018. Deputy headteacher Jo Lindley became acting head in January 2019.

Matthew Sims was appointed as the permanent Headteacher in January 2019 and took up the post in April 2019. Deputy headteacher Kelly Bowd became acting head in September 2022.

As of September 2023, it has been confirmed that Kelly Bowd was appointed Head Teacher who is now Kelly Waythe.
