= Ben Morris (cricketer) =

Welsh cricketer (born 2003)

Personal information
- Full name: Benjamin James Morris
- Born: 4 November 2003 (age 23); Abergavenny, Monmouthshire, Wales
- Batting: Right-handed
- Bowling: Right-arm medium

Domestic team information
- Years: Team
- 2023–2026: Glamorgan
- FC debut: 17 September 2024 Glamorgan v Yorkshire
- List A debut: 4 August 2023 Glamorgan v Worcestershire

Career statistics
Competition	FC	LA
Matches	1	5
Runs scored	7	12
Batting average	7.00	6.00
100s/50s	0/0	0/0
Top score	7*	10
Balls bowled	114	162
Wickets	1	3
Bowling average	92.00	60.66
5 wickets in innings	0	0
10 wickets in match	0	0
Best bowling	1/52	3/52
Catches/stumpings	0/–	3/–
- Source: Cricinfo, 23 August 2025

Benjamin James Morris (born 4 November 2003) is a Welsh cricketer who played for Glamorgan County Cricket Club. He is a right handed batsman and right arm medium pace bowler.

== Early life ==
Born in Monmouthshire, he featured for Wales Minor Counties in Minor Counties. He completed his schooling at King Henry VIII School at Abergavenny. In October 2022, he joined the Glamorgan 2nd XI team and signed a rookie contract.

== Career ==
He signed a professional contract with Glamorgan in February 2024. He made his List A debut against Worcestershire in One-Day Cup debut on 4 August 2023. He took his first List A wicket against Essex, and he took three wickets in that match. He made his first-class debut against Yorkshire in 2024 County Championship on 17 September 2024.
