= Zain-ul-Hassan =

Pakistani-born English cricketer

Personal information
- Born: 28 October 2000 (age 26); Islamabad, Pakistan
- Batting: Left-handed
- Bowling: Right-arm medium

Domestic team information
- Years: Team
- 2018: Worcestershire
- 2023-present: Glamorgan (squad no. 27)
- FC debut: 18 May 2023 Glamorgan v Sussex
- LA debut: 19 June 2018 Worcestershire v West Indies A

Career statistics
Competition	FC	LA	T20
Matches	39	16	3
Runs scored	1,524	300	14
Batting average	23.44	23.07	14.00
100s/50s	1/4	0/2	0/0
Top score	143	65	11
Balls bowled	3,883	648	54
Wickets	51	22	0
Bowling average	39.60	27.86	–
5 wickets in innings	1	0	–
10 wickets in match	0	0	–
Best bowling	5/14	4/25	–
Catches/stumpings	10/–	2/–	1/–
- Source: ESPNcricinfo, 27 September 2026

Zain-ul-Hassan (born 28 October 2000) is a Pakistani-born English cricketer who plays professional cricket in Wales. His family moved to England when he was seven years old. He made his List A debut for Worcestershire against the West Indies A in a tri-series warm-up match on 19 June 2018. After playing for the South Asian Cricket Academy, he joined Glamorgan ahead of the 2023 county season.
