= Andy Gorvin =

English cricketer (born 1997)

Personal information
- Full name: Andrew William Gorvin
- Born: 14 May 1997 (age 29); Winchester, Hampshire, England
- Batting: Right-handed
- Bowling: Right-arm fast-medium
- Role: Bowler

Domestic team information
- Years: Team
- 2021–present: Glamorgan (squad no. 11)
- First-class debut: 5 May 2022 Glamorgan v Leicestershire
- List A debut: 25 July 2021 Glamorgan v Northamptonshire

Career statistics
Competition	FC	LA	T20
Matches	26	36	26
Runs scored	460	177	100
Batting average	14.83	12.64	16.66
100s/50s	0/1	0/0	0/0
Top score	50*	25*	14*
Balls bowled	3,463	1,544	463
Wickets	66	39	23
Bowling average	27.74	38.02	29.13
5 wickets in innings	2	1	0
10 wickets in match	0	0	0
Best bowling	5/40	5/56	4/17
Catches/stumpings	11/–	12/–	11/–
- Source: Cricinfo, 4 September 2026

Andrew William Gorvin (born 14 May 1997) is an English cricketer.

== Career ==
Gorvin attended Portsmouth Grammar School and was part of the Hampshire academy and played club cricket for Hayling Island CC and Havant, even acting as stand in captain for Havant before relocating to attend Cardiff University. He played a lead role in St Fagans winning the ECB South Wales Premier League title in 2019 and 2021. He also played for Wales in the National Counties Championship and One Day Trophy, as they reached the Semi Finals in 2021. He took 3-35 for Cardiff University against Glamorgan in March 2021.

He made his List A debut on 25 July 2021, for Glamorgan in the 2021 Royal London One-Day Cup. He made his first-class debut on 5 May 2022, for Glamorgan in the 2022 County Championship.
