= Will Smale =

Welsh cricketer (born 2001)

William Smale
Personal information
- Full name: William Timothy Edward Smale
- Born: 28 February 2001 (age 25); Newport, Wales
- Batting: Right-handed
- Role: Wicket-keeper
- Relatives: Sophia Smale (sister)

Domestic team information
- Years: Team
- 2019–2020: North West Warriors
- 2023–present: Glamorgan
- First-class debut: 12 August 2019; NW Warriors v Leinster Lightning
- List A debut: 26 August 2019; NW Warriors v Northern Knights

Career statistics
Competition	FC	LA	T20
Matches	3	25	40
Runs scored	42	574	881
Batting average	14.00	24.95	22.58
100s/50s	0/0	1/1	0/5
Top score	41	105*	65
Catches/stumpings	10/0	31/0	26/0
- Source: Cricinfo, 5 August 2026

William Timothy Edward Smale (born 28 February 2001) is a Welsh cricketer. He made his first-class debut for North West Warriors in the 2019 Inter-Provincial Championship on 12 August 2019 in Ireland. Prior to his first-class debut, he played for the Ireland under-19 cricket team in the Division 1 Europe Qualifier of the 2020 Under-19 Cricket World Cup qualification tournament. He was the leading run-scorer for the team in the tournament, with 185 runs in five matches.

He made his List A debut for North West Warriors in the 2019 Inter-Provincial Cup in Ireland on 26 August 2019. During the winter of 2019, Smale played club cricket for Sydney Cricket Club in Australia. He made his Twenty20 debut for North West Warriors in the 2020 Inter-Provincial Trophy on 20 August 2020.

In October 2023 he signed a professional contract with Glamorgan. On 23 September 2024, Smale scored 28 runs off 14 balls as Glamorgan won the One-Day Cup final against Somerset at Trent Bridge.
