= Dan Douthwaite =

English cricketer (born 1997)

Personal information
- Full name: Daniel Alexander Douthwaite
- Born: 8 February 1997 (age 29); Kingston upon Thames, London, England
- Batting: Right-handed
- Bowling: Right-arm medium-fast

Domestic team information
- Years: Team
- 2018: Warwickshire
- 2019: Cardiff MCCU
- 2019–present: Glamorgan
- 2021: Manchester Originals
- 2023: Welsh Fire
- First-class debut: 26 March 2019; Cardiff MCCU v Somerset
- List A debut: 17 June 2018; Warwickshire v West Indies A

Career statistics
Competition	FC	LA	T20
Matches	41	39	87
Runs scored	1,489	612	943
Batting average	26.58	22.66	17.79
100s/50s	1/7	0/3	0/4
Top score	100*	61	56
Balls bowled	4,262	1,613	1,533
Wickets	74	53	90
Bowling average	42.13	30.92	26.27
5 wickets in innings	0	0	0
10 wickets in match	0	0	0
Best bowling	4/48	4/25	4/22
Catches/stumpings	14/–	14/–	22/–
- Source: Cricinfo, 27 September 2026

Daniel Alexander Douthwaite (born 8 February 1997) is an English cricketer who plays for Glamorgan.

Born in Kingston upon Thames, Douthwaite attended Reed's School in Cobham, Surrey, then went on to Cardiff Metropolitan University, where he earned a degree in Sports Management.

He made his List A debut for Warwickshire against the West Indies A team in a tri-series warm-up match on 17 June 2018. He made his Twenty20 debut for the Marylebone Cricket Club in the 2018 MCC Tri-Nation Series against the Netherlands on 29 July 2018. He made his first-class debut on 26 March 2019, for Cardiff MCCU against Somerset, as part of the Marylebone Cricket Club University fixtures.

On 23 April 2019, he was signed by Glamorgan. Prior to being signed by Glamorgan, Douthwaite had scored his maiden century in first-class cricket, with 100 not out from 107 balls for Cardiff MCCU against Sussex.

Douthwaite signed a two-year contract extension with Glamorgan in September 2024. He agreed a further two-year deal with the club in October 2026.
