= Finlay Bean =

English cricketer (born 2002)

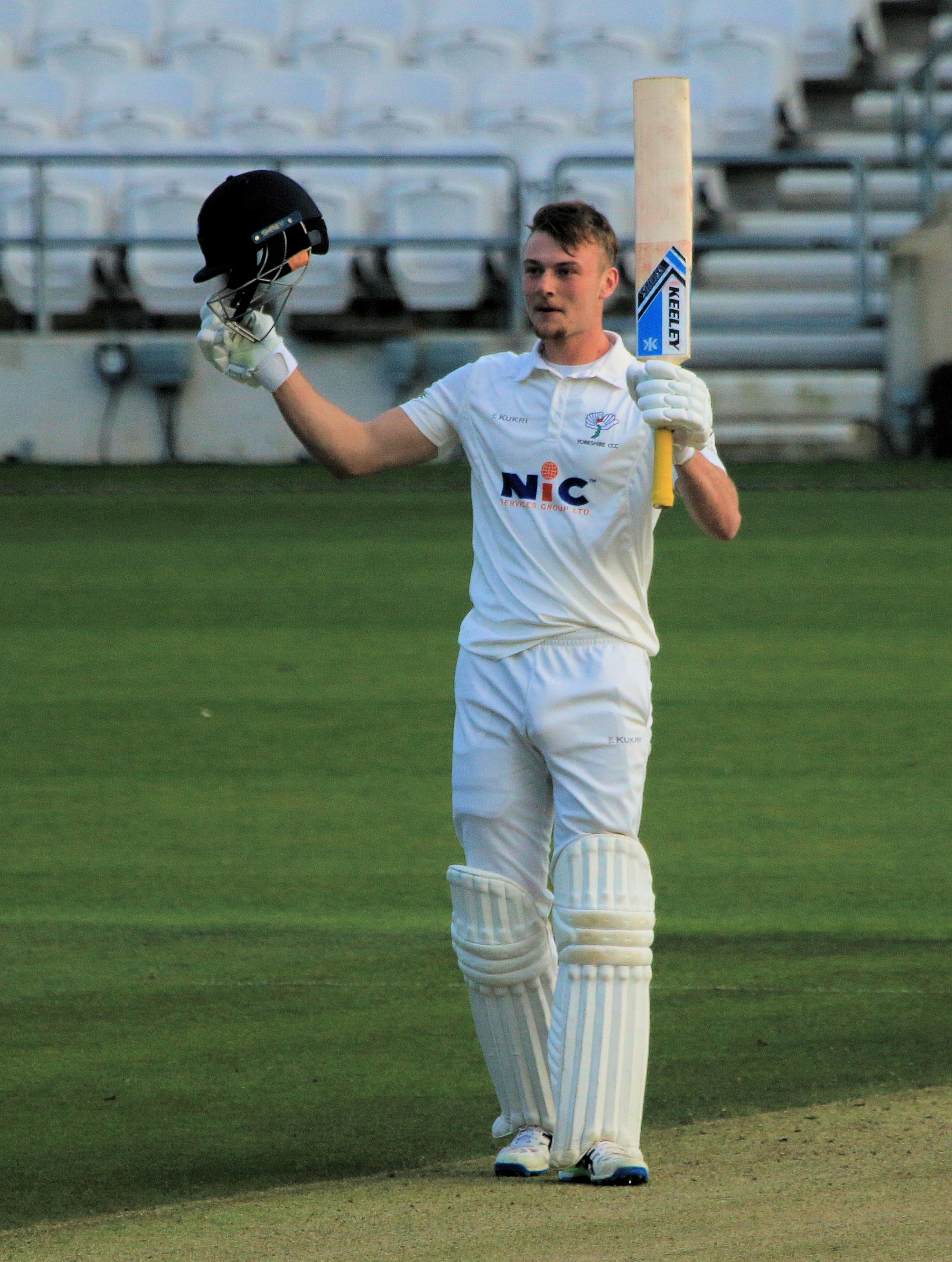
- Bean celebrates after scoring his maiden FC century (2023)

Personal information
- Full name: Finlay Joseph Bean
- Born: 16 April 2002 (age 24); Harrogate, North Yorkshire, England
- Batting: Left-handed
- Role: Batsman, wicket-keeper

Domestic team information
- Years: Team
- 2022–2026: Yorkshire (squad no. 33)
- 2027–: Northamptonshire
- FC debut: 5 September 2022 Yorkshire v Lancashire
- LA debut: 19 August 2022 Yorkshire v Kent

Career statistics
Competition	FC	LA
Matches	48	30
Runs scored	2,649	517
Batting average	33.53	21.54
100s/50s	7/6	1/1
Top score	224	102*
Balls bowled	66	–
Wickets	0	–
Bowling average	–	–
5 wickets in innings	–	–
10 wickets in match	–	–
Best bowling	–	–
Catches/stumpings	59/0	30/1
- Source: ESPNcricinfo, 4 September 2026

Finlay Joseph Bean (born 16 April 2002) is an English cricketer who plays for Northamptonshire County Cricket Club. A left-handed batsman and wicket-keeper, he started his professional career at Yorkshire.

== Early life ==
Bean was born in Harrogate, North Yorkshire, England. He was educated at Ripon Grammar School and Queen Ethelburga's College, York.

== Career ==
Playing for Yorkshire second-XI in June 2022, Bean scored a record 441 runs against Nottinghamshire second-XI. It was the highest individual score ever recorded in the Second-XI Championship, beating the previous highest mark of 322 scored by Marcus Trescothick for Somerset against Warwickshire at Taunton in 1997. Following this score Bean was given a contract with Yorkshire until the end of the 2023 season. He scored 61 on his List-A debut for Yorkshire against Kent in the Royal London Cup on 19 August 2022. Bean made his first-class debut for Yorkshire on 5 September 2022 against Lancashire County Cricket Club at Old Trafford. He was praised for the assertiveness of his defensive shots as well as the fluidity of his attacking shots. Bean struck his maiden first-class century on the opening day of the 2023 county cricket season, scoring 118 from 149 balls against Leicestershire at Headingley on 6 April 2023.

On 11 July 2023 Bean hit a new career high score of 135 against Worcestershire. On the same day, it was announced he had signed a new two-year contract with the county cricket club.

In May 2024, he hit a new best first-class score, scoring 173 against Glamorgan at Headingley.

Bean made his maiden first-class double century against Nottinghamshire at Trent Bridge on 24 June 2025, scoring 224.

In March 2026, he signed a two-year contract extension keeping him tied into Yorkshire until at least the end of the 2028 season. However, on 3 November 2026, it was announced that Bean had left Yorkshire to join Northamptonshire on a three-year contract.
