= Chris Cooke =

South African born English cricketer (born 1986)

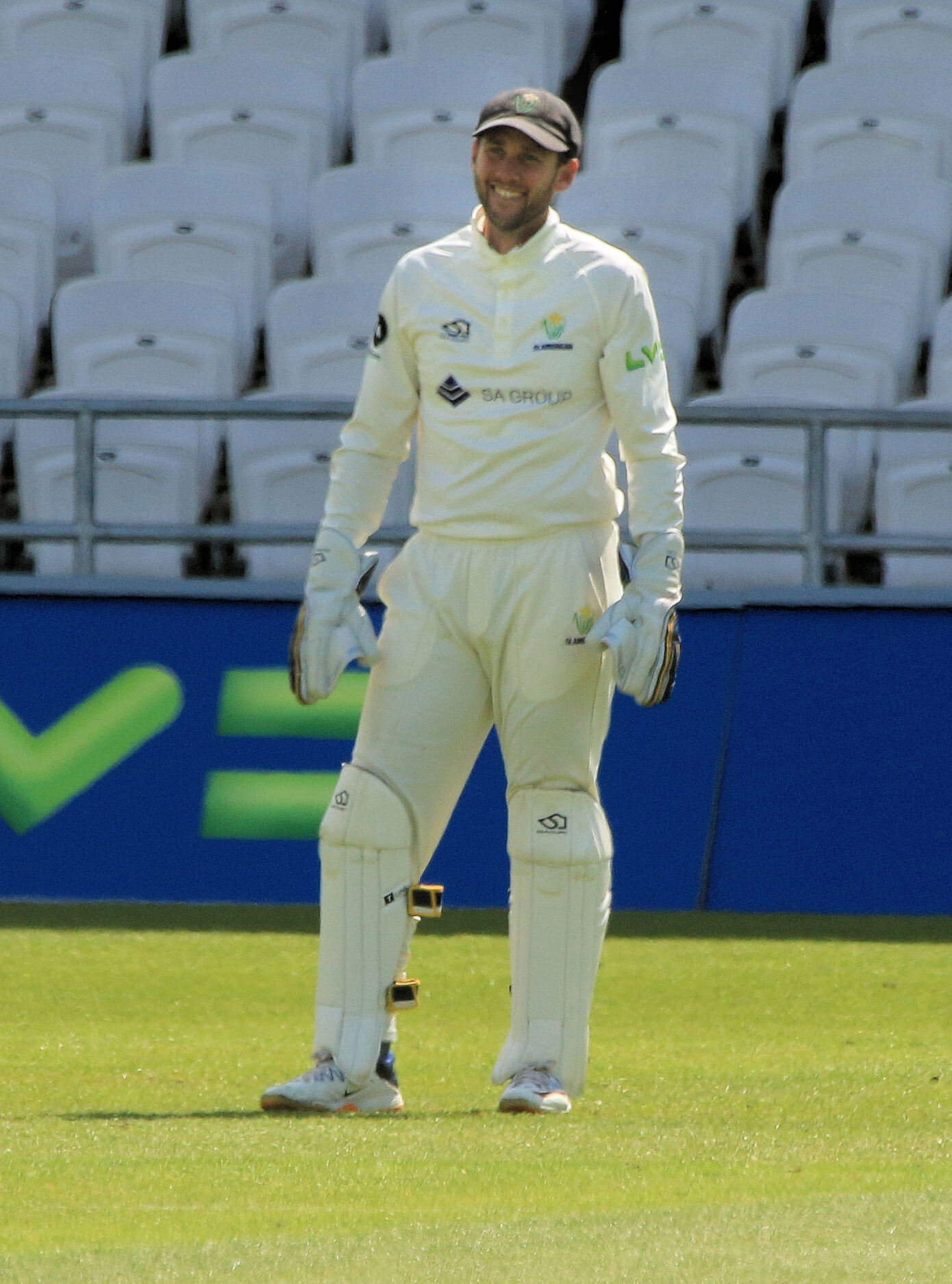
- Cooke in 2023

Personal information
- Full name: Christopher Barry Cooke
- Born: May 30, 1986 (age 40); Johannesburg, Transvaal Province, South Africa
- Batting: Right-handed
- Role: Wicket-keeper

Domestic team information
- Years: Team
- 2008–2010: Western Province
- 2011–2026: Glamorgan (squad no. 46)
- 2021: Birmingham Phoenix
- 2023–2024: Welsh Fire
- First-class debut: 29 October 2009; Western Province v Border
- List A debut: 18 January 2009; Western Province v Northerns

Career statistics
Competition	FC	LA	T20
Matches	172	92	184
Runs scored	8,907	2,616	3,004
Batting average	37.74	34.88	22.75
100s/50s	15/47	3/14	1/7
Top score	205*	161	113*
Catches/stumpings	390/23	58/5	108/19
- Source: ESPNcricinfo, 27 September 2026

Christopher Barry Cooke (born 30 May 1986) is a South African cricketer who plays as a right-handed batsman and wicket-keeper. Born in Johannesburg, he has played for Western Province and Glamorgan. He was Glamorgan captain for three seasons until stepping down in December 2021.

In September 2021, in the final round of the 2021 County Championship, Cooke scored his maiden double century in first-class cricket, with an unbeaten 205 runs.

On 18 August 2026, Cooke announced he would retire from professional cricket at the end of that year's county season.
