= Kiran Carlson =

Welsh cricketer (born 1998)

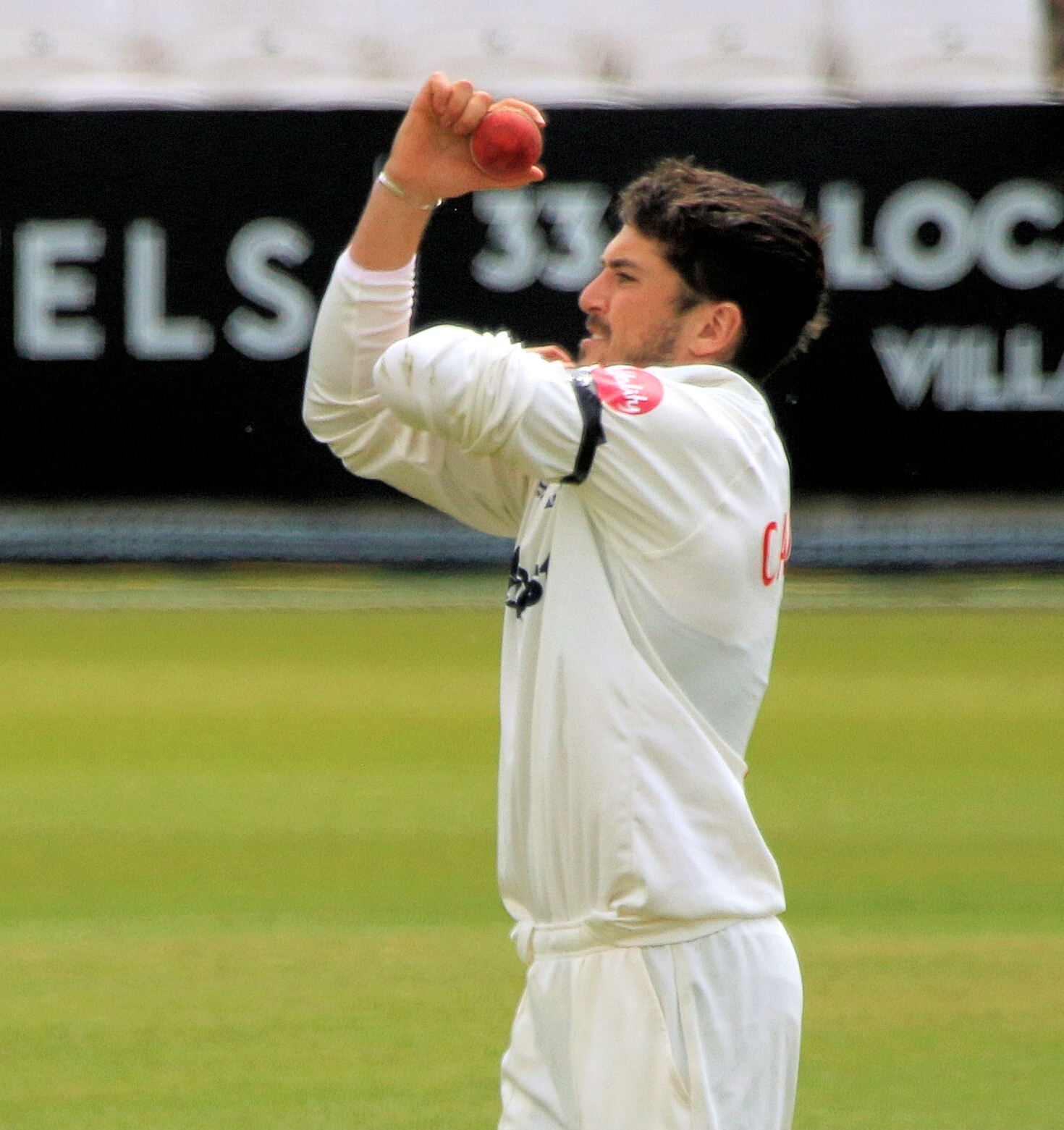
- Carlson in 2024

Personal information
- Full name: Kiran Shah Carlson
- Born: May 16, 1998 (age 28); Cardiff, Wales
- Batting: Right-handed
- Bowling: Right-arm off break
- Role: Middle order batsman

Domestic team information
- Years: Team
- 2016–present: Glamorgan (squad no. 5)
- 2022/23: Mid West Rhinos
- 2026: London Spirit
- First-class debut: 31 August 2016; Glamorgan v Northamptonshire
- List A debut: 15 July 2016; Glamorgan v Pakistan A

Career statistics
Competition	FC	LA	T20
Matches	122	63	100
Runs scored	7,252	1,614	2,159
Batting average	36.44	27.82	23.72
100s/50s	17/39	1/11	2/7
Top score	209	135	135
Balls bowled	3,874	812	33
Wickets	47	20	2
Bowling average	50.34	40.55	30.50
5 wickets in innings	1	0	0
10 wickets in match	0	0	0
Best bowling	5/28	4/41	2/13
Catches/stumpings	69/–	28/–	40/–
- Source: CricketArchive, 27 September 2026

Kiran Shah Carlson (born 16 May 1998) is a Welsh cricketer who plays for Glamorgan County Cricket Club. He is a right-handed middle order batsman and occasional off-break bowler. In September 2016 during a 2016 County Championship match against Essex, Carlson became the youngest player for Glamorgan to score a first-class century.

== Career ==
Carlson played his youth cricket at Cardiff Cricket Club. He made his first class debut on 31 August 2016 against Northamptonshire, having been brought to the team as an injury replacement for Craig Meschede. He made his Twenty20 debut for Glamorgan in the 2017 NatWest t20 Blast on 7 July 2017.

In 2021 Carlson captained Glamorgan to victory in the final of the Royal London One-Day Cup, top-scoring in Glamorgan's innings with 82.

Having led Glamorgan in limited overs competition for four years, Carlson was named club captain in January 2026.

== Personal life ==
Carlson was educated at Whitchurch High School in Cardiff and obtained three A-grades in his A Levels. He completed a business degree at Cardiff University in 2021.
