= Glamorgan County Cricket Club =

Cricket club in Wales

- One Day name: Glamorgan

Personnel
- Captain: Kiran Carlson
- One Day captain: Andy Gorvin (LA)
- Coach: TBA

Team information
- Founded: 1888
- Home ground: Sophia Gardens
- Capacity: 16,000

History
- First-class debut: Sussex in 1921 at Cardiff Arms Park
- County Championship wins: 3
- One-Day Cup wins: 5
- Twenty20 Cup/FPt20 wins: 0
- Official website: www.glamorgancricket.com
First-class
One-day
T20

Glamorgan County Cricket Club (Welsh: Criced Morgannwg) is one of eighteen first-class county clubs within the domestic cricket structure of England and Wales. It represents the historic county of Glamorgan (Welsh: Morgannwg). Founded in 1888, Glamorgan held minor status at first and was a prominent member of the early Minor Counties Championship before the First World War. In 1921, the club joined the County Championship and the team was elevated to first-class status, subsequently playing in every top-level domestic cricket competition in England and Wales.

Glamorgan is the only Welsh first-class cricket club. They have won the English County Championship competition in 1948, 1969 and 1997. Glamorgan have also beaten international teams from all of the Test playing nations, including Australia whom they defeated in successive tours in 1964 and 1968. The club's limited overs team is called simply Glamorgan. Kit colours are blue and yellow for limited overs matches.

The club is based in Cardiff and plays most of its home games at Sophia Gardens, which is located on the bank of the River Taff. Some First XI matches are also played at The Gnoll in Neath. Matches have also occasionally been played at Swansea, Rhos on Sea and Cresselly (despite the latter towns being in Conwy and Pembrokeshire respectively).

== Honours ==
=== First XI honours ===
- County Championship (3) – 1948, 1969, 1997
- Sunday/National League/One Day Cup (5) – 1993, 2002, 2004, 2021, 2024
- County Championship Division Two Promoted - 2000, 2004, 2025
- Minor Counties Championship (0)
  - Shared (1): 1900

=== Second XI honours ===
- Second XI Championship (2) – 1965, 1980
- Second XI Twenty20 (2) – 2019, 2022

== Earliest cricket ==
Cricket probably reached Wales and Glamorgan by the end of the 17th century. The earliest known reference to cricket in Glamorgan is a 1771 newspaper report about noise levels at matches in Swansea.

== Origin of club ==
The formation of Glamorgan CCC took place on 6 July 1888 at a meeting in the Angel Hotel, Cardiff.

The club competed in the Minor Counties Championship for many years and then applied for first-class status after the First World War.

Glamorgan CCC played its initial first-class match versus Sussex CCC at Cardiff Arms Park on 18–20 May 1921 and thus increased the County Championship to 17 teams. Captained by N.V.H. Riches, Glamorgan won this first match by 23 runs. Only one more victory was achieved that summer; Glamorgan lost 14 games and finished with the wooden spoon.

== Club history ==
Glamorgan won the county championship in 1948 under the captaincy of Wilf Wooller, whose advocacy of high fielding standards was the key to beating stronger batting and bowling teams.

Glamorgan was the unintentional venue for a piece of cricket history on 31 August 1968 when, during Glamorgan v Notts at Swansea, Gary Sobers hit all six balls in an over from Malcolm Nash for six.

Glamorgan won the championship again under Tony Lewis in 1969 and Matthew Maynard in 1997. Lewis is the only Glamorgan player to captain England in Tests, when he became the first Glamorgan cricketer to lead an England tour abroad to play series against India and Pakistan in 1972–73. Maynard, who retired at the end of the 2005 season, was one of the most successful batsmen in first class cricket over the previous 20 years. The 2005 captain, off spinner Robert Croft, proved effective on England tours, and was a useful pinch hitter in List A one-day games.

On 20 April 2006, the ECB announced that Glamorgan Cricket had been granted the right to host an Ashes Test against Australia in 2009.

The following month, Cardiff Council’s Planning Committee approved Glamorgan’s plans for the stadium redevelopment, and during the summer, demolition work began at Sophia Gardens.

In mid-September, the old pavilion was used for the final time during Glamorgan’s Championship match against Gloucestershire. By January 2007, construction had begun on the new pavilion complex, the new grandstand on the site of the former pavilion, and the Media Centre complex at the Cathedral Road end.

Building work continued throughout the summer of 2007, during which Glamorgan staged a number of home matches away from Cardiff.

The contractors, Carillion, handed the new stadium over to Glamorgan Cricket on 17 March 2008, and on 9 May, the Welsh county played their inaugural match in the completed stadium — a day‑night fixture against Gloucestershire.

Sophia Gardens became a Test cricket venue in 2009 when the First Test in the Ashes series against Australia was played there.

In 2021 Glamorgan won their first trophy for seventeen years, defeating Durham by 58 runs in the final of the Royal London One-Day Cup. They followed this up with a victory in the same competition in 2024, winning a shortened 20-overs-a-side game against Somerset by 15 runs.

Glamorgan were promoted into Division One of the County Championship in 2025 after finishing runners-up in Division Two.

== Players ==
=== Current squad ===
- No. denotes the player's squad number, as worn on the back of their shirt.
- ‡ denotes players with international caps.
- * denotes a player who has been awarded a county cap.

No.	Name	Nationality	Birth date	Batting style	Bowling style	Notes
Batters
5	Kiran Carlson*	Wales	16 May 1998 (age 28)	Right-handed	Right-arm off break	Club Captain
17	Callum Nicholls	Wales	30 July 2004 (age 22)	Right-handed	Right-arm medium	
23	Jack Hope-Bell	Wales	13 July 2007 (age 19)	Right-handed	Right-arm off break	
58	Sean Dickson	South Africa	2 September 1991 (age 35)	Right-handed	Right-arm medium	UK passport
55	Asa Tribe ‡	Jersey	29 March 2004 (age 22)	Right-handed	Right-arm off break	
97	Eddie Byrom	Zimbabwe	17 June 1997 (age 29)	Left-handed	Right-arm leg break	Irish passport
All-rounders
8	Ben Kellaway	Wales	5 January 2004 (age 22)	Right-handed	Right-arm off break Slow left-arm orthodox	
27	Zain-ul-Hassan	England	28 October 2000 (age 26)	Left-handed	Right-arm fast-medium	
88	Dan Douthwaite	England	8 February 1997 (age 29)	Right-handed	Right-arm fast-medium	
—	Ben Mike	England	24 August 1998 (age 28)	Right-handed	Right-arm fast-medium	
Wicket-keepers
6	Henry Hurle	Wales	11 November 2004 (age 21)	Right-handed	—	
28	Will Smale	Wales	28 February 2001 (age 25)	Right-handed	—	
37	Alex Horton	Wales	7 January 2004 (age 22)	Right-handed	—	
81	Harry Wallace	Wales	30 October 2008 (age 18)	Left-handed	—	
Bowlers
3	Mason Crane* ‡	England	18 February 1997 (age 29)	Right-handed	Right-arm leg break	England development contract
11	Andy Gorvin	England	10 May 1997 (age 29)	Right-handed	Right-arm fast-medium	Captain (LA)
12	Tom Norton	Wales	8 August 2007 (age 19)	Right-handed	Right-arm fast-medium	
16	Connor O'Riordan	Australia	16 April 2002 (age 24)	Left-handed	Right-arm fast-medium	UK passport
22	Ned Leonard	England	15 August 2002 (age 24)	Right-handed	Right-arm fast-medium	
24	Tom Edwards	Wales	11 July 2008 (age 18)	Right-handed	Right-arm fast-medium	
35	Jamie McIlroy	England	19 June 1994 (age 32)	Right-handed	Left-arm fast-medium	
64	Timm van der Gugten* ‡	Netherlands	25 February 1991 (age 35)	Right-handed	Right-arm fast-medium	
77	Romano Franco	England	16 March 2007 (age 19)	Left-handed	Slow left-arm orthodox	
—	Joseph Davies	Wales	1 July 2005 (age 21)	Right-handed	Left-arm fast-medium	
Source: Updated: 27 September 2026

== Records ==
Over 16,000 First Class Runs For Glamorgan

Player	Runs
Alan Jones	34,056
Emrys Davies	26,102
Matthew Maynard	22,764
Gilbert Parkhouse	22,619
Hugh Morris	18,520
Arnold Dyson	17,920
Bernard Hedges	17,733
Allan Watkins	17,419
Peter Walker	16,510

Most first-class wickets for Glamorgan
Qualification – 800 wickets

Player	Wickets
Don Shepherd	2,174
Jack Mercer	1,460
Johnnie Clay	1,292
Robert Croft	1,032
Malcolm Nash	991
Frank Ryan	913
Wilf Wooller	887
Emrys Davies	885
Steve Watkin	861

Team totals

- Highest total for: 795/5d v. Leicestershire, Leicester, 2022
- Highest total against: 750 by Northamptonshire, Cardiff, 2019
- Lowest total for: 22 v. Lancashire, Liverpool, 1924
- Lowest total against: 33 by Leicestershire, Ebbw Vale, 1965

Batting

- Highest score: 410* Sam Northeast, Leicester, 2022

Best partnership for each wicket

Wkt	Score	Batsmen	Against	Location	Year
1st	374	Matthew Elliott and Steve James	Sussex	Colwyn Bay	2000
2nd	328	Eddie Byrom and Colin Ingram	Sussex	Cardiff	2022
3rd	313	Emrys Davies and Willie Jones	Essex	Brentwood	1948
4th	425*	Adrian Dale and Viv Richards	Middlesex	Sophia Gardens	1993
5th	307	Kiran Carlson and Chris Cooke	Northamptonshire	Sophia Gardens	2021
6th	461*	Sam Northeast and Chris Cooke	Leicestershire	Grace Road	2022
7th	211	Tony Cottey and Ottis Gibson	Leicestershire	Swansea	1996
8th	202	Dai Davies and Joe Hills	Sussex	Eastbourne	1928
9th	203*	Joe Hills and Johnnie Clay	Worcestershire	Swansea	1929
10th	143	Terry Davies and Simon Daniels	Gloucestershire	Swansea	1982

Bowling

- Best bowling: 10/51 J. Mercer v. Worcestershire, Worcester, 1936
- Best match bowling: 17/212 J. C. Clay v. Worcestershire, Swansea, 1937

== Lists of players and club captains ==
- List of Glamorgan CCC players
- List of Glamorgan cricket captains
