= 2026 County Championship =

Cricket tournament

- Dates: 3 April – 27 September 2026
- Administrator: England and Wales Cricket Board
- Cricket format: First-class cricket (4 days)
- Tournament format: League system
- Champions: Warwickshire (9th title)
- Participants: 18
- Matches: 126
- Most runs: Joe Clarke, Nottinghamshire (1,288) (Note: Division 1); Ricardo Vasconcelos, Northamptonshire (1,159) (Note: Division 2)
- Most wickets: Ethan Bamber, Warwickshire (69); Matthew Potts, Durham (60)

The 2026 County Championship, known for sponsorship reasons as the Rothesay County Championship 2026, was the 126th cricket County Championship season in England and Wales. As in 2025, Division One had ten teams and Division Two had eight teams. The season began on 3 April and ended on 27 September 2026. Nottinghamshire were the defending champions. Warwickshire won the title for the ninth time in the club's history.

== Teams ==
The teams were split based on the finishing positions in the 2025 season. The following teams will take part in the County Championship.

=== Division One teams ===
Team	Primary home ground	Captain	Coach
Essex	County Ground, Chelmsford	Tom Westley	Chris Silverwood
Glamorgan	Sophia Gardens, Cardiff	Kiran Carlson	Richard Dawson
Hampshire	Rose Bowl, Southampton	Ben Brown	Russell Domingo
Leicestershire	Grace Road, Leicester	Ian Holland	Alfonso Thomas
Nottinghamshire	Trent Bridge, Nottingham	Haseeb Hameed	Peter Moores
Somerset	County Ground, Taunton	Lewis Gregory	Jason Kerr
Surrey	The Oval, London	Rory Burns	Gareth Batty
Sussex	County Ground, Hove	Ollie Robinson	Paul Farbrace
Warwickshire	Edgbaston, Birmingham	Ed Barnard	Ian Westwood
Yorkshire	Headingley, Leeds	Jonny Bairstow	Anthony McGrath

Team promoted from Division Two in 2025

=== Division Two teams ===
Team	Primary home ground	Captain	Coach
Derbyshire	County Ground, Derby	Wayne Madsen	Mickey Arthur
Durham	Riverside Ground, Chester-le-Street	Alex Lees	Ryan Campbell
Gloucestershire	County Ground, Bristol	Cameron Bancroft	Mark Alleyne
Kent	St Lawrence Ground, Canterbury	Daniel Bell-Drummond	Adam Hollioake
Lancashire	Old Trafford, Manchester	James Anderson	Steven Croft
Middlesex	Lord's, London	Leus du Plooy	Peter Fulton
Northamptonshire	County Ground, Northampton	Luke Procter	Darren Lehmann
Worcestershire	New Road, Worcester	Brett D'Oliveira	Alan Richardson

Team relegated from Division One in 2025

== Standings ==
=== Division One ===
Pos	Team	Pld	W	L	T	D	A	Bat	Bowl	Ded	Pts	
1	Warwickshire (C)	14	7	1	0	6	0	24	41	0	225	Champions
2	Somerset	14	6	3	0	5	0	28	41	0	205	
3	Sussex	14	7	3	0	4	0	24	39	12	195	
4	Nottinghamshire	14	5	3	0	6	0	25	39	0	192	
5	Yorkshire	14	6	4	0	4	0	16	36	0	180	
6	Glamorgan	14	4	5	0	5	0	16	39	0	159	
7	Surrey	14	2	4	0	8	0	23	33	0	152	
8	Essex	14	4	7	0	3	0	13	35	0	136	
9	Leicestershire (R)	14	3	7	0	4	0	20	38	27	111	Relegation to Division 2
10	Hampshire (R)	14	2	9	0	3	0	4	38	0	98	Relegation to Division 2

Source: ESPNcricinfoBBC Sport
- Sussex were deducted 12 points after agreeing to a financial support package from the England and Wales Cricket Board (ECB).
- Leicestershire were deducted 27 points for a breach of ECB pitch regulations in their game against Glamorgan in August.

=== Division Two ===
Pos	Team	Pld	W	L	T	D	A	Bat	Bowl	Ded	Pts	
1	Durham (P)	14	9	0	0	5	0	37	37	0	258	Promotion to Division 1
2	Kent (P)	14	8	2	0	4	0	19	37	5	211	Promotion to Division 1
3	Northamptonshire	14	5	4	0	5	0	32	39	0	191	
4	Middlesex	14	5	5	0	4	0	15	40	0	167	
5	Worcestershire	14	5	5	0	4	0	20	36	2	166	
6	Derbyshire	14	4	7	0	3	0	27	35	0	150	
7	Lancashire	14	2	8	0	4	0	11	39	0	114	
8	Gloucestershire	14	3	10	0	1	0	1	36	2	91	

Source: ESPNcricinfoBBC Sport

== Division One fixtures ==
=== April ===
3–6 April 2026
Scorecard

Surrey	v	Warwickshire (H)
328 (95.1 overs); Ben Foakes 128 (199); Ethan Bamber 3/59 (19 overs)		544 (128.3 overs); Dan Mousley 144 (178); Ralphie Albert 3/80 (20.3 overs)
447/4d (124 overs); Dan Lawrence 161* (258); Jordan Thompson 1/53 (17 overs)

Match drawn
Edgbaston, Birmingham
Umpires: James Middlebrook and Steve O'Shaughnessy

- Warwickshire won the toss and elected to field.
- Points: Warwickshire 16, Surrey 11

3–5 April 2026
Scorecard

Essex	v	Hampshire (H)
461/7d (138.3 overs); Matt Critchley 173 (266); Sonny Baker 2/68 (22 overs)		156 (48.3 overs); Kyle Abbott 35 (43); Sam Cook 3/33 (11 overs)
		168 (59.3 overs) (f/o); Tom Prest 55 (67); Matt Critchley 5/9 (4.3 overs)

Essex won by an innings and 137 runs
The Rose Bowl, Southampton
Umpires: Ian Blackwell and Mike Burns

- Hampshire won the toss and elected field.
- Ben Mayes (Hampshire) made his first-class debut.
- Noah Thain replaced Tom Westley as an injury substitute for Essex.
- Points: Essex 22, Hampshire 2

3–6 April 2026
Scorecard

Glamorgan (H)	v	Yorkshire
302 (120.3 overs); Colin Ingram 103 (226); Jack White 3/40 (20 overs)		226 (60.2 overs); Matthew Revis 50 (79); Mason Crane 5/55 (16.2 overs)
218/5d (72.5 overs); Colin Ingram 75 (136); Dom Bess 4/87 (30.5 overs)		239/7 (67.4 overs); Adam Lyth 97 (150); Ryan Hadley 3/35 (14.4 overs)

Match drawn
Sophia Gardens, Cardiff
Umpires: Nigel Llong and Russell Warren

- Yorkshire won the toss and elected to field.
- No play was possible before lunch and only 36 overs of play was possible on day 1 due to rain and wet outfield.
- Will Luxton replaced Jonny Bairstow as an injury substitute for Yorkshire.
- Points: Glamorgan 12, Yorkshire 10

3–6 April 2026
Scorecard

Sussex	v	Leicestershire (H)
361 (89.5 overs); Tom Clark 101 (164); Ben Green 3/54 (21.5 overs)		245 (65 overs); Jake Weatherald 83 (107); Henry Crocombe 5/33 (12 overs)
364 (92.5 overs); Jack Carson 85 (140); Rehan Ahmed 3/61 (17.5 overs)		258 (78.1 overs); Ben Cox 60 (100); Henry Crocombe 4/36 (9.1 overs)

Sussex won by 222 runs
Grace Road, Leicester
Umpires: Michael Gough and Rob White

- Leicestershire won the toss and elected to field.
- Ian Holland (Leicestershire) took his 150th wicket in first-class cricket.
- Points: Sussex 22, Leicestershire 3

3–6 April 2026
Scorecard

Somerset (H)	v	Nottinghamshire
347 (103.5 overs); Tom Abell 108 (186); Dillon Pennington 5/65 (26.5 overs)		338 (103.2 overs); Joe Clarke 92 (176); Migael Pretorius 4/65 (25 overs)
407/5d (88 overs); James Rew 122 (184); Dillon Pennington 4/175 (35 overs)		140/3 (45 overs); Ben Slater 60 (103); Jack Leach 2/26 (19 overs)

Match drawn
County Ground, Taunton
Umpires: Graham Lloyd and Paul Pollard

- Nottinghamshire won the toss and elected to field.
- Points: Somerset 13, Nottinghamshire 13

10–12 April 2026
Scorecard

Essex (H)	v	Somerset
149 (51 overs); Charlie Allison 49 (84); Josh Shaw 3/30 (11 overs)		348 (92.3 overs); Craig Overton 141* (180); Shane Snater 3/56 (18.3 overs)
245 (72.3 overs); Paul Walter 70 (118); Migael Pretorius 3/64 (19.3 overs)		49/0 (5.4 overs); Archie Vaughan 41* (25)

Somerset won by 10 wickets
County Cricket Ground, Chelmsford
Umpires: Michael Gough and Steve O'Shaughnessy

- Somerset won the toss and elected to field.
- Will Smeed replaced Tom Kohler-Cadmore, and Archie Vaughan replaced Lewis Goldsworthy as an injury substitute for Somerset.
- Will Smeed (Somerset) made his first-class debut.
- Points: Somerset 21, Essex 3

10–13 April 2026
Scorecard

Warwickshire	v	Sussex (H)
267 (79.4 overs); Chris Woakes 64 (86); Henry Crocombe 3/44 (16 overs)		204 (50.3 overs); Ollie Robinson 39 (52); Ethan Bamber 3/47 (13 overs)
264 (80.3 overs); Rob Yates 90 (177); Fynn Hudson-Prentice 4/44 (17.3 overs)		328/5 (86 overs); Jack Leaning 120* (231); Michael Booth 2/59 (13 overs)

Sussex won by 5 wickets
County Cricket Ground, Hove
Umpires: Graham Lloyd and Russell Warren

- Warwickshire won the toss and elected to bat.
- Points: Sussex 19, Warwickshire 4

10–13 April 2026
Scorecard

Hampshire	v	Yorkshire (H)
251 (69.1 overs); Jake Lehmann 76 (93); George Hill 5/46 (13.1 overs)		177 (65.4 overs); Adam Lyth 76 (176); Sonny Baker 4/45 (12 overs)
351/5d (76 overs); Ben Brown 103 (109); Logan van Beek 4/85 (20 overs)		211 (69.1 overs); George Hill 52 (90); Kyle Abbott 6/21 (17 overs)

Hampshire won by 214 runs
Headingley, Leeds
Umpires: David Millns and Martin Saggers

- Yorkshire won the toss and elected to field.
- Ben Cliff replaced Jack White and Logan van Beek replaced Jhye Richardson as an injury substitute for Yorkshire.
- Points: Hampshire 20, Yorkshire 3

10–13 April 2026
Scorecard

Surrey (H)	v	Leicestershire
520 (113.2 overs); Jamie Smith 166 (240); Tom Scriven 3/81 (17.2 overs)		691 (170.4 overs); Rishi Patel 164 (262); Tom Lawes 4/141 (31 overs)
263/4d (62.3 overs); Jamie Smith 89 (109); Ajaz Patel 3/92 (23 overs)

Match drawn
The Oval, London
Umpires: Mike Burns and Tom Lungley

- Leicestershire won the toss and elected to field.
- Points: Leicestershire 15, Surrey 14.

10–13 April 2026
Scorecard

Nottinghamshire (H)	v	Glamorgan
279 (63.4 overs); Jack Haynes 100 (137); Timm van der Gugten 4/54 (18 overs)		113 (48 overs); Zain-ul-Hassan 27 (57); Brett Hutton 4/33 (13 overs)
311/9d (86 overs); Joe Clarke 136 (195); Andy Gorvin 3/55 (16 overs)		285 (96.5 overs); Asa Tribe 85 (104); Liam Patterson-White 3/13 (12.5 overs)

Nottinghamshire won by 192 runs
Trent Bridge, Nottingham
Umpires: Richard Illingworth and Rob White

- Glamorgan won the toss and elected to field.
- Sean Dickson replaced Ben Kellaway and Lyndon James replaced Fergus O'Neill as an injury substitute for Glamorgan and Nottinghamshire respectively.
- Points: Nottinghamshire 20, Glamorgan 3.

17–20 April 2026
Scorecard

Hampshire (H)	v	Somerset
238 (59.1 overs); Jake Lehmann 76 (110); Lewis Gregory 3/45 (11 overs)		288 (85.1 overs); James Rew 86 (115); Sonny Baker 3/67 (19 overs)
336 (101 overs); Nick Gubbins 83 (170); Lewis Gregory 5/42 (17 overs)		288/8 (92.1 overs); Tom Abell 101* (229); Sonny Baker 5/62 (17 overs)

Somerset wins by 2 wickets
The Rose Bowl, Southampton
Umpires: Nigel Llong and James Middlebrook

- Hampshire won the toss and elected to bat.
- Points: Somerset 20, Hampshire 3.

17–20 April 2026
Scorecard

Warwickshire (H)	v	Essex
190 (64.5 overs); Sam Hain 88* (179); Jamie Porter 4/59 (20 overs)		205 (73.5 overs); Simon Harmer 48 (91); Nathan Gilchrist 4/40 (9.5 overs)
220 (62.2 overs); Beau Webster 91 (123); Sam Cook 5/58 (15 overs)		164 (64.2 overs); Luc Benkenstein 39 (93); Keith Barker 4/29 (17 overs)

Warwickshire wins by 41 runs
Edgbaston, Birmingham
Umpires: Ben Debenham and Richard Kettleborough

- Essex won the toss and elected to field.
- Only 35.4 overs of play were possible on day 1 due to rain and a wet outfield.
- Points: Warwickshire 19, Essex 3.

24–27 April 2026
Scorecard

Warwickshire	v	Nottinghamshire (H)
459 (113.1 overs); Ed Barnard 165 (217); Josh Tongue 5/124 (27 overs)		279 (81.1 overs); Joe Clarke 94 (194); Michael Booth 4/71 (14 overs)
		537/7d (166 overs) (f/o); Kyle Verreynne 115 (243); Beau Webster 2/55 (23 overs)

Match drawn
Trent Bridge, Nottingham
Umpires: James Middlebrook and Paul Pollard

- Nottinghamshire won the toss and elected to field.
- Points: Warwickshire 16, Nottinghamshire 11.

24–27 April 2026
Scorecard

Sussex	v	Yorkshire (H)
502 (131.4 overs); John Simpson 136 (226); Jack White 4/60 (25.4 overs)		511 (139.2 overs); Finlay Bean 105 (192); Henry Crocombe 3/107 (23 overs)
324/8 (86 overs); Tom Clark 93 (177); Joe Root 3/67 (21 overs)

Match drawn
Headingley, Leeds
Umpires: Ben Debenham and Tom Lungley

- Yorkshire won the toss and elected to field.
- Points: Sussex 13, Yorkshire 13.

24–27 April 2026
Scorecard

Essex	v	Surrey (H)
409 (117.1 overs); Paul Walter 101 (184); Dan Lawrence 3/14 (5.1 overs)		472 (156.3 overs); Dan Lawrence 125 (204); Simon Harmer 3/69 (25.3 overs)
302/2d (9 overs); Tom Westley 136 (169); Gus Atkinson 1/12 (11 overs)

Match drawn
The Oval, London
Umpires: Jack Shantry and Martin Saggers

- Surrey won the toss and elected to field.
- Points: Surrey 12, Essex 12.

24–27 April 2026
Scorecard

Glamorgan (H)	v	Leicestershire
440 (142 overs); Mason Crane 99 (213); Ian Holland 2/33 (23 overs)		586/7d (169 overs); Jonny Tattersall 112 (200); Andy Gorvin 2/89 (30 overs)
137/2 (52 overs); Asa Tribe 67* (140); Josh Davey 1/19 (7 overs)

Match drawn
Sophia Gardens, Cardiff
Umpires: Ian Blackwell and Steve O'Shaughnessy

- Glamorgan won the toss and elected to bat.
- Points: Leicestershire 14, Glamorgan 12.

=== May ===
1–4 May 2026
Scorecard

Sussex	v	Surrey (H)
358/9d (83.2 overs); Jack Carson 105 (149); Jordan Clark 5/68 (16.2 overs)		622 (158.2 overs); Dom Sibley 187 (377); Jack Carson 4/128 (34 overs)
277 (85 overs); Charlie Tear 61 (131); Jordan Clark 3/40 (16 overs)		15/2 (4 overs); Ollie Pope 10* (7); James Coles 2/7 (2 overs)

Surrey won by 8 wickets
The Oval, London
Umpires: Graham Lloyd and Russell Warren

- Surrey won the toss and elected to field.
- No play was possible after tea on day 2 due to rain and wet outfield.
- Adam Thomas (Surrey) made his first-class debut.
- Adam Thomas scored his maiden century in first-class cricket.
- Points: Surrey 22, Sussex 4.

1–4 May 2026
Scorecard

Glamorgan	v	Hampshire (H)
536/7d (132 overs); Kiran Carlson 209 (232); Tom Prest 2/37 (7 overs)		214 (73.1 overs); Ben Mayes 59 (104); Timm van der Gugten 4/53 (19 overs)
		253 (92.5 overs) (f/o); Ben Brown 96 (145); Mason Crane 3/48 (24 overs)

Glamorgan won by an innings and 69 runs
The Rose Bowl, Southampton
Umpires: Ben Debenham and Mark Newell

- Hampshire won the toss and elected to field.
- No play was possible for most of the period after tea on day 2 due to rain and wet outfield.
- Zain-ul-Hassan (Glamorgan) scored his maiden century in first-class cricket.
- Kiran Carlson (Glamorgan) scored his maiden double hundred in first-class cricket.
- Points: Glamorgan 23, Hampshire 1.

1–4 May 2026
Scorecard

Yorkshire	v	Somerset (H)
162 (43.2 overs); Finlay Bean 35 (70); Lewis Gregory 6/43 (16 overs)		274 (78.4 overs); Josh Thomas 136 (155); Jack White 4/41 (16 overs)
371 (110.5 overs); James Wharton 92 (153); Craig Overton 4/94 (23.5 overs)		184 (69.2 overs); Josh Thomas 57 (165); Joe Root 4/49 (16 overs)

Yorkshire won by 75 runs
County Ground, Taunton
Umpires: Mike Burns and Rob White

- Somerset won the toss and elected to field.
- No play was possible for most of the period after lunch on day 2 due to rain and wet outfield.
- Josh Thomas (Somerset) scored his maiden century in first-class cricket.
- Points: Yorkshire 19, Somerset 4.

1–4 May 2026
Scorecard

Nottinghamshire	v	Leicestershire (H)
490 (121.1 overs); Ben Slater 178 (276); Ben Green 7/112 (33 overs)		308 (95.1 overs); Stephen Eskinazi 100 (191); Olly Stone 5/68 (22.2 overs)
77/0 (15.2 overs); Ben Slater 52* (55)		254 (87 overs) (f/o); Jonny Tattersall 61 (133); Liam Patterson-White 5/53 (36 overs)

Nottinghamshire won by 10 wickets
Grace Road, Leicester
Umpires: Richard Illingworth and Surendiran Shanmugam

- Leicestershire won the toss and elected to field.
- Tom Scriven replaced Josh Davey and James Hayes replaced Brett Hutton as an injury substitute for Leicestershire and Nottinghamshire respectively.
- Points: Nottinghamshire 23, Leicestershire 4.

8–10 May 2026
Scorecard

Hampshire	v	Essex (H)
235 (71.3 overs); Jake Lehmann 89 (164); Wiaan Mulder 3/46 (12.3 overs)		273 (90 overs); Simon Harmer 80* (118); James Fuller 5/43 (15 overs)
214 (79.5 overs); Nick Gubbins 71 (189); Simon Harmer 4/66 (31 overs)		178/4 (41.5 overs); Matt Critchley 90* (73); Kyle Abbott 4/35 (14 overs)

Essex won by 6 wickets
County Cricket Ground, Chelmsford
Umpires: Martin Saggers and Rob White

- Essex won the toss and elected to field.
- The match was scheduled for four days but completed in three.
- Points: Essex 20, Hampshire 3.

8–11 May 2026
Scorecard

Warwickshire (H)	v	Yorkshire
147 (55 overs); Sam Hain 57 (97); Jack White 4/49 (16 overs)		152 (45.2 overs); James Wharton 40 (58); Oliver Hannon-Dalby 4/38 (15 overs)
533/6d (141 overs); Sam Hain 164* (319); Logan van Beek 2/100 (19 overs)		171 (53.1 overs); Matt Revis 41 (93); Ethan Bamber 4/50 (19 overs)

Warwickshire won by 377 runs
Edgbaston, Birmingham
Umpires: Jack Shantry and Russell Warren

- Yorkshire won the toss and elected to field.
- Points: Warwickshire 19, Yorkshire 3.

8–11 May 2026
Scorecard

Nottinghamshire (H)	v	Surrey
415 (118 overs); Joe Clarke 129 (224); Daniel Worrall 6/73 (27 overs)		449 (138.3 overs); Dan Lawrence 104 (152); Josh Tongue 4/89 (28 overs)
414/4d (107 overs); Ben Duckett 203* (311); Daniel Worrall 1/40 (18 overs)

Match drawn
Trent Bridge, Nottingham
Umpires: Ian Blackwell and Nigel Llong

- Surrey won the toss and elected to field.
- Gus Atkinson replaced Reece Topley as an injury substitute for Surrey.
- Points: Nottinghamshire 15, Surrey 15.

8–11 May 2026
Scorecard

Somerset	v	Glamorgan (H)
354 (102.5 overs); Tom Abell 86 (152); Tom Norton 3/75 (19 overs)		229 (71.1 overs); Ben Kellaway 59 (101); Migael Pretorius 3/50 (12 overs)
157 (50.2 overs); Tom Abell 71 (128); Tom Norton 4/61 (16 overs)		285/8 (122.2 overs); Sean Dickson 76 (154); Migael Pretorius 4/74 (34 overs)

Glamorgan won by 2 wickets
Sophia Gardens, Cardiff
Umpires: Mark Newell and Paul Pollard

- Glamorgan won the toss and elected to field.
- Tom Norton (Glamorgan) made his first-class debut.
- Points: Glamorgan 19, Somerset 6.

8–11 May 2026
Scorecard

Leicestershire	v	Sussex (H)
328 (88.4 overs); Ian Holland 63 (126); Jack Carson 4/40 (13 overs)		430 (101 overs); Daniel Hughes 136 (162); Tom Helm 3/85 (28 overs)
232 (80.5 overs); Rishi Patel 56 (89); Fynn Hudson-Prentice 3/37 (18 overs)		131/3 (15.3 overs); Danial Ibrahim 48 (35); Ajaz Patel 1/15 (2 overs)

Sussex won by 7 wickets
County Cricket Ground, Hove
Umpires: Michael Gough and Surendiran Shanmugam

- Sussex won the toss and elected to field.
- Points: Sussex 23, Leicestershire 5.

15–17 May 2026
Scorecard

Leicestershire	v	Essex (H)
333 (90.2 overs); Sol Budinger 89 (114); Shane Snater 3/59 (18.2 overs)		293 (85 overs); Wiaan Mulder 79 (124); Ian Holland 4/54 (18 overs)
60 (27.4 overs); Ben Cox 20 (41); Shane Snater 4/12 (9 overs)		104/3 (30 overs); Matt Critchley 40* (59); Josh Hull 2/20 (5 overs)

Essex won by 7 wickets
County Cricket Ground, Chelmsford
Umpires: Nigel Llong and Neil Pratt

- Essex won the toss and elected to field.
- Nick Kelly replaced Jake Weatherald as an injury substitute for Leicestershire.
- The match was scheduled for four days but completed in three.
- Points: Essex 20, Leicestershire 5.

15–18 May 2026
Scorecard

Hampshire (H)	v	Nottinghamshire
214 (66.2 overs); Felix Organ 55 (73); Fergus O'Neill 5/51 (22 overs)		229 (76.1 overs); Liam Patterson-White 48 (74); Sonny Baker 5/45 (15.1 overs)
207/6 (81.3 overs); Jake Lehmann 102* (205); Fergus O'Neill 3/35 (20 overs)

Match drawn
The Rose Bowl, Southampton
Umpires: Steve O'Shaughnessy and Alex Wharf

- Nottinghamshire won the toss and elected to field.
- Sam Seecharan (Nottinghamshire) made his first-class debut.
- Sam Seecharan replaced Freddie McCann as an injury substitute for Nottinghamshire.
- Points: Hampshire 11, Nottinghamshire 11

15–18 May 2026
Scorecard

Glamorgan	v	Warwickshire (H)
360 (101.1 overs); Ben Kellaway 139 (242); Oliver Hannon-Dalby 5/53 (20.1 overs)		252 (63.5 overs); Jordan Thompson 57 (61); Tom Norton 4/48 (13.5 overs)
259 (78.4 overs); Colin Ingram 101 (159); Ethan Bamber 5/48 (20 overs)		100/2 (29 overs); Alex Davies 46 (66); Ryan Hadley 1/10 (4 overs)

Match drawn
Edgbaston, Birmingham
Umpires: Ian Blackwell and Rob White

- Warwickshire won the toss and elected to field.
- Points: Glamorgan 14, Warwickshire 12

15–18 May 2026
Scorecard

Yorkshire (H)	v	Surrey
486 (129 overs); Adam Lyth 141 (304); Matthew Fisher 4/92 (25 overs)		204 (59 overs); Sean Abbott 56 (61); George Hill 4/34 (13 overs)
		155 (51.1 overs) (f/o); Dom Sibley 34 (82); Harry Brook 3/11 (7.1 overs)

Yorkshire won by an innings and 127 runs
Headingley, Leeds
Umpires: James Middlebrook and Michael Gough

- Surrey won the toss and elected to field.
- Points: Yorkshire 23, Surrey 2.

15–18 May 2026
Scorecard

Somerset (H)	v	Sussex
526/8d (128.4 overs); Tom Abell 119 (192); Tom Haines 2/40 (12 overs)		253 (71.1 overs); Daniel Hughes 107 (140); Tom Lammonby 2/14 (6 overs)
		113/7 (57.4 overs) (f/o); Tom Clark 34 (95); Craig Overton 3/14 (13 overs)

Match drawn
County Ground, Taunton
Umpires: Ben Debenham and Tom Lungley

- Somerset won the toss and elected to bat.
- Points: Somerset 15, Sussex 10

=== June ===
7–10 June 2026
Scorecard

Surrey (H)	v	Hampshire
421 (82.5 overs); Dan Lawrence 218 (190); Kyle Abbott 3/76 (20.5 overs)		333 (96.4 overs); Delano Potgieter 84* (171); Jordan Clark 4/64 (21 overs)
259/5d (48 overs); Dom Sibley 105* (142); Kyle Abbott 1/31 (8 overs)		101/2 (44 overs); Ali Orr 53* (121); Reece Topley 2/20 (10 overs)

Match drawn
The Oval, London
Umpires: David Millns and Paul Pollard

- Hampshire won the toss and elected to field.
- Only 24.4 overs of play were possible on day 2 due to rain and a wet outfield.
- Dan Lawrence (Surrey) scored his maiden double hundred in first-class cricket.
- Points: Surrey 15, Hampshire 13

12–15 June 2026
Scorecard

Yorkshire (H)	v	Warwickshire
469 (110.4 overs); Will Luxton 167 (261); Ed Barnard 3/66 (18.4 overs)		263 (94.2 overs); Ed Barnard 83* (144); Hasan Ali 3/50 (21 overs)
246/6d (61 overs); Will Luxton 69 (115); Oliver Hannon-Dalby 2/25 (5 overs)		333/8 (110.5 overs); Sam Hain 69 (218); George Hill 3/32 (14 overs)

Match drawn
North Marine Road Ground, Scarborough
Umpires: Michael Gough and Tom Lungley

- Warwickshire won the toss and elected to field.
- Points: Yorkshire 16, Warwickshire 12

12–15 June 2026
Scorecard

Essex	v	Leicestershire (H)
401 (97.4 overs); Jordan Cox 204 (201); Rehan Ahmed 4/102 (23 overs)		187 (63.2 overs); Nick Kelly 78 (121); Simon Harmer 3/42 (18 overs)
217/4 (45.5 overs); Paul Walter 110 (135); Joey Evison 1/10 (1.5 overs)		428 (153.5 overs) (f/o); Lewis Hill 127 (320); Shane Snater 3/69 (34 overs)

Essex won by 6 wickets
Grace Road, Leicester
Umpires: Mark Newell and Rob White

- Leicestershire won the toss and elected to field.
- Sheridon Gumbs (Leicestershire) made his first-class debut.
- Michael Pepper replaced Jordan Cox for Essex on day 3 due to an international call-up
- Points: Essex 23, Leicestershire 3

12–14 June 2026
Scorecard

Glamorgan	v	Sussex (H)
155 (51.2 overs); Ben Kellaway 33 (63); Jaydev Unadkat 4/29 (14.2 overs)		521 (125.1 overs); James Coles 224* (226); Tom Norton 3/119 (22 overs)
268 (99.3 overs); Asa Tribe 64 (126); Tom Haines 3/5 (9 overs)

Sussex won by an innings and 98 runs
County Cricket Ground, Hove
Umpires: Ian Blackwell and Nigel Llong

- Sussex won the toss and elected to field.
- Dom Goodman replaced Henry Crocombe for Sussex on day 2 due to an international call-up.
- James Coles (Sussex) scored his maiden double hundred in first-class cricket.
- Points: Sussex 23, Glamorgan 2

12–15 June 2026
Scorecard

Somerset	v	Nottinghamshire (H)
310 (103 overs); Jordan Hermann 106 (211); Fergus O'Neill 6/72 (23 overs)		193 (64 overs); Jack Haynes 57 (102); Lewis Gregory 4/51 (13.4 overs)
355/7d (97 overs); Thomas Rew 127* (151); Liam Patterson-White 2/68 (20 overs)		166 (63.5 overs); Fergus O'Neill 54* (105); Craig Overton 5/29 (16.5 overs)

Somerset won by 306 runs
Trent Bridge, Nottingham
Umpires: James Middlebrook and Martin Saggers

- Nottinghamshire won the toss and elected to field.
- Jake Ball replaced Lewis Gregory as an injury substitute for Somerset.
- Thomas Rew (Somerset) scored his maiden century in first-class cricket.
- Points: Somerset 21, Nottinghamshire 3

19–21 June 2026
Scorecard

Essex (H)	v	Nottinghamshire
184 (57.4 overs); Tom Westley 44 (66); Liam Patterson-White 6/43 (16.4 overs)		457 (126 overs); Jack Haynes 137* (206); Simon Harmer 5/165 (45 overs)
221 (82.5 overs); Charlie Allison 56 (104); Fergus O'Neill 5/39 (13.5 overs)

Nottinghamshire won by an innings and 52 runs
County Cricket Ground, Chelmsford
Umpires: Tom Lungley and Paul Pollard

- Essex won the toss and elected to bat
- Points: Nottinghamshire 22, Essex 2

19–21 June 2026
Scorecard

Yorkshire	v	Leicestershire (H)
185 (54.2 overs); James Wharton 56 (109); Ben Green 3/27 (17 overs)		453 (113.4 overs); Rehan Ahmed 128 (168); Dan Moriarty 4/85 (20.4 overs)
229 (74.1 overs); Dan Moriarty 51 (84); Josh Davey 3/36 (16 overs)

Leicestershire won by an innings and 39 runs
Grace Road, Leicester
Umpires: Ben Debenham and Russell Warren

- Yorkshire won the toss and elected to bat
- Points: Leicestershire 23, Yorkshire 2

19–22 June 2026
Scorecard

Glamorgan (H)	v	Surrey
358 (114.1 overs); Mason Crane 106 (234); Gus Atkinson 4/61 (22.1 overs)		105 (34.4 overs); Adam Thomas 25 (62); Tom Norton 5/50 (10 overs)
197/3 (45.1 overs); Kiran Carlson 67 (94); Rahul Chahar 2/57 (11.1 overs)		447 (142.5 overs) (f/o); Rory Burns 115 (258); Ryan Hadley 4/82 (20.5 overs)

Glamorgan won by 7 wickets
Sophia Gardens, Cardiff
Umpires: Ulhas Gandhe and Rob White

- Glamorgan won the toss and elected to bat
- Tom Lawes replaced Gus Atkinson for Surrey on day 3 due to an international call-up.
- Mason Crane (Glamorgan) scored his maiden century in first-class cricket.
- Points: Glamorgan 22, Surrey 2

19–21 June 2026
Scorecard

Hampshire	v	Sussex (H)
191 (60.4 overs); Nick Gubbins 52 (105); Tom Price 3/27 (12 overs)		159 (49.5 overs); Tom Haines 52 (57); Kyle Abbott 6/49 (18 overs)
220 (85.5 overs); Delano Potgieter 55 (129); Jack Carson 3/37 (19.5 overs)		134 (56.5 overs); Tom Alsop 43 (129); Eddie Jack 4/36 (14 overs)

Hampshire won by 118 runs
County Cricket Ground, Hove
Umpires: Mike Burns and Jack Shantry

- Hampshire won the toss and elected to bat
- Points: Hampshire 19, Sussex 3

19–22 June 2026
Scorecard

Somerset (H)	v	Warwickshire
208 (65 overs); Lewis Goldsworthy 90 (184); Beau Webster 4/23 (8 overs)		330 (102 overs); Sam Hain 68 (157); Alfie Ogborne 3/40 (11 overs)
435 (153.5 overs); Thomas Rew 149 (287); Manav Suthar 5/100 (46.5 overs)		98/2 (39 overs); Rob Yates 51* (122); Jack Leach 2/24 (16 overs)

Match drawn
County Ground, Taunton
Umpires: Nigel Llong and David Millns

- Somerset won the toss and elected to bat
- Alfie Ogborne replaced Migael Pretorius as an injury substitute for Somerset.
- Points: Warwickshire 13, Somerset 11

=== August ===
20–22 August 2026
Scorecard

Nottinghamshire	v	Surrey (H)
184 (68.2 overs); Liam Patterson-White 76* (112); Tom Lawes 5/45 (17.2 overs)		162 (66.3 overs); Adam Thomas 48 (93); Olly Stone 6/44 (21.3 overs)
306 (90.3 overs); Joe Clarke 95 (151); Daniel Worrall 4/39 (23 overs)		183 (56 overs); Ollie Pope 111 (134); Olly Stone 4/50 (14 overs)

Nottinghamshire won by 145 runs
The Oval, London
Umpires: Michael Gough and Paul Pollard

- Surrey won the toss and elected to field.
- Ben Martindale (Nottinghamshire) made his first-class debut.
- Josh Blake replaced Ryan Patel as an injury substitute for Surrey.
- Points: Nottinghamshire 19, Surrey 3

20–22 August 2026
Scorecard

Sussex	v	Warwickshire (H)
156 (47.4 overs); Tom Haines 49 (85); Chris Woakes 4/36 (13 overs)		161 (47.3 overs); Michael Booth 34* (45); Sean Hunt 4/30 (11 overs)
207 (61.5 overs); Tom Haines 67 (114); Ethan Bamber 3/42 (16 overs)		206/9 (53.1 overs); Vansh Jani 62 (82); Sean Hunt 5/65 (17 overs)

Warwickshire won by 1 wicket
Edgbaston, Birmingham
Umpires: Neil Pratt and Rob White

- Warwickshire won the toss and elected to field.
- Danial Ibrahim replaced Fynn Hudson-Prentice as an injury substitute for Sussex.
- Points: Warwickshire 19, Sussex 3

20–23 August 2026
Scorecard

Leicestershire (H)	v	Glamorgan
151 (62.5 overs); Ian Holland 23 (61); Raymond Toole 3/48 (18.5 overs)		152 (53.1 overs); Mason Crane 44 (110); Ian Holland 4/30 (13.1 overs)
257 (74.2 overs); Sheridon Gumbs 93 (152); Zain-ul-Hassan 3/46 (14 overs)		214 (86 overs); Kiran Carlson 99 (188); Ian Holland 5/19 (24 overs)

Leicestershire won by 42 runs
Grace Road, Leicester
Umpires: Mike Burns and Ben Debenham

- Glamorgan won the toss and elected to field.
- Points: Leicestershire 19, Glamorgan 3

20–23 August 2026
Scorecard

Somerset (H)	v	Essex
469 (127.5 overs); Josh Thomas 110 (162); Sam Cook 4/92 (29 overs)		158 (42.4 overs); Matt Critchley 50 (88); Jack Leach 4/37 (13 overs)
95/2 (18 overs); Tom Lammonby 33* (49); Simon Harmer 2/35 (9.2 overs)		412 (161.1 overs) (f/o); Charlie Allison 114 (254); Jack Leach 5/81 (55.2 overs)

Somerset won by 8 wickets
County Ground, Taunton
Umpires: Ian Blackwell and Martin Saggers

- Essex won the toss and elected to field.
- Points: Somerset 22, Essex 2

20–23 August 2026
Scorecard

Yorkshire	v	Hampshire (H)
173 (61.2 overs); Dom Bess 40* (79); Kyle Abbott 4/17 (18 overs)		197 (88 overs); Tom Prest 46 (117); George Hill 5/29 (20 overs)
301 (98.1 overs); Adam Lyth 51 (108); Felix Organ 4/59 (22.1 overs)		238 (98.2 overs); Toby Albert 57 (170); Dom Bess 5/103 (46 overs)

Yorkshire won by 39 runs
The Rose Bowl, Southampton
Umpires: Jack Shantry and Russell Warren

- Yorkshire won the toss and elected to bat.
- Jafer Chohan (Yorkshire) made his first-class debut.
- Points: Yorkshire 19, Hampshire 3

27–30 August 2026
Scorecard

Nottinghamshire	v	Warwickshire (H)
325/8d (88.1 overs); Joe Clarke 150 (221); Ethan Bamber 3/74 (23.1 overs)		185 (54.1 overs); Michael Booth 46 (54); Olly Stone 5/49 (13 overs)

Match drawn
Edgbaston, Birmingham
Umpires: Mark Newell and Martin Saggers

- Warwickshire won the toss and elected to field.
- No play was possible on day 1 and 3 due to rain.
- Points: Nottinghamshire 13, Warwickshire 10

27–30 August 2026
Scorecard

Surrey	v	Essex (H)
183 (53.2 overs); Adam Thomas 43 (65); Zaman Akhter 3/36 (10.2 overs)		279 (85 overs); Dean Elgar 113 (191); Rahul Chahar 6/80 (22 overs)
298/8d (99 overs); Ben Foakes 120* (226); Simon Harmer 3/92 (38 overs)

Match drawn
County Cricket Ground, Chelmsford
Umpires: Mike Burns and Nigel Llong

- Essex won the toss and elected to field.
- No play was possible on day 3 due to rain.
- Nikhil Gorantla (Surrey) made his first-class debut.
- Sam Cook replaced Charlie Bennett and Ollie Pope replaced Nikhil Gorantla on day 1 after returning from international duty for Essex and Surrey respectively.
- Points: Essex 12, Surrey 11

27–30 August 2026
Scorecard

Yorkshire (H)	v	Leicestershire
263 (76.4 overs); James Wharton 70 (131); Josh Hull 3/57 (12 overs)		84/0 (35.3 overs); Rishi Patel 41* (107)

Match drawn
North Marine Road Ground, Scarborough
Umpires: Ian Blackwell and Graham Lloyd

- Leicestershire won the toss and elected to field.
- No play was possible on day 4 due to rain.
- Points: Leicestershire 11, Yorkshire 9

27–30 August 2026
Scorecard

Hampshire	v	Glamorgan (H)
162 (40.2 overs); Jake Lehmann 51* (59); Zain-ul-Hassan 3/33 (11 overs)		161 (60 overs); Ben Kellaway 57 (92); Sonny Baker 4/34 (11 overs)
300/8d (69.3 overs); Toby Albert 64 (130); Ben Kellaway 4/78 (15 overs)		21/3 (13.5 overs); Ben Kellaway 8* (28); Kyle Abbott 2/7 (7 overs)

Match drawn
Sophia Gardens, Cardiff
Umpires: James Middlebrook and Surendiran Shanmugam

- Glamorgan won the toss and elected to field.
- Sonny Baker replaced Scott Currie on day 1 after returning from international duty for Hampshire.
- Points: Glamorgan 11, Hampshire 11

27–30 August 2026
Scorecard

Somerset	v	Sussex (H)
202 (58 overs); Tom Abell 72 (110); Henry Crocombe 5/56 (14 overs)		250 (69.4 overs); Tom Clark 85 (83); Craig Overton 4/66 (20 overs)
350/9d (97.2 overs); Tom Lammonby 93 (171); Tom Clark 2/17 (3 overs)		62/1 (14 overs); Tom Haines 30* (37); Migael Pretorius 1/17 (4 overs)

Match drawn
County Cricket Ground, Hove
Umpires: Tom Lungley and Jack Shantry

- Sussex won the toss and elected to field.
- No play was possible on day 3 due to rain.
- Jake Ball replaced Josh Shaw as a substitute for Somerset due to a significant life event.
- Points: Sussex 12, Somerset 11

=== September ===
2–5 September 2026
Scorecard

Sussex	v	Essex (H)
275 (99 overs); Jack Leaning 60 (110); Jamie Porter 4/44 (15 overs)		177 (58.5 overs); Charlie Allison 56 (86); Henry Crocombe 5/39 (9.5 overs)
230 (50.1 overs); James Coles 79 (125); Zaman Akhter 4/51 (11.1 overs)		281 (73.3 overs); Matt Critchley 96 (132); James Coles 4/98 (29.3 overs)

Sussex won by 47 runs
County Cricket Ground, Chelmsford
Umpires: Surendiran Shanmugam and Russell Warren

- Sussex won the toss and elected to bat.
- Jamie Porter replaced Charlie Bennett as an injury substitute for Essex, and Mitchell Killeen replaced Sam Cook due to an international call-up for Essex, while Oli Carter replaced Daniel Hughes as an injury substitute for Sussex.
- Points: Sussex 20, Essex 3

2–4 September 2026
Scorecard

Yorkshire	v	Surrey (H)
185 (75.4 overs); James Wharton 45 (123); Tom Lawes 4/36 (17.4 overs)		83 (30 overs); Ollie Pope 21 (44); Jack White 3/14 (9 overs)
82 (28.5 overs); Will Luxton 29 (31); Matthew Fisher 6/25 (9 overs)		187/9 (73.2 overs); Josh Blake 43* (183); George Hill 4/52 (23 overs)

Surrey won by 1 wicket
The Oval, London
Umpires: David Millns and Rob White

- Surrey won the toss and elected to field.
- Points: Surrey 19, Yorkshire 3

2–5 September 2026
Scorecard

Nottinghamshire (H)	v	Leicestershire
451/8d (99.5 overs); Jack Haynes 159 (183); Josh Davey 3/88 (23 overs)		365 (155.1 overs); Josh Hull 97 (247); Dillon Pennington 5/49 (23 overs)
178/1d (41 overs); Haseeb Hameed 109 (118); Rishi Patel 1/81 (18 overs)

Match drawn
Trent Bridge, Nottingham
Umpires: James Middlebrook and Neil Pratt

- Leicestershire won the toss and elected to field.
- Tom Giles (Nottinghamshire) made his first-class debut.
- Tom Giles replaced Brett Hutton as an injury substitute for Nottinghamshire.
- Points: Nottinghamshire 15, Leicestershire 11

2–4 September 2026
Scorecard

Glamorgan	v	Somerset (H)
194 (59.2 overs); Ben Kellaway 51 (82); Migael Pretorius 3/45 (16 overs)		441 (109.1 overs); Tom Lammonby 95 (173); Mason Crane 4/95 (23.1 overs)
183 (59 overs); Asa Tribe 49 (108); Craig Overton 3/29 (10 overs)

Somerset won by an innings and 64 runs
County Ground, Taunton
Umpires: Michael Gough and Nigel Llong

- Somerset won the toss and elected to field.
- Connor O'Riordan (Glamorgan) made his first-class debut.
- Points: Somerset 23, Glamorgan 3

2–4 September 2026
Scorecard

Warwickshire	v	Hampshire (H)
398 (116 overs); Rob Yates 109 (208); Kyle Abbott 4/51 (25 overs)		115 (38.1 overs); Toby Albert 24 (37); Oliver Hannon-Dalby 3/14 (8 overs)
		154 (60.3 overs) (f/o); Jake Lehmann 42 (71); Manav Suthar 4/52 (23.3 overs)

Warwickshire won by an innings and 129 runs
The Rose Bowl, Southampton
Umpires: Mike Burns and Steve O'Shaughnessy

- Hampshire won the toss and elected to field.
- Points: Warwickshire 22, Hampshire 3

8–11 September 2026
Scorecard

Nottinghamshire (H)	v	Hampshire
377 (89.4 overs); Joe Clarke 105 (166); Scott Currie 4/61 (23.4 overs)		304 (116.4 overs); Jake Lehmann 133 (247); Dillon Pennington 3/60 (60 overs)
104 (31.5 overs); Joe Clarke 37 (65); Manny Lumsden 5/36 (8.5 overs)		123 (49.2 overs); Scott Currie 44* (105); Olly Stone 6/28 (14 overs)

Nottinghamshire won by 54 runs
Trent Bridge, Nottingham
Umpires: Ben Debenham and Richard Kettleborough

- Hampshire won the toss and elected to field.
- Manny Lumsden (Hampshire) made his first-class debut.
- Points: Nottinghamshire 22, Hampshire 3

8–10 September 2026
Scorecard

Yorkshire (H)	v	Essex
390 (118 overs); Dom Bess 80* (137); Matt Critchley 5/85 (30 overs)		171 (69.4 overs); George Bell 64* (118); Kuldeep Yadav 4/70 (23 overs)
		113 (40 overs) (f/o); Paul Walter 48 (104); Kuldeep Yadav 6/50 (16 overs)

Yorkshire won by an innings and 106 runs
Headingley, Leeds
Umpires: Steve O'Shaughnessy and James Middlebrook

- Yorkshire won the toss and elected to bat.
- Sam Cook replaced Mitchell Killeen on day 2 after returning from international duty, before Mitchell Killeen replaced Jamie Porter as an injury substitute for Essex.
- Points: Yorkshire 22, Essex 2

8–9 September 2026
Scorecard

Glamorgan (H)	v	Warwickshire
69 (26.3 overs); Colin Ingram 19 (19); Ethan Bamber 5/28 (8 overs)		391 (97.5 overs); Sam Hain 76 (149); Ben Kellaway 3/79 (19 overs)
65 (26.1 overs); Asa Tribe 27 (56); Ed Barnard 5/13 (6.1 overs)

Warwickshire won by an innings and 257 runs
Sophia Gardens, Cardiff
Umpires: Graham Lloyd and Tom Lungley

- Glamorgan won the toss and elected to bat.
- Jack Hope-Bell (Glamorgan) made his first-class debut.
- Points: Warwickshire 22, Glamorgan 3

8–11 September 2026
Scorecard

Sussex (H)	v	Surrey
393 (104 overs); Charlie Tear 89 (205); Rahul Chahar 4/97 (29 overs)		321 (104.4 overs); Mahipal Lomror 58 (126); Sean Hunt 3/65 (20 overs)
167/3d (65 overs); Tom Haines 63 (128); Matthew Fisher 1/5 (6 overs)

Match drawn
County Cricket Ground, Hove
Umpires: Nigel Llong and Jack Shantry

- Sussex won the toss and elected to bat.
- No play was possible on day 1 due to rain.
- George Thomas (Sussex) made his first-class debut.
- Ollie Pope replaced Josh Blake on day 2 for Surrey after returning from international duty.
- Points: Sussex 14, Surrey 13

8–10 September 2026
Scorecard

Somerset	v	Leicestershire (H)
363 (75.4 overs); Josh Thomas 100 (154); Nathan Gilchrist 3/73 (16.4 overs)		157 (51.1 overs); Nick Kelly 39 (47); Craig Overton 3/23 (13 overs)
316/5d (68.4 overs); Henry Nicholls 100* (112); Rehan Ahmed 2/76 (19 overs)		145 (45.1 overs Ben Cox 39 (59); Craig Overton 4/33 (11 overs)

Somerset won by 377 runs
Grace Road, Leicester
Umpires: David Millns and Paul Pollard

- Leicestershire won the toss and elected to field.
- Josh Hull replaced Alex Green as an illness substitute for Leicestershire.
- Points: Somerset 22, Leicestershire 3

15–16 September 2026
Scorecard

Essex (H)	v	Warwickshire
134 (44 overs); George Bell 61* (84); Ethan Bamber 6/26 (15 overs)		191 (61.1 overs); Sam Hain 88* (175); Matt Critchley 4/54 (19.1 overs)
189 (59.5 overs); Paul Walter 42 (56); Manav Suthar 5/75 (24 overs)		138/2 (25.3 overs); Zen Malik 51 (55); Jack Auld 1/27 (5 overs)

Warwickshire won by 8 wickets
County Cricket Ground, Chelmsford
Umpires: Nigel Llong and Tom Lungley

- Essex won the toss and elected to bat.
- Jack Auld (Essex) made his first-class debut.
- Jack Auld and Luc Benkenstein replaced Shane Snater and Tom Westley as injury substitutes for Essex.
- Points: Warwickshire 19, Essex 3

15–18 September 2026
Scorecard

Hampshire	v	Leicestershire (H)
214 (54.4 overs); Ben Brown 80* (115); Ian Holland 6/38 (15.4 overs)		244 (63.3 overs); Hamza Shaikh 63 (122); Kyle Abbott 4/58 (18 overs)
363 (108.1 overs); Nick Gubbins 133 (255); Ajaz Patel 4/103 (34 overs)		335/5 (91 overs); Nick Kelly 86 (145); Manny Lumsden 2/102 (16 overs)

Leicestershire won by 5 wickets
Grace Road, Leicester
Umpires: Michael Gough and Mark Newell

- Leicestershire won the toss and elected to field.
- Tom Scriven replaced Josh Davey as an injury substitute for Leicestershire.
- Points: Leicestershire 19, Hampshire 3

15–18 September 2026
Scorecard

Yorkshire (H)	v	Somerset
212 (65.4 overs); Jonny Bairstow (79 (111); Lewis Gregory 3/46 (18 overs)		201 (59.4 overs); Craig Overton 64 (111); Ben Cliff 8/76 (16.4 overs)
275 (111 overs); George Hill 89 (173); Craig Overton 3/44 (27 overs)		101 (48.2 overs); Tom Lammonby 32 (92); Ben Coad 4/33 (18 overs)

Yorkshire won by 185 runs
Headingley, Leeds
Umpires: Richard Kettleborough and Jack Shantry

- Yorkshire won the toss and elected to bat.
- Points: Yorkshire 19, Somerset 3

15–18 September 2026
Scorecard

Glamorgan	v	Surrey (H)
132 (45.5 overs); Jack Hope-Bell 33 (45); Auqib Nabi 4/36 (10 overs)		115 (33 overs); Ryan Patel 26 (37); Zain-ul-Hassan 4/26 (8 overs)
594 (162.2 overs); Asa Tribe 155 (337); Adam Thomas 2/74 (15.2 overs)		427 (108.2 overs); Ryan Patel 132 (213); Zain-ul-Hassan 2/67 (19 overs)

Glamorgan won by 184 runs
The Oval, London
Umpires: Ian Blackwell and Ben Debenham

- Surrey won the toss and elected to field.
- James Taylor replaced Matthew Fisher as an injury substitute for Surrey.
- Points: Glamorgan 19, Surrey 3

15–18 September 2026
Scorecard

Nottinghamshire	v	Sussex (H)
240 (84.4 overs); Brett Hutton 60 (125); Jaydev Unadkat 4/83 (22.4 overs)		358 (110.2 overs); Tom Clark 89 (121); Brett Hutton 4/59 (19 overs)
193 (67.5 overs); Haseeb Hameed 43 (79); Ari Karvelas 5/42 (20 overs)		76/3 (18 overs); George Thomas 38 (40); Mukesh Kumar 1/8 (3 overs)

Sussex won by 7 wickets
County Cricket Ground, Hove
Umpires: Mike Burns and David Millns

- Sussex won the toss and elected to field.
- Ben Slater (Nottinghamshire) passed 10,000 runs in first-class cricket.
- Points: Sussex 22, Nottinghamshire 3

24–26 September 2026
Scorecard

Leicestershire	v	Warwickshire (H)
125 (47 overs); Ben Cox 33 (56); Ethan Bamber 4/42 (16 overs)		372 (113.3 overs); Sam Hain 142 (301); Ajaz Patel 3/78 (25.3 overs)
168 (56.1 overs); Tom Scriven 49 (85); Ethan Bamber 5/52 (20.1 overs)

Warwickshire won by an innings and 79 runs
Edgbaston, Birmingham
Umpires: Steve O'Shaughnessy and Russell Warren

- Leicestershire won the toss and elected to bat.
- Points: Warwickshire 22, Leicestershire 3

24–26 September 2026
Scorecard

Nottinghamshire (H)	v	Yorkshire
251 (99.4 overs); Haseeb Hameed 71 (187); Ben Cliff 4/39 (17 overs)		179 (53.1 overs); George Hill 58 (57); Olly Stone 5/51 (17 overs)
85 (38.5 overs); Jack Haynes 27 (37); Jack White 5/23 (15 overs)		159/9 (52.5 overs); Will Luxton 53 (86); Liam Patterson-White 4/38 (20 overs)

Yorkshire won by 1 wicket
Trent Bridge, Nottingham
Umpires: Michael Gough and Nigel Llong

- Yorkshire won the toss and elected to field.
- Tom Giles replaced Olly Stone as an injury substitute for Nottinghamshire.
- Points: Yorkshire 19, Nottinghamshire 4

24–26 September 2026
Scorecard

Sussex	v	Hampshire (H)
244 (71.5 overs); Jack Leaning 78 (109); Eddie Jack 3/38 (13.5 overs)		128 (59 overs); Ben Brown 36* (98); Jaydev Unadkat 5/32 (17 overs)
319/9d (78 overs); Tom Haines 130 (218); Andrew Neal 4/98 (27 overs)		238 (54.4 overs); Nick Gubbins 51 (88); Tom Price 5/33 (8.4 overs)

Sussex won by 197 runs
The Rose Bowl, Southampton
Umpires: Ian Blackwell and Paul Pollard

- Sussex won the toss and elected to bat.
- Points: Sussex 19, Hampshire 3

24–27 September 2026
Scorecard

Glamorgan (H)	v	Essex
505 (157.1 overs); Asa Tribe 184 (383); Zaman Akhter 5/107 (23.1 overs)		129 (45.1 overs); Simon Harmer 35 (51); Zain-ul-Hassan 5/14 (8.1 overs)
		351/6 (85.3 overs) (f/o); Dean Elgar 108 (181); Mason Crane 2/58 (14 overs)

Match drawn
Sophia Gardens, Cardiff
Umpires: Mike Burns and Alex Wharf

- Essex won the toss and elected to field.
- Points: Glamorgan 13, Essex 9

24–27 September 2026
Scorecard

Surrey	v	Somerset (H)
422 (121.3 overs); Dan Lawrence 139 (163); Jack Leach 4/91 (34.3 overs)		731 (171.1 overs); Tom Abell 307 (407); Mahipal Lomror 4/212 (50 overs)
127/5 (54 overs); Nikhil Gorantla 28 (47); Lewis Gregory 2/22 (9 overs)

Match drawn
County Ground, Taunton
Umpires: Tom Lungley and Martin Saggers

- Surrey won the toss and elected to bat.
- Ralphie Albert replaced Rahul Chahar as an injury substitute, and Nikhil Gorantla replaced Dan Lawrence due to an international call-up, for Surrey.
- Points: Somerset 13, Surrey 12

== Division Two fixtures ==
=== April ===
3–6 April 2026
Scorecard

Derbyshire (H)	v	Worcestershire
625/8d (140.4 overs); Martin Andersson 228 (271); Tom Taylor 3/160 (29 overs)		312 (94.1 overs); Dan Lategan 89 (153); Anuj Dal 3/22 (14.1 overs)
		314/7 (120 overs) (f/o); Matthew Waite 66 (141); Mohammad Abbas 2/31 (19 overs)

Match drawn
County Ground, Derby
Umpires: Tom Lungley and Chris Watts

- Worcestershire won the toss and elected to field.
- Luis Reece (Derbyshire) scored his 7,000th run in first-class cricket.
- Martin Andersson (Derbyshire) scored his maiden double hundred in first-class cricket.
- Points: Derbyshire 16, Worcestershire 11

3–6 April 2026
Scorecard

Middlesex (H)	v	Gloucestershire
445/9d (131 overs); Leus du Plooy 182 (274); Miles Hammond 2/2 (1 over)		216 (87 overs); Miles Hammond 77 (172); Toby Roland-Jones 5/37 (22 overs)
		215 (112.3 overs) (f/o); Joe Phillips 45 (85); Sebastian Morgan 4/48 (20 overs)

Middlesex won by an innings and 14 runs
Lord's, London
Umpires: Ben Debenham and Jack Shantry

- Gloucestershire won the toss and elected to field.
- Points: Middlesex 22, Gloucestershire -1. (Note: Gloucestershire were deducted a total of 2 points for maintaining a slow over-rate.)

3–6 April 2026
Scorecard

Lancashire	v	Northamptonshire (H)
384 (106.3 overs); Josh Bohannon 90 (167); Ben Sanderson 5/79 (28.3 overs)		258 (81.4 overs); Lewis McManus 75* (188); James Anderson 5/66 (18 overs)
194 (75.4 overs); Ajeet Singh Dale 44* (122); Harry Conway 4/38 (13 overs)		213/9 (100 overs); George Bartlett 95* (197); James Anderson 3/45 (16 overs)

Match drawn
County Ground, Northampton
Umpires: Paul Baldwin and Mark Newell

- Lancashire won the toss and elected to bat.
- Points: Lancashire 14, Northamptonshire 12

3–6 April 2026
Scorecard

Durham (H)	v	Kent
335 (77.4 overs); Emilio Gay 128 (141); Keith Dudgeon 4/83 (19 overs)		197 (55.2 overs); Sam Northeast 94 (144); Matthew Potts 3/45 (19 overs)
218/9d (52 overs); David Bedingham 48 (70); Keith Dudgeon 3/34 (9 overs)		234/5 (57 overs); Tawanda Muyeye 109* (121); Ben Raine 2/38 (14 overs)

Match drawn
Riverside Ground, Chester-le-Street
Umpires: Naeem Ashraf and Surendiran Shanmugam

- Kent won the toss and elected to field.
- No play was possible on day 3 due to rain and wet outfield in the aftermath of Storm Dave.
- Points: Durham 13, Kent 11

10–12 April 2026
Scorecard

Worcestershire	v	Middlesex (H)
191 (54.5 overs); Brett D'Oliveira 75 (109); Ryan Higgins 3/39 (13.5 overs)		183 (63.1 overs); Zafar Gohar 42 (91); Oliver Hannon-Dalby 4/45 (19 overs)
253 (82.2 overs); Jake Libby 79 (142); Ryan Higgins 4/68 (24 overs)		204 (70.3 overs); Joe Cracknell 43* (92); Tom Taylor 3/50 (20.3 overs)

Worcestershire won by 57 runs
Lord's, London
Umpires: Richard Kettleborough and James Tredwell

- Middlesex won the toss and elected to field.
- Matthew Waite (Worcestershire), Max Holden and Sam Robson (Middlesex) all scored their 2,000th, 5,000th and 14,000th run respectively in first-class cricket.
- Ben Gibbon replaced Adam Finch as an injury substitute for Worcestershire.
- Points: Worcestershire 17, Middlesex 3. (Note: Worcestershire were deducted a total of 2 points for maintaining a slow over-rate.)

10–12 April 2026
Scorecard

Durham	v	Gloucestershire (H)
605/5d (114 overs); Ben McKinney 244 (246); Craig Miles 2/89 (13 overs)		174 (48.3 overs); Oliver Price 34 (63); Ben Raine 5/45 (12.3 overs)
		205 (67.3 overs) (f/o); Cameron Bancroft 56 (106); Callum Parkinson 3/35 (17 overs)

Durham won by an innings and 225 runs
County Ground, Bristol
Umpires: Paul Pollard and Neil Pratt

- Gloucestershire won the toss and elected to field.
- Ben McKinney (Durham) scored his maiden double century in first-class cricket.
- Oliver Price (Gloucestershire) scored his 3,000th run in first-class cricket.
- Points: Durham 24, Gloucestershire 1

10–13 April 2026
Scorecard

Northamptonshire	v	Kent (H)
684/2d (133.3 overs); Luke Procter 261* (357); Keith Dudgeon 1/68 (25 overs)		178 (64.1 overs); Tawanda Muyeye 48 (57); Harry Conway 5/36 (15 overs)
		253/5 (91 overs) (f/o); Ben Compton 114 (287); Harry Conway 2/59 (18 overs)

Match drawn
St Lawrence Ground, Canterbury
Umpires: Hassan Adnan and Anthony Harris

- Northamptonshire won the toss and elected to bat.
- Luke Procter (Northamptonshire) scored his maiden double century in first-class cricket.
- Points: Northamptonshire 16, Kent 8.

10–13 April 2026
Scorecard

Lancashire (H)	v	Derbyshire
351 (91.2 overs); Marcus Harris 125 (182); Shoaib Bashir 4/76 (20 overs)		374 (114.3 overs); Harry Came 83 (151); Paul Coughlin 4/79 (18.3 overs)
160 (54 overs); Marcus Harris 66 (136); Mohammad Abbas 3/32 (15 overs)		108 (34.5 overs); Harry Came 30 (63); James Anderson 4/18 (9.5 overs)

Lancashire won by 29 runs
Old Trafford, Manchester
Umpires: Sue Redfern and Jack Shantry

- Derbyshire won the toss and elected to field.
- Points: Lancashire 21, Derbyshire 6.

17–20 April 2026
Scorecard

Middlesex (H)	v	Northamptonshire (H)
341 (73 overs); Zafar Gohar 83 (133); Ben Sanderson 5/62 (19 overs)		409 (111.4 overs); James Sales 164 (265); Toby Roland-Jones 3/83 (29 overs)
353/3 (104 overs); Sam Robson 162 (305); Luke Procter 1/49 (12 overs)

Match drawn
County Ground, Northampton
Umpires: Sue Redfern and Surendiran Shanmugam

- Middlesex won the toss and elected to bat.
- Play on Day 1 was reduced to 73 overs due to bad light.
- Play on Day 2 was reduced to 71.5 overs due to bad light.
- Luke Hollman replaced Zafar Gohar as an injury substitute for Middlesex.
- Points: Northamptonshire 15, Middlesex 13.

17–20 April 2026
Scorecard

Gloucestershire (H)	v	Lancashire
136 (50.5 overs); Oliver Price 35 (60); George Balderson 5/34 (19.5 overs)		240 (72.2 overs); Keaton Jennings 70 (110); Matthew Taylor 6/43 (18.2 overs)
305 (93.5 overs); James Bracey 114 (227); James Anderson 4/51 (24 overs)		203/6 (61.5 overs); Keaton Jennings 78* (175); Will Williams 3/44 (13 overs)

Lancashire won by 4 wickets
County Ground, Bristol
Umpires: Ian Blackwell and Ben Peverall

- Lancashire won the toss and elected to field.
- Only 44 overs of play was possible on day 1 due to rain and wet outfield.
- Tommy Boorman (Gloucestershire) made his first-class debut.
- Ollie Sutton replaced Ajeet Singh Dale and Harry Singh replaced Luke Wells as an injury substitute for Lancashire.
- Points: Lancashire 19, Gloucestershire 3.

24–27 April 2026
Scorecard

Gloucestershire	v	Derbyshire (H)
498 (148.4 overs); Miles Hammond 145 (241); Shoaib Bashir 3/116 (31.1 overs)		281 (101.1 overs); Wayne Madsen 65 (92); Graeme van Buuren 3/31 (19 overs)
39/0 (4.4 overs); Ben Charlesworth 20* (13)		252 (95.2 overs) (f/o); Matt Montgomery 74 (165); Gabe Bell 3/44 (18 overs)

Gloucestershire won by 10 wickets
County Ground, Derby
Umpires: Mark Newell and Neil Pratt

- Gloucestershire won the toss and elected to bat.
- Luis Reece replaced Anuj Dal as an injury substitute for Derbyshire.
- Craig Miles replaced Henry Brookes as an injury substitute for Gloucestershire.
- Points: Gloucestershire 21, Derbyshire 3.

24–27 April 2026
Scorecard

Lancashire	v	Durham (H)
370 (100 overs); Marcus Harris 146 (265); Ben Raine 4/77 (24 overs)		295 (87.2 overs); Matthew Potts 66 (135); Tom Bailey 3/68 (20.2 overs)
260/9d (85.3 overs); Paul Coughlin 100* (154); Ben Raine 3/50 (20.3 overs)		336/2 (77.5 overs); Emilio Gay 159* (211); Mitchell Stanley 1/49 (12 overs)

Durham won by 8 wickets
Riverside Ground, Chester-le-Street
Umpires: Chris Watts and Hassan Adnan

- Durham won the toss and elected to field.
- James Minto replaced Sam Conners as an injury substitute for Durham.
- George Bell replaced Arav Shetty as an injury substitute for Lancashire.
- Points: Durham 20, Lancashire 6.

24–26 April 2026
Scorecard

Kent	v	Worcestershire (H)
196 (71.5 overs); Matt Milnes 50* (61); Oliver Hannon-Dalby 3/27 (18 overs)		447 (121 overs); Brett D'Oliveira 90 (135); Matt Milnes 4/81 (25 overs)
249 (67.1 overs); Chris Benjamin 77 (105); Tom Taylor 5/56 (16 overs)

Worcestershire won by an innings and 2 runs
New Road, Worcester
Umpires: Paul Baldwin and Simon Widdup

- Kent won the toss and elected to bat.
- Ben Dawkins replaced Ben Compton as an injury substitute for Kent.
- Points: Worcestershire 23, Kent 2.

=== May ===
1–4 May 2026
Scorecard

Kent (H)	v	Derbyshire
352 (89 overs); Daniel Bell-Drummond 129 (142); Rory Haydon 5/82 (23 overs)		304 (66 overs); Luis Reece 84 (104); Keith Dudgeon 4/78 (21 overs)
335 (92.2 overs); Chris Benjamin 123 (187); Rory Haydon 5/81 (24 overs)		158 (52.1 overs); Luis Reece 67 (88); Matt Milnes 6/12 (15 overs)

Kent won by 225 runs
St Lawrence Ground, Canterbury
Umpires: Tom Lungley and James Tredwell

- Derbyshire won the toss and elected to field.
- No play was possible for most of the period after tea on day 2 due to rain and wet outfield.
- Rory Haydon (Derbyshire) took his maiden five-wicket haul in first-class cricket.
- Points: Kent 22, Derbyshire 5.

1–3 May 2026
Scorecard

Worcestershire	v	Northamptonshire (H)
306 (79.1 overs); Gareth Roderick 164* (212); Ben Sanderson 4/78 (20 overs)		597/7d (152 overs); James Sales 146* (209); Tom Taylor 3/97 (30 overs)
114 (44.1 overs); Adam Hose 33 (52); Ben Sanderson 7/31 (17 overs)

Northamptonshire won by an innings and 177 runs
County Ground, Northampton
Umpires: Neil Pratt and Sue Redfern

- Worcestershire won the toss and elected to bat.
- The match was scheduled for four days but completed in three.
- Points: Northamptonshire 22, Worcestershire 4.

1–4 May 2026
Scorecard

Middlesex (H)	v	Durham
430 (141 overs); Ryan Higgins 131 (273); Ben Raine 5/58 (32 overs)		567 (141.5 overs); David Bedingham 147 (226); Ryan Higgins 4/117 (35 overs)
146/4 (50 overs); Max Holden 77* (162); Ben Raine 3/23 (12 overs)

Match drawn
Lord's, London
Umpires: Anthony Harris and Martin Saggers

- Middlesex won the toss and elected to bat.
- Luke Robinson (Durham) made his first-class debut.
- Points: Durham 14, Middlesex 11.

8–11 May 2026
Scorecard

Derbyshire (H)	v	Northamptonshire
604/7d (148.5 overs); Brooke Guest 141 (174); Harry Conway 3/102 (24 overs)		228 (95.5 overs); Calvin Harrison 107 (269); Ben Aitchison 4/55 (22 overs)
		263 (122 overs) (f/o); George Bartlett 65* (175); Zak Chappell 4/53 (25 overs)

Derbyshire won by an innings and 113 runs
County Ground, Derby
Umpires: James Tredwell and Paul Baldwin

- Derbyshire won the toss and elected to bat.
- Points: Derbyshire 23, Northamptonshire 1.

8–11 May 2026
Scorecard

Gloucestershire (H)	v	Kent
325 (91.1 overs); Ben Charlesworth 85 (148); James Taylor 6/52 (23.1 overs)		327 (98 overs); Tawanda Muyeye 90 (141); Will Williams 4/48 (24 overs)
262 (85.1 overs); Cameron Bancroft 83 (195); James Taylor 4/54 (20.1 overs)		261/8 (70.4 overs); Tawanda Muyeye 108 (129); Gabe Bell 4/87 (22 overs)

Kent won by 2 wickets
County Ground, Bristol
Umpires: Chris Watts and Simon Widdup

- Kent won the toss and elected to field.
- Points: Kent 18, Gloucestershire 5. (Note: Kent were deducted a total of 3 points for maintaining a slow over-rate.)

8–10 May 2026
Scorecard

Worcestershire (H)	v	Durham
308 (111.4 overs); Jack Home 63* (106); Ben Raine 5/63 (30.4 overs)		268 (74.3 overs); David Bedingham 83 (124); Matthew Waite 3/43 (13 overs)
102 (39.5 overs); Jake Libby 28 (46); Callum Parkinson 5/13 (10 overs)		143/1 (24.2 overs); Ben McKinney 87* (71); Tom Taylor 1/26 (5 overs)

Durham won by 9 wickets
New Road, Worcester
Umpires: Hassan Adnan and James Middlebrook

- Durham won the toss and elected to field.
- Harry Darley (Worcestershire) made his first-class debut.
- The match was scheduled for four days but completed in three.
- Points: Durham 20, Worcestershire 5.

8–10 May 2026
Scorecard

Lancashire (H)	v	Middlesex
201 (67.2 overs); Keaton Jennings 67 (148); Sebastian Morgan 3/41 (14.2 overs)		169 (43.2 overs); Leus du Plooy 67 (89); James Anderson 4/67 (16 overs)
84 (38.4 overs); Keaton Jennings 18 (49); Naavya Sharma 4/17 (4.4 overs)		117/4 (21.5 overs); Ben Geddes 73* (70); George Balderson 2/23 (8 overs)

Middlesex won by 6 wickets
Old Trafford, Manchester
Umpires: Graham Lloyd and Naeem Ashraf

- Middlesex won the toss and elected to field.
- Caleb Falconer (Middlesex) made his first-class debut.
- Harry Duke replaced Joe Cracknell as an injury substitute for Middlesex.
- The match was scheduled for four days but completed in three.
- Points: Middlesex 19, Lancashire 3.

15–18 May 2026
Scorecard

Kent (H)	v	Durham
523 (132.5 overs); Ben Dawkins 180 (302); Matthew Potts 6/92 (28.5 overs)		446 (111.5 overs); Ben Raine 106 (134); Ekansh Singh 3/62 (10 overs)
1/1d (1.3 overs); Zak Crawley 1* (2); Graham Clark 1/1 (0.3 overs)

Match drawn
County Cricket Ground, Beckenham
Umpires: Mark Newell and Ben Peverall

- Kent won the toss and elected to bat.
- No play was possible on Day 3 due to rain and wet outfield.
- Will Rhodes replaced Ben McKinney as an injury substitute for Durham.
- Points: Kent 16, Durham 14

15–18 May 2026
Scorecard

Gloucestershire (H)	v	Northamptonshire
154 (51.5 overs); Ollie Price 50* (146); Ben Sanderson 5/47 (19 overs)		127 (51.3 overs); Luke Procter 38 (105); Matthew Taylor 5/36 (14.3 overs)
221 (67.2 overs); Cameron Bancroft 82 (140); Harry Conway 3/42 (19 overs)		251/8 (78.1 overs); Louis Kimber 66 (69); Gabe Bell 2/42 (12 overs)

Northamptonshire won by 2 wickets
County Ground, Bristol
Umpires: Hassan Adnan and James Tredwell

- Northamptonshire won the toss and elected to field.
- Louis Kimber and Luke Charlesworth replaced Saif Zaib and Gabe Bell as an injury substitute for, respectively, Northamptonshire and Gloucestershire.
- Points: Northamptonshire 19, Gloucestershire 3.

15–18 May 2026
Scorecard

Middlesex (H)	v	Derbyshire
177 (60.5 overs); Sam Robson 31 (71); Ben Aitchison 5/47 (20 overs)		376 (98.4 overs); Wayne Madsen 119 (161); Ryan Higgins 4/98 (30 overs)
320 (99.5 overs); Leus du Plooy 95 (117); Ben Aitchison 3/67 (27 overs)		124/3 (39.5 overs); Harry Came 34 (85); Naavya Sharma 2/34 (7 overs)

Derbyshire won by 7 wickets
Lord's, London
Umpires: Richard Illingworth and Simon Widdup

- Derbyshire won the toss and elected to field.
- Points: Derbyshire 22, Middlesex 3.

15–18 May 2026
Scorecard

Worcestershire	v	Lancashire (H)
270 (82.4 overs); Matthew Waite 77 (131); George Balderson 3/62 (19 overs)		281/8d (87 overs); Keaton Jennings 69 (172); Beyers Swanepoel 3/81 (23 overs)
211/5 (70 overs); Daniel Lategan 48 (129); James Anderson 2/27 (15 overs)

Match drawn
Trafalgar Road Ground, Southport
Umpires: Jack Shantry and Chris Watts

- Lancashire won the toss and elected to field.
- No play was possible on Day 2 due to rain and wet outfield.
- Points: Lancashire 12, Worcestershire 11

=== June ===
12–15 June 2026
Scorecard

Northamptonshire (H)	v	Gloucestershire
465 (117.5 overs); Saif Zaib 142 (163); Kristian Clarke 6/109 (27 overs)		268 (86.1 overs); Graeme van Buuren 76 (163); Liam Guthrie 4/50 (13 overs)
191/3 (33.5 overs); Calvin Harrison 92* (100); Daaryoush Ahmed 1/15 (3 overs)		387 (118.2 overs) (f/o); James Bracey 148* (229); James Sales 3/57 (13.2 overs)

Northamptonshire won by 7 wickets
County Ground, Northampton
Umpires: Chris Watts and Hassan Adnan

- Gloucestershire won the toss and elected to field.
- Points: Northamptonshire 24, Gloucestershire 3

12–14 June 2026
Scorecard

Kent	v	Lancashire (H)
178 (69 overs); Ben Dawkins 54 (118); Liam Livingstone 5/55 (18 overs)		87 (32 overs); Ben McDermott 23 (43); Keith Dudgeon 6/21 (12 overs)
332 (83.5 overs); Chris Benjamin 103 (85); James Anderson 3/45 (19 overs)		283 (81.5 overs); Marcus Harris 91* (176); Hasan Mahmud 6/69 (16 overs)

Kent won by 140 runs
Stanley Park, Blackpool
Umpires: Anthony Harris and Steve O'Shaughnessy

- Lancashire won the toss and elected to field.
- Joe Moores (Lancashire) made his first-class debut.
- Points: Kent 19, Lancashire 3

12–15 June 2026
Scorecard

Middlesex	v	Worcestershire (H)
339 (108.5 overs); Leus du Plooy 85 (133); Ben Allison 4/77 (19.5 overs)		265 (76.5 overs); Matthew Waite 69 (98); Toby Roland-Jones 4/41 (17 overs)
283/6d (82 overs); Leus du Plooy 101* (165); Harry Darley 2/32 (7 overs)		216 (84 overs); Ben Allison 89 (124); Zafar Gohar 6/31 (23 overs)

Middlesex won by 141 runs
New Road, Worcester
Umpires: Ulhas Gandhe and Surendiran Shanmugam

- Worcestershire won the toss and elected to field.
- Henry Cullen (Worcestershire) made his first-class debut.
- Harry Darley replaced Adam Finch as an injury substitute for Worcestershire.
- Points: Middlesex 21, Worcestershire 4

12–14 June 2026
Scorecard

Durham (H)	v	Derbyshire
377 (120.1 overs); Ben Raine 63 (105); Ben Aitchison 5/74 (26 overs)		118 (29.4 overs); Caleb Jewell 37 (50); Kasey Aldridge 5/19 (5.4 overs)
		237 (95.3 overs) (f/o); Harry Came 105* (290); Matthew Potts 8/66 (24.3 overs)

Durham won by an innings and 22 runs
Riverside Ground, Chester-le-Street
Umpires: Naeem Ashraf and Russell Warren

- Derbyshire won the toss and elected to field.
- Harry Came (Derbyshire) carried his bat.
- Points: Durham 21, Derbyshire 2

19–22 June 2026
Scorecard

Kent (H)	v	Middlesex
416 (114.5 overs); Chris Benjamin 70 (81); Sebastian Morgan 5/104 (26 overs)		443 (102.1 overs); Max Holden 182 (243); Keith Dudgeon 4/93 (18.1 overs)
257 (74.4 overs); Daniel Bell-Drummond 60 (91); Naavya Sharma 4/40 (15 overs)		181 (60.5 overs); Zafar Gohar 66* (110); Matt Milnes 5/31 (18 overs)

Kent won by 49 runs
St Lawrence Ground, Canterbury
Umpires: Paul Baldwin and Chris Watts

- Kent won the toss and elected to bat.
- Points: Kent 21, Middlesex 7 (Note: Kent were deducted a total of 2 points for maintaining a slow over-rate.)

19–21 June 2026
Scorecard

Lancashire	v	Derbyshire (H)
161 (39.3 overs); George Balderson 37 (52); Anuj Dal 3/49 (11 overs); Mohammad Abbas 3/49 (13 overs)		364 (85.4 overs); Matt Montgomery 86 (133); Mitchell Stanley 5/80 (20 overs)
226 (81.2 overs); Marcus Harris 58 (124); Ben Aitchison 5/49 (22 overs)		25/1 (8.5 overs); Luis Reece 19* (38); George Balderson 1/15 (4.5 overs)

Derbyshire won by 9 wickets
County Ground, Derby
Umpires: Ben Peverall and Neil Pratt

- Derbyshire won the toss and elected to field.
- Points: Derbyshire 22, Lancashire 3

19–22 June 2026
Scorecard

Gloucestershire	v	Worcestershire (H)
289 (106 overs); Miles Hammond 139* (309); Beyers Swanepoel 5/65 (24 overs)		388 (148.4 overs); Ethan Brookes 66 (233); Graeme van Buuren 4/96 (48.4 overs)
185 (81.1 overs); Cameron Bancroft 56 (145); Fateh Singh 5/74 (25 overs)		87/5 (25.1 overs); Beyers Swanepoel 35 (38); Graeme van Buuren 4/36 (13 overs)

Worcestershire won by 5 wickets
New Road, Worcester
Umpires: Steve O'Shaughnessy and Simon Widdup

- Gloucestershire won the toss and elected to bat.
- Points: Worcestershire 20, Gloucestershire 3

19–22 June 2026
Scorecard

Northamptonshire	v	Durham (H)
450 (116.4 overs); Ricardo Vasconcelos 187 (295); Ben Raine 3/63 (23 overs)		405 (97.4 overs); Ben Stokes 95 (118); Harry Conway 4/61 (22 overs)
250 (82.2 overs); Gus Miller 61 (86); Matthew Potts 4/77 (23 overs)		296/4 (78.2 overs); David Bedingham 109* (158); Liam Guthrie 1/21 (4 overs)

Durham won by 6 wickets
Riverside Ground, Chester-le-Street
Umpires: Michael Gough and James Tredwell

- Durham won the toss and elected to field.
- Gus Miller replaced Luke Procter as an injury substitute for Northamptonshire.
- Colin Ackermann replaced Ben Stokes for Durham on day 3 due to an international call-up.
- Points: Durham 23, Northamptonshire 7

=== August ===
20–23 August 2026
Scorecard

Kent	v	Middlesex (H)
350 (91.3 overs); Sam Northeast 87 (166); Toby Roland-Jones 5/71 (27 overs)		249 (55.4 overs); Eathan Bosch 43* (52); Matt Milnes 5/53 (16 overs)
254 (68.4 overs); Ben Compton 65 (141); Tom Helm 3/31 (15.4 overs)		309 (73.4 overs); Joe Cracknell 65* (97); Ekansh Singh 3/62 (13 overs)

Kent won by 46 runs
Merchant Taylors' School, Northwood
Umpires: Mark Newell and Surendiran Shanmugam

- Kent won the toss and elected to bat.
- Noah Cornwell replaced Eathan Bosch as an injury substitute for Middlesex.
- Points: Kent 22, Middlesex 3

20–22 August 2026
Scorecard

Durham	v	Derbyshire (H)
283 (94 overs); Graham Clark 64 (77); Ben Aitchison 5/70 (28 overs)		156 (52.4 overs); Caleb Jewell 28 (49); Wayne Madsen 28 (35); Matthew Potts 5/46 (18.4 overs)
295/6d (61 overs); Ben McKinney 140 (162); Shoaib Bashir 3/77 (16 overs)		84 (25.3 overs); Martin Andersson 28 (44); Ben Stokes 5/17 (7.3 overs)

Durham won by 338 runs
County Ground, Derby
Umpires: Hassan Adnan and David Millns

- Derbyshire won the toss and elected to field.
- Points: Durham 20, Derbyshire 3

20–23 August 2026
Scorecard

Northamptonshire	v	Lancashire (H)
284 (89.2 overs); George Bartlett 92 (151); George Balderson 4/70 (26.2 overs)		137 (47.4 overs); Arav Shetty 37 (47); Ben Sanderson 4/39 (18 overs)
298/4d (64 overs); Ricardo Vasconcelos 100 (131); Noman Ali 2/109 (18 overs)		129 (52.2 overs); Ben Walkden 22* (54); Calvin Harrison 2/18 (8.2 overs)

Northamptonshire won by 316 runs
Old Trafford, Manchester
Umpires: Naeem Ashraf and Chris Watts

- Lancashire won the toss and elected to field.
- Ben Walkden (Lancashire) made his first-class debut.
- Points: Northamptonshire 20, Lancashire 3

20–23 August 2026
Scorecard

Gloucestershire (H)	v	Worcestershire
150 (59.5 overs); Tommy Boorman 60 (114); Ben Allison 5/19 (17.5 overs)		267 (89.2 overs); Brett D'Oliveira 83 (183); Sai Kishore 4/76 (30.2 overs)
395/7d (114 overs); James Bracey 127 (151); Beyers Swanepoel 4/49 (22 overs)		281/2 (55.1 overs); Dan Lategan 144 (163); Ed Middleton 2/63 (11.1 overs)

Worcestershire won by 8 wickets
College Ground, Cheltenham
Umpires: Ben Peverall and Alex Wharf

- Gloucestershire won the toss and elected to bat.
- Aman Rao (Gloucestershire) made his first-class debut.
- Rehaan Edavalath replaced Gareth Roderick as an injury substitute for Worcestershire.
- Points: Worcestershire 20, Gloucestershire 3

27–30 August 2026
Scorecard

Derbyshire (H)	v	Middlesex
131 (49.1 overs); Caleb Jewell 33 (89); Naavya Sharma 4/36 (12 overs)		forfeit
111/3 (37 overs); Matt Montgomery 38* (62); Toby Roland-Jones 2/24 (9 overs)

Match drawn
County Ground, Derby
Umpires: Paul Baldwin and Simon Widdup

- Middlesex won the toss and elected to field.
- No play was possible on day 1 and 3 due to rain.
- Will Rogers (Derbyshire) made his first-class debut.
- Points: Middlesex 11, Derbyshire 8

27–30 August 2026
Scorecard

Northamptonshire (H)	v	Kent
345 (91.3 overs); Zak Crawley 89 (120); Luke Procter 2/42 (10.3 overs)		450/6d (97.1 overs); Ricardo Vasconcelos 119 (164); Grant Stewart 2/57 (19 overs)

Match drawn
County Ground, Northampton
Umpires: Hassan Adnan and Paul Pollard

- Northamptonshire won the toss and elected to field.
- No play was possible on day 3 due to rain.
- Points: Northamptonshire 16, Kent 12

27–30 August 2026
Scorecard

Lancashire	v	Worcestershire (H)
180 (61.2 overs); Keaton Jennings 55 (117); Beyers Swanepoel 4/37 (10.2 overs)		263/7d (62 overs); Beyers Swanepoel 63* (55); George Balderson 4/78 (19 overs)
2/0 (2 overs); Keaton Jennings 2* (9)

Match drawn
New Road, Worcester
Umpires: Michael Gough and Ben Peverall

- Worcestershire won the toss and elected to field.
- No play was possible on day 1 and 3 due to rain.
- Points: Worcestershire 12, Lancashire 10

27–30 August 2026
Scorecard

Gloucestershire	v	Durham (H)
137 (42 overs); James Bracey 60 (90); Kasey Aldridge 5/16 (5 overs)		384 (88.1 overs); David Bedingham 122 (126); JT Langridge 3/89 (20.1 overs)
250 (77.3 overs); Miles Hammond 58 (106); Kasey Aldridge 4/47 (15 overs)		4/0 (1 over); Matthew Potts 4* (6)

Durham won by 10 wickets
Riverside Ground, Chester-le-Street
Umpires: Steve O'Shaughnessy and James Tredwell

- Durham won the toss and elected to field.
- JT Langridge (Gloucestershire) made his first-class debut.
- Points: Durham 22, Gloucestershire 3

=== September ===
2–5 September 2026
Scorecard

Gloucestershire (H)	v	Derbyshire
237 (81.2 overs); James Bracey 113 (166); Brett Randell 5/41 (17.2 overs)		278 (89.4 overs); Yousaf Bin Naeem 71 (119); Ollie Price 6/45 (21.4 over)
359/5d (100 overs); Miles Hammond 118 (213); Martin Andersson 2/43 (8 overs)		105 (38.4 overs); Martin Andersson 35 (56); Sai Kishore 5/20 (18 overs)

Gloucestershire won by 213 runs
County Ground, Bristol
Umpires: Naeem Ashraf and Paul Pollard

- Gloucestershire won the toss and elected to bat.
- Yousaf Bin Naeem (Derbyshire) made his first-class debut.
- Points: Gloucestershire 19, Derbyshire 4

2–5 September 2026
Scorecard

Kent (H)	v	Worcestershire
238 (64.2 overs); Daniel Bell-Drummond 52 (93); Tom Taylor 3/55 (14.2 overs)		217 (59 overs); Dan Lategan 59 (119); Hasan Mahmud 4/68 (18 overs)
358 (108.2 overs); Sam Northeast 132 (241); Tom Taylor 4/68 (22 overs)		295 (84.2 overs); Brett D'Oliveira 103* (221); Hasan Mahmud 3/51 (20 overs); Matt Milnes 3/51 (16.2 overs)

Kent won by 84 runs
St Lawrence Ground, Canterbury
Umpires: Hassan Adnan and Sue Redfern

- Worcestershire won the toss and elected to field.
- Points: Kent 19, Worcestershire 3

2–5 September 2026
Scorecard

Durham	v	Northamptonshire (H)
205 (56.2 overs); David Bedingham 81 (91); Yuzvendra Chahal 4/36 (15.2 overs)		263 (88 overs); James Sales 69 (135); Matthew Potts 4/49 (21 overs)
261 (84.5 overs); Alex Lees 80 (144); Yuzvendra Chahal 5/84 (26.5 overs)		50 (22.2 overs); Louis Kimber 8 (15); Callum Parkinson 6/20 (11 overs)

Durham won by 153 runs
County Ground, Northampton
Umpires: Tom Lungley and Ben Peverall

- Durham won the toss and elected to bat.
- Points: Durham 19, Northamptonshire 4

2–4 September 2026
Scorecard

Middlesex (H)	v	Lancashire
247 (68.3 overs); Luke Hollman 54 (116); James Anderson 3/40 (19 overs)		151 (48.5 overs); Matthew Hurst 46 (108); Tom Helm 4/40 (13 overs)
200 (44 overs); Max Holden 51 (60); George Balderson 5/54 (16 overs)		136 (43.4 overs); Keaton Jennings 38 (72); Matthew Hurst 38 (90); Tom Helm 4/36 (15 overs)

Middlesex won by 160 runs
Merchant Taylors' School, Northwood
Umpires: Jack Shantry and Simon Widdup

- Middlesex won the toss and elected to bat.
- Points: Middlesex 19, Lancashire 3

8–11 September 2026
Scorecard

Derbyshire (H)	v	Kent
300 (87.5 overs); Martin Andersson 129* (190); Hasan Mahmud 4/30 (15.5 overs)		219 (73.2 overs); Bertie Foreman 49 (87); Ben Aitchison 4/58 (21 overs)
352/8d (90.4 overs); Brooke Guest 75* (95); Hasan Mahmud 3/32 (16 overs)		252 (95.3 overs); Grant Stewart 65 (104); Ben Aitchison 5/44 (20 overs)

Derbyshire won by 181 runs
County Ground, Derby
Umpires: Naeem Ashraf and Surendiran Shanmugam

- Kent won the toss and elected to field.
- Points: Derbyshire 21, Kent 3

8–10 September 2026
Scorecard

Worcestershire (H)	v	Northamptonshire
200 (67.1 overs); Henry Cullen 64 (105); Luke Procter 5/63 (20 overs)		289 (85.3 overs); Saif Zaib 110 (150); Matthew Waite 3/31 (16 overs)
182 (73.5 overs); Brett D'Oliveira 64 (160); Yuzvendra Chahal 4/46 (18.5 overs)		96/4 (25.4 overs); Saif Zaib 24 (28); Usama Mir 3/34 (7 overs)

Northamptonshire won by 6 wickets
New Road, Worcester
Umpires: Neil Pratt and James Tredwell

- Northamptonshire won the toss and elected to field.
- Points: Northamptonshire 20, Worcestershire 3

8–11 September 2026
Scorecard

Durham (H)	v	Middlesex
252 (73.4 overs); Ben Raine 58* (73); Sebastian Morgan 4/78 (16 overs)		203 (56 overs); Max Holden 43 (78); Brydon Carse 5/72 (19 overs)
374 (100.2 overs); Ben McKinney 184 (250); Ryan Higgins 4/79 (23 overs)		330 (78 overs); Harry Duke 100* (127); Brydon Carse 4/116 (21 overs)

Durham won by 93 runs
Riverside Ground, Chester-le-Street
Umpires: Sue Redfern and Martin Saggers

- Middlesex won the toss and elected to field.
- Points: Durham 20, Middlesex 3

8–11 September 2026
Scorecard

Gloucestershire	v	Lancashire (H)
212 (80.2 overs); Daaryoush Ahmed 51 (120); George Balderson 4/44 (21 overs)		134 (35.5 overs); George Balderson 39 (33); Will Williams 6/24 (13.5 overs)
169 (61 overs); Kamran Dhariwal 66 (146); George Balderson 4/31 (17 overs)		142 (41.4 overs); Rocky Flintoff 65 (79); JT Langridge 5/51 (11.4 overs)

Gloucestershire won by 105 runs
Old Trafford, Manchester
Umpires: Anthony Harris and Chris Watts

- Gloucestershire won the toss and elected to bat.
- Kamran Dhariwal (Gloucestershire) made his first-class debut.
- Points: Gloucestershire 19, Lancashire 3

15–18 September 2026
Scorecard

Durham (H)	v	Worcestershire
465 (107.5 overs); Mayank Agarwal 177 (220); Matthew Waite 3/64 (24 overs)		448 (131.3 overs); Adam Hose 105 (239); Ben Stokes 6/94 (31.3 overs)
235 (60.1 overs); Ben McKinney 38 (49); Ben Allison 3/60 (16 overs)		32/1 (9.3 overs); Daniel Lategan 16* (22); Ben Raine 1/13 (5 overs)

Match drawn
Riverside Ground, Chester-le-Street
Umpires: Anthony Harris and Chris Watts

- Worcestershire won the toss and elected to field.
- George O'Connor and Fateh Singh replaced Ben Gibbon and Usama Mir as injury substitutes for Worcestershire.
- Points: Durham 15, Worcestershire 14

15–18 September 2026
Scorecard

Derbyshire	v	Northamptonshire (H)
372 (83.4 overs); Wayne Madsen 151 (217); Liam Guthrie 3/66 (13 overs)		310 (105.4 overs); Ricardo Vasconcelos 58 (134); Brett Randell 3/48 (20 overs)
286 (77.1 overs); Martin Andersson 62 (81); Liam Guthrie 3/61 (12 overs)		326/6 (89.4 overs); Ricardo Vasconcelos 132 (232); Brett Randell 3/54 (15 overs)

Match drawn
County Ground, Northampton
Umpires: Sue Redfern and Simon Widdup

- Northamptonshire won the toss and elected to field.
- Nick Potts replaced Ben Aitchison as an injury substitute for Derbyshire.
- Points: Northamptonshire 13, Derbyshire 12. (Note: Derbyshire were deducted a total of 2 points for maintaining a slow over-rate.)

15–18 September 2026
Scorecard

Middlesex	v	Gloucestershire (H)
326 (98.4 overs); Caleb Falconer 49 (53); JT Langridge 3/82 (20.4 overs)		296 (78.5 overs); Daaryoush Ahmed 90* (117); Luke Hollman 3/36 (5.5 overs)
361 (114.1 overs); Harry Duke 94 (116; JT Langridge 5/87 (23.1 overs)		145/9 (41 overs); Daaryoush Ahmed 42 (45); Toby Roland-Jones 4/30 (9 overs)

Match drawn
County Ground, Bristol
Umpires: Hassan Adnan and Ben Peverall

- Middlesex won the toss and elected to bat.
- Points: Middlesex 13, Gloucestershire 12

15–18 September 2026
Scorecard

Lancashire	v	Kent (H)
161 (161 overs); Michael Jones 44 (96); Khaled Ahmed 5/42 (15.5 overs)		214 (51.3 overs); Zak Crawley 84 (120); Mitchell Stanley 4/61 (13.3 overs)
192 (58.3 overs); Michael Jones 54 (92); Khaled Ahmed 3/52 (15 overs)		142/3 (34.3 overs); Sam Northeast 48* (91); Tom Bailey 2/44 (11 overs)

Kent won by 7 wickets
St Lawrence Ground, Canterbury
Umpires: Paul Baldwin and Neil Pratt

- Kent won the toss and elected to field.
- Points: Kent 19, Lancashire 3

24–26 September 2026
Scorecard

Gloucestershire	v	Kent (H)
229 (69.5 overs); James Bracey 86 (103); Matt Milnes 4/55 (16.5 overs)		353 (92.4 overs); Ben Compton 126 (244); JT Langridge 3/105 (21 overs)
241 (75.1 overs); Kamran Dhariwal 66 (115 overs); Matt Milnes 5/33 (19 overs)		120/2 (26.3 overs); Sam Northeast 49* (63); Sai Kishore 1/27 (10 overs)

Kent won by 8 wickets
St Lawrence Ground, Canterbury
Umpires: Mark Newell and Chris Watts

- Kent won the toss and elected to field.
- Points: Kent 19, Gloucestershire 3

24–26 September 2026
Scorecard

Northamptonshire	v	Middlesex (H)
103 (37 overs); James Sales 43 (79); Danru Ferns 4/29 (11 overs)		255 (54.5 overs); Ryan Higgins 115 (124); Ben Sanderson 4/68 (17 overs)
285 (105.3 overs); Saif Zaib 110 (169); Tom Helm 4/62 (24.3 overs)		134 (41.3 overs); Ben Geddes 59* (128); Harry Conway 2/13 (9 overs)

Middlesex won by 7 wickets
Lord's, London
Umpires: Paul Baldwin and Ben Debenham

- Northamptonshire won the toss and elected to bat.
- Points: Middlesex 19, Northamptonshire 3

24–26 September 2026
Scorecard

Worcestershire (H)	v	Derbyshire
214 (57 overs); Tom Taylor 39* (56); Mohammad Abbas 5/63 (17 overs)		88 (34 overs); Wayne Madsen 40 (79); Ben Allison 5/22 (11 overs)
206 (67.2 overs); Matthew Waite 74* (106); Mohammad Abbas 4/65 (28)		157 (43 overs); Luis Reece 49 (67); Ben Allison 6/42 (15 overs)

Worcestershire won by 175 runs
New Road, Worcester
Umpires: Surendiran Shanmugam and James Tredwell

- Derbyshire won the toss and elected to field.
- Points: Worcestershire 19, Derbyshire 3

24–27 September 2026
Scorecard

Durham	v	Lancashire (H)
493 (145.3 overs); Emilio Gay 141 (205); Noman Ali 6/166 (48 overs)		397/6 (151 overs); Josh Bohannon 190* (384); Callum Parkinson 4/92 (50 overs)

Match drawn
Old Trafford, Manchester
Umpires: Hassan Adnan and Sue Redfern

- Durham won the toss and elected to bat.
- Points: Durham 13, Lancashire 11
