= Harry Duke =

English cricketer (born 2001)

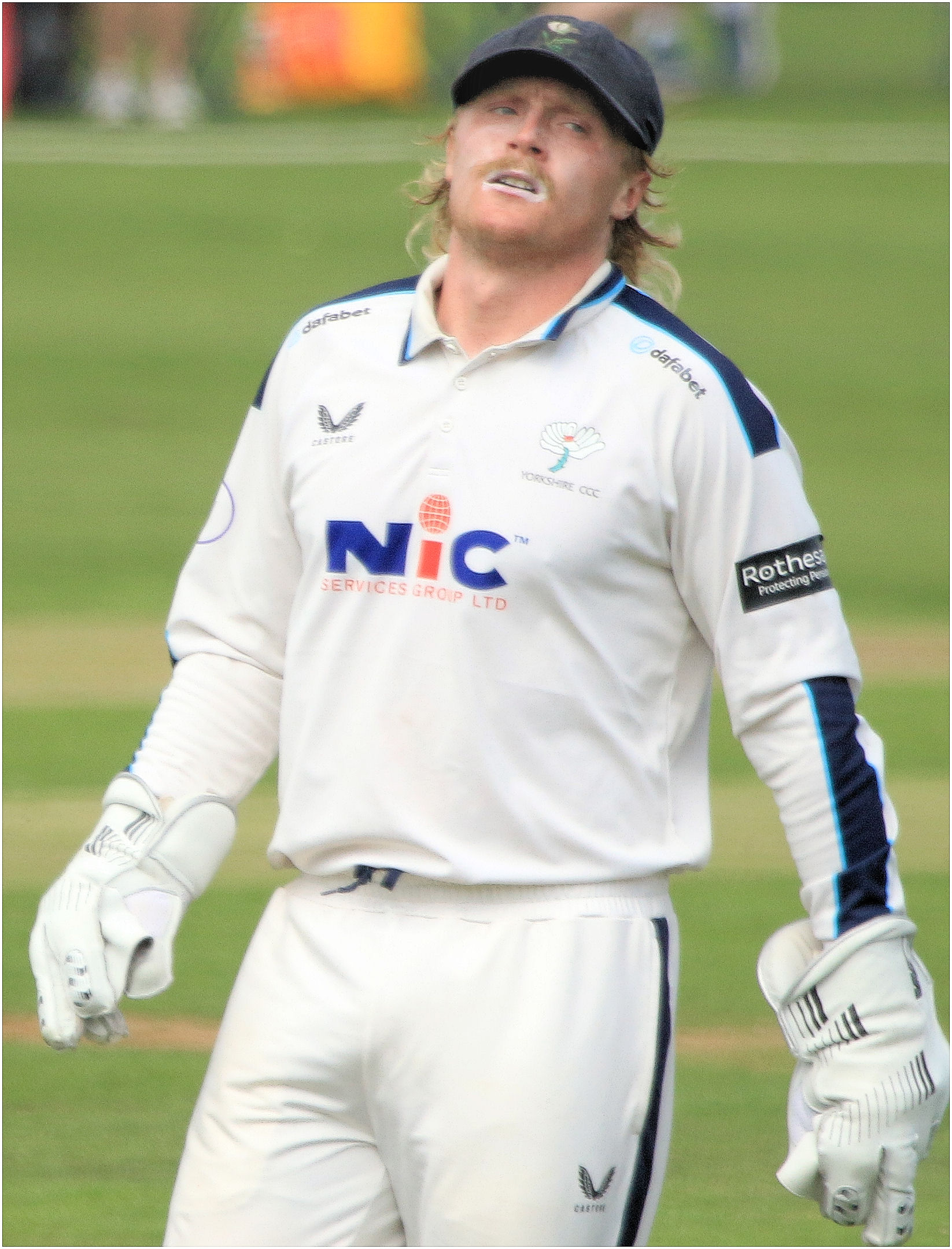
- Duke in 2025

Personal information
- Full name: Harry George Duke
- Born: 6 September 2001 (age 25); Wakefield, West Yorkshire, England
- Batting: Right-handed
- Role: Wicketkeeper

Domestic team information
- Years: Team
- 2021–2026: Yorkshire (squad no. 22)
- 2024: → Essex (on loan)
- 2026: → Middlesex (on loan)
- First-class debut: 13 May 2021 Yorkshire v Glamorgan
- List A debut: 22 July 2021 Yorkshire v Surrey

Career statistics
Competition	FC	LA	T20
Matches	28	42	11
Runs scored	926	987	43
Batting average	24.36	29.90	7.16
100s/50s	1/3	2/5	0/0
Top score	100*	125	37
Catches/stumpings	92/1	42/4	6/1
- Source: Cricinfo, 26 September 2026

Harry George Duke (born 6 September 2001) is an English cricketer who plays as a Wicketkeeper for Middlesex County Cricket Club.

== Career ==
=== Yorkshire ===
Duke made his first-class debut on 14 May 2021, for Yorkshire in the 2021 County Championship. Prior to his first-class debut, he was named in England's squad for the 2020 Under-19 Cricket World Cup. He made his Twenty20 debut on 2 July 2021, for Yorkshire in the 2021 T20 Blast. He made his List A debut on 22 July 2021, for Yorkshire in the 2021 Royal London One-Day Cup.

In April 2024, Duke joined Essex on a two-week loan.

=== Middlesex ===
In May 2026, Duke joined Middlesex on an initial two-week loan, and was immediately brought on as an injury substitute in their 2026 County Championship fixture against Lancashire. On 11 September, Duke scored his maiden first-class century with 100 not out for Middlesex against Durham. On 20 September, he played as Middlesex won the 2026 One-Day Cup final against Leicestershire. He scored 55 in a century partnership with Ryan Higgins in the first innings of the match, helping the team recover from 71-5. That month, he signed a two-year permanent contract with Middlesex.
