= Harry Darley =

English cricketer (born 2004)

Personal information
- Full name: Harry Charles Darley
- Born: 21 November 2004 (age 21); Shrewsbury, Shropshire, England
- Batting: Right-handed
- Bowling: Right-hand fast-medium

Domestic team information
- Years: Team
- 2024–2026: Worcestershire (squad no. 41)
- First-class debut: 8 May 2026 Worcestershire v Durham
- List A debut: 24 July 2024 Worcestershire v Middlesex

Career statistics
Competition	FC	LA	T20
Matches	2	8	4
Runs scored	18	9	–
Batting average	6.00	4.50	–
100s/50s	0/0	0/0	–/–
Top score	12	8	–
Balls bowled	156	318	66
Wickets	3	7	4
Bowling average	42.66	45.85	24.50
5 wickets in innings	0	0	0
10 wickets in match	0	0	0
Best bowling	2/32	3/45	2/11
Catches/stumpings	1/–	2/–	0/–
- Source: Cricinfo, 11 August 2026

Harry Charles Darley (born 21 November 2004) is an English professional cricketer who plays for Worcestershire County Cricket Club.

== Early life ==
From Shropshire, he played for Oswestry CC but moved to Shrewsbury CC in 2022. He joined the Worcestershire academy in October 2022. Darley played Birmingham League cricket for Shrewsbury and helped Worcestershire win the U18 title whilst he was part of the Worcestershire Academy.

== Career ==
He signed a rookie contract with Worcestershire in February 2024. He made his T20 debut for Worcestershire against Lancashire in July 2024. He made his One-Day Cup debut on 24 July 2024 with a home win against Middlesex, taking three wickets on debut.
