= Will Luxton =

English cricketer (born 2003)

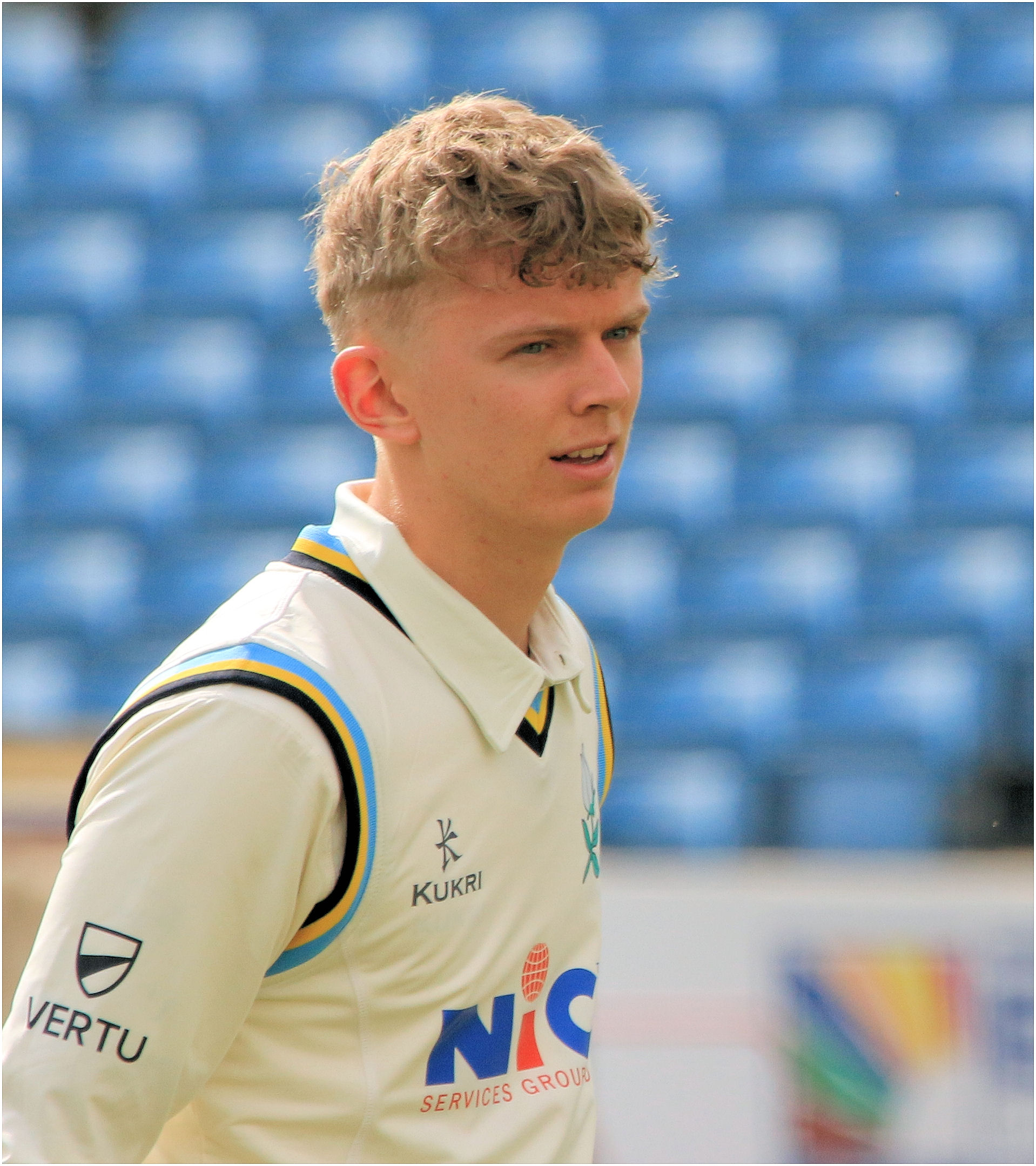
- Luxton in 2024

Personal information
- Full name: William Luxton
- Born: 6 May 2003 (age 23); Keighley, West Yorkshire, England
- Batting: Right-handed

Domestic team information
- Years: Team
- 2021–present: Yorkshire (squad no. 68)
- First-class debut: 11 July 2022 Yorkshire v Surrey
- List A debut: 28 July 2021 Yorkshire v Northamptonshire

Career statistics
Competition	FC	LA	T20
Matches	20	38	32
Runs scored	836	1,127	645
Batting average	26.96	32.20	20.80
100s/50s	1/5	3/5	0/3
Top score	167	126	90*
Catches/stumpings	11/–	13/–	14/–
- Source: Cricinfo, 26 September 2026

William Luxton (born 6 May 2003) is an English cricketer. He made his List A debut on 28 July 2021, for Yorkshire in the 2021 Royal London One-Day Cup. In December 2021, he was named in England's team for the 2022 ICC Under-19 Cricket World Cup in the West Indies. He made his first-class debut on 11 July 2022, for Yorkshire in the 2022 County Championship. He was educated at Bradford Grammar School.
