= Ben Aitchison =

English cricketer (born 1999)

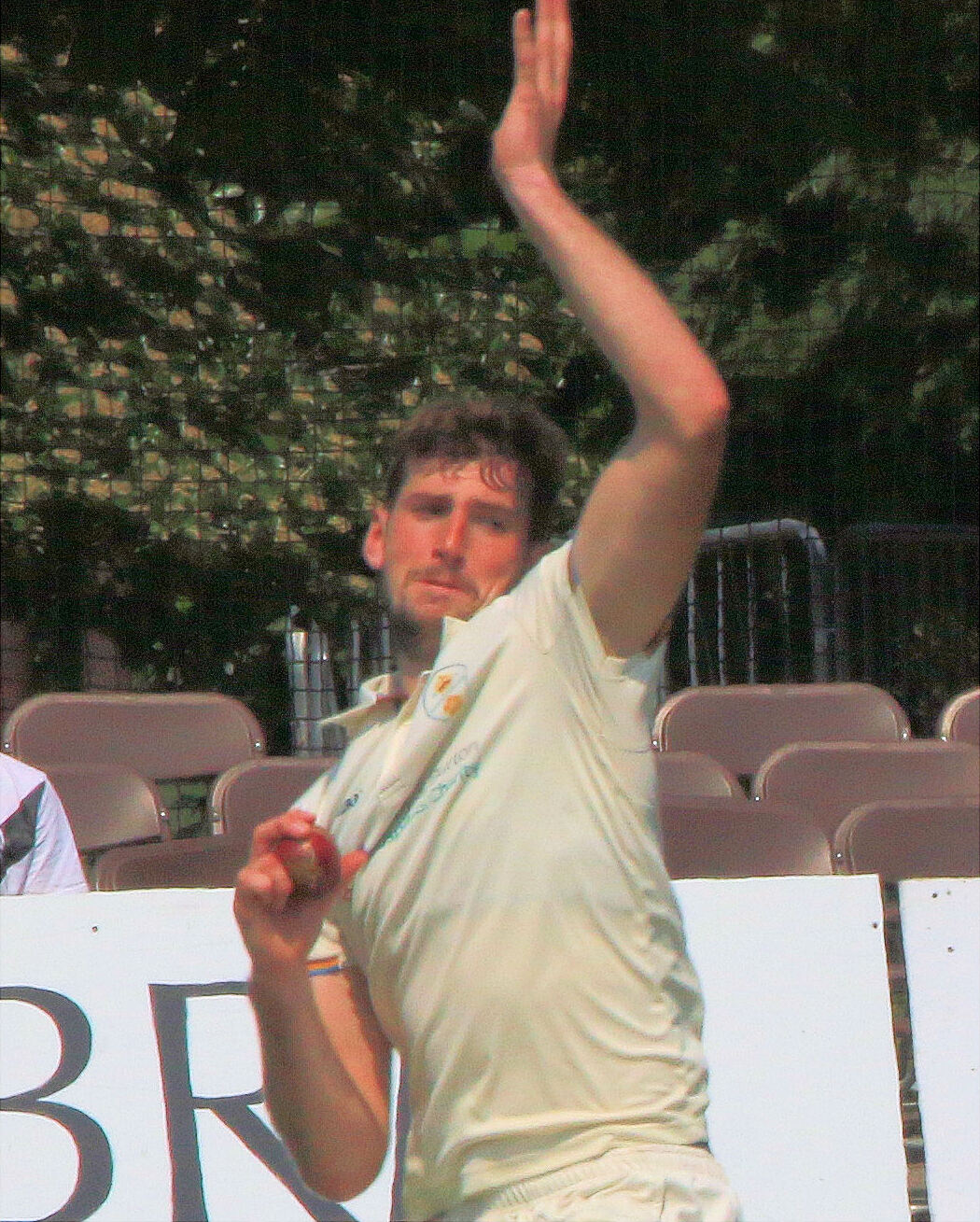
- Aitchison in 2023

Personal information
- Full name: Benjamin William Aitchison
- Born: 6 July 1999 (age 27); Southport, Merseyside, England
- Batting: Right-handed
- Bowling: Right-arm fast-medium

Domestic team information
- Years: Team
- 2020–present: Derbyshire (squad no. 11)
- FC debut: 1 August 2020 Derbyshire v Nottinghamshire
- LA debut: 22 July 2021 Derbyshire v Leicestershire

Career statistics
Competition	FC	LA	T20
Matches	47	25	21
Runs scored	1,023	122	52
Batting average	17.94	8.71	5.77
100s/50s	2/2	0/0	0/0
Top score	112	19	25*
Balls bowled	7,725	1,224	416
Wickets	145	38	28
Bowling average	26.90	27.50	27.53
5 wickets in innings	6	0	1
10 wickets in match	0	0	0
Best bowling	6/28	4/34	5/29
Catches/stumpings	37/–	4/–	4/–
- Source: Cricinfo, 27 September 2026

Benjamin William Aitchison (born 6 July 1999) is an English cricketer. He made his first-class debut on 1 August 2020, for Derbyshire in the 2020 Bob Willis Trophy. Prior to his debut, he had signed a rookie contract with Derbyshire. He made his List A debut on 22 July 2021, for Derbyshire in the 2021 Royal London One-Day Cup. He made his Twenty20 debut on 1 July 2022, for Derbyshire during India tour of England. Despite missing the entire 2024 season due to a back injury, Aitchison was given a new one-year contract by Derbyshire in November that year.
