= George Balderson =

English cricketer (born 2000)

Personal information
- Full name: George Philip Balderson
- Born: 11 October 2000 (age 26); Manchester, England
- Batting: Left-handed
- Bowling: Right-arm medium
- Role: All-rounder

Domestic team information
- Years: Team
- 2020–present: Lancashire (squad no. 10)
- FC debut: 1 August 2020 Lancashire v Leicestershire
- LA debut: 25 July 2021 Lancashire v Gloucestershire

Career statistics
Competition	FC	LA	T20
Matches	74	45	8
Runs scored	2,528	890	114
Batting average	25.53	29.66	28.50
100s/50s	2/12	1/6	0/0
Top score	116*	106*	37*
Balls bowled	10,881	2,022	138
Wickets	195	49	11
Bowling average	29.40	36.08	19.27
5 wickets in innings	3	0	0
10 wickets in match	0	0	0
Best bowling	5/14	4/58	3/31
Catches/stumpings	8/–	9/–	2/–
- Source: Cricinfo, 27 September 2026

George Philip Balderson (born 11 October 2000) is an English professional cricketer. Balderson signed his first professional contract with Lancashire in 2018. Having captained England at Under-19 level, his deal was extended in November 2019. A month later he was named as the captain of England's squad for the 2020 Under-19 Cricket World Cup. Balderson made his first-class debut on 1 August 2020, for Lancashire in the 2020 Bob Willis Trophy. He made his List A debut on 25 July 2021, for Lancashire in the 2021 Royal London One-Day Cup. Balderson signed a new contract with Lancashire in March 2026, tying him into the club until at least the end of the 2028 season.
