= George Thomas (English cricketer) =

English cricketer (born 2003)

Personal information
- Full name: George William Thomas
- Born: 14 November 2003 (age 22); Taunton, Somerset, England
- Batting: Right-handed
- Bowling: Right-arm medium
- Role: Batting all-rounder
- Relatives: Josh Thomas (brother)

Domestic team information
- Years: Team
- 2021–2024: Somerset (squad no. 64)
- 2025–2026: Sussex (squad no. 64)
- First-class debut: 8 September 2026 Sussex v Surrey
- List A debut: 10 August 2021 Somerset v Leicestershire

Career statistics
Competition	FC	LA	T20
Matches	2	26	13
Runs scored	87	649	303
Batting average	29.00	25.96	23.30
100s/50s	0/0	1/1	0/1
Top score	38*	106*	57
Balls bowled	–	384	–
Wickets	–	13	–
Bowling average	–	26.61	–
5 wickets in innings	–	0	–
10 wickets in match	–	0	–
Best bowling	–	3/41	–
Catches/stumpings	2/–	15/–	3/–
- Source: Cricinfo, 22 September 2026

George William Thomas (born 14 November 2003) is an English cricketer. He made his List A debut on 10 August 2021, for Somerset in the 2021 Royal London One-Day Cup. In December 2021, he was named in England's team for the 2022 ICC Under-19 Cricket World Cup in the West Indies.

In March 2025, Thomas was signed by Sussex County Cricket Club. On 24 August 2026, it was announced that he would be joining Worcestershire at the end of that year's county season. Thomas represented Three Bridges Cricket Club in the Sussex Cricket League in the 2025 and 2026 seasons, with multiple large scores.
