= Tom Taylor (cricketer, born 1994) =

English cricketer

Personal information
- Full name: Thomas Alex Ian Taylor
- Born: 21 December 1994 (age 31); Stoke-on-Trent, Staffordshire, England
- Batting: Right-handed
- Bowling: Right-arm medium-fast
- Role: Bowler all-rounder
- Relatives: James Taylor (brother)

Domestic team information
- Years: Team
- 2014–2018: Derbyshire (squad no. 15)
- 2018–2020: Leicestershire (squad no. 16)
- 2020: → Northamptonshire (on loan)
- 2021–2023: Northamptonshire (squad no. 12)
- 2024–: Worcestershire (squad no. 12)
- FC debut: 8 June 2014 Derbyshire v Leicestershire
- LA debut: 26 July 2014 Derbyshire v Hampshire

Career statistics
Competition	FC	LA	T20
Matches	98	47	84
Runs scored	2,547	1,202	565
Batting average	19.89	41.44	18.83
100s/50s	0/11	2/8	0/1
Top score	80	112	50*
Balls bowled	15,835	2,306	1,577
Wickets	299	54	93
Bowling average	29.32	40.07	24.79
5 wickets in innings	9	0	1
10 wickets in match	1	0	0
Best bowling	6/28	3/14	5/28
Catches/stumpings	26/–	19/–	44/–
- Source: ESPNcricinfo, 27 September 2026

Thomas Alex Ian Taylor (born 21 December 1994) is an English first-class cricketer, active since 2014, who plays for Worcestershire. Born in Stoke-on-Trent, he is a right-handed batter who bowls right arm medium-fast pace. He previously played for Derbyshire, making his debut on 8 June 2014 in the 2014 County Championship against Leicestershire. He made his Twenty20 debut on 29 August 2020, for Leicestershire in the 2020 t20 Blast. From 2021 to 2023 he played for Northamptonshire.
