= Matthew Waite =

English cricketer (born 1995)

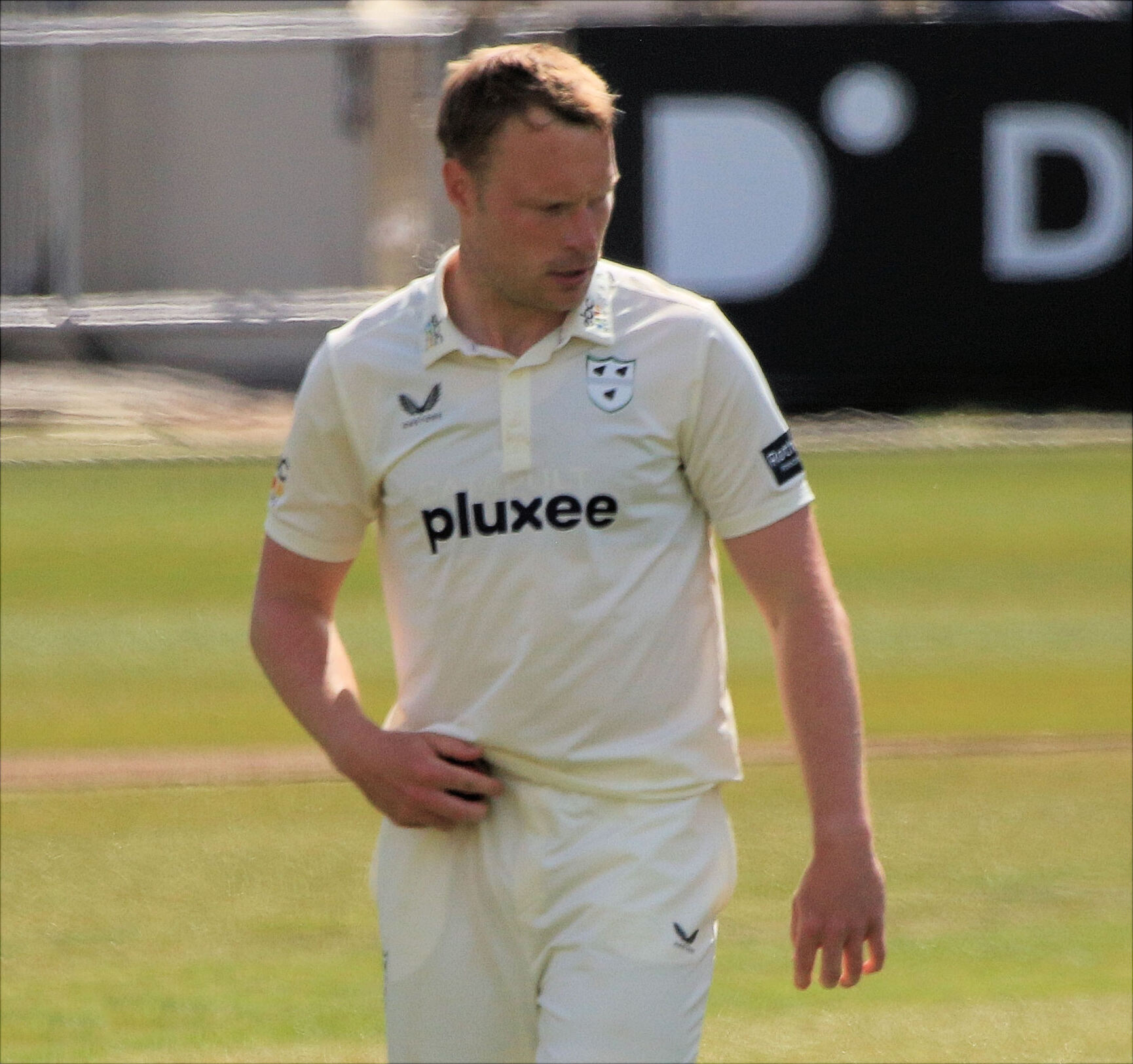
- Waite in 2025

Personal information
- Full name: Matthew James Waite
- Born: 24 December 1995 (age 30); Leeds, West Yorkshire, England
- Batting: Right-handed
- Bowling: Right-arm fast-medium
- Role: Bowler

Domestic team information
- Years: Team
- 2014–2022: Yorkshire (squad no. 6)
- 2022: → Worcestershire (on loan)
- 2023–2026: Worcestershire (squad no. 6)
- First-class debut: 9 June 2017 Yorkshire v Somerset
- List A debut: 31 July 2014 Yorkshire v Sri Lanka A

Career statistics
Competition	FC	LA	T20
Matches	64	49	54
Runs scored	2,552	917	383
Batting average	29.33	30.56	14.18
100s/50s	2/16	0/2	0/0
Top score	109*	71	40
Balls bowled	8,123	2,031	799
Wickets	152	63	52
Bowling average	28.21	29.42	23.30
5 wickets in innings	2	1	1
10 wickets in match	0	0	0
Best bowling	6/19	5/59	5/21
Catches/stumpings	17/–	7/–	10/–
- Source: CricketArchive, 27 September 2026

Matthew James Waite (born 24 December 1995) is an English cricketer who plays for Worcestershire County Cricket Club. Primarily a right-handed batsman, he also bowls right-arm fast-medium. In March 2019, in the match against Leeds/Bradford MCCU in the 2019 Marylebone Cricket Club University Matches, Waite took his maiden five-wicket haul in first-class cricket.
