= Martin Andersson (cricketer) =

English cricketer (born 1996)

Personal information
- Full name: Martin Kristoffer Andersson
- Born: 6 September 1996 (age 30); Reading, Berkshire, England
- Batting: Right-handed
- Bowling: Right-arm medium
- Role: All-rounder

Domestic team information
- Years: Team
- 2016–2024: Middlesex (squad no. 24)
- 2016–2018: Leeds/Bradford MCCU
- 2018: → Derbyshire (on loan)
- 2024: → Derbyshire (on loan)
- 2025–2026: Derbyshire (squad no. 9)
- First-class debut: 28 March 2017 Leeds/Bradford MCCU v Kent
- List A debut: 1 August 2021 Middlesex v Worcestershire

Career statistics
Competition	FC	LA	T20
Matches	61	39	71
Runs scored	2,725	1,201	1,060
Batting average	30.27	46.19	21.20
100s/50s	6/13	3/2	0/7
Top score	228	125	81*
Balls bowled	5,607	1,395	802
Wickets	104	24	45
Bowling average	32.39	65.66	30.48
5 wickets in innings	0	0	1
10 wickets in match	0	0	0
Best bowling	4/25	3/55	6/23
Catches/stumpings	43/–	18/–	38/–
- Source: ESPNcricinfo, 27 September 2026

Martin Kristoffer Andersson (born 6 September 1996) is an English cricketer. He made his first-class debut on 28 March 2017 for Leeds/Bradford MCCU against Kent as part of the Marylebone Cricket Club University fixtures. He made his Twenty20 debut for Middlesex in the 2018 t20 Blast on 17 August 2018. Before signing his first professional contract with Middlesex, he had played in the England Under 19 development squad in 2015, having hit an unbeaten 70 against Australia. Andersson began his cricket as a colt at Reading Cricket Club. He made his List A debut on 1 August 2021, for Middlesex in the 2021 Royal London One-Day Cup.
