= James Taylor (cricketer, born 2001) =

English cricketer (born 2001)

Personal information
- Full name: James Philip Arthur Taylor
- Born: 19 January 2001 (age 25); Stoke-on-Trent, Staffordshire, England
- Height: 6 ft 3 in (1.91 m)
- Batting: Right-handed
- Bowling: Right-arm fast-medium
- Role: Bowler
- Relatives: Tom Taylor (brother)

Domestic team information
- Years: Team
- 2017–2019: Derbyshire (squad no. 32)
- 2020–2026: Surrey (squad no. 25)
- 2026: → Kent (on loan)
- First-class debut: 11 August 2017 Derbyshire v West Indians
- List A debut: 23 June 2019 Derbyshire v Australia A

Career statistics
Competition	FC	LA	T20
Matches	20	25	2
Runs scored	233	111	3
Batting average	15.53	22.20	3.00
100s/50s	0/0	0/0	0/0
Top score	31*	19	3
Balls bowled	2,573	1,258	12
Wickets	43	29	1
Bowling average	35.62	42.37	34.00
5 wickets in innings	1	0	0
10 wickets in match	1	0	0
Best bowling	6/52	3/41	1/6
Catches/stumpings	4/–	4/–	0/–
- Source: Cricinfo, 27 September 2026

James Philip Arthur Taylor (born 19 January 2001) is an English cricketer. He made his first-class debut for Derbyshire against the West Indies on 11 August 2017 during their tour of England, taking the wicket of Kraigg Brathwaite. The younger brother of fellow Derbyshire player Tom Taylor, he is a product of the Derbyshire cricket academy. Taylor also played club cricket for Barlaston in the North Staffordshire and South Cheshire League during 2017, recording bowling figures of 6/4 in one innings. He signed a two-year professional contract with Derbyshire in September 2017.

He made his List A debut for Derbyshire against Australia A on 23 June 2019. He joined Surrey on a two-year contract at the conclusion of the 2019 season. He made his Twenty20 debut on 28 August 2020, for Surrey in the 2020 t20 Blast.

In May 2026, Taylor joined Kent on loan for two County Championship matches.

In July 2026, Taylor signed a three-year deal to join Yorkshire from the 2027 county season.
