= JT Langridge =

English cricketer (born 2005)

Personal information
- Full name: James Thomas Langridge
- Born: 3 November 2005 (age 21); Plymouth, Devon, England
- Batting: Left-handed
- Bowling: Left-arm fast-medium
- Role: Bowler

Domestic team information
- Years: Team
- 2023–present: Somerset (squad no. 26)
- 2026: → Gloucestershire (on loan)
- FC debut: 27 August 2026 Gloucestershire v Durham
- LA debut: 11 August 2023 Somerset v Sussex

Career statistics
Competition	FC	LA
Matches	4	11
Runs scored	57	60
Batting average	14.25	30.00
100s/50s	0/0	0/0
Top score	36	32
Balls bowled	670	441
Wickets	22	13
Bowling average	22.13	43.23
5 wickets in innings	2	0
10 wickets in match	0	0
Best bowling	5/51	3/63
Catches/stumpings	0/–	2/–
- Source: ESPNcricinfo, 26 September 2026

James Thomas Langridge (born 3 November 2005) is an English cricketer who plays for Somerset.

He made his he made his List A debut on 11 August 2023 and his first-class debut on 27 August 2026.

In August 2026, Langridge joined Gloucestershire County Cricket Club on loan.
