= Dan Lategan =

South African cricketer (born 2006)

Personal information
- Full name: Daniel Herbert Lategan
- Born: 25 May 2006 (age 20); Cape Town, South Africa
- Batting: Left-handed
- Bowling: Right-arm off-spin
- Role: Batter

Domestic team information
- Years: Team
- 2025–present: Worcestershire (squad no. 25)
- FC debut: 8 September 2025 Worcestershire v Nottinghamshire
- LA debut: 15 August 2025 Worcestershire v Derbyshire

Career statistics
Competition	FC	LA	T20
Matches	17	10	1
Runs scored	927	458	2
Batting average	30.90	50.88	2.00
100s/50s	1/4	0/4	0/0
Top score	144	78	2
Catches/stumpings	10/–	6/–	4/–
- Source: Cricinfo, 27 September 2026

Daniel Herbert Lategan (born 25 May 2006) is a South African cricketer who plays for Worcestershire County Cricket Club. He is a left-handed batsman and right-arm off-spin bowler.

== Career ==
Born in Cape Town, Lategan was among Durbanville Cricket Club’s title-winning 2024-25 Western Province Cricket Association Premier League team. He qualified for a British ancestral visa through his mother and moved from Wynberg College in South Africa to a scholarship at Brighton College in England.

Lategan joined the Worcestershire County Cricket Club academy in England at under-15 level, and after progressing through to the second-XI signed a three-year professional contract with the county in July 2025. Lategan scored an unbeaten 42 off 39 balls on his first team debut for Worcestershire in the One-Day Cup against Derbyshire on 15 August 2025. He made his maiden half-century for Worcestershire in the One-Day Cup against Surrey on 26 August 2025 to help the team reach the semi-finals of the competition. He top-scored with 78 from 82 balls for Worcestershire as they won their One-Day Cup semi-final against Somerset on 31 August 2025. Lategan made his first class debut for the county in September 2025. He later played in 2025-26 in South Africa with SA20 franchise MI Cape Town, but did not play. He struck his maiden first-class half century for Worcestershire against Derbyshire in April 2026. That year, Lategan also scored his maiden first-class century in a successful run chase against Gloucestershire, scoring 144. He also made his T20 Blast debut for the county during the 2026 season.

In November 2026, Lategan signed a three-year contract extension with Worcestershire, tying him into the club until at least the end of the 2029 season.
