= Sheridon Gumbs =

English cricketer

Personal information
- Full name: Sheridon Sohan Emanuel Gumbs
- Born: 25 May 2004 (age 22); Slough, Berkshire, England
- Batting: Left-handed
- Bowling: Right-arm leg break

Domestic team information
- Years: Team
- 2022: Surrey (squad no. 2)
- 2026: Leicestershire (squad no. 2)
- First-class debut: 12 June 2026 Leicestershire v Essex
- List A debut: 14 August 2022 Surrey v Sussex

Career statistics
Competition	FC	LA	T20
Matches	8	4	1
Runs scored	289	104	11
Batting average	24.08	26.00	11.00
100s/50s	0/1	0/1	0/0
Top score	93	66	11
Catches/stumpings	7/–	2/–	1/–
- Source: ESPNcricinfo, 26 September 2026

Sheridon Sohan Emmanuel Gumbs (born 25 May 2004) is an English cricketer who plays for Leicestershire County Cricket Club. He is a left handed batsman and a leg break bowler.

== Career ==
Gumbs joined the Surrey Academy in 2022. Previously he has been in age group cricket with the county and made his 4-day debut in Second XI cricket in 2021 against Somerset Second XI at Taunton Vale, scoring 86. He has also played for Slough Cricket Club.

He made his List A debut on 14 August 2022 against Sussex in the Royal London One-Day Cup. Gumbs made his maiden List A half century on 17 August 2022 for Surrey against Somerset at The Oval.

In December 2022 he was selected for the England national under-19 cricket team to play Australia in January 2023 under head coach Michael Yardy.

After leaving Surrey, he had trials with Hampshire. Gumbs signed a long-term contact with Leicestershire in 2026 after a trial. He his made first-class debut for Leicestershire against Essex in June 2026.

== Personal life ==
He studied sports management at Loughborough University. His older brother Shelvin Gumbs is also a cricketer.
