= Josh Thomas (English cricketer) =

English cricketer (born 2005)

Personal information
- Full name: Joshua Frederick Thomas
- Born: 11 January 2005 (age 21); Taunton, Somerset, England
- Batting: Left-handed
- Bowling: Slow left-arm orthodox
- Role: All-rounder
- Relatives: George Thomas (brother)

Domestic team information
- Years: Team
- 2022–present: Somerset (squad no. 8)
- 2025: → Leicestershire (on loan)
- First-class debut: 15 September 2025 Somerset v Hampshire
- List A debut: 14 August 2022 Somerset v Middlesex

Career statistics
Competition	FC	LA	T20
Matches	16	33	10
Runs scored	968	663	75
Batting average	37.23	31.57	15.00
100s/50s	3/5	0/5	0/0
Top score	136	97*	21
Balls bowled	108	336	72
Wickets	0	6	7
Bowling average	–	59.33	13.00
5 wickets in innings	–	0	0
10 wickets in match	–	0	0
Best bowling	–	3/40	4/6
Catches/stumpings	9/–	7/–	4/–
- Source: ESPNcricinfo, 27 September 2026

Joshua Frederick Thomas (born 11 January 2005) is an English cricketer. He made his List A debut on 14 August 2022, for Somerset in the 2022 Royal London One-Day Cup. Having appeared as a concussion substitute against Hampshire the previous week, Thomas made his maiden full First-Class debut for Somerset against Essex in the final match of the 2025 County Championship season. In May 2026, he scored his maiden First-Class century, compiling 136 in Somerset's first innings against Yorkshire. The following week he signed a two-year contract extension with Somerset, tying him into the club until at least the end of the 2028 season.
