= Tommy Boorman =

English cricketer (born 2004)

Personal information
- Full name: Thomas William Boorman
- Born: 12 April 2005 (age 21); Cheltenham, Gloucestershire, England
- Batting: Right-handed
- Bowling: Right-arm off break

Domestic team information
- Years: Team
- 2025–present: Gloucestershire (squad no. 71)
- FC debut: 17 April 2026 Gloucestershire v Lancashire
- LA debut: 5 August 2025 Gloucestershire v Derbyshire

Career statistics
Competition	FC	LA	T20
Matches	11	12	1
Runs scored	413	204	6
Batting average	19.66	25.50	6.00
100s/50s	0/1	0/0	0/0
Top score	60	39	6
Catches/stumpings	7/–	7/–	0/–
- Source: Cricinfo, 27 September 2026

Thomas William Boorman (born 12 April 2005) is an English cricketer for Gloucestershire County Cricket Club. He is a right-handed batsman and right arm offbreak bowler.

== Career ==
In 2017, at the age of 12, he scored his first century in adult cricket whilst playing for Dumbleton thirds in a Cheltenham, Gloucester and Forest League match against Down Hatherley.

An opening batsman, during the 2023 season he played for Gloucestershire against the touring New Zealand side, scoring a quickfire 21 from 13 balls. He signed a rookie contract with Gloucestershire in November 2023.

He made his T20 Blast debut for Gloucestershire against Somerset on 18 July 2025 in Taunton. He made his list-A cricket debut for Gloucestershire in the One-Day Cup against Derbyshire on 5 August 2025. His performances included a match winning partnership of 35 with Miles Hammond against Leicestershire on 10 August. He signed a new two-year contract with Gloucestershire at the conclusion of the 2025 season. Boorman made his first-class debut for Gloucestershire against Lancashire at Bristol on 17 April 2026.
