= Ethan Bamber =

English cricketer (born 1998)

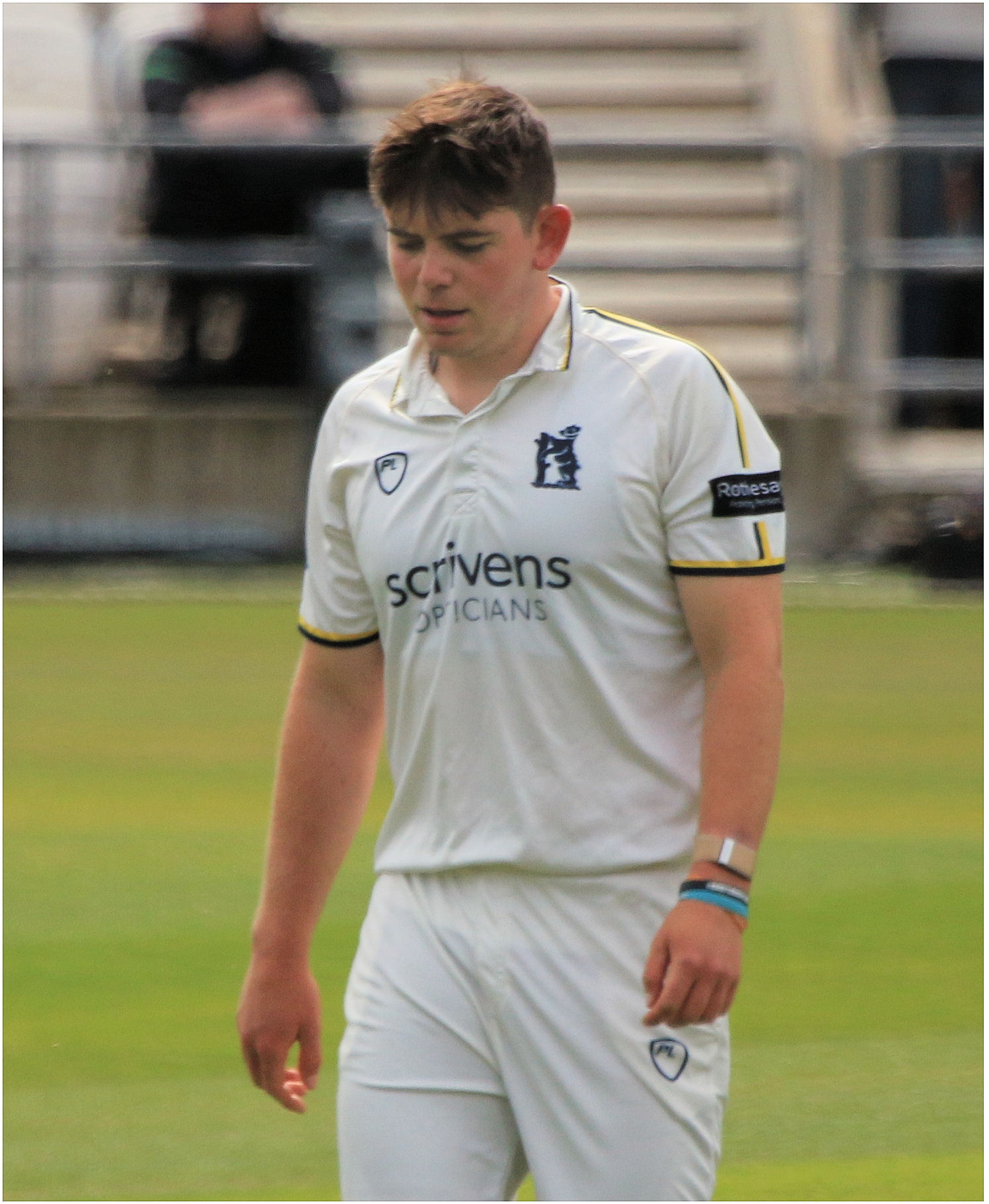
- Bamber in 2025

Personal information
- Full name: Ethan Read Bamber
- Born: 17 December 1998 (age 27); Westminster, London, England
- Batting: Right-handed
- Bowling: Right-arm fast-medium
- Role: Bowler
- Relatives: David Bamber (father)

Domestic team information
- Years: Team
- 2018–2024: Middlesex (squad no. 54)
- 2019: → Gloucestershire (on loan)
- 2025–: Warwickshire (squad no. 54)
- First-class debut: 19 August 2018 Middlesex v Northamptonshire
- List A debut: 25 July 2021 Middlesex v Essex

Career statistics
| Competition | FC | LA | T20 |
|---|---|---|---|
| Matches | 89 | 34 | 7 |
| Runs scored | 1,150 | 232 | 5 |
| Batting average | 13.52 | 12.21 | – |
| 100s/50s | 1/0 | 0/1 | 0/0 |
| Top score | 107 | 50 | 3* |
| Balls bowled | 16,852 | 1,720 | 95 |
| Wickets | 308 | 45 | 4 |
| Bowling average | 26.62 | 30.75 | 41.75 |
| 5 wickets in innings | 8 | 0 | 0 |
| 10 wickets in match | 0 | 0 | 0 |
| Best bowling | 6/26 | 4/29 | 3/29 |
| Catches/stumpings | 20/– | 8/– | 2/– |
- Source: Cricinfo, 26 September 2026

Ethan Read Bamber (born 17 December 1998) is an English cricketer. He plays domestically for Warwickshire. Bamber signed a professional contract with Middlesex in 2018. He made his first-class debut for Middlesex in the 2018 County Championship on 17 August 2018. Prior to his first-class debut, he was named in England's squad for the 2018 Under-19 Cricket World Cup.

== Career ==
Bamber was England's joint top wicket taker at the 2018 U19 Cricket World Cup in New Zealand. He finished the tournament as England's joint leading wicket taker. Bamber also toured South Africa with the England Young Lions.

He made his Twenty20 debut for Middlesex, against Leinster Lightning on 21 June 2019, during Middlesex's tour of Ireland. On 14 July 2019, Bamber joined Gloucestershire on a one-month loan, making his debut the next day in the County Championship against Leicestershire. He made his List A debut on 25 July 2021, for Middlesex in the 2021 Royal London One-Day Cup.

Bamber is nicknamed 'mini-murts' in the Middlesex team, as he was regarded as a long-term successor to Middlesex's veteran bowler Tim Murtagh. Bamber received his Middlesex county cap in May 2022.

In July 2024, he joined Warwickshire on a three-year contract to start in the 2025 season. He received his Warwickshire county cap during the 2026 season.Bamber agreed a three-year contract extension in October 2026, tying him into the club until at least the end of the 2029 season.

Bamber was named the 2026 Cricket Media Club County Championship Player of the Year after taking 69 wickets in 16 matches to help Warwickshire to win the Division One title.

== Personal life ==
The son of actor David Bamber, Ethan Bamber studied theology at Exeter University. Actors David Swift and Clive Swift were Bamber's grandfather and great-uncle respectively. He was a chorister with the Choir of St John's College, Cambridge before attending Mill Hill School, a private school in North London. He supports Arsenal FC and has regularly watched Saracens FC.
