= Michael Booth (cricketer) =

South African cricketer (born 2001)

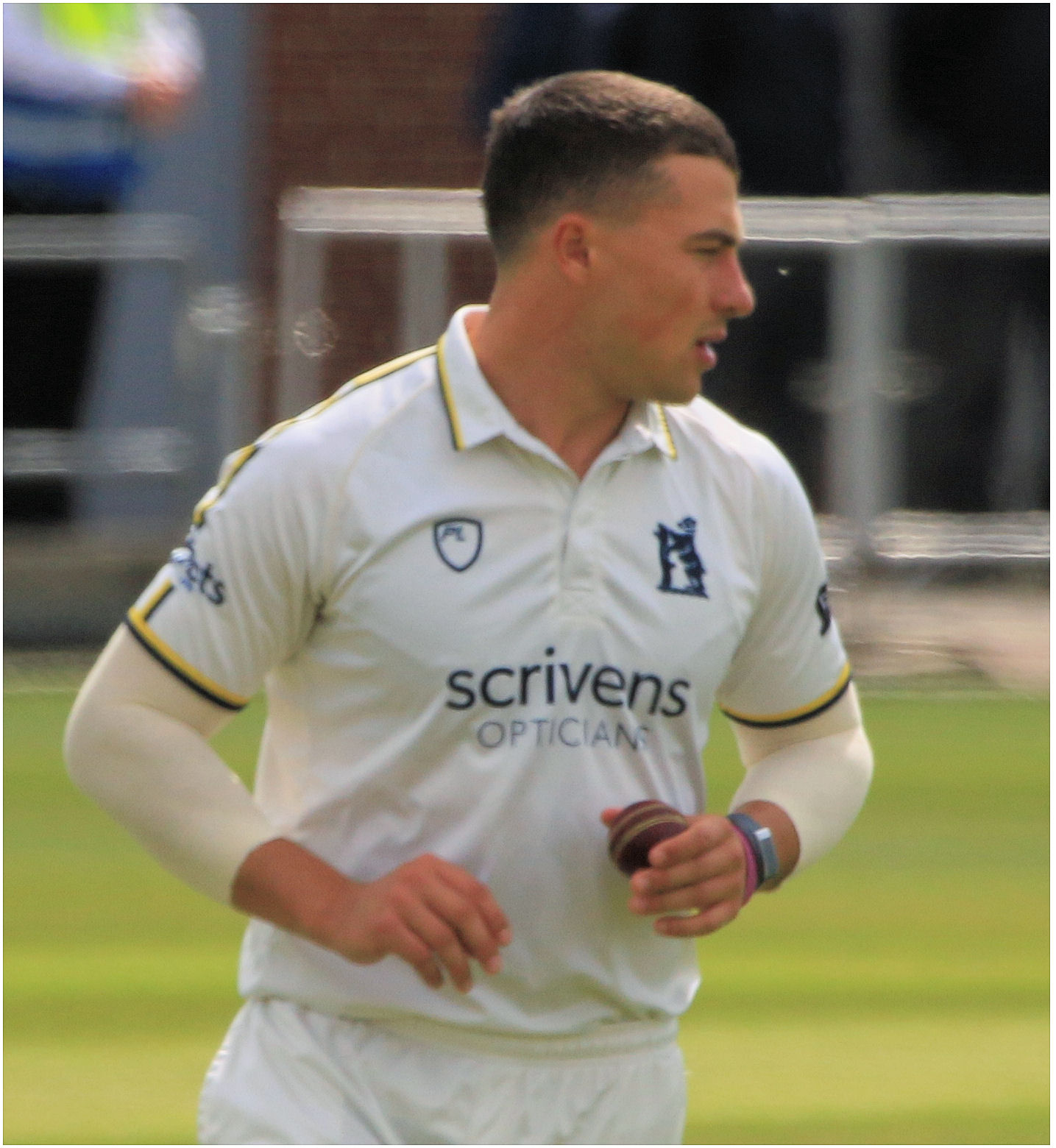
- Booth in 2025

Personal information
- Full name: Michael Gary Booth
- Born: 12 February 2001 (age 25); Harare, Zimbabwe
- Batting: Right-handed
- Bowling: Right-arm fast-medium

Domestic team information
- Years: Team
- 2019/20: KwaZulu-Natal Inland
- 2023–present: Warwickshire (squad no. 27)
- First-class debut: 5 April 2024 Warwickshire v Worcestershire
- T20 debut: 13 September 2019 KZN-Inland v SW Districts

Career statistics
Competition	FC	LA	T20
Matches	16	21	7
Runs scored	388	235	–
Batting average	24.25	26.11	–
100s/50s	0/2	0/0	–
Top score	70	45*	–
Balls bowled	2,068	909	140
Wickets	49	26	6
Bowling average	28.81	32.46	28.00
5 wickets in innings	1	0	0
10 wickets in match	0	0	0
Best bowling	5/90	3/16	2/24
Catches/stumpings	1/–	5/–	0/–
- Source: Cricinfo, 4 September 2026

Michael Gary Booth (born 12 February 2001) is a Zimbabwean-born South African cricketer, who is a right-handed batsman and a right-arm fast-medium bowler.

== Early life ==
Booth grew up in Zimbabwe and attended St. John's Preparatory School in Harare before moving to South Africa, where he was educated at Hilton College and Durham University.

== Career ==
He made his Twenty20 debut for KwaZulu-Natal Inland in the 2019–20 CSA Provincial T20 Cup on 13 September 2019. He made his List A debut for Warwickshire on 10 August 2023, against Glamorgan in the 2023 One-Day Cup. He made his first-class debut for Warwickshire on 5 April 2024, against Worcestershire in the 2024 County Championship. Booth claimed his maiden First Class five-wicket haul against Nottinghamshire in April 2025, taking 5 for 90.
