= 2023 County Championship =

Cricket tournament

- Dates: 6 April 2023 – 29 September 2023
- Administrator: England and Wales Cricket Board
- Cricket format: First-class cricket (4 days)
- Tournament format: League system
- Champions: Surrey (22nd title)
- Participants: 18
- Matches: 126
- Most runs: Josh Bohannon (1,257) (Div 1); Alex Lees (1,347) (Div 2)
- Most wickets: Brett Hutton (62) (Div 1); Ben Raine (60) (Div 2)

The 2023 County Championship (referred to as the LV= Insurance County Championship for sponsorship reasons) was the 123rd cricket County Championship season in England and Wales. As in 2022, Division One had ten teams and Division Two had eight teams. The season started on 6 April and finished on 29 September 2023. Surrey were the defending champions and retained their title in the last round of matches.

== Teams ==
The teams were split based on the finishing positions in the 2022 season. The following teams took part in the County Championship:

=== Division One ===
Team	Primary home ground	Captain	Coach
Essex	County Ground, Chelmsford	(England) Tom Westley	(England) Anthony McGrath
Hampshire	Rose Bowl, Southampton	(England) James Vince	(South Africa) Adi Birrell
Kent	St Lawrence Ground, Canterbury	(England) Sam Billings	(England) Matt Walker
Lancashire	Old Trafford, Manchester	(England) Keaton Jennings	(England) Glen Chapple
Middlesex	Lord's, London	(England) Toby Roland-Jones	(England) Richard Johnson
Northamptonshire	County Ground, Northampton	(England) Luke Procter	(England) John Sadler
Nottinghamshire	Trent Bridge, Nottingham	(England) Steven Mullaney	(England) Peter Moores
Somerset	County Ground, Taunton	(England) Tom Abell	(England) Jason Kerr
Surrey	The Oval, London	(England) Rory Burns	(England) Gareth Batty
Warwickshire	Edgbaston, Birmingham	(England) Will Rhodes	(England) Mark Robinson

Team promoted from Division Two in 2022

=== Division Two ===
Team	Primary home ground	Captain	Coach
Derbyshire	County Ground, Derby	(South Africa) Leus du Plooy	(South Africa) Mickey Arthur
Durham	Riverside Ground, Chester-le-Street	(England) Scott Borthwick	(Australia) Ryan Campbell
Glamorgan	Sophia Gardens, Cardiff	(Wales) David Lloyd	(England) Matthew Maynard
Gloucestershire	County Ground, Bristol	(South Africa) Graeme van Buuren	(South Africa) Dale Benkenstein
Leicestershire	Grace Road, Leicester	(England) Lewis Hill	(England) Paul Nixon
Sussex	County Ground, Hove	(India) Cheteshwar Pujara	(England) Paul Farbrace
Worcestershire	New Road, Worcester	(England) Brett D'Oliveira	(England) Alan Richardson
Yorkshire	Headingley, Leeds	(Pakistan) Shan Masood	(Barbados) Ottis Gibson

Team relegated from Division One in 2022

== Division One ==
=== April ===
6–9 April 2023
Scorecard

Nottinghamshire	v	Hampshire
185 (55.3 overs); Tom Moores 49* (82); Mohammad Abbas 6/49 (15.3 overs)		231 (77 overs); Fletcha Middleton 59 (113); Dane Paterson 3/39 (18 overs)
177 (69.4 overs); Ben Duckett 51 (58); Kyle Abbott 4/39 (18 overs)		132/2 (46.2 overs); Fletcha Middleton 65 (121); Luke Fletcher 1/3 (9 overs)

Hampshire won by 8 wickets
Rose Bowl, Southampton
Umpires: Graham Lloyd and Martin Saggers

- Nottinghamshire won the toss and elected to bat.
- Points: Hampshire 19, Nottinghamshire 3.

6–9 April 2023
Scorecard

Northamptonshire	v	Kent
117 (32.5 overs); Ricardo Vasconcelos 39 (70); Matt Quinn 4/25 (9.5 overs)		222 (69.4 overs); Zak Crawley 91 (171); Chris Tremain 5/44 (18 overs)
331 (117.3 overs); Rob Keogh 116* (211); Joey Evison 4/62 (25.3 overs)		227/3 (64.5 overs); Ben Compton 114* (197); Chris Tremain 2/40 (13 overs)

Kent won by 7 wickets
St Lawrence Ground, Canterbury
Umpires: Ian Blackwell and Peter Hartley

- Kent won the toss and elected to field.
- Play was restricted to 26 overs on Day 1 due to rain.
- Points: Kent 19, Northamptonshire 3.

6–9 April 2023
Scorecard

Surrey	v	Lancashire
442 (113 overs); Cameron Steel 141* (182); Tom Bailey 4/86 (25 overs)		291 (92.2 overs); Keaton Jennings 76 (156); Sean Abbott 5/50 (20 overs)
292/6d (65 overs); Ben Foakes 103* (95); Matt Parkinson 5/120 (25 overs)		247/3 (87.1 overs); Josh Bohannon 108 (187); Jordan Clark 1/25 (14 overs)

Match drawn
Old Trafford Cricket Ground, Manchester
Umpires: Neil Mallender and David Millns

- Lancashire won the toss and elected to field.
- Points: Surrey 12, Lancashire 9.

6–9 April 2023
Scorecard

Essex	v	Middlesex
266 (93.1 overs); Dan Lawrence 105 (204); Toby Roland-Jones 7/61 (27.1 overs)		170 (63.3 overs); Ryan Higgins 70 (127); Jamie Porter 6/35 (15 overs)
211 (63.2 overs); Matt Critchley 53 (80); Tim Murtagh 4/44 (15 overs)		210 (83 overs); Luke Hollman 63* (121); Sam Cook 3/31 (17 overs)

Essex won by 97 runs
Lord's, London
Umpires: Mike Burns and Richard Illingworth

- Middlesex won the toss and elected to field.
- Play was restricted to 56 overs on Day 1 due to rain.
- Points: Essex 20, Middlesex 3.

6–9 April 2023
Scorecard

Somerset	v	Warwickshire
284 (92.4 overs); Lewis Gregory 65 (111); Ed Barnard 3/54 (20 overs)		392 (109.5 overs); Sam Hain 119 (269); Jack Leach 4/119 (29 overs)
180/6 (50 overs); Tom Lammonby 66* (120); Oliver Hannon-Dalby 3/21 (11 overs)

Match drawn
County Ground, Taunton
Umpires: Rob Bailey and Alex Wharf

- Somerset won the toss and elected to bat.
- No play was possible on Day 1 due to wet outfield.
- Points: Somerset 9, Warwickshire 11.

13–16 April 2023
Scorecard

Lancashire	v	Essex
207 (64.5 overs); George Bell 60 (109); Sam Cook 5/42 (17.5 overs)		219 (68.2 overs); Matt Critchley 78 (154); James Anderson 4/70 (22 overs)
351/7d (85 overs); Keaton Jennings 96 (201); Simon Harmer 2/75 (19 overs)		128/4 (58 overs); Tom Westley 43 (120); Tom Bailey 2/28 (13 overs)

Match drawn
County Ground, Chelmsford
Umpires: Ben Debenham and Graham Lloyd

- Lancashire won the toss and elected to bat.
- Play was restricted to 36 overs on Day 3 due to rain.
- Points: Lancashire 8, Essex 8

13–16 April 2023
Scorecard

Middlesex	v	Northamptonshire
149 (48.4 overs); Ryan Higgins 70 (85); Ben Sanderson 3/19 (13 overs)		198 (74.2 overs); Rob Keogh 75* (128); Toby Roland-Jones 4/53 (19.2 overs)
167 (58.1 overs); Toby Roland-Jones 37 (29); Chris Tremain 3/41 (13 overs)		120/3 (39.3 overs); Sam Whiteman 60* (79); Ethan Bamber 1/16 (11 overs)

Northamptonshire won by 7 wickets
County Ground, Northampton
Umpires: Nigel Llong and Steve O'Shaughnessy

- Northamptonshire won the toss and elected to field.
- No play was possible on Day 2 due to rain.
- Points: Northamptonshire 19, Middlesex 3.

13–16 April 2023
Scorecard

Nottinghamshire	v	Somerset
256 (72.5 overs); Ben Duckett 75 (91); Lewis Gregory 7/84 (18.5 overs)		173 (52.3 overs); Josh Davey 60 (66); Brett Hutton 6/45 (13 overs)
211 (68.1 overs); Haseeb Hameed 34 (75); Lewis Gregory 4/64 (19.2 overs)		129 (38.2 overs); James Rew 25 (46); Dane Paterson 5/46 (11.2 overs)

Nottinghamshire won by 165 runs
Trent Bridge, Nottingham
Umpires: Mike Burns and David Millns

- Somerset won the toss and elected to field.
- No play was possible on Day 2 due to rain.
- Points: Nottinghamshire 20, Somerset 3.

13–16 April 2023
Scorecard

Hampshire	v	Surrey
254 (79.3 overs); Ben Brown 95 (167); Tom Lawes 4/58 (16 overs)		270 (85.5 overs); Ollie Pope 91 (157); Mohammad Abbas 6/64 (27.5 overs)
258 (88 overs); Nick Gubbins 84 (199); Daniel Worrall 5/40 (17 overs)		247/1 (55.2 overs); Ollie Pope 122* (102); Kylie Abbott 1/36 (11 overs)

Surrey won by 9 wickets
The Oval, London
Umpires: Russell Warren and Alex Wharf

- Hampshire won the toss and elected to bat.
- Play was restricted to 33.3 overs on Day 2 due to rain.
- Points: Surrey 20, Hampshire 4.

13–16 April 2023
Scorecard

Warwickshire	v	Kent
453/4d (107 overs); Sam Hain 165* (269); Joe Denly 1/49 (13 overs)		158 (47.1 overs); Daniel Bell-Drummond 40 (65); Hasan Ali 3/36 (9.1 overs)
		281 (93.3 overs) (f/o); Joey Evison 99 (161); Chris Rushworth 3/58 (21 overs)

Warwickshire won by an innings and 14 runs
Edgbaston, Birmingham
Umpires: Richard Illingworth and Martin Saggers

- Kent won the toss and elected to field.
- No play was possible on Day 2 due to rain.
- Points: Warwickshire 24, Kent 1.

20–23 April 2023
Scorecard

Essex	v	Kent
451/5d (97.4 overs); Nick Browne 159 (299); Wes Agar 2/67 (23 overs)		342/7 (78 overs); Zak Crawley 170 (183); Simon Harmer 4/141 (31 overs)

Match drawn
St Lawrence Ground, Canterbury
Umpires: Nigel Llong and David Millns

- Essex won the toss and elected to bat.
- Play was restricted to 42 overs on Day 1 due to rain.
- Points: Essex 12, Kent 8.

20–23 April 2023
Scorecard

Nottinghamshire	v	Middlesex
364 (99.3 overs); Ben Duckett 177 (258); Ethan Bamber 4/89 (26 overs)		274 (82 overs); Mark Stoneman 76 (130); Stuart Broad 4/68 (22 overs)
158/6d (50.5 overs); Joe Clarke 52 (94); Ethan Bamber 2/26 (14 overs)		249/6 (39 overs); Pieter Malan 61 (71); Stuart Broad 3/83 (12 overs)

Middlesex won by 4 wickets
Lord's, London
Umpires: Martin Saggers and Alex Wharf

- Middlesex won the toss and elected to field.
- Play was restricted to 69 overs on Day 1 due to rain.
- Points: Middlesex 20, Nottinghamshire 6.

20–23 April 2023
Scorecard

Hampshire	v	Northamptonshire
482/8d (129.5 overs); James Vince 186 (279); Gareth Berg 2/70 (24 overs)		149 (49.3 overs); Josh Cobb 44 (78); James Fuller 6/37 (11.3 overs)
		63 (22.3 overs) (f/o); Luke Procter 18 (32); Mohammed Abbas 4/31 (11.3 overs)

Hampshire won by an innings and 270 runs
County Ground, Northampton
Umpires: Mike Burns and James Middlebrook

- Northamptonshire won the toss and elected to field.
- Points: Hampshire 22, Northamptonshire 1.

20–23 April 2023
Scorecard

Somerset	v	Lancashire
441 (122.4 overs); Tom Abell 151 (285); James Anderson 5/76 (28 overs)		554 (111.1 overs); Keaton Jennings 189 (247); Lewis Gregory 3/81 (20 overs)
256/6 (86 overs); Kasey Aldridge 58* (108); Tom Bailey 3/49 (15 overs)

Match drawn
County Ground, Taunton
Umpires: Richard Illingworth and Russell Warren

- Lancashire won the toss and elected to field.
- Points: Somerset 10, Lancashire 12.

27–30 April 2023
Scorecard

Kent	v	Middlesex
186 (65.2 overs); Ben Compton 52 (168); Tim Murtagh 4/40 (17 overs)		229 (58.1 overs); Ryan Higgins 71 (108); Wes Agar 4/60 (15.1 overs)
128 (57 overs); Jack Leaning 48 (118); Tim Murtagh 6/42 (16 overs)		86/1 (24.3 overs); Sam Robson 41* (79); Matt Quinn 1/41 (6 overs)

Middlesex won by 9 wickets
Lord's, London
Umpires: Rob Bailey and Steve O'Shaughnessy

- Middlesex won the toss and elected to field.
- Play was restricted to 47 overs on Day 1 due to rain.
- Points: Middlesex 19, Kent 3.

27–30 April 2023
Scorecard

Warwickshire	v	Surrey
150 (56 overs); Dan Mousley 55 (132); Daniel Worrall 4/38 (17 overs)		281 (91.1 overs); Jamie Smith 88 (150); Oliver Hannon-Dalby 3/47 (17 overs)
141 (40 overs); Ed Barnard 49 (74); Kemar Roach 5/34 (13 overs)		16/1 (2 overs); Tom Lawes 14* (5); Oliver Hannon-Dalby 1/1 (1 over)

Surrey won by 9 wickets
Edgbaston, Birmingham
Umpires: Peter Hartley and Nigel Llong

- Surrey won the toss and elected to field.
- Play was restricted to 51 overs on Day 1 due to rain.
- Points: Surrey 20, Warwickshire 3.

=== May ===
4–7 May 2023
Scorecard

Essex	v	Surrey
314 (91.2 overs); Tom Westley 62 (165); Gus Atkinson 6/68 (19.2 overs)		240 (76.5 overs); Dom Sibley 48 (83); Jamie Porter 4/51 (14.5 overs)
198 (51.5 overs); Nick Browne 47 (102); Jordan Clark 4/58 (12.5 overs)		153/7 (53.4 overs); Ollie Pope 47 (58); Simon Harmer 2/6 (13 overs)

Match drawn
County Ground, Chelmsford
Umpires: Mike Burns and James Middlebrook

- Essex won the toss and elected to bat.
- Points: Essex 5, Surrey 3.

4–7 May 2023
Scorecard

Hampshire	v	Warwickshire
229 (65.4 overs); James Vince 75* (92); Chris Rushworth 3/38 (13 overs)		410/8d (122.3 overs); Ed Barnard 95 (147); Mohammad Abbas 4/55 (29.3 overs)
97 (34.5 overs); James Vince 52* (84); Chris Rushworth 7/38 (13 overs)

Warwickshire won by an innings and 84 runs
Rose Bowl, Southampton
Umpires: Russell Warren and Alex Wharf

- Hampshire won the toss and elected to bat.
- No play was possible on Day 3 due to rain.
- Points: Warwickshire 22, Hampshire 1.

4–7 May 2023
Scorecard

Lancashire	v	Nottinghamshire
214 (44.2 overs); Josh Bohannon 68 (72); Brett Hutton 5/66 (13 overs)		249 (72.4 overs); Haseeb Hameed 97 (198); Will Williams 3/31 (17.4 overs)
329/8d (87.3 overs); Josh Bohannon 92 (132); Lyndon James 3/45 (16 overs)		138/9 (67 overs); Joe Clarke 42 (88); George Balderson 3/21 (11 overs)

Match drawn
Trent Bridge, Nottingham
Umpires: Rob Bailey and Martin Saggers

- Nottinghamshire won the toss and elected to field.
- Points: Lancashire 3, Nottinghamshire 3.

4–7 May 2023
Scorecard

Northamptonshire	v	Somerset
255 (78.2 overs); Ricardo Vasconcelos 70 (103); Jack Leach 3/15 (7 overs)		412 (94.3 overs); Tom Kohler-Cadmore 130 (102); Jack White 5/103 (22.3 overs)
311/8 (104 overs); Sam Whiteman 130* (269); Jack Leach 3/77 (32 overs)

Match drawn
County Ground, Taunton
Umpires: David Millns and Neil Mallender

- Somerset won the toss and elected to field.
- Points: Somerset 7, Northamptonshire 4.

11–14 May 2023
Scorecard

Kent	v	Hampshire
95 (37.4 overs); Tawanda Muyeye 28 (42); James Fuller 5/21 (8 overs)		373 (104.5 overs); Liam Dawson 84 (153); Joey Evison 3/86 (20.5 overs)
259/4 (113 overs); Jack Leaning 68* (206); Liam Dawson 2/31 (18 overs)

Match drawn
St Lawrence Ground, Canterbury
Umpires: Paul Pollard and Martin Saggers

- Hampshire won the toss and elected to field.
- Points: Hampshire 11, Kent 8.

11–14 May 2023
Scorecard

Somerset	v	Lancashire
361 (120 overs); James Rew 105 (241); Daryl Mitchell 3/32 (13 overs)		326 (101 overs); Daryl Mitchell 105 (177); Craig Overton 4/52 (22 overs)
398/5 (111 overs); James Rew 118* (244); Will Williams 2/45 (11 overs)

Match drawn
Old Trafford Cricket Ground, Manchester
Umpires: Nigel Llong and Tom Lungley

- Lancashire won the toss and elected to field.
- Points: Somerset 10, Lancashire 9.

11–14 May 2023
Scorecard

Northamptonshire	v	Nottinghamshire
158 (65.1 overs); Ricardo Vasconcelos 62 (179); Brett Hutton 5/37 (18.1 overs)		255 (74.3 overs); Joe Clarke 76 (179); James Sales 4/24 (6 overs)
72 (30.1 overs); Saif Zaib 26 (52); Dane Paterson 5/16 (10 overs)

Nottinghamshire won by an innings and 25 runs
County Ground, Northampton
Umpires: Neil Pratt and Richard Illingworth

- Nottinghamshire won the toss and elected to field.
- Points: Nottinghamshire 20, Northamptonshire 3.

11–14 May 2023
Scorecard

Middlesex	v	Surrey
209 (66.5 overs); Sam Robson 76 (132); Daniel Worrall 5/48 (14 overs)		380 (99.4 overs); Jamie Smith 97 (187); Ethan Bamber 3/87 (29 overs)
240 (71.4 overs); Max Holden 43 (80); Jordan Clark 4/25 (9 overs)		73/1 (16.4 overs); Ryan Patel 37* (42); Tim Murtagh 1/11 (5 overs)

Surrey won by 9 wickets
The Oval, London
Umpires: Graham Lloyd and Russell Warren

- Surrey won the toss and elected to field.
- Points: Surrey 22, Middlesex 3.

11–14 May 2023
Scorecard

Essex	v	Warwickshire
126 (41.3 overs); Tom Westley 47 (94); Oliver Hannon-Dalby 4/21 (12.3 overs)		242 (69.5 overs); Will Rhodes 63 (158); Doug Bracewell 4/51 (13 overs)
215 (57.4 overs); Simon Harmer 50* (79); Hasan Ali 4/48 (13.4 overs)		100/6 (27.2 overs); Will Rhodes 29 (31); Doug Bracewell 2/24 (5 overs)

Warwickshire won by 4 wickets
Edgbaston, Birmingham
Umpires: Rob White and David Millns

- Warwickshire won the toss and elected to field.
- Points: Warwickshire 19, Essex 3.

18–21 May 2023
Scorecard

Hampshire	v	Northamptonshire
367 (110.1 overs); James Vince 95 (180); Jack White 4/80 (27 overs)		56 (30.2 overs); Saif Zaib 29 (57); Keith Barker 4/13 (12 overs)
		176 (66.3 overs); Saif Zaib 57* (86); Liam Dawson 6/61 (18 overs)

Hampshire won by an innings and 135 runs
Rose Bowl, Southampton
Umpires: Peter Hartley and James Middlebrook

- Hampshire won the toss and elected to bat.
- Alex Russell (Northamptonshire) made his first-class debut.
- Points: Hampshire 22, Northamptonshire 3.

18–21 May 2023
Scorecard

Somerset	v	Middlesex
404 (111.2 overs); George Bartlett 121 (214); Ryan Higgins 4/74 (21.2 overs)		175 (52 overs); John Simpson 57* (116); Matt Henry 5/45 (16 overs)
		216 (73.2 overs); Mark Stoneman 60 (129); Craig Overton 5/46 (19.2 overs)

Somerset won by an innings and 13 runs
Lord's, London
Umpires: Ian Blackwell and Paul Pollard

- Middlesex won the toss and elected to field.
- Points: Somerset 23, Middlesex 3.

18–21 May 2023
Scorecard

Essex	v	Nottinghamshire
298 (90.2 overs); Alastair Cook 72 (124); Brett Hutton 4/69 (24 overs)		442 (131.2 overs); Matt Montgomery 177 (318); Matt Critchley 3/33 (10.2 overs)
362/8d (119.5 overs); Alastair Cook 99 (228); Calvin Harrison 3/52 (11.5 overs)		97/4 (34 overs); Joe Clarke 42* (74); Sam Cook 2/14 (6 overs)

Match drawn
Trent Bridge, Nottingham
Umpires: Tom Lungley and Steve O'Shaughnessy

- Nottinghamshire won the toss and elected to field.
- Points: Nottinghamshire 11, Essex 7.

18–21 May 2023
Scorecard

Kent	v	Surrey
278 (72.3 overs); Joey Evison 77* (106); Tom Lawes 3/41 (9.3 overs)		362 (92.3 overs); Sean Abbott 78 (88); Arafat Bhuiyan 4/65 (20 overs)
141 (37.4 overs); Tawanda Muyeye 42 (41); Tom Lawes 5/22 (9 overs)		58/0 (11.3 overs); Rory Burns 36* (36)

Surrey won by 10 wickets
The Oval, London
Umpires: Rob Bailey and Nigel Llong

- Surrey won the toss and elected to field.
- Arafat Bhuiyan (Kent) made his first-class debut.
- Points: Surrey 22, Kent 4.

=== June ===
11–14 June 2023
Scorecard

Essex	v	Somerset
462/9d (119 overs); Alastair Cook 128 (244); Josh Davey 3/88 (20 overs)		167 (61.2 overs); Sean Dickson 82* (180); Simon Harmer 5/64 (25 overs)
170/7d (46 overs); Matt Critchley 52 (72); Kasey Aldridge 4/36 (8 overs)		269 (97.1 overs); Tom Abell 83 (207); Jamie Porter 3/31 (14.1 overs)

Essex won by 196 runs
County Ground, Chelmsford
Umpires: Nigel Llong and David Millns

- Essex won the toss and elected to bat.
- Shoaib Bashir (Somerset) made his first-class debut.
- Points: Essex 22, Somerset 2.

11–14 June 2023
Scorecard

Kent	v	Surrey
301 (82.2 overs); Jordan Cox 133 (198); Sean Abbott 4/52 (17 overs)		145 (43.2 overs); Sean Abbott 34 (37); Matt Quinn 3/22 (12 overs)
344 (81 overs); Tawanda Muyeye 79 (120); Jordan Clark 5/79 (17 overs)		501/5 (146.1 overs); Dom Sibley 140* (415); Arshdeep Singh 2/90 (30 overs)

Surrey won by 5 wickets
St Lawrence Ground, Canterbury
Umpires: James Middlebrook and Russell Warren

- Kent won the toss and elected to bat.
- Points: Surrey 19, Kent 5.

11–14 June 2023
Scorecard

Hampshire	v	Lancashire
142 (60.4 overs); Keith Barker 44 (71); Will Williams 3/14 (15 overs)		374 (90.5 overs); Phil Salt 103 (139); Felix Organ 6/67 (13.5 overs)
371 (118.1 overs); James Vince 87 (144); George Balderson 3/84 (22 overs)		142/4 (33 overs); Dane Vilas 64* (85); Mohammad Abbas 2/30 (9 overs)

Lancashire won by 6 wickets
Trafalgar Road Ground, Southport
Umpires: Rob Bailey and Neil Mallender

- Lancashire won the toss and elected to field.
- Points: Lancashire 22, Hampshire 3.

11–14 June 2023
Scorecard

Warwickshire	v	Nottinghamshire
571/9d (135.2 overs); Sam Hain 100 (192); Calvin Harrison 4/138 (30 overs)		155 (56 overs); Tom Moores 42 (66); Hasan Ali 3/30 (12 overs)
		464/6 (153 overs) (f/o); Joe Clarke 229* (365); Chris Rushworth 3/73 (26 overs)

Match drawn
Trent Bridge, Nottingham
Umpires: Peter Hartley and Steve O'Shaughnessy

- Warwickshire won the toss and elected to bat.
- Points: Warwickshire 12, Nottinghamshire 7.

25–28 June 2023
Scorecard

Essex	v	Warwickshire
457 (112.1 overs); Dan Lawrence 152 (233); Jake Lintott 3/68 (15.1 overs)		158 (50.5 overs); Will Rhodes 43 (88); Simon Harmer 5/65 (22.5 overs)
85/1 (15 overs); Feroze Khushi 40 (46); Dom Bess 1/28 (7 overs)		381 (93.5 overs) (f/o); Jake Lintott 78 (67); Simon Harmer 5/165 (45.5 overs)

Essex won by 9 wickets
County Ground, Chelmsford
Umpires: Richard Kettleborough and Tom Lungley

- Essex won the toss and elected to bat.
- Points: Essex 24, Warwickshire 2.

25–28 June 2023
Scorecard

Hampshire	v	Middlesex
419 (137.3 overs); Liam Dawson 141 (247); Josh de Caires 7/144 (47.3 overs)		150 (56.5 overs); Sam Robson 38 (81); Liam Dawson 6/40 (22 overs)
		208 (70.4 overs) (f/o); Ryan Higgins 54 (65); Liam Dawson 6/90 (23.4 overs)

Hampshire won by an innings and 61 runs
Rose Bowl, Southampton
Umpires: Ian Blackwell and Nigel Llong

- Hampshire won the toss and elected to bat.
- Points: Hampshire 21, Middlesex 1.

25–28 June 2023
Scorecard

Northamptonshire	v	Kent
237 (64.2 overs); Rob Keogh 97 (147); Wes Agar 5/63 (15 overs)		621 (143.5 overs); Daniel Bell-Drummond 300* (439); Alex Russell 6/175 (27.5 overs)
369 (114 overs); Jack White 59 (76); Joe Denly 4/169 (49 overs)

Kent won by an innings and 15 runs
County Ground, Northampton
Umpires: Rob Bailey and Graham Lloyd

- Northamptonshire won the toss and elected to bat.
- Points: Kent 24, Northamptonshire 1

25–28 June 2023
Scorecard

Somerset	v	Nottinghamshire
163 (48.1 overs); Tom Kohler-Cadmore 38 (53); Brett Hutton 5/34 (10.1 overs)		186 (59.4 overs); Ben Slater 70 (141); Matt Henry 6/59 (20 overs)
514/8d (138.5 overs); George Bartlett 134 (265); Lyndon James 2/64 (18 overs)		92 (25.1 overs); Tom Moores 24 (27); Josh Davey 4/17 (6.1 overs)

Somerset won by 399 runs
County Ground, Taunton
Umpires: Paul Pollard and Rob White

- Somerset won the toss and elected to bat.
- Points: Somerset 19, Nottinghamshire 3.

25–28 June 2023
Scorecard

Lancashire	v	Surrey
274 (74 overs); Phil Salt 56 (89); Jordan Clark 4/47 (15 overs)		360 (71.3 overs); Sean Abbott 87* (69); Will Williams 3/86 (21 overs)
293 (114 overs); Will Williams 61 (220); Daniel Worrall 3/69 (26 overs)		84 (33.3 overs); Rory Burns 20 (58); Tom Bailey 5/48 (16 overs)

Lancashire won by 123 runs
The Oval, London
Umpires: Mike Burns and Michael Gough

- Surrey won the toss and elected to field.
- Points: Lancashire 20 Surrey 6

=== July ===
10–13 July 2023
Scorecard

Kent	v	Warwickshire
171 (40.5 overs); Grant Stewart 50 (45); Oliver Hannon-Dalby 4/56 (14.5 overs)		549/7d (133 overs); Rob Yates 228* (421); Jack Leaning 2/70 (14 overs)
332 (100.2 overs); Harry Finch 67 (167); Oliver Hannon-Dalby 4/59 (22.2 overs)

Warwickshire won by an innings and 46 runs
St Lawrence Ground, Canterbury
Umpires: Ian Blackwell and Mark Newell

- Kent won the toss and elected to bat.
- Points: Warwickshire 23, Kent 2.

10–13 July 2023
Scorecard

Essex	v	Lancashire
282 (92.2 overs); Tom Westley 135 (239); Tom Bailey 6/59 (22.2 overs)		145 (44.4 overs); Josh Bohannon 44 (107); Sam Cook 4/42 (16.4 overs)
292/8d (53.3 overs); Dan Lawrence 135 (125); Tom Bailey 3/71 (15 overs)		383 (94.2 overs); Rob Jones 111 (170); Doug Bracewell 3/50 (15.2 overs)

Essex won by 46 runs
Stanley Park, Blackpool
Umpires: Peter Hartley and Steve O'Shaughnessy

- Essex won the toss and elected to bat.
- Points: Essex 20, Lancashire 3.

10–13 July 2023
Scorecard

Northamptonshire	v	Middlesex
219 (88.4 overs); Saif Zaib 49 (83); Ethan Bamber 2/33 (18.4 overs)		277 (73.2 overs); Ryan Higgins 64* (105); Rob Keogh 3/52 (15.2 overs)
380 (118.2 overs); Sam Whiteman 114 (248); Tom Helm 3/75 (26 overs)		322/6 (92 overs); Sam Robson 126* (252); Ben Sanderson 2/62 (20 overs)

Match drawn
Merchant Taylors' School Ground, Northwood
Umpires: Tom Lungley and Paul Pollard

- Northamptonshire won the toss and elected to bat.
- Justin Broad (Northamptonshire) made his first-class debut.
- Points: Middlesex 12, Northamptonshire 8.

10–13 July 2023
Scorecard

Somerset	v	Hampshire
500 (120.1 overs); James Rew 221 (310); Kyle Abbott 4/56 (20 overs)		330 (102.2 overs); Felix Organ 97 (206); Shoaib Bashir 3/88 (31 overs)
		215/7 (97 overs); Liam Dawson 68* (141); Shoaib Bashir 3/67 (37 overs)

Match drawn
County Ground, Taunton
Umpires: James Middlebrook and Russell Warren

- Somerset won the toss and elected to bat.
- Alfie Ogborne (Somerset) made his first-class debut.
- Points: Somerset 12, Hampshire 10.

10–13 July 2023
Scorecard

Surrey	v	Nottinghamshire
355 (99.2 overs); Jordan Clark 107 (142); Lyndon James 6/74 (24.4 overs)		399 (118.4 overs); Will Young 145 (277); Sean Abbott 3/85 (30 overs)
340 (102.1 overs); Dom Sibley 83 (157); Brett Hutton 5/91 (29.1 overs)		118/1 (33.1 overs); Haseeb Hameed 44* (107); Will Jacks 1/30 (9 overs)

Match drawn
The Oval, London
Umpires: Rob Bailey and Nigel Llong

- Nottinghamshire won the toss and elected to field.
- Points: Nottinghamshire 11, Surrey 10.

19–22 July 2023
Scorecard

Kent	v	Essex
207 (59 overs); Ben Compton 47 (81); Sam Cook 3/19 (11 overs)		458/8d (126 overs); Matt Critchley 117 (168); Arshdeep Singh 3/58 (23 overs)
280 (111.1 overs); Harry Finch 114 (228); Sam Cook 4/46 (21 overs)		30/3 (3.5 overs); Adam Rossington 14 (8); Hamidullah Qadri 2/19 (2 overs)

Essex won by 7 wickets
County Ground, Chelmsford
Umpires: Rob Bailey and Graham Lloyd

- Kent won the toss and elected to bat.
- Points: Essex 21, Kent 2.

19–22 July 2023
Scorecard

Surrey	v	Middlesex
433 (127.4 overs); Jamie Smith 138 (194); Tom Helm 6/110 (27.4 overs)		238 (85.1 overs); John Simpson 60 (133); Sean Abbott 3/37 (19.1 overs)
78/2 (11.1 overs); Will Jacks 45* (35); Tom Helm 2/37 (5 overs)		272 (71.3 overs) (f/o); Mark Stoneman 72 (78); Sean Abbott 4/60 (17.3 overs)

Surrey won by 8 wickets
Lord's, London
Umpires: Steve O'Shaughnessy and Rob White

- Middlesex won the toss and elected to field.
- Points: Surrey 22, Middlesex 2.

19–22 July 2023
Scorecard

Somerset	v	Northamptonshire
351 (94 overs); Sean Dickson 70 (108); Jack White 5/77 (24 overs)		180 (48.5 overs); Ricardo Vasconcelos 78 (104); Craig Overton 4/50 (13.5 overs)
56/1 (10.4 overs); Tom Lammonby 30* (42); Ben Sanderson 1/28 (5.4 overs)		224 (50.1 overs) (f/o); Luke Procter 87* (128); Matt Henry 5/73 (17 overs)

Somerset won by 9 wickets
County Ground, Northampton
Umpires: Ian Blackwell and Nigel Llong

- Northamptonshire won the toss and elected to field.
- Points: Somerset 22, Northamptonshire 3.

19–22 July 2023
Scorecard

Hampshire	v	Nottinghamshire
166 (48.2 overs); Nick Gubbins 49 (85); Lyndon James 3/38 (10 overs)		100 (37.5 overs); Ben Slater 31 (53); Ian Holland 4/19 (8 overs)
344/5d (85 overs); Ian Holland 138* (251); Dane Paterson 3/65 (20 overs)		294 (85.3 overs); Tom Moores 81 (109); James Fuller 4/59 (15 overs)

Hampshire won by 116 runs
Trent Bridge, Nottingham
Umpires: Paul Pollard and Russell Warren

- Nottinghamshire won the toss and elected to field.
- Points: Hampshire 19, Nottinghamshire 3.

19–22 July 2023
Scorecard

Lancashire	v	Warwickshire
327 (109 overs); George Balderson 116* (235); Mir Hamza 3/96 (22.4 overs)		212 (83.2 overs); Will Rhodes 82 (168); Luke Wells 2/21 (8.2 overs)
182/6 (65 overs); Keaton Jennings 64* (174); Oliver Hannon-Dalby 2/30 (16 overs)

Match drawn
Edgbaston, Birmingham
Umpires: Ben Debenham and Tom Lungley

- Warwickshire won the toss and elected to field.
- Points: Lancashire 10, Warwickshire 8.

25–28 July 2023
Scorecard

Hampshire	v	Essex
120 (38.2 overs); Nick Gubbins 25 (44); Jamie Porter 5/37 (14 overs)		169 (71.5 overs); Adam Rossington 39 (89); John Turner 3/23 (13 overs)
131 (49.1 overs); Nick Gubbins 45 (123); Jamie Porter 5/46 (18 overs)		86/4 (24.1 overs); Nick Browne 28 (41); Kyle Abbott 3/23 (9 overs)

Essex won by 6 wickets
Rose Bowl, Southampton
Umpires: Mike Burns and Rob White

- Essex won the toss and elected to field.
- Points: Essex 19, Hampshire 3.

25–28 July 2023
Scorecard

Northamptonshire	v	Lancashire
342 (116.1 overs); Emilio Gay 144 (250); George Balderson 3/44 (16 overs)		544/7d (106 overs); Josh Bohannon 128 (165); Jack White 3/85 (24 overs)
213/5 (100 overs); Emilio Gay 61 (155); Tom Hartley 2/70 (37 overs)

Match drawn
Old Trafford Cricket Ground, Manchester
Umpires: Graham Lloyd and James Middlebrook

- Northamptonshire won the toss and elected to bat.
- Points: Northamptonshire 9, Lancashire 12.

25–28 July 2023
Scorecard

Nottinghamshire	v	Kent
350 (107 overs); Ben Slater 100 (155); Jas Singh 4/87 (18 overs)		316 (104 overs); Harry Finch 73 (156); Calvin Harrison 4/28 (7 overs)
372/6d (63 overs); Will Young 87 (79); Jas Singh 2/72 (12 overs)		85 (21.3 overs); Jack Leaning 21 (21); Dane Paterson 5/41 (10 overs)

Nottinghamshire won by 321 runs
Trent Bridge, Nottingham
Umpires: Neil Mallender and Peter Hartley

- Kent won the toss and elected to field.
- Points: Nottinghamshire 22, Kent 5.

25–28 July 2023
Scorecard

Somerset	v	Surrey
170 (56.3 overs); Tom Kohler-Cadmore 59 (101); Tom Lawes 4/41 (13 overs)		368 (90.1 overs); Will Jacks 99 (138); Matt Henry 6/80 (25.1 overs)
226 (62.5 overs); Craig Overton 70* (63); Jordan Clark 4/36 (15 overs)		29/0 (8.3 overs); Rory Burns 16* (26)

Surrey won by 10 wickets
County Ground, Taunton
Umpires: Mark Newell and Russell Warren

- Somerset won the toss and elected to bat.
- Points: Surrey 22, Somerset 3.

25–28 July 2023
Scorecard

Warwickshire	v	Middlesex
60 (22.5 overs); Ed Barnard 14 (34); Ethan Bamber 5/20 (9 overs)		199 (52.1 overs); Ryan Higgins 53 (72); Oliver Hannon-Dalby 3/49 (14.1 overs)
232 (88.4 overs); Sam Hain 69 (186); Ethan Bamber 4/71 (22 overs)		97/2 (25.1 overs); Mark Stoneman 52* (88); Henry Brookes 2/33 (6 overs)

Middlesex won by 8 wickets
Edgbaston, Birmingham
Umpires: Hassan Adnan and Rob Bailey

- Middlesex won the toss and elected to field.
- Points: Middlesex 19, Warwickshire 3.

=== September ===
3–6 September 2023
Scorecard

Hampshire	v	Somerset
308 (109.2 overs); Liam Dawson 115 (220); Jack Brooks 5/56 (23.2 overs)		137 (54.1 overs); Andrew Umeed 43 (93); Keith Barker 5/32 (12.1 overs)
330/3d (87 overs); Nick Gubbins 139* (192); Neil Wagner 2/56 (13 overs)		316 (94.3 overs); Tom Kohler-Cadmore 84 (124); Liam Dawson 4/85 (30.3 overs)

Hampshire won by 185 runs
Rose Bowl, Southampton
Umpires: Ben Debenham and Rob Bailey

- Hampshire won the toss and elected to bat.
- Points: Hampshire 21, Somerset 3.

3–6 September 2023
Scorecard

Northamptonshire	v	Lancashire
232 (75.4 overs); Sam Whiteman 79 (127); Tom Hartley 2/47 (13.4 overs)		524 (142.3 overs); Josh Bohannon 175 (294); Jack White 4/99 (34 overs)
266 (82.2 overs); Sam Whiteman 54 (112); Luke Wells 5/25 (7.2 overs)

Lancashire won by an innings and 26 runs
County Ground, Northampton
Umpires: Hassan Adnan and Mark Newell

- Lancashire won the toss and elected to field.
- Points: Northamptonshire 2, Lancashire 22.

3–6 September 2023
Scorecard

Surrey	v	Warwickshire
396 (109.4 overs); Ben Foakes 125 (210); Ed Barnard 5/66 (20 overs)		161 (44.3 overs); Michael Burgess 54 (92); Kemar Roach 4/64 (13 overs)
		138 (37 overs) (f/o); Dan Mousley 61 (77); Daniel Worrall 5/25 (9 overs)

Surrey won by an innings and 97 runs
The Oval, London
Umpires: Graham Lloyd and Steve O'Shaughnessy

- Warwickshire won the toss and elected to field.
- Points: Surrey 22, Warwickshire 3.

4–7 September 2023
Scorecard

Essex	v	Middlesex
304 (98.2 overs); Nick Browne 59 (108); Josh de Caires 8/106 (39.2 overs)		179 (53.5 overs); Ryan Higgins 44 (55); Jamie Porter 6/34 (12.5 overs)
319/7d (81 overs); Alastair Cook 84 (178); Sam Robson 2/36 (5 overs)		147 (58.2 overs); John Simpson 32 (72); Simon Harmer 5/43 (24.2 overs)

Essex won by 297 runs
County Ground, Chelmsford
Umpires: Ian Blackwell and Russell Warren

- Essex won the toss and elected to bat.
- Points: Essex 21, Middlesex 3.

10–13 September 2023
Scorecard

Kent	v	Nottinghamshire
446 (115.4 overs); Zak Crawley 158 (153); Lyndon James 2/30 (11 overs)		265 (98.2 overs); Steven Mullaney 86 (141); Aron Nijjar 4/67 (32 overs)
86/6 (31.3 overs); Tawanda Muyeye 28 (27); Asitha Fernando 3/40 (10 overs)		348 (123 overs) (f/o); Joe Clarke 141* (277); Michael Hogan 5/63 (22 overs)

Match drawn
St Lawrence Ground, Canterbury
Umpires: Mike Burns and Paul Pollard

- Kent won the toss and elected to bat.
- Points: Kent 12, Nottinghamshire 8.

10–13 September 2023
Scorecard

Middlesex	v	Lancashire
194 (79.5 overs); Sam Robson 86 (235); Tom Bailey 3/38 (19 overs)		413 (102.2 overs); Dane Vilas 124 (180); Jayant Yadav 5/131 (33 overs)
160/3 (67 overs); Jack Davies 65* (148); Tom Hartley 2/43 (23 overs)

Match drawn
Old Trafford Cricket Ground, Manchester
Umpires: Neil Mallender and David Millns

- Middlesex won the toss and elected to bat.
- Points: Lancashire 12, Middlesex 8.

10–13 September 2023
Scorecard

Northamptonshire	v	Warwickshire
250 (94.4 overs); Karun Nair 78 (177); Oliver Hannon-Dalby 7/46 (26.4 overs)		147/4d (66 overs); Will Rhodes 44 (92); Jack White 3/37 (15 overs)
72/0d (22.3 overs); Emilio Gay 31* (65)		176/8 (52.4 overs); Michael Burgess 78* (128); Ben Sanderson 5/42 (17 overs)

Warwickshire won by 2 wickets
Edgbaston, Birmingham
Umpires: Rob Bailey and Neil Pratt

- Warwickshire won the toss and elected to field.
- Points: Warwickshire 19, Northamptonshire 2.

19–22 September 2023
Scorecard

Essex	v	Hampshire
447/9d (119.4 overs); Adam Rossington 104 (145); Liam Dawson 3/165 (35 overs)		334 (90.3 overs); Tom Prest 108 (144); Simon Harmer 6/149 (38.3 overs)
153/8d (28 overs); Dan Lawrence 53 (49); Kyle Abbott 4/63 (13 overs)		267/7 (58.1 overs); Liam Dawson 119 (150); Matt Critchley 3/48 (9 overs)

Hampshire won by 3 wickets
County Ground, Chelmsford
Umpires: Nigel Llong and Steve O'Shaughnessy

- Essex won the toss and elected to bat.
- Points: Hampshire 20, Essex 6.

19–22 September 2023
Scorecard

Lancashire	v	Nottinghamshire
272/7 (84.1 overs); Matthew Hurst 54* (115); Steven Mullaney 2/32 (13 overs)

Match drawn
Old Trafford Cricket Ground, Manchester
Umpires: Hassan Adnan and Ian Blackwell

- Nottinghamshire won the toss and elected to field.
- No play possible on Day 1 and Day 2 due to rain
- Matthew Hurst (Lancashire) made his first-class debut.
- Points: Lancashire 6, Nottinghamshire 7.

19–22 September 2023
Scorecard

Middlesex	v	Warwickshire
121 (39.5 overs); Josh de Caires 40 (58); Oliver Hannon-Dalby 5/29 (10.5 overs)		315 (89.4 overs); Will Rhodes 102 (189); Tim Murtagh 6/83 (25 overs)
251 (100.2 overs); Sam Robson 107* (287); Oliver Hannon-Dalby 3/52 (24 overs)		58/2 (8.3 overs); Ed Barnard 21* (17); Tim Murtagh 2/19 (3 overs)

Warwickshire won by 8 wickets
Lord's, London
Umpires: Graham Lloyd and Russell Warren

- Warwickshire won the toss and elected to field.
- Points: Warwickshire 21, Middlesex 3.

19–22 September 2023
Scorecard

Somerset	v	Kent
404/4d (86 overs); Lewis Goldsworthy 122 (203); Jack Leaning 1/34 (6 overs)		235 (55 overs); Joe Denly 73 (119); Tom Abell 4/54 (11 overs)
		44/2 (15 overs) (f/o); Tawanda Muyeye 24 (37); Neil Wagner 1/1 (3 overs)

Match drawn
County Ground, Taunton
Umpires: Martin Saggers and Tom Lungley

- Kent won the toss and elected to field.
- No play possible on Day 2 due to rain
- Points: Somerset 12, Kent 6.

19–22 September 2023
Scorecard

Northamptonshire	v	Surrey
357 (106.5 overs); Karun Nair 150 (246); Tom Lawes 5/105 (23.5 overs)		185 (63.4 overs); Jamie Overton 51 (60); Jack White 4/45 (19 overs)
		142/0 (64 overs) (f/o); Rory Burns 71* (196)

Match drawn
The Oval, London
Umpires: Paul Pollard and Rob White

- Surrey wond the toss and elected to field.
- Points: Northamptonshire 11, Surrey 8.

26–29 September 2023
Scorecard

Hampshire	v	Surrey
219 (65.5 overs); Ben Brown 78 (107); Tom Lawes 5/27 (10.5 overs)		207 (85.3 overs); Sai Sudharsan 73 (129); Liam Dawson 5/44 (29.3 overs)
172 (62.3 overs); James Vince 56 (103); Will Jacks 5/87 (25 overs)		132 (35.4 overs); Sai Sudharsan 40 (71); Liam Dawson 4/53 (17.4 overs)

Hampshire won by 52 runs
Rose Bowl, Southampton
Umpires: Martin Saggers and Peter Hartley

- Surrey won the toss and elected to field.
- Points: Hampshire 19, Surrey 3.

26–29 September 2023
Scorecard

Kent	v	Lancashire
494 (135.1 overs); Joe Denly 136 (200); George Balderson 4/69 (21 overs)		327 (96 overs); Josh Bohannon 113 (167); Aron Nijjar 3/70 (26 overs)
		390/8d (122 overs); Luke Wells 117 (195); Jack Leaning 3/64 (20 overs)

Match drawn
St Lawrence Ground, Canterbury
Umpires: James Middlebrook and Rob White

- Lancashire won the toss and elected to bat.
- Points: Kent 12, Lancashire 9.

26–29 September 2023
Scorecard

Northamptonshire	v	Essex
369 (84.2 overs); Rob Keogh 172 (167); Jamie Porter 4/105 (22.2 overs)		211 (74.2 overs); Tom Westley 49 (161); Ben Sanderson 3/17 (19 overs)
		119 (27 overs) (f/o); Paul Walter 73 (53); Jack White 5/57 (11 overs)

Northamptonshire won by an innings and 39 runs
County Ground, Northampton
Umpires: Mark Newell and Russell Warren

- Essex won the toss and elected to field.
- Points: Northamptonshire 22, Essex 3.

26–29 September 2023
Scorecard

Nottinghamshire	v	Middlesex
384 (107.4 overs); Ben Slater 140 (284); Josh de Caires 3/56 (14.4 overs)		366 (91 overs); Ryan Higgins 137 (182); Brett Hutton 5/94 (26 overs)
210/8 (55.2 overs); Ben Slater 49 (89); Sam Robson 4/46 (13.2 overs)		224/6d (39 overs); Sam Robson 105 (109); Brett Hutton 2/38 (7 overs)

Nottinghamshire won by 2 wickets
Trent Bridge, Nottingham
Umpires: Ben Debenham and Neil Mallender

- Middlesex won the toss and elected to bat.
- Points: Nottinghamshire 22, Middlesex 6.

26–29 September 2023
Scorecard

Warwickshire	v	Somerset
273 (84.1 overs); Ed Barnard 73 (144); Josh Davey 3/62 (17 overs)		215 (62.1 overs); Neil Wagner 72 (78); Chris Rushworth 5/47 (15.1 overs)
		90/2 (31 overs); Sean Dickson 36* (84); Ed Barnard 2/27 (7 overs)

Match drawn
Edgbaston, Birmingham
Umpires: Ian Blackwell and Paul Pollard

- Somerset won the toss and elected to bat.
- No play possible on Day 4 due to rain
- Points: Warwickshire 9, Somerset 8.

== Division Two ==
=== April ===
6–9 April 2023
Scorecard

Derbyshire	v	Worcestershire
321 (73.1 overs); Wayne Madsen 87 (134); Matthew Waite 4/50 (17.1 overs)		473 (129 overs); Matthew Waite 109* (149); Zak Chappell 5/69 (22 overs)
343 (95.5 overs); Leus du Plooy 95* (138); Joe Leach 3/86 (30 overs)		193/2 (42.1 overs); Jake Libby 104* (140); Ben Aitchison 1/33 (8 overs)

Worcestershire won by 8 wickets
County Ground, Derby
Umpires: Neil Bainton and Paul Baldwin

- Worcestershire won the toss and elected to field.
- Play was restricted to 67 overs on Day 1 due to rain.
- Points: Worcestershire 22, Derbyshire 5.

6–9 April 2023
Scorecard

Gloucestershire	v	Glamorgan
165 (60.5 overs); Marcus Harris 59 (129); Timm van der Gugten 5/26 (17 overs)		404 (108.2 overs); Billy Root 117* (179); Tom Price 4/56 (23.2 overs)
569/7d (138 overs); Marcus Harris 148 (192); Timm van der Gugten 2/89 (28 overs)		110/3 (37 overs); Billy Root 39* (87); Tom Price 2/21 (5 overs)

Match drawn
Sophia Gardens, Cardiff
Umpires: Mark Newell and Steve O'Shaughnessy

- Glamorgan won the toss and elected to field.
- Play was restricted to 62 overs on Day 1 due to rain.
- Points: Gloucestershire 8, Glamorgan 12.

6–9 April 2023
Scorecard

Durham	v	Sussex
376 (80.2 overs); Michael Jones 87 (156); Nathan McAndrew 5/85 (24.2 overs)		335 (93.4 overs); Cheteshwar Pujara 115 (163); Ben Raine 3/72 (23.4 overs)
189 (54 overs); Ollie Robinson 58 (92); Fynn Hudson-Prentice 4/27 (12 overs)		232/8 (67 overs); Tom Haines 64 (69); Matthew Kuhnemann 4/70 (24 overs)

Sussex won by 2 wickets
County Ground, Hove
Umpires: James Middlebrook and Billy Taylor

- Sussex won the toss and elected to field.
- Play was restricted to 70 overs on Day 1 due to rain.
- Ben McKinney (Durham) made his first-class debut.
- Points: Sussex 21, Durham 6.

6–9 April 2023
Scorecard

Yorkshire	v	Leicestershire
517 (102 overs); Dawid Malan 132 (154); Rehan Ahmed 3/89 (15 overs)		415 (114.1 overs); Peter Handscomb 112 (201); Matt Milnes 3/72 (24 overs)
286/8d (54 overs); Shai Hope 83 (107); Josh Hull 3/68 (8 overs)		392/7 (85.5 overs); Rishi Patel 125 (205); Dom Bess 5/158 (32 overs)

Leicestershire won by 3 wickets
Headingley Cricket Ground, Leeds
Umpires: Ben Debenham and Paul Pollard

- Leicestershire won the toss and elected to field.
- Play was restricted to 60 overs on Day 1 due to rain.
- Josh Hull (Leicestershire) made his first-class debut.
- Rishi Patel scored his first century in first-class cricket.
- Points: Leicestershire 22, Yorkshire 7.

13–16 April 2023
Scorecard

Durham	v	Worcestershire
425/9d (112.3 overs); David Bedingham 118 (148); Ben Gibbon 4/92 (26 overs)		366/5d (110 overs); Jack Haynes 134* (255); Matthew Potts 3/110 (27 overs)
254/4d (42 overs); Scott Borthwick 108 * (119); Ben Gibbon 2/55 (11 overs)		192 (64.4 overs); Brett D'Oliveira 42 (75); Matthew Kuhnemann 5/53 (23.4 overs)

Durham won by 121 runs
Riverside Ground, Chester-le-Street
Umpires: Hassan Adnan and Rob White

- Worcestershire won the toss and elected to field.
- Play was restricted to 43 overs on Day 2 due to rain.
- Points: Durham 21, Worcestershire 5.

13–16 April 2023
Scorecard

Gloucestershire	v	Yorkshire

Match abandoned
County Ground, Bristol
Umpires: Paul Pollard and Billy Taylor

- No toss.
- No play was possible on first 3 days due to rain after which it was called off.
- Points: Gloucestershire 5, Yorkshire 5.

13–16 April 2023
Scorecard

Leicestershire	v	Derbyshire
451/9d (108.3 overs); Lewis Hill 162* (269); Zak Chappell 4/115 (30 overs)		254/7 (46 overs); Brooke Guest 92 (99); Chris Wright 4/38 (13 overs)

Match drawn
Grace Road, Leicester
Umpires: Tom Lungley and Neil Pratt

- Derbyshire won the toss and elected to field.
- No play was possible on Day 2 and 3 due to rain.
- Points: Leicestershire 12, Derbyshire 9.

20–23 April 2023
Scorecard

Durham	v	Glamorgan
471/9d (112.3 overs); Brydon Carse 91 (110); Marnus Labuschagne 4/81 (17.3 overs)		305 (79.4 overs); Kiran Carlson 119 (166); Ben Raine 4/65 (23 overs)
		104/6 (23 overs) (f/o); David Lloyd 31 (46); Paul Coughlin 3/27 (8 overs)

Match drawn
Sophia Gardens, Cardiff
Umpires: Tom Lungley and Neil Mallender

- Glamorgan won the toss and elected to field.
- No play was possible on Day 2 due to rain.
- Points: Durham 10, Glamorgan 7.

20–23 April 2023
Scorecard

Sussex	v	Yorkshire
361 (103.3 overs); Tom Alsop 95 (152); Ben Coad 5/54 (21.3 overs)		298 (74 overs); Finlay Bean 49 (132); Jack Carson 5/79 (21 overs)
137 (43.1 overs); Fynn Hudson-Prentice 30 (39); Dom Bess 3/36 (16.1 overs)		138/3 (40 overs); Adam Lyth 69* (118); Fynn Hudson-Prentice 2/19 (7 overs)

Match drawn
County Ground, Hove
Umpires: Neil Pratt and Rob White

- Sussex won the toss and elected to bat.
- No play was possible on Day 4 due to rain.
- Sussex was deducted 4 points for slow over rate.
- Points: Sussex 7, Yorkshire 9.

20–23 April 2023
Scorecard

Gloucestershire	v	Worcestershire
231 (54.4 overs); Tom Price 109 (98); Joe Leach 4/49 (16 overs)		157 (55.1 overs); Matthew Waite 44 (66); Ajeet Singh Dale 6/41 (17.1 overs)
226/4d (62 overs); Chris Dent 83 (157); Josh Tongue 3/37 (14 overs)		51/4 (14 overs); Jake Libby 22 (40); Tom Price 2/19 (7 overs)

Match drawn
New Road, Worcester
Umpires: Ian Blackwell and Chris Watts

- Gloucestershire won the toss and elected to bat.
- No play was possible on Day 2 due to rain.
- Points: Gloucestershire 8, Worcestershire 8.

27–30 April 2023
Scorecard

Durham	v	Derbyshire
452/9d (99.4 overs); Ollie Robinson 114 (107); Ben Aitchison 3/131 (27.4 overs)		165 (34.3 overs); Luis Reece 56* (62); Ben Raine 3/19 (7 overs)
		280 (73.4 overs) (f/o); Matt Lamb 99 (140); Matthew Potts 5/65 (16.4 overs)

Durham won by an innings and 7 runs
Riverside Ground, Chester-le-Street
Umpires: Ben Debenham and Graham Lloyd

- Durham won the toss and elected to bat.
- Brydon Carse (Durham) scored his maiden first class century.
- Points: Durham 24, Derbyshire 3.

27–30 April 2023
Scorecard

Sussex	v	Gloucestershire
455/5d (109.2 overs); Cheteshwar Pujara 151 (238); Marchant de Lange 2/78 (24 overs)		248 (91.2 overs); Miles Hammond 87* (171); Nathan McAndrew 5/63 (22 overs)
		121/4 (28 overs) (f/o); Graeme van Buuren 55* (70); Sean Hunt 3/36 (7 overs)

Match drawn
County Ground, Bristol
Umpires: Mark Newell and Billy Taylor

- Gloucestershire won the toss and elected to field.
- Play was restricted to 16 overs on Day 1 due to rain.
- Points: Sussex 13, Gloucestershire 6.

27–30 April 2023
Scorecard

Leicestershire	v	Glamorgan
407 (107.4 overs); Peter Handscomb 95 (168); Timm van der Gugten 6/88 (29 overs)		465 (158.1 overs); Chris Cooke 132 (257); Chris Wright 5/89 (36.1 overs)
252/3d (64 overs); Rishi Patel 134* (213); David Lloyd 2/32 (9 overs)

Match drawn
Grace Road, Leicester
Umpires: Neil Bainton and Chris Watts

- Glamorgan won the toss and elected to field.
- Play was restricted to 66.4 overs on Day 1 due to rain.
- Points: Leicestershire 11, Glamorgan 10.

=== May ===
4–7 May 2023
Scorecard

Leicestershire	v	Derbyshire
122 (39.5 overs); Sol Budinger 31 (43); Henry Brookes 6/20 (12 overs)		350/7d (97.2 overs); Leus du Plooy 94 (150); Wiaan Mulder 5/67 (26.2 overs)
281 (92.5 overs); Lewis Hill 63 (108); Mark Watt 3/35 (13.5 overs)		0/0 (1 over)

Match drawn
County Ground, Derby
Umpires: Billy Taylor and Paul Pollard

- Derbyshire won the toss and elected to field.
- Points: Derbyshire 6, Leicestershire 2.

4–7 May 2023
Scorecard

Worcestershire	v	Sussex
264 (55 overs); Matthew Waite 59 (54); Ollie Robinson 7/59 (17 overs)		373 (89.2 overs); Cheteshwar Pujara 136* (189); Joe Leach 3/83 (23.2 overs)
251/8 (96.4 overs); Azhar Ali 103* (279); Ollie Robinson 7/58 (28.4 overs)

Match drawn
New Road, Worcester
Umpires: Peter Hartley and Chris Watts

- Sussex won the toss and elected to field.
- No play was possible on Day 3 due to rain.
- Points: Sussex 6, Worcestershire 4.

4–7 May 2023
Scorecard

Glamorgan	v	Yorkshire
245 (71.5 overs); Marnus Labuschagne 65 (166); Mickey Edwards 3/54 (15 overs)		106 (31 overs); Dawid Malan 25 (38); Michael Neser 7/32 (11 overs)
352/4d (82 overs); Marnus Labuschagne 170* (207); Jordan Thompson 2/68 (20 overs)		412/9 (96 overs); Adam Lyth 174 (220); Timm van der Gugten 4/72 (24 overs)

Match drawn
Headingley Cricket Ground, Leeds
Umpires: Hassan Adnan and Ian Blackwell

- Yorkshire won the toss and elected to field.
- Points: Glamorgan 3, Yorkshire 3.

11–14 May 2023
Scorecard

Derbyshire	v	Gloucestershire
251/9d (83.4 overs); Harry Came 108 (192); Matthew Taylor 3/47 (21 overs)		383 (101.3 overs); Ben Charlesworth 87 (211); Luis Reece 3/47 (13 overs)
166/5 (42 overs); Leus du Plooy 61* (77); Tom Price 2/36 (11 overs)

Match drawn
County Ground, Derby
Umpires: Neil Bainton and Jack Shantry

- Gloucestershire won the toss and elected to field.
- No play was possible on Day 1 due to rain.
- Mitch Wagstaff (Derbyshire) made his first-class debut.
- Points: Gloucestershire 11, Derbyshire 9.

11–14 May 2023
Scorecard

Yorkshire	v	Durham
254 (80.3 overs); Shan Masood 44 (92); Matthew Potts 4/49 (22 overs)		227 (64.5 overs); Ollie Robinson 44 (63); George Hill 4/43 (15 overs)
218 (67 overs); George Hill 51 (52); Ben Raine 4/36 (19 overs)		246/9 (81 overs); Michael Jones 56 (138); Matthew Fisher 4/64 (22 overs)

Durham won by 1 wicket
Riverside Ground, Chester-le-Street
Umpires: Paul Baldwin and Ben Debenham

- Yorkshire won the toss and elected to bat.
- Points: Durham 19, Yorkshire 4.

11–14 May 2023
Scorecard

Worcestershire	v	Glamorgan
109 (40.3 overs); Gareth Roderick 39 (80); James Harris 4/18 (7.3 overs)		258 (79.4 overs); Michael Neser 86 (120); Adam Finch 5/74 (20 overs)
227 (73 overs); Matthew Waite 45 (79); Timm van der Gugten 5/48 (21 overs)		82/0 (20 overs); Eddie Byrom 51* (55)

Glamorgan won by 10 wickets
Sophia Gardens, Cardiff
Umpires: Rob Bailey and Surendiran Shanmugam

- Glamorgan won the toss and elected to field.
- Points: Glamorgan 20, Worcestershire 3.

11–14 May 2023
Scorecard

Sussex	v	Leicestershire
430 (118.3 overs); Tom Alsop 182* (316); Wiaan Mulder 5/63 (24.3 overs)		270 (66 overs); Rehan Ahmed 59* (74); Fynn Hudson-Prentice 4/48 (16 overs)
		295/6 (82 overs) (f/o); Wiaan Mulder 102* (167); Henry Crocombe 2/72 (18 overs)

Match drawn
Grace Road, Leicester
Umpires: Hassan Adnan and James Middlebrook

- Leicestershire won the toss and elected to field.
- No play was possible on Day 1 due to rain.
- Points: Sussex 12, Leicestershire 8.

18–21 May 2023
Scorecard

Durham	v	Gloucestershire
445 (104.2 overs); Graham Clark 100 (155); Zafar Gohar 4/130 (32 overs)		292 (79.2 overs); Ben Charlesworth 71 (179); Ajaz Patel 5/113 (29 overs)
272/4d (48 overs); Michael Jones 121* (148); Zafar Gohar 2/121 (19 overs)		300 (76.4 overs); Marcus Harris 122* (195); Ajaz Patel 5/96 (27.4 overs)

Durham won by 125 runs
County Ground, Bristol
Umpires: Mark Newell and Surendiran Shanmugam

- Durham won the toss and elected to bat.
- Marcus Harris (Gloucestershire) carried his bat.
- Points: Durham 23, Gloucestershire 4.

18–21 May 2023
Scorecard

Glamorgan	v	Sussex
123 (37.4 overs); James Harris 28* (33); Ollie Robinson 4/29 (12 overs)		481 (119.5 overs); James Coles 138 (223); Michael Neser 3/81 (21.5 overs)
737 (207.5 overs); Kiran Carlson 192 (278); Steve Smith 2/55 (10.5 overs)		1/0 (1 over); Ali Orr 1* (4)

Match drawn
County Ground, Hove
Umpires: Martin Saggers and Rob White

- Sussex won the toss and elected to field.
- Zain-ul-Hassan (Glamorgan) made his first-class debut.
- Points: Sussex 12, Glamorgan 7.

18–21 May 2023
Scorecard

Leicestershire	v	Worcestershire
173 (55.5 overs); Colin Ackermann 52 (105); Matthew Waite 3/17 (9 overs)		83 (21.1 overs); Ed Pollock 30 (24); Chris Wright 5/32 (10 overs)
180 (59.1 overs); Lewis Hill 49 (121); Joe Leach 5/41 (20.1 overs)		274/7 (103.3 overs); Adam Hose 84 (117); Wiaan Mulder 4/69 (29 overs)

Worcestershire won by 3 wickets
New Road, Worcester
Umpires: Neil Pratt and Jack Shantry

- Worcestershire won the toss and elected to field.
- Points: Worcestershire 19, Leicestershire 3.

=== June ===
11–14 June 2023
Scorecard

Derbyshire	v	Yorkshire
111 (31.4 overs); Leus du Plooy 28 (40); Matthew Fisher 5/30 (10.4 overs)		353 (85.3 overs); Dawid Malan 106 (143); Mark Watt 5/83 (25.3 overs)
453 (118.5 overs); Leus du Plooy 170 (294); Matthew Fisher 3/70 (22.5 overs)		215/7 (50.1 overs); Shan Masood 95* (112); Mark Watt 4/74 (18 overs)

Yorkshire won by 3 wickets
Queen's Park, Chesterfield
Umpires: Tom Lungley and Chris Watts

- Yorkshire won the toss and elected to field.
- Points: Yorkshire 22, Derbyshire 3.

11–14 June 2023
Scorecard

Glamorgan	v	Durham
390 (92.5 overs); Kiran Carlson 162 (213); Craig Miles 4/73 (22 overs)		630 (148.4 overs); David Bedingham 151 (246); Andy Gorvin 3/88 (22.4 overs)
426/7d (118 overs); Chris Cooke 134* (224); Bas de Leede 4/76 (18 overs)

Match drawn
Riverside Ground, Chester-le-Street
Umpires: Paul Pollard and Neil Pratt

- Glamorgan won the toss and elected to bat.
- Points: Durham 13, Glamorgan 10.

11–14 June 2023
Scorecard

Gloucestershire	v	Leicestershire
368 (112.4 overs); Ollie Price 85 (172); Chris Wright 3/40 (23 overs)		350 (102 overs); Lewis Hill 103 (219); Zaman Akhter 4/33 (17 overs)
202 (49.2 overs); Miles Hammond 48 (53); Chris Wright 4/49 (13 overs)		221/5 (41.2 overs); Colin Ackermann 78* (86); Danny Lamb 2/27 (5.2 overs)

Leicestershire won by 5 wickets
County Ground, Bristol
Umpires: Paul Baldwin and Graham Lloyd

- Gloucestershire won the toss and elected to bat.
- Play was restricted to 36 overs on Day 1 due to rain.
- Points: Leicestershire 22, Gloucestershire 6.

11–14 June 2023
Scorecard

Sussex	v	Worcestershire
348 (92.4 overs); Oli Carter 76 (132); Joe Leach 6/78 (24 overs)		410 (91.4 overs); Jake Libby 198 (261); Aristides Karvelas 4/54 (17.4 overs)
447/7d (108 overs); Tom Alsop 100* (225); Matthew Waite 2/64 (15 overs)		381/8 (79 overs); Azhar Ali 101 (164); Aristides Karvelas 3/60 (13 overs)

Match drawn
County Ground, Hove
Umpires: Ben Debenham and Mark Newell

- Worcestershire won the toss and elected to field.
- Points: Worcestershire 12, Sussex 10.

25–28 June 2023
Scorecard

Glamorgan	v	Sussex
242 (71.5 overs); Billy Root 66 (120); Nathan McAndrew 4/58 (16.5 overs)		203 (89.4 overs); Fynn Hudson-Prentice 59 (118); James Harris 3/38 (17 overs)
319 (102.4 overs); Sam Northeast 104 (193); Nathan McAndrew 4/47 (20 overs)		273/9 (98 overs); Oli Carter 55* (150); Mitchell Swepson 4/89 (38 overs)

Match drawn
Sophia Gardens, Cardiff
Umpires: Hassan Adnan and Neil Bainton

- Glamorgan won the toss and elected to bat.
- Points: Glamorgan 8, Sussex 8.

25–28 June 2023
Scorecard

Durham	v	Leicestershire
517/6d (112.5 overs); Ollie Robinson 167* (218); Callum Parkinson 2/107 (25.5 overs)		422 (109.4 overs); Colin Ackermann 146 (258); Ben Raine 4/114 (29 overs)
343/4d (61.4 overs); David Bedingham 145* (133); Callum Parkinson 2/124 (18.4 overs)		259/8 (75 overs); Peter Handscomb 136* (201); Ben Raine 4/55 (16 overs)

Match drawn
Grace Road, Leicester
Umpires: Jack Shantry and Chris Watts

- Durham won the toss and elected to bat.
- Points: Durham 13, Leicestershire 10.

25–28 June 2023
Scorecard

Worcestershire	v	Derbyshire
237 (83.3 overs); Jake Libby 78 (187); Anuj Dal 5/45 (18.3 overs)		578/5d (143 overs); Leus du Plooy 238* (356); Dillon Pennington 2/73 (24 overs)
243/6 (109 overs); Gareth Roderick 123 (209); Nick Potts 2/39 (13 overs)

Match drawn
New Road, Worcester
Umpires: Richard Illingworth and Surendiran Shanmugam

- Worcestershire won the toss and elected to bat.
- Rehaan Edavalath (Worcestershire) made his first-class debut.
- Points: Derbyshire 11, Worcestershire 6.

25–28 June 2023
Scorecard

Yorkshire	v	Gloucestershire
550/9d (130 overs); Finlay Bean 114 (153); Matthew Taylor 4/70 (27 overs)		464 (103.2 overs); Ollie Price 113 (162); Dan Moriarty 5/139 (34.2 overs)
200/6d (47.3 overs); Adam Lyth 55 (85); Zafar Gohar 3/63 (18 overs)

Match drawn
Headingley Cricket Ground, Leeds
Umpires: Peter Hartley and Neil Mallender

- Yorkshire won the toss and elected to bat.
- Points: Yorkshire 13, Gloucestershire 12.

=== July ===
10–13 July 2023
Scorecard

Gloucestershire	v	Durham
316 (80.3 overs); Chris Dent 85 (164); Matt Parkinson 3/59 (15 overs)		453 (100.5 overs); Alex Lees 195 (229); Dominic Goodman 4/73 (15.5 overs)
188 (55.3 overs); Miles Hammond 86 (125); Matthew Potts 4/55 (13 overs)		52/1 (11.4 overs); Alex Lees 22 (23); Zafar Gohar 1/17 (3 overs)

Durham won by 9 wickets
Riverside Ground, Chester-le-Street
Umpires: Graham Lloyd and Neil Mallender

- Gloucestershire won the toss and elected to bat
- Points: Durham 24, Gloucestershire 5

10–13 July 2023
Scorecard

Glamorgan	v	Leicestershire
403/9d (98 overs); Michael Neser 176* (202); Matt Salisbury 3/92 (21 overs)		451/6 (92.3 overs); Rishi Patel 179 (237); Zain-ul-Hassan 2/61 (11 overs)

Match drawn
Sophia Gardens, Cardiff
Umpires: Paul Baldwin and Jack Shantry

- Leicestershire won the toss and elected to field.
- Points: Leicestershire 13, Glamorgan 11.

10–13 July 2023
Scorecard

Sussex	v	Derbyshire
402 (101.2 overs); Tom Clark 96 (168); George Scrimshaw 5/49 (16.2 overs)		407 (107 overs); Brooke Guest 105 (236); Aristides Karvelas 4/64 (19 overs)
384/9d (90.3 overs); James Coles 180 (264); Alex Thomson 5/110 (31.1 overs)		361/8 (57.5 overs); Leus du Plooy 128 (117); Henry Shipley 3/66 (11.5 overs)

Match drawn
County Ground, Hove
Umpires: Hassan Adnan and Surendiran Shanmugam

- Derbyshire won the toss and elected to field.
- Points: Sussex 12, Derbyshire 12.

10–13 July 2023
Scorecard

Yorkshire	v	Worcestershire
407 (92.1 overs); Finlay Bean 135 (180); Adam Finch 5/100 (17.1 overs)		242 (89.3 overs); Ben Gibbon 41* (103); Ben Coad 5/33 (21 overs)
		142/2 (48 overs) (f/o); Jake Libby 61* (107); Ben Coad 1/19 (10 overs)

Match drawn
New Road, Worcester
Umpires: David Millns and Chris Watts

- Worcestershire won the toss and elected to field.
- Points: Yorkshire 12, Worcestershire 8.

19–22 July 2023
Scorecard

Derbyshire	v	Durham
443 (120.1 overs); Brooke Guest 197 (319); Scott Borthwick 4/25 (6.1 overs)		575 (118.1 overs); Alex Lees 171 (210); Sam Conners 5/115 (29.1 overs)
89/0 (27 overs); Luis Reece 54* (76)

Match drawn
County Ground, Derby
Umpires: Mark Newell and Jack Shantry

- Durham won the toss and elected to field.
- Points: Durham 12, Derbyshire 10.

19–22 July 2023
Scorecard

Worcestershire	v	Leicestershire
178 (62.3 overs); Azhar Ali 34 (101); Wiaan Mulder 3/27 (10 overs)		110 (39.1 overs); Rehan Ahmed 44 (56); Dillon Pennington 4/36 (14.1 overs)
169 (40.4 overs); Jake Libby 67 (87); Chris Wright 4/44 (12 overs)		137 (40 overs); Lewis Hill 35 (99); Josh Tongue 5/29 (12 overs)

Worcestershire won by 100 runs
Oakham School Ground, Oakham
Umpires: Hassan Adnan and Neil Bainton

- Leicestershire won the toss and elected to field.
- Points: Worcestershire 19, Leicestershire 3.

19–22 July 2023
Scorecard

Sussex	v	Yorkshire
216 (69.5 overs); Fynn Hudson-Prentice 73 (105); Matthew Fisher 4/69 (16 overs)		364/8d (83.2 overs); Adam Lyth 115 (175); Aristides Karvelas 4/76 (16.2 overs)
236/7 (84 overs); Oli Carter 58 (91); Jordan Thompson 2/25 (10 overs)

Match drawn
Headingley Cricket Ground, Leeds
Umpires: Paul Baldwin and James Middlebrook

- Sussex won the toss and elected to field.
- Points: Yorkshire 11, Sussex 7.

20–23 July 2023
Scorecard

Glamorgan	v	Gloucestershire
450/6d (92.5 overs); Billy Root 98 (123); Paul van Meekeren 3/92 (21 overs)		402/6d (108.3 overs); Chris Dent 113 (206); Mitchell Swepson 3/142 (37 overs)
62/0d (16 overs); David Lloyd 38* (58)

Match drawn
College Ground, Cheltenham
Umpires: Neil Pratt and Chris Watts

- Glamorgan won the toss and elected to bat.
- Joe Phillips (Gloucestershire) made his first-class debut.
- Points: Glamorgan 12, Gloucestershire 11.

25–28 July 2023
Scorecard

Glamorgan	v	Derbyshire
521/8d (118 overs); Colin Ingram 136 (200); Luis Reece 2/76 (14 overs)		318 (104.5 overs); Luis Reece 131 (242); Timm van der Gugten 3/94 (28 overs)
		360/0d (112 overs) (f/o); Luis Reece 201* (338)

Match drawn
County Ground, Derby
Umpires: Neil Bainton and Paul Baldwin

- Derbyshire won the toss and elected to field.
- Points: Glamorgan 13, Derbyshire 9.

25–28 July 2023
Scorecard

Yorkshire	v	Durham
340 (87.5 overs); Adam Lyth 111 (188); Matthew Potts 4/93 (25.5 overs)		106/1 (33 overs); Alex Lees 65* (107); Jordan Thompson 1/20 (7 overs)

Match drawn
North Marine Road, Scarborough
Umpires: Steve O'Shaughnessy and Surendiran Shanmugam

- Durham won the toss and elected to field.
- No play was possible on Day 3 due to rain.
- Points: Durham 7, Yorkshire -41.

26–29 July 2023
Scorecard

Worcestershire	v	Gloucestershire
406 (90.5 overs); Brett D'Oliveira 90 (164); Paul van Meekeren 4/93 (18.5 overs)		301 (107.4 overs); Ollie Price 115 (285); Dillon Pennington 3/39 (19 overs)
316/8d (70.2 overs); Jake Libby 117 (171); Paul van Meekeren 5/73 (14 overs)		311 (87.1 overs); Jack Taylor 98 (91); Dillon Pennington 4/63 (20.1 overs)

Worcestershire won by 110 runs
College Ground, Cheltenham
Umpires: Martin Saggers and Jack Shantry

- Gloucestershire won the toss and elected to field.
- Points: Worcestershire 23, Gloucestershire 5.

=== September ===
3–6 September 2023
Scorecard

Sussex	v	Durham
266 (90.3 overs); Tom Alsop 59 (133); Matt Parkinson 4/58 (21.3 overs)		505/9d (119 overs); Graham Clark 128 (189); Henry Crocombe 4/93 (18 overs)
295 (92.1 overs); Oli Carter 80 (153); Matt Parkinson 4/80 (26.1 overs)		57/3 (10.5 overs); Alex Lees 26* (27); Jack Carson 3/15 (3.2 overs)

Durham won by 7 wickets
Riverside Ground, Chester-le-Street
Umpires: Michael Gough and Jack Shantry

- Sussex won the toss and elected to bat.
- Points: Durham 24, Sussex 3.

3–6 September 2023
Scorecard

Gloucestershire	v	Leicestershire
159 (69.5 overs); Chris Dent 51 (141); Tom Scriven 4/30 (16.5 overs)		204 (55.5 overs); Rishi Patel 73 (115); Zaman Akhter 4/46 (14 overs)
212 (71.4 overs); Miles Hammond 46 (73); Wiaan Mulder 4/61 (19.4 overs)		168-2 (41.4 overs); Colin Ackermann 93 not out Josh Shaw 2/24 (10 overs)

Leicestershire won by 8 wickets
Grace Road, Leicester
Umpires: Naeem Ashraf and Peter Hartley

- Leicestershire won the toss and elected to bowl.
- Luke Charlesworth (Gloucestershire) made his first-class debut.
- Points: Leicestershire 19, Gloucestershire 3.

3–6 September 2023
Scorecard

Worcestershire	v	Glamorgan
284 (92 overs); Brett D'Oliveira 74 (139); Jamie McIlroy 3/41 (17 overs)		170 (48 overs); Chris Cooke 38 (44); Logan van Beek 4/42 (12 overs)
145 (56.5 overs); Jake Libby 40 (93); Jamie McIlroy 5/34 (15.5 overs)		179 (52.1 overs); Billy Root 84 not out Logan van Beek 4/46 (12.1 overs)

Worcestershire won by 80 runs
New Road, Worcester
Umpires: Neil Bainton and Surendiran Shanmugam

- Glamorgan won the toss and elected to bowl.
- Ben Kellaway (Glamorgan) made his first-class debut.
- Points: Worcestershire 20, Glamorgan 3.

3–6 September 2023
Scorecard

Yorkshire	v	Derbyshire
297 (76.5 overs); James Wharton 58 (114); Anuj Dal 5/72 (20 overs)		247 (74.1 overs); Wayne Madsen 93 (140); Jordan Thompson 3/48 (20.1 overs)
520/9d (105.4 overs); Matthew Revis 106 (142); Alex Thomson 5/190 (38.4 overs)		293 (71.2 overs); Wayne Madsen 93 (71); Dom Bess 4/79 (24.2 overs)

Yorkshire won by 277 runs
North Marine Road, Scarborough
Umpires: Anthony Harris and Neil Pratt

- Derbyshire won the toss and elected to bowl.
- Points: Yorkshire 18, Derbyshire 3.

10–13 September 2023
Scorecard

Yorkshire	v	Glamorgan
500 (122 overs); Shan Masood 192 (256); James Harris 3/131 (28 overs)		273 (89.2 overs); Kiran Carlson 64 (89); Matt Revis 5/50 (16.2 overs)
		401/5d (118 overs); Sam Northeast 166*(296); Dom Bess 2/112 (41 overs)

Match drawn
Sophia Gardens, Cardiff
Umpires: Peter Hartley and Mark Newell

- Yorkshire won the toss and elected to bat.
- Ben Cliff (Yorkshire) made his first-class debut.
- Points: Yorkshire 13, Glamorgan 8.

10–13 September 2023
Scorecard

Gloucestershire	v	Derbyshire
377 (97.1 overs); Ollie Price 132 (194); Anuj Dal 6/69 (23.1 overs)		403 (112.4 overs); Leus du Plooy 108* (164); Zafar Gohar 5/122 (39.4 overs)
208/6d (72 overs); Graeme van Buuren 48* (100); Alex Thomson 4/79 (28 overs)

Match drawn
County Ground, Bristol
Umpires: Tom Lungley and Jack Shantry

- Gloucestershire won the toss and elected to bat.
- Ed Middleton (Gloucestershire) made his first-class debut.
- Points: Gloucestershire 11, Derbyshire 11.

10–13 September 2023
Scorecard

Sussex	v	Leicestershire
262 (72.1 overs); Fynn Hudson-Prentice 65 (92); Matt Salisbury 5/73 (17.1 overs)		108 (42.4 overs); Rishi Patel 48 (120); Aristides Karvelas 4/14 (12 overs)
344/9d (102 overs); Tom Clark 69 (160); Tom Scriven 4/55 (20 overs)		483 (132.4 overs); Colin Ackermann 136 (190); Jaydev Unadkat 6/94 (32.4 overs)

Sussex won by 15 runs
County Ground, Hove
Umpires: Paul Baldwin and Ben Debenham

- Leicestershire won the toss and elected to field.
- Points: Sussex 8, Leicestershire 3.

19–22 September 2023
Scorecard

Sussex	v	Derbyshire
100 (36.2 overs); Tom Clark 31 (69); Sam Conners 4/32 (13 overs)		229/6d (50.4 overs); Luis Reece 86 (108); Sean Hunt 3/59 (14 overs)
84/3 (32.3 overs); Tom Clark 36* (104); Alex Thomson 1/9 (7 overs)

Match drawn
County Ground, Derby
Umpires: Neil Mallender and Paul Baldwin

- Derbyshire won the toss and elected to field.
- No play was possible on Day 1 and Day 2 due to rain.
- Points: Sussex 6, Derbyshire 8.

19–22 September 2023
Scorecard

Yorkshire	v	Leicestershire
155 (39.2 overs); Finlay Bean 40 (55); Will Davis 4/28 (8 overs)		233 (53.1 overs); Harry Swindells 73 (78); George Hill 4/69 (16 overs)
225/4 (55.4 overs); Adam Lyth 60 (98); Tom Scriven 2/67 (18.4 overs)

Match drawn
Grace Road, Leicester
Umpires: Neil Bainton and Neil Pratt

- Leicestershire won the toss and elected to field.
- No play was possible on Day 2 due to rain.
- Points: Yorkshire 8, Leicestershire 7.

19–22 September 2023
Scorecard

Worcestershire	v	Durham
313 (83 overs); Brett D'Oliveira 63 (75); Ben Raine 3/66 (22 overs)		371/4 (71 overs); Scott Borthwick 134* (197); Ben Allison 2/61 (12 overs)

Match drawn
New Road, Worcester
Umpires: Ben Debenham and James Middlebrook

- Durham won the toss and elected to field.
- No play was possible on Day 2 due to rain.
- Points: Worcestershire 8, Durham 11.

26–29 September 2023
Scorecard

Durham	v	Leicestershire
457/8d (103 overs); David Bedingham 156 (206); Tom Scriven 4/81 (27 overs)		143 (38 overs); Ben Cox 30* (55); Ben Raine 5/51 (16 overs)
		173 (48.5 overs) (f/o); Will Davis 58 (68); Matt Parkinson 3/27 (9.5 overs)

Durham won by an innings and 141 runs
Riverside Ground, Chester-le-Street
Umpires: Rob Bailey and Tom Lungley

- Leicestershire won the toss and elected to field.
- Points: Durham 24, Leicestershire 2.

26–29 September 2023
Scorecard

Glamorgan	v	Derbyshire
301/5d (81.5 overs); Colin Ingram 82 (97); Alex Thomson 4/97 (21.5 overs)		450/8d (127 overs); Luis Reece 139 (276); James Harris 3/85 (24 overs)
135/6 (69 overs); Eddie Byrom 32 (49); Zak Chappell 2/19 (14 overs)		234/2d (44.3 overs); Luis Reece 119* (125); Kiran Carlson 2/55 (14.3 overs)

Match drawn
Sophia Gardens, Cardiff
Umpires: Graham Lloyd and Sue Redfern

- Glamorgan won the toss and elected to field.
- Points: Glamorgan 8, Derbyshire 9.

26–29 September 2023
Scorecard

Sussex	v	Gloucestershire
202 (58.1 overs); Tom Haines 62 (87); Matt Taylor 5/24 (13 overs)		195 (51.1 overs); Miles Hammond 48 (54); Jack Carson 3/19 (6.1 overs)
505/7d (118 overs); James Coles 128 (158); Josh Shaw 4/82 (23 overs)		173 (43.5 overs); Graeme van Buuren 67 (74); Bradley Currie 3/27 (11 overs)

Sussex won by 339 runs
County Ground, Hove
Umpires: Jack Shantry and Neil Bainton

- Gloucestershire won the toss and elected to field.
- Points: Sussex 19, Gloucestershire 2.

26–29 September 2023
Scorecard

Yorkshire	v	Worcestershire
262/6d (60 overs); George Hill 52 (78); Dillon Pennington 2/49 (12 overs)		389 (102 overs); Brett D'Oliveira 103 (203); Dom Bess 3/55 (21 overs)
363/4 (67 overs); Shan Masood 123 (131); Josh Baker 3/117 (21 overs)		232/2d (30.1 overs); Jack Haynes 113 (84); Matt Milnes 1/11 (5 overs)

Yorkshire won by 6 wickets
Headingley Cricket Ground, Leeds
Umpires: Steve O'Shaughnessy and Surendiran Shanmugam

- Yorkshire won the toss and elected to field.
- Points: Yorkshire 20, Worcestershire 5.

== Standings ==
Teams in both divisions played a total of 14 games, with seven home matches and seven away matches. There was a two-up, two-down promotion and relegation system.

Teams receive 16 points for a win, 8 for a tie and 5 for a draw. Bonus points (a maximum of 5 batting points and 3 bowling points) may be scored during the first 110 overs of each team's first innings.

=== Division One ===
Pos	Team	Pld	W	L	T	D	Bat	Bowl	Ded	Pts	
1	Surrey (C)	14	8	2	0	4	27	41	0	216	Champions
2	Essex	14	7	3	0	4	25	39	0	196	
3	Hampshire	14	8	4	0	2	18	39	3	192	
4	Warwickshire	14	6	4	0	4	22	41	0	179	
5	Lancashire	14	3	1	0	10	29	35	1	161	
6	Nottinghamshire	14	4	4	0	6	18	39	0	151	
7	Somerset	14	3	4	0	7	25	40	0	148	
8	Kent	14	2	7	0	5	20	34	0	111	
9	Middlesex (Note: Middlesex's points include 8 for batting last in a drawn match where the scores finished level.) (R)	14	3	9	0	2	5	39	1	104	Relegation to Division 2
10	Northamptonshire (R)	14	2	8	0	4	10	34	0	96	Relegation to Division 2

Source: ESPNCricinfo, ECB, BBC
(C) Champion; (R) Relegated

=== Division Two ===
Pos	Team	Pld	W	L	T	D	Bat	Bowl	Ded	Pts	
1	Durham (P)	14	7	1	0	6	54	39	2	233	Promotion to Division 1
2	Worcestershire (P)	14	5	3	0	6	21	36	0	167	Promotion to Division 1
3	Sussex	14	3	1	0	10	29	39	16	150	
4	Leicestershire	14	3	4	0	7	25	35	0	143	
5	Glamorgan	14	1	1	0	12	29	34	0	139	
6	Derbyshire	14	0	4	0	10	25	38	0	113	
7	Yorkshire	14	3	2	0	8	31	35	50	109	
8	Gloucestershire	14	0	6	0	7	23	35	0	98	

Source: ESPNCricinfo, ECB, BBC
- Yorkshire was deducted 48 points by the ECB for the handling of the Azeem Rafiq scandal and a further two points for slow over rates.
- Sussex was deducted 12 points by the ECB for receiving four fixed penalties during the season.
  (P) Promoted
