= Tom Scriven =

English cricketer (born 1998)

Personal information
- Full name: Thomas Antony Rhys Scriven
- Born: 18 November 1998 (age 27); Oxford, Oxfordshire, England
- Batting: Right-handed
- Bowling: Right-arm fast-medium
- Role: All-rounder

Domestic team information
- Years: Team
- 2018–2021: Hampshire (squad no. 33)
- 2022–present: Leicestershire (squad no. 88)
- First-class debut: 15 August 2020 Hampshire v Surrey
- List A debut: 22 July 2021 Hampshire v Essex

Career statistics
Competition	FC	LA	T20
Matches	47	45	23
Runs scored	1,571	462	110
Batting average	29.64	30.80	10.00
100s/50s	0/12	0/1	0/0
Top score	99	55	23
Balls bowled	5,849	1,835	348
Wickets	97	53	19
Bowling average	35.67	32.33	25.63
5 wickets in innings	1	1	0
10 wickets in match	0	0	0
Best bowling	5/46	5/66	4/21
Catches/stumpings	10/–	8/–	6/–
- Source: Cricinfo, 26 September 2026

Thomas Antony Rhys Scriven (born 18 November 1998) is an English cricketer who plays for Leicestershire. He is a right handed batter and right-arm fast medium bowler. He previously played for Hampshire, making his debut in 2018, and joined Leicestershire prior to the 2022 season.

== Career ==
He made his Twenty20 debut for Hampshire against Gloucestershire in the 2018 t20 Blast on 17 August 2018. Prior to his T20 debut, he was named in England's squad for the 2018 Under-19 Cricket World Cup.

In December 2019, he was awarded a Rookie contract for Hampshire during the 2020 season. He made his first-class debut on 15 August 2020, for Hampshire in the 2020 Bob Willis Trophy. He made his List A debut on 22 July 2021, for Hampshire in the 2021 Royal London One-Day Cup.

He went on to make nine first-team appearances for Hampshire after making his debut in 2018, including two appearances in first-class cricket, and featured more prominently in their second-XI. He joined fellow county championship club Leicestershire in October 2021. He signed a new two-year contract with the club in July 2023 following performances described as "impressive in both red and white-ball cricket for the first team during the past year" by Leicestershire director of cricket Claude Henderson.

He took his maiden five-wicket haul in first-class cricket for Leicestershire in the County Championship against Lancashire away at Old Trafford on 19 April 2025, as he finished with figures of 5-46 from 20 overs in Lancashire's first innings.

In January 2026, Scriven signed a new contract with Leicestershire tying him into the club until at least the end of the 2027 season.

== Personal life ==
He was educated at Magdalen College School in Oxford, where he played first-XI cricket with fellow future professional cricketers Tom and Ollie Price.
