= Tom Lawes (cricketer) =

English cricketer (born 2002)

Personal information
- Full name: Thomas Edward Lawes
- Born: 25 December 2002 (age 23)
- Batting: Right-handed
- Bowling: Right-arm medium-fast
- Role: Bowling all-rounder

Domestic team information
- Years: Team
- 2022–present: Surrey (squad no. 30)
- 2023: Oval Invincibles (squad no. 30)
- 2024–2026: Sunrisers Leeds (squad no. 18)
- First-class debut: 20 May 2022; Surrey v SLC Development XI
- List A debut: 2 August 2022 Surrey v Leicestershire

Career statistics
Competition	FC	LA	T20
Matches	43	14	35
Runs scored	986	455	68
Batting average	20.97	37.91	7.55
100s/50s	0/4	0/4	0/0
Top score	83	75	13*
Balls bowled	5,577	599	517
Wickets	113	17	26
Bowling average	29.64	36.64	33.84
5 wickets in innings	4	0	0
10 wickets in match	0	0	0
Best bowling	5/22	4/40	3/26
Catches/stumpings	14/–	4/–	13/–
- Source: Cricinfo, 27 September 2026

Thomas Edward Lawes (born 25 December 2002) is an English cricketer who plays for Surrey.

== Career ==
He made his first-class debut on 20 May 2022 for Surrey against the Sri Lanka Cricket Development XI side during their tour of England. He made his Twenty20 debut on 24 June 2022 for Surrey against Essex in the 2022 T20 Blast.

Lawes made his List A debut on 2 August 2022 for Surrey in the 2022 One-Day Cup match against Leicestershire at Guildford. Lawes was part of the Surrey team that won the 2022 and 2023 County Championship seasons.

In July 2023 Lawes was selected by the Oval Invincibles for the 2023 season of The Hundred as an injury replacement for fast bowler Saqib Mahmood. On 21 August 2023 Lawes signed a new multi-year contract with Surrey.

He was included in the England Lions squad to tour Australia in January 2025.
