= Jordan Clark (cricketer) =

English cricketer (born 1990)

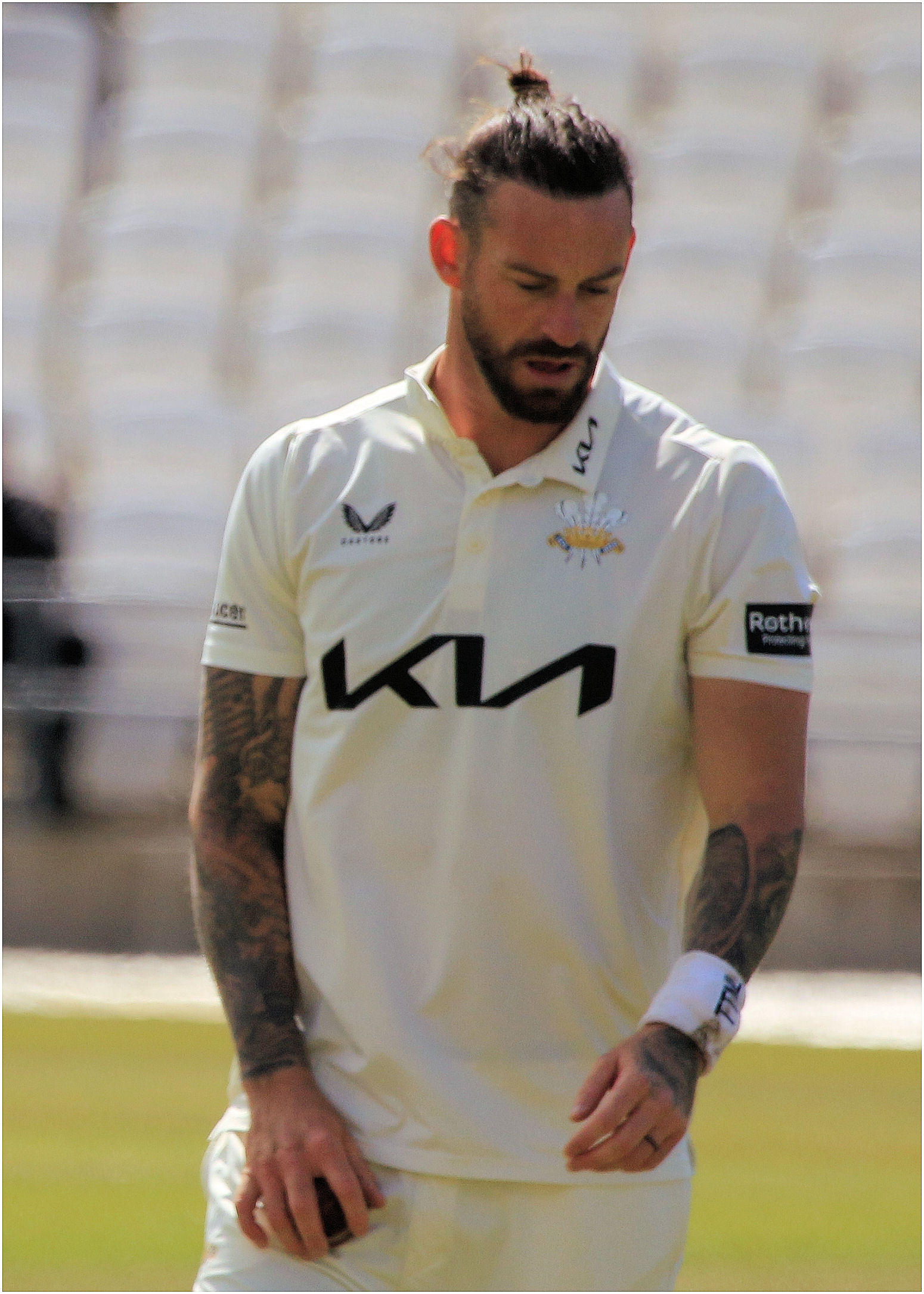
- Clark in 2026

Personal information
- Born: 14 October 1990 (age 36); Whitehaven, Cumbria, England
- Height: 6 ft 4 in (1.93 m)
- Batting: Right-handed
- Bowling: Right-arm medium
- Role: All-rounder
- Relatives: Graham Clark (brother)

Domestic team information
- Years: Team
- 2010–2018: Lancashire (squad no. 16)
- 2018/19: Hobart Hurricanes
- 2019–present: Surrey (squad no. 16)
- 2021, 2025: Oval Invincibles
- 2024: Northern Superchargers
- 2026: Welsh Fire
- First-class debut: 26 April 2015 Lancashire v Kent
- List A debut: 4 September 2010 Lancashire v Worcestershire

Career statistics
Competition	FC	LA	T20
Matches	122	53	150
Runs scored	4,134	1,028	1,286
Batting average	28.31	31.15	20.09
100s/50s	4/25	0/6	0/1
Top score	140	79*	60
Balls bowled	16,860	1,530	1,723
Wickets	301	36	91
Bowling average	30.77	45.55	28.20
5 wickets in innings	8	0	0
10 wickets in match	0	0	0
Best bowling	6/21	4/34	4/22
Catches/stumpings	19/–	9/–	47/–
- Source: ESPNcricinfo, 23 August 2026

Jordan Clark (born 14 October 1990) is an English cricketer who plays for Surrey. Clark is a right-handed batsman who bowls right-arm medium pace, and occasionally fields as a wicket-keeper. He was born in Whitehaven, Cumbria and was educated at Sedbergh School.

Clark made his debut for Cumberland in the 2007 Minor Counties Championship against Norfolk. The following season he played two further matches in that competition, against Buckinghamshire and Norfolk again. Clark joined Lancashire's Academy in 2008; after two years in the academy, he was given a scholarship with Lancashire in January 2010. Having represented the Lancashire Second XI in since 2008, Clark made his debut for Lancashire in Lancashire's last List A match in the 2010 Clydesdale Bank 40 against Worcestershire. He scored 32 runs before being dismissed by Jack Shantry. In the winter of 2010/11 Clark suffered a stress fracture to the back.

At the start of the 2011 season, Clark's scholarship was renewed and, in June, he made his Twenty20 debut. He scored 19 runs from 11 balls as Lancashire tied with Derbyshire. In October Clark signed his first full-time professional contract with Lancashire.

On 24 April 2013 in a second XI game for Lancashire against Yorkshire at North Marine Road Ground, Scarborough, he became only the fifth player to hit six sixes off an over in a professional game, scoring the runs against left-arm spinner Gurman Randhawa.

On 22 July 2018, Clark removed England captain Joe Root, New Zealand captain Kane Williamson, and England batsman Jonny Bairstow in consecutive balls to secure a hat-trick in the County Championship roses match against Yorkshire. Clark took 5–58 in this innings, his maiden first-class 5 wicket haul.

In September 2018, he was named in the Hobart Hurricanes' squad for the 2018 Abu Dhabi T20 Trophy. Having scored more than 5,000 runs and taken over 150 wickets for Lancashire, he moved to Surrey in 2019, and was described as the "underestimated lynchpin" of the team that won back-to-back County Championship titles in 2022 and 2023.
