= Rehaan Edavalath =

English cricketer (born 2004)

Personal information
- Full name: Rehaan Mahamood Edavalath
- Born: 4 March 2004 (age 22); Wolverhampton, West Midlands, England
- Batting: Right-handed
- Bowling: Right-arm off break

Domestic team information
- Years: Team
- 2023–present: Worcestershire (squad no. 11)
- FC debut: 25 June 2023 Worcestershire v Derbyshire
- List A debut: 24 July 2024 Worcestershire v Middlesex

Career statistics
| Competition | FC | LA |
|---|---|---|
| Matches | 10 | 10 |
| Runs scored | 283 | 32 |
| Batting average | 17.68 | 4.57 |
| 100s/50s | 0/2 | 0/0 |
| Top score | 63 | 15 |
| Catches/stumpings | 8/– | 3/– |
- Source: Cricinfo, 27 September 2026

Rehaan Mahamood Edavalath (born 4 March 2004) is an English cricketer, who is a right handed batter and right-arm off break bowler; and plays for Worcestershire.

== Early life ==
Born in Wolverhampton, he featured for Herefordshire in Minor Counties. He completed his schooling at Newcastle-under-Lyme School at Staffordshire. And he completed his college at Malvern College at Worcestershire. In July 2022, he joined the Worcestershire 2nd XI team and signed a rookie contract. In 2022 he was spent some times in Indian cricket academies (CSK Academy in Chennai and Karnataka Institute of Cricket in Bangalore) for improve and develop his game.

== Career ==
He signed a professional contract with Worcestershire CCC in September 2023. He made his first-class debut against Derbyshire in the 2023 County Championship on 25 June 2023. He made his List A debut against Middlesex in One-Day Cup debut on 24 July 2024.
