= Brett Hutton =

English cricketer (born 1993)

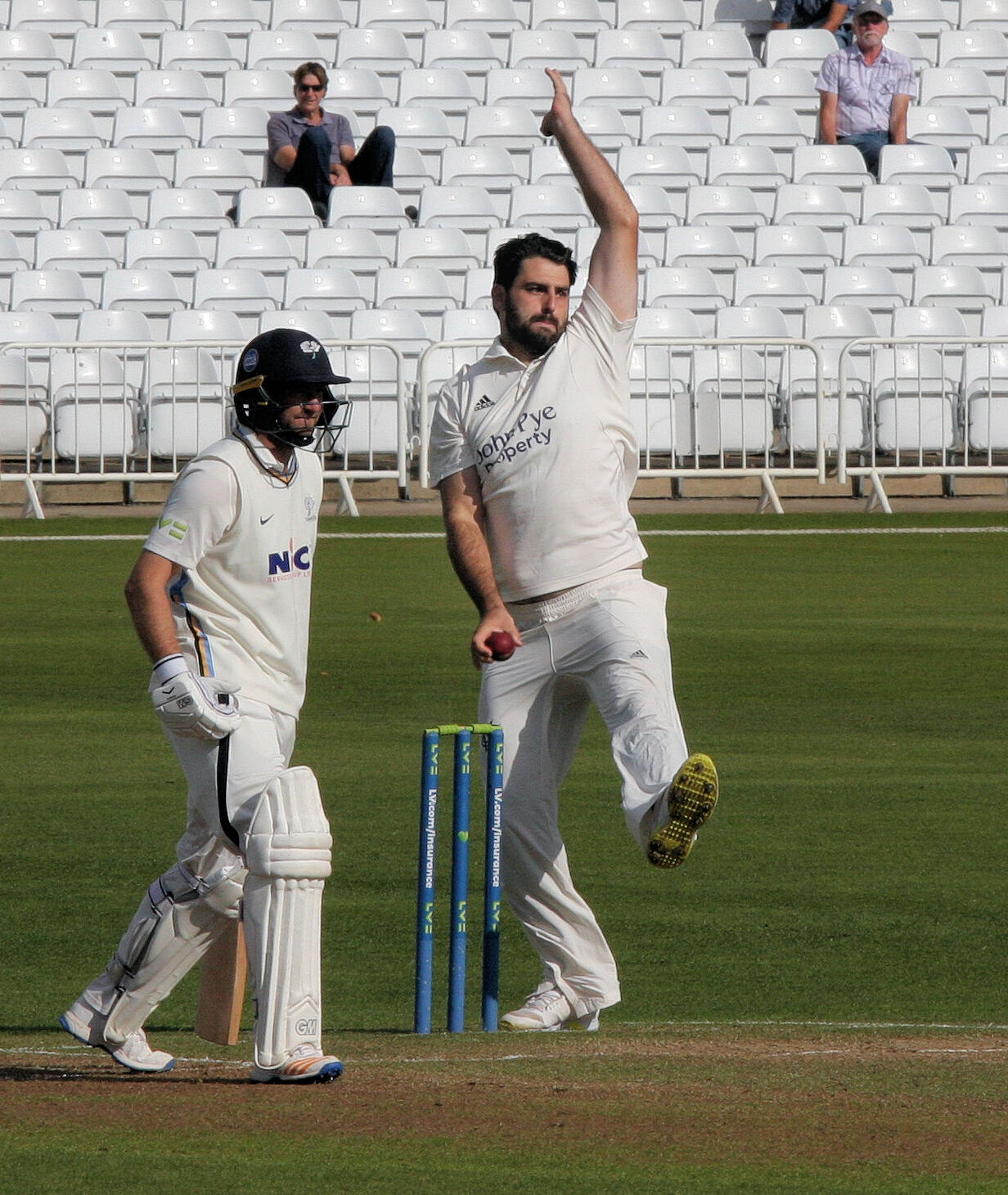
- Hutton in 2021

Personal information
- Full name: Brett Alan Hutton
- Born: 6 February 1993 (age 33); Doncaster, South Yorkshire, England
- Batting: Right-handed
- Bowling: Right-arm medium-fast

Domestic team information
- Years: Team
- 2011–2017: Nottinghamshire (squad no. 26)
- 2018–2020: Northamptonshire (squad no. 16)
- 2021–present: Nottinghamshire (squad no. 16)
- First-class debut: 27 March 2011 Nottinghamshire v MCC
- List A debut: 10 August 2011 Nottinghamshire v Sri Lanka A

Career statistics
Competition	FC	LA	T20
Matches	111	57	9
Runs scored	2,482	482	50
Batting average	17.11	16.06	16.66
100s/50s	0/8	0/0	0/0
Top score	84	46	18*
Balls bowled	18,557	2,619	172
Wickets	376	76	5
Bowling average	26.26	28.61	51.00
5 wickets in innings	18	2	0
10 wickets in match	2	0	0
Best bowling	8/57	7/26	2/28
Catches/stumpings	58/–	15/–	3/–
- Source: Cricinfo, 26 September 2026

Brett Alan Hutton (born 6 February 1993) is an English cricketer who plays for Nottinghamshire. He is a right-handed batsman and bowls right-arm medium pace.

== Career ==
Born in Doncaster, Yorkshire, Hutton attended Worksop College in north Nottinghamshire where he was the recipient of a cricket scholarship.

He made his first-class debut for Nottinghamshire against the Marylebone Cricket Club in the Champion County match at the start of the 2011 season at the Sheikh Zayed Cricket Stadium in Abu Dhabi. In this match, he was dismissed in Nottinghamshire's first-innings by Steve Kirby for nine runs, while in their second-innings he was dismissed for a duck by Mohammad Nabi. With the ball, he bowled a total of 18 wicket-less overs in the match. Later in that season he made his List A debut against Sri Lanka A. He scored 17 unbeaten runs in this match, while with the ball he took the wicket of Nilanka Premaratne. Hutton made a further List A appearance later in the season against Lancashire in the Clydesdale Bank 40. He made his Twenty20 debut on 20 May 2016 for Nottinghamshire against Birmingham Bears in the 2016 NatWest t20 Blast.

In September 2017, Hutton left Nottinghamshire to join Northamptonshire on a three-year contract in order to play more one-day cricket. In June 2021, during the 2021 County Championship, Hutton took his 200th first-class wicket.

Having rejoined Nottinghamshire in 2020, Hutton was the leading wicket-taker in the 2023 County Championship with 62 dismissals and was named the club's player of the year. He was also Nottinghamshire's top wicket-taker in the One-Day Cup in 2022 and 2023 and signed a new two-year contract with the club in February 2024. His 2022 haul included a List A career-best 7/26 against Surrey.
