= Lyndon James =

English cricketer (born 1998)

Personal information
- Full name: Lyndon Wallace James
- Born: 27 December 1998 (age 27); Worksop, Nottinghamshire, England
- Batting: Right-handed
- Bowling: Right-arm fast-medium

Domestic team information
- Years: Team
- 2018–present: Nottinghamshire (squad no. 45)
- First-class debut: 10 September 2018 Notts v Essex
- List A debut: 1 May 2019 Notts v Worcestershire

Career statistics
Competition	FC	LA	T20
Matches	80	46	42
Runs scored	3,479	951	537
Batting average	34.10	27.97	16.78
100s/50s	6/15	0/5	0/2
Top score	203*	82	51
Balls bowled	7,580	1,307	249
Wickets	121	38	11
Bowling average	36.17	35.31	37.45
5 wickets in innings	3	1	0
10 wickets in match	0	0	0
Best bowling	6/74	5/48	3/31
Catches/stumpings	42/–	20/–	13/–
- Source: Cricinfo, 26 September 2026

Lyndon Wallace James (born 27 December 1998) is an English cricketer who plays for Nottinghamshire.

== Career ==
James made his first-class debut for Nottinghamshire in the 2018 County Championship against Essex on 10 September 2018.

He made his List A debut on 1 May 2019, for Nottinghamshire against Worcestershire in the 2019 Royal London One-Day Cup. and his Twenty20 debut on 13 June 2021, in a T20 Blast win over against Northamptonshire.

In April 2022, in the County Championship, James scored his maiden century in first-class cricket against Durham. The next month he hit a career-best 155 against Middlesex. James raised his career-high first-class score again in September 2022, with 164 not out against Durham. At the end of the 2022 season he signed a new four-year contract with Nottinghamshire having scored 890 runs at an average of 52.35 as the club won the Division Two title.

He was selected in successive England Lions squad which took part training camps in the United Arab Emirates during the winters of 2022 and 2023.

On 17 July 2024, James made his first T20 half-century for Nottinghamshire against Lancashire at Old Trafford.

James was named in the England Lions squad for a four-day match against Sri Lanka in August 2024.

He signed a new three-year contract with Nottinghamshire in April 2025.

On 23 July 2025, James made his maiden first-class double century, scoring 203 not out against Hampshire at the Utilita Bowl.
