= Tom Price (cricketer) =

English cricketer (born 2000)

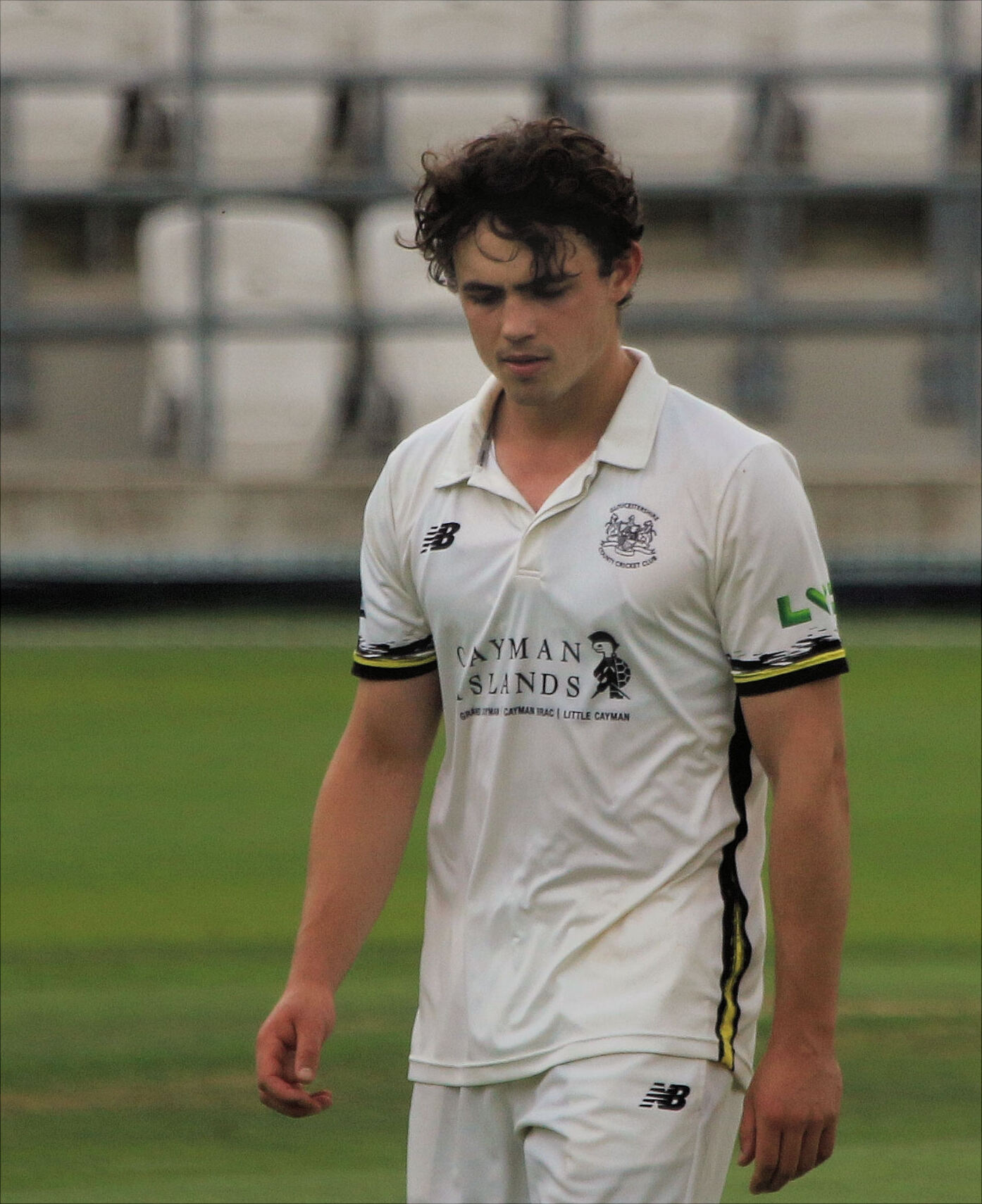
- Price in 2023

Personal information
- Full name: Thomas James Price
- Born: 2 January 2000 (age 26); Oxford, Oxfordshire, England
- Batting: Right-handed
- Bowling: Right-arm medium
- Role: All-rounder
- Relatives: Ollie Price (brother)

Domestic team information
- Years: Team
- 2019–2025: Gloucestershire (squad no. 53)
- 2026–: Sussex (squad no. 53)
- First-class debut: 1 August 2020 Gloucestershire v Worcestershire
- List A debut: 30 June 2019 Gloucestershire v Australia A

Career statistics
Competition	FC	LA	T20
Matches	42	19	15
Runs scored	1,541	286	97
Batting average	29.07	20.42	10.77
100s/50s	1/8	0/1	0/0
Top score	109	55	25
Balls bowled	5,862	853	204
Wickets	115	19	5
Bowling average	29.27	42.52	62.80
5 wickets in innings	5	0	0
10 wickets in match	1	0	0
Best bowling	8/27	4/26	1/10
Catches/stumpings	13/–	7/–	9/–
- Source: Cricinfo, 26 September 2026

Thomas James Price (born 2 January 2000) is an English cricketer.

== Personal ==
Price was educated at Magdalen College School and Durham University.

== Career ==
Price played youth team cricket for Great & Little Tew Cricket Club in Oxfordshire, and represented the county at age-group level before joining the academy at Gloucestershire. He signed his first professional contract with Gloucestershire in January 2020, having made his List A debut for the club on 30 June 2019, in a match against Australia A. He made his first-class debut on 1 August 2020 against Worcestershire in the 2020 Bob Willis Trophy, taking one wicket in the first innings and collecting a pair with the bat. He made his Twenty20 debut on 29 May 2022, for Gloucestershire against the Sri Lanka Cricket Development XI during their tour of England.

On 20 April 2023, in the County Championship match against Worcestershire, Price scored his maiden first-class century, along with taking a hat-trick. With this, he also became the first cricketer in the history of first-class cricket to score a century and take a hat-trick on the same day.

In July 2025, it was announced that Price would be joining Sussex on a three-year contract at the end of the season.
