= Alex Thomson (cricketer) =

English cricketer (born 1993)

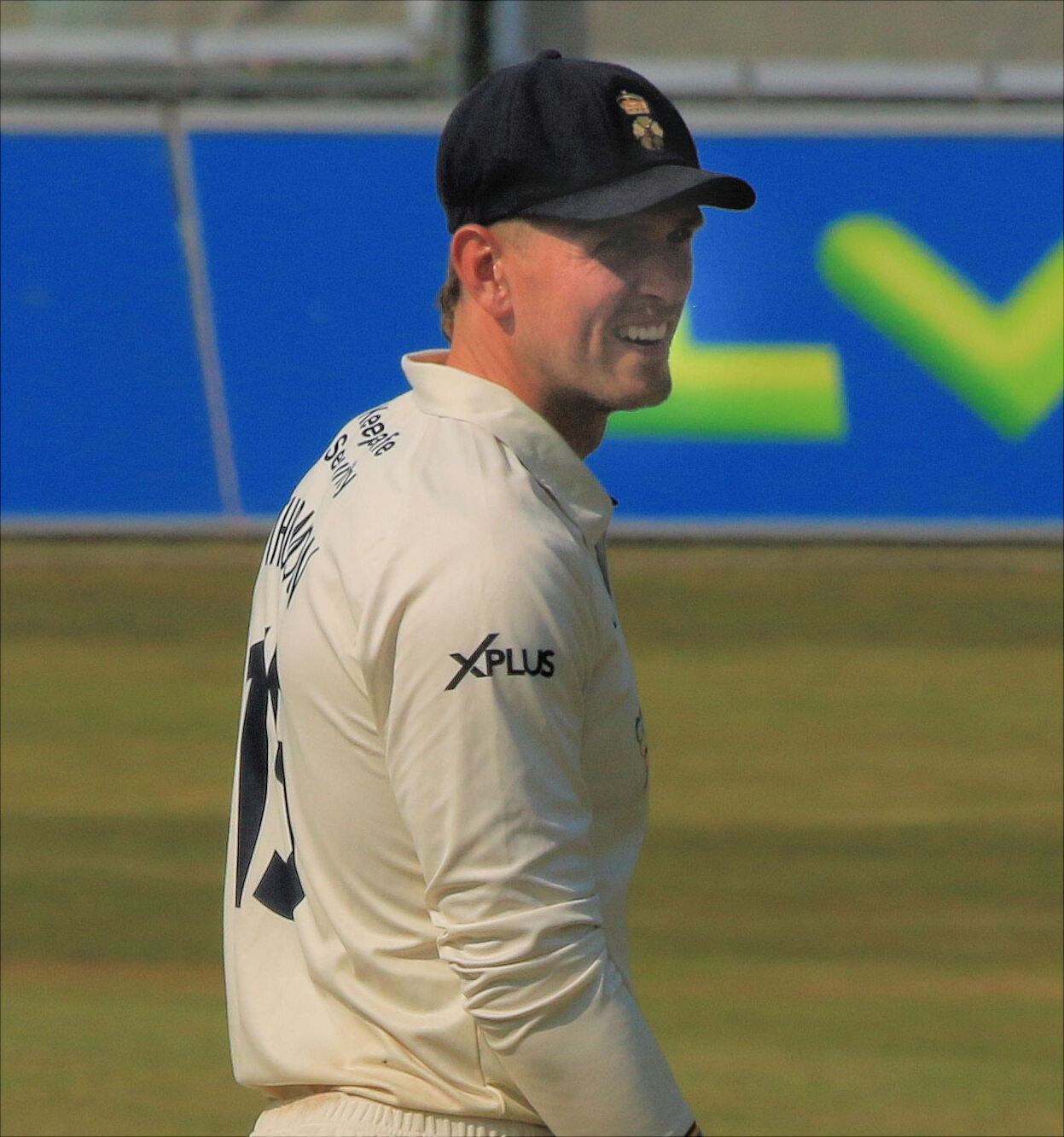
- Thomson in 2023

Personal information
- Full name: Alexander Thomas Thomson
- Born: 30 October 1993 (age 33); Stoke-on-Trent, Staffordshire, England
- Height: 6 ft 4 in (1.93 m)
- Batting: Right-handed
- Bowling: Right-arm off break
- Role: All-rounder

Domestic team information
- Years: Team
- 2014–2017: Cardiff MCCU
- 2017–2021: Warwickshire (squad no. 29)
- 2021: → Durham (on loan)
- 2021: → Derbyshire (on loan)
- 2022–2025: Derbyshire (squad no. 15)
- First-class debut: 1 April 2014; Cardiff MCCU v Glamorgan
- List A debut: 17 June 2018; Warwickshire v West Indies A

Career statistics
Competition	FC	LA	T20
Matches	51	26	39
Runs scored	1,139	441	198
Batting average	17.25	31.50	16.50
100s/50s	0/4	0/2	0/0
Top score	60	68*	28
Balls bowled	8,750	1,050	678
Wickets	121	31	26
Bowling average	39.52	31.64	37.88
5 wickets in innings	5	0	0
10 wickets in match	1	0	0
Best bowling	7/65	3/25	4/35
Catches/stumpings	21/–	7/–	6/–
- Source: Cricinfo, 26 July 2025

Alexander Thomas Thomson (born 30 October 1993) is an English cricketer. He made his debut for Warwickshire in the 2017 County Championship on 19 September 2017. He made his List A debut for Warwickshire against the West Indies A team in a tri-series warm-up match on 17 June 2018. He made his Twenty20 debut for Warwickshire in the 2018 t20 Blast on 10 August 2018.
