= Fynn Hudson-Prentice =

English cricketer (born 1996)

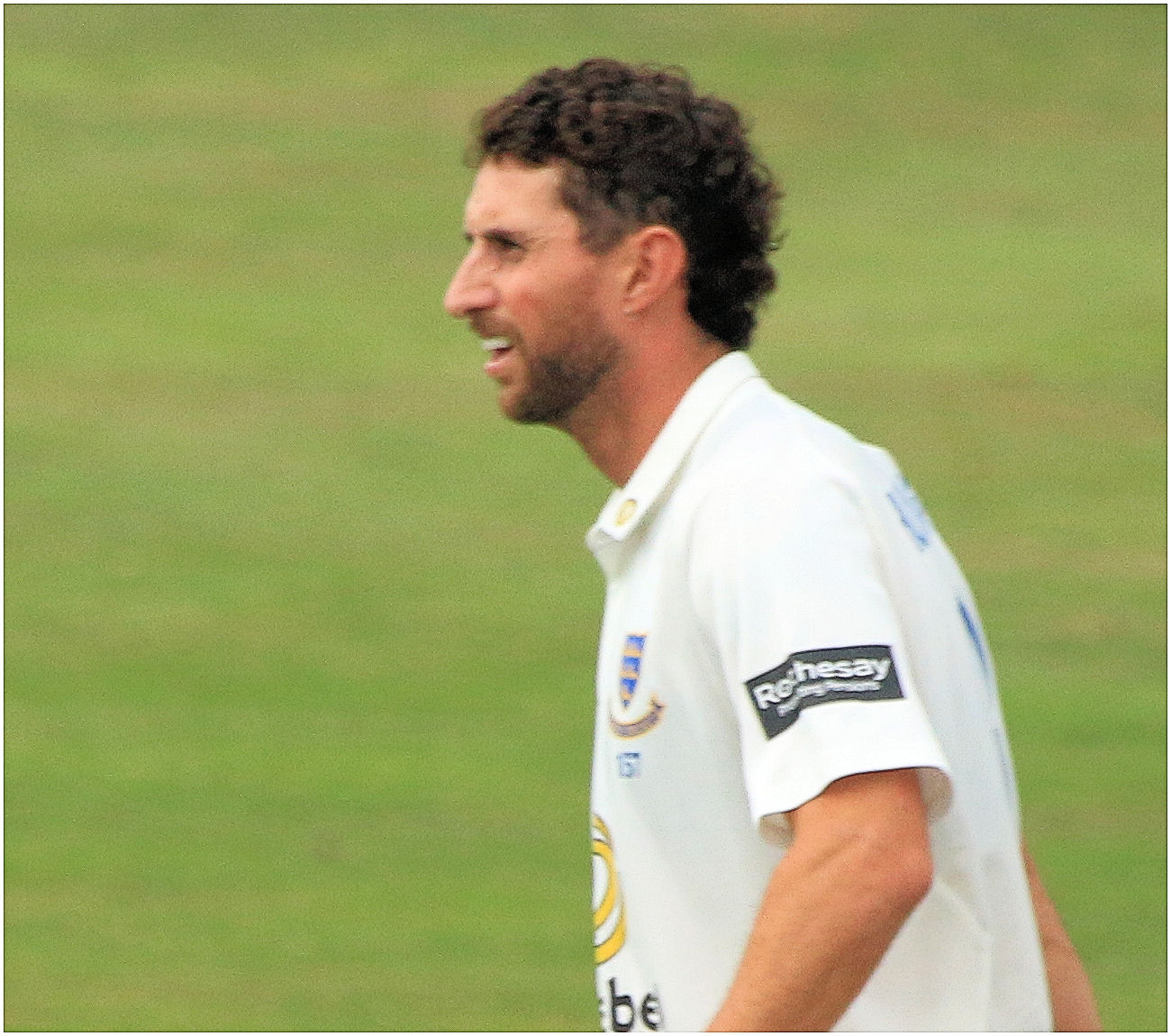
- Hudson-Prentice in 2025

Personal information
- Full name: Fynn Jake Hudson-Prentice
- Born: 12 January 1996 (age 30); Haywards Heath, West Sussex, England
- Height: 1.84 m (6 ft 0 in)
- Batting: Right-handed
- Bowling: Right-arm medium-fast
- Role: All-rounder

Domestic team information
- Years: Team
- 2014–2016: Sussex (squad no. 14)
- 2019–2021: Derbyshire (squad no. 33)
- 2021: → Sussex (loan) (squad no. 33)
- 2022–2026: Sussex (squad no. 33)
- 2025: → Derbyshire (loan) (squad no. 17)
- First-class debut: 7 June 2015 Sussex v Hampshire
- List A debut: 20 August 2014 Sussex v Glamorgan

Career statistics
Competition	FC	LA	T20
Matches	77	35	59
Runs scored	3,001	1,055	583
Batting average	27.53	37.67	16.19
100s/50s	0/19	0/10	0/0
Top score	99	93	49*
Balls bowled	7,823	1,379	765
Wickets	126	39	40
Bowling average	34.50	35.38	31.62
5 wickets in innings	3	1	0
10 wickets in match	0	0	0
Best bowling	5/40	5/62	3/36
Catches/stumpings	27/–	12/–	25/–
- Source: CricketArchive, 26 September 2026

Fynn Jake Hudson-Prentice (born 12 January 1996) is an English cricketer who plays for Sussex County Cricket Club. He is a right-handed batsman who bowls right-arm medium-fast.

He previously played for Sussex and Derbyshire.

He made his List A debut for Sussex against Glamorgan in the 2014 Royal London One-Day Cup, on 20 August 2014.

On 24 October 2014, Hudson-Prentice signed his first professional contract with Sussex, after graduating from the club's academy; he had played for Sussex since the age of 10. After two seasons as a professional, Hudson-Prentice was released by Sussex in November 2016.

Since then Hudson-Prentice has been part of the MCC young cricketers, where he met former Derbyshire Assistant Coach Steve Kirby. He represented Derbyshire on a six-week trial period before signing a three-year contract for them on 12 June 2019. He made his T20 debut on 20 July 2019, for Derbyshire against Yorkshire, in the 2019 t20 Blast. During this campaign he played every match, as Derbyshire went on to reach their first ever T20 Finals Day, losing in the semi-final to eventual winners, Essex.

On 11 July 2021 Hudson-Prentice announced he would sign for Sussex again at the end of the season after a two-year spell at Derbyshire. On 16 August he joined the club on loan for the remainder of the season, playing in three County Championship matches before breaking his hand against Leicestershire. His Sussex return was hit by a further setback a few months later, picking up a stress fracture to the back, ruling him out for the majority of the 2022 campaign.

In July 2026, it was announced that Hudson-Prentice would join Hampshire for the start of the 2027 county season.

He was educated at St Bede's School, Sussex.
