= Luke Charlesworth (cricketer) =

English cricketer (born 2003)

Personal information
- Full name: Luke Alexander Charlesworth
- Born: 4 April 2003 (age 23); Oxford, Oxfordshire, England
- Batting: Right-handed
- Bowling: Right arm medium pace
- Role: Bowler
- Relatives: Ben Charlesworth (brother)

Domestic team information
- Years: Team
- 2023–2026: Gloucestershire (squad no. 19)
- FC debut: 3 September 2023 Gloucestershire v Leicestershire

Career statistics
Competition	FC	LA	T20
Matches	5	5	1
Runs scored	17	9	1
Batting average	5.66	9.00	1.00
100s/50s	0/0	0/0	0/0
Top score	12	4*	1
Balls bowled	407	240	18
Wickets	5	5	1
Bowling average	53.60	51.60	32.00
5 wickets in innings	0	0	0
10 wickets in match	0	0	0
Best bowling	3/54	3/42	1/32
Catches/stumpings	1/–	3/–	0/–
- Source: ESPNcricinfo, 11 August 2026

Luke Alexander Charlesworth (born 4 April 2003) is an English former professional cricketer who played for Gloucestershire County Cricket Club. He is a right handed batsman and a right arm medium pace bowler.

== Early and personal life ==
Charlesworth started playing cricket at Abingdon Vale Cricket Club at the age of six year-old. He played age-group cricket for Oxfordshire and from the age of 11 years-old was regular training with the Gloucestershire Talent Pathway and joined the Gloucestershire Academy at the age of 15 years-old. He attended St Edward's School, Oxford, and later studied at Exeter University, graduating in 2024. His older brother is fellow Gloucestershire first-class cricketer Ben Charlesworth.

== Career ==
He played minor counties cricket for Oxfordshire. He made his second-XI debut for Gloucestershire in 2019 at the age of 16 years-old, taking 2/49 in Bath against Kent second-XI. He was the Gloucestershire Cricket Pathway’s Under-17 Player of the Year that season and later went on to captain the Gloucestershire second-XI. He signed a 3-year rookie contract with Gloucestershire County Cricket Club in March 2022, and made his first-class debut for Gloucestershire in the County Championship on 3 September 2023 against Leicestershire. He took 3 wickets for 54 on debut.

Charlesworth signed a full professional contract with Gloucestershire in 2024, and signed a new contract with the club the following year. During the 2026 season, he took career-best figures in the One Day Cup with 3-42 against Kent. Charlesworth announced his retirement from professional cricket in September 2026 on medical advice following a back injury at the age of 23 years-old having made 11 appearances for Gloucestershire in all formats.
