= Ben Charlesworth =

English cricketer (born 2000)

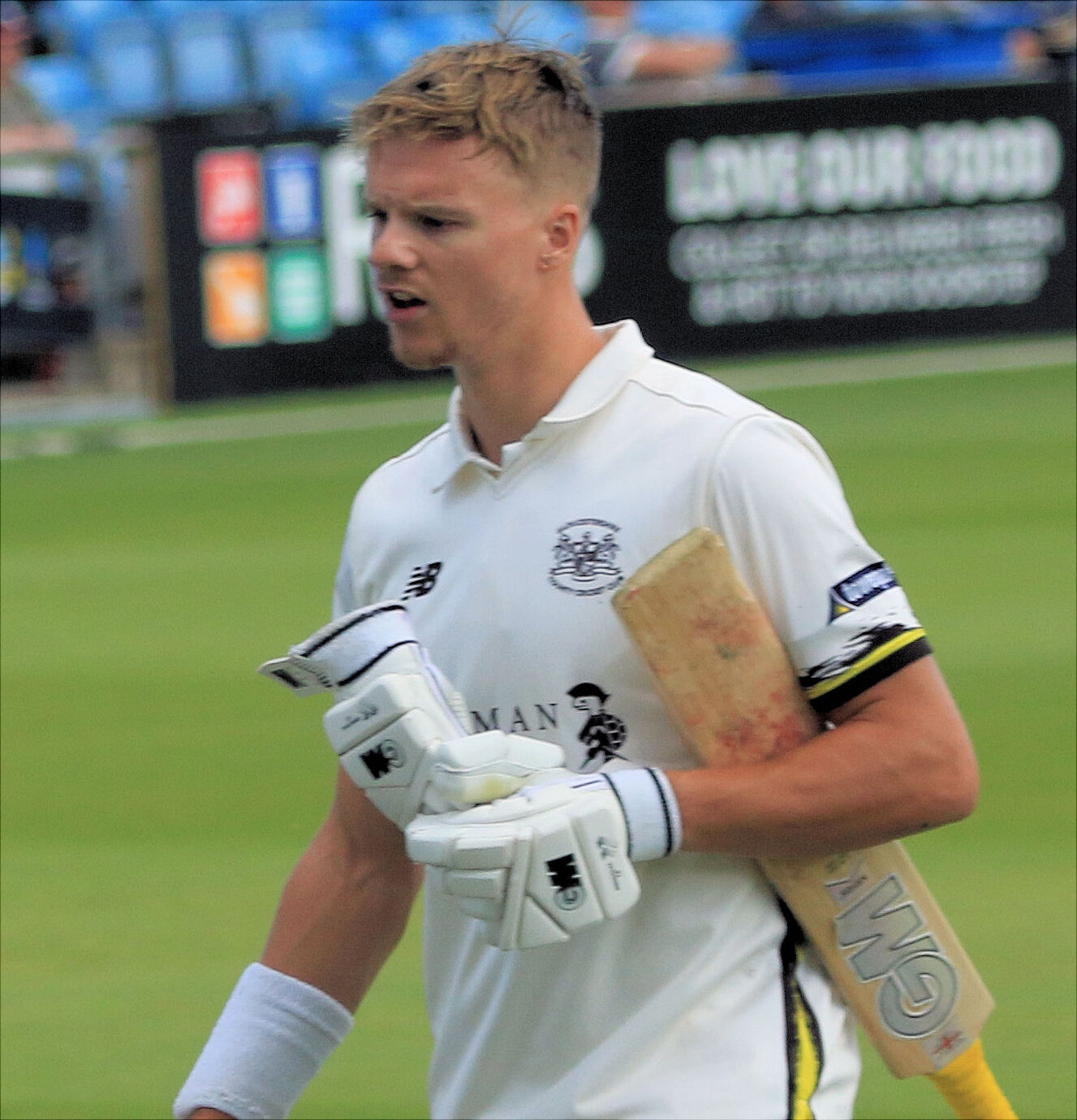
- Charlesworth in 2023

Personal information
- Full name: Ben Geoffrey Charlesworth
- Born: 19 November 2000 (age 25); Oxford, Oxfordshire, England
- Batting: Left-handed
- Bowling: Right-arm medium-fast
- Role: Batsman
- Relatives: Luke Alexander Charlesworth (brother)

Domestic team information
- Years: Team
- 2018–2026: Gloucestershire (squad no. 64)
- 2025: Kathmandu Gorkhas
- FC debut: 19 August 2018 Gloucestershire v Warwickshire
- LA debut: 30 June 2019 Gloucestershire v Australia A

Career statistics
Competition	FC	LA	T20
Matches	63	28	51
Runs scored	2,983	995	994
Batting average	30.13	39.80	26.86
100s/50s	4/16	1/7	0/4
Top score	210	104	68
Balls bowled	1,597	90	141
Wickets	32	1	7
Bowling average	35.06	97.00	33.57
5 wickets in innings	0	0	0
10 wickets in match	0	0	0
Best bowling	3/5	1/23	2/5
Catches/stumpings	33/–	13/–	15/–
- Source: Cricinfo, 15 July 2026

Ben Geoffrey Charlesworth (born 19 November 2000) is an English cricketer. He made his first-class debut for Gloucestershire in the 2018 County Championship on 17 August 2018. He made his List A debut on 30 June 2019, for Gloucestershire against Australia A cricket team. In October 2019, he was named in the England under-19 cricket team's squad for a 50-over tri-series in the Caribbean. In December 2019, he was named in England's squad for the 2020 Under-19 Cricket World Cup. Charlesworth scored a first-class career-best 210 against Leicestershire in August 2024, going on to make a total of 723 County Championship runs for Gloucestershire over the season at an average of 48.20 and was rewarded with a new two-year contract in October that year. In April 2026, it was announced that Charlesworth would leave Gloucestershire at the end of that year's County Championship season. Later that month he signed a three-year contract with Lancashire, starting from the 2027 English county season.
