= Lewis Hill (cricketer, born 1990) =

English cricketer

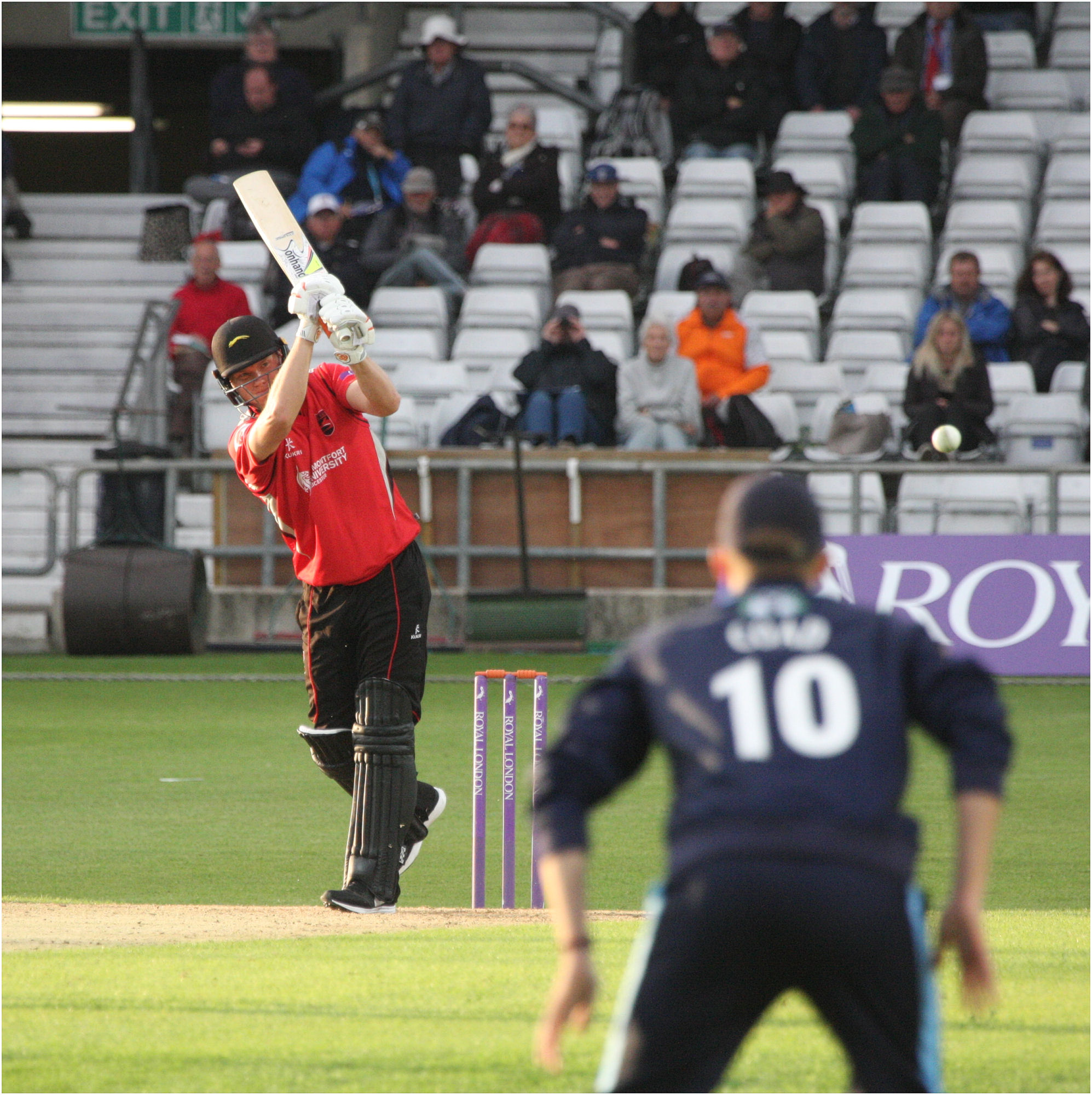
- Hill in 2017

Personal information
- Full name: Lewis John Hill
- Born: 5 October 1990 (age 36); Leicester, Leicestershire, England
- Height: 5 ft 8 in (1.73 m)
- Batting: Right-handed
- Bowling: Right-arm medium
- Role: Batsman, wicket-keeper

Domestic team information
- Years: Team
- 2012–2013: Unicorns
- 2015–2026: Leicestershire (squad no. 23)
- FC debut: 3 May 2015 Leicestershire v Kent
- LA debut: 29 June 2012 Unicorns v Northamptonshire

Career statistics
Competition	FC	LA	T20
Matches	110	84	89
Runs scored	5,428	1,982	1,161
Batting average	32.30	26.07	18.72
100s/50s	10/28	3/10	0/4
Top score	162*	118	59
Catches/stumpings	116/3	34/2	34/3
- Source: CricketArchive, 21 June 2026

Lewis John Hill (born 5 October 1990) is a former English cricketer. Hill was a right-handed batsman and wicketkeeper.

Educated at Hastings High School and John Cleveland College in Hinckley, Hill has played Second XI cricket for Leicestershire since 2009. During the 2012 season, Hill was selected as part of the Unicorns squad for the 2012 Clydesdale Bank 40. He made his List A debut during the competition against Northamptonshire at Sir Paul Getty's Ground, Wormsley. He was dismissed for a golden duck in the match by Lee Daggett, with Northamptonshire winning by 8 wickets. However in his next outing for the Unicorns against Warwickshire he made an impressive 35 before being dismissed by Chris Wright. In May 2015, Hill made his first-class début at Canterbury for Leicestershire vs Kent. He made 57 and 3 respectively. Although not being in the squad for Leicestershire's trip to Surrey, Boyce failed a late fitness test, meaning Lewis Hill was once again selected. He was chosen to open the batting. He made 126 off just 147 balls, hitting 18 fours and 2 sixes in the process.

Having been white-ball captain since 2021, Hill was put in charge of the Leicestershire red-ball team in November 2022, holding both roles until stepping down in September 2024.
