= Ollie Price =

English cricketer (born 2001)

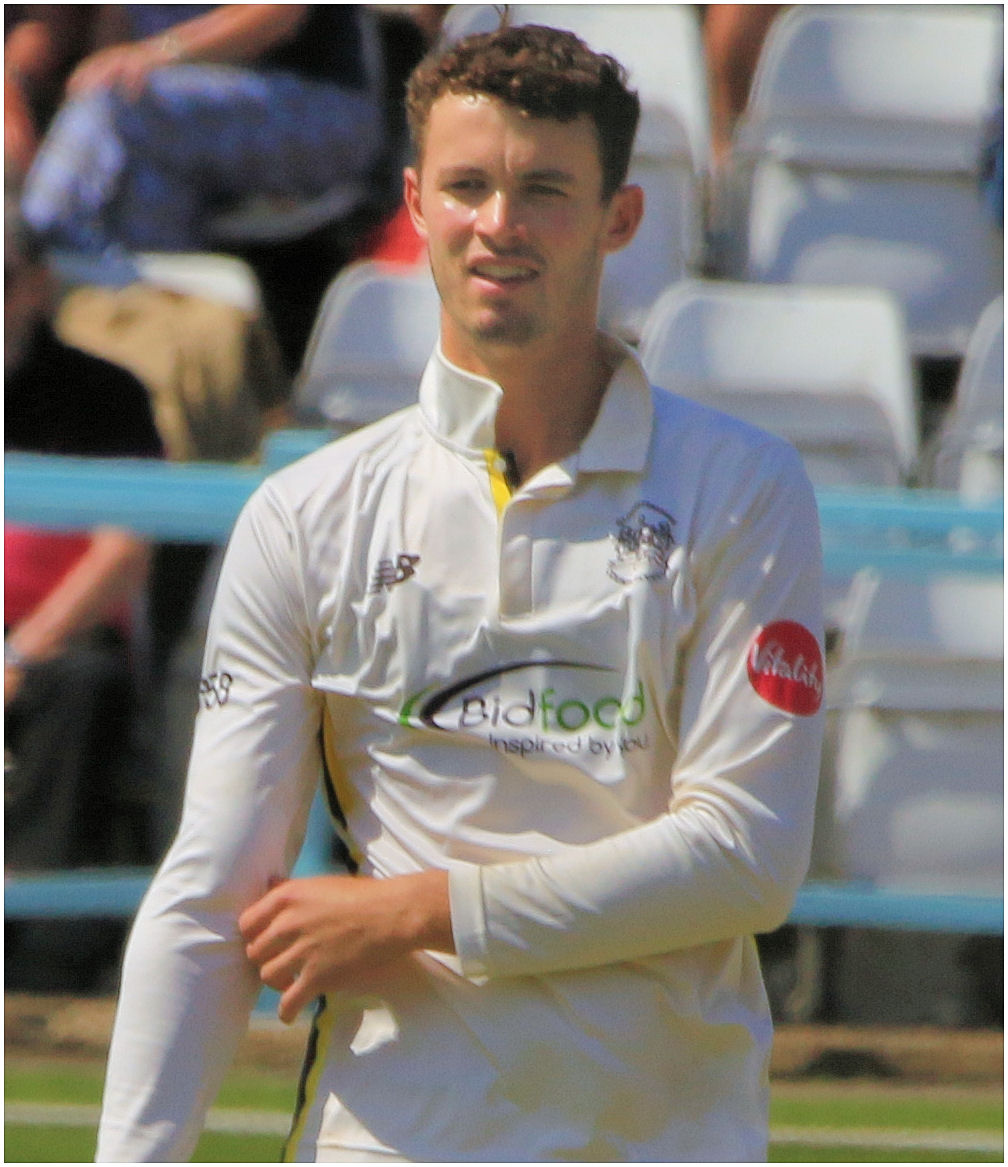
- Price in 2024

Personal information
- Full name: Oliver Joseph Price
- Born: 12 June 2001 (age 25); Oxford, Oxfordshire, England
- Batting: Right-handed
- Bowling: Right-arm off break
- Role: All-rounder
- Relatives: Tom Price (brother)

Domestic team information
- Years: Team
- 2021–present: Gloucestershire (squad no. 67)
- FC debut: 5 July 2021 Gloucestershire v Middlesex
- LA debut: 12 August 2021 Gloucestershire v Kent

Career statistics
Competition	FC	LA	T20
Matches	65	44	45
Runs scored	3,472	1,689	624
Batting average	31.00	43.30	17.82
100s/50s	6/18	4/7	0/1
Top score	253*	122	51
Balls bowled	3,889	1,007	401
Wickets	47	26	29
Bowling average	52.14	38.03	21.03
5 wickets in innings	1	0	0
10 wickets in match	0	0	0
Best bowling	6/45	2/12	3/21
Catches/stumpings	80/–	26/–	30/–
- Source: Cricinfo, 27 September 2026

Oliver Joseph Price (born 12 June 2001) is an English cricketer. He is the younger brother of fellow cricketer Tom Price. He was educated at Magdalen College School in Oxford before attending Durham University. He made his debut aged 17 for Oxfordshire in the minor counties competition. He made his first-class debut on 5 July 2021, for Gloucestershire in the 2021 County Championship. He made his List A debut on 12 August 2021, for Gloucestershire in the 2021 Royal London One-Day Cup. He made his Twenty20 debut on 29 May 2022, for Gloucestershire against the Sri Lanka Cricket Development XI during their tour of England.
