= 2026 T20 Blast =

English T20 Cricket tournament in 2026

- Dates: 22 May – 18 July 2026
- Administrator: England and Wales Cricket Board
- Cricket format: Twenty20
- Tournament format(s): Group stage and knockout
- Host(s): England; Wales
- Champions: Northamptonshire Steelbacks (3rd title)
- Runners-up: Hampshire Hawks
- Participants: 18
- Matches: 115
- Most runs: Joe Weatherley (591) (Hampshire Hawks)
- Most wickets: Hasan Ali (27) (Yorkshire)
- Official website: Vitality Blast

The 2026 T20 Blast (also known as the 2026 Vitality Blast for sponsoring reasons) was the 24th edition of the T20 Blast (currently known as the Vitality Blast), a professional Twenty20 cricket league played in England and Wales. The tournament was played from 22 May to 18 July 2026. The domestic T20 competition was run by the England and Wales Cricket Board (ECB) and branded as the Vitality Blast due to the tournament's sponsorship.

Somerset were the defending champions, having won their third title in 2025. In the final, Northamptonshire Steelbacks defeated Hampshire Hawks by 14 runs to win their third title.

== Format ==
The playing format was changed from this season; with the two groups of nine sides replaced by three groups of six split into north, central, and south groups, as they were in the 2020 edition. Each county played 12 group-stage matches, six at home and six away. Counties played the other five counties in their group home and away, in addition to one home match against a county from outside their group and one away match against another county from outside their group.

For the knockout rounds, the top two teams qualified for the quarter finals in addition to the two best third-placed teams. The winners of each quarter final qualify for Finals Day.

== Group Division ==
The teams were divided into the following groups:

- North Group: Derbyshire Falcons, Durham, Lancashire, Leicestershire Foxes, Notts Outlaws, Yorkshire
- Central & West Group: Glamorgan, Gloucestershire, Northamptonshire Steelbacks, Somerset, Warwickshire Bears, Worcestershire Rapids
- South Group: Essex, Hampshire Hawks, Kent Spitfires, Middlesex, Surrey, Sussex Sharks

== Standings ==
=== North Group ===
Pos	Team	Pld	W	L	T	NR	Pts	NRR	Qualification
1	Notts Outlaws	12	8	4	0	0	32	0.169	Advanced to the quarter-final
2	Yorkshire	12	7	4	1	0	30	0.720	Advanced to the quarter-final
3	Lancashire	12	6	5	1	0	26	−0.335	
4	Durham	12	5	7	0	0	20	0.462	
5	Derbyshire Falcons	12	3	7	2	0	16	0.393	
6	Leicestershire Foxes	12	3	9	0	0	12	−1.600	

Source: CricinfoBBC Sport

=== Central & West Group ===
Pos	Team	Pld	W	L	NR	Pts	NRR	Qualification
1	Northamptonshire Steelbacks	12	9	3	0	36	0.936	Advanced to the quarter-final
2	Somerset	12	7	5	0	28	0.763	Advanced to the quarter-final
3	Gloucestershire	12	7	5	0	28	0.288	Advanced to the quarter-final
4	Warwickshire Bears	12	6	6	0	24	0.367	
5	Glamorgan	12	6	6	0	24	0.217	
6	Worcestershire Rapids	12	6	6	0	24	−0.337	

Source: CricinfoBBC Sport

=== South Group ===
Pos	Team	Pld	W	L	NR	Pts	NRR	Qualification
1	Hampshire Hawks	12	8	4	0	32	0.283	Advanced to the quarter-final
2	Surrey	12	7	5	0	28	0.666	Advanced to the quarter-final
3	Essex	12	7	5	0	28	0.354	Advanced to the quarter-final
4	Kent Spitfires	12	4	8	0	16	−0.895	
5	Middlesex	12	4	8	0	16	−1.243	
6	Sussex Sharks	12	3	9	0	10 (Note: Sussex Sharks were deducted 2 points after agreeing to a financial support package from the England and Wales Cricket Board (ECB).)	−1.168	

Source: CricinfoBBC Sport

== Fixtures ==
=== May ===
22 May 2026
19:00 (D/N)
Scorecard

Essex; 191/5 (20 overs)	v	Sussex Sharks; 192/4 (16 overs)
Paul Walter 58 (37); James Coles 2/32 (3 overs)		John Simpson 63 (23); Charlie Bennett 1/14 (1 over)

Sussex Sharks won by 6 wickets
County Cricket Ground, Chelmsford
Umpires: Hassan Adnan and Ben Debenham

- Sussex Sharks won the toss and elected to field.
- Simon Fernandes (Essex) made his T20 debut.

22 May 2026
18:30 (D/N)
Scorecard

Surrey; 213/6 (20 overs)	v	Lancashire Lightning; 154 (16.1 overs)
Tom Curran 49* (20); James Anderson 1/23 (3 overs)		Paul Coughlin 37 (24); Yousef Majid 3/42 (4 overs)

Surrey won by 59 runs
The Oval, London
Umpires: Martin Saggers and Jack Shantry

- Lancashire Lightning won the toss and elected to field.
- Adam Thomas (Surrey) and Joe Moores (Lancashire Lightning) both made their T20 debuts.

22 May 2026
18:15 (D/N)
Scorecard

Kent Spitfires; 208/6 (20 overs)	v	Middlesex; 181/8 (20 overs)
Sam Billings 84* (37); Noah Cornwell 2/25 (4 overs)		Adam Rossington 79 (43); Tom Rogers 4/39 (4 overs)

Kent Spitfires won by 27 runs
Lord's, London
Umpires: Anthony Harris and Mark Newell

- Kent Spitfires won the toss and elected to bat.
- Caleb Falconer (Middlesex) made his T20 debut.

22 May 2026
18:30 (D/N)
Scorecard

Durham; 203/8 (20 overs)	v	Derbyshire Falcons; 197/8 (20 overs)
Alex Lees 54 (28); Jack Morley 3/35 (4 overs)		Matt Montgomery 74* (45); Callum Parkinson 3/38 (4 overs)

Durham won by 6 runs
County Cricket Ground, Derby
Umpires: Naeem Ashraf and Steve O'Shaughnessy

- Derbyshire Falcons won the toss and elected to field.
- Amrit Basra (Derbyshire Falcons) made his T20 debut.

22 May 2026
18:30 (D/N)
Scorecard

Hampshire Hawks; 158 (19.4 overs)	v	Somerset; 160/3 (16.2 overs)
James Vince 58 (34); Craig Overton 3/27 (4 overs)		Will Smeed 59 (29); Scott Currie 2/27 (4 overs)

Somerset won by 7 wickets
County Ground, Taunton
Umpires: Nigel Long and Tom Lungley
Player of the match: Will Smeed (Somerset)

- Somerset won the toss and elected to field.
- Manny Lumsden (Hampshire Hawks) made his T20 debut.

22 May 2026
18:30 (D/N)
Scorecard

Northamptonshire Steelbacks; 165/8 (20 overs)	v	Glamorgan; 162/8 (20 overs)
Justin Broad 38 (25); Fazalhaq Farooqi 4/34 (4 overs)		Dan Douthwaite 51* (34); George Scrimshaw 3/33 (4 overs)

Northamptonshire Steelbacks won by 3 runs
County Cricket Ground, Northampton
Umpires: Russell Warren and Chris Watts

- Glamorgan won the toss and elected to field.

22 May 2026
19:00 (D/N)
Scorecard

Gloucestershire; 121 (16.1 overs)	v	Warwickshire Bears; 74 (14.4 overs)
Ben Charlesworth 25 (21); Tazeem Ali 4/25 (4 overs)		Vansh Jani 21 (18); Duan Jansen 4/25 (4 overs)

Gloucestershire won by 47 runs
County Ground, Bristol
Umpires: Ben Peverall and Paul Pollard

- Warwickshire Bears won the toss and elected to field.
- Kamran Dhariwal (Gloucestershire), Tazeem Ali and Vansh Jani (Warwickshire Bears) made their T20 debuts.

22 May 2026
18:30 (D/N)
Scorecard

Notts Outlaws; 167/7 (20 overs)	v	Yorkshire; 169/3 (16.3 overs)
Benny Howell 30 (13); Jafer Chohan 2/26 (4 overs)		Jonny Bairstow 83* (47); Dillon Pennington 2/46 (4 overs)

Yorkshire won by 7 wickets
Trent Bridge, Nottingham
Umpires: Michael Gough and Simon Widdup

- Yorkshire won the toss and elected to field.
- Joe Pocklington (Notts Outlaws) made his T20 debut.

22 May 2026
18:30 (D/N)
Scorecard

Worcestershire Rapids; 188/9 (20 overs)	v	Leicestershire Foxes; 170/4 (20 overs)
Isaac Mohammed 42 (26); Josh Davey 3/32 (4 overs)		Nick Kelly 61* (42); Adam Finch 2/32 (4 overs)

Worcestershire Rapids won by 18 runs
Grace Road, Leicester
Umpires: Richard Illingworth and Neil Pratt

- Leicestershire Foxes won the toss and elected to field.

23 May 2026
19:00 (D/N)
Scorecard

Glamorgan; 157/8 (20 overs)	v	Gloucestershire; 158/8 (20 overs)
Henry Hurle 46 (31); Duan Jansen 3/27 (4 overs)		Miles Hammond 56 (31); Mason Crane 2/16 (4 overs)

Gloucestershire won by 2 wickets
Sophia Gardens, Cardiff
Umpires: Tom Lungley and Paul Pollard
Player of the match: Miles Hammond (Gloucestershire)

- Gloucestershire won the toss and elected to field.
- Henry Hurle (Glamorgan) made his T20 debut.

24 May 2026
15:30
Scorecard

Leicestershire Foxes; 148/8 (20 overs)	v	Durham; 150/4 (14 overs)
Sol Budinger 40 (34); Matthew Potts 3/28 (4 overs)		Graham Clark 62 (26); Ben Mike 2/16 (2 overs)

Durham won by 6 wickets
Riverside Ground, Chester-le-Street
Umpires: Michael Gough and Steve O'Shaughnessy

- Leicestershire Foxes won the toss and elected to bat.

24 May 2026
15:30
Scorecard

Warwickshire Bears; 189/6 (20 overs)	v	Somerset; 193/3 (18.2 overs)
Sam Hain 52 (35); Craig Overton 2/40 (4 overs); Jake Ball 2/40 (4 overs)		James Rew 93 (48); Oliver Hannon-Dalby 1/31 (3.2 overs)

Somerset won by 7 wickets
Edgbaston, Birmingham
Umpires: Hassan Adnan and Martin Saggers

- Warwickshire Bears won the toss and elected to bat.

24 May 2026
15:30
Scorecard

Derbyshire Falcons; 194/4 (20 overs)	v	Yorkshire; 195/8 (19.2 overs)
Martin Andersson 81* (56); Matt Revis 1/29 (3 overs)		Moeen Ali 51 (35); Jack Morley 4/44 (4 overs)

Yorkshire won by 2 wickets
Headingley, Leeds
Umpires: Neil Pratt and Simon Widdup

- Derbyshire Falcons won the toss and elected to bat.

24 May 2026
12:00
Scorecard

Middlesex; 143/8 (20 overs)	v	Surrey; 144/4 (18.3 overs)
Luke Hollman 35* (28); Yousef Majid 2/25 (4 overs)		Sam Curran 71* (47); Tom Helm 2/24 (3.3 overs)

Surrey won by 6 wickets
Lord's, London
Umpires: Ben Debenham and Russell Warren
Player of the match: Sam Curran (Surrey)

- Middlesex won the toss and elected to bat.

24 May 2026
14:30
Scorecard

Northamptonshire Steelbacks; 191 (20 overs)	v	Worcestershire Rapids; 91 (14.4 overs)
David Willey 46 (23); Adam Finch 3/36 (4 overs)		Kashif Ali 38 (28); Calvin Harrison 4/17 (3.4 overs)

Northamptonshire Steelbacks won by 100 runs
New Road, Worcester
Umpires: Anthony Harris and Surendiran Shanmugam

- Northamptonshire Steelbacks won the toss and elected to bat.

25 May 2026
16:00
Scorecard

Lancashire Lightning; 208/4 (20 overs)	v	Notts Outlaws; 169/9 (20 overs)
Ben McDermott 63* (27); Mohammad Ali 2/37 (4 overs)		Dillon Pennington 37* (18); Tom Hartley 4/20 (3.5 overs)

Lancashire Lightning won by 39 runs
Old Trafford, Manchester
Umpires: Richard Illingworth and Tom Lungley

- Lancashire Lightning won the toss and elected to bat.
- Harry Singh (Lancashire Lightning) made his T20 debut.

25 May 2026
15:30
Scorecard

Sussex Sharks; 197/6 (20 overs)	v	Kent Spitfires; 199/3 (18.2 overs)
Tom Clark 79 (29); Dian Forrester 3/25 (4 overs)		Zak Crawley 75* (41); Fynn Hudson-Prentice 1/21 (2 overs)

Kent Spitfires won by 7 wickets
St Lawrence Ground, Canterbury
Umpires: Mark Newell and Ben Peverall

- Sussex Sharks won the toss and elected to bat.
- Bertie Foreman (Kent Spitfires) made his T20 debut.

26 May 2026
19:00 (D/N)
Scorecard

Hampshire Hawks; 200/4 (20 overs)	v	Essex; 170/7 (20 overs)
Tristan Stubbs 69* (42); Charlie Bennett 2/44 (4 overs)		Luc Benkenstein 48 (31); Scott Currie 4/18 (4 overs)

Hampshire Hawks won by 30 runs
Rose Bowl, Southampton
Umpires: Martin Saggers and Surendiran Shanmugam
Player of the match: Tristan Stubbs (Hampshire Hawks)

- Essex won the toss and elected to field.
- Andrew Neal (Hampshire Hawks) made his T20 debut.

27 May 2026
19:00 (D/N)
Scorecard

Derbyshire Falcons; 230/5 (20 overs)	v	Leicestershire Foxes; 145 (15.2 overs)
Caleb Jewell 58* (35); Ian Holland 2/35 (4 overs)		Ashton Turner 53 (22); Martin Andersson 6/23 (4 overs)

Derbyshire won by 85 runs
Grace Road, Leicester
Umpires: Nigel Llong and Tom Lungley
Player of the match: Martin Andersson (Derbyshire)

- Leicestershire Foxes won the toss and elected to field.
- Alex Green (Leicestershire Foxes) made his T20 debut.

29 May 2026
18:30 (D/N)
Scorecard

Yorkshire; 151/9 (20 overs)	v	Durham; 93 (16.2 overs)
James Wharton 64 (41); Matthew Potts 3/20 (4 overs)		David Bedingham 41 (29); Hasan Ali 2/11 (2 overs)

Yorkshire won by 58 runs
County Cricket Ground, Derby
Umpires: Paul Baldwin and Neil Pratt

- Durham won the toss and elected to field.

29 May 2026
18:30 (D/N)
Scorecard

Lancashire Lightning; 145/9 (20 overs)	v	Leicestershire Foxes; 146/8 (19.5 overs)
Joe Moores 55 (39); Liam Trevaskis 2/20 (4 overs)		Rishi Patel 40 (27); Saqib Mahmood 3/22 (4 overs)

Leicestershire Foxes won by 2 wickets
Old Trafford, Manchester
Umpires: Naeem Ashraf and Paul Pollard

- Lancashire Lightning won the toss and elected to bat.

29 May 2026
18:30 (D/N)
Scorecard

Somerset; 171/9 (20 overs)	v	Glamorgan; 175/3 (13.5 overs)
Tom Banton 59 (25); Nathan McAndrew 4/15 (4 overs)		Kiran Carlson 109 (45); Josh Thomas 1/14 (1 over)

Glamorgan won by 7 wickets
Sophia Gardens, Cardiff
Umpires: Anthony Harris and Surendiran Shanmugam

- Glamorgan won the toss and elected to field.

29 May 2026
18:30 (D/N)
Scorecard

Derbyshire Falcons; 234/4 (20 overs)	v	Notts Outlaws; 211/6 (20 overs)
Aneurin Donald 84 (31); George Linde 2/52 (4 overs)		Tom Moores 75* (34); Ben Aitchison 2/44 (4 overs)

Derbyshire Falcons won by 23 runs
County Cricket Ground, Derby
Umpires: Hassan Adnan and Simon Widdup

- Derbyshire Falcons won the toss and elected to bat.

29 May 2026
18:30 (D/N)
Scorecard

Gloucestershire; 164/9 (20 overs)	v	Northamptonshire Steelbacks; 166/3 (16.2 overs)
Ben Charlesworth 49 (33); James Sales 5/21 (4 overs)		Chris Lynn 69 (36); Oliver Price 2/38 (3 overs)

Northamptonshire Steelbacks won by 7 wickets
County Cricket Ground, Northampton
Umpires: Ben Debenham and Richard Illingworth

- Northamptonshire Steelbacks won the toss and elected to field.

29 May 2026
18:30 (D/N)
Scorecard

Kent Spitfires; 129/9 (20 overs)	v	Essex; 130/1 (13.4 overs)
Dian Forrester 34 (34); Charlie Bennett 3/25 (3 overs)		Michael Pepper 64 (40); Tom Rogers 1/31 (3 overs)

Essex won by 9 wickets
St Lawrence Ground, Canterbury
Umpires: Nigel Llong and Chris Watts

- Essex won the toss and elected to field.

29 May 2026
19:00 (D/N)
Scorecard

Surrey; 174/8 (20 overs)	v	Hampshire Hawks; 178/5 (19.1 overs)
Sam Curran 38 (29); Scott Currie 2/24 (4 overs)		Liam Dawson 76* (44); Tom Curran 3/34 (4 overs)

Hampshire Hawks won by 5 wickets
Rose Bowl, Southampton
Umpires: Mike Burns and James Tredwell

- Surrey won the toss and elected to bat.

29 May 2026
17:30 (D/N)
Scorecard

Warwickshire Bears; 141 (19.5 overs)	v	Worcestershire Rapids; 142/4 (18.5 overs)
Rob Yates 45 (31); Usama Mir 3/27 (4 overs)		Kashif Ali 36 (30); Chris Woakes 1/21 (4 overs)

Worcestershire Rapids won by 6 wickets
New Road, Worcester
Umpires: Steve O'Shaughnessy and Tom Lungley
Player of the match: Tom Taylor (Worcestershire Rapids)

- Worcestershire Rapids won the toss and elected to field.

30 May 2026
19:00 (D/N)
Scorecard

Middlesex; 213/4 (20 overs)	v	Sussex Sharks; 182 (19.4 overs)
Josh de Caires 80* (44); Tymal Mills 3/31 (4 overs)		Tom Alsop 43 (24); Tom Helm 3/41 (4 overs)

Middlesex won by 31 runs
County Cricket Ground, Hove
Umpires: Ben Debenham and Nigel Llong
Player of the match: Josh de Caires (Middlesex)

- Sussex Sharks won the toss and elected to field.

31 May 2026
16:00
Scorecard

Derbyshire Falcons; 173 (20 overs)	v	Essex; 179/5 (19.4 overs)
Matt Montgomery 50 (30); Zaman Akhter 2/13 (2 overs)		Charlie Allison 67* (49); Nick Potts 1/23 (3.4 overs)

Essex won by 5 wickets
County Cricket Ground, Chelmsford
Umpires: Mark Newell and James Tredwell

- Derbyshire Falcons won the toss and elected to bat.

31 May 2026
14:30
Scorecard

Warwickshire Bears; 208/7 (20 overs)	v	Northamptonshire Steelbacks; 209/4 (19.2 overs)
Beau Webster 97 (56); James Sales 2/63 (4 overs)		Chris Lynn 115* (59); Jordan Thompson 2/39 (4 overs)

Northamptonshire Steelbacks won by 6 wickets
Edgbaston, Birmingham
Umpires: Paul Baldwin and Neil Pratt
Player of the match: Chris Lynn (Northamptonshire Steelbacks)

- Warwickshire Bears won the toss and elected to bat.
- Zen Malik (Warwickshire Bears) made his T20 debut.

31 May 2026
14:30
Scorecard

Gloucestershire; 217/6 (20 overs)	v	Yorkshire; 161 (17.4 overs)
D'Arcy Short 82 (50); Hasan Ali 3/29 (4 overs)		Adam Lyth 97 (56); D'Arcy Short 4/31 (4 overs)

Gloucestershire won by 56 runs
Headingley, Leeds
Umpires: Steve O'Shaughnessy and Paul Pollard

- Gloucestershire won the toss and elected to bat.
- Joe Phillips (Gloucestershire) made his T20 debut.

31 May 2026
16:30
Scorecard

Surrey; 116 (19.5 overs)	v	Kent Spitfires; 118/2 (14 overs)
Tom Curran 32 (21); Jake Lintott 3/19 (4 overs)		Harry Finch 64* (42); Reece Topley 1/18 (3 overs)

Kent won by 8 wickets
The Oval, London
Umpires: Mike Burns and Surendiran Shanmugam

- Kent won the toss and elected to field.

31 May 2026
14:30
Scorecard

Middlesex; 126/7 (20 overs)	v	Hampshire Hawks; 130/2 (14 overs)
Luke Hollman 47* (33); Chris Wood 2/20 (4 overs)		James Vince 45 (29); Eathan Bosch 1/15 (3 overs)

Hampshire Hawks won by 8 wickets
Merchant Taylors' School Ground, Northwood
Umpires: Hasan Adnan and Chris Watts

- Hampshire Hawks won the toss and elected to field.

31 May 2026
15:00
Scorecard

Durham; 156/8 (20 overs)	v	Notts Outlaws; 157/4 (17.2 overs)
Will Rhodes 38 (32); George Linde 2/19 (3 overs)		George Munsey 88* (52); Matthew Potts 2/39 (4 overs)

Notts Outlaws won by 6 wickets
Trent Bridge, Nottingham
Umpires: Anthony Harris and Tom Lungley

- Notts Outlaws won the toss and elected to field.

=== June ===
2 June 2026
19:00 (D/N)
Scorecard

Hampshire Hawks; 173/6 (20 overs)	v	Sussex Sharks; 144 (17.3 overs)
Liam Dawson 52 (35); Tymal Mills 2/26 (4 overs)		Harrison Ward 40 (21); Liam Dawson 3/20 (4 overs)

Hampshire Hawks won by 29 runs
Rose Bowl, Southampton
Umpires: Ben Debenham and Ben Peverall

- Sussex Sharks won the toss and elected to field.

3 June 2026
18:30 (D/N)
Scorecard

Middlesex; 130/7 (20 overs)	v	Surrey; 134/2 (14.1 overs)
Luke Hollman 31* (29); Sean Abbott 2/16 (4 overs)		Ollie Pope 51* (33); Tom Helm 1/25 (4 overs)

Surrey won by 8 wickets
The Oval, London
Umpires: Mark Newell and Rob White
Player of the match: Ollie Pope (Surrey)

- Surrey won the toss and elected to field.

4 June 2026
19:00 (D/N)
Scorecard

Somerset; 202/6 (20 overs)	v	Glamorgan; 203/6 (20 overs)
Lewis Gregory 54 (28); Dan Douthwaite 2/35 (4 overs)		Sean Dickson 63 (36); Jake Ball 2/47 (4 overs)

Glamorgan won by 4 wickets
County Ground, Taunton
Umpires: Ian Blackwell and Jack Shantry
Player of the match: Sean Dickson (Glamorgan)

- Glamorgan won the toss and elected to field.

5 June 2026
19:00 (D/N)
Scorecard

Yorkshire; 213/7 (20 overs)	v	Lancashire Lightning; 107 (14.3 overs)
Jonny Bairstow 73 (44); Tom Aspinwall 3/32 (3 overs)		Liam Livingstone 44 (30); Jafer Chohan 4/17 (2.3 overs)

Yorkshire won by 106 runs
Headingley, Leeds
Umpires: Ben Debenham and James Middlebrook
Player of the match: Jonny Bairstow (Yorkshire)

- Lancashire Lightning won the toss and elected to field.

5 June 2026
18:30 (D/N)
Scorecard

Hampshire Hawks; 215/5 (20 overs)	v	Surrey; 210/7 (20 overs)
Joe Weatherley 43 (26); Will Jacks 2/29 (4 overs); Reece Topley 2/29 (4 overs)		Dan Lawrence 94* (47); Chris Wood 3/32 (4 overs)

Hampshire won by 5 runs
The Oval, London
Umpires: Nigel Llong and Paul Baldwin

- Surrey won the toss and elected to field.

5 June 2026
19:00 (D/N)
Scorecard

Sussex Sharks; 179 (19.5 overs)	v	Leicestershire Foxes; 180/6 (17.4 overs)
Harrison Ward 69 (33); Ashton Turner 2/24 (4 overs)		Ashton Turner 57* (28); Sean Hunt 2/37 (4 overs)

Leicestershire Foxes won by 4 wickets
County Cricket Ground, Hove
Umpires: Mark Newell and James Tredwell

- Sussex Sharks won the toss and elected to bat.
- Sean Hunt (Sussex Sharks) made his T20 debut.

5 June 2026
19:00 (D/N)
Scorecard

Somerset; 137/8 (20 overs)	v	Gloucestershire; 138/3 (14.1 overs)
Lewis Gregory 33 (28); Matthew Taylor 2/20 (3 overs)		D'Arcy Short 63 (34); Daniel Sams 2/21 (3 overs)

Gloucestershire won by 7 wickets
County Ground, Bristol
Umpires: Anthony Harris and Rob White

- Gloucestershire won the toss and elected to field.

5 June 2026
18:30 (D/N)
Scorecard

Warwickshire Bears; 139 (19.3 overs)	v	Notts Outlaws; 143/7 (19.5 overs)
Kai Smith 34 (28); Mohammad Ali 3/27 (4 overs)		Jack Haynes 36 (17); Rob Yates 4/22 (4 overs)

Notts Outlaws won by 3 wickets
Trent Bridge, Nottingham
Umpires: David Millns and Paul Pollard

- Notts Outlaws won the toss and elected to field.

5 June 2026
17:30 (D/N)
Scorecard

Worcestershire Rapids; 168/8 (20 overs)	v	Glamorgan; 141 (19.3 overs)
Adam Hose 50 (31); Andy Gorvin 3/34 (4 overs)		Kiran Carlson 35 (24); Sikandar Raza 4/17 (4 overs)

Worcestershire Rapids won by 27 runs
New Road, Worcester
Umpires: Ian Blackwell and Surendiran Shanmugam

- Glamorgan won the toss and elected to field.

6 June 2026
19:00 (D/N)
Scorecard

Northamptonshire Steelbacks; 145/9 (20 overs)	v	Durham; 138/8 (20 overs)
Justin Broad 36 (32); Callum Parkinson 3/19 (4 overs)		Ben McKinney 33 (19); James Sales 2/10 (2 overs)

Northamptonshire Steelbacks won by 7 runs
Riverside Ground, Chester-le-Street
Umpires: Ben Debenham and Steve O'Shaughnessy
Player of the match: Ben Sanderson (Northamptonshire Steelbacks)

- Durham won the toss and elected to field.
- James Minto (Durham) made his T20 debut.

7 June 2026
14:30
Scorecard

Lancashire Lightning; 201/7 (20 overs)	v	Glamorgan; 202/8 (20 overs)
Liam Livingstone 81 (37); James Neesham 3/24 (4 overs)		Chris Cooke 44* (15); Liam Livingstone 3/13 (4 overs)

Glamorgan won by 2 wickets
Stanley Park, Blackpool
Umpires: Hassan Adnan and Steve O'Shaughnessy

- Glamorgan won the toss and elected to field.

7 June 2026
15:30
Scorecard

Essex; 176/5 (20 overs)	v	Middlesex; 116 (17.5 overs)
Luc Benkenstein 67 (56); Sebastian Morgan 2/34 (4 overs)		Ryan Higgins 36 (28); Noah Thain 3/11 (2 overs)

Essex won by 60 runs
Merchant Taylors' School Ground, Northwood
Umpires: Surendiran Shanmugam and James Tredwell

- Middlesex won the toss and elected to field.

7 June 2026
14:30
Scorecard

Kent Spitfires; 133/8 (20 overs)	v	Sussex Sharks; 135/3 (17.2 overs)
Joe Denly 42 (34); Sean Hunt 3/9 (4 overs)		Daniel Hughes 41* (37); Keith Dudgeon 2/24 (4 overs)

Sussex Sharks won by 7 wickets
County Cricket Ground, Hove
Umpires: Nigel Llong and Mark Newell

- Sussex Sharks won the toss and elected to field.

7 June 2026
15:30
Scorecard

Somerset; 215/4 (20 overs)	v	Warwickshire Bears; 216/4 (19.4 overs)
Jordan Hermann 90* (48); Jordan Thompson 2/32 (3 overs)		Beau Webster 112 (61); Alfie Ogborne 1/37 (4 overs)

Warwickshire Bears won by 6 wickets
County Ground, Taunton
Umpires: Ben Peverall and Rob White

- Warwickshire Bears won the toss and elected to field.
- Alfie Ogborne (Somerset) made his T20 debut.

7 June 2026
14:30
Scorecard

Gloucestershire; 148/8 (20 overs)	v	Worcestershire Rapids; 145 (20 overs)
Ben Charlesworth 49 (34); Tom Taylor 2/20 (3 overs)		Sikandar Raza 47 (31); Duan Jansen 4/37 (4 overs)

Gloucestershire won by 3 runs
County Ground, Bristol
Umpires: Ian Blackwell and Jack Shantry

- Gloucestershire won the toss and elected to bat.

7 June 2026
15:00
Scorecard

Notts Outlaws; 183/6 (20 overs)	v	Derbyshire Falcons; 173/9 (20 overs)
George Munsey 53 (32); Akif Javed 2/31 (4 overs)		Wayne Madsen 27 (22); Mohammad Ali 3/25 (4 overs)

Notts Outlaws won by 10 runs
Trent Bridge, Nottingham
Umpires: Naeem Ashraf and Russell Warren

- Derbyshire Falcons won the toss and elected to field.

7 June 2026
14:30
Scorecard

Leicestershire Foxes; 147/8 (20 overs)	v	Yorkshire; 135 (19.5 overs)
Nick Kelly 44 (31); Hasan Ali 4/18 (4 overs)		Jonny Bairstow 39 (21); Rehan Ahmed 3/28 (4 overs)

Leicestershire Foxes won by 12 runs
Grace Road, Leicester
Umpires: Paul Baldwin and Simon Widdup

- Yorkshire won the toss and elected to field.

9 June 2026
19:00 (D/N)
Scorecard

Essex; 187/6 (20 overs)	v	Kent Spitfires; 184/9 (20 overs)
Charlie Allison 74 (47); Matt Milnes 3/23 (4 overs)		Sam Billings 62 (38); Zaman Akhter 3/19 (4 overs)

Essex won by 3 runs.
County Cricket Ground, Chelmsford
Umpires: Mark Newell and Martin Saggers

- Kent Spitfires won the toss and elected to field.

9 June 2026
18:30 (D/N)
Scorecard

Durham; 128/2 (10 overs)	v	Lancashire Lightning; 130/3 (9.1 overs)
Graham Clark 49* (29); Liam Livingstone 1/19 (2 overs)		Liam Livingstone 85* (31); Kasey Aldridge 1/36 (2 overs)

Lancashire Lightning won by 7 wickets
Riverside Ground, Chester-le-Street
Umpires: Hassan Adnan and Michael Gough

- Durham won the toss and elected to bat.

9 June 2026
18:30 (D/N)
Scorecard

Worcestershire Rapids; 154/5 (18 overs)	v	Northamptonshire Steelbacks; 162/4 (16 overs)
Gareth Roderick 47 (32); James Sales 3/34 (4 overs)		David Willey 47 (33); Adam Finch 2/35 (3 overs)

Northants Steelbacks won by 6 wickets (DLS method)
County Cricket Ground, Northampton
Umpires: Chris Watts and Surendiran Shanmugam

- Northants Steelbacks won the toss and elected to field.

26 June 2026
19:00 (D/N)
Scorecard

Warwickshire Bears; 224 (20 overs)	v	Worcestershire Rapids; 165/7 (20 overs)
Zen Malik 99 (46); Tom Taylor 2/28 (3 overs)		Adam Hose 49 (35); Richard Gleeson 2/42 (4 overs)

Warwickshire Bears won by 59 runs
Edgbaston, Birmingham
Umpires: Richard Kettleborough and Graham Lloyd

- Warwickshire Bears won the toss and elected to field.

26 June 2026
18:30 (D/N)
Scorecard

Middlesex; 153/7 (20 overs)	v	Glamorgan; 159/4 (17.3 overs)
Ben Geddes 38 (22); Mason Crane 4/24 (4 overs)		Sean Dickson 67* (34); Naavya Sharma 1/17 (2 overs)

Glamorgan won by 6 wickets
Sophia Gardens, Cardiff
Umpires: Nigel Llong and Russell Warren

- Glamorgan won the toss and elected to field.

26 June 2026
19:00 (D/N)
Scorecard

Sussex Sharks; 171 (19.3 overs)	v	Surrey; 175/3 (15.3 overs)
Harrison Ward 49 (29); Reece Topley 3/16 (2.3 overs)		Will Jacks 70* (39); James Coles 2/35 (4 overs)

Surrey won by 7 wickets
County Cricket Ground, Hove
Umpires: Ian Blackwell and Chris Watts

- Sussex Sharks won the toss and elected to bat.

26 June 2026
18:30 (D/N)
Scorecard

Somerset; 194/7 (20 overs)	v	Gloucestershire; 176/7 (20 overs)
James Rew 116* (56); D'Arcy Short 3/24 (4 overs)		D'Arcy Short 59 (34); Riley Meredith 3/30 (4 overs)

Somerset won by 18 runs
County Ground, Taunton
Umpires: Mike Burns and Ben Peverall

- Gloucestershire won the toss and elected to bat.
- Daaryoush Ahmed (Gloucestershire) made his T20 debut.

26 June 2026
18:30 (D/N)
Scorecard

Northamptonshire Steelbacks; 238/6 (20 overs)	v	Essex; 108 (13.2 overs)
Chris Lynn 75 (37); Simon Harmer 2/39 (4 overs)		Michael Pepper 23 (11); Calvin Harrison 5/9 (2.2 overs)

Northamptonshire Steelbacks won by 130 runs
County Cricket Ground, Northampton
Umpires: Naeem Ashraf and James Middlebrook

- Essex won the toss and elected to field.

26 June 2026
19:00 (D/N)
Scorecard

Kent Spitfires; 184/7 (20 overs)	v	Notts Outlaws; 187/6 (18.4 overs)
Sam Billings 64 (38); Mohammad Amir 2/26 (4 overs)		George Munsey 82* (47); Matt Milnes 3/30 (3.4 overs)

Notts Outlaws won by 4 wickets
St Lawrence Ground, Canterbury
Umpires: Jack Shantry and Rob White
Player of the match: George Munsey (Notts Outlaws)

- Notts Outlaws won the toss and elected to field.

26 June 2026
18:30 (D/N)
Scorecard

Leicestershire Foxes; 156/7 (20 overs)	v	Lancashire Lightning; 160/5 (18.5 overs)
Nick Kelly 49* (44); Liam Livingstone 2/34 (4 overs)		Liam Livingstone 74 (43); Ashton Turner 1/14 (3 overs)

Lancashire Lightning won by 5 wickets
Grace Road, Leicester
Umpires: Richard Illingworth and Neil Pratt

- Lancashire Lightning won the toss and elected to field.

26 June 2026
19:00 (D/N)
Scorecard

Hampshire Hawks; 150 (19.5 overs)	v	Yorkshire; 155/8 (19.5 overs)
Andrew Tye 44 (17); Chris Wood 3/23 (4 overs)		Joe Weatherley 63 (33); Dan Moriarty 3/27 (4 overs)

Hampshire Hawks won by 2 wickets
Rose Bowl, Southampton
Umpires: Ben Debenham and James Tredwell

- Yorkshire won the toss and elected to field.

28 June 2026
14:30
Scorecard

Yorkshire; 215/9 (20 overs)	v	Derbyshire Falcons; 215/8 (20 overs)
Wayne Madsen 62 (33); Andrew Tye 3/36 (4 overs)		Matthew Revis 69* (32); Ben Aitchison 3/46 (4 overs)

Match tied
Queen's Park, Chesterfield
Umpires: Graham Lloyd and Steve O'Shaughnessy

- Yorkshire won the toss and elected to bat.
- Yousaf Bin Naeem (Derbyshire Falcons) made his T20 debut.

28 June 2026
14:30
Scorecard

Durham; 218/6 (20 overs)	v	Middlesex; 118 (14.5 overs)
Alex Lees 108 (64); Tom Helm 2/43 (4 overs)		Leus du Plooy 34 (21); Ben Raine 3/17 (2.5 overs)

Durham won by 100 runs
Old Deer Park, Richmond
Umpires: Richard Illingworth and James Tredwell

- Middlesex won the toss and elected to field.

28 June 2026
15:30
Scorecard

Hampshire Hawks; 176/6 (20 overs)	v	Kent Spitfires; 177/3 (18.4 overs)
James Vince 84 (46); Grant Stewart 4/32 (4 overs)		Daniel Bell-Drummond 54 (34); Chris Wood 2/33 (4 overs)

Kent Spitfires won by 7 wickets
St Lawrence Ground, Canterbury
Umpires: Anthony Harris and Chris Watts

- Kent Spitfires won the toss and elected to field.

28 June 2026
14:30
Scorecard

Notts Outlaws; 209/4 (20 overs)	v	Leicestershire Foxes; 135 (17.5 overs)
George Munsey 75* (52); Alex Green 2/27 (4 overs)		Rehan Ahmed 45 (23); Mohammad Ali 3/20 (3.5 overs)

Notts Outlaws won by 74 runs
Grace Road, Leicester
Umpires: Paul Pollard and Russell Warren

- Leicestershire Foxes won the toss and elected to field.

28 June 2026
14:30
Scorecard

Worcestershire Rapids; 180/5 (20 overs)	v	Somerset; 144/9 (20 overs)
Sikandar Raza 42 (22); Daniel Sams 2/29 (4 overs)		James Rew 36 (28); Matthew Waite 3/23 (4 overs)

Worcestershire Rapids won by 36 runs
New Road, Worcester
Umpires: Michael Gough and Jack Shantry

- Somerset won the toss and elected to field.

=== July ===
1 July 2026
19:00 (N)
Scorecard

Surrey; 240/4 (20 overs)	v	Essex; 233/8 (20 overs)
Jason Roy 65 (38); Matt Critchley 2/36 (4 overs)		Paul Walter 78 (30 overs); Reece Topley 3/28 (4 overs); Dan Lawrence 3/28 (4 overs)

Surrey won by 7 runs
County Cricket Ground, Hove
Umpires: Tom Lungley and James Tredwell

- Essex won the toss and elected to field.

1 July 2026
19:00 (N)
Scorecard

Warwickshire Bears; 198/3 (20 overs)	v	Sussex Sharks; 122 (16.3 overs)
Sam Hain 68* (38); Danny Briggs 2/36 (4 overs)		Daniel Hughes 38 (31); Richard Gleeson 4/19 (3 overs)

Warwickshire Bears won by 76 runs
County Cricket Ground, Chelmsford
Umpires: Anthony Harris and Richard Illingworth

- Warwickshire Bears won the toss and elected to bat.

1 July 2026
18:30 (D/N)
Scorecard

Lancashire Lightning; 205 (20 overs)	v	Derbyshire Falcons; 201 (20 overs)
Ben McDermott 68 (40); Akif Javed 4/36 (4 overs)		Aneurin Donald 88 (37); Shadab Khan 3/34 (4 overs)

Lancashire Lightning won by 4 runs
County Cricket Ground, Derby
Umpires: Richard Kettleborough and David Millns

- Derbyshire Falcons won the toss and elected to field.

1 July 2026
19:00 (N)
Scorecard

Gloucestershire; 184/2 (20 overs)	v	Northamptonshire Steelbacks; 187/2 (17.2 overs)
Dawid Malan 91* (55); Calvin Harrison 1/29 (3 overs)		David Willey 73; Daaryoush Ahmed 2/35 (4 overs)

Northamptonshire Steelbacks won by 8 wickets
County Ground, Bristol
Umpires: Ian Blackwell and Ben Peverall

- Gloucestershire won the toss and elected to bat.

3 July 2026
18:30 (D/N)
Scorecard

Durham; 205/9 (20 overs)	v	Yorkshire; 208/5 (19.5 overs)
Alex Lees 73 (35); Jafer Chohan 3/30 (4 overs)		Jonny Bairstow 66 (36); Ben Raine 2/30 (4 overs)

Yorkshire won by 5 wickets
Headingley, Leeds
Umpires: Richard Kettleborough and Jack Shantry

- Durham won the toss and elected to bat.

3 July 2026
18:30 (D/N)
Scorecard

Warwickshire Bears; 184/4 (20 overs)	v	Glamorgan; 187/3 (18.5 overs)
Sam Hain 63* (46); Ben Kellaway 1/30 (4 overs)		Will Smale 62 (50); Usman Tariq 2/13 (4 overs)

Glamorgan won by 7 wickets
Sophia Gardens, Cardiff
Umpires: Nigel Llong and Simon Widdup

- Glamorgan won the toss and elected to field.

3 July 2026
19:00 (N)
Scorecard

Essex; 204/6 (20 overs)	v	Sussex Sharks; 104 (17.3 overs)
Michael Pepper 47 (29); Tymal Mills 2/42 (4 overs)		Tom Alsop 35 (35); Sam Cook 4/7 (3.3 overs)

Essex won by 100 runs
County Cricket Ground, Hove
Umpires: Ian Blackwell and James Tredwell

- Essex won the toss and elected to bat.

3 July 2026
18:30 (D/N)
Scorecard

Notts Outlaws; 181/6 (20 overs)	v	Lancashire Lightning; 180/7 (20 overs)
George Munsey 51 (39); Jack Blatherwick 2/34 (4 overs)		Liam Livingstone 47 (31); Liam Patterson-White 2/24 (3 overs)

Notts Outlaws won by 1 run
Trent Bridge, Nottingham
Umpires: Michael Gough and Paul Pollard
Player of the match: George Munsey (Notts Outlaws)

- Lancashire Lightning won the toss and elected to field.

3 July 2026
17:30 (D/N)
Scorecard

Worcestershire Rapids; 142/7 (20 overs)	v	Kent Spitfires; 59 (14.1 overs)
Adam Hose 47 (41); Matt Milnes 3/20 (4 overs)		Zak Crawley 13 (14); Sikandar Raza 2/8 (3 overs)

Worcestershire Rapids won by 83 runs
New Road, Worcester
Umpires: Richard Illingworth and Surendiran Shanmugam

- Kent Spitfires won the toss and elected to field.

4 July 2026
19:00 (N)
Scorecard

Gloucestershire; 191/5 (20 overs)	v	Surrey; 134 (19.4 overs)
D'Arcy Short 92* (56); Dan Lawrence 1/15 (2 overs)		Dan Lawrence 38 (31); James Hayes 3/23 (3.4 overs)

Gloucestershire won by 57 runs
County Ground, Bristol
Umpires: Tom Lungley and Rob White
Player of the match: D'Arcy Short (Gloucestershire)

- Surrey won the toss and elected to field.
- James Hayes (Gloucestershire) made his T20 debut.

5 July 2026
16:00
Scorecard

Essex; 142/8 (20 overs)	v	Middlesex; 143/6 (19 overs)
Simon Harmer 56* (28); Luke Hollman 4/21 (4 overs)		Leus du Plooy 38 (24); Simon Harmer 2/15 (4 overs)

Middlesex won by 4 wickets
County Cricket Ground, Chelmsford
Umpires: Paul Baldwin and Ben Debenham

- Middlesex won the toss and elected to field.

5 July 2026
15:30
Scorecard

Notts Outlaws; 166/8 (20 overs)	v	Durham; 164/6 (20 overs)
Joe Clarke 56 (35); Matthew Potts 3/32 (4 overs)		Alex Lees 43 (35); Liam Patterson-White 2/7 (2 overs)

Notts Outlaws won by 2 runs
Riverside Ground, Chester-le-Street
Umpires: Michael Gough and Steve O'Shaughnessy

- Durham won the toss and elected to field.

5 July 2026
15:30
Scorecard

Warwickshire Bears; 203/5 (20 overs)	v	Gloucestershire; 173/6 (20 overs)
Beau Webster 78 (44); Matthew Taylor 2/45 (4 overs)		Jack Taylor 48* (28); Usman Tariq 3/12 (4 overs)

Warwickshire Bears won by 30 runs
Edgbaston, Birmingham
Umpires: David Millns and Paul Pollard

- Warwickshire Bears won the toss and elected to bat.

5 July 2026
14:30
Scorecard

Yorkshire; 207/4 (20 overs)	v	Leicestershire Foxes; 166/9 (20 overs)
Adam Lyth 131* (63); Rehan Ahmed 3/33 (4 overs)		Ben Cox 47 (34); Andrew Tye 4/15 (4 overs)

Yorkshire won by 41 runs
Headingley, Leeds
Umpires: James Middlebrook and Neil Pratt

- Yorkshire won the toss and elected to bat.

5 July 2026
15:30
Scorecard

Worcestershire Rapids; 161/9 (20 overs)	v	Glamorgan; 146 (19.2 overs)
Gareth Roderick 71 (43); Ben Kellaway 3/24 (4 overs)		Ben Kellaway 43 (26); Fateh Singh 3/17 (3.2 overs)

Worcestershire Rapids won by 15 runs
Sophia Gardens, Cardiff
Umpires: Nigel Llong and Simon Widdup

- Worcestershire Rapids won the toss and elected to bat.

5 July 2026
15:30
Scorecard

Somerset; 223/4 (20 overs)	v	Northamptonshire Steelbacks; 118 (15.3 overs)
Thomas Rew 57 (30); Calvin Harrison 2/31 (4 overs)		Ricardo Vasconcelos 40 (23); Joshua Thomas 4/6 (3 overs)

Somerset won by 105 runs
County Cricket Ground, Northampton
Umpires: Surendiran Shanmugam and Rob White

- Northamptonshire Steelbacks won the toss and elected to field.

5 July 2026
15:30
Scorecard

Hampshire Hawks; 190/3 (20 overs)	v	Kent Spitfires; 171 (19.2 overs)
James Vince 63 (40); Hasan Mahmud 1/25 (4 overs)		Tawanda Muyeye 50 (30); Sonny Baker 4/25 (3.2 overs)

Hampshire Hawks won by 19 runs
The Rose Bowl, Southampton
Umpires: Anthony Harris and Tom Lungley

- Kent Spitfires won the toss and elected to field.

6 July 2026
18:30 (D/N)
Scorecard

Derbyshire Falcons; 150/9 (20 overs)	v	Lancashire Lightning; 150/8 (20 overs)
Martin Andersson 49 (37); James Anderson 2/21 (4 overs)		Liam Livingstone 31 (30); Sufyan Moqim 3/15 (4 overs)

Match tied
Old Trafford, Manchester
Umpires: Naeem Ashraf and David Millns

- Derbyshire Falcons won the toss and elected to bat.

8 July 2026
18:30 (D/N)
Scorecard

Sussex Sharks; 176/7 (20 overs)	v	Surrey; 177/2 (17.2 overs)
George Thomas 57 (27); Chris Jordan 2/23 (4 overs)		Jason Roy 103* (58); Sean Hunt 2/28 (3.2 overs)

Surrey won by 8 wickets
The Oval, London
Umpires: Paul Pollard and Rob White
Player of the match: Jason Roy (Surrey)

- Sussex Sharks won the toss and elected to bat.

8 July 2026
18:30 (D/N)
Scorecard

Northamptonshire Steelbacks; 217/7 (20 overs)	v	Glamorgan; 164 (18.3 overs)
Chris Lynn 117 (56); Ben Kellaway 3/22 (4 overs)		Kiran Carlson 42 (20); Calvin Harrison 3/20 (4 overs)

Northamptonshire Steelbacks won by 53 runs
Sophia Gardens, Cardiff
Umpires: Paul Baldwin and Jack Shantry

- Northamptonshire Steelbacks won the toss and elected to bat.

8 July 2026
18:30 (D/N)
Scorecard

Derbyshire Falcons; 214/6 (20 overs)	v	Somerset; 187/7 (20 overs)
Will Smeed 89 (51); Martin Andersson 3/33 (4 overs)		Aneurin Donald 65 (27); Daniel Sams 3/29 (4 overs)

Somerset won by 27 runs
County Cricket Ground, Derby
Umpires: James Middlebrook and David Millns

- Somerset won the toss and elected to bat.

8 July 2026
18:30 (D/N)
Scorecard

Leicestershire Foxes; 156/8 (20 overs)	v	Durham; 160/2 (15 overs)
Josh Davey 37* (24); Callum Parkinson 2/23 (4 overs)		Alex Lees 80 (44); Josh Davey 1/21 (2 overs)

Durham won by 8 wickets
Grace Road, Leicester
Umpires: Hassan Adnan and Simon Widdup

- Leicestershire Foxes won the toss and elected to bat.

8 July 2026
19:00 (N)
Scorecard

Hampshire Hawks; 159/4 (20 overs)	v	Middlesex; 162/5 (19 overs)
Ben Mayes 47* (37); Luke Hollman 1/14 (4 overs)		Max Holden 62 (49); Andrew Neal 3/29 (4 overs)

Middlesex won by 5 wickets
Rose Bowl, Southampton
Umpires: Tom Lungley and Surendiran Shanmugam

- Middlesex won the toss and elected to field.

10 July 2026
19:00 (N)
Scorecard

Hampshire Hawks; 130 (15.5 overs)	v	Essex; 134/3 (16 overs)
Joe Weatherley 34 (20); Matt Critchley 4/16 (3.5 overs)		Paul Walter 52* (37); Sonny Baker 2/28 (4 overs)

Essex won by 7 wickets
County Cricket Ground, Chelmsford
Umpires: Mark Newell and James Tredwell

- Essex won the toss and elected to field.

10 July 2026
18:30 (D/N)
Scorecard

Durham; 165/7 (20 overs)	v	Derbyshire Falcons; 160/6 (20 overs)
Colin Ackermann 69* (44); Akif Javed 3/30 (4 overs)		Martin Andersson 44 (37); Brydon Carse 2/28 (4 overs)

Durham won by 5 runs
Riverside Ground, Chester-le-Street
Umpires: Graeme Cross and David Millns

- Durham won the toss and elected to bat.

10 July 2026
19:00 (N)
Scorecard

Glamorgan; 188/4 (20 overs)	v	Warwickshire Bears; 191/6 (19.5 overs)
Will Smale 58 (36); Usman Tariq 2/26 (4 overs)		Rob Yates 72 (40); Ben Kellaway 3/35 (4 overs)

Warwickshire Bears won by 4 wickets
Edgbaston, Birmingham
Umpires: Hassan Adnan and Anthony Harris

- Glamorgan won the toss and elected to bat.

10 July 2026
19:00 (N)
Scorecard

Lancashire Lightning; 216/6 (20 overs)	v	Yorkshire; 194/8 (20 overs)
Liam Livingstone 60 (39); Logan van Beek 3/42 (4 overs)		Matt Revis 52 (38); Mitchell Stanley 4/30 (4 overs)

Lancashire won by 22 runs
Old Trafford, Manchester
Umpires: Michael Gough and Steve O'Shaughnessy
Player of the match: Mitchell Stanley (Lancashire)

- Lancashire won the toss and elected to bat.

10 July 2026
17:00 (D/N)
Scorecard

Sussex Sharks; 213/3 (20 overs)	v	Middlesex; 195/9 (20 overs)
Daniel Hughes 108* (52); Naavya Sharma 2/34 (4 overs)		Max Holden 52 (20); Tymal Mills 3/34 (4 overs)

Sussex Sharks won by 18 runs
Merchant Taylors' School Ground, Northwood
Umpires: Ian Blackwell and Ben Peverall

- Middlesex won the toss and elected to field.

10 July 2026
18:30 (D/N)
Scorecard

Northamptonshire Steelbacks; 162/8 (20 overs)	v	Somerset; 164/3 (15 overs)
Lewis McManus 76 (43); Daniel Sams 3/16 (4 overs)		Will Smeed 46 (20); Thomas Rew 46 (20); George Scrimshaw 1/27 (3 overs)

Somerset won by 7 wickets
County Ground, Taunton
Umpires: Nigel Long and Tom Lungley

- Somerset won the toss and elected to field.

10 July 2026
18:30 (D/N)
Scorecard

Kent Spitfires; 102 (17 overs)	v	Surrey; 106/1 (8.5 overs)
Zak Crawley 31 (19); Jordan Clark 3/26 (4 overs)		Jason Roy 50* (29); Hasan Mahmud 1/34 (3 overs)

Surrey won by 9 wickets
St Lawrence Ground, Canterbury
Umpires: Ben Debenham and Surendiran Shanmugam

- Surrey won the toss and elected to field.
- Ekansh Singh (Kent Spitfires) made his T20 debut.

10 July 2026
18:30 (D/N)
Scorecard

Leicestershire Foxes; 143/7 (20 overs)	v	Notts Outlaws; 149/4 (18.2 overs)
Stephen Eskinazi 52* (41); George Linde 3/31 (4 overs)		Tom Moores 51* (33); Alex Green 2/18 (3 overs)

Notts Outlaws won by 7 wickets
Trent Bridge, Nottingham
Umpires: Naeem Ashraf and Paul Pollard

- Leicestershire Foxes won the toss and elected to bat.
- Sheridon Gumbs (Leicestershire Foxes) made his T20 debut.

10 July 2026
17:30 (D/N)
Scorecard

Worcestershire Rapids; 181/5 (20 overs)	v	Gloucestershire; 182/8 (19 overs)
Kashif Ali 58* (24); James Hayes 2/14 (3 overs)		Kamran Dhariwal 70 (22); Fateh Singh 2/16 (3 overs)

Gloucestershire won by 2 wickets
New Road, Worcester
Umpires: Paul Baldwin and Neil Pratt

- Worcestershire Rapids won the toss and elected to bat.
- Dan Lategan (Worcestershre Rapids) made his T20 debut.

12 July 2026
15:30
Scorecard

Durham; 141 (20 overs)	v	Lancashire Lightning; 142/7 (19.4 overs)
Colin Ackermann 66* (45); Saqib Mahmood 3/20 (4 overs)		Keaton Jennings 41* (33); Ben Raine 4/21 (4 overs)

Lancashire Lightning won by 3 wickets
Old Trafford, Manchester
Umpires: Naeem Ashraf and Paul Pollard

- Durham won the toss and elected to bat.

12 July 2026
15:30
Scorecard

Yorkshire; 193 (20 overs)	v	Notts Outlaws; 175 (19.3 overs)
Adam Lyth 52 (27); Liam Patterson-White 3/13 (4 overs)		Dillon Pennington 37 (20); Andrew Tye 3/18 (3.3 overs)

Yorkshire won by 18 runs
Headingley, Leeds
Umpires: Michael Gough and David Millns

- Yorkshire won the toss and elected to bat.

12 July 2026
18:30 (D/N)
Scorecard

Surrey; 123 (19.3 overs)	v	Essex; 124/2 (16.5 overs)
Josh Philippe 33 (25); Matt Critchley 3/16 (4 overs)		Michael Pepper 71* (56); Sean Abbott 1/19 (2 overs)

Essex won by 8 wickets
The Oval, London
Umpires: Tom Lungley and Mark Newell

- Essex won the toss and elected to field.

12 July 2026
14:30
Scorecard

Sussex Sharks; 186/5 (20 overs)	v	Hampshire Hawks; 190/6 (19.5 overs)
Daniel Hughes 55 (32); Sonny Baker 2/38 (4 overs)		Hilton Cartwright 70 (31); Jack Carson 3/43 (3.3 overs)

Hampshire Hawks won by 4 wickets
County Cricket Ground, Hove
Umpires: Ben Debenham and Graham Lloyd

- Hampshire Hawks won the toss and elected to field.

12 July 2026
14:30
Scorecard

Leicestershire Foxes; 178/8 (20 overs)	v	Derbyshire Falcons; 172/3 (14.3 overs)
Ashton Turner 79 (43); Akif Javed 4/23 (4 overs)		Aneurin Donald 91 (38); Rehan Ahmed 2/46 (4 overs)

Derbyshire Falcons won by 7 wickets
County Cricket Ground, Derby
Umpires: Neil Pratt and Simon Widdup

- Leicestershire Foxes won the toss and elected to bat.

12 July 2026
18:35 (D/N)
Scorecard

Somerset; 194/7 (20 overs)	v	Worcestershire Rapids; 116 (16 overs)
Will Smeed 52 (31); Matthew Waite 3/39 (4 overs)		Gareth Roderick 39 (28); Riley Meredith 3/17 (3 overs)

Somerset won by 78 runs
County Ground, Taunton
Umpires: Hassan Adnan and Steve O'Shaughnessy
Player of the match: Jack Leach (Somerset)

- Worcestershire Rapids won the toss and elected to field.

12 July 2026
14:30
Scorecard

Northamptonshire Steelbacks; 153 (20 overs)	v	Warwickshire Bears; 154/5 (18.2 overs)
Saif Zaib 37 (24); Beau Webster 3/30 (4 overs)		Kai Smith 65* (40); George Scrimshaw 3/36 (4 overs)

Warwickshire Bears won by 5 wickets
County Cricket Ground, Northampton
Umpires: Ian Blackwell and Rob White

- Northamptonshire Steelbacks won the toss and elected to bat.
- Hamza Shaikh (Warwickshire Bears) made his T20 debut.

12 July 2026
14:30
Scorecard

Glamorgan; 235/7 (20 overs)	v	Gloucestershire; 185 (19.1 overs)
Kiran Carlson 73 (40); D'Arcy Short 2/29 (3 overs)		Dawid Malan 39 (27); Ben Kellaway 2/31 (4 overs)

Glamorgan won by 50 runs
County Ground, Bristol
Umpires: Nigel Llong and Ben Peverall

- Glamorgan won the toss and elected to bat.

12 July 2026
14:30
Scorecard

Middlesex; 172/6 (20 overs)	v	Kent Spitfires; 158/7 (20 overs)
Luke Hollman 34* (22); Jake Lintott 2/31 (4 overs)		Daniel Bell-Drummond 47 (34); Zafar Gohar 3/38 (4 overs)

Middlesex won by 14 runs
St Lawrence Ground, Canterbury
Umpires: Surendiran Shanmugam and James Tredwell

- Kent Spitfires won the toss and elected to bat.
- Jaydn Denly (Kent Spitfires) made his T20 debut.

== Knock-out stage ==
=== Bracket ===
Quarter-finals
C1	Northamptonshire Steelbacks	153/2
C3	Gloucestershire	152
N2	Yorkshire	161/9
C2	Somerset	162/8
N1	Notts Outlaws	163/6
S2	Surrey	156/7
S1	Hampshire Hawks	211/3
S3	Essex	136/9

Semi-finals
Q2	Northamptonshire Steelbacks	143 (19.2 overs)
Q4	Somerset	126/9 (20 overs)
Q3	Notts Outlaws	160 (19.5 overs)
Q1	Hampshire Hawks	187/3 (20 overs)

Final
SF1	Northamptonshire Steelbacks	169 (19.5 overs)
SF2	Hampshire Hawks	155 (19.2 overs)

=== Quarter-finals ===
Quarter-final 1
15 July 2026
16:30
Scorecard

Hampshire Hawks; 211/3 (20 overs)	v	Essex; 136/9 (20 overs)
James Vince 125 (61); Sam Cook 1/30 (4 overs)		Charlie Allison 44 (33); Sonny Baker 5/24 (4 overs)

Hampshire Hawks won by 75 runs
Rose Bowl, Southampton
Umpires: Ian Blackwell and Nigel Long

- Essex won the toss and elected to field.

Quarter-final 2
15 July 2026
17:00 (D/N)
Scorecard

Gloucestershire; 152 (20 overs)	v	Northamptonshire Steelbacks; 153/2 (17.4 overs)
Ben Charlesworth 68 (38); Ben Sanderson 4/20 (4 overs)		David Willey 47* (33); D'Arcy Short 1/27 (4 overs)

Northamptonshire Steelbacks won by 8 wickets
County Ground, Northampton
Umpires: Ben Debenham and Tom Lungley

- Gloucestershire won the toss and elected to bat.

Quarter-final 3
15 July 2026
16:30
Scorecard

Notts Outlaws; 163/6 (20 overs)	v	Surrey; 156/7 (20 overs)
Jack Haynes 75* (55); Chris Jordan 3/22 (4 overs)		Jason Roy 76 (50); George Linde 2/23 (4 overs); Olly Stone 2/23 (3 overs)

Notts Outlaws won by 7 runs
Trent Bridge, Nottingham
Umpires: Paul Pollard and Steve O'Shaughnessy

- Notts Outlaws won the toss and elected to bat.

Quarter-final 4
15 July 2026
16:30
Scorecard

Yorkshire; 161/9 (20 overs)	v	Somerset; 162/8 (19.5 overs)
Adam Lyth 64 (40); Jake Ball 3/30 (4 overs)		Craig Overton 79* (30); George Hill 2/12 (4 overs)

Somerset won by 2 wickets
Headingley, Leeds
Umpires: James Middlebrook and Rob White

- Yorkshire won the toss and elected to bat.

== Finals Day ==
=== Semi-finals ===
Semi-final 1
18 July 2026
11:00
Scorecard

Northamptonshire Steelbacks; 143 (19.2 overs)	v	Somerset; 126/9 (20 overs)
Chris Lynn 39 (26); Jake Ball 4/17 (4 overs)		Will Smeed 49 (35); David Willey 3/17 (4 overs)

Northamptonshire Steelbacks won by 17 runs
Edgbaston, Birmingham
Umpires: James Middlebrook and Rob White
Player of the match: David Willey (Northamptonshire Steelbacks)

- Somerset won the toss and elected to field.

Semi-final 2
18 July 2026
14:45
Scorecard

Hampshire Hawks; 187/3 (20 overs)	v	Notts Outlaws; 160 (19.5 overs)
Joe Weatherley 88* (58); Benny Howell 1/21 (3 overs)		Joe Clarke 64 (43); James Fuller 4/26 (3.5 overs)

Hampshire Hawks won by 27 runs
Edgbaston, Birmingham
Umpires: Ian Blackwell and Tom Lungley
Player of the match: Joe Weatherley (Hampshire Hawks)

- Notts Outlaws won the toss and elected to field.

=== Final ===
Final
18 July 2026
18:45 (D/N)
Scorecard

Northamptonshire Steelbacks; 169 (19.5 overs)	v	Hampshire Hawks; 155 (19.2 overs)
Ricardo Vasconcelos 88 (59); Sonny Baker 5/21 (4 overs)		Joe Weatherley 75 (53); James Sales 3/25 (4 overs)

Northamptonshire Steelbacks won by 14 runs
Edgbaston, Birmingham
Umpires: James Middlebrook and Rob White
Player of the match: Ricardo Vasconcelos (Northamptonshire Steelbacks)

- Hampshire Hawks won the toss and elected to field.
