= 2026 One-Day Cup =

Cricket tournament

- Dates: 21 July – 20 September 2026
- Administrator: England and Wales Cricket Board
- Cricket format: List A
- Tournament format(s): Group stage and knockout
- Champions: Middlesex (2nd title)
- Participants: 18
- Matches: 77
- Most runs: Kyle Verreynne (591)
- Most wickets: Naavya Sharma (20)
- Official website: ecb.co.uk

The 2026 One-Day Cup (also known for sponsorship reasons as the 2026 Metro Bank One Day Cup) was the thirteenth edition of the One-Day Cup, a cricket tournament played in England and Wales. Matches were contested with 50 overs per side, having List A cricket status, with all eighteen first-class counties competing in the tournament. The tournament began on 21 July and ended on 20 September 2026. Worcestershire were the defending champions, having won the previous season after beating Hampshire in the rain-affected final.

Middlesex won the tournament, beating Leicestershire by 31 runs in the final.

== Teams ==
The teams are placed into the following groups:

- Group A: Gloucestershire, Kent, Lancashire, Leicestershire Foxes, Northamptonshire Steelbacks, Notts Outlaws, Somerset, Surrey, Warwickshire
- Group B: Derbyshire Falcons, Durham, Essex, Glamorgan, Hampshire, Middlesex, Sussex Sharks, Worcestershire Rapids, Yorkshire

In the group stage of the competition, each county plays each of the other eight counties in its group once.

== Standings ==
=== Group A ===
| Pos | Team | Pld | W | L | T | NR | Pts | NRR | Qualification |
|---|---|---|---|---|---|---|---|---|---|
| 1 | Leicestershire Foxes | 8 | 5 | 3 | 0 | 0 | 20 | 0.517 | Advanced to the semi-final |
| 2 | Lancashire | 8 | 5 | 3 | 0 | 0 | 20 | 0.406 | Advanced to the quarter-final |
| 3 | Notts Outlaws | 8 | 5 | 3 | 0 | 0 | 20 | 0.177 | Advanced to the quarter-final |
| 4 | Warwickshire | 8 | 4 | 4 | 0 | 0 | 16 | 0.078 | |
| 5 | Surrey | 8 | 4 | 4 | 0 | 0 | 16 | −0.238 | |
| 6 | Kent | 8 | 4 | 4 | 0 | 0 | 16 | −0.607 | |
| 7 | Northamptonshire Steelbacks | 8 | 3 | 5 | 0 | 0 | 12 | 0.127 | |
| 8 | Gloucestershire | 8 | 3 | 5 | 0 | 0 | 12 | −0.096 | |
| 9 | Somerset | 8 | 3 | 5 | 0 | 0 | 12 | −0.383 | |

Source: BBC Sport Cricinfo

=== Group B ===
| Pos | Team | Pld | W | L | NR | Pts | NRR | Qualification |
|---|---|---|---|---|---|---|---|---|
| 1 | Middlesex | 8 | 7 | 1 | 0 | 28 | 1.659 | Advanced to the semi-final |
| 2 | Yorkshire | 8 | 6 | 2 | 0 | 24 | 0.778 | Advanced to the quarter-final |
| 3 | Durham | 8 | 5 | 3 | 0 | 20 | 0.089 | Advanced to the quarter-final |
| 4 | Worcestershire Rapids | 8 | 5 | 3 | 0 | 20 | 0.032 | |
| 5 | Hampshire | 8 | 4 | 4 | 0 | 16 | −0.083 | |
| 6 | Derbyshire Falcons | 8 | 3 | 5 | 0 | 12 | 0.156 | |
| 7 | Essex | 8 | 3 | 5 | 0 | 12 | −0.203 | |
| 8 | Glamorgan | 8 | 2 | 6 | 0 | 8 | −0.930 | |
| 9 | Sussex Sharks | 8 | 1 | 7 | 0 | 2 | −1.517 | |

Source: BBC Sport Cricinfo
- Sussex Sharks were deducted 2 points after agreeing to a financial support package from the England and Wales Cricket Board (ECB).

== Fixtures ==
In November 2025, the England and Wales Cricket Board confirmed the fixtures for the tournament as a part of the 2026 English domestic cricket season.

=== July ===
21 July 2026
11:00
Scorecard

| Derbyshire Falcons; 256/9 (50 overs) | v | Durham; 257/5 (49.1 overs) |
| Martin Andersson 112 (118); Luke Robinson 4/44 (10 overs) | | Ben Stokes 108* (123); Ben Aitchison 3/31 (10 overs) |

Durham won by 5 wickets
County Ground, Derby
Umpires: Paul Pollard and Mohammed Waseem

- Derbyshire Falcons won the toss and elected to bat.

21 July 2026
11:00
Scorecard

| Lancashire; 280/5 (50 overs) | v | Surrey; 285/3 (47.4 overs) |
| Michael Jones 67* (45); Tiaan van Vuuren 1/18 (6 overs) | | Adam Thomas 82* (76); Harry Singh 1/31 (5 overs) |

Surrey won by 7 wickets
The Cricket Field, Sedbergh School
Umpires: Graeme Cross and Simon Widdup

- Surrey won the toss and elected to field.

21 July 2026
11:00
Scorecard

| Middlesex; 294/8 (50 overs) | v | Essex; 253 (46.2 overs) |
| Nathan Fernandes 112 (130); Matt Critchley 4/55 (10 overs) | | Noah Thain 74 (93); Noah Cornwell 2/29 (5 overs) |

Middlesex won by 41 runs
Brunton Memorial Ground, Radlett
Umpires: Sam Hollingshead and Nigel Llong

- Essex won the toss and elected to field.
- Naavya Sharma (Middlesex) and Ali Zeb (Essex) both made their List A debuts.
- Nathan Fernandes (Middlesex) scored his maiden century in List A cricket.

21 July 2026
11:00
Scorecard

| Warwickshire; 319/9 (50 overs) | v | Northamptonshire Steelbacks; 314/5 (48.4 overs) |
| Sam Hain 80 (66); Raphael Weatherall 4/56 (10 overs) | | Nathan McSweeney 88 (92); Tazeem Ali 2/52 (10 overs) |

Northamptonshire Steelbacks won by 5 wickets
County Ground, Northampton
Umpires: Surendiran Shanmugam and James Tredwell

- Northamptonshire Steelbacks won the toss and elected to field.
- Jake Garlick (Warwickshire) made his List A debut.

21 July 2026
11:00
Scorecard

| Somerset; 258/9 (50 overs) | v | Notts Outlaws; 259/6 (44.4 overs) |
| Tom Lammonby 92 (109); Joe Pocklington 3/28 (5 overs) | | Freddie McCann 70 (82); Migael Pretorius 4/41 (9.4 overs) |

Notts Outlaws won by 4 wickets
John Fretwell Sporting Complex, Sookholme
Umpires: Naeem Ashraf and Tom Lungley

- Notts Outlaws won the toss and elected to field.
- Ben Church, Johnny Connell and Savin Perera (Somerset) all made their List A debuts.

21 July 2026
11:00
Scorecard

| Hampshire; 320/8 (50 overs) | v | Yorkshire; 270 (47 overs) |
| Tom Prest 109 (94); Isaac Bepey 3/64 (10 overs) | | Will Luxton 64 (59); Ashutosh Sharma 3/48 (9 overs) |

Hampshire won by 50 runs
North Marine Road Ground, Scarborough
Umpires: David Millns and Neil Pratt

- Yorkshire won the toss and elected to field.
- Isaac Bepey (Yorkshire), Harry Petrie and Ollie Williams (Hampshire) all made their List A debuts.

22 July 2026
11:00
Scorecard

| Glamorgan; 295/8 (50 overs) | v | Sussex Sharks; 283/8 (50 overs) |
| Jack Hope-Bell 123 (118); Fynn Hudson-Prentice 5/62 (10 overs) | | Jack Carson 81 (72); Dan Douthwaite 4/54 (10 overs) |

Glamorgan won by 12 runs
The Gnoll, Neath
Umpires: Mile Burns and Anthony Harris

- Sussex Sharks won the toss and elected to field.
- Jack Hope-Bell, Callum Nicholls (Glamorgan), Ollie Kirtley and Toby Munt (Sussex Sharks) all made their List A debuts.
- Jack Hope-Bell and Alex Horton (Glamorgan) both scored their maiden century in List A cricket.
- Fynn Hudson-Prentice (Sussex Sharks) took his maiden five-wicket haul in List A cricket.

22 July 2026
11:00
Scorecard

| Gloucestershire; 235 (49 overs) | v | Leicestershire Foxes; 239/8 (48.2 overs) |
| Cameron Bancroft 40 (52); Alex Green 3/53 (10 overs) | | Ben Cox 51 (59); Graeme van Buuren 2/43 (10 overs) |

Leicestershire Foxes won by 2 wickets
Kibworth Cricket Club New Ground, Kibworth
Umpires: Hassan Adnan and Paul Pollard

- Gloucestershire won the toss and elected to bat.
- Aman Rao and Kamran Dhariwal (Gloucestershire) both made their List A debuts.

23 July 2026
11:00
Scorecard

| Warwickshire; 282 (49.5 overs) | v | Notts Outlaws; 283/7 (48.3 overs) |
| George Garton 117 (101); Joe Pocklington 3/40 (10 overs) | | Kyle Verreynne 68* (66); Jake Lintott 3/55 (10 overs) |

Notts Outlaws won by 3 wickets
John Fretwell Sporting Complex, Sookholme
Umpires: Sam Hollingshead and Mark Newell

- Notts Outlaws won the toss and elected to field.
- George Garton (Warwickshire) scored his first century in List A cricket.

24 July 2026
13:30 (D/N)
Scorecard

| Durham; 352/5 (50 overs) | v | Sussex Sharks; 280 (43.5 overs) |
| Alex Lees 132 (115); Jack Carson 2/74 (8 overs) | | Charlie Tear 118 (112); Will Rhodes 5/51 (9.5 overs) |

Durham won by 72 runs
Riverside Ground, Chester-le-Street
Umpires: Rob White and Simon Widdup

- Durham won the toss and elected to bat.
- Nantes Oosthuizen and Freddie Price (Sussex Sharks) both made their List A debuts.

24 July 2026
11:00
Scorecard

| Glamorgan; 186 (47 overs) | v | Yorkshire; 190/8 (48.4 overs) |
| Eddie Byrom 68 (95); Ben Cliff 4/29 (8 overs) | | Finlay Bean 43* (52); Jamie McIlroy 2/23 (9.4 overs) |

Yorkshire won by 2 wickets
The Gnoll, Neath
Umpires: Bilal Shafayat and James Tredwell

- Glamorgan won the toss and elected to bat.

24 July 2026
11:00
Scorecard

| Middlesex; 284/8 (50 overs) | v | Hampshire; 124 (31.2 overs) |
| Josh de Caires 75 (98); Ashutosh Sharma 4/54 (9 overs) | | Nick Gubbins 34 (39); Josh de Caires 6/35 (10 overs) |

Middlesex won by 160 runs
Rose Bowl, Southampton
Umpires: Gareth Cross and Ben Peverall

- Middlesex won the toss and elected to bat.
- Jack Nelson and Aaryan Sawant (Middlesex) both made their List A debuts.
- Josh de Caires (Hampshire) took his first five-wicket haul in List A cricket.

24 July 2026
11:00
Scorecard

| Northamptonshire Steelbacks; 253 (48.1 overs) | v | Kent; 254/5 (48 overs) |
| Nathan McSweeney 58 (80); Grant Stewart 3/33 (9 overs) | | Harry Finch 85 (91); Luke Procter 3/44 (10 overs) |

Kent won by 5 wickets
St Lawrence Ground, Canterbury
Umpires: David Millns and Casper Viljoen

- Kent won the toss and elected to field.

24 July 2026
14:00 (D/N)
Scorecard

| Somerset; 352/7 (50 overs) | v | Gloucestershire; 317 (47.3 overs) |
| Josh Thomas 97* (66); Graeme van Buuren 3/66 (10 overs) | | Graeme van Buuren 96* (82); Josh Shaw 3/62 (9 overs) |

Somerset won by 35 runs
County Ground, Taunton
Umpires: Ian Blackwell and Mohammed Waseem

- Gloucestershire won the toss and elected to field.
- Luke Charlesworth (Gloucestershire) made his List A debut.

24 July 2026
Scorecard

| Surrey; 270/9 (50 overs) | v | Leicestershire Foxes; 273/5 (46.4 overs) |
| Ryan Patel 97 (101); Ruan de Swardt 4/49 (10 overs) | | Rishi Patel 110 (109); Ryan Patel 3/44 (9 overs) |

Leicestershire Foxes won by 5 wickets
Woodbridge Road, Guildford
Umpires: Naeem Ashraf and Chris Watts

- Leicestershire Foxes won the toss and elected to field.
- Hamza Shaikh (Leicestershire Foxes) scored his maiden century in List A cricket.

24 July 2026
11:00
Scorecard

| Derbyshire Falcons; 138 (37.1 overs) | v | Worcestershire Rapids; 143/7 (37.2 overs) |
| Martin Andersson 51 (71); Fateh Singh 6/32 (9 overs) | | Gareth Roderick 39* (58); Nick Potts 3/30 (6 overs) |

Worcestershire Rapids won by 3 wickets
New Road, Worcester
Umpires: Anthony Harris and Phil Mustard

- Worcestershire Rapids won the toss and elected to field.
- Fateh Singh (Worcestershire Rapids) took his maiden five-wicket haul in List A cricket.

26 July 2026
11:00
Scorecard

| Essex; 257/7 (50 overs) | v | Derbyshire Falcons; 248/9 (50 overs) |
| Tom Westley 102 (97); Anuj Dal 3/33 (8 overs) | | Harry Came 97 (94); Charlie Bennett 3/32 (5 overs) |

Essex won by 9 runs
County Ground, Chelmsford
Umpires: Naeem Ashraf and Casper Viljoen

- Derbyshire Falcons won the toss and elected to field.

26 July 2026
11:00
Scorecard

| Kent; 208 (48.4 overs) | v | Gloucestershire; 212/4 (36.1 overs) |
| Sam Northeast 84 (107); Will Williams 3/33 (10 overs) | | Cameron Bancroft 89* (98); Jaydn Denly 2/31 (4 overs) |

Gloucestershire won by 6 wickets
County Ground, Bristol
Umpires: Bilal Shafayat and James Tredwell

- Gloucestershire won the toss and elected to field.

26 July 2026
11:00
Scorecard

| Lancashire; 383/4 (50 overs) | v | Leicestershire Foxes; 262/8 (50 overs) |
| Keaton Jennings 135 (134); Ruan de Swardt 2/55 (10 overs) | | Ruan de Swardt 126 (116); Tom Bailey 3/48 (10 overs) |

Lancashire won by 21 runs
Grace Road, Leicester
Umpires: Hassan Adnan and Phil Mustard

- Leicestershire Foxes won the toss and elected to field.

26 July 2026
Scorecard

| Glamorgan; 66 (20.5 overs) | v | Middlesex; 67/2 (9.1 overs) |
| Eddie Byrom 29 (34); Naavya Sharma 4/29 (7 overs) | | Josh de Caires 45* (30); Tom Edwards 2/7 (3 overs) |

Middlesex won by 8 wickets
Brunton Memorial Ground, Radlett
Umpires: Gareth Cross and Anthony Harris

- Middlesex won the toss and elected to field.
- Tom Edwards and Connor O'Riordan (Glamorgan) both made their List A debuts.

26 July 2026
11:00
Scorecard

| Somerset; 337/8 (50 overs) | v | Warwickshire; 212 (39.4 overs) |
| Lewis Goldsworthy 103 (90); Jake Lintott 3/69 (10 overs) | | Jake Lintott 52 (52); James Theedom 4/54 (9.4 overs) |

Somerset won by 125 runs
County Ground, Taunton
Umpires: Sam Hollingshead and Ben Peverall

- Warwickshire won the toss and elected to field.
- Charlie Taylor (Warwickshire) made his List A debut.

26 July 2026
Scorecard

| Northamptonshire Steelbacks; 254/8 (50 overs) | v | Surrey; 258/4 (43.1 overs) |
| Nathan McSweeney 64 (89); Benji Floros 4/60 (10 overs) | | Adam Thomas 83* (84); Rob Keogh 2/73 (10 overs) |

Surrey won by 6 wickets
Woodbridge Road, Guildford
Umpires: Martin Saggers and Mohammed Waseem

- Surrey won the toss and elected to field.

26 July 2026
11:00
Scorecard

| Yorkshire; 325/7 (48 overs) | v | Sussex Sharks; 140 (27.5 overs) |
| Will Luxton 117 (115); Sean Hunt 3/54 (9 overs) | | Fynn Hudson-Prentice 50 (30); Ben Coad 5/12 (7 overs) |

Yorkshire won by 184 runs (DLS method)
County Ground, Hove
Umpires: Ian Blackwell and Mark Newell

- Sussex Sharks won the toss and elected to field.
- The match was reduced to 48 overs per side due to rain.

26 July 2026
11:00
Scorecard

| Worcestershire Rapids; 307/8 (50 overs) | v | Hampshire; 303 (49.4 overs) |
| Kashif Ali 65 (63); Harry Petrie 2/30 (8 overs) | | Tom Prest 70 (55); Fateh Singh 3/81 (9.4 overs) |

Worcestershire Rapids won by 4 runs
New Road, Worcester
Umpires: Jack Shantry and Surendiran Shanmugam

- Hampshire won the toss and elected to field.

28 July 2026
11:00
Scorecard

| Kent; 223 (46.5 overs) | v | Lancashire; 227/4 (47.5 overs) |
| Daniel Bell-Drummond 56 (83); Mitchell Stanley 3/43 (10 overs) | | Matthew Hurst 55 (89); Jaydn Denly 1/28 (3.5 overs) |

Lancashire won by 6 wickets
Farington Cricket Ground, Farington
Umpires: Gareth Cross and Steve O'Shaughnessy

- Lancashire won the toss and elected to field.

28 July 2026
11:00
Scorecard

| Leicestershire Foxes; 199 (48.2 overs) | v | Notts Outlaws; 200/5 (42.3 overs) |
| Stephen Eskinazi 93* (141); Joe Pocklington 4/40 (10 overs) | | Ben Martindale 50 (69); Mohammad Rizvi 2/42 (10 overs) |

Notts Outlaws won by 5 wickets
Trent Bridge, Nottingham
Umpires: Connor McGarry and Mike Burns

- Leicestershire Foxes won the toss and elected to bat.

29 July 2026
11:00
Scorecard

| Glamorgan; 326/6 (50 overs) | v | Durham; 328/7 (49.3 overs) |
| Eddie Byrom 76 (74); Will Rhodes 2/31 (6 overs) | | Will Rhodes 148* (122); Zain-ul-Hassan 2/55 (10 overs) |

Durham won by 3 wickets
Roseworth Terrace, Gosforth
Umpires: Chris Watts and Neil Pratt

- Durham won the toss and elected to field.

29 July 2026
11:00
Scorecard

| Essex; 316/6 (50 overs) | v | Sussex Sharks; 320/5 (49.2 overs) |
| Noah Thain 102 (116); Fynn Hudson-Prentice 1/6 (2 overs) | | Charlie Tear 73 (72); Matt Critchley 2/68 (10 overs) |

Sussex Sharks won by 5 wickets
Arundel Castle Cricket Ground, Arundel
Umpires: Ben Peverall and Surendiran Shanmugam

- Essex won the toss and elected to bat.
- Joe Johnson (Sussex Sharks) made his List A debut.

29 July 2026
11:00
Scorecard

| Warwickshire; 341/4 (50 overs) | v | Surrey; 296 (47 overs) |
| Ed Barnard 140 (130); Tom Ealham 2/65 (9 overs) | | Dom Sibley 74 (80); Oliver Hannon-Dalby 5/60 (10 overs) |

Warwickshire won by 45 runs
Edgbaston, Birmingham
Umpires: Connor McGarry and Jack Shantry

- Surrey won the toss and elected to field.

29 July 2026
11:00
Scorecard

| Worcestershire Rapids; 230 (50 overs) | v | Yorkshire; 231/4 (40.4 overs) |
| Henry Cullen 70 (88); George Hill 3/54 (10 overs) | | Will Luxton 126 (114); Ben Gibbon 2/49 (7.1 overs) |

Yorkshire won by 6 wickets
Clifton Park Ground, York
Umpires: Hassan Adnan and James Middlebrook

- Yorkshire won the toss and elected to field.

30 July 2026
11:00
Scorecard

| Lancashire; 220 (49.1 overs) | v | Notts Outlaws; 189 (47.1 overs) |
| Arav Shetty 53 (57); Farhan Ahmed 3/26 (10 overs) | | Kyle Verreynne 61 (87); Jack Blatherwick 4/30 (8.1 overs) |

Lancashire won by 31 runs
Farington Cricket Ground, Farington
Umpires: Naeem Ashraf and Sam Hollingshead

- Notts Outlaws won the toss and elected to field.

31 July 2026
11:00
Scorecard

| Derbyshire Falcons; 315/5 (50 overs) | v | Glamorgan; 271 (47.3 overs) |
| Brooke Guest 108* (82); Dan Douthwaite 3/66 (10 overs) | | Alex Horton 81 (57); Nick Potts 4/39 (8.3 overs) |

Derbyshire Falcons won by 44 runs
Repton School Ground, Repton
Umpires: Paul Baldwin and Mohammed Waseem

- Glamorgan won the toss and elected to field.

31 July 2026
11:00
Scorecard

| Essex; 317 (49 overs) | v | Hampshire; 321/7 (47.4 overs) |
| Noah Thain 109 (96); Ashutosh Sharma 5/51 (10 overs) | | James Fuller 58* (31); Mackenzie Jones 2/59 (8.4 overs) |

Hampshire won by 3 wickets
County Ground, Chelmsford
Umpires: Phil Mustard and Mark Newell

- Essex won the toss and elected to bat.

31 July 2026
14:00 (D/N)
Scorecard

| Surrey; 311/5 (50 overs) | v | Gloucestershire; 292 (49 overs) |
| Dom Sibley 101 (126); Ollie Price 2/45 (7 overs) | | Graeme van Buuren 85 (79); Ralphie Albert 3/48 (8 overs) |

Surrey won by 19 runs
County Ground, Bristol
Umpires: Surendiran Shanmugam and Casper Viljoen

- Gloucestershire won the toss and elected to field.

31 July 2026
11:00
Scorecard

| Somerset; 313/9 (50 overs) | v | Kent; 314/8 (48.4 overs) |
| Lewis Goldsworthy 87 (82); Matt Milnes 3/53 (10 overs) | | Daniel Bell-Drummond 100 (109); Lewis Goldsworthy 2/37 (7 overs) |

Kent won by 2 wickets
St Lawrence Ground, Canterbury
Umpires: Ben Debenham and Paul Pollard

- Kent won the toss and elected to field.
- Theo Lamey (Somerset) made his List A debut.

31 July 2026
11:00
Scorecard

| Northamptonshire Steelbacks; 246 (45.3 overs) | v | Leicestershire Foxes; 248/2 (38.5 overs) |
| George Bartlett 66 (71); Ian Holland 3/46 (9 overs) | | Rishi Patel 115 (61); Yuzvendra Chahal 1/28 (10 overs) |

Leicestershire Foxes won by 8 wickets
County Ground, Northampton
Umpires: Connor McGarry and Simon Widdup

- Northamptonshire Steelbacks won the toss and elected to bat.
- Tiaan Louw (Northamptonshire Steelbacks) made his List A debut.

31 July 2026
11:00
Scorecard

| Middlesex; 293/7 (50 overs) | v | Worcestershire Rapids; 294/6 (48.4 overs) |
| Josh de Caires 130 (147); Tom Taylor 2/47 (10 overs) | | Jake Libby 109* (114); Noah Cornwell 3/68 (10 overs) |

Worcestershire Rapids won by 4 wickets
New Road, Worcester
Umpires: Sam Hollingshead and Richard Illingworth

- Worcestershire Rapids won the toss and elected to field.

31 July 2026
11:00
Scorecard

| Durham; 165 (48.1 overs) | v | Yorkshire; 167/3 (41 overs) |
| Will Rhodes 31 (49); Ben Cliff 4/38 (9.1 overs) | | James Wharton 68* (122); Luke Robinson 1/23 (5 overs) |

Yorkshire won by 7 wickets
Clifton Park Ground, York
Umpires: Bilal Shafayat and Chris Watts

- Durham won the toss and elected to bat.

=== August ===
2 August 2026
11:00
Scorecard

| Derbyshire Falcons; 325/7 (50 overs) | v | Sussex Sharks; 137 (31.4 overs) |
| Wayne Madsen 104* (96); Henry Crocombe 3/44 (10 overs) | | Jack Leaning 25 (32); Jack Morley 5/28 (8.4 overs) |

Derbyshire Falcons won by 188 runs
County Ground, Derby
Umpires: Gareth Cross and Neil Pratt

- Derbyshire Falcons won the toss and elected to bat.

2 August 2026
11:00
Scorecard

| Essex; 376/5 (50 overs) | v | Worcestershire Rapids; 269 (41.3 overs) |
| Tom Westley 129 (104); Fateh Singh 2/68 (10 overs) | | Jake Libby 109 (100); Mackenzie Jones 3/47 (7 overs) |

Essex won by 107 runs
County Ground, Chelmsford
Umpires: Mike Burns and Graham Lloyd

- Essex won the toss and elected to bat.

2 August 2026
11:00
Scorecard

| Hampshire; 246 (50 overs) | v | Durham; 249/1 (38.3 overs) |
| Toby Albert 89 (108); Will Rhodes 3/29 (6 overs) | | Emilio Gay 104* (108); Felix Organ 1/68 (10 overs) |

Durham won by 9 wickets
Rose Bowl, Southampton
Umpires: Paul Pollard and Mohammed Waseem

- Hampshire won the toss and elected to bat.

2 August 2026
11:00
Scorecard

| Notts Outlaws; 293/9 (50 overs) | v | Kent; 294/5 (49.2 overs) |
| Ben Martindale 101 (112); Ekansh Singh 4/40 (8 overs) | | Harry Finch 88 (98); James Hayes 3/45 (10 overs) |

Kent won by 5 wickets
County Ground, Beckenham
Umpires: Sam Hollingshead and Nigel Llong

- Notts Outlaws won the toss and elected to bat.

2 August 2026
11:00
Scorecard

| Leicestershire Foxes; 289/8 (50 overs) | v | Somerset; 125 (30 overs) |
| Ben Cox 89 (80); Jake Ball 3/40 (9 overs) | | JT Langridge 32 (23); Alex Green 3/28 (6 overs) |

Leicestershire Foxes won by 164 runs
Grace Road, Leicester
Umpires: Anthony Harris and Phil Mustard

- Somerset won the toss and elected to field.

2 August 2026
11:00
Scorecard

| Middlesex; 246 (48 overs) | v | Yorkshire; 211 (47.3 overs) |
| Jack Nelson 76 (69); Ben Cliff 4/39 (8 overs) | | Will Bennison 63 (96); Zafar Gohar 4/24 (10 overs) |

Middlesex won by 35 runs
Lord's, London
Umpires: Paul Baldwin and Mark Newell

- Middlesex won the toss and elected to bat.

2 August 2026
11:00
Scorecard

| Northamptonshire Steelbacks; 347/6 (50 overs) | v | Lancashire; 280 (45.2 overs) |
| Gus Miller 115 (110); George Balderson 2/50 (10 overs) | | Joe Moores 85 (59); Yuzvendra Chahal 4/60 (9 overs) |

Northamptonshire Steelbacks won by 67 runs
County Ground, Northampton
Umpires: Steve O'Shaughnessy and Casper Viljoen

- Lancashire won the toss and elected to field.

2 August 2026
11:00
Scorecard

| Gloucestershire; 271/9 (50 overs) | v | Warwickshire; 277/4 (42 overs) |
| Ollie Price 122 (124); Jordan Thompson 3/47 (10 overs) | | Rob Yates 132 (123); Jack Taylor 1/22 (2 overs) |

Warwickshire won by 6 wickets
Rugby School Ground, Rugby
Umpires: Naeem Ashraf and Tom Lungley

- Gloucestershire won the toss and elected to bat.
- Ed Middleton (Gloucestershire) made his List A debut.

5 August 2026
11:00
Scorecard

| Hampshire; 263 (49.3 overs) | v | Glamorgan; 173 (40.4 overs) |
| Jake Lehmann 68 (78); Dan Douthwaite 3/38 (9.3 overs) | | Callum Nicholls 40 (52); Manny Lumsden 4/60 (9.4 overs) |

Hampshire won by 90 runs
Rose Bowl, Southampton
Umpires: Sue Redfern and Casper Viljoen

- Hampshire won the toss and elected to bat.
- Harry Wallace (Glamorgan) made his List A debut.

5 August 2026
11:00
Scorecard

| Surrey; 286 (48.3 overs) | v | Kent; 191 (41.5 overs) |
| Ryan Patel 73 (70); Matt Milnes 3/32 (10 overs) | | Jaydn Denly 51 (53); Tom Lawes 4/40 (8.5 overs) |

Surrey won by 95 runs
The Oval, London
Umpires: Connor McGarry and Jack Shantry

- Kent won the toss and elected to field.
- The match was reduced to 49 overs per side due to rain.

7 August 2026
13:30 (D/N)
Scorecard

| Durham; 303/7 (50 overs) | v | Middlesex; Joe Cracknell 84 (91) |
| Alex Lees 103 (116); Naavya Sharma 4/46 (10 overs) | | Ben Stokes 2/54 (7.3 overs) |

Middlesex won by 3 wickets
Riverside Ground, Chester-le-Street
Umpires: Bilal Shafayat and Mohammed Waseem

- Middlesex won the toss and elected to field.

7 August 2026
11:00
Scorecard

| Essex; 312 (47.1 overs) | v | Glamorgan; 309/7 (50 overs) |
| Luc Benkenstein 140 (109); Dan Douthwaite 3/57 (9 overs) | | Timm van der Gugten 118* (101); Shane Snater 3/42 (9 overs) |

Essex won by 3 runs
Sophia Gardens, Cardiff
Umpires: Jack Shantry and Mark Newell

- Glamorgan won the toss and elected to field.
- Timm van der Gugten (Glamorgan) scored his first century in List A cricket.

7 August 2026
11:00
Scorecard

| Gloucestershire; 270/6 (50 overs) | v | Lancashire; 273/6 (48.1 overs) |
| Cameron Bancroft 98 (119); George Balderson 2/54 (10 overs) | | Keaton Jennings 67 (87); Will Williams 2/44 (9 overs) |

Lancashire won by 4 wickets
Old Trafford, Manchester
Umpires: Paul Pollard and Phil Mustard

- Gloucestershire won the toss and elected to bat.

7 August 2026
14:00 (D/N)
Scorecard

| Warwickshire; 220 (46 overs) | v | Leicestershire Foxes; 222/7 (47.1 overs) |
| Kai Smith 57 (71); Ben Green 2/19 (8 overs) | | Nick Kelly 86 (104); Oliver Hannon-Dalby 3/27 (10 overs) |

Leicestershire Foxes won by 3 wickets
Grace Road, Leicester
Umpires: Paul Baldwin and Ben Peverall

- Warwickshire won the toss and elected to bat.

7 August 2026
11:00
Scorecard

| Northamptonshire Steelbacks; 259/8 (50 overs) | v | Notts Outlaws; 261/4 (46.4 overs) |
| George Bartlett 55 (54); James Hayes 2/51 (6 overs) | | Freddie McCann 91 (105); Liam Guthrie 2/52 (10 overs) |

Notts Outlaws won by 6 wickets
Queen's Park, Chesterfield
Umpires: David Millns and Sue Redfern

- Northamptonshire Steelbacks won the toss and elected to bat.

7 August 2026
14:00 (D/N)
Scorecard

| Somerset; 368/9 (50 overs) | v | Surrey; 180 (38.2 overs) |
| Tom Lammonby 114 (96); James Taylor 3/41 (10 overs) | | Josh Blake 47 (53); Jack Leach 3/29 (38.2 overs) |

Somerset won by 188 runs
County Ground, Taunton
Umpires: Martin Saggers and Surendiran Shanmugam

- Surrey won the toss and elected to field.

7 August 2026
14:00 (D/N)
Scorecard

| Sussex Sharks; 333/9 (50 overs) | v | Worcestershire Rapids; 334/6 (48.2 overs) |
| Fynn Hudson-Prentice 68 (35); Ben Gibbon 3/74 (10 overs) | | Jake Libby 109* (96); Jack Carson 2/60 (10 overs) |

Worcestershire Rapids won by 4 wickets
County Ground, Hove
Umpires: Ben Debenham and Sam Hollingshead

- Worcestershire Rapids won the toss and elected to field.
- George O'Connor (Worcestershire Rapids) made his List A debut.

7 August 2026
11:00
Scorecard

| Derbyshire Falcons; 278/8 (50 overs) | v | Yorkshire; 281/5 (49.2 overs) |
| Martin Andersson 67 (81); Ben Cliff 3/57 (9 overs) | | Sam Whiteman 94 (98); Nick Potts 3/78 (10 overs) |

Yorkshire won by 5 wickets
North Marine Road Ground, Scarborough
Umpires: Connor McGarry and James Middlebrook

- Yorkshire won the toss and elected to field.

9 August 2026
11:00
Scorecard

| Middlesex; 327/6 (50 overs) | v | Derbyshire Falcons; 240 (43.5 overs) |
| Ben Geddes 109 (93); Jack Morley 2/58 (10 overs) | | Caleb Jewell 54 (69); Zafar Gohar 3/35 (9.5 overs) |

Middlesex won by 87 runs
County Ground, Derby
Umpires: James Middlebrook and Sue Redfern

- Derbyshire Falcons won the toss and elected to field.

9 August 2026
11:00
Scorecard

| Durham; 229/5 (38 overs) | v | Essex; 209 (37.1 overs) |
| Colin Ackermann 80* (85); Jamie Porter 2/42 (8 overs) | | Noah Thain 76 (83); James Minto 3/45 (5 overs) |

Durham won by 20 runs
Feethams, Darlington
Umpires: Naeem Ashraf and Neil Pratt

- Essex won the toss and elected to field.
- The match was reduced to 38 overs per side due to rain.

9 August 2026
11:00
Scorecard

| Worcestershire Rapids; 278/9 (50 overs) | v | Glamorgan; 281/8 (50 overs) |
| Jake Libby 105 (114); Zain-ul-Hassan 4/58 (10 overs) | | Callum Nicholls 70 (91); Ben Allison 2/55 (10 overs) |

Glamorgan won by 2 wickets
Sophia Gardens, Cardiff
Umpires: Gareth Cross and Ben Peverall

- Worcestershire Rapids won the toss and elected to bat.

9 August 2026
11:00
Scorecard

| Notts Outlaws; 279 (48.3 overs) | v | Gloucestershire; 282/6 (49.1 overs) |
| Haseeb Hameed 85 (93); Kyle Verreynne 85 (81); Aman Rao 4/44 (9.3 overs) | | James Bracey 103 (85); Brett Hutton 3/30 (10 overs) |

Gloucestershire won by 4 wickets
College Ground, Cheltenham
Umpires: Ian Blackwell and Chris Watts

- Gloucestershire won the toss and elected to field.
- Alfie Johnson (Gloucestershire) made his List A debut.

9 August 2026
11:00
Scorecard

| Leicestershire Foxes; 261/7 (50 overs) | v | Kent; 262/4 (47.3 overs) |
| Hamza Shaikh 93 (116); Matt Parkinson 2/27 (10 overs) | | Daniel Bell-Drummond 133* (126); Alex Green 1/29 (7 overs) |

Kent won by 6 wickets
County Ground, Beckenham
Umpires: Ben Debenham and Bilal Shafayat

- Leicestershire Foxes won the toss and elected to bat.

9 August 2026
11:00
Scorecard

| Somerset; 185 (47 overs) | v | Northamptonshire Steelbacks; 189/3 (30 overs) |
| Tom Lammonby 40 (51); Rob Keogh 4/35 (10 overs) | | Luke Procter 85 (76); Jake Ball 1/17 (4 overs) |

Northamptonshire Steelbacks won by 7 wickets
County Ground, Northampton
Umpires: Anthony Harris and Rob White

- Somerset won the toss and elected to bat.

9 August 2026
11:00
Scorecard

| Hampshire; 383/9 (50 overs) | v | Sussex Sharks; 332 (48.5 overs) |
| Ben Mayes 109 (115); Ollie Robinson 3/46 (10 overs) | | Charlie Tear 111 (94); Eddie Jack 4/58 (9 overs) |

Hampshire won by 51 runs
County Ground, Hove
Umpires: Nigel Llong and James Tredwell

- Hampshire won the toss and elected to bat.

9 August 2026
11:00
Scorecard

| Lancashire; 311/5 (50 overs) | v | Warwickshire; 314/8 (48.5 overs) |
| Marcus Harris 89 (90); Michael Booth 2/55 (7 overs) | | Vansh Jani 88 (71); Jack Blatherwick 3/79 (10 overs) |

Warwickshire won by 2 wickets
Rugby School Ground, Rugby
Umpires: Martin Saggers and Simon Widdup

- Warwickshire won the toss and elected to field.

11 August 2026
11:00
Scorecard

| Essex; 151 (40.2 overs) | v | Yorkshire; 155/3 (31.4 overs) |
| Matt Critchley 45* (57); Ben Coad 2/14 (5.2 overs) | | Will Bennison 60 (59); Mackenzie Jones 2/30 (6 overs) |

Yorkhsire won by 7 wickets
County Ground, Chelmsford
Umpires: David Millns and Bilal Shafayat

- Essex won the toss and elected to bat.

11 August 2026
11:00
Scorecard

| Northamptonshire Steelbacks; 308 (46.4 overs) | v | Gloucestershire; 309/7 (49.2 overs) |
| Nathan McSweeney 79 (63); Daaryoush Ahmed 4/56 (10 overs) | | Joseph Eckland 68* (74); Dom Leech 3/59 (10 overs) |

Gloucestershire won by 3 wickets
College Ground Cheltenham
Umpires: Sam Hollingshead and Steve O'Shaughnessy

- Gloucestershire won the toss and elected to field.

11 August 2026
11:00
Scorecard

| Derbyshire Falcons; 317/5 (50 overs) | v | Hampshire; 309 (39.2 overs) |
| Martin Andersson 125 (129); Tom Prest 4/73 (10 overs) | | Andrew Neal 110 (63); Luis Reece 3/28 (5.2 overs) |

Derbyshire Falcons won by 8 runs
Rose Bowl, Southampton
Umpires: Ian Blackwell and Ben Peverall

- Hampshire won the toss and elected to field.

11 August 2026
11:00
Scorecard

| Middlesex; 354/8 (50 overs) | v | Sussex Sharks; 262 (43.5 overs) |
| Joe Cracknell 128 (112); Toby Munt 4/90 (9 overs) | | John Simpson 65 (60); Sebastian Morgan 4/46 (8.5 overs) |

Middlesex won by 92 runs
Brunton Memorial Ground, Radlett
Umpires: Phil Mustard and James Tredwell

- Sussex Sharks won the toss and elected to field.

11 August 2026
11:00
Scorecard

| Lancashire; 443/6 (50 overs) | v | Somerset; 269 (39.2 overs) |
| Keaton Jennings 156 (127); Archie Vaughan 2/49 (10 overs) | | Tom Lammonby 68 (58); Tom Aspinwall 4/42 (8.2 overs) |

Lancashire won by 174 runs
County Ground, Taunton
Umpires: Hassan Adnan and Anthony Harris

- Somerset won the toss and elected to field.
- Rocky Flintoff (Lancashire) scored his maiden century in List A cricket.
- Lancashire's total was the club's highest in List A cricket.

11 August 2026
11:00
Scorecard

| Surrey; 298/8 (50 overs) | v | Notts Outlaws; 299/4 (47.5 overs) |
| Ryan Patel 102 (91); Dillon Pennington 4/54 (10 overs) | | George Munsey 138 (132); James Taylor 2/70 (9.5 overs) |

Notts Outlaws won by 6 wickets
The Oval, London
Umpires: Tom Lungley and Martin Saggers

- Surrey won the toss and elected to bat.

11 August 2026
11:00
Scorecard

| Warwickshire; 263 (45.1 overs) | v | Kent; 176 (33.4 overs) |
| Vansh Jani 98 (85); Matt Milnes 4/52 (10 overs) | | Grant Stewart 41 (34); Ethan Bamber 4/29 (7 overs) |

Warwickshire won by 87 runs
Rugby School Ground, Rugby
Umpires: Connor McGarry and Mohammed Waseem

- Kent won the toss and elected to field.

11 August 2026
11:00
Scorecard

| Worcestershire Rapids; 291 (49.1 overs) | v | Durham; 214 (38.5 overs) |
| Tom Taylor 86 (74); Kasey Aldridge 3/18 (7.1 overs) | | Ben McKinney 82 (70); Ben Allison 3/58 (8.5 overs) |

Worcestershire Rapids won by 77 runs
New Road, Worcester
Umpires: Gareth Cross and Michael Gough

- Durham won the toss and elected to field.

== Knockout stage ==
=== Bracket ===
Quarter-finals
B2 | Yorkshire | 273/9 (50 overs)
A3 | Notts Outlaws | 277/7 (48.4 overs)
A2 | Lancashire | 187 (36.1 overs)
B3 | Durham | 349/8 (50 overs)

Semi-finals
A1 | Leicestershire Foxes | 303/7 (50 overs)
QF2 | Notts Outlaws | 280 (49 overs)
B1 | Middlesex | 255/8 (48.4 overs)
QF1 | Durham | 254/7 (50 overs)

Final
SF1 | Leicestershire Foxes | 200 (44.2 overs)
SF2 | Middlesex | 231 (49.5 overs)

=== Quarter-finals ===
14 August 2026
11:00
Scorecard

| Durham; 349/8 (50 overs) | v | Lancashire; 187 (36.1 overs) |
| David Bedingham 104 (89); George Balderson 2/45 (10 overs) | | Joe Moores 51 (42); Shafiqullah Ghafari 4/36 (5.1 overs) |

Durham won by 162 runs
Old Trafford, Manchester
Umpires: Hassan Adnan and David Millns

- Durham won the toss and elected to bat.

14 August 2026
11:00
Scorecard

| Yorkshire; 273/9 (50 overs) | v | Notts Outlaws; 277/7 (48.4 overs) |
| Will Bennison 91 (115); Dillon Pennington 4/49 (10 overs) | | Jack Haynes 116* (99); Ben Coad 5/52 (10 overs) |

Notts Outlaws won by 3 wickets
Clifton Park Ground, York
Umpires: Jack Shantry and Chris Watts

- Notts Outlaws won the toss and elected to field.

=== Semi-finals ===
16 August 2026
11:00
Scorecard

| Leicestershire Foxes; 303/7 (50 overs) | v | Notts Outlaws; 280 (49 overs) |
| Hamza Shaikh 104 (109); Dillon Pennington 3/65 (9 overs) | | Freddie McCann 64 (83); Alex Green 4/40 (6 overs) |

Leicestershire Foxes won by 23 runs
Grace Road, Leicester
Umpires: James Middlebrook and Mark Newell

- Notts Outlaws won the toss and elected to field.

16 August 2026
11:00
Scorecard

| Durham; 254/7 (50 overs) | v | Middlesex; 255/8 (48.4 overs) |
| Will Rhodes 80 (93); Luke Hollman 3/53 (10 overs) | | Luke Hollman 83* (100); Colin Ackermann 3/46 (10 overs) |

Middlesex won by 2 wickets
Brunton Memorial Ground, Radlett
Umpires: Mike Burns and Nigel Llong

- Durham won the toss and elected to bat

=== Final ===
20 September 2026
11:00 (D/N)
Scorecard

| Leicestershire Foxes; 200 (49.5 overs) | v | Middlesex; 231 (44.2 overs) |
| Ryan Higgins 100 (115); Ian Holland 5/36 (10 overs) | | Nick Kelly 103 (107); Toby Roland-Jones 3/27 (10 overs) |

Middlesex won by 31 runs
Trent Bridge, Nottingham
Umpires: Tom Lungley and Ben Debenham
Player of the match: Ryan Higgins (Middlesex)

- Leicestershire won the toss and elected to field.
- Ryan Higgins (Middlesex) scored his first century in List A cricket.
