= Savin Perera =

English cricketer

Personal information
- Full name: Savin Dilusha Perera
- Born: 3 May 1999 (age 27); Colombo, Sri Lanka
- Batting: Left-handed
- Bowling: Right-arm off break

Domestic team information
- Years: Team
- 2016–2018: Middlesex
- 2019–2022: Berkshire
- 2026: Somerset (squad no. 11)
- List A debut: 21 July 2026 Somerset v Nottinghamshire

Career statistics
Competition	List A
Matches	6
Runs scored	198
Batting average	33.00
100s/50s	0/2
Top score	75
Catches/stumpings	0/–
- Source: Cricinfo, 11 August 2026

Savin Dilusha Perera (born 3 May 1999) is an English cricketer who represented Somerset County Cricket Club in the 2026 One-Day Cup. Primarily an opening batsman, he is a left handed batsman and a right arm off break bowler.

== Personal life ==
Perera was born in Colombo, Sri Lanka before moving to the UK aged 13 where he joined the cricket academy at Middlesex County Cricket Club. His brother Dinesh is also a keen cricketer.

== Career ==
Perera scored half centuries against Namibia and South Africa in his first 2 matches for England under-19s. Perera opened the batting for England at the 2018 Under-19 Cricket World Cup alongside Tom Banton in the side captained by Harry Brook.

Perera marked his debut in the National Counties Cricket Championship for Berkshire County Cricket Club in 2019 with a century, scoring exactly 100 against Herefordshire. He also scored 82 against Hertfordshire on his limited overs debut for Berkshire.

Unfortunately, no competitive cricket was played in 2020 but in 2021 Perera scored 121 not out against Wiltshire, and 72 not out from 68 balls against Buckinghamshire, and then in September 2021 Perera top scored with 84 as Berkshire secured a 151-run victory over Cumbria to win the final of the National Counties Trophy. Perera also played league cricket for Attenborough CC in the Nottinghamshire Premier League and was named NPL player of the season in 2021.

Perera opened the 2022 season for Berkshire with a century against Dorset, and also scored 84 in 85 balls against Devon County Cricket Club. In July 2022 Perera joined the South Asian Cricket Academy and scored two half centuries against Northants second XI and a century against Surrey second XI in his first two matches for them. Perera then scored a century playing for Glamorgan second XI against Gloucestershire second XI on 4 July 2022, without being offered a professional contract by the county.

Perera played two second XI County Championship matches for Somerset County Cricket Club in 2026, scoring 282 runs at an average of 70.50 with a best score of 113, and was included in the county’s squad for the 2026 One-Day Cup.

== Style of play ==
Perera is a left handed opening batsman and has been described as being compact in technique with a particular strength striking the ball square of the wicket.
