= Farington Cricket Ground =

Cricket ground in Farington, Lancashire, England

Coordinates: 53°43′1″N 2°41′16″W

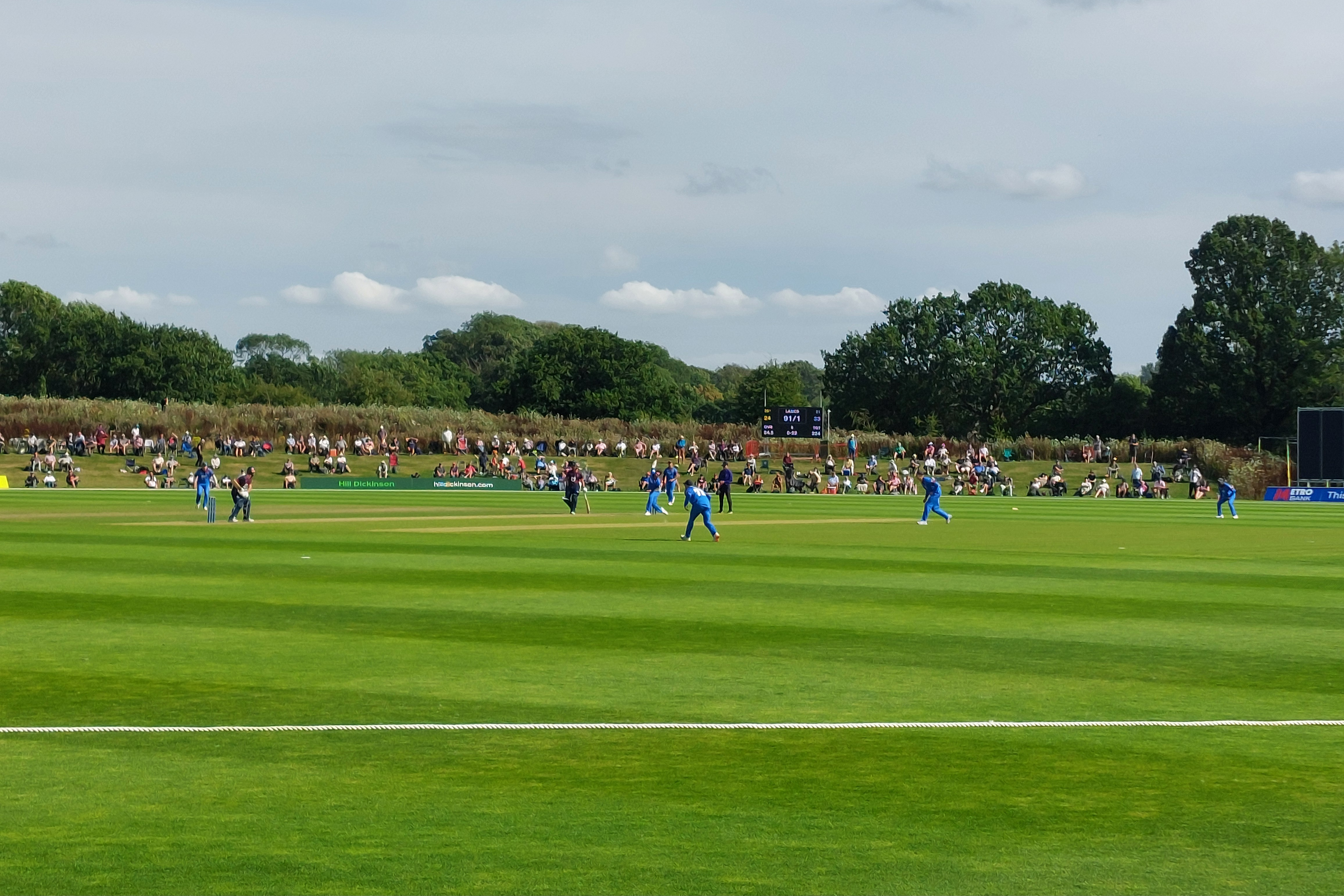
- Lancashire v Kent, 28 July 2026
- Interactive map of Farington Cricket Ground

Ground information
- Location: Farington, Lancashire; England
- Country: England
- Establishment: 2026; 0 years ago
- Capacity: 5,000 (700 fixed seats)
- Tenants: Lancashire County Cricket Club
- Website: cricket.lancashirecricket.co.uk/club/ao-farington-cricket-ground/
- End names
- Lostock Hall End; Fowler Lane End

Team information
Lancashire	(2026 – present)
- As of 29 July 2026; Source: ESPNcricinfo

Farington Cricket Ground, known as AO Farington Cricket Ground for sponsorship reasons, is a cricket ground in Farington, Lancashire, England. It opened in 2026 as a second base for Lancashire County Cricket Club.

== Planning and construction ==
Lancashire County Cricket Club (LCCC) first announced its plans to begin operating from a second base in the county in December 2021, citing the volume of both domestic and international matches played at its home ground, Old Trafford, among the reasons for requiring such a facility. Plans for the new ground included two full-size cricket pitches, along with a pavilion and training facilities, and it was announced as having an intended capacity of 5,000 spectators. A plot of land in Farington owned by Lancashire County Council was identified as being suitable. Architects BDP drew up plans for the venue, including the planting of 200 new trees alongside native plant species. The design was loosely based on the layout of the Hagley Oval in Christchurch, New Zealand. Planning permission was obtained from the county council in March 2023; however, as the land was designated as green belt, permission also had to be sought from the Secretary of State for Levelling Up, Housing and Communities, Michael Gove, before construction could begin.

Building work on the new ground commenced in November 2023 with a turf-cutting ceremony attended by officials of the cricket club and the county council. The landscaping work requiring the removal of 50,000 cubic metres of topsoil—46,000 of which were reused around the site—was undertaken by a local company, Eric Wright Construction. The first of the two pitches was completed by December 2024, with construction of the pavilion beginning in early 2025. Work was officially completed in February 2026 at a total cost of around £20 million, with LCCC taking control of the site on a 250-year lease. Upon the site's official opening in July 2026, the club announced a 10-year agreement with electricals retailer AO World that includes naming rights for the cricket ground. On 28 July 2026, Farington hosted its first senior match as Lancashire's men's team defeated Kent by 6 wickets in the One-Day Cup.

== Facilities ==
Farington Cricket Ground has two full-sized cricket ovals, one of which is built to Test standard and reserved for professional use, while the second is for youth and recreational cricket. As part of the funding agreement with Lancashire County Council for the site, the second pitch will be available for community use for 750 hours each year. As well as being used for LCCC matches, Farington is also intended to become a "centre of excellence" for women's cricket in north-west England, and a regional development centre for cricketers with disabilities. In 2025, the UK Government announced funding for an indoor cricket "dome" to be built at the site, allowing the sport to be played at all times of the year. There are also training facilities for the men's and women's senior teams, gym facilities, and a pavilion which is also available for private events.

The nearest railway station to Farington Cricket Ground is Lostock Hall on the East Lancashire Line. Leyland railway station is around a 35-minute walk from the ground and has direct rail connections to Manchester and Blackpool. The ground is accessible by road, being located close to the junction of the M6 and M65 motorways. It is also served by a local bus service, the 111 from Leyland to Tanterton.
