= Naavya Sharma =

English cricketer (born 2008)

Personal information
- Born: 10 September 2005 (age 21); Isleworth, London
- Batting: Right-handed
- Bowling: Right-arm medium fast
- Role: Bowler

Domestic team information
- Years: Team
- 2025–2026: Middlesex (squad no. 2)
- FC debut: 16 May 2025 Middlesex v Leicestershire
- LA debut: 21 July 2026 Middlesex v Essex

Career statistics
Competition	FC	LA	T20
Matches	13	10	9
Runs scored	60	3	4
Batting average	6.00	1.50	4.00
100s/50s	0/0	0/0	0/0
Top score	18	1	2*
Balls bowled	1,824	474	192
Wickets	45	23	11
Bowling average	23.11	16.86	23.72
5 wickets in innings	0	0	0
10 wickets in match	0	0	0
Best bowling	4/17	4/29	4/19
Catches/stumpings	3/–	4/–	2/–
- Source: ESPNcricinfo, 8 November 2026

Naavya Sharma (born 10 September 2005) is an English cricketer who plays for Middlesex County Cricket Club and has represented England at under-19 level. He is a right-handed batsman and right-arm medium fast bowler.

Born in Isleworth, he attended Hampton School in London. He signed a first professional contract with Middlesex County Cricket Club in October 2024. He made his first class cricket debut for Middlesex on 16 May 2025 against Leicestershire. The following month he took career best figures of 4/43 in the first innings against then Division 2 league leaders Leicestershire. On 20 September 2026, he took the final wicket as Middlesex won the 2026 One-Day Cup final against Leicestershire. He had been the leading wicket taker for Middlesex throughout the competition. He also finished the County Championship season with 37 wickets at an average of 21.64.

Sharma took figures of 5.44 playing for the England national under-19 cricket team against Sri Lanka U19 in July 2024.

Sharma made his England Lions debut against South Africa A on 29 May 2026.

He was named the 2026 Cricket Media Club Young Cricketer of the Year.
