= Fateh Singh (cricketer) =

English cricketer (born 2004)

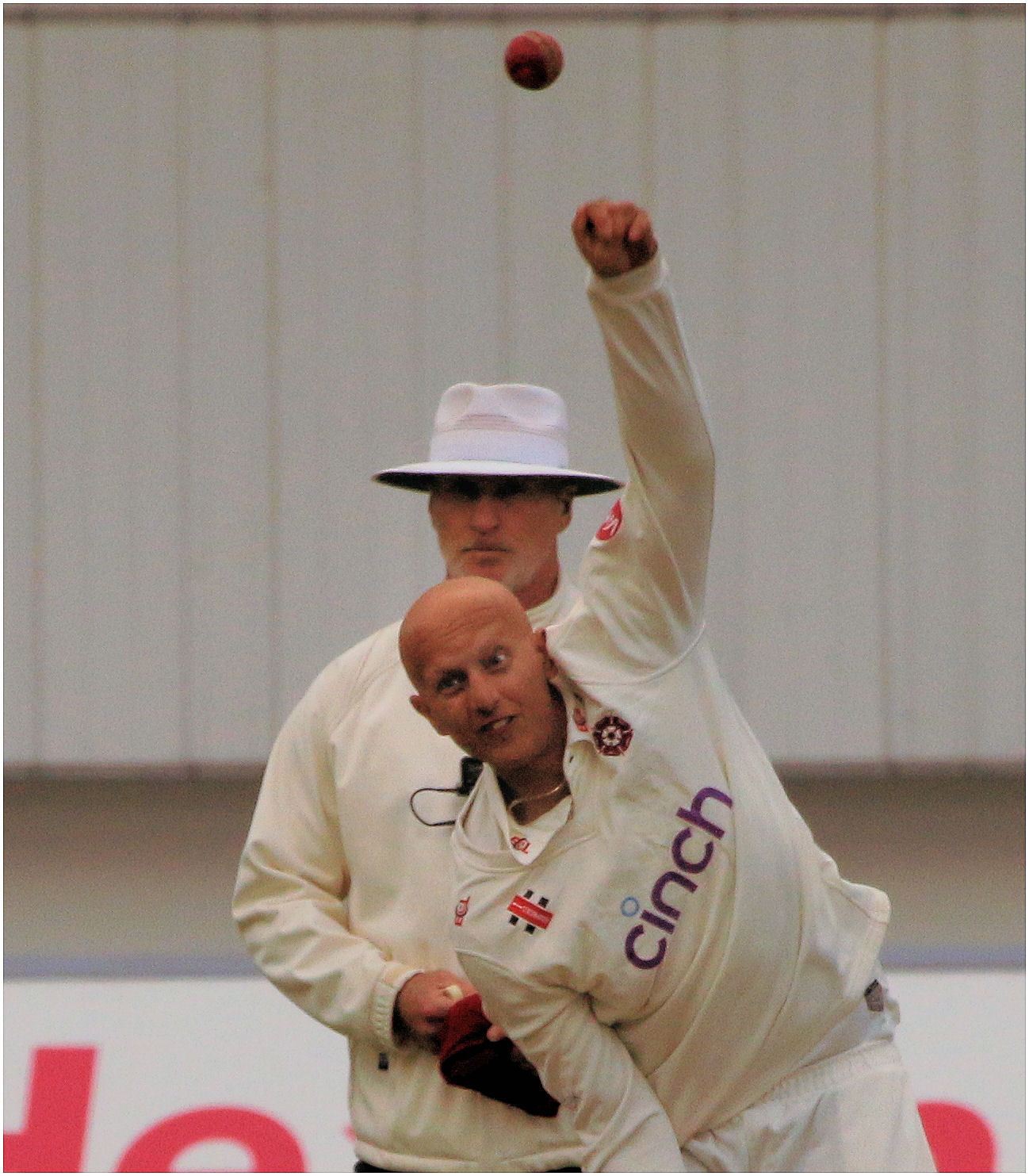
- Singh in 2024

Personal information
- Full name: Fateh Singh
- Born: 20 April 2004 (age 22); Nottingham, Nottinghamshire, England
- Batting: Left-handed
- Bowling: Slow left-arm orthodox

Domestic team information
- Years: Team
- 2021–2024: Nottinghamshire (squad no. 98)
- 2024: → Worcestershire (on loan)
- 2024: → Northamptonshire (on loan)
- 2025–2026: Worcestershire (squad no. 7)
- FC debut: 27 September 2024 Northamptonshire v Yorkshire
- LA debut: 6 August 2021 Nottinghamshire v Yorkshire

Career statistics
| Competition | FC | LA | T20 |
|---|---|---|---|
| Matches | 8 | 34 | 17 |
| Runs scored | 128 | 322 | 26 |
| Batting average | 16.00 | 18.94 | 6.50 |
| 100s/50s | 0/0 | 0/1 | 0/0 |
| Top score | 26* | 60 | 10 |
| Balls bowled | 959 | 1,439 | 296 |
| Wickets | 17 | 46 | 16 |
| Bowling average | 37.23 | 30.56 | 23.75 |
| 5 wickets in innings | 1 | 1 | 0 |
| 10 wickets in match | 0 | 0 | 0 |
| Best bowling | 5/74 | 6/32 | 3/17 |
| Catches/stumpings | 4/– | 7/– | 3/– |
- Source: Cricinfo, 27 September 2026

Fateh Singh (born 20 April 2004) is an English cricketer. He made his List A debut on 6 August 2021, for Nottinghamshire in the 2021 Royal London One-Day Cup. In December 2021, he was named in England's team for the 2022 ICC Under-19 Cricket World Cup in the West Indies. Singh joined Northamptonshire on loan in September 2024, going on to make his first-class debut for the club against Yorkshire in the County Championship. He left Nottinghamshire to join Worcestershire on a three-year contract in November 2024.
