= Noah Thain =

English cricketer (born 2005)

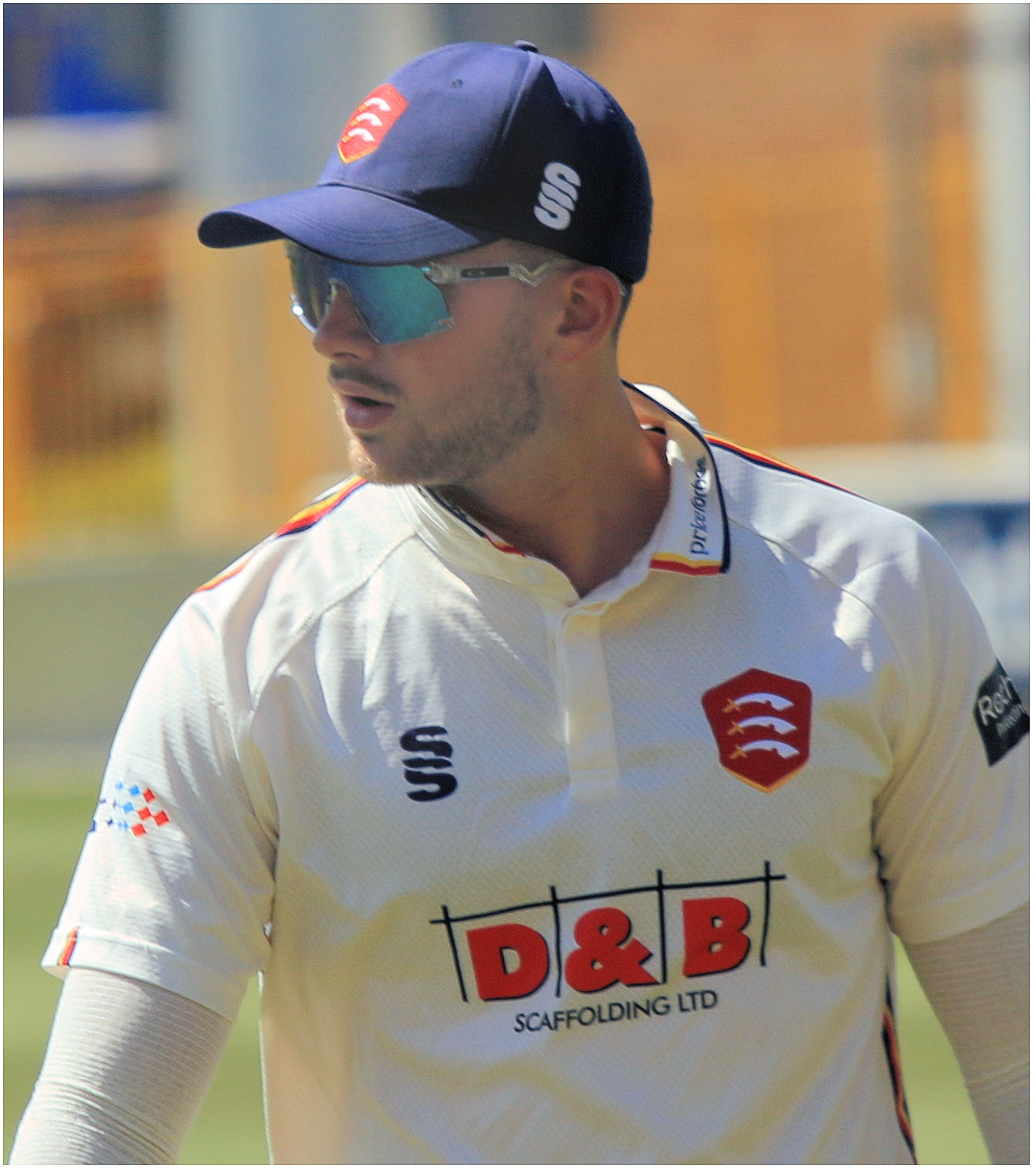
- Thain in 2025

Personal information
- Full name: Noah Robin Mostyn Thain
- Born: 13 January 2005 (age 21); Hitchinbrooke, Hertfordshire, England
- Batting: Right-handed
- Bowling: Right-arm medium
- Role: All-rounder

Domestic team information
- Years: Team
- 2023–present: Essex (squad no. 8)
- FC debut: 26 May 2023 Essex v Irish
- LA debut: 1 August 2023 Essex v Lancashire

Career statistics
Competition	FC	LA	T20
Matches	25	27	18
Runs scored	655	1,019	153
Batting average	21.12	42.45	21.85
100s/50s	0/4	2/8	0/0
Top score	64	109	38
Balls bowled	1,363	438	60
Wickets	20	5	4
Bowling average	54.60	104.20	24.75
5 wickets in innings	0	0	0
10 wickets in match	0	0	0
Best bowling	3/96	1/24	3/11
Catches/stumpings	7/–	10/–	10/–
- Source: ESPNcricinfo, 27 September 2026

Noah Robin Mostyn Thain (born 13 January 2005) is an English cricketer who plays for Essex and Essex 2nd XI. and the England national under-19 cricket team. He is a right-handed batsman, who also bowls right-arm medium-fast pace. He has played in both Youth One Day Internationals (ODIs) and Youth Tests for England national under-19 cricket team.

== Early life and education ==
He attended King's College School and The Leys School, both in Cambridge, and played for Sawston & Babraham Cricket Club in Cambridgeshire, the East Anglian Premier Cricket League Champions in 2021 and 2022. Thain has been a part of the Essex County Cricket Academy since 2021.

== Career ==
He made his first-class cricket debut against Ireland on 26 May 2023 in a tour match. Thain made his List A debut against Lancashire on 1 August 2023. A good striker of the ball, he made his T20 debut against Sussex on 13 June 2025 at Hove.

Thain has had notable performances for England national under-19 cricket team, including scoring back-to-back half-centuries against Sri Lanka in Youth ODIs and was part of the England U19 squad for 2024 World cup in South Africa.

He signed his first rookie contract with the Essex County Cricket club in summer 2023 followed by a two year full professional contract until the end of 2026 in 2024 .

In the 2025 season, he kept a regular place in the Essex team for the County Championship, typically batting at seven and being used as the fourth seam bowler. His returns were relatively modest but sufficient to keep his place in the team.

Thain agreed a three-year contract extension with Essex in July 2026, tying him into the club until at least the end of the 2029 season.
