= James Hayes (cricketer) =

English cricketer (born 2001)

Personal information
- Full name: James Phillip Henry Hayes
- Born: 27 June 2001 (age 25); Haywards Heath, West Sussex, England
- Batting: Right-handed
- Bowling: Right-arm fast-medium
- Role: Bowler

Domestic team information
- Years: Team
- 2021–2026: Nottinghamshire (squad no. 35)
- 2025: → Sussex (loan) (squad no. 32)
- 2026: → Gloucestershire (loan) (squad no. 13)
- FC debut: 9 May 2025 Sussex v Worcestershire
- LA debut: 12 August 2022 Nottinghamshire v Middlesex

Career statistics
Competition	FC	LA	T20
Matches	5	17	4
Runs scored	54	29	0
Batting average	13.50	14.50	–
100s/50s	0/0	0/0	0/0
Top score	33*	11	0*
Balls bowled	414	721	64
Wickets	2	25	6
Bowling average	161.00	31.84	18.50
5 wickets in innings	0	0	0
10 wickets in match	0	0	0
Best bowling	1/40	4/63	3/23
Catches/stumpings	1/–	3/–	1/–
- Source: Cricinfo, 12 September 2026

James Phillip Henry Hayes (born 27 June 2001) is an English cricketer who plays for Gloucestershire. He is a right-handed batsman and a right arm medium-fast pace bowler.

== Career ==
Hayes attended Whitgift School and King’s College, Taunton. He was in the squad at Somerset until he was waylaid by a back injury. He joined the Darren Lehmann Cricket Academy in Adelaide in the winter of 2020 where he was coached by former Australian test bowler Shaun Tait. He returned to England in March 2020 two days before the country went into lockdown because of the COVID-19 pandemic which severely truncated the cricket season. The following year, after a successful trial, Hayes was brought in to play Second XI cricket with Notts in 2021. On 23 June 2021, Hayes was given a professional contract with Notts until the end of the 2022 summer.

Hayes made his List A debut for Notts on 12 August 2022, against Middlesex at Grantham. He took 2/58, the best bowling figures for Notts on the day. He signed a new two-year contract with Nottinghamshire in September 2022 and a further two-year deal in October 2024.

Having joined Sussex on a short-term loan deal, Hayes made his first-class debut for the club against Worcestershire on 9 May 2025.

After two loan spells at Gloucestershire during the 2026 season, Hayes joined the club on a permanent basis in September that year on a two-year contract.
