= Alex Green (cricketer) =

English cricketer (born 2007)

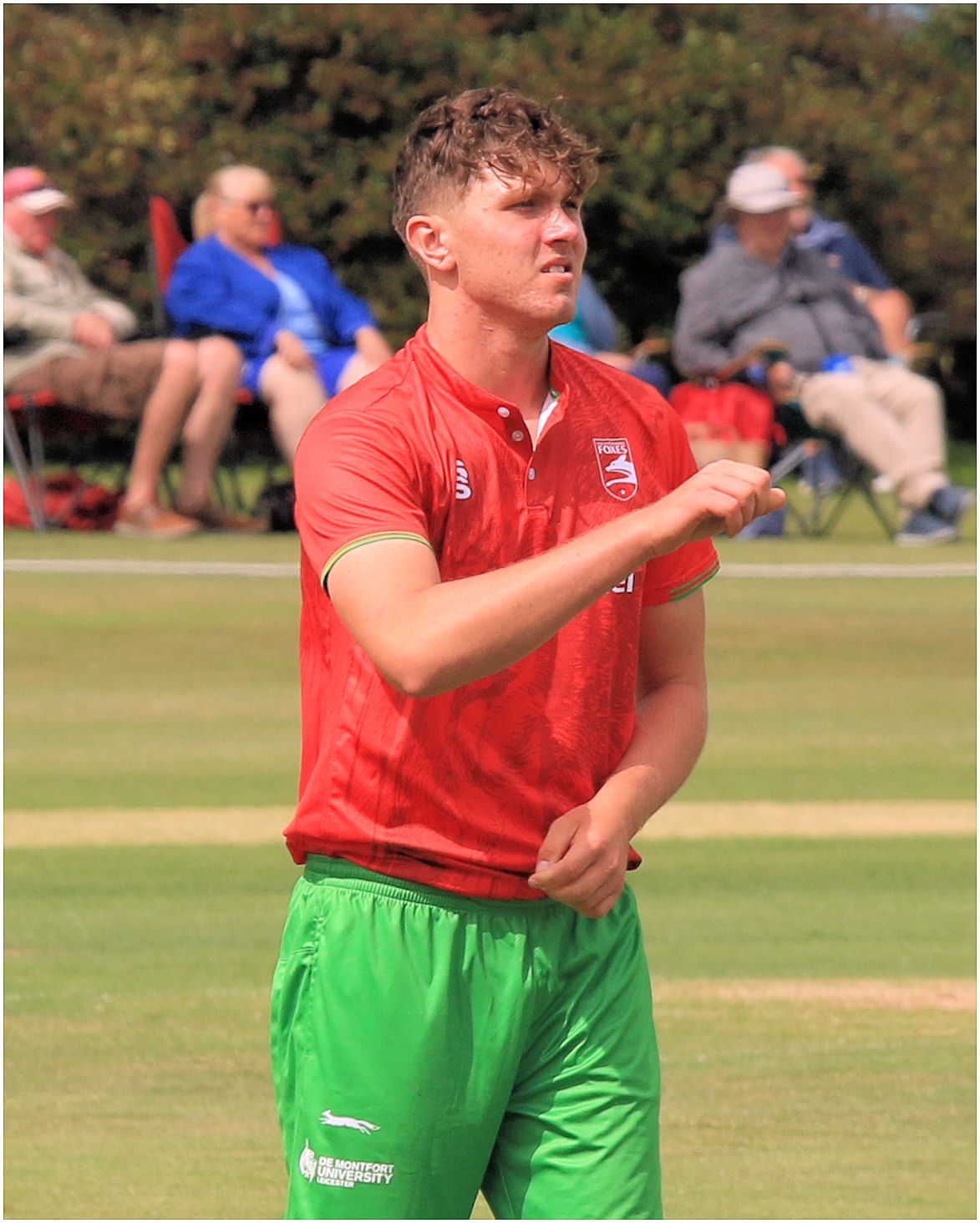
- Green in 2024

Personal information
- Full name: Alex Matthew Green
- Born: 24 February 2007 (age 19); Peterborough, Cambridgeshire, England
- Height: 6 ft 6 in (1.98 m)
- Batting: Right-handed
- Bowling: Right-arm medium-fast
- Role: Bowler

Domestic team information
- Years: Team
- 2024–present: Leicestershire (squad no. 43)
- FC debut: 26 September 2024 Leicestershire v Derbyshire
- List A debut: 8 August 2024 Leicestershire v Yorkshire

Career statistics
Competition	FC	LA	T20
Matches	5	19	8
Runs scored	9	26	2
Batting average	4.50	13.00	0.66
100s/50s	0/0	0/0	0/0
Top score	9*	21	2
Balls bowled	413	865	150
Wickets	8	40	7
Bowling average	41.12	21.92	31.85
5 wickets in innings	0	3	0
10 wickets in match	0	0	0
Best bowling	3/61	5/25	2/18
Catches/stumpings	0/–	3/–	1/–
Medal record
Men's cricket
Representing England
ICC U19 World Cup
Runner-up	2026 Zimbabwe & Namibia
- Source: Cricinfo, 26 September 2026

Alex Matthew Green (born 24 February 2007) is an English cricketer who plays for Leicestershire County Cricket Club and England men's U19. He is a right handed right arm fast bowler and right handed batter.

== Career ==
In 2023, he played for Young Lions. On 8 August 2024, he made his List A debut against Yorkshire in the 2024 One-Day Cup. He took two wickets (2/65) on his List A debut. He signed a professional contract with Leicestershire in September 2024. In the same month he was selected to England national under-19 cricket team for the ODI Tri-Series against Scotland Men U19s and Ireland Men U19s. He took five-wicket haul (5/50) against Scotland under-19 team in that tournament. He made his first-class debut for Leicestershire against Derbyshire in the 2024 County Championship on 26 September 2024.
