= Sean Hunt =

English cricketer (born 2001)

Personal information
- Full name: Sean Frank Hunt
- Born: 7 December 2001 (age 24); Guildford, Surrey, England
- Batting: Right-handed
- Bowling: Left-arm fast-medium
- Role: Bowler

Domestic team information
- Years: Team
- 2021–present: Sussex (squad no. 21)
- First-class debut: 8 April 2021 Sussex v Lancashire
- List A debut: 2 August 2022 Sussex v Nottinghamshire

Career statistics
Competition	FC	LA	T20
Matches	32	14	7
Runs scored	285	64	1
Batting average	10.55	12.80	1.00
100s/50s	0/1	0/0	0/0
Top score	65	13	1*
Balls bowled	4,386	648	158
Wickets	89	17	8
Bowling average	30.01	37.70	28.25
5 wickets in innings	2	0	0
10 wickets in match	0	0	0
Best bowling	5/48	3/35	3/9
Catches/stumpings	8/–	2/–	3/–
- Source: Cricinfo, 26 September 2026

Sean Frank Hunt (born 7 December 2001) is an English professional cricketer who plays for Sussex. Hunt is a right-handed batsman and a left-arm fast-medium bowler.

Hunt played his junior cricket at Horsley and Send Cricket Club in Surrey. Developing his skills through the youth and adult teams, he later moved to Ashtead Cricket Club in 2020.

From Guildford, Hunt was Surrey's academy player of the year in 2019. Hunt switched to Sussex from Surrey in January 2021 and spent time in the winter in Australia with the Darren Lehmann Cricket Academy in Adelaide and playing grade cricket for West Torrens CC.

He made his first-class debut on 8 April 2021, the opening day of the 2021 County Championship as Sussex played Lancashire at Old Trafford.

In June 2025, Hunt agreed a new contract with Sussex tying him into the club until at least the end of the 2027 season.
