= Adam Thomas (cricketer) =

English cricketer (born 2006)

Personal information
- Full name: Adam Roger George Thomas
- Born: 6 July 2006 (age 20)
- Batting: Right-handed
- Bowling: Right-arm medium

Domestic team information
- Years: Team
- 2024–present: Surrey (squad no. 64)
- FC debut: 2 May 2026 Surrey v Sussex
- LA debut: 9 August 2024 Surrey v Essex

Career statistics
| Competition | FC | LA | T20 |
|---|---|---|---|
| Matches | 10 | 18 | 4 |
| Runs scored | 435 | 587 | 44 |
| Batting average | 29.00 | 39.13 | 22.00 |
| 100s/50s | 1/0 | 1/3 | 0/0 |
| Top score | 120 | 162 | 32 |
| Balls bowled | 500 | 234 | – |
| Wickets | 3 | 4 | – |
| Bowling average | 102.33 | 54.50 | – |
| 5 wickets in innings | 0 | 0 | – |
| 10 wickets in match | 0 | 0 | – |
| Best bowling | 2/74 | 2/35 | – |
| Catches/stumpings | 17/– | 7/– | 3/– |
- Source: ESPNcricinfo, 27 September 2026

Adam Roger George Thomas (born 6 July 2006) is an English cricketer who plays for Surrey. He is a right-handed batsman and right arm medium fast bowler. He made his List-A debut on 9 August 2024 against Essex. He made his first-class debut in the County Championship on 1 May 2026 against Sussex.

== Biography ==
Thomas was educated at Cranleigh School, and signed a first professional contract with Surrey County Cricket Club in June 2025. Having come through the Surrey talent pathway, Thomas had previously made his List-A debut for the county in August 2024 against Essex. The following summer, he scored his maiden century in the One Day Cup with 162 for Surrey against Derbyshire, sharing a century partnership with Oliver Sykes.

During the 2025-26 winter, Thomas had success playing grade cricket in Australia for Mount Lawley. He scored 909 runs at 69.92 and was the leading run scorer in the Western Australia First-Grade competition, and was awarded the Olly Cooley Medal, voted as the leading individual in the WA Premier Cricket Competition.

Thomas made his first-class debut for Surrey in the County Championship on 1 May 2026 against Sussex, scoring a century on debut as a teenager with a score of 120.
