= Ben Debenham =

English cricket umpire

Personal information
- Full name: Benjamin John Debenham
- Born: 11 October 1967 (age 59); Chelmsford, Essex, England
- Role: Umpire

Umpiring information
- WODIs umpired: 1 (2012)
- WT20Is umpired: 1 (2012)
- Source: cricketarchive, 27 September 2015

Benjamin John Debenham (born 11 October 1967) is an English cricket umpire who has stood in first-class cricket matches since being named to the ECB Umpires List in 2012. He has also stood in a Women's One Day International cricket matches and Women's Twenty20 Internationals.

Born in Chelmsford, Essex, Debenham also represented Essex, playing for their Second XI as a left-handed batsman.
