= Jack Morley (cricketer) =

English cricketer (born 2001)

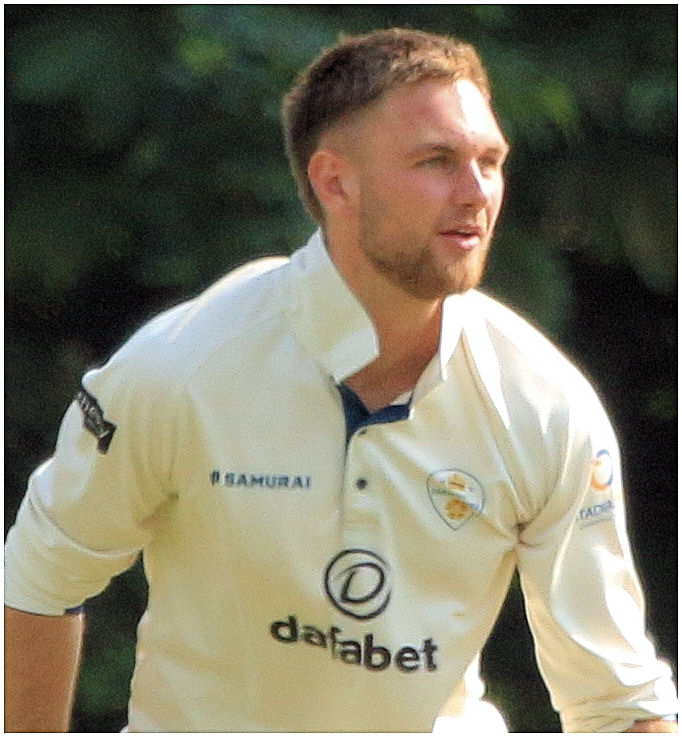
- Morley in 2025

Personal information
- Full name: Jack Peter Morley
- Born: 25 June 2001 (age 25); Rochdale, Greater Manchester, England
- Batting: Left-handed
- Bowling: Slow left-arm orthodox

Domestic team information
- Years: Team
- 2020–2024: Lancashire (squad no. 18)
- 2024: → Derbyshire (on loan)
- 2025–2026: Derbyshire (squad no. 18)
- FC debut: 6 September 2020 Lancashire v Derbyshire
- LA debut: 23 July 2021 Lancashire v Sussex

Career statistics
Competition	FC	LA	T20
Matches	28	35	11
Runs scored	237	55	11
Batting average	9.11	9.16	11.00
100s/50s	0/0	0/0	0/0
Top score	41	10*	6*
Balls bowled	5,183	1,616	216
Wickets	71	41	10
Bowling average	39.02	35.63	30.90
5 wickets in innings	3	1	0
10 wickets in match	0	0	0
Best bowling	6/55	5/28	4/44
Catches/stumpings	13/–	11/–	5/–
- Source: Cricinfo, 27 September 2026

Jack Peter Morley (born 25 June 2001) is an English cricketer. He made his first-class debut on 6 September 2020, for Lancashire in the 2020 Bob Willis Trophy. He made his List A debut on 23 July 2021, for Lancashire in the 2021 Royal London One-Day Cup. During the 2024 season he had two loan spells at Derbyshire, at the conclusion of the season he joined them on a two-year contract. Morley agreed a two-year contract extension with Derbyshire in June 2026, tying him into the club until at least the end of the 2028 season.
