= Hamza Shaikh =

English cricketer (born 2006)

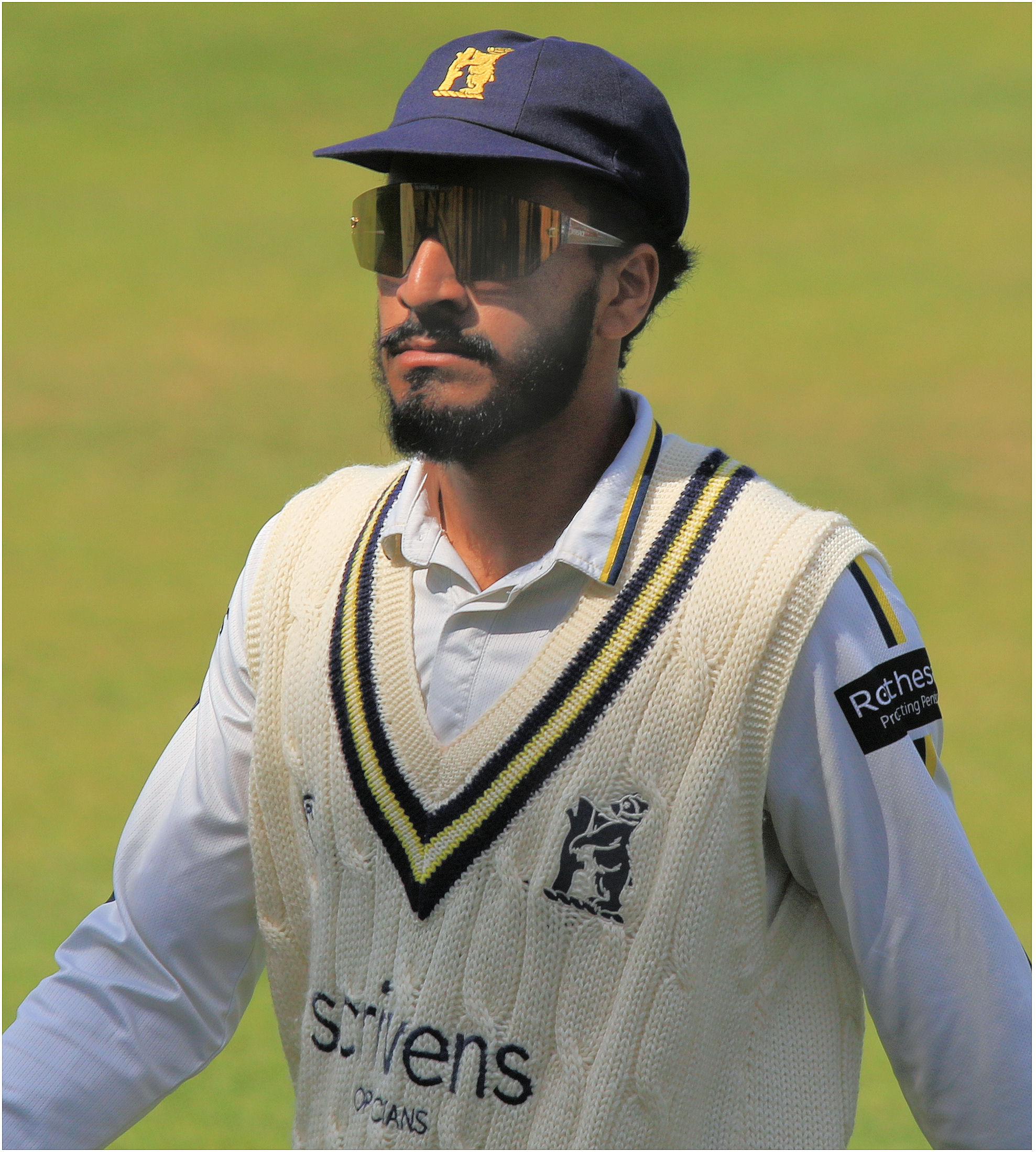
- Shaikh in 2025

Personal information
- Born: 29 May 2006 (age 20); Birmingham, England
- Height: 6 ft (183 cm)
- Batting: Right-handed
- Bowling: Right arm off break

Domestic team information
- Years: Team
- 2022–2026: Warwickshire (squad no. 15)
- 2026: → Leicestershire (on loan)
- FC debut: 14 August 2024 England Lions v Sri Lanka
- LA debut: 12 August 2022 Warwickshire v Sussex

Career statistics
Competition	FC	LA	T20
Matches	13	37	1
Runs scored	469	1,106	2
Batting average	21.31	39.50	2.00
100s/50s	0/2	2/5	0/0
Top score	91	104*	2
Catches/stumpings	6/–	13/–	3/–
- Source: CricInfo, 26 September 2026

Hamza Shaikh (born 29 May 2006) is an English cricketer who plays for Leicestershire. He is a right-handed batsman and legbreak bowler.

== Early life ==
Born in Birmingham, Shaikh attended Eden Boys School, Perry Barr and Sandwell College, where he studied a BTEC in Sports Coaching & Development. He joined Warwickshire at under-10 level. He played club cricket for Knowle & Dorridge in the Birmingham and District League.

== Domestic career ==
He signed a professional contract as a 16-year-old with Warwickshire in June 2022. In 2022, he was 12th man for the England Test team at Edgbaston against India. He made his List-A cricket debut for Warwickshire on 12 August 2022, against Sussex. He extended his contract with Warwickshire in October 2022, agreeing to a two-year deal, and then signed a further two-year extension in April 2025.

In July 2026, Leicestershire signed Shaikh from Warwickshire on a three-year deal, with Shaikh initially joining Leicestershire on loan for the remainder of the 2026 season, before making the switch permanent in November 2026.

== International career ==
He played for England U19 at the 2024 Under-19 Cricket World Cup. He went on to captain the England U19 side in the summer of 2024, scoring a century against Sri Lanka U19 in July 2024. In December 2024, he travelled with the England Lions on their tour of South Africa. Subsequently, Sheikh was included in the England Lions squad to tour Australia in January 2025.
