= Kent County Cricket Club in 2025 =

2025 season of an English cricket team

Kent County Cricket Club
2025 season
- Coach: (England) Adam Hollioake
- Captain: (England) Daniel Bell-Drummond (England) Sam Billings (T20)
- Overseas players: (Australia) Wes Agar; (Pakistan) Kashif Ali; (South Africa) Keith Dudgeon; (Australia) Tom Rogers (T20 only)
- Ground(s): St Lawrence Ground, Canterbury; County Ground, Beckenham
- County Championship: 8th, Division 2
- One-Day Cup: 7th, Group B
- T20 Blast: Quarter-finals

In 2025, Kent County Cricket Club competed in Division Two of the 2025 County Championship, as well as the 2025 One-Day Cup and the 2025 T20 Blast. Adam Hollioake replaced Matthew Walker as head coach. Daniel Bell-Drummond remained as the club captain, with Sam Billings retaining captaincy of the Twenty20 team.

== Squad ==
=== Departures ===
Hamidullah Qadri and Arafat Bhuiyan both left the club at the end of the 2024 season.

=== Arrivals ===
On 30 September 2024, Kent announced the signing of wicket-keeper batsman Chris Benjamin from Warwickshire. Australian fast bowler returns from the end of May, after injury forced him to end his 2024 spell with Kent early. Ahead of Agar's arrival, Kent's overseas players will be pace bowlers Keith Dudgeon, from South Africa, and Pakistan international Kashif Ali. After taking 8 wickets on his debut, a 145-run win against Northamptonshire, Dudgeon sustained a knee injury that ended his stint at the club. Australian bowler Tom Rogers re-signed with the county to play in the T20 Blast for a second season. On 31 March 2025, Kent announced the signing of fast-bowling all-rounder Corey Flintoff (son of former England captain Andrew Flintoff) on a two-year rookie contract.

On 1 May, following a series of injuries, Kent signed Essex bowler Jamal Richards in loan for two matches. On 15 May, bowlers Jake Ball and Alfie Ogborne signed two-match loan deals from Somerset. Ogborne had played two matches on loan for Kent during the 2024 season, while Ball is a former England international.

On 1 August, Kent signed Pakistan-born leg-spinning all-rounder Mohammed Rizvi for the One Day Cup after a trial in the second XI.

=== Squad list ===
- Ages given as of the first day of the County Championship, 4 April 2025

No.	Name	Nationality	Birth date	Batting style	Bowling style	Notes
Batsmen
2	Ben Compton	England	29 March 1994 (aged 31)	Left-handed	Right-arm off break	
5	Ekansh Singh	England	16 July 2006 (aged 18)	Right-handed	Right-arm medium	
6	Joe Denly	England	16 March 1986 (aged 39)	Right-handed	Right-arm leg break	
14	Tawanda Muyeye	Zimbabwe	5 March 2001 (aged 24)	Right-handed	Right-arm off break	Qualifies as a domestic player
16	Zak Crawley	England	3 February 1998 (aged 27)	Right-handed	Right-arm medium	
23	Daniel Bell-Drummond	England	3 August 1993 (aged 31)	Right-handed	Right-arm medium	Club captain
34	Jack Leaning	England	18 October 1993 (aged 31)	Right-handed	Right-arm medium/off break	Vice-captain
All-rounders
9	Grant Stewart	Italy	19 February 1994 (aged 31)	Right-handed	Right-arm medium	EU passport
22	Corey Flintoff	England	8 March 2006 (aged 19)	Right-handed	Right-arm fast-medium	Rookie contract
22	Oliver Curtiss	England	22 June 2006 (aged 18)	Right-handed	Right-arm medium	Rookie contract
33	Joey Evison	England	14 November 2001 (aged 23)	Right-handed	Right arm medium	
42	Jaydn Denly	England	5 January 2006 (aged 19)	Left-handed	Slow left arm orthodox	
55	Marcus O'Riordan	England	25 January 1998 (aged 27)	Right-handed	Right-arm off break	
62	Mohammed Rizvi	England	13 January 1998 (aged 27)	Right-handed	Right-arm leg break	One Day Cup only
Wicket-keepers
7	Sam Billings	England	15 June 1991 (aged 33)	Right-handed	—	T20 captain; White-ball contract only
12	Chris Benjamin	South Africa	29 April 1999 (aged 25)	Right-handed	Right-arm medium	UK passport
15	Ben Dawkins	England	19 October 2006 (aged 18)	Right-handed	–	UK passport
72	Harry Finch	England	10 February 1995 (aged 30)	Right-handed	Right-arm medium-fast	
Bowlers
8	Wes Agar	Australia	5 February 1997 (aged 28)	Right-handed	Right-arm fast-medium	Overseas player (April–July)
17	Nathan Gilchrist	South Africa	11 June 2000 (aged 24)	Left-handed	Right-arm fast-medium	UK passport
18	Fred Klaassen	Netherlands	13 November 1992 (aged 32)	Right-handed	Left-arm medium-fast	White-ball contract only
19	Jas Singh	England	19 September 2002 (aged 22)	Right-handed	Right-arm fast-medium	
25	Kashif Ali	Pakistan	6 June 1994 (aged 30)	Right-handed	Right-arm fast-medium	Overseas player (April–May)
28	Matt Parkinson	England	24 October 1996 (aged 28)	Right-handed	Right-arm leg break	
44	George Garrett	England	4 March 2000 (aged 25)	Left-handed	Left-arm fast	
45	Michael Cohen	South Africa	4 August 1998 (aged 26)	Left-handed	Left-arm fast-medium	UK residency
64	Matt Quinn	New Zealand	28 February 1993 (aged 32)	Right-handed	Right-arm medium-fast	UK passport
75	Keith Dudgeon	South Africa	7 November 1995 (aged 29)	Right-handed	Right-arm fast-medium	Overseas player (April)

== County Championship ==
=== Division One ===
4–7 April	Northamptonshire (H)	v	Kent	Kent won by 145 runs
Scorecard	231 (62.5 overs); Tawanda Muyeye 72 (106); Raphael Weatherall 3/32 (10 overs)		143 (42 overs); Rob Keogh 64 (81); Jas Singh 4/35 (12 overs)	County Ground, Northampton; Umpires: Hassan Adnan and Rob Bailey
Scorecard	171 (55.3 overs); Joey Evison 52 (96); Raphael Weatherall 3/38 (10 overs)		114 (35.4 overs); George Bartlett 60* (79); Keith Dudgeon 7/36 (10.4 overs)	County Ground, Northampton; Umpires: Hassan Adnan and Rob Bailey
Northamptonshire won the toss and chose to field.; Points: Northamptonshire 3, Kent 19; Keith Dudgeon played his first match for Kent.

11–14 April	Middlesex	v	Kent (H)	Kent won by 8 wickets
Scorecard	222 (60.3 overs); Jack Davies 47* (77); Nathan Gilchrist 3/43 (16 overs)		218 (49 overs); Grant Stewart 56 (56); Blake Cullen 4/60 (11 overs)	St Lawrence Ground, Canterbury; Umpires: Surendiran Shanmugam and Jack Shantry
Scorecard	311 (101.4 overs); Ben Geddes 75 (142); Grant Stewart 3/52 (22)		316/2 (64.4 overs); Tawanda Muyeye 125* (127); Zafar Gohar 2/91 (20 overs)	St Lawrence Ground, Canterbury; Umpires: Surendiran Shanmugam and Jack Shantry
Kent won the toss and chose to field.; Points: Kent 19, Middlesex 3; Kashif Ali played his first match for Kent.

18–21 April	Gloucestershire	v	Kent (H)	Match drawn
Scorecard	472 (110.5 overs); James Bracey 151* (224); Nathan Gilchrist 7/100 (26 overs)		393 (105.3 overs); Ben Compton 178* (298); Graeme van Buuren 2/14 (10.3 overs)	St Lawrence Ground, Canterbury; Umpires: Paul Baldwin and Chris Watts
Scorecard	333/5 (86 overs); Miles Hammond 89 (136); Jack Leaning 3/106 (27 overs)		124/6 (40.3 overs); Zak Crawley 54* (112); Tom Price 4/33 (10 overs)	St Lawrence Ground, Canterbury; Umpires: Paul Baldwin and Chris Watts
Kent won the toss and chose to field.; Points: Kent 14, Gloucestershire 16

2–5 May	Kent	v	Middlesex (H)	Middlesex won by 2 wickets
Scorecard	129 (50.3 overs); Tawanda Muyeye 29 (53); Toby Roland-Jones 5/33 (14 overs)		238 (65 overs); Ryan Higgins 54 (101); Joey Evison 3/43 (14 overs)	Lord's, London; Umpires: Rob Bailey and Anthony Harris
Scorecard	473 (30.5 overs); Daniel Bell-Drummond 223 (360); Toby Roland-Jones 3/107 (29 overs)		366/8 (119 overs); Luke Hollman 103 (192); Joey Evison 3/71 (24 overs)	Lord's, London; Umpires: Rob Bailey and Anthony Harris
Kent won the toss and chose to bat.; Points: Middlesex 19, Kent 3; Chris Benjamin and Jamal Richards played their first matches for Kent.

9–12 May	Glamorgan	v	Kent (H)	Glamorgan won by an innings and 161 runs
Scorecard	549/9d (132 overs); Ben Kellaway 181* (228); Kashif Ali 4/92 (24 overs)		212 (74.1 overs); Chris Benjamin 94* (171); Timm van der Gugten 3/23 (12 overs)	St Lawrence Ground, Canterbury; Umpires: Mark Newell and Sue Redfern
Scorecard			176 (48.2 overs) (f/o); Tawanda Muyeye 41 (56); Asitha Fernando 3/18 (7 overs)	St Lawrence Ground, Canterbury; Umpires: Mark Newell and Sue Redfern
Kent won the toss and elected to field.; Points: Kent 2, Glamorgan 23; Ekansh Singh made his first class debut.

16–19 May	Kent	v	Gloucestershire (H)	Gloucestershire won by 3 wickets
Scorecard	424 (110.4 overs); Grant Stewart 182 (189); Ajeet Singh Dale 7/110 (26 overs)		516 (125 overs); Cameron Green 128 (184); Jake Ball 3/132 (30 overs)	County Ground, Bristol; Umpires: Anthony Harris and James Tredwell
Scorecard	253 (84.4 overs); Chris Benjamin 58 (149); Ben Charlesworth 3/5 (6 overs)		162/7 (43.1 overs); Cameron Green 67* (90); Nathan Gilchrist 4/43 (15 overs)	County Ground, Bristol; Umpires: Anthony Harris and James Tredwell
Gloucestershire won the toss and chose to field.; Points: Gloucestershire 24, Kent 6; Jake Ball played his first match for Kent.

23–26 May	Derbyshire (H)	v	Kent	Derbyshire won by an innings and 14 runs
Scorecard	587/5d (140 overs); Caleb Jewell 232 (361); Jack Leaning 2/85 (18 overs)		326 (98.5 overs); Ben Compton 156 (287); Anuj Dal 4/50 (22 overs)	County Ground, Derby; Umpires: Neil Pratt and Surendiran Shanmugam
Scorecard			247 (70.4 overs); Tawanda Muyeye 55 (71); Luis Reece 3/21 (10 overs)	County Ground, Derby; Umpires: Neil Pratt and Surendiran Shanmugam
Derbyshire won the toss and chose to bat.; Points: Derbyshire 23, Kent 2

22–25 June	Kent	v	Lancashire (H)	Match drawn
Scorecard	374 (123.2 overs); Ben Compton 135 (296); George Balderson 3/54 (23 overs)		639/9d (142 overs); Ashton Turner 154 (148); Joey Evison 3/61 (21 overs)	Stanley Park, Blackpool; Umpires: David Millns and Sue Redfern
Scorecard	328/8 (92 overs); Grant Stewart 130 (122); Chris Green 4/104 (38 overs)			Stanley Park, Blackpool; Umpires: David Millns and Sue Redfern
Lancashire won the toss and chose to field.; Points: Lancashire 14, Kent 11

29 June – 2 July	Kent (H)	v	Northamptonshire	Match drawn
Scorecard	566/8d (155.5 overs); Daniel Bell-Drummond 158 (275); Liam Guthrie 3/92 (25 overs)		722/6d (146 overs); Saif Zaib 196* (213); Jaydn Denly 2/148 (24 overs)	St Lawrence Ground, Canterbury; Umpires: Rob Bailey and Ben Peverall
Scorecard	160/8 (61 overs); Joey Evison 49* (104); Yuzvendra Chahal 4/51 (30 overs)			St Lawrence Ground, Canterbury; Umpires: Rob Bailey and Ben Peverall
Kent won the toss and chose to bat.; Points: Kent 13, Northamptonshire 14

22–25 July	Kent	v	Glamorgan (H)	Glamorgan won by 5 wickets
Scorecard	155 (53.2 overs); Daniel Bell-Drummond 42 (81); Timm van der Gugten 3/27 (15 overs)		327 (100.5 overs); Ben Kellaway 90 (174); Wes Agar 4/58 (17 overs)	Sophia Gardens, Cardiff; Umpires: Paul Baldwin and Chris Watts
Scorecard	360 (114.3 overs); Harry Finch 68 (125); Kiran Carlson 3/24 (5 overs)		189/5 (45.5 overs); Kiran Carlson 89* (115); Matt Parkinson 4/82 (18.5 overs)	Sophia Gardens, Cardiff; Umpires: Paul Baldwin and Chris Watts
Glamorgan won the toss and chose to field.; Points: Glamorgan 21, Kent 3

29 July – 1 August	Leicestershire	v	Kent (H)	Match drawn
Scorecard	471 (114.5 overs); Rehan Ahmed 119 (156); Matt Parkinson 4/82 (18.5 overs)		445/8 (152 overs); Ben Compton 221 (380); Rehan Ahmed 3/134 (42 overs)	St Lawrence Ground, Canterbury; Umpires: Ben Debenham and Simon Widdup
Kent won the toss and chose to field.; Points: Leicestershire 14, Kent 13; Ben Dawkins made his first class debut.; Ben Compton achieved his highest score in first class cricket.

8–11 September	Kent (H)	v	Lancashire	Match drawn
Scorecard	293 (86 overs); Ben Compton 77 (166); Mitchell Stanley 5/80 (16 overs)		284 (77.2 overs); Luke Wells 80 (127); Matt Quinn 4/43 (19 overs)	St Lawrence Ground, Canterbury; Umpires: Anthony Harris and Surendiran Shanmugam
Scorecard	293 (77.3 overs); Jaydn Denly 74* (106); Mitchell Stanley 6/100 (18.3 overs)		138/3 (28 overs); Marcus Harris 50* (69); Matt Quinn 2/21 (7 overs)	St Lawrence Ground, Canterbury; Umpires: Anthony Harris and Surendiran Shanmugam
Kent won the toss and chose to bat.; Points: Kent 12, Lancashire 12

15–18 September	Leicestershire (H)	v	Kent	Match drawn
Scorecard	459/7d (84.1 overs); Rishi Patel 114 (143); Joey Evison 3/67 (16.1 overs)		17/0 (9.1 overs); Harry Finch 9* (24)	Grace Road, Leicester; Umpires: Hassan Adnan and Simon Widdup
Kent won the toss and chose to field.; No play was possible on days 1, 3 or 4 due to rain.; Points: Leicestershire 13, Kent 4 (Kent were deducted 6 points for a slow over rate); Oliver Curtiss and Corey Flintoff both made their first class debuts.

24–27 September	Derbyshire	v	Kent (H)	Derbyshire won by an innings and 229 runs
Scorecard	698/6d (145 overs); Luis Reece 211 (342); Matt Parkinson 3/188 (38 overs)		271 (85.4 overs); Ekansh Singh 71 (113); Jack Morley 5/99 (23 overs)	St Lawrence Ground, Canterbury; Umpires: Hassan Adnan and Mark Newell
Scorecard			198 (61.5 overs) (f/o); Ben Compton 65 (120); Luis Reece 5/63 (21.5 overs)	St Lawrence Ground, Canterbury; Umpires: Hassan Adnan and Mark Newell
Derbyshire won the toss and chose to bat.; Points: Kent 1, Derbyshire 24

== One-Day Cup ==
=== Group B ===
7 August	Kent; 287/9 (50 overs)	v	Sussex (H); 278/7 (48.2 overs)	Sussex won by 3 wickets
Scorecard	Kent; 287/9 (50 overs)	v	Sussex (H); 278/7 (48.2 overs)	Arundel Castle Cricket Ground, Arundel; Umpires: Mark Newell and Chris Watts
Scorecard	Joey Evison 52 (54); Fynn Hudson-Prentice 3/65 (10 overs)		Oli Carter 68 (85); Michael Cohen 4/65 (9 overs)	Arundel Castle Cricket Ground, Arundel; Umpires: Mark Newell and Chris Watts
Sussex won the toss and chose to field.; Mohammed Rizvi made his List A debut and Michael Cohen also played his first game for Kent.				Arundel Castle Cricket Ground, Arundel; Umpires: Mark Newell and Chris Watts

10 August	Kent (H); 238/8 (50 overs)	v	Durham; 239/3 (39.2 overs)	Durham won by 7 wickets
Scorecard	Kent (H); 238/8 (50 overs)	v	Durham; 239/3 (39.2 overs)	County Ground, Beckenham; Umpires: James Tredwell and Simon Widdup
Scorecard	Jack Leaning 68 (50); Mitchell Killeen 3/15 (10 overs)		Emilio Gay 119* (111); Matt Parkinson 2/54 (8 overs)	County Ground, Beckenham; Umpires: James Tredwell and Simon Widdup
Kent won the toss and chose to bat.				County Ground, Beckenham; Umpires: James Tredwell and Simon Widdup

13 August	Warwickshire (H); 283/9 (50 overs)	v	Kent; 204 (40.5 overs)	Warwickshire won by 79 runs
Scorecard	Warwickshire (H); 283/9 (50 overs)	v	Kent; 204 (40.5 overs)	Rugby School Ground, Rugby; Umpires: Neil Pratt and Chris Watts
Scorecard	Ed Barnard 60 (68); Grant Stewart 2/33 (7 overs)		Jaydn Denly 52 (58); Tazeem Chaudry Ali 5/54 (8.5 overs)	Rugby School Ground, Rugby; Umpires: Neil Pratt and Chris Watts
Warwickshire won the toss and chose to bat.; Ben Dawkins made his List A debut.				Rugby School Ground, Rugby; Umpires: Neil Pratt and Chris Watts

17 August	Kent (H); 315/8 (50 overs)	v	Lancashire; 293 (47.3 overs)	Kent won by 22 runs
Scorecard	Kent (H); 315/8 (50 overs)	v	Lancashire; 293 (47.3 overs)	County Ground, Beckenham; Umpires: Anthony Harris and Nigel Llong
Scorecard	Jaydn Denly 91 (95); Tom Bailey 2/54 (10 overs)		Josh Bohannon 133 (110); Matt Parkinson 3/57 (9.3 overs)	County Ground, Beckenham; Umpires: Anthony Harris and Nigel Llong
Lancashire won the toss and chose to field.				County Ground, Beckenham; Umpires: Anthony Harris and Nigel Llong

19 August	Kent; 279/6 (50 overs)	v	Middlesex (H); 283/4 (45 overs)	Middlesex won by 6 wickets
Scorecard	Kent; 279/6 (50 overs)	v	Middlesex (H); 283/4 (45 overs)	Brunton Memorial Ground, Radlett; Umpires: James Tredwell and Rob White
Scorecard	Jack Leaning 63* (48); Henry Brookes 3/47 (10 overs)		Ben Geddes 141* (119); Ekansh Singh 1/23 (4 overs)	Brunton Memorial Ground, Radlett; Umpires: James Tredwell and Rob White
Middlesex won the toss and chose to field.; Corey Flintoff made his List A debut.				Brunton Memorial Ground, Radlett; Umpires: James Tredwell and Rob White

21 August	Northamptonshire (H); 243 (47.2 overs)	v	Kent; 247/3 (44.4 overs)	Kent won by 7 wickets
Scorecard	Northamptonshire (H); 243 (47.2 overs)	v	Kent; 247/3 (44.4 overs)	County Ground, Northampton; Umpires: Anthony Harris and Mohammed Waseem
Scorecard	Aadi Sharma 82 (90); Joey Evison 3/36 (10 overs)		Ben Dawkins 111* (105); Nirvan Ramesh 1/13 (4 overs)	County Ground, Northampton; Umpires: Anthony Harris and Mohammed Waseem
Northamptonshire won the toss and chose to bat.				County Ground, Northampton; Umpires: Anthony Harris and Mohammed Waseem

24 August	Kent (H); 269/9 (50 overs)	v	Somerset; 270/6 (44.3 overs)	Somerset won by 4 wickets
Scorecard	Kent (H); 269/9 (50 overs)	v	Somerset; 270/6 (44.3 overs)	St Lawrence Ground, Canterbury; Umpires: Phil Mustard and Ben Peverall
Scorecard	Jaydn Denly 65 (72); Jack Leach 2/37 (10 overs)		Tom Lammonby 102 (104); Jaydn Denly 2/41 (7.3 overs)	St Lawrence Ground, Canterbury; Umpires: Phil Mustard and Ben Peverall
Kent won the toss and chose to field.; Oliver Curtiss made his List A debut.				St Lawrence Ground, Canterbury; Umpires: Phil Mustard and Ben Peverall

26 August	Yorkshire; 301/9 (50 overs)	v	Kent (H); 225 (44.2 overs)	Yorkshire won by 76 runs
Scorecard	Yorkshire; 301/9 (50 overs)	v	Kent (H); 225 (44.2 overs)	St Lawrence Ground, Canterbury; Umpires: Anna Harris and Martin Saggers
Scorecard	James Wharton 118 (106); Ekansh Singh 3/42 (8 overs)		Jaydn Denly 79 (81); Dom Bess 4/43 (9 overs)	St Lawrence Ground, Canterbury; Umpires: Anna Harris and Martin Saggers
Yorkshire won the toss and chose to bat.				St Lawrence Ground, Canterbury; Umpires: Anna Harris and Martin Saggers

== T20 Blast ==
=== South Group ===
30 May	Gloucestershire (H); 208/3 (20 overs)	v	Kent; 204/7 (20 overs)	Kent won by 4 runs
Scorecard	Gloucestershire (H); 208/3 (20 overs)	v	Kent; 204/7 (20 overs)	County Ground, Bristol; Umpires: Ben Debenham and Russell Warren
Scorecard	Daniel Bell-Drummond 60 (38); Tom Smith 2/39 (4 overs)		Oliver Price 51 (26); Tom Rogers 2/22 (4 overs)	County Ground, Bristol; Umpires: Ben Debenham and Russell Warren
Gloucestershire won the toss and chose to field.				County Ground, Bristol; Umpires: Ben Debenham and Russell Warren

5 June	Middlesex (H); 172/9 (20 overs)	v	Kent	No result
Scorecard	Middlesex (H); 172/9 (20 overs)	v	Kent	Lord's, London; Umpires: Ben Debenham and Nigel Llong
Scorecard	Zak Crawley 57 (34); Tom Helm 3/29 (4 overs)			Lord's, London; Umpires: Ben Debenham and Nigel Llong
Middlesex won the toss and chose to field.; No further play was possible due to rain.				Lord's, London; Umpires: Ben Debenham and Nigel Llong

6 June	Surrey; 193/7 (20 overs)	v	Kent (H); 151/9 (20 overs)	Surrey won by 42 runs
Scorecard	Surrey; 193/7 (20 overs)	v	Kent (H); 151/9 (20 overs)	St Lawrence Ground, Canterbury; Umpires: Neil Bainton and James Tredwell
Scorecard	Laurie Evans 62* (26); Grant Stewart 3/27 (4 overs)		Zak Crawley 46 (31); Mitchell Santner 3/28 (4 overs)	St Lawrence Ground, Canterbury; Umpires: Neil Bainton and James Tredwell
Kent won the toss and chose to field.				St Lawrence Ground, Canterbury; Umpires: Neil Bainton and James Tredwell

8 June	Hampshire; 177/7 (20 overs)	v	Kent (H); 181/2 (19 overs)	Kent won by 8 wickets
Scorecard	Hampshire; 177/7 (20 overs)	v	Kent (H); 181/2 (19 overs)	St Lawrence Ground, Canterbury; Umpires: Ben Debenham and Anthony Harris
Scorecard	Joe Weatherley 63* (56); Tom Rogers 3/33 (4 overs)		Zak Crawley 75 (43); Chris Wood 2/32 (4 overs)	St Lawrence Ground, Canterbury; Umpires: Ben Debenham and Anthony Harris
Hampshire won the toss and chose to bat.				St Lawrence Ground, Canterbury; Umpires: Ben Debenham and Anthony Harris

12 June	Kent; 171/7 (20 overs)	v	Surrey (H); 173/6 (20 overs)	Surrey won by 4 wickets
Scorecard	Kent; 171/7 (20 overs)	v	Surrey (H); 173/6 (20 overs)	The Oval, London; Umpires: Hassan Adnan and Ben Debenham
Scorecard	Joe Denly 40 (22); Chris Jordan 4/10 (4 overs)		Jason Roy 56 (30); Wes Agar 3/26 (4 overs)	The Oval, London; Umpires: Hassan Adnan and Ben Debenham
Surrey won the toss and chose to field.				The Oval, London; Umpires: Hassan Adnan and Ben Debenham

15 June	Kent; 228/5 (20 overs)	v	Somerset (H); 224/6 (20 overs)	Kent won by 4 runs
Scorecard	Kent; 228/5 (20 overs)	v	Somerset (H); 224/6 (20 overs)	County Ground, Taunton; Umpires: Mike Burns and Mark Newell
Scorecard	Daniel Bell-Drummond 100 (49); Riley Meredith 3/45 (4 overs)		Tom Banton 68 (33); Joey Evison 2/24 (4 overs)	County Ground, Taunton; Umpires: Mike Burns and Mark Newell
Somerset won the toss and chose to field.				County Ground, Taunton; Umpires: Mike Burns and Mark Newell

18 June	Kent (H); 157/9 (20 overs)	v	Gloucestershire; 160/3 (18.2 overs)	Gloucestershire won by 7 wickets
Scorecard	Kent (H); 157/9 (20 overs)	v	Gloucestershire; 160/3 (18.2 overs)	St Lawrence Ground, Canterbury; Umpires: Nigel Llong and Mark Newell
Scorecard	Harry Finch 42 (34); Ajeet Singh Dale 3/24 (4 overs)		Jack Taylor 54* (36); Matt Parkinson 1/27 (4 overs)	St Lawrence Ground, Canterbury; Umpires: Nigel Llong and Mark Newell
Kent won the toss and chose to bat.				St Lawrence Ground, Canterbury; Umpires: Nigel Llong and Mark Newell

20 June	Kent; 219/3 (20 overs)	v	Essex (H); 172 (19 overs)	Kent won by 47 runs
Scorecard	Kent; 219/3 (20 overs)	v	Essex (H); 172 (19 overs)	County Ground, Chelmsford; Umpires: Chris Watts and Rob White
Scorecard	Tawanda Muyeye 100 (59); Luc Benkenstein 1/29 (3 overs)		Simon Harmer 55 (21); Matt Parkinson 1/27 (4 overs)	County Ground, Chelmsford; Umpires: Chris Watts and Rob White
Essex won the toss and chose to field.				County Ground, Chelmsford; Umpires: Chris Watts and Rob White

4 July	Sussex Sharks; 195/9 (20 overs)	v	Kent (H); 161 (19.4 overs)	Sussex won by 34 runs
Scorecard	Sussex Sharks; 195/9 (20 overs)	v	Kent (H); 161 (19.4 overs)	St Lawrence Ground, Canterbury; Umpires: Nigel Llong and Mark Newell
Scorecard	Daniel Hughes 48 (28); Nathan Gilchrist 3/31 (4 overs)		Harry Finch 56 (26); Danny Lamb 5/15 (3.4 overs)	St Lawrence Ground, Canterbury; Umpires: Nigel Llong and Mark Newell
Kent won the toss and chose to field.				St Lawrence Ground, Canterbury; Umpires: Nigel Llong and Mark Newell

6 July	Kent; 118/9 (20 overs)	v	Glamorgan (H); 122/4 (11.4 overs)	Glamorgan won by 6 wickets
Scorecard	Kent; 118/9 (20 overs)	v	Glamorgan (H); 122/4 (11.4 overs)	Sophia Gardens, Cardiff; Umpires: Anthony Harris and Rob White
Scorecard	Jack Leaning 45* (40); Andy Gorvin 4/17 (4 overs)		Kiran Carlson 34 (19); Fred Klaassen 2/31 (4 overs)	Sophia Gardens, Cardiff; Umpires: Anthony Harris and Rob White
Glamorgan won the toss and chose to field.				Sophia Gardens, Cardiff; Umpires: Anthony Harris and Rob White

9 July	Sussex Sharks (H); 148 (19.5 overs)	v	Kent; 151/8 (19.3 overs)	Kent won by 2 wickets
Scorecard	Sussex Sharks (H); 148 (19.5 overs)	v	Kent; 151/8 (19.3 overs)	County Ground, Hove; Umpires: Martin Saggers and Jack Shantry
Scorecard	Tom Clark 29 (20); Nathan Gilchrist 4/42 (3.5 overs)		Joey Evison 48* (24); Tymal Mills 3/21 (4 overs)	County Ground, Hove; Umpires: Martin Saggers and Jack Shantry
Sussex won the toss and chose to bat.				County Ground, Hove; Umpires: Martin Saggers and Jack Shantry

11 July	Kent (H); 137/8 (20 overs)	v	Somerset; 138/5 (18.3 overs)	Somerset won by 5 wickets
Scorecard	Kent (H); 137/8 (20 overs)	v	Somerset; 138/5 (18.3 overs)	St Lawrence Ground, Canterbury; Umpires: Neil Bainton and Mark Newell
Scorecard	Joe Denly 40 (35); Riley Meredith 3/19 (4 overs)		Lewis Gregory 37 (23); Nathan Gilchrist 1/12 (2 overs)	St Lawrence Ground, Canterbury; Umpires: Neil Bainton and Mark Newell
Somerset won the toss and chose to field.				St Lawrence Ground, Canterbury; Umpires: Neil Bainton and Mark Newell

13 July	Middlesex; 160/5 (20 overs)	v	Kent (H); 165/3 (18.1 overs)	Kent won by 7 wickets
Scorecard	Middlesex; 160/5 (20 overs)	v	Kent (H); 165/3 (18.1 overs)	St Lawrence Ground, Canterbury; Umpires: Ben Debenham and Martin Saggers
Scorecard	Leus du Plooy 68 (45); Fred Klaassen 3/39 (4 overs)		Tawanda Muyeye 59 (41); Zafar Gohar 1/22 (3 overs)	St Lawrence Ground, Canterbury; Umpires: Ben Debenham and Martin Saggers
Middlesex won the toss and elected to bat.				St Lawrence Ground, Canterbury; Umpires: Ben Debenham and Martin Saggers

18 July	Essex; 172/6 (20 overs)	v	Kent (H); 173/3 (17.2 overs)	Kent won by 7 wickets
Scorecard	Essex; 172/6 (20 overs)	v	Kent (H); 173/3 (17.2 overs)	St Lawrence Ground, Canterbury; Umpires: Rob Bailey and Martin Saggers
Scorecard	Paul Walter 52 (37); Nathan Gilchrist 2/35 (4 overs)		Tawanda Muyeye 80 (49); Matt Critchley 1/18 (3 overs)	St Lawrence Ground, Canterbury; Umpires: Rob Bailey and Martin Saggers
Kent won the toss and chose to field.				St Lawrence Ground, Canterbury; Umpires: Rob Bailey and Martin Saggers

=== Quarter final ===
6 September	Lancashire (H); 153 (20 overs)	v	Kent; 156/7 (18.3 overs)	Lancashire won by 3 wickets
Scorecard	Lancashire (H); 153 (20 overs)	v	Kent; 156/7 (18.3 overs)	Old Trafford, Manchester; Umpires: Michael Gough and James Middlebrook; Player of the match: Liam Livingstone (Lancashire)
Scorecard	Joe Denly 28 (20); Luke Wood 3/29 (4 overs)		Liam Livingstone 85* (45); Fred Klaassen 3/14 (4 overs)	Old Trafford, Manchester; Umpires: Michael Gough and James Middlebrook; Player of the match: Liam Livingstone (Lancashire)
Kent won the toss and chose to bat.				Old Trafford, Manchester; Umpires: Michael Gough and James Middlebrook; Player of the match: Liam Livingstone (Lancashire)
