= 2025 One-Day Cup =

Cricket tournament

- Dates: 5 August – 20 September 2025
- Administrator: England and Wales Cricket Board
- Cricket format: List A
- Tournament format(s): Group stage and knockout
- Champions: Worcestershire (1st title)
- Participants: 18
- Matches: 77
- Most runs: Nick Gubbins (707)
- Most wickets: Ben Allison (19)
- Official website: ecb.co.uk

The 2025 One-Day Cup (also known for sponsorship reasons as the 2025 Metro Bank One Day Cup) was a limited overs cricket competition in England and Wales. Matches were contested with 50 overs per side, having List A cricket status, with all eighteen first-class counties competing in the tournament. The tournament was played in a 50-over format with List A status, featuring all eighteen first-class counties. It ran from 5 August to 20 September 2025. Glamorgan were the defending champions.

Worcestershire won the tournament after beating Hampshire in the rain-affected final.

== Teams ==
The teams were placed into the following groups:

- Group A: Derbyshire, Essex, Glamorgan, Gloucestershire, Hampshire, Leicestershire, Nottinghamshire, Surrey, Worcestershire
- Group B: Durham, Kent, Lancashire, Middlesex, Northamptonshire, Somerset, Sussex, Warwickshire, Yorkshire

In the group stage of the competition, each county plays each of the other eight counties in its group once.

== Standings ==
=== Group A ===
Pos	Team	Pld	W	L	T	NR	Pts	NRR
1	Worcestershire	8	6	1	1	0	26	0.452
2	Hampshire	8	6	2	0	0	24	0.704
3	Gloucestershire	8	6	2	0	0	24	0.330
4	Essex	8	5	3	0	0	20	1.352
5	Nottinghamshire	8	3	4	1	0	14	−0.582
6	Surrey	8	3	5	0	0	12	−1.915
7	Leicestershire	8	2	5	1	0	10	0.244
8	Derbyshire	8	1	5	1	1	8	0.113
9	Glamorgan	8	1	6	0	1	6	−0.947

Source: BBC Sport, ESPNcricinfo

Advance to semi-finals
Advance to quarter-finals

=== Group B ===
Pos	Team	Pld	W	L	NR	Pts	NRR
1	Yorkshire	8	7	1	0	28	1.907
2	Somerset	8	6	2	0	24	0.462
3	Middlesex	8	6	2	0	24	0.143
4	Warwickshire	8	5	3	0	20	0.197
5	Sussex	8	4	4	0	16	−0.313
6	Durham	8	3	5	0	12	−0.753
7	Kent	8	2	6	0	8	−0.603
8	Lancashire	8	1	6	1	6	−0.334
9	Northamptonshire	8	1	6	1	6	−0.858

Source: BBC Sport, ESPNcricinfo

Advance to semi-finals
Advance to quarter-finals

- Points are awarded as follows:
  - Won 4, Lost 0, Tied 2, No Result (but play started) 2, Abandoned without a ball bowled 2

== Fixtures ==
In November 2024, the England and Wales Cricket Board confirmed the fixtures for the tournament, as a part of the 2025 English domestic cricket season.

5 August 2025
11:00
Scorecard

Durham; 310/7 (50 overs)	v	Sussex; 259 (46.3 overs)
Ollie Robinson 100 (79); Ari Karvelas 2/47 (7 overs)		Danny Lamb 74 (57); Will Rhodes 5/30 (7.3 overs)

Durham won by 51 runs
Roseworth Terrace Ground, Gosforth
Umpires: Michael Gough and Neil Pratt

- Sussex won the toss and the elected to field.
- Will Rhodes (Durham) took his first five-wicket haul in List A cricket.

5 August 2025
11:00
Scorecard

Hampshire; 324/6 (50 overs)	v	Glamorgan; 252 (39.5 overs)
Nick Gubbins 144* (147); Zain-ul-Hassan 3/54 (7 overs)		Kiran Carlson 135 (92); Manny Lumsden 3/64 (5 overs)

Hampshire won by 72 runs
The Gnoll, Neath
Umpires: Ben Peverall and Surendiran Shanmugam

- Glamorgan won the toss and elected to field.
- Manny Lumsden, Ben Mayes, Andrew Neal (Hampshire) and Romano Franco (Glamorgan) all made their List A debuts.
- Kiran Carlson (Glamorgan) scored his first century in List A cricket.

5 August 2025
11:00
Scorecard

Gloucestershire; 341/8 (50 overs)	v	Derbyshire; 282 (45.5 overs)
Ollie Price 103 (115); Nick Potts 3/72 (8 overs)		Brooke Guest 86 (88); Zaman Akhter 4/47 (10 overs)

Gloucestershire won by 59 runs
College Ground, Cheltenham
Umpires: Mike Burns and James Tredwell

- Derbyshire won the toss and elected to field.
- Amrit Basra, Joe Hawkins, Rory Haydon (Derbyshire) and Tommy Boorman (Gloucestershire) all made their List A debuts.

5 August 2025
11:00
Scorecard

Lancashire	v	Northamptonshire

Match abandoned
Sedbergh School, Sedbergh
Umpires: Naeem Ashraf and Mark Newell

- No toss.
- No play was possible due to rain.

5 August 2025
11:00
Scorecard

Nottinghamshire; 283/9 (46 overs)	v	Essex; 234 (41.1 overs)
Tom Moores 148 (93); Jamie Porter 4/29 (10 overs)		Simon Fernandes 46* (41); Robert Lord 3/30 (8.1 overs)

Nottinghamshire won by 51 runs (DLS method)
John Fretwell Sporting Complex, Warsop
Umpires: Rob White and Simon Widdup

- Essex won the toss and elected to field.
- The match was reduced to 46 overs per side due to rain.
- Essex were set a revised target of 286 runs in 46 overs due to rain.
- Charlie Bennett (Essex), Joe Pocklington and Sam Seecharan (Nottinghamshire) all made their List A debuts.

5 August 2025
11:00
Scorecard

Warwickshire; 137 (36.3 overs)	v	Yorkshire; 140/5 (32.5 overs)
Vansh Jani 82 (92); Ben Cliff 5/46 (8.3 overs)		Imam-ul-Haq 55 (83); Michael Booth 3/29 (6.5 overs)

Yorkshire won by 5 wickets
North Marine Road Ground, Scarborough
Umpires: Hassan Adnan and Peter Hartley

- Yorkshire won the toss and elected to field.
- Vansh Jani (Warwickshire) made his List A debut.
- Ben Cliff (Yorkshire) took his maiden five-wicket haul in List A cricket.

6 August 2025
11:00
Scorecard

Middlesex; 289/7 (50 overs)	v	Somerset; 293/4 (47.3 overs)
Josh de Caires 71 (86); Jake Ball 3/43 (10 overs)		James Rew 106* (90); Noah Cornwell 2/59 (10 overs)

Somerset won by 6 wickets
Brunton Memorial Ground, Radlett
Umpires: Rob Bailey and Ben Debenham

- Somerset won the toss and elected to field.

6 August 2025
11:00
Scorecard

Surrey; 174 (43.1 overs)	v	Leicestershire; 179/4 (29.3 overs)
Ryan Patel 53 (67); Alex Green 5/25 (7.1 overs)		Ben Cox 38* (36); Yousef Majid 2/54 (10 overs)

Leicestershire won by 6 wickets
Woodbridge Road, Guildford
Umpires: Ian Blackwell and Anthony Harris

- Leicestershire won the toss and elected to field.
- Alex French (Surrey) made his List A debut.
- Alex Green (Leicestershire) took his first five-wicket haul in List A cricket.

7 August 2025
11:00
Scorecard

Glamorgan	v	Derbyshire

Match abandoned
The Gnoll, Neath
Umpires: Surendiran Shanmugam and James Tredwell

- No toss.
- No play was possible due to rain.

7 August 2025
11:00
Scorecard

Essex; 285 (49.3 overs)	v	Hampshire; 288/5 (46.2 overs)
Charlie Allison 80 (90); Andrew Neal 2/44 (10 overs)		Joe Weatherley 116* (105); Tom Westley 3/39 (10 overs)

Hampshire won by 5 wickets
Rose Bowl, Southampton
Umpires: Mike Burns and Ben Peverall

- Hampshire won the toss and elected to field.
- Joe Weatherley (Hampshire) scored his 1,000th run in List A cricket.

7 August 2025
11:00
Scorecard

Worcestershire; 312/7 (47.1 overs)	v	Nottinghamshire; 326/9 (47 overs)
Jake Libby 112* (95); James Hayes 4/63 (9 overs)		Robert Lord 83 (59); Ethan Brookes 3/51 (10 overs)

Match tied (DLS method)
John Fretwell Sporting Complex, Warsop
Umpires: Neil Pratt and Russell Warren

- Nottinghamshire won the toss and elected to field.
- Play was stopped in the first innings at 47.1 overs due to rain.
- Nottinghamshire were set a revised target of 327 runs in 47 overs due to rain.
- Isaac Mohammed (Worcestershire) made his List A debut.

7 August 2025
11:00
Scorecard

Kent; 287/9 (50 overs)	v	Sussex; 288/7 (48.2 overs)
Joey Evison 52 (54); Fynn Hudson-Prentice 3/65 (10 overs)		Oli Carter 68 (85); Michael Cohen 4/65 (9 overs)

Sussex won by 3 wickets
Arundel Castle Cricket Ground, Arundel
Umpires: Mark Newell and Chris Watts

- Sussex won the toss and elected to field.
- Mohammed Rizvi (Kent) made his List A debut.

8 August 2025
11:00
Scorecard

Yorkshire; 374/5 (50 overs)	v	Northamptonshire; 172 (38.5 overs)
Imam-ul-Haq 159 (130); Liam Guthrie 3/87 (8 overs)		George Bartlett 30 (24); Dan Moriarty 4/38 (10 overs)

Yorkshire won by 202 runs
County Ground, Northampton
Umpires: Naeem Ashraf and Simon Widdup

- Yorkshire won the toss and elected to bat.
- Aadi Sharma (Northamptonshire) made his List A debut.

8 August 2025
14:00 (D/N)
Scorecard

Durham; 255/9 (50 overs)	v	Somerset; 258/6 (46.2 overs)
Will Rhodes 100 (120); Alfie Ogborne 5/41 (10 overs)		Thomas Rew 84* (81); Will Rhodes 3/42 (10 overs)

Somerset won by 4 wickets
County Ground, Taunton
Umpires: Ian Blackwell and Anthony Harris

- Durham won the toss and elected to bat.
- Alfie Ogborne (Somerset) took his first five-wicket haul in List A cricket.

8 August 2025
11:00
Scorecard

Gloucestershire; 293/9 (50 overs)	v	Surrey; 208 (43.1 overs)
Ben Charlesworth 80 (83); James Taylor 3/42 (10 overs)		Ollie Sykes 97 (94); Jack Taylor 3/16 (4 overs)

Gloucestershire won by 85 runs
Woodbridge Road, Guildford
Umpires: Hassan Adnan and Neil Bainton

- Gloucestershire won the toss and elected to bat.
- Daaryoush Ahmed (Gloucestershire) and Nikhil Gorantla (Surrey) made their List A debuts.

10 August 2025
11:00
Scorecard

Derbyshire; 341/8 (50 overs)	v	Nottinghamshire; 214 (38.3 overs)
Ross Whiteley 80 (52); Robert Lord 2/76 (10 overs)		Ben Slater 68 (83); Ben Aitchison 4/34 (8.3 overs)

Derbyshire won by 127 runs
County Ground, Derby
Umpires: Peter Hartley and Neil Pratt

- Nottinghamshire won the toss and elected to field.

10 August 2025
11:00
Scorecard

Worcestershire; 340/9 (50 overs)	v	Essex; 280 (45.2 overs)
Kashif Ali 80 (73); Shane Snater 2/50 (10 overs)		Robin Das 51 (50); Ethan Brookes 3/52 (10 overs)

Worcestershire won by 60 runs
County Ground, Chelmsford
Umpires: Naeem Ashraf and Paul Baldwin

- Worcestershire won the toss and elected to bat.

10 August 2025
11:00
Scorecard

Leicestershire; 285/7 (50 overs)	v	Gloucestershire; 286/7 (48.3 overs)
Peter Handscomb 107 (125); Josh Shaw 3/40 (10 overs)		James Bracey 96 (106); Alex Green 5/52 (10 overs)

Gloucestershire won by 3 wickets
County Ground, Bristol
Umpires: Jack Shantry and Rob White

- Gloucestershire won the toss and elected to field.

10 August 2025
11:00
Scorecard

Kent; 238/8 (50 overs)	v	Durham; 239/3 (39.2 overs)
Jack Leaning 68* (50); Mitchell Killeen 3/15 (10 overs)		Emilio Gay 119* (111); Matt Parkinson 2/54 (8 overs)

Durham won by 7 wickets
County Ground, Beckenham
Umpires: James Tredwell and Simon Widdup

- Kent won the toss and elected to bat.

10 August 2025
11:00
Scorecard

Sussex; 255/9 (50 overs)	v	Middlesex; 256/5 (45.5 overs)
Jack Carson 73 (58); Noah Cornwell 3/50 (10 overs)		Sam Robson 89 (88); Henry Crocombe 3/48 (10 overs)

Middlesex won by 5 wickets
Lord's, London
Umpires: Nigel Llong and Mark Newell

- Middlesex won the toss and elected to field.
- James Feldman (Middlesex) made his List A debut.

10 August 2025
11:00
Scorecard

Somerset; 250/7 (50 overs)	v	Lancashire; 254/8 (48.4 overs)
Lewis Goldsworthy 63 (88); Arav Shetty 3/34 (10 overs)		Marcus Harris 95 (99); Josh Davey 2/40 (7.4 overs)

Lancashire won by 2 wickets
County Ground, Taunton
Umpires: Mike Burns and Ben Peverall

- Lancashire won the toss and elected to field.
- Luke Hands, Arav Shetty (Lancashire) and Kian Roberts (Somerset) made their List A debuts.

10 August 2025
11:00
Scorecard

Warwickshire; 291/8 (50 overs)	v	Northamptonshire; 229 (42.4 overs)
Alex Davies 123 (123); Luke Procter 2/46 (9 overs)		George Bartlett 47 (57); Tazeem Ali 5/43 (10 overs)

Warwickshire won by 62 runs
Rugby School Ground, Rugby
Umpires: Anthony Harris and Sue Redfern

- Warwickshire won the toss and elected to bat.
- Tazeem Ali (Warwickshire) took his maiden five-wicket haul in List A cricket.

12 August 2025
11:00
Scorecard

Lancashire; 294/7 (50 overs)	v	Yorkshire; 295/3 (46.5 overs)
Michael Jones 102 (88); Jack White 2/66 (9 overs)		Imam-ul-Haq 117 (124); Arav Shetty 1/35 (6 overs)

Yorkshire won by 7 wickets
Clifton Park Ground, York
Umpires: Paul Baldwin and Graham Lloyd

- Yorkshire won the toss and elected to field.

13 August 2025
11:00
Scorecard

Durham; 387/4 (50 overs)	v	Middlesex; 390/5 (48 overs)
Alex Lees 138* (132); Henry Brookes 2/67 (9 overs)		Sam Robson 169* (139); Archie Bailey 2/83 (10 overs)

Middlesex won by 5 wickets
Riverside Ground, Chester-le-Street
Umpires: Naeem Ashraf and Tom Lungley

- Middlesex won the toss and elected to field.
- Archie Bailey (Durham) made his List A debut.

13 August 2025
11:00
Scorecard

Leicestershire; 333/8 (50 overs)	v	Nottinghamshire; 209 (38 overs)
Sol Budinger 102 (80); Joe Pocklington 2/45 (10 overs)		Jack Haynes 56 (62); Liam Trevaskis 5/52 (10 overs)

Leicestershire won by 124 runs
Kibworth Cricket Club New Ground, Kibworth
Umpires: Jack Shantry and Anthony Harris

- Leicestershire won the toss and elected to bat.
- Liam Trevaskis (Leicestershire) took his 50th wicket in List A cricket and also took his maiden five-wicket haul in List A cricket.

13 August 2025
11:00
Scorecard

Glamorgan; 308/7 (50 overs)	v	Surrey; 146/5 (15.3 overs)
Will Smale 105* (106); Nathan Barnwell 3/55 (10 overs)		Ben Foakes 43* (17); Andy Gorvin 2/31 (3 overs)

Surrey won by 5 wickets (DLS method)
The Oval, London
Umpires: Ben Debenham and James Tredwell

- Surrey won the toss and elected to field.
- Surrey were set a revised target of 146 runs in 16 overs due to rain.
- Will Smale (Glamorgan) scored his first century in List A cricket.

13 August 2025
11:00
Scorecard

Warwickshire; 283/9 (50 overs)	v	Kent; 204 (40.5 overs)
Ed Barnard 60 (68); Grant Stewart 2/33 (7 overs)		Jaydn Denly 52 (58); Tazeem Ali 5/54 (8.5 overs)

Warwickshire won by 79 runs
Rugby School Ground, Rugby
Umpires: Neil Pratt Chris Watt

- Warwickshire won the toss and elected to bat.
- Ben Dawkins (Kent) and Adam Sylvester (Warwickshire) both made their List A debut.
- Ed Barnard (Warwickshire) scored his 2,000th run in List A cricket.

13 August 2025
11:00
Scorecard

Hampshire; 194 (41.5 overs)	v	Worcestershire; 196/5 (40.1 overs)
Nick Gubbins 60 (71); Ben Allison 6/35 (9.5 overs)		Brett D'Oliveira 52 (83); Eddie Jack 2/34 (9 overs)

Worcestershire won by 5 wickets
New Road, Worcester
Umpires: David Millns and Sue Redfern

- Hampshire won the toss and elected to bat.
- Ben Allison (Worcestershire) took his maiden five-wicket haul in List A cricket.

14 August 2025
11:00
Scorecard

Yorkshire; 247 (48.4 overs)	v	Somerset; 252/4 (49.1 overs)
Matt Revis 85 (85); Jake Ball 4/34 (9.4 overs)		Archie Vaughan 95 (127); Matt Revis 2/30 (4 overs)

Somerset won by 6 wickets
Clifton Park Ground, York
Umpires: Hassan Adnan and Peter Hartley

- Somerset won the toss and elected to field.
- James Theedom (Somerset) made his List A debut.

15 August 2025
11:00
Scorecard

Derbyshire; 315 (47.1 overs)	v	Worcestershire; 316/6 (48.1 overs)
Caleb Jewell 113 (107); Khurram Shahzad 3/49 (8.1 overs)		Brett D'Oliveira 138 (118); Rory Haydon 3/59 (10 overs)

Worcestershire won by 4 wickets
Repton School, Repton
Umpires: Ben Debenham and David Millns

- Worcestershire won the toss and elected to field.
- Dan Lategan (Worcestershire) made his List A debut.

15 August 2025
11:00
Scorecard

Northamptonshire; 321/8 (50 overs)	v	Durham; 171 (31.2 overs)
James Sales 117 (110); Paul Coughlin 2/39 (9 overs)		Ben Raine 31* (24); Yuzvendra Chahal 3/30 (6 overs)

Northamptonshire won by 150 runs
Riverside Ground, Chester-le-Street
Umpires: Bilal Shafayat and Simon Widdup

- Northamptonshire won the toss and elected to bat.
- Nirvan Ramesh (Northamptonshire) and Robbie Bowman (Durham) both made their List A debut.

15 August 2025
11:00
Scorecard

Essex; 417/6 (50 overs)	v	Surrey; 173 (37.4 overs)
Curtis Campher 123* (68); Alex French 2/81 (10 overs)		Cameron Steel 49 (69); Charlie Bennett 5/36 (9.4 overs)

Essex won by 244 runs
County Ground, Chelmsford
Umpires: Phil Mustard and Nigel Llong

- Surrey won the toss and elected to field.
- Charlie Bennett (Essex) took his first five-wicket haul in List A cricket.

15 August 2025
14:00 (D/N)
Scorecard

Glamorgan; 288/9 (50 overs)	v	Gloucestershire; 289/5 (46.4 overs)
Eddie Byrom 94 (108); Graeme van Buuren 3/33 (10 overs)		Cameron Bancroft 143* (144); James Harris 2/45 (10 overs)

Gloucestershire won by 5 wickets
County Ground, Bristol
Umpires: Ian Blackwell and Sue Redfern

- Gloucestershire won the toss and elected to field.

15 August 2025
11:00
Scorecard

Leicestershire; 252 (48.4 overs)	v	Hampshire; 253/3 (43.3 overs)
Sol Budinger 65 (57); Kyle Abbott 3/36 (10 overs)		Ali Orr 131 (141); Ben Mike 1/25 (4 overs)

Hampshire won by 7 wickets
Rose Bowl, Southampton
Umpires: James Tredwell and Anthony Harris

- Leicestershire won the toss and elected to bat.

15 August 2025
14:00 (D/N)
Scorecard

Lancashire; 338/7 (50 overs)	v	Sussex; 342/9 (49.3 overs)
Michael Jones 82 (77); Henry Crocombe 3/61 (10 overs)		Tom Clark 139 (109); Charlie Barnard 4/56 (6.3 overs)

Sussex won by 1 wicket
County Ground, Hove
Umpires: Neil Bainton and Chris Watts

- Sussex won the toss and elected to field.

15 August 2025
11:00
Scorecard

Middlesex; 217 (48 overs)	v	Warwickshire; 189 (46.4 overs)
Ben Geddes 48 (57); Jake Lintott 5/37 (10 overs)		Hamza Shaikh 42 (72); Luke Hollman 4/27 (10 overs)

Middlesex won by 28 runs
Rugby School Ground, Rugby
Umpires: Naeem Ashraf and Steve O'Shaughnessy

- Middlesex won the toss and elected to bat.

17 August 2025
11:00
Scorecard

Glamorgan; 278/9 (50 overs)	v	Nottinghamshire; 282/3 (46.3 overs)
Eddie Byrom 62 (72); Robert Lord 2/50 (10 overs)		Jack Haynes 124 (103); Asa Tribe 1/17 (3 overs)

Nottinghamshire won by 7 wickets
Sophia Gardens, Cardiff
Umpires: Mike Burns and Sam Hollingshed

- Nottinghamshire won the toss and elected to field.
- Byron Hatton-Lowe (Nottinghamshire) made his List A debut.

17 August 2025
11:00
Scorecard

Kent; 315/8 (50 overs)	v	Lancashire; 293 (47.3 overs)
Jaydn Denly 91 (95); Tom Bailey 2/54 (10 overs)		Josh Bohannon 133 (110); Matt Parkinson 3/57 (9.3 overs)

Kent won by 22 runs
County Ground, Beckenham
Umpires: Anthony Harris and Nigel Llong

- Lancashire won the toss and elected to foeld.

17 August 2025
11:00
Scorecard

Essex; 321/8 (50 overs)	v	Leicestershire; 261 (49.3 overs)
Matt Critchley 103 (116); Ian Holland 3/34 (10 overs)		Shan Masood 103 (127); Luc Benkenstein 3/53 (7.3 overs)

Essex won by 60 runs
Grace Road, Leicester
Umpires: Michael Gough and Simon Widdup

- Leicestershire won the toss and elected to field.
- Matt Critchley (Essex) scored his first century in List A cricket.

17 August 2025
11:00
Scorecard

Middlesex; 129 (31 overs)	v	Yorkshire; 130/3 (27 overs)
Sam Robson 28 (37); Matt Milnes 4/29 (8 overs)		Imam-ul-Haq 54* (56); Henry Brookes 3/17 (6 overs)

Yorkshire won by 7 wickets
Brunton Memorial Ground, Radlett
Umpires: Hassan Adnan and Graeme Cross

- Middelesex won the toss and elected to bat.

17 August 2025
11:00
Scorecard

Northamptonshire; 295/8 (50 overs)	v	Sussex; 297/3 (46.5 overs)
James Sales 98 (96); Danny Lamb 2/43 (8 overs)		Charlie Tear 159 (146); George Bartlett 1/17 (4.5 overs)

Sussex won by 7 wickets
County Ground, Northampton
Umpires: Naeem Ashraf and Chris Watts

- Northamptonshire won the toss and elected to bat.
- Stuart van der Merwe and Ben Whitehouse (Northamptonshire) both made their List A debuts.
- Charlie Tear (Sussex) scored his first century in List A cricket.

17 August 2025
11:00
Scorecard

Somerset; 309/8 (50 overs)	v	Warwickshire; 310/7 (49.3 overs)
Tom Lammonby 100 (111); Michael Booth 2/39 (10 overs)		Jake Lintott 50 (36); Ben Green 3/65 (10 overs)

Warwickshire won by 3 wickets
County Ground, Taunton
Umpires: James Tredwell and Mohammed Waseem

- Warwickshire won the toss and elected to field.
- Tom Lammonby (Somerset) scored his first century in List A cricket.

17 August 2025
11:00
Scorecard

Worcestershire; 237/8 (50 overs)	v	Gloucestershire; 240/4 (42.5 overs)
Kashif Ali 36 (49); Daaryoush Ahmed 2/21 (6 overs)		Ollie Price 66 (77); Khurram Shahzad 2/27 (8 overs)

Gloucestershire won by 6 wickets
New Road, Worcester
Umpires: Connor McGarry and Russell Warren

- Gloucestershire won the toss and elected to field.

18 August 2025
11:00
Scorecard

Surrey; 160 (46.3 overs)	v	Hampshire; 162/1 (19.1 overs)
Nikhil Gorantla 22 (25); James Fuller 4/34 (9.3 overs)		Nick Gubbins 87* (60); Alex French 1/40 (6 overs)

Hampshire won by 9 wickets
The Oval, London
Umpires: Rob Bailey and Bilal Shafayat

- Hampshire won the toss and elected to field.

19 August 2025
11:00
Scorecard

Kent; 279/6 (50 overs)	v	Middlesex; 283/4 (45 overs)
Jack Leaning 63* (48); Henry Brookes 3/47 (10 overs)		Ben Geddes 141* (119); Ekansh Singh 1/23 (4 overs)

Middlesex won by 6 wickets
Brunton Memorial Ground, Radlett
Umpires: James Tredwell and Rob White

- Middlesex won the toss and elected to field.
- Corey Flintoff (Kent) and Sebastian Morgan (Middlesex) both made their List A debuts.
- Ben Geddes (Middlesex) scored his maiden century in List A cricket.

20 August 2025
14:00 (D/N)
Scorecard

Essex; 371/6 (50 overs)	v	Glamorgan; 181 (32.2 overs)
Tom Westley 141 (113); Zain-ul-Hassan 3/60 (10 overs)		Asa Tribe 71 (79); Simon Harmer 5/47 (10 overs)

Essex won by 190 runs
County Ground, Chelmsford
Umpires: James Middlebrook and Simon Widdup

- Essex won the toss and elected to bat.
- Simon Harmer (Essex) took his maiden five-wicket haul in List A cricket.

20 August 2025
11:00
Scorecard

Hampshire; 290/7 (50 overs)	v	Nottinghamshire; 292/6 (48.4 overs)
Nick Gubbins 144* (126); Joe Pocklington 3/28 (10 overs)		Jack Haynes 97 (89); Eddie Jack 3/70 (9.4 overs)

Nottinghamshire won by 4 wickets
Rose Bowl, Southampton
Umpires: James Tredwell and Casper Viljoen

- Nottinghamshire won the toss and elected to field.

20 August 2025
11:00
Scorecard

Lancashire; 320 (49.5 overs)	v	Durham; 321/6 (48.3 overs)
Josh Bohannon 106 (102); Ben Raine 4/34 (9.5 overs)		Ollie Robinson 80* (59); Tom Aspinwall 3/59 (10 overs)

Durham won by 4 wickets
Aigburth Cricket Ground, Liverpool
Umpires: Naeem Ashraf and Neil Pratt

- Durham won the toss and elected to field.
- George Bell (Lancashire) scored his first century in List A cricket.

20 August 2025
11:00
Scorecard

Leicestershire; 321/5 (50 overs)	v	Derbyshire; 312 (50 overs)
Rishi Patel 94 (119); Rory Haydon 1/11 (3 overs)		Harry Came 67 (72); Alex Green 5/64 (10 overs)

Match tied
Grace Road, Leicester
Umpires: Neil Bainton and Ben Peverall

- Derbyshire won the toss and elected to field.

21 August 2025
11:00
Scorecard

Northamptonshire; 243 (47.2 overs)	v	Kent; 247/3 (44.4 overs)
Aadi Sharma 82 (90); Joey Evison 3/36 (10 overs)		Ben Dawkins 111* (105); Nirvan Ramesh 1/13 (4 overs)

Kent won by 7 wickets
County Ground, Northampton
Umpires: Anthony Harris and Mohammed Waseem

- Northamptonshire won the toss and elected to bat.
- Aryaman Varma (Northamptonshire) made his List A debut.
- Ben Dawkins (Kent) scored his first century in List A cricket.

21 August 2025
11:00
Scorecard

Somerset; 243 (47.3 overs)	v	Sussex; 153 (36 overs)
Finley Hill 55 (68); Sean Hunt 3/35 (10 overs)		Jack Carson 35 (34); Tom Lammonby 5/20 (7 overs)

Somerset won by 90 runs
County Ground, Hove
Umpires: Rob Bailey and Sam Hollingshead

- Sussex won the toss and elected to field.
- Tom Lammonby (Somerset) took his maiden five-wicket haul in List A cricket.

22 August 2025
11:00
Scorecard

Surrey; 388/4 (50 overs)	v	Derbyshire; 345 (49 overs)
Adam Thomas 162 (149); Zak Chappell 3/61 (10 overs)		Matt Montgomery 114 (110); Yousef Majid 3/57 (10 overs)

Surrey won by 43 runs
County Ground, Derby
Umpires: Surendiran Shanmugam and Rob White

- Surrey won the toss and elected to bat.
- Ralphie Albert and Ollie Hunt (Surrey) both made their List A debuts.
- Adam Thomas and Ollie Skyes (Surrey) both scored their first century in List A cricket.

22 August 2025
11:00
Scorecard

Lancashire; 249/9 (50 overs)	v	Warwickshire; 253/5 (39.5 overs)
George Bell 46 (57); Tazeem Ali 3/39 (10 overs)		Hamza Shaikh 75 (94); Jack Blatherwick 4/48 (10 overs)

Warwickshire won by 5 wickets
Aigburth Cricket Ground, Liverpool
Umpires: Bilal Shafayat and Jack Shantry

- Lancashire won the toss and elected to bat.

22 August 2025
11:00
Scorecard

Gloucestershire; 343/7 (50 overs)	v	Nottinghamshire; 291 (47.2 overs)
James Bracey 186 (150); Robert Lord 2/60 (10 overs)		Haseeb Hameed 80 (88); Matthew Taylor 2/38 (8 overs)

Gloucestershire won by 52 runs
Trent Bridge, Nottingham
Umpires: Phil Mustard and Ben Peverall

- Nottinghamshire won the toss and elected to field.

22 August 2025
11:00
Scorecard

Worcestershire; 297/7 (50 overs)	v	Glamorgan; 298/5 (48.2 overs)
Asa Tribe 122* (125); Brett D'Oliveira 2/46 (8 overs)		Rob Jones 110* (108); James Harris 2/57 (9 overs)

Worcestershire won by 5 wickets
New Road, Worcester
Umpires: Paul Baldwin and Tom Lungley

- Worcestershire won the toss and elected to field.

22 August 2025
11:00
Scorecard

Yorkshire; 354/7 (50 overs)	v	Durham; 142 (36 overs)
Finlay Bean 102* (57); Sam Conners 2/71 (10 overs)		George Drissell 46 (62); Jack White 3/24 (8 overs)

Yorkshire won by 212 runs
North Marine Road Ground, Scarborough
Umpires: Graeme Cross and Steve O'Shaughnessy

- Durham won the toss and elected to field.
- Finlay Bean (Yorkshire) scored his first century in List A cricket.

24 August 2025
11:00
Scorecard

Durham; 300/8 (50 overs)	v	Warwickshire; 303/6 (47.4 overs)
Alex Lees 148 (142); Ed Barnard 2/48 (10 overs)		Ed Barnard 141* (120); Ben Raine 3/51 (9 overs)

Warwickshire won by 4 wickets
Riverside Ground, Chester-le-Street
Umpires: Naeem Ashraf and Michael Gough

- Warwickshire won the toss and elected to field.

24 August 2025
11:00
Scorecard

Essex; 289 (49 overs)	v	Gloucestershire; 159 (35.1 overs)
Tom Westley 92 (103); Jack Taylor 5/61 (10 overs)		James Bracey 37 (45); Matt Critchley 3/27 (5 overs)

Essex won by 130 runs
County Ground, Chelmsford
Umpires: Paul Baldwin and Mohammed Waseem

- Essex won the toss and elected to bat.
- Jack Taylor (Gloucestershire) took his maiden five-wicket haul in List A cricket.

24 August 2025
11:00
Scorecard

Derbyshire; 339/5 (50 overs)	v	Hampshire; 341/7 (49.1 overs)
Caleb Jewell 98 (96); Kyle Abbott 2/33 (10 overs)		Ben Mayes 62* (53); Ben Aitchison 3/50 (10 overs)

Hampshire won by 3 wickets
Rose Bowl, Southampton
Umpires: Graeme Cross and Mark Newell

- Hampshire won the toss and elected to field.

24 August 2025
11:00
Scorecard

Kent; 269/9 (50 overs)	v	Somerset; 270/6 (44.3 overs)
Jaydn Denly 65 (72); Jack Leach 2/37 (10 overs)		Tom Lammonby 102 (104); Jaydn Denly 2/41 (7.3 overs)

Somerset won by 4 wickets
St Lawrence Ground, Canterbury
Umpires: Phil Mustard and Ben Peverall

- Kent won the toss and elected to bat.
- Oliver Curtiss (Kent) made his List A debut.

24 August 2025
11:00
Scorecard

Worcestershire; 328 (49.3 overs)	v	Leicestershire; 312/9 (50 overs)
Brett D'Oliveira 107 (105); Rishi Patel 5/65 (8.2 overs)		Shan Masood 88 (87); Ben Allison 3/87 (10 overs)

Worcestershire won by 16 runs
Grace Road, Leicester
Umpires: Anthony Harris and Simon Widdup

- Worcestershire won the toss and elected to bat.
- Rishi Patel (Leicestershire) took his maiden five-wicket haul in List A cricket.

24 August 2025
11:00
Scorecard

Northamptonshire; 189 (38.1 overs)	v	Middlesex; 192/6 (32.3 overs)
Ricardo Vasconcelos 62 (61); Zafar Gohar 4/39 (10 overs)		Sam Robson 67 (70); Liam Guthrie 2/57 (10 overs)

Middlesex won by 4 wickets
County Ground, Northampton
Umpires: Tom Lungley and Casper Viljoen

- Middlesex won the toss and elected to field.

24 August 2025
11:00
Scorecard

Surrey; 289/8 (50 overs)	v	Nottinghamshire; 279/9 (50 overs)
Ralphie Albert 95 (75); Byron Hatton-Lowe 3/63 (8 overs)		Robert Lord 72* (42); Ollie Sykes 3/44 (9 overs)

Surrey won by 10 runs
Trent Bridge, Nottingham
Umpires: Bilal Shafayat and Chirs Watts

- Surrey won the toss and elected to bat.
- Tom Giles (Nottinghamshire) made his List A debut.

24 August 2025
11:00
Scorecard

Sussex; 284/9 (50 overs)	v	Yorkshire; 286/4 (47.4 overs)
Oli Carter 94 (79); Matt Milnes 7/38 (10 overs)		Imam-ul-Haq 106 (105); Fynn Hudson-Prentice 2/54 (9 overs)

Yorkshire won by 6 wickets
County Ground, Hove
Umpires: Connor McGarry and Surendiran Shanmugam

- Sussex won the toss and elected to bat.

26 August 2025
11:00
Scorecard

Essex; 366/6 (50 overs)	v	Derbyshire; 322 (47.3 overs)
Tom Westley 118 (110); Zak Chappell 2/64 (10 overs)		Harry Came 139 (120); Matt Critchley 3/63 (8 overs)

Essex won by 44 runs
County Ground, Derby
Umpires: Paul Baldwin and Tom Lungley

- Essex won the toss and elected to bat.

26 August 2025
11:00
Scorecard

Leicestershire; 274 (49.4 overs)	v	Glamorgan; 278/3 (45.4 overs)
Lewis Hill 81 (88); Tom Norton 3/41 (10 overs)		Asa Tribe 131* (132); Alex Green 2/71 (9 overs)

Glamorgan won by 7 wickets
Sophia Gardens, Cardiff
Umpires: Neil Bainton and Mohammed Waseem

- Tom Norton (Glamorgan) made his List A debut.

26 August 2025
11:00
Scorecard

Gloucestershire; 313/7 (49 overs)	v	Hampshire; 315/5 (47.4 overs)
Ben Charlesworth 104 (83); Keith Barker 3/52 (10 overs)		Fletcha Middleton 92 (95); Matthew Taylor 2/65 (10 overs)

Hampshire won by 5 wickets (DLS method)
County Ground, Bristol
Umpires: Sam Hollingshead and Ben Peverall

- Hampshire won the toss and elected to field.
- The match was reduced to 49 overs per side due to rain.
- Ben Charlesworth (Gloucestershire) scored his first century in List A cricket.

26 August 2025
11:00
Scorecard

Yorkshire; 301/9 (50 overs)	v	Kent; 225 (44.2 overs)
James Wharton 118 (106); Ekansh Singh 3/42 (8 overs)		Jaydn Denly 79 (81); Dom Bess 4/43 (9 overs)

Yorkshire won by 76 runs
St Lawrence Ground, Canterbury
Umpires: Anna Harris and Martin Saggers

- Yorkshire won the toss and elected to field.
- Will Bennison and Matthew Firbank (Yorkshire) both made their List A debuts.
- James Wharton (Yorkshire) scored his first century in List A cricket.

26 August 2025
11:00
Scorecard

Lancashire; 291/8 (50 overs)	v	Middlesex; 292/9 (49.5 overs)
Marcus Harris 64 (90); Luke Hollman 2/30 (10 overs)		Nathan Fernandes 92 (79); Harry Singh 4/27 (10 overs)

Middlesex won by 1 wicket
Old Trafford, Manchester
Umpires: Phil Mustard and Simon Widdup

- Lancashire won the toss and elected to bat.

26 August 2025
11:00
Scorecard

Northamptonshire; 238 (43.2 overs)	v	Somerset; 240/2 (42.4 overs)
Tim Robinson 69 (58); Kasey Aldridge 4/54 (10 overs)		Archie Vaughan 109* (122); Stuart van der Merwe 1/43 (6.4 overs)

Somerset won by 8 wickets (DLS method)
County Ground, Taunton
Umpires: Ian Blackwell and Casper Viljoen

- Northamptonshire won the toss and elected to bat.
- The match was reduced to 47 overs per side due to rain.
- Somerset were set a revised target of 240 runs from 47 overs due to rain.
- Archie Vaughan (Somerset) scored his first century in List A cricket.

26 August 2025
11:00
Scorecard

Sussex; 277/9 (48 overs)	v	Warwickshire; 258 (45.1 overs)
Tom Clark 82 (77); Oliver Hannon-Dalby 3/53 (9 overs)		Ed Barnard 82 (75); Archie Lenham 5/48 (10 overs)

Sussex won by 21 runs (DLS method)
Edgbaston, Birmingham
Umpires: Graeme Cross and Anthony Harris

- The match was reduced to 48 overs per side due to rain.
- Troy Henry (Sussex) made his List A debut.
- Archie Lenham (Sussex) took his maiden five-wicket haul in List A cricket.

26 August 2025
11:00
Scorecard

Surrey; 266/6 (49 overs)	v	Worcestershire; 269/4 (39.4 overs)
Gus Atkinson 60 (48); Khurram Shahzad 2/46 (10 overs)		Kashif Ali 80 (58); Ollie Sykes 2/21 (3 overs)

Worcestershire won by 6 wickets (DLS method)
New Road, Worcester
Umpires: Connor McGarry and Jack Shantry

- Worcestershire won the toss and elected to field.
- The match was reduced to 49 overs per side due to rain.

== Knockout stage ==
The winner of each group will progress straight to the semi-finals, with the second and third placed teams playing a play-off match against a team from the other group which will make up the play-offs. The winner of each play-off will play one of the group winners in the semi-finals.

=== Bracket ===
Quarter-finals
B2	Somerset	149/4 (31.3 overs)
A3	Gloucestershire	155 (40.5 overs)
A2	Hampshire	229/9 (50 overs)
B3	Middlesex	187 (45.3 overs)

Semi-finals
A1	Worcestershire	275/9 (50 overs)
QF2	Somerset	141 (29.2 overs)
B1	Yorkshire	235/8 (41 overs)
QF1	Hampshire	304/6 (50 overs)

Final
SF1	Worcestershire	188/7 (26.4 overs)
SF2	Hampshire	237/7 (45 overs)

=== Quarter-finals ===
28 August 2025
11:00
Scorecard

Hampshire; 229/9 (50 overs)	v	Middlesex; 187 (45.3 overs)
Ali Orr 108 (140); Henry Brookes 2/53 (10 overs)		Sam Robson 48 (70); Liam Dawson 4/33 (9.3 overs)

Hampshire won by 42 runs
Brunton Memorial Ground, Radlett
Umpires: Paul Baldwin and Ben Peverall

- Middlesex won the toss and elected to field.

28 August 2025
11:00
Scorecard

Gloucestershire; 155 (40.5 overs)	v	Somerset; 149/4 (31.3 overs)
Jack Taylor 43 (59); Tom Lammonby 3/22 (6 overs)		James Rew 46 (52); Craig Miles 1/15 (4 overs)

Somerset won by 6 wickets (DLS method)
County Ground, Taunton
Umpires: Ian Blackwell and Simon Widdup

- Gloucestershire won the toss and elected to bat.
- Somerset were set a revised target of 149 runs in 45 overs due to rain.

=== Semi-finals ===
31 August 2025
11:00
Scorecard

Worcestershire; 275/9 (50 overs)	v	Somerset; 141 (29.2 overs)
Daniel Lategan 78 (82); Ben Green 4/52 (10 overs)		James Rew 47 (55); Khurram Shahzad 4/36 (7 overs)

Worcestershire won by 131 runs (DLS method)
New Road, Worcester
Umpires: Mark Newell and James Tredwell

- Somerset won the toss and elected to field.
- Somerset were set a revised target of 273 runs in 38 overs due to rain.

31 August 2025
11:00
Scorecard

Hampshire; 304/6 (50 overs)	v	Yorkshire; 235/8 (41 overs)
Liam Dawson 142 (116); Matt Milnes 3/73 (10 overs)		Imam-ul-Haq 105 (97); Scott Currie 2/47 (8 overs)

Hampshire won by 18 runs (DLS method)
North Marine Road Ground, Scarborough
Umpires: Neil Pratt and Surendiran Shanmugam

- Yorkshire won the toss and elected to field.
- Yorkshire were set a revised target of 254 runs in 41 overs due to rain.

=== Final ===
20 September 2025
11:00
Scorecard

Hampshire; 237/7 (45 overs)	v	Worcestershire; 188/7 (26.4 overs)
Ali Orr 110 (130); Matthew Waite 3/60 (9 overs)		Ethan Brookes 57 (34); Scott Currie 5/34 (6 overs)

Worcestershire won by 3 wickets (DLS method)
Trent Bridge, Nottingham
Umpires: Ben Debenham and Neil Pratt
Player of the match: Ethan Brookes (Worcestershire)

- Worcestershire won the toss and elected to field.
- The match was reduced to 45 overs per side due to rain.
- The second innings was reduced to 27 overs due to rain and Worcestershire were set a revised target of 188 runs.
- Scott Currie (Hampshire) took his maiden five-wicket haul in List A cricket.

== See also ==
- 2025 Women's One-Day Cup
