= Caires =

Caires or De Caires may refer to:

- Caires, Portugal, a parish in Amares municipality
- David de Caires (1936–2008), Guyanese solicitor
- Frank De Caires (1909–1959), British Guianese cricketer
- José Alfredo Caires de Nobrega (born 1951), the bishop of the Diocese of Mananjary, Madagascar
- Josh de Caires (born 2002), English cricketer
- Samuel Caires (born 2003), Brazilian politician

== See also ==
- Caire (disambiguation)
