= Caire =

Caire may refer to:

- Éric Caire (born 1965), a politician from Quebec, Canada
- Louise Caire Clark (born 1949), an American actress
- Banque du Caire or "Bank of Cairo", a full service bank headquartered in Cairo, Egypt

Places

- Cairo, Caire is the French name for Cairo.
- Chefe Caire, a village in Ancuabe District in Cabo Delgado Province in northeastern Mozambique
- Faucon-du-Caire, a commune in the Alpes-de-Haute-Provence department in southeastern France
- La Motte-du-Caire, a commune in the Alpes-de-Haute-Provence département in southeastern France
- Le Caire, a commune in the Alpes-de-Haute-Provence department in southeastern France
- Ouvrage Col du Caire Gros, a lesser work (perit ouvrage) of the Maginot Line 's Alpine extension, the Alpine Line

== See also ==
- Caires (disambiguation)
