= Frank de Caires =

West Indian cricketer

Frank De Caires
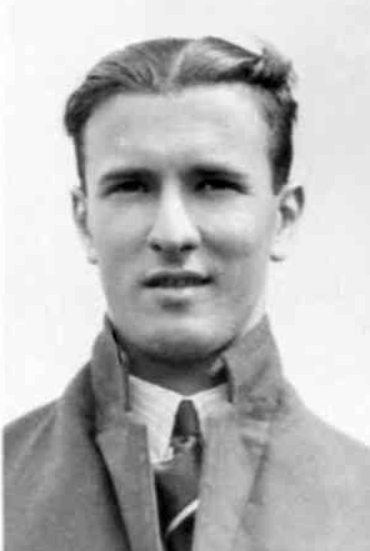
- Frank de Caires in 1930

Personal information
- Full name: Francis Ignatius de Caires
- Born: 12 May 1909; British Guiana
- Died: 2 February 1959 (aged 49); British Guiana
- Batting: Right-handed
- Bowling: Right-arm
- Relatives: David de Caires (son); Josh de Caires (great-grandson)

International information
- National side: West Indies
- Test debut (cap 16): 11 January 1930 v England
- Last Test: 3 April 1930 v England

Domestic team information
- Years: Team
- 1928–1938: British Guiana

Career statistics
Competition	Test	First-class
Matches	3	18
Runs scored	232	945
Batting average	38.66	28.63
100s/50s	0/2	1/7
Top score	80	133
Balls bowled	12	66
Wickets	0	1
Bowling average	–	48.00
5 wickets in innings	–	0
10 wickets in match	–	0
Best bowling	–	1/20
Catches/stumpings	1/–	7/–
- Source: CricketArchive, 3 November 2010

Francis Ignatius de Caires (12 May 1909 – 2 February 1959) was a British Guianese cricketer who played three Test matches for West Indies in the 1930s.

De Caires, who was of Portuguese descent, was born in British Guiana and developed into a sound right-handed batsman who made his first-class debut for British Guiana against Trinidad at Port of Spain in the 1928/29 Inter-Colonial Tournament, a match Trinidad won comfortably despite de Caires top-scoring in the visitor's first innings.

When Marylebone Cricket Club (MCC) toured the Caribbean the following season, de Caires was selected for three of the four Test matches, including the inaugural one by the West Indies on home soil, played at Bridgetown, Barbados, in January 1930. De Caires scored 80 runs in the first innings and 70 in the second to earn his side a creditable draw. Later that year he was selected for the first tour of Australia by a West Indian Test team but did not play in any of the five Test matches.

== Personal life ==
He was a director of the family company, De Caires Bros Ltd. His son David was a lawyer and founder and editor-in-chief of Stabroek News. David's daughter Isabelle is married to former English Test captain Mike Atherton.
