= Ollie Sykes (cricketer) =

English cricketer (born 2005)

Personal information
- Full name: Oliver Findlay Mortimer Sykes
- Born: 6 March 2005 (age 21); Wandsworth, London, England
- Height: 6 ft 2 in (1.88 m)
- Batting: Left-handed
- Bowling: Right-arm medium

Domestic team information
- Years: Team
- 2024–present: Surrey (squad no. 54)
- 2026: MI London
- First-class debut: 26 September 2024 Surrey v Essex
- List A debut: 6 August 2024 Surrey v Leicestershire

Career statistics
Competition	FC	LA	T20
Matches	3	18	14
Runs scored	54	654	111
Batting average	13.50	40.87	13.87
100s/50s	0/0	1/4	0/0
Top score	37	115	44*
Balls bowled	66	234	–
Wickets	0	8	–
Bowling average	–	29.25	–
5 wickets in innings	–	0	–
10 wickets in match	–	0	–
Best bowling	–	3/44	–
Catches/stumpings	1/–	4/–	6/–
- Source: CricInfo, 12 September 2026

Oliver Findlay Mortimer Sykes (born 6 March 2005) is an English cricketer who plays for Surrey County Cricket Club. He is a left-handed batsman and right arm medium pace bowler.

== Early life ==
Sykes attended Dulwich Prep London followed by Tonbridge School. In 2024, he was named Wisden Schools Cricketer of the Year after taking 30 wickets and scoring 935 runs for Tonbridge in the 2023 summer.

== Career ==
Sykes joined the Surrey Academy in May 2023. In July 2024, he signed a rookie contract with Surrey. He made his T20 debut for Surrey in the 2024 T20 Blast against Kent Spitfires on 7 July 2024. He made his List A debut for Surrey on 6 August 2024 in the One-Day Cup against Leicestershire. He scored his first half century when striking 87 from 56 balls in an unbeaten 150-run partnership with Josh Blake against Essex on 9 August 2024. That month, he scored his maiden century in the One Day Cup for Surrey against Derbyshire. He made his first-class debut along with Josh Blake and Yousef Majid, for Surrey in the 2024 County Championship on 26 September 2024, against Essex.

In September 2026, Sykes was included in the England Lions cricket team squad for two T20s against Sri Lanka.
