= David de Caires =

Guyanese solicitor (1937–2008)

- Born: 31 December 1937
- Died: 1 November 2008 (aged 70); Barbados
- Education: Stonyhurst College
- Known for: Founding and editing Stabroek News
- Father: Frank De Caires
- Relatives: Michael Atherton (son-in-law); Josh de Caires (grandson)

David de Caires (31 December 1937 – 1 November 2008) was a Guyanese solicitor. He was also the founder and editor-in-chief of Stabroek News.

De Caires' father Francis was a director of the family company, De Caires Bros Ltd, and a Test cricketer for the West Indies in the 1930s. David attended Stonyhurst College in England.

In the early 1960s, de Caires was involved with the New World Group, responsible for publishing New World Quarterly and New World Fortnightly that lasted until 1966. He was a supporter of The United Force, and a supporter of free-market economics.

Trained as a solicitor, de Caires founded Stabroek News in 1986 with the help of his wife and Ken Gordon of the Trinidad and Tobago Express. After Guyana became independent from Britain in 1971, government policies limited the dissemination of information. The government controlled nearly all aspects of media until President Desmond Hoyte enacted various political changes enabling freedom of speech. de Caires was the first to establish an independent, critical newspaper in the country, and often seen as a watershed moment for media freedom in Guyana. In an interview, de Caires said he was most proud of the Stabroek's letters column section: "We get an enormous sackful of letters every week. We have cultivated this by publishing as many as possible. It is the chance for people to be heard. For such a small paper, we get an enormous volume of letters."

De Caires suffered a heart attack on 14 August 2008. He spent time in hospital in Guyana and Trinidad and Tobago. He was later transported to a hospital in Barbados, where he died on the morning of 1 November 2008. He is survived by his sisters Mary and Felicity, widow Doreen, son Brendan, and daughter Isabelle, who is married to the former England cricket captain-turned-journalist Michael Atherton.
