= Ali Orr =

English cricketer (born 2001)

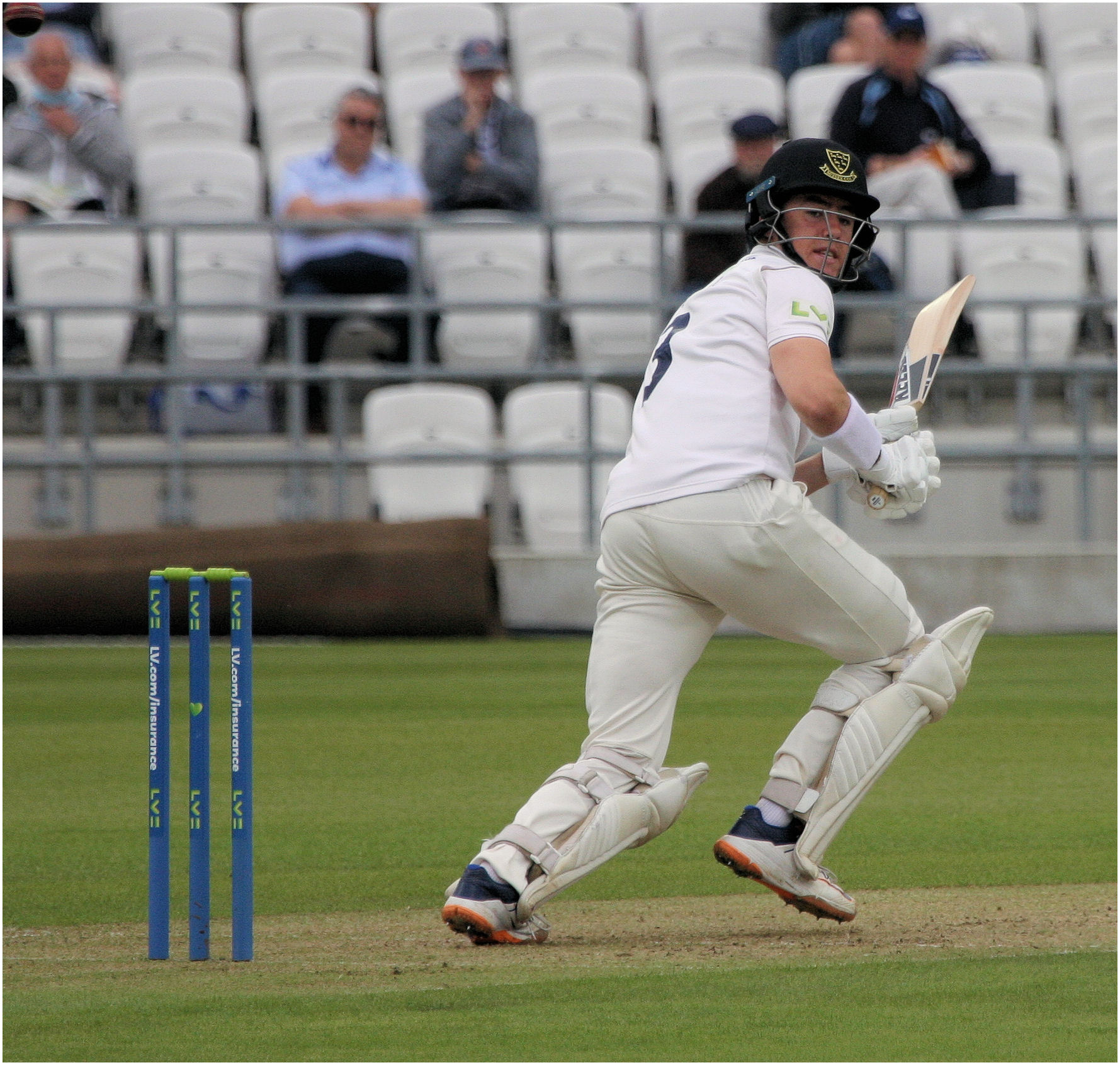
- Orr batting for Sussex in June 2021

Personal information
- Full name: Alistair Graham Hamilton Orr
- Born: 6 April 2001 (age 25); Eastbourne, Sussex, England
- Batting: Left-handed
- Bowling: Right-arm medium
- Role: Top order batsman, Wicket-keeper

Domestic team information
- Years: Team
- 2021–2023: Sussex (squad no. 6)
- 2024–2026: Hampshire
- 2027–present: Middlesex

Career statistics
Competition	FC	LA	T20
Matches	42	33	19
Runs scored	2,551	1,493	300
Batting average	34.01	45.24	15.78
100s/50s	5/9	6/4	0/0
Top score	198	206	41
Catches/stumpings	20/–	13/–	12/–
- Source: Cricinfo, 4 September 2026

Alistair Graham Hamilton Orr (born 6 April 2001) is an English cricketer who plays as a batter for Middlesex. He made his first-class debut on 3 June 2021, for Sussex in the 2021 County Championship. The following month, Orr scored his maiden century in first-class cricket, with 119 runs against Kent.

A former pupil of Bede's School, Eastbourne he also represented Loughborough University. He made his List A debut on 30 July 2021, for Sussex in the 2021 Royal London One-Day Cup. He made his Twenty20 debut on 3 June 2022, for Sussex in the 2022 T20 Blast.

On 20 November 2023 it was announced that Orr signed for Hampshire on a multi-year contract. He scored his first one-day century for Hampshire in August 2025, recording 131 in a 2025 One-Day Cup win against Leicestershire.

After his contract with Hampshire expired in October 2026, Orr joined Middlesex on a three-year deal.
