= Rory Haydon =

English cricketer (born 2003)

Personal information
- Full name: Rory Owen Lewis Haydon
- Born: 26 January 2003 (age 23); Stoke-on-Trent, Staffordshire, England
- Batting: Right-handed
- Bowling: Right-arm medium
- Role: Bowler

Domestic team information
- Years: Team
- 2025–present: Derbyshire (squad no. 95)
- FC debut: 8 September 2025 Derbyshire v Middlesex
- LA debut: 5 August 2025 Derbyshire v Gloucestershire

Career statistics
| Competition | First-class | List A |
|---|---|---|
| Matches | 6 | 8 |
| Runs scored | 8 | 42 |
| Batting average | 2.00 | 14.00 |
| 100s/50s | 0/0 | 0/0 |
| Top score | 7* | 26 |
| Balls bowled | 1,089 | 384 |
| Wickets | 24 | 6 |
| Bowling average | 24.87 | 50.83 |
| 5 wickets in innings | 2 | 0 |
| 10 wickets in match | 1 | 0 |
| Best bowling | 5/81 | 3/59 |
| Catches/stumpings | 2/– | 2/– |
- Source: ESPNcricinfo, 12 August 2026

Rory Owen Lewis Haydon (born 26 January 2003) is an English cricketer who plays for Derbyshire.

== Career ==
Haydon started his cricket career in the Warwickshire academy but left at the end of the 2023 season after not being offered a professional contract. Having been released, Haydon returned to playing National Counties cricket with Staffordshire who he'd previously made his debut for in 2021.

Following a successful trial with the county's Second XI, Haydon signed a short-term contract with Derbyshire for the 2025 One-Day Cup. Haydon made his List A debut for Derbyshire against Gloucestershire on 5 August 2025, claiming his maiden wicket of Australian Test cricketer Cameron Bancroft. On 4 September 2025, Haydon signed a three-year contract with Derbyshire after impressing in the One-Day Cup, claiming six wickets in five appearances, including figures of 3/59. He made his first-class debut in that year's County Championship, for Derbyshire against Middlesex at Lord's on 8 September 2025.
