= Andrew Neal =

English cricketer (born 1999)

Personal information
- Full name: Andrew John Neal
- Born: 11 October 1999 (age 27); Hillingdon, Middlesex, England
- Batting: Right-handed
- Bowling: Left-arm orthodox spin
- Role: Bowler

Domestic team information
- Years: Team
- 2019: Leeds/Bradford MCCU
- 2025–2026: Hampshire (squad no. 17)
- FC debut: 26 March 2019 Leeds/Bradford MCCU v Derbyshire
- LA debut: 5 August 2025 Hampshire v Glamorgan

Career statistics
Competition	FC	LA	T20
Matches	7	19	5
Runs scored	228	319	3
Batting average	16.28	31.90	3.00
100s/50s	0/0	1/0	0/0
Top score	47	110	3
Balls bowled	1,146	1,031	108
Wickets	17	18	6
Bowling average	37.17	46.72	23.33
5 wickets in innings	0	0	0
10 wickets in match	0	0	0
Best bowling	4/98	3/33	3/29
Catches/stumpings	3/–	9/–	2/–
- Source: Cricinfo, 26 September 2026

Andrew John Neal (born 11 October 1999) is an English cricketer. He made his first-class debut on 26 March 2019, for Leeds/Bradford MCCU against Derbyshire, as part of the Marylebone Cricket Club University fixtures.

Neal joined Hampshire on a short-term basis in July 2025. He played 11 One-Day Cup matches, finishing as the team's leading wicket-taker in the competition with 14 scalps and going on to sign a two-year contract with the club in December that year.
