= Stuart van der Merwe =

South African-born cricketer

Personal information
- Full name: Stuart Padraig van der Merwe
- Born: February 24, 2005 (age 21); Centurion, Gauteng, South Africa
- Role: Batter

Domestic team information
- Years: Team
- 2025–2026: Northamptonshire (squad no. 19)
- Only FC: 24 September 2025 Northamptonshire v Leicestershire
- LA debut: 17 August 2025 Northamptonshire v Sussex

Career statistics
Competition	FC	LA
Matches	1	8
Runs scored	121	232
Batting average	60.50	38.66
100s/50s	1/0	0/1
Top score	116	59
Balls bowled	48	100
Wickets	0	2
Bowling average	–	50.00
5 wickets in innings	–	0
10 wickets in match	–	0
Best bowling	–	1/23
Catches/stumpings	0/–	6/–
- Source: ESPNcricinfo, 11 August 2026

Stuart Padraig van der Merwe (born 2005) is a South African-born cricketer who plays for Northamptonshire. He made his List A and first-class debuts for the county in 2025.

== Early life ==
Van der Merwe was born in Centurion, Gauteng, South Africa. He moved to the United Kingdom in 2021 to pursue a professional cricket career.

== Career ==
After trials with several counties, van der Merwe earned a short-term rookie deal with Northamptonshire in 2025. He made his List A debut against Sussex in the 2025 One-Day Cup, scoring 59 runs. In September 2025, Northamptonshire awarded him a two-year rookie contract. Later that month, he made his first-class debut in the 2025 County Championship, scoring 116 in the second innings against Leicestershire. The innings delayed Leicestershire's Division Two title presentation and made him the third Northamptonshire player to score a century on first-class debut.
