= Michael Atherton =

English cricketer, broadcaster, and journalist

Michael Atherton OBE

Personal information
- Full name: Michael Andrew Atherton
- Born: 23 March 1968 (age 58); Failsworth, Lancashire, England
- Nickname: Athers, FEC, Dread, Cockroach, Iron Mike
- Height: 6 ft 0 in (1.83 m)
- Batting: Right-handed
- Bowling: Right arm leg break
- Role: Opening batsman
- Relatives: Josh de Caires (son)
- Website: http://www.mikeatherton.co.uk/

International information
- National side: England (1989–2001)
- Test debut (cap 538): 10 August 1989 v Australia
- Last Test: 27 August 2001 v Australia
- ODI debut (cap 108): 18 July 1990 v India
- Last ODI: 20 August 1998 v Sri Lanka

Domestic team information
- Years: Team
- 1987–1989: Cambridge University
- 1987–2001: Lancashire

Career statistics
Competition	Test	ODI	FC	LA
Matches	115	54	336	287
Runs scored	7,728	1,791	21,929	9,343
Batting average	37.69	35.11	40.83	36.49
100s/50s	16/46	2/12	54/107	14/59
Top score	185*	127	268*	127
Balls bowled	408	–	8,981	812
Wickets	2	–	108	24
Bowling average	151.00	–	43.82	29.62
5 wickets in innings	0	–	3	0
10 wickets in match	0	–	0	0
Best bowling	1/20	–	6/78	4/42
Catches/stumpings	83/–	15/–	268/–	111/–
- Source: ESPNcricinfo, 1 September 2007

Michael Andrew Atherton (born 23 March 1968) is an English broadcaster, journalist, and former cricketer. A right-handed opening batsman for Lancashire and England, and occasional leg-break bowler, he achieved the captaincy of England at the age of 25 and led the side in a then-record 54 Test matches. Known for his stubborn resistance during an era of hostile fast bowling, Atherton was described in 2001 as a determined defensive opener who made "batting look like trench warfare". He had several famed bouts with bowlers including South Africa's Allan Donald and Australia's Glenn McGrath. Atherton often played the anchor role at a time when England batting performances lacked consistency.

His playing career included controversy, including ball tampering, and several brushes with the media with whom, by Atherton's own admission, he did not have a good understanding when he was a player. Often hampered by a chronic back complaint which ultimately ended his career, Atherton was considered a leading England batsman during the 1990s. Following retirement he became a journalist and is a cricket commentator with Sky Sports, and chief cricket correspondent of The Times.

== Early career ==
Atherton was born in Failsworth, Lancashire, England. His family includes several known sportspeople, such as his father Alan, a former Manchester United reserve central defender in the 1960s.

As a youth, he captained the Manchester Grammar School cricket team, for whom he scored almost 3,500 runs and took 170 wickets. His performances led to selection for the England under-19 team, which he captained aged 16. He also represented Lancashire Schools from 1982 to 1986. In 1983 he won the Jack Hobbs Memorial Award as the Outstanding Schoolboy Cricketer at under-15 level. In a (non-first-class) match against the Marylebone Cricket Club in 1984 he took 6–27.

Entering Downing College, Cambridge, to read history, he was selected at 18 to play for Cambridge University Cricket Club and awarded a blue. A year later he made 73 on his county debut for Lancashire, scoring his maiden first-class hundred against Derbyshire a fortnight later. During this time he represented his university, the Combined Universities cricket team (which he captained to the quarter finals of the Benson & Hedges Cup in 1989) and his county. This early rise through the ranks, and extensive leadership experience earned him the nickname "FEC", which is (wrongly) thought to have stood for "future England captain". In his autobiography Opening Up, Atherton is candid about the fact that there are more colourful alternatives for "FEC"; the second word being "educated"; as suggested by his teammates at the time, standing for "f-cking educated c-nt."

== International career ==
Atherton's heady rise continued when he made his debut for England in the fifth test of 1989 against Australia at Trent Bridge, where he scored 0 and 47. Atherton's chance came when several England players announced their decision to go on a rebel tour to South Africa and so were banned from the Test team. Despite these defections, he was selected as vice-captain of the 1989–90 A-team tour to Zimbabwe rather than for the West Indies tour. He learned that he would make his debut when captain David Gower threw a plastic bag of England caps and sweaters at him.

Atherton returned to the England side in the summer of 1990, partnering Graham Gooch at the top of the order and giving the first demonstration of his abilities at international level. In his first innings after recall, and his first opening the batting for England, he scored 151 against New Zealand. He shared an opening partnership of 204 with Gooch against India at Lord's, in the match famous for Gooch's scores of 333 and 123, as well as further big opening partnerships in the next two Tests, and Test centuries against New Zealand and India earned him the title of Young Cricketer of the Year.

During the winter of 1990–91, Atherton faced a sterner test on the Ashes tour of Australia. Although he made a century in the third Test at Sydney, which would prove to be his only century in an Ashes Test, he averaged just 31 for his 279 runs, and England lost 3–0. Atherton struggled against the West Indies in 1991 and missed the 1992 Cricket World Cup and tour of New Zealand with fitness problems, but was recalled to the Test team in the summer of 1992.

When Australia arrived for the 1993 Ashes series, Atherton's place in the team was not assured. However, a consistent summer, during which he scored six 50s in six Tests (including 99 at Lord's), cemented his place in the side at a fortunate time. Graham Gooch, frustrated by continual losses against Australia, resigned as captain after the fourth Test and Atherton, aged just 25, replaced him. He lost his first match in charge but England managed to beat Australia in a morale-boosting final Test; England had not beaten Australia in the previous 18 Test matches.

Atherton's first tour as captain, to the West Indies in the winter of 1993–94, was not a success as England lost 3–1. This was a series of highs and lows: Brian Lara of the West Indies compiled a world-record 375 against them at Antigua; England were bowled out for 46 to lose the third Test (and with it the series) but then roared back at Bridgetown to win the fourth Test thanks to two centuries from Alec Stewart. For his part, Atherton was the best of the English batsmen, scoring 510 runs at an average of 56.67.

Earning plaudits for his determination and leadership, Atherton followed up with two centuries in the three-match series at home against New Zealand. His reputation suffered a blow when he was implicated in a ball-tampering controversy during the first Test against South Africa at Lord's, for which he was fined £2,000 by Ray Illingworth. Atherton was accused of lying to Peter Burge, the match referee. Atherton claims in his autobiography that he answered "no" when asked if he had anything in his pockets. He believed that Burge was referring to nefarious substances such as resin or lip salve. Nonetheless the TV pictures were damning, showing Atherton deliberately putting dirt, taken from the pitch, on the ball. Strictly speaking, Atherton was not breaking the laws – he pointed out that plenty of bowlers improve their grip on the ball by rubbing their hands on the pitch.

After this incident Atherton and England headed to Headingley for the second Test. Atherton played one of his best innings, grinding out 99 before being caught and bowled by Brian McMillan. Atherton stated that this innings was the best answer he could have given to the "gutter press". He led England to a win in the third Test at the Oval, which tied the series, although he failed to score a century.

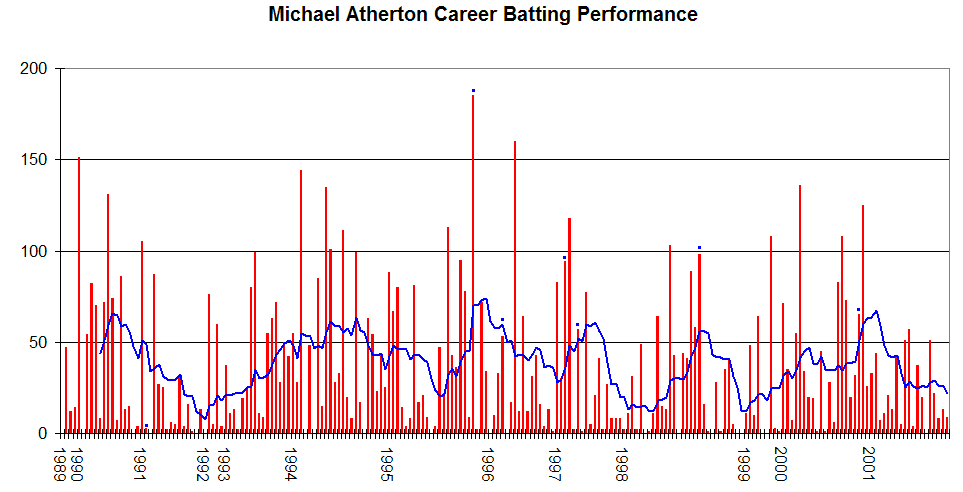
Mike Atherton's Test career performance graph

After winning against South Africa, Atherton faced the supreme test of his leadership: an Ashes tour to Australia. His form stood well, with 407 runs at 40.7, but he was unable to convert any of his four half-centuries in the Test series into a hundred. Although England had a thrilling win at Adelaide, England's first Test victory in Australia for eight years, the team stumbled to a 1–3 loss. There was also controversy in the drawn Sydney test when England's Graeme Hick was approaching what would have been his only Ashes Test hundred. According to Wisden: "In what was thought to be the last-but-one over of the innings, Hick, on 98, blocked three successive balls, and Atherton lost patience and ungenerously declared; he had batted far more slowly himself".

The next two years followed a similar pattern. Although a draw in a Test series against the West Indies in 1995 and victory in Test series at home against India and away against New Zealand suggested that England were improving, the team continued to struggle against the talent of Australia and Pakistan. Although Atherton led England to victory in the first test of the 1997 Ashes at Birmingham, England's only victory in an Ashes Test that was not a dead rubber between 1986 and 2005, England lost the series 3-2. England also crashed out of the 1996 Cricket World Cup after defeat to eventual champions Sri Lanka, controversy also ensuing during this tournament after a defeat when Atherton's irritated observation about a local journalist was picked up on tape. The lack of consistent progress and the effect of a back ailment contributed to Atherton's decision to resign after five years as captain after a defeat in the West Indies in 1997-8.

Atherton continued to play Test cricket for a further four years before retiring at the end of the 2001 Ashes. However, plagued by his chronic back condition, he did not manage to attain his previous levels of performance. Highlights of his later career however included man of the match-winning Test centuries at the Oval and Karachi in 2000, in Tests which ensured England rare Test series victories respectively against the West Indies (their first for 31 years), and Pakistan (their first for 18 years).

Atherton's finest performances came when he had his back against the wall. Notable examples include his monumental 185 not out in 643 minutes to salvage a draw against South Africa, and his negation of an outstanding Allan Donald onslaught in 1998. This doggedness prompted Steve Waugh to dub him "The Cockroach", but his record against Australia was modest. He averaged under thirty, with only one century in 33 tests. and he was dismissed 19 times by Glenn McGrath, the Australian opening bowler, a record for any bowler against one batsman.

Alongside McGrath, two other world-class bowlers frequently tormented Atherton, with Courtney Walsh dismissing him seventeen times and Shane Warne ten times. As well as being seen as struggling against the very best, Atherton had the dubious honour of having the lowest batting average of any player to have scored 6,000 or more runs in Test cricket at the time of his retirement. He was also dismissed for nought on twenty occasions at Test level, which was an English record at the time of his retirement.

=== International centuries ===
During his career Atherton made eighteen centuries in international cricket, sixteen of which were scored in Test matches while the other two came in One Day Internationals. In Tests, thirteen of his centuries came in the first innings and three in the second innings.

Test centuries
No.	Score	Against	Pos.	Inn.	Test	Venue	H/A/N	Date	Result	Ref
1	151	New Zealand	2	2	1/3	Trent Bridge, Nottingham	Home	7 June 1990	Draw	
2	131	India	2	1	2/3	Old Trafford Cricket Ground, Manchester	Home	9 August 1990	Draw	
3	105	Australia	2	2	3/5	Sydney Cricket Ground, Sydney	Away	4 January 1991	Draw	
4	144	West Indies	2	1	2/5	Bourda, Georgetown	Away	17 March 1994	Loss	
5	135	West Indies	1	2	5/5	Antigua Recreation Ground, St. Johns	Away	16 April 1994	Draw	
6	101	New Zealand	1	2	1/3	Trent Bridge, Nottingham	Home	2 June 1994	Win	
7	111	New Zealand	1	1	3/3	Old Trafford Cricket Ground, Manchester	Home	30 June 1994	Draw	
8	113	West Indies	2	1	5/6	Trent Bridge, Nottingham	Home	10 April 1995	Draw	
9	185 not out	South Africa	1	4	2/5	Wanderers Stadium, Johannesburg	Away	30 November 1995	Draw	
10	160	India	1	2	3/3	Trent Bridge, Nottingham	Home	4 July 1996	Draw	
11	118	New Zealand	2	4	3/3	Lancaster Park, Christchurch	Away	14 February 1997	Win	
12	103	South Africa	2	1	1/5	Edgbaston Cricket Ground, Birmingham	Home	4 June 1998	Draw	
13	108	South Africa	2	2	2/5	St George's Park, Port Elizabeth	Away	9 December 1999	Draw	
14	136	Zimbabwe	1	1	2/2	Trent Bridge, Nottingham	Home	1 June 2000	Draw	
15	108	West Indies	1	3	5/5	The Oval, London	Home	31 August 2000	Win	
16	125	Pakistan	1	2	3/3	National Stadium, Karachi, Karachi	Away	7 December 2000	Win	

ODI centuries
No.	Score	Against	Pos.	Inn.	ODI	Venue	H/A/N	Date	Result	Ref
1	127	West Indies	1	1	3/3	Lord's, London	Home	28 May 1995	Win	
2	113 not out	Australia	1	2	2/3	The Oval, London	Home	24 May 1997	Win	

== Post-playing career ==
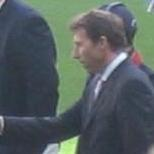
Atherton conducting interviews for Sky Sports during the 2006–07 Ashes series

Since his retirement from the game, Atherton has carved out a successful career in the media. He was a journalist for The Sunday Telegraph and succeeded Christopher Martin-Jenkins as The Times cricket correspondent on 1 May 2008.

Between 2002 and 2005, he was a member of the Channel 4 commentary team for the coverage of Test cricket in England. During this period he also worked as a commentator for BBC Radio and Talksport on Test matches outside England. Atherton joined the Sky Sports commentary team in 2005, after they won the rights to live Test cricket in England, joining long-time England teammate Nasser Hussain, their former England coach David "Bumble" Lloyd and former England captain David Gower. He commentates on all forms of the game, home and abroad, as well as covering some domestic matches. He often performs as the post-match master of ceremonies for internationals in England, presenting awards and interviewing players.

In 2002 he produced his autobiography: Opening Up. He has also written Gambling: A Story of Triumph and Disaster, published in 2006.

In March 2010, he won Sports Journalist of the Year, at the British Press Awards. The judges announced this was "a unanimous choice", praised the former England cricket captain for "tackling subjects way beyond cricket" and said "the brilliance of his writing shines." He was named the Sports Writer of the Year by the Sports Journalists' Association in 2009 and 2011.

He was one of the commentators in 2011 Cricket World Cup. He has gained fame for his no nonsense but dryly humorous views on cricket.

== Personal life ==
Atherton is married to Isabelle De Caires (granddaughter of West Indies test cricketer Frank De Caires), hailing from Guyana. Atherton's elder son, Josh de Caires, signed a professional contract with Middlesex in 2020, and made his first-class debut for Middlesex in July 2021.

== Health ==
Atherton has no sense of smell, something his family first noticed when he was 6 or 7. He has no memory of ever having this sense, but did not think about this until the COVID-19 pandemic, when there was much discussion of sufferers losing their sense of smell, and he wondered what he was missing. He thinks this may affect his taste, but takes the view that if one is going to lose one sense, smell is the one to lose.

Atherton suffers from the degenerative condition ankylosing spondylitis, which meant he could not duck under bouncers, but had to stand tall and sway out of the way. First diagnosed at age 22, the hereditary condition also ended the footballing career of his father Alan. Atherton kept the condition hidden from the media and opposition until 1998, and caused him severe pain for the majority of his playing career. Allan Donald used this against him by bowling short.

In 1992, Atherton had an operation in Nottingham to fuse together his fourth and fifth vertebrae after he suffered a slipped disc.

Sporting positions
Preceded by Graham Gooch	English national cricket captain 1993–1998	Succeeded by Alec Stewart
