= Stabroek News =

Daily newspaper in Guyana

- Type: Daily newspaper
- Format: Tabloid
- Founder: David de Caires
- Editor-in-chief: Anand Persaud
- Founded: 1986
- Ceased publication: 2026
- Headquarters: 46-47 Robb Street, Lacytown, Georgetown, Guyana
- Website: stabroeknews.com

The Stabroek News was a privately owned newspaper published in Guyana. It took its name from Stabroek /ˈstæbruːk/, the former name of Georgetown, Guyana.

== History ==
The Sabroek News was first published in November 1986, first as a weekly but it later changed to a daily print newspaper. The entry of the paper into the mass media in Guyana brought a new openness to the media environment in the country.

The paper was founded by David DeCaires, who died on November 1, 2008. On February 13, 2026, the paper announced it will cease. Isabelle and Brendan de Caires, the two main business shareholders, said mounting financial pressures and outstanding government debt led to the closure. Its last issues were released on March 15, 2026.
