= Ben Dawkins (cricketer) =

English cricketer

Personal information
- Full name: Benjamin Joshua Dawkins
- Born: 19 October 2006 (age 20); Johannesburg, South Africa
- Batting: Right-handed
- Role: Wicket-keeper

Domestic team information
- Years: Team
- 2025–2026: Kent (squad no. 15)
- FC debut: 29 July 2025 Kent v Leicestershire

Career statistics
Competition	First-class	List A
Matches	10	14
Runs scored	559	338
Batting average	34.93	26.00
100s/50s	1/5	1/1
Top score	180	111*
Balls bowled	12	–
Wickets	0	–
Bowling average	–	–
5 wickets in innings	–	–
10 wickets in match	–	–
Best bowling	–	–
Catches/stumpings	6/–	3/–
Medal record
Men's cricket
Representing England
ICC U19 World Cup
Runner-up	2026 Zimbabwe & Namibia
- Source: CricInfo, 14 August 2026

Benjamin Joshua Dawkins (born 19 October 2006) is an English cricketer who plays for Kent County Cricket Club. He is a right-handed batsman who plays as a wicket-keeper. He has played for the England national under-19 cricket team.

Born in South Africa in 2006, Dawkins was educated at Sevenoaks School and played age-group cricket for Kent. A wicket-keeper, he made his Kent Second XI debut in 2023. He scored 48 runs against Zimbabwe A in a 50-over match in July 2024, and 108 not out from 52 deliveries against Essex Second XI in May 2025. In 2024 and 2025 he played for the England under-19 side, scoring 93 against Sri Lanka under-19s in a one-day match in 2024 June, and half-centuries in three Youth One-Day International matches against India under-19s in July 2025.

Dawkins signed his first professional cricket contract with Kent in July 2025 and made his first-class cricket debut on 29 July 2025 against Leicestershire. Later in the season he made scores of 85 and 111 not out in the 2025 One-Day Cup.

In December 2025, he was named in the England squad for the 2026 Under-19 Men's Cricket World Cup.

In May 2026, Dawkins made a career-best score with a 65 in the County Championship against Gloucestershire before hitting his maiden first-class century with 180 against Durham, and was involved in a record stand with Sam Northeast, their 303-run partnership with for the second wicket Kent’s highest stand for any wicket against Durham.
