= Ben Geddes =

English cricketer

Personal information
- Full name: Benedict Brodie Albert Geddes
- Born: 31 July 2001 (age 25); Epsom, Surrey, England
- Batting: Right-handed
- Role: Batsman

Domestic team information
- Years: Team
- 2021–2024: Surrey (squad no. 14)
- 2023: → Kent (on loan)
- 2025–present: Middlesex (squad no. 14)
- FC debut: 4 July 2021 Surrey v Hampshire
- LA debut: 22 July 2021 Surrey v Yorkshire

Career statistics
Competition	FC	LA	T20
Matches	38	46	29
Runs scored	1,900	1,443	439
Batting average	32.20	33.55	18.29
100s/50s	3/13	2/10	0/2
Top score	137	141*	69
Balls bowled	24	70	–
Wickets	1	1	–
Bowling average	17.00	58.00	–
5 wickets in innings	0	0	–
10 wickets in match	0	0	–
Best bowling	1/5	1/30	–
Catches/stumpings	26/–	20/–	8/–
- Source: Cricinfo, 27 September 2026

Benedict Brodie Albert Geddes (born 31 July 2001) is an English cricketer who plays for Middlesex.

== Early life ==
Formerly a pupil at St John's School, Leatherhead, he joined Surrey’s youth cricket teams at the under-9 age group. He played grade cricket in New South Wales across the 2019-20 Australian summer and played at and was made made first-team captain at Ashtead Cricket Club in the Surrey Championship.

== Career ==
Geddes made his Twenty20 debut on 21 June 2021, for Surrey in the 2021 T20 Blast. He had previously been awarded a two-year deal with the team. On 6 July 2021, he made his first-class debut, for Surrey in the 2021 County Championship, as a replacement player for Will Jacks. He made his List A debut on 22 July 2021, for Surrey in the 2021 Royal London One-Day Cup. In July 2023, Geddes joined Kent on a short-term loan.

In October 2024 it was announced Geddes had left Surrey. Later that month, Geddes signed a three year contract with Middlesex County Cricket Club. In July 2025, he was appointed as Middlesex's one-day captain. On 19 August 2025, he scored an unbeaten 141 against Kent in the 2025 One-Day Cup, his maiden List A century.

In May 2026, Geddes was called up to the England Lions squad to face South Africa A.
