= Samuel Caires =

Brazilian politician (born 2003)

Member of the Legislative Assembly of Minas Gerais
- Incumbent
- Assumed office 1 February 2027

Personal details
- Born: 25 November 2003 (age 22)
- Party: Liberal Party

Claudio Samuel Sousa Caires (born 25 November 2003) is a Brazilian politician who was elected member of the Legislative Assembly of Minas Gerais in 2026. He has been a municipal councillor of Janaúba since 2025.
