= Jaydn Denly =

English cricketer (born 2006)

Personal information
- Full name: Jaydn Kennick Denly
- Born: 5 January 2006 (age 20); Margate, Kent, England
- Batting: Left-handed
- Bowling: Slow left-arm orthodox
- Role: All-rounder
- Relatives: Joe Denly (uncle)

Domestic team information
- Years: Team
- 2023–: Kent (squad no. 42)
- LA debut: 11 August 2023 Kent v Surrey
- FC debut: 12 April 2024 Kent v Essex

Career statistics
Competition	First-class	List A	T20
Matches	11	28	1
Runs scored	398	669	9
Batting average	24.87	26.76	--
100s/50s	0/2	0/5	--/--
Top score	74	91	9
Balls bowled	591	606	18
Wickets	7	22	1
Bowling average	71.85	26.90	21
5 wickets in innings	0	0	0
10 wickets in match	0	0	0
Best bowling	2/25	3/15	1/21
Catches/stumpings	5/–	13/–	--/–
- Source: CricInfo, 14 August 2026

Jaydn Kennick Denly (born 5 January 2006) is an English cricketer who plays for Kent County Cricket Club. He is a left-handed batsman and left-arm off-break bowler. He made his List A cricket debut for Kent on 11 August 2023, against Surrey. He is the nephew of Joe Denly.

== Early life ==
Denly attended school at The Canterbury Academy in Kent. He began playing for the Kent Second XI in 2022, at 16 years-of-age. He scored his first hundred for the second Team in 2024 against Essex.

== Career ==
Denly joined the Kent first team squad in August 2023 as a 17-year-old. He made his debut in List-A cricket against Surrey on 11 August 2023, and took a wicket with his third ball, clean bowling Cameron Steel in a wicket maiden.

He played in the same side as his uncle Joe Denly for the first time on 20 August 2023, against Essex, a match in which he took a wicket, a catch, enacted a run out, and scored 37 with the bat. They became the first uncle and nephew to appear in the same Kent side since Fuller Pilch and William Pilch in the nineteenth century.

On 1 November 2023 Denly signed his first professional contract with Kent. He made his first-class debut on 12 April 2024, playing against Essex in the 2024 County Championship.

He signed a two-year contract extension with Kent in October 2024. He signed a three-year contract extension with Kent County Cricket Club in October 2025.

Denly aged 20 made his T20 debut on 12 July 2025 against Middlesex

== International career ==
In 2023, Denly opened the batting for the England national under-19 cricket team in two under-19 test matches against Australia U19 scoring two half-centuries.

He was included in the England national under-19 cricket team squad for the Youth ODi Series in 2025 against India national under-19 cricket team. Subsequently, Denly was also included in the Youth Test Series against India national under-19 cricket team in 2025. He appeared in the first Youth Test.

== Personal life ==
The son of football manager Sam Denly, he is the nephew of current Kent and former England cricketer Joe Denly.
