= Yousef Majid =

English cricketer

Personal information
- Born: 8 September 2003 (age 23); Slough, Berkshire, England
- Height: 6 ft 2 in (188 cm)
- Batting: Left-handed
- Bowling: Slow left-arm orthodox

Domestic team information
- Years: Team
- 2022–present: Surrey (squad no. 68)
- Only First-class: 26 September 2024 Surrey v Essex
- List A debut: 2 August 2022 Surrey v Leicestershire

Career statistics
Competition	FC	LA	T20
Matches	1	31	8
Runs scored	5	63	4
Batting average	5.00	5.25	4.00
100s/50s	0/0	0/0	0/0
Top score	5	14	3*
Balls bowled	180	1,428	138
Wickets	2	27	8
Bowling average	64.00	49.18	27.25
5 wickets in innings	0	0	0
10 wickets in match	0	0	0
Best bowling	2/128	3/57	3/42
Catches/stumpings	0/–	5/–	2/–
- Source: ESPNcricinfo, 11 August 2026

Yousef Majid (born 8 September 2003) is an English cricketer who plays for Surrey County Cricket Club. He is a left handed batsman and slow left arm orthodox bowler.

== Early life ==
Majid attended Cranleigh School and was part of the 2022 Academy intake at Surrey. He made his Second XI debut in 2021. He has also played for Slough CC, Chesham CC, Cranleigh CC.

== Domestic career ==
He was awarded a short term professional contract in the summer of 2022, this came after he took 10 wickets in two Second XI Championship games which included a second innings 6-54 at Radlett against Middlesex. Majid made his List A debut on 2 August 2022 in the 2022 One-Day Cup against Leicestershire at Guildford. He took a wicket with his fifth ball on debut.

== International career ==
On 25 August 2022 Majid was called up to the England under-19 cricket team for the test series against Sri Lanka under-19s. In December 2022 he was selected for the England U-19s to play Australia in January 2023 under head coach Michael Yardy.
