= Alfie Ogborne =

English cricketer (born 2003)

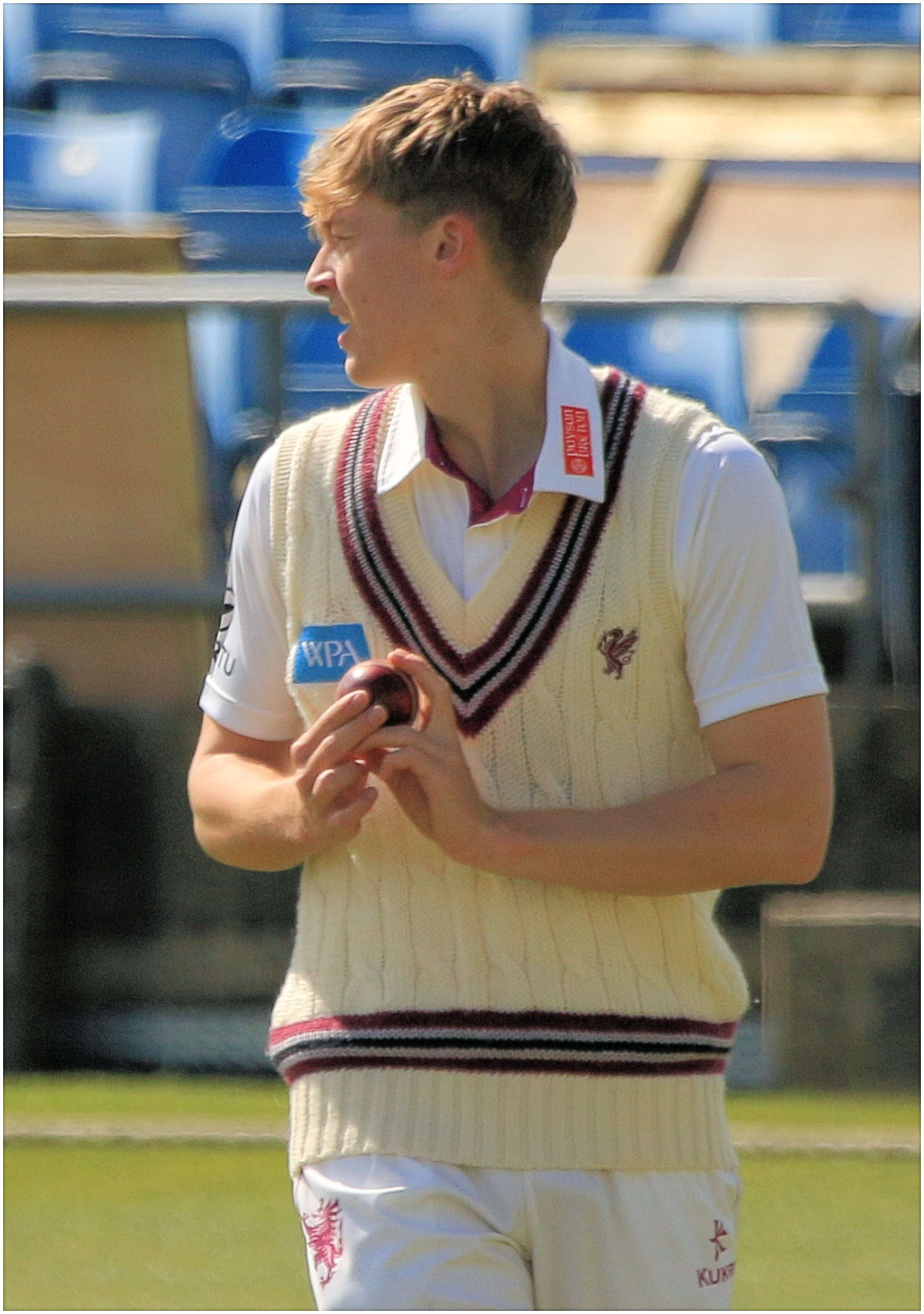
- Ogborne in 2024

Personal information
- Full name: Alfie Richard James Ogborne
- Born: 15 July 2003 (age 23); Yeovil, Somerset, England
- Batting: Right-handed
- Bowling: Left-arm fast-medium
- Role: Bowler

Domestic team information
- Years: Team
- 2022–present: Somerset (squad no. 3)
- 2024: → Kent (on loan)
- FC debut: 10 July 2023 Somerset v Hampshire
- LA debut: 10 August 2022 Somerset v Durham

Career statistics
Competition	FC	LA	T20
Matches	12	17	2
Runs scored	125	89	4
Batting average	8.92	22.25	4.00
100s/50s	0/0	0/0	0/0
Top score	38	30*	0
Balls bowled	1,514	783	36
Wickets	26	22	1
Bowling average	39.14	32.68	63.00
5 wickets in innings	0	1	0
10 wickets in match	0	0	0
Best bowling	3/40	5/41	1/37
Catches/stumpings	6/–	7/–	1/–
- Source: ESPNcricinfo, 28 June 2026

Alfie Richard James Ogborne (born 15 July 2003) is an English cricketer who plays for Somerset.

A childhood Somerset supporter, he made his List A debut on 10 August 2022 and his first-class debut on 10 July 2023.

In August 2024, Ogborne joined Kent on loan for two County Championship matches. In May 2025, he rejoined Kent on loan for two County Championship matches. Alfie attended Ansford Academy in Castle Cary. He started playing cricket at his local club in Sparkford, Somerset.

In May 2026, Ogborne was selected for the England Lions squad.
