= Rishi Patel =

English cricketer (born 1998)

Personal information
- Full name: Rishi Ketan Patel
- Born: 26 July 1998 (age 28); Chigwell, Essex, England
- Batting: Right-handed
- Bowling: Right-arm leg break

Domestic team information
- Years: Team
- 2019–2020: Essex (squad no. 12)
- 2021–2026: Leicestershire (squad no. 26)
- 2024: Birmingham Phoenix
- First-class debut: 26 March 2019 Essex v Cambridge MCCU
- List A debut: 28 April 2019 Essex v Hampshire

Career statistics
Competition	FC	LA	T20
Matches	73	46	83
Runs scored	3,930	1,246	1,656
Batting average	34.17	27.68	21.23
100s/50s	8/18	4/4	2/3
Top score	179	161	104
Balls bowled	597	122	12
Wickets	4	6	1
Bowling average	98.25	22.16	19.00
5 wickets in innings	0	1	0
10 wickets in match	0	0	0
Best bowling	1/4	5/65	1/7
Catches/stumpings	55/–	24/–	28/–
- Source: Cricinfo, 26 September 2026

Rishi Ketan Patel (born 26 July 1998) is an English cricketer. He has played for Essex's Second XI side, and signed a professional contract with Essex in 2018. He made his first-class debut on 26 March 2019, for Cambridge MCCU against Essex, as part of the Marylebone Cricket Club University fixtures. He made his List A debut on 28 April 2019, for Essex in the 2019 Royal London One-Day Cup. In October 2020, he was signed by Leicestershire County Cricket Club on a three-year deal. Patel made his Twenty20 debut on 10 June 2021, for Leicestershire in the 2021 T20 Blast.

On 9 April 2023, he scored his maiden century in first-class cricket, leading Leicestershire to defeat Yorkshire at Headingly for the first time since 1910.

Patel signed a new two-year contract with Leicestershire in February 2025. On 3 July 2026, it was announced he would leave Leicestershire at the end of that year's county season. Three days later Patel joined Hampshire for the start of the 2027 county season.
