= Josh de Caires =

English cricketer (born 2002)

Personal information
- Full name: Joshua Michael de Caires
- Born: 25 April 2002 (age 24); Paddington, London, England
- Batting: Right-handed
- Bowling: Right-arm off break
- Role: Batsman
- Relatives: Michael Atherton (father); David de Caires (grandfather); Frank de Caires (great-grandfather)

Domestic team information
- Years: Team
- 2021–present: Middlesex (squad no. 25)
- FC debut: 5 July 2021 Middlesex v Gloucestershire
- LA debut: 3 August 2021 Middlesex v Lancashire

Career statistics
Competition	FC	LA	T20
Matches	31	35	31
Runs scored	1,190	834	339
Batting average	25.86	26.90	14.73
100s/50s	0/8	1/4	0/1
Top score	87	130	80*
Balls bowled	2,870	784	260
Wickets	38	20	14
Bowling average	43.07	34.80	30.07
5 wickets in innings	2	1	0
10 wickets in match	1	0	0
Best bowling	8/106	6/35	2/34
Catches/stumpings	14/–	23/–	12/–
- Source: Cricinfo, 27 September 2026

Joshua Michael de Caires (born 25 April 2002) is an English cricketer, and the son of former England cricket captain Michael Atherton. He made his first-class debut on 5 July 2021, for Middlesex in the 2021 County Championship.

== Personal life ==
De Caires is from Paddington, Middlesex, England. He is the son of former England cricketer Michael Atherton, and the great-grandson of former West Indian cricketer Frank de Caires. De Caires says that he has rarely seen his father batting, as he was born eight months after Atherton's last Test match. He was given his mother's maiden name, but does not know why. De Caires attended St Albans School, Hertfordshire, where he was coached by former England cricketer Mark Ilott, and as of 2021, he was a student of economics at the University of Leeds.

== Career ==
De Caires is a batsman, who often opens the batting. He started playing for Middlesex CCC under-14s in 2015. On debut, he scored 90*. In 2017, De Caires made his debut for Middlesex Second XI, at the age of 15. In 2019, he hit a century in a Second XI Championship match against Hampshire.

In 2020, De Caires played for Middlesex in a two-day pre-season friendly against Northamptonshire CCC. In August 2020, De Caires signed a three-year professional contract with Middlesex. In club cricket, De Caires played for Radlett Cricket Club in the 2020 Hertfordshire Cricket League season. He was the league's second-highest wicket taker. In 2021, De Caires played for Leeds/Bradford MCCU in a match against Yorkshire CCC. He scored 118 from 292 deliveries to help Leeds/Bradford secure a draw in the match. The match did not have first-class status, as university matches no longer qualify for first-class status. The Yorkshire bowling attack included England bowler David Willey. He also played for Tickhill Cricket Club in 2021.

De Caires made his first-class debut on 5 July 2021, for Middlesex in the 2021 County Championship. On 9 July 2021, he made his Twenty20 debut, also for Middlesex, in the 2021 T20 Blast. He made his List A debut on 3 August 2021, for Middlesex in the 2021 Royal London One-Day Cup.

In 2022, De Caires scored a half-century for Leeds/Bradford MCCU in a match against Yorkshire. In Middlesex's first match of the 2022 County Championship, he scored his maiden first-class half-century.

In the 2023 County Championship match against Hampshire, De Caires took career best figures of 7–144. Later in the season, he took 8–106 in a match against Essex.

De Caires signed a new two-year contract with Middlesex in November 2025, tying him into the club until at least the end of the 2027 season.
