= Ekansh Singh =

English cricketer (born 2006)

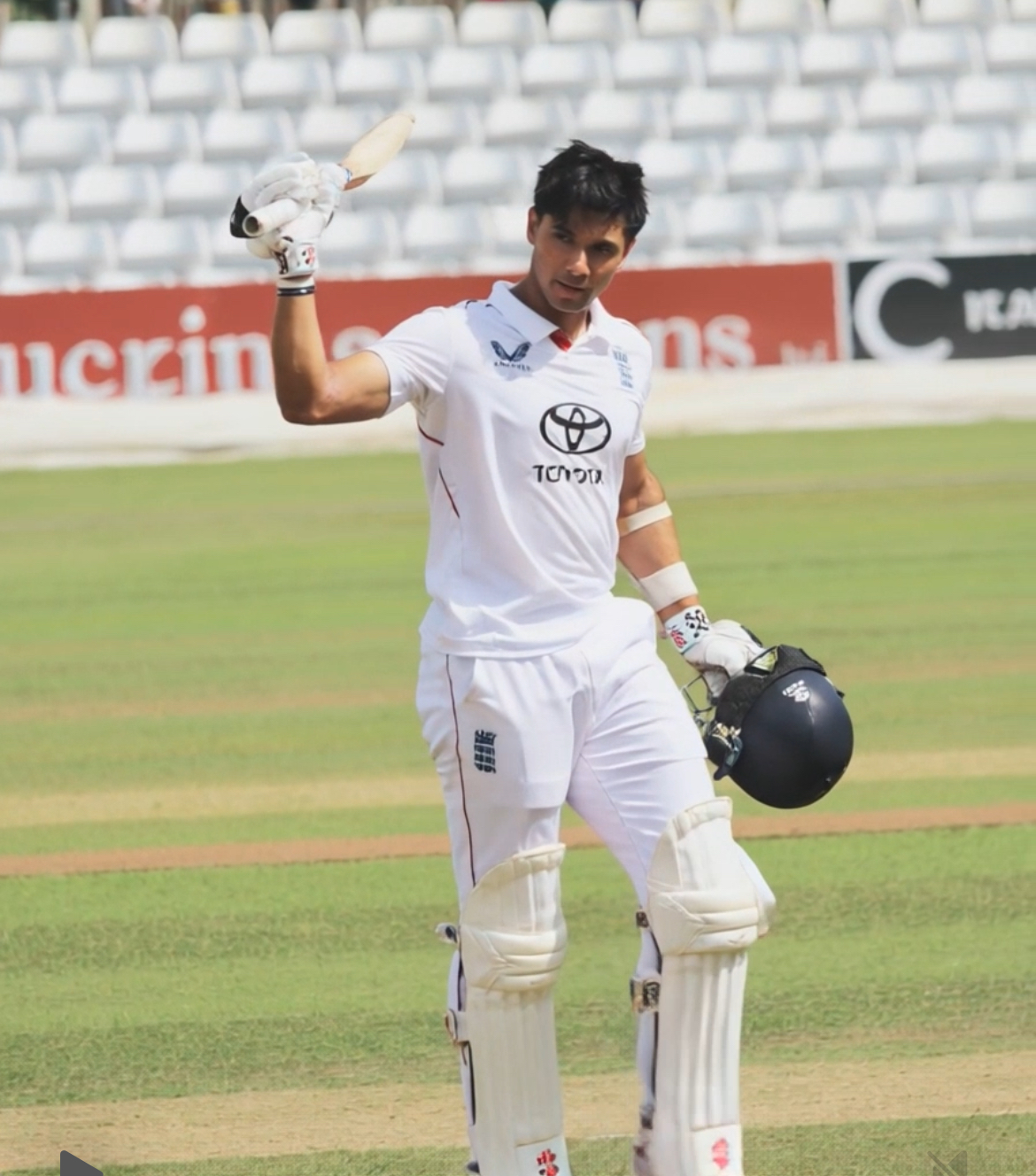
- Ekansh Singh Youth Test 2025

Personal information
- Born: 16 July 2006 (age 20); Orpington, London Borough of Bromley
- Batting: Right-handed
- Bowling: Right-arm Fast medium
- Role: Batting all-rounder

Domestic team information
- Years: Team
- 2024–: Kent (squad no. 5)
- FC debut: 9 May 2025 Kent v Glamorgan
- LA debut: 26 July 2024 Kent v Somerset

Career statistics
Competition	FC	LA	T20
Matches	17	22	3
Runs scored	773	525	11
Batting average	28.62	27.63	5.50
100s/50s	0/5	0/1	0/0
Top score	95	71	6
Balls bowled	1,172	462	29
Wickets	19	16	1
Bowling average	47.73	28.12	43.00
5 wickets in innings	0	0	0
10 wickets in match	0	0	0
Best bowling	3/46	4/40	1/21
Catches/stumpings	4/–	8/–	0/–
- Source: CricInfo, 4 November 2026

Ekansh Singh (born 16 July 2006) is an English cricketer who plays for Kent County Cricket Club and represented England national under-19 cricket team and England Lions. He is a right-handed batsman and right-arm bowler who plays as a batting all-rounder. He made his List A debut for Kent against Somerset in July 2024 at Taunton in the 2024 One-Day Cup, and his first-class debut in May 2025 against Glamorgan at Canterbury in the 2025 County Championship.

Singh has played One Day International and Test cricket for the England under-19 cricket team and England Lions.

== Early life and education ==
Born in Orpington, Singh was educated at The Judd School in Tonbridge. He played age-group cricket for Kent teams, and made his Second XI debut for the county in 2022, scoring his first century for the team, an innings of 107 not out, against Essex Second XI in 2024. He was a member of the county's cricket academy and has played club cricket for Orpington Cricket Club, Dartford Cricket Club and Bexley Cricket Club.

After leaving school, Singh entered Durham University. He has played for Durham University Centre of Cricketing Excellence, scoring 91 runs against Durham County Cricket Club in a 2025 pre-season match.

== Career ==
He played for Kent County Cricket Club through age groups, prior to signing for the Kent County Cricket Academy.

Singh signed his first professional contract in July 2024 and was a member of Kent's squad for the 2024 One-Day Cup competition, going on to play five matches in the competition, scoring 54 runs.

Singh made his first-class debut against Glamorgan at Canterbury in May 2025 after scoring 135 against Essex in Kent Second Eleven game.

One year into his rookie contract, Singh signed his full professional contract with Kent County Cricket Club for three years in Oct 2025.

Singh, aged 19 made his T20 debut on 10 July 2026 against Surrey.

== International career ==
Ekansh Singh made his International ODI Debut for England national Under-19 Team in September 2024 in a series played against Ireland under-19s and Scotland under-19s taking place at Loughborough University. He played in two matches in the series, scoring 39 runs against Scotland under-19s and 35 against Ireland under-19s.

He was again recalled to play the fifth match of the youth ODI series against India national under-19 cricket team as a batting allrounder.

He made his Test Debut for England national Under-19 Team in July 2025 against India national under-19 cricket team. In the second test of the series Singh scored a superb 117 sprinkled with three sixes and 14 fours.

Singh made his England Lions debut in a two test series against South Africa A on 22 May 2026. He was later recalled for the last two England Lions ODI matches against South Africa A.

Singh was recalled to the England Lions squad for their November 2026 tour of the West Indies, featuring in both T20 and 50-over fixtures. He subsequently secured a further call-up for the England Lions white-ball tour of South Africa in December 2026.
