= Mitchell Killeen =

English cricketer (born 2004)

Personal information
- Full name: Mitchell Jack Killeen
- Born: 29 September 2004 (age 22); Durham, County Durham, England
- Batting: Right-handed
- Bowling: Right-arm medium
- Relatives: Neil Killeen (father)

Domestic team information
- Years: Team
- 2022–2025: Durham (squad no. 11)
- 2026–: Essex (squad no. 7)
- 2026: → Gloucestershire (loan) (squad no. 11)
- FC debut: 12 March 2025 Durham v Zimbabwe A
- LA debut: 14 August 2022 Durham v Notts

Career statistics
Competition	FC	LA
Matches	7	16
Runs scored	93	103
Batting average	8.45	17.16
100s/50s	0/0	0/0
Top score	21	32
Balls bowled	569	652
Wickets	15	15
Bowling average	19.66	36.33
5 wickets in innings	1	0
10 wickets in match	0	0
Best bowling	5/36	3/15
Catches/stumpings	2/–	6/–
- Source: Cricinfo, 27 September 2026

Mitchell Jack Killeen (born 29 September 2004) is an English cricketer who plays for Essex County Cricket Club. He is a right-handed batsman and right arm medium pace bowler.

== Career ==
He came through the Durham County Cricket Academy and signed a rookie contract with the county in 2022, and made his debut that year, earning three appearances in the Royal London Cup. He also made his debut for England U19 in 2022. Having made four List A appearances for the county he signed a one year extension to his rookie contract with Durham in 2023. He signed another contract extension in 2024.

In May 2025, he was called into a County Select XI to play the touring Zimbabwe national team in Leicester. That month, he made his County Championship debut for Durham against Somerset, taking five wickets in the first innings.

In August 2025, after rejecting the offer of a contract extension from Durham, Killeen agreed a two-year deal to join Essex starting in 2026. Killeen is a T20 premiership player for Tallangatta Cricket Club.

== Personal life ==
He is the son of former cricketer Neil Killeen. He also played club cricket in the North East Premier League Premier Division for Ashington cricket club.
