= George Bartlett (cricketer) =

English cricketer (born 1998)

Personal information
- Full name: George Anthony Bartlett
- Born: 14 March 1998 (age 28); Frimley, Surrey, England
- Batting: Right-handed
- Bowling: Right-arm off break
- Role: Batsman

Domestic team information
- Years: Team
- 2017–2023: Somerset (squad no. 14)
- 2024–2026: Northamptonshire (squad no. 14)
- First-class debut: 5 September 2017 Somerset v Warwickshire
- List A debut: 24 April 2019 Somerset v Sussex

Career statistics
Competition	FC	LA	T20
Matches	88	54	25
Runs scored	4,001	1,537	220
Batting average	31.01	34.15	12.22
100s/50s	9/18	1/11	0/1
Top score	137	108	82*
Balls bowled	110	92	–
Wickets	1	2	–
Bowling average	80.00	43.00	–
5 wickets in innings	0	0	–
10 wickets in match	0	0	–
Best bowling	1/13	1/4	–
Catches/stumpings	36/–	23/–	9/–
- Source: ESPNcricinfo, 27 September 2026

George Anthony Bartlett (born 14 March 1998) is an English cricketer who plays for Northamptonshire County Cricket Club. He made his first-class debut for Somerset in the 2017 County Championship against Warwickshire on 5 September 2017. He made his List A debut on 24 April 2019, for Somerset in the 2019 Royal London One-Day Cup. He made his Twenty20 debut on 30 August 2020, for Somerset in the 2020 t20 Blast.

In August 2023, Bartlett confirmed that he would be leaving Somerset at the end of the season and had signed a three-year contract with Northamptonshire ahead of the 2024 season. In May 2026, he agreed a contract extension with Northamptonshire which tied him into the club until at least the end of the 2027 season. Just six months later, in November 2026, Bartlett signed a further extension to his contract with Northamptonshire to run until the end of the 2028 season.
