= Oli Carter =

English cricketer (born 2001)

Personal information
- Full name: Oliver James Carter
- Born: 2 November 2001 (age 25); Eastbourne, East Sussex, England
- Batting: Right-handed
- Role: Wicket-keeper

Domestic team information
- Years: Team
- 2021–present: Sussex (squad no. 11)
- First-class debut: 4 July 2021 Sussex v Glamorgan
- List A debut: 23 July 2021 Sussex v Lancashire

Career statistics
Competition	FC	LA	T20
Matches	43	32	20
Runs scored	2,174	704	235
Batting average	32.44	25.14	13.82
100s/50s	1/15	0/5	0/1
Top score	185	94	64
Catches/stumpings	89/2	21/3	7/1
- Source: Cricinfo, 26 September 2026

Oliver James Carter (born 2 November 2001) is an English cricketer. He made his first-class debut on 4 July 2021, for Sussex in the 2021 County Championship. He made his Twenty20 debut on 9 July 2021, for Sussex in the 2021 T20 Blast. He made his List A debut on 23 July 2021, for Sussex in the 2021 Royal London One-Day Cup. In June 2022, in the 2022 County Championship match against Glamorgan, Carter scored his maiden century in first-class cricket.
