= James Wharton (cricketer) =

English cricketer (born 2001)

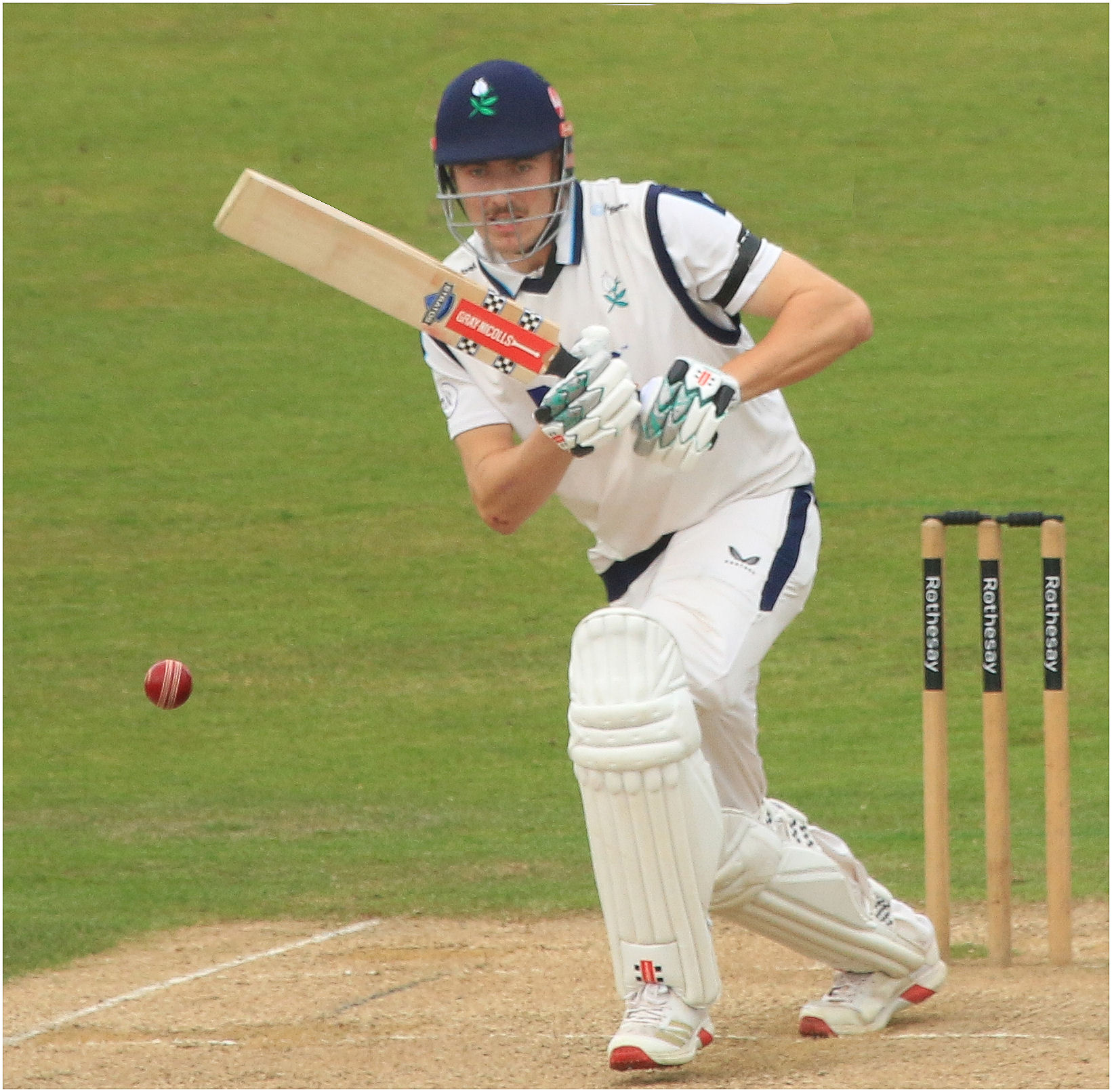
- Wharton in 2025

Personal information
- Full name: James Henry Wharton
- Born: 1 February 2001 (age 25); Huddersfield, West Yorkshire, England
- Batting: Right-handed
- Bowling: Right-arm off break
- Role: Batsman

Domestic team information
- Years: Team
- 2020–present: Yorkshire (squad no. 23)
- First-class debut: 14 April 2022 Yorkshire v Gloucestershire
- List A debut: 1 August 2023 Yorkshire v Kent

Career statistics
Competition	FC	LA	T20
Matches	44	30	35
Runs scored	2,436	1,058	788
Batting average	34.30	44.08	24.62
100s/50s	2/16	1/9	1/5
Top score	285	118	111*
Balls bowled	97	–	–
Wickets	1	–	–
Bowling average	133.00	–	–
5 wickets in innings	0	–	–
10 wickets in match	0	–	–
Best bowling	1/1	–	–
Catches/stumpings	20/–	21/–	14/–
- Source: Cricinfo, 26 September 2026

James Henry Wharton (born 1 February 2001) is an English cricketer. He made his Twenty20 debut on 14 September 2020, for Yorkshire in the 2020 t20 Blast. He made his first-class debut on 14 April 2022, for Yorkshire in the 2022 County Championship. On Friday 9 June 2023 James hit his maiden T20 Hundred for Yorkshire.
