= 2025 County Championship =

Cricket tournament

- Dates: 4 April – 27 September 2025
- Administrator: England and Wales Cricket Board
- Cricket format: First-class cricket (4 days)
- Tournament format: League system
- Champions: Nottinghamshire (7th title)
- Participants: 18
- Matches: 126
- Most runs: Dom Sibley, Surrey (1,274) (Note: Division 1); Saif Zaib, Northamptonshire (1,425) (Note: Division 2)
- Most wickets: Tom Taylor, Worcestershire (58); Luis Reece, Derbyshire (50)

The 2025 County Championship, known for sponsorship reasons as the Rothesay County Championship 2025, was the 125th cricket County Championship season in England and Wales. As in 2024, Division One had ten teams and Division Two had eight teams. The season began on 4 April and ended on 27 September 2025. Surrey were the defending champions. Nottinghamshire won the title for the seventh time in the club's history and the first since 2010.

== Teams ==
The teams were split based on the finishing positions in the 2024 season. The following teams took part in the County Championship:

=== Division One teams ===
Team	Primary home ground	Captain	Coach
Durham	Riverside Ground, Chester-le-Street	Alex Lees	Ryan Campbell
Essex	County Ground, Chelmsford	Tom Westley	Chris Silverwood
Hampshire	Rose Bowl, Southampton	Ben Brown	Adrian Birrell
Nottinghamshire	Trent Bridge, Nottingham	Haseeb Hameed	Peter Moores
Somerset	County Ground, Taunton	Lewis Gregory	Jason Kerr
Surrey	The Oval, London	Rory Burns	Gareth Batty
Sussex	County Ground, Hove	John Simpson	Paul Farbrace
Warwickshire	Edgbaston, Birmingham	Alex Davies	Ian Westwood
Worcestershire	New Road, Worcester	Brett D'Oliveira	Alan Richardson
Yorkshire	Headingley, Leeds	Jonny Bairstow	Anthony McGrath

Team promoted from Division Two in 2024

=== Division Two teams ===
Team	Primary home ground	Captain	Coach
Derbyshire	County Ground, Derby	Wayne Madsen	Mickey Arthur
Glamorgan	Sophia Gardens, Cardiff	Sam Northeast	Richard Dawson
Gloucestershire	County Ground, Bristol	Cameron Bancroft	Mark Alleyne
Kent	St Lawrence Ground, Canterbury	Daniel Bell-Drummond	Adam Hollioake
Lancashire	Old Trafford, Manchester	Keaton Jennings (until 13 May); Marcus Harris (interim until 11 September); James Anderson (stand-in)	Dale Benkenstein (until 28 May); Steven Croft (interim)
Leicestershire	Grace Road, Leicester	Peter Handscomb	Alfonso Thomas
Middlesex	Lord's, London	Toby Roland-Jones (until 9 July); Leus du Plooy	Richard Johnson (until 17 June); Dane Vilas (interim)
Northamptonshire	County Ground, Northampton	Luke Procter	Darren Lehmann

Team relegated from Division One in 2024

== Division One ==
=== April ===
4–7 April 2025
Scorecard

Essex	v	Surrey
582/6d (147.2 overs); Matt Critchley 145* (261); Dan Lawrence 3/169 (35.2 overs)		365 (129.5 overs); Ben Foakes 92* (191); Simon Harmer 4/83 (47 overs)
		219/6 (97 overs) (f/o); Dom Sibley 66 (221); Shane Snater 1/23 (7 overs)

Match drawn
County Ground, Chelmsford
Umpires: Ian Blackwell and Russell Warren

- Essex won the toss and elected to bat.
- Charlie Allison (Essex) made his first-class debut.
- Points: Essex 14, Surrey 11

4–7 April 2025
Scorecard

Yorkshire	v	Hampshire
121 (34.4 overs); Dawid Malan 31 (33); Liam Dawson 3/8 (4.4 overs)		249 (89.2 overs); Ben Brown 49* (63); George Hill 3/36 (18.2 overs)
275 (99.5overs); Adam Lyth 106 (275); Brad Wheal 4/56 (19 overs)		148/5 (39.3 overs); Tom Prest 57 (69); Dom Bess 3/52 (13.3 overs)

Hampshire won by 5 wickets
Rose Bowl, Southampton
Umpires: James Middlebrook and Rob White

- Yorkshire won the toss and elected to bat.
- Points: Hampshire 19, Yorkshire 3

4–7 April 2025
Scorecard

Durham	v	Nottinghamshire
378 (99.5 overs); Colin Ackermann 116 (203); Fergus O'Neill 5/81 (22.5 overs)		579 (155.5 overs); Lyndon James 125 (160); Matthew Potts 4/112 (35 overs)
289 (85.3 overs); Colin Ackermann 124 (223); Josh Tongue 5/66 (21 overs)		89/2 (17.1 overs); Haseeb Hameed 39* (57); Matthew Potts 1/10 (6 overs)

Nottinghamshire won by 8 wickets
Trent Bridge, Nottingham
Umpires: Nigel Llong and Graham Lloyd

- Nottinghamshire won the toss and elected to field.
- Points: Nottinghamshire 22, Durham 5

4–7 April 2025
Scorecard

Worcestershire	v	Somerset
154 (45.3 overs); Gareth Roderick 58 (98); Kasey Aldridge 5/36 (8 overs)		670/7d (149.4 overs); Tom Banton 371 (403); Adam Finch 2/104 (21 overs)
485/9 (200 overs); Brett D'Oliveira 121 (340); Jack Leach 4/107 (65 overs)

Match drawn
County Ground, Taunton
Umpires: Paul Pollard and Martin Saggers

- Somerset won the toss and elected to field.
- Tom Banton (Somerset) made his maiden triple century in first-class cricket and the highest individual first-class score for Somerset.
- Points: Somerset 16, Worcestershire 9

4–7 April 2025
Scorecard

Sussex	v	Warwickshire
528 (136.3 overs); John Simpson 181* (262); Ethan Bamber 4/105 (30 overs)		454 (113.2 overs); Rob Yates 115 (159); Jack Carson 4/92 (31.2 overs)
313/7d (85 overs); Tom Alsop 82* (131); Rob Yates 3/79 (25 overs)		104/2 (28 overs); Rob Yates 65* (82); Jayden Seales 1/10 (8 overs)

Match drawn
Edgbaston, Birmingham
Umpires: Richard Illingworth and Jack Shantry

- Warwickshire won the toss and elected to field.
- Tazeem Ali and Kai Smith (Warwickshire) both made their first-class debuts.
- Points: Warwickshire 15, Sussex 14

11–14 April 2025
Scorecard

Durham	v	Warwickshire
387 (107.5 overs); Ben McKinney 153 (244); Tazeem Ali 4/66 (20.5 overs)		325 (92.1 overs); Kai Smith 79 (127); Daniel Hogg 3/60 (15 overs)
276/8d (77 overs); Ben Raine 81 (141); Michael Booth 4/66 (18 overs)		344/9 (92.3 overs); Ed Barnard 101 (134); Ben Raine 4/89 (29.3 overs)

Warwickshire won by 1 wicket
Riverside Ground, Chester-le-Street
Umpires: Paul Pollard and Russell Warren

- Durham won the toss and elected to bat.
- Points: Warwickshire 21, Durham 6

11–14 April 2025
Scorecard

Nottinghamshire	v	Essex
347 (104 overs); Kyle Verreynne 128* (242); Sam Cook 4/44 (25 overs)		367 (105.4 overs); Jordan Cox 82 (133); Brett Hutton 3/61 (18.4 overs)
385 (115.1 overs); Jack Haynes 142 (214); Jamie Porter 2/46 (17 overs)		106/1 (31 overs); Paul Walter 41* (93); Brett Hutton 1/24 (5.4 overs)

Match drawn
Trent Bridge, Nottingham
Umpires: Peter Hartley and Wayne Noon

- Essex won the toss and elected to field.
- Points: Essex 14, Nottinghamshire 13

11–14 April 2025
Scorecard

Surrey	v	Hampshire
253 (77.3 overs); Dom Sibley 100* (217); Brad Wheal 4/65 (19.3 overs)		219 (69.2 overs); Tom Prest 44 (81); Daniel Worrall 3/37 (17 overs)
342/9d (93 overs); Dom Sibley 105 (223); Sonny Baker 5/80 (14 overs)		300/5 (102.2 overs); Nick Gubbins 117 (247); Jordan Clark 2/39 (20.2 overs)

Match drawn
The Oval, London
Umpires: Graham Lloyd and Martin Saggers

- Hampshire won the toss and elected to field.
- Sonny Baker (Hampshire) took his first five-wicket haul in first-class cricket.
- Points: Surrey 12, Hampshire 11

11–14 April 2025
Scorecard

Sussex	v	Somerset
294 (74.4 overs); Tom Clark 49 (85); Lewis Gregory 4/90 (20.4 overs)		201 (46 overs); James Rew 80* (83); Sean Hunt 5/48 (12 overs)
501/7d (131 overs); Tom Haines 141 (264); Jack Leach 4/167 (45 overs)		334 (99.3 overs); Tom Abell 96 (172); Sean Hunt 4/28 (10 overs)

Sussex won by 260 runs
County Ground, Hove
Umpires: James Middlebrook and Rob White

- Sussex won the toss and elected to bat.
- Sean Hunt (Sussex) took his first five-wicket haul in first-class cricket.
- Points: Sussex 20, Somerset 3

11–14 April 2025
Scorecard

Yorkshire	v	Worcestershire
456 (101.2 overs); Dawid Malan 98 (133); Ben Allison 3/58 (18.2 overs)		162 (66.3 overs); Jake Libby 53 (106); Ben Coad 4/39 (15.3 overs)
315/4d (56 overs); Dom Bess 107 (117); Ben Allison 2/28 (9 overs)		105 (37.1 overs); Gareth Roderick 27 (55); George Hill 4/23 (7.1 overs)

Yorkshire won by 504 runs
Headingley, Leeds
Umpires: Mark Newell and Steve O'Shaughnessy

- Worcestershire won the toss and elected to field.
- Points: Yorkshire 24, Worcestershire 3

18–21 April 2025
Scorecard

Yorkshire	v	Durham
307 (81 overs); James Wharton 69 (109); Ben Raine 4/64 (24 overs)		427 (106.2 overs); Alex Lees 172 (240); Jack White 3/76 (21.2 overs)
277/6 (105.3 overs); Jonny Bairstow 86* (167); Colin Ackermann 2/49 (24 overs)

Match drawn
Riverside Ground, Chester-le-Street
Umpires: Martin Saggers and Surendiran Shanmugam

- Durham won the toss and elected to field.
- Points: Yorkshire 13, Durham 15

18–21 April 2025
Scorecard

Essex	v	Worcestershire
179 (58.4 overs); Jordan Cox 32 (44); Jacob Duffy 4/39 (16 0vers)		202 (54 overs); Adam Hose 48 (78); Kasun Rajitha 4/52 (13 overs)
317 (95 overs); Paul Walter 104 (154); Matthew Waite 3/40 (18 overs)		266 (84.4 overs); Ethan Brookes 88 (105); Jamie Porter 6/52 (24.4 overs)

Essex won by 28 runs
County Ground, Chelmsford
Umpires: Steve O'Shaughnessy and Rob White

- Worcestershire won the toss and elected to field.
- Points: Essex 19, Worcestershire 3

18–21 April 2025
Scorecard

Somerset	v	Hampshire
184 (54 overs); Migael Pretorius 47* (40); James Fuller 4/42 (11 overs)		336 (93 overs); Nick Gubbins 82 (178); Migael Pretorius 5/64 (19 overs)
163/2 (61.3 overs); Sean Dickson 77* (197); James Fuller 1/27 (9 overs)

Match drawn
Rose Bowl, Southampton
Umpires: Mike Burns and David Millns

- Hampshire won the toss and elected to field.
- Points: Somerset 10, Hampshire 13

18–21 April 2025
Scorecard

Sussex	v	Surrey
435 (132.2 overs); Tom Haines 174 (286); Gus Atkinson 4/120 (32 overs)		490 (109.1 overs); Dan Lawrence 117 (111); James Coles 5/108 (21.1 overs)
132/0 (36 overs); Tom Haines 69* (104)

Match drawn
County Ground, Hove
Umpires: Ben Debenham and Paul Pollard

- Sussex won the toss and elected to bat.
- James Coles (Sussex) took his first five-wicket haul in first-class cricket.
- Points: Sussex 14, Surrey 15

18–21 April 2025
Scorecard

Warwickshire	v	Nottinghamshire
93 (36.4 overs); Sam Hain 43 (81); Fergus O'Neill 5/19 (14 overs)		367 (94.4 overs); Haseeb Hameed 138* (240); Michael Booth 5/90 (25 overs)
181/6 (80.4 overs); Ed Barnard 40* (149); Fergus O'Neill 2/34 (18 overs)

Match drawn
Edgbaston, Birmingham
Umpires: Tom Lungley and James Middlebrook

- Nottinghamshire won the toss and elected to field.
- Michael Booth (Warwickshire) took his first five-wicket haul in first-class cricket.
- Points: Warwickshire 11, Nottinghamshire 14

25–28 April 2025
Scorecard

Sussex	v	Nottinghamshire
169 (59 overs); Oli Carter 46 (106); Josh Tongue 5/44 (13 overs)		300 (68.3 overs); Haseeb Hameed 85 (122); Jayden Seales 4/107 (20 overs)
278 (94.2 overs); John Simpson 74 (149); Farhan Ahmed 4/54 (23.2 overs)		148/1 (25.5 overs); Haseeb Hameed 62* (91); Jayden Seales 1/37 (4 overs)

Nottinghamshire won by 9 wickets
Trent Bridge, Nottingham
Umpires: Ian Blackwell and Mark Newell

- Nottinghamshire won the toss and elected to field.
- Points: Nottinghamshire 21, Sussex 3

25–28 April 2025
Scorecard

Somerset	v	Surrey
283 (95.1 overs); Tom Lammonby 76 (173); Jordan Clark 5/68 (24.1 overs)		367 (108.1 overs); Rory Burns 76 (112); Lewis Gregory 3/46 (19 overs)
119 (35.5 overs); Migael Pretorius 54 (45); Daniel Worrall 3/16 (9 overs)		36/2 (5.2 overs); Rory Burns 20* (20); Kasey Aldridge 1/11 (2.2 overs)

Surrey won by 8 wickets
The Oval, London
Umpires: Rob Bailey and Russell Warren

- Surrey won the toss and elected to field.
- Points: Surrey 22, Somerset 4

25–28 April 2025
Scorecard

Worcestershire	v	Durham
162 (68.2 overs); Henry Nicholls 42 (115); Jake Ball 5/47 (16.2 overs)		136 (56 overs); George Drissell 31 (63); Ben Allison 3/26 (15 overs)
81 (23.5 overs); Adam Hose 15 (35); Ben Raine 4/20 (8 overs)		108/4 (26.3 overs); Ben McKinney 34 (58); Matthew Waite 2/21 (5 overs)

Durham won by 6 wickets
New Road, Worcester
Umpires: Mike Burns and Graham Lloyd

- Durham won the toss and elected to field.
- Points: Durham 19, Worcestershire 3

=== May ===
2–5 May 2025
Scorecard

Durham	v	Hampshire
511 (148.2 overs); Graham Clark 160 (309); Liam Dawson 5/158 (48 overs)		470 (154.5 overs); Ben Brown 162 (175); Matthew Potts 4/84 (29 overs)
61/0 (25 overs); Alex Lees 30* (87)

Match drawn
Rose Bowl, Southampton
Umpires: Martin Saggers and Russell Warren

- Durham won the toss and elected to bat.
- Points: Durham 13, Hampshire 12

2–5 May 2025
Scorecard

Essex	v	Somerset
206 (88.2 overs); Noah Thain 41 (112); Migael Pretorius 3/24 (14 overs)		145 (46.3 overs); Josh Davey 27 (75); Simon Harmer 4/43 (19 overs)
259 (78.4 overs); Jordan Cox 103* (156); Migael Pretorius 3/36 (14 overs)		325/7 (93.4 overs); James Rew 116 (189); Simon Harmer 4/120 (38.4 overs)

Somerset won by 3 wickets
County Ground, Taunton
Umpires: Ben Debenham and Nigel Llong

- Somerset won the toss and elected to field.
- Points: Somerset 19, Essex 3

2–5 May 2025
Scorecard

Yorkshire	v	Warwickshire
205 (52.2 overs); Jonny Bairstow 47 (77); Ethan Bamber 5/47 (15.2 overs)		253 (61 overs); Beau Webster 85 (86); Ben Sears 4/45 (12 overs)
232 (70.2 overs); Joe Root 90 (131); Ethan Bamber 4/60 (20 overs)		186/5 (43.2 overs); Zen Malik 49* (73); Ben Sears 2/53 (10 overs)

Warwickshire won by 5 wickets
Headingley, Leeds
Umpires: Mike Burns and Rob White

- Warwickshire won the toss and elected to field.
- Zen Malik (Warwickshire) made his first-class debut.
- Points: Warwickshire 20, Yorkshire 2

9–12 May 2025
Scorecard

Essex	v	Yorkshire
123 (60.4 overs); Michael Pepper 30 (57); George Hill 6/51 (17.4 overs)		216 (77.5 overs); James Wharton 63* (145); Matt Critchley 4/49 (13.5 overs)
273/9 (133 overs); Matt Critchley 75 (246); Jack White 4/43 (24 overs)		426/6d (115.2 overs); Adam Lyth 185 (287); Noah Thain 3/96 (18 overs)

Match drawn
County Ground, Chelmsford
Umpires: Jack Shantry and Steve O'Shaughnessy

- Yorkshire won the toss and elected to bat
- Points: Essex 11, Yorkshire 11

9–12 May 2025
Scorecard

Warwickshire	v	Surrey
665/5d (160 overs); Tom Latham 184 (319); Tom Lawes 2/107 (27 overs)		504 (178.2 overs); Ben Foakes 174* (361); Rob Yates 3/124 (47 overs)
		15/0 (5 overs) (f/o); Rory Burns 5* (19)

Match drawn
Edgbaston, Birmingham
Umpires: Ian Blackwell and Neil Pratt

- Surrey won the toss and elected to field
- Zen Malik (Warwickshire) scored his first century in first-class cricket.
- Points: Warwickshire 13, Surrey 11

9–12 May 2025
Scorecard

Nottinghamshire	v	Hampshire
333 (91.1 overs); Freddie McCann 138 (217); Kyle Abbott 5/57 (21 overs)		196 (49.2 overs); Kyle Abbott 67 (51); Mohammad Abbas 5/31 (15 overs)
345 (91.1 overs); Liam Patterson-White 135 (213); Kyle Abbott 3/62 (20 overs)		116 (33.3 overs); Sonny Baker 27 (45); Lyndon James 5/22 (7 overs)

Nottinghamshire won by 366 runs
Trent Bridge, Nottingham
Umpires: Richard Kettleborough and Rob White

- Hampshire won the toss and elected to field
- Points: Nottinghamshire 21, Hampshire 3

9–12 May 2025
Scorecard

Sussex	v	Worcestershire
284 (90.3 overs); Jack Carson 102 (138); Tom Taylor 5/56 (22 overs)		180 (70.4 overs); Tom Taylor 32 (73); Fynn Hudson-Prentice 5/40 (14.4 overs)
256 (79.4 overs); Tom Alsop 72 (136); Ben Allison 3/52 (18 overs)		313 (106.2 overs); Jake Libby 167 (252); Aristides Karvelas 3/52 (17 overs)

Sussex won by 47 runs
County Ground, Hove
Umpires: Ben Debenham and James Middlebrook

- Worcestershire won the toss and elected to field
- James Hayes (Sussex) made his first-class debut.
- Points: Sussex 20, Worcestershire 3

16–19 May 2025
Scorecard

Nottinghamshire	v	Durham
407 (92.3 overs); Haseeb Hameed 206* (241); Codi Yusuf 4/99 (23 overs)		664 (174.1 overs); Ollie Robinson 141 (189); Liam Patterson-White 5/179 (50 overs)
347 (91.2 overs); Joe Clarke 119 (180); Codi Yusuf 2/67 (16.2 overs)		92/3 (16.2 overs); Colin Ackermann 53* (48); Mohammad Abbas 2/33 (6 overs)

Durham won by 7 wickets
Riverside Ground, Chester-le-Street
Umpires: Peter Hartley and Steve O'Shaughnessy

- Durham won the toss and elected to field.
- Durham's first innings score was the club's highest total in a first-class match.
- Points: Durham 22, Nottinghamshire 5

16–19 May 2025
Scorecard

Somerset	v	Sussex
338 (105.1 overs); Archie Vaughan 80 (134); Nathan McAndrew 4/71 (21.1 overs)		152 (46.2 overs); Daniel Hughes 38 (89); Migael Pretorius 3/24 (9.2 overs)
150/5 (39.2 overs); Lewis Gregory 89* (118); Ollie Robinson 2/27 (8 overs)		335 (97.2 overs) (f/o); John Simpson 82* (165); Jack Leach 4/51 (24.2 overs)

Somerset won by 5 wickets
County Ground, Taunton
Umpires: Mike Burns and Tom Lungley

- Sussex won the toss and elected to field.
- Points: Somerset 21, Sussex 3

16–19 May 2025
Scorecard

Yorkshire	v	Surrey
255 (80.5 overs); Jonny Bairstow 89 (114); Jordan Clark 3/31 (16.4 overs)		512 (140.4 overs); Ben Foakes 86 (149); George Hill 5/66 (28 overs)
229 (82.1 overs); Jonny Bairstow 77 (104); Jordan Clark 4/45 (15.1 overs)

Surrey won by an innings and 28 runs
The Oval, London
Umpires: David Millns and Mark Newell

- Surrey won the toss and elected to field.
- Points: Surrey 22, Yorkshire 3

16–19 May 2025
Scorecard

Hampshire	v	Warwickshire
300 (85.4 overs); James Fuller 52* (52); Ed Barnard 4/56 (20 overs)		194 (55.4 overs); Ed Barnard 58 (55); Kyle Abbott 5/47 (18 overs)
203 (57.4 overs); Fletcha Middleton 76 (124); Beau Webster 4/57 (14.4 overs)		220 (68 overs); Alex Davies 66 (106); James Fuller 5/56 (18 overs)

Hampshire won by 89 runs
Edgbaston, Birmingham
Umpires: Ben Debenham and Nigel Llong

- Hampshire won the toss and elected to bat.
- Points: Hampshire 21, Warwickshire 3

16–19 May 2025
Scorecard

Worcestershire	v	Essex
358 (99.2 overs); Matthew Waite 73 (91); Shane Snater 4/78 (24.2 overs)		157 (60 overs); Robin Das 44 (91); Matthew Waite 3/34 (12 overs)
134 (57.3 overs); Ethan Brookes 38 (70); Simon Harmer 4/37 (21 overs)		110 (43.5 overs); Charlie Allison 23 (44); Matthew Waite 6/19 (10.5 overs)

Worcestershire won by 225 runs
New Road, Worcester
Umpires: Ian Blackwell and Graham Lloyd

- Essex won the toss and elected to field.
- Points: Worcestershire 22, Essex 3

23–26 May 2025
Scorecard

Durham	v	Somerset
277 (77 overs); Ollie Robinson 52 (55); Matt Henry 4/60 (20 overs)		172 (38.4 overs); Jack Leach 30 (38); Mitchell Killeen 5/36 (10 overs)
159 (43 overs); Alex Lees 35 (50); Migael Pretorius 3/46 (11 overs)		267/3 (77.1 overs); Tom Lammonby 104* (161); Colin Ackermann 1/40 (15 overs)

Somerset won by 7 wickets
Riverside Ground, Chester-le-Street
Umpires: Richard Kettleborough and James Middlebrook

- Durham won the toss and elected to bat.
- Mitchell Killeen (Durham) took his first five-wicket haul in first-class cricket.
- Points: Somerset 19, Durham 4

23–26 May 2025
Scorecard

Hampshire	v	Sussex
154 (52.3 overs); Ben Brown 53* (98); Henry Crocombe 4/27 (10 overs)		297 (105 overs); John Simpson 106 (225); John Turner 3/54 (15 overs)
165 (47 overs); Liam Dawson 48 (67); Jack Carson 5/26 (10 overs)		23/1 (4.4 overs); Tom Haines 10* (11); Liam Dawson 1/5 (2.4 overs)

Sussex won by 9 wickets
Rose Bowl, Southampton
Umpires: Tom Lungley and Rob White

- Hampshire won the toss and elected to bat.
- Points: Sussex 20, Hampshire -5

23–26 May 2025
Scorecard

Essex	v	Surrey
217 (62.2 overs); Michael Pepper 75 (94); Nathan Smith 3/53 (14 overs)		279 (72.4 overs); Sam Curran 70 (83); Kasun Rajitha 5/87 (22 overs)
479 (139.1 overs); Charlie Allison 140 (235); Daniel Worrall 4/77 (33 overs)		289/7 (84 overs); Sam Curran 77 (121); Jamie Porter 5/88 (27 overs)

Match drawn
The Oval, London
Umpires: Rob Bailey and Mike Burns

- Surrey won the toss and elected to field.
- Points: Essex 11, Surrey 12

23–26 May 2025
Scorecard

Warwickshire	v	Worcestershire
227 (77.2 overs); Sam Hain 86 (152); Tom Taylor 4/37 (15 overs)		181 (69.1 overs); Jake Libby 45 (66); Chris Rushworth 4/37 (16 overs)
280 (90.5 overs); Sam Hain 87* (174); Jacob Duffy 5/75 (21.5 overs)		181/8 (61.2 overs); Matthew Waite 44* (55); Chris Rushworth 3/30 (17 overs)

Match drawn
New Road, Worcester
Umpires: Steve O'Shaughnessy and Jack Shantry

- Warwickshire won the toss and elected to bat.
- Points: Warwickshire 11, Worcestershire 11

23–26 May 2025
Scorecard

Nottinghamshire	v	Yorkshire
228 (81.2 overs); Joe Clarke 64 (151); George Hill 5/40 (20 overs)		159 (44.3 overs); Dawid Malan 64 (45); Mohammad Abbas 6/45 (17.3 overs)
393/8d (98 overs); Joe Clarke 94 (121); Ben Coad 3/64 (25 overs)		299 (120.3 overs); James Wharton 58 (99); Dillon Pennington 5/106 (31 overs)

Nottinghamshire won by 163 runs
Headingley, Leeds
Umpires: Paul Baldwin and Nigel Llong

- Yorkshire won the toss and elected to field.
- Points: Nottinghamshire 19, Yorkshire 3

=== June ===
22–25 June 2025
Scorecard

Sussex	v	Durham
361 (106.5 overs); James Coles 148* (219); Bas de Leede 4/96 (25 overs)		327 (106 overs); Colin Ackermann 65 (148); Gurinder Sandhu 5/83 (23 overs)
322/6d (111.2 overs); Danial Ibrahim 121* (315); Matthew Potts 2/44 (18 overs)

Match drawn
Riverside Ground, Chester-le-Street
Umpires: Peter Hartley and Tom Lungley

- Sussex won the toss and elected to bat.
- Points: Sussex 14, Durham 13

22–25 June 2025
Scorecard

Essex	v	Hampshire
296 (98.1 overs); Charlie Allison 101 (192); Kyle Abbott 5/26 (19.1 overs)		453 (138.1 overs); Liam Dawson 139 (235); Matt Critchley 4/102 (30 overs)
358/6d (119 overs); Michael Pepper 140 (154); Liam Dawson 4/82 (41 overs)

Match drawn
County Ground, Chelmsford
Umpires: Rob Bailey and James Middlebrook

- Essex won the toss and elected to bat.
- Mackenzie Jones (Essex) made his first-class debut.
- Points: Essex 10, Hampshire 14

22–25 June 2025
Scorecard

Nottinghamshire	v	Yorkshire
487 (132.4 overs); Ben Slater 96 (224); Dan Moriarty 4/91 (30.4 overs)		510 (185.4 overs); Finlay Bean 224 (489); Freddie McCann 3/53 (15.4 overs)
148/1d (48 overs); Ben Slater 74* (145); Dan Moriarty 1/43 (21 overs)

Match drawn
Trent Bridge, Nottingham
Umpires: Steve O'Shaughnessy and Russell Warren

- Nottinghamshire won the toss and elected to bat.
- Finlay Bean (Yorkshire) scored his maiden double century in first-class cricket.
- Points: Nottinghamshire 12, Yorkshire 12

22–25 June 2025
Scorecard

Somerset	v	Warwickshire
498 (133.3 overs); Tom Lammonby 133 (196); Rob Yates 3/44 (17.3 overs)		351 (121.1 overs); Sam Hain 78 (158); Craig Overton 4/61 (27 overs)
229/8d (53.1 overs); James Rew 61 (81); Corey Rocchiccioli 5/67 (16.1 overs)		161/4 (56 overs); Sam Hain 68* (157); Craig Overton 1/16 (8 overs)

Match drawn
Edgbaston, Birmingham
Umpires: Michael Gough and Graham Lloyd

- Somerset won the toss and elected to bat.
- Points: Somerset 14, Warwickshire 11

22–25 June 2025
Scorecard

Worcestershire	v	Surrey
214 (78.5 overs); Matthew Waite 68 (113); Jordan Clark 3/38 (13.5 overs)		291 (91.3 overs); Dom Sibley 73 (184); Ben Allison 5/44 (18.3 overs)
125 (36 overs); Adam Hose 40 (68); Nathan Smith 6/38 (11 overs)		53/1 (15 overs); Ryan Patel 35* (55); Fateh Singh 1/33 (5 overs)

Surrey won by 9 wickets
New Road, Worcester
Umpires: Nigel Llong and Surendiran Shanmugam

- Worcestershire won the toss and elected to bat.
- Points: Surrey 20, Worcestershire 3

29 June–2 July 2025
Scorecard

Worcestershire	v	Hampshire
679/7d (160 overs); Adam Hose 266 (253); James Fuller 3/121 (25 overs)		221 (90.3 overs); Tilak Varma 56 (171); Tom Taylor 4/42 (19 overs)
		294/4 (117 overs) (f/o); Ben Brown 109* (270); Adam Finch 2/29 (19 overs)

Match drawn
Rose Bowl, Southampton
Umpires: Ian Blackwell and Jack Shantry

- Worcestershire won the toss and elected to bat.
- Adam Hose (Worcestershire) scored his maiden double century in first-class cricket.
- Points: Worcestershire 16, Hampshire 9

29 June–2 July 2025
Scorecard

Somerset	v	Nottinghamshire
379 (119 overs); Tom Banton 84 (179); Mohammad Abbas 3/59 (27 overs)		509 (163.2 overs); Jack Haynes 157 (295); Jack Leach 6/121 (53.2 overs)
238/4d (75 overs); Tom Kohler-Cadmore 147* (196); Liam Patterson-White 4/104 (33 overs)

Match drawn
County Ground, Taunton
Umpires: Nigel Llong and Rob White

- Somerset won the toss and elected to bat.
- Points: Somerset 11, Nottinghamshire 12

29 June–2 July 2025
Scorecard

Surrey	v	Durham
820/9d (161.3 overs); Dom Sibley 305 (475); Will Rhodes 3/131 (28 overs)		362 (131.1 overs); Alex Lees 125 (240); Daniel Worrall 4/60 (25 overs)
		262/0 (55.4 overs) (f/o); Emilio Gay 156* (172)

Match drawn
The Oval, London
Umpires: Mike Burns and Graham Lloyd

- Durham won the toss and elected to field.
- Dom Sibley (Surrey) scored his maiden triple century in first-class cricket.
- Points: Surrey 15, Durham 11

29 June–2 July 2025
Scorecard

Warwickshire	v	Sussex
415 (107.5 overs); Rob Yates 93 (142); Henry Crocombe 3/82 (19 overs)		533 (151.4 overs); Daniel Hughes 151 (260); Corey Rocchiccioli 6/173 (54.4 overs)
260/4d (88 overs); Tom Latham 69 (140); James Coles 2/49 (20.3 overs)

Match drawn
County Ground, Hove
Umpires: David Millns and Steve O'Shaughnessy

- Warwickshire won the toss and elected to bat.
- Points: Warwickshire 13, Sussex 14

29 June–2 July 2025
Scorecard

Essex	v	Yorkshire
368 (136 overs); Tom Westley 107 (239); Jack White 3/68 (27 overs)		459 (131.2 overs); Matt Revis 150 (187); Shane Snater 4/93 (33 overs)
131 (59.1 overs); Jordan Cox 55 (108); Jack White 4/37 (20.1 overs)		41/0 (9 overs); Finlay Bean 18* (32)

Yorkshire won by 10 wickets
Clifton Park, York
Umpires: Michael Gough and Peter Hartley

- Essex won the toss and elected to bat.
- Points: Yorkshire 20, Essex 3

=== July ===
22–25 July 2025
Scorecard

Nottinghamshire	v	Hampshire
578/8d (132.3 overs); Lyndon James 203* (236); Kyle Abbott 3/117 (30 overs)		454 (178.3 overs); Felix Organ 122* (352); Liam Patterson-White 3/115 (56.3 overs)
108/1d (34 overs); Freddie McCann 52* (103); James Fuller 1/16 (6 overs)

Match drawn
Rose Bowl, Southampton
Umpires: Ben Debenham and David Millns

- Hampshire won the toss and elected to field.
- Lyndon James (Nottinghamshire) scored his maiden double century in first-class cricket.
- Points: Nottinghamshire 14, Hampshire 12

22–25 July 2025
Scorecard

Durham	v	Somerset
145 (30.1 overs); Ben Raine 42 (38); Craig Overton 6/23 (10 overs)		250 (49.3 overs); Tom Lammonby 89 (109); George Drissell 5/59 (13.3 overs)
190 (58.2 overs); Emilio Gay 42 (46); Jack Leach 6/63 (25 overs)		89/5 (19.2 overs); Tom Banton 33* (22); Callum Parkinson 4/39 (10 overs)

Somerset won by 5 wickets
County Ground, Taunton
Umpires: Ian Blackwell and Martin Saggers

- Somerset won the toss and elected to field.
- George Drissell (Durham) took his maiden five-wicket haul in first-class cricket.
- Points: Somerset 20, Durham 3

22–25 July 2025
Scorecard

Sussex	v	Essex
204 (52.4 overs); James Coles 52 (70); Jamie Porter 4/30 (12.4 overs)		504 (118 overs); Jordan Cox 132 (173); Fynn Hudson-Prentice 3/78 (22 overs)
261 (82.1 overs); James Coles 108 (214); Matt Critchley 4/41 (18.1 overs)

Essex won by an innings and 39 runs
County Ground, Hove
Umpires: Rob Bailey and Mark Newell

- Essex won the toss and elected to field.
- Points: Essex 24, Sussex 2

22–25 July 2025
Scorecard

Worcestershire	v	Warwickshire
333 (108.1 overs); Ethan Brookes 140 (169); Ed Barnard 2/47 (16 overs)		184 (58.5 overs); Kai Smith 68 (100); Khurram Shahzad 6/42 (16 overs)
243 (86.4 overs); Ethan Brookes 87 (137); Beau Webster 3/39 (14.4 overs)		396/5 (93.2 overs); Zen Malik 142 (222); Tom Taylor 2/80 (21 overs)

Warwickshire won by 5 wickets
Edgbaston, Birmingham
Umpires: Michael Gough and Steve O'Shaughnessy

- Worcestershire won the toss and elected to bat.
- Points: Warwickshire 19, Worcestershire 5

22–25 July 2025
Scorecard

Yorkshire	v	Surrey
517/6d (130 overs); Matt Revis 110* (134); Daniel Worrall 3/94 (28 overs)		537 (120 overs); Ryan Patel 92 (142); Dom Bess 7/162 (35 overs)
120/5 (56.3 overs); Adam Lyth 34 (79); Will Jacks 2/37 (19 overs)

Match drawn
North Marine Road, Scarborough
Umpires: Nigel Llong and Russell Warren

- Yorkshire won the toss and elected to bat.
- Only 24.1 overs of play was possible on Day 2 due to rain.
- Points: Yorkshire 13, Surrey 14

29 July–1 August 2025
Scorecard

Durham	v	Surrey
153 (55.1 overs); Colin Ackermann 51 (104); Daniel Worrall 4/31 (12 overs)		322 (68.1 overs); Dan Lawrence 88 (116); Ben Raine 5/72 (20.1 overs)
344 (113.4 overs); Emilio Gay 99 (108); Sai Kishore 5/72 (41.4 overs)		176/5 (38.2 overs); Sam Curran 40 (40); Callum Parkinson 3/58 (16 overs)

Surrey won by 5 wickets
Riverside Ground, Chester-le-Street
Umpires: James Middlebrook and Steve O'Shaughnessy

- Durham won the toss and elected to bat.
- Points: Surrey 21, Durham 3

29 July–1 August 2025
Scorecard

Essex	v	Warwickshire
602/6d (149 overs); Tom Westley 148 (278); Beau Webster 2/55 (22 over)		485 (133.4 overs); Ed Barnard 108* (123); Matt Critchley 5/171 (40 overs)
96/1 (31 overs); Tom Westley 51* (103); Ethan Bamber 1/21 (5 overs)

Match drawn
County Ground, Chelmsford
Umpires: Ian Blackwell and Tom Lungley

- Warwickshire won the toss and elected to field.
- Vansh Jani (Warwickshire) made his first-class debut.
- Ethan Bamber (Warwickshire) scored his maiden century in first-class cricket.
- Points: Essex 14, Warwickshire 12

29 July–1 August 2025
Scorecard

Somerset	v	Nottinghamshire
438 (132.3 overs); James Rew 166 (278); Dillon Pennington 3/71 (23 overs)		544 (159.2 overs); Haseeb Hameed 208 (388); Jake Ball 3/76 (22 overs)
200/5d (66 overs); Tom Abell 51 (116); Calvin Harrison 3/57 (24 overs)

Match drawn
Trent Bridge, Nottingham
Umpires: Rob Bailey and Mike Burns

- Nottinghamshire won the toss and elected to field.
- Points: Somerset 12, Nottinghamshire 13

29 July–1 August 2025
Scorecard

Hampshire	v	Worcestershire
293 (87.3 overs); Fletcha Middleton 79 (101); Tom Taylor 5/55 (21.3 overs)		249 (91.1 overs); Jake Libby 100* (235); Sonny Baker 5/72 (20.1 overs)
313/7d (80 overs); Nick Gubbins 84 (137); Ethan Brookes 2/54 (14 overs)		303/8 (52.5 overs); Jake Libby 106 (122); Eddie Jack 3/63 (11 overs)

Match drawn
New Road, Worcester
Umpires: Richard Illingworth and Surendiran Shanmugam

- Worcestershire won the toss and elected to field.
- Only 39.2 overs of play was possible on day 1 due to rain.
- Points: Hampshire 12, Worcestershire 13

29 July–1 August 2025
Scorecard

Sussex	v	Yorkshire
222 (99.5 overs); Danny Lamb 48 (157); Jack White 3/24 (19 overs)		545/9d (140); Matt Revis 152* (188); Jack Carson 3/150 (43 overs)
195 (96.4 overs); Daniel Hughes 57 (143); Matt Milnes 5/31 (16.4 overs)

Yorkshire won by an innings and 128 runs
North Marine Road, Scarborough
Umpires: Peter Hartley and Richard Kettleborough

- Yorkshire won the toss and elected to field.
- Points: Yorkshire 22, Sussex 2

=== September ===
8–11 September 2025
Scorecard

Durham	v	Essex
333 (100.2 overs); Ben McKinney 121 (228); Jamie Porter 4/77 (23.2 overs)		457/8d (128 overs); Dean Elgar 150 (283); Matthew Potts 3/95 (30 overs)
173/7 (66.2 overs); Ben Raine 42* (71); Jamie Porter 3/36 (16.2 overs)

Match drawn
County Ground, Chelmsford
Umpires: Ian Blackwell and James Middlebrook

- Durham won the toss and elected to bat.
- Only 39 overs play was possible on day 3 due to rain.
- Points: Durham 12, Essex 14

8–11 September 2025
Scorecard

Somerset	v	Yorkshire
441/6d (127 overs); Tom Abell 130 (227); George Hill 2/63 (23 overs)		134/9d (38 overs); Jordan Thompson 57 (48); Josh Davey 3/34 (11 overs)

Match drawn
County Ground, Taunton
Umpires: Rob Bailey and Mark Newell

- Yorkshire won the toss and elected to field.
- Only 42 and 10.3 overs play was possible on day 1 and 3 respectively due to rain.
- Points: Somerset 14, Yorkshire 9

8–11 September 2025
Scorecard

Surrey	v	Warwickshire
246 (59.5 overs); Ryan Patel 72* (67); Nathan Gilchrist 3/51 (11 overs)		248 (75 overs); Will Young 72 (166); Tom Lawes 4/42 (16 overs)
391/8d (76.1 overs); Dom Sibley 103* (188); Michael Booth 4/58 (16 overs)		105/1 (39 overs); Rob Yates 34* (109); Tom Lawes 1/25 (9 overs)

Match drawn
The Oval, London
Umpires: Michael Gough and Jack Shantry

- Warwickshire won the toss and elected to field.
- Only 21.1 overs play was possible on day 3 due to rain.
- Points: Surrey 11, Warwickshire 11

8–11 September 2025
Scorecard

Hampshire	v	Sussex
226 (71.3 overs); Ben Brown 71 (129); Jack Carson 3/31 (10 overs)		122 (51.4 overs); Tom Alsop 39 (75); Bjorn Fortuin 4/30 (12.4 overs)
173 (50.1 overs); James Fuller 49 (69); James Coles 4/47 (13 overs)		84/3 (13 overs); Tom Haines 40* (86); Keith Barker 2/34 (13 overs)

Match drawn
County Ground, Hove
Umpires: Nigel Llong and Rob White

- Sussex won the toss and elected to field.
- No play was possible on day 3 due to rain.
- Points: Hampshire 11, Sussex 11

8–11 September 2025
Scorecard

Worcestershire	v	Nottinghamshire
182 (52.5 overs); Gareth Roderick 61 (110); Dillon Pennington 4/50 (16 overs)		207 (70.2 overs); Freddie McCann 56 (106); Tom Taylor 4/70 (20 overs)
160 (61.5 overs); Gareth Roderick 37* (116); Lyndon James 5/35 (15.5 overs)		136/7 (52 overs); Ben Slater 36 (94); Ben Allison 3/50 (14 overs)

Nottinghamshire won by 3 wickets
New Road, Worcester
Umpires: Ben Debenham and Tom Lungley

- Nottinghamshire won the toss and elected to field.
- Only 40.2 overs play was possible on day 3 due to rain.
- Daniel Lategan (Worcestershire) made his first-class debut.
- Points: Nottinghamshire 19, Worcestershire -1

15–18 September 2025
Scorecard

Worcestershire	v	Durham
591/9d (174); Gareth Roderick 151 (278); Sam Conners 3/105 (32 overs)		450/6 (86.4 overs); Emilio Gay 161 (182); Matthew Waite 2/46 (9 overs)

Match drawn
Riverside Ground, Chester-le-Street
Umpires: Rob Bailey and Richard Kettleborough

- Durham won the toss and elected to field.
- No play was possible on day 1 due to rain.
- Points: Durham 14, Worcestershire 12

15–18 September 2025
Scorecard

Somerset	v	Hampshire
454/8d (103 overs); Kasey Aldridge 180 (233); Keith Barker 2/41 (15 overs)		172 (54.3 overs); Toby Albert 29 (27); Jack Leach 7/69 (24.3 overs)
		201/8 (126.5 overs) (f/o); Washington Sundar 46 (56); Archie Vaughan 6/96 (50 overs)

Match drawn
County Ground, Taunton
Umpires: Ben Debenham and David Millns

- Somerset won the toss and elected to bat.
- No play was possible on day 1 due to rain.
- Josh Thomas made his first-class debut after replacing Tom Abell as a concussion substitute for Somerset during the second innings of Hampshire.
- Points: Somerset 16, Hampshire 10

15–18 September 2025
Scorecard

Nottinghamshire	v	Surrey
231 (77.4 overs); Ben Slater 50 (99); Matthew Fisher 5/61 (19.4 overs)		173 (52.2 overs); Rory Burns 47 (97); Lyndon James 3/35 (9 overs)
256 (67 overs); Liam Patterson-White 58 (90); Matthew Fisher 6/73 (20 overs)		294 (71.2 overs); Dan Lawrence 50 (56); Josh Tongue 5/100 (21.2 overs)

Nottinghamshire won by 20 runs
The Oval, London
Umpires: Ian Blackwell and Nigel Llong

- Surrey won the toss and elected to field.
- Matthew Fisher (Surrey) took his maiden ten-wicket haul in first-class cricket.
- Points: Nottinghamshire 18, Surrey 3

15–18 September 2025
Scorecard

Yorkshire	v	Sussex
194 (64.1 overs); Adam Lyth 47 (93); Fynn Hudson-Prentice 3/33 (9 overs)		250 (79.2 overs); John Simpson 66 (136); George Hill 4/43 (19.2 overs)
109/3 (37 overs); Jonny Bairstow 64* (100); James Coles 3/45 (18 overs)

Match drawn
County Ground, Hove
Umpires: Tom Lungley and Jack Shantry

- Yorkshire won the toss and elected to bat.
- No play was possible on day 1 due to rain.
- Points: Sussex 12, Yorkshire 11

15–18 September 2025
Scorecard

Essex	v	Warwickshire
325/5 (104 overs); Charlie Allison 98 (175); Ethan Bamber 2/52 (21 overs)

Match drawn
Edgbaston, Birmingham
Umpires: Peter Hartley and Mark Newell

- Warwickshire won the toss and elected to field.
- No play was possible on day 1, 3 and 4 due to rain.
- Charlie Bennett (Essex) made his first-class debut.
- Points: Essex 10, Warwickshire 9

24–27 September 2025
Scorecard

Somerset	v	Essex
433 (122.2 overs); Lewis Goldsworthy 100 (193); Jamie Porter 3/66 (27 overs)		438 (106 overs); Paul Walter 158 (167); Craig Overton 6/88 (27 overs)
99 (33.3 overs); Josh Thomas 39 (65); Jamie Porter 4/18 (12 overs)		99/3 (18.1 overs); Charlie Allison 32* (34); Lewis Gregory 2/43 (9 overs)

Essex won by 7 wickets
County Ground, Chelmsford
Umpires: Nigel Llong and Russell Warren

- Somerset won the toss and elected to bat.
- Points: Essex 22, Somerset 6

24–27 September 2025
Scorecard

Surrey	v	Hampshire
147 (47.2 overs); Dan Lawrence 36 (60); Washington Sundar 3/5 (3.2 overs)		248 (79.4 overs); Washington Sundar 56 (110); Ralphie Albert 2/7 (7 overs)
281 (85.3 overs); Ralphie Albert 63 (90); Kyle Abbott 5/72 (23 overs)		160 (59 overs); Ali Orr 48 (96); Rahul Chahar 8/51 (24 overs)

Surrey won by 20 runs
Rose Bowl, Southampton
Umpires: James Middlebrook and Rob White

- Surrey won the toss and elected to bat.
- Ralphie Albert (Surrey) made his first-class debut.
- Points: Surrey 19, Hampshire 3

24–27 September 2025
Scorecard

Warwickshire	v	Nottinghamshire
258 (85.4 overs); Dan Mousley 74 (96); Brett Hutton 4/46 (20.4 overs)		374 (97.3 overs); Haseeb Hameed 122 (211); Ed Barnard 3/61 (19 overs)
133 (54 overs); Sam Hain 42 (94); Mohammad Abbas 3/18 (14 overs)		20/0 (3.4 overs); Ben Slater 15* (14)

Nottinghamshire won by 10 wickets
Trent Bridge, Nottingham
Umpires: Michael Gough and Martin Saggers

- Nottinghamshire won the toss and elected to field.
- Points: Nottinghamshire 22, Warwickshire 4

24–27 September 2025
Scorecard

Worcestershire	v	Sussex
123 (34.4 overs); Dan Lategan 41 (50); Ollie Robinson 6/68 (15.4 overs)		350 (65.4 overs); John Simpson 129* (160); Tom Taylor 4/106 (26 overs)
287 (75 overs); Jake Libby 72 (97); Ollie Robinson 5/74 (26 overs)		63/7 (15.2 overs); Daniel Hughes 16 (22); Tom Taylor 4/22 (8 overs)

Sussex won by 3 wickets
New Road, Worcester
Umpires: Graham Lloyd and David Millns

- Sussex won the toss and elected to field.
- Isaac Mohammed (Worcestershire) made his first-class debut.
- Points: Sussex 22, Worcestershire 3

24–27 September 2025
Scorecard

Durham	v	Yorkshire
346 (103.2 overs); Ben Raine 101 (105); Jack White 5/69 (20.2 overs)		475 (141.4 overs); Mayank Agarwal 175 (195); Ben Raine 5/76 (35.4 overs)
85 (44.5 overs); David Bedingham 28 (33); George Hill 4/14 (10.5 overs)

Yorkshire won by an innings and 44 runs
Headingley, Leeds
Umpires: Mike Burns and Steve O'Shaughnessy

- Durham won the toss and elected to bat.
- Points: Yorkshire 22, Durham 4

== Division Two ==
=== April ===
4–7 April 2025
Scorecard

Gloucestershire	v	Derbyshire
222 (70.4 overs); Graeme van Buuren 67 (109); Luis Reece 6/52 (20.4 overs)		391 (78.5 overs); Wayne Madsen 118 (166); Marchant de Lange 3/31 (13 overs)
259 (87.1 overs); Ben Charlesworth 110 (191); Luis Reece 4/45 (19.1 overs)		93/1 (19.3 overs); Caleb Jewell 51* (48); Tom Price 1/18 (3 overs)

Derbyshire won by 9 wickets
County Ground, Derby
Umpires: Neil Pratt and Chris Watts

- Derbyshire won the toss and elected to field.
- Luis Reece (Derbyshire) took his first ten-wicket haul in first-class cricket.
- Points: Derbyshire 22, Gloucestershire 3

4–7 April 2025
Scorecard

Glamorgan	v	Leicestershire
229 (74.3 overs); Chris Cooke 55 (102); Ben Mike 3/54 (12.3 overs)		427 (118 overs); Lewis Hill 96 (126); Andy Gorvin 4/51 (22 overs)
248 (86 overs); Kiran Carlson 113 (214); Ian Holland 4/46 (22 overs)		53/0 (6 overs); Sol Budinger 32* (20)

Leicestershire won by 10 wickets
Sophia Gardens, Cardiff
Umpires: Tom Lungley and Mark Newell

- Leicestershire won the toss and elected to field.
- Points: Leicestershire 23, Glamorgan 2

4–7 April 2025
Scorecard

Middlesex	v	Lancashire
260 (68.2 overs); Sam Robson 70 (83); Tom Aspinwall 4/32 (9.2 overs)		359 (123.3 overs); Marcus Harris 138 (197); Zafar Gohar 4/79 (28.3 overs)
407 (119.4 overs); Max Holden 184 (335); Tom Bailey 5/79 (26 overs)		262/8 (66.5 overs); Marcus Harris 52 (71); Zafar Gohar 3/64 (23 overs)

Match drawn
Lord's, London
Umpires: Paul Baldwin and Surendiran Shanmugam

- Lancashire won the toss and elected to field.
- Ollie Sutton (Lancashire) made his first-class debut.
- Points: Middlesex 11, Lancashire 13

4–7 April 2025
Scorecard

Kent	v	Northamptonshire
231 (62.5 overs); Tawanda Muyeye 72 (106); Raphael Weatherall 3/32 (10 overs)		143 (42 overs); Rob Keogh 64 (81); Jaskaran Singh 4/35 (12 overs)
171 (55.3 overs); Joey Evison 52 (96); Raphael Weatherall 3/38 (10 overs)		114 (35.4 overs); George Bartlett 60* (79); Keith Dudgeon 7/36 (10.4 overs)

Kent won by 145 runs
County Ground, Northampton
Umpires: Hassan Adnan and Rob Bailey

- Northamptonshire won the toss and elected to field.
- Points: Kent 19, Northamptonshire 3

11–14 April 2025
Scorecard

Gloucestershire	v	Glamorgan
546 (137.5 overs); Cameron Bancroft 163 (267); Ned Leonard 3/122 (24 overs)		385 (107.5 overs); Colin Ingram 103 (174); Zaman Akhter 5/85 (20.5 overs)
		288/4 (88.3 overs) (f/o); Colin Ingram 77* (162); Matt Taylor 2/47 (15 overs)

Match drawn
County Ground, Bristol
Umpires: Naeem Ashraf and Paul Baldwin

- Glamorgan won the toss and elected to field.
- Points: Gloucestershire 15, Glamorgan 13

11–14 April 2025
Scorecard

Middlesex	v	Kent
222 (60.3 overs); Jack Davies 47* (77); Nathan Gilchrist 3/43 (16 overs)		218 (49 overs); Grant Stewart 56 (56); Blake Cullen 4/60 (11 overs)
311 (101.4 overs); Ben Geddes 75 (142); Grant Stewart 3/52 (22 overs)		316/2 (64.4 overs); Tawanda Muyeye 125 (127); Zafar Gohar 2/91 (20 overs)

Kent won by 8 wickets
St Lawrence Ground, Canterbury
Umpires: Surendiran Shanmugam and Jack Shantry

- Kent won the toss and elected to field.
- Points: Kent 19, Middlesex 3

11–14 April 2025
Scorecard

Northamptonshire	v	Lancashire
496 (143.1 overs); Saif Zaib 116 (170); Tom Hartley 3/91 (33.1 overs)		228 (82.1 overs); Keaton Jennings 96 (218); Calvin Harrison 4/34 (19 overs)
		351/9 (149 overs) (f/o); Josh Bohannon 155 (342); Calvin Harrison 7/119 (57 overs)

Match drawn
Old Trafford, Manchester
Umpires: Ben Debenham and Richard Illingworth

- Lancashire won the toss and elected to field.
- Calvin Harrison (Northamptonshire) took his first ten-wicket haul in first-class cricket.
- Points: Northamptonshire 15, Lancashire 10

11–14 April 2025
Scorecard

Leicestershire	v	Derbyshire
484 (107.2 overs); Logan van Beek 82 (103); Jack Morley 2/59 (21.2 overs)		393 (95.3 overs); Martin Andersson 101 (140); Logan van Beek 4/100 (23 overs)
357/9d (80 overs); Rehan Ahmed 77 (59); Blair Tickner 3/82 (14 overs)		305/4 (80 overs); Wayne Madsen 96 (114); Tom Scriven 1/27 (11 overs)

Match drawn
Grace Road, Leicester
Umpires: Hassan Adnan and Chris Watts

- Derbyshire won the toss and elected to field.
- Martin Andersson (Derbyshire) scored his first century in first-class cricket.
- Points: Leicestershire 16, Derbyshire 14

18–21 April 2025
Scorecard

Derbyshire	v	Northamptonshire
307 (81.5 overs); Brooke Guest 91 (137); Justin Broad 4/60 (18 overs)		500/8d (112 overs); Luke Procter 150 (272); Luis Reece 2/65 (19 overs)
202/3 (56 overs); Caleb Jewell 71 (97); Dom Leech 2/54 (9 overs)

Match drawn
County Ground, Derby
Umpires: Rob Bailey and Anthony Harris

- Northamptonshire won the toss and elected to field.
- Points: Derbyshire 12, Northamptonshire 16

18–21 April 2025
Scorecard

Gloucestershire	v	Kent
472 (110.5 overs); James Bracey 151* (224); Nathan Gilchrist 7/100 (26 overs)		393 (105.3 overs); Ben Compton 178 (298); Ben Charlesworth 2/44 (8 overs)
333/5d (86 overs); Miles Hammond 89 (136); Jack Leaning 3/106 (27 overs)		124/6 (40.3 overs); Zak Crawley 54* (112); Tom Price 4/33 (10 overs)

Match drawn
St Lawrence Ground, Canterbury
Umpires: Paul Baldwin and Chris Watts

- Kent won the toss and elected to field.
- Points: Gloucestershire 16, Kent 14

18–21 April 2025
Scorecard

Lancashire	v	Leicestershire
263 (96 overs); Marcus Harris 77 (150); Tom Scriven 5/46 (20 overs)		491/8d (123 overs); Peter Handscomb 142* (222); John Turner 2/44 (13 overs)
90/3 (24 overs); Josh Bohannon 45* (52); Ian Holland 2/22 (8 overs)

Match drawn
Old Trafford, Manchester
Umpires: Naeem Ashraf and Ian Blackwell

- Leicestershire won the toss and elected to field.
- Tom Scriven (Leicestershire) took his first five-wicket haul in first-class cricket.
- Points: Lancashire 11, Leicestershire 15

18–21 April 2025
Scorecard

Glamorgan	v	Middlesex
199 (69.5 overs); Zain-ul-Hassan 65 (124); Toby Roland-Jones 3/44 (15.5 overs)		470/9d (146 overs); Max Holden 107 (198); Ben Kellaway 4/61 (18 overs)
329 (108 overs); Chris Cooke 69 (151); Toby Roland-Jones 3/68 (23 overs)		59/1 (7.5 overs); Leus du Plooy 27* (21); Ned Leonard 1/29 (3.5 overs)

Middlesex won by 9 wickets
Lord's, London
Umpires: Ben Peverall and Neil Pratt

- Middlesex won the toss and elected to field.
- Points: Middlesex 21, Glamorgan 0

25–28 April 2025
Scorecard

Derbyshire	v	Middlesex
472 (155.3 overs); Martin Andersson 107 (167); Nathan Fernandes 3/53 (11.3 overs)		315 (110.1 overs); Ben Geddes 59 (93); Zak Chappell 4/55 (19 overs)
		307/7 (100 overs) (f/o); Max Holden 94 (135); Alex Thomson 2/53 (29 overs)

Match drawn
County Ground, Derby
Umpires: Ben Debenham and Sue Redfern

- Middlesex won the toss and elected to field.
- Points: Derbyshire 13, Middlesex 11

25–28 April 2025
Scorecard

Gloucestershire	v	Leicestershire
252 (69 overs); James Bracey 93* (141); Ben Green 5/63 (17 overs)		262 (84.1 overs); Lewis Hill 55 (105); Dominic Goodman 5/54 (20 overs)
152 (62.4 overs); Ollie Price 43 (101); Ian Holland 4/32 (17.4 overs)		146/8 (45.4 overs); Ben Cox 47 (74); Dominic Goodman 4/33 (11 overs)

Leicestershire won by 2 wickets
County Ground, Bristol
Umpires: Tom Lungley and Paul Pollard

- Leicestershire won the toss and elected to field.
- Ben Green (Leicestershire) took his first five-wicket haul in first-class cricket.
- Dominic Goodman (Gloucestershire) took his first five-wicket haul in first-class cricket.
- Points: Leicestershire 20, Gloucestershire 4

=== May ===
2–5 May 2025
Scorecard

Glamorgan	v	Derbyshire
431 (127.4 overs); Colin Ingram 81 (165); David Lloyd 2/18 (7.4 overs)		350 (107 overs); Luis Reece 73* (184); Andy Gorvin 5/85 (22 overs)
256/7d (82 overs); Ben Kellaway 74 (117); Blair Tickner 3/44 (19 overs)		308/9 (65 overs); Martin Andersson 78 (95); Ben Kellaway 5/101 (25 overs)

Match drawn
Sophia Gardens, Cardiff
Umpires: Tom Lungley and Mark Newell

- Derbyshire won the toss and elected to field.
- Points: Glamorgan 14, Derbyshire 13

2–5 May 2025
Scorecard

Lancashire	v	Gloucestershire
450 (128 overs); Marcus Harris 167 (269); Ajeet Singh Dale 3/67 (25 overs)		589/9d (158 overs); Ollie Price 253* (405); Tom Bailey 2/67 (21 overs)
255/8 (88 overs); Tom Hartley 37 (117); Tom Price 3/52 (17 overs)

Match drawn
Old Trafford, Manchester
Umpires: David Millns and Jack Shantry

- Lancashire won the toss and elected to bat.
- Points: Lancashire 12, Gloucestershire 13

2–5 May 2025
Scorecard

Leicestershire	v	Northamptonshire
304 (88.3 overs); Rishi Patel 105 (189); Harry Conway 5/68 (21.3 overs)		191 (67.3 overs); Justin Broad 36 (66); Logan van Beek 4/47 (16.3 overs)
175 (59.1 overs); Sol Budinger 39 (24); Ben Sanderson 6/72 (17.1 overs)		156 (58.2 overs); George Bartlett 37 (82); Josh Hull 3/13 (6 overs)

Leicestershire won by 132 runs
Grace Road, Leicester
Umpires: Graham Lloyd and Sue Redfern

- Northamptonshire won the toss and elected to field.
- Points: Leicestershire 21, Northamptonshire 3

2–5 May 2025
Scorecard

Middlesex	v	Kent
129 (50.3 overs); Tawanda Muyeye 29 (53); Toby Roland-Jones 5/33 (14 overs)		238 (65 overs); Ryan Higgins 54 (101); Joey Evison 3/43 (14 overs)
473 (130.5 overs); Daniel Bell-Drummond 223 (360); Toby Roland-Jones 3/107 (29 overs)		366/8 (119 overs); Luke Hollman 103 (192); Joey Evison 3/71 (24 overs)

Middlesex won by 2 wickets
Lord's, London
Umpires: Rob Bailey and Anthony Harris

- Kent won the toss and elected to bat.
- Luke Hollman (Middlesex) scored his first century in first-class cricket.
- Points: Middlesex 19, Kent 3

9–12 May 2025
Scorecard

Kent	v	Glamorgan
212 (74.1 overs); Chris Benjamin 94* (171); Timm van der Gugten 3/23 (12 overs)		549/9d (132 overs); Ben Kellaway 181* (228); Kashif Ali 4/92 (24 overs)
176 (48.2 overs) (f/o); Tawanda Muyeye 41 (56); Asitha Fernando 3/18 (7 overs)

Glamorgan won by an innings and 161 runs
St Lawrence Ground, Canterbury
Umpires: Sue Redfern and Mark Newell

- Kent won the toss and elected to field
- Ekansh Singh (Kent) made his first-class debut.
- Points: Glamorgan 23, Kent 2

9–12 May 2025
Scorecard

Northamptonshire	v	Lancashire
238; Lewis McManus 53 (89); George Balderson 4/55 (17.1 overs)		276; Marcus Harris 121 (230); Harry Conway 3/48 (17.1 overs)
273; Ben Sanderson 65 (28); Anderson Phillip 3/51 (17.2 overs)		165; Marcus Harris 43 (73); Calvin Harrison 4/32 (15 overs)

Northamptonshire won by 70 runs
County Ground, Northampton
Umpires: Surendiran Shanmugam and Tom Lungley

- Northamptonshire won the toss and elected to bat
- Points: Northamptonshire 19, Lancashire 4

16–19 May 2025
Scorecard

Northamptonshire	v	Glamorgan
185 (65.2 overs); Luke Procter 61 (134); Asitha Fernando 3/28 (11.2 overs)		424 (107.1 overs); Ben Kellaway 95 (104); Justin Broad 3/82 (20 overs)
304 (95.4 overs); Saif Zaib 71 (115); Asitha Fernando 3/42 (17.4 overs)		66/2 (16.2 overs); Asa Tribe 32* (44); Ben Sanderson 2/14 (6 overs)

Glamorgan won by 8 wickets
Sophia Gardens, Cardiff
Umpires: Hassan Adnan and Surendiran Shanmugam

- Northamptonshire won the toss and elected to bat.
- Points: Glamorgan 23, Northamptonshire 3

16–19 May 2025
Scorecard

Kent	v	Gloucestershire
424 (110.4 overs); Grant Stewart 182 (189); Ajeet Singh Dale 7/110 (26 overs)		516 (125 overs); Cameron Green 128 (184); Jake Ball 3/132 (30 overs)
253 (84.4 overs); Chris Benjamin 58 (149); Ben Charlesworth 3/5 (6 overs)		162/7 (43.1 overs); Cameron Green 67* (90); Nathan Gilchrist 4/43 (15 overs)

Gloucestershire won by 3 wickets
County Ground, Bristol
Umpires: Anthony Harris and James Tredwell

- Gloucestershire won the toss and elected to field.
- Points: Gloucestershire 24, Kent 6

16–19 May 2025
Scorecard

Lancashire	v	Derbyshire
458 (155.1 overs); Luke Wells 141 (270); Ben Aitchison 3/87 (26)		314 (97.3 overs); Brooke Guest 77 (154); James Anderson 3/53 (12 overs)
184/7d (40 overs); Matthew Hurst 56* (76); Jack Morley 3/54 (14 overs)		220/8 (87.5 overs); Harry Came 63 (94); Josh Bohannon 2/21 (7 overs)

Match drawn
Old Trafford, Manchester
Umpires: Paul Baldwin and Simon Widdup

- Derbyshire won the toss and elected to field.
- Points: Lancashire 13, Derbyshire 11

16–19 May 2025
Scorecard

Middlesex	v	Leicestershire
232 (86.2 overs); Jack Davies 49 (90); Ian Holland 5/35 (20.2 overs)		274 (96.4 overs); Peter Handscomb 87 (202); Zafar Gohar 4/34 (20 overs)
143 (57.5 overs); Luke Hollman 42 (107); Logan van Beek 3/28 (11 overs)		102/3 (24.3 overs); Sol Budinger 25 (22); Dane Paterson 1/25 (4 overs)

Leicestershire won by 7 wickets
Lord's, London
Umpires: Rob Bailey and Richard Kettleborough

- Leicestershire won the toss and elected to field.
- Naavya Sharma (Middlesex) made his first-class debut.
- Points: Leicestershire 20, Middlesex 3

23–26 May 2025
Scorecard

Derbyshire	v	Kent
587/5d (140 overs); Caleb Jewell 232 (361); Jack Leaning 2/85 (18 overs)		326 (98.5 overs); Ben Compton 156 (287); Anuj Dal 4/50 (22 overs)
		247 (70.4 overs) (f/o); Tawanda Muyeye 55 (71); Luis Reece 3/21 (10 overs)

Derbyshire won by an innings and 14 runs
County Ground, Derby
Umpires: Neil Pratt and Surendiran Shanmugam

- Derbyshire won the toss and elected to bat.
- Points: Derbyshire 23, Kent 2

23–26 May 2025
Scorecard

Glamorgan	v	Middlesex
383 (115.4 overs); Sam Northeast 122 (262); Ryan Higgins 5/59 (24.4 overs)		155 (52 overs); Max Holden 42 (60); Andy Gorvin 4/39 (10 overs)
8/0 (2.2 overs); Asa Tribe 6* (9)		235 (58.3 overs) (f/o); Sam Robson 66 (58); Matthew Kuhnemann 6/53 (22.3 overs)

Glamorgan won by 10 wickets
Sophia Gardens, Cardiff
Umpires: Ian Blackwell and James Tredwell

- Middlesex won the toss and elected to field.
- Points: Glamorgan 22, Middlesex 2

23–26 May 2025
Scorecard

Lancashire	v	Leicestershire
206 (77.4 overs); Luke Wells 36 (102); Logan van Beek 3/38 (16 overs)		457 (109.5 overs); Rehan Ahmed 136 (197); George Balderson 3/106 (27.5 overs)
248 (81.2 overs); Keaton Jennings 112 (203); Logan van Beek 4/61 (17 overs)

Leicestershire won by an innings and 3 runs
Grace Road, Leicester
Umpires: Hassan Adnan and David Millns

- Leicestershire won the toss and elected to field.
- Points: Leicestershire 24, Lancashire 3

23–26 May 2025
Scorecard

Northamptonshire	v	Gloucestershire
469 (139.2 overs); Saif Zaib 159 (241); Archie Bailey 3/76 (23 overs)		379/8d (111 overs); Cameron Green 118* (185); Calvin Harrison 4/94 (36.2 overs)
259/6d (49 overs); James Sales 70 (89); Archie Bailey 3/55 (12 overs)		214/6 (56.4 overs); Miles Hammond 80 (101); Harry Conway 2/33 (13.4 overs)

Match drawn
County Ground, Northampton
Umpires: Naeem Ashraf and Chris Watts

- Northamptonshire won the toss and elected to bat.
- Aadi Sharma (Northamptonshire) made his first-class debut.
- Points: Northamptonshire 13, Gloucestershire 13

=== June ===
22–25 June 2025
Scorecard

Gloucestershire	v	Derbyshire
187 (59.2 overs); Cameron Bancroft 58 (127); Jack Morley 6/55 (18.2 overs)		398 (105.5 overs); Wayne Madsen 123 (195); Todd Murphy 3/120 (31 overs)
526/6d (147 overs); Cameron Bancroft 176 (366); Alex Thomson 3/191 (48 overs)		296/8 (66.5 overs); Harry Came 91 (118); Graeme van Buuren 4/64 (18.5 overs)

Match drawn
County Ground, Bristol
Umpires: Mark Newell and Simon Widdup

- Gloucestershire won the toss and elected to bat.
- Points: Gloucestershire 11, Derbyshire 14

22–25 June 2025
Scorecard

Kent	v	Lancashire
372 (123.2 overs); Ben Compton 135 (296); George Balderson 3/54 (23 overs)		639/9d (142 overs); Ashton Turner 154 (148); Joey Evison 3/61 (21 overs)
328/8 (92 overs); Grant Stewart 130 (122); Chris Green 4/104 (38 overs)

Match drawn
Stanley Park, Blackpool
Umpires: David Millns and Sue Redfern

- Lancashire won the toss and elected to field.
- Mitchell Stanley (Lancashire) made his first-class debut.
- Points: Kent 11, Lancashire 14

22–25 June 2025
Scorecard

Glamorgan	v	Leicestershire
353 (110.2 overs); Asa Tribe 107 (173); Ben Green 3/55 (24 overs)		576/7d (129 overs); Sol Budinger 118 (102); Zain-ul-Hassan 2/90 (27 overs)
342/6d (121 overs); Sam Northeast 139 (274); Logan van Beek 2/47 (18 overs)

Match drawn
Grace Road, Leicester
Umpires: Naeem Ashraf and Rob White

- Glamorgan won the toss and elected to bat.
- Asa Tribe (Glamorgan) and Sol Budinger (Leicestershire) both scored their maiden century in first-class cricket.
- Points: Glamorgan 13, Leicestershire 16

22–25 June 2025
Scorecard

Middlesex	v	Northamptonshire
413 (101 overs); Joe Cracknell 112 (173); Liam Guthrie 7/94 (21 overs)		435 (125.2 overs); Saif Zaib 102 (170); Zafar Gohar 5/121 (42 overs)
332/8d (78 overs); Josh de Caires 87 (144); Calvin Harrison 4/107 (25 overs)		313/6 (62.3 overs); James Sales 108 (120); Toby Roland-Jones 2/48 (13 overs)

Northamptonshire won by 4 wickets
County Ground, Northampton
Umpires: Hassan Adnan and Chris Watts

- Middlesex won the toss and elected to bat.
- Joe Cracknell (Middlesex) scored his maiden century in first-class cricket.
- Points: Northamptonshire 22, Middlesex 7

29 June–2 July 2025
Scorecard

Lancashire	v	Derbyshire
367 (93.2 overs); Chris Green 121 (167); Zak Chappell 4/73 (17 overs)		261 (67 overs); Martin Andersson 79 (107); George Balderson 4/71 (18 overs)
406/6d (73.5 overs); Ashton Turner 121* (135); Ben Aitchison 3/64 (14 overs)		251 (83.4 overs); Wayne Madsen 95* (158); George Balderson 4/54 (22 overs)

Lancashire won by 261 runs
Queen's Park, Chesterfield
Umpires: Paul Baldwin and James Tredwell

- Lancashire won the toss and elected to bat.
- Chris Green (Lancashire) scored his maiden century in first-class cricket.
- Points: Lancashire 22, Derbyshire 4

29 June–2 July 2025
Scorecard

Gloucestershire	v	Glamorgan
380 (120.1 overs); James Bracey 133 (197); Timm van der Gugten 4/61 (26 overs)		528 (151.1 overs); Ben Kellaway 139 (239); Graeme van Buuren 3/87 (35 overs)
255/7d (95 overs); Miles Hammond 84 (170); Ben Kellaway 6/111 (38 overs)

Match drawn
Sophia Gardens, Cardiff
Umpires: Anthony Harris and Chris Watts

- Glamorgan won the toss and elected to field.
- Points: Gloucestershire 12, Glamorgan 14

29 June–2 July 2025
Scorecard

Kent	v	Northamptonshire
566/8d (155.5 overs); Daniel Bell-Drummond 158 (275); Liam Guthrie 3/92 (25 overs)		722/6d (146 overs); Saif Zaib 196* (213); Jaydn Denly 2/148 (24 overs)
160/8 (61 overs); Joey Evison 49* (104); Yuzvendra Chahal 4/51 (30 overs)

Match drawn
St Lawrence Ground, Canterbury
Umpires: Rob Bailey and Ben Peverall

- Kent won the toss and elected to bat.
- Justin Broad and Calvin Harrison (Northamptonshire) both scored their maiden century in first-class cricket.
- Points: Kent 13, Northamptonshire 14

29 June–2 July 2025
Scorecard

Middlesex	v	Leicestershire
534 (154.3 overs); Ben Geddes 137 (208); Ben Green 3/54 (28 overs)		205 (74 overs); Rishi Patel 51 (86); Naavya Sharma 4/43 (13 overs)
		202 (53.2 overs) (f/o); Logan van Beek 36* (59); Noah Cornwell 3/60 (14.2 overs)

Middlesex won by an innings and 127 runs
Grace Road, Leicester
Umpires: Ben Debenham and Neil Pratt

- Leicestershire won the toss and elected to field.
- Points: Middlesex 22, Leicestershire 2

=== July ===
22–25 July 2025
Scorecard

Leicestershire	v	Derbyshire
398 (117.1 overs); Lewis Hill 151 (310); Luis Reece 6/56 (25 overs)		189 (71.1 overs); Harry Came 56 (122); Rehan Ahmed 6/51 (20 overs)
236/9d (42.3 overs); Ian Holland 90 (99); Luis Reece 5/64 (16 overs)		256 (116.3 overs); Alex Thomson 55 (130); Rehan Ahmed 7/93 (40 overs)

Leicestershire won by 189 runs
County Ground, Derby
Umpires: Neil Pratt and Jack Shantry

- Leicestershire won the toss and elected to bat.
- Points: Leicestershire 22, Derbyshire 2

22–25 July 2025
Scorecard

Kent	v	Glamorgan
155 (53.2 overs); Daniel Bell-Drummond 42 (81); Timm van der Gugten 3/27 (15 overs)		327 (100.5 overs); Ben Kellaway 90 (174); Wes Agar 4/58 (17 overs)
360 (114.3 overs); Harry Finch 68 (125); Kiran Carlson 3/24 (5 overs)		189/5 (45.5 overs); Kiran Carlson 89* (155); Matt Parkinson 4/82 (18.5 overs)

Glamorgan won by 5 wickets
Sophia Gardens, Cardiff
Umpires: Paul Baldwin and Chris Watts

- Glamorgan won the toss and elected to field.
- Points: Glamorgan 21, Kent -5

22–25 July 2025
Scorecard

Lancashire	v	Gloucestershire
557 (141.4 overs); Chris Green 160 (199); Zaman Akhter 4/85 (25 overs)		381 (113.4 overs); Ben Charlesworth 160 (249); Tom Hartley 6/116 (34.4 overs)
111/1 (21 overs); Keaton Jennings 57* (67); Todd Murphy 1/32 (8 overs)		285 (98 overs) (f/o); Ben Charlesworth 71 (122); Tom Hartley 5/99 (28 overs)

Lancashire won by 9 wickets
College Ground, Cheltenham
Umpires: Richard Illingworth and James Tredwell

- Lancashire won the toss and elected to bat.
- Tom Hartley (Lancashire) scored his maiden century in first-class cricket.
- Points: Lancashire 22, Gloucestershire 5

22–25 July 2025
Scorecard

Middlesex	v	Northamptonshire
625/8d (146 overs); Max Holden 151 (282); Saif Zaib 3/70 (15 overs)		261 (81.3 overs); Saif Zaib 82 (159); Ryan Higgins 4/51 (16 overs)
		257 (90 overs) (f/o); Rob Keogh 61* (192); Ryan Higgins 3/54 (22 overs)

Middlesex won by an innings and 107 runs
Merchant Taylors' School Ground, Northwood
Umpires: Hassan Adnan and Anthony Harris

- Northamptonshire won the toss and elected to field.
- Points: Middlesex 24, Northamptonshire 2

29 July–1 August 2025
Scorecard

Middlesex	v	Gloucestershire
445 (108.5 overs); Kane Williamson 153 (183); Matthew Taylor 3/88 (24 overs)		404/9 (88.4 overs); Joe Phillips 136 (182); Noah Cornwell 2/55 (11.4 overs)

Match drawn
College Ground, Cheltenham
Umpires: Neil Pratt and Sue Redfern

- Middlesex won the toss and elected to bat.
- Only 52 overs of play was possible on day 1 due to rain.
- Joe Phillips (Gloucestershire) scored his maiden century in first-class cricket.
- Points: Middlesex 15, Gloucestershire 15

29 July–1 August 2025
Scorecard

Leicestershire	v	Kent
471 (114.5 overs); Rehan Ahmed 119 (156); Matt Parkinson 7/137 (34 overs)		445/8 (152 overs); Ben Compton 221 (380); Rehan Ahmed 3/134 (42 overs)

Match drawn
St Lawrence Ground, Canterbury
Umpires: Ben Debenham and Simon Widdup

- Kent won the toss and elected to field.
- Ben Dawkins (Kent) made his first-class debut.
- Points: Leicestershire 14, Kent 13

29 July–1 August 2025
Scorecard

Glamorgan	v	Lancashire
261 (97.2 overs); Kiran Carlson 77 (129); Chris Green 6/82 (34 overs)		137 (52.3 overs); Josh Bohannon 32 (72); Mason Crane 6/19 (10.3 overs)
348/7d (76 overs); Sam Northeast 132 (215); Chris Green 3/93 (18 overs)		318 (74.5 overs); Luke Wells 102 (117); Ben Kellaway 3/82 (25 overs)

Glamorgan won by 154 runs
Old Trafford, Manchester
Umpires: David Millns and Ben Peverall

- Glamorgan won the toss and elected to bat.
- Points: Glamorgan 20, Lancashire 3

29 July–1 August 2025
Scorecard

Derbyshire	v	Northamptonshire
377 (104.2 overs); Martin Andersson 105 (148); Yuzvendra Chahal 6/118 (33.2 overs)		550/9d (155.5 overs); Justin Broad 171 (273); Luis Reece 3/114 (32 overs)
185/5 (62 overs); Luis Reece 61* (152); Rob Keogh 2/37 (15 overs)

Match drawn
County Ground, Northampton
Umpires: Naeem Ashraf and Nigel Llong

- Derbyshire won the toss and elected to bat.
- Joe Hawkins (Derbyshire) made his first-class debut.
- Points: Derbyshire 13, Northamptonshire 13

=== September ===
8–11 September 2025
Scorecard

Kent	v	Lancashire
293 (86 overs); Ben Compton 77 (166); Mitchell Stanley 5/80 (16 overs)		284 (77.2 overs); Luke Wells 80 (127); Matt Quinn 4/43 (19 overs)
293 (77.3 overs); Jaydn Denly 74 (106); Mitchell Stanley 6/100 (16 overs)		138/3 (28 overs); Marcus Harris 50* (69); Matt Quinn 2/21 (7 overs)

Match drawn
St Lawrence Ground, Canterbury
Umpires: Anthony Harris and Surendiran Shanmugam

- Kent won the toss and elected to bat.
- Only overs 38.3 play was possible on day 3 due to rain.
- Mitchell Stanley (Lancashire) took his maiden five-wicket haul and maiden ten-wicket haul in first-class cricket.
- Points: Kent 12, Lancashire 12

8–11 September 2025
Scorecard

Gloucestershire	v	Leicestershire
482 (120.4 overs); Graeme van Buuren 101 (143); Chris Wright 3/60 (19 overs)		342 (93.4 overs); Shan Masood 111 (176); Matthew Taylor 5/70 (22 overs)
175/3d (27 overs); Joe Phillips 69* (73); Ian Holland 2/58 (9 overs)		93/1 (30.3 overs); Rishi Patel 42* (95); Ajeet Singh Dale 1/19 (7 overs)

Match drawn
Grace Road, Leicester
Umpires: Hassan Adnan and Paul Baldwin

- Gloucestershire won the toss and elected to bat.
- Only 30.5 overs play was possible on day 3 due to rain.
- Points: Gloucestershire 15, Leicestershire 12

8–11 September 2025
Scorecard

Derbyshire	v	Middlesex
283 (86.4 overs); Harry Came 64 (121); Toby Roland-Jones 6/77 (22.4 overs)		298 (91.1 overs); Leus du Plooy 105 (175); Ben Aitchison 3/35 (20.1 overs)
153/4 (62.3 overs); Brooke Guest 65* (129); Ryan Higgins 2/49 (20 overs)

Match drawn
Lord's, London
Umpires: Peter Hartley and James Tredwell

- Derbyshire won the toss and elected to bat.
- Only 10 overs play was possible on day 3 due to rain.
- Sebastian Morgan (Middlesex) and Rory Haydon (Derbyshire) both made their first-class debuts.
- Points: Derbyshire 12, Middlesex 12

8–11 September 2025
Scorecard

Glamorgan	v	Northamptonshire
467 (121.4 overs); Asa Tribe 206 (297); Nirvan Ramesh 3/42 (14.4 overs)		413/9d (92.4 overs); Saif Zaib 145 (186); Mason Crane 5/126 (23 overs)
241/7d (80 overs); Colin Ingram 55 (85); Calvin Harrison 3/46 (23 overs)

Match drawn
County Ground, Northampton
Umpires: Neil Pratt and Chris Watts

- Glamorgan won the toss and elected to bat.
- Only 25.3 overs play was possible on day 3 due to rain.
- Nirvan Ramesh and Benjamin Whitehouse (Northamptonshire) both made their first-class debuts.
- Asa Tribe (Glamorgan) scored his maiden double century in first-class cricket.
- Points: Glamorgan 15, Northamptonshire 14

15–18 September 2025
Scorecard

Glamorgan	v	Derbyshire
259 (88.3 overs); Kiran Carlson 94 (178); Luis Reece 4/67 (22.3 overs)		17/0 (5 overs); Aneurin Donald 10* (16)

Match drawn
County Ground, Derby
Umpires: Steve O'Shaughnessy and Surendiran Shanmugam

- Derbyshire won the toss and elected to field.
- No play was possible on day 1, 3 and 4 due to rain.
- Amrit Basra (Derbyshire) made his first-class debut.
- Points: Glamorgan 9, Derbyshire 11

15–18 September 2025
Scorecard

Northamptonshire	v	Gloucestershire
206 (63.5 overs); Saif Zaib 76 (112); Graeme van Buuren 3/23 (10 overs)		241 (64 overs); Jack Taylor 63 (64); Justin Broad 3/84 (19 overs)
192 (50.2 overs); Justin Broad 49 (104); Ajeet Singh Dale 4/46 (14.2 overs)		158/3 (24 overs); Ollie Price 54 (58); Justin Broad 1/21 (4 overs)

Gloucestershire won by 7 wickets
County Ground, Bristol
Umpires: Paul Baldwin and James Tredwell

- Gloucestershire won the toss and elected to field.
- No play was possible on day 1 due to rain.
- Points: Gloucestershire 17, Northamptonshire 3

15–18 September 2025
Scorecard

Middlesex	v	Lancashire
211 (50.4 overs); Josh de Caires 52 (68); Tom Aspinwall 4/62 (15.4 overs)		375/5d (69 overs); Josh Bohannon 87 (69); Toby Roland-Jones 2/49 (14 overs)
99/4 (38.5 overs); Luke Hollman 33 (92); Tom Bailey 3/47 (17.5 overs)

Match drawn
Old Trafford, Manchester
Umpires: Richard Illingworth and Chris Watts

- Lancashire won the toss and elected to field.
- No play was possible on day 1 due to rain.
- Arav Shetty (Lancashire) made his first-class debut.
- Points: Lancashire 14, Middlesex 9

15–18 September 2025
Scorecard

Leicestershire	v	Kent
459/7d (84.1 overs); Rishi Patel 114 (143); Joey Evison 3/67 (16.1 overs)		17/0 (9.1 overs); Harry Finch 9* (24)

Match drawn
Grace Road, Leicester
Umpires: Hassan Adnan and Simon Widdup

- Kent won the toss and elected to field.
- No play was possible on day 1, 3 and 4 due to rain.
- Oliver Curtiss and Corey Flintoff (Kent) both made their first-class debuts.
- Points: Leicestershire 13, Kent 4

24–27 September 2025
Scorecard

Glamorgan	v	Lancashire
265 (73.2 overs); Timm van der Gugten 53 (122); Tom Bailey 5/51 (19.2 overs)		374 (96.4 overs); Luke Wells 78 (157); Timm van der Gugten 5/85 (23.4 overs)
241 (85 overs); Chris Cooke 52 (105); George Balderson 4/75 (25 overs)		134/3 (20 overs); Keaton Jennings 47 (33); Mason Crane 2/26 (5 overs)

Lancashire won by 7 wickets
Sophia Gardens, Cardiff
Umpires: Peter Hartley and Tom Lungley

- Lancashire won the toss and elected to field.
- Points: Lancashire 22, Glamorgan 4

24–27 September 2025
Scorecard

Derbyshire	v	Kent
698/6d (145 overs); Luis Reece 211 (342); Matt Parkinson 3/188 (38 overs)		271 (85.4 overs); Ben Dawkins 61 (132); Jack Morley 5/99 (23 overs)
		198 (61.5 overs) (f/o); Ben Compton 65 (120); Luis Reece 5/63 (21.5 overs)

Derbyshire won by an innings and 229 runs
St Lawrence Ground, Canterbury
Umpires: Hassan Adnan and Mark Newell

- Derbyshire won the toss and elected to bat.
- Points: Derbyshire 24, Kent 1

24–27 September 2025
Scorecard

Middlesex	v	Gloucestershire
634/9d (147.4 overs); Leus du Plooy 263* (358); Ajeet Singh Dale 5/108 (25 overs)		286 (88.1 overs); Ben Charlesworth 63 (80); Zafar Gohar 5/53 (23 overs)
		281 (90 overs) (f/o); Ollie Price 61 (112); Toby Roland-Jones 4/57 (26 overs)

Middlesex won by an innings and 67 runs
Lord's, London
Umpires: Ian Blackwell and Neil Pratt

- Middlesex won the toss and elected to bat.
- Daz Ahmed (Gloucestershire) made his first-class debut.
- Points: Middlesex 23, Gloucestershire 3

24–27 September 2025
Scorecard

Leicestershire	v	Northamptonshire
429 (107.5 overs); Stephen Eskinazi 155 (240); Justin Broad 3/83 (22 overs)		189 (57.2 overs); Saif Zaib 62 (75); Chris Wright 3/19 (11 overs)
260/5d (63 overs); Rishi Patel 76 (152); Rob Keogh 2/20 (6 overs)		333 (105.5 overs); Stuart van der Merwe 116 (209); Liam Trevaskis 6/85 (28.5 overs)

Leicestershire won by 167 runs
County Ground, Northampton
Umpires: Neil Mallender and Rob Bailey

- Leicestershire won the toss and elected to bat.
- Arush Buchake and Stuart van der Merwe (Northamptonshire) both made their first-class debuts.
- Stuart van der Merwe (Northamptonshire) scored his maiden century in first-class cricket.
- Points: Leicestershire 23, Northamptonshire 3

== Standings ==
=== Division One ===
Pos	Team	Pld	W	L	T	D	A	Bat	Bowl	Ded	Pts	
1	Nottinghamshire	14	7	1	0	6	0	32	34	2	224	Champions
2	Surrey	14	5	1	0	8	0	30	34	0	208	
3	Somerset	14	4	3	0	7	0	29	37	5	181	
4	Sussex	14	4	4	0	6	0	20	40	0	172	
5	Warwickshire	14	3	2	0	9	0	21	31	0	172	
6	Essex	14	3	3	0	8	0	27	33	0	172	
7	Yorkshire	14	4	4	0	6	0	21	36	1	168	
8	Hampshire	14	2	3	0	9	0	12	37	8	145	
9	Durham	14	2	6	0	6	0	30	34	0	144	Relegation to Division 2
10	Worcestershire	14	1	8	0	5	0	12	39	4	103	Relegation to Division 2

Source: ECB, Cricbuzz

=== Division Two ===
Pos	Team	Pld	W	L	T	D	A	Bat	Bowl	Ded	Pts	
1	Leicestershire	14	7	1	0	6	0	46	35	0	241	Promotion to Division 1
2	Glamorgan	14	5	3	0	6	0	32	34	1	193	Promotion to Division 1
3	Derbyshire	14	3	2	0	9	0	32	36	0	188	
4	Middlesex	14	5	4	0	5	0	26	36	0	182	
5	Lancashire	14	3	3	0	8	0	26	37	0	175	
6	Gloucestershire	14	2	4	0	8	0	35	37	2	166	
7	Northamptonshire	14	2	6	0	6	0	27	36	0	143	
8	Kent	14	2	6	0	6	0	18	30	14	114	

Source: ECB, Cricbuzz

== Statistics ==
=== Division One ===
Most runs
Runs	Player	Team
1,274	Dom Sibley	Surrey
1,258	Haseeb Hameed	Nottinghamshire
1,173	Adam Lyth	Yorkshire
1,086	John Simpson	Sussex
1,060	Jake Libby	Worcestershire

Most wickets
Wickets	Player	Team
58	Tom Taylor	Worcestershire
56	Kyle Abbott	Hampshire
52	Jack Leach	Somerset
51	George Hill	Yorkshire
49	Jamie Porter	Essex

=== Division Two ===
Most runs
Runs	Player	Team
1,425	Saif Zaib	Northamptonshire
1,386	Ben Compton	Kent
1,158	Wayne Madsen	Derbyshire
1,076	Colin Ingram	Glamorgan
1,074	Luke Wells	Lancashire

Most wickets
Wickets	Player	Team
50	Luis Reece	Derbyshire
45	Toby Roland-Jones	Middlesex
42	Ryan Higgins	Middlesex
40	Ajeet Singh Dale	Gloucestershire
40	George Balderson	Lancashire
