= Luis Reece =

English cricketer

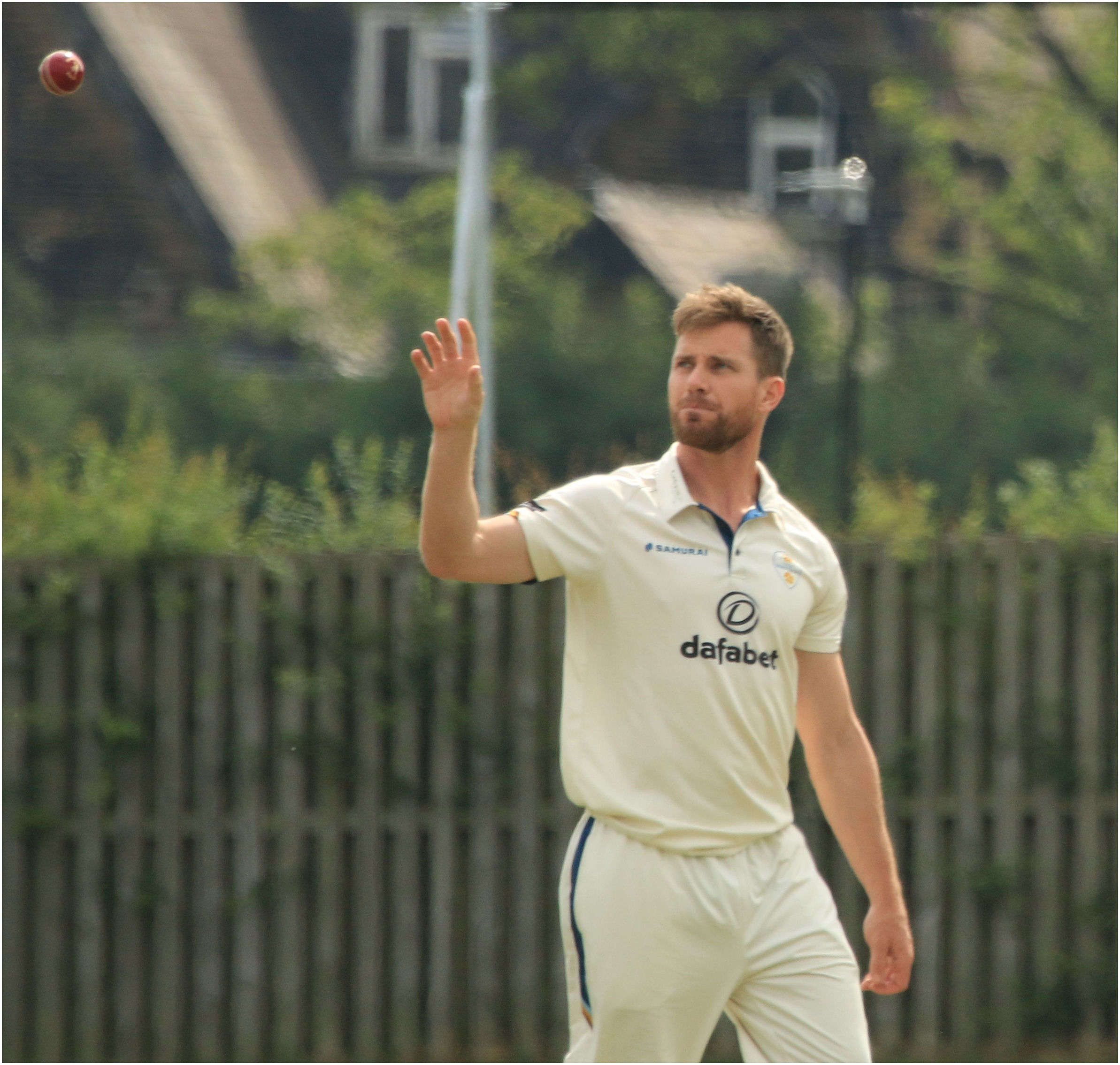
- Reece in 2025

Personal information
- Full name: Luis Michael Reece
- Born: 4 August 1990 (age 36); Taunton, Somerset, England
- Batting: Left-handed
- Bowling: Left-arm medium
- Role: All-rounder

Domestic team information
- Years: Team
- 2011–2012: Unicorns
- 2012–2013: Leeds/Bradford MCCU
- 2013–2016: Lancashire
- 2017–present: Derbyshire (squad no. 10)
- 2017: Chittagong Vikings
- 2019–20: Dhaka Platoon
- FC debut: 31 March 2012 Leeds/Bradford MCCU v Surrey
- LA debut: 24 April 2011 Unicorns v Lancashire

Career statistics
Competition	FC	LA	T20
Matches	134	66	101
Runs scored	7,636	1,968	2,040
Batting average	36.53	35.78	21.93
100s/50s	15/42	3/12	0/16
Top score	211	136	97*
Balls bowled	11,265	1,657	733
Wickets	219	40	33
Bowling average	27.75	40.77	32.33
5 wickets in innings	8	0	0
10 wickets in match	2	0	0
Best bowling	7/20	4/35	3/33
Catches/stumpings	54/–	19/–	43/–
- Source: ESPNcricinfo, 27 September 2026

Luis Michael Reece (born 4 August 1990) is an English cricketer who plays for Derbyshire. He is a left-handed batsman who bowls left-arm medium pace. He previously played for Lancashire before joining Derbyshire ahead of the 2017 season.

== Early life ==
Luis Reece was born in Taunton, Somerset and educated at St. Michael's CE High School and Myerscough College, both in Lancashire.

== Career ==
Reece played for the Lancashire Second XI in 2008–2009. He played non-first-class cricket for Leeds/Bradford UCCE in 2011. He then made his List A debut for the Unicorns in the 2011 Clydesdale Bank 40 against Lancashire, and made eight further List A appearances for the Unicorns in the 2011 season, taking a total of 5 wickets at an average of 34.40, with best figures of 4/35. He also scored a total of 115 runs in these matches, which came at a batting average of 23.00, with a high score of 26. In 2012 he played 11 games for the Unicorns, scoring 233 runs at 25.88 but taking only one wicket.

When Leeds/Bradford MCCU played their first first-class matches in 2012 he scored 134 runs at 33.50 and took 5 wickets at 24.00. He captained the team in 2013, scoring 155 runs at 51.66 and taking 7 wickets at 24.14. In the match against Leicestershire, which Leeds/Bradford MCCU won by 102 runs, he scored 114 not out.

He made his County Championship debut for Lancashire against Essex in June 2013, playing as an opening batsman. In ten matches he made 722 runs at 55.53 with eight fifties.

Derbyshire signed Reece from Lancashire on a two-year contract in October 2016. In June 2017, he was hospitalised after suffering breathing difficulties during a Championship match against Northamptonshire. After scoring 1180 runs in all formats during his first season with Derbyshire, Reece signed a new three-year contract with the county.

Reece was selected to play for Chittagong Vikings in the 2017–18 Bangladesh Premier League.

After the 2018 season which was much taken up by a foot injury that kept Reece out for over three months, he signed a further one-year deal to keep him at Derbyshire until at least 2021. His credentials were enhanced by the surprising bowling of 7–20 in an end-of-season championship match against Gloucestershire, giving rise to hopes that he can be considered a genuine all-rounder. In October 2019, Reece signed a new contract with Derbyshire until the end of the 2023 season. The following month, he was selected to play for the Dhaka Platoon in the 2019–20 Bangladesh Premier League.

Reece took 10 wickets in a match for the first time when he recorded figures of 6/52 and 4/45 as Derbyshire defeated Gloucestershire in the opening round of the 2025 County Championship. He set new career-best bowling figures in July 2025, with a match-haul of 11/120 against Leicestershire and later that month signed a contract extension to keep him at Derbyshire until at least the end of the 2027 season.
