= Arafat Bhuiyan =

Bangladeshi cricketer

Personal information
- Born: 11 October 1996; Dhaka, Bangladesh
- Batting: Right-handed
- Bowling: Right-arm fast-medium
- Role: Bowler

Domestic team information
- Years: Team
- 2023–2024: Kent (squad no. 26)
- 2025: Suffolk
- FC debut: 18 May 2023 Kent v Surrey

Career statistics
Competition	First-class
Matches	5
Runs scored	45
Batting average	11.25
100s/50s	0/0
Top score	22*
Balls bowled	651
Wickets	9
Bowling average	50.55
5 wickets in innings	0
10 wickets in match	0
Best bowling	4/65
Catches/stumpings	1/–
- Source: Cricinfo, 1 June 2024

Arafat Bhuiyan (born 11 October 1996) is a Bangladeshi-born cricketer who currently plays for Warwickshire County Cricket Club as a bowler. Born in Dhaka on 11 October 1996, he moved to England when he was 14 and signed professional terms with Kent County Cricket Club in 2023 after graduating from the South Asian Cricket Academy (SACA).

== Career ==
Arafat Bhuiyan was born at Dhaka in Bangladesh in 1996, but moved to England when he was 14 to play cricket. Starting in 2017, he played for the Second XIs of Surrey, Essex and Derbyshire County Cricket Clubs as well as for Kent. He also played for the Marylebone Cricket Club's Young Cricketers. In the winter of 2022, he enrolled in the South Asian Cricket Academy (SACA) in Birmingham.

For the 2023 season, he was playing club cricket for Blackheath Cricket Club in the Kent Cricket League but also playing for Kent's 2nd XI. On 17 May 2023, he signed his first professional contract with Kent for the rest of the 2023 season. He made his County Championship debut against Surrey at The Oval the next day. On day two of the match, he took the wickets of Ollie Pope, Jamie Smith, Ben Foakes and Will Jacks with bowling figures of 4/65 in his first innings.

Arafat is eligible to play for the Bangladesh national cricket team but also qualifies for the England cricket team through residency and as a British passport holder.

Arafat left Kent at the end of his contract in October 2024. He joined Warwickshire for the 2025 English cricket season, playing for their Second XI.
