= South Asian Cricket Academy =

British cricket development programme

- Abbreviation: SACA
- Formation: 2022
- Founders: Tom Brown; Kabir Ali
- Type: Cricket development programme
- Purpose: Increasing professional opportunities for British South Asian cricketers
- Website: saca-uk.com

South Asian Cricket Academy (SACA) is a British cricket development programme created to improve routes into the professional game for British South Asian cricketers. It was founded by Dr. Tom Brown and former England fast bowler Kabir Ali after Brown's doctoral research examined the underrepresentation of British South Asian players in professional cricket.

== Background ==
Brown's research found that British South Asian cricketers made up about 30 per cent of recreational cricket and 20 percent of the elite pathway in England and Wales, but less than 5 percent of male professionals. According to another study published in 2024, it was reported that white privately educated British male cricketers were 34 times more likely to become professionals than state educated British South Asians. SACA was established as a short term intervention programme, giving players aged 18 and over winter training and summer fixtures against county second XIs in an effort to secure trials and professional contracts.

In 2024, funding from the England and Wales Cricket Board helped expand the academy's fixture list. By September 2024, it was operating regional hubs in Birmingham, Bristol and Bradford and working with about 65 players. In January 2026, SACA launched its first women's programme.

== Graduates ==
- Jafer Chohan
- Andrew Umeed
- Zaman Akhter
- Zen Malik
- Kashif Ali
- Zain-ul-Hassan
- Arafat Bhuiyan
- Yadvinder Singh
- Hassan Azad
