= Zaman Akhter =

English cricketer (born 1999)

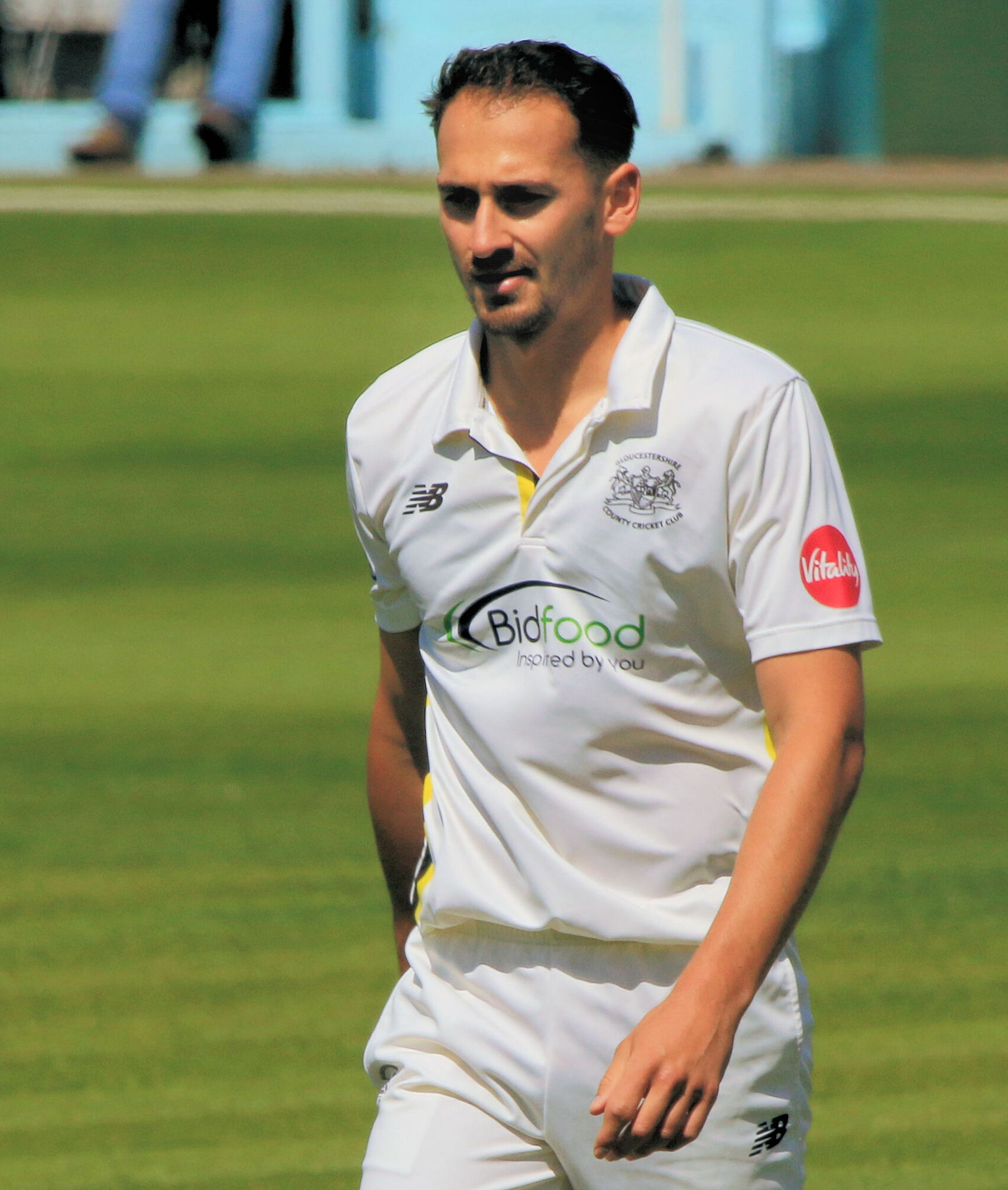
- Akhter in 2024

Personal information
- Born: 12 March 1999 (age 27); Cambridge, Cambridgeshire, England
- Batting: Right-handed
- Bowling: Right arm medium

Domestic team information
- Years: Team
- 2023–2025: Gloucestershire (squad no. 17)
- 2026–: Essex (squad no. 5)
- First-class debut: 20 May 2023 Gloucestershire v Durham
- List A debut: 1 August 2023 Gloucestershire v Derbyshire

Career statistics
Competition	FC	LA	T20
Matches	37	17	15
Runs scored	913	76	82
Batting average	21.73	8.44	16.40
100s/50s	0/3	0/0	0/0
Top score	70	27*	26*
Balls bowled	5,114	799	258
Wickets	90	21	15
Bowling average	38.36	38.28	28.13
5 wickets in innings	4	0	0
10 wickets in match	0	0	0
Best bowling	5/32	4/47	3/19
Catches/stumpings	10/–	11/–	5/–
- Source: ESPNcricinfo, 27 September 2026

Zaman Akhter (born 12 March 1999) is an English cricketer who plays for Essex County Cricket Club and was the 6th graduate of the South Asian Cricket Academy (SACA) to sign a professional contract. He is a right-handed batsman and right arm medium pace bowler. He made his first-class debut for Gloucestershire on 18 May 2023, against Durham. Akhter has also played for England Lions.

== Career ==
Akhter made his first-class cricket debut for the Oxford UCCE scheme (Oxford Brookes University and University of Oxford) against Middlesex in March 2019. He later played minor counties cricket for Cambridge, and Hertfordshire. He played for Essex Second-XI towards the end of the 2022 season.

=== Gloucestershire ===
Akhter played at South Asia Cricket Academy prior to signing for Gloucestershire in March 2023. Gloucestershire coach Dale Benkenstein described him as having a “natural action”. He made his first-class debut for Gloucestershire on 18 May 2023 against Durham. In his third first-class match, on 13 June 2023, he impressed by taking 4-33 from 17 overs against Leicestershire. He signed a new one-year contract with the club in November 2023.

He took his first five-wicket haul for Gloucestershire on the opening day of the 2024 County Championship, finishing with figures of 5/89 against Yorkshire at Bristol on 12 April 2024. In August 2024, he signed a contract extension with the county.

=== Essex ===
Akhter played for Essex from the 2026 season after signing a three year deal with the county in August 2025.

=== England Lions ===
Akhter was named in the England Lions squad for a four-day match against Sri Lanka at New Road, Worcester in August 2024. He took five wickets for 32 runs off 11.5 overs in the tourists' first innings. In December 2024, he played for the England Lions against South Africa A on their tour of South Africa.
