= Zen Malik =

English cricketer (born 1998)

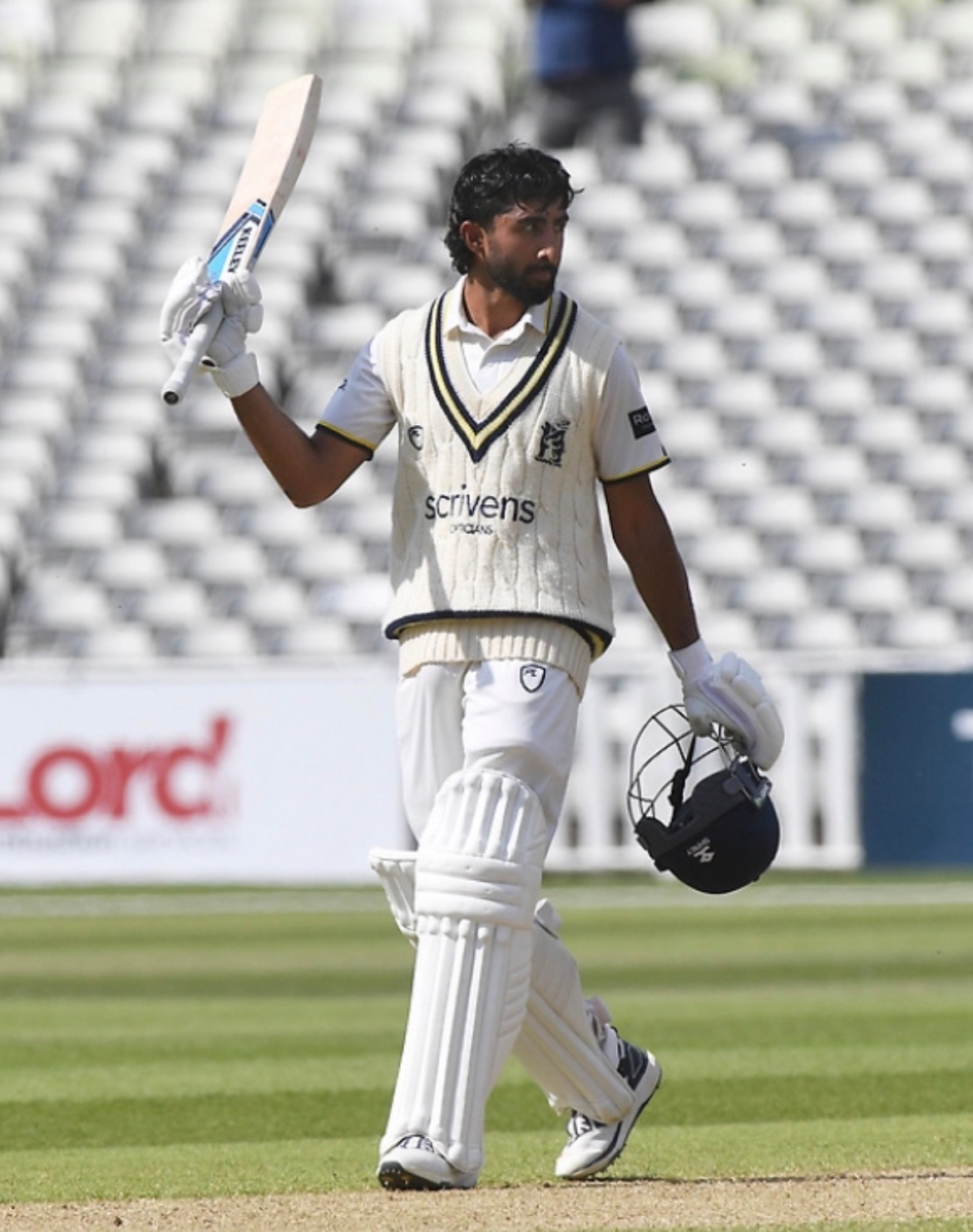

Personal information
- Full name: Zen Ul Abideen Malik
- Born: 9 April 1998 (age 28); Stoke-on-Trent, Staffordshire, England
- Batting: Right-handed
- Bowling: Right arm leg break

Domestic team information
- Years: Team
- 2024–present: Warwickshire (squad no. 8)
- FC debut: 2 May 2025 Warwickshire v Yorkshire
- LA debut: 14 August 2024 Warwickshire v Nottinghamshire

Career statistics
Competition	FC	LA	T20
Matches	18	17	9
Runs scored	736	378	216
Batting average	28.30	22.23	24.00
100s/50s	2/2	0/2	0/1
Top score	142	72	99
Balls bowled	66	–	–
Wickets	1	–	–
Bowling average	61.00	–	–
5 wickets in innings	0	–	–
10 wickets in match	0	–	–
Best bowling	1/7	–	–
Catches/stumpings	10/–	8/–	2/–
- Source: Cricinfo, 26 September 2026

Zen Ul Abideen Malik (born 9 April 1998) is an English cricketer who plays for Warwickshire. He attended Malvern College. He is a right-handed batsman and right arm leg spin bowler.

== Career ==
In August 2024, he signed a two-year professional contract with the Warwickshire. Upon signing for Warwickshire midway through the 2024 season he became the 10th graduate of the South Asian Cricket Academy (SACA) to sign a deal with a professional county. He made his first-class debut against Yorkshire on 2 May 2025. He also played for Staffordshire County Cricket Club. He scored his maiden century in first-class cricket against Surrey on 10 May 2025. He made his List A debut for Warwickshire against Nottinghamshire on 15 August 2024.
