= Farhan Ahmed (English cricketer) =

English cricketer (born 2008)

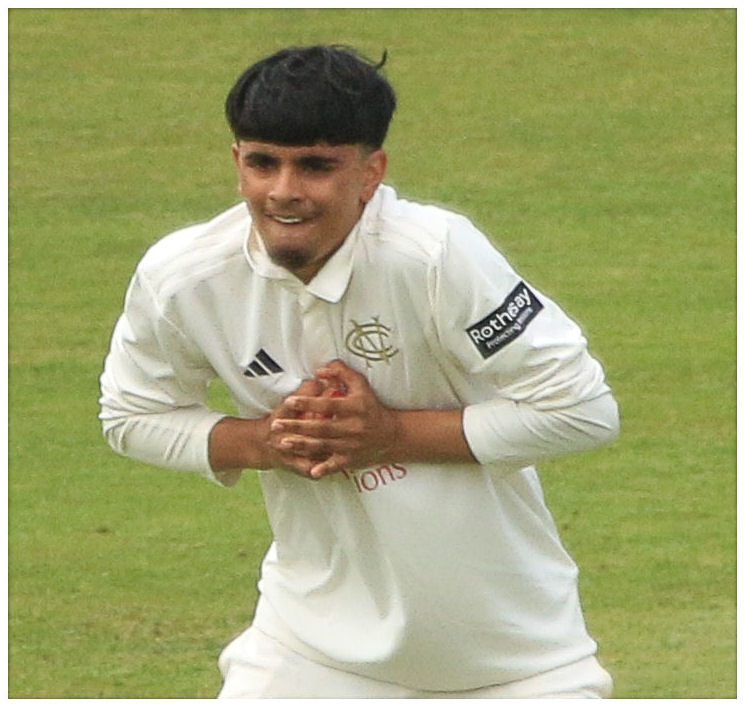
- Ahmed in 2025

Personal information
- Born: 22 February 2008 (age 18); Nottingham, England
- Batting: Right-handed
- Bowling: Right arm off break
- Relatives: Rehan Ahmed (brother)

Domestic team information
- Years: Team
- 2024–2026: Nottinghamshire (squad no. 97)
- 2025: Manchester Originals (squad no. 7)
- FC debut: 14 August 2024 England Lions v Sri Lanka
- LA debut: 24 July 2024 Nottinghamshire v Leicestershire

Career statistics
Competition	FC	LA	T20
Matches	14	11	9
Runs scored	141	56	15
Batting average	9.40	11.20	15.00
100s/50s	0/0	0/0	0/0
Top score	31	21	7
Balls bowled	2,735	600	148
Wickets	39	10	8
Bowling average	34.82	55.60	26.25
5 wickets in innings	1	0	1
10 wickets in match	1	0	0
Best bowling	7/140	3/26	5/25
Catches/stumpings	8/–	5/–	1/–
Medal record
Men's cricket
Representing England
ICC U19 World Cup
Runner-up	2026 Zimbabwe & Namibia
- Source: Cricinfo, 18 August 2026

Farhan Ahmed (born 22 February 2008) is an English cricketer who plays for Nottinghamshire County Cricket Club, the England national under-19 cricket team and England Lions. He is a right-handed batsman and right-arm offbreak bowler.

== Domestic career ==
An off-spinner, Ahmed played club cricket alongside his brothers Raheem and Rehan for Cavaliers and Carrington CC. All bowlers, on one occasion they took all ten wickets in an innings among them. He made his debut for Nottinghamshire's second XI against Lancashire in May 2022, three months after his 14th birthday, and established himself in the side the following season. In June 2024, he signed a three-and-a-half-year professional contract with the county.

He made his List A debut for Nottinghamshire against Leicestershire in the 2024 One-Day Cup at Grace Road on 24 July 2024. Aged 16 years 153 days, Ahmed became the second youngest player to appear in senior cricket for Nottinghamshire, behind Paul Johnson, who was 32 days younger when he debuted in 1981.

On 29 August 2024, Ahmed became the youngest-ever player to appear for Nottinghamshire in a County Championship match. On the second day of that match against Surrey, he became the youngest-ever player to take five wickets in an County Championship innings, and the following day he became the youngest-ever player to take ten wickets in a first-class match in England, beating the record of W. G. Grace which had stood since 1865.

Along with Freddie McCann, he was named joint Nottinghamshire emerging player of the year for the 2024 season.

In the 2025 T20 Blast against Lancashire in July 2025, he became the second-youngest man to take a T20 hat trick, aged 17 years and 147 days. The following month, he was signed by Manchester Originals ahead of the 2025 The Hundred season.

== International career ==
Ahmed made his debut for the England U19 as a 15-year-old in the summer of 2023. He was subsequently selected for the 2024 Under-19 Cricket World Cup. He retained his place in the England U19 team for their summer 2024 series against Sri Lanka U19. In the second four-day match between the two sides, Ahmed took 4/59 off 26.5 overs in Sri Lanka's second innings as England won to clinch the series 1–0, the first game having been a rain-affected draw. He was named in the England Lions squad for a four-day match against Sri Lanka in August 2024. Ahmed was included in the XI for the match thus making his First-class debut, going on to take 3/87 in the tourists' second innings.

He was named in the England Lions squad for their tour of South Africa in November and December 2024. Ahmed returned to South Africa in January 2025 as part of the England Under-19 squad.

In May 2025, Ahmed was named in the England Lions squad for a two-match series against India A.

Ahmed was named captain of the England Under-19 squad for their tour to the Caribbean in November 2025. The following month, he was named in the England squad for the 2026 Under-19 Men's Cricket World Cup.

== Personal life ==
His father Naeem Ahmed, a former cricketer, was born in Mirpur, where he played as a fast-bowling all-rounder, before moving to England with his wife Musrat Hussain, in 2001. He is the younger brother of England international cricketer Rehan Ahmed and fellow cricketer Raheem Ahmed.
