= Rehan Ahmed =

English cricketer (born 2004)

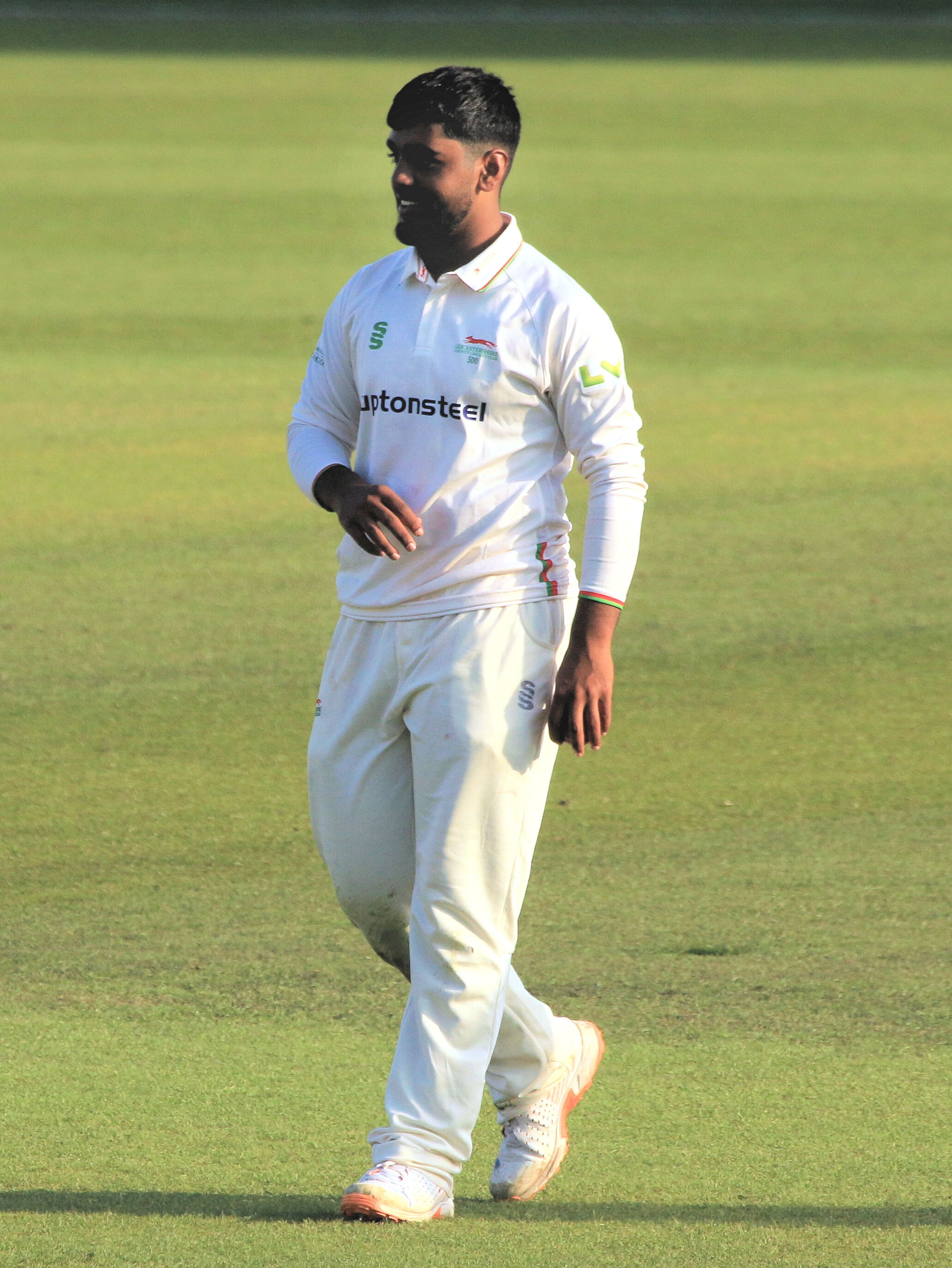
- Ahmed in 2023

Personal information
- Full name: Rehan Ahmed
- Born: 13 August 2004 (age 22); Nottingham, Nottinghamshire, England
- Batting: Right-handed
- Bowling: Right-arm leg break
- Role: Bowling all-rounder
- Relatives: Farhan Ahmed (brother); Raheem Ahmed (brother)

International information
- National side: England (2022–present)
- Test debut (cap 710): 17 December 2022 v Pakistan
- Last Test: 24 October 2024 v Pakistan
- ODI debut (cap 270): 6 March 2023 v Bangladesh
- Last ODI: 24 September 2026 v Sri Lanka
- ODI shirt no.: 53
- T20I debut (cap 99): 12 March 2023 v Bangladesh
- Last T20I: 9 July 2026 v India
- T20I shirt no.: 53

Domestic team information
- Years: Team
- 2021–present: Leicestershire (squad no. 16)
- 2022–2024: Southern Brave (squad no. 10)
- 2025: Gulf Giants (squad no. 10)
- 2025: Trent Rockets (squad no. 10)
- 2025/26: Hobart Hurricanes (squad no. 74)
- 2026: Birmingham Phoenix (squad no. 53)

Career statistics
Competition	Test	ODI	T20I	FC
Matches	5	11	14	46
Runs scored	103	101	74	2,445
Batting average	10.30	11.22	14.80	32.60
100s/50s	0/0	0/0	0/0	7/11
Top score	28	27	19*	136
Balls bowled	1,038	486	228	5,737
Wickets	22	15	15	98
Bowling average	31.22	29.66	24.06	37.72
5 wickets in innings	1	0	0	4
10 wickets in match	0	0	0	1
Best bowling	5/48	4/54	3/39	7/93
Catches/stumpings	3/–	2/–	3/–	12/–
- Source: Cricinfo, 25 September 2026

Rehan Ahmed (born 13 August 2004) is an English cricketer. He made his international debut against Pakistan on 17 December 2022, becoming England's youngest Test debutant at the age of 18 years and 126 days. On the third day of the match he also became the youngest debutant to take five wickets in an innings in men’s Tests. On 12 March 2023, Ahmed became the youngest England male cricketer to play in all three formats of international cricket.

== Early life and career ==
His father Naeem Ahmed, a former cricketer, was born in Pakistan, where he played as a fast-bowling all-rounder, before moving to England. Naeem, originally from Mirpur in Azad Kashmir, migrated to England with his wife in 2001, where he began to work as a taxi driver. Rehan can speak Pothwari, the dialect of Punjabi dominant in Mirpur, and also understands Urdu. His brothers Farhan and Raheem are also cricketers.

Ahmed was in the youth set up at Nottinghamshire but left to join Leicestershire in 2017. Aged 13, he was already billed as one of the brightest prospects in English cricket, having been invited to bowl at England and West Indies at Lord's and clean bowled Ben Stokes.

== Domestic career ==
He made his List A debut on 25 July 2021, for Leicestershire in the 2021 Royal London One-Day Cup. Prior to his List A debut, Ahmed was named in the County Select XI squad to play against India during their tour of England.

Ahmed was part of England's squad for the 2022 ICC Under-19 Cricket World Cup in the West Indies in early 2022. He played in four of his team's six matches, taking 12 wickets, as England finished as runners-up to India.

In April 2022, he was bought by the Southern Brave for the 2022 season of The Hundred. Later the same month, he signed a contract extension to the end of 2026 with Leicestershire.

Ahmed made his first-class debut on 19 May 2022, for Leicestershire in the 2022 County Championship, and his Twenty20 debut for the same team a week later.

He was named 2025 Professional Cricketers' Association Men's Young Player of the Year.

== International career ==
In November 2022, he was added to the England squad for the away Test series against Pakistan. He made his Test debut in the third Test of the series, on 17 December 2022. He became the youngest male cricketer for England to make his debut in Tests, achieving the milestone at the age of 18 years and 126 days. During Pakistan's second innings, Ahmed took his first five–wicket haul in Tests, and became the youngest debutant to achieve a five-wicket haul in men’s Tests.

In December 2022, he was shortlisted for that year's BBC Young Sports Personality of the Year Award.

In February 2023, he was named in England's One Day International (ODI) and Twenty20 International (T20I) squad for the series against Bangladesh. He made his ODI debut in the third ODI of the series, on 6 March 2023. He became the youngest male cricketer for England to make his debut in ODIs, achieving the milestone at the age 18 years and 205 days. He made his T20I debut in the second T20I of the series, on 12 March 2023. He became the youngest male cricketer for England to make his debut in T20Is, achieving the milestone at the age 18 years and 211 days.

In 2024, he played his first Test series against India, taking 11 wickets and scoring 76 runs in three Test matches.

On 27 Feb 2026, Rehan made his T20 World Cup debut in a critical Super 8 match against New Zealand, where he produced a match-winning all-round performance. With the ball, he claimed 2/28 from his 3 overs. During the run-chase, Rehan struck an unbeaten 19* off just 7 deliveries to help England top their Super 8 group.

== Bowling style ==
Ahmed plays principally as a right-arm bowler of leg spin, including googlies, and his accuracy has been praised.
