= 2010 County Championship =

English cricket tournament

- Dates: 9 April – 16 September 2010
- Administrator: England and Wales Cricket Board
- Cricket format: First-class cricket (4 days)
- Tournament format: League system
- Champions: Nottinghamshire (6th title)
- Participants: 18
- Matches: 144
- Most runs: Mark Ramprakash (1,595 for Surrey)
- Most wickets: Andre Adams (68 for Nottinghamshire)

The 2010 County Championship season, known as the LV County Championship for sponsorship reasons, was the 111th County Championship season. It was contested through two divisions: Division One and Division Two. Each team played all the others in their division both home and away. The top two teams from Division Two were promoted to the first division for the 2011 season, while the bottom two sides from Division One were relegated.

Nottinghamshire County Cricket Club won the Championship for the sixth time in their history, the first time since 2005. Essex and Kent were relegated from Division One, having been promoted only the season previous, and the two teams relegated to Division Two at the end of 2009, Sussex and Worcestershire, were promoted back into Division One at the first time of asking.

== Teams ==
Division One	Division Two
Durham	Derbyshire
Essex	Glamorgan
Hampshire	Gloucestershire
Kent	Leicestershire
Lancashire	Middlesex
Nottinghamshire	Northamptonshire
Somerset	Surrey
Warwickshire	Sussex
Yorkshire	Worcestershire

Icon
Team promoted from Division Two
Team relegated from Division One

== Standings ==
- Pos = Position, Pld = Played, W = Wins, L = Losses, D = Draws, T = Ties, A = Abandonments, Bat = Batting points, Bowl = Bowling points, Ded = Deducted points, Pts = Points.
- Points awarded: W = 16, L = 0, D = 3, A = 3

=== Division One ===
	Team	P	W	L	D	Bat	Bwl	Ded	Pts
1	Nottinghamshire (C)	16	7	5	4	47	43	0	214
2	Somerset	16	6	2	8	53	41	0	214
3	Yorkshire	16	6	2	8	41	42	0	203
4	Lancashire	16	5	3	8	35	43	0	182
5	Durham	16	5	3	8	30	39	0	173
6	Warwickshire	16	6	9	1	20	47	0	166
7	Hampshire	16	3	6	7	47	41	0	157
8	Kent (R)	16	3	7	6	42	44	1	151
9	Essex (R)	16	2	6	8	29	43	2	126
	Source:. Last updated 16 September 2010.								

=== Division Two ===
	Team	P	W	L	D	Bat	Bwl	Ded	Pts
1	Sussex (C)	16	8	3	5	45	47	0	235
2	Worcestershire (P)	16	7	4	5	39	42	0	208
3	Glamorgan	16	7	4	5	33	43	0	203
4	Leicestershire	16	7	5	4	31	44	0	199
5	Gloucestershire	16	6	9	1	28	47	2	172
6	Northamptonshire	16	6	7	3	28	34	0	167
7	Surrey	16	4	6	6	43	36	2	159
8	Middlesex	16	4	7	5	37	41	2	155
9	Derbyshire	16	3	7	6	30	42	0	138
	Source:. Last updated 16 September 2010.								

== Results ==
=== Division One ===
	Durham	Essex	Hampshire	Kent	Lancashire	Nottinghamshire	Somerset	Warwickshire	Yorkshire
Durham		Match drawn	Durham	Kent	Match drawn	Durham	Match drawn	Durham	Yorkshire
Essex	Match drawn		Essex	Match drawn	Lancashire	Essex	Somerset	Warwickshire	Match drawn
Hampshire	Match drawn	Match drawn		Hampshire	Match drawn	Nottinghamshire	Match drawn	Warwickshire	Match drawn
Kent	Durham	Kent	Hampshire		Lancashire	Match drawn	Match drawn	Warwickshire	Match drawn
Lancashire	Durham	Match drawn	Lancashire	Match drawn		Match drawn	Match drawn	Lancashire	Match drawn
Nottinghamshire	Nottinghamshire	Match drawn	Hampshire	Nottinghamshire	Nottinghamshire		Nottinghamshire	Nottinghamshire	Yorkshire
Somerset	Match drawn	Match drawn	Match drawn	Match drawn	Somerset	Somerset		Somerset	Somerset
Warwickshire	Match drawn	Warwickshire	Warwickshire	Warwickshire	Lancashire	Nottinghamshire	Somerset		Yorkshire
Yorkshire	Match drawn	Yorkshire	Match drawn	Kent	Match drawn	Match drawn	Yorkshire	Yorkshire	

Source: Last updated : 16 September 2010

=== Division Two ===
	Derbyshire	Glamorgan	Gloucestershire	Leicestershire	Middlesex	Northamptonshire	Surrey	Sussex	Worcestershire
Derbyshire		Derbyshire	Gloucestershire	Leicestershire	Match drawn	Match drawn	Surrey	Match drawn	Match drawn
Glamorgan	Match drawn		Glamorgan	Match drawn	Middlesex	Glamorgan	Match drawn	Sussex	Glamorgan
Gloucestershire	Derbyshire	Glamorgan		Gloucestershire	Gloucestershire	Northamptonshire	Surrey	Sussex	Worcestershire
Leicestershire	Leicestershire	Glamorgan	Leicestershire		Match drawn	Leicestershire	Match drawn	Sussex	Worcestershire
Middlesex	Middlesex	Glamorgan	Gloucestershire	Match drawn		Northamptonshire	Middlesex	Match drawn	Worcestershire
Northamptonshire	Match drawn	Northamptonshire	Gloucestershire	Leicestershire	Northamptonshire		Surrey	Northamptonshire	Match drawn
Surrey	Derbyshire	Match drawn	Gloucestershire	Leicestershire	Match drawn	Surrey		Match drawn	Match drawn
Sussex	Sussex	Match drawn	Sussex	Sussex	Middlesex	Sussex	Sussex		Match drawn
Worcestershire	Worcestershire	Glamorgan	Match drawn	Leicestershire	Worcestershire	Northamptonshire	Worcestershire	Worcestershire	

Home team won	Visiting team won	Match drawn

Source: Last updated : 16 September 2010
