= Freddie McCann =

English cricketer (born 2005)

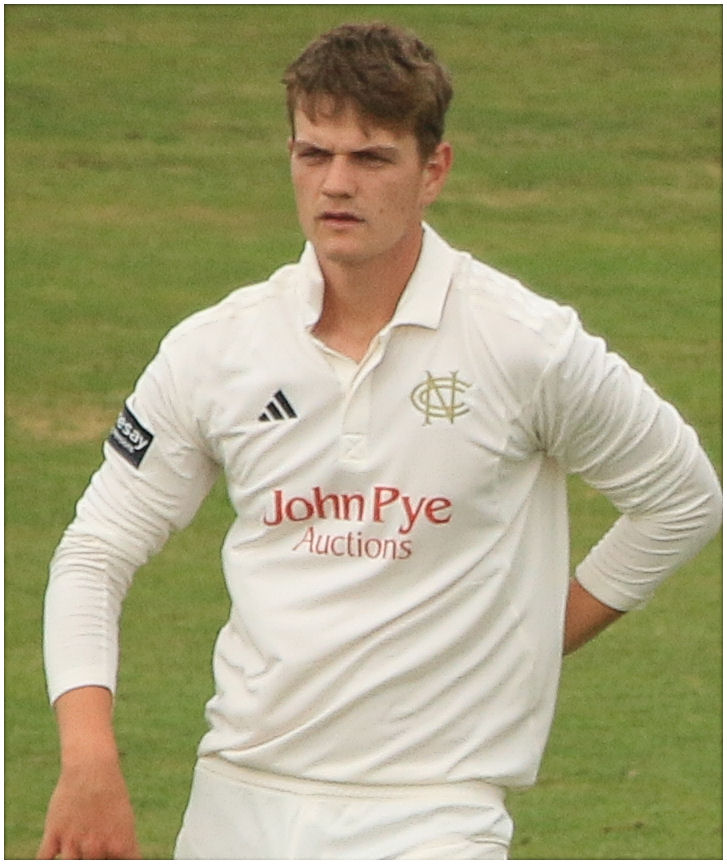
- McCann in 2025

Personal information
- Full name: Freddie William McCann
- Born: 19 April 2005 (age 21); Nottingham, Nottinghamshire, England
- Height: 6 ft 3 in (191 cm)
- Batting: Left-handed
- Bowling: Right arm off break

Domestic team information
- Years: Team
- 2024–present: Nottinghamshire (squad no. 44)
- FC debut: 22 August 2024 Nottinghamshire v Durham
- LA debut: 24 July 2024 Nottinghamshire v Leicestershire

Career statistics
Competition	FC	LA	T20
Matches	28	20	21
Runs scored	1,368	565	264
Batting average	32.57	28.25	15.52
100s/50s	3/5	0/4	0/0
Top score	154	91	48
Balls bowled	828	454	54
Wickets	9	6	1
Bowling average	50.77	69.83	56.00
5 wickets in innings	0	0	0
10 wickets in match	0	0	0
Best bowling	3/53	1/6	1/3
Catches/stumpings	38/–	21/–	10/–
- Source: Cricinfo, 26 September 2026

Freddie William McCann (born 19 April 2005) is an English cricketer who plays for Nottinghamshire and England national under-19 cricket team. He is a left-handed batsman and right arm off break bowler.

== Domestic career ==
A member of the Nottinghamshire Academy, McCann scored 417 runs in seven Second XI Championship games at an average of 62.05 and averaged 64.55 in County Age Group and Academy cricket in 2023. He subsequently signed a two-year professional contract with Nottinghamshire County Cricket Club in November 2023.

He made his first team debut for Nottinghamshire in a T20 Blast match against Yorkshire at Headingley on 19 July 2024, opening the batting and scoring 48 off 32 balls including five 4s and two 6s. Two days later he took his maiden first team wicket in Nottinghamshire's NCCA showcase 50 over match against Lincolnshire at Lindum Sports Club Ground.

McCann made his List A debut for Nottinghamshire against Leicestershire in the 2024 One-Day Cup at Grace Road on 24 July 2024, scoring 23 and taking three catches.

He made his First-class debut for Nottinghamshire against Durham in a County Championship match at the Riverside on 22 August 2024. He scored 51 in his first innings. Later that month McCann made his maiden first-class century, scoring 154 for Nottinghamshire in a County Championship match against Surrey at Trent Bridge.

McCann compiled his second first-class century in Nottinghamshire's final County Championship match of the 2024 season against Warwickshire, scoring 130.

Along with Farhan Ahmed, he was named joint Nottinghamshire emerging player of the year for the 2024 season.

McCann signed a three-year contract extension with Nottinghamshire in November 2024.

He made his third first-class century in May 2025, scoring 138 including 15 fours and a six against Hampshire at Trent Bridge.

== International career ==
McCann scored 174 from 139 balls for England U19 against Sri Lanka U19 in Hove on 1 July 2024. His innings equalled the record for the highest under-19 ODI score for England set by Dan Lawrence at the 2016 U19 Cricket World Cup. McCann was named in the squad for the Youth Test series between the two sides later that month and scored 92 in the first match. He was named in the England Lions squad for their tour of South Africa in November and December 2024. McCann was also included in the Lions squad to tour Australia in January 2025.
