= Charlie Allison =

English cricketer (born 2005)

Charles Allison
Personal information
- Full name: Charles William James Allison
- Born: 2 March 2005 (age 21); Colchester, Essex, England
- Batting: Right-handed
- Bowling: Right arm medium
- Relatives: Ben Allison (brother)

Domestic team information
- Years: Team
- 2023–present: Essex (squad no. 56)
- FC debut: 4 April 2025 Essex v Surrey
- LA debut: 1 August 2023 Essex v Lancashire

Career statistics
Competition	FC	LA	T20
Matches	27	20	31
Runs scored	1,599	806	636
Batting average	35.53	42.42	30.28
100s/50s	4/5	1/6	0/4
Top score	140	131	74
Catches/stumpings	10/–	2/–	16/–
- Source: ESPNcricinfo, 27 September 2026

Charles William James Allison (born 2 March 2005) is an English cricketer who plays for Essex County Cricket Club. He is a right-handed batsman.

== Early and personal life ==
Born in Colchester and the younger brother of Worcestershire cricketer Ben Allison, Charlie started playing at the Essex academy at nine years-old. An Essex fan from a young age, Allison had gone viral in 2012 when a video of him playing cricket shots at Holmwood House Preparatory (his school at the time), was posted on YouTube and led to praise from his favourite Essex cricketer at the time, Graham Napier. He attended Royal Hospital School in Holbrook, Suffolk.

== Career ==
Allison signed a rookie contract with Essex County Cricket Club in July 2023. He made his List-A cricket debut for Essex on 1 August 2023, against Lancashire in the 2023 One-Day Cup, in a match abandoned due to rain. Allison scored his first half-century for the county when he scored 70 against Middlesex on 12 August 2023. He hit a new top score of 85 on 15 August 2023, against Leicestershire. He was singled out for praise by Essex head coach Anthony McGrath for how he has assimilated into the first team. Allison signed a new two-year contract with Essex in October 2024.

In summer 2025, he started in the Essex team as an opening batsman in the absence of Dean Elgar.

He was named in the England Lions squad for the 2026 series against South Africa A.

In September 2026, Allison agreed a two-year contract extension with Essex tying him into the club until at least the end of the 2028 season.
