= Ben Allison (cricketer) =

English cricketer (born 1999)

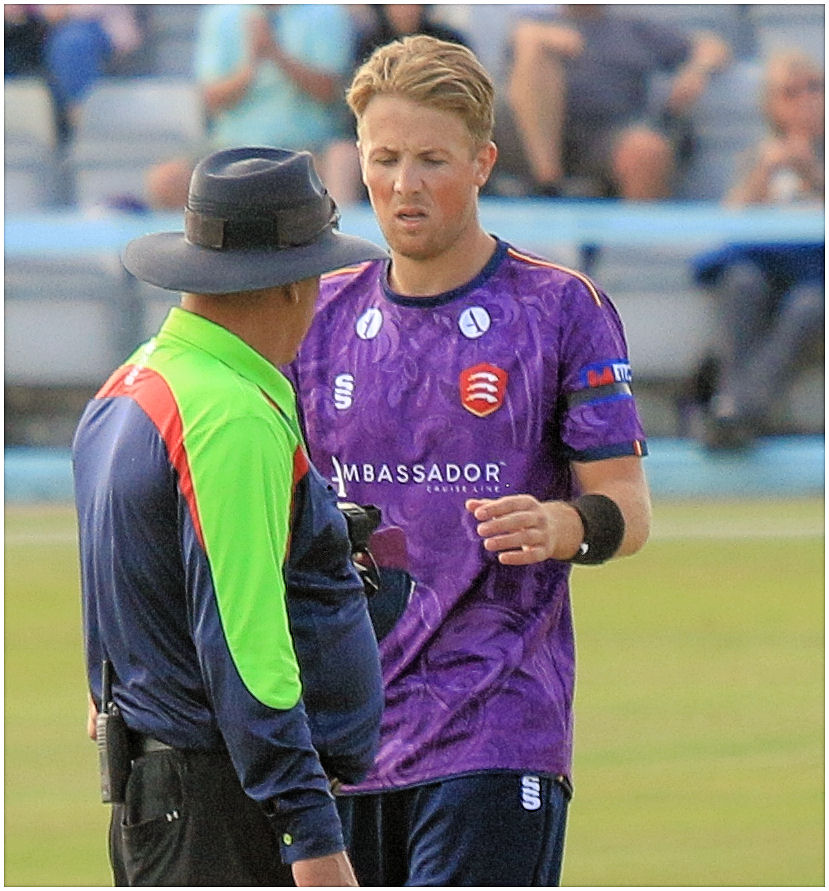
- Allison in 2024

Personal information
- Full name: Benjamin Michael John Allison
- Born: 18 December 1999 (age 26); Colchester, Essex, England
- Batting: Right-handed
- Bowling: Right-arm fast-medium
- Relatives: Charlie Allison (brother)

Domestic team information
- Years: Team
- 2019–2024: Essex (squad no. 65)
- 2019: → Gloucestershire (on loan)
- 2023: → Worcestershire (on loan)
- 2025–present: Worcestershire (squad no. 65)
- FC debut: 18 August 2019 Gloucestershire v Derbyshire
- LA debut: 29 July 2021 Essex v Worcestershire

Career statistics
Competition	FC	LA	T20
Matches	36	35	34
Runs scored	770	316	60
Batting average	16.73	31.60	10.00
100s/50s	0/5	0/0	0/0
Top score	89	32*	17
Balls bowled	5,469	1,754	568
Wickets	106	46	36
Bowling average	26.00	36.45	26.83
5 wickets in innings	5	1	0
10 wickets in match	1	0	0
Best bowling	6/42	6/35	3/33
Catches/stumpings	20/–	17/–	20/–
- Source: Cricinfo, 26 September 2026

Benjamin Michael John Allison (born 18 December 1999) is an English cricketer. He made his first-class debut on 18 August 2019, for Gloucestershire in the 2019 County Championship, while on loan from Essex. He made his Twenty20 debut 20 September 2020, for Essex in the 2020 t20 Blast. He made his List A debut on 29 July 2021, for Essex in the 2021 Royal London One-Day Cup. In September 2023 Allison joined Worcestershire on loan for the remainder of the season. In September 2024, he signed a three-year contract with Worcestershire. Allison agreed a three-year contract extension with Worcestershire in October 2026, tying him into the club until at least the end of the 2029 season.
