= List of Sussex Cricket Board List A players =

A cricket team representing the Sussex Cricket Board played eight List A cricket matches between 1999 and 2002. This is a list of the players who appeared in those matches.

- Steven Ades, 5 matches, 2000–2001
- Danny Alderman, 6 matches, 1999–2001
- George Campbell, 7 matches, 2000–2002
- Brian Chambers, 1 match, 1999
- Dominic Clapp, 2 matches, 2000
- Andrew Cornford, 3 matches, 2001–2002
- Ian Cox, 1 match, 1999
- Nicholas Creed, 3 matches, 2000–2002
- Jason Finch, 3 matches, 2001–2002
- Richard Halsall, 5 matches, 2000–2001
- Michael Harrison, 1 match, 2002
- Marc Hazelton, 1 match, 2001
- Andrew Hodd, 1 match, 2002
- Carl Hopkinson, 2 matches, 2001
- David Hussey, 3 matches, 2001
- Kashif Ibrahim, 2 matches, 2000
- Richard Jackson, 4 matches, 2001
- Shane Jurgensen, 1 match, 1999
- Chris Mole, 5 matches, 1999–2002
- John Morgan, 7 matches, 2000–2002
- Jonathan Newell, 1 match, 1999
- Mark Newell, 1 match, 1999
- Andrew Perry, 1 match, 2002
- Matt Prior, 1 match, 2000
- Stuart Simmonds, 1 match, 1999
- Bradley Smith, 1 match, 1999
- John Snashall, 2 matches, 2001
- Hugo Southwell, 3 matches, 2000–2001
- Paul Stevens, 8 matches, 1999–2002
- Neil Turk, 1 match, 2002
- Nick Weekes, 1 match, 2001
- Andrew Winstone, 1 match, 2001
- Michael Yardy, 3 matches, 1999–2000
