= 2022 T20 Blast =

Twenty20 cricket tournament

2022 Vitality Blast
- Dates: 25 May – 16 July 2022
- Administrator: England and Wales Cricket Board
- Cricket format: Twenty20
- Tournament format(s): Group stage and knockout
- Champions: Hampshire Hawks (3rd title)
- Participants: 18
- Matches: 133
- Most runs: James Vince (678) (Hampshire Hawks)
- Most wickets: Richard Gleeson (25) (Lancashire Lightning)
- Official website: Vitality Blast

The 2022 Vitality Blast was the twentieth edition of the T20 Blast (currently known as the Vitality Blast), a professional Twenty20 cricket league played in England and Wales. The tournament was held from 25 May to 16 July 2022. The tournament was run by the England and Wales Cricket Board (ECB), was branded as the Vitality Blast due to the tournament's sponsorship reason. The Kent Spitfires were the defending champions, having won their second title during previous season. On 20 January 2022, the ECB announced the fixtures for the tournament.

On 17 June 2022, in the North Group match between the Birmingham Bears and the Notts Outlaws, the Birmingham Bears set a new record for the highest total in an English T20 match, with 261/2. Four days later, Surrey became the first team to qualify for the quarter-finals, with their ninth win out of ten games. Following the conclusion of matches played on 1 July 2022, Somerset, the Essex Eagles, and the Hampshire Hawks from the South Group had all confirmed their places in the quarter-finals. The Birmingham Bears also qualified, after winning the North Group. The Derbyshire Falcons and the Lancashire Lightning also qualified from the North Group, with the Yorkshire Vikings taking the final place in the quarter-finals.

The Yorkshire Vikings, the Hampshire Hawks, Lancashire Lightning and Somerset all won their quarter-final matches to secure their places at Finals Day. In Somerset's match, against the Derbyshire Falcons, Somerset set a new record for the highest team total in an English T20 match, with 265/5, breaking the record set earlier in the tournament by the Birmingham Bears. In the final, the Hampshire Hawks beat Lancashire Lightning by one run to win their third title.

== Format ==
Playing format were similar to the previous season, where groups remain the same with the familiar North and South split, while each county will play 14 group-stage matches, seven at home and seven away.

== Teams ==
The teams were divided into the following groups:

- North Group: Birmingham Bears, Derbyshire Falcons, Durham, Lancashire Lightning, Leicestershire Foxes, Northants Steelbacks, Notts Outlaws, Worcestershire Rapids, Yorkshire Vikings
- South Group: Essex Eagles, Glamorgan, Gloucestershire, Hampshire Hawks, Kent Spitfires, Middlesex, Somerset, Surrey, Sussex Sharks

== Results and standings ==
=== North Group ===
Pos	Team	Pld	W	L	T	NR	Pts	NRR
1	Birmingham Bears	14	9	5	0	0	18	1.210
2	Lancashire Lightning	14	8	4	1	1	18	0.432
3	Derbyshire Falcons	14	9	5	0	0	18	0.054
4	Yorkshire Vikings	14	7	6	1	0	15	0.726
5	Notts Outlaws	14	7	6	0	1	15	0.058
6	Leicestershire Foxes (Note: Leicestershire Foxes were given a two-point penalty due to on-field rules breaches in their match against the Northants Steelbacks.)	14	8	6	0	0	14	0.058
7	Northants Steelbacks	14	6	6	0	2	14	−0.040
8	Durham	14	3	10	0	1	7	−0.642
9	Worcestershire Rapids	14	2	11	0	1	5	−1.807

Source: BBC Sport, England and Wales Cricket Board
Notes:

Advanced to the quarter-finals

25 May 2022 (D/N)
Scorecard

Worcestershire Rapids; 172/9 (20 overs)	v	Yorkshire Vikings; 175/3 (18.1 overs)
Jack Haynes 61 (33); Jordan Thompson 3/35 (4 overs)		Harry Brook 60* (27); Brett D'Oliveira 1/18 (3 overs)

Yorkshire Vikings won by 7 wickets
Headingley, Leeds
Umpires: Neil Mallender and Russell Warren

- Worcestershire Rapids won the toss and elected to bat.
- Josh Baker (Worcestershire Rapids) made his T20 debut.

26 May 2022 (D/N)
Scorecard

Birmingham Bears; 207/3 (16 overs)	v	Northants Steelbacks; 81 (14.2 overs)
Paul Stirling 119 (51); Ben Sanderson 2/42 (4 overs)		Chris Lynn 16 (11); Jake Lintott 3/19 (3 overs)

Birmingham Bears won by 126 runs (DLS method)
Edgbaston, Birmingham
Umpires: Graham Lloyd and Peter Hartley

- Birmingham Bears won the toss and elected to bat.
- Northants Steelbacks were set a revised target of 208 runs from 16 overs due to rain.
- James Sales (Northants Steelbacks) made his T20 debut.

26 May 2022 (D/N)
Scorecard

Durham; 184/8 (20 overs)	v	Leicestershire Foxes; 130 (17.5 overs)
Paul Coughlin 42 (30); Rehan Ahmed 2/22 (4 overs)		Rishi Patel 40 (31); Paul Coughlin 4/15 (3 overs)

Durham won by 54 runs
Grace Road, Leicester
Umpires: Rob Bailey and Hassan Adnan

- Leicestershire Foxes won the toss and elected to field.
- Michael Jones (Durham) and Rehan Ahmed (Leicestershire Foxes) both made their T20 debuts.

27 May 2022 (D/N)
Scorecard

Lancashire Lightning; 183/7 (20 overs)	v	Yorkshire Vikings; 183/5 (20 overs)
Phil Salt 59 (41); Haris Rauf 2/39 (4 overs)		Harry Brook 72 (48); Luke Wood 2/36 (3 overs)

Match tied
Old Trafford, Manchester
Umpires: Neil Mallender and Russell Warren
Player of the match: Harry Brook (Yorkshire Vikings)

- Lancashire Lightning won the toss and elected to bat.

27 May 2022 (D/N)
Scorecard

Worcestershire Rapids; 164/9 (20 overs)	v	Notts Outlaws; 168/6 (19.4 overs)
Colin Munro 66 (43); Luke Fletcher 5/33 (3 overs)		Joe Clarke 52 (34); Brett D'Oliveira 2/24 (4 overs)

Notts Outlaws won by 4 wickets
Trent Bridge, Nottingham
Umpires: Rob Bailey and Richard Illingworth

- Notts Outlaws won the toss and elected to field.

27 May 2022 (D/N)
Scorecard

Northants Steelbacks; 223/4 (20 overs)	v	Durham; 192 (18.5 overs)
Chris Lynn 83 (46); Ashton Turner 2/24 (2.2 overs)		Graham Clark 54 (30); Freddie Heldreich 3/22 (4 overs)

Northants Steelbacks won by 31 runs
County Cricket Ground, Northampton
Umpires: Ian Blackwell and Nigel Llong

- Northants Steelbacks won the toss and elected to bat.

27 May 2022 (D/N)
Scorecard

Birmingham Bears; 200/6 (20 overs)	v	Derbyshire Falcons; 197/8 (20 overs)
Adam Hose 55 (31); Sam Conners 3/33 (3 overs)		Brooke Guest 54 (34); Danny Briggs 2/30 (4 overs); Jake Lintott 2/30 (4 overs)

Birmingham Bears won by 3 runs
County Cricket Ground, Derby
Umpires: Neil Pratt and David Millns

- Birmingham Bears won the toss and elected to bat.

28 May 2022
Scorecard

Derbyshire Falcons; 159/5 (20 overs)	v	Leicestershire Foxes; 89 (15.3 overs)
Shan Masood 53 (43); Ben Mike 1/4 (1 over)		Ben Mike 26* (27); Hayden Kerr 2/6 (1.3 overs)

Derbyshire Falcons won by 70 runs
Grace Road, Leicester
Umpires: James Middlebrook and Peter Hartley
Player of the match: Shan Masood (Derbyshire Falcons)

- Leicestershire Foxes won the toss and elected to field.

29 May 2022
Scorecard

Durham; 158/9 (20 overs)	v	Birmingham Bears; 162/5 (16.5 overs)
Paul Coughlin 40 (33); Henry Brookes 3/38 (4 overs)		Chris Benjamin 68* (36); Liam Trevaskis 2/35 (4 overs)

Birmingham Bears won by 5 wickets
Edgbaston, Birmingham
Umpires: Neil Mallender and Ian Blackwell

- Durham won the toss and elected to bat.
- George Drissell (Durham) made his T20 debut.

29 May 2022
Scorecard

Lancashire Lightning; 183/7 (20 overs)	v	Worcestershire Rapids; 171/8 (20 overs)
Tim David 60 (25); Pat Brown 3/35 (4 overs)		Colin Munro 53 (36); Richard Gleeson 5/33 (4 overs)

Lancashire Lightning won by 12 runs
Old Trafford, Manchester
Umpires: Steve O'Shaughnessy and Paul Pollard

- Lancashire Lightning won the toss and elected to bat.
- Richard Gleeson (Lancashire Lightning) took his first five-wicket haul in Twenty20 cricket.

29 May 2022
Scorecard

Leicestershire Foxes; 188/7 (20 overs)	v	Yorkshire Vikings; 157/9 (20 overs)
Rishi Patel 57 (37); Jordan Thompson 3/34 (4 overs)		Dawid Malan 50 (38); Naveen-ul-Haq 4/34 (4 overs)

Leicestershire Foxes won by 31 runs
Headingley, Leeds
Umpires: Neil Pratt and David Millns

- Leicestershire Foxes won the toss and elected to bat.

30 May 2022 (D/N)
Scorecard

Notts Outlaws; 140/6 (18 overs)	v	Northants Steelbacks
Samit Patel 63 (44); Matthew Kelly 4/29 (4 overs)

No result
Trent Bridge, Nottingham
Umpires: Paul Baldwin and Russell Warren

- Northants Steelbacks won the toss and elected to field.
- Rain prevented any further play.

31 May 2022 (D/N)
Scorecard

Lancashire Lightning; 178/7 (20 overs)	v	Notts Outlaws; 91 (14.4 overs)
Keaton Jennings 55 (37); Dane Paterson 2/30 (3 overs)		Luke Fletcher 21 (12); Liam Livingstone 3/33 (3.4 overs)

Lancashire Lightning won by 87 runs
Trent Bridge, Nottingham
Umpires: David Millns and Ian Blackwell

- Notts Outlaws won the toss and elected to field.

31 May 2022 (D/N)
Scorecard

Yorkshire Vikings; 83/3 (8 overs)	v	Derbyshire Falcons; 84/1 (7.3 overs)
Dawid Malan 50 (23); Hayden Kerr 2/18 (2 overs)		Wayne Madsen 39* (21)

Derbyshire Falcons won by 9 wickets
Headingley, Leeds
Umpires: Paul Pollard and Russell Warren

- Derbyshire Falcons won the toss and elected to field.
- The match was reduced to 8 overs per side due to rain.
- Wayne Madsen played in his 400th match for Derbyshire.

1 June 2022
Scorecard

Lancashire Lightning; 219/6 (20 overs)	v	Derbyshire Falcons; 202/5 (20 overs)
Liam Livingstone 75 (40); George Scrimshaw 3/45 (4 overs)		Leus du Plooy 57* (30); Tom Hartley 2/39 (3 overs)

Lancashire Lightning won by 17 runs
Old Trafford, Manchester
Umpires: Neil Mallender and Tim Robinson

- Lancashire Lightning won the toss and elected to bat.

1 June 2022 (D/N)
Scorecard

Durham; 186/7 (20 overs)	v	Worcestershire Rapids; 138/9 (20 overs)
Michael Jones 44 (25); Brett D'Oliveira 3/23 (4 overs)		Ben Cox 27 (30); Ben Raine 3/23 (4 overs)

Durham won by 48 runs
Riverside Ground, Chester-le-Street
Umpires: Neil Pratt and David Millns

- Worcestershire Rapids won the toss and elected to field.

1 June 2022 (D/N)
Scorecard

Northants Steelbacks; 227/1 (20 overs)	v	Leicestershire Foxes; 185/9 (20 overs)
Chris Lynn 106* (66); Rehan Ahmed 1/39 (4 overs)		Scott Steel 64 (45); Ben Sanderson 3/30 (4 overs)

Northants Steelbacks won by 42 runs
County Ground, Northampton
Umpires: Paul Baldwin and Billy Taylor

- Northants Steelbacks won the toss and elected to bat.

2 June 2022
Scorecard

Leicestershire Foxes; 152/9 (20 overs)	v	Birmingham Bears; 147/9 (20 overs)
Scott Steel 72 (51); Jake Lintott 4/27 (4 overs)		Alex Davies 43 (31); Ben Mike 3/30 (4 overs)

Leicestershire Foxes won by 5 runs
Edgbaston, Birmingham
Umpires: Ian Blackwell and Paul Pollard

- Leicestershire Foxes won the toss and elected to bat.

3 June 2022
Scorecard

Worcestershire Rapids; 217/5 (20 overs)	v	Birmingham Bears; 202/8 (20 overs)
Brett D'Oliveira 71 (38); Carlos Brathwaite 2/49 (4 overs)		Sam Hain 45 (33); Dillon Pennington 3/30 (3 overs)

Worcestershire Rapids won by 15 runs
New Road, Worcester
Umpires: David Millns and James Middlebrook

- Birmingham Bears won the toss and elected to field.

3 June 2022 (D/N)
Scorecard

Northants Steelbacks; 153/6 (20 overs)	v	Lancashire Lightning; 155/8 (19.5 overs)
Saif Zaib 57* (41); Richard Gleeson 1/18 (3 overs)		Tim David 42 (26); James Neesham 4/26 (3.5 overs)

Lancashire Lightning won by 2 wickets
Old Trafford Cricket Ground, Manchester
Umpires: Neil Pratt and Rob White

- Northants Steelbacks won the toss and elected to bat.
- Alex Russell (Northants Steelbacks) made his T20 debut.

3 June 2022 (D/N)
Scorecard

Durham; 207/8 (20 overs)	v	Yorkshire Vikings; 210/4 (17.4 overs)
Graham Clark 65 (37); Jordan Thompson 4/32 (4 overs)		Adam Lyth 77 (33); Ben Raine 2/14 (2 overs)

Yorkshire Vikings won by 6 wickets
Headingley, Leeds
Umpires: Steve O'Shaughnessy and Tim Robinson

- Durham won the toss and elected to bat.

3 June 2022 (D/N)
Scorecard

Derbyshire Falcons; 178 (20 overs)	v	Notts Outlaws; 182/3 (17.1 overs)
Leus du Plooy 51 (34); Jake Ball 4/40 (4 overs)		Alex Hales 91 (33); George Scrimshaw 2/35 (4 overs)

Notts Outlaws won by 7 wickets
County Cricket Ground, Derby
Umpires: Neil Mallender and Paul Baldwin
Player of the match: Alex Hales (Notts Outlaws)

- Notts Outlaws won the toss and elected to field.

5 June 2022
Scorecard

Birmingham Bears; 98/5 (8 overs)	v	Notts Outlaws; 97/5 (8 overs)
Chris Benjamin 36 (17); Samit Patel 2/12 (2 overs)		Alex Hales 30 (9); Jake Lintott 2/6 (2 overs)

Birmingham Bears won by 1 run
Edgbaston, Birmingham
Umpires: Peter Hartley and Steve O'Shaughnessy

- Notts Outlaws won the toss and elected to field.
- The match was reduced to 8 overs per side due to rain.
- Carlos Brathwaite (Birmingham Bears) and Samit Patel (Notts Outlaws) both retired out.

5 June 2022
Scorecard

Durham; 154/8 (20 overs)	v	Northants Steelbacks; 158/6 (19.3 overs)
Graham Clark 44 (34); Graeme White 3/14 (4 overs)		Chris Lynn 61 (47); Andrew Tye 3/28 (4 overs)

Northants Steelbacks won by 4 wickets
Riverside Ground, Chester-le-Street
Umpires: Neil Mallender and Tom Lungley

- Durham won the toss and elected to bat.

5 June 2022
Scorecard

Leicestershire Foxes; 162/6 (20 overs)	v	Worcestershire Rapids; 136 (19 overs)
Rishi Patel 37 (25); Ed Barnard 2/17 (3 overs)		Ed Barnard 27 (25); Naveen-ul-Haq 5/11 (4 overs)

Leicestershire Foxes won by 26 runs
New Road, Worcester
Umpires: Graham Lloyd and Russell Warren

- Worcestershire Rapids won the toss and elected to field.
- Naveen-ul-Haq (Leicestershire Foxes) took his first five-wicket haul in Twenty20 cricket.

6 June 2022 (D/N)
Scorecard

Yorkshire Vikings; 202/5 (20 overs)	v	Notts Outlaws; 179/7 (20 overs)
Jonny Tattersall 48* (30); Jake Ball 3/29 (3 overs)		Steven Mullaney 79 (46); Dominic Drakes 3/31 (4 overs)

Yorkshire Vikings won by 23 runs
Headingley, Leeds
Umpires: James Middlebrook and Paul Baldwin

- Notts Outlaws won the toss and elected to field.

7 June 2022 (D/N)
Scorecard

Derbyshire Falcons; 151/9 (20 overs)	v	Northants Steelbacks; 155/5 (18.1 overs)
Wayne Madsen 37 (27); Tom Taylor 4/27 (4 overs)		Josh Cobb 70 (44); George Scrimshaw 2/32 (4 overs)

Northants Steelbacks won by 5 wickets
County Cricket Ground, Northampton
Umpires: Neil Bainton and Billy Taylor

- Derbyshire Falcons won the toss and elected to bat.

7 June 2022 (D/N)
Scorecard

Leicestershire Foxes; 135 (19.1 overs)	v	Lancashire Lightning; 139/3 (16.1 overs)
Lewis Hill 50 (34); Danny Lamb 2/10 (2.1 overs)		Steven Croft 45 (31); Naveen-ul-Haq 2/32 (3.1 overs)

Lancashire Lightning won by 7 wickets
Grace Road, Leicester
Umpires: Richard Kettleborough and Nigel Llong

- Leicestershire Foxes won the toss and elected to bat.

8 June 2022 (D/N)
Scorecard

Lancashire Lightning; 213/5 (20 overs)	v	Yorkshire Vikings; 209/8 (20 overs)
Tim David 66 (32); Jordan Thompson 2/52 (4 overs)		Tom Kohler-Cadmore 77 (43); Tom Hartley 2/21 (3 overs)

Lancashire Lightning won by 4 runs
Headingley, Leeds
Umpires: Peter Hartley and Graham Lloyd
Player of the match: Tim David (Lancashire Lightning)

- Yorkshire Vikings won the toss and elected to field.

8 June 2022 (D/N)
Scorecard

Durham; 141/7 (20 overs)	v	Birmingham Bears; 142/4 (18 overs)
Ben Raine 48* (31); Craig Miles 3/29 (4 overs)		Alex Davies 49 (47); Ben Raine 2/22 (4 overs)

Birmingham Bears won by 6 wickets
Riverside Ground, Chester-le-Street
Umpires: Tom Lungley and Tim Robinson

- Durham won the toss and elected to bat.

9 June 2022 (D/N)
Scorecard

Northants Steelbacks; 220/3 (20 overs)	v	Worcestershire Rapids; 147 (16.4 overs)
Chris Lynn 113* (57); Dwayne Bravo 2/15 (4 overs)		Ed Barnard 42 (29); Josh Cobb 5/25 (3.4 overs)

Northants Steelbacks won by 73 runs
County Cricket Ground, Northampton
Umpires: Nick Cook and Nigel Llong

- Northants Steelbacks won the toss and elected to bat.
- Jacques Banton (Worcestershire Rapids) made his T20 debut.

9 June 2022 (D/N)
Scorecard

Leicestershire Foxes; 181/6 (20 overs)	v	Derbyshire Falcons; 182/4 (18.4 overs)
Arron Lilley 67 (41); Hayden Kerr 2/25 (3 overs)		Shan Masood 73 (32); Ben Mike 1/21 (3 overs)

Derbyshire Falcons won by 6 wickets
County Cricket Ground, Derby
Umpires: Rob White and Billy Taylor

- Derbyshire Falcons won the toss and elected to field.

10 June 2022 (D/N)
Scorecard

Derbyshire Falcons; 168/7 (20 overs)	v	Worcestershire Rapids; 129/9 (20 overs)
Shan Masood 65 (47); Moeen Ali 2/24 (4 overs)		Brett D'Oliveira 55 (33); Mattie McKiernan 3/19 (4 overs)

Derbyshire Falcons won by 39 runs
New Road, Worcester
Umpires: Ian Blackwell and Mike Burns

- Worcestershire Rapids won the toss and elected to field.

10 June 2022 (D/N)
Scorecard

Birmingham Bears; 101 (16.5 overs)	v	Yorkshire Vikings; 106/0 (12.5 overs)
Chris Benjamin 26 (24); David Willey 3/17 (3.5 overs)		Adam Lyth 58* (45)

Yorkshire Vikings won by 10 wickets
Edgbaston, Birmingham
Umpires: Billy Taylor and Rob White

- Birmingham Bears won the toss and elected to bat.
- Dom Leech (Yorkshire Vikings) made his T20 debut.

10 June 2022 (D/N)
Scorecard

Lancashire Lightning; 130 (20 overs)	v	Durham; 131/8 (19.3 overs)
Steven Croft 55 (52); Nathan Sowter 3/22 (4 overs)		Ned Eckersley 46 (42); Richard Gleeson 4/19 (4 overs)

Durham won by 2 wickets
Riverside Ground, Chester-le-Street
Umpires: Graham Lloyd and James Middlebrook

- Lancashire Lightning won the toss and elected to bat.

10 June 2022 (D/N)
Scorecard

Leicestershire Foxes; 123 (18.4 overs)	v	Notts Outlaws; 127/5 (13.2 overs)
Wiaan Mulder 32 (26); Dane Paterson 2/12 (2.4 overs)		Ben Duckett 44* (23); Naveen-ul-Haq 2/21 (2 overs)

Notts Outlaws won by 5 wickets
Grace Road, Leicester
Umpires: Rob Bailey and Peter Hartley

- Leicestershire Foxes won the toss and elected to bat.

17 June 2022 (D/N)
Scorecard

Yorkshire Vikings; 201/5 (20 overs)	v	Durham; 136/8 (20 overs)
Tom Kohler-Cadmore 48* (37); Scott Borthwick 3/34 (4 overs)		Ollie Robinson 44 (35); Jack Shutt 4/35 (4 overs)

Yorkshire Vikings won by 65 runs
Riverside Ground, Chester-le-Street
Umpires: Graham Lloyd and James Middlebrook

- Yorkshire Vikings won the toss and elected to bat.
- Jonathan Bushnell (Durham) made his T20 debut.

17 June 2022 (D/N)
Scorecard

Worcestershire Rapids; 116/9 (20 overs)	v	Leicestershire Foxes; 118/2 (12.1 overs)
Kashif Ali 24 (30); Ben Mike 3/20 (4 overs)		Arron Lilley 68* (38); Pat Brown 1/14 (2 overs)

Leicestershire Foxes won by 8 wickets
Grace Road, Leicester
Umpires: Nick Cook and Tom Lungley

- Worcestershire Rapids won the toss and elected to bat.
- Mitchell Stanley (Worcestershire Rapids) made his T20 debut.

17 June 2022 (D/N)
Scorecard

Lancashire Lightning; 153/7 (20 overs)	v	Northants Steelbacks; 154/3 (16.2 overs)
Dane Vilas 38 (22); Ben Sanderson 2/28 (4 overs); Graeme White 2/28 (4 overs)		Josh Cobb 57 (32); Danny Lamb 1/19 (2 overs)

Northants Steelbacks won by 7 wickets
County Cricket Ground, Northampton
Umpires: Neil Bainton and Ben Debenham

- Lancashire Lightning won the toss and elected to bat.

17 June 2022 (D/N)
Scorecard

Birmingham Bears; 261/2 (20 overs)	v	Notts Outlaws; 206 (18.2 overs)
Sam Hain 112* (52); Matt Carter 1/42 (3 overs)		Joe Clarke 86 (45); Carlos Brathwaite 3/31 (3.2 overs)

Birmingham Bears won by 55 runs
Trent Bridge, Nottingham
Umpires: Russell Warren and Chris Watts

- Notts Outlaws won the toss and elected to field.
- Sam Hain (Birmingham Bears) scored his first century in Twenty20 cricket.

18 June 2022
Scorecard

Worcestershire Rapids	v	Northants Steelbacks

No result
New Road, Worcester
Umpires: Ian Blackwell and Mike Burns

- Northants Steelbacks won the toss and elected to field.
- No play was possible due to rain.

18 June 2022
Scorecard

Yorkshire Vikings; 175 (20 overs)	v	Derbyshire Falcons; 105/4 (9.4 overs)
Harry Brook 77 (50); George Scrimshaw 3/20 (4 overs)		Leus du Plooy 48* (20); Dom Leech 3/13 (2 overs)

Derbyshire Falcons won by 6 wickets (DLS method)
Queen's Park, Chesterfield
Umpires: Richard Kettleborough and Rob White

- Derbyshire Falcons won the toss and elected to field.
- Derbyshire Falcons were set a revised target of 105 runs from 10 overs due to rain.

19 June 2022
Scorecard

Leicestershire Foxes; 157/9 (20 overs)	v	Durham; 106 (16.4 overs)
Wiaan Mulder 54 (33); Andrew Tye 5/38 (4 overs)		Paul Coughlin 22 (17); Rehan Ahmed 4/22 (4 overs)

Leicestershire Foxes won by 51 runs
Riverside Ground, Chester-le-Street
Umpires: Peter Hartley and Paul Pollard
Player of the match: Wiaan Mulder (Leicestershire Foxes)

- Leicestershire Foxes won the toss and elected to bat.

19 June 2022
Scorecard

Notts Outlaws; 179/7 (20 overs)	v	Lancashire Lightning; 181/4 (18.2 overs)
Samit Patel 45 (36); Tom Hartley 2/27 (4 overs)		Steven Croft 61* (44); Dane Paterson 2/37 (3.2 overs)

Lancashire Lightning won by 6 wickets
Stanley Park, Blackpool
Umpires: Nick Cook and Tom Lungley

- Lancashire Lightning won the toss and elected to field.

19 June 2022
Scorecard

Birmingham Bears; 159/7 (20 overs)	v	Derbyshire Falcons; 160/3 (18.1 overs)
Sam Hain 73* (40); Sam Conners 3/25 (3 overs)		Wayne Madsen 55 (34); Olly Stone 1/29 (4 overs); Carlos Brathwaite 1/29 (4 overs)

Derbyshire Falcons won by 7 wickets
Edgbaston, Birmingham
Umpires: Ben Debenham and Steve O'Shaughnessy

- Birmingham Bears won the toss and elected to bat.

21 June 2022 (D/N)
Scorecard

Leicestershire Foxes; 170 (20 overs)	v	Notts Outlaws; 123 (19.4 overs)
Lewis Hill 39 (26); Samit Patel 2/29 (4 overs)		Alex Hales 55 (43); Naveen-ul-Haq 4/24 (3.4 overs)

Leicestershire Foxes won by 47 runs
Trent Bridge, Nottingham
Umpires: Ben Debenham and James Middlebrook

- Leicestershire Foxes won the toss and elected to bat.

21 June 2022 (D/N)
Scorecard

Northants Steelbacks; 186/7 (20 overs)	v	Derbyshire Falcons; 192/4 (19 overs)
Saif Zaib 92 (58); George Scrimshaw 2/34 (4 overs)		Wayne Madsen 73 (37); Freddie Heldreich 2/33 (4 overs)

Derbyshire Falcons won by 6 wickets
County Cricket Ground, Derby
Umpires: Rob Bailey and Steve O'Shaughnessy

- Derbyshire Falcons won the toss and elected to field.

22 June 2022 (D/N)
Scorecard

Northants Steelbacks; 211/6 (20 overs)	v	Birmingham Bears; 213/4 (18.5 overs)
Saif Zaib 74 (32); Jake Lintott 2/39 (4 overs)		Adam Hose 63* (44); Ben Sanderson 2/18 (3 overs)

Birmingham Bears won by 6 wickets
County Ground, Northampton
Umpires: Graham Lloyd and Nick Cook
Player of the match: Adam Hose (Birmingham Bears)

- Northants Steelbacks won the toss and elected to bat.

23 June 2022
Scorecard

Lancashire Lightning; 133/6 (17.4 overs)	v	Durham
Steven Croft 52* (41); Nathan Sowter 2/17 (4 overs)

No result
Stanley Park, Blackpool
Umpires: Ben Debenham and Paul Baldwin

- Durham won the toss and elected to field.
- No further play was possible due to rain.
- George Bell (Lancashire Lightning) made his T20 debut.

23 June 2022
Scorecard

Worcestershire Rapids; 150/5 (20 overs)	v	Yorkshire Vikings; 151/5 (14.4 overs)
Kashif Ali 46* (32); Dom Bess 3/15 (4 overs)		Tom Kohler-Cadmore 46* (30); Pat Brown 2/40 (3.4 overs)

Yorkshire Vikings won by 5 wickets
New Road, Worcester
Umpires: Alex Wharf and Paul Pollard

- Yorkshire Vikings won the toss and elected to field.

23 June 2022 (D/N)
Scorecard

Notts Outlaws; 247/6 (20 overs)	v	Derbyshire Falcons; 153/9 (20 overs)
Ben Duckett 63 (38); George Scrimshaw 2/62 (4 overs)		Brooke Guest 40 (27); Zak Chappell 3/28 (4 overs)

Notts Outlaws won by 94 runs
Trent Bridge, Nottingham
Umpires: Martin Saggers and Tom Lungley

- Derbyshire Falcons won the toss and elected to field.

24 June 2022 (D/N)
Scorecard

Notts Outlaws; 98/9 (11 overs)	v	Durham; 96/5 (11 overs)
Steven Mullaney 34* (23); Ben Raine 3/12 (2 overs)		Michael Jones 30* (25); Matt Carter 2/13 (2 overs)

Notts Outlaws won by 2 runs
Riverside Ground, Chester-le-Street
Umpires: Neil Pratt and Tim Robinson

- Durham won the toss and elected to field.
- The match was reduced to 11 overs per side due to rain.

24 June 2022 (D/N)
Scorecard

Yorkshire Vikings; 190/7 (20 overs)	v	Northants Steelbacks; 128 (16.2 overs)
Harry Brook 67 (31); Graeme White 3/30 (4 overs)		James Neesham 26 (13); Matthew Waite 3/18 (3 overs)

Yorkshire Vikings won by 62 runs
County Ground, Northampton
Umpires: Martin Saggers and Tom Lungley

- Northants Steelbacks won the toss and elected to field.

24 June 2022 (D/N)
Scorecard

Birmingham Bears; 228/8 (20 overs)	v	Worcestershire Rapids; 84 (15.3 overs)
Adam Hose 110 (53); Adam Finch 3/38 (3 overs)		Colin Munro 34 (28); Danny Briggs 4/25 (4 overs)

Birmingham Bears won by 144 runs
Edgbaston, Birmingham
Umpires: Neil Bainton and Rob Bailey
Player of the match: Adam Hose (Birmingham Bears)

- Worcestershire Rapids won the toss and elected to field.

24 June 2022 (D/N)
Scorecard

Derbyshire Falcons; 188/8 (20 overs)	v	Lancashire Lightning; 183/5 (20 overs)
Shan Masood 75 (50); Richard Gleeson 3/45 (4 overs)		Steven Croft 47 (29); Alex Thomson 1/18 (2 overs)

Derbyshire Falcons won by 5 runs
County Cricket Ground, Derby
Umpires: Hassan Adnan and Nick Cook

- Lancashire Lightning won the toss and elected to field.

1 July 2022
Scorecard

Worcestershire Rapids; 178/6 (20 overs)	v	Lancashire Lightning; 149 (19.3 overs)
Brett D'Oliveira 33 (25); Luke Wells 2/26 (4 overs)		Phil Salt 44 (27); Brett D'Oliveira 4/20 (4 overs)

Worcestershire Rapids won by 29 runs
New Road, Worcester
Umpires: Ian Blackwell and Paul Baldwin

- Lancashire Lightning won the toss and elected to field.

1 July 2022 (D/N)
Scorecard

Leicestershire Foxes; 214/6 (20 overs)	v	Northants Steelbacks; 213/7 (20 overs)
Colin Ackermann 85 (44); Graeme White 2/27 (4 overs)		Chris Lynn 68 (37); Callum Parkinson 2/34 (4 overs)

Leicestershire Foxes won by 1 run
Grace Road, Leicester
Umpires: Richard Illingworth and Russell Warren

- Leicestershire Foxes won the toss and elected to bat.

1 July 2022 (D/N)
Scorecard

Durham; 183/8 (20 overs)	v	Notts Outlaws; 184/6 (17 overs)
Michael Jones 41 (36); Steven Mullaney 3/25 (4 overs)		Ben Duckett 53* (34); Nathan Sowter 3/39 (4 overs)

Notts Outlaws won by 4 wickets
Trent Bridge, Nottingham
Umpires: Tom Lungley and David Millns

- Durham won the toss and elected to bat.

1 July 2022 (D/N)
Scorecard

Birmingham Bears; 238/5 (20 overs)	v	Yorkshire Vikings; 207 (19.2 overs)
Paul Stirling 81 (41); Shadab Khan 2/38 (4 overs)		Adam Lyth 69 (38); Carlos Brathwaite 3/32 (4 overs)

Birmingham Bears won by 31 runs
Headingley, Leeds
Umpires: Neil Mallender and Steve O'Shaughnessy

- Yorkshire Vikings won the toss and elected to field.

3 July 2022
Scorecard

Worcestershire Rapids; 159/8 (20 overs)	v	Notts Outlaws; 165/5 (18.4 overs)
Ed Barnard 38 (23); Jake Ball 4/25 (4 overs)		Ben Duckett 62* (44); Mitchell Stanley 2/30 (3 overs)

Notts Outlaws won by 5 wickets
New Road, Worcester
Umpires: Neil Mallender and Chris Watts

- Notts Outlaws won the toss and elected to field.
- Joey Evison (Notts Outlaws) made his T20 debut.

3 July 2022
Scorecard

Durham; 193/5 (20 overs)	v	Derbyshire Falcons; 194/5 (19.1 overs)
Ollie Robinson 43 (27); Mattie McKiernan 3/29 (4 overs)		Wayne Madsen 100* (47); Scott Borthwick 1/23 (2 overs)

Derbyshire Falcons won by 5 wickets
County Cricket Ground, Derby
Umpires: Peter Hartley and Ian Blackwell

- Derbyshire Falcons won the toss and elected to field.
- Ben Aitchison (Derbyshire Falcons) made his T20 debut.
- Wayne Madsen (Derbyshire Falcons) scored his first century in Twenty20 cricket.

3 July 2022
Scorecard

Leicestershire Foxes; 211/7 (20 overs)	v	Yorkshire Vikings; 151/9 (20 overs)
Colin Ackermann 72* (46); David Willey 3/29 (4 overs)		Adam Lyth 52 (25); Rehan Ahmed 3/17 (4 overs)

Leicestershire Foxes won by 60 runs
Grace Road, Leicester
Umpires: Nigel Llong and Paul Pollard

- Yorkshire Vikings won the toss and elected to field.

3 July 2022 (D/N)
Scorecard

Birmingham Bears; 168/8 (20 overs)	v	Lancashire Lightning; 169/8 (19.3 overs)
Adam Hose 50 (39); Richard Gleeson 2/23 (4 overs)		Dane Vilas 42 (21); Olly Stone 4/21 (4 overs)

Lancashire Lightning won by 2 wickets
Old Trafford Cricket Ground, Manchester
Umpires: Martin Saggers and Russell Warren
Player of the match: Tom Hartley (Lancashire Lightning)

- Birmingham Bears won the toss and elected to bat.

=== South Group ===
Pos	Team	Pld	W	L	T	NR	Pts	NRR
1	Surrey	14	10	3	0	1	21	0.630
2	Somerset	14	10	4	0	0	20	0.630
3	Essex Eagles	14	9	4	0	1	19	0.881
4	Hampshire Hawks	14	9	5	0	0	18	0.198
5	Gloucestershire	14	6	6	0	2	14	0.022
6	Glamorgan	14	5	7	0	2	12	−0.154
7	Sussex Sharks	14	4	10	0	0	8	−0.391
8	Middlesex	14	4	10	0	0	8	−0.981
9	Kent Spitfires	14	3	11	0	0	6	−0.670

Source: BBC Sport, England and Wales Cricket Board

Advanced to the quarter-finals

25 May 2022 (D/N)
Scorecard

Kent Spitfires; 162/6 (20 overs)	v	Somerset; 166/2 (19.1 overs)
Jack Leaning 72* (43); Lewis Gregory 3/25 (4 overs)		Rilee Rossouw 81 * (54); Fred Klaassen 1/21 (3.1 overs)

Somerset won by 8 wickets
St Lawrence Ground, Canterbury
Umpires: Ben Debenham and Tim Robinson
Player of the match: Rilee Rossouw (Somerset)

- Kent Spitfires won the toss and elected to bat.

26 May 2022
Scorecard

Middlesex; 229/9 (20 overs)	v	Gloucestershire; 199/9 (20 overs)
Stephen Eskinazi 87 (37); Ryan Higgins 3/32 (4 overs)		Benny Howell 46 (20); Martin Andersson 3/33 (4 overs)

Middlesex won by 30 runs
Radlett Cricket Club, Radlett
Umpires: Ian Blackwell and Paul Pollard

- Gloucestershire won the toss and elected to field.

26 May 2022 (D/N)
Scorecard

Sussex Sharks; 150/6 (20 overs)	v	Glamorgan; 153/3 (18.5 overs)
Mohammad Rizwan 81* (60); Michael Hogan 3/26 (4 overs)		Sam Northeast 63* (52); Steven Finn 1/13 (1 over)

Glamorgan won by 7 wickets
County Ground, Hove
Umpires: Neil Bainton and Mike Burns

- Glamorgan won the toss and elected to field.
- Joe Cooke (Glamorgan) made his T20 debut.

27 May 2022 (D/N)
Scorecard

Gloucestershire; 193/7 (20 overs)	v	Sussex Sharks; 152/8 (20 overs)
James Bracey 70 (45); Steven Finn 2/15 (4 overs)		Mohammad Rizwan 58 (43); David Payne 3/22 (4 overs)

Gloucestershire won by 41 runs
County Ground, Bristol
Umpires: Alex Wharf and Tom Lungley

- Sussex Sharks won the toss and elected to field.

27 May 2022 (D/N)
Scorecard

Glamorgan; 173/5 (20 overs)	v	Surrey; 174/6 (19.5 overs)
Sam Northeast 65 (51); Sunil Narine 1/17 (4 overs)		Ollie Pope 62 (46); Michael Hogan 5/18 (4 overs)

Surrey won by 4 wickets
The Oval, London
Umpires: Paul Baldwin and Tim Robinson

- Surrey won the toss and elected to field.

27 May 2022 (D/N)
Scorecard

Kent Spitfires; 184/4 (20 overs)	v	Essex Eagles; 188/6 (19.4 overs)
Sam Billings 48* (31); Matt Critchley 1/16 (3 overs)		Paul Walter 47* (32); Fred Klaassen 2/35 (4 overs)

Essex Eagles won by 4 wickets
St Lawrence Ground, Canterbury
Umpires: Mark Newell and Martin Saggers

- Kent Spitfires won the toss and elected to bat.

27 May 2022 (D/N)
Scorecard

Middlesex; 163/6 (20 overs)	v	Hampshire Hawks; 153/8 (20 overs)
Jack Davies 47 (38); Brad Wheal 3/46 (4 overs)		James Vince 47 (38); Luke Hollman 3/34 (4 overs)

Middlesex won by 10 runs
Rose Bowl, Southampton
Umpires: Neil Bainton and Mike Burns

- Hampshire Hawks won the toss and elected to field.

29 May 2022
Scorecard

Glamorgan; 168 (20 overs)	v	Middlesex; 172/6 (19 overs)
Marnus Labuschagne 38 (24); Toby Roland-Jones 4/22 (4 overs)		Joe Cracknell 47 (28); Prem Sisodiya 2/26 (4 overs)

Middlesex won by 4 wickets
Radlett Cricket Club, Radlett
Umpires: Nigel Llong and Tim Robinson

- Middlesex won the toss and elected to field.

29 May 2022
Scorecard

Sussex Sharks; 171/5 (20 overs)	v	Kent Spitfires; 167/7 (20 overs)
Tom Alsop 65* (30); Qais Ahmad 2/23 (4 overs)		George Linde 38* (13); Ravi Bopara 2/23 (4 overs)

Sussex Sharks won by 4 runs
County Ground, Hove
Umpires: Neil Bainton and Mike Burns

- Kent Spitfires won the toss and elected to field.

29 May 2022
Scorecard

Essex Eagles; 139/9 (18 overs)	v	Somerset; 147/4 (14.4 overs)
Matt Critchley 60 (38); Marchant de Lange 4/9 (3 overs)		Rilee Rossouw 67 (29); Simon Harmer 2/22 (4 overs)

Somerset won by 6 wickets (DLS method)
County Ground, Taunton
Umpires: Alex Wharf and Tom Lungley

- Somerset won the toss and elected to field.
- Somerset were set a revised target of 144 runs from 18 overs due to rain.

30 May 2022 (D/N)
Scorecard

Hampshire Hawks; 123 (20 overs)	v	Somerset; 124/6 (15.5 overs)
James Fuller 42 (28); Josh Davey 3/21 (4 overs)		Tom Lammonby 33 (22); James Fuller 2/23 (4 overs)

Somerset won by 4 wickets
Rose Bowl, Southampton
Umpires: James Middlebrook and Peter Hartley

- Somerset won the toss and elected to field.

31 May 2022 (D/N)
Scorecard

Surrey; 129 (15 overs)	v	Gloucestershire; 92 (15 overs)
Will Jacks 51 (33); Tom Smith 3/13 (2 overs)		Ryan Higgins 37 (30); Sam Curran 4/14 (3 overs)

Surrey won by 37 runs
The Oval, London
Umpires: Rob Bailey and Mike Burns

- Gloucestershire won the toss and elected to field.
- The match was reduced to 15 overs per side due to rain.

31 May 2022 (D/N)
Scorecard

Hampshire Hawks; 150/6 (20 overs)	v	Essex Eagles; 152/2 (13.5 overs)
Ben McDermott 38 (38); Sam Cook 2/16 (3 overs); Simon Harmer 2/16 (3 overs)		Michael Pepper 75* (42); Nathan Ellis 1/9 (2 overs)

Essex Eagles won by 8 wickets
County Ground, Chelmsford
Umpires: Chris Watts and Nigel Llong

- Essex Eagles won the toss and elected to field.

1 June 2022 (D/N)
Scorecard

Kent Spitfires; 114 (19.3 overs)	v	Gloucestershire; 116/4 (14.3 overs)
Jordan Cox 48 (47); David Payne 4/15 (4 overs)		Glenn Phillips 50* (31); Grant Stewart 2/14 (2 overs)

Gloucestershire won by 6 wickets
County Ground, Bristol
Umpires: Graham Lloyd and James Middlebrook
Player of the match: David Payne (Gloucestershire)

- Gloucestershire won the toss and elected to field.

1 June 2022 (D/N)
Scorecard

Sussex Sharks; 216/7 (20 overs)	v	Somerset; 169 (18.5 overs)
Josh Philippe 70 (43); Josh Davey 3/45 (4 overs)		Rilee Rossouw 74 (29); Obed McCoy 5/33 (4 overs)

Sussex Sharks won by 47 runs
County Ground, Taunton
Umpires: Nick Cook and Peter Hartley

- Somerset won the toss and elected to field.
- Obed McCoy (Sussex Sharks) took his first five-wicket haul in Twenty20 cricket.

2 June 2022 (D/N)
Scorecard

Surrey; 228/4 (20 overs)	v	Hampshire Hawks; 156 (18.5 overs)
Sam Curran 69 (38); Liam Dawson 3/34 (4 overs)		James Fuller 43 (34); Sam Curran 5/30 (4 overs)

Surrey won by 72 runs
The Oval, London
Umpires: Ben Debenham and Billy Taylor

- Hampshire Hawks won the toss and elected to field.
- Sam Curran (Surrey) took his first five-wicket haul in Twenty20 cricket.

2 June 2022 (D/N)
Scorecard

Essex Eagles; 113/9 (20 overs)	v	Glamorgan; 114/4 (16.5 overs)
Matt Critchley 38 (26); Michael Neser 3/13 (4 overs)		Sam Northeast 44 (44); Matt Critchley 1/17 (4 overs)

Glamorgan won by 6 wickets
Sophia Gardens, Cardiff
Umpires: Russell Warren and Alex Wharf
Player of the match: Michael Hogan (Glamorgan)

- Glamorgan won the toss and elected to field.

3 June 2022 (D/N)
Scorecard

Gloucestershire	v	Essex Eagles

Match abandoned
County Ground, Bristol
Umpires: Nick Cook and Peter Hartley

- No toss.
- No play was possible due to rain.

3 June 2022 (D/N)
Scorecard

Surrey; 159/6 (20 overs)	v	Kent Spitfires; 127/9 (20 overs)
Sam Curran 43 (34); Fred Klaassen 2/41 (4 overs)		Joe Denly 44 (46); Reece Topley 3/24 (4 overs)

Surrey won by 32 runs
St Lawrence Ground, Canterbury
Umpires: Billy Taylor and Neil Bainton

- Kent Spitfires won the toss and elected to field.

3 June 2022 (D/N)
Scorecard

Glamorgan; 173/7 (20 overs)	v	Somerset; 174/1 (14.1 overs)
Eddie Byrom 37 (26); Ben Green 5/29 (4 overs)		Will Smeed 94* (41); Prem Sisodiya 1/30 (3 overs)

Somerset won by 9 wickets
County Ground, Taunton
Umpires: Graham Lloyd and Mark Newell

- Somerset won the toss and elected to field.
- Ben Green (Somerset) took his first five-wicket haul in Twenty20 cricket.

3 June 2022 (D/N)
Scorecard

Middlesex; 163 (19.4 overs)	v	Sussex Sharks; 147/5 (16.3 overs)
Joe Cracknell 68 (49); Obed McCoy 4/30 (4 overs)		Ravi Bopara 54* (36); Toby Roland-Jones 2/40 (3 overs)

Sussex Sharks won by 5 wickets (DLS method)
County Ground, Hove
Umpires: Ben Debenham and Rob Bailey

- Sussex Sharks won the toss and elected to field.
- Sussex Sharks were set a revised target of 146 runs from 17 overs due to rain.
- Ali Orr (Sussex Sharks) made his T20 debut.

4 June 2022 (D/N)
Scorecard

Hampshire Hawks; 199/6 (20 overs)	v	Sussex Sharks; 177/6 (20 overs)
James Vince 65 (41); Henry Crocombe 3/31 (4 overs)		Tim Seifert 100* (56); Liam Dawson 1/17 (3 overs)

Hampshire Hawks won by 22 runs
Rose Bowl, Southampton
Umpires: Ian Blackwell and Billy Taylor
Player of the match: Tim Seifert (Sussex Sharks)

- Sussex Sharks won the toss and elected to field.

5 June 2022
Scorecard

Surrey; 160/9 (20 overs)	v	Glamorgan; 9/0 (1.3 overs)
Jamie Overton 48 (21); Marnus Labuschagne 2/27 (4 overs)		David Lloyd 7* (7)

No result
Sophia Gardens, Cardiff
Umpires: Alex Wharf and Nick Cook

- Glamorgan won the toss and elected to field.
- Rain prevented any further play.

5 June 2022
Scorecard

Kent Spitfires; 192/8 (20 overs)	v	Middlesex; 137/8 (20 overs)
Joe Denly 110 (58); Chris Green 3/29 (4 overs)		Stephen Eskinazi 30 (24); Jack Leaning 3/30 (4 overs)

Kent Spitfires won by 55 runs
St Lawrence Ground, Canterbury
Umpires: Rob Bailey and Ben Debenham

- Kent Spitfires won the toss and elected to bat.
- Toby Greatwood (Middlesex) made his T20 debut.

7 June 2022
Scorecard

Middlesex; 142/7 (20 overs)	v	Hampshire Hawks; 145/1 (12 overs)
Max Holden 35 (29); Liam Dawson 3/14 (4 overs)		Ben McDermott 83 (30); Martin Andersson 1/30 (2 overs)

Hampshire Hawks won by 9 wickets
Radlett Cricket Club, Radlett
Umpires: Nick Cook and Steve O'Shaughnessy

- Hampshire Hawks won the toss and elected to field.

7 June 2022 (D/N)
Scorecard

Glamorgan; 158/8 (20 overs)	v	Gloucestershire; 159/5 (19 overs)
David Lloyd 68 (43); Glenn Phillips 2/22 (3 overs)		James Bracey 63 (49); Dan Douthwaite 3/30 (4 overs)

Gloucestershire won by 5 wickets
Sophia Gardens, Cardiff
Umpires: Ian Blackwell and Neil Mallender

- Gloucestershire won the toss and elected to field.

7 June 2022 (D/N)
Scorecard

Kent Spitfires; 130/9 (20 overs)	v	Essex Eagles; 135/3 (15.3 overs)
Alex Blake 38 (32); Sam Cook 2/14 (4 overs)		Michael Pepper 50 (29); Fred Klaassen 1/20 (4 overs)

Essex Eagles won by 7 wickets
County Cricket Ground, Chelmsford
Umpires: David Millns and Paul Pollard

- Essex Eagles won the toss and elected to field.
- Tawanda Muyeye (Kent Spitfires) made his T20 debut.

8 June 2022 (D/N)
Scorecard

Sussex Sharks; 146/7 (20 overs)	v	Surrey; 147/3 (16.3 overs)
Fynn Hudson-Prentice 49* (44); Chris Jordan 2/23 (4 overs)		Will Jacks 57 (37); Obed McCoy 2/17 (3.3 overs)

Surrey won by 7 wickets
The Oval, London
Umpires: Neil Pratt and Martin Saggers

- Surrey won the toss and elected to field.

9 June 2022 (D/N)
Scorecard

Surrey; 208/7 (20 overs)	v	Middlesex; 188/8 (20 overs)
Jason Roy 81 (45); Martin Andersson 2/32 (4 overs)		Stephen Eskinazi 47 (21); Chris Jordan 4/31 (4 overs)

Surrey won by 20 runs
Lord's, London
Umpires: David Millns and Paul Pollard
Player of the match: Jason Roy (Surrey)

- Middlesex won the toss and elected to field.

9 June 2022 (D/N)
Scorecard

Gloucestershire; 101/5 (10 overs)	v	Somerset; 114/7 (9.3 overs)
Miles Hammond 29 (12); Lewis Gregory 1/5 (1 over)		Roelof van der Merwe 48 (15); Josh Shaw 2/20 (2 overs)

Somerset won by 3 wickets (DLS method)
County Ground, Bristol
Umpires: Paul Baldwin and Neil Mallender

- Somerset won the toss and elected to field.
- Somerset were set a revised target of 112 runs from 10 overs due to rain.

9 June 2022 (D/N)
Scorecard

Hampshire Hawks; 155/6 (20 overs)	v	Essex Eagles; 123 (19.1 overs)
James Vince 44 (39); Matt Critchley 3/25 (4 overs)		Paul Walter 27 (24); James Fuller 4/30 (4 overs)

Hampshire Hawks won by 32 runs
Rose Bowl, Southampton
Umpires: Ben Debenham and Steve O'Shaughnessy

- Hampshire Hawks won the toss and elected to bat.

10 June 2022 (D/N)
Scorecard

Hampshire Hawks; 134/4 (20 overs)	v	Glamorgan; 125 (19.5 overs)
Joe Weatherley 46* (36); Andrew Salter 2/18 (4 overs)		Sam Northeast 36 (40); Brad Wheal 5/38 (3.5 overs)

Hampshire Hawks won by 9 runs
Sophia Gardens, Cardiff
Umpires: Paul Baldwin and Neil Mallender

- Glamorgan won the toss and elected to field.

10 June 2022 (D/N)
Scorecard

Kent Spitfires; 202/7 (20 overs)	v	Somerset; 170/9 (20 overs)
Jordan Cox 94 (47); Craig Overton 3/31 (4 overs)		Tom Abell 43 (31); Fred Klaassen 2/26 (4 overs)

Kent Spitfires won by 32 runs
County Ground, Taunton
Umpires: Hassan Adnan and Russell Warren

- Somerset won the toss and elected to field.

10 June 2022 (D/N)
Scorecard

Gloucestershire; 145/6 (20 overs)	v	Sussex Sharks; 141 (19.4 overs)
Glenn Phillips 66 (53); Obed McCoy 2/36 (4 overs)		Tom Alsop 82 (52); David Payne 3/17 (3.4 overs)

Gloucestershire won by 4 runs
County Ground, Hove
Umpires: Richard Kettleborough and Steve O'Shaughnessy
Player of the match: Glenn Phillips (Gloucestershire)

- Sussex Sharks won the toss and elected to field.

10 June 2022 (D/N)
Scorecard

Essex Eagles; 186/6 (20 overs)	v	Middlesex; 125 (18.2 overs)
Feroze Khushi 67 (40); Martin Andersson 3/42 (4 overs)		Joe Cracknell 29 (28); Sam Cook 3/18 (3 overs)

Essex Eagles won by 61 runs
County Ground, Chelmsford
Umpires: Neil Bainton and Tom Lungley

- Middlesex won the toss and elected to field.

17 June 2022 (D/N)
Scorecard

Middlesex; 155/8 (20 overs)	v	Surrey; 158/3 (15.1 overs)
Luke Hollman 31 (28); Sunil Narine 2/27 (4 overs); Chris Jordan 2/27 (4 overs)		Sunil Narine 51* (29); Thilan Walallawita 1/7 (1 over)

Surrey won by 7 wickets
The Oval, London
Umpires: Martin Saggers and Rob White
Player of the match: Sunil Narine (Surrey)

- Surrey won the toss and elected to field.

17 June 2022 (D/N)
Scorecard

Somerset; 184/6 (20 overs)	v	Gloucestershire; 177/8 (20 overs)
Lewis Gregory 58* (35); Mohammad Amir 2/25 (4 overs)		Ryan Higgins 43 (29); Peter Siddle 3/30 (4 overs)

Somerset won by 7 runs
County Ground, Taunton
Umpires: Paul Pollard and Billy Taylor

- Gloucestershire won the toss and elected to field.

17 June 2022 (D/N)
Scorecard

Essex Eagles; 244/7 (20 overs)	v	Sussex Sharks; 233/6 (20 overs)
Daniel Sams 71 (24); Steven Finn 2/45 (3.1 overs)		Mohammad Rizwan 66 (32); Matt Critchley 2/37 (4 overs)

Essex Eagles won by 11 runs
County Ground, Chelmsford
Umpires: Paul Baldwin and Steve O'Shaughnessy

- Sussex Sharks won the toss and elected to field.

17 June 2022 (D/N)
Scorecard

Hampshire Hawks; 221/3 (20 overs)	v	Kent Spitfires; 167/8 (20 overs)
James Vince 100 (54); Grant Stewart 2/47 (4 overs)		Joe Denly 49 (37); Chris Wood 2/26 (4 overs); Nathan Ellis 2/26 (4 overs)

Hampshire Hawks won by 54 runs
Rose Bowl, Southampton
Umpires: Richard Kettleborough and Mark Newell

- Kent Spitfires won the toss and elected to field.

18 June 2022 (D/N)
Scorecard

Glamorgan	v	Gloucestershire

No result
County Ground, Bristol
Umpires: David Millns and Hassan Adnan

- Gloucestershire won the toss and elected to field.
- No play was possible due to rain.
- Alex Horton (Glamorgan) made his T20 debut.

19 June 2022
Scorecard

Essex Eagles; 188/5 (20 overs)	v	Somerset; 194/2 (17.3 overs)
Michael Pepper 86* (49); Jack Brooks 2/23 (4 overs)		Rilee Rossouw 85* (36); Daniel Sams 1/29 (4 overs)

Somerset won by 8 wickets
County Ground, Chelmsford
Umpires: Nigel Llong and Martin Saggers

- Somerset won the toss and elected to field.

19 June 2022
Scorecard

Sussex Sharks; 149/8 (20 overs)	v	Glamorgan; 151/6 (19 overs)
Luke Wright 46 (35); Michael Neser 3/24 (4 overs)		Colin Ingram 57 (43); Tymal Mills 3/30 (4 overs)

Glamorgan won by 4 wickets
Sophia Gardens, Cardiff
Umpires: Paul Baldwin and Russell Warren

- Glamorgan won the toss and elected to field.

19 June 2022
Scorecard

Hampshire Hawks; 151/7 (20 overs)	v	Surrey; 152/6 (19.1 overs)
James Fuller 34 (20); Jamie Overton 2/21 (3 overs)		Kieron Pollard 34 (22); Liam Dawson 2/21 (4 overs)

Surrey won by 4 wickets
Rose Bowl, Southampton
Umpires: Billy Taylor and Alex Wharf

- Surrey won the toss and elected to field.

19 June 2022
Scorecard

Kent Spitfires; 141/9 (20 overs)	v	Middlesex; 143/3 (17.3 overs)
Sam Billings 29 (33); Chris Green 2/18 (4 overs)		John Simpson 46 (35); Fred Klaassen 2/43 (3.3 overs)

Middlesex won by 7 wickets
Lord's, London
Umpires: Rob Bailey and Neil Pratt

- Kent Spitfires won the toss and elected to bat.

21 June 2022 (D/N)
Scorecard

Middlesex; 171/7 (20 overs)	v	Glamorgan; 172/2 (14.2 overs)
Max Holden 58 (51); Michael Hogan 3/28 (4 overs)		Sam Northeast 89 (46); Jason Behrendorff 1/22 (3 overs)

Glamorgan won by 8 wickets
Sophia Gardens, Cardiff
Umpires: Billy Taylor and Ian Blackwell

- Glamorgan won the toss and elected to field.

21 June 2022 (D/N)
Scorecard

Somerset; 144/8 (20 overs)	v	Surrey; 145/7 (20 overs)
Tom Banton 39 (25); Conor McKerr 2/19 (3 overs)		Will Jacks 66* (58); Lewis Gregory 3/25 (4 overs)

Surrey won by 3 wickets
The Oval, London
Umpires: Mike Burns and Neil Bainton

- Surrey won the toss and elected to field.
- Nico Reifer (Surrey) made his T20 debut.

21 June 2022 (D/N)
Scorecard

Gloucestershire; 195/4 (20 overs)	v	Kent Spitfires; 190/5 (20 overs)
Ian Cockbain 64 (46); Joe Denly 1/16 (2.1 overs)		Jack Leaning 37* (18); Mohammad Amir 2/30 (4 overs)

Gloucestershire won by 5 runs
St Lawrence Ground, Canterbury
Umpires: Nigel Llong and Tom Lungley

- Kent Spitfires won the toss and elected to field.
- Jas Singh (Kent Spitfires) made his T20 debut.

23 June 2022 (D/N)
Scorecard

Essex Eagles; 161/6 (20 overs)	v	Middlesex; 140/8 (20 overs)
Tom Westley 50 (41); Chris Green 3/16 (3 overs)		Stephen Eskinazi 43 (38); Sam Cook 3/23 (4 overs)

Essex Eagles won by 21 runs
Lord's, London
Umpires: Chris Watts and Neil Mallender

- Middlesex won the toss and elected to field.

23 June 2022 (D/N)
Scorecard

Sussex Sharks; 172/5 (20 overs)	v	Surrey; 155 (18.2 overs)
Mohammad Rizwan 48 (32); Gus Atkinson 2/17 (3 overs)		Will Jacks 76 (48); Tymal Mills 2/22 (3.2 overs)

Sussex Sharks won by 17 runs
County Ground, Hove
Umpires: Mark Newell and Nigel Llong

- Surrey won the toss and elected to field.

23 June 2022 (D/N)
Scorecard

Hampshire Hawks; 208/5 (20 overs)	v	Somerset; 194/9 (20 overs)
James Vince 129* (62); Peter Siddle 2/31 (4 overs)		Rilee Rossouw 55 (28); Chris Wood 2/26 (4 overs)

Hampshire Hawks won by 14 runs
County Ground, Taunton
Umpires: Mike Burns and James Middlebrook
Player of the match: James Vince (Hampshire Hawks)

- Somerset won the toss and elected to field.

24 June 2022 (D/N)
Scorecard

Somerset; 75/6 (7 overs)	v	Glamorgan; 59/5 (7 overs)
Tom Abell 26 (14); Michael Neser 3/19 (2 overs)		Colin Ingram 37* (19); Ben Green 2/13 (2 overs)

Somerset won by 16 runs
Sophia Gardens, Cardiff
Umpires: Paul Baldwin and Paul Pollard

- Glamorgan won the toss and elected to field.
- The match was reduced to 7 overs per side due to rain.

24 June 2022 (D/N)
Scorecard

Hampshire Hawks; 178/7 (20 overs)	v	Gloucestershire; 169/7 (20 overs)
Ben McDermott 50 (38); Ryan Higgins 3/24 (3 overs)		James Bracey 40 (26); James Fuller 2/23 (4 overs)

Hampshire Hawks won by 9 runs
County Ground, Bristol
Umpires: Ian Blackwell and Rob White

- Gloucestershire won the toss and elected to field.

24 June 2022 (D/N)
Scorecard

Essex Eagles; 198/7 (20 overs)	v	Surrey; 155/9 (20 overs)
Paul Walter 49 (33); Reece Topley 4/37 (4 overs)		Rory Burns 37 (26); Aaron Beard 4/29 (4 overs)

Essex Eagles won by 43 runs
County Cricket Ground, Chelmsford
Umpires: Graham Lloyd and James Middlebrook

- Surrey won the toss and elected to field.
- Tom Lawes (Surrey) made his T20 debut.

24 June 2022 (D/N)
Scorecard

Sussex Sharks; 158/8 (20 overs)	v	Kent Spitfires; 159/4 (18.5 overs)
Ali Orr 36 (25); Grant Stewart 3/38 (4 overs)		Joe Denly 58 (39); Henry Crocombe 1/19 (2 overs)

Kent Spitfires won by 6 wickets
St Lawrence Ground, Canterbury
Umpires: Chris Watts and Mark Newell

- Kent Spitfires won the toss and elected to field.

1 July 2022 (D/N)
Scorecard

Middlesex; 160/6 (20 overs)	v	Somerset; 161/8 (19.4 overs)
Chris Green 44* (24); Ben Green 3/38 (4 overs)		Tom Banton 39 (28); Jason Behrendorff 3/30 (4 overs)

Somerset won by 2 wickets
Lord's, London
Umpires: James Middlebrook and Martin Saggers

- Somerset won the toss and elected to field.
- Max Harris (Middlesex) made his T20 debut.

1 July 2022 (D/N)
Scorecard

Kent Spitfires; 191/5 (20 overs)	v	Surrey; 195/6 (18.3 overs)
Jordan Cox 54 (31); Jamie Overton 1/24 (4 overs)		Jason Roy 58 (27); Qais Ahmad 3/28 (4 overs)

Surrey won by 4 wickets
The Oval, London
Umpires: Nick Cook and Chris Watts

- Surrey won the toss and elected to field.

1 July 2022 (D/N)
Scorecard

Hampshire Hawks; 140/7 (20 overs)	v	Gloucestershire; 125 (19.4 overs)
James Fuller 45 (24); Tom Smith 2/18 (4 overs)		James Bracey 38 (30); Liam Dawson 2/16 (4 overs)

Hampshire Hawks won by 15 runs
Rose Bowl, Southampton
Umpires: Mike Burns and Graham Lloyd
Player of the match: James Fuller (Hampshire Hawks)

- Hampshire Hawks won the toss and elected to bat.

1 July 2022 (D/N)
Scorecard

Essex Eagles; 197/8 (20 overs)	v	Sussex Sharks; 169/8 (20 overs)
Adam Rossington 95 (50); Rashid Khan 3/30 (4 overs)		Ravi Bopara 47 (28); Simon Harmer 3/18 (4 overs)

Essex Eagles won by 28 runs
County Ground, Hove
Umpires: Hassan Adnan and Rob White

- Sussex Sharks won the toss and elected to field.

2 July 2022 (D/N)
Scorecard

Essex Eagles; 254/5 (20 overs)	v	Glamorgan; 185/7 (20 overs)
Dan Lawrence 71 (37); Jamie McIlroy 2/32 (4 overs)		Sam Northeast 97* (56); Daniel Sams 3/20 (4 overs)

Essex Eagles won by 69 runs
County Ground, Chelmsford
Umpires: Rob Bailey and Ben Debenham
Player of the match: Dan Lawrence (Essex Eagles)

- Glamorgan won the toss and elected to field.
- Jamie McIlroy and Thomas Bevan (Glamorgan) both made their T20 debut.

3 July 2022
Scorecard

Middlesex; 163/4 (20 overs)	v	Gloucestershire; 164/5 (19.5 overs)
Stephen Eskinazi 65* (55); Glenn Phillips 1/7 (1 over)		Glenn Phillips 52 (39); Max Harris 2/26 (3 overs)

Gloucestershire won by 5 wickets
County Ground, Bristol
Umpires: Graham Lloyd and Paul Baldwin

- Middlesex won the toss and elected to bat.

3 July 2022 (D/N)
Scorecard

Glamorgan; 190/5 (20 overs)	v	Kent Spitfires; 155 (17.2 overs)
Dan Douthwaite 51* (23); Qais Ahmad 2/36 (4 overs)		Darren Stevens 34 (22); Jamie McIlroy 3/31 (3 overs)

Glamorgan won by 35 runs
St Lawrence Ground, Canterbury
Umpires: Neil Bainton and Mark Newell

- Glamorgan won the toss and elected to bat.

3 July 2022 (D/N)
Scorecard

Sussex Sharks; 180/8 (20 overs)	v	Hampshire Hawks; 181/5 (19.1 overs)
George Garton 37 (17); Mason Crane 2/23 (4 overs)		James Vince 65 (42); Rashid Khan 2/24 (4 overs)

Hampshire Hawks won by 5 wickets
County Ground, Hove
Umpires: Mike Burns and Rob White

- Hampshire Hawks won the toss and elected to field.
- Tom Haines (Sussex Sharks) made his T20 debut.

3 July 2022 (D/N)
Scorecard

Somerset; 218/8 (20 overs)	v	Surrey; 171 (18.1 overs)
Will Smeed 98 (51); Chris Jordan 3/38 (3 overs)		Chris Jordan 73 (35); Craig Overton 4/25 (4 overs)

Somerset won by 47 runs
County Ground, Taunton
Umpires: Richard Illingworth and Tom Lungley

- Surrey won the toss and elected to field.

== Knock-out stage ==
The ECB confirmed the following fixtures for the knock-out stage of the tournament.

Quarter-finals
S1	Surrey	159/7
N4	Yorkshire Vikings	160/5
N2	Lancashire Lightning	162/3
S3	Essex Eagles	161/5
N1	Birmingham Bears	82
S4	Hampshire Hawks	186/6
S2	Somerset	265/5
N3	Derbyshire Falcons	74

Semi-finals
QF1	Yorkshire Vikings	204/7
QF3	Lancashire Lightning	208/4
QF2	Hampshire Hawks	190/6
QF4	Somerset	153

Final
SF1	Lancashire Lightning	151/8
SF2	Hampshire Hawks	152/8

=== Quarter-finals ===
Quarter-final 1
6 July 2022
18:30 (D/N)
Scorecard

Yorkshire Vikings; 160/5 (20 overs)	v	Surrey; 159/7 (20 overs)
Tom Kohler-Cadmore 62 (48); Gus Atkinson 3/25 (4 overs)		Jamie Overton 40 (21); David Willey 2/26 (4 overs)

Yorkshire Vikings won by 1 run
The Oval, London
Umpires: Richard Illingworth and Russell Warren
Player of the match: Tom Kohler-Cadmore (Yorkshire Vikings)

- Surrey won the toss and elected to field.

Quarter-final 2
7 July 2022
18:30 (D/N)
Scorecard

Hampshire Hawks; 186/6 (20 overs)	v	Birmingham Bears; 82 (13.3 overs)
Ben McDermott 61 (36); Carlos Brathwaite 4/30 (4 overs)		Adam Hose 16 (19); James Fuller 4/17 (4 overs)

Hampshire Hawks won by 104 runs
Edgbaston, Birmingham
Umpires: Tom Lungley and Graham Lloyd

- Hampshire Hawks won the toss and elected to bat.

Quarter-final 3
8 July 2022
18:30 (D/N)
Scorecard

Essex Eagles; 161/5 (20 overs)	v	Lancashire Lightning; 162/3 (15.4 overs)
Michael Pepper 36 (28); Luke Wood 2/28 (4 overs)		Steven Croft 76* (48); Simon Harmer 1/29 (3.4 overs)

Lancashire Lightning won by 7 wickets
Old Trafford, Manchester
Umpires: Ian Blackwell and Nigel Llong
Player of the match: Steven Croft (Lancashire Lightning)

- Essex Eagles won the toss and elected to bat.

Quarter-final 4
9 July 2022
19:00 (N)
Scorecard

Somerset; 265/5 (20 overs)	v	Derbyshire Falcons; 74 (11.2 overs)
Rilee Rossouw 93 (36); George Scrimsahaw 2/16 (4 overs)		Wayne Madsen 14 (17); Peter Siddle 3/10 (2 overs)

Somerset won by 191 runs
County Ground, Taunton
Umpires: Ben Debenham and Neil Mallender
Player of the match: Rilee Rossouw (Somerset)

- Derbyshire Falcons won the toss and elected to field.
- Highest ever score in the T20 Blast. Biggest margin of victory in the T20 Blast.

== Finals Day ==
=== Semi-finals ===
Semi-final 1
16 July 2022
11:00
Scorecard

Yorkshire Vikings; 204/7 (20 overs)	v	Lancashire Lightning; 208/4 (18.4 overs)
Tom Kohler-Cadmore 66 (44); Luke Wells 2/32 (3 overs)		Keaton Jennings 75 (41); Matt Revis 2/36 (1.4 overs)

Lancashire Lightning won by 6 wickets
Edgbaston, Birmingham
Umpires: Neil Mallender and David Millns
Player of the match: Keaton Jennings (Lancashire Lightning)

- Yorkshire Vikings won the toss and elected to bat.

Semi-final 2
16 July 2022
14:30
Scorecard

Hampshire Hawks; 190/6 (20 overs)	v	Somerset; 153 (19.3 overs)
Tom Prest 64 (46); Lewis Goldsworthy 2/24 (2 overs)		Tom Lammonby 34 (27); Nathan Ellis 3/30 (3.3 overs)

Hampshire Hawks won by 37 runs
Edgbaston, Birmingham
Umpires: Graham Lloyd and Neil Mallender
Player of the match: Tom Prest (Hampshire Hawks)

- Hampshire Hawks won the toss and elected to bat.

=== Final ===
16 July 2022
18:45 (N)
Scorecard

Hampshire Hawks; 152/8 (20 overs)	v	Lancashire Lightning; 151/8 (20 overs)
Ben McDermott 62 (36); Matt Parkinson 4/26 (4 overs)		Steven Croft 36 (25); James Fuller 2/19 (3 overs)

Hampshire Hawks won by 1 run
Edgbaston, Birmingham
Umpires: Graham Lloyd and David Millns
Player of the match: Ben McDermott (Hampshire Hawks)

- Hampshire Hawks won the toss and elected to bat.
