= Harry Finch (cricketer) =

English cricketer (born 1995)

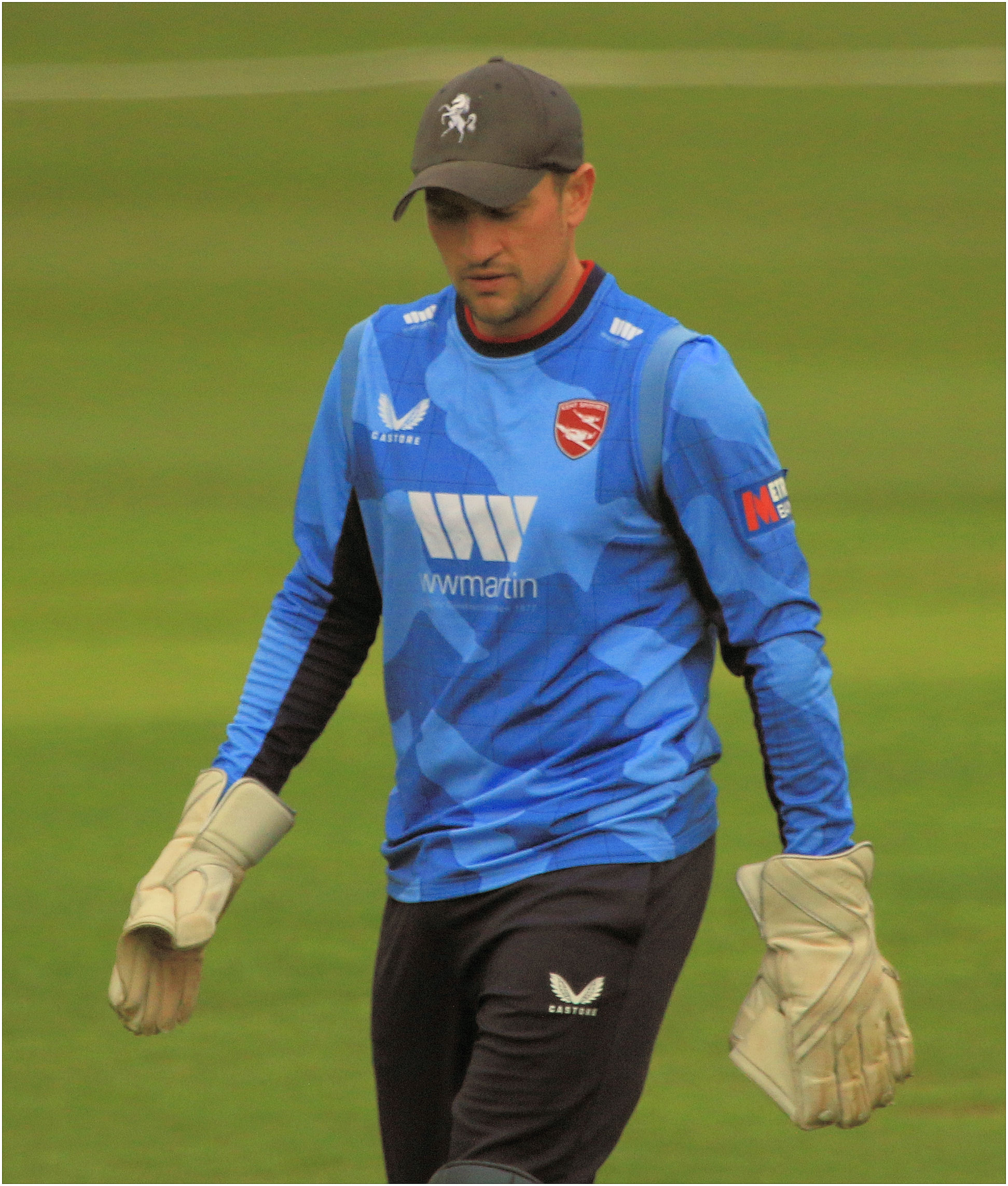
- Finch in 2023

Personal information
- Full name: Harry Zacariah Finch
- Born: 10 February 1995 (age 31); Hastings, East Sussex, England
- Batting: Right-handed
- Bowling: Right-arm medium-fast
- Role: Batsman-wicket-keeper
- Relatives: Jason Finch (father)

Domestic team information
- Years: Team
- 2013–2020: Sussex (squad no. 6)
- 2021–: Kent (squad no. 72)
- FC debut: 3 September 2013 Sussex v Durham
- LA debut: 20 May 2013 Sussex v Netherlands

Career statistics
Competition	FC	LA	T20
Matches	89	82	51
Runs scored	3,999	2,432	806
Batting average	27.77	34.25	23.70
100s/50s	6/24	2/16	0/3
Top score	135*	108	64*
Balls bowled	168	16	–
Wickets	2	0	–
Bowling average	59.00	–	–
5 wickets in innings	0	–	–
10 wickets in match	0	–	–
Best bowling	1/9	–	–
Catches/stumpings	127/10	48/5	28/–
- Source: Cricinfo, 27 September 2026

Harry Zacariah Finch (born 10 February 1995) is an English cricketer who plays for Kent County Cricket Club. He is a right-handed Wicket Keeper batsman who bowls right-arm medium-fast. Finch played for Sussex between 2013 and 2020 before signing for Kent in 2021, initially on a short-term contract.

== Early life and education ==
Finch was born at Hastings in Sussex in 1995 and was educated at St Richard's Catholic College in Bexhill-on-Sea and Eastbourne College. His father, Jason, played for Sussex's Second XI and List A and Minor Counties Trophy cricket for Sussex Cricket Board.

== Career ==
Finch was part of age-group teams at Sussex from the age of 10 and made his senior debut in a List A match against the Netherlands on 20 May 2013. He was released by Sussex at the end of the 2020 season and played for Kent's Second XI during the early months of the 2021 season. He scored his maiden Championship hundred against Middlesex at Hove in 2018 playing for Sussex.

He made his senior debut for Kent following a member of the county's First XI squad testing positive for COVID-19 which required the players involved in the county's previous match to all self-isolate. As a result, a number of Second XI players or "homegrown prospects" were drafted into the squad and made their senior debuts for the county.

On 10 August 2022, Finch re-joined Kent for the remainder of the One-Day Cup as cover for a number of players absent due to injuries and The Hundred. He has also played Australian Grade cricket for Yarraville Cricket Club.

Finch was instrumental in pushing Kent for T20 Blast Quarterfinal in 2025 after scoring 64 from 34 balls. In January 2026, he signed a new contract tying him into the club until at least the end of the 2027 season.
