= Alan Bush discography =

This is a discography of the recorded music of the British composer and pianist Alan Bush. The chief sources for the listing are (a) Lewis Foreman's discography published as an appendix in Nancy Bush's Alan Bush:Music Politics and Life, in which the earlier (mainly 78rpm and LP) recordings appear, and (b) the Alan Bush Music Trust, founded in 1997 two years after the composer's death, which maintains and updates a list of recordings on its website.

There are a number of performances of Bush's work available on YouTube, including Symphonies 1, 2 and 4, the Piano Concerto, Dance Overture, the Symphonic Movement "Africa", Variations, Nocturne and Finale, the Scherzo for Wind Orchestra, the Fantasia on Soviet Themes and other works.

== Table 1: 78rpm and LP issues ==
Year of rec. or /issue	Works	Performers	Label
n/a	Dialectic for String Quartet Op. 15 (1929)	Aeolian String Quartet	(78 rpm) Decca K 1852/3
n/a	"The Internationale" arr. for SATB choir (1948)	Topic Singers	(78 rpm) Topic TRC1
n/a	"The Internationale" arr. for SATB choir (1948) †"The Red Flag" (Note: The † sign against this and other works indicates that they are not included in the "list of works" provided in N. Bush 2000, which states that "shorter workers' songs for the WMA are not listed".)	Centenary Choir	(78 rpm) Topic TRC23
n/a	†"The People Sing" arr. for SATB and two pianos	Topic Singers; Mary and Geraldine Peppin (pianos)	(78 rpm) Topic TRC7
n/a	†"Truth on the March" for chorus and piano	Michael Percival (piano); Topic Singers cond. Alan Bush	(78 rpm) Topic TRC10
n/a	"Song to Labour" for chorus and piano (1926)	London Labour Choral Union, cond. Alan Bush	(78 rpm) Unity
n/a	Ballads of the Sea No. 1: "The Cruel Sea Captain" Op. 50 (1957–58); Three Concert Studies for piano trio Op. 31 (1927); Corentyne Kwe-Kwe: Toccata Op. 76 (1972) †Two Spanish Songs for cello and piano	Alan Bush (piano); David Parkhouse, Hugh Bean, Eileen Crawford; Alan Bush (piano); B. Rickelmann (cello); Alan Bush (piano	(LP) ArgoZRG 749
n/a	Dialectic for String Quartet Op. 15 (1929); Six Short Piano Pieces Op. 99 (1980–83); Violin Concerto Op. 32 (1946–48)	Medici String Quartet; Alan Bush piano Manoug Parikian (violin); BBC Symphony Orchestra cond. Norman Del Mar	(LP) Hyperion A66138
n/a	Equisse: Le Quartorze Juillet Op. 38 (1943)	Eric Parkin (piano)	(LP) DBRD 2006
1963	Overture: Festal Day Op. 23 (1942); Symphony No. 2: "Nottingham Op. 33 (1949)	USSR State Orchestra cond. Alan Bush	(LP) Melodiya D012687/90
n/a	Nocturne Op. 46 (1956); 24 Preludes Op. 84 (1977)	Peter Jacobs (piano)	(LP) Altarus AIR2-90004
n/a	†"Rise Up Now Ye Shepherds " arr. for SATB and two pianos	Elizabethan Singers, cond. Louis Halsey	(LP) LP27710
n/a	Variations, Nocturne and Finale on an English Sea Song Op. 60 (1962)	David Wilde (piano); Royal Philharmonic Orchestra cond. John Snashall	(LP) Pye Golden Guinea GGC 4073
n/a	Voices of the Prophets Op. 41 (1953)	Peter Pears (tenor); Alan Bush (piano)	(LP) Argo ZRG 5439 reissued as ZK 28–9

== Table 2: CD recordings ==
Year of issue	CD identification	Works	Performers	Label
1984	"Alan Bush – Piano Music"	Nocturne Op. 46 (1956); Corentyne Kwe-Kwe: Toccata Op.76 (1972); Letter Galliard Op. 80 (1974); Twenty-four preludes Op. 84 (1977)	Peter Jacobs (piano)	Altarus AIR-CD-9004, Heritage HTGCD406
1989	"Works for Piano Trio"	Three Concert Studies for piano, violin and cello Op. 31 (1947)	Barbican Trio	ASV ZCDCA646
1994	"Music by Alan Bush"	Relinquishment for piano Op. 11 (1928); Lyric Interlude for solo violin with piano Op. 26 (1944); English Suite for String Orchestra Op. 28 (1946); Voices of the Prophets: cantata for tenor and piano Op. 41(1953); Nocturne for piano Op. 46 (1956)	Piers Lane (piano), Clio Gould (violin), Sophie Rahman (piano), Northern Chamber Orchestra cond. Nicholas Ward, Philip Langridge (tenor), Lionel Friend (piano)	Redcliffe Recordings RR008
1997	"British String Quartets: Bridge, Bush, Wesley"	Dialectic for String Quartet Op. 15 (1929)	Bochmann String Quartet – Michael Bochmann (violin), Mark Messenger (violin), Helen Roberts (viola), Peter Adams (cello)	Redcliff Recordings RR013
2000	"Alan Bush: The Complete Organ Works"	Three English Song Preludes Op. 40 (1952); Two Occasional Pieces Op. 56 (1960); Prelude and Concert Piece Op. 116 (1986); Suite for organ Op. 117 (1986); Sonata for organ Op. 118 (1987)	Robert Crowley (organ)	Pipework SCS655
2000	"To All A Future World May Hold – Song Cycles by Alan Bush "	Voices of the Prophets Op. 41 (1953); Four Seafarers' Songs for baritone Op. 57 (1961); Life's Span – song cycle for mezzo-soprano Op. 79 (1973); Woman's Life – song cycle for soprano Op. 87 (1977)	The Artsong Collective – Richard Black (piano), Wills Morgan (tenor), Paul Wilson (baritone), Phillida Bannister (mezzo-soprano), Moira Harris (soprano)	Musaeus MZCD102
2002	"Alan Bush: Chamber Music Volume 1"	Three Concert Studies for piano, violin and cello Op. 31 (1947); Two Easy Pieces for cello and piano (1951); Two Melodies for viola with pianoforte Op. 47 (1957); Sonatina for viola and piano Op. 88 (1978); Concert Piece for cello and piano Op. 17 (1936); Summer Valley for cello and piano Op. 125 (1986)	Summerhayes Piano Trio – Adam Summerhayes (violin/viola), Catherine Summerhayes (piano), Joseph Spooner (cello)	Meridian Records CDE 84458
2002	"Alan Bush"	Violin Concerto Op. 32 1946–48; Six Short Pieces for piano Op. 99 (1980–83); Dialectic for String Quartet Op. 15 (1929)	BBC Symphony Orchestra cond. Norman Del Mar. Manoug Parikian (violin); Alan Bush (piano); Medici String Quartet: Paul Robertson (violin), David Mathews (violin), Ivo-Jan van der Werff (viola), Anthony Lewis (cello)	Claudio Records CB 5151–2
2003	"Alan Bush Chamber Music"	Quartet for strings and piano Op. 5 (1924–25); Phantasy for violin and piano op. 3 (1923); Sonata for cello and piano Op. 120 (1987); Three Contrapuntal Studies for violin and viola op. 13 (1931)	The London Piano Quartet: Norma Liddell (violin), Elizabeth Turnbull (viola), David Kenedy (cello), Philip Fowke (piano)	Dutton Vocalion CDLX 7130
2003	"Pages from the Swallow Book: Prison Cycle"	Prison Cycle for mezzo-soprano and piano	Alison Wells (soprano), Keith Swallow (piano)	Campion Cameo CAMEO2021
2003	"British String Quartets"	Suite of Six for String Quartet Op. 81 (1975)	Bochmann String Quartet – Michael Bochmann (violin), Mark Messenger (violin), Helen Roberts (viola), Peter Adams (cello)	Redcliff Recordings RR020
2004	"Alan Bush: Chamber Music Volume 2"	Meditation on a German Song of 1848 for solo violin and string orchestra Op. 22 (1941); Esquisse: Le Quartorze Juillet Op. 38 (1943); Lyric Interlude for violin and piano Op. 26 (1944); Three Rậga Melodies for unaccompanied violin Op. 59 (1961); Two Preludes and Fugues for violin and piano Op. 108 (1986); Serenade and Duet for violin and piano Op. 111 (1986); Song and Dance for violin and piano Op. 117a (1986)	Adam Summerhayes (violin), Catherine Summerhayes (piano)	Meridian Records CDE 84481
2004	"Alan Bush: Symphonies 1 and 2"	Symphony No. 1 in C Op. 21 (1939–40); Symphony No. 2: "The Nottingham Symphony" Op. 33 (1939)	Royal Northern College of Music Symphony Orchestra, Douglas Bostock (conductor), Weimin Zheng (violin), Ella Brinch (viola), Clare Gallant (cello), Paul Vowles (clarinet)	Classico Records CLASSCD 484
2005	"The Best of British Volume 2"	Scherzo for wind orchestra with percussion Op. 68 (1969)	Royal Tokyo Kosei Wind Orchestra cond. Douglas Bostock	Kosei Publishing Co. KOCD 8012
2005	"The Best of British Volume 3"	Dance Overture for Military Band Op. 12 (1930)	Royal Tokyo Kosei Wind Orchestra cond. Douglas Bostock	Kosei Publishing Co. KOCD 8013
2006	"Tame Cat and other Songs by British Composers"	"The Weaving Song" from Woman's Life – Song cycle for soprano and piano Op. 87 (1977)	Sylvia Eaves (soprano), Thea King (clarinet), Courtney Kenny (piano)	Cameo Classics C-C9020CD
2007	"The British Double Bass"	Meditation and Scherzo for double bass and piano Op. 93/2 (1980)	Leon Bosch (double bass), Sung-Suk Kang (piano), I Musicanti	Meridian CDE 84550
2007	"Mark Bebbington – Piano"	Piano Sonata in B minor Op. 2 (1921)	Mark Bebbington (piano)	Somm Recordings SOMMCD 069
2007	"The British Quartet"	String Quartet in A minor Op. 4 (1923)	New World Quartet – Andy Long (violin), Susie Gibbon (violin), Rachel Jones (viola), Zoe Long (cello)	Campion Cameo CAMEO 2071
2008	"Rawsthorne, Berkeley, Bush – Chamber Music"	Three Concert Studies for piano, violin and cello Op. 31 (1947) "The Cruel Sea Captain" from Two Ballads of the Sea Op. 50 (1958) "Galliard" and "Air" from Suite for Harpsichord or Piano Op, 54 (1960); Corentyne Kwe-Kwe Op. 76 (1972)	The Music Group of London – Hugh Bean (violin), Eileen Croxford (cello), David Parkhouse (piano)	Lyrita SRCD 256
2011	"Cello Concertos"	Concert Suite for cello and orchestra Op. 37 (1952)	BBC Concert Orchestra, Raphael Wallfisch (cello), Martin Yates (conductor)	Dutton Epoch CDLX 7263
2011	"British Recorder Music"	Sonatina for descant, treble and tenor recorders (one player), and piano Op. 82 (1975)	Ross Winters (recorder), Adam Dopadlik (recorder), Michael Keen (recorder), Julian Jacobson (piano, harpsichord), Yuka Matsumoto (violin), Jessica Burroughs (cello)	Meridian CDE 84608SBT 1493
2012	"Alan Bush: Lascaux Symphony"	Dance Overture Op. 12 (1935); Symphony No. 4 – Lascaux Symphony Op. 98 (1982–83); Dorian Passacaglia and Fugue for orchestra Op. 52 (1959)	Royal Scottish National Orchestra, Martin Yates (conductor), Sam Hutchings (piano)	Dutton Epoch CDLX 7294
2013	"Alan Bush"	Africa for piano and orchestra Op. 73 (1972); Symphony No 2 – "Nottingham" Op. 33 (1949); Fantasia on Soviet Themes Op. 24 (1942)	Royal Scottish National Orchestra, Martin Yates (conductor), Peter Donohoe (piano)	Dutton Epoch CDLX 7306
2014	"Noel Mewton-Wood – Peter Pears"	Voices of the Prophets, Op. 41 (1953)	Noel Mewton-Wood (piano), Peter Pears (tenor)	Testament SBT 1493 (Note: Also issued in 2011, an item in "A Treasury of English Song" sung by Peter Pears. Australian Eloquence ELQ4801273)
2015	"John Ireland, His Friends & Pupils"	Esquisse: Le Quartorze Juillet Op. 38 (1943)	Eric Parkin (piano)	Chandos CHAN2006
