= Jonathan Newell =

English cricketer

Personal information
- Full name: Jonathan James Newell
- Born: 30 September 1978 (age 48); Crawley, Sussex, England
- Batting: Right-handed
- Bowling: Right-arm off break
- Relatives: Mark Newell (brother), Keith Newell (brother)

Domestic team information
- Years: Team
- 1999: Sussex Cricket Board

Career statistics
Competition	LA
Matches	1
Runs scored	9
Batting average	–
100s/50s	–/–
Top score	9*
Balls bowled	42
Wickets	–
Bowling average	–
5 wickets in innings	–
10 wickets in match	–
Best bowling	–
Catches/stumpings	–/–
- Source: Cricinfo, 23 October 2010

Jonathan James Newell (born 30 September 1978) is a former English cricketer. Newell was a right-handed batsman who bowled right-arm off break. He was born at Crawley, Sussex.

Newell represented the Sussex Cricket Board in a single List A match against Hertfordshire in the 1999 NatWest Trophy.

In 2005, he joined Buckinghamshire. He made his debut in the Minor Counties Championship against Staffordshire. From 2005 to 2007, he represented the county in 15 Championship matches, the last of which came against Hertfordshire. Newell also represented the county in the MCCA Knockout Trophy, where he played 3 matches for the county between 2005 and 2006 against Wiltshire, Cambridgeshire and Hertfordshire.

== Family ==
His brother Mark played first-class cricket for Sussex and Derbyshire, as well as List A cricket for the Sussex Cricket Board. Additionally, he also represented Buckinghamshire in Minor Counties cricket. His other brother Keith played first-class cricket for Sussex, Matabeleland and Glamorgan. He also played List A cricket for Wales Minor Counties.
