= Keith Newell =

Keith Newell may refer to:

- Keith Newell (cricketer) (born 1972), English cricketer
- Keith Newell (American football) (born 1988), American football offensive lineman
