= Richard Jackson (cricketer) =

English cricketer

Personal information
- Full name: Richard Neville Jackson
- Born: 8 December 1979 (age 46); Sittingbourne, Kent, England
- Batting: Right-handed
- Bowling: Right-arm off break

Domestic team information
- Years: Team
- 2001: Sussex Cricket Board

Career statistics
Competition	LA
Matches	4
Runs scored	56
Batting average	14.00
100s/50s	–/–
Top score	22
Balls bowled	–
Wickets	–
Bowling average	–
5 wickets in innings	–
10 wickets in match	–
Best bowling	–
Catches/stumpings	–/–
- Source: Cricinfo, 23 October 2010

Richard Neville Jackson (born 8 December 1979) is an English cricketer. Jackson was a right-handed batsman who bowled right-arm off break. He was born at Sittingbourne, Kent.

Jackson represented the Sussex Cricket Board in 4 List A matches. These came against Shropshire and Gloucestershire in the 2001 Cheltenham & Gloucester Trophy and the Essex Cricket Board and Wales Minor Counties in the 1st and 2nd rounds of the 2002 Cheltenham & Gloucester Trophy which was held in 2001. In his 4 List A matches, he scored 56 runs at a batting average of 14.00, with a high score of 22.
