= Nico Reifer =

Barbadian cricketer (born 2000)

Personal information
- Full name: Nico Malik Julian Reifer
- Born: 11 November 2000 (age 26); Bridgetown, Barbados
- Batting: Right-handed
- Bowling: Right-arm medium
- Role: All-rounder
- Relatives: Raymon Reifer (cousin)

Domestic team information
- Years: Team
- 2021–2022: Surrey (squad no. 27)
- Only First-class: 20 May 2022 Surrey v SLC Development XI
- List A debut: 22 July 2021 Surrey v Yorkshire

Career statistics
Competition	FC	LA	T20
Matches	1	18	2
Runs scored	68	276	4
Batting average	68.00	25.09	2.00
100s/50s	0/1	0/2	0/0
Top score	68	70	4
Catches/stumpings	1/–	10/–	0/–
- Source: Cricinfo, 25 September 2022

Nico Malik Julian Reifer (born 11 November 2000) is a Barbadian cricketer. Reifer signed a rookie contract with Surrey in October 2019. Prior to that he made his first appearance for the club's age-grade side at 15. He attended Whitgift School from 2015 and has captained Barbados at youth level. He made his List A debut on 22 July 2021, for Surrey in the 2021 Royal London One-Day Cup. He made his first-class debut on 20 May 2022, for Surrey against the Sri Lanka Cricket Development XI side during their tour of England. He made his Twenty20 debut on 21 June 2022, for Surrey in the 2022 T20 Blast.
