= Andrew Cornford =

English cricketer

Personal information
- Full name: Andrew Richard Cornford
- Born: 8 October 1970 (age 56); Crowborough, Sussex, England
- Batting: Right-handed
- Bowling: Right-arm medium

Domestic team information
- Years: Team
- 2001-2002: Sussex Cricket Board

Career statistics
Competition	LA
Matches	3
Runs scored	9
Batting average	4.50
100s/50s	–/–
Top score	9
Balls bowled	174
Wickets	6
Bowling average	19.50
5 wickets in innings	–
10 wickets in match	–
Best bowling	3/38
Catches/stumpings	3/–
- Source: Cricinfo, 22 October 2010

Andrew Richard Cornford (born 8 October 1970) is a former English cricketer. Cornford was a right-handed batsman who bowled right-arm medium pace. He was born at Crowborough, Sussex.

Cornford represented the Sussex Cricket Board in 3 List A matches. These came against the Essex Cricket Board and Wales Minor Counties in the 1st and 2nd rounds of the 2002 Cheltenham & Gloucester Trophy which was held in 2001, and the Worcestershire Cricket Board in the 2nd round of the 2003 Cheltenham & Gloucester Trophy which was held in 2002. In his 3 List A matches, he scored 9 runs at a batting average of 4.50, with a high score of 9. In the field he took 3 catches. With the ball he took 6 wickets at a bowling average of 19.50, with best figures of 3/38.
