= Bradley Smith (cricketer) =

English cricketer

Personal information
- Full name: Bradley Smith
- Born: 28 September 1969 (age 57); Margate, Kent, England
- Batting: Right-handed
- Bowling: Right-arm medium

Domestic team information
- Years: Team
- 1999: Sussex Cricket Board

Career statistics
| Competition | LA |
|---|---|
| Matches | 1 |
| Runs scored | 16 |
| Batting average | 16.00 |
| 100s/50s | –/– |
| Top score | 16 |
| Balls bowled | – |
| Wickets | – |
| Bowling average | – |
| 5 wickets in innings | – |
| 10 wickets in match | – |
| Best bowling | – |
| Catches/stumpings | 1/– |
- Source: Cricinfo, 23 October 2010

Bradley Smith (born 28 September 1969) is a former English cricketer. Smith was a right-handed batsman who bowled right-arm medium pace. He was born at Margate, Kent.

Smith represented the Sussex Cricket Board in a single List A match against Hertfordshire in the 1999 NatWest Trophy. In his only List A match, he scored 16 runs and took a single catch in the field.
