= Stuart Simmonds =

English cricketer and author

Personal information
- Full name: Stuart Simmonds
- Born: 23 January 1967 (age 59); Birmingham, England
- Batting: Right-handed
- Bowling: Right-arm medium-fast

Domestic team information
- Years: Team
- 1999: Sussex Cricket Board

Career statistics
Competition	LA
Matches	1
Runs scored	14
Batting average	–
100s/50s	–/–
Top score	14*
Balls bowled	48
Wickets	2
Bowling average	25.00
5 wickets in innings	–
10 wickets in match	–
Best bowling	2/50
Catches/stumpings	–/–
- Source: Cricinfo, 23 October 2010

Stuart Simmonds (born 23 January 1967) is an English cricketer and author. Simmonds is a right-handed batsman who bowls right-arm medium-fast. He was born at Birmingham.

Simmonds represented the Sussex Cricket Board in a single List A match against Hertfordshire in the 1999 NatWest Trophy. In his only List A match, he scored an unbeaten 14 runs, while taking a 2 wickets at a bowling average of 25.00, with figures of 2/50.

== Autobiography ==
Simmonds' autobiography "Watching With My Heroes" 1-787-19583-X, with a foreword by Derek Pringle was published in October 2017 with a book launch at The Folly in London on 31 October 2017 attended by both Derek Pringle and David Gower; cited by Simmonds in the book as the reason he became a Cricketer.

Stuart has recently released an updated edition of his autobiography with additional chapters and with a foreword by David Bowden MBE from Sussex Cricket.

Stuart is also currently a Vice President of the Sussex Cricket Foundation, the charity arm of Sussex Cricket.

== Children's Fiction ==
Hannah the Spanner

In 2019 Simmonds initially published the first six Hannah the Spanner books, with a seventh released in November 2019 in the "Hannah the Spanner" series, with illustrations by Bill Greenhead.

- Hannah the Spanner and the Dancing Bear ISBN 9781999318116
- Hannah the Spanner and the Robot ISBN 9781999318130
- Hannah the Spanner and the Circus ISBN 9781999318154
- Hannah the Spanner and the Trip to the Moon ISBN 9781999318178
- Hannah the Spanner and the Diamond Robbery ISBN 9781999318192
- Hannah the Spanner and the Racing Car ISBN 9781999318215

Released on 7 November 2019 together with a book launch in Foyles, London on 27 November 2019:

- Hannah the Spanner and the Polar Bears ISBN 9781999318239

An animated trailer narrated by Dawn French has also been released

Harry the Karate Monkey

In September 2020 Simmonds released Harry the Karate Money, the first in a new series of books written for his second daughter Lucy, with several more to follow.

- Harry the Karate Monkey ISBN 978-1999318277

Sevenhills Stories

Written around the town where both his characters Hannah and Lucy live, Simmonds penned the first three rhyming books in his Sevenhills Stories series which were released in January 2021.

- What's the Plan Stan ISBN 978-1-8382914-3-3
- Parker and Rudi's Most Amazing Adventure ISBN 978-1-8382914-1-9
- Don't touch that razor, Fraser ISBN 978-1-9993182-9-1

Foreign Rights

In March 2021, Simmonds signed a deal with Rightol Media Ltd, who acquired the rights to his back catalogue. This agreement will see his books sold and translated in 34 countries and languages.
