= Michael Harrison (cricketer) =

English cricketer

Personal information
- Full name: Michael Thomas Harrison
- Born: 25 August 1978 (age 48); Cuckfield, Sussex, England
- Batting: Right-handed
- Bowling: Right-arm medium-fast

Domestic team information
- Years: Team
- 2002: Sussex Cricket Board

Career statistics
| Competition | LA |
|---|---|
| Matches | 1 |
| Runs scored | 7 |
| Batting average | – |
| 100s/50s | –/– |
| Top score | 7* |
| Balls bowled | 35 |
| Wickets | 1 |
| Bowling average | 41.00 |
| 5 wickets in innings | – |
| 10 wickets in match | – |
| Best bowling | 1/41 |
| Catches/stumpings | –/– |
- Source: Cricinfo, 21 October 2010

Michael Thomas Harrison (born 25 August 1978) is an English cricketer. Harrison is a right-handed batsman who bowls right-arm medium-fast. He was born at Cuckfield, Sussex.

Harrison represented the Sussex Cricket Board in a single List A match came against the Worcestershire Cricket Board in the 2nd round of the 2003 Cheltenham & Gloucester Trophy which was held in 2002. In his only List A match, he scored an unbeaten 7 runs With the ball he took a single wicket at figures of 1/41.
