= Andrew Perry (Sussex cricketer) =

English cricketer

Personal information
- Full name: Andrew Perry
- Born: 20 May 1984 (age 42); Chichester, Sussex, England
- Batting: Right-handed
- Bowling: Right-arm medium

Domestic team information
- Years: Team
- 2002: Sussex Cricket Board

Career statistics
| Competition | LA |
|---|---|
| Matches | 1 |
| Runs scored | 4 |
| Batting average | 4.00 |
| 100s/50s | –/– |
| Top score | 4 |
| Balls bowled | – |
| Wickets | – |
| Bowling average | – |
| 5 wickets in innings | – |
| 10 wickets in match | – |
| Best bowling | – |
| Catches/stumpings | –/– |
- Source: Cricinfo, 22 October 2010

Andrew Perry (born 20 May 1984) is a former English cricketer. Perry is a right-handed batsman who bowls right-arm medium pace. He was born at Chichester, Sussex.

Perry represented the Sussex Cricket Board in a single List A match came against the Worcestershire Cricket Board in the 2nd round of the 2003 Cheltenham & Gloucester Trophy which was held in 2002. In his only List A match, he scored 4 runs.
