= Brian Chambers (cricketer) =

Australian-born English cricketer (born 1965)

Personal information
- Full name: Brian Andrew Chambers
- Born: 1 April 1965 (age 61); Melbourne, Victoria, Australia
- Nickname: Chambo/BIFFA
- Batting: Right-handed
- Bowling: Left-arm fast-medium
- Relatives: 3 Children

Domestic team information
- Years: Team
- 1999: Sussex Cricket Board

Career statistics
Competition	LA
Matches	1
Runs scored	4
Batting average	4
100s/50s
Top score	4
Balls bowled
Wickets	1
Bowling average	30
5 wickets in innings
10 wickets in match
Best bowling	1/30
Catches/stumpings	1/–
- Source: Cricinfo, 23 October 2010

Brian Andrew Chambers (born 1 April 1965) is an Australian born English cricketer. Chambers was a right-handed batsman who bowled left-arm fast-medium. He was born in Melbourne, Victoria.

Chambers represented the Sussex Cricket Board in a single List A match against Hertfordshire in the 1999 NatWest Trophy. In his only List A match, he scored 4 runs and took a single catch in the field, while taking a single wicket with figures of 1/30.
