= John Morgan (cricketer) =

English cricketer

Personal information
- Full name: John Richard Morgan
- Born: 16 March 1977 (age 49); Hastings, Sussex, England
- Nickname: Morgs
- Height: 6 ft 3 in (1.91 m)
- Batting: Right-handed
- Bowling: Right-armmedium-fast

Domestic team information
- Years: Team
- 2000-2002: Sussex Cricket Board

Career statistics
Competition	LA
Matches	7
Runs scored	10
Batting average	3.33
100s/50s	–/–
Top score	5
Balls bowled	336
Wickets	10
Bowling average	22.40
5 wickets in innings	–
10 wickets in match	–
Best bowling	4/55
Catches/stumpings	1/–
- Source: Cricinfo, 23 October 2010

John Richard Morgan (born 16 March 1977) is a former English cricketer. Morgan was a right-handed batsman and a right arm medium-fast bowler. He was born at Hastings, Sussex, and is the son of Richard Ashley Morgan.

Morgan represented the Sussex Cricket Board in List A cricket. His debut List A game came against Herefordshire in the 2000 NatWest Trophy. From 2000 to 2002, he represented the Board in 7 List A matches, the last of which came against the Worcestershire Cricket Board in the 2nd round of the 2003 Cheltenham & Gloucester Trophy which was held in 2002. In his 7 List A matches, he took 10 wickets at a bowling average of 22.40, with best figures of 4/55.
