= Mattie McKiernan =

English cricketer (born 1994)

Personal information
- Full name: Matthew Harry McKiernan
- Born: 14 June 1994 (age 32); Billinge Higher End, Manchester, England
- Batting: Right-handed
- Bowling: Right-arm leg break

Domestic team information
- Years: Team
- 2016–2018: Cumberland
- 2018–2023: Derbyshire (squad no. 21)
- First-class debut: 16 September 2019 Derbyshire v Sussex
- List A debut: 22 July 2021; Derbyshire v Leicestershire

Career statistics
Competition	FC	LA	T20
Matches	8	17	42
Runs scored	307	305	273
Batting average	25.58	25.41	14.36
100s/50s	1/2	0/1	0/0
Top score	101	72*	26
Balls bowled	338	414	720
Wickets	6	7	32
Bowling average	35.00	62.57	32.00
5 wickets in innings	0	0	0
10 wickets in match	0	0	0
Best bowling	2/3	1/14	3/9
Catches/stumpings	8/–	7/–	15/–
- Source: Cricinfo, 23 August 2023

Matthew Harry McKiernan (born 14 June 1994) is an English former cricketer, a legspinning all-rounder he played for Derbyshire between 2018 and 2023. He made his Twenty20 debut for Derbyshire in the 2018 t20 Blast on 14 July 2018. He made his List A debut on 22 July 2021, for Derbyshire in the 2021 Royal London One-Day Cup. In April 2022, in the 2022 County Championship, McKiernan scored his maiden century in first-class cricket, with 101 against Leicestershire. In the 2022 T20 Blast quarter-final against Somerset he recorded the most expensive 4-overs in T20 history as he conceded 82 runs.

McKiernan retired from professional cricket at the end of the 2023 season.
