= Andrew Winstone =

English cricketer

Personal information
- Full name: Andrew Charles Winstone
- Born: 16 March 1975 (age 51); Wells, Somerset, England
- Batting: Right-handed
- Bowling: Right-arm off break

Domestic team information
- Years: Team
- 2001: Sussex Cricket Board

Career statistics
Competition	LA
Matches	1
Runs scored	–
Batting average	–
100s/50s	–/–
Top score	–
Balls bowled	54
Wickets	–
Bowling average	–
5 wickets in innings	–
10 wickets in match	–
Best bowling	–
Catches/stumpings	2/–
- Source: Cricinfo, 22 October 2010

Andrew Charles Winstone (born 16 March 1975) is a former English cricketer. Winstone was a right-handed batsman who bowled right-arm off break. He was born at Wells, Somerset. Andrew Winstone represented Somerset 2nd XI between 1991 and 1994 and Captained Somerset U19s. Winstone represented the Sussex Cricket Board in a single List A match against Shropshire in the 2nd round of the 2001 Cheltenham & Gloucester Trophy at Horntye Park, Hastings.
