= Marc Hazelton =

English cricketer

Personal information
- Full name: Marc Alexander Hazelton
- Born: 18 October 1980 (age 46); Eastbourne, Sussex, England
- Batting: Right-handed
- Bowling: Right-arm medium-fast

Domestic team information
- Years: Team
- 2002: Durham UCCE
- 2001: Sussex Cricket Board

Career statistics
Competition	FC	LA
Matches	1	1
Runs scored	16	–
Batting average	8.00	–
100s/50s	–/–	–/–
Top score	11	–
Balls bowled	60	18
Wickets	–	–
Bowling average	–	–
5 wickets in innings	–	–
10 wickets in match	–	–
Best bowling	–	–
Catches/stumpings	2/–	–/–
- Source: Cricinfo, 22 October 2010

Marc Alexander Hazelton (born 17 October 1980) is a former English cricketer. Hazelton was a right-handed batsman who bowled right-arm medium-fast. He was born at Cuckfield, Sussex.

Hazelton represented the Sussex Cricket Board in a single List A match against Shropshire in the 2nd round of the 2001 Cheltenham & Gloucester Trophy.

In 2002, he played a single first-class match for Durham UCCE against Nottinghamshire. In his only first-class match, he scored 16 runs at a batting average of 8.00, with a high score of 11. In the field he took 2 catches.
