= Christopher Mole =

English cricketer (born 1978)

Personal information
- Full name: Christopher Matti Mole
- Born: 20 February 1978 (age 48); Cuckfield, Sussex, England
- Batting: Left-handed
- Role: Wicketkeeper

Domestic team information
- Years: Team
- 2011-present: Dorset
- 2003-2010: Devon
- 1999-2002: Sussex Cricket Board

Career statistics
Competition	List A
Matches	9
Runs scored	216
Batting average	27.00
100s/50s	–/1
Top score	66
Balls bowled	–
Wickets	–
Bowling average	–
5 wickets in innings	–
10 wickets in match	–
Best bowling	–
Catches/stumpings	4/2
- Source: Cricinfo, 23 October 2010

Christopher Matti Mole (born 20 February 1978) is an English cricketer. Mole is a left-handed batsman who plays primarily as a wicketkeeper. He was born at Cuckfield, Sussex.

Mole made his debut in List A cricket for the Sussex Cricket Board. His debut List A game came against Hertfordshire in the 1999 NatWest Trophy. From 1999 to 2002, he represented the Board in 5 List A matches, the last of which came against the Worcestershire Cricket Board in the 2nd round of the 2003 Cheltenham & Gloucester Trophy which was held in 2002.

In 2003, Mole joined Devon. He made his debut in the Minor Counties Championship against Herefordshire. He played for Devon from 2003 to 2001, he has represented Devon in 27 Championship matches. Mole has also represented Devon in the MCCA Knockout Trophy, making his debut in that competition for the county against Shropshire in 2003.

Additionally, he also represented Devon in List A cricket. His List A debut for the county came against Suffolk in the 1st round of the 2004 Cheltenham & Gloucester Trophy which was held in 2003. From 2003 to 2005, he represented the county in 4 List A matches, the last of which came against Essex in the 2005 Cheltenham & Gloucester Trophy. In his combined total of 9 List A matches, he scored 216 runs at a batting average of 27.00, with a single half century high score of 66. Meanwhile, behind the stumps he took 4 catches and made 2 stumpings.

He joined Dorset in 2011.
