= Nicholas Creed =

English cricketer

Personal information
- Full name: Nicholas John Keyworth Creed
- Born: 28 August 1980 (age 46); Cuckfield, Sussex, England
- Batting: Right-handed
- Bowling: Right-arm fast-medium

Domestic team information
- Years: Team
- 2000-2002: Sussex Cricket Board

Career statistics
Competition	LA
Matches	3
Runs scored	14
Batting average	14.00
100s/50s	–/–
Top score	6
Balls bowled	96
Wickets	3
Bowling average	28.33
5 wickets in innings	–
10 wickets in match	–
Best bowling	2/33
Catches/stumpings	–/–
- Source: Cricinfo, 23 October 2010

Nicholas John Keyworth Creed (born 28 August 1980) is an English cricketer. Creed is a right-handed batsman who bowls right-arm fast-medium. He was born at Cuckfield, Sussex.

Creed represented the Sussex Cricket Board in 3 List A matches. These came against Herefordshire and Berkshire in the 2000 NatWest Trophy and the Worcestershire Cricket Board in the 2nd round of the 2003 Cheltenham & Gloucester Trophy which was held in 2002. In his 3 List A matches, he took 3 wickets at a bowling average of 28.33, with best figures of 2/33.
