= Danny Alderman =

English cricketer

Personal information
- Full name: Daniel Alan Alderman
- Born: 14 August 1976 (age 50); Cuckfield, Sussex, England
- Batting: Right-handed
- Bowling: Right-arm medium

Domestic team information
- Years: Team
- 1999-2001: Sussex Cricket Board

Career statistics
Competition	LA
Matches	6
Runs scored	38
Batting average	12.66
100s/50s	–/–
Top score	14*
Balls bowled	338
Wickets	3
Bowling average	56.00
5 wickets in innings	–
10 wickets in match	–
Best bowling	1/15
Catches/stumpings	–/–
- Source: Cricinfo, 23 October 2010

Daniel Alan Alderman (born 14 August 1976) is an English first-class cricketer. Alderman is a right-handed batsman who bowls right-arm medium pace. He was born at Cuckfield, Sussex.

Alderman represented the Sussex Cricket Board in List A cricket. His debut List A game came against Hertfordshire in the 1999 NatWest Trophy. From 1999 to 2001, he represented the Board in 6 List A matches, the last of which came against Essex Cricket Board in the 1st round of the 2002 Cheltenham & Gloucester Trophy which was held in 2001. In his 6 List A matches, he scored 38 runs at a batting average of 12.66, with a high score of 14*. With the ball he took 3 wickets at a bowling average of 56.00, with best figures of 1/15.

He currently plays club cricket for Three Bridges Cricket Club in the Sussex Cricket League.
