= Nick Weekes =

English cricketer

Personal information
- Full name: Nicholas Paul Weekes
- Born: 20 August 1981 (age 45); Crawley, Sussex, England
- Batting: Right-handed
- Bowling: Right-arm fast

Domestic team information
- Years: Team
- 2001: Sussex Cricket Board

Career statistics
Competition	LA
Matches	1
Runs scored	5
Batting average	5.00
100s/50s	–/–
Top score	5
Balls bowled	60
Wickets	1
Bowling average	51.00
5 wickets in innings	–
10 wickets in match	–
Best bowling	1/51
Catches/stumpings	1/–
- Source: Cricinfo, 22 October 2010

Nicholas 'Nick' Paul Weekes (born 20 October 1981) is a former English cricketer. Weekes is a right-handed batsman who bowls right-arm fast. He was born at Crawley, Sussex.

Weekes represented the Sussex Cricket Board in a single List A match came against the Wales Minor Counties in the 2nd round of the 2002 Cheltenham & Gloucester Trophy which was held in 2001. In his only List A match, he scored 5 runs and took a single catch in the field. With the ball he took a single wicket with figures of 1/51.
