= Ian Cox (cricketer) =

English cricketer

Personal information
- Full name: Ian Cox
- Born: 24 February 1967 (age 59); Heathfield, Sussex, England
- Batting: Right-handed
- Bowling: Right-arm medium

Domestic team information
- Years: Team
- 1999: Sussex Cricket Board

Career statistics
Competition	LA
Matches	1
Runs scored	10
Batting average	10.00
100s/50s	–/–
Top score	10
Balls bowled	–
Wickets	–
Bowling average	–
5 wickets in innings	–
10 wickets in match	–
Best bowling	–
Catches/stumpings	–/–
- Source: Cricinfo, 23 October 2010

Ian Cox (born 24 February 1967) is a former English cricketer. Cox was a right-handed batsman who bowled right-arm medium pace. He was born at Heathfield, Sussex.

Cox represented the Sussex Cricket Board in a single List A match against Hertfordshire in the 1999 NatWest Trophy, scoring 10 runs.
