= Dom Leech =

English cricketer (born 2001)

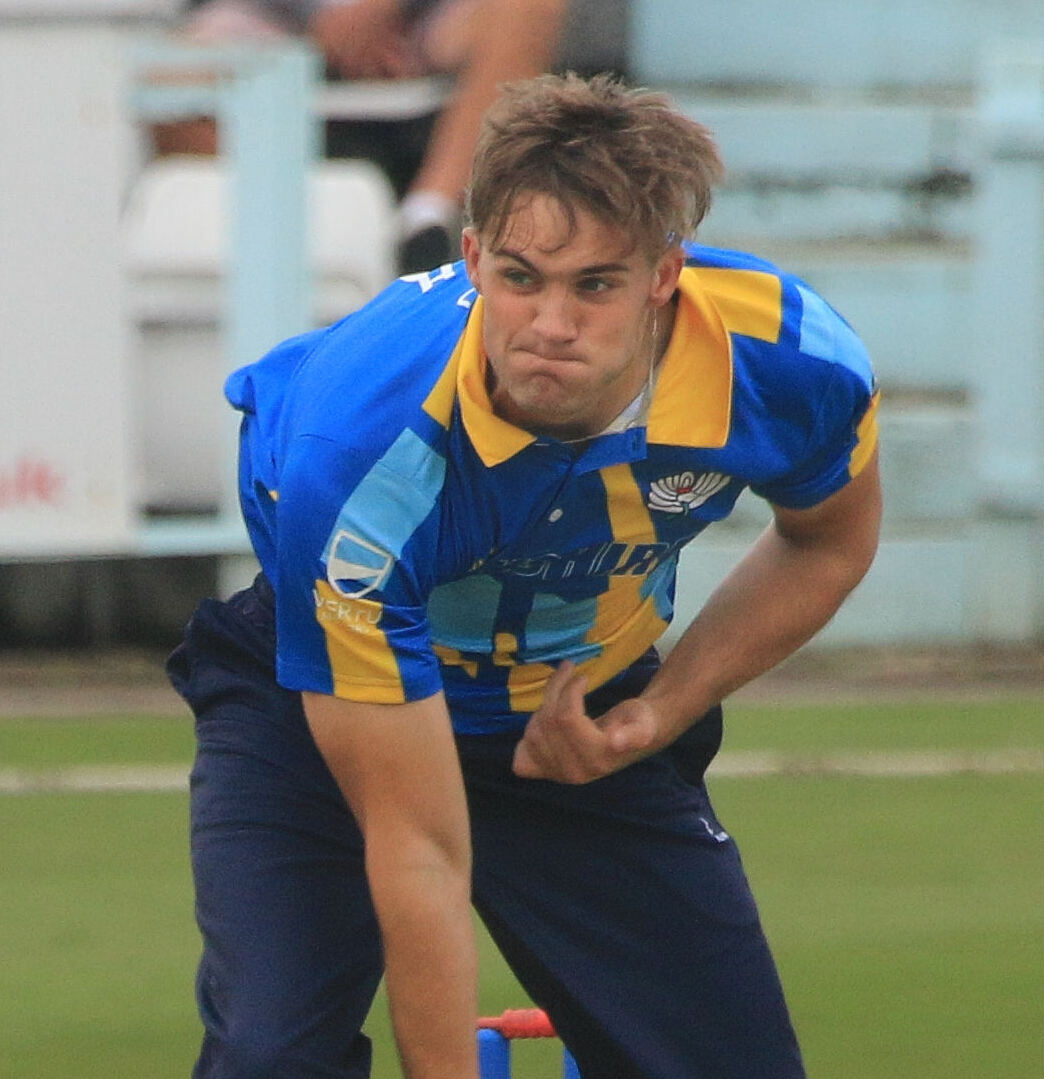
- Leech in 2023

Personal information
- Full name: Dominic James Leech
- Born: 10 January 2001 (age 25); Middlesbrough, North Yorkshire, England
- Batting: Right-handed
- Bowling: Right-arm medium

Domestic team information
- Years: Team
- 2020–2024: Yorkshire (squad no. 8)
- 2024: → Northamptonshire (on loan)
- 2025–present: Northamptonshire (squad no. 8)
- First-class debut: 8 August 2020 Yorkshire v Nottinghamshire
- List A debut: 1 August 2023 Yorkshire v Kent

Career statistics
Competition	FC	LA	T20
Matches	14	18	7
Runs scored	106	190	1
Batting average	7.06	17.27	1.00
100s/50s	0/0	0/0	0/0
Top score	32	36	1*
Balls bowled	1,465	755	109
Wickets	19	148	8
Bowling average	59.63	43.83	17.62
5 wickets in innings	0	0	0
10 wickets in match	0	0	0
Best bowling	3/78	3/48	3/13
Catches/stumpings	2/–	2/–	0/–
- Source: Cricinfo, 11 August 2026

Dominic James Leech (born 10 January 2001) is an English cricketer. He made his first-class debut on 8 August 2020, for Yorkshire in the 2020 Bob Willis Trophy. He made his Twenty20 debut on 10 June 2022, for Yorkshire in the 2022 T20 Blast.

In August 2024 he joined Northamptonshire, initially on loan for the remainder of the 2024 season before signing a three-year contract from the 2025 season.
