= Steven Ades =

English cricketer (born 1982)

Personal information
- Full name: Steven Robert Ades
- Born: 1 March 1982 (age 44); Brighton, Sussex, England
- Batting: Right-handed
- Bowling: Right-arm off break

Domestic team information
- Years: Team
- 2000–2001: Sussex Cricket Board

Career statistics
Competition	List A
Matches	5
Runs scored	5
Batting average	1.66
100s/50s	0/0
Top score	3
Balls bowled	264
Wickets	5
Bowling average	41.20
5 wickets in innings	0
10 wickets in match	0
Best bowling	2/37
Catches/stumpings	1/–
- Source: Cricinfo, 21 October 2010

Steven Robert Ades (born 1 March 1982) is a former English first-class cricketer. Ades was a right-handed batsman who bowled right-arm off break.

== Biography ==
Born in Brighton, Sussex, Ades represented the Sussex Cricket Board in List A cricket. The first of these came against Herefordshire in the 2000 NatWest Trophy. From 2000 to 2001, he represented the county in five List A matches, the last of which came against Wales Minor Counties in the second round of the 2002 Cheltenham & Gloucester Trophy which was held in 2001. In his five matches, he scored 3 runs at a batting average of 1.66, with a high score of 3. In the field he took a single catch. With the ball he took 5 wickets at a bowling average of 41.20, with best figures of 2/37.
