= Paul Stevens (cricketer) =

English cricketer (born 1973)

Paul James Stevens (born 31 July 1973) is a former English cricketer, born in Eastbourne, Sussex. A right-handed batsman and wicket-keeper, he played a few times for Sussex County Cricket Club's Second XI in 1992, and made eight List A appearances for the Sussex Cricket Board team between 1998 and 2002, all in the NatWest Trophy and its successor the C&G Trophy.

His highest score was a 62 against Shropshire in 2001. His last game was in 2002 when he sent down three overs for 18 runs without taking a wicket. He took 11 catches, and made one stumping, the latter being that of Herefordshire's Neeraj Prabhu.
