= George Scrimshaw (cricketer) =

English cricketer (born 1998)

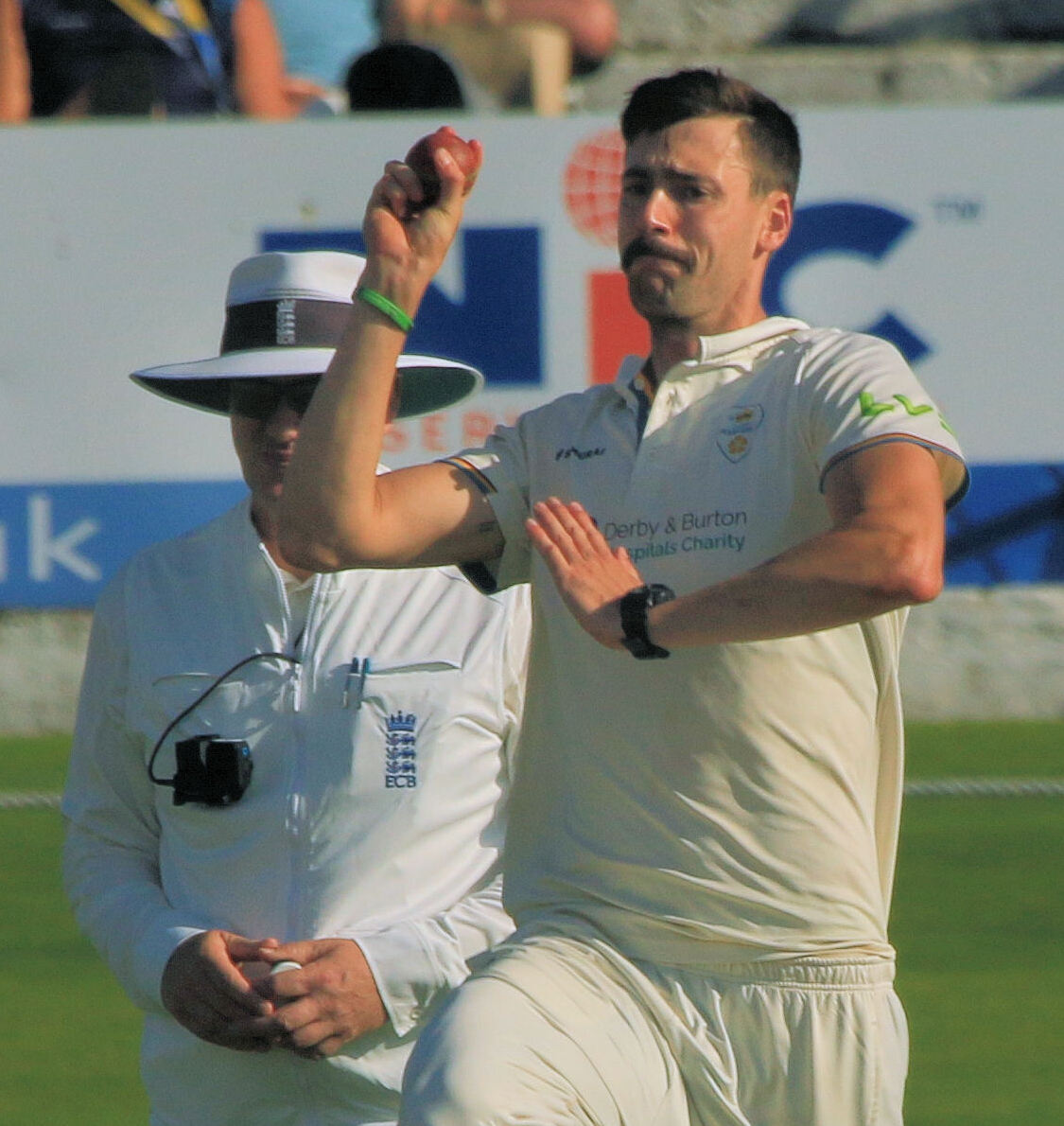
- Scrimshaw playing for Derbyshire in 2023

Personal information
- Full name: George Louis Sheridan Scrimshaw
- Born: 10 February 1998 (age 28); Burton upon Trent, Staffordshire, England
- Height: 201 cm (6 ft 7 in)
- Batting: Right-handed
- Bowling: Right-arm medium-fast
- Role: Bowler

International information
- National side: England (2023)
- Only ODI (cap 273): 23 September 2023 v Ireland
- ODI shirt no.: 52

Domestic team information
- Years: Team
- 2017: Worcestershire (squad no. 9)
- 2021–2023: Derbyshire (squad no. 9)
- 2022: Welsh Fire
- 2024: Sylhet Strikers
- 2024–: Northamptonshire

Career statistics
Competition	ODI	FC	LA	T20
Matches	1	13	5	80
Runs scored	–	78	13	32
Batting average	–	7.09	–	8.00
100s/50s	–	0/0	0/0	0/0
Top score	–	19*	13*	6*
Balls bowled	52	1,374	172	1,573
Wickets	3	25	7	108
Bowling average	22.00	42.76	30.85	22.06
5 wickets in innings	0	1	0	0
10 wickets in match	0	0	0	0
Best bowling	3/66	5/49	3/66	4/19
Catches/stumpings	0/–	5/–	1/–	13/–
- Source: Cricinfo, 17 July 2026

George Louis Sheridan Scrimshaw (born 10 February 1998) is an English cricketer. A product of the Worcestershire academy system, he signed his first professional contract with the county in 2016 and was also called up to the England under-19 squad that year, but withdrew due to injury. He signed a long-term contract extension with Worcestershire ahead of the 2017 season and made his county debut in the 2017 NatWest t20 Blast on 5 August 2017. He was released by Worcestershire at the end of the 2020 season.

After a trial period, he signed for Derbyshire in March 2021. He made his first-class debut on 22 April 2021, for Derbyshire against Durham in the 2021 County Championship. He made his List A debut on 4 August 2021, for Derbyshire in the 2021 Royal London One-Day Cup. In August 2023 it was announced that he had signed a three-year contract with Northamptonshire beginning from the 2024 season.

Scrimshaw made his England international debut on 23 September 2023, taking 3 wickets for 66 runs in a one day international against Ireland.
