= Jason Finch =

English cricketer

Personal information
- Full name: Jason Michael Finch
- Born: 27 September 1969 (age 57); Hastings, Sussex, England
- Height: 5 ft 9 in (1.75 m)
- Batting: Right-handed
- Bowling: Right arm off-break
- Role: Occasional wicket-keeper

Domestic team information
- Years: Team
- 2001–2002: Sussex Cricket Board

Career statistics
Competition	List A
Matches	3
Runs scored	60
Batting average	30.00
100s/50s	0/0
Top score	26
Balls bowled	60
Wickets	1
Bowling average	22.00
5 wickets in innings	0
10 wickets in match	0
Best bowling	1/22
Catches/stumpings	0/–
- Source: Cricinfo, 21 October 2010

Jason Michael Finch (born 27 September 1969) is an English former cricketer. Finch played as a right-handed batsman, who began as a wicket-keeper and went on to play List A cricket as a batsman and an off-break bowler. He was born at Hastings, Sussex

Finch played for Sussex County Cricket Club's Second XI, including in fixtures against Oxford and Cambridge University and the Combined Services in 1990 and 1991, and for Sussex Cricket Board in three List A matches in 2001 and 2002. Growing up, Finch played in all the Sussex age groups and was selected for England under-15 and under-17 sides. In 1998 he played for the British Police. Finch played club cricket for Hastings and St Leonards Priory Cricket Club in the Sussex Cricket League where he has won seven premier league titles.

His son, Harry Finch, has played first-class cricket for Sussex and Kent County Cricket Clubs.
