= John Snashall =

English cricketer

Personal information
- Full name: John Stephen Snashall
- Born: 12 October 1982 (age 44); Eastbourne, Sussex, England
- Batting: Right-handed
- Bowling: Right-arm medium

Domestic team information
- Years: Team
- 2001: Sussex Cricket Board

Career statistics
Competition	LA
Matches	2
Runs scored	59
Batting average	29.50
100s/50s	–/1
Top score	56
Balls bowled	–
Wickets	–
Bowling average	–
5 wickets in innings	–
10 wickets in match	–
Best bowling	–
Catches/stumpings	–/–
- Source: Cricinfo, 22 October 2010

John Stephen Snashall (born 12 October 1982) is a former English cricketer. Snashall is a right-handed batsman who bowls right-arm medium pace. He was born at Eastbourne, Sussex.

Snashall represented the Sussex Cricket Board in 2 List A matches against the Essex Cricket Board and Wales Minor Counties in the 1st and 2nd rounds of the 2002 Cheltenham & Gloucester Trophy; both matches were played in 2001. In his 2 List A matches, he scored 59 runs at a batting average of 29.50, with a single half century high score of 56.
