= Mark Newell =

English cricketer and umpire

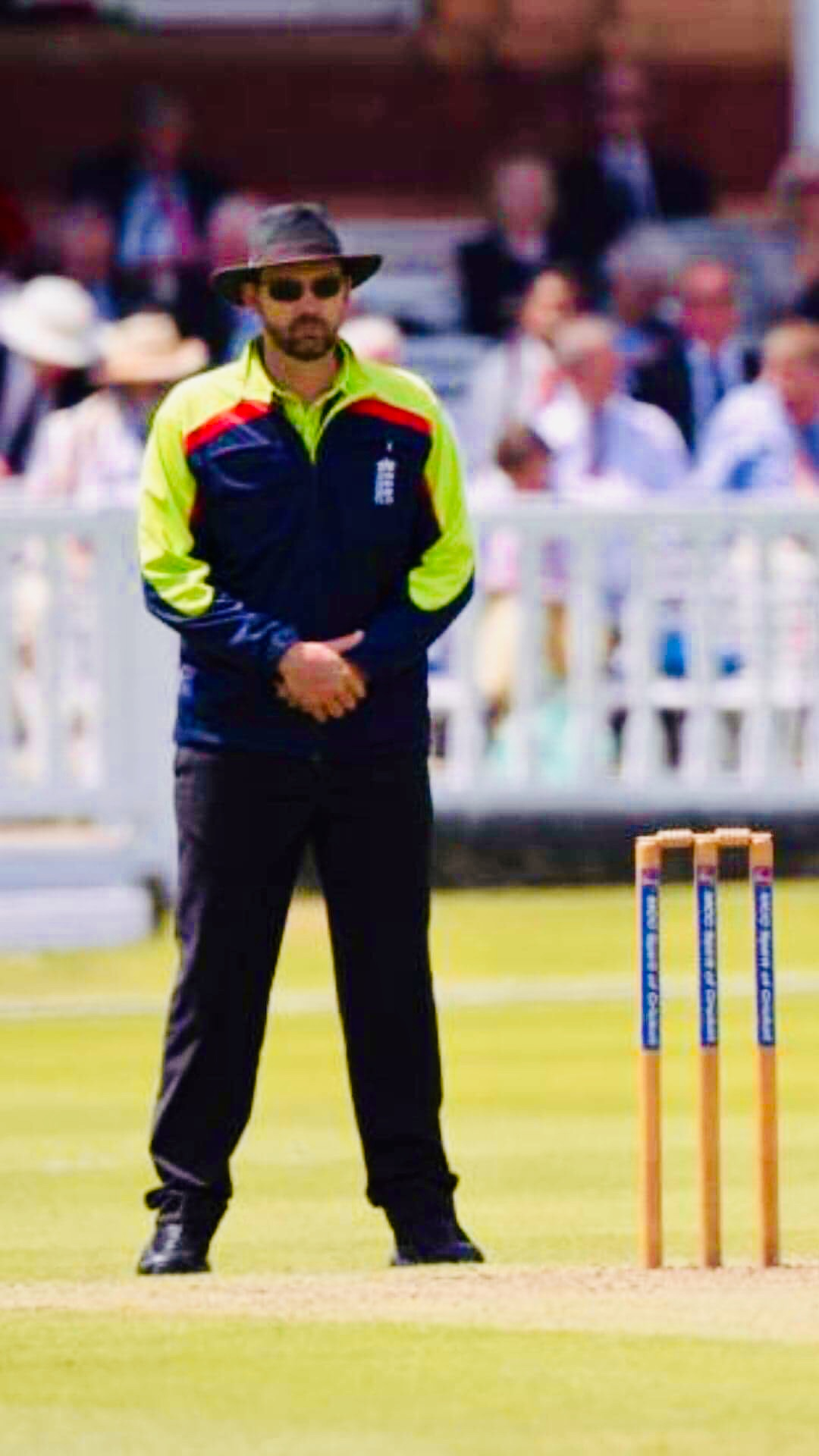
- Mark Newell umpiring at Lord's: Middlesex v Australia, 2018

Personal information
- Full name: Mark Newell
- Born: 19 December 1973 (age 52); Crawley, Sussex, England
- Batting: Right-handed
- Bowling: Right-arm off break
- Relatives: Jonathan Newell (brother); Keith Newell (brother)

Domestic team information
- Years: Team
- 1996–1999: Sussex
- FC debut: 3 September 1996 Sussex v Worcestershire
- LA debut: 11 August 1996 Sussex v Derbyshire

Umpiring information
- FC umpired: 65 (2017–Present)
- LA umpired: 32 (2018–Present)
- T20 umpired: 68 (2017–Present)

Career statistics
Competition	FC	LA
Matches	24	42
Runs scored	819	1,124
Batting average	23.39	32.11
100s/50s	3/3	0/9
Top score	135*	92
Catches/stumpings	–/–	–/–
- Source: CricketArchive, 05 October 2026

Mark Newell (born 19 December 1973) is an English former cricketer and current first-class cricket umpire. He was a right-handed batsman and occasional right-arm bowler who played for Sussex County Cricket Club and Derbyshire County Cricket Club between 1995 and 1999. He joined the ECB panel of first-class umpires in 2017.

Signing professional terms for his home county Sussex in 1994, Newell joined his elder brother Keith on the Sussex playing staff for the 1995 season, having enjoyed a successful year at Lord's on the young cricketers staff.

Newell made his first-class and List A debuts in 1996. It was in the short format that Newell proved most successful for Sussex, averaging 35 over the course of the next two seasons for the county. The Championship provided some success but no consistency of note. Three Championship centuries were scored including a career-high 135 not out against Derbyshire but a drastic loss of form half way through 1998 led to his being dropped and making no further appearances for the county.

A short-term deal at Derbyshire for the 1999 season was unsuccessful and he was subsequently released at the end of the season and played no further cricket at first-class level.

Newell joined the ECB first class umpiring panel in 2017 as a reserve list umpire, graduating to the full time list with the formation of the Professional Umpires Team in 2022.
