= Keith Newell (cricketer) =

English cricketer

Keith Newell (born 25 March 1972) is an English cricketer. He is a right-handed batsman and a right-arm medium-pace bowler.

Born in Crawley, he played First-class and List-A cricket from 1995 to 2005, playing for Sussex, Matabeleland and Glamorgan. Though in his first four years with the Sussex side, he was only to pick up appearances for the Second XI, he would make his debut for the full side in September 1994, where he would bat defiantly but eventually be bowled leg before wicket, ending his chances of success in the match.

During the next season, he would feature heavily in Sussex's plans, before playing twice for Matabeleland in 1995, including once in the Logan Cup in which his team would finish runners-up. He would play in seven Benson and Hedges Cup tournaments for both Sussex and Glamorgan, in the Mid-Wales (West) group.

He continued to make first-team and second-team appearances (most notably in the Second XI trophy) until 2002, from which he only made appearances in the C&G Trophy until 2005. Keith's brother, Mark, also played first-class cricket for Sussex.

Keith Newell has been the Director of Cricket at High Wycombe Cricket Club who play in the Home Counties Premier League. Later the Head of Cricket at St Benedict's School in Ealing, the Director of Coaching at South Northumberland Cricket Club in Newcastle but is currently the Head of Cricket at Bootham School in York.
