= Sussex Cricket Board =

The Sussex Cricket Board was the former governing body for all recreational cricket in the historic county of Sussex. On 1 November 2015, the Sussex Cricket Board (SCB) merged with Sussex County Cricket Club (SCCC) to form a single governing body for cricket in Sussex, called Sussex Cricket Limited (SCL).

From 1999 to 2003 the Board fielded a team in the English domestic one-day tournament, in matches which had List-A status.

== See also ==
- List of Sussex Cricket Board List A players
