= 2022 One-Day Cup =

Cricket tournament

2022 Royal London One-Day Cup
- Dates: 2 August – 17 September 2022
- Administrator: England and Wales Cricket Board
- Cricket format: Limited overs cricket (50 overs)
- Tournament format(s): Group stage and knockout
- Champions: Kent (1st title)
- Participants: 18
- Matches: 77
- Most runs: Stephen Eskinazi (Middlesex) (658)
- Most wickets: Brett Hutton (Nottinghamshire) (22)
- Official website: ecb.co.uk

The 2022 Royal London One-Day Cup tournament was a limited overs cricket competition that formed part of the 2022 domestic cricket season in England and Wales. Matches were contested over 50 overs per side, having List A cricket status, with all eighteen first-class counties competing in the tournament. The tournament began on 2 August 2022, with the final taking place on 17 September 2022 at Trent Bridge in Nottingham. Glamorgan were the defending champions, having won the 2021 tournament. Kent won the tournament, beating Lancashire by 21 runs in the final.

== Teams ==
The teams were placed into the following groups:

- Group A: Durham, Gloucestershire, Leicestershire, Middlesex, Nottinghamshire, Somerset, Surrey, Sussex, Warwickshire
- Group B: Derbyshire, Essex, Glamorgan, Hampshire, Kent, Lancashire, Northamptonshire, Worcestershire, Yorkshire

== Group A ==
=== Fixtures ===
2 August 2022
11:00
Scorecard

Gloucestershire; 264 (48.5 overs)	v	Warwickshire; 265/2 (38.4 overs)
Ben Wells 76 (87); Craig Miles 3/53 (9.5 overs)		Dom Sibley 106* (107); Ollie Price 1/12 (3 overs)

Warwickshire won by 8 wickets
College Ground, Cheltenham
Umpires: Jack Shantry and Paul Pollard

- Warwickshire won the toss and elected to field.
- Kai Smith (Warwickshire) made his List A debut.
- Points: Warwickshire 2, Gloucestershire 0.

2 August 2022
11:00
Scorecard

Nottinghamshire; 290/7 (50 overs)	v	Sussex; 225 (44 overs)
Matthew Montgomery 87 (94); Sean Hunt 2/59 (10 overs)		Tom Alsop 75 (70); Brett Hutton 3/24 (9 overs)

Nottinghamshire won by 65 runs
Trent Bridge, Nottingham
Umpires: Mansoor Qureshi and Rob Bailey

- Nottinghamshire won the toss and elected to bat.
- Brad Currie and Sean Hunt (Sussex) both made their List A debuts.
- Points: Nottinghamshire 2, Sussex 0.

2 August 2022
11:00
Scorecard

Surrey; 246/8 (50 overs)	v	Leicestershire; 248/3 (40 overs)
Ben Geddes 73 (85); Beuran Hendricks 4/39 (10 overs)		Nick Welch 127* (125); Yousef Majid 1/19 (7 overs)

Leicestershire won by 7 wickets
Woodbridge Road, Guildford
Umpires: Ben Debenham and James Tredwell

- Leicestershire won the toss and elected to field.
- Amar Virdi, Josh Blake, Tom Lawes, Yousef Majid (Surrey) and Nathan Bowley (Leicestershire) all made their List A debuts.
- Points: Leicestershire 2, Surrey 0.

4 August 2022
11:00
Scorecard

Durham; 181 (40.2 overs)	v	Surrey; 186/1 (29 overs)
Liam Trevaskis 55 (67); Nick Kimber 2/15 (3 overs)		Cameron Steel 68* (74); Chris Rushworth 1/38 (9 overs)

Surrey won by 9 wickets
Roseworth Terrace, Gosforth
Umpires: Naeem Ashraf and Rob White

- Surrey won the toss and elected to field.
- Oli Gibson, Stanley McAlindon, and Tomas Mackintosh (Durham) all made their List A debuts.
- Points: Surrey 2, Durham 0.

4 August 2022
11:00
Scorecard

Leicestershire; 359/8 (50 overs)	v	Middlesex; 344/9 (50 overs)
Wiaan Mulder 116 (100); Luke Hollman 3/43 (9 overs)		Stephen Eskinazi 56 (51); Wiaan Mulder 4/47 (10 overs)

Leicestershire won by 15 runs
Radlett Cricket Club, Radlett
Umpires: Hassan Adnan and Neil Bainton

- Middlesex won the toss and elected to field.
- Points: Leicestershire 2, Middlesex 0.

4 August 2022
11:00
Scorecard

Somerset; 119 (35.4 overs)	v	Nottinghamshire; 124/0 (11.5 overs)
James Rew 48 (69); Dane Paterson 3/28 (8.4 overs)		Sol Budinger 62* (29)

Nottinghamshire won by 10 wickets
County Ground, Taunton
Umpires: Chris Watts and Surendiran Shanmugham

- Nottinghamshire won the toss and elected to field.
- Points: Nottinghamshire 2, Somerset 0.

5 August 2022
11:00
Scorecard

Sussex; 334/9 (50 overs)	v	Gloucestershire; 283 (44.2 overs)
Delray Rawlins 91 (62); Paul van Meekeren 5/48 (10 overs)		James Bracey 87 (86); Aristides Karvelas 3/35 (7 overs)

Sussex won by 51 runs
County Cricket Ground, Hove
Umpires: Billy Taylor and Tom Lungley

- Gloucestershire won the toss and elected to field.
- Points: Sussex 2, Gloucestershire 0.

7 August 2022
11:00
Scorecard

Durham; 268 (49.2 overs)	v	Middlesex; 271/1 (41.1 overs)
Michael Jones 119 (118); Umesh Yadav 5/33 (9.2 overs)		Stephen Eskinazi 146* (132); Oliver Gibson 1/45 (7.4 overs)

Middlesex won by 9 wickets
Riverside Ground, Chester-le-Street
Umpires: James Middlebrook and Neil Pratt

- Durham won the toss and elected to bat.
- Michael Jones (Durham) scored his maiden century in List A cricket.
- Points: Middlesex 2, Durham 0.

7 August 2022
11:00
Scorecard

Somerset; 199 (47.4 overs)	v	Gloucestershire; 205/5 (42.5 overs)
Lewis Goldsworthy 66 (103); Jack Taylor 4/31 (10 overs)		Jack Taylor 77* (90); Kasey Aldridge 2/43 (7 overs)

Gloucestershire won by 5 wickets
County Ground, Bristol
Umpires: Rob Bailey and Chris Watts

- Somerset won the toss and elected to bat.
- Dominic Goodman (Gloucestershire) made his List A debut.
- Points: Gloucestershire 2, Somerset 0.

7 August 2022
11:00
Scorecard

Warwickshire; 293/5 (50 overs)	v	Surrey; 293 (49.1 overs)
Michael Burgess 93 (78); Conor McKerr 2/79 (10 overs)		Nick Kimber 84 (51); Liam Norwell 3/50 (9.1 overs)

Match tied
The Oval, London
Umpires: Hassan Adnan and Paul Nicholls

- Warwickshire won the toss and elected to bat.
- Points: Warwickshire 1, Surrey 1.

7 August 2022
11:00
Scorecard

Leicestershire; 120 (32.4 overs)	v	Sussex; 123/2 (18.1 overs)
Wiaan Mulder 27 (55); Aristides Karvelas 4/21 (8 overs)		Tom Clark 53* (51); Chris Wright 1/14 (4 overs)

Sussex won by 8 wickets
County Cricket Ground, Hove
Umpires: Ian Blackwell and James Tredwell

- Sussex won the toss and elected to field.
- Points: Sussex 2, Leicestershire 0.

10 August 2022
11:00
Scorecard

Nottinghamshire; 294 (50 overs)	v	Gloucestershire; 298/5 (39.4 overs)
Sol Budinger 89 (56); Paul van Meekeren 3/73 (9 overs)		James Bracey 104* (93); Matt Montgomery 2/48 (7 overs)

Gloucestershire won by 5 wickets
County Ground, Bristol
Umpires: James Middlebrook and Naeem Ashraf

- Nottinghamshire won the toss and elected to bat.
- Benjamin Martindale (Nottinghamshire) made his List A debut.
- Points: Gloucestershire 2, Nottinghamshire 0.

10 August 2022
11:00
Scorecard

Middlesex; 351/7 (50 overs)	v	Surrey; 249 (41.4 overs)
Stephen Eskinazi 182 (136); Conor McKerr 3/38 (9 overs)		Ryan Patel 118 (99); Ethan Bamber 3/46 (10 overs)

Middlesex won by 102 runs
Radlett Cricket Club, Radlett
Umpires: Chris Watts and Paul Baldwin

- Surrey won the toss and elected to field.
- Nathan Barnwell (Surrey) made his List A debut.
- Points: Middlesex 2, Surrey 0.

10 August 2022
11:00
Scorecard

Durham; 342 (49.2 overs)	v	Somerset; 333 (49.2 overs)
Scott Borthwick 88 (67); Sonny Baker 6/46 (10 overs)		Ben Green 157 (84); Oliver Gibson 3/54 (8.2 overs)

Durham won by 9 runs
County Ground, Taunton
Umpires: Anthony Harris and Neil Mallender

- Somerset won the toss and elected to field.
- Jonathan Bushnell (Durham) and Alfie Ogborne (Somerset) both made their List A debuts.
- Ben Green (Somerset) scored his maiden century in List A cricket.
- Points: Durham 2, Somerset 0.

12 August 2022
11:00
Scorecard

Gloucestershire; 367/8 (50 overs)	v	Durham; 361/8 (50 overs)
Chris Dent 117 (105); Oliver Gibson 3/77 (10 overs)		Paul Coughlin 77 (38); Tom Price 4/70 (10 overs)

Gloucestershire won by 6 runs
Riverside Ground, Chester-le-Street
Umpires: David Millns and Jack Shantry

- Durham won the toss and elected to field.
- Points: Gloucestershire 2, Durham 0.

12 August 2022
11:00
Scorecard

Leicestershire; 269 (49.2 overs)	v	Somerset; 224 (50 overs)
Louis Kimber 102 (89); Kasey Aldridge 3/40 (10 overs)		Matt Renshaw 55 (63); Beuran Hendricks 3/36 (10 overs)

Leicestershire won by 45 runs
Grace Road, Leicester
Umpires: Hassan Adnan and Phil Mustard

- Somerset won the toss and elected to field.
- Ollie Sale (Somerset) made his List A debut.
- Louis Kimber (Leicestershire) scored his maiden century in List A cricket.
- Points: Leicestershire 2, Somerset 0.

12 August 2022
11:00
Scorecard

Middlesex; 355 (49.4 overs)	v	Nottinghamshire; 328 (47.4 overs)
Stephen Eskinazi 135 (104); Zak Chappell 3/75 (9.4 overs)		Haseeb Hameed 114 (118); Umesh Yadav 4/54 (8.4 overs)

Middlesex won by 27 runs
Gorse Lane, Grantham
Umpires: Anthony Harris and James Middlebrook

- Nottinghamshire won the toss and elected to field.
- James Hayes (Nottinghamshire) made his List A debut.
- Points: Middlesex 2, Nottinghamshire 0.

12 August 2022
11:00
Scorecard

Warwickshire; 310/6 (50 overs)	v	Sussex; 306/7 (50 overs)
Rob Yates 114 (111); Aristides Karvelas 2/44 (8 overs)		Cheteshwar Pujara 107 (79); Krunal Pandya 3/51 (10 overs)

Warwickshire won by 4 runs
Edgbaston, Birmingham
Umpires: Chris Watts and Simon Widdup

- Warwickshire won the toss and elected to bat.
- Hamza Shaikh (Warwickshire) made his List A debut.
- Points: Warwickshire 2, Sussex 0.

14 August 2022
11:00
Scorecard

Leicestershire; 338/8 (50 overs)	v	Warwickshire; 207 (39.2 overs)
Louis Kimber 78 (68); Krunal Pandya 3/69 (10 overs)		Michael Burgess 38 (41); Chris Wright 3/29 (8.2 overs)

Leicestershire won by 131 runs
Grace Road, Leicester
Umpires: James Middlebrook and Tom Lungley

- Leicestershire won the toss and elected to bat.
- Points: Leicestershire 2, Warwickshire 0.

14 August 2022
11:00
Scorecard

Durham; 226 (45 overs)	v	Nottinghamshire; 227/8 (48 overs)
Liam Trevaskis 59* (74); Liam Patterson-White 5/45 (10 overs)		Matt Montgomery 54 (84); Liam Trevaskis 2/25 (10 overs)

Nottinghamshire won by 2 wickets
Gorse Lane, Grantham
Umpires: Neil Mallender and Sue Redfern

- Durham won the toss and elected to bat.
- Mitchell Killeen (Durham) made his List A debut.
- Points: Nottinghamshire 2, Durham 0.

14 August 2022
11:00
Scorecard

Somerset; 335/6 (50 overs)	v	Middlesex; 336/9 (49.2 overs)
Matt Renshaw 120 (102); Toby Greatwood 2/52 (10 overs)		Pieter Malan 110 (93); Sonny Baker 3/69 (9.2 overs)

Middlesex won by 1 wicket
County Ground, Taunton
Umpires: Chris Watts and James Tredwell

- Middlesex won the toss and elected to field.
- Josh Thomas (Somerset) and Max Harris (Middlesex) both made their List A debuts.
- Points: Middlesex 2, Somerset 0.

14 August 2022
11:00
Scorecard

Sussex; 378/6 (50 overs)	v	Surrey; 162 (31.4 overs)
Cheteshwar Pujara 174 (131); Conor McKerr 2/73 (10 overs)		Ryan Patel 65 (56); Aristides Karvelas 4/35 (8 overs)

Sussex won by 216 runs
County Cricket Ground, Hove
Umpires: Ben Peverall and Rob Bailey

- Surrey won the toss and elected to field.
- Sheridon Gumbs (Surrey) made his List A debut.
- Points: Sussex 2, Surrey 0.

17 August 2022
11:00
Scorecard

Durham; 228/8 (50 overs)	v	Sussex; 229/6 (49.2 overs)
Graham Clark 69 (112); James Coles 3/51 (9 overs)		Ali Orr 60 (70); Liam Trevaskis 2/34 (10 overs)

Sussex won by 4 wickets
Riverside Ground, Chester-le-Street
Umpires: Russell Warren and Steve O'Shaughnessy

- Durham won the toss and elected to bat.
- Points: Sussex 2, Durham 0.

17 August 2022
11:00
Scorecard

Gloucestershire; 262/9 (50 overs)	v	Leicestershire; 263/6 (46 overs)
Marcus Harris 58 (63); Louis Kimber 4/61 (9 overs)		Lewis Hill 82 (75); Zafar Gohar 3/64 (10 overs)

Leicestershire won by 4 wickets
County Ground, Bristol
Umpires: Billy Taylor and Paul Nicholls

- Leicestershire won the toss and elected to field.
- Points: Leicestershire 2, Gloucestershire 0.

17 August 2022
11:00
Scorecard

Surrey; 302/9 (50 overs)	v	Somerset; 68/3 (12 overs)
Nico Reifer 70 (85); Kasey Aldridge 5/50 (10 overs)		Lewis Goldsworthy 22* (20); Tom Lawes 2/20 (5 overs)

Surrey won by 43 runs (DLS method)
The Oval, London
Umpires: Nigel Llong and Surendiran Shanmugham

- Somerset won the toss and elected to field.
- Rain stopped play during Somerset innings.
- No further play was possible and Somerset were 44 runs behind the DLS par score of 112 runs from 12 overs.
- Jack Harding (Somerset) made his List A debut.
- Points: Surrey 2, Somerset 0.

17 August 2022
11:00
Scorecard

Warwickshire; 271/6 (34 overs)	v	Nottinghamshire; 257 (33.1 overs)
Will Rhodes 113 (85); Dane Paterson 2/51 (7 overs)		Haseeb Hameed 51 (48); Will Rhodes 2/35 (5.1 overs)

Warwickshire won by 14 runs
Edgbaston Foundation Ground, Birmingham
Umpires: Paul Pollard and Rob White

- Nottinghamshire won the toss and elected to field.
- The match was reduced to 34 overs per side due to rain.
- Points: Warwickshire 2, Nottinghamshire 0.

19 August 2022
11:00
Scorecard

Middlesex; 374/3 (50 overs)	v	Warwickshire; 246 (46 overs)
Sam Robson 111 (107); Oliver Hannon-Dalby 1/72 (10 overs)		Dom Sibley 89 (101); Luke Hollman 4/34 (8 overs)

Middlesex won by 128 runs
Radlett Cricket Club, Radlett
Umpires: Chris Watts and Jack Shantry

- Warwickshire won the toss and elected to field.
- Points: Middlesex 2, Warwickshire 0.

19 August 2022
11:00
Scorecard

Surrey; 292/9 (50 overs)	v	Gloucestershire; 294/8 (47.3 overs)
Ben Geddes 71 (86); Jack Taylor 3/38 (7 overs)		Jack Taylor 51 (46); Yousef Majid 3/74 (10 overs)

Gloucestershire won by 2 wickets
The Oval, London
Umpires: Ben Debenham and Richard Kettleborough

- Surrey won the toss and elected to bat.
- Ajeet Singh Dale (Gloucestershire) made his List A debut.
- Points: Gloucestershire 2, Surrey 0.

19 August 2022
14:00 (D/N)
Scorecard

Sussex; 397/5 (50 overs)	v	Somerset; 196 (38.2 overs)
Ali Orr 206 (161); Jack Brooks 2/74 (10 overs)		Andrew Umeed 56 (60); James Coles 3/31 (7.2 overs)

Sussex won by 201 runs
County Ground, Taunton
Umpires: Naeem Ashraf and Nick Cook

- Somerset won the toss and elected to field.
- Points: Sussex 2, Somerset 0.

20 August 2022
11:00
Scorecard

Nottinghamshire; 255/9 (47 overs)	v	Leicestershire; 154 (29.1 overs)
Haseeb Hameed 99* (115); Chris Wright 6/35 (10 overs)		Wiaan Mulder 79 (76); Brett Hutton 7/26 (8.1 overs)

Nottinghamshire won by 105 runs (DLS method)
Grace Road, Leicester
Umpires: Mark Newell and Billy Taylor

- Leicestershire won the toss and elected to field.
- The match was reduced to 47 overs per side due to rain.
- Leicestershire were set a revised target of 260 runs from 47 overs.
- Michael Finan (Leicestershire) and Toby Pettman (Nottinghamshire) both made their List A debuts.
- Points: Nottinghamshire 2, Leicestershire 0.

21 August 2022
11:00
Scorecard

Middlesex; 256/9 (50 overs)	v	Gloucestershire; 257/5 (47.1 overs)
Pieter Malan 81 (109); Zafar Gohar 4/38 (10 overs)		Ben Charlesworth 97 (121); Toby Greatwood 1/13 (3 overs)

Gloucestershire won by 5 wickets
Radlett Cricket Club, Radlett
Umpires: Anthony Harris and Richard Kettleborough

- Middlesex won the toss and elected to bat.
- Points: Gloucestershire 2, Middlesex 0.

21 August 2022
11:00
Scorecard

Warwickshire; 275/6 (50 overs)	v	Durham; 227 (45.1 overs)
Dom Sibley 113 (124); Oliver Gibson 3/55 (10 overs)		Graham Clark 70 (102); Oliver Hannon-Dalby 4/39 (9 overs)

Warwickshire won by 48 runs
Edgbaston, Birmingham
Umpires: Jack Shantry and Peter Hartley

- Durham won the toss and elected to field.
- George Maddy (Warwickshire) made his List A debut.
- Points: Warwickshire 2, Durham 0.

23 August 2022
11:00
Scorecard

Durham; 197 (49.3 overs)	v	Leicestershire; 198/8 (46.2 overs)
Stanley McAlindon 50 (60); Wiaan Mulder 3/28 (10 overs)		Arron Lilley 60 (65); Stanley McAlindon 4/29 (10 overs)

Leicestershire won by 2 wickets
Grace Road, Leicester
Umpires: Neil Pratt and Paul Pollard

- Leicestershire won the toss and elected to field.
- Points: Leicestershire 2, Durham 0.

23 August 2022
11:00
Scorecard

Surrey; 181 (39.2 overs)	v	Nottinghamshire; 182/2 (31.5 overs)
Tom Lawes 75 (63); Toby Pettman 4/44 (10 overs)		Ben Slater 82* (98); Nick Kimber 1/30 (5 overs)

Nottinghamshire won by 8 wickets
John Fretwell Sporting Complex, Nettleworth
Umpires: Anthony Harris and Steve O'Shaughnessy

- Nottinghamshire won the toss and elected to field.
- Nottinghamshire 2, Surrey 0.

23 August 2022
11:00
Scorecard

Sussex; 400/4 (50 overs)	v	Middlesex; 243 (38.1 overs)
Tom Alsop 189* (155); Max Harris 3/98 (10 overs)		Joe Cracknell 71 (73); Henry Crocombe 3/33 (7 overs)

Sussex won by 157 runs
County Cricket Ground, Hove
Umpires: Chris Watts and Surendiran Shanmugham

- Middlesex won the toss and elected to field.
- Points: Sussex 2, Middlesex 0.

23 August 2022
11:00
Scorecard

Somerset; 266/5 (50 overs)	v	Warwickshire; 252 (49.5 overs)
Lewis Goldsworthy 111 (116); Liam Norwell 2/44 (10 overs)		Will Rhodes 92 (103); Jack Brooks 4/38 (9.5 overs)

Somerset won by 14 runs
Edgbaston, Birmingham
Umpires: Rob Bailey and Tom Lungley

- Somerset won the toss and elected to bat.
- Points: Somerset 2, Warwickshire 0.

== Group B ==
=== Fixtures ===
2 August 2022
11:00
Scorecard

Derbyshire; 110 (30 overs)	v	Glamorgan; 112/2 (21.5 overs)
Mattie McKiernan 43 (57); Timm van der Gugten 4/41 (10 overs)		Kiran Carlson 54* (53); Ben Aitchison 1/14 (6 overs)

Glamorgan won by 8 wickets
County Ground, Derby
Umpires: Nigel Llong and Simon Widdup

- Glamorgan won the toss and elected to field.
- The match was reduced to 47 overs due to rain.
- Nick Potts (Derbyshire) and Jamie McIlroy (Glamorgan) both made their List A debuts.
- Points: Glamorgan 2, Derbyshire 0.

2 August 2022
11:00
Scorecard

Lancashire	v	Essex

Match abandoned
Sedbergh School, Sedbergh
Umpires: Phil Mustard and Steve O'Shaughnessy

- No toss
- No play was possible due to rain.
- Points: Lancashire 1, Essex 1.

2 August 2022
11:00
Scorecard

Worcestershire; 351/8 (50 overs)	v	Kent; 353/3 (44.5 overs)
Kashif Ali 114 (99); Matt Henry 3/56 (10 overs)		Ollie Robinson 206* (131); Brett D'Oliveira 1/37 (6 overs)

Kent won by 7 wickets
New Road, Worcester
Umpires: Ben Peverall and Neil Bainton

- Worcestershire won the toss and elected to bat.
- Kashif Ali and Ben Gibbon (Worcestershire) both made their List A debuts.
- Kashif Ali (Worcestershire) scored his maiden century in List A cricket.
- Points: Kent 2, Worcestershire 0.

2 August 2022
11:00
Scorecard

Yorkshire; 353/5 (46 overs)	v	Northamptonshire; 320 (44.2 overs)
Will Fraine 143 (107); Nathan Buck 2/66 (9 overs)		Will Young 91 (64); Dom Bess 3/63 (9 overs)

Yorkshire won by 33 runs (DLS method)
Clifton Park Ground, York
Umpires: Peter Hartley and Tom Lungley

- Northamptonshire won the toss and elected to field.
- The match was reduced to 46 overs due to rain.
- Ben Cliff, Harris Sullivan (Yorkshire) and Alex Russell (Northamptonshire) all made their List A debuts.
- Points: Yorkshire 2, Northamptonshire 0.

4 August 2022
11:00
Scorecard

Kent; 304/8 (50 overs)	v	Glamorgan; 308/7 (48.2 overs)
Joey Evison 109 (121); Colin Ingram 2/42 (6 overs)		Colin Ingram 155 (148); George Linde 2/59 (8.2 overs)

Glamorgan won by 3 wickets
Sophia Gardens, Cardiff
Umpires: Anthony Harris and Mark Newell

- Glamorgan won the toss and elected to field.
- Points: Glamorgan 2, Kent 0.

4 August 2022
11:00
Scorecard

Yorkshire; 224 (48.3 overs)	v	Lancashire; 228/3 (41 overs)
Will Fraine 41 (41); Danny Lamb 3/32 (6 overs)		Luke Wells 88 (67); Ben Coad 1/19 (10 overs)

Lancashire won by 7 wickets
Clifton Park Ground, York
Umpires: Jack Shantry and Neil Pratt

- Lancashire won the toss and elected to field.
- Points: Lancashire 2, Yorkshire 0.

5 August 2022
11:00
Scorecard

Hampshire; 236 (49.3 overs)	v	Worcestershire; 192 (45 overs)
Fletcha Middleton 49 (68); Joe Leach 3/41 (9 overs)		Ed Barnard 85* (105); Ian Holland 3/17 (10 overs)

Hampshire won by 44 runs
Rose Bowl, Southampton
Umpires: Ian Blackwell and Alex Wharf

- Worcestershire won the toss and elected to field.
- Toby Albert (Hampshire) and Henry Cullen (Worcestershire) both made their List A debuts.
- Points: Hampshire 2, Worcestershire 0.

5 August 2022
14:00 (D/N)
Scorecard

Derbyshire; 318/6 (50 overs)	v	Essex; 226 (44.2 overs)
Brooke Guest 88 (79); Aron Nijjar 2/49 (10 overs)		Jamal Richards 46 (44); Ben Aitchison 2/21 (8 overs)

Derbyshire won by 92 runs
County Ground, Chelmsford
Umpires: Nigel Llong and Russell Warren

- Essex won the toss and elected to field.
- Robin Das and Jamal Richards (Essex) both made their List A debuts.
- Points: Derbyshire 2, Essex 0.

7 August 2022
11:00
Scorecard

Hampshire; 396/5 (50 overs)	v	Kent; 233 (39.2 overs)
Tom Prest 181 (138); Nathan Gilchrist 2/65 (8 overs)		Alex Blake 62 (43); Jack Campbell 4/44 (7.2 overs)

Hampshire won by 163 runs
County Cricket Ground, Beckenham
Umpires: Mark Newell and Mansoor Qureshi

- Kent won the toss and elected to field.
- Points: Hampshire 2, Kent 0.

7 August 2022
11:00
Scorecard

Lancashire; 221/4 (50 overs)	v	Derbyshire; 182 (46.2 overs)
Steven Croft 87* (106); Alex Thomson 3/25 (5 overs)		Shan Masood 82 (117); Will Williams 4/20 (8.2 overs)

Lancashire won by 39 runs
Old Trafford Cricket Ground, Manchester
Umpires: Richard Illingworth and Ben Peverall

- Lancashire won the toss and elected to bat.
- Points: Lancashire 2, Derbyshire 0.

7 August 2022
11:00
Scorecard

Essex; 343/9 (50 overs)	v	Northamptonshire; 344/7 (49.4 overs)
Feroze Khushi 118 (93); Nathan Buck 5/59 (10 overs)		Saif Zaib 136 (101); Aaron Beard 3/65 (9.4 overs)

Northamptonshire won by 3 wickets
County Ground, Northampton
Umpires: David Millns and Simon Widdup

- Essex won the toss and elected to bat.
- Saif Zaib (Northamptonshire) scored his maiden century in List A cricket.
- Points: Northamptonshire 2, Essex 0.

7 August 2022
11:00
Scorecard

Worcestershire; 246/8 (50 overs)	v	Yorkshire; 247/6 (47.2 overs)
Ben Cox 70 (46); Matthew Waite 3/21 (8 overs)		George Hill 130 (131); Dillon Pennington 2/43 (10 overs)

Yorkshire won by 4 wickets
North Marine Road, Scarborough
Umpires: Phil Mustard and Surendiran Shanmugam

- Yorkshire won the toss and elected to field.
- George Hill (Yorkshire) scored his maiden century in List A cricket.
- Points: Yorkshire 2, Worcestershire 0.

9 August 2022
11:00
Scorecard

Hampshire; 199 (40.2 overs)	v	Northamptonshire; 188 (40.2 overs)
Tom Prest 51 (55); Rob Keogh 3/32 (7 overs)		Rob Keogh 74 (83); Jack Campbell 3/17 (9 overs)

Hampshire won by 11 runs
Newclose County Cricket Ground, Isle of Wight
Umpires: Hassan Adnan and Mark Newell

- Hampshire won the toss and elected to bat.
- Gus Miller (Northamptonshire) made his List A debut.
- Points: Hampshire 2, Northamptonshire 0.

10 August 2022
11:00
Scorecard

Yorkshire; 257/9 (50 overs)	v	Glamorgan; 234 (48.5 overs)
Harry Duke 87 (117); Jamie McIlroy 2/37 (10 overs)		Kiran Carlson 64 (78); Jack Shutt 4/46 (10 overs)

Yorkshire won by 23 runs
Sophia Gardens, Cardiff
Umpires: Ben Debenham and Russell Warren

- Yorkshire won the toss and elected to bat.
- Points: Yorkshire 2, Glamorgan 0.

10 August 2022
14:00 (D/N)
Scorecard

Worcestershire; 248/9 (50 overs)	v	Lancashire; 249/4 (45 overs)
Kashif Ali 61 (48); Luke Wells 3/42 (10 overs)		Rob Jones 85* (101); Jake Libby 2/47 (8 overs)

Lancashire won by 6 wickets
Old Trafford Cricket Ground, Manchester
Umpires: Jack Shantry and Richard Illingworth

- Worcestershire won the toss and elected to bat.
- Reeve Evitts (Worcestershire) and George Bell (Lancashire) both made their List A debuts.
- Points: Lancashire 2, Worcestershire 0.

11 August 2022
14:00 (D/N)
Scorecard

Essex; 331 (49.2 overs)	v	Kent; 149 (33.2 overs)
Tom Westley 109 (101); Joey Evison 3/62 (10 overs)		Ben Compton 52 (82); Shane Snater 5/29 (6.2 overs)

Essex won by 182 runs
County Ground, Chelmsford
Umpires: Billy Taylor and Ian Blackwell

- Essex won the toss and elected to bat.
- Points: Essex 2, Kent 0.

12 August 2022
11:00
Scorecard

Derbyshire; 246/9 (50 overs)	v	Hampshire; 247/8 (48.1 overs)
Brooke Guest 82 (101); Keith Barker 2/34 (10 overs)		Toby Albert 84 (96); Ben Aitchison 4/39 (10 overs)

Hampshire won by 2 wickets
County Ground, Derby
Umpires: Naeem Ashraf and Neil Pratt

- Hampshire won the toss and elected to field.
- Points: Hampshire 2, Derbyshire 0.

12 August 2022
11:00
Scorecard

Glamorgan; 221 (47.3 overs)	v	Northamptonshire; 225/4 (35.5 overs)
David Lloyd 65 (72); Saif Zaib 4/23 (10 overs)		Ricardo Vasconcelos 104 (105); Kiran Carlson 4/41 (7.5 overs)

Northamptonshire won by 6 wickets
County Ground, Northampton
Umpires: Neil Mallender and Paul Nicholls

- Glamorgan won the toss and elected to bat.
- Points: Northamptonshire 2, Glamorgan 0.

14 August 2022
11:00
Scorecard

Essex; 341 (49.3 overs)	v	Glamorgan; 238 (43.5 overs)
Feroze Khushi 104 (88); Andrew Salter 3/72 (10 overs)		Sam Northeast 70 (81); Luc Benkenstein 6/42 (10 overs)

Essex won by 103 runs
County Ground, Chelmsford
Umpires: Anthony Harris and Mark Newell

- Essex won the toss and elected to bat.
- Prem Sisodiya and Thomas Bevan (Glamorgan) both made their List A debuts.
- Points: Essex 2, Glamorgan 0.

14 August 2022
11:00
Scorecard

Lancashire; 183 (45.3 overs)	v	Hampshire; 186/8 (48.2 overs)
Rob Jones 84 (109); John Turner 5/25 (9.3 overs)		Toby Albert 65* (73); Liam Hurt 3/25 (10 overs)

Hampshire won by 2 wickets
Rose Bowl, West End, Southampton
Umpires: Paul Pollard and Surendiran Shanmugham

- Lancashire won the toss and elected to bat.
- Dominic Kelly (Hampshire) made his List A debut.
- Points: Hampshire 2, Lancashire 0.

14 August 2022
11:00
Scorecard

Northamptonshire; 210 (46.5 overs)	v	Kent; 213/6 (43 overs)
Emilio Gay 49 (47); Hamidullah Qadri 4/36 (10 overs)		Ben Compton 87 (119); Rob Keogh 2/35 (9 overs)

Kent won by 4 wickets
St Lawrence Ground, Canterbury
Umpires: Hassan Adnan and Naeem Ashraf

- Northamptonshire won the toss and elected to bat.
- Points: Kent 2, Northamptonshire 0.

14 August 2022
11:00
Scorecard

Derbyshire; 312/9 (50 overs)	v	Worcestershire; 265 (48.5 overs)
Luis Reece 136 (142); Adam Finch 3/54 (10 overs)		Jake Libby 126 (127); Sam Conners 3/37 (8 overs)

Derbyshire won by 47 runs
New Road, Worcester
Umpires: Jack Shantry and Nick Cook

- Worcestershire won the toss and elected to field.
- Archie Harrison (Derbyshire) made his List A debut.
- Points: Derbyshire 2, Worcestershire 0.

17 August 2022
11:00
Scorecard

Derbyshire	v	Kent

Match abandoned
County Ground, Derby
Umpires: Anthony Harris and Peter Hartley

- No toss.
- No play was possible due to rain.
- Points: Derbyshire 1, Kent 1.

17 August 2022
11:00
Scorecard

Essex; 240 (46.1 overs)	v	Yorkshire; 76/6 (19 overs)
Grant Roelofsen 90 (97); Matthew Waite 3/23 (7.1 overs)		George Hill 19* (35); Shane Snater 3/29 (5 overs)

Essex won by 88 runs (DLS method)
County Ground, Chelmsford
Umpires: Mansoor Qureshi and Nick Cook

- Essex won the toss and elected to bat.
- Rain stopped play during Yorkshire innings.
- No further play was possible and Yorkshire were 89 runs behind the DLS par score of 165 runs from 19 overs.
- Points: Essex 2, Yorkshire 0.

17 August 2022
11:00
Scorecard

Glamorgan; 177 (45.1 overs)	v	Lancashire; 180/1 (36 overs)
Colin Ingram 54 (75); Tom Bailey 3/22 (8.1 overs)		Keaton Jennings 77* (101); Kiran Carlson 1/28 (6 overs)

Lancashire won by 9 wickets
The Gnoll, Neath
Umpires: Jack Shantry and Paul Baldwin

- Lancashire won the toss and elected to field.
- Points: Lancashire 2, Glamorgan 0.

17 August 2022
11:00
Scorecard

Northamptonshire; 248/4 (39 overs)	v	Worcestershire; 257/4 (38.2 overs)
Will Young 104* (94); Ben Gibbon 1/40 (7 overs)		Azhar Ali 130 (97); Jack White 2/54 (7.2 overs)

Worcestershire won by 6 wickets (DLS method)
County Ground, Northampton
Umpires: Ian Blackwell and Tom Lungley

- Worcestershire won the toss and elected to field.
- The match was reduced to 39 overs per side due to rain.
- Worcestershire were set a revised target of 254 runs from 39 overs.
- Points: Worcestershire 2, Northamptonshire 0.

19 August 2022
11:00
Scorecard

Hampshire; 228/9 (50 overs)	v	Glamorgan; 229/3 (31.4 overs)
Nick Gubbins 93 (124); Andy Gorvin 2/41 (9 overs)		Thomas Bevan 134 (103); Scott Currie 2/64 (7 overs)

Glamorgan won by 7 wickets
The Gnoll, Neath
Umpires: Rob White and Sue Redfern

- Glamorgan won the toss and elected to field.
- Thomas Bevan (Glamorgan) scored his maiden century in List A cricket.
- Points: Glamorgan 2, Hampshire 0.

19 August 2022
11:00
Scorecard

Yorkshire; 282/6 (45 overs)	v	Kent; 297/7 (45 overs)
Harry Duke 85 (101); Joe Denly 3/37 (9 overs)		Ben Compton 81 (98); Matthew Waite 3/53 (9 overs)

Kent won by 3 wickets (DLS method)
St Lawrence Ground, Canterbury
Umpires: Russell Warren and Surendiran Shanmugham

- Kent won the toss and elected to field.
- The match was reduced to 45 overs per side due to rain.
- Kent were set a revised target of 297 runs from 45 overs.
- Finlay Bean (Yorkshire) made his List A debut.
- Points: Kent 2, Yorkshire 0.

19 August 2022
11:00
Scorecard

Northamptonshire; 370/4 (50 overs)	v	Lancashire; 372/6 (48.2 overs)
Emilio Gay 131 (117); George Balderson 1/44 (6 overs)		Keaton Jennings 125 (105); James Sales 2/65 (10 overs)

Lancashire won by 4 wickets
Stanley Park, Blackpool
Umpires: Neil Pratt and Peter Hartley

- Lancashire won the toss and elected to field.
- Emilio Gay (Northamptonshire) scored his maiden century in List A cricket.
- Points: Lancashire 2, Northamptonshire 0.

19 August 2022
11:00
Scorecard

Essex; 279/9 (50 overs)	v	Worcestershire; 280/3 (48.4 overs)
Robin Das 63 (64); Dillon Pennington 3/42 (10 overs)		Taylor Cornall 97 (116); Luc Benkenstein 2/58 (9 overs)

Worcestershire won by 7 wickets
New Road, Worcester
Umpires: Graham Lloyd and Neil Mallender

- Worcestershire won the toss and elected to field.
- Points: Worcestershire 2, Essex 0.

21 August 2022
11:00
Scorecard

Derbyshire; 109 (42.4 overs)	v	Yorkshire; 110/9 (31.5 overs)
Harry Came 19 (58); Jack Shutt 2/5 (2.4 overs)		Matthew Waite 23 (17); Sam Conners 5/28 (10 overs)

Yorkshire won by 1 wicket
Queen's Park, Chesterfield
Umpires: Steve O'Shaughnessy and Surendiran Shanmugham

- Yorkshire won the toss and elected to field.
- Points: Yorkshire 2, Derbyshire 0.

21 August 2022
11:00
Scorecard

Essex; 257/8 (50 overs)	v	Hampshire; 260/7 (48.2 overs)
Shane Snater 64 (63); Scott Currie 2/46 (10 overs)		Tom Prest 76 (104); Shane Snater 3/46 (9 overs)

Hampshire won by 3 wickets
Rose Bowl, Southampton
Umpires: Naeem Ashraf and Rob Bailey

- Essex won the toss and elected to bat.
- Points: Hampshire 2, Essex 0.

23 August 2022
11:00
Scorecard

Lancashire; 295/9 (50 overs)	v	Kent; 298/8 (49.5 overs)
George Balderson 106* (87); Nathan Gilchrist 3/52 (10 overs)		Alex Blake 81 (78); Jack Blatherwick 3/57 (10 overs)

Kent won by 2 wickets
St Lawrence Ground, Canterbury
Umpires: Ian Blackwell and Jack Shantry

- Kent won the toss and elected to field.
- Points: Kent 2, Lancashire 0.

23 August 2022
11:00
Scorecard

Northamptonshire; 311/7 (50 overs)	v	Derbyshire; 312/2 (48.5 overs)
Lewis McManus 107 (111); Ben Aitchison 2/49 (10 overs)		Luis Reece 106 (125); Tom Taylor 1/55 (8 overs)

Derbyshire won by 8 wickets
County Ground, Northampton
Umpires: Alex Wharf and Hassan Adnan

- Northamptonshire won the toss and elected to bat.
- Points: Derbyshire 2, Northamptonshire 0.

23 August 2022
11:00
Scorecard

Glamorgan; 356/3 (50 overs)	v	Worcestershire; 337/9 (50 overs)
Sam Northeast 177* (148); Joe Leach 2/32 (7 overs)		Ben Cox 84* (78); Prem Sisodiya 3/76 (10 overs)

Glamorgan won by 19 runs
New Road, Worcester
Umpires: Nick Cook and Rob White

- Worcestershire won the toss and elected to field.
- Points: Glamorgan 2, Worcestershire 0.

23 August 2022
11:00
Scorecard

Hampshire; 313/9 (50 overs)	v	Yorkshire; 241 (45.3 overs)
Aneurin Donald 76 (31); Matt Revis 4/77 (9 overs)		Tom Loten 43* (42); John Turner 5/41 (8.3 overs)

Hampshire won by 72 runs
North Marine Road, Scarborough
Umpires: David Millns and Naeem Ashraf

- Yorkshire won the toss and elected to field.
- Points: Hampshire 2, Yorkshire 0.

== Standings ==
=== Group A ===
Pos	Team	Pld	W	L	T	NR	Ded	Pts	NRR
1	Sussex	8	6	2	0	0	0	12	1.929
2	Leicestershire	8	6	2	0	0	0	12	0.039
3	Nottinghamshire	8	5	3	0	0	0	10	1.143
4	Middlesex	8	5	3	0	0	0	10	0.322
5	Gloucestershire	8	5	3	0	0	0	10	0.027
6	Warwickshire	8	4	3	1	0	0	9	−0.369
7	Surrey	8	2	5	1	0	0	5	−0.977
8	Somerset	8	1	7	0	0	0	2	−1.636
9	Durham (Note: Durham were deducted 2 points for repeated disciplinary offences.)	8	1	7	0	0	2	0	−0.651

Source: BBC Sport, ECB, Cricinfo.
Notes:
- Advanced directly to the semi-finals
- Advanced to the quarter-finals

=== Group B ===
Pos	Team	Pld	W	L	T	NR	Ded	Pts	NRR
1	Hampshire	8	7	1	0	0	0	14	0.595
2	Lancashire	8	5	2	0	1	0	11	0.555
3	Kent	8	4	3	0	1	0	9	−0.818
4	Glamorgan	8	4	4	0	0	0	8	−0.042
5	Yorkshire	8	4	4	0	0	0	8	−0.126
6	Essex	8	3	4	0	1	0	7	0.810
7	Derbyshire (Note: Derbyshire were deducted 2 points for use of a non-conforming bat against Hampshire.)	8	3	4	0	1	2	5	−0.351
8	Northamptonshire	8	2	6	0	0	0	4	−0.067
9	Worcestershire	8	2	6	0	0	0	4	−0.452

Source: BBC Sport, ECB, Cricinfo.
Notes:
- Advanced directly to the semi-finals
- Advanced to the quarter-finals

== Knockout stage ==
The winner of each group progressed straight to the semi-finals with the second and third placed teams playing a play-off match against a team from the other group which made up the play-offs. The winner of each play-off played one of the group winners in the semi-finals.

Quarter-finals
A2	Leicestershire	244
B3	Kent	325/8
B2	Lancashire	341/7
A3	Nottinghamshire	338/8

Semi-finals
B1	Hampshire	310/9
QF2	Kent	313/7
A1	Sussex	254
QF1	Lancashire	319/8

Final
SF1	Kent	306/6
SF2	Lancashire	285

=== Quarter-finals ===
26 August 2022
11:00
Scorecard

Kent; 325/8 (50 overs)	v	Leicestershire; 244 (42.4 overs)
Joe Denly 65 (51); Beuran Hendricks 2/35 (10 overs)		Wiaan Mulder 81 (71); Grant Stewart 4/42 (8.4 overs)

Kent won by 81 runs
Grace Road, Leicester
Umpires: Neil Pratt and Paul Baldwin

- Leicestershire won the toss and elected to field.

26 August 2022
11:00
Scorecard

Nottinghamshire; 338/8 (50 overs)	v	Lancashire; 341/7 (48.3 overs)
Ben Slater 104 (122); Danny Lamb 3/79 (10 overs)		Steven Croft 115* (105); Brett Hutton 3/57 (8 overs)

Lancashire won by 3 wickets
Stanley Park, Blackpool
Umpires: Rob White and Steve O'Shaughnessy

- Lancashire won the toss and elected to field.

=== Semi-finals ===
30 August 2022
11:00
Scorecard

Hampshire; 310/9 (50 overs)	v	Kent; 313/7 (49 overs)
Nick Gubbins 75 (84); Joe Denly 2/48 (7 overs)		Ollie Robinson 95 (89); Jack Campbell 3/72 (10 overs)

Kent won by 3 wickets
Rose Bowl, Southampton
Umpires: David Millns and James Middlebrook

- Kent won the toss and elected to field.

30 August 2022
11:00
Scorecard

Lancashire; 319/8 (50 overs)	v	Sussex; 254 (46.3 overs)
Dane Vilas 121 (99); Fynn Hudson-Prentice 3/43 (7 overs)		Ali Orr 71 (65); Liam Hurt 3/43 (10 overs)

Lancashire won by 65 runs
County Cricket Ground, Hove
Umpires: Rob Bailey and Peter Hartley

- Lancashire won the toss and elected to bat.

== Final ==
17 September 2022
11:00
Scorecard

Kent; 306/6 (50 overs)	v	Lancashire; 285 (48.4 overs)
Joey Evison 97 (111); Tom Bailey 2/46 (10 overs)		Keaton Jennings 72 (62); Grant Stewart 3/42 (7 overs)

Kent won by 21 runs
Trent Bridge, Nottingham
Umpires: Paul Pollard and Russell Warren
Player of the match: Joey Evison (Kent)

- Kent won the toss and elected to bat.
