= 2023 T20 Blast =

Cricket tournament

2023 Vitality Blast
- Dates: 20 May – 15 July 2023
- Administrator: England and Wales Cricket Board
- Cricket format: Twenty20
- Tournament format(s): Group stage and knockout
- Champions: Somerset (2nd title)
- Participants: 18
- Matches: 133
- Most runs: James Vince (670) (Hampshire Hawks)
- Most wickets: Matt Henry (31) (Somerset)
- Official website: Vitality Blast

The 2023 Vitality Blast was the twenty-first edition of the T20 Blast currently known as the Vitality Blast, a professional Twenty20 cricket league played in England and Wales. The tournament was held from 20 May to 15 July 2023. It was run by the England and Wales Cricket Board (ECB) and was branded as the Vitality Blast due to the tournament's sponsorship. The Hampshire Hawks were the defending champions, having won their third title during the previous season. On 30 November 2022, the ECB announced the fixtures for the tournament.

Somerset and the Hampshire Hawks won their home quarter-finals, while the Essex Eagles and Surrey also secured a place at Finals day with away wins against the Birmingham Bears and Lancashire Lightning respectively, thus producing an all South Group finals for only the second time; the last occurrence being in 2021. In the final, Somerset beat the Essex Eagles by 14 runs to win their second title after an 18-year wait. Somerset won 15 of their 17 fixtures in the 2023 Vitality Blast, setting a new domestic T20 competition record for the number of wins in a season.

== Format ==
The playing format is the same as the previous season, where groups remain the same with the familiar North and South split, while each county will play 14 group-stage matches, seven at home and seven away.

== Teams ==
The teams are divided into the following groups:

- North Group: Birmingham Bears, Derbyshire Falcons, Durham, Lancashire Lightning, Leicestershire Foxes, Northants Steelbacks, Notts Outlaws, Worcestershire Rapids, Yorkshire Vikings
- South Group: Essex Eagles, Glamorgan, Gloucestershire, Hampshire Hawks, Kent Spitfires, Middlesex, Somerset, Surrey, Sussex Sharks

== North Group ==
Pos	Team	Pld	W	L	T	NR	Pts	NRR
1	Birmingham Bears	14	11	3	0	0	22	0.819
2	Lancashire Lightning	14	8	5	0	1	17	0.427
3	Worcestershire Rapids	14	8	5	1	0	17	0.349
4	Notts Outlaws	14	8	6	0	0	16	−0.222
5	Derbyshire Falcons	14	6	7	1	0	13	0.397
6	Northants Steelbacks	14	6	8	0	0	12	0.274
7	Durham	14	4	7	2	1	11	0.077
8	Yorkshire Vikings	14	6	6	0	2	10	−0.737
9	Leicestershire Foxes	14	2	12	0	0	4	−1.402

Source: Cricinfo

Advanced to the Quarter-finals

- Yorkshire Vikings deducted 4 points on 28 July

20 May 2023
Scorecard

Derbyshire Falcons; 179/5 (20 overs)	v	Lancashire Lightning; 183/6 (19.2 overs)
Wayne Madsen 50 (35); Luke Wood 3/31 (4 overs)		Luke Wells 66 (35); Zak Chappell 2/33 (4 overs)

Lancashire Lightning won by 4 wickets.
Edgbaston, Birmingham
Umpires: Russell Warren and Alex Wharf
Player of the match: Luke Wells (Lancashire Lightning)

- Lancashire Lightning won the toss and elected to field.

20 May 2023 (D/N)
Scorecard

Birmingham Bears; 200/6 (20 overs)	v	Yorkshire Vikings; 166 (19.5 overs)
Sam Hain 83* (45); Matt Revis 2/25 (4 overs)		Dawid Malan 43 (29); Henry Brookes 4/32 (3.5 overs)

Birmingham Bears won by 34 runs
Edgbaston, Birmingham
Umpires: Mike Burns and Graham Lloyd
Player of the match: Sam Hain (Birmingham Bears)

- Yorkshire Vikings won the toss and elected to field.
- Jafer Chohan (Yorkshire) made his T20 debut.

24 May 2023 (D/N)
Scorecard

Worcestershire Rapids; 196/9 (20 overs)	v	Northants Steelbacks; 181/8 (20 overs)
Adam Hose 61 (40); Tom Taylor 3/42 (4 overs)		Tom Taylor 44* (26); Usama Mir 3/21 (4 overs)

Worcestershire Rapids won by 15 runs
County Cricket Ground, Northampton
Umpires: Paul Pollard and Russell Warren

- Worcestershire Rapids won the toss and elected to bat.

25 May 2023 (D/N)
Scorecard

Leicestershire Foxes; 99 (18.5 overs)	v	Lancashire Lightning; 105/2 (11.3 overs)
Wiaan Mulder 25 (24); Luke Wood 3/11 (4 overs)		Steven Croft 46* (34); Rehan Ahmed 1/26 (3 overs)

Lancashire Lighting won by 8 wickets
Old Trafford, Manchester
Umpires: Graham Lloyd and Neil Mallender

- Leicestershire Foxes won the toss and elected to bat.

26 May 2023 (D/N)
Scorecard

Leicestershire Foxes; 166/7 (20 overs)	v	Birmingham Bears; 167/5 (17.3 overs)
Nick Welch 30 (14); Danny Briggs 3/15 (4 overs)		Sam Hain 65* (43); Callum Parkinson 4/33 (4 overs)

Birmingham Bears won by 5 wickets
Grace Road, Leicester
Umpires: James Middlebrook and Chris Watts

- Leicestershire Foxes won the toss and elected to bat.

26 May 2023 (D/N)
Scorecard

Northants Steelbacks; 137 (20 overs)	v	Durham; 141/0 (13.2 overs)
Ricardo Vasconcelos 52 (41); Nathan Sowter 5/15 (4 overs)		Graham Clark 102* (49)

Durham won by 10 wickets
County Cricket Ground, Northampton
Umpires: David Millns and Surendiran Shanmugam

- Northants Steelbacks won the toss and elected to bat.

26 May 2023 (D/N)
Scorecard

Derbyshire Falcons; 178/6 (20 overs)	v	Notts Outlaws; 182/6 (17 overs)
Wayne Madsen 61 (31); Steven Mullaney 2/37 (3 overs)		Joe Clarke 68 (29); George Scrimshaw 3/52 (4 overs)

Notts Outlaws won by 4 wickets
Trent Bridge, Nottingham
Umpires: Neil Pratt and Steve O'Shaughnessy

- Derbyshire Falcons won the toss and elected to bat.

26 May 2023 (D/N)
Scorecard

Yorkshire Vikings; 175/9 (20 overs)	v	Worcestershire Rapids; 177/8 (19.5 overs)
Matt Revis 42 (31); Pat Brown 3/28 (4 overs)		Adam Hose 44 (26); David Wiese 3/18 (4 overs)

Worcestershire Rapids won by 2 wickets
New Road, Worcester
Umpires: Richard Illingworth and Alex Wharf

- Yorkshire Vikings won the toss and elected to bat.

27 May 2023
Scorecard

Lancashire Lightning; 208/4 (20 overs)	v	Notts Outlaws; 186/5 (20 overs)
Daryl Mitchell 85* (41); Samit Patel 2/41 (4 overs)		Colin Munro 60 (29); Luke Wood 2/29 (4 overs)

Lancashire Lightning won by 22 runs
Old Trafford, Manchester
Umpires: Hassan Adnan and Peter Hartley
Player of the match: Daryl Mitchell (Lancashire Lightning)

- Lancashire Lightning won the toss and elected to bat.

28 May 2023
Scorecard

Durham; 217/3 (20 overs)	v	Yorkshire Vikings; 189/7 (20 overs)
Alex Lees 90 (53); Matthew Fisher 1/24 (3 overs)		Jonny Tattersall 39 (33); Ben Raine 3/27 (4 overs)

Durham won by 28 runs
Headingley, Leeds
Umpires: David Millns and Tom Lungley

- Yorkshire Vikings won the toss and elected to field.

29 May 2023
Scorecard

Lancashire Lightning; 98 (14.5 overs)	v	Birmingham Bears; 99/3 (14.2 overs)
Steven Croft 22 (13); Danny Briggs 4/15 (3.5 overs)		Alex Davies 51* (39); Luke Wells 1/9 (2 overs)

Birmingham Bears won by 7 wickets
Edgbaston, Birmingham
Umpires: Richard Illingworth and Paul Pollard
Player of the match: Dan Mousley (Birmingham Bears)

- Lancashire Lightning won the toss and elected to bat.

29 May 2023
Scorecard

Derbyshire Falcons; 151/6 (20 overs)	v	Northants Steelbacks; 152/4 (18 overs)
Wayne Madsen 57 (46); Tom Taylor 2/31 (4 overs)		Saif Zaib 37* (22); Zaman Khan 2/17 (3 overs)

Northants Steelbacks won by 6 wickets
County Cricket Ground, Derby
Umpires: James Middlebrook and Neil Pratt

- Northants Steelbacks won the toss and elected to field.

29 May 2023
Scorecard

Durham; 168/6 (20 overs)	v	Notts Outlaws; 171/5 (19.2 overs)
Ollie Robinson 50 (38); Steven Mullaney 3/28 (4 overs)		Alex Hales 65* (46); Ben Raine 2/15 (4 overs)

Notts Outlaws won by 5 wickets
Riverside Ground, Chester-le-Street
Umpires: Peter Hartley and Neil Mallender
Player of the match: Alex Hales (Notts Outlaws)

- Notts Outlaws won the toss and elected to field.

29 May 2023
Scorecard

Worcestershire Rapids; 183/7 (20 overs)	v	Leicestershire Foxes; 150/9 (20 overs)
Kashif Ali 69 (44); Naseem Shah 2/32 (4 overs)		Rishi Patel 42 (29); Pat Brown 3/25 (3 overs)

Worcestershire Rapids won by 33 runs
New Road, Worcester
Umpires: Ian Blackwell and Alex Wharf

- Worcestershire Rapids won the toss and elected to bat.

30 May 2023 (D/N)
Scorecard

Yorkshire Vikings; 182/7 (20 overs)	v	Notts Outlaws; 174/4 (20 overs)
Dawid Malan 95* (56); Jack Brooks 4/51 (4 overs)		Alex Hales 53 (35); David Wiese 2/32 (4 overs)

Yorkshire Vikings won by 8 runs
Trent Bridge, Nottingham
Umpires: Tom Lungley and Steve O'Shaughnessy

- Yorkshire Vikings won the toss and elected to bat.

31 May 2023 (D/N)
Scorecard

Birmingham Bears; 202/6 (20 overs)	v	Northants Steelbacks; 181/7 (20 overs)
Rob Yates 71 (53); Freddie Heldreich 2/32 (4 overs)		Ricardo Vasconcelos 65 (39); Craig Miles 4/29 (4 overs)

Birmingham Bears won by 21 runs
County Cricket Ground, Northampton
Umpires: James Middlebrook and Paul Pollard
Player of the match: Rob Yates (Birmingham Bears)

- Northants Steelbacks won the toss and elected to field.

1 June 2023 (D/N)
Scorecard

Derbyshire Falcons; 189/5 (20 overs)	v	Leicestershire Foxes; 187/5 (20 overs)
Wayne Madsen 109* (61); Rehan Ahmed 2/20 (4 overs)		Colin Ackermann 59* (38); Zak Chappell 2/39 (4 overs)

Derbyshire Falcons won by 2 runs
Grace Road, Leicester
Umpires: Tom Lungley and Neil Mallender

- Leicestershire Foxes won the toss and elected to field.

1 June 2023 (N)
Scorecard

Yorkshire Vikings; 195/6 (20 overs)	v	Lancashire Lightning; 180/8 (20 overs)
Dawid Malan 83 (50); Colin de Grandhomme 3/24 (4 overs)		Tom Hartley 39 (21); David Wiese 2/31 (4 overs)

Yorkshire Vikings won by 15 runs
Headingley, Leeds
Umpires: Peter Hartley and Steve O'Shaughnessy
Player of the match: Dawid Malan (Yorkshire Vikings)

- Lancashire Lightning won the toss and elected to field.

2 June 2023 (D/N)
Scorecard

Derbyshire Falcons; 174/5 (20 overs)	v	Birmingham Bears; 157/9 (20 overs)
Wayne Madsen 71* (52); Glenn Maxwell 2/19 (4 overs)		Dan Mousley 36 (33); Zak Chappell 3/32 (4 overs)

Derbyshire Falcons won by 17 runs
County Cricket Ground, Derby
Umpires: Naeem Ashraf and Paul Pollard

- Birmingham Bears won the toss and elected to field.

2 June 2023 (D/N)
Scorecard

Lancashire Lightning; 152/9 (20 overs)	v	Durham; 153/4 (18.2 overs)
Steven Croft 34 (30); Nathan Sowter 2/18 (4 overs)		Michael Jones 43 (33); Liam Livingstone 2/30 (4 overs)

Durham won by 6 wickets
Riverside Ground, Chester-le-Street
Umpires: James Middlebrook and Neil Pratt

- Lancashire Lightning won the toss and elected to bat.

2 June 2023 (D/N)
Scorecard

Leicestershire Foxes; 164/8 (20 overs)	v	Northants Steelbacks; 168/2 (18.5 overs)
Louis Kimber 41 (27); Ben Sanderson 3/25 (4 overs)		Chris Lynn 110* (68); Naseem Shah 1/20 (4 overs)

Northants Steelbacks won by 8 wickets
County Cricket Ground, Northampton
Umpires: Hassan Adnan and Neil Bainton

- Leicestershire Foxes won the toss and elected to bat.
- Josh Hull (Leicestershire Foxes) made his T20 debut.

2 June 2023 (D/N)
Scorecard

Worcestershire Rapids; 226/5 (20 overs)	v	Notts Outlaws; 170 (18.2 overs)
Michael Bracewell 55 (27); Steven Mullaney 2/28 (4 overs)		Alex Hales 71 (35); Brett D'Oliveira 4/11 (2 overs)

Worcestershire Rapids won by 56 runs
Trent Bridge, Nottingham
Umpires: Paul Baldwin and Surendiran Shanmugam

- Notts Outlaws won the toss and elected to field.

3 June 2023 (D/N)
Scorecard

Notts Outlaws; 214/3 (20 overs)	v	Birmingham Bears; 203/9 (20 overs)
Joe Clarke 89* (53); Henry Brookes 2/34 (4 overs)		Sam Hain 97* (52); Shaheen Afridi 3/39 (4 overs)

Notts Outlaws won by 11 runs
Edgbaston, Birmingham
Umpires: Tom Lungley and Rob White

- Birmingham Bears won the toss and elected to field.

4 June 2023
Scorecard

Durham; 168/6 (20 overs)	v	Leicestershire Foxes; 169/3 (18 overs)
Ollie Robinson 69* (43); Josh Hull 3/35 (4 overs)		Louis Kimber 55* (28); Luke Stephen Robinson 2/28 (3 overs)

Leicestershire Foxes won by 7 wickets
Riverside Ground, Chester-le-Street
Umpires: Graham Lloyd and Neil Mallender

- Leicestershire Foxes won the toss and elected to field.

4 June 2023
Scorecard

Lancashire Lightning; 145 (18.3 overs)	v	Notts Outlaws; 149/5 (18.5 overs)
Liam Livingstone 34 (30); Matt Carter 3/26 (4 overs)		Joe Clarke 42 (24); Jack Blatherwick 2/21 (4 overs)

Notts Outlaws won by 5 wickets
Trent Bridge, Nottingham
Umpires: Peter Hartley and Steve O'Shaughnessy

- Lancashire Lightning won the toss and elected to bat.

4 June 2023
Scorecard

Worcestershire Rapids; 178/6 (20 overs)	v	Northants Steelbacks; 180/4 (19.4 overs)
Ben Cox 46* (29); Freddie Heldreich 3/28 (4 overs)		Saif Zaib 70* (35); Adam Finch 1/22 (4 overs)

Northants Steelbacks won by 6 wickets
New Road, Worcester
Umpires: Rob Bailey and Paul Baldwin

- Northants Steelbacks won the toss and elected to field.

4 June 2023
Scorecard

Derbyshire Falcons; 166/8 (20 overs)	v	Yorkshire Vikings; 170/3 (18.2 overs)
Haider Ali 74 (47); Ben Mike 3/39 (4 overs)		Dawid Malan 81* (57); Tom Wood 1/17 (2 overs)

Yorkshire Vikings won by 7 wickets
Headingley, Leeds
Umpires: Hassan Adnan and James Middlebrook

- Yorkshire Vikings won the toss and elected to field.

6 June 2023 (D/N)
Scorecard

Northants Steelbacks; 161/7 (20 overs)	v	Durham; 162/6 (18.5 overs)
Emilio Gay 53 (45); Nathan Sowter 4/14 (4 overs)		Graham Clark 55 (30); Freddie Heldreich 3/36 (4 overs)

Durham won by 4 wickets
Riverside Ground, Chester-le-Street
Umpires: Hassan Adnan and Peter Hartley

- Durham won the toss and elected to field.

6 June 2023 (D/N)
Scorecard

Yorkshire Vikings; 156/7 (20 overs)	v	Leicestershire Foxes; 126 (19.3 overs)
David Wiese 50* (32); Rehan Ahmed 3/21 (4 overs)		Wiaan Mulder 46 (40); Jordan Thompson 5/21 (3.3 overs)

Yorkshire Vikings won by 30 runs
Grace Road, Leicester
Umpires: Rob White and David Millns
Player of the match: David Wiese (Yorkshire Vikings)

- Yorkshire Vikings won the toss and elected to bat.
- Michael Finan (Leicestershire Foxes) made his T20 debut.

7 June 2023 (D/N)
Scorecard

Birmingham Bears; 203/7 (20 overs)	v	Derbyshire Falcons; 207/4 (19.3 overs)
Sam Hain 79* (36); Mattie McKiernan 3/39 (4 overs)		Leus du Plooy 66* (25); Moeen Ali 1/30 (4 overs)

Derbyshire Falcons won by 6 wickets
Edgbaston, Birmingham
Umpires: Tom Lungley and Neil Mallender

- Birmingham Bears won the toss and elected to bat.

7 June 2023 (D/N)
Scorecard

Worcestershire Rapids; 177/9 (20 overs)	v	Lancashire Lightning; 181/6 (19.3 overs)
Mitchell Santner 57 (33); Daryl Mitchell 3/9 (2 overs)		Jos Buttler 58 (42); Dillon Pennington 2/17 (4 overs)

Lancashire Lightning won by 4 wickets
Stanley Park, Blackpool
Umpires: Graham Lloyd and Neil Pratt

- Lancashire Lightning won the toss and elected to field.

8 June 2023 (D/N)
Scorecard

Notts Outlaws; 187/7 (20 overs)	v	Durham; 161/9 (20 overs)
Colin Munro 49 (28); Nathan Sowter 4/29 (4 overs)		Bas de Leede 58 (41); Samit Patel 3/30 (4 overs)

Notts Outlaws won by 26 runs
Trent Bridge, Nottingham
Umpires: James Middlebrook and Sue Redfern

- Durham won the toss and elected to field.

9 June 2023 (D/N)
Scorecard

Birmingham Bears; 137 (18.5 overs)	v	Northants Steelbacks; 107/9 (20 overs)
Sam Hain 35 (31); Freddie Heldreich 4/27 (4 overs)		Andrew Tye 28* (22); Dan Mousley 3/14 (4 overs)

Birmingham Bears won by 30 runs
Edgbaston, Birmingham
Umpires: Paul Pollard and Neil Pratt

- Birmingham Bears won the toss and elected to bat.

9 June 2023 (D/N)
Scorecard

Derbyshire Falcons; 142/6 (20 overs)	v	Notts Outlaws; 143/7 (18.4 overs)
Haider Ali 42 (37); Jake Ball 2/23 (4 overs)		Alex Hales 35 (30); George Scrimshaw 3/16 (4 overs)

Notts Outlaws won by 3 wickets
County Cricket Ground, Derby
Umpires: Neil Mallender and Rob White
Player of the match: Samit Patel (Notts Outlaws)

- Notts Outlaws won the toss and elected to field.

9 June 2023 (D/N)
Scorecard

Durham; 172/4 (20 overs)	v	Leicestershire Foxes; 174/4 (17.4 overs)
Ashton Turner 60* (38); Callum Parkinson 2/21 (4 overs)		Rishi Patel 104 (49); Wayne Parnell 2/36 (4 overs)

Leicestershire Foxes won by 6 wickets
Grace Road, Leicester
Umpires: Ben Debenham and Jack Shantry

- Leicestershire Foxes won the toss and elected to field.

9 June 2023 (D/N)
Scorecard

Yorkshire Vikings; 224/4 (20 overs)	v	Worcestershire Rapids; 198/6 (20 overs)
James Wharton 111* (56); Michael Bracewell 2/39 (4 overs)		Kashif Ali 48* (27); Jordan Thompson 4/34 (4 overs)

Yorkshire Vikings won by 26 runs
Headingley, Leeds
Umpires: Hassan Adnan and Steve O'Shaughnessy

- Yorkshire Vikings won the toss and elected to bat.

16 June 2023 (D/N)
Scorecard

Durham; 178 (20 overs)	v	Derbyshire Falcons; 178/5 (20 overs)
Brydon Carse 58 (30); Zaman Khan 4/21 (4 overs)		Luis Reece 58 (47); Wayne Parnell 3/36 (4 overs)

Match tied
Riverside Ground, Chester-le-Street
Umpires: Richard Kettleborough and Neil Pratt

- Derbyshire Falcons won the toss and elected to field.

16 June 2023 (D/N)
Scorecard

Lancashire Lightning; 204/7 (20 overs)	v	Northants Steelbacks; 169/9 (20 overs)
Steven Croft 101 (52); Ben Sanderson 2/29 (4 overs)		Tom Taylor 40* (27); Luke Wood 3/39 (4 overs)

Lancashire Lightning won by 35 runs
County Cricket Ground, Northampton
Umpires: Hassan Adnan and Rob Bailey

- Northants Steelbacks won the toss and elected to field.

16 June 2023
Scorecard

Birmingham Bears; 196/5 (20 overs)	v	Worcestershire Rapids; 175/6 (20 overs)
Dan Mousley 49* (28); Usama Mir 3/22 (4 overs)		Brett D'Oliveira 50 (38); Glenn Maxwell 2/22 (3 overs)

Birmingham Bears won by 21 runs
New Road, Worcester
Umpires: David Millns and Paul Pollard

- Worcestershire Rapids won the toss and elected to field.

16 June 2023 (D/N)
Scorecard

Leicestershire Foxes; 195/5 (20 overs)	v	Yorkshire Vikings; 197/2 (18.1 overs)
Louis Kimber 59* (38); Ben Mike 2/43 (3 overs)		Adam Lyth 90* (50); Michael Finan 2/35 (3.1 overs)

Yorkshire Vikings won by 8 wickets
Headingley, Leeds
Umpires: Peter Hartley and James Middlebrook

- Yorkshire Vikings won the toss and elected to field.

18 June 2023
Scorecard

Derbyshire Falcons; 212/4 (20 overs)	v	Yorkshire Vikings; 68 (11.2 overs)
Leus du Plooy 66* (32); Dom Bess 1/33 (4 overs)		Matt Revis 21 (20); Zak Chappell 3/16 (2 overs)

Derbyshire Falcons won by 144 runs
Queen's Park, Chesterfield
Umpires: Hassan Adnan and Peter Hartley

- Yorkshire Vikings won the toss and elected to field.

18 June 2023
Scorecard

Lancashire Lightning; 195/7 (20 overs)	v	Durham; 150/3 (17 overs)
Daryl Mitchell 60 (39); Wayne Parnell 3/41 (4 overs)		Alex Lees 78 (57); Luke Wells 2/19 (4 overs)

Lancashire Lightning won by 7 runs (DLS method)
Old Trafford, Manchester
Umpires: Graham Lloyd and Steve O'Shaughnessy

- Durham won the toss and elected to field.
- Durham were set a revised target of 158 runs from 17 overs.

18 June 2023
Scorecard

Leicestershire Foxes; 112 (18.2 overs)	v	Worcestershire Rapids; 113/4 (16.2 overs)
Peter Handscomb 36 (20); Usama Mir 4/22 (4 overs)		Brett D'Oliveira 51* (39); Rehan Ahmed 2/25 (4 overs)

Worcestershire Rapids won by 6 wickets
Grace Road, Leicester
Umpires: Neil Mallender and David Millns

- Worcestershire Rapids won the toss and elected to field.

18 June 2023
Scorecard

Northants Steelbacks; 177/5 (20 overs)	v	Notts Outlaws; 99 (14.3 overs)
Ricardo Vasconcelos 51 (44); Samit Patel 2/23 (4 overs)		Steven Mullaney 31 (25); Ben Sanderson 3/29 (4 overs)

Northants Steelbacks won by 78 runs
County Cricket Ground, Northampton
Umpires: James Middlebrook and Jack Shantry

- Northants Steelbacks won the toss and elected to bat.

20 June 2023 (D/N)
Scorecard

Durham; 146/5 (20 overs)	v	Birmingham Bears; 149/8 (19.3 overs)
Ollie Robinson 54 (50); Hasan Ali 2/15 (4 overs)		Alex Davies 40 (27); Ben Raine 4/30 (4 overs)

Birmingham Bears won by 2 wickets
Riverside Ground, Chester-le-Street
Umpires: Neil Pratt and Steve O'Shaughnessy

- Birmingham Bears won the toss and elected to field.

20 June 2023 (D/N)
Scorecard

Notts Outlaws; 165/8 (20 overs)	v	Leicestershire Foxes; 143/8 (20 overs)
Joe Clarke 72 (41); Tom Scriven 4/21 (4 overs)		Wiaan Mulder 38 (26); Steven Mullaney 3/18 (4 overs)

Notts Outlaws won by 22 runs
Grace Road, Leicester
Umpires: Rob Bailey and Peter Hartley

- Notts Outlaws won the toss and elected to bat.

20 June 2023 (D/N)
Scorecard

Lancashire Lightning; 164/8 (20 overs)	v	Worcestershire Rapids; 165/3 (17.4 overs)
Jos Buttler 74 (54); Pat Brown 3/32 (3 overs)		Jack Haynes 63 (43); Jack Blatherwick 2/41 (3.4 overs)

Worcestershire Rapids won by 7 wickets
New Road, Worcester
Umpires: James Middlebrook and Chris Watts

- Lancashire Lightning won the toss and elected to bat.

20 June 2023
Scorecard

Northants Steelbacks; 180/6 (20 overs)	v	Yorkshire Vikings; 102 (15.2 overs)
Justin Broad 47* (32); Jordan Thompson 2/42 (4 overs)		Dawid Malan 34 (24); Tom Taylor 5/28 (4 overs)

Northants Steelbacks won by 78 runs
Headingley, Leeds
Umpires: Richard Kettleborough and Graham Lloyd

- Northants Steelbacks won the toss and elected to bat.

21 June 2023 (D/N)
Scorecard

Northants Steelbacks; 156/8 (20 overs)	v	Derbyshire Falcons; 160/4 (19.1 overs)
Emilio Gay 47 (34); Zaman Khan 3/26 (4 overs)		Harry Came 43 (40); David Willey 2/33 (4 overs)

Derbyshire Falcons won by 6 wickets
County Cricket Ground, Northampton
Umpires: David Millns and Surendiran Shanmugam

- Northants Steelbacks won the toss and elected to bat.

22 June 2023 (D/N)
Scorecard

Notts Outlaws; 139/8 (20 overs)	v	Worcestershire Rapids; 140/5 (18.3 overs)
Matt Montgomery 39 (39); Brett D'Oliveira 2/15 (3 overs)		Ed Pollock 38* (25); Calvin Harrison 2/16 (3 overs)

Worcestershire Rapids won by 5 wickets
New Road, Worcester
Umpires: Hassan Adnan and Paul Baldwin

- Worcestershire Rapids won the toss and elected to field.
- Haseeb Hameed (Notts Outlaws) made his T20 debut.

22 June 2023 (D/N)
Scorecard

Birmingham Bears; 180/7 (20 overs)	v	Yorkshire Vikings; 176/8 (20 overs)
Rob Yates 66 (51); Matt Revis 2/36 (3 overs)		Jordan Thompson 34 (20); Dan Mousley 4/28 (4 overs)

Birmingham Bears won by 4 runs
Headingley, Leeds
Umpires: Neil Mallender and Paul Pollard

- Birmingham Bears won the toss and elected to bat.

23 June 2023 (D/N)
Scorecard

Birmingham Bears; 228/4 (20 overs)	v	Worcestershire Rapids; 175/9 (20 overs)
Rob Yates 59 (39); Mitchell Santner 2/25 (4 overs)		Mitchell Santner 56 (32); Dan Mousley 4/41 (4 overs)

Birmingham Bears won by 53 runs
Edgbaston, Birmingham
Umpires: Tom Lungley and Chris Watts

- Worcestershire Rapids won the toss and elected to field.

23 June 2023 (D/N)
Scorecard

Yorkshire Vikings; 49/1 (8.1 overs)	v	Durham
Shan Masood 35* (27); Ben Raine 1/15 (2 overs)

No result
Riverside Ground, Chester-le-Street
Umpires: Neil Pratt and Steve O'Shaughnessy

- Durham won the toss and elected to field.
- Play was abandoned due to rain.

23 June 2023 (D/N)
Scorecard

Lancashire Lightning; 177/4 (15 overs)	v	Derbyshire Falcons; 150/7 (15 overs)
Jos Buttler 83 (39); Zak Chappell 2/39 (3 overs)		Harry Came 45 (32); Daryl Mitchell 2/13 (2 overs)

Lancashire Lightning won by 27 runs
Old Trafford, Manchester
Umpires: Graham Lloyd and David Millns

- Derbyshire Falcons won the toss and elected to field.
- The match was reduced to 15 overs due to rain.

23 June 2023 (D/N)
Scorecard

Northants Steelbacks; 210/7 (20 overs)	v	Leicestershire Foxes; 118 (16.4 overs)
Chris Lynn 62 (35); Michael Finan 2/30 (4 overs)		Rehan Ahmed 49 (32); Ben Sanderson 3/20 (4 overs)

Northants Steelbacks won by 92 runs
Grace Road, Leicester
Umpires: Hassan Adnan and Rob White

- Leicestershire Foxes won the toss and elected to field.

30 June 2023 (D/N)
Scorecard

Derbyshire Falcons; 231/4 (20 overs)	v	Leicestershire Foxes; 160 (18.1 overs)
Tom Wood 110* (57); Tom Scriven 2/53 (4 overs)		Peter Handscomb 61 (43); Zaman Khan 3/27 (3 overs)

Derbyshire Falcons won by 71 runs
County Cricket Ground, Derby
Umpires: Tom Lungley and Neil Pratt

- Leicestershire Foxes won the toss and elected to field.

30 June 2023 (D/N)
Scorecard

Lancashire Lightning	v	Yorkshire Vikings

No result
Old Trafford, Manchester
Umpires: Michael Gough and Graham Lloyd

- No toss.
- No play was possible due to rain.

30 June 2023 (D/N)
Scorecard

Notts Outlaws; 168 (20 overs)	v	Birmingham Bears; 172/8 (19.1 overs)
Tom Moores 73 (42); Hasan Ali 3/25 (4 overs)		Rob Yates 65 (46); Shaheen Afridi 4/29 (4 overs)

Birmingham Bears won by 2 wickets
Trent Bridge, Nottingham
Umpires: James Middlebrook and Surendiran Shanmugam

- Birmingham Bears won the toss and elected to field.

30 June 2023
Scorecard

Durham; 216/4 (20 overs)	v	Worcestershire Rapids; 112/3 (11 overs)
Graham Clark 78 (47); Mitchell Santner 1/25 (4 overs)		Mitchell Santner 42 (20); Ben Raine 1/17 (2 overs)

Match tied (DLS method)
New Road, Worcester
Umpires: Paul Baldwin and Jack Shantry

- Worcestershire Rapids won the toss and elected to field.
- Worcestershire Rapids were set a revised target of 113 runs from 11 overs due to rain.

2 July 2023
Scorecard

Birmingham Bears; 141 (19.5 overs)	v	Durham; 133/9 (20 overs)
Rob Yates 53 (42); Ashton Turner 3/20 (4 overs)		Jonathan Bushnell 40* (34); Henry Brookes 3/15 (3.5 overs)

Birmingham Bears won by 8 runs
Edgbaston, Birmingham
Umpires: Neil Pratt and Paul Pollard

- Birmingham Bears won the toss and elected to bat.

2 July 2023
Scorecard

Worcestershire Rapids; 222/5 (20 overs)	v	Derbyshire Falcons; 194 (19.4 overs)
Mitchell Santner 64 (46); Zaman Khan 2/29 (4 overs)		Wayne Madsen 63 (32); Pat Brown 3/35 (3.4 overs)

Worcestershire Rapids won by 28 runs
County Cricket Ground, Derby
Umpires: Michael Gough and Tom Lungley

- Worcestershire Rapids won the toss and elected to bat.

2 July 2023
Scorecard

Northants Steelbacks; 138/7 (20 overs)	v	Lancashire Lightning; 139/4 (16.4 overs)
Chris Lynn 35 (25); Luke Wood 3/17 (4 overs)		Phil Salt 74* (51); Tom Taylor 2/32 (3.4 overs)

Lancashire Lightning won by 6 wickets
Old Trafford, Manchester
Umpires: Graham Lloyd and Peter Hartley

- Lancashire Lightning won the toss and elected to field.

2 July 2023
Scorecard

Notts Outlaws; 168/8 (20 overs)	v	Leicestershire Foxes; 164/8 (20 overs)
Tom Moores 68 (40); Michael Finan 3/39 (4 overs)		Wiaan Mulder 83* (50); Imad Wasim 2/24 (4 overs)

Nottinghamshire Outlaws won by 4 runs
Trent Bridge, Nottingham
Umpires: Ben Peverall and Richard Kettleborough

- Nottinghamshire Outlaws won the toss and elected to bat.

== South Group ==
Pos	Team	Pld	W	L	T	NR	Pts	NRR
1	Somerset	14	12	2	0	0	24	1.460
2	Hampshire Hawks	14	9	5	0	0	18	0.820
3	Surrey	14	8	6	0	0	16	1.192
4	Essex Eagles	14	8	6	0	0	16	0.088
5	Kent Spitfires	14	7	7	0	0	14	0.287
6	Sussex Sharks	14	6	8	0	0	12	−0.871
7	Gloucestershire	14	5	9	0	0	10	−0.993
8	Glamorgan	14	5	9	0	0	10	−1.060
9	Middlesex	14	3	11	0	0	6	−0.932

Source: Cricinfo

Advanced to the Quarter-finals

24 May 2023 (D/N)
Scorecard

Gloucestershire; 113 (16.3 overs)	v	Kent Spitfires; 116/3 (13.3 overs)
Chris Dent 55 (29); Michael Hogan 3/13 (3 overs)		Jordan Cox 38* (17); Tom Smith 3/22 (4 overs)

Kent Spitfires won by 7 wickets
St Lawrence Ground, Canterbury
Umpires: Ben Debenham and Martin Saggers

- Gloucestershire won the toss and elected to bat.

24 May 2023 (N)
Scorecard

Hampshire Hawks; 74 (16.1 overs)	v	Somerset; 75/2 (9.3 overs)
Ross Whiteley 18 (23); Craig Overton 3/8 (4 overs)		Tom Banton 40 (24); Nathan Ellis 1/15 (3 overs)

Somerset won by 8 wickets
County Ground, Taunton
Umpires: Mike Burns and Alex Wharf
Player of the match: Craig Overton (Somerset)

- Somerset won the toss and elected to field.

25 May 2023 (D/N)
Scorecard

Surrey; 199/6 (20 overs)	v	Middlesex; 126 (14.5 overs)
Sam Curran 68 (47); Tom Helm 3/38 (4 overs)		Max Holden 43 (23); Will Jacks 3/17 (3 overs)

Surrey won by 73 runs
Lord's, London
Umpires: Nigel Llong and Tom Lungley
Player of the match: Will Jacks (Surrey)

- Surrey won the toss and elected to bat.
- Nathan Fernandes (Middlesex) made his T20 debut.

26 May 2023 (D/N)
Scorecard

Gloucestershire; 161/9 (20 overs)	v	Glamorgan; 162/8 (19.1 overs)
Ben Charlesworth 56 (39); Dan Douthwaite 4/23 (4 overs)		Colin Ingram 47 (33); David Payne 3/17 (4 overs)

Glamorgan won by 2 wickets
County Ground, Bristol
Umpires: Paul Baldwin and Paul Pollard

- Glamorgan won the toss and elected to field.

26 May 2023 (N)

Middlesex; 171 (19.5 overs)	v	Hampshire Hawks; 172/2 (17.5 overs)
Pieter Malan 80 (45); Nathan Ellis 2/24 (4 overs)		James Vince 88* (55); Nathan Fernandes 1/15 (2 overs)

Hampshire Hawks won by 8 wickets
Rose Bowl, Southampton
Umpires: Mark Newell and Billy Taylor

- Hampshire Hawks won the toss and elected to field.

26 May 2023 (D/N)
Scorecard

Surrey; 223/5 (20 overs)	v	Kent Spitfires; 182/7 (20 overs)
Sean Abbott 110* (41); Grant Stewart 1/29 (4 overs)		Tawanda Muyeye 59 (37); Will Jacks 2/7 (1 over)

Surrey won by 41 runs
The Oval, London
Umpires: Rob Bailey and Martin Saggers
Player of the match: Sean Abbott (Surrey)

- Kent Spitfires won the toss and elected to field.

26 May 2023 (N)
Scorecard

Sussex Sharks; 183/8 (20 overs)	v	Somerset; 184/5 (19.3 overs)
Ravi Bopara 88* (49); Matt Henry 3/50 (4 overs)		Tom Kohler-Cadmore 72 (42); Tymal Mills 3/28 (4 overs)

Somerset won by 5 wickets
County Ground, Hove
Umpires: Neil Bainton and Ian Blackwell

- Somerset won the toss and elected to field.

28 May 2023 (D/N)
Scorecard

Glamorgan; 153 (19.4 overs)	v	Somerset; 154/6 (14.5 overs)
Eddie Byrom 42 (28); Roelof van der Merwe 3/24 (4 overs)		Tom Banton 54 (28); Dan Douthwaite 3/26 (3 overs)

Somerset won by 4 wickets
County Ground, Taunton
Umpires: Mark Newell and Billy Taylor

- Somerset won the toss and elected to field.

28 May 2023
Scorecard

Surrey; 148 (19.3 overs)	v	Sussex Sharks; 149/5 (19.5 overs)
Sunil Narine 29 (18); Ravi Bopara 3/18 (3 overs)		Tom Alsop 51* (42); Sunil Narine 2/18 (4 overs)

Sussex Sharks won by 5 wickets
The Oval, London
Umpires: Paul Baldwin and Ben Debenham

- Sussex Sharks won the toss and elected to field.

29 May 2023
Scorecard

Gloucestershire; 181/9 (20 overs)	v	Middlesex; 179/6 (20 overs)
Miles Hammond 59 (42); Blake Cullen 3/38 (4 overs)		Stephen Eskinazi 54 (38); Ollie Price 3/21 (2 overs)

Gloucestershire won by 2 runs
Merchant Taylors' School, Northwood
Umpires: Rob Bailey and Nigel Llong

- Middlesex won the toss and elected to field.

30 May 2023 (D/N)
Scorecard

Gloucestershire; 195/7 (20 overs)	v	Essex Eagles; 196/7 (19.1 overs)
Ben Charlesworth 52 (20); Paul Walter 2/33 (4 overs)		Robin Das 69 (33); Ollie Price 2/27 (3.1 overs)

Essex Eagles won by 3 wickets
County Ground, Chelmsford
Umpires: Mark Newell and Chris Watts
Player of the match: Robin Das (Essex Eagles)

- Essex Eagles won the toss and elected to field.

30 May 2023 (D/N)
Scorecard

Somerset; 154 (20 overs)	v	Kent Spitfires; 112 (15 overs)
Tom Lammonby 34 (31); Wes Agar 3/18 (4 overs)		Sam Billings 29 (27); Ben Green 3/19 (2 overs)

Somerset won by 13 runs (DLS method)
St Lawrence Ground, Canterbury
Umpires: Neil Bainton and Paul Baldwin

- Kent Spitfires won the toss and elected to field.
- Kent Spitfires were set a revised target of 126 runs from 15 overs due to rain.

31 May 2023 (N)
Scorecard

Hampshire Hawks; 156/4 (20 overs)	v	Surrey; 157/4 (18.5 overs)
James Vince 88* (56); Sean Abbott 1/13 (3 overs)		Will Jacks 83* (57); Liam Dawson 2/18 (4 overs)

Surrey won by 6 wickets
Rose Bowl, Southampton
Umpires: Mike Burns and Nigel Llong

- Surrey won the toss and elected to field.

31 May 2023
Scorecard

Glamorgan; 238/3 (20 overs)	v	Middlesex; 209/5 (20 overs)
Chris Cooke 113* (41); Blake Cullen 2/23 (4 overs)		Joe Cracknell 77 (42); Peter Hatzoglou 2/28 (4 overs)

Glamorgan won by 29 runs
Merchant Taylors' School, Northwood
Umpires: Ben Debenham and Billy Taylor

- Glamorgan won the toss and elected to bat.

1 June 2023 (D/N)
Scorecard

Essex Eagles; 163/7 (20 overs)	v	Sussex Sharks; 138 (18.4 overs)
Feroze Khushi 55 (38); Shadab Khan 3/28 (4 overs)		James Coles 35 (31); Simon Harmer 4/28 (4 overs)

Essex Eagles won by 25 runs
County Ground, Hove
Umpires: Paul Baldwin and Mark Newell

- Sussex Sharks won the toss and elected to field.

2 June 2023 (D/N)
Scorecard

Hampshire Hawks; 214/8 (20 overs)	v	Essex Eagles; 96 (14.1 overs)
James Vince 103 (48); Daniel Sams 3/28 (4 overs)		Adam Rossington 23 (12); Liam Dawson 4/21 (4 overs)

Hampshire Hawks won by 118 runs
County Ground, Chelmsford
Umpires: Rob Bailey and Nigel Llong

- Essex Eagles won the toss and elected to field.

2 June 2023 (D/N)
Scorecard

Kent Spitfires; 189/6 (20 overs)	v	Glamorgan; 191/3 (17 overs)
Tawanda Muyeye 62 (38); Peter Hatzoglou 2/25 (4 overs)		Colin Ingram 63* (32); Grant Stewart 2/51 (3 overs)

Glamorgan won by 7 wickets
Sophia Gardens, Cardiff
Umpires: Jack Shantry and Rob White

- Glamorgan won the toss and elected to field.
- Zain-ul-Hassan (Glamorgan) made his T20 debut.

2 June 2023 (D/N)
Scorecard

Surrey; 124/9 (20 overs)	v	Gloucestershire; 127/8 (19.1 overs)
Jamie Smith 29 (33); David Payne 3/21 (4 overs)		Ollie Price 25 (24); Sam Curran 3/20 (4 overs)

Gloucestershire won by 2 wickets
County Ground, Bristol
Umpires: Ian Blackwell and Alex Wharf
Player of the match: Matt Taylor (Gloucestershire)

- Gloucestershire won the toss and elected to field.

2 June 2023 (D/N)
Scorecard

Middlesex; 136 (18.4 overs)	v	Somerset; 142/1 (13.3 overs)
Jack Davies 32 (20); Ben Green 4/20 (2.4 overs)		Tom Kohler-Cadmore 64* (31); Tom Helm 1/40 (4 overs)

Somerset won by 9 wickets
County Ground, Taunton
Umpires: Mark Newell and Billy Taylor

- Somerset won the toss and elected to field.

3 June 2023 (D/N)
Scorecard

Sussex Sharks; 144 (18.5 overs)	v	Hampshire Hawks; 145/0 (14.5 overs)
Tom Clark 36 (25); Liam Dawson 2/18 (4 overs)		James Vince 71* (39)

Hampshire Hawks won by 10 wickets
Rose Bowl, Southampton
Umpires: Mike Burns and Ben Peverall
Player of the match: Ben McDermott (Hampshire Hawks)

- Sussex Sharks won the toss and elected to bat.
- Danial Ibrahim (Sussex Sharks) made his T20 debut.

4 June 2023
Scorecard

Middlesex; 139/9 (20 overs)	v	Gloucestershire; 140/3 (18.2 overs)
Jack Davies 46* (33); Ollie Price 2/18 (2 overs)		Ollie Price 46 (40); Luke Hollman 1/21 (4 overs)

Gloucestershire won by 7 wickets
County Ground, Bristol
Umpires: Sue Redfern and Alex Wharf

- Gloucestershire won the toss and elected to field.

4 June 2023
Scorecard

Kent Spitfires; 173/5 (20 overs)	v	Surrey; 174/5 (20 overs)
Jack Leaning 34* (22); Will Jacks 3/28 (4 overs)		Laurie Evans 52 (36); George Linde 2/28 (4 overs)

Surrey won by 5 wickets
St Lawrence Ground, Canterbury
Umpires: Neil Bainton and Nigel Llong

- Kent Spitfires won the toss and elected to bat.

4 June 2023
Scorecard

Somerset; 150 (20 overs)	v	Essex Eagles; 139 (19.1 overs)
Sean Dickson 42 (29); Daniel Sams 4/20 (4 overs)		Michael Pepper 63 (43); Matt Henry 3/17 (4 overs)

Somerset won by 11 runs
County Ground, Taunton
Umpires: Ian Blackwell and Billy Taylor

- Essex Eagles won the toss and elected to field.

4 June 2023
Scorecard

Glamorgan; 219/5 (20 overs)	v	Sussex Sharks; 187/8 (20 overs)
Chris Cooke 50 (28); Henry Crocombe 3/38 (4 overs)		Tom Alsop 58 (42); Jamie McIlroy 3/28 (4 overs)

Glamorgan won by 32 runs
County Ground, Hove
Umpires: Ben Debenham and Mark Newell

- Sussex Sharks won the toss and elected to field.

6 June 2023 (N)
Scorecard

Sussex Sharks; 147 (19.3 overs)	v	Essex Eagles; 149/5 (14.5 overs)
Ravi Bopara 50 (31); Sam Cook 4/20 (4 overs)		Michael Pepper 48 (26); Tymal Mills 2/34 (4 overs)

Essex Eagles won by 5 wickets
County Ground, Chelmsford
Umpires: Paul Pollard and Billy Taylor

- Sussex Sharks won the toss and elected to bat.

6 June 2023
Scorecard

Hampshire Hawks; 164/6 (20 overs)	v	Middlesex; 159/7 (20 overs)
Ben McDermott 47 (34); Luke Hollman 2/12 (3 overs)		Max Holden 53 (31); John Turner 3/30 (4 overs)

Hampshire Hawks won by 5 runs
Radlett Cricket Club, Radlett
Umpires: Rob Bailey and Neil Bainton

- Middlesex won the toss and elected to field.
- John Turner (Hampshire Hawks) made his T20 debut.

7 June 2023 (D/N)
Scorecard

Surrey; 236/2 (20 overs)	v	Glamorgan; 171/8 (20 overs)
Laurie Evans 118* (60); Jamie McIlroy 1/33 (4 overs)		Sam Northeast 76 (54); Gus Atkinson 2/24 (4 overs)

Surrey won by 65 runs
Sophia Gardens, Cardiff
Umpires: Paul Baldwin and Ian Blackwell

- Surrey won the toss and elected to bat.

7 June 2023 (N)
Scorecard

Hampshire Hawks; 178/4 (20 overs)	v	Somerset; 173/6 (20 overs)
Joe Weatherley 59* (37); Ben Green 2/29 (4 overs)		Will Smeed 52 (32); John Turner 2/30 (4 overs)

Hampshire Hawks won by 5 runs
Rose Bowl, Southampton
Umpires: Mike Burns and Mark Newell

- Somerset won the toss and elected to field.
- Shoaib Bashir (Somerset) made his T20 debut.

7 June 2023 (D/N)
Scorecard

Kent Spitfires; 150/8 (20 overs)	v	Essex Eagles; 155/6 (18.2 overs)
Joe Denly 39 (39); Sam Cook 4/18 (4 overs)		Matt Critchley 63* (46); Michael Hogan 2/38 (4 overs)

Essex Eagles won by 4 wickets
St Lawrence Ground, Canterbury
Umpires: Ben Debenham and Nigel Llong
Player of the match: Sam Cook (Essex Eagles)

- Kent Spitfires won the toss and elected to bat.

8 June 2023 (D/N)
Scorecard

Sussex Sharks; 181/8 (20 overs)	v	Middlesex; 177/5 (20 overs)
Shadab Khan 59 (30); Luke Hollman 2/30 (4 overs)		Stephen Eskinazi 94* (62); Nathan McAndrew 2/34 (4 overs)

Sussex Sharks won by 4 runs
Lord's, London
Umpires: Rob Bailey and David Millns
Player of the match: Shadab Khan (Sussex Sharks)

- Sussex Sharks won the toss and elected to bat.

9 June 2023 (D/N)
Scorecard

Essex Eagles; 226/9 (20 overs)	v	Glamorgan; 175 (18.3 overs)
Paul Walter 78 (34); Ruaidhri Smith 3/33 (4 overs)		Colin Ingram 48 (21); Paul Walter 2/19 (2 overs)

Essex Eagles won by 51 runs
Sophia Gardens, Cardiff
Umpires: Graham Lloyd and Tom Lungley

- Essex Eagles won the toss and elected to bat.

9 June 2023 (D/N)
Scorecard

Somerset; 231/4 (20 overs)	v	Gloucestershire; 151 (19 overs)
Will Smeed 94 (35); Zafar Gohar 2/44 (4 overs)		Miles Hammond 61 (34); Roelof van der Merwe 3/25 (4 overs)

Somerset won by 80 runs
County Ground, Bristol
Umpires: Paul Baldwin and Russell Warren

- Gloucestershire won the toss and elected to field.

9 June 2023 (D/N)
Scorecard

Hampshire Hawks; 177/7 (20 overs)	v	Kent Spitfires; 180/4 (19.3 overs)
Joe Weatherley 67 (50); Fred Klaassen 2/31 (4 overs)		Daniel Bell-Drummond 89 (55); Nathan Ellis 2/29 (4 overs)

Kent Spitfires won by 6 wickets
St Lawrence Ground, Canterbury
Umpires: Nigel Llong and Billy Taylor

- Kent Spitfires won the toss and elected to field.

9 June 2023 (N)
Scorecard

Surrey; 258/6 (20 overs)	v	Sussex Sharks; 134 (14.5 overs)
Laurie Evans 93 (51); Tymal Mills 2/50 (4 overs)		Tom Clark 43 (23); Sunil Narine 3/12 (2.5 overs)

Surrey won by 124 runs
County Ground, Hove
Umpires: Mike Burns and Mark Newell

- Sussex Sharks won the toss and elected to field.

16 June 2023 (N)
Scorecard

Glamorgan; 175/6 (20 overs)	v	Essex Eagles; 177/6 (16 overs)
Kiran Carlson 43 (25); Simon Harmer 2/43 (4 overs)		Feroze Khushi 61 (37); Jamie McIlroy 4/36 (3 overs)

Essex Eagles won by 4 wickets
County Ground, Chelmsford
Umpires: Ben Debenham and Chris Watts

- Essex Eagles won the toss and elected to field.

16 June 2023 (D/N)
Scorecard

Kent Spitfires; 228/3 (20 overs)	v	Middlesex; 215/7 (20 overs)
Joe Denly 73* (37); Blake Cullen 2/36 (3.2 overs)		Max Holden 121* (59); Fred Klaassen 2/34 (4 overs)

Kent Spitfires won by 13 runs
Lord's, London
Umpires: Neil Bainton and Rob White

- Kent Spitfires won the toss and elected to bat.

16 June 2023 (D/N)
Scorecard

Surrey; 195/9 (20 overs)	v	Somerset; 167/9 (20 overs)
Will Jacks 60 (43); Ben Green 4/33 (4 overs)		Tom Banton 53 (37); Sam Curran 5/26 (4 overs)

Surrey won by 28 runs
County Ground, Taunton
Umpires: Mark Newell and Jack Shantry

- Somerset won the toss and elected to field.

16 June 2023 (N)
Scorecard

Sussex Sharks; 183/6 (20 overs)	v	Hampshire Hawks; 177/9 (20 overs)
Oli Carter 64 (33); John Turner 2/30 (3 overs)		Liam Dawson 59 (34); Brad Currie 3/27 (4 overs)

Sussex Sharks won by 6 runs
County Ground, Hove
Umpires: Nigel Llong and Billy Taylor
Player of the match: Brad Currie (Sussex Sharks)

- Hampshire Hawks won the toss and elected to field.
- Brad Currie (Sussex Sharks) made his T20 debut.

17 June 2023 (N)
Scorecard

Gloucestershire; 137 (19.3 overs)	v	Kent Spitfires; 138/3 (17 overs)
Miles Hammond 30 (20); Jack Leaning 2/16 (4 overs)		Daniel Bell-Drummond 56* (49); Tom Price 1/29 (3 overs)

Kent Spitfires won by 7 wickets
County Ground, Bristol
Umpires: Tom Lungley and Russell Warren
Player of the match: Jordan Cox (Kent Spitfires)

- Kent Spitfires won the toss and elected to field.

18 June 2023
Scorecard

Glamorgan; 183/5 (20 overs)	v	Gloucestershire; 151/8 (20 overs)
Sam Northeast 60* (48); Tom Smith 2/20 (4 overs)		Ben Charlesworth 45 (28); Peter Hatzoglou 3/23 (4 overs)

Glamorgan won by 32 runs
Sophia Gardens, Cardiff
Umpires: Ian Blackwell and Richard Illingworth

- Gloucestershire won the toss and elected to field.
- Zaman Akhter (Gloucestershire) made his T20 debut.

18 June 2023
Scorecard

Essex Eagles; 237/6 (20 overs)	v	Middlesex; 116/2 (12.3 overs)
Daniel Sams 67 (24); Martin Andersson 3/38 (4 overs)		Joe Cracknell 36* (33); Dan Lawrence 1/11 (1 over)

Essex Eagles won by 22 runs (DLS method)
Lord's, London
Umpires: Paul Pollard and Chris Watts

- Middlesex won the toss and elected to field.
- Middlesex innings curtailed at 12.3 overs due to rain; DLS par score was 139.

18 June 2023
Scorecard

Surrey; 124 (19.2 overs)	v	Hampshire Hawks; 125/1 (14.2 overs)
Jamie Overton 45 (24); John Turner 3/17 (4 overs)		James Vince 62* (40); Gus Atkinson 1/29 (3 overs)

Hampshire Hawks won by 9 wickets
The Oval, London
Umpires: Neil Bainton and Rob White

- Hampshire Hawks won the toss and elected to field.

19 June 2023 (D/N)
Scorecard

Essex Eagles; 186 (19.2 overs)	v	Somerset; 187/3 (16.3 overs)
Robin Das 72 (39); Matt Henry 3/24 (4 overs)		Tom Banton 42 (30); Daniel Sams 2/22 (4 overs)

Somerset won by 7 wickets
County Ground, Chelmsford
Umpires: Ben Debenham and Surendiran Shanmugam

- Somerset won the toss and elected to field.

20 June 2023 (D/N)
Scorecard

Hampshire Hawks; 158/7 (20 overs)	v	Gloucestershire; 85/2 (8.1 overs)
Ross Whiteley 41* (25); Tom Smith 3/26 (4 overs)		Ben Wells 43* (22); John Turner 1/17 (2 overs)

Gloucestershire won by 8 wickets (DLS method)
County Ground, Bristol
Umpires: Paul Baldwin and Tom Lungley

- Gloucestershire won the toss and elected to field.
- Gloucestershire were set a revised target of 84 runs from 9 overs due to rain.

20 June 2023 (D/N)
Scorecard

Surrey; 238/5 (20 overs)	v	Glamorgan; 157/8 (20 overs)
Will Jacks 69 (40); Peter Hatzoglou 3/45 (4 overs)		Chris Cooke 49 (28); Chris Jordan 4/21 (4 overs)

Surrey won by 81 runs
The Oval, London
Umpires: Nigel Llong and Paul Pollard

- Glamorgan won the toss and elected to field.
- Josh Blake (Surrey) and Andy Gorvin (Glamorgan) both made their T20 debuts.

20 June 2023 (D/N)
Scorecard

Sussex Sharks; 169/7 (20 overs)	v	Kent Spitfires; 172/4 (18.4 overs)
Ravi Bopara 53 (39); Michael Hogan 4/31 (4 overs)		Jordan Cox 82* (44); Aristides Karvelas 2/36 (3.4 overs)

Kent Spitfires won by 6 wickets
County Ground, Hove
Umpires: Ian Blackwell and Mark Newell

- Sussex Sharks won the toss and elected to bat.

21 June 2023 (D/N)
Scorecard

Glamorgan; 171 (19.3 overs)	v	Somerset; 172/2 (17.1 overs)
Kiran Carlson 71 (45); Craig Overton 3/21 (4 overs)		Will Smeed 66 (36); Ruaidhri Smith 2/47 (4 overs)

Somerset won by 8 wickets
Sophia Gardens, Cardiff
Umpires: Jack Shantry and Russell Warren

- Somerset won the toss and elected to field.

22 June 2023 (D/N)
Scorecard

Essex Eagles; 184 (19.5 overs)	v	Kent Spitfires; 190/3 (18.2 overs)
Dan Lawrence 52 (36); Michael Hogan 2/29 (2.5 overs)		Joe Denly 76 (32); Shane Snater 2/28 (3 overs)

Kent Spitfires won by 7 wickets
County Ground, Chelmsford
Umpires: Rob Bailey and Ben Debenham

- Kent Spitfires won the toss and elected to field.

22 June 2023 (D/N)
Scorecard

Gloucestershire; 140 (19.2 overs)	v	Sussex Sharks; 141/3 (13.2 overs)
Grant Roelofsen 41 (27); Aristides Karvelas 4/20 (3.2 overs)		Harrison Ward 51 (27); Tom Smith 2/20 (3 overs)

Sussex Sharks won by 7 wickets
County Ground, Bristol
Umpires: Mike Burns and Richard Illingworth

- Sussex Sharks won the toss and elected to field.

22 June 2023 (D/N)
Scorecard

Surrey; 252/7 (20 overs)	v	Middlesex; 254/3 (19.2 overs)
Will Jacks 96 (45); Ryan Higgins 2/40 (4 overs)		Stephen Eskinazi 73 (39); Chris Jordan 2/41 (4 overs)

Middlesex won by 7 wickets
The Oval, London
Umpires: Nigel Llong and Rob White

- Middlesex won the toss and elected to field.
- This was the highest runchase in the history of T20 Blast.

23 June 2023 (D/N)
Scorecard

Sussex Sharks; 182/6 (20 overs)	v	Glamorgan; 162/8 (20 overs)
Shadab Khan 87* (53); Timm van der Gugten 3/20 (3 overs)		Cam Fletcher 57 (40); Brad Currie 2/21 (3 overs)

Sussex Sharks won by 20 runs
Sophia Gardens, Cardiff
Umpires: Mike Burns and James Middlebrook

- Sussex Sharks won the toss and elected to bat.

23 June 2023 (D/N)
Scorecard

Essex Eagles; 209/7 (20 overs)	v	Hampshire Hawks; 212/6 (19.2 overs)
Dan Lawrence 70 (33); John Turner 3/19 (4 overs)		James Vince 76 (42); Matt Critchley 2/26 (3 overs)

Hampshire Hawks won by 4 wickets
Rose Bowl, Southampton
Umpires: Mark Newell and Surendiran Shanmugam

- Hampshire Hawks won the toss and elected to field.

23 June 2023 (D/N)
Scorecard

Kent Spitfires; 228/3 (20 overs)	v	Middlesex; 173 (19 overs)
Daniel Bell-Drummond 111 (58); Josh de Caires 1/27 (3 overs)		Luke Hollman 48 (20); George Linde 3/21 (3 overs)

Kent Spitfires won by 55 runs
St Lawrence Ground, Canterbury
Umpires: Ben Debenham and Nigel Llong

- Middlesex won the toss and elected to field.

23 June 2023 (N)
Scorecard

Gloucestershire; 186/8 (20 overs)	v	Somerset; 187/6 (19.3 overs)
Grant Roelofsen 52 (39); Matt Henry 2/28 (4 overs)		Will Smeed 78 (42); Zaman Akhter 2/36 (4 overs)

Somerset won by 4 wickets
County Ground, Taunton
Umpires: Ian Blackwell and Russell Warren
Player of the match: Will Smeed (Somerset)

- Somerset won the toss and elected to field.

30 June 2023 (D/N)
Scorecard

Essex Eagles; 225/6 (20 overs)	v	Middlesex; 226/8 (19.4 overs)
Daniel Sams 69* (34); Luke Hollman 1/14 (1 over)		Ryan Higgins 61 (24); Matt Critchley 5/28 (4 overs)

Middlesex won by 2 wickets
County Ground, Chelmsford
Umpires: Hassan Adnan and Chris Watts

- Middlesex won the toss and elected to field.

30 June 2023 (D/N)
Scorecard

Hampshire Hawks; 97/2 (9.2 overs)	v	Glamorgan; 54/1 (5.3 overs)
Ben McDermott 54* (27); Peter Hatzoglou 1/6 (1.2 overs)		Colin Ingram 34* (14); Nathan Ellis 1/17 (2 overs)

Hampshire Hawks won by 21 runs (DLS method)
Rose Bowl, Southampton
Umpires: Mike Burns and Mark Newell

- Glamorgan won the toss and elected to field.
- Glamorgan were set a revised target of 76 runs from 5.3 overs due to rain.

30 June 2023 (D/N)
Scorecard

Sussex Sharks; 228/7 (20 overs)	v	Kent Spitfires; 117/4 (10 overs)
Ravi Bopara 108 (53); Matt Quinn 2/43 (4 overs)		Jordan Cox 37* (16); Aristides Karvelas 1/22 (2 overs)

Sussex Sharks won by 11 runs (DLS method)
St Lawrence Ground, Canterbury
Umpires: Neil Bainton and Nigel Llong

- Kent Spitfires won the toss and elected to field.
- Kent Spitfires were set a revised target of 129 runs from 10 overs due to rain.

30 June 2023 (D/N)
Scorecard

Somerset; 208/5 (20 overs)	v	Surrey; 190/9 (20 overs)
Tom Banton 84 (44); Sunil Narine 2/38 (4 overs)		Will Jacks 50 (26); Matt Henry 4/30 (4 overs)

Somerset won by 18 runs
The Oval, London
Umpires: Ben Debenham and Rob White

- Surrey won the toss and elected to field.

1 July 2023
Scorecard

Sussex Sharks; 160/9 (20 overs)	v	Gloucestershire; 165/5 (16.5 overs)
Michael Burgess 64* (37); Graeme van Buuren 2/13 (4 overs)		Ben Charlesworth 34 (31); Nathan McAndrew 2/31 (2.5 overs)

Gloucestershire won by 5 wickets
County Ground, Hove
Umpires: Anthony Harris and Rob White

- Sussex Sharks won the toss and elected to bat.

2 July 2023
Scorecard

Middlesex; 200/9 (20 overs)	v	Glamorgan; 151 (15.3 overs)
Ryan Higgins 71* (36); Prem Sisodiya 3/32 (4 overs)		Kiran Carlson 77 (30); Ryan Higgins 3/20 (3 overs)

Middlesex won by 49 runs
Sophia Gardens, Cardiff
Umpires: Mike Burns and Naeem Ashraf

- Middlesex won the toss and elected to bat first.

2 July 2023
Scorecard

Gloucestershire; 105 (19.3 overs)	v	Hampshire Hawks; 107/2 (14.3 overs)
Grant Roelofsen 26 (19); John Turner 3/15 (4 overs)		James Vince 55* (43); Zaman Akhter 1/25 (4 overs)

Hampshire Hawks won by 8 wickets
Rose Bowl, Southampton
Umpires: Jack Shantry and Mark Newell

- Hampshire Hawks won the toss and elected to field.

2 July 2023
Scorecard

Somerset; 221/7 (20 overs)	v	Kent Spitfires; 206/7 (20 overs)
Will Smeed 61 (28); Grant Stewart 4/48 (4 overs)		Joey Evison 46 (24); Matt Henry 2/40 (4 overs)

Somerset won by 15 runs
County Ground, Taunton
Umpires: Ben Debenham Ian Blackwell
Player of the match: Lewis Gregory (Somerset)

- Kent Spitfires won the toss and elected to field.

2 July 2023
Scorecard

Surrey; 195/6 (20 overs)	v	Essex Eagles; 199/7 (20 overs)
Sunil Narine 78* (38); Shane Snater 1/13 (2 overs)		Michael Pepper 75 (39); Chris Jordan 1/23 (4 overs)

Essex Eagles won by 3 wickets
The Oval, London
Umpires: Rob Bailey and Surendiran Shanmugam

- Essex Eagles won the toss and elected to field.

== Knock-out stage ==
Quarter-finals
S1	Somerset	158/5
N4	Notts Outlaws	157/6
N2	Lancashire Lightning	174/6
S3	Surrey	187/5
N1	Birmingham Bears	167/7
S4	Essex Eagles	171/8
S2	Hampshire Hawks	102/5
N3	Worcestershire Rapids	100

Semi-finals
QF 3	Somerset	142/7
QF 2	Surrey	118
QF 1	Essex Eagles	115/5 (DLS)
QF 4	Hampshire Hawks	170/7

Final
SF 2	Somerset	145
SF 1	Essex Eagles	131

=== Quarter-finals ===
Quarter-final 1
6 July 2023
18:30 (D/N)
Scorecard

Birmingham Bears; 167/7 (20 overs)	v	Essex Eagles; 171/8 (19.5 overs)
Sam Hain 52 (36); Sam Cook 2/24 (4 overs)		Dan Lawrence 62 (49); Dominic Drakes 2/26 (4 overs)

Essex Eagles won by 2 wickets
Edgbaston, Birmingham
Umpires: Ian Blackwell and Steve O'Shaughnessy
Player of the match: Dan Lawrence (Essex Eagles)

- Essex Eagles won the toss and elected to field.

Quarter-final 2
7 July 2023
18:30 (D/N)
Scorecard

Surrey; 187/5 (20 overs)	v	Lancashire Lightning; 174/6 (20 overs)
Laurie Evans 70 (41); Tom Bailey 2/37 (4 overs)		Steven Croft 55 (41); Chris Jordan 2/28 (4 overs)

Surrey won by 13 runs
Old Trafford, Manchester
Umpires: Paul Pollard and Rob White

- Surrey won the toss and elected to bat.

Quarter-final 3
7 July 2023
18:30 (D/N)
Scorecard

Notts Outlaws; 157/6 (20 overs)	v	Somerset; 158/5 (19.3 overs)
Matthew Montgomery 51 (38); Craig Overton 2/23 (4 overs)		Lewis Gregory 57* (34); Calvin Harrison 2/26 (4 overs)

Somerset won by 5 wickets
County Ground, Taunton
Umpires: David Millns and Graham Lloyd
Player of the match: Lewis Gregory (Somerset)

- Notts Outlaws won the toss and elected to bat.

Quarter-final 4
7 July 2023
19:00 (D/N)
Scorecard

Worcestershire Rapids; 100 (17.5 overs)	v	Hampshire Hawks; 102/5 (15.3 overs)
Usama Mir 39 (34); Nathan Ellis 4/6 (2.5 overs)		Tom Prest 25 (16); Adam Finch 2/18 (2 overs)

Hampshire Hawks won by 5 wickets
Rose Bowl, Southampton
Umpires: Ben Debenham and Tom Lungley

- Hampshire Hawks won the toss and elected to field.

== Finals Day ==
=== Semi-finals ===
Semi-final 1
15 July 2023
11:00
Scorecard

Hampshire Hawks; 170/7 (20 overs)	v	Essex Eagles; 115/5 (11.3 overs)
Joe Weatherley 63* (39); Matt Critchley 2/22 (4 overs)		Daniel Sams 29 (17); James Fuller 2/23 (2 overs)

Essex Eagles won by 5 wickets (DLS method)
Edgbaston, Birmingham
Umpires: Martin Saggers and Russell Warren
Player of the match: Matt Critchley (Essex Eagles)

- Essex Eagles won the toss and elected to field.
- Essex Eagles were set a revised target of 115 from 12 overs due to rain.

Semi-final 2
15 July 2023
14:30
Scorecard

Somerset; 142/7 (19 overs)	v	Surrey; 118 (16.5 overs)
Sean Dickson 30* (22); Sean Abbott 4/23 (4 overs)		Tom Curran 22 (15); Matt Henry 3/19 (3.5 overs)

Somerset won by 24 runs
Edgbaston, Birmingham
Umpires: Graham Lloyd and Steve O'Shaughnessy
Player of the match: Craig Overton (Somerset)

- Surrey won the toss and elected to field.
- The match was reduced to 19 overs per side due to rain.

=== Final ===
15 July 2023
18:45 (N)
Scorecard

Somerset; 145 (20 overs)	v	Essex Eagles; 131 (18.3 overs)
Sean Dickson 53 (35); Shane Snater 3/13 (4 overs)		Daniel Sams 45 (26); Matt Henry 4/24 (3.3 overs)

Somerset won by 14 runs
Edgbaston, Birmingham
Umpires: Martin Saggers and Russell Warren
Player of the match: Matt Henry (Somerset)

- Essex Eagles won the toss and elected to field.
- The match started at 19:05 rather than its scheduled time due to rain.
