= Stanley McAlindon =

English cricketer (born 2004)

Personal information
- Full name: Stanley James Coulthard McAlindon
- Born: 28 April 2004 (age 22); Carlisle, Cumbria, England
- Batting: Right-handed
- Bowling: Right arm fast medium

Domestic team information
- Years: Team
- 2022–2025: Durham (squad no. 28)
- First-class debut: 11 July 2022 Durham v Derbyshire
- List A debut: 4 August 2022 Durham v Surrey

Career statistics
Competition	FC	LA
Matches	6	8
Runs scored	75	123
Batting average	37.50	30.75
100s/50s	0/0	0/1
Top score	26*	60
Balls bowled	536	324
Wickets	10	7
Bowling average	45.90	48.57
5 wickets in innings	0	0
10 wickets in match	0	0
Best bowling	3/34	4/29
Catches/stumpings	2/–	2/–
- Source: Cricinfo, 27 March 2025

Stanley James Coulthard McAlindon (born 28 April 2004) is an English cricketer from Cumbria who plays for Durham County Cricket Club. He is a right-handed batsman and right-arm fast-medium bowler.

== Early life ==
McAlindon attended Trinity School in Carlisle. He began playing cricket with the Great Corby Cricket Club as a five-year-old. He joined Carlisle Cricket Club and progressed to play for the first team in the Cumbria League Premier Division by the age of fifteen. He also played in the age groups at Carlisle United F.C. but chose to prioritise cricket and signed up to the Durham Academy in 2018.

== Career ==
On 11 July 2022, McAlindon made his debut for Durham in first-class cricket against Derbyshire.

McAlindon scored his first half-century in a one-day cricket match for Durham against Leicestershire on 23 August 2022, scoring 60 from 50 deliveries, in the 2022 Royal London One-Day Cup. In the same match he also record new career-best List-A bowling figures of 4-29.

McAlindon signed a rookie contract with Durham in November 2022.

== International career ==
McAlindon was called up to the England under-19 cricket team in August 2022 for marches against the Sri Lanka U-19s. In December 2022, McAlindon was included in the England U-19 squad for a tour of Australia in the winter of 2022-23.

== Personal life ==
He was coached by his father Mark McAlindon at Corby Cricket Club.
