= Josh Blake =

English cricketer

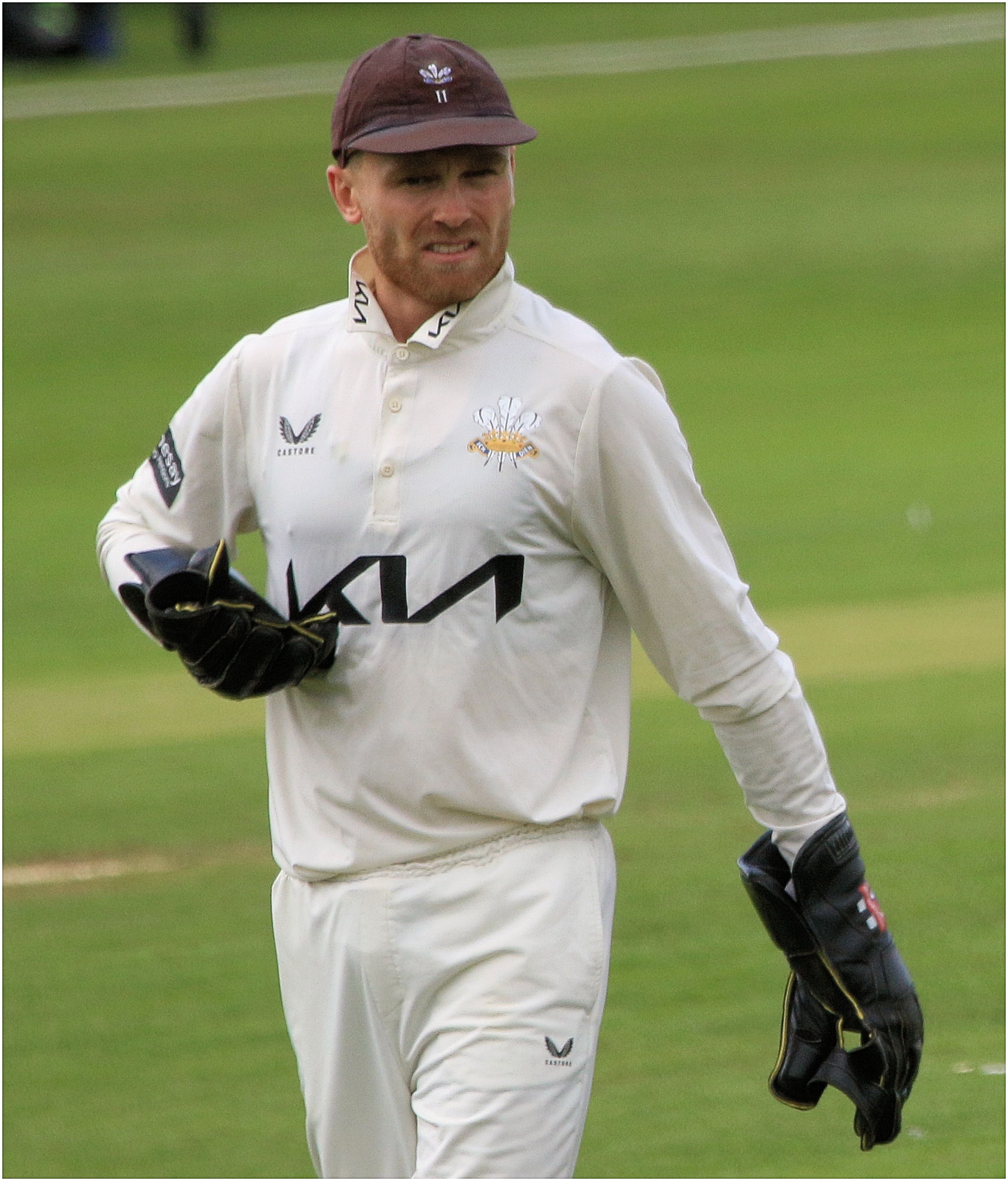
- Blake in 2025

Personal information
- Full name: Joshua William Blake
- Born: 18 September 1998 (age 28); Carshalton, London, England
- Batting: Left-handed
- Bowling: Right-arm leg break
- Role: Wicket-keeper

Domestic team information
- Years: Team
- 2022–2026: Surrey (squad no. 18)
- FC debut: 26 September 2024 Surrey v Essex
- LA debut: 2 August 2022 Surrey v Leicestershire

Career statistics
Competition	FC	LA	T20
Matches	8	36	2
Runs scored	263	1,089	—
Batting average	29.22	35.12	—
100s/50s	0/1	1/5	—/—
Top score	72	100*	—
Catches/stumpings	6/0	34/9	4/0
- Source: ESPNcricinfo, 27 September 2026

Joshua William Blake (born 18 September 1998) is an English cricketer who plays for Surrey County Cricket Club. He is a left handed batsman and wicket-keeper.

== Career ==
Blake signed his first professional contract with Surrey in 2022 until the end of the 2024 season. He has been coaching at the Surrey Cricket Foundation since 2018 and playing Second XI cricket for Surrey since 2021. Blake played age group cricket with Surrey from under-9s through to under-15s. He has also played for Sutton Cricket Club.

Blake made his senior Surrey and List A debut on 2 August 2022 in the One Day Cup match against Leicestershire at Guildford. Blake made his Twenty20 debut on 20 June 2023 in the T20 Blast match against Glamorgan at The Oval.

On 30 August 2023, Blake signed a new contract with Surrey after a number of impressive performances during the 2023 season.

On 1 October 2026, Blake signed for Leicestershire County Cricket Club on a two-year contract.
