= Liam Hurt =

English cricketer (born 1994)

Personal information
- Full name: Liam Jack Hurt
- Born: 15 March 1994 (age 32); Preston, Lancashire, England
- Batting: Right-handed
- Bowling: Right-arm fast-medium
- Role: Bowler

Domestic team information
- Years: Team
- 2015: Leicestershire
- 2018–2022: Lancashire (squad no. 22)
- 2022–present: Staffordshire
- First-class debut: 23 September 2019 Lancashire v Leicestershire
- List A debut: 6 August 2015 Leicestershire v Durham

Career statistics
Competition	FC	LA	T20
Matches	4	20	8
Runs scored	103	75	7
Batting average	20.60	15.00	3.50
100s/50s	0/0	0/0	0/0
Top score	49	15*	7
Balls bowled	558	900	132
Wickets	7	30	7
Bowling average	51.14	27.66	30.85
5 wickets in innings	0	0	0
10 wickets in match	0	0	0
Best bowling	4/27	3/25	3/22
Catches/stumpings	0/–	6/–	4/–
- Source: CricketArchive, 5 October 2022

Liam Jack Hurt (born 15 March 1994) is an English first class cricketer. He made his List A debut for Leicestershire in the 2015 Royal London One-Day Cup on 6 August 2015. He made his Twenty20 debut on 26 August 2019, for Lancashire in the 2019 t20 Blast. Hurt made his first class County Championship Division 2 debut against former club Leicestershire on 23 September 2019. On 17 September 2022, Hurt played in the 2022 Royal London One-Day Cup against Kent County Cricket Club at Trent Bridge. On 21 November 2022, Staffordshire County Cricket Club announced the signing of Hurt following his release from Lancashire at the end of the 2022 season.
