= Jack Campbell (cricketer) =

English cricketer (born 1999)

Personal information
- Full name: Jack Oliver Ian Campbell
- Born: 11 November 1999 (age 27); Portsmouth, Hampshire, England
- Batting: Right-handed
- Bowling: Left-arm medium-fast

Domestic team information
- Years: Team
- 2019: Durham MCCU
- 2019–2021: Durham (squad no. 21)
- 2022–2023: Hampshire (squad no. 11)
- 2024: Sussex (squad no. 32)
- 2025: Wiltshire

Career statistics
Competition	FC	LA	T20
Matches	4	18	2
Runs scored	2	12	6
Batting average	1.00	4.00	6.00
100s/50s	0/0	0/0	0/0
Top score	2	5*	6
Balls bowled	501	833	12
Wickets	1	26	1
Bowling average	261.00	29.57	21.00
5 wickets in innings	0	0	0
10 wickets in match	0	0	0
Best bowling	1/43	4/44	1/21
Catches/stumpings	1/–	1/–	0/–
- Source: Cricinfo, 23 May 2025

Jack Oliver Ian Campbell (born 11 November 1999) is an English former professional cricketer.

Campbell was born at Portsmouth in November 1999. He grew up in Petersfield, where he was educated nearby at Churcher's College. He initially played club cricket in his youth for Steep Cricket Club, before being spotted by Liphook and Ripsley Cricket Club and progressing through the academy at Hampshire. At the age of 18, Campbell moved to Newcastle to live with relatives while studying at Durham University. While studying at Durham, he played for Chester-le-Street in the North East Premier League and earned a call-up to the England under-19 cricket team, making a single appearance for the under-19s against South Africa under-19's at Gosforth in 2018. The following season, he made two appearances in first-class cricket for Durham MCCU, against Durham and Northamptonshire. In that same season, he played for Durham against Leicestershire in the County Championship.

Two years would elapse before Campbell made any further first team appearances for Durham, with him making five appearances in List A one-day cricket in the 2021 Royal London One-Day Cup and two appearances in the 2021 Vitality Blast. Campbell left Durham midway through the 2022 season, citing a need "to explore new opportunities". He returned to Hampshire on loan during the 2022 season, making one first-class appearance against a Sri Lanka Cricket Development XI, in addition to appearing nine times in the Royal London One-Day Cup. In his nine one-day appearances, he took 17 wickets with his left-arm medium-fast bowling at an average of 21.76, with best figures of 4 for 44. He performed well enough in the 2022 Royal London One-Day Cup to be awarded a one-year contract by Hampshire, however he did not appear for Hampshire in 2023 and was released at the end of that season, alongside Harry Petrie.

After impressing in the Second Eleven Championship for Sussex at the start of the 2024 season, Campbell signed a contract with the club until the end of that season. He made four one-day appearances in the One-Day Cup, but was not retained for the 2025 season. He began playing national counties cricket for Wiltshire in 2025.
