= Nick Kimber =

English cricketer (born 2001)

Personal information
- Full name: Nicholas John Henry Kimber
- Born: 16 January 2001 (age 25); Lincoln, Lincolnshire, England
- Batting: Right-handed
- Bowling: Right-arm medium-fast
- Relatives: Louis Kimber (brother)

Domestic team information
- Years: Team
- 2021–2022: Surrey (squad no. 12)
- List A debut: 30 July 2021 Surrey v Northamptonshire

Career statistics
Competition	List A
Matches	10
Runs scored	196
Batting average	28.00
100s/50s	0/1
Top score	84
Balls bowled	216
Wickets	6
Bowling average	44.83
5 wickets in innings	0
10 wickets in match	0
Best bowling	2/15
Catches/stumpings	4/–
- Source: Cricinfo, 29 August 2022

Nicholas John Henry Kimber (born 16 January 2001) is an English cricketer. He made his List A debut on 30 July 2021, for Surrey in the 2021 Royal London One-Day Cup.
