= Robin Das =

English-Bangladeshi cricketer (born 2002)

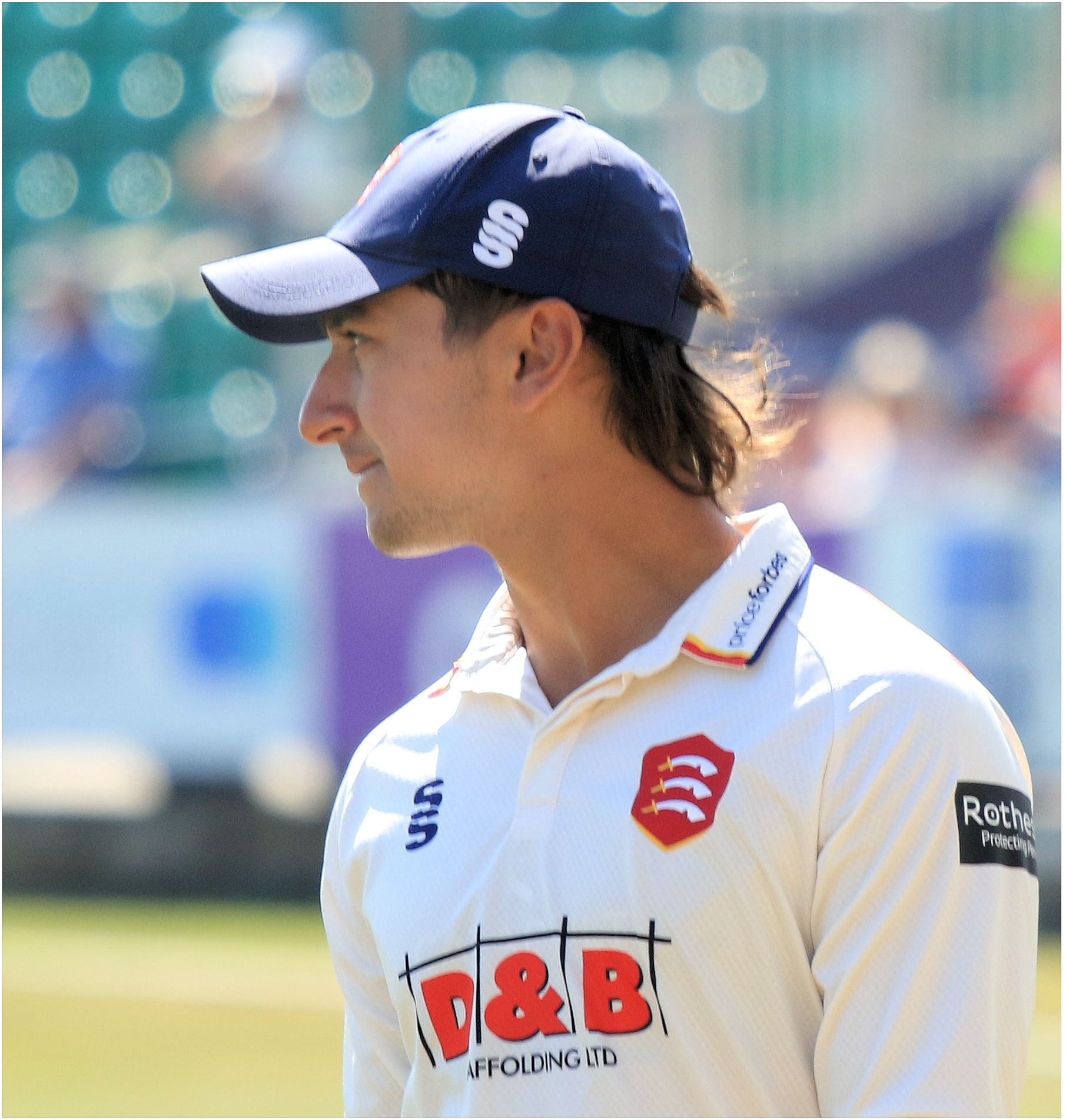
- Das in 2025

Personal information
- Full name: Robin James Das
- Born: 27 February 2002 (age 24); Leytonstone, London, England
- Batting: Right-handed
- Role: Batsman

Domestic team information
- Years: Team
- 2020–2026: Essex (squad no. 47)
- 2023: Dhaka Dominators
- FC debut: 26 May 2023 Essex v Ireland
- LA debut: 5 August 2022 Essex v Derbyshire

Career statistics
Competition	FC	LA	T20
Matches	9	29	24
Runs scored	327	805	341
Batting average	25.15	28.75	17.94
100s/50s	1/0	1/5	0/2
Top score	132	100*	72
Catches/stumpings	7/–	9/–	8/–
- Source: Cricinfo, 21 July 2026

Robin James Das (born 27 February 2002) is an English cricketer who played for Essex.

== Career ==
Das plays as a batsman. He scored 200 not out in an under-16 match in July 2018. He made his Twenty20 debut 20 September 2020, for Essex in the 2020 t20 Blast. In 2022, he was a substitute fielder for England in a match against New Zealand at Lord's. He made his List A debut on 5 August 2022, for Essex in the 2022 Royal London One-Day Cup. In January 2023, he was signed by the Dhaka Dominators to play for them in the 2022–23 Bangladesh Premier League.

He made his first-class cricket debut on 26 May 2023 as Essex played against Ireland at Chelmsford.

On 9 October 2026 Essex confirmed that, as his contract had expired, Das had been released from the club immediately.

== Personal life ==
Das is from East London, and is a British Bangladeshi. His family are from the Sylhet Division of Bangladesh. His brother Jonathan has played cricket for the Essex Second XI and Cambridge University. As of 2023, Das was studying history. On 23 July 2026 he was charged with two counts of rape in Brixton.
