= Toby Greatwood =

English cricketer (born 2001)

Personal information
- Full name: Toby Louis Greatwood
- Born: 21 October 2001 (age 25); High Wycombe, Buckinghamshire, England
- Batting: Right-handed
- Bowling: Right-arm medium
- Role: Bowler

Domestic team information
- Years: Team
- 2021–2022: Middlesex (squad no. 31)
- List A debut: 6 August 2021 Middlesex v Kent

Career statistics
Competition	LA	T20
Matches	7	2
Runs scored	15	–
Batting average	14.00	–
100s/50s	0/0	–
Top score	7*	–
Balls bowled	300	42
Wickets	9	1
Bowling average	33.55	69.00
5 wickets in innings	0	0
10 wickets in match	0	0
Best bowling	2/30	1/35
Catches/stumpings	0/–	1/–
- Source: Cricinfo, 9 September 2021

Toby Louis Greatwood (born 21 October 2001) is an English cricketer. He made his List A debut on 6 August 2021, for Middlesex in the 2021 Royal London One-Day Cup. He made his Twenty20 debut on 5 June 2022, for Middlesex in the 2022 T20 Blast.
