= Nathan Bowley =

English cricketer

Personal information
- Full name: Nathan John Bowley
- Born: 3 August 2001 (age 25); Nottingham, England
- Batting: Left-handed
- Bowling: Right-arm off break
- Role: All-rounder

Domestic team information
- Years: Team
- 2022: Leicestershire
- LA debut: 2 August 2022 Leicestershire v Surrey

Career statistics
Competition	List A
Matches	2
Runs scored	50
Batting average	50
100s/50s	0/1
Top score	50
Balls bowled	72
Wickets	0
Bowling average	–
5 wickets in innings	–
10 wickets in match	–
Best bowling	–
Catches/stumpings	0/–
- Source: , 4 September 2022

Nathan John Bowley (born 3 August 2001) is an English cricketer who plays for Leicestershire County Cricket Club. He is a left-handed batter and right-arm off break bowler.

== Early life ==
Bowley had been involved with Leicestershire cricket since he was 13 years old. He was educated at Loughborough University.

== Career ==
In 2018 Bowley was named the Talent Cricket Young Player of the Season. That year he took 4–70 on debut for the Leicestershire second-XI as a 17-year-old. He signed his first professional contract with Leicestershire County Cricket Club in January 2020. This was extended in July 2020 after Bowley had a leading role in Leicestershire winning back to back under-17 one day championships, taking 4-20 from 9 overs in the final. The new contract took him to the end of 2022.

Bowley made his List A debut on 2 August 2022 in the Royal London One-Day Cup for Leicestershire against Surrey County Cricket Club at Guilford. He scored his maiden half century during his second match, against Middlesex at Radlett on 4 August 2022.
