= Ben Wells (cricketer) =

English cricketer (born 2000)

Personal information
- Full name: Ben Joseph James Wells
- Born: 30 July 2000 (age 26); Bath, Somerset, England
- Batting: Right-handed
- Role: Wicket-keeper

Domestic team information
- Years: Team
- 2021–2024: Gloucestershire (squad no. 72)
- Only FC: 12 September 2021 Gloucestershire v Glamorgan
- LA debut: 25 July 2021 Gloucestershire v Lancashire

Career statistics
Competition	FC	LA	T20
Matches	1	15	9
Runs scored	40	339	135
Batting average	40.00	28.25	16.87
100s/50s	0/0	1/1	0/0
Top score	40	108*	43*
Catches/stumpings	2/0	6/0	1/0
- Source: Cricinfo, 30 September 2023

Ben Joseph James Wells (born 30 July 2000) is an English former professional cricketer. He made his List A debut on 25 July 2021, for Gloucestershire in the 2021 Royal London One-Day Cup.

== Career ==
Originally from Bath, Wells attended Monkton Combe School. He graduated with a BSc in Physics from the University of Exeter where he was also captain of the First XI. He was part of the Somerset academy and played for their second XI before signing a contract with Gloucestershire in June 2021. He made his first-class debut on 12 September 2021, for Gloucestershire in the 2021 County Championship. He made his Twenty20 debut on 29 May 2022, for Gloucestershire against the Sri Lanka Cricket Development XI during their tour of England. On 1 May 2024, he announced his retirement from professional cricket at the age of 23.
