= Feroze Khushi =

English cricketer (born 1999)

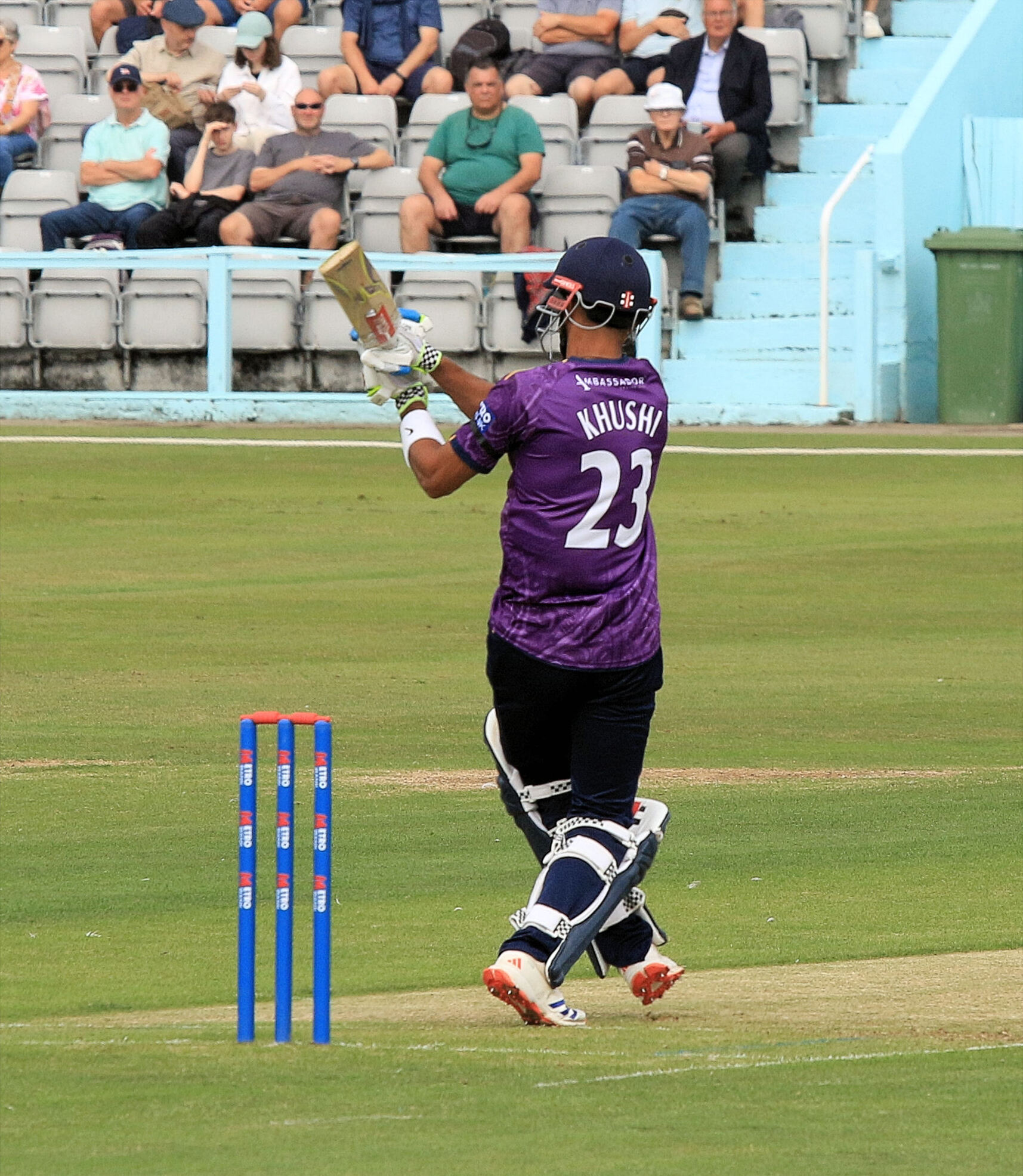
- Khushi batting for Essex in 2024

Personal information
- Full name: Feroze Isa Nazir Khushi
- Born: 23 June 1999 (age 27); Whipps Cross, Waltham Forest, London
- Batting: Right-handed
- Bowling: Right-arm off break
- Role: Batter

Domestic team information
- Years: Team
- 2019–2021: Suffolk
- 2020–2024: Essex (squad no. 23)
- 2024: → Kent (on loan) (squad no. 22)
- FC debut: 1 August 2020 Essex v Kent
- LA debut: 8 August 2021 Essex v Durham

Career statistics
Competition	FC	LA	T20
Matches	18	22	25
Runs scored	766	761	509
Batting average	27.35	36.23	21.20
100s/50s	2/4	3/2	0/4
Top score	164	118	67
Catches/stumpings	13/–	11/–	3/–
- Source: Cricinfo, 19 August 2024

Feroze Isa Nazir Khushi (born 23 June 1999) is an English cricketer. He made his first-class debut on 1 August 2020, for Essex in the 2020 Bob Willis Trophy. He made his Twenty20 debut 20 September 2020, for Essex in the 2020 t20 Blast. He made his List A debut on 8 August 2021, for Essex in the 2021 Royal London One-Day Cup. He made his maiden first-class hundred on 6 September, playing for Essex in the 2022 County Championship.
