= Neil Pratt =

English cricket umpire

Personal information
- Full name: Neil Pratt
- Born: 8 June 1972 (age 54); Bishop Auckland, County Durham, England
- Role: Umpire

Umpiring information
- FC umpired: 58 (2022–present)
- LA umpired: 39 (2022–present)
- T20 umpired: 66 (2022–present)
- Source: Cricinfo, 05 October 2026

Neil Pratt (born 8 June 1972) is an English cricket umpire who has stood in first-class cricket matches as well as in Twenty20 matches. He has also officiated a number of games in The Hundred men's and women's competition. As of April 2023, Pratt had officiated in more than 60 first-class and List A fixtures.
