= Michael Finan =

English cricketer

Mike Finan
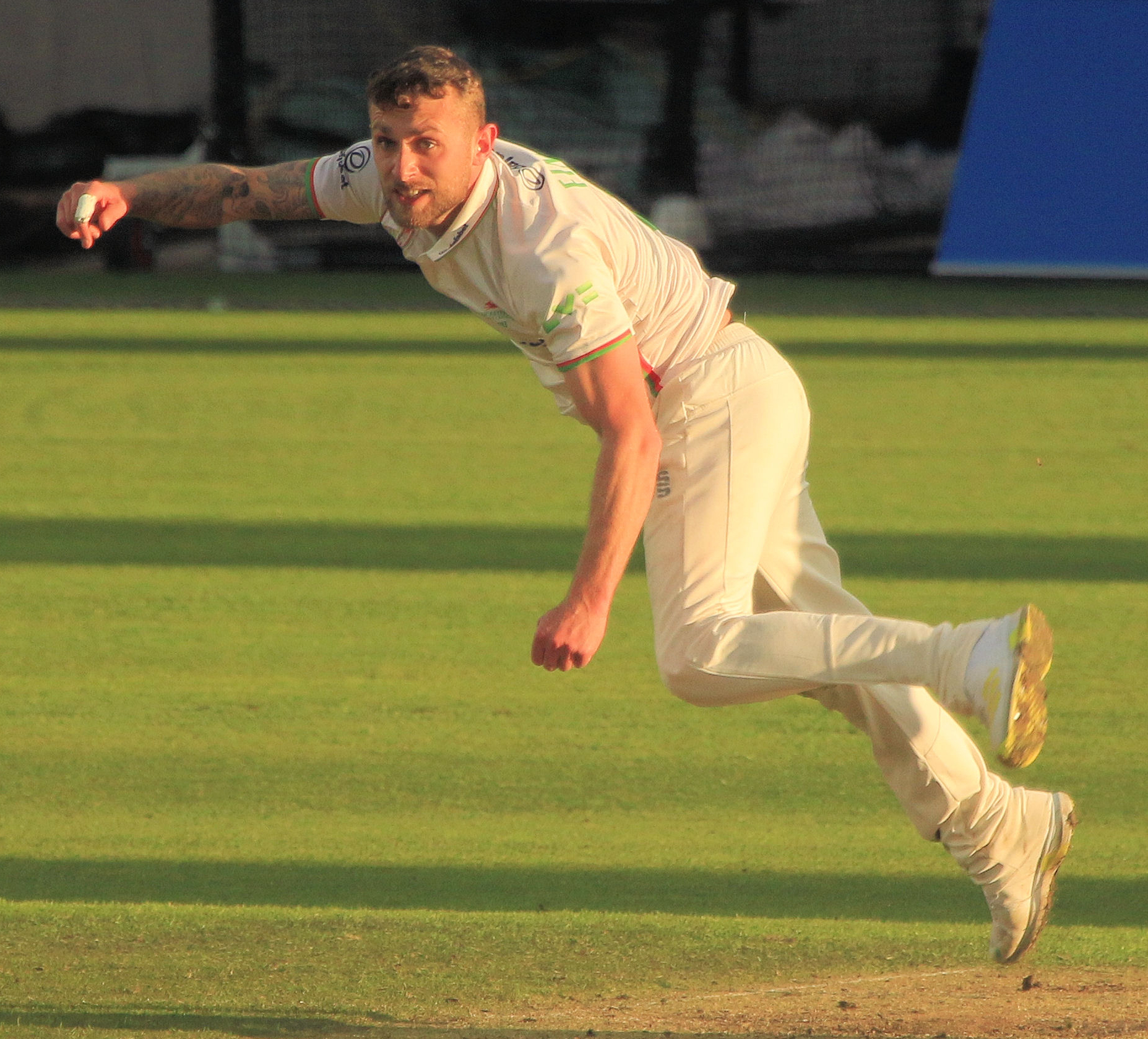
- Finan in 2023

Personal information
- Full name: Michael George Anthony Finan
- Born: 6 August 1996 (age 30); Tameside, Cheshire, England
- Batting: Right-handed
- Bowling: Left-arm medium
- Role: Bowler

Domestic team information
- Years: Team
- 2022–2023: Leicestershire (squad no. 4)
- 2024: Northamptonshire (squad no. 4)
- First-class debut: 5 September 2022 Leicestershire v Notts
- List A debut: 20 August 2022 Leicestershire v Notts

Career statistics
Competition	FC	LA	T20
Matches	9	4	7
Runs scored	141	18	55
Batting average	11.75	6.00	11.00
100s/50s	0/1	0/0	0/0
Top score	58	15	20
Balls bowled	1,020	144	147
Wickets	21	0	7
Bowling average	41.19	–	37.57
5 wickets in innings	1	–	0
10 wickets in match	0	–	0
Best bowling	5/58	–	3/39
Catches/stumpings	2/–	2/–	6/–
- Source: ESPNcricinfo, 19 August 2024

Michael George Anthony Finan (born 11 August 1996) is an English cricketer who most recently played for Leicestershire County Cricket Club. He is a right-handed bat and left-arm medium pace bowler.

== Early life ==
From Dukinfield, Finan had played in the Lancashire system between under-14s to under-19 level, as well as for Dukinfield between the ages of nine and 18.

== Career ==
Finan signed for Leicestershire in August 2022 after a short trial. He had previously played for Cheshire in the minor counties and second-XI cricket for Yorkshire and Northants.

Finan made his List-A debut for Leicestershire on the 20 August 2022 against Nottinghamshire. Finan made his first class debut for Leicestershire on 5 September 2022 against Nottinghamshire at Trent Bridge. Notts won the match by 241 runs but Finan hit a half-century on debut and his wickets included England international opener Haseeb Hameed. Finan took five wickets in an innings for the first time during his third first-class match, against Middlesex. He signed a two-year contract with Leicestershire on 1 November 2022.
