= Jonathan Bushnell =

English cricketer

Personal information
- Full name: Jonathan James Bushnell
- Born: 6 September 2001 (age 25); Durham, County Durham, England
- Batting: Right-handed
- Bowling: Right-arm medium

Domestic team information
- Years: Team
- 2021–2024: Durham
- FC debut: 12 June 2022 Durham v Worcs
- LA debut: 10 August 2022 Durham v Somerset

Career statistics
Competition	FC	LA	T20
Matches	9	15	10
Runs scored	353	212	107
Batting average	35.30	17.66	17.83
100s/50s	0/1	0/1	0/0
Top score	66	60*	40*
Balls bowled	449	374	90
Wickets	6	13	3
Bowling average	46.50	31.46	41.66
5 wickets in innings	0	0	0
10 wickets in match	0	0	0
Best bowling	1/9	3/56	1/6
Catches/stumpings	2/–	6/–	6/–
- Source: ESPNcricinfo, 19 August 2024

Jonathan James Bushnell (born 6 September 2001) is an English cricketer who most recently played for Durham County Cricket Club. He is a right-handed batsman and a right-arm medium pace bowler.

== Career ==
Bushnell came through the Durham academy and played second XI cricket as an opening batsman. In the winter of 2019/20 Bushnell travelled to play for Claremont-Nedlands in Perth, Australia alongside Durham teammate Cameron Steel. Bushnell's spell included scores of 108 not out and 83 not out for their second team. In September 2020 Bushnell was called up to the Young Lions England team. In October 2021, Bushnell signed a rookie contract with Durham.

=== 2022: First-class debut ===
Playing for the Durham 2nd XI in 2022, Bushnell scored 580 runs at an average of 75 and was voted Durham's 2nd XI Player of the Season with a top score of 187, made against Lancashire County Cricket Club's 2nd XI.

Bushnell made a half-century on his first-class debut for Durham against Worcestershire on the 12 June 2022 in a century stand with fellow debutant Rachin Ravindra. He made his Twenty20 debut for Durham, on 17 June 2022, against Yorkshire in the 2022 T20 Blast.

Bushnell made his List A debut for Durham against Somerset, on 10 August 2022, scoring 24 in a half-century partnership with Graham Clark. In December 2022 he signed a two-year professional contract with Durham.

=== 2023:First List-A half-century ===
Bushnell made his first List-A cricket half century on 1 August 2023, scoring an unbeaten 60 against Worcestershire. On 4 August 2023, he contributed an unbeaten 37 as Durham scored their highest ever list-A score of 427–9 against Sussex in Hove.

Bushnell left Durham when his contract expired in October 2024.
