= Louis Kimber =

English cricketer (born 1997)

Personal information
- Full name: Louis Philip James Kimber
- Born: 24 February 1997 (age 29); Scunthorpe, Lincolnshire, England
- Batting: Right-handed
- Bowling: Right-arm off break
- Relatives: Nick Kimber (brother)

Domestic team information
- Years: Team
- 2019: Loughborough MCCU
- 2021–2025: Leicestershire (squad no. 17)
- 2024–2025: Birmingham Phoenix
- 2026–: Northamptonshire (squad no. 17)
- FC debut: 26 March 2019 Loughborough MCCU v Leicestershire
- LA debut: 22 July 2021 Leicestershire v Derbyshire

Career statistics
Competition	FC	LA	T20
Matches	46	31	66
Runs scored	1,685	833	872
Batting average	24.42	34.70	17.79
100s/50s	2/9	1/6	0/5
Top score	243	102	59*
Balls bowled	1,299	245	216
Wickets	12	9	8
Bowling average	67.41	27.33	40.37
5 wickets in innings	0	0	0
10 wickets in match	0	0	0
Best bowling	1/5	4/61	2/14
Catches/stumpings	36/–	11/–	31/–
- Source: Cricinfo, 27 September 2026

Louis Philip James Kimber (born 24 February 1997) is an English cricketer. He made his first-class debut on 26 March 2019, for Loughborough MCCU against Leicestershire, as part of the Marylebone Cricket Club University fixtures. Prior to his first-class debut, he scored 162 not out from 55 balls in a twenty over match for Lincolnshire against Northumberland in May 2018. He made his Twenty20 debut on 13 June 2021, for Leicestershire in the 2021 T20 Blast. He made his List A debut on 22 July 2021, for Leicestershire in the 2021 Royal London One-Day Cup.

Kimber came to wide attention for his County Championship innings for Leicestershire against Sussex on 26 June 2024. Coming in at 144 for six with Leicestershire chasing 464 on the final day, Kimber scored 243 from only 127 balls. His innings featured the fastest double-century (100 balls) and most sixes (21) ever in the County Championship. He also hit Ollie Robinson for the most expensive over in first class cricket history: (Note: More expensive overs have been conceded, but aren't counted as records because the bowler was trying to give away runs to contrive an unlikely result. See Wikipedia's list of first-class cricket records: most runs in an over for further details. Robinson, an international bowler, was in this case earnestly trying to get Kimber out.) Kimber scored 37 runs from six legal deliveries and three no balls – the total cost of the over including the extras was 43. Kimber was the last Leicestershire batter dismissed, having taken Leicestershire to within only 18 runs of a victory that had earlier seemed impossible.

In September 2025 it was announced that Kimber would be leaving Leicestershire following the end of that year's county season. The following month he joined Northamptonshire on a two-year contract. In November 2026, Kimber agreed a contract extension with Northamptonshire tying him into the club until at least the end of the 2028 season.
