= Kent County Cricket Club in 2021 =

2021 season of an English cricket team

Kent County Cricket Club
2021 season
- Coach: (England) Matthew Walker
- Captain: (England) Sam Billings
- Overseas players: (South Africa) Heino Kuhn (Cricket West Indies) Miguel Cummins (Afghanistan) Qais Ahmad (T20 only) (New Zealand) Adam Milne (T20 only)
- Ground(s): St Lawrence Ground, Canterbury; County Ground, Beckenham
- County Championship: Winners, Division Three
- One-Day Cup: 9th, Group A
- T20 Blast: Winners

In 2021 Kent County Cricket Club competed in the 2021 County Championship, the 2021 One-Day Cup and the 2021 T20 Blast. The season was the fifth in charge for head coach, and former player, Matthew Walker. Sam Billings retained the club captaincy that he was first awarded in 2018. Daniel Bell-Drummond was named as vice-captain, replacing Joe Denly. Jack Leaning was named as captain for the One-Day Cup.

As a result of Brexit, the ECB confirmed that all Kolpak contracts would be terminated after the 2020 season. Counties were instead able to field two overseas players in all formats. Heino Kuhn, who had been contracted to Kent under a Kolpak deal, was, as a result, counted as an overseas player for this season.

On 18 September, during the T20 Blast Finals day at Edgbaston, Kent defeated Sussex in the semi-final. In the final, Kent defeated Somerset by 25 runs to win the tournament for a second time. This was the first trophy for the county since winning the 2007 Twenty20 Cup.

== Squad ==
=== Departures ===
All-rounder Calum Haggett and bowler Ivan Thomas were both released by the club after their contracts expired at the end of the 2020 season.

On 20 May, 27-year-old left-arm spin bowler Imran Qayyum announced his retirement from all cricket due to a shoulder injury. On 20 July, bowler Tim Groenewald retired from professional cricket following ankle surgery in April.

=== Arrivals ===
In March 2021, Kent announced the signing of West Indian international fast bowler Miguel Cummins for the first eight matches of the County Championship. Zimbabwean born batsman Tawanda Muyeye, who qualifies as a domestic player having been educated at Eastbourne College, signed his first professional contract with the club on 31 March 2021. Muyeye was voted the Young Wisden Schools Cricketer of the Year in the 2020 edition of the almanack.

On 20 April, Kent announced the signing of former Pakistan international fast bowler Mohammad Amir for the second half of the T20 Blast. On 8 June, however, it was confirmed that Amir would be unable to join up with the squad due to rescheduling of the Pakistan Super League and COVID-19-related travel restrictions. New Zealand bowler Adam Milne was announced as a replacement for Amir, with Milne returning for a fourth spell with the county.

On 5 May, following a number of injuries to bowlers, Kent announced the loan signing of New Zealand-born Matt Quinn from Essex for their next four Championship matches. On 16 June, Quinn signed a three-year contract to join the county from 2022 and also rejoined on loan for the remainder of the 2021 season.

On 12 May, Kent announced the signing of Afghanistan leg spin bowler Qais Ahmad for the T20 Blast. On 9 June, Kent signed left-arm spin bowler James Logan on a short-term contract. Logan signed a two-year contract extension on 27 June.

After an unnamed played tested positive for COVID-19, all players who were in the squad for the T20 Blast match against Surrey on 9 July were forced to self-isolate. Kent called up a number of second team players and signed other homegrown players to join the remainder of the senior squad for a Championship game against Sussex; Joe Gordon, Harry Houillon, Dan Lincoln, Jas Singh and Bailey Wightman all made their first-class debuts, and Harry Finch played his first game for Kent against his former team. Kent signed three Scotland international players – Calum MacLeod, George Munsey and Safyaan Sharif – to strengthen the squad for the last two matches of the T20 Blast group stage. Elliot Hooper also made his Kent debut in the T20 Blast fixture against Middlesex, having previously played a single first-class game for Sussex. Munsey was also named in the squad for the One-Day Cup.

=== Squad list ===
- Ages given as of the first day of the County Championship, 8 April 2021.

No.	Name	Nationality	Birth date	Batting style	Bowling style	Notes
Batsmen
4	Heino Kuhn	South Africa	1 April 1984 (aged 37)	Right-handed	—	Overseas player
6	Joe Denly	England	16 March 1986 (aged 35)	Right-handed	Right-arm leg break	
10	Alex Blake	England	25 January 1989 (aged 32)	Left-handed	Right-arm off break	White-ball contract only
13	Joe Gordon	England	18 May 2002 (aged 18)	Right-handed	Right-arm medium	
14	Tawanda Muyeye	Zimbabwe	5 March 2001 (aged 20)	Right-handed	Right-arm off break	Qualifies as a domestic player
16	Zak Crawley	England	3 February 1998 (aged 23)	Right-handed	Right-arm medium	
23	Daniel Bell-Drummond	England	3 August 1993 (aged 27)	Right-handed	Right-arm medium	Vice-captain
25	Dan Lincoln	England	26 May 1995 (aged 25)	Right-handed	Right-arm medium	
34	Jack Leaning	England	18 October 1993 (aged 27)	Right-handed	Right-arm medium/off break	
72	Harry Finch	England	10 February 1995 (aged 26)	Right-handed	Right-arm medium-fast	
93	George Munsey	Scotland	21 February 1993 (aged 28)	Left-handed	Right-arm medium-fast	One-Day Cup and two T20s only
All-rounders
3	Darren Stevens	England	30 April 1976 (aged 44)	Right-handed	Right arm medium	
9	Grant Stewart	Australia	19 February 1994 (aged 27)	Right-handed	Right-arm medium	EU passport
55	Marcus O'Riordan	England	25 January 1998 (aged 23)	Right-handed	Right-arm off break	
Wicket-keepers
7	Sam Billings	England	15 June 1991 (aged 29)	Right-handed	—	Club captain
21	Ollie Robinson	England	1 December 1998 (aged 22)	Right-handed	—	
22	Jordan Cox	England	21 October 2000 (aged 20)	Right-handed	—	
Bowlers
1	Harry Podmore	England	23 July 1994 (aged 26)	Right-handed	Right-arm medium	
8	Matt Milnes	England	29 July 1994 (aged 26)	Right-handed	Right-arm medium-fast	
11	Imran Qayyum	England	23 May 1993 (aged 27)	Right-handed	Slow left-arm orthodox	Retired on 20 May
17	Nathan Gilchrist	South Africa	11 June 2000 (aged 20)	Left-handed	Right-arm fast-medium	UK passport
20	Adam Milne	New Zealand	13 April 1992 (aged 28)	Right-handed	Right-arm fast	Overseas player; T20 Blast only
18	Fred Klaassen	Netherlands	13 November 1992 (aged 28)	Right-handed	Left-arm medium-fast	
27	James Logan	England	12 October 1997 (aged 23)	Left-handed	Slow left-arm orthodox	
32	Qais Ahmad	Afghanistan	15 August 2000 (aged 20)	Right-handed	Right-arm leg break	Overseas player; T20 Blast only
34	Tim Groenewald	England	10 January 1984 (aged 37)	Right-handed	Right-arm fast-medium	Retired on 20 July
41	Miguel Cummins	West Indies	5 September 1990 (aged 30)	Left-handed	Right-arm fast-medium	Overseas player
64	Matt Quinn	New Zealand	28 February 1993 (aged 28)	Right-handed	Right-arm medium-fast	On loan from Essex; UK passport
75	Hamidullah Qadri	England	5 January 2000 (aged 21)	Right-handed	Right-arm off break	

The following second team players and short-term signings also featured in matches, but were not members of the long-term squad during the season: Harry Houillon, Calum MacLeod, Safyaan Sharif, Jas Singh, Elliot Hooper and Bailey Wightman.

== County Championship ==
The County Championship returned in 2021 after the impact of the COVID-19 pandemic had forced its cancellation in 2020. The tournament was contested in a new format, replacing the two division structure. For the first phase of the tournament, teams were split into three groups of six. Kent were placed in Group 3 where they played ten matches against their opponents on a home and away basis. The top two teams from each group advanced to Division One for the second phase of the competition (where a further four matches will be played), with the other teams progressing to Divisions Two and Three. The team that finished top of Division One would be the county champions; the top two teams from Division One would then contest a five-day match at Lord's for the Bob Willis Trophy.

=== Group 3 ===
Team	Pld	W	L	T	D	A	Bat	Bowl	Ded	PCF	Pts	Qualification
Lancashire	10	4	1	0	5	0	22	24	0	0	150	Qualification for Division One
Yorkshire	10	5	1	0	4	0	14	23	0	0	149	Qualification for Division One
Glamorgan	10	2	2	0	6	0	18	29	0	0	127	Qualification for Division Two
Northamptonshire	10	3	3	0	4	0	22	21	0	0	123	Qualification for Division Two
Kent	10	0	3	0	7	0	15	26	0	0	97	Qualification for Division Three
Sussex	10	1	5	0	4	0	18	28	0	0	94	Qualification for Division Three

Updated to match(es) played on 14 July 2021. Source: BBC Sport, CricInfo

8–11 August	Kent	v	Northamptonshire (H)	Match drawn
Scorecard	455 (128.5 overs); DI Stevens 116* (134); NL Buck 3/84 (24 overs)		434 (123.4 overs); RS Vasconcelos 154 (209); HW Podmore 4/77 (21.4 overs)	County Ground, Northampton; Umpires: RJ Bailey and PR Pollard
Scorecard	42/1 (13.1 overs); Z Crawley 19* (34); BW Sanderson 1/6 (6 overs)			County Ground, Northampton; Umpires: RJ Bailey and PR Pollard
Northamptonshire won the toss and chose to field.; Points: Northamptonshire 15, Kent 14; ML Cummins played his first game for Kent.; Darren Stevens, at 44 years and 344 days, became the oldest player to score a century in the County Championship since 1986.

15–18 April	Yorkshire	v	Kent (H)	Yorkshire won by 200 runs
Scorecard	379 (105.2 overs); A Lyth 97 (116); DI Stevens 4/60 (19.2 overs)		265 (87.1 overs); DI Stevens 52 (99); SA Patterson 3/43 (18 overs)	St Lawrence Ground, Canterbury; Umpires: IJ Gould and MJ Saggers
Scorecard	330/5d (75.2 overs); A Lyth 116 (169); JL Denly 2/61 (13.2 overs)		244 (88.4 overs); ME Milnes 78 (210); DJ Willey 5/61 (16.4 overs)	St Lawrence Ground, Canterbury; Umpires: IJ Gould and MJ Saggers
Yorkshire won the toss and chose to bat.; Points: Kent 5, Yorkshire 23

22–25 April	Lancashire	v	Kent (H)	Lancashire won by an innings and 5 runs
Scorecard	525 (167.2 overs); DJ Lamb 125 (232); DI Stephens 2/44 (26 overs)		169 (50.3 overs); Z Crawley 60 (65); TE Bailey 4/46 (15 overs)	St Lawrence Ground, Canterbury; Umpires: NJ Llong and BV Taylor
Scorecard			351 (138 overs) (f/o); DJ Bell-Drummond 108* (203); MW Parkinson 7/156 (52 overs)	St Lawrence Ground, Canterbury; Umpires: NJ Llong and BV Taylor
Kent won the toss and chose to field.; Points: Kent 2, Lancashire 22

29–30 April	Kent	v	Glamorgan (H)	Glamorgan won by 10 wickets
Scorecard	138 (45.3 overs); Z Crawley 33 (66); DL Lloyd 4/11 (7 overs)		197 (61.5 overs); DL Lloyd 62 (103); DI Stevens 5/53 (23 overs)	Sophia Gardens, Cardiff; Umpires: NL Bainton and ID Blackwell
Scorecard	74 (26.5 overs); HG Kuhn 14 (18); MG Hogan 5/28 (10 overs)		19/0 (2.2 overs); DL Lloyd 19* (8)	Sophia Gardens, Cardiff; Umpires: NL Bainton and ID Blackwell
Glamorgan won the toss and chose to field.; Points: Glamorgan 19, Kent 3

6–9 May	Yorkshire (H)	v	Kent	Match drawn
Scorecard	305 (111.3 overs); Z Crawley 90 (171); BO Coad 3/53 (22 overs)		321 (105.3 overs); GS Ballance 96 (201); NN Gilchrist 4/74 (18 overs)	Headingley, Leeds; Umpires: PJ Hartley and RA Kettleborough
Yorkshire won the toss and chose to field.; No play was possible on day three or before lunch on day four due to rain.; Stumps, day three. Points: Yorkshire 13, Kent 14; MR Quinn played his first game for Kent.

13–16 May	Kent	v	Sussex (H)	Match drawn
Scorecard	145 (54.3 overs); JA Leaning 63 (128); OE Robinson 3/29 (18 overs)		256 (76.3 overs); S van Zyl 52 (83); MR Quinn 4/54 (19.3 overs)	County Ground, Hove; Umpires: GD Lloyd and DJ Millns
Scorecard	387/4d (111 overs); JA Leaning 127* (263); JC Archer 1/14 (5 overs)			County Ground, Hove; Umpires: GD Lloyd and DJ Millns
Sussex won the toss and chose to field.; No play was possible before tea on day three, or before lunch on day four, due to rain.; Points: Sussex 13, Kent 11; TS Muyeye made his first-class debut.

20–23 May	Kent (H)	v	Glamorgan	Match drawn
Scorecard	307 (76.2 overs); DI Stevens 190 (149); T van der Gugten 4/34 (19 overs)		64/3d (26 overs); WT Root 26* (59); MR Quinn 2/10 (10 overs)	St Lawrence Ground, Canterbury; Umpires: RK Illingworth and JD Middlebrook
Scorecard	60/1d (10 overs); JM Cox 27* (27); MG Neser 1/28 (4 overs)		23/1 (7 overs); DL Lloyd 17 (14); MR Quinn 1/14 (4 overs)	St Lawrence Ground, Canterbury; Umpires: RK Illingworth and JD Middlebrook
Glamorgan won the toss and elected to field.; No play was possible before lunch on day two due to rain. Only 6.2 overs were bowled on day three due to a wet outfield. No play was possible after lunch on day four due to rain.; Points: Kent 12, Glamorgan 11

3–6 June	Northamptonshire	v	Kent (H)	Match drawn
Scorecard	392 (104.4 overs); EN Gay 101 (160); DI Stevens 5/73 (26.4 overs)		330/5d (69 overs); OG Robinson 120 (119); SC Kerrigan 2/80 (14 overs)	St Lawrence Ground, Canterbury; Umpires: IJ Gould and IN Ramage
Scorecard	184/8d (69 overs); AM Rossington 59* (124); NN Gilchrist 3/57 (15 overs)			St Lawrence Ground, Canterbury; Umpires: IJ Gould and IN Ramage
Northamptonshire won the toss and chose to bat.; No play was possible on day two due to rain.; Points: Kent 14, Northamptonshire 13

4–7 July	Kent	v	Lancashire (H)	Match drawn
Scorecard	74 (26.2 overs); DI Stevens 19 (24); JM Anderson 7/19 (10 overs)		259/9d (91 overs); L Wood 63* (103); MR Quinn 3/37 (15 overs)	Old Trafford, Manchester; Umpires: SJ O'Shaughnessy and RA White
Scorecard	149/8 (74 overs); JA Leaning 53* (199); TW Hartley 4/42 (30 overs)			Old Trafford, Manchester; Umpires: SJ O'Shaughnessy and RA White
Kent won the toss and elected to bat.; No play was possible on day one, or before lunch on days two, three and four, due to rain.; Points: Lancashire 13, Kent 11

11–14 July	Sussex	v	Kent (H)	Match drawn
Scorecard	181 (57.5 overs); JM Coles 36 (60); J Singh 4/51 (11 overs)		165 (51.5 overs); HW Podmore 37 (84); JA Atkins 5/51 (14 overs)	St Lawrence Ground, Canterbury; Umpires: Hassan Adnan and BV Taylor
Scorecard	332/4d (99 overs); AGH Orr 119 (254); MR Quinn 3/118 (24 overs)		275/7 (85.4 overs); HZ Finch 115 (212); JJ Carson 3/87 (32.4 overs)	St Lawrence Ground, Canterbury; Umpires: Hassan Adnan and BV Taylor
Kent won the toss and chose to field.; Points: Kent 11, Sussex 11; JA Gordon, HF Houillon, DJ Lincoln, J Singh and BJ Wightman all made their first-class debuts, and HZ Finch played his first game for Kent.; Due to an unnamed player testing positive for COVID-19, all players involved in the squad for the t20 Blast match against Surrey on 9 July were forced to self-isolate for 10 days, resulting in a number of second XI and other local players being selected for this match.; BJ Wightman replaced NN Gilchrist as a COVID-19 replacement on Day 2.

=== Division 3 ===
Team	Pld	W	L	T	D	A	Bat	Bowl	Ded	PCF	Pts
Kent	4	4	0	0	0	0	7	12	0	11	94
Middlesex	4	3	1	0	0	0	7	12	0	13	80
Worcestershire	4	2	2	0	0	0	5	12	0	18.5	67.5
Leicestershire	4	1	2	0	1	0	9	10	0	11.5	54.5
Derbyshire	4	1	2	0	1	0	8	10	0	9.5	51.5
Sussex	4	0	4	0	0	0	12	6	0	12	30

Source: CricketArchive, ESPNCricinfo

30 August – 2 September	Kent	v	Leicestershire (H)	Kent won by 132 runs
Scorecard	232 (70 overs); JA Leaning 75* (161); CF Parkinson 4/68 (28 overs)		109 (44.1 overs); E Barnes 22* (27); JEG Logan 3/8 (8.1 overs)	Grace Road, Leicester; Umpires: IJ Gould and CM Watts
Scorecard	262 (61 overs); DI Stevens 107* (70); CF Parkinson 5/75 (23 overs)		253 (51.2 overs); E Barnes 70* (74); ME Milnes 6/53 (12 overs)	Grace Road, Leicester; Umpires: IJ Gould and CM Watts
Kent won the toss and chose to bat.; Points: Leicestershire 3, Kent 20

5–8 September	Worcestershire	v	Kent (H)	Kent won by an innings and 56 runs
Scorecard	133 (39.4 overs); OB Cox 41* (72); NN Gilchrist 5/38 (11.4 overs)		393 (114.2 overs); JA Leaning 97 (259); D Pennington 4/80 (24 overs)	St Lawrence Ground, Canterbury; Umpires: Hassan Adnan and PR Pollard
Scorecard	204 (60.5 overs); J Leach 49* (54); NN Gilchrist 3/36 (13.5 overs)			St Lawrence Ground, Canterbury; Umpires: Hassan Adnan and PR Pollard
Kent won the toss and chose to field.; Points: Kent 23, Worcestershire 3

12–15 September	Kent	v	Derbyshire (H)	Kent won by 130 runs
Scorecard	285 (91.5 overs); JA Leaning 82* (167); BW Aitchison 4/83 (20.5 overs)		156 (43.3 overs); S Conners 39 (28); G Stewart 5/23 (13 overs)	County Ground, Derby; Umpires: NGB Cook and T Lungley
Scorecard	211/2d (50 overs); JM Cox 81 (138); MJJ Critchley 1/48 (9 overs)		210 (58.5 overs); AK Dal 58* (98); NN Gilchrist 4/30 (10.5 overs)	County Ground, Derby; Umpires: NGB Cook and T Lungley
Derbyshire won the toss and chose to field.; No play was possible on day three due to rain.; Points: Derbyshire 3, Kent 21

21–24 September	Middlesex	v	Kent (H)	Kent won by 2 wickets
Scorecard	147 (60.5 overs); MD Stoneman 59 (130); DI Stevens 4/21 (15 overs)		138 (54.4 overs); TS Muyeye 30 (46); ER Bamber 3/36 (19 overs)	St Lawrence Ground, Canterbury; Umpires: M Burns and BV Taylor
Scorecard	363 (86.4 overs); MD Stoneman 109 (148); ME Milnes 5/87 (19.4 overs)		375/8 (105.2 overs); OG Robinson 112 (163); TJ Murtagh 2/45 (25 overs)	St Lawrence Ground, Canterbury; Umpires: M Burns and BV Taylor
Kent won the toss and chose to field.; Points: Kent 19, Middlesex 3

== One-Day Cup ==
Due to the inaugural season of The Hundred being played at the same time, many of the top county cricketers were unavailable to play in the One-Day Cup. As well as several first-team players, Kent Head Coach Matt Walker was involved in The Hundred as Assistant Coach for the Oval Invincibles. Simon Cook took over as Interim Head Coach, Jack Leaning was named captain, and Ollie Robinson was named vice-captain for the tournament. Leaning was selected by the Trent Rockets as short-term cover for Steven Mullaney, meaning that he would miss games against Sussex and Essex, with Robinson taking over as captain.

=== Group A ===
Pos	Team	Pld	W	L	T	NR	Ded	Pts	NRR
1	Durham	8	6	1	0	1	0	13	0.921
2	Essex	8	5	2	1	0	0	11	0.238
3	Gloucestershire	7	4	3	0	0	0	8	0.094
4	Lancashire	8	3	2	1	2	0	9	0.014
5	Worcestershire	8	3	4	0	1	0	7	0.256
6	Hampshire	8	3	4	0	1	0	7	0.161
7	Sussex	8	2	4	0	2	0	6	−0.689
8	Middlesex (Note: Middlesex's match scheduled to play against Gloucestershire (8 August) was cancelled due to COVID-19. As a result, the Group A qualifications were decided on an average points per completed match basis.)	7	2	4	0	1	0	5	−0.286
9	Kent	8	1	5	0	2	0	4	−1.258

Updated to match(es) played on completed. Source: BBC Sport, Cricinfo.
Notes:

22 July	Durham; 405/4 (50 overs)	v	Kent (H); 302/8 (50 overs)	Durham won by 103 runs
Scorecard	Durham; 405/4 (50 overs)	v	Kent (H); 302/8 (50 overs)	County Ground, Beckenham; Umpires: NGB Cook and CM Watts
Scorecard	G Clark 141 (119); DI Stevens 1/50 (8 overs)		HG Munsey 96 (79); C Rushworth 3/29 (7 overs)	County Ground, Beckenham; Umpires: NGB Cook and CM Watts
Kent won the toss and chose to field.; Points: Kent 0, Durham 2; JEG Logan, TS Muyeye and MK O'Riordan all made their List A debuts.				County Ground, Beckenham; Umpires: NGB Cook and CM Watts

25 July	Kent; 322/7 (50 overs)	v	Worcestershire (H); 323/7 (49.1 overs)	Worcestershire won by 3 wickets
Scorecard	Kent; 322/7 (50 overs)	v	Worcestershire (H); 323/7 (49.1 overs)	New Road, Worcester; Umpires: T Lungley and PR Pollard
Scorecard	HG Munsey 108 (113); EG Bernard 2/72 (9 overs)		J Leach 88 (51); JEG Logan 2/45 (8 overs)	New Road, Worcester; Umpires: T Lungley and PR Pollard
Worcestershire won the toss and chose to field.; Points: Worcestershire 2, Kent 0				New Road, Worcester; Umpires: T Lungley and PR Pollard

28 July	Lancashire; 71/0 (14.5 overs)	v	Kent (H)	No result
Scorecard	Lancashire; 71/0 (14.5 overs)	v	Kent (H)	County Ground, Beckenham; Umpires: ID Blackwell and IJ Gould
Scorecard	JJ Bohannon 39* (54)			County Ground, Beckenham; Umpires: ID Blackwell and IJ Gould
Kent won the toss and chose to field.; No further play was possible due to rain.; Points: Kent 1, Lancashire 1; NN Gilchrist made his List A debut.				County Ground, Beckenham; Umpires: ID Blackwell and IJ Gould

30 July	Sussex (H); 209/7 (29 overs)	v	Kent; 50/1 (5.4 overs)	No result
Scorecard	Sussex (H); 209/7 (29 overs)	v	Kent; 50/1 (5.4 overs)	County Ground, Hove; Umpires: BJ Debenham and IJ Gould
Scorecard	TM Head 52 (37); NN Gilchrist 3/45 (6 overs)		TS Muyeye 24* (12); JM Coles 1/2 (0.4 overs)	County Ground, Hove; Umpires: BJ Debenham and IJ Gould
Kent won the toss and chose to field.; The match was reduced to 29 overs per side due to rain.; Points: Sussex 1, Kent 1				County Ground, Hove; Umpires: BJ Debenham and IJ Gould

1 August	Kent; 158 (47.5 overs)	v	Essex (H); 159/1 (31.1 overs)	Essex won by 9 wickets
Scorecard	Kent; 158 (47.5 overs)	v	Essex (H); 159/1 (31.1 overs)	County Ground, Chelmsford; Umpires: IJ Gould and JD Middlebrook
Scorecard	HG Munsey 39 (62); RN ten Doeschate 2/7 (3 overs)		AN Cook 77* (90); ME Milnes 1/29 (5 overs)	County Ground, Chelmsford; Umpires: IJ Gould and JD Middlebrook
Kent won the toss and chose to bat.; Points: Essex 2, Kent 0				County Ground, Chelmsford; Umpires: IJ Gould and JD Middlebrook

6 August	Kent; 217/9 (35 overs)	v	Middlesex (H); 196 (32.3 overs)	Kent won by 21 runs
Scorecard	Kent; 217/9 (35 overs)	v	Middlesex (H); 196 (32.3 overs)	Radlett Cricket Club, Radlett; Umpires: NA Mallender and RA White
Scorecard	MK O'Riordan 60 (51); ER Bamber 3/41 (7 overs)		JM de Caires 43 (40); NN Gilchrist 5/45 (6.3 overs)	Radlett Cricket Club, Radlett; Umpires: NA Mallender and RA White
Middlesex won the toss and chose to field.; The match was reduced to 35 overs per side due to rain.; Points: Middlesex 0, Kent 2				Radlett Cricket Club, Radlett; Umpires: NA Mallender and RA White

8 August	Kent (H); 105 (22.5 overs)	v	Hampshire; 107/4 (18.2 overs)	Hampshire won by 6 wickets
Scorecard	Kent (H); 105 (22.5 overs)	v	Hampshire; 107/4 (18.2 overs)	County Ground, Beckenham; Umpires: BV Taylor and CM Watts
Scorecard	OG Robinson 27 (35); IG Holland 4/12 (5 overs)		TP Alsop 37 (43); HW Podmore 2/26 (4.2 overs)	County Ground, Beckenham; Umpires: BV Taylor and CM Watts
Hampshire won the toss and elected to field.; The match was reduced to 24 overs per side due to rain. Hampshire were set a revised target of 107 runs to win.; Points: Kent 0, Hampshire 2; JA Gordon made his List A debut.				County Ground, Beckenham; Umpires: BV Taylor and CM Watts

12 August	Kent (H); 218/9 (50 overs)	v	Gloucestershire; 219/2 (37.4 overs)	Gloucestershire won by 8 wickets
Scorecard	Kent (H); 218/9 (50 overs)	v	Gloucestershire; 219/2 (37.4 overs)	County Ground, Beckenham; Umpires: NGB Cook and IN Ramage
Scorecard	OG Robinson 75 (102); GL van Buuren 3/34 (10 overs)		CDJ Dent 112* (108); JEG Logan 1/35 (5 overs)	County Ground, Beckenham; Umpires: NGB Cook and IN Ramage
Gloucestershire won the toss and chose to field.; Points: Kent 0, Gloucestershire 2				County Ground, Beckenham; Umpires: NGB Cook and IN Ramage

== T20 Blast ==
=== South Group ===
Pos	Team	Pld	W	L	T	NR	Pts	NRR
1	Kent Spitfires	14	9	4	0	1	19	0.657
2	Somerset	14	8	4	0	2	18	0.371
3	Sussex Sharks	14	6	3	0	5	17	0.479
4	Hampshire Hawks	14	6	5	0	3	15	0.388
5	Surrey	14	6	5	0	3	15	0.332
6	Gloucestershire	14	6	6	0	2	14	0.201
7	Essex Eagles	14	5	8	0	1	11	−0.468
8	Middlesex	14	4	9	0	1	9	−0.389
9	Glamorgan	14	3	9	0	2	8	−1.371

Updated to match(es) played on 18 July 2021. Source: BBC Sport

9 June	Kent (H); 176/6 (20 overs)	v	Hampshire; 138/9 (20 overs)	Kent won by 38 runs
Scorecard	Kent (H); 176/6 (20 overs)	v	Hampshire; 138/9 (20 overs)	St Lawrence Ground, Canterbury; Umpires: Hassan Adnan and RJ Bailey; Player of the match: FJ Klaassen (Kent)
Scorecard	OG Robinson 48 (36); MS Crane 3/23 (4 overs)		JJ Weatherley 37 (22); FJ Klaassen 4/32 (4 overs)	St Lawrence Ground, Canterbury; Umpires: Hassan Adnan and RJ Bailey; Player of the match: FJ Klaassen (Kent)
Hampshire won the toss and chose to field.; Points: Kent 2, Hampshire 0; JEG Logan made his Twenty20 debut and played his first game for Kent.				St Lawrence Ground, Canterbury; Umpires: Hassan Adnan and RJ Bailey; Player of the match: FJ Klaassen (Kent)

11 June	Kent (H); 178/8 (20 overs)	v	Middlesex; 162/8 (20 overs)	Kent won by 16 runs
Scorecard	Kent (H); 178/8 (20 overs)	v	Middlesex; 162/8 (20 overs)	St Lawrence Ground, Canterbury; Umpires: PJ Hartley and AG Wharf; Player of the match: JA Leaning (Kent)
Scorecard	JA Leaning 64 (42); CJ Green 5/32 (4 overs)		LBK Hollman 51 (33); DI Stevens 3/32 (4 overs)	St Lawrence Ground, Canterbury; Umpires: PJ Hartley and AG Wharf; Player of the match: JA Leaning (Kent)
Middlesex won the toss and elected to field.; Points: Kent 2, Middlesex 0				St Lawrence Ground, Canterbury; Umpires: PJ Hartley and AG Wharf; Player of the match: JA Leaning (Kent)

13 June	Kent (H); 183/5 (20 overs)	v	Gloucestershire; 178/8 (20 overs)	Kent won by 5 runs
Scorecard	Kent (H); 183/5 (20 overs)	v	Gloucestershire; 178/8 (20 overs)	St Lawrence Ground, Canterbury; Umpires: NL Bainton and GD Lloyd; Player of the match: JA Leaning (Kent)
Scorecard	JA Leaning 81* (51); DA Payne 3/30 (4 overs)		BAC Howell 44 (23); JL Denly 2/20 (3 overs)	St Lawrence Ground, Canterbury; Umpires: NL Bainton and GD Lloyd; Player of the match: JA Leaning (Kent)
Kent won the toss and chose to bat.; Points: Kent 2, Gloucestershire 0; Qais Ahmad made his Kent debut.				St Lawrence Ground, Canterbury; Umpires: NL Bainton and GD Lloyd; Player of the match: JA Leaning (Kent)

15 June	Somerset (H); 204/7 (20 overs)	v	Kent; 158 (18 overs)	Somerset won by 47 runs
Scorecard	Somerset (H); 204/7 (20 overs)	v	Kent; 158 (18 overs)	County Ground, Taunton; Umpires: BV Taylor and RJ Warren; Player of the match: TB Abell (Somerset)
Scorecard	TB Abell 68 (33); G Stewart 3/33 (4 overs)		Z Crawley 48 (23); M de Lange 3/18 (3 overs)	County Ground, Taunton; Umpires: BV Taylor and RJ Warren; Player of the match: TB Abell (Somerset)
Kent won the toss and elected to field.; Points: Somerset 2, Kent 0				County Ground, Taunton; Umpires: BV Taylor and RJ Warren; Player of the match: TB Abell (Somerset)

16 June	Kent; 144/7 (20 overs)	v	Glamorgan (H); 104 (17.4 overs)	Kent won by 40 runs
Scorecard	Kent; 144/7 (20 overs)	v	Glamorgan (H); 104 (17.4 overs)	Sophia Gardens, Cardiff; Umpires: ID Blackwell and IN Ramage; Player of the match: ME Milnes (Kent)
Scorecard	JM Cox 32* (24); DA Douthwaite 2/17 (3 overs)		WJ Weighell 24 (20); ME Milnes 5/23 (3.4 overs)	Sophia Gardens, Cardiff; Umpires: ID Blackwell and IN Ramage; Player of the match: ME Milnes (Kent)
Kent won the toss and chose to bat.; Points: Kent 2, Glamorgan 0				Sophia Gardens, Cardiff; Umpires: ID Blackwell and IN Ramage; Player of the match: ME Milnes (Kent)

20 June	Kent (H); 236/3 (20 overs)	v	Essex; 169 (19.2 overs)	Kent won by 67 runs
Scorecard	Kent (H); 236/3 (20 overs)	v	Essex; 169 (19.2 overs)	St Lawrence Ground, Canterbury; Umpires: BJ Debenham and PR Pollard; Player of the match: JA Leaning (Kent)
Scorecard	DJ Bell-Drummond 88 (44); PI Walter 1/21 (2 overs)		AJA Wheater 46 (29); JA Leaning 3/15 (2 overs)	St Lawrence Ground, Canterbury; Umpires: BJ Debenham and PR Pollard; Player of the match: JA Leaning (Kent)
Essex won the toss and chose to field.; Points: Kent 2, Essex 0; Kent's score of 236/3 was their highest Twenty20 Blast total.				St Lawrence Ground, Canterbury; Umpires: BJ Debenham and PR Pollard; Player of the match: JA Leaning (Kent)

22 June	Kent; 147/7 (20 overs)	v	Gloucestershire (H); 149/2 (13.4 overs)	Gloucestershire won by 8 wickets
Scorecard	Kent; 147/7 (20 overs)	v	Gloucestershire (H); 149/2 (13.4 overs)	County Ground, Bristol; Umpires: PK Baldwin and NGB Cook; Player of the match: GD Phillips (Gloucestershire)
Scorecard	Z Crawley 43 (29); TMJ Smith 2/17 (3 overs)		GD Phillips 41* (25); ME Milnes 1/15 (2 overs)	County Ground, Bristol; Umpires: PK Baldwin and NGB Cook; Player of the match: GD Phillips (Gloucestershire)
Gloucestershire won the toss and chose to field.; Points: Gloucestershire 2, Kent 0				County Ground, Bristol; Umpires: PK Baldwin and NGB Cook; Player of the match: GD Phillips (Gloucestershire)

25 June	Kent; 167/9 (20 overs)	v	Essex (H); 31/4 (5 overs)	Kent won by 28 runs (DLS Method)
Scorecard	Kent; 167/9 (20 overs)	v	Essex (H); 31/4 (5 overs)	County Ground, Chelmsford; Umpires: RJ Bailey and RA White; Player of the match: DJ Bell-Drummond (Kent)
Scorecard	DJ Bell-Drummond 50 (29); SR Harmer 4/26 (4 overs)		DW Lawrence 19* (13); ME Milnes 2/15 (3 overs)	County Ground, Chelmsford; Umpires: RJ Bailey and RA White; Player of the match: DJ Bell-Drummond (Kent)
Essex won the toss and elected to field.; No further play was possible due to rain; Points: Essex 0, Kent 2				County Ground, Chelmsford; Umpires: RJ Bailey and RA White; Player of the match: DJ Bell-Drummond (Kent)

28 June	Kent (H); 168/8 (20 overs)	v	Somerset; 169/0 (15.4 overs)	Somerset won by 10 wickets
Scorecard	Kent (H); 168/8 (20 overs)	v	Somerset; 169/0 (15.4 overs)	St Lawrence Ground, Canterbury; Umpires: BJ Debenham and PR Pollard; Player of the match: T Banton (Somerset)
Scorecard	Z Crawley 39 (32); L Gregory 4/27		T Banton 107* (51)	St Lawrence Ground, Canterbury; Umpires: BJ Debenham and PR Pollard; Player of the match: T Banton (Somerset)
Somerset won the toss and elected to field.; Points: Kent 0, Somerset 0				St Lawrence Ground, Canterbury; Umpires: BJ Debenham and PR Pollard; Player of the match: T Banton (Somerset)

29 June	Sussex (H)	v	Kent	Match abandoned
Scorecard	Sussex (H)	v	Kent	County Ground, Hove; Umpires: NA Mallender and N Pratt
No toss; No play was possible due to rain.; Points: Sussex 1, Kent 1				County Ground, Hove; Umpires: NA Mallender and N Pratt

2 July	Kent (H); 191/4 (20 overs)	v	Surrey; 180/6 (20 overs)	Kent won by 11 runs
Scorecard	Kent (H); 191/4 (20 overs)	v	Surrey; 180/6 (20 overs)	St Lawrence Ground, Canterbury; Umpires: NA Mallender and M Newell; Player of the match: WG Jacks (Surrey)
Scorecard	JM Cox 61* (28); WG Jacks 1/12 (2 overs)		WG Jacks 87 (54); AF Milne 4/38 (4 overs)	St Lawrence Ground, Canterbury; Umpires: NA Mallender and M Newell; Player of the match: WG Jacks (Surrey)
Kent won the toss and elected to bat.; Points: Kent 2, Surrey 0				St Lawrence Ground, Canterbury; Umpires: NA Mallender and M Newell; Player of the match: WG Jacks (Surrey)

9 July	Surrey (H); 128/7 (20 overs)	v	Kent; 129/1 (15.3 overs)	Kent won by 9 wickets
Scorecard	Surrey (H); 128/7 (20 overs)	v	Kent; 129/1 (15.3 overs)	The Oval, London; Umpires: IA Gould and T Lungley; Player of the match: DJ Bell-Drummond (Kent)
Scorecard	J Clark 37* (31); AF Milne 2/13 (4 overs)		DJ Bell-Drummond 53* (37); DT Moriarty 1/26 (4 overs)	The Oval, London; Umpires: IA Gould and T Lungley; Player of the match: DJ Bell-Drummond (Kent)
Kent won the toss and elected to field.; Points: Surrey 0, Kent 2				The Oval, London; Umpires: IA Gould and T Lungley; Player of the match: DJ Bell-Drummond (Kent)

16 July	Kent (H); 157/8 (20 overs)	v	Middlesex; 80 (16.3 overs)	Kent won by 77 runs
Scorecard	Kent (H); 157/8 (20 overs)	v	Middlesex; 80 (16.3 overs)	Lord's, London; Umpires: BJ Debenham and NJ Llong; Player of the match: EO Hooper (Kent)
Scorecard	HZ Finch 47 (35); BC Cullen 4/33 (4 overs)		Mujeeb Ur Rahman 13 (9); EO Hooper 3/24 (4 overs)	Lord's, London; Umpires: BJ Debenham and NJ Llong; Player of the match: EO Hooper (Kent)
Kent won the toss and chose to bat.; Points: Middlesex 0, Kent 2; EO Hooper made his T20 debut. CS MacLeod, HG Munsey and SM Sharif all also played their first game for Kent.				Lord's, London; Umpires: BJ Debenham and NJ Llong; Player of the match: EO Hooper (Kent)

18 July	Kent (H); 130/7 (20 overs)	v	Sussex; 134/6 (17.1 overs)	Sussex won by 4 wickets
Scorecard	Kent (H); 130/7 (20 overs)	v	Sussex; 134/6 (17.1 overs)	St Lawrence Ground, Canterbury; Umpires: NL Bainton and RJ Warren; Player of the match: RS Bopara (Sussex)
Scorecard	CS MacLeod 31 (27); RS Bopara 3/15 (4 overs)		LJ Wright 39 (29); HW Podmore 3/35 (4 overs)	St Lawrence Ground, Canterbury; Umpires: NL Bainton and RJ Warren; Player of the match: RS Bopara (Sussex)
Kent won the toss and chose to bat.; Points: Kent 0, Sussex 2				St Lawrence Ground, Canterbury; Umpires: NL Bainton and RJ Warren; Player of the match: RS Bopara (Sussex)

=== Play-offs ===
==== Quarter-final ====
27 August	Kent (H); 162/7 (20 overs)	v	Birmingham Bears; 141 (20 overs)	Kent won by 21 runs
Scorecard	Kent (H); 162/7 (20 overs)	v	Birmingham Bears; 141 (20 overs)	St Lawrence Ground, Canterbury; Umpires: M Burns and RJ Warren; Player of the match: SW Billings (Kent)
Scorecard	SW Billings 56 (37); TT Bresnan 4/26 (4 overs)		JB Lintott 41 (20); ME Milnes 4/24 (4 overs)	St Lawrence Ground, Canterbury; Umpires: M Burns and RJ Warren; Player of the match: SW Billings (Kent)
Birmingham Bears won the toss and chose to field.				St Lawrence Ground, Canterbury; Umpires: M Burns and RJ Warren; Player of the match: SW Billings (Kent)

==== Semi-final ====
18 September	Kent; 168/8 (20 overs)	v	Sussex; 147 (19.1 overs)	Kent won by 21 runs
Scorecard	Kent; 168/8 (20 overs)	v	Sussex; 147 (19.1 overs)	Edgbaston, Birmingham; Umpires: GD Lloyd and MJ Saggers; Player of the match: DJ Bell-Drummond (Kent)
Scorecard	DJ Bell-Drummond 82 (51); TS Mills 3/33 (4 overs)		GHS Garton 41 (23); FJ Klaassen 4/17 (3.1 overs)	Edgbaston, Birmingham; Umpires: GD Lloyd and MJ Saggers; Player of the match: DJ Bell-Drummond (Kent)
Kent won the toss and chose to bat.				Edgbaston, Birmingham; Umpires: GD Lloyd and MJ Saggers; Player of the match: DJ Bell-Drummond (Kent)

==== Final ====
18 September	Kent; 167/6 (20 overs)	v	Somerset; 142/9 (20 overs)	Kent won by 25 runs
Scorecard	Kent; 167/6 (20 overs)	v	Somerset; 142/9 (20 overs)	Edgbaston, Birmingham; Umpires: M Burns and MJ Saggers; Player of the match: JM Cox (Kent)
Scorecard	JM Cox 58* (28); RE van der Merwe 3/19 (4 overs)		WCF Smeed 43 (32); JL Denly 3/31 (4 overs)	Edgbaston, Birmingham; Umpires: M Burns and MJ Saggers; Player of the match: JM Cox (Kent)
Somerset won the toss and chose to field.				Edgbaston, Birmingham; Umpires: M Burns and MJ Saggers; Player of the match: JM Cox (Kent)
