= Kent County Cricket Club in 2020 =

2020 season of an English cricket team

Kent County Cricket Club
2020 season
- Coach: (England) Matthew Walker
- Captain: (England) Sam Billings
- Ground(s): St Lawrence Ground, Canterbury
- Bob Willis Trophy: 2nd, South Group
- Vitality Blast: Quarter-finals

In 2020 Kent County Cricket Club were scheduled to compete in Division One of the County Championship, the Royal London One-Day Cup and the 2020 t20 Blast. However, the season was heavily disrupted by the global COVID-19 pandemic, with no county cricket fixtures played until August. For the shortened season, the majority of counties voted on 7 July to play first-class and Twenty20 cricket, with the Royal London One-Day Cup being cancelled. Instead of the County Championship this year, the 18 first-class counties competed for the 2020 Bob Willis Trophy, which consisted of three regional groups of six teams and a final at Lord's.

The season was the fourth in charge for head coach, and former player, Matthew Walker. Former Kent bowler Simon Cook became the new bowling coach after a spell as head coach of the Hong Kong national team, replacing South African Allan Donald who left the county at the end of the previous season. Former England all-rounder Michael Yardy joined Kent as the new batting coach in February 2020. Sam Billings retained the club captaincy that he was first awarded in 2018. Billings and vice-captain Joe Denly both spent time away with England squads throughout the season, and so Daniel Bell-Drummond captained the team on several occasions.

The delayed start of the season and the resulting loss of income meant that, like many other counties, Kent decided to cancel contracts for their overseas signings. New Zealand fast bowler Matt Henry had been due to return for the first part of the season after a highly successful spell with the county in 2018. Meanwhile, Afghan all-rounder Mohammad Nabi had signed to play for the county in the t20 Blast for a second successive year.

== Squad ==
Batsman Alex Blake signed a new white-ball (limited overs) contract with the county in January 2020, becoming the first homegrown player to sign such a deal with Kent.

=== Departures ===
Mitchell Claydon left Kent after seven years with the team, to join Sussex at the end of the 2019 season. In July 2020, batsman Sean Dickson departed the club to join Durham, initially on loan for the 2020 season. On 30 July, wicket-keeper Adam Rouse announced his retirement from cricket at the age of 28, after having played four seasons with Kent.

All-rounder Calum Haggett and bowler Ivan Thomas were both released by the club after their contracts expired in October.

=== Arrivals ===
In August 2019, Kent announced that they had signed Yorkshire all-rounder Jack Leaning on a three-year contract from October 2019. In September 2019, Kent announced the signings of teenage Afghan-born England Under-19 off-spinner Hamidullah Qadri from Derbyshire on a three-year deal. A few days later, the county also announced the signing of 35 year-old seamer Tim Groenewald from Somerset on a two-year deal from 2020.

Zimbabwean-born 20-year old fast bowler Nathan Gilchrist, who had yet to play a senior match, joined Kent in August, initially on loan from Somerset ahead of signing a three-year contract.

=== Squad list ===
- Ages given as of the first day of the 2020 Bob Willis Trophy, 1 August 2020.

| No. | Name | Nationality | Birth date | Batting style | Bowling style | Notes |
Batsmen
| 4 | Heino Kuhn | South Africa | 1 April 1984 (aged 36) | Right-handed | — | Kolpak signing |
| 6 | Joe Denly | England | 16 March 1986 (aged 34) | Right-handed | Right arm leg break | Vice-captain |
| 10 | Alex Blake | England | 25 January 1989 (aged 31) | Left-handed | Right arm off break | White-ball contract only |
| 16 | Zak Crawley | England | 3 February 1998 (aged 22) | Right-handed | Right arm medium | |
| 23 | Daniel Bell-Drummond | England | 3 August 1993 (aged 26) | Right-handed | Right arm medium | |
| 34 | Jack Leaning | England | 18 October 1993 (aged 26) | Right-handed | Right arm medium/off break | |
All-rounders
| 3 | Darren Stevens | England | 30 April 1976 (aged 44) | Right-handed | Right arm medium | |
| 9 | Grant Stewart | Australia | 19 February 1994 (aged 26) | Right-handed | Right arm medium | EU passport holder |
| 25 | Calum Haggett | England | 30 October 1990 (aged 29) | Left-handed | Right arm medium-fast | |
| 55 | Marcus O'Riordan | England | 25 January 1998 (aged 22) | Right-handed | Right arm off break | |
Wicket-keepers
| 7 | Sam Billings | England | 15 June 1991 (aged 29) | Right-handed | — | Club captain |
| 21 | Ollie Robinson | England | 1 December 1998 (aged 21) | Right-handed | — | |
| 22 | Jordan Cox | England | 21 October 2000 (aged 19) | Right-handed | — | |
Bowlers
| 1 | Harry Podmore | England | 23 July 1994 (aged 26) | Right-handed | Right arm medium | |
| 5 | Ivan Thomas | England | 25 September 1991 (aged 28) | Right-handed | Right arm medium-fast | |
| 11 | Imran Qayyum | England | 23 May 1993 (aged 27) | Right-handed | Slow left-arm orthodox | |
| 17 | Nathan Gilchrist | South Africa | 11 June 2000 (aged 20) | Left-handed | Right-arm fast-medium | On loan from Somerset for 2020; UK passport |
| 18 | Fred Klaassen | Netherlands | 13 November 1992 (aged 27) | Right-handed | Left arm medium-fast | |
| 29 | Matt Milnes | England | 29 July 1994 (aged 26) | Right-handed | Right arm medium-fast | |
| 34 | Tim Groenewald | England | 10 January 1984 (aged 36) | Right-handed | Right arm fast-medium | |
| 75 | Hamidullah Qadri | England | 5 January 2000 (aged 20) | Right-handed | Right arm off break | |

== Bob Willis Trophy ==
Matches played in the 2020 Bob Willis Trophy had first-class status, but there were some differences to the playing conditions compared to the County Championship. The minimum number of overs in a day was reduced to 90, the follow-on increased from 150 runs to 200, the new ball was to be available after 90 overs instead of 80, and each team's first innings was restricted to a maximum of 120 overs. Kent's first match of the delayed season began on 1 August against Essex at Chelmsford.

=== South Group ===
| Team | Pld | W | L | T | D | A | Bat | Bowl | Ded | PCF | Pts |
|---|---|---|---|---|---|---|---|---|---|---|---|
| Essex (Q) | 5 | 4 | 0 | 0 | 1 | 0 | 6 | 12 | 0 | 0 | 90 |
| Kent (Note: Kent were deducted 1 point for a slow over rate against Surrey.) | 5 | 3 | 1 | 0 | 1 | 0 | 12 | 15 | 1 | 0 | 82 |
| Middlesex | 5 | 2 | 2 | 0 | 1 | 0 | 8 | 14 | 0 | 0 | 62 |
| Hampshire | 5 | 2 | 2 | 0 | 1 | 0 | 4 | 13 | 0 | 0 | 57 |
| Surrey | 5 | 1 | 4 | 0 | 0 | 0 | 8 | 12 | 0 | 0 | 36 |
| Sussex (Note: Sussex were deducted 24 points for ball tampering against Middlesex.) | 5 | 1 | 4 | 0 | 0 | 0 | 9 | 11 | 24 | 0 | 12 |

Source: BBC Sport, CricInfo, ECB
(Q) Qualified for Final

=== Matches ===
| 1–4 August | Kent | v | Essex (H) | Essex won by 2 wickets |
| Scorecard | 387 (104.3 overs); HG Kuhn 140 (248); JA Porter 4/107 (26 overs) | | 298 (108.2 overs); RN ten Doeschate 78 (170); ME Milnes 4/46 (20.2 overs) | County Ground, Chelmsford; Umpires: BJ Debenham and NL Bainton |
| Scorecard | 112 (49.1 overs); JM Cox 29 (116); SR Harmer 4/35 (18.1 overs) | | 202/8 (69.4 overs); AN Cook 66 (116); IAA Thomas 4/32 (8 overs) | County Ground, Chelmsford; Umpires: BJ Debenham and NL Bainton |
Kent won the toss and chose to bat; Points: Essex 21, Kent 7; JA Leaning and Hamidullah Qadri made their Kent debuts

| 8–10 August | Sussex | v | Kent (H) | Kent won by an innings and 25 runs |
| Scorecard | 332 (94.3 overs); BC Brown 98 (175); HW Podmore 4/85 (23.3 overs) | | 530/1 (120 overs); JM Cox 238* (345); ME Claydon 1/86 (24 overs) | St Lawrence Ground, Canterbury; Umpires: NJ Llong and M Newell |
| Scorecard | 173 (46.1 overs); HZ Finch 66 (98); DI Stevens 5/50 (15 overs) | | | St Lawrence Ground, Canterbury; Umpires: NJ Llong and M Newell |
Sussex won the toss and chose to bat; Points: Kent 24, Sussex 3; TD Groenewald made his Kent debut; JM Cox scored his maiden first-class century, and double century (238 not out), and JA Leaning also scored his maiden double century (220 not out); The unbeaten partnership of 423 runs between JM Cox and JA Leaning was a Kent record in first-class cricket; Kent's score of 530/1 was the fourth highest single wicket score in global first-class cricket

| 15–18 August | Middlesex | v | Kent (H) | Match drawn |
| Scorecard | 269 (108 overs); RG White 99 (220); DI Stevens 5/79 (31 overs) | | 191 (49 overs); JL Denly 89 (154); ML Cummins 5/62 (19.1 overs) | St Lawrence Ground, Canterbury; Umpires: NL Bainton and NJ Llong |
| Scorecard | 169/1d (40 overs); SD Robson 82* (143); MK O'Riordan 1/42 (8 overs) | | 70/0 (14 overs); MK O'Riordan 34* (41) | St Lawrence Ground, Canterbury; Umpires: NL Bainton and NJ Llong |
Kent won the toss and elected to field; Only 9.3 overs were bowled on day one, and only a further 52 overs on day two due to rain; Points: Kent 11, Middlesex 13

| 22–25 August | Kent | v | Surrey (H) | Kent won by 17 runs |
| Scorecard | 342 (103.1 overs); G Stewart 58 (103); AW Finch 4/69 (23.1 overs) | | 278 (91.4 overs); BT Foakes 118 (188); DI Stevens 3/45 (25 overs) | The Oval, London; Umpires: NL Bainton and NJ Llong |
| Scorecard | 127 (46.5 overs); JM Cox 32 (74); R Clarke 5/20 (14 overs) | | 174 (48.1 overs); BT Foakes 57 (131); DI Stevens 4/41 (13 overs) | The Oval, London; Umpires: NL Bainton and NJ Llong |
Surrey won the toss and chose to field; Points: Surrey 5, Kent 22; NN Gilchrist made his first-class debut; Kent were later deducted one point due to a slow over rate.

| 6–9 September | Hampshire | v | Kent (H) | Kent won by 7 wickets |
| Scorecard | 191 (75 overs); IG Holland 42 (69); DI Stevens 5/37 (27 overs) | | 170 (61 overs); MK O'Riordan 37 (82); SW Currie 3/42 (13 overs) | St Lawrence Ground, Canterbury; Umpires: NJ Llong and BV Taylor |
| Scorecard | 159 (64.1 overs); TAR Scriven 68 (132); HW Podmore 5/43 (23 overs) | | 185/3 (41.5 overs); Z Crawley 105 (100); AS Dale 1/22 (5 overs) | St Lawrence Ground, Canterbury; Umpires: NJ Llong and BV Taylor |
Kent won the toss and chose to field.; Points: Kent 19, Hampshire 3

== t20 Blast ==
=== South group ===
| Pos | Team | Pld | W | L | T | NR | Pts | NRR |
|---|---|---|---|---|---|---|---|---|
| 1 | Surrey | 10 | 7 | 1 | 1 | 1 | 16 | 0.651 |
| 2 | Sussex Sharks | 10 | 6 | 3 | 0 | 1 | 13 | 0.377 |
| 3 | Kent Spitfires | 10 | 5 | 3 | 1 | 1 | 12 | 0.108 |
| 4 | Middlesex | 10 | 3 | 5 | 1 | 1 | 8 | −0.296 |
| 5 | Essex Eagles | 10 | 2 | 6 | 1 | 1 | 6 | −0.003 |
| 6 | Hampshire | 10 | 2 | 7 | 0 | 1 | 5 | −0.803 |

Updated to match(es) played on 20 September 2020. Source: BBC Sport, England and Wales Cricket Board

=== Matches ===
| 27 August | Hampshire; 139/6 (20 overs) | v | Kent (H); 52/0 (4.1 overs) | No result |
| Scorecard | Hampshire; 139/6 (20 overs) | v | Kent (H); 52/0 (4.1 overs) | St Lawrence Ground, Canterbury; Umpires: NJ Llong and M Newell |
| Scorecard | JJ Weatherley 68 (49); ME Milnes 3/19 (4 overs) | | DJ Bell-Drummund 28* (16) | St Lawrence Ground, Canterbury; Umpires: NJ Llong and M Newell |
| Kent won the toss and chose to field; No further play was possible due to rain; Points: Kent 1, Hampshire 1 | | | | St Lawrence Ground, Canterbury; Umpires: NJ Llong and M Newell |

| 29 August | Middlesex (H); 209/4 (20 overs) | v | Kent; 209/5 (20 overs) | Match tied |
| Scorecard | Middlesex (H); 209/4 (20 overs) | v | Kent; 209/5 (20 overs) | Lord's, London; Umpires: NL Bainton and BJ Debenham; Player of the match: DJ Bell-Drummund (Kent) |
| Scorecard | SS Eskinazi 84 (52); FJ Klaassen 2/50 (4 overs) | | DJ Bell-Drummund 72 (32); ST Finn 2/34 (4 overs) | Lord's, London; Umpires: NL Bainton and BJ Debenham; Player of the match: DJ Bell-Drummund (Kent) |
| Kent won the toss and chose to field; Points: Middlesex 1, Kent 1 | | | | Lord's, London; Umpires: NL Bainton and BJ Debenham; Player of the match: DJ Bell-Drummund (Kent) |

| 1 September | Surrey; 161/4 (20 overs) | v | Kent (H); 162/5 (18.3 overs) | Kent won by 5 wickets |
| Scorecard | Surrey; 161/4 (20 overs) | v | Kent (H); 162/5 (18.3 overs) | St Lawrence Ground, Canterbury; Umpires: NJ Llong and M Newell; Player of the match: HG Kuhn (Kent) |
| Scorecard | HM Amla 75 (56); TD Groenewald 2/31 (4 overs) | | HG Kuhn 42* (31); D Moriarty 3/25 (4 overs) | St Lawrence Ground, Canterbury; Umpires: NJ Llong and M Newell; Player of the match: HG Kuhn (Kent) |
| Kent won the toss and chose to field; Points: Kent 2, Surrey 0 | | | | St Lawrence Ground, Canterbury; Umpires: NJ Llong and M Newell; Player of the match: HG Kuhn (Kent) |

| 3 September | Kent; 195/5 (20 overs) | v | Sussex (H); 194/7 (20 overs) | Kent won by 1 run |
| Scorecard | Kent; 195/5 (20 overs) | v | Sussex (H); 194/7 (20 overs) | County Cricket Ground, Hove; Umpires: M Newell and BV Taylor; Player of the match: Z Crawley (Kent) |
| Scorecard | Z Crawley 67 (49); GHS Garton 2/31 (4 overs) | | LJ Wright 40 (20); Imran Qayyum 2/27 (4 overs) | County Cricket Ground, Hove; Umpires: M Newell and BV Taylor; Player of the match: Z Crawley (Kent) |
| Sussex won the toss and chose to field; Points: Sussex 0, Kent 2 | | | | County Cricket Ground, Hove; Umpires: M Newell and BV Taylor; Player of the match: Z Crawley (Kent) |

| 5 September | Kent; 192/6 (20 overs) | v | Essex (H); 163/7 (20 overs) | Kent won by 29 runs |
| Scorecard | Kent; 192/6 (20 overs) | v | Essex (H); 163/7 (20 overs) | The Oval, London; Umpires: BJ Debenham and IJ Gould; Player of the match: DJ Bell-Drummond (Kent) |
| Scorecard | DJ Bell-Drummond 81 (45); SR Harmer 2/21 (4 overs) | | RN ten Doeschate 42 (24); Imran Qayyum 3/25 (4 overs) | The Oval, London; Umpires: BJ Debenham and IJ Gould; Player of the match: DJ Bell-Drummond (Kent) |
| Kent won the toss and chose to bat; Points: Kent 2, Essex 0 | | | | The Oval, London; Umpires: BJ Debenham and IJ Gould; Player of the match: DJ Bell-Drummond (Kent) |

| 12 September | Kent (H); 141/8 (20 overs) | v | Sussex; 145/2 (15.4 overs) | Sussex won by 8 wickets |
| Scorecard | Kent (H); 141/8 (20 overs) | v | Sussex; 145/2 (15.4 overs) | St Lawrence Ground, Canterbury; Umpires: IJ Gould and NJ Llong; Player of the match: DMW Rawlins (Sussex) |
| Scorecard | JL Denly 32 (17); DR Briggs 3/27 (4 overs) | | DMW Rawlins 62* (33); JL Denly 1/19 (3 overs) | St Lawrence Ground, Canterbury; Umpires: IJ Gould and NJ Llong; Player of the match: DMW Rawlins (Sussex) |
| Sussex win the toss and chose to field; Points: Kent 0, Sussex 2 | | | | St Lawrence Ground, Canterbury; Umpires: IJ Gould and NJ Llong; Player of the match: DMW Rawlins (Sussex) |

| 14 September | Hampshire (H); 182/6 (20 overs) | v | Kent; 183/2 (17.1 overs) | Kent won by 8 wickets |
| Scorecard | Hampshire (H); 182/6 (20 overs) | v | Kent; 183/2 (17.1 overs) | Ageas Bowl, Southampton; Umpires: M Newell and BV Taylor; Player of the match: Z Crawley (Kent) |
| Scorecard | James Fuller 50* (23); FJ Klaassen 1/24 (3 overs) | | Z Crawley 108* (54); IG Holland 1/27 (2.1 overs) | Ageas Bowl, Southampton; Umpires: M Newell and BV Taylor; Player of the match: Z Crawley (Kent) |
| Kent won the toss and chose to field.; Points: Hampshire 0, Kent 2; Z Crawley scored his first Twenty20 century | | | | Ageas Bowl, Southampton; Umpires: M Newell and BV Taylor; Player of the match: Z Crawley (Kent) |

| 16 September | Middlesex; 184/6 (20 overs) | v | Kent (H); 182/7 (20 overs) | Middlesex won by 2 runs |
| Scorecard | Middlesex; 184/6 (20 overs) | v | Kent (H); 182/7 (20 overs) | St Lawrence Ground, Canterbury; Umpires: NL Bainton and NJ Llong; Player of the match: LBK Hollman (Middlesex) |
| Scorecard | JB Cracknell 50 (22); Imran Qayyum 1/21 (4 overs) | | DJ Bell-Drummond 89 (54); TJ Murtagh 2/23 (4 overs) | St Lawrence Ground, Canterbury; Umpires: NL Bainton and NJ Llong; Player of the match: LBK Hollman (Middlesex) |
| Kent won the toss and chose to field; Points: Kent 0, Middlesex 2 | | | | St Lawrence Ground, Canterbury; Umpires: NL Bainton and NJ Llong; Player of the match: LBK Hollman (Middlesex) |

| 18 September | Essex; 167/9 (20 overs) | v | Kent (H); 171/6 (19.4 overs) | Kent won by 4 wickets |
| Scorecard | Essex; 167/9 (20 overs) | v | Kent (H); 171/6 (19.4 overs) | St Lawrence Ground, Canterbury; Umpires: NJ Llong and MJ Saggers; Player of the match: JA Leaning (Kent) |
| Scorecard | RN ten Doeschate 52 (33); FJ Klaassen 3/36 (4 overs) | | JA Leaning 55* (32); JH Plom 3/32 (3.4 overs) | St Lawrence Ground, Canterbury; Umpires: NJ Llong and MJ Saggers; Player of the match: JA Leaning (Kent) |
| Essex won the toss and chose to bat; Points: Kent 2, Essex 0 | | | | St Lawrence Ground, Canterbury; Umpires: NJ Llong and MJ Saggers; Player of the match: JA Leaning (Kent) |

| 20 September | Kent; 159/8 (20 overs) | v | Surrey (H); 161/4 (18.4 overs) | Surrey won by 6 wickets |
| Scorecard | Kent; 159/8 (20 overs) | v | Surrey (H); 161/4 (18.4 overs) | The Oval, London; Umpires: IJ Gould and NJ Llong; Player of the match: LJ Evans (Surrey) |
| Scorecard | SW Billings 50 (33); LE Plunkett 3/19 (4 overs) | | LJ Evans 73 (45); G Stewart 2/28 (3.4 overs) | The Oval, London; Umpires: IJ Gould and NJ Llong; Player of the match: LJ Evans (Surrey) |
| Surrey won the toss and chose to field; Points: Surrey 2, Kent 0 | | | | The Oval, London; Umpires: IJ Gould and NJ Llong; Player of the match: LJ Evans (Surrey) |

==== Quarter-final ====
| 1 October | Surrey (H); 169/2 (20 overs) | v | Kent; 113/7 (20 overs) | Surrey won by 56 runs |
| Scorecard | Surrey (H); 169/2 (20 overs) | v | Kent; 113/7 (20 overs) | The Oval, London; Umpires: NGB Cook and MJ Saggers; Player of the match: WG Jacks (Surrey) |
| Scorecard | HM Amla 73* (53); Imran Qayyum 2/34 (4 overs) | | JA Leaning 34 (28); WG Jacks 4/15 (4 overs) | The Oval, London; Umpires: NGB Cook and MJ Saggers; Player of the match: WG Jacks (Surrey) |
| Kent won the toss and chose to bat | | | | The Oval, London; Umpires: NGB Cook and MJ Saggers; Player of the match: WG Jacks (Surrey) |
