= Kent County Cricket Club in 2019 =

2019 season of an English cricket team

Kent County Cricket Club
2019 season
- Coach: (England) Matthew Walker
- Captain: (England) Sam Billings
- Overseas players: (Australia) Matt Renshaw (South Africa) Wiaan Mulder (New Zealand) Adam Milne (T20 only) (Afghanistan) Mohammad Nabi (T20 only) (South Africa) Faf du Plessis
- Ground(s): St Lawrence Ground, Canterbury; Nevill Ground, Tunbridge Wells; County Ground, Beckenham
- County Championship: 4th, Division One
- Royal London One-Day Cup: 7th, South Group
- Vitality Blast: 5th, South Group

In 2019 Kent County Cricket Club competed in Division One of the County Championship after gaining promotion in the 2018 season, the Royal London One-Day Cup and the 2019 t20 Blast.

The season was the third in charge for head coach, and former player, Matthew Walker. Sam Billings retained the club captaincy that he was first awarded in 2018. With Billings and vice-captain Joe Denly playing in the Indian Premier League, which ran until 5 May, Heino Kuhn was announced as interim captain for the early part of the season. Following an injury to Billings in April, Denly and Kuhn captained the team during the first half of the season, with Kuhn standing in as captain in June and July to allow Denly to focus on his batting following a period of poor form.

== Squad ==
=== Departures ===
At the end of the 2018 season, and after an 18-year career with Kent, former England off-spinner James Tredwell announced his retirement from cricket. Tredwell represented England in two Tests, 45 One Day Internationals and 17 T20 Internationals. Will Gidman and Matt Hunn also retired from professional cricket when their contracts expired.

Spin bowler Adam Riley left the club by "mutual consent" in June, having played four matches during the season. Riley had joined the club in 2011 and made over 100 appearances for Kent. Veteran all-rounder Darren Stevens was loaned out to Derbyshire for the T20 Blast competition in July. Stevens, who had not played for Kent in the 2018 Blast, was not part of the county's plans for the competition but wanted to play T20 cricket during the season with an eye to maintaining his fitness if required by Kent.

In July, it was reported that 43 year-old all-rounder Darren Stevens would not be offered a new contract after the 2019 season. However, after a string of strong performances featuring a sequence of 445 runs and 34 wickets in five championship matches, including a ten-wicket match haul against Nottinghamshire and a career high score of 237 against Yorkshire, the club made a u-turn and Stevens signed an extension.

In September, the club announced that seamer Mitchell Claydon would be leaving after seven years at the end of the season to join Sussex.

=== Arrivals ===
In September 2018, Kent announced the signing of 24 year-old seam bowler Matt Milnes from Nottinghamshire on a three-year deal beginning at the start of the 2019 season. Milnes had played only eight first-class matches, making his Nottinghamshire debut in June, and previously having played for Durham MCCU. On 1 October 2018, Kent announced another signing for the 2019 season with Dutch international left-arm fast bowler Fred Klaassen joining on a two-year contract. In October, Kent awarded a first professional contract to academy graduate wicketkeeper-batsman Jordan Cox.

In February, Kent announced the signing of English-born Australian international batsman Matt Renshaw as their overseas player for the early part of the season, making him available for the opening three County Championship matches and the entire Royal London One-Day Cup campaign. New Zealand fast bowler Adam Milne re-signed to play for the county in the T20 Blast later the same month and Afghanistan's veteran all-rounder Mohammad Nabi was also signed for the first 11 matches of the competition.

In May, Kent announced that Wiaan Mulder had signed with the county as the overseas player for seven County Championship matches. The South African all-rounder replaced Matt Renshaw after his stint ended in the middle of May, although he was only able to play in three matches before being recalled by South Africa to rest a foot injury ahead of their tour of India. On 5 June, Kent announced that South African fast bowler Hardus Viljoen was to rejoin the club for a second spell to play in the T20 Blast. Viljoen previously had a short spell with Kent at the end of the 2016 season and rejoins as a Kolpak signing. On 7 June, Middlesex off-spinner Ollie Rayner joined the county on loan for the last eight County Championship matches of the season and on 6 August Academy graduate Marcus O'Riordan signed his first professional contract, initially for the remainder of the season. On 25 August, Kent announced the signing of South Africa captain Faf du Plessis for their remaining two group matches of the T20 Blast, replacing the departed Mohammad Nabi. It was later announced that du Plessis would also play in the County Championship match against Yorkshire at Headingley, providing him with some first-class preparation prior to captaining South Africa in their Test series against India.

Also in August, Kent announced that they had signed Yorkshire all-rounder Jack Leaning on a three-year contract from October 2019. During their last game of the season, Kent announced the signing of teenage Afghan-born England Under-19 off-spinner Hamidullah Qadri on a three-year deal from the 2020 season. Shortly after the same match, Kent announced the signing of 35 year-old seamer Tim Groenewald from Somerset on a two-year deal from 2020.

=== Squad list ===
- Ages given as of the first day of the 2019 County Championship season, 5 April 2019.

No.	Name	Nationality	Birth date	Batting style	Bowling style	Notes
Batsmen
4	Heino Kuhn	South Africa	1 April 1984 (aged 35)	Right-handed	—	Kolpak signing
6	Joe Denly	England	16 March 1986 (aged 33)	Right-handed	Right arm leg break	Vice-captain
13	Faf du Plessis	South Africa	13 July 1984 (aged 34)	Right-handed	Right-arm leg-break	Overseas player (August–September)
10	Alex Blake	England	25 January 1989 (aged 30)	Left-handed	Right arm medium-fast	
16	Zak Crawley	England	3 February 1998 (aged 21)	Right-handed	Right arm medium	
23	Daniel Bell-Drummond	England	3 August 1993 (aged 25)	Right-handed	Right arm medium	
58	Sean Dickson	South Africa	2 September 1991 (aged 27)	Right-handed	Right arm medium	British passport holder
77	Matt Renshaw	Australia	28 March 1996 (aged 23)	Left-handed	Right arm off break	Overseas player (April–May)
All-rounders
3	Darren Stevens	England	30 April 1976 (aged 42)	Right-handed	Right arm medium	On loan at Derbyshire for T20 matches
9	Grant Stewart	Australia	19 February 1994 (aged 25)	Right-handed	Right arm medium	EU passport holder
14	Wiaan Mulder	South Africa	19 February 1998 (aged 21)	Right-handed	Right arm medium	Overseas player (May–July)
25	Calum Haggett	England	30 October 1990 (aged 28)	Left-handed	Right arm medium-fast	
55	Marcus O'Riordan	England	25 January 1998 (aged 21)	Right-handed	Right arm off break	Signed a professional contract on 6 August
77	Mohammad Nabi	Afghanistan	1 January 1985 (aged 34)	Right-handed	Right arm off break	Overseas player; T20 Blast only
Wicket-keepers
7	Sam Billings	England	15 June 1991 (aged 27)	Right-handed	—	Club captain
12	Adam Rouse	England	30 June 1992 (aged 26)	Right-handed	—	
21	Ollie Robinson	England	1 December 1998 (aged 20)	Right-handed	—	
22	Jordan Cox	England	21 October 2000 (aged 18)	Right-handed	—	
Bowlers
1	Harry Podmore	England	23 July 1994 (aged 24)	Right-handed	Right arm medium	
2	Ollie Rayner	Germany	1 November 1985 (age 40)	Right-handed	Right arm off break	On loan from Middlesex
5	Ivan Thomas	England	25 September 1991 (aged 27)	Right-handed	Right arm medium-fast	
8	Mitchell Claydon	England	25 November 1982 (aged 36)	Left-handed	Right arm medium-fast	
11	Imran Qayyum	England	23 May 1993 (aged 25)	Right-handed	Slow left-arm orthodox	
17	Hardus Viljoen	South Africa	6 March 1989 (aged 30)	Right-handed	Right arm fast	Kolpak signing, T20 Blast only
18	Fred Klaassen	Netherlands	13 November 1992 (aged 26)	Right-handed	Left arm medium-fast	
20	Adam Milne	New Zealand	13 April 1992 (aged 26)	Right-handed	Right arm fast	Overseas player; T20 Blast only
29	Matt Milnes	England	29 July 1994 (aged 24)	Right-handed	Right arm medium-fast	
33	Adam Riley	England	23 March 1992 (aged 27)	Right-handed	Right arm off break	Left the club by mutual consent in June

== County Championship ==
The season is Kent's first in Division One of the County Championship since 2010. They will play 14 matches, playing each of the seven other teams in the division twice, once at home and once away. Five of the county's home matches will be staged at the St Lawrence Ground, with one match at each of the Nevill Ground in Tunbridge Wells and County Cricket Ground, Beckenham.

Kent's first match of the season began on 5 April against Somerset at Taunton, although the whole of the first day was lost to rain and a wet outfield.

=== Division One ===
Team	Pld	W	L	T	D	A	Bat	Bowl	Ded	Pts
Essex (C)	14	9	1	0	4	0	26	38	0	228
Somerset	14	9	3	0	2	0	25	38	0	217
Hampshire	14	5	3	0	6	0	31	36	1	176
Kent	14	5	5	0	4	0	36	36	0	172
Yorkshire	14	5	4	0	5	0	24	36	0	165
Surrey	14	2	6	0	6	0	33	38	0	133
Warwickshire	14	3	6	0	5	0	26	32	0	131
Nottinghamshire (R)	14	0	10	0	4	0	16	32	1	67

Sources: ESPNcricinfo, ECB

- Essex were County Champions.
- Nottinghamshire were relegated to Division Two.
- Nottinghamshire were deducted one point for a slow over rate against Somerset in April.
- Hampshire were deducted one point for a slow over rate against Essex in June.

=== Matches ===
5–8 April	Somerset (H)	v	Kent	Somerset won by 74 runs
Scorecard	171 (48 overs); TB Abell 49 (80); ME Claydon 5/46 (12 overs)		209 (73.5 overs); SR Dickson 43 (107); L Gregory 3/26 (17 overs)	County Ground, Taunton; Umpires: RJ Bailey and RK Illingworth
Scorecard	243 (71.3 overs); GA Bartlett 63 (110); ME Claydon 4/66 (18 overs)		131 (46 overs); DI Stevens 43* (82); L Gregory 5/18 (13 overs)	County Ground, Taunton; Umpires: RJ Bailey and RK Illingworth
Uncontested toss; Kent chose to field; No play on day one or before lunch on day 2 due to a wet outfield.; Points: Somerset 19, Kent 4; MT Renshaw made his Kent debut; ME Claydon took his best match bowling figures with 9/112

11–14 April	Kent	v	Warwickshire (H)	Kent won by 8 wickets
Scorecard	504/9d (136.5 overs); OG Robinson 143 (228); JS Patel 3/113 (35.5 overs)		346 (120 overs); DP Sibley 132 (315); ME Milnes 3/50 (22 overs)	Edgbaston, Birmingham; Umpires: RK Illingworth and NA Mallender
Scorecard	124/2 (19.4 overs); MT Renshaw 48* (50); JS Patel 1/25 (5 overs)		280 (93.1 overs) (f/o); TR Ambrose 107 (195); HW Podmore 5/62 (29 overs)	Edgbaston, Birmingham; Umpires: RK Illingworth and NA Mallender
Kent won the toss and elected to bat; Points: Warwickshire 4, Kent 24; OG Robinson scored his maiden first-class century in Kent's first innings scoring 143 runs; Z Crawley scored his second first-class century in Kent's first innings, scoring 108

14–17 May	Yorkshire	v	Kent (H)	Yorkshire won by 172 runs
Scorecard	210 (56.2 overs); HC Brook 29 (26); ME Milnes 3/63 (16 overs)		296 (87 overs); OG Robinson 103 (181); BO Coad 3/66 (21 overs)	St Lawrence Ground, Canterbury; Umpires: M Burns and PR Pollard
Scorecard	469 (131.1 overs); GS Ballance 159 (291); ME Claydon 3/83 (27 overs)		211 (88.5 overs); DJ Bell-Drummond 41 (121); BO Coad 6/52 (24.5 overs)	St Lawrence Ground, Canterbury; Umpires: M Burns and PR Pollard
Yorkshire won the toss and elected to bat; Points: Kent 5, Yorkshire 20; FJ Klaassen took his first wickets in first-class cricket during the match, with best figures of 1/44

20–23 May	Surrey	v	Kent (H)	Match drawn
Scorecard	439 (98.1 overs); WG Jacks 120 (194); PWA Mulder 4/118 (22 overs)		294 (85.5 overs); SR Dickson 128 (237); GJ Batty 3/49 (12 overs)	County Ground, Beckenham; Umpires: GD Lloyd and AG Wharf
Scorecard	280 (79.5 overs); SM Curran 80 (119); ME Milnes 4/74 (17.5 overs)		352/8 (113 overs); SR Dickson 91 (178); R Clarke 3/67 (25 overs)	County Ground, Beckenham; Umpires: GD Lloyd and AG Wharf
Surrey won the toss and chose to bat; Points: Kent 10, Surrey 13; PWA Mulder made his Kent debut

27–30 May	Essex (H)	v	Kent	Essex won by 113 runs
Scorecard	313 (101.2 overs); AN Cook 125 (242 balls); ME Milnes 4/61 (21.2 overs)		182 (88.2 overs); DJ Bell-Drummond 28 (82); PM Siddle 3/29 (17 overs)	County Ground, Chelmsford; Umpires: RT Robinson and M Burns
Scorecard	206/7d (63 overs); AN Cook 90 (160); ME Milnes 2/47 (12 overs)		224 (73.5 overs); DJ Bell-Drummond 81 (176); SR Harmer 8/98 (32.5 overs)	County Ground, Chelmsford; Umpires: RT Robinson and M Burns
Uncontested toss; Kent chose to field; Points: Essex 22, Kent 3

10–13 June	Kent (H)	v	Somerset	Somerset won by 10 wickets
Scorecard	139 (41 overs); OG Robinson 37 (61); L Gregory 6/32 (13.1 overs)		169 (46.2 overs); T Banton 63 (119); G Stewart 3/37 (12 overs)	St Lawrence Ground, Canterbury; Umpires: BV Taylor and MJ Saggers
Scorecard	59 (26.1 overs); SR Dickson 22 (55); L Gregory 5/21 (13.1 overs)		30/0 (6.4 overs); TB Abell 15* (20)	St Lawrence Ground, Canterbury; Umpires: BV Taylor and MJ Saggers
Uncontested toss; Somerset chose to field; No play was possible on days one or three, or before lunch on day four, due to rain and a wet outfield; Points: Kent 3, Somerset 19

17–20 June	Kent (H)	v	Nottinghamshire	Kent won by 285 runs
Scorecard	309 (83.1 overs); Z Crawley 111 (173); JL Pattinson 6/73 (21 overs)		267 (102.5 overs); CD Nash 67 (168); ME Milnes 5/68 (23 overs)	Nevill Ground, Royal Tunbridge Wells; Umpires: NA Mallender and SJ O'Shaughnessy
Scorecard	363/5d (76 overs); JL Denly 161* (204); JL Pattinson 2/67 (17 overs)		120 (60.1 overs); BM Duckett 23 (17); HW Podmore 5/41 (16 overs)	Nevill Ground, Royal Tunbridge Wells; Umpires: NA Mallender and SJ O'Shaughnessy
Uncontested toss; Nottinghamshire chose to field; Points: Kent 22, Nottinghamshire 5; OP Rayner made his Kent debut

30 June – 3 July	Kent (H)	v	Warwickshire	Match drawn
Scorecard	585/7d (144.1 overs); DJ Bell-Drummond 166 (256); JC Wainman 3/112 (23 overs)		574/7d (218 overs); DP Sibley 244 (491); G Stewart 2/120 (23 overs)	St Lawrence Ground, Canterbury; Umpires: NGB Cook and BJ Debenham
Kent won the toss and chose to bat; Points: Kent 10, Warwickshire 9

7–10 July	Surrey (H)	v	Kent	Kent won by 5 wickets
Scorecard	271 (84.5 overs); D Elgar 63 (149); HW Podmore 3/42 (19 overs)		369 (107.3 overs); JL Denly 88 (200); SM Curran 3/56 (25 overs)	The Oval, London; Umpires: SJ O'Shaughnessy and BV Taylor
Scorecard	218 (77.1 overs); D Elgar 65 (132); DI Stevens 5/60 (22 overs)		124/5 (30.4 overs); OG Robinson 51* (41); M Morkel 2/22 (8 overs)	The Oval, London; Umpires: SJ O'Shaughnessy and BV Taylor
Uncontested toss; Kent chose to field; Points: Surrey 5, Kent 23

13–16 July	Hampshire (H)	v	Kent	Match drawn
Scorecard	409/9d (115 overs); FS Organ 100 (235); DI Stevens 5/68 (25 overs)		555 (131.1 overs); JL Denly 154 (229); FH Edwards 5/118 (27 overs)	AGEAS Bowl, Southampton; Umpires: GD Lloyd and JW Lloyds
Scorecard	298 (115.4 overs); IG Holland 69 (200); JL Denly 3/48 (25 overs)		57/3 (8.2 overs); JL Denly 29* (22); FH Edwards 1/7 (1 over)	AGEAS Bowl, Southampton; Umpires: GD Lloyd and JW Lloyds
Hampshire won the toss and chose to bat; Points: Hampshire 11, Kent 12; JM Cox made his first-class debut; AJ Blake replaced HG Kuhn as a concussion substitute after 70 overs of Hampshire's second innings during day 4.

18–21 August	Kent (H)	v	Essex	Essex won by 3 wickets
Scorecard	226 (80.4 overs); DJ Bell-Drummond 55 (126); SJ Cook 5/42 (18.4 overs)		114; Mohammad Amir 28 (39); HW Podmore 4/34 (18 overs)	St Lawrence Ground, Canterbury; Umpires: ID Blackwell and PK Baldwin
Scorecard	40 (18.1 overs); OE Rayner 9 (21); ME Milnes 9 (21); SJ Cook 7/23 (9 overs)		153/7 (42.1 overs); AJA Wheater 30* (65); ME Claydon 3/21 (7 overs)	St Lawrence Ground, Canterbury; Umpires: ID Blackwell and PK Baldwin
No toss, Essex chose to field; Points: Kent 4, Essex 19

10–12 September	Kent	v	Nottinghamshire (H)	Kent won by 227 runs
Scorecard	304 (81.4 overs); DI Stevens 88 (90); R Ashwin 4/121 (32 overs)		124 (53.1 overs); SJ Mullaney 22 (52); DI Stevens 5/39 (17.1 overs)	Trent Bridge, Nottingham; Umpires: PJ Hartley and GD Lloyd
Scorecard	259 (56.5 overs); SW Billings 100 (106); R Ashwin 5/89 (18.5 overs)		212 (51.2 overs); R Ashwin 55 (91); DI Stevens 5/53 (18.2 overs)	Trent Bridge, Nottingham; Umpires: PJ Hartley and GD Lloyd
Kent won the toss and chose to bat; Points: Nottinghamshire 3, Kent 22; MK O'Riordan made his first-class debut

16–19 September	Kent	v	Yorkshire (H)	Kent won by 433 runs
Scorecard	482/8d (96 overs); DI Stevens 237 (225); D Olivier 5/108 (24 overs)		269 (92 overs); MD Fisher 47 (150); ME Milnes 5/87 (21 overs)	Headingley, Leeds; Umpires: MA Gough and DJ Millns
Scorecard	337/7 (74 overs); SW Billings 122* (156); MD Fisher 2/38 (12 overs)		117 (55.2 overs); JA Tattersall 41 (95); DI Stevens 5/20 (18 overs)	Headingley, Leeds; Umpires: MA Gough and DJ Millns
Kent won the toss and chose to bat; Points: Yorkshire 4, Kent 24; DI Stevens' score of 237 was his highest score in first-class cricket; The sixth wicket partnership of 346 runs between Stevens and SW Billings set a new record partnership for the sixth wicket for Kent in first-class cricket and a new sixth wicket record for any team at Headingley. It set the fifth highest partnership for Kent for any wicket; Billings scored a century in both of Kent's innings, becoming the first player to do so in a County Championship match at Headingley

23–26 September	Kent (H)	v	Hampshire	Match drawn
Scorecard	147 (43.5 overs); OP Rayner 39 (40); KHD Barker 5/48 (17 overs)		80/3 (21 overs); TP Alsop 40 (49); DI Stevens 2/27 (10 overs)	St Lawrence Ground, Canterbury; Umpires: BJ Debenham and IJ Gould
No toss, Hampshire chose to field; Play was only possible on day one of the match due to rain and a wet outfield; Points: Kent 6, Hampshire 8

== Other first-class match ==
Kent began the season with a three-day first-class match against Loughborough MCC University on 31 March as part of the 2019 Marylebone Cricket Club University Matches. With Joe Denly and Sam Billings away at the IPL and interim captain Heino Kuhn not in the team, Daniel Bell-Drummond stood in as captain for this match. Fred Klaassen and Matt Milnes made their Kent debuts in the match which was drawn after much of the final day was lost to rain. Sean Dickson scored Kent's first century of the season, with a score of 108 not out in the county's first innings.

31 March – 2 April	Kent (H)	v	Loughborough MCC University	Match drawn
Scorecard	247/8d (73 overs); SR Dickson 108* (207); HA Evans 3/49 (19 overs)		248/9d (93.4 overs); LPJ Kimber 62 (176); ME Milnes 3/95 (21.4 overs)	St Lawrence Ground, Canterbury; Umpires: MJ Saggers and CM Watts
Scorecard	149/1 (44.3 overs); Z Crawley 87 (127); LPJ Kimber 1/34 (8.3 overs)			St Lawrence Ground, Canterbury; Umpires: MJ Saggers and CM Watts
Loughborough MCCU won the toss and chose to field; No play was possible after lunch on day three due to rain; FJ Klaassen and ME Milnes made their Kent debuts. The match was Klaassen's first-class debut.; DJ Bell-Drummond recorded his best first-class bowling figures in Loughborough's first innings (2/6)

== Royal London One-Day Cup ==
Kent played eight matches in the South Group in the 2019 Royal London One-Day Cup, winning only two matches in a competition that they had reached the final of in 2018. Four losses and an abandoned match at Cardiff to start the competition effectively knocked the county out of the knock-out stages before two wins against Surrey and Essex led to a seventh-place finish in the group.

The campaign saw maiden List A centuries for Matt Renshaw and Zak Crawley as well as a century for Daniel Bell-Drummond whilst bowler Matt Milnes took his first professional five wicket haul in Kent's first match of the competition, his List A debut. In April former England and Warwickshire batsman Jonathan Trott was announced as an additional coach for Kent's campaign.

=== South group ===
Pos	Team	Pld	W	L	T	NR	Ded	Pts	NRR
1	Hampshire (Note: advanced directly to the semi-finals)	8	7	1	0	0	0	14	1.020
2	Middlesex (Note: advanced to the quarter-finals)	8	6	2	0	0	0	12	0.135
3	Somerset	8	5	3	0	0	0	10	0.505
4	Gloucestershire	8	5	3	0	0	0	10	0.270
5	Sussex	8	4	4	0	0	0	8	0.013
6	Glamorgan	8	3	4	0	1	0	7	−0.298
7	Kent	8	2	5	0	1	0	5	−0.966
8	Essex	8	2	6	0	0	0	4	0.325
9	Surrey	8	1	7	0	0	0	2	−1.007

Source: BBC Sport, CricInfo

=== Matches ===
17 April	Hampshire; 310/9 (50 overs)	v	Kent (H); 220 (40 overs)	Hampshire won by 90 runs
Scorecard	Hampshire; 310/9 (50 overs)	v	Kent (H); 220 (40 overs)	St Lawrence Ground, Canterbury; Umpires: NL Bainton and DJ Millns; Player of the match: SA Northeast (Hampshire)
Scorecard	SA Northeast 105* (95); ME Milnes 5/79 (10 overs)		Z Crawley 49 (51); LA Dawson 2/30 (9 overs)	St Lawrence Ground, Canterbury; Umpires: NL Bainton and DJ Millns; Player of the match: SA Northeast (Hampshire)
Kent won the toss and chose to field; Points: Kent 0, Hampshire 2; ME Milnes made his List A cricket debut, recording a five wicket haul				St Lawrence Ground, Canterbury; Umpires: NL Bainton and DJ Millns; Player of the match: SA Northeast (Hampshire)

19 April	Somerset (H); 358/9 (50 overs)	v	Kent; 94 (27 overs)	Somerset won by 264 runs
Scoreboard	Somerset (H); 358/9 (50 overs)	v	Kent; 94 (27 overs)	County Ground, Taunton; Umpires: BV Taylor and AG Wharf
Scoreboard	T Banton 107 (79); DI Stevens 2/50 (10 overs)		AJ Blake 24 (33); C Overton 5/18 (7 overs)	County Ground, Taunton; Umpires: BV Taylor and AG Wharf
Kent won the toss and chose to field; Points: Somerset 2, Kent 0				County Ground, Taunton; Umpires: BV Taylor and AG Wharf

21 April	Kent (H); 298 (50 overs)	v	Sussex; 302/3 (40 overs)	Sussex won by 3 wickets (with 60 balls remaining)
Scorecard	Kent (H); 298 (50 overs)	v	Sussex; 302/3 (40 overs)	County Ground, Beckenham; Umpires: RJ Bailey and BJ Debenham
Scorecard	MT Renshaw 109 (111); GHS Garton 3/42 (8 overs)		PD Salt 137* (106); ME Milnes 2/73 (9 overs)	County Ground, Beckenham; Umpires: RJ Bailey and BJ Debenham
Kent won the toss and chose to bat; Points: Kent 0, Sussex 2; PD Salt's score of 137 not out set a new record for the highest score in List A cricket on the ground				County Ground, Beckenham; Umpires: RJ Bailey and BJ Debenham

23 April	Kent; 282/8 (50 overs)	v	Gloucestershire (H); 283/4 (46.5 overs)	Gloucestershire won by 19 runs (with 19 balls remaining)
Scorecard	Kent; 282/8 (50 overs)	v	Gloucestershire (H); 283/4 (46.5 overs)	County Ground, Bristol; Umpires: ID Blackwell and GD Lloyd
Scorecard	Z Crawley 85 (110); BAC Howell 2/39 (10 overs)		GH Roderick 100* (80); AJ Blake 1/32 (6 overs)	County Ground, Bristol; Umpires: ID Blackwell and GD Lloyd
Gloucestershire won the toss and chose to field; Points: Gloucestershire 2, Kent 0				County Ground, Bristol; Umpires: ID Blackwell and GD Lloyd

25 April	Glamorgan (H); 68/2 (15 overs)	v	Kent	No result
Scorecard	Glamorgan (H); 68/2 (15 overs)	v	Kent	Sophia Gardens, Cardiff; Umpires: M Burns and PR Pollard
Scorecard	CB Cooke 29 (28); FJ Klaassen 1/9 (2 overs)			Sophia Gardens, Cardiff; Umpires: M Burns and PR Pollard
Glamorgan won the toss and chose to bat; Match reduced to 40 overs per side due to rain; Points: Glamorgan 1, Kent 1				Sophia Gardens, Cardiff; Umpires: M Burns and PR Pollard

2 May	Surrey (H); 127 (35.2 overs)	v	Kent; 131/2 (28 overs)	Kent won by 8 wickets (with 132 balls remaining)
Scorecard	Surrey (H); 127 (35.2 overs)	v	Kent; 131/2 (28 overs)	The Oval, London; Umpires: RA Kettleborough and BV Taylor
Scorecard	D Elgar 62* (94 balls); ME Milnes 3/37 (8 overs)		DJ Bell-Drummond 41 (62 balls); M Morkel 1/20 (7 overs)	The Oval, London; Umpires: RA Kettleborough and BV Taylor
Surrey won the toss and chose to bat; Points: Surrey 0, Kent 2; DJ Bell-Drummond and MT Renshaw took their first List A wickets in the match and set best List A bowling figures of 2/22 and 2/17, respectively				The Oval, London; Umpires: RA Kettleborough and BV Taylor

5 May	Essex; 271/9 (50 overs)	v	Kent (H); 272/4 (46.4 overs)	Kent won by 6 wickets (with 20 balls remaining)
Scorecard	Essex; 271/9 (50 overs)	v	Kent (H); 272/4 (46.4 overs)	County Ground, Beckenham; Umpires: MJ Saggers and R Warren
Scorecard	T Westley 58 (66); ME Milnes 3/60 (10 overs)		DJ Bell-Drummond 120* (123); MT Coles 2/63 (8 overs)	County Ground, Beckenham; Umpires: MJ Saggers and R Warren
Kent won the toss and chose to field; Points: Kent 2, Essex 0; Kent's first-wicket partnership of 188 runs between DJ Bell-Drummond and Z Crawley set a new record for any wicket partnership on the ground and a record for the highest first-wicket partnership for Kent against Essex in List A cricket				County Ground, Beckenham; Umpires: MJ Saggers and R Warren

7 May	Middlesex; 380/5 (50 overs)	v	Kent (H); 347 (48.5 overs)	Middlesex won by 33 runs
Scorecard	Middlesex; 380/5 (50 overs)	v	Kent (H); 347 (48.5 overs)	St Lawrence Ground, Canterbury; Umpires: SJ O'Shaughnessy and PR Pollard
Scorecard	MDE Holden 166 (139); DJ Bell-Drummond 1/45 (7 overs)		Z Crawley 120 (123); JAR Harris 4/65 (10 overs)	St Lawrence Ground, Canterbury; Umpires: SJ O'Shaughnessy and PR Pollard
Middlesex won the toss and chose to bat; Points: Kent 0, Middlesex 2; Z Crawley scored his first List A century				St Lawrence Ground, Canterbury; Umpires: SJ O'Shaughnessy and PR Pollard

== Other List A match ==
Kent hosted a 50-over match against the touring Pakistan national team ahead of their One Day International series against England. Due to a number of injuries and other availability issues affecting a significant number of players, Kent were given permission by the ECB to include two guest players for this fixture. Middlesex seamer James Harris (who had previously had a loan spell with Kent during the 2017 season) and Essex's Dutch international seamer Shane Snater were both named in the team. Academy graduate Jordan Cox was also selected for his first senior appearance. Adam Rouse stood in as captain.

27 April	Pakistan; 358/7 (50 overs)	v	Kent (H); 258 (44.1 overs)	Pakistan won by 100 runs
Scorecard	Pakistan; 358/7 (50 overs)	v	Kent (H); 258 (44.1 overs)	County Cricket Ground, Beckenham; Umpires: NL Bainton and M Newell
Scorecard	Imad Wasim 117* (78 balls); Imran Qayyum 4/45 (10 overs)		AJ Blake 89 (48 balls); Yasir Shah 3/90 (10 overs)	County Cricket Ground, Beckenham; Umpires: NL Bainton and M Newell
Pakistan won the toss and chose to bat; JM Cox made his debut in senior cricket; S Snater made his Kent debut; OG Robinson and Imran Qayyum recorded their highest List A batting scores with 49 and 26 not out respectively				County Cricket Ground, Beckenham; Umpires: NL Bainton and M Newell

== Vitality Blast ==
=== South group ===
Pos	Team	Pld	W	L	T	NR	Ded	Pts	NRR
1	Sussex Sharks	14	8	3	1	2	0	19	0.803
2	Gloucestershire	14	7	3	1	3	0	18	0.242
3	Middlesex	14	7	6	0	1	0	15	0.216
4	Essex Eagles	14	5	4	1	4	0	15	−0.464
5	Kent Spitfires	14	6	6	0	2	0	14	0.000
6	Somerset	14	6	7	0	1	0	13	0.448
7	Hampshire	14	5	6	1	2	0	13	0.021
8	Surrey	14	5	7	1	1	0	12	−0.246
9	Glamorgan	14	1	8	1	4	0	7	−1.381

Source: Cricinfo

=== Matches ===
20 July	Kent (H); 165/9 (20 overs)	v	Somerset; 124 (18.3 overs)	Kent won by 41 runs
Scoreboard	Kent (H); 165/9 (20 overs)	v	Somerset; 124 (18.3 overs)	St Lawrence Ground, Canterbury; Umpires: RJ Bailey and JW Lloyds; Player of the match: Imran Qayyum (Kent)
Scoreboard	OG Robinson 53 (49); RE van der Merwe 3/19 (4 overs)		T Banton 28 (24); Imran Qayyum 5/21 (4 overs)	St Lawrence Ground, Canterbury; Umpires: RJ Bailey and JW Lloyds; Player of the match: Imran Qayyum (Kent)
Kent won the toss and chose to bat; Points: Kent 2, Somerset 0; JM Cox and OG Robinson made their Twenty20 debuts and Mohammad Nabi made his Kent debut				St Lawrence Ground, Canterbury; Umpires: RJ Bailey and JW Lloyds; Player of the match: Imran Qayyum (Kent)

21 July	Hampshire (H); 145/5 (20 overs)	v	Kent; 146/8 (19.5 overs)	Kent won by 2 wickets (with 1 ball remaining)
Scoreboard	Hampshire (H); 145/5 (20 overs)	v	Kent; 146/8 (19.5 overs)	Rose Bowl, Southampton; Umpires: NGB Cook and JH Evans; Player of the match: AJ Blake (Kent)
Scoreboard	JM Vince 51 (35); GC Viljoen 2/20 (4 overs)		AJ Blake 57* (38); KJ Abbott 3/22 (4 overs)	Rose Bowl, Southampton; Umpires: NGB Cook and JH Evans; Player of the match: AJ Blake (Kent)
Hampshire won the toss and elected to bat; Points: Hampshire 0, Kent 2				Rose Bowl, Southampton; Umpires: NGB Cook and JH Evans; Player of the match: AJ Blake (Kent)

26 July	Kent (H); 175/6 (20 overs)	v	Essex; 153/7 (20 overs)	Kent won by 22 runs
Scoreboard	Kent (H); 175/6 (20 overs)	v	Essex; 153/7 (20 overs)	St Lawrence Ground, Canterbury; Umpires: BJ Debenham and RT Robinson; Player of the match: HG Kuhn (Kent)
Scoreboard	HG Kuhn 55* (31); MR Quinn 2/40 (4 overs)		RN ten Doeschate 58* (46); GC Viljoen 2/28 (4 overs)	St Lawrence Ground, Canterbury; Umpires: BJ Debenham and RT Robinson; Player of the match: HG Kuhn (Kent)
Kent won the toss and chose to bat; Points: Kent 2, Essex 0				St Lawrence Ground, Canterbury; Umpires: BJ Debenham and RT Robinson; Player of the match: HG Kuhn (Kent)

30 July	Surrey (H); 54/4 (7 overs)	v	Kent; 55/1 (4 overs)	Kent won by 9 wickets (with 18 balls remaining)
Scorecard	Surrey (H); 54/4 (7 overs)	v	Kent; 55/1 (4 overs)	The Oval, London; Umpires: NA Mallender and R Warren; Player of the match: Mohammad Nabi (Kent)
Scorecard	AJ Finch 36* (20); GC Viljoen 2/10 (2 overs)		Mohammad Nabi 43* (12); Imran Tahir 1/22 (2 overs)	The Oval, London; Umpires: NA Mallender and R Warren; Player of the match: Mohammad Nabi (Kent)
Kent won the toss and chose to field; The match was initially reduced to 13 overs due to rain. After one ball of the Surrey innings rain forced the teams to leave the field and, after a delay, the match was reduced to 7 overs per side; Points: Surrey 0, Kent 2				The Oval, London; Umpires: NA Mallender and R Warren; Player of the match: Mohammad Nabi (Kent)

1 August	Kent; 204/4 (20 overs)	v	Middlesex (H); 176/7 (20 overs)	Kent won by 28 runs
Scorecard	Kent; 204/4 (20 overs)	v	Middlesex (H); 176/7 (20 overs)	Lord's, London; Umpires: IJ Gould and DJ Millns; Player of the match: AJ Blake (Kent)
Scorecard	AJ Blake 66* (29); ST Finn 2/40 (4 overs)		JA Simpson 37 (27); GC Viljoen 3/32 (4 overs)	Lord's, London; Umpires: IJ Gould and DJ Millns; Player of the match: AJ Blake (Kent)
Middlesex won the toss and chose to field; Points: Middlesex 0, Kent 2				Lord's, London; Umpires: IJ Gould and DJ Millns; Player of the match: AJ Blake (Kent)

2 August	Kent; 154/8 (20 overs)	v	Sussex (H); 158/1 (16 overs)	Sussex won by 9 wickets
Scorecard	Kent; 154/8 (20 overs)	v	Sussex (H); 158/1 (16 overs)	County Ground, Hove; Umpires: SJ O'Shaughnessy and R Warren; Player of the match: LJ Evans (Sussex)
Scorecard	DJ Bell-Drummond 50 (36); TS Mills 3/23 (4 overs)		LJ Evans 65* (35); AF Milne 1/27 (3 overs)	County Ground, Hove; Umpires: SJ O'Shaughnessy and R Warren; Player of the match: LJ Evans (Sussex)
Sussex won he toss and elected to field; Points: Sussex 2, Kent 0; JM Cox made his highest score in T20 cricket with 23 not out				County Ground, Hove; Umpires: SJ O'Shaughnessy and R Warren; Player of the match: LJ Evans (Sussex)

4 August	Hampshire; 135 (19.2 overs)	v	Kent (H); 138/6 (19.5 overs)	Kent won by 4 wickets (with 1 ball remaining)
Scorecard	Hampshire; 135 (19.2 overs)	v	Kent (H); 138/6 (19.5 overs)	County Ground, Beckenham; Umpires: NL Bainton and PK Baldwin; Player of the match: AF Milne (Kent)
Scorecard	JM Vince 44 (47); GC Viljoen 3/15 (3.2 overs)		HG Kuhn 41 (33); KJ Abbott 3/31 (3.5 overs)	County Ground, Beckenham; Umpires: NL Bainton and PK Baldwin; Player of the match: AF Milne (Kent)
Kent won the toss and chose to field; Points: Kent 2, Hampshire 0; G Stewart took his best bowling figures in T20 cricket, with 2/23				County Ground, Beckenham; Umpires: NL Bainton and PK Baldwin; Player of the match: AF Milne (Kent)

7 August	Kent; 125/8 (20 overs)	v	Gloucestershire (H); 131/5 (18.5 overs)	Gloucestershire won by 5 wickets (with 7 balls remaining)
Scorecard	Kent; 125/8 (20 overs)	v	Gloucestershire (H); 131/5 (18.5 overs)	County Ground, Bristol; Umpires: RT Robinson and AG Wharf; Player of the match: BAC Howell (Gloucestershire)
Scorecard	DJ Bell-Drummond 62 (56); CJ Liddle 2/23 (4 overs)		BAC Howell 25* (14); FJ Klaassen 2/24 (3.5 overs)	County Ground, Bristol; Umpires: RT Robinson and AG Wharf; Player of the match: BAC Howell (Gloucestershire)
Gloucestershire won the toss and chose to field; Points: Gloucestershire 2, Kent 0				County Ground, Bristol; Umpires: RT Robinson and AG Wharf; Player of the match: BAC Howell (Gloucestershire)

10 August	Somerset (H); 206/8 (20 overs)	v	Kent; 151 (18.4 overs)	Somerset won by 55 runs
Scorecard	Somerset (H); 206/8 (20 overs)	v	Kent; 151 (18.4 overs)	County Ground, Taunton; Umpires: NL Bainton and AG Wharf; Player of the match: T Banton (Somerset)
Scorecard	T Banton 100 (52 balls); DJ Bell-Drummond 2/19 (2 overs)		DJ Bell-Drummond 36 (26 balls); C Overton 3/32 (4 overs)	County Ground, Taunton; Umpires: NL Bainton and AG Wharf; Player of the match: T Banton (Somerset)
Somerset won the toss and chose to bat; Points: Somerset 2, Kent 0; DJ Bell-Drummond took his first wickets in T20 cricket				County Ground, Taunton; Umpires: NL Bainton and AG Wharf; Player of the match: T Banton (Somerset)

14 August	Kent (H)	v	Glamorgan	Match abandoned without a ball being bowled
Scorecard	Kent (H)	v	Glamorgan	St Lawrence Ground, Canterbury
No toss; Rain forced the abandonment of the match; Points: Kent 1, Glamorgan 1				St Lawrence Ground, Canterbury

16 August	Kent (H)	v	Sussex	Match abandoned without a ball being bowled
Scorecard	Kent (H)	v	Sussex	St Lawrence Ground, Canterbury
No toss; Rain forced the abandonment of the match; Points: Kent 1, Sussex 1				St Lawrence Ground, Canterbury

23 August	Kent (H); 171/7 (20 overs)	v	Surrey; 170/3 (20 overs)	Surrey won by 1 run
Scorecard	Kent (H); 171/7 (20 overs)	v	Surrey; 170/3 (20 overs)	St Lawrence Ground, Canterbury; Umpires: NJ Llong and PR Pollard; Player of the match: WG Jacks (Surrey)
Scorecard	WG Jacks 63 (27); Imran Qayyum 3/22 (4 overs)		DJ Bell-Drummond 64 (49); J Dernbach 2/27 (4 overs)	St Lawrence Ground, Canterbury; Umpires: NJ Llong and PR Pollard; Player of the match: WG Jacks (Surrey)
Surrey won the toss and chose to bat; ME Milnes and MK O'Riordan made their T20 debuts				St Lawrence Ground, Canterbury; Umpires: NJ Llong and PR Pollard; Player of the match: WG Jacks (Surrey)

29 August	Gloucestershire; 180/3 (20 overs)	v	Kent (H); 175/8 (20 overs)	Gloucestershire won by 5 runs
Scorecard	Gloucestershire; 180/3 (20 overs)	v	Kent (H); 175/8 (20 overs)	St Lawrence Ground, Canterbury; Umpires: M Burns and DJ Millns; Player of the match: M Klinger (Gloucestershire)
Scorecard	M Klinger 102 (65 balls); AJ Blake 1/17 (4 overs)		F du Plessis 60 (45 balls); RF Higgins 3/36 (4 overs)	St Lawrence Ground, Canterbury; Umpires: M Burns and DJ Millns; Player of the match: M Klinger (Gloucestershire)
Kent won the toss and chose to field; Points: Kent 0, Gloucestershire 2; F du Plessis made his Kent debut; AJ Blake took his first wicket in T20 cricket				St Lawrence Ground, Canterbury; Umpires: M Burns and DJ Millns; Player of the match: M Klinger (Gloucestershire)

30 August	Essex (H); 189/6 (20 overs)	v	Kent; 179 (20 overs)	Essex won by 10 runs
Scorecard	Essex (H); 189/6 (20 overs)	v	Kent; 179 (20 overs)	County Ground, Chelmsford; Umpires: IJ Gould and PK Baldwin; Player of the match: R Bopara (Essex)
Scorecard	CS Delport 64 (29 balls); DJ Bell-Drummond 2/25 (3 overs)		Z Crawley 89 (55 balls); JA Porter 3/28 (3 overs)	County Ground, Chelmsford; Umpires: IJ Gould and PK Baldwin; Player of the match: R Bopara (Essex)
Essex won the toss and chose to bat; Points: Essex 2, Kent 0; Z Crawley made his highest score in T20 cricket				County Ground, Chelmsford; Umpires: IJ Gould and PK Baldwin; Player of the match: R Bopara (Essex)
