= Bailey Wightman =

English cricketer (born 1999)

Personal information
- Full name: Bailey John Wightman
- Born: 16 June 1999 (age 27); Warwick, Warwickshire, England
- Height: 6 ft 5 in (1.96 m)
- Batting: Right-handed
- Bowling: Right-arm fast-medium
- Role: Bowler

Domestic team information
- Years: Team
- 2018: Cheshire
- 2021: Kent
- Only FC: 12 July 2021 Kent v Sussex

Career statistics
Competition	First-class
Matches	1
Runs scored	0
Batting average	0.00
100s/50s	0/0
Top score	0*
Balls bowled	72
Wickets	0
Bowling average	–
5 wickets in innings	–
10 wickets in match	–
Best bowling	–
Catches/stumpings	0/–
- Source: CricInfo, 14 July 2021

Bailey John Wightman (born 16 June 1999) is an English-born Australian cricketer. He made his first-class cricket debut for Kent County Cricket Club against Sussex on 12 July 2021 in the 2021 County Championship. Wightman made his debut as a second-day replacement for Nathan Gilchrist who had been asked to self-isolate following a close contact testing positive for COVID-19. Wightman was the sixth Kent debutant in the match. Five other players made their debut on the first day of the match, following another member of the county's First XI squad testing positive for COVID-19, which required the players involved in the county's previous match to all self-isolate. As a result, a number of Second XI players or "homegrown prospects" were drafted into the squad and made their senior debuts for the county.

Wightman was born at Warwick in 1999 and moved to Australia at the age of nine where he was educated at St Peter's College, Adelaide. He plays Grade cricket for Adelaide University Cricket Club, and in March 2020 played for the team in the National Premier T20 Championship. He was awarded a Don Stranks sports scholarship by the university in October 2020.

After appearing for South Australia's under-19 team in 2017, Wightman returned to the United Kingdom during the 2018 northern summer to play for Hyde Cricket Club in Cheshire and, later in the season, Bradford Premier League cricket for Bradford and Bingley Cricket Club in Yorkshire. He appeared for Cheshire County Cricket Club in the 2018 Minor Counties Championship and for Worcestershire's Second XI before playing for South Australia's emerging cricketers team during the southern summer. In 2019 he played for Bradford and Bingley and was signed to a short-term contract by Warwickshire County Cricket Club as cover for the injured Liam Norwell. Wightman played for Warwickshire's Second XI but did not make an appearance in the first team. In 2021 he played for Derbyshire's Second XI before appearing in four matches for Kent's Second XI ahead of his first-class debut, having played club cricket for Tunbridge Wells Cricket Club in the Kent Cricket League during the season.
