= Jack Walker (cricketer) =

English cricketer

Personal information
- Born: 2 March 1914; Cobham, Kent
- Died: 29 May 1968 (aged 54); Cobham, Kent
- Batting: Right-handed
- Role: Wicket-keeper
- Relatives: Matt Walker (grandson)

Domestic team information
- Years: Team
- 1949: Kent
- Only FC: 1 June 1949 Kent v Essex
- Source: Cricinfo, 5 April 2014

Jack Walker (2 March 1914 – 29 May 1968) was an English cricketer. He played one first-class match for Kent County Cricket Club in 1949.

Walker was born at Cobham in Kent in 1914, the son of William and Mabel Walker, and educated at Rochester Technical School. He played as a wicket-keeper at club level for Gravesend Cricket Club and made his only first-class appearance for Kent at The Bat and Ball Ground, playing against Essex in the 1949 County Championship Called into the side as a replacement for Godfrey Evans, who was playing in a trial match for the England Test side, he scored 19 runs, took two catches and made two stumping in the match which was played on his home club ground. He played twice for the county Second XI in the Minor Counties Championship and was chairman of Cobham Cricket Club for 21 years.

Walker died at Cobham in 1968 after collapsing aged 54. His son, Richard, played regularly for Middlesex and Kent's Second XIs and his grandson, Matt Walker played over 500 matches for Kent and Essex and later coached Kent.
