= Harry Houillon =

English cricketer (born 2001)

Personal information
- Full name: Harry Fraser Houillon
- Born: 12 December 2001 (age 24); Greenwich, Royal Borough of Greenwich
- Batting: Right-handed
- Role: Wicket-keeper

Domestic team information
- Years: Team
- 2021: Cambridge University
- 2021: Kent
- Only FC: 11 July 2021 Kent v Sussex

Career statistics
Competition	First-class
Matches	1
Runs scored	9
Batting average	4.50
100s/50s	0/0
Top score	9
Catches/stumpings	3/0
- Source: Cricinfo, 14 July 2021

Harry Fraser Houillon (born 12 December 2001) is an English cricketer. He made his first-class cricket debut for Kent County Cricket Club against Sussex on 11 July 2021 in the 2021 County Championship following a member of the county's First XI squad testing positive for COVID-19 which required the players involved in the county's previous match to all self-isolate. As a result, a number of Second XI players or "homegrown prospects" were drafted into the squad and made their senior debuts for the county.

Houillon was born at Greenwich in London in 2001 and was educated at Sevenoaks School before going up to Fitzwilliam College, Cambridge. He was considered the school's "outstanding performer" in 2018, scoring over 400 runs at an average of over 80 runs and innings, including a century against MCC. He plays club cricket for Sevenoaks Vine and appeared in Kent's age-group squads between 2016 and 2019 and the county Second XI in 2019. After going up to Cambridge he played for both the university side and Cambridge University Centre of Cricketing Excellence in 2021, winning a cricket blues each year from the 2021 University Match to 2024.
