= Elliot Hooper =

English cricketer (born 1996)

Personal information
- Full name: Elliot Owen Hooper
- Born: 22 March 1996 (age 30); Eastbourne, Sussex, England
- Batting: Left-handed
- Bowling: Slow left-arm orthodox
- Role: Bowler

Domestic team information
- Years: Team
- 2019: Sussex
- 2021: Kent (squad no. 42)
- 2023: Cambridgeshire
- Only FC: 18 August 2019 Sussex v Middlesex
- T20 debut: 16 July 2021 Kent v Middlesex

Career statistics
Competition	First-class	Twenty20
Matches	1	2
Runs scored	20	0
Batting average	20.00	–
100s/50s	0/0	0/0
Top score	20	0*
Balls bowled	125	48
Wickets	1	4
Bowling average	65.00	11.75
5 wickets in innings	0	0
10 wickets in match	0	0
Best bowling	1/65	3/24
Catches/stumpings	0/–	0/–
- Source: Cricinfo, 1 January 2025

Elliot Owen Hooper (born 22 March 1996) is an English cricketer. He made his first-class debut on 18 August 2019, for Sussex in the 2019 County Championship. He made his Twenty20 debut on 16 July 2021, for Kent in the 2021 T20 Blast.
