= James Logan (cricketer) =

English cricketer (born 1997)

Personal information
- Full name: James Edwin Graham Logan
- Born: 12 October 1997 (age 29); Wakefield, West Yorkshire, England
- Batting: Left-handed
- Bowling: Slow left-arm orthodox
- Role: Bowler

Domestic team information
- Years: Team
- 2018–2020: Yorkshire (squad no. 11)
- 2021: Kent (squad no. 11)
- FC debut: 24 September 2018 Yorkshire v Worcestershire
- LA debut: 22 July 2021 Kent v Durham

Career statistics
Competition	FC	LA	T20
Matches	6	6	2
Runs scored	84	46	–
Batting average	12.00	23.00	–
100s/50s	0/0	0/0	–
Top score	21	17*	–
Balls bowled	481	198	24
Wickets	12	3	2
Bowling average	17.00	69.00	9.00
5 wickets in innings	0	0	0
10 wickets in match	0	0	0
Best bowling	4/22	2/45	1/4
Catches/stumpings	2/–	0/–	1/–
- Source: Cricinfo, 15 September 2021

James Edwin Graham Logan (born 12 October 1997) is an English professional cricketer who played for Kent between 2021 and 2023, and Yorkshire between 2018 and 2020.

Logan was born in Wakefield, West Yorkshire and played for Yorkshire's age group and Academy teams, as well as the club's Second XI. A slow left-arm orthodox spin bowler, he made his first-class debut for Yorkshire in the 2018 County Championship on 24 September 2018.

In his second first-class match against Warwickshire played at York's Clifton Park Ground in June 2019, Logan took four wickets for 22 runs in Warwickshire's second innings.

He was released by Yorkshire when his contract expired at the end of the 2020 season having played only twice for the county's First XI, and signed a two-month contract with Kent in June 2021 after impressing playing in the county's Second XI. He made his Twenty20 debut on 9 June 2021, taking 1/14 from three overs on debut, and his List A debut on 22 July in the 2021 Royal London One-Day Cup. On 27 July 2021, Logan signed a two-year contract extension with Kent.

After playing a total of 12 matches for Kent during the 2021, Logan was unable to break into the First XI in either of the following seasons, although he played regularly for the county's Second XI. At the end of the 2023 season he was released by Kent.
