= Joe Gordon (cricketer) =

English cricketer (born 2002)

Personal information
- Full name: Joseph Archie Gordon
- Born: 18 May 2002 (age 24); Coffs Harbour, New South Wales, Australia
- Batting: Right-handed
- Bowling: Right-arm medium
- Role: Batsman

Domestic team information
- Years: Team
- 2021: Kent
- Only FC: 11 July 2021 Kent v Sussex
- Only LA: 8 August 2021 Kent v Hampshire

Career statistics
Competition	First-class	List A
Matches	1	1
Runs scored	8	9
Batting average	4.00	9.00
100s/50s	0/0	0/0
Top score	8	9
Catches/stumpings	0/–	0/–
- Source: Cricinfo, 24 August 2021

Joseph Archie Gordon (born 18 May 2002) is an Australian-born English cricketer. He made his first-class cricket debut for Kent County Cricket Club against Sussex on 11 July 2021 in the 2021 County Championship following a member of the county's First XI squad testing positive for COVID-19 which required the players involved in the county's previous match to all self-isolate. As a result, several Second XI players or "homegrown prospects" were drafted into the squad and made their senior debuts for the county.

Gordon was born at Coffs Harbour in New South Wales where he played under-14 cricket. After moving to the United Kingdom, he was educated at St Edmund's School, Canterbury where he averaged over 100 runs an innings in 2019. He was a member of Kent's cricket academy, played age-group cricket for Kent between 2016 and 2019 and the county's Second XI between 2018 and 2020 as well as club cricket for Canterbury Cricket Club in the Kent Cricket League. He made his List A debut on 8 August 2021, for Kent in the 2021 Royal London One-Day Cup, scoring nine runs.
