= Ollie Robinson (cricketer, born 1998) =

English cricketer

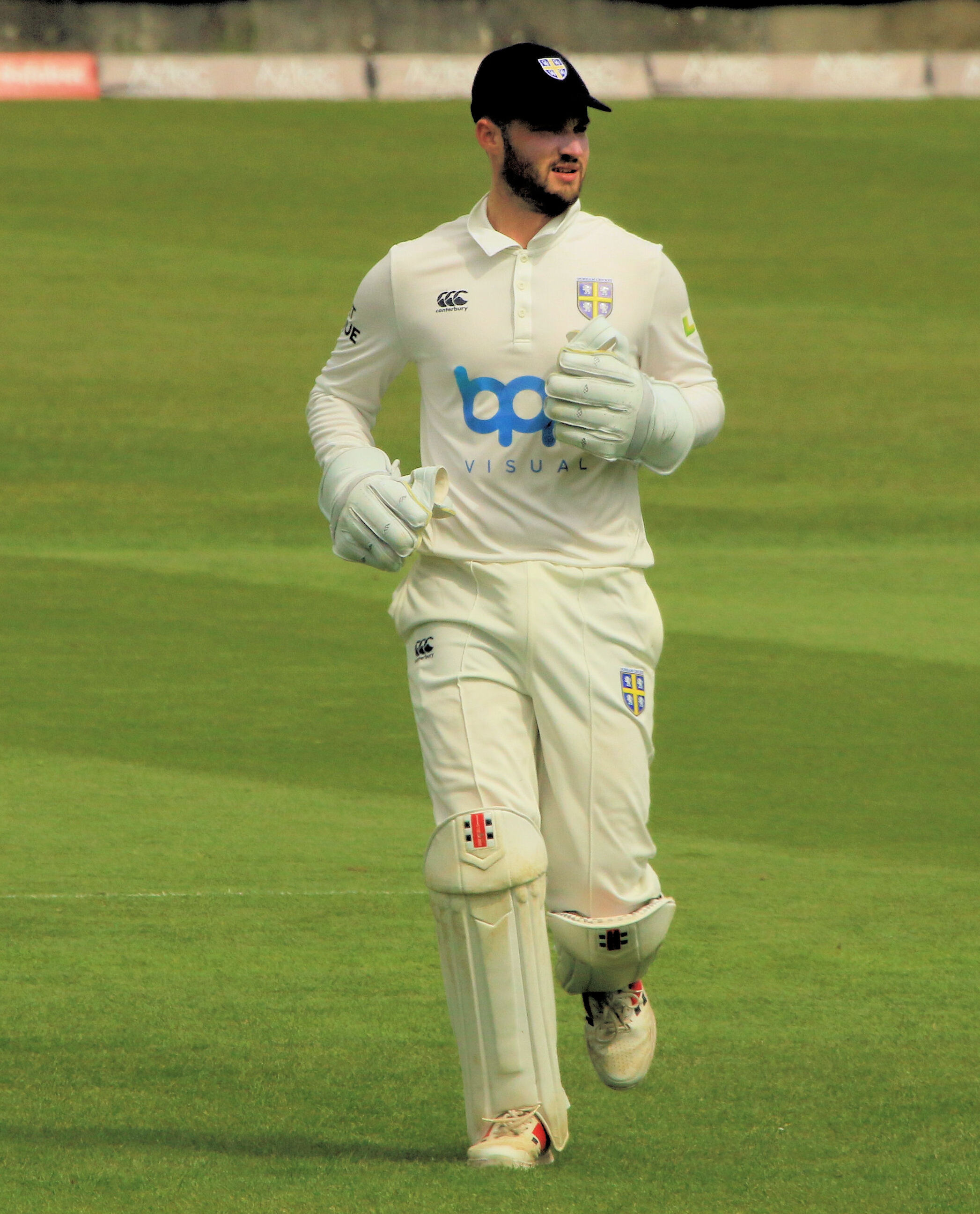
- Robinson in 2023

Personal information
- Full name: Oliver George Robinson (Note: Robinson's middle name was originally given as Graham on both CricInfo and CricketArchive.)
- Born: 1 December 1998 (age 27); Sidcup, London, England
- Batting: Right-handed
- Role: Wicket-keeper

Domestic team information
- Years: Team
- 2017–2022: Kent (squad no. 21)
- 2022: → Durham (loan)
- 2023–present: Durham (squad no. 21)
- 2024: Northern Superchargers
- 2025: Gulf Giants
- LA debut: 12 February 2017 Kent v West Indies U19
- FC debut: 19 August 2018 Kent v Leicestershire

Career statistics
Competition	FC	LA	T20
Matches	108	43	103
Runs scored	5,445	1,360	1,708
Batting average	35.58	38.85	23.08
100s/50s	10/30	2/7	0/8
Top score	198	206*	70
Catches/stumpings	317/15	32/3	45/12
- Source: Cricinfo, 27 September 2026

Oliver George Robinson (born 1 December 1998) is a professional cricketer who plays for Durham County Cricket Club. He plays as either a wicket-keeper or as a specialist batsman and made his debut for Kent in 2017.

== Early life ==
Robinson was born in Sidcup and attended Hurstmere School before studying for A Levels at Chislehurst and Sidcup Grammar School. He played age group cricket for Kent, scoring 251 for the under-17 team during 2016, and plays club cricket for Beckenham, having previously played for Bexley and Sidcup. He was awarded a place in Kent's cricket academy in 2014 and won the John Aitken Grey Trophy, awarded to the most promising academy scholar of the year, in both 2016 and 2017.

== Senior cricket career ==
Robinson made his debut for Kent's Second XI in June 2015 and had made six appearances before being drafted into the Kent squad for the 2016–17 Regional Super50 tournament in the West Indies in January and February 2017 as cover for Adam Rouse with Sam Billings on England duty. He made his debut for the senior Kent team in their final match of the tournament against West Indies under-19s on 12 February 2017.

More Second XI appearances followed in the 2017 domestic season and Robinson scored his maiden century for the Second XI against Sussex Second XI in May 2017. Fielding as a replacement for Rouse who had injured his thumb earlier in the match, Robinson claimed his first catch in first-class cricket on the final day of a County Championship match against Leicestershire later in the same month. In July 2017 he was named in the England under-19 squad for a series of matches against India under-19s during July and August.

At the end of the 2017 season Robinson was named as the Kent Cricket League Young Cricketer of the Year and signed his first professional contract with Kent. Robinson was selected for Kent's squad for the 2017–18 Regional Super50 competition ahead of the 2018 English season but did not play as the county advanced to the semi-finals of the tournament. Good scores for the Second XI at the start of the season, including a double century, saw him selected again by England under-19s in June for a series of Test matches against South Africa under-19s. After being involved on the fringes of the First XI in a number of matches, Robinson made his first-class cricket debut for Kent in August 2018 in the County Championship at Leicester.

Following an injury to Kent's first-choice wicket-keeper Sam Billings, Robinson took over as the county's wicket-keeper in County Championship matches during the 2019 season. He scored his maiden first-class century against Warwickshire in April and signed a contract extension in June 2019, following interest from other counties during the early part of the season. He made his Twenty20 debut in Kent's first match of the 2019 t20 Blast, scoring a half century and making a stumping on debut. He finished the season as the leading wicketkeeper in the County Championship with 54 dismissals.

After playing in all of Kent's Bob Willis Trophy matches during the COVID-19 shortened 2020 season, Robinson signed a contract extension in December 2020, extending his contract to the end of the 2023 season. During the 2022 season Robinson spent the 2022 T20 Blast part of the season on loan at Durham in order to ensure that he played competitive cricket during that part of the season. He returned to play for Kent later in the season and was awarded his county cap before playing in the county's winning One-Day Cup team. He scored the first double hundred of his career during the campaign, making a Kent record 206 not out against Worcestershire in August. He also played in the team's final County Championship matches of the season, but towards the end of September announced that he would be joining Durham on a three-year contract ahead of the 2023 season. in January 2025, Robinson agreed a contract extension with Durham to keep him at the club until the end of the 2027 season.
