= Marcus O'Riordan =

English cricketer (born 1998)

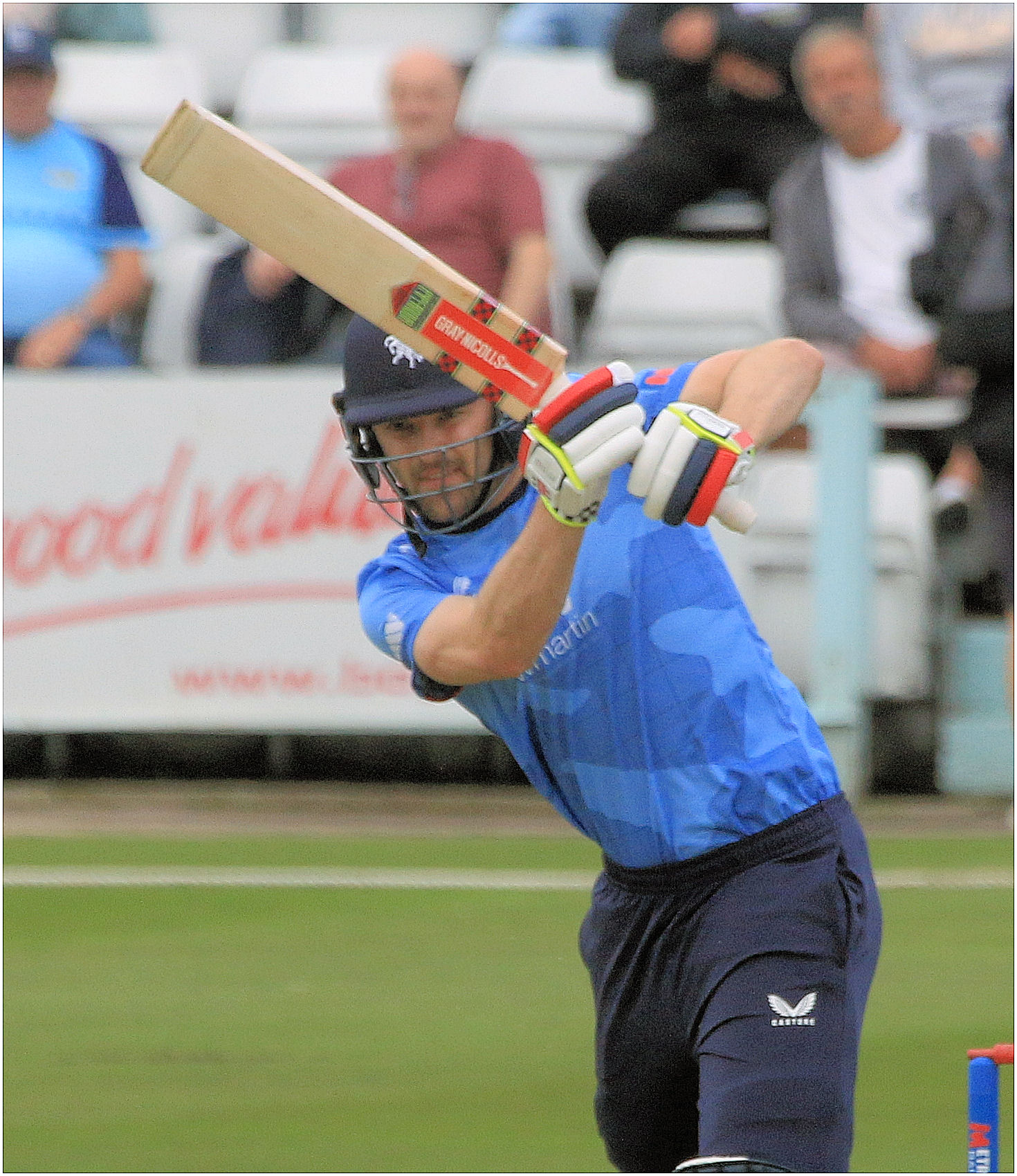
- O'Riordan in 2023

Personal information
- Full name: Marcus Kevin O'Riordan
- Born: 25 January 1998 (age 28); Pembury, Kent, England
- Batting: Right-handed
- Bowling: Right-arm off-break
- Role: All-rounder

Domestic team information
- Years: Team
- 2019–2024: Kent (squad no. 55)
- FC debut: 10 September 2019 Kent v Notts
- LA debut: 22 July 2021 Kent v Durham

Career statistics
Competition	FC	LA	T20
Matches	19	13	17
Runs scored	631	193	168
Batting average	27.43	19.18	12.00
100s/50s	1/1	0/2	0/0
Top score	102*	60	33
Balls bowled	1,151	169	202
Wickets	14	4	10
Bowling average	53.50	48.25	27.20
5 wickets in innings	0	0	0
10 wickets in match	0	0	0
Best bowling	3/50	3/36	2/24
Catches/stumpings	9/–	5/–	4/–
- Source: Cricinfo, 1 October 2025

Marcus Kevin O'Riordan (born 25 January 1998) is an English former professional cricketer who played for Kent County Cricket Club between 2019 and 2025.

O'Riordan was born at Pembury in Kent and was educated at Tonbridge School, where he played in the school cricket XI. He signed his first professional contract in August 2019 and made his debut for Kent later the same month in a 2019 t20 Blast match against Surrey at Canterbury. He made his first-class debut for Kent in a County Championship match against Nottinghamshire on 10 September 2019 at Nottingham.

O'Riordan's parents are from County Cork, Republic of Ireland, and he began the 2019 season playing for Muckamore Cricket Club in County Antrim, Northern Ireland. He trained with Northern Knights and played for the Irish Senior Academy team during the team's tour of England in April 2019 before being called back by Kent, where he had been part of the county's Cricket Academy for the previous seven years. He played age-group cricket for the county from under-11 level and first played for Kent's Second XI in 2014. During the 2019/20 northern winter, O'Riordan played New South Wales Grade cricket for Belmont.

O'Riordan took his first first-class wickets in Kent's opening match of the 2020 season. After scoring 42 not out in Kent's first innings, he took 3/71 in Essex's first innings. He took a further three wickets in the following match, setting new best bowling figures of 3/50 against Sussex at Canterbury. He made his List A debut on 22 July 2021 in the 2021 Royal London One-Day Cup.

He suffered a shoulder injury whilst fielding and missed the second half of the 2022 season, although he returned to play for Kent in 2023. After playing a total of 49 First XI matches for Kent, O'Riordan left the club at the end of the 2025 season. A back injury had restricted his cricket during the season.
