= Nathan Gilchrist =

English cricketer

Personal information
- Full name: Nathan Nicholas Gilchrist
- Born: 11 June 2000 (age 26); Harare, Zimbabwe
- Batting: Right-handed
- Bowling: Right-arm fast
- Role: Bowler

Domestic team information
- Years: Team
- 2018–2020: Somerset (squad no. 19)
- 2020: → Kent (on loan)
- 2021–2025: Kent (squad no. 17)
- 2025: → Middlesex (on loan)
- 2025: → Warwickshire (on loan)
- 2026: Warwickshire (squad no. 18)
- 2026: → Leicestershire (on loan)
- FC debut: 22 August 2020 Kent v Surrey
- LA debut: 28 July 2021 Kent v Lancashire

Career statistics
Competition	FC	LA	T20
Matches	45	32	21
Runs scored	399	98	25
Batting average	9.50	7.00	4.16
100s/50s	0/0	0/0	0/0
Top score	41	33	10*
Balls bowled	6,634	1,114	338
Wickets	141	30	29
Bowling average	32.03	41.56	20.20
5 wickets in innings	4	1	0
10 wickets in match	0	0	0
Best bowling	7/100	5/45	4/42
Catches/stumpings	12/–	8/–	4/–
- Source: Cricinfo, 26 September 2026

Nathan Nicholas Gilchrist (born 11 June 2000) is a professional cricketer who plays for Warwickshire County Cricket Club.

Gilchrist was born at Harare in Zimbabwe in 2000 and grew up in South Africa. His father is English and he holds a British passport, allowing him to play domestic cricket as an English player. After being educated at St Stithians College in Johannesburg, Gilchrist moved to England in 2016 to attend King's College, Taunton, initially on a three-month cricket exchange programme from St Stithians. He joined the Somerset County Cricket Club academy system and first played Second XI cricket for the team in 2016 before signing a professional contract with the club after leaving school in 2018. In August 2020 he joined Kent, initially on loan for the remainder of the 2020 season with a three-year contract which began in November 2020.

Gilchrist made his first-class cricket debut for Kent on 22 August 2020, playing in a 2020 Bob Willis Trophy match against Surrey at The Oval, and his List A cricket debut on 28 July 2021 against Lancashire in the 2021 Royal London One-Day Cup.

On 1 May 2022, after being dismissed for a pair in a County Championship match at Headingley, Gilchrist equalled the record of six consecutive ducks in first-class cricket.

Gilchrist signed a new one-year contract with Kent in October 2024 following a season where he took 19 County Championship wickets at an average of 42.68 in 12 appearances.

In July 2025, it was announced that Gilchrist would be joining Warwickshire on a three-year contract at the end of the season. Ahead of this, he signed on loan for Middlesex for the remainder of the 2025 One-Day Cup in August.
