= Matthew Walker (English cricketer) =

English cricketer (born 1974)

Matt Walker
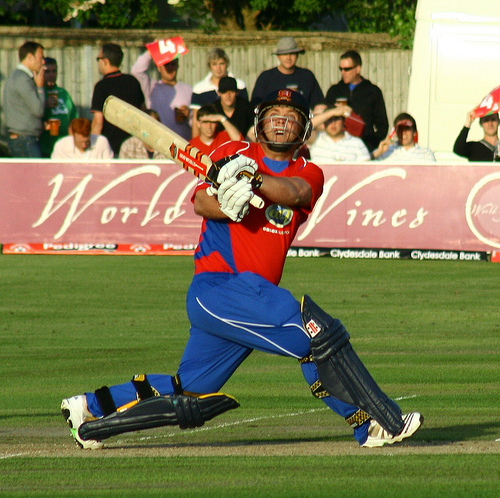

Personal information
- Full name: Matthew Jonathan Walker
- Born: 2 January 1974 (age 52); Gravesend, Kent, England
- Nickname: Walks
- Height: 5 ft 6 in (1.68 m)
- Batting: Left-handed
- Bowling: Right-arm medium
- Role: Batsman
- Relatives: Jack Walker (grandfather)

Domestic team information
- Years: Team
- 1993–2008: Kent (squad no. 20)
- 2009–2011: Essex (squad no. 22)
- FC debut: 30 March 1993 Kent v Zimbabwe B
- LA debut: 17 July 1994 Kent v Worcestershire

Career statistics
Competition	FC	LA	T20
Matches	223	285	82
Runs scored	12,197	6,269	1,397
Batting average	36.08	29.15	21.82
100s/50s	28/51	3/37	0/4
Top score	275*	117	74*
Balls bowled	2,154	904	0
Wickets	28	30	–
Bowling average	45.50	25.30	–
5 wickets in innings	0	0	–
10 wickets in match	0	0	–
Best bowling	3/35	4/24	–
Catches/stumpings	15/–	75/–	10/–
- Source: CricInfo, 2 June 2013

Matthew Jonathan Walker (born 2 January 1974), known as Matt Walker, is a retired English professional cricketer and former head coach of Kent County Cricket Club. Walker was appointed as head coach in January 2017 having been assistant coach at the county since the 2014 season and held the role until the end of the 2024 season. He played for Kent for 16 seasons until 2008 and then for three seasons for Essex until he retired in 2011.

== Early career ==
Walker was born in Gravesend and, after enjoying a prolific school cricket record at The King's School, Rochester, made his first appearance for Kent in a Second XI match against Lancashire in 1990. He continued to play in the Second XI for two seasons, after which he was called up to the England under-19 squad for their tour of Pakistan.

The tour started poorly for Walker, only making one score of note in the series although he managed to average 48.00 in the limited-overs games that followed. He continued to appear for the England under-19 team until the end of the West Indian tour of England, by which time he had earned an average of 42.07 from 12 youth Tests.

== Professional career ==
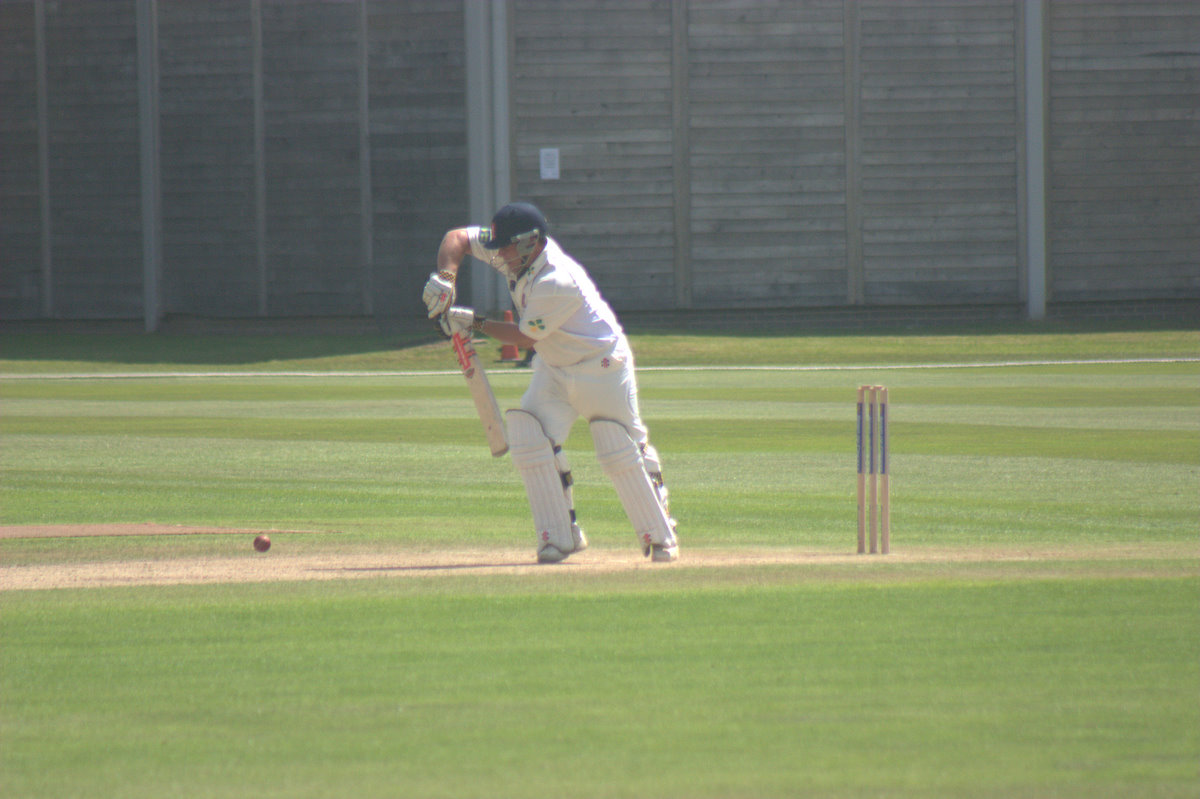
Walker playing for Essex against Cambridge UCCE

Walker was selected for Kent's first-team for the first time during the team's 1993 pre-season tour of Zimbabwe. Against a Zimbabwean 'B' team, he scored 23 not out and 16 in a drawn match. Despite the promise shown on the tour, Walker would not play for the first-team for another fifteen months.

His List A cricket debut came on 17 July 1994, in a Sunday League match against Worcestershire. In nine matches that season, Walker averaged 23.37.

In first-class cricket, Walker had three seasons where he finished with a batting average of over fifty: in 1996, 2004 and 2006. 1996 saw Walker hit the highest score of his career to date, on his way to 606 runs at an average of 60.60. Against a Somerset attack without Andy Caddick, Walker compiled 275 not out in nine-and-a-half hours before his captain Trevor Ward declared the innings at 616/7. The Daily Telegraph's Christopher Martin-Jenkins wrote of the innings: "It was an innings of style and substance, memorable for powerful driving through the off-side and hearty pulling whenever a persevering but ordinary Somerset attack became impatient with line and length and tried to extract a spring in the pitch which simply was not there." It remains the highest score by a Kent batsman at the St Lawrence Ground.

Despite the talent he had shown during his innings against Somerset, he found the next few seasons difficult. In an interview with All Out Cricket magazine, he said "I’d had a bit of first team cricket, and was dropped and managed to work my way back into the team in the second half of the year but just couldn’t get it right." For four seasons, between 1997 and 2000, Walker consistently averaged in the mid-twenties, scoring just one century in the process. Since then, he has scored over one thousand runs in a season on three occasions.

Walker's most productive season in terms of run-scoring was 2006, in which he scored 1,419 runs at the average of 61.19. In the game against Lancashire that year, he came close to adding a second career double-century to his name. However, he was dismissed on 197, run out after collapsing with cramp. His run-scoring throughout 2006 earned him Kent's Player of the Year award.

Walker was appointed List A captain of Kent for the second half of the 2005 season, following the resignation of David Fulton. However, he was unable to lead the team any higher than eighth in the second division of the Pro40 League.

In 2007, Walker hit the highest score of the innings in Kent's victory over Gloucestershire in the Twenty20 Cup Final. However, after finding first-team opportunities limited during 2008, he was released by Kent and signed for Essex on a two-year contract.

== Coaching career ==
In the winter of 2011, Graham Gooch stepped down in his role as Essex batting coach to work full-time with the England team and Walker was appointed to the same role, retiring as a player. In April 2014 he re-joined Kent as an assistant to head coach Jimmy Adams, having left Essex in order to return to his "home club". After Adams left Kent in October 2016 to return to the Caribbean, Walker was appointed head coach of the club in January 2017. Following Kent's promotion to Division One of the County Championship in 2018, Walker's contract was extended. He left Kent at the end of the 2024 season.
