= Matt Milnes =

English cricketer (born 1994)

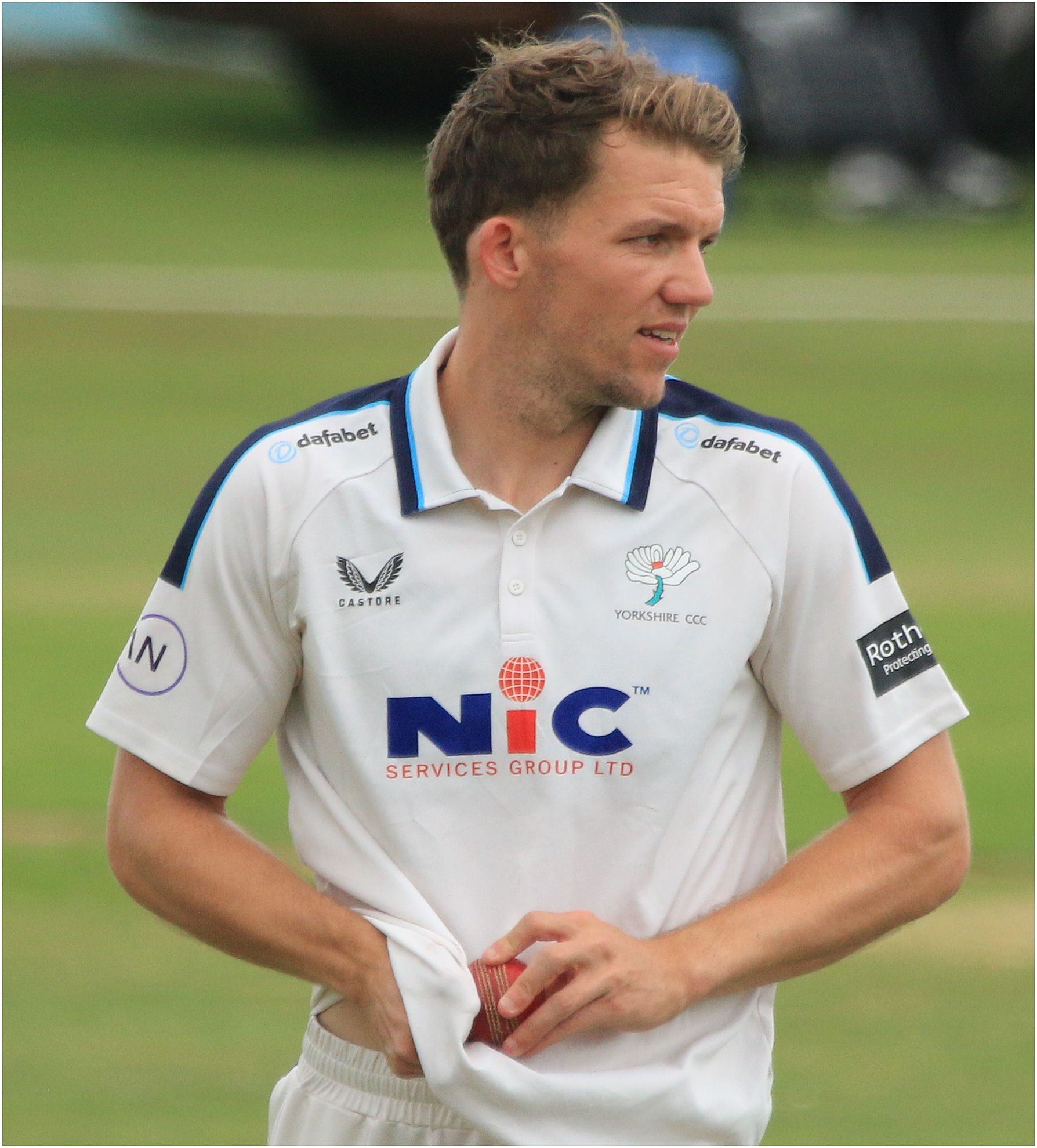
- Milnes in 2025

Personal information
- Full name: Matthew Edward Milnes
- Born: 29 July 1994 (age 32); Nottingham, Nottinghamshire
- Batting: Right-handed
- Bowling: Right-arm medium-fast
- Role: Bowler

Domestic team information
- Years: Team
- 2014–2017: Durham MCCU
- 2018: Nottinghamshire (squad no. 16)
- 2019–2022, 2026: Kent (squad no. 8)
- 2021: Welsh Fire
- 2022: Oval Invincibles
- 2023–2025: Yorkshire (squad no. 4)
- FC debut: 1 April 2014 Durham MCCU v Derbyshire
- LA debut: 17 April 2019 Kent v Hampshire

Career statistics
Competition	FC	LA	T20
Matches	64	23	67
Runs scored	1,386	165	139
Batting average	19.52	16.50	9.92
100s/50s	0/5	0/0	0/0
Top score	78	33	16*
Balls bowled	10,254	1,129	1,303
Wickets	218	46	72
Bowling average	26.46	23.60	27.22
5 wickets in innings	9	2	1
10 wickets in match	0	0	0
Best bowling	6/12	7/38	5/22
Catches/stumpings	20/–	9/–	18/–
- Source: Cricinfo, 27 September 2026

Matthew Edward Milnes (born 29 July 1994) is an English professional cricketer who currently plays for Kent County Cricket Club, having returned in 2026 from Yorkshire. Milnes was born in Nottingham and grew up in the city and attended West Bridgford School in the city before going to Durham University. A seam bowler, he was part of the Nottinghamshire Academy programme before making his first-class cricket debut in April 2014 for Durham MCC University against Derbyshire. He received a Half-Palatinate for his cricketing activities at university.

Whilst at university Milnes played for Durham Second XI in 2013 and 2014 and for Nottinghamshire's Second XI from 2016. After graduating from university he initially signed a three-month contract with Nottinghamshire in June 2017 after impressing the club with his performances for the Second XI. At the end of the season he attracted interest from Durham before signing a one-year deal with Nottinghamshire. He made his Nottinghamshire debut in June 2018 before going on to play six times for the county during the season, taking 11 wickets.

In September 2018 he signed a three-year contract with Kent for the start of the 2019 season despite being offered a contract extension by Nottinghamshire, making his Kent debut in the county's first match of the 2019 season against Loughborough MCCU. He made his List A cricket debut on 17 April 2019, taking a five-wicket haul on debut for Kent against Hampshire in the 2019 Royal London One-Day Cup. After having been signed as a replacement for Welsh Fire during the 2021 season of The Hundred, in April 2022 Milnes was drafted by Oval Invincibles for the 2022 season.

After taking 193 wickets in 94 appearances for Kent, including 126 in first-class matches, Milnes signed for Yorkshire ahead of the 2023 season. He played for Yorkshire for three seasons, although a number of back injuries restricted his appearances. He had only played five County Championship matches for Yorkshire before, in August 2025, he agreed to rejoin Kent for the following season.
