= Kent County Cricket Club in 2023 =

2023 season of an English cricket team

Kent County Cricket Club
2023 season
- Coach: (England) Matthew Walker
- Captain: (England) Sam Billings
- Overseas players: (South Africa) George Linde; (Australia) Wes Agar; (India) Arshdeep Singh (CC only); (Australia) Kane Richardson (T20 only); (Australia) James Bazley (ODC only); (India) Yuzvendra Chahal (CC only)
- Ground(s): St Lawrence Ground, Canterbury; County Ground, Beckenham
- County Championship: 8th, Division One
- One-Day Cup: 4th, Group A
- T20 Blast: 5th, South Group

In 2023, Kent County Cricket Club competed in the 2023 County Championship, the 2023 One-Day Cup and the 2023 T20 Blast. The season was the seventh in charge for head coach, and former player, Matthew Walker. Sam Billings retained the club captaincy that he was first awarded in 2018. In June 2023, Billings stepped down as captain in the County Championship for the remainder of the season after a run of poor form in the format, with Jack Leaning taking over the captaincy. Ryan ten Doeschate left his position as batting coach after a single season with Kent, to take up a role with the Kolkata Knight Riders. Former Worcestershire head coach Alex Gidman joined Kent as a replacement for ten Doeschate.

== Squad ==
=== Departures ===
On 29 July 2022, Matt Milnes signed a contract to join Yorkshire at the end of the season. In August it was announced that Darren Stevens would be released at the end of the season after 17 years with Kent. Stevens played over 630 games for Kent, scored more than 28,000 runs and took almost 900 wickets. On 23 September 2022, the club announced that wicketkeeper-batsman Ollie Robinson would be leaving the club at the end of the season to join Durham. In November 2022, Harry Podmore signed for Glamorgan.

At the end of the season, following his one-year stint at the county, Michael Hogan retired from cricket.

=== Arrivals ===
On 30 July 2022, Kent signed 20 year-old Joey Evison from Nottinghamshire, initially on loan for the One-Day Cup before joining on a three-year contract from the start of the 2023 season. In October 2022, Harry Finch signed a two-year contract to run until the end of the 2024 season. Finch had previously had short spells with Kent in 2021 season when the squad had been severely affected by COVID-19. and again in 2022 season as cover for a number of players absent due to injuries and The Hundred.

In November 2022, Kent signed Australian veteran Michael Hogan. Hogan had originally planned to retire at the end of the 2022 season, which was his tenth year with Glamorgan. In December 2022, Kent announced that Australian international fast-bowler Kane Richardson would play for the county as an overseas player for the 2023 T20 Blast. In March 2023, Indian bowler Arshdeep Singh agreed to play up to five County Championship matches in June and July for the county. In April 2023, Connor McKerr rejoined the county on loan from Surrey for two County Championship matches to cover for injuries in the bowling unit, having previously had a spell with Kent at the end of the 2022 season. Two days later, Australian bowler Wes Agar signed for Kent to play four County Championship matches until Arshdeep Singh arrives in June. Agar later signed an extension to keep him with Kent until the end of July.

In May 2023, Bangladesh-born seam bowler Arafat Bhuiyan signed a professional contract with Kent for the remainder of the season, after a spell with the 2nd XI and playing in the Kent League for Blackheath.

In June 2023, Kent announced that England leg-spinner Matt Parkinson would join from Lancashire at the end of the season. In July, it was announced that Parkinson would also join on loan this summer for the One Day Cup.

On 25 July, due to several players being unavailable due to injuries and international duty, Kent signed batters Toby Albert and Ben Geddes on loan from Hampshire and Surrey, respectively, on loan for a County Championship match against Nottinghamshire.

Brisbane Heat and Queensland all-rounder James Bazley, joined Kent for the One Day Cup.

In August, Kent announced that New Zealand bowler Ben Lister would join the club to play the final three County Championship matches, subject to international call-ups. On 6 September, Indian leg spin bowler Yuzvendra Chahal signed to play im Kent's final three County Championship matches. On 10 September, following further injuries, Kent signed spin bowler Aron Nijjar on loan from Essex for the last three games of the season.

At the end of the season, bowler George Garrett signed a two-year contract with Kent to join from Warwickshire.

=== Squad list ===
- Ages given as of the first day of the County Championship, 6 April 2023.

No.	Name	Nationality	Birth date	Batting style	Bowling style	Notes
Batsmen
2	Ben Compton	England	29 March 1994 (aged 29)	Left-handed	Right-arm off break	
6	Joe Denly	England	16 March 1986 (aged 37)	Right-handed	Right-arm leg break	
10	Alex Blake	England	25 January 1989 (aged 34)	Left-handed	Right-arm off break	White-ball contract only
14	Tawanda Muyeye	Zimbabwe	5 March 2001 (aged 22)	Right-handed	Right-arm off break	Qualifies as a domestic player
16	Zak Crawley	England	3 February 1998 (aged 25)	Right-handed	Right-arm medium	
23	Daniel Bell-Drummond	England	3 August 1993 (aged 29)	Right-handed	Right-arm medium	Vice-captain
34	Jack Leaning	England	18 October 1993 (aged 29)	Right-handed	Right-arm medium/off break	
72	Harry Finch	England	10 February 1995 (aged 28)	Right-handed	Right-arm medium-fast	
All-rounders
9	Grant Stewart	Italy	19 February 1994 (aged 29)	Right-handed	Right-arm medium	EU passport
27	George Linde	South Africa	4 December 1991 (aged 31)	Left-handed	Slow left-arm orthodox	Overseas player (April–July)
33	Joey Evison	England	14 November 2001 (aged 21)	Right-handed	Right arm medium	
42	Jaydn Denly	England	5 January 2006 (aged 17)	Left-handed	Slow left arm orthodox	
55	Marcus O'Riordan	England	25 January 1998 (aged 25)	Right-handed	Right-arm off break	
77	James Bazley	Australia	8 April 1995 (aged 27)	Right-handed	Right-arm fast-medium	Overseas player, One Day Cup only (August)
Wicket-keepers
7	Sam Billings	England	15 June 1991 (aged 31)	Right-handed	—	Club captain
22	Jordan Cox	England	21 October 2000 (aged 22)	Right-handed	—	
Bowlers
8	Wes Agar	Australia	5 February 1997 (aged 26)	Right-handed	Right-arm fast-medium	Overseas player (April–July)
11	James Logan	England	12 October 1997 (aged 25)	Left-handed	Slow left-arm orthodox	
17	Nathan Gilchrist	South Africa	11 June 2000 (aged 22)	Left-handed	Right-arm fast-medium	UK passport
18	Fred Klaassen	Netherlands	13 November 1992 (aged 30)	Right-handed	Left-arm medium-fast	
19	Jas Singh	England	19 September 2002 (aged 20)	Right-handed	Right-arm fast-medium	
26	Arafat Bhuiyan	England	11 October 1996 (aged 26)	Right-handed	Right-arm fast-medium	
27	Yuzvendra Chahal	India	23 June 1990 (aged 32)	Right-handed	Right-arm leg break	Overseas player (County Championship, September)
28	Matt Parkinson	England	24 October 1996 (aged 26)	Right-handed	Right-arm leg break	On loan from Lancashire (One Day Cup)
31	Michael Hogan	Australia	31 May 1981 (aged 41)	Right-handed	Right-arm fast-medium	UK passport
47	Kane Richardson	Australia	12 February 1991 (aged 32)	Right-handed	Right-arm fast-medium	Overseas player (T20 Blast)
64	Matt Quinn	New Zealand	28 February 1993 (aged 30)	Right-handed	Right-arm medium-fast	UK passport
75	Hamidullah Qadri	England	5 January 2000 (aged 23)	Right-handed	Right-arm off break	
99	Arshdeep Singh	India	5 February 1999 (aged 24)	Left-handed	Left-arm fast-medium	Overseas player (County Championship, June–July)

The following players featured in at least game while on loan from other counties: Toby Albert, Ben Geddes, Connor McKerr and Aron Nijjar.

== County Championship ==
=== Division One ===
Pos	Team	Pld	W	L	T	D	Bat	Bowl	Ded	Pts	
1	Surrey	14	8	2	0	4	27	41	0	216	
2	Essex	14	7	3	0	4	25	39	0	196	
3	Hampshire	14	8	4	0	2	18	39	3	192	
4	Warwickshire	14	6	4	0	4	22	41	0	179	
5	Lancashire	14	3	1	0	10	29	35	1	161	
6	Nottinghamshire	14	4	4	0	6	18	39	0	151	
7	Somerset	14	3	4	0	7	25	40	0	148	
8	Kent	14	2	7	0	5	20	34	0	111	
9	Middlesex (Note: Middlesex's points include 8 for batting last in a drawn match where the scores finished level.)	14	3	9	0	2	5	39	1	104	Relegation to Division 2
10	Northamptonshire	14	2	8	0	4	10	34	0	96	Relegation to Division 2

Source: ESPNCricinfo

6–9 April	Northamptonshire	v	Kent (H)	Kent won by 7 wickets
Scorecard	117 (32.5 overs); Ricardo Vasconcelos 39 (70); Matt Quinn 4/25 (9.5 overs)		222 (69.4 overs); Zak Crawley 91 (171); Chris Tremain 5/44 (18 overs)	St Lawrence Ground, Canterbury; Umpires: Ian Blackwell and Peter Hartley
Scorecard	331 (117.3 overs); Rob Keogh 116* (211); Joey Evison 4/62 (25.3 overs)		227/3 (64.5 overs); Ben Compton 114* (197); Chris Tremain 2/40 (13 overs)	St Lawrence Ground, Canterbury; Umpires: Ian Blackwell and Peter Hartley
Kent won the toss and chose to field.; No play was possible before lunch on day one due to rain.; Points: Kent 19, Northamptonshire 3; Michael Hogan played his first game for Kent.

13–16 April	Warwickshire (H)	v	Kent	Warwickshire won by an innings and 15 runs
Scorecard	453/4d (107 overs); Sam Hain 165* (269); Joe Denly 1/49 (13 overs)		158 (47.1 overs); Daniel Bell-Drummond 40 (65); Hasan Ali 3/36 (9.1 overs)	Edgbaston, Birmingham; Umpires: Richard Illingworth and Martin Saggers
Scorecard			281 (93.3 overs) (f/o); Joey Evison 99 (161); Chris Rushworth 3/58 (21 overs)	Edgbaston, Birmingham; Umpires: Richard Illingworth and Martin Saggers
Kent won the toss and chose to field.; No play was possible on day two due to rain.; Points: Warwickshire 24, Kent 1

20–23 April	Essex	v	Kent (H)	Match drawn
Scorecard	451/5d (97.4 overs); Nick Browne 159 (299); Wes Agar 2/67 (23 overs)		342/7 (78 overs); Zak Crawley 170 (183); Simon Harmer 4/141 (31 overs)	St Lawrence Ground, Canterbury; Umpires: Nigel Llong and David Millns
Essex won the toss and chose to bat.; No play was possible on day four due to rain; Points: Kent 8, Essex 12; Wes Agar made his Kent debut.

27–30 April	Kent	v	Middlesex (H)	Middlesex won by 9 wickets
Scorecard	186 (65.2 overs); Ben Compton 52 (168); Tim Murtagh 4/40 (17 overs)		229 (58.1 overs); Ryan Higgins 71 (108); Wes Agar 4/60 (15.1 overs)	Lord's, London; Umpires: Rob Bailey and Steve O'Shaughnessy
Scorecard	128 (57 overs); Jack Leaning 48 (118); Tim Murtagh 6/42 (16 overs)		86/1 (24.3 overs); Sam Robson 41* (79); Matt Quinn 1/41 (6 overs)	Lord's, London; Umpires: Rob Bailey and Steve O'Shaughnessy
Middlesex won the toss and chose to field.; Points: Middlesex 19, Kent 3

11–14 May	Kent (H)	v	Hampshire	Match drawn
Scorecard	95 (37.4 overs); Tawanda Muyeye 28 (42); James Fuller 5/21 (8 overs)		373 (104.5 overs); Liam Dawson 84 (153); Joey Evison 3/86 (20.5 overs)	St Lawrence Ground, Canterbury; Umpires: Paul Pollard and Martin Saggers
Scorecard	259/4 (113 overs); Jack Leaning 68* (206); Liam Dawson 2/31 (18 overs)			St Lawrence Ground, Canterbury; Umpires: Paul Pollard and Martin Saggers
Hampshire won the toss and chose to field.; Only 4.1 overs were possible on day 2 due to rain.; Points: Kent 8, Hampshire 11

18–21 May	Kent	v	Surrey (H)	Surrey won by 10 wickets
Scorecard	278 (72.3 overs); Joey Evison 77* (106); Tom Lawes 3/41 (9.3 overs)		362 (92.3 overs); Sean Abbott 78 (88); Arafat Bhuiyan 4/65 (20 overs)	The Oval, London; Umpires: Rob Bailey and Nigel Llong
Scorecard	141 (37.4 overs); Tawanda Muyeye 42 (41); Tom Lawes 5/22 (9 overs)		58/0 (11.3 overs); Rory Burns 36* (36)	The Oval, London; Umpires: Rob Bailey and Nigel Llong
Surrey won the toss and chose to field.; Points: Surrey 22, Kent 2; Arafat Bhuiyan made his first-class debut.

11–14 June	Kent (H)	v	Surrey	Surrey won by 5 wickets
Scorecard	301 (82.2 overs); Jordan Cox 133 (198); Sean Abbott 4/52 (17 overs)		145 (43.2 overs); Sean Abbott 34 (37); Matt Quinn 3/22 (12 overs)	St Lawrence Ground, Canterbury; Umpires: James Middlebrook and Russell Warren
Scorecard	344 (81 overs); Tawanda Muyeye 79 (120); Jordan Clark 5/79 (17 overs)		501/5 (146.5 overs); Dom Sibley 140* (415); Arshdeep Singh 2/90 (30 overs)	St Lawrence Ground, Canterbury; Umpires: James Middlebrook and Russell Warren
Kent won the toss and chose to bat.; Points: Kent 5, Surrey 19; Arshdeep Singh played his first game for Kent.

25–28 June	Northamptonshire (H)	v	Kent	Kent won by an innings and 15 runs
Scorecard	237 (64.2 overs); Rob Keogh 97 (147); Wes Agar 5/63 (15 overs)		621 (143.5 overs); Daniel Bell-Drummond 300* (439); Alex Russell 6/175 (37.5 overs)	County Ground, Northampton; Umpires: Rob Bailey and Graham Lloyd
Scorecard	369 (112 overs); Jack White 59 (76); Joe Denly 4/164 (49 overs)			County Ground, Northampton; Umpires: Rob Bailey and Graham Lloyd
Northamptonshire won the toss and chose to bat.; Points: Northamptonshire 1, Kent 24; Tawanda Muyeye (179) scored his first century in first-class cricket.

10–12 July	Kent (H)	v	Warwickshire	Warwickshire won by an innings and 46 runs
Scorecard	171 (40.5 overs); Grant Stewart 50 (45); Oliver Hannon-Dalby 4/56 (14.5 overs)		549/7d (133 overs); Rob Yates 228* (421); Jack Leaning 2/70 (14 overs)	St Lawrence Ground, Canterbury; Umpires: Ian Blackwell and Mark Newell
Scorecard	332 (100.2 overs); Harry Finch 67 (167); Oliver Hannon-Dalby 4/59 (22.2 overs)			St Lawrence Ground, Canterbury; Umpires: Ian Blackwell and Mark Newell
Kent won the toss and chose to bat.; Points: Kent 2, Warwickshire 23

19–22 July	Kent	v	Essex (H)	Essex won by 7 wickets
Scorecard	207 (59 overs); Ben Compton 47 (81); Sam Cook 3/19 (11 overs)		458/8d (126 overs); Matt Critchley 117 (168); Arshdeep Singh 3/58 (23 overs)	County Ground, Chelmsford; Umpires: Rob Bailey and Graham Lloyd
Scorecard	280 (111.1 overs); Harry Finch 114 (228); Sam Cook 4/46 (21 overs)		30/3 (3.5 overs); Adam Rossington 14 (8); Hamidullah Qadri 2/19 (2 overs)	County Ground, Chelmsford; Umpires: Rob Bailey and Graham Lloyd
Kent won the toss and chose to bat.; Points: Essex 21, Kent 2

25–28 July	Nottinghamshire (H)	v	Kent	Nottinghamshire won by 10 wickets
Scorecard	350 (107 overs); Ben Slater 100 (155); Jas Singh 4/87 (18 overs)		314 (41 overs); Harry Finch 73 (93); Calvin Harrison 4/28 (7 overs)	Trent Bridge, Nottingham; Umpires: Peter Hartley and Neil Mallender
Scorecard	372/6 (63 overs); Will Young 87 (79); Jas Singh 2/72 (12 overs)		85 (21.3 overs); Jack Leaning 21 (21); Dane Paterson 5/41 (10 overs)	Trent Bridge, Nottingham; Umpires: Peter Hartley and Neil Mallender
Kent won the toss and elected to field.; Points: Nottinghamshire 22, Kent 5; Toby Albert and Ben Geddes both played their first game for Kent.

10–13 September	Kent (H)	v	Nottinghamshire	Match drawn
Scorecard	446 (115.4 overs); Zak Crawley 158 (153); Lyndon James 2/30 (11 overs)		265 (98.2 overs); Steven Mullaney 86 (141); Aron Nijjar 4/67 (32)	St Lawrence Ground, Canterbury; Umpires: Mike Burns and Paul Pollard
Scorecard	86/6 (31.3 overs); Tawanda Muyeye 28 (27); Asitha Fernando 3/40 (10 overs)		348 (123 overs) (f/o); Joe Clarke 141* (277); Michael Hogan 5/63 (22 overs)	St Lawrence Ground, Canterbury; Umpires: Mike Burns and Paul Pollard
Kent won the toss and chose to bat.; Points: Kent 12, Nottinghamshire 8; Yuzvendra Chahal and Aron Nijjar played their first games for Kent.

19–22 September	Somerset (H)	v	Kent	Match drawn
Scorecard	404/4d (86 overs); Lewis Goldsworthy 122 (203); Jack Leaning 1/34 (6 overs)		235 (55 overs); Joe Denly 73 (119); Tom Abell 4/54 (11 overs)	County Ground, Taunton; Umpires: Tom Lungley and Martin Saggers
Scorecard			44/2 (15 overs) (f/o); Tawanda Muyeye 24 (37); Neil Wagner 1/1 (3 overs)	County Ground, Taunton; Umpires: Tom Lungley and Martin Saggers
Kent won the toss and chose to field.; Points: Somerset 12, Kent 6

26–29 September	Lancashire	v	Kent (H)	Match drawn
Scorecard	327 (96 overs); Josh Bohannon 113 (167); Aron Nijjar 3/70 (23 overs)		494 (135.1 overs); Joe Denly 136 (200); George Balderson 4/69 (21 overs)	St Lawrence Ground, Canterbury; Umpires: James Middlebrook and Rob White
Scorecard	390/8d (122 overs); Luke Wells 117 (195); Jack Leaning 3/64 (20 overs)			St Lawrence Ground, Canterbury; Umpires: James Middlebrook and Rob White
Lancashire won the toss and chose to bat.; Points: Kent 12, Lancashire 9

== One-Day Cup ==
=== Group A ===
Pos	Team	Pld	W	L	T	NR	Ded	Pts	NRR	
1	Leicestershire	8	7	1	0	0	0	14	1.302	Advanced to the semi-finals
2	Hampshire	8	7	1	0	0	0	14	1.048	Advanced to the quarter-finals
3	Lancashire	8	4	2	0	2	0	10	0.827	Advanced to the quarter-finals
4	Kent	8	4	4	0	0	0	8	−0.331	
5	Nottinghamshire	8	3	4	0	1	0	7	−0.274	
6	Yorkshire	8	2	4	0	2	0	6	−1.051	
7	Middlesex	8	2	5	0	1	0	5	−0.104	
8	Surrey	8	2	5	0	1	0	5	−1.250	
9	Essex	8	1	6	0	1	0	3	−0.774	

Source: ESPNcricinfo

1 August	Kent; 282/9 (50 overs)	v	Yorkshire (H); 117/4 (17 overs)	Kent won by 2 runs (DLS method)
Scorecard	Kent; 282/9 (50 overs)	v	Yorkshire (H); 117/4 (17 overs)	North Marine Road Ground, Scarborough; Umpires: Neil Mallender and Surendiran Shanmugam
Scorecard	Joey Evison 136 (106); Ben Coad 3/16 (10 overs)		George Hill 35 (18); James Bazley 2/20 (5 overs)	North Marine Road Ground, Scarborough; Umpires: Neil Mallender and Surendiran Shanmugam
Yorkshire won the toss and chose to field.; Yorkshire were set a revised target of 120 runs to win from 17 overs due to rain.; James Bazley and Matt Parkinson both played their first game for Kent.				North Marine Road Ground, Scarborough; Umpires: Neil Mallender and Surendiran Shanmugam

6 August	Leicestershire; 380/5 (50 overs)	v	Kent (H); 116 (23.5 overs)	Leicestershire won by 264 runs
Scorecard	Leicestershire; 380/5 (50 overs)	v	Kent (H); 116 (23.5 overs)	County Cricket Ground, Beckenham; Umpires: Anna Harris and Rob White
Scorecard	Peter Handscomb 87 (67); Matt Parkinson 2/64 (10 overs)		Jack Leaning 25 (23); Roman Walker 6/43 (6.5 overs)	County Cricket Ground, Beckenham; Umpires: Anna Harris and Rob White
Kent won the toss and chose to field.				County Cricket Ground, Beckenham; Umpires: Anna Harris and Rob White

9 August	Lancashire (H); 328/5 (50 overs)	v	Kent; 203 (39.4 overs)	Lancashire won by 125 runs
Scorecard	Lancashire (H); 328/5 (50 overs)	v	Kent; 203 (39.4 overs)	Stanley Park, Blackpool; Umpires: Neil Mallender and Steve O'Shaughnessy
Scorecard	Josh Bohannon 105 (117); Jas Singh 3/74 (10 overs)		Daniel Bell-Drummond 38 (54); Jack Blatherwick 4/52 (10 overs)	Stanley Park, Blackpool; Umpires: Neil Mallender and Steve O'Shaughnessy
Kent won the toss and chose to field.; Jas Singh made his List A debut.				Stanley Park, Blackpool; Umpires: Neil Mallender and Steve O'Shaughnessy

11 August	Kent; 330/6 (50 overs)	v	Surrey (H); 243 (43.1 overs)	Kent won by 87 runs
Scorecard	Kent; 330/6 (50 overs)	v	Surrey (H); 243 (43.1 overs)	The Oval, London; Umpires: Neil Bainton and Nigel Llong
Scorecard	Jack Leaning 87 (94); Jordan Clark 2/54 (8 overs)		Ryan Patel 68 (67); Matt Parkinson 4/43 (9 overs)	The Oval, London; Umpires: Neil Bainton and Nigel Llong
Kent won the toss and chose to bat.; Jaydn Denly made his List A debut.				The Oval, London; Umpires: Neil Bainton and Nigel Llong

13 August	Kent (H); 288 (49.2 overs)	v	Middlesex; 155 (36.4 overs)	Kent won by 133 runs
Scorecard	Kent (H); 288 (49.2 overs)	v	Middlesex; 155 (36.4 overs)	County Cricket Ground, Beckenham; Umpires: Ben Debenham and James Tredwell
Scorecard	Jack Leaning 68 (68); Ryan Higgins 4/33 (10 overs)		John Simpson 39 (51); Jas Singh 2/17 (5 overs)	County Cricket Ground, Beckenham; Umpires: Ben Debenham and James Tredwell
Kent won the toss and chose to bat.				County Cricket Ground, Beckenham; Umpires: Ben Debenham and James Tredwell

17 August	Kent (H); 259/9 (50 overs)	v	Nottinghamshire; 263/9 (49.5 overs)	Nottinghamshire won by 1 wicket
Scorecard	Kent (H); 259/9 (50 overs)	v	Nottinghamshire; 263/9 (49.5 overs)	St Lawrence Ground, Canterbury; Umpires: Paul Pollard and Mansoor Qureshi
Scorecard	Daniel Bell-Drummond 79 (89); Lyndon James 4/45 (10 overs)		Matt Montgomery 92* (84); Hamidullah Qadri 4/47 (10 overs)	St Lawrence Ground, Canterbury; Umpires: Paul Pollard and Mansoor Qureshi
Kent won the toss and chose to bat.				St Lawrence Ground, Canterbury; Umpires: Paul Pollard and Mansoor Qureshi

20 August	Kent (H); 287/8 (50 overs)	v	Essex; 227 (44.5 overs)	Kent won by 60 runs
Scorecard	Kent (H); 287/8 (50 overs)	v	Essex; 227 (44.5 overs)	St Lawrence Ground, Canterbury; Umpires: Sam Hollingshead and Sue Redfern
Scorecard	Jack Leaning 137* (127); Beau Webster 3/38 (7 overs)		William Buttleman 50* (51); Gramt Stewart 2/25 (5.5 overs)	St Lawrence Ground, Canterbury; Umpires: Sam Hollingshead and Sue Redfern
Kent won the toss and chose to bat.				St Lawrence Ground, Canterbury; Umpires: Sam Hollingshead and Sue Redfern

22 August	Kent; 325/8 (50 overs)	v	Hampshire (H); 326/7 (48.3 overs)	Hampshire won by 3 wickets
Scorecard	Kent; 325/8 (50 overs)	v	Hampshire (H); 326/7 (48.3 overs)	Newclose County Cricket Ground, Newport; Umpires: Mark Newell and Ben Peverall
Scorecard	Daniel Bell-Drummond 150 (133); Ian Holland 3/45 (10 overs)		Aneurin Donald 106 (73); Matt Parkinson 4/69 (10 overs)	Newclose County Cricket Ground, Newport; Umpires: Mark Newell and Ben Peverall
Kent won the toss and chose to bat.				Newclose County Cricket Ground, Newport; Umpires: Mark Newell and Ben Peverall

== T20 Blast ==
=== South Group ===
Pos	Team	Pld	W	L	T	NR	Pts	NRR	
1	Somerset	14	12	2	0	0	24	1.460	Advanced to the quarter-finals
2	Hampshire Hawks	14	9	5	0	0	18	0.820	Advanced to the quarter-finals
3	Surrey	14	8	6	0	0	16	1.192	Advanced to the quarter-finals
4	Essex Eagles	14	8	6	0	0	16	0.088	Advanced to the quarter-finals
5	Kent Spitfires	14	7	7	0	0	14	0.287	
6	Sussex Sharks	14	6	8	0	0	12	−0.871	
7	Gloucestershire	14	5	9	0	0	10	−0.993	
8	Glamorgan	14	5	9	0	0	10	−1.060	
9	Middlesex	14	3	11	0	0	6	−0.932	

Source: Cricinfo

24 May	Gloucestershire; 113 (16.3 overs)	v	Kent (H); 116/3 (13.3 overs)	Kent won by 7 wickets
Scorecard	Gloucestershire; 113 (16.3 overs)	v	Kent (H); 116/3 (13.3 overs)	St Lawrence Ground, Canterbury; Umpires: Ben Debenham and Martin Saggers
Scorecard	Chris Dent 55 (29); Michael Hogan 3/13 (3 overs)		Jordan Cox 39* (17); Tom Smith 3/22 (4 overs)	St Lawrence Ground, Canterbury; Umpires: Ben Debenham and Martin Saggers
Gloucestershire won the toss and chose to bat.; Kane Richardson played his first game for Kent.				St Lawrence Ground, Canterbury; Umpires: Ben Debenham and Martin Saggers

26 May	Surrey (H); 223/5 (20 overs)	v	Kent; 182/7 (20 overs)	Surrey won by 41 runs
Scorecard	Surrey (H); 223/5 (20 overs)	v	Kent; 182/7 (20 overs)	The Oval, London; Umpires: Rob Bailey and Martin Saggers; Player of the match: Sean Abbott (Surrey)
Scorecard	Sean Abbott 110* (41); Grant Stewart 1/29 (4 overs)		Tawanda Muyeye 59 (37); Will Jacks 2/7 (1 over)	The Oval, London; Umpires: Rob Bailey and Martin Saggers; Player of the match: Sean Abbott (Surrey)
Kent won the toss and chose to field.				The Oval, London; Umpires: Rob Bailey and Martin Saggers; Player of the match: Sean Abbott (Surrey)

30 May	Somerset; 154 (20 overs)	v	Kent (H); 112 (15 overs)	Somerset won by 13 runs (DLS method)
Scorecard	Somerset; 154 (20 overs)	v	Kent (H); 112 (15 overs)	St Lawrence Ground, Canterbury; Umpires: Neil Bainton and Paul Baldwin
Scorecard	Tom Lammonby 34 (31); Wes Agar 3/18 (4 overs)		Sam Billings 29 (27); Ben Green 3/19 (2 overs)	St Lawrence Ground, Canterbury; Umpires: Neil Bainton and Paul Baldwin
Kent won the toss and chose to field.; Kent were set a revised target of 126 runs in 15 overs.				St Lawrence Ground, Canterbury; Umpires: Neil Bainton and Paul Baldwin

2 June	Kent; 189/6 (20 overs)	v	Glamorgan (H); 191/3 (17 overs)	Glamorgan won by 7 wickets
Scorecard	Kent; 189/6 (20 overs)	v	Glamorgan (H); 191/3 (17 overs)	Sophia Gardens, Cardiff; Umpires: Jack Shantry and Rob White
Scorecard	Tawanda Muyeye 62 (38); Peter Hatzoglou 2/25 (4 overs)		Colin Ingram 63* (32); Grant Stewart 2/51 (3 overs)	Sophia Gardens, Cardiff; Umpires: Jack Shantry and Rob White
Glamorgan won the toss and chose to field.				Sophia Gardens, Cardiff; Umpires: Jack Shantry and Rob White

4 June	Kent (H); 173/5 (20 overs)	v	Surrey; 174/5 (20 overs)	Surrey won by 5 wickets
Scorecard	Kent (H); 173/5 (20 overs)	v	Surrey; 174/5 (20 overs)	St Lawrence Ground, Canterbury; Umpires: Neil Bainton and Nigel Llong
Scorecard	Jack Leaning 34* (22); Will Jacks 3/28 (4 overs)		Laurie Evans 52 (36); George Linde 2/28 (4 overs)	St Lawrence Ground, Canterbury; Umpires: Neil Bainton and Nigel Llong
Kent won the toss and chose to bat.				St Lawrence Ground, Canterbury; Umpires: Neil Bainton and Nigel Llong

7 June	Kent (H); 150/8 (20 overs)	v	Essex; 155/6 (18.2 overs)	Essex won by 4 wickets
Scorecard	Kent (H); 150/8 (20 overs)	v	Essex; 155/6 (18.2 overs)	St Lawrence Ground, Canterbury; Umpires: Ben Debenham and Nigel Llong; Player of the match: Sam Cook (Essex)
Scorecard	Joe Denly 39 (39); Sam Cook 4/18 (4 overs)		Matt Critchley 63* (46); Michael Hogan 2/38 (4 overs)	St Lawrence Ground, Canterbury; Umpires: Ben Debenham and Nigel Llong; Player of the match: Sam Cook (Essex)
Kent won the toss and chose to bat.				St Lawrence Ground, Canterbury; Umpires: Ben Debenham and Nigel Llong; Player of the match: Sam Cook (Essex)

9 June	Hampshire; 177/7 (20 overs)	v	Kent (H); 180/4 (19.3 overs)	Kent won by 6 wickets
Scorecard	Hampshire; 177/7 (20 overs)	v	Kent (H); 180/4 (19.3 overs)	St Lawrence Ground, Canterbury; Umpires: Nigel Llong and Billy Taylor
Scorecard	Joe Weatherley 67 (50); Fred Klaassen 2/31 (4 overs)		Daniel Bell-Drummond 89 (55); Nathan Ellis 2/29 (4 overs)	St Lawrence Ground, Canterbury; Umpires: Nigel Llong and Billy Taylor
Kent won the toss and chose to field.				St Lawrence Ground, Canterbury; Umpires: Nigel Llong and Billy Taylor

16 June	Kent; 228/3 (20 overs)	v	Middlesex (H); 215/7 (20 overs)	Kent won by 13 runs
Scorecard	Kent; 228/3 (20 overs)	v	Middlesex (H); 215/7 (20 overs)	Lord's, London; Umpires: Neil Bainton and Rob White
Scorecard	Joe Denly 73* (37); Blake Cullen 2/36 (3.2 overs)		Max Holden 121* (59); Fred Klaassen 2/34 (4 overs)	Lord's, London; Umpires: Neil Bainton and Rob White
Kent won the toss and chose to bat.				Lord's, London; Umpires: Neil Bainton and Rob White

17 June	Gloucestershire (H); 137 (19.3 overs)	v	Kent; 138/3 (17 overs)	Kent won by 7 wickets
Scorecard	Gloucestershire (H); 137 (19.3 overs)	v	Kent; 138/3 (17 overs)	Bristol County Ground, Bristol; Umpires: Tom Lungley and Russell Warren; Player of the match: Jordan Cox (Kent)
Scorecard	Miles Hammond 30 (20); Jack Leaning 2/16 (4 overs)		Daniel Bell-Drummond 56* (49); Tom Price 1/29 (3 overs)	Bristol County Ground, Bristol; Umpires: Tom Lungley and Russell Warren; Player of the match: Jordan Cox (Kent)
Kent won the toss and chose to field.				Bristol County Ground, Bristol; Umpires: Tom Lungley and Russell Warren; Player of the match: Jordan Cox (Kent)

20 June	Sussex (H); 169/7 (20 overs)	v	Kent; 172/4 (18.4 overs)	Kent won by 6 wickets
Scorecard	Sussex (H); 169/7 (20 overs)	v	Kent; 172/4 (18.4 overs)	County Ground, Hove; Umpires: Ian Blackwell and Mark Newell
Scorecard	Ravi Bopara 53 (39); Michael Hogan 4/31 (4 overs)		Jordan Cox 82* (44); Aristides Karvelas 2/36 (3.4 overs)	County Ground, Hove; Umpires: Ian Blackwell and Mark Newell
Sussex won the toss and chose to bat.				County Ground, Hove; Umpires: Ian Blackwell and Mark Newell

22 June	Essex (H); 184 (19.5 overs)	v	Kent; 190/3 (18.2 overs)	Kent won by 7 wickets
Scorecard	Essex (H); 184 (19.5 overs)	v	Kent; 190/3 (18.2 overs)	County Ground, Chelmsford; Umpires: Rob Bailey and Ben Debenham
Scorecard	Dan Lawrence 52 (36); Michael Hogan 2/29 (2.5 overs)		Joe Denly 76 (32); Shane Snater 2/28 (3 overs)	County Ground, Chelmsford; Umpires: Rob Bailey and Ben Debenham
Kent won the toss and chose to field.				County Ground, Chelmsford; Umpires: Rob Bailey and Ben Debenham

23 June	Kent (H); 228/3 (20 overs)	v	Middlesex; 173 (19 overs)	Kent won by 55 runs
Scorecard	Kent (H); 228/3 (20 overs)	v	Middlesex; 173 (19 overs)	St Lawrence Ground, Canterbury; Umpires: Ben Debenham and Nigel Llong
Scorecard	Daniel Bell-Drummond 111 (58); Josh de Caires 1/27 (3 overs)		Luke Hollman 48 (20); George Linde 3/21 (3 overs)	St Lawrence Ground, Canterbury; Umpires: Ben Debenham and Nigel Llong
Middlesex won the toss and chose to field.; Grant Stewart took a hat-trick.				St Lawrence Ground, Canterbury; Umpires: Ben Debenham and Nigel Llong

30 June	Sussex; 228/7 (20 overs)	v	Kent (H); 117/4 (10 overs)	Sussex won by 11 runs (DLS method)
Scorecard	Sussex; 228/7 (20 overs)	v	Kent (H); 117/4 (10 overs)	St Lawrence Ground, Canterbury; Umpires: Neil Bainton and Nigel Llong
Scorecard	Ravi Bopara 108 (53); Matt Quinn 2/43 (4 overs)		Jordan Cox 37* (16); Aristides Karvelas 1/22 (2 overs)	St Lawrence Ground, Canterbury; Umpires: Neil Bainton and Nigel Llong
Kent won the toss and elected to field.; Kent were set a revised target of 129 runs in 10 overs.				St Lawrence Ground, Canterbury; Umpires: Neil Bainton and Nigel Llong

2 July	Somerset (H); 221/7 (20 overs)	v	Kent; 206/7 (20 overs)	Somerset won by 15 runs
Scorecard	Somerset (H); 221/7 (20 overs)	v	Kent; 206/7 (20 overs)	County Ground, Taunton; Umpires: Ben Debenham and Ian Blackwell; Player of the match: Lewis Gregory (Somerset)
Scorecard	Will Smeed 61 (28); Grant Stewart 4/48 (4 overs)		Joey Evison 46 (24); Lewis Gregory 2/33 (4 overs)	County Ground, Taunton; Umpires: Ben Debenham and Ian Blackwell; Player of the match: Lewis Gregory (Somerset)
Kent won the toss and chose to field.				County Ground, Taunton; Umpires: Ben Debenham and Ian Blackwell; Player of the match: Lewis Gregory (Somerset)
