= Kent County Cricket Club in 2022 =

2022 season of an English cricket team

Kent County Cricket Club
2022 season
- Coach: (England) Matthew Walker
- Captain: (England) Sam Billings
- Overseas players: (South Africa) George Linde (Australia) Jackson Bird (New Zealand) Jacob Duffy (India) Navdeep Saini (New Zealand) Matt Henry (Afghanistan) Qais Ahmad (T20 only)
- Ground(s): St Lawrence Ground, Canterbury; County Ground, Beckenham
- County Championship: 5th, Division One
- One-Day Cup: Winners
- T20 Blast: 9th, South Group

In 2022, Kent County Cricket Club competed in the 2022 County Championship, the 2022 One-Day Cup and the 2022 T20 Blast. The season was the sixth in charge for head coach, and former player, Matthew Walker. Sam Billings retained the club captaincy that he was first awarded in 2018. Daniel Bell-Drummond and Jack Leaning was named as vice-captains for limited overs and first-class matches, respectively.

Michael Yardy left his position as batting coach in November 2021 to return to his former county Sussex. The following month, Kent announced that former Netherlands international Ryan ten Doeschate would join the county as the new batting coach.

On 17 September 2022, Kent defeated Lancashire by 21 runs in the final at Trent Bridge to win the 2022 One-Day Cup. The victory ended a run of eight consecutive defeats in List A finals going back to their last title in 1978.

== Squad ==
=== Departures ===
South African batsman Heino Kuhn left the club at the end of the 2021 season after four seasons with Kent.

On 20 April 2022, Grant Stewart signed a short-term loan deal with Sussex. Stewart was recalled by Kent after just one game, due to an injury sustained by Jackson Bird. On 23 May 2022, Ollie Robinson joined Durham on loan for the T20 Blast.

On 29 July 2022, Matt Milnes signed a contract to join Yorkshire at the end of the season. In August it was announced that Darren Stevens would be released at the end of the season after 17 years with Kent. Stevens played over 630 games for Kent, scored more than 28,000 runs and took almost 900 wickets. In 2021, at the age of 44, Stevens was named as one of the five Wisden cricketers of the year, making him the oldest person to be named in the list for 88 years.

On 23 September 2022, the club announced that wicketkeeper-batsman Ollie Robinson would be leaving the club at the end of the season to join Durham.

=== Arrivals ===
In October 2021, teenage bowler Jas Singh signed his first full-time contract after making his first-class debut in 2021. The same month, opening batsman Ben Compton joined Kent on a two-year contract after being released by Nottinghamshire.

In November 2021, New Zealand fast bowler Matt Henry rejoined the county after previously featuring during the 2018 season. Henry arrived at the club in July 2022 and was available for the One-Day Cup and the second half of the County Championship. In December 2021, Kent announced that Afghan spinner Qais Ahmad would return to represent the county in the T20 Blast for a second season.

In January 2022, South African international all-rounder George Linde signed on a two-year deal. In February 2022, Kent announced another overseas player, with Australia fast bowler Jackson Bird signing a short-term deal making him available at the start of the season for up to six matches in the County Championship. Bird's spell was cut short after he sustained a shoulder injury. On 7 June 2002, following injuries to other bowlers in the squad, Kent signed New Zealand seamer Jacob Duffy for a short spell. Duffy would be available for two County Championship matches. On 24 June 2022, Kent announced the signing of bowler Toby Pettman on loan from Nottinghamshire for the County Championship game against Surrey. In July, Indian fast bowler Navdeep Saini was announced as another short-term overseas player, replacing Duffy, to play up to three Championship matches and five One-Day Cup games. Saini's contract was later extended for the duration of the One-Day Cup after Matt Henry was called up to the New Zealand squad, meaning that Henry would only be available for the first game of the tournament.

On 30 July 2022, Kent signed 20 year-old Joey Evison from Nottinghamshire, initially on loan for the One-Day Cup before joining on a three-year contract from the start of the 2023 season. On 10 August 2022, batsman Harry Finch re-joined Kent for the remainder of the One-Day Cup as cover for a number of players absent due to injuries and The Hundred. Finch previously had a short-term deal with the county during the 2021 season when the squad had been severely affected by COVID-19. In October 2022, Finch signed a two-year contract to run until the end of the 2024 season.

On 16 September, with several players unavailable due to injuries and a first England call-up for Jordan Cox, Kent signed bowler Connor McKerr on loan from Surrey for the remaining two games of the season.

=== Squad list ===
- Ages given as of the first day of the County Championship, 7 April 2022.

No.	Name	Nationality	Birth date	Batting style	Bowling style	Notes
Batsmen
2	Ben Compton	England	29 March 1994 (aged 28)	Left-handed	Right-arm off break	
6	Joe Denly	England	16 March 1986 (aged 36)	Right-handed	Right-arm leg break	
10	Alex Blake	England	25 January 1989 (aged 33)	Left-handed	Right-arm off break	White-ball contract only
14	Tawanda Muyeye	Zimbabwe	5 March 2001 (aged 21)	Right-handed	Right-arm off break	Qualifies as a domestic player
16	Zak Crawley	England	3 February 1998 (aged 24)	Right-handed	Right-arm medium	
23	Daniel Bell-Drummond	England	3 August 1993 (aged 28)	Right-handed	Right-arm medium	Vice-captain
34	Jack Leaning	England	18 October 1993 (aged 28)	Right-handed	Right-arm medium/off break	Vice-captain
72	Harry Finch	England	10 February 1995 (aged 27)	Right-handed	Right-arm medium-fast	Signed in August 2022
All-rounders
3	Darren Stevens	England	30 April 1976 (aged 45)	Right-handed	Right arm medium	
9	Grant Stewart	Italy	19 February 1994 (aged 28)	Right-handed	Right-arm medium	EU passport
27	George Linde	South Africa	4 December 1991 (aged 30)	Left-handed	Slow left-arm orthodox	Overseas player
33	Joey Evison	England	14 November 2001 (aged 20)	Right-handed	Right arm medium	On loan from Nottinghamshire
55	Marcus O'Riordan	England	25 January 1998 (aged 24)	Right-handed	Right-arm off break	
Wicket-keepers
7	Sam Billings	England	15 June 1991 (aged 30)	Right-handed	—	Club captain
21	Ollie Robinson	England	1 December 1998 (aged 23)	Right-handed	—	
22	Jordan Cox	England	21 October 2000 (aged 21)	Right-handed	—	
Bowlers
1	Harry Podmore	England	23 July 1994 (aged 27)	Right-handed	Right-arm medium	
8	Matt Milnes	England	29 July 1994 (aged 27)	Right-handed	Right-arm medium-fast	
11	James Logan	England	12 October 1997 (aged 24)	Left-handed	Slow left-arm orthodox	
17	Nathan Gilchrist	South Africa	11 June 2000 (aged 21)	Left-handed	Right-arm fast-medium	UK passport
18	Fred Klaassen	Netherlands	13 November 1992 (aged 29)	Right-handed	Left-arm medium-fast	
19	Jas Singh	England	19 September 2002 (aged 19)	Right-handed	Right-arm fast-medium	
24	Matt Henry	New Zealand	14 December 1991 (aged 30)	Right-handed	Right-arm fast-medium	Overseas player (second half of the season)
32	Qais Ahmad	Afghanistan	15 August 2000 (aged 21)	Right-handed	Right-arm leg break	Overseas player; T20 Blast only
33	Jackson Bird	Australia	11 December 1986 (aged 35)	Right-handed	Right-arm fast-medium	Overseas player (early season)
64	Matt Quinn	New Zealand	28 February 1993 (aged 29)	Right-handed	Right-arm medium-fast	UK passport
75	Hamidullah Qadri	England	5 January 2000 (aged 22)	Right-handed	Right-arm off break	
96	Navdeep Saini	India	23 November 1992 (aged 29)	Right-handed	Right-arm fast	Overseas player (July–August)
99	Jacob Duffy	New Zealand	2 August 1994 (aged 27)	Right-handed	Right-arm fast-medium	Overseas player (June)
–	Toby Pettman	England	11 May 1998 (aged 23)	Right-handed	Right-arm medium	On loan from Nottinghamshire (June)
–	Connor McKerr	South Africa	19 January 1998 (aged 24)	Right-handed	Right-arm fast	On loan from Surrey (September)

== County Championship ==
The County Championship will return to the two division format last used in the 2019 season. The teams were placed into the division they had qualified to following the result of the 2019 County Championship, after the 2020 season was cancelled due to the COVID-19 pandemic.

=== Division One ===
Pos	Team	Pld	W	L	T	D	Bat	Bowl	Ded	Pts
1	Surrey	14	8	1	0	5	48	34	0	250
2	Lancashire	14	7	1	0	6	32	39	6	225
3	Hampshire	14	9	4	0	1	37	37	2	224
4	Essex	14	7	3	0	4	24	34	0	202
5	Kent	14	4	5	0	5	30	27	3	158
6	Northamptonshire	14	2	5	0	7	31	35	0	154
7	Somerset	14	3	6	0	5	28	33	0	149
8	Warwickshire	14	2	6	0	6	26	36	1	141
9	Yorkshire	14	1	6	0	7	33	35	2	138
10	Gloucestershire	14	2	8	0	4	26	29	5	114

Source: ESPN Cricinfo

Relegated to the Division Two.

7–10 April	Essex (H)	v	Kent	Match drawn
Scorecard	514 (158.5 overs); MJJ Critchley 132 (179); JM Bird 3/85 (28 overs)		581 (187.3 overs); BG Compton 129 (289); JM Cox 129 (332); MJJ Critchley 4/114 (46 overs)	County Ground, Chelmsford; Umpires: NGB Cook and PR Pollard
Scorecard	68/1d (22 overs); T Westley 32* (51); NN Gilchrist 1/6 (4 overs)			County Ground, Chelmsford; Umpires: NGB Cook and PR Pollard
Kent won the toss and chose to field.; Points: Essex 12, Kent 12; JM Bird and BG Compton both played their first game for Kent.

14–17 April	Lancashire	v	Kent (H)	Lancashire won by 10 wickets
Scorecard	506 (137 overs); SJ Croft 155 (336); Hamidullah Qadri 6/129 (37 overs)		260 (97.3 overs); BG Compton 104* (289); MW Parkinson 4/66 (31 overs)	St Lawrence Ground, Canterbury; Umpires: NL Bainton and MJ Saggers
Scorecard	36/0 (7.1 overs); George Balderson 23* (23)		279 (123.2 overs) (f/o); BG Compton 115 (340); Hasan Ali 3/36 (21 overs)	St Lawrence Ground, Canterbury; Umpires: NL Bainton and MJ Saggers
Lancashire won the toss and chose to bat.; Points: Kent 3, Lancashire 24

21–24 April	Kent (H)	v	Hampshire	Hampshire won by an innings and 51 runs
Scorecard	305 (106.2 overs); DJ Bell-Drummond 149 (231); KHD Barker 6/53 (24 overs)		652/6d (147 overs); LA Dawson 171 (268); NN Gilchrist 3/124 (29 overs)	St Lawrence Ground, Canterbury; Umpires: RJ Bailey and M Newell
Scorecard	296 (95 overs); BG Compton 89 (194); KJ Abbott 5/29 (16 overs)			St Lawrence Ground, Canterbury; Umpires: RJ Bailey and M Newell
Kent won the toss and chose to bat.; Points: Kent 4, Hampshire 24

28 April – 1 May	Kent	v	Yorkshire (H)	Match drawn
Scorecard	291 (86.4 overs); DJ Bell-Drummond 109 (194); Haris Rauf 5/65 (14 overs)		571 (138.4 overs); HC Brook 194 (265); NN Gilchrist 3/114 (22 overs)	Headingley, Leeds; Umpires: GD Lloyd and SJ O'Shaughnessy
Scorecard	393 (122.3 overs); BG Compton 93 (220); SA Patterson 5/54 (29.3 overs)			Headingley, Leeds; Umpires: GD Lloyd and SJ O'Shaughnessy
Yorkshire won the toss and chose to field.; Points: Yorkshire 16, Kent 11; NN Gilchrist was dismissed for a pair, and equalled the record of six consecutive ducks in first-class cricket.

12–15 May	Surrey	v	Kent (H)	Match drawn
Scorecard	671/9d (173 overs); OJD Pope 96 (184); NN Gilchrist 3/121 (27 overs)		230 (82.5 overs); OG Robinson 71 (147); WG Jacks 4/65 (30 overs)	County Ground, Beckenham; Umpires: NL Bainton and BJ Debenham
Scorecard			114/1 (41.2 overs) (f/o); BG Compton 63* (125); WG Jacks 1/27 (12 overs)	County Ground, Beckenham; Umpires: NL Bainton and BJ Debenham
Surrey won the toss and chose to bat.; Points: Kent 10, Surrey 16

19–22 May	Kent	v	Northamptonshire (H)	Match drawn
Scorecard	519/9d (146.1 overs); BG Compton 140 (294); BW Sanderson 2/82 (28 overs)		430 (149.1 overs); LA Procter 76 (200); MR Quinn 3/82 (27 overs)	County Ground, Northampton; Umpires: T Lungley and BV Taylor
Scorecard	170/1d (48 overs); Z Crawley 84 (138); BJ Curran 1/31 (8 overs)			County Ground, Northampton; Umpires: T Lungley and BV Taylor
Northamptonshire won the toss and chose to field.; Points: Northamptonshire 12, Kent 13

12–15 June	Gloucestershire	v	Kent (H)	Kent won by 8 wickets
Scorecard	438 (110.5 overs); GD Phillips 125 (157); ME Milnes 4/93 (23 overs)		564 (163.2 overs); JM Cox 158 (264); TJ Price 5/58 (18 overs)	St Lawrence Ground, Canterbury; Umpires: NJ Llong and SJ O'Shaughnessy
Scorecard	213 (67 overs); GD Phillips 59 (134); JA Duffy 5/66 (17 overs)		91/2 (22.4 overs); BG Compton 30 (67); GD Phillips 1/8 (2.4 overs)	St Lawrence Ground, Canterbury; Umpires: NJ Llong and SJ O'Shaughnessy
Kent won the toss and chose to field.; Points: Kent 22, Gloucestershire 6; JA Duffy played his first game for Kent.

26–29 June	Surrey (H)	v	Kent	Match drawn
Scorecard	673/7d (129.2 overs); SM Curran 126 (75); THS Pettman 2/102 (22 overs)		331 (103 overs); DJ Bell-Drummond 102 (202); TE Lawes 4/51 (13 overs)	The Oval, London; Umpires: M Burns and JD Middlebrook
Scorecard			361/4 (117 overs) (f/o); DJ Bell-Drummond 107* (195); SM Curran 2/43 (15 overs)	The Oval, London; Umpires: M Burns and JD Middlebrook
Kent won the toss and chose to field.; Points: Surrey 16, Kent 12; THS Pettman played his first game for Kent.

11–14 July	Northamptonshire	v	Kent (H)	Northamptonshire won by 203 runs
Scorecard	303 (93.3 overs); EN Gay 112 (195); ME Milnes 3/47 (15 overs)		335 (109.2 overs); JM Cox 72 (174); J White 4/62 (25 overs)	St Lawrence Ground, Canterbury; Umpires: RJ Bailey and RA White
Scorecard	396/8d (100 overs); RD Rickelton 133 (257); GF Linde 3/43 (12 overs)		161 (74.5 overs); Z Crawley 35 (66); RI Keogh 5/31 (21.5 overs)	St Lawrence Ground, Canterbury; Umpires: RJ Bailey and RA White
Northamptonshire won the toss and chose to bat.; Points: Kent 6, Northamptonshire 22

19–22 July	Kent	v	Warwickshire (H)	Kent won by 177 runs
Scorecard	165 (40.1 overs); JM Cox 48 (69); OJ Hannon-Dalby 6/40 (13 overs)		225 (85.1 overs); SR Hain 99 (215); N Saini 5/72 (18 overs)	Edgbaston, Birmingham; Umpires: ID Blackwell and Michael Gough
Scorecard	384/9d (110 overs); JL Denly 141 (269); DR Briggs 3/54 (15 overs)		28/2 (8.5 overs); DP Sibley 33 (74); ME Milnes 4/11 (6.5 overs)	Edgbaston, Birmingham; Umpires: ID Blackwell and Michael Gough
Warwickshire won the toss and chose to field.; Points: Warwickshire 4, Kent 19; Navdeep Saini played his first game for Kent.; SW Billings set a record for the number of catches taken in a County Championship match (12).

25–28 July	Lancashire (H)	v	Kent	Lancashire won by 184 runs
Scorecard	145 (45.2 overs); LWP Wells 35 (80); MJ Henry 5/45 (18 overs)		270 (87 overs); JA Leaning 90 (209); TE Bailey 6/64 (23 overs)	Old Trafford, Manchester; Umpires: GD Lloyd and N Pratt
Scorecard	436/9d (118 overs); JJ Bohannon 134 (239); MJ Henry 4/82 (27 overs)		127 (52.2 overs); DJ Bell-Drummond 69* (151); TE Bailey 5/46 (16.2 overs)	Old Trafford, Manchester; Umpires: GD Lloyd and N Pratt
Kent won the toss and chose to field.; Points: Lancashire 19, Kent 5; Ollie Robinson replaced Sam Billings as a COVID-19 substitute after day one.

5–8 September	Essex	v	Kent (H)	Essex won by an innings and 260 runs
Scorecard	573 (160.2 overs); FIN Khushi 164 (228); DJ Bell-Drummond 3/37 (10 overs)		164 (50.2 overs); JM Cox 34 (55); BMJ Allison 4/40 (12 overs)	St Lawrence Ground, Canterbury; Umpires: M Burns and BJ Debenham
Scorecard			149 (62.4 overs) (f/o); JM Cox 65 (137); SJ Cook 7/33 (19 overs)	St Lawrence Ground, Canterbury; Umpires: M Burns and BJ Debenham
Kent won the toss and chose to field.; Points: Kent 1, Essex 23

20–22 September	Kent	v	Hampshire (H)	Kent won by 77 runs
Scorecard	165 (65.4 overs); BG Compton 63 (161); KJ Abbott 4/46 (14 overs)		57 (16.5 overs); IG Holland 19 (34); MR Quinn 6/23 (6.5 overs)	Ageas Bowl, Southampton; Umpires: RJ Bailey and NJ Llong
Scorecard	269 (71.5 overs); JA Leaning 112 (178); Mohammad Abbas 4/68 (18.5 overs)		300 (85 overs); JK Fuller 78* (92); NN Gilchrist 4/60 (19 overs)	Ageas Bowl, Southampton; Umpires: RJ Bailey and NJ Llong
Hampshire won the toss and chose to field.; Points: Hampshire 3, Kent 19; C McKerr played his first game for Kent.

26–29 September	Somerset	v	Kent (H)	Kent won by an innings and 151 runs
Scorecard	202 (63.5 overs); LP Goldsworthy 94 (155); NN Gilchrist 6/61 (19.5 overs)		492 (106.5 overs); Hamidullah Qadri 87 (91); KL Aldridge 6/110 (24.5 overs)	St Lawrence Ground, Canterbury; Umpires: BJ Debenham and PR Pollard
Scorecard	139 (40.4 overs); Sajid Khan 40 (19); MR Quinn 3/14 (11 overs)			St Lawrence Ground, Canterbury; Umpires: BJ Debenham and PR Pollard
Somerset won the toss and chose to bat.; Points: Kent 24, Somerset 4

== One-Day Cup ==
=== Group A ===
Pos	Team	Pld	W	L	T	NR	Ded	Pts	NRR
1	Hampshire	8	7	1	0	0	0	14	0.595
2	Lancashire	8	5	2	0	1	0	11	0.555
3	Kent	8	4	3	0	1	0	9	−0.818
4	Glamorgan	8	4	4	0	0	0	8	−0.042
5	Yorkshire	8	4	4	0	0	0	8	−0.126
6	Essex	8	3	4	0	1	0	7	0.810
7	Derbyshire	8	3	4	0	1	2	5	−0.351
8	Northamptonshire	8	2	6	0	0	0	4	−0.067
9	Worcestershire	8	2	6	0	0	0	4	−0.452

Source: Cricinfo.
- Advanced directly to the semi-finals
- Advanced to the quarter-finals

2 August	Worcestershire (H); 351/8 (50 overs)	v	Kent; 353/3 (44.5 overs)	Kent won by 7 wickets
Scorecard	Worcestershire (H); 351/8 (50 overs)	v	Kent; 353/3 (44.5 overs)	New Road, Worcester; Umpires: NL Bainton and BJ Peverall
Scorecard	Kashif Ali 114 (99); MJ Henry 3/56 (10 overs)		OG Robinson 206* (131); BL D'Oliveira 1/37 (6 overs)	New Road, Worcester; Umpires: NL Bainton and BJ Peverall
Worcestershire won the toss and chose to bat.; Points: Worcestershire 0, Kent 2; JDM Evison played his first game for Kent.; OG Robinson's 206* was the highest ever individual score for Kent on List A cricket.; The partnership of 204 between BG Compton and OG Robinson was a Kent record for the second wicket in List A cricket.				New Road, Worcester; Umpires: NL Bainton and BJ Peverall

4 August	Kent; 304/8 (50 overs)	v	Glamorgan (H); 308/7 (48.2 overs)	Glamorgan won by 3 wickets
Scorecard	Kent; 304/8 (50 overs)	v	Glamorgan (H); 308/7 (48.2 overs)	Sophia Gardens, Cardiff; Umpires: AC Harris and M Newell
Scorecard	JDM Evison 109 (121); CA Ingram 2/42 (6 overs)		CA Ingram 155 (148); GF Linde 2/59 (8.2 overs)	Sophia Gardens, Cardiff; Umpires: AC Harris and M Newell
Glamorgan won the toss and chose to field.; Points: Glamorgan 2, Kent 0				Sophia Gardens, Cardiff; Umpires: AC Harris and M Newell

7 August	Hampshire; 396/5 (50 overs)	v	Kent (H); 233 (39.2 overs)	Hampshire won by 163 runs
Scorecard	Hampshire; 396/5 (50 overs)	v	Kent (H); 233 (39.2 overs)	County Ground, Beckenham; Umpires: M Newell and M Qureshi
Scorecard	TJ Prest 181 (138); NN Gilchrist 2/65 (8 overs)		AJ Blake 62 (43); JOI Campbell4/44 (7.2 overs)	County Ground, Beckenham; Umpires: M Newell and M Qureshi
Kent won the toss and chose to field.; Points: Kent 0, Hampshire 2				County Ground, Beckenham; Umpires: M Newell and M Qureshi

11 August	Essex (H); 331 (49.2 overs)	v	Kent; 149 (33.2 overs)	Essex won by 182 runs
Scorecard	Essex (H); 331 (49.2 overs)	v	Kent; 149 (33.2 overs)	County Ground, Chelmsford; Umpires: ID Blackwell and BV Taylor
Scorecard	T Westley 109 (101); JDM Evison 3/62 (10 overs)		BG Compton 52 (82); S Snater 5/29 (6.2 overs)	County Ground, Chelmsford; Umpires: ID Blackwell and BV Taylor
Essex won the toss and elected to bat.; Points: Essex 2, Kent 0				County Ground, Chelmsford; Umpires: ID Blackwell and BV Taylor

14 August	Northamptonshire; 210 (46.5 overs)	v	Kent (H); 213/6 (43 overs)	Kent won by 4 wickets
Scorecard	Northamptonshire; 210 (46.5 overs)	v	Kent (H); 213/6 (43 overs)	St Lawrence Ground, Canterbury; Umpires: Hassan Adnan and Naeem Ashraf
Scorecard	EN Gay 49 (47); Hamidullah Qadri 4/36 (10 overs)		BG Compton 87 (119); RI Keogh 2/35 (9 overs)	St Lawrence Ground, Canterbury; Umpires: Hassan Adnan and Naeem Ashraf
Northamptonshire won the toss and chose to bat.; Points: Kent 2, Northamptonshire 0				St Lawrence Ground, Canterbury; Umpires: Hassan Adnan and Naeem Ashraf

17 August	Derbyshire (H)	v	Kent	Match abandoned
Scorecard	Derbyshire (H)	v	Kent	County Ground, Derby; Umpires: AC Harris and PJ Hartley
No toss.; No play was possible due to rain.; Points: Derbyshire 1, Kent 1				County Ground, Derby; Umpires: AC Harris and PJ Hartley

19 August	Yorkshire; 282/6 (45 overs)	v	Kent (H); 297/7 (45 overs)	Kent won by 3 wickets (DLS method)
Scorecard	Yorkshire; 282/6 (45 overs)	v	Kent (H); 297/7 (45 overs)	St Lawrence Ground, Canterbury; Umpires: RJ Warren and S Shanmugam
Scorecard	HG Duke 85 (101); JL Denly 3/37 (9 overs)		BG Compton 81 (98); MJ Waite 3/53 (9 overs)	St Lawrence Ground, Canterbury; Umpires: RJ Warren and S Shanmugam
Kent won the toss and chose to field.; The match was reduced to 45 overs per side during Yorkshire's innings due to rain. Kent were set a revised DLS target of 297.; Points: Kent 0, Yorkshire 2				St Lawrence Ground, Canterbury; Umpires: RJ Warren and S Shanmugam

23 August	Lancashire; 295/9 (50 overs)	v	Kent (H); 298/8 (49.5 overs)	Kent won by 2 wickets
Scorecard	Lancashire; 295/9 (50 overs)	v	Kent (H); 298/8 (49.5 overs)	St Lawrence Ground, Canterbury; Umpires: ID Blackwell and JD Shantry
Scorecard	GP Balderson 106* (87); NN Gilchrist 3/52 (10 overs)		AJ Blake 81 (78); JM Blatherwick 3/57 (10 overs)	St Lawrence Ground, Canterbury; Umpires: ID Blackwell and JD Shantry
Kent won the toss and elected to field.; Points: Kent 2, Lancashire 0				St Lawrence Ground, Canterbury; Umpires: ID Blackwell and JD Shantry

=== Quarter-final ===
26 August	Kent; 325/8 (50 overs)	v	Leicestershire (H); 244 (42.4 overs)	Kent won by 81 runs
Scorecard	Kent; 325/8 (50 overs)	v	Leicestershire (H); 244 (42.4 overs)	Grace Road, Leicester; Umpires: PK Baldwin and N Pratt
Scorecard	JL Denly 65 (51); BE Hendricks 2/35 (10 overs)		PWA Mulder 81 (71); G Stewart 4/42 (8.4 overs)	Grace Road, Leicester; Umpires: PK Baldwin and N Pratt
Leicestershire won the toss and chose to field.				Grace Road, Leicester; Umpires: PK Baldwin and N Pratt

=== Semi-final ===
30 August	Hampshire (H); 310/9 (50 overs)	v	Kent; 313/7 (49 overs)	Kent won by 3 wickets
Scorecard	Hampshire (H); 310/9 (50 overs)	v	Kent; 313/7 (49 overs)	Rose Bowl, Southampton; Umpires: JD Middlebrook and DJ Millns
Scorecard	NRT Gubbins 75 (84); JL Denly 2/48 (7 overs)		OG Robinson 95 (89); JOI Campbell 3/72 (10 overs)	Rose Bowl, Southampton; Umpires: JD Middlebrook and DJ Millns
Kent won the toss and chose to field.				Rose Bowl, Southampton; Umpires: JD Middlebrook and DJ Millns

=== Final ===
17 September	Kent; 306/6 (50 overs)	v	Lancashire; 285 (48.4 overs)	Kent won by 21 runs
Scorecard	Kent; 306/6 (50 overs)	v	Lancashire; 285 (48.4 overs)	Trent Bridge, Nottingham; Umpires: PR Pollard and RJ Warren; Player of the match: JDM Evison (Kent)
Scorecard	JDM Evison 97 (111); TE Bailey 2/46 (10 overs)		KK Jennings 72 (62); G Stewart 3/42 (7 overs)	Trent Bridge, Nottingham; Umpires: PR Pollard and RJ Warren; Player of the match: JDM Evison (Kent)
Kent won the toss and chose to bat.				Trent Bridge, Nottingham; Umpires: PR Pollard and RJ Warren; Player of the match: JDM Evison (Kent)

== T20 Blast ==
=== South Group ===
Pos	Team	Pld	W	L	T	NR	Pts	NRR
1	Surrey	14	10	3	0	1	21	0.630
2	Somerset	14	10	4	0	0	20	0.630
3	Essex Eagles	14	9	4	0	1	19	0.881
4	Hampshire Hawks	14	9	5	0	0	18	0.198
5	Gloucestershire	14	6	6	0	2	14	0.022
6	Glamorgan	14	5	7	0	2	12	−0.154
7	Sussex Sharks	14	4	10	0	0	8	−0.391
8	Middlesex	14	4	10	0	0	8	−0.981
9	Kent Spitfires	14	3	11	0	0	6	−0.670

Source: Cricinfo.

Advanced to the quarter-finals

25 May 2022	Kent (H); 162/6 (20 overs)	v	Somerset; 166/2 (19.1 overs)	Somerset won by 8 wickets
Scorecard	Kent (H); 162/6 (20 overs)	v	Somerset; 166/2 (19.1 overs)	St Lawrence Ground, Canterbury; Umpires: BJ Debenham and RT Robinson; Player of the match: RR Rossouw (Somerset)
Scorecard	JA Leaning 72* (43); L Gregory 3/25 (4 overs)		RR Rossouw 81* (54); FJ Klaassen 1/21 (3.1 overs)	St Lawrence Ground, Canterbury; Umpires: BJ Debenham and RT Robinson; Player of the match: RR Rossouw (Somerset)
Kent won the toss and chose to bat.; Points: Kent 0, Somerset 2				St Lawrence Ground, Canterbury; Umpires: BJ Debenham and RT Robinson; Player of the match: RR Rossouw (Somerset)

27 May 2022	Kent (H); 184/4 (20 overs)	v	Essex; 188/6 (19.4 overs)	Essex won by 4 wickets
Scorecard	Kent (H); 184/4 (20 overs)	v	Essex; 188/6 (19.4 overs)	St Lawrence Ground, Canterbury; Umpires: M Newell and MJ Saggers
Scorecard	SW Billings 48* (31); MJJ Critchley 1/16 (3 overs)		PI Walter 47* (32); FJ Klaassen 2/35 (4 overs)	St Lawrence Ground, Canterbury; Umpires: M Newell and MJ Saggers
Kent won the toss and chose to bat.; Points: Kent 0, Essex 2				St Lawrence Ground, Canterbury; Umpires: M Newell and MJ Saggers

29 May 2022	Sussex (H); 171/5 (20 overs)	v	Kent; 167/7 (20 overs)	Sussex won by 4 runs
Scorecard	Sussex (H); 171/5 (20 overs)	v	Kent; 167/7 (20 overs)	County Ground, Hove; Umpires: NL Bainton and M Burns
Scorecard	TP Alsop 65* (30); Qais Ahmad 2/23 (4 overs)		GF Linde 38* (13); RS Bopara 2/23 (4 overs)	County Ground, Hove; Umpires: NL Bainton and M Burns
Kent won the toss and chose to field.; Points: Sussex 2, Kent 0				County Ground, Hove; Umpires: NL Bainton and M Burns

1 June 2022	Kent; 114 (19.3 overs)	v	Gloucestershire (H); 116/4 (14.3 overs)	Gloucestershire won by 6 wickets
Scorecard	Kent; 114 (19.3 overs)	v	Gloucestershire (H); 116/4 (14.3 overs)	Bristol County Ground, Bristol; Umpires: GD Lloyd and JD Middlebrook; Player of the match: DA Payne (Gloucestershire)
Scorecard	JM Cox 48 (47); DA Payne 4/15 (4 overs)		GD Phillips 50* (31); G Stewart 2/14 (2 overs)	Bristol County Ground, Bristol; Umpires: GD Lloyd and JD Middlebrook; Player of the match: DA Payne (Gloucestershire)
Gloucestershire won the toss and chose to field; Points: Gloucestershire 2, Kent 0.				Bristol County Ground, Bristol; Umpires: GD Lloyd and JD Middlebrook; Player of the match: DA Payne (Gloucestershire)

3 June 2022	Surrey; 159/6 (20 overs)	v	Kent (H); 127/9 (20 overs)	Surrey won by 32 runs
Scorecard	Surrey; 159/6 (20 overs)	v	Kent (H); 127/9 (20 overs)	St Lawrence Ground, Canterbury; Umpires: NL Bainton and BV Taylor
Scorecard	SM Curran 43 (34); FJ Klaassen 2/41 (4 overs)		JL Denly 44 (46); RJW Topley 3/24 (4 overs)	St Lawrence Ground, Canterbury; Umpires: NL Bainton and BV Taylor
Kent won the toss and chose to field.; Points: Kent 0, Surrey 2				St Lawrence Ground, Canterbury; Umpires: NL Bainton and BV Taylor

5 June 2022	Kent (H); 192/8 (20 overs)	v	Middlesex; 137/8 (20 overs)	Kent won by 55 runs
Scorecard	Kent (H); 192/8 (20 overs)	v	Middlesex; 137/8 (20 overs)	St Lawrence Ground, Canterbury; Umpires: RJ Bailey and BJ Debenham
Scorecard	JL Denly 110 (58); CJ Green 3/29 (4 overs)		SS Eskinazi 30 (24); JA Leaning 3/30 (4 overs)	St Lawrence Ground, Canterbury; Umpires: RJ Bailey and BJ Debenham
Kent won the toss and chose to bat.; Points: Kent 2, Middlesex 0				St Lawrence Ground, Canterbury; Umpires: RJ Bailey and BJ Debenham

7 June 2022	Kent; 130/9 (20 overs)	v	Essex (H); 135/3 (15.3 overs)	Essex won by 7 wickets
Scorecard	Kent; 130/9 (20 overs)	v	Essex (H); 135/3 (15.3 overs)	County Ground, Chelmsford; Umpires: DJ Millns and PR Pollard
Scorecard	AJ Blake 38 (32); SJ Cook 3/29 (4 overs)		MS Pepper 30 (24); FJ Klaassen 1/20 (4 overs)	County Ground, Chelmsford; Umpires: DJ Millns and PR Pollard
Kent won the toss and chose to bat.; Points: Essex 2, Kent 0; TS Muyeye made his T20 debut.				County Ground, Chelmsford; Umpires: DJ Millns and PR Pollard

10 June 2022	Kent; 202/7 (20 overs)	v	Somerset (H); 170/9 (20 overs)	Kent won by 32 runs
Scorecard	Kent; 202/7 (20 overs)	v	Somerset (H); 170/9 (20 overs)	County Ground, Taunton; Umpires: Hassan Adnan and RJ Warren; Player of the match: JM Cox (Kent)
Scorecard	JM Cox 94 (47); C Overton 3/31 (4 overs)		TB Abell 43 (31); FJ Klaassen 2/26 (4 overs)	County Ground, Taunton; Umpires: Hassan Adnan and RJ Warren; Player of the match: JM Cox (Kent)
Somerset won the toss and chose to field.; Points: Somerset 0, Kent 2				County Ground, Taunton; Umpires: Hassan Adnan and RJ Warren; Player of the match: JM Cox (Kent)

17 June 2022	Hampshire (H); 221/3 (20 overs)	v	Kent; 167/8 (20 overs)	Hampshire won by 54 runs
Scorecard	Hampshire (H); 221/3 (20 overs)	v	Kent; 167/8 (20 overs)	Rose Bowl, Southampton; Umpires: RA Kettleborough and M Newell
Scorecard	JM Vince 100 (54); G Stewart 2/47 (4 overs)		JL Denly 49 (37); N Ellis 2/26 (4 overs); CP Wood 2/26 (4 overs)	Rose Bowl, Southampton; Umpires: RA Kettleborough and M Newell
Kent won the toss and chose to field.; Points: Hampshire 2, Kent 0				Rose Bowl, Southampton; Umpires: RA Kettleborough and M Newell

19 June 2022	Kent; 141/9 (20 overs)	v	Middlesex (H); 144/3 (17.3 overs)	Middlesex won by 7 wickets
Scorecard	Kent; 141/9 (20 overs)	v	Middlesex (H); 144/3 (17.3 overs)	Lord's, London; Umpires: RJ Bailey and N Pratt
Scorecard	SW Billings 29 (33); CJ Green 2/18 (4 overs)		JA Simpson 46 (35); FJ Klaassen 2/43 (3.3 overs)	Lord's, London; Umpires: RJ Bailey and N Pratt
Kent won the toss and chose to bat.; Points: Middlesex 2, Kent 0				Lord's, London; Umpires: RJ Bailey and N Pratt

21 June 2022	Gloucestershire; 195/4 (20 overs)	v	Kent (H); 190/5 (20 overs)	Gloucestershire won by 5 runs
Scorecard	Gloucestershire; 195/4 (20 overs)	v	Kent (H); 190/5 (20 overs)	St Lawrence Ground, Canterbury; Umpires: NJ Llong and T Lungley
Scorecard	IA Cockbain 64 (46); JL Denly 1/16 (2.1 overs)		JA Leaning 37* (18); Mohammad Amir 2/30 (4 overs)	St Lawrence Ground, Canterbury; Umpires: NJ Llong and T Lungley
Kent won the toss and chose to field.; Points: Kent 0, Gloucestershire 2; J Singh made his T20 debut.				St Lawrence Ground, Canterbury; Umpires: NJ Llong and T Lungley

24 June 2022	Sussex; 158/4 (20 overs)	v	Kent (H); 159/4 (18.5 overs)	Kent won by 6 wickets
Scorecard	Sussex; 158/4 (20 overs)	v	Kent (H); 159/4 (18.5 overs)	St Lawrence Ground, Canterbury; Umpires: M Newell and CM Watts
Scorecard	AGH Orr 36 (25); G Stewart 3/38 (4 overs)		JL Denly 58 (39); HT Crocombe 1/19 (2 overs)	St Lawrence Ground, Canterbury; Umpires: M Newell and CM Watts
Kent won the toss and chose to field.; Points: Kent 2, Sussex 0				St Lawrence Ground, Canterbury; Umpires: M Newell and CM Watts

1 July 2022	Kent; 191/5 (20 overs)	v	Surrey (H); 195/6 (18.3 overs)	Surrey won by 4 wickets
Scorecard	Kent; 191/5 (20 overs)	v	Surrey (H); 195/6 (18.3 overs)	The Oval, London; Umpires: NGB Cook and CM Watts
Scorecard	JM Cox 54 (31); J Overton 1/24 (2 overs)		JJ Roy 58 (27); Qais Ahmad 3/28 (4 overs)	The Oval, London; Umpires: NGB Cook and CM Watts
Surrey won the toss and chose to field.; Points: Surrey 2, Kent 0				The Oval, London; Umpires: NGB Cook and CM Watts

3 July 2022	Glamorgan; 190/5 (20 overs)	v	Kent (H); 155 (17.2 overs)	Glamorgan won by 35 runs
Scorecard	Glamorgan; 190/5 (20 overs)	v	Kent (H); 155 (17.2 overs)	St Lawrence Ground, Canterbury; Umpires: NL Bainton and M Newell
Scorecard	DA Douthwaite 51* (23); Qais Ahmad 2/36 (4 overs)		DI Stevens 34 (22); JP McIlroy 3/31 (3 overs)	St Lawrence Ground, Canterbury; Umpires: NL Bainton and M Newell
Glamorgan won the toss and chose to bat.; Points: Kent 0, Glamorgan 2				St Lawrence Ground, Canterbury; Umpires: NL Bainton and M Newell

== Tour Match ==
Kent hosted a four-day first-class match against the touring Sri Lanka Cricket Development XI from 6 to 9 May 2022. This was the first of six matches for the Sri Lanka A team on their tour of England.

6–9 June	Kent (H)	v	Sri Lanka Cricket Development XI	Match drawn
Scorecard	595/8d (137 overs); DI Stevens 168 (142); YH Rodrigo 2/90 (24 overs)		658/9d (160.3 overs); N Madushka 269 (392); MJ Luckett 2/73 (15.3 overs)	St Lawrence Ground, Canterbury; Umpires: NL Bainton and M Newell
Scorecard	200/1d (48.3 overs); MK O'Riordan 102* (149)			St Lawrence Ground, Canterbury; Umpires: NL Bainton and M Newell
Kent won the toss and elected to bat.; MJ Luckett and SW Mead made their first-class debuts.
