= List of Kent County Cricket Club first-class cricket records =

This is a list of Kent County Cricket Club first-class cricket records including record team and individual performances in first-class cricket for Kent County Cricket Club.

As of September 2024, Kent have played over 3,400 first-class matches since the club's official formation in 1842. More than 2,700 of these have been in the County Championship, which Kent have been a member of since its inaugural season in 1890. Before August 1842, the county was represented by a number of first-class teams who competed against county teams and other representative teams.

== Team records ==
All records last updated 17 May 2025

Kent's highest score in an innings was achieved in 1934 against Essex at Brentwood. Their highest score at a home ground was set in 2017 at Beckenham with Northamptonshire as the opposition. This surpassed the score of 633/8, made in 2015 at Tunbridge Wells against Essex. The county's lowest innings totals all date from the 19th century.

Highest team total in an innings
Runs	Opposition	Venue	Season
803/4 dec	v Essex	Old County Ground, Brentwood	1934
701/7 dec	v Northants	County Cricket Ground, Beckenham	2017
652/7 dec	v Middlesex	Uxbridge Cricket Club	2009
633/8 dec	v Essex	Nevill Ground, Tunbridge Wells	2015
621/6 dec	v Essex	Angel Ground, Tonbridge	1922

Lowest team total in a completed innings
Runs	Teams	Venue	Season
18	v Sussex	Bat and Ball Ground, Gravesend	1867
20	v Surrey	The Oval	1870
23	v Sussex	Royal Brunswick Ground, Hove	1859
25	v Derbyshire	Wirksworth	1874
25	v MCC	Lord's	1879

- Highest total against in an innings: 722/6d by Northants at Canterbury, 2025
- Lowest total against in an innings: 16 by Warwickshire at Tonbridge, 1913

=== Highest partnerships ===
The highest partnership in Kent's history was 423 runs scored by Jordan Cox and Jack Leaning, set in 2020 at Canterbury against Sussex. This surpassed the previous highest partnership of 382 runs, set in 2017. Cox and Leaning's partnership was unbroken when Kent were forced to declare their innings after 120 overs. (Note: The unbroken partnership between Cox and Leaning was made during the 2020 Bob Willis Trophy competition during which teams batting in their first innings were limited to 120 overs.)

Runs	Players		Opposition	Venue	Season
423* (2nd wicket)	Jordan Cox (238*)	Jack Leaning (220*)	v Sussex	St Lawrence Ground, Canterbury	2020
382 (2nd wicket)	Sean Dickson (318)	Joe Denly (182)	v Northamptonshire	County Cricket Ground, Beckenham	2017
368 (4th wicket)	Aravinda de Silva (255)	Graham Cowdrey (137)	v Derbyshire	Mote Park, Maidstone	1995
366 (2nd wicket)	Simon Hinks (234)	Neil Taylor (152*)	v Middlesex	St Lawrence Ground, Canterbury	1990
352 (2nd wicket)	Bill Ashdown (332)	Frank Woolley (172)	v Essex	Old County Ground, Brentwood	1934

Highest partnership for each wicket
Partnership	Runs	Players		Opposition	Venue	Season
1st wicket	300	Neil Taylor (146)	Mark Benson (160)	v Derbyshire	St Lawrence Ground, Canterbury	1991
2nd wicket	423*	Jordan Cox (238*)	Jack Leaning (220*)	v Sussex	St Lawrence Ground, Canterbury	2020
3rd wicket	323	Rob Key (189)	Martin van Jaarsveld (168)	v Surrey	Nevill Ground, Tunbridge Wells	2005
4th wicket	368	Aravinda de Silva (255)	Graham Cowdrey (137)	v Derbyshire	Mote Park, Maidstone	1995
5th wicket	277	Frank Woolley (224)	Les Ames (115)	v New Zealanders	St Lawrence Ground, Canterbury	1931
6th wicket	346	Sam Billings (110)	Darren Stevens (237)	v Yorkshire	Headingley, Leeds	2019
7th wicket	264	Chris Benjamin (93)	Grant Stewart (182)	v Gloucestershire	County Ground, Bristol	2025
8th wicket	222	Sam Northeast (166*)	James Tredwell (124)	v Essex	County Cricket Ground, Chelmsford	2016
9th wicket	171	Mark Ealham (122)	Paul Strang (73)	v Nottinghamshire	Trent Bridge, Nottingham	1997
10th wicket	235	Frank Woolley (185)	Arthur Fielder (112*)	v Worcestershire	War Memorial Athletic Ground, Stourbridge	1909

The stand of 235 achieved by Woolley and Fielder in 1909 remains, as of 2026, a record for the 10th wicket in the County Championship.

== Appearances ==
Five men have made more than 500 appearances for Kent in first-class cricket.

- 764 Frank Woolley, 1906−1938
- 606 Wally Hardinge, 1902–1933
- 536 James Seymour, 1902–1926
- 520 Derek Underwood, 1963–1987
- 506 Tich Freeman, 1914–1936

== Individual batting records ==
Frank Woolley holds the records for most runs scored for Kent, as well as most runs in a season and most centuries in a career with 122, the only player with more than 100 centuries for the county. He made 10 centuries for the county in both the 1928 and 1934 seasons. Arthur Fagg scored two double centuries in a match against Essex at Colchester in 1938, a feat unique in first-class cricket until February 2019.

The highest individual score for the county is 332 runs, achieved by Bill Ashdown against Essex at Brentwood in 1934. Ashdown is one of only three men to have scored more than 300 runs in an innings for the county, doing so twice in his career. Sean Dickson and Daniel Bell-Drummond are the only other triple-centurions for Kent. Dickson scored 318 runs against Northamptonshire in 2017, part of a new record partnership for any wicket for Kent with Joe Denly. The innings was Kent's highest score since the Second World War. (Note: Dickson and Denly's partnership was surpassed in 2020 by Jordan Cox and Jack Leaning.) Bell-Drummond made 300 not out in 2023, also against Northants, in a match at Northampton.

Most career runs
Runs	Player	Innings	Period
47,868	Frank Woolley	1,213	1906–1938
32,549	Wally Hardinge	990	1902–1933
28,951	Les Ames	717	1926–1951
26,818	James Seymour	881	1902–1926
26,070	Arthur Fagg	767	1932–1957

Most runs in a season
Runs	Player	Innings	Season
2,894	Frank Woolley	52	1928
2,540	Frank Woolley	51	1934
2,446	Wally Hardinge	46	1928
2,428	Les Ames	48	1933
2,420	Arthur Fagg	47	1948

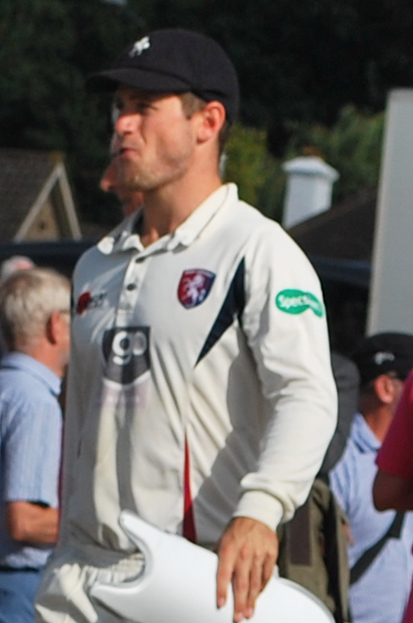
Sean Dickson scored Kent's second highest individual score of all time in 2017

Highest individual score in an innings (* denotes not out)
Runs	Player	Opponent	Venue	Season
332	Bill Ashdown	v Essex	Old County Ground, Brentwood	1934
318	Sean Dickson	v Northamptonshire	County Cricket Ground, Beckenham	2017
305*	Bill Ashdown	v Derbyshire	Crabble Athletic Ground, Dover	1935
300*	Daniel Bell-Drummond	v Northamptonshire	Wantage Road, Northampton	2023
295	Les Ames	v Gloucestershire	Cheriton Road, Folkestone	1933

== Individual bowling records ==
Spin bowlers Tich Freeman and Colin Blythe dominate Kent bowling records. Freeman is the leading wicket-taker in Kent's history and holds the records for the most 5-for and 10-for innings in first-class cricket. Blythe has the best known figures in an innings for the county, taking 10/30 against Northamptonshire in 1907.

Freeman took 10 wickets in a match for Kent 128 times with Blythe achieving the same feat 64 times. Doug Wright took six first-class hat-tricks for the county during his career, as well as one for MCC in 1938/39. His seven hat-tricks is a world best total in first-class cricket. Dean Headley took three hat-tricks in the 1996 season for Kent, equalling the world best. Joseph Wells became the first recorded bowler to take four wickets in four balls for any team when playing for Kent against Sussex in 1862.

Most wickets in a career
Wickets	Player	Matches	Average	Career
3,340	Tich Freeman	506	17.64	1914–1936
2,210	Colin Blythe	381	16.67	1899–1914
1,951	Derek Underwood	520	19.21	1963–1987
1,709	Doug Wright	397	22.68	1932–1957
1,680	Frank Woolley	764	18.84	1906–1938

Most wickets in a season
Wickets	Player	Season
262	Tich Freeman	1933
260	Tich Freeman	1930
257	Tich Freeman	1931
246	Tich Freeman	1928
226	Tich Freeman	1932

Note: The most wickets taken in a season for Kent by a bowler other than Freeman is 185, by Colin Blythe, in 1909. Freeman (14 times), Blythe (eight times), Arthur Fielder (twice) and Frank Woolley (once) are the only men to take 150 wickets or more in a season for Kent.

Best figures in an innings
Bowling	Player	Opponent	Venue	Season
10/30	Colin Blythe	v Northamptonshire	County Cricket Ground, Northampton	1907
10/53	Tich Freeman	v Essex	Southchurch Park, Southend-on-Sea	1930
10/65	George Collins	v Nottinghamshire	Crabble Athletic Ground, Dover	1922
10/79	Tich Freeman	v Lancashire	Old Trafford, Manchester	1931
10/131	Tich Freeman	v Lancashire	Mote Park, Maidstone	1929

Edmund Hinkly took ten wickets in an innings against England at Lord's in 1848, the first time that the feat of taking all ten wickets in a first-class innings is known to have been achieved in first-class cricket. It is not known how many runs he conceded in doing so. These are the only occasions on which a Kent bowler has taken all 10 wickets in an innings.

Best figures in a match
Bowling	Player	Opponent	Venue	Season
17/48	Colin Blythe	v Northamptonshire	County Ground, Northampton	1907
17/67	Tich Freeman	v Sussex	County Ground, Hove	1922
17/92	Tich Freeman	v Warwickshire	Cheriton Road, Folkestone	1932
16/80	Doug Wright	v Somerset	Recreation Ground, Bath	1939
16/82	Tich Freeman	v Northamptonshire	Nevill Ground, Tunbridge Wells	1932

Hinkly took 16 wickets in the match against England in 1848 but, again, it is not known how many runs he conceded.

As of November 2017, only three players have taken a wicket for Kent with their first ball in first-class cricket for the county: George McCanlis in 1873, Colin Blythe in 1899 and Gerald Hough in 1919. Hough's wicket was the only one he took in his first-class career.

== Fielding records ==
Frank Woolley holds the Kent record for the most catches by a non-wicket-keeper, with 773 taken during his long career with the county. James Seymour is the only other man to take more than 500 catches, with 659. Chris Tavaré holds the record for the most catches in a season for Kent, with 48 taken in 1978. Seymour took 40 or more catches for the county six times during his career.

- Most catches in an innings: 6 James Seymour vs South Africans at Canterbury, 1904 and Stuart Leary vs Cambridge University at Fenner's, 1958
- Most catches in a match: 8 John Prodger vs Gloucestershire at College Ground, Cheltenham, 1961
- Most catches in a season: 48 Chris Tavaré, 1978
- Most catches in a career: 773 Frank Woolley, 1906–1938

== Wicketkeeping records ==
Kent is known for having produced a line of top-class wicketkeepers. The long-serving Fred Huish, who played for the county between 1895 and 1914, holds the record for the most career dismissals for the county. Huish's nine stumpings in one match in 1911 are a world record, and prior to the 2022 season he and Jack Hubble held the club record for the most dismissals in a match with 10. This was beaten by Sam Billings, who took 12 dismissals, setting a new record for the most dismissals in a County Championship match in the process.

- Most dismissals in an innings: 8 Steve Marsh vs Middlesex at Lord's, 1991 (8 catches, no stumpings)
- Most dismissals in a match: 12 Sam Billings vs Warwickshire at Edgbaston, 2022 (12 catches, no stumpings)
- Most catches in a season: 78 Alan Knott, 1967
- Most stumpings in a season: 56 Les Ames, 1932
- Most total dismissals in a season: 116 Les Ames, 1929
- Most catches in a career: 901 Fred Huish, 1895–1914
- Most stumpings in a career: 352 Fred Huish, 1895–1914
- Most total dismissals in a career: 1,253 Fred Huish, 1895–1914

== See also ==
- List of Kent County Cricket Club List A cricket records
- List of Kent County Cricket Club Twenty20 cricket records
