= Simon Hinks =

English cricketer

Personal information
- Full name: Simon Graham Hinks
- Born: 12 October 1960 (age 66); Northfleet, Kent
- Batting: Left-handed
- Bowling: Right-arm medium

Domestic team information
- Years: Team
- 1982–1991: Kent
- 1992–1994: Gloucestershire
- FC debut: 2 June 1982 Kent v Hampshire
- Last FC: 11 June 1994 Gloucestershire v New Zealanders
- LA debut: 13 June 1982 Kent v Northants
- Last LA: 4 May 1999 Gloucestershire Cricket Board v Yorkshire Cricket Board

Career statistics
Competition	First-class	List A
Matches	182	174
Runs scored	8,715	4,026
Batting average	29.05	25.48
100s/50s	11/43	0/26
Top score	234	99
Balls bowled	603	426
Wickets	8	11
Bowling average	47.87	33.63
5 wickets in innings	0	0
10 wickets in match	0	0
Best bowling	2/18	2/10
Catches/stumpings	114/0	48/0
- Source: CricInfo, 10 November 2017

Simon Graham Hinks (born 12 October 1960) is a former English professional cricketer. He played for Kent County Cricket Club and Gloucestershire County Cricket Club between 1982 and 1994, scoring over 8,700 runs in first-class cricket. Since retirement he has coached cricket and worked in sports administration at the University of Bristol.

== Cricket career ==
Hinks was born in Northfleet, Kent in 1960. He first played for the Kent Second XI in 1979 before making his first-class cricket debut for the county in June 1982 in a match against Hampshire at Bournemouth. He played 154 first-class and 137 list A matches for the county, playing most regularly between 1985 and 1990. He scored 1,000 first-class runs in 1985, 1989 and 1990 and made 11 centuries for Kent. His highest score of 234 was made against Middlesex at Canterbury in 1990, the innings contributing to a Kent record score for the second wicket of 366 with Neil Taylor which lasted until 2017. He was awarded his county cap in 1985.

After playing infrequently in 1991, Hinks moved to Gloucestershire for the start of the 1992 season, playing there until 1994. He played club cricket for Stroud Cricket Club and Thornbury Cricket Club. He played for Gloucestershire Cricket Board in the Minor Counties Trophy in 1998 and made a final limited-overs appearance in the 1999 NatWest Trophy.

== Professional life after cricket ==
After retirement Hinks worked at the University of Bristol, initially as a fundraiser before rising to the position of Director of Sport, Exercise and Health. He resigned from his post at the end of 2014 . He then and acted as Head Coach at the Bristol Academy of Sport based at South Gloucestershire and Stroud College. He worked for Otium Ltd in Phuket, Thailand in 2019/2020 before returning to the UK to work as a professional Match Referee with the England and Wales Cricket Board.
