= Toby Pettman =

English cricketer (born 1998)

Personal information
- Full name: Toby Henry Somerville Pettman
- Born: 11 May 1998 (age 28); Kingston upon Thames, London
- Batting: Right-handed
- Bowling: Right-arm medium-fast

Domestic team information
- Years: Team
- 2017–2020: Oxford University
- 2018–2019: Oxford MCCU (Note: Oxford MCCU differed from Oxford University Cricket Club in that it was open to students at Oxford Brookes University, whereas Oxford University Cricket Club is exclusively for students of the constituent colleges of the University of Oxford.)
- 2022–2024: Nottinghamshire
- 2022: → Derbyshire (on loan)
- 2022: → Kent (on loan)

Career statistics
Competition	First-class	List A
Matches	11	9
Runs scored	126	14
Batting average	12.60	14
100s/50s	0/1	0/0
Top score	54*	9*
Balls bowled	2,081	372
Wickets	44	9
Bowling average	23.20	39.22
5 wickets in innings	2	0
10 wickets in match	0	0
Best bowling	5/19	4/44
Catches/stumpings	4/–	2/–
- Source: Cricinfo, 28 September 2024

Toby Henry Somerville Pettman (born 11 May 1998) is a retired English first-class cricketer who played for Nottinghamshire, Oxford University Cricket Club and Oxford MCCU.

== Early life and career ==
Pettman was born in Kingston upon Thames in May 1998. He was educated at Tonbridge School, before going up to Jesus College, Oxford to read classics, graduating in 2020 with a double first. While studying at Oxford, Pettman made four appearances in first-class cricket for Oxford University against Cambridge University in The University Matches of 2017, 2018, 2019, and 2020, captaining the side in the 2020 game (the last to have first-class status). In addition to playing for Oxford University, Pettman also made three first-class appearances for Oxford MCCU against Kent in 2018 and Middlesex and Hampshire in 2019. In seven first-class matches, Pettman scored 122 runs at an average of 17.42 and a high score of 54 not out, while with his right-arm fast-medium bowling he took 33 wickets at a bowling average of 21.15, twice taking a five wicket haul. He recorded his best figures of 5 for 19 in the University Match of 2019.

After leaving Oxford in 2020, Pettman was about to start a job in data analytics when he was offered a one-year professional cricket contract by Nottinghamshire coach Peter Moores. He played for the Nottinghamshire 2nd XI in 2021 and then signed another one-year contract for 2022. In November 2021, he was selected for a Marylebone Cricket Club squad to play a tournament in Almería, Spain.

Pettman began the 2022 season once again in the Nottinghamshire 2nd XI. In June 2022, he joined Derbyshire on a short-term loan. Making his County Championship debut against Middlesex at Queen's Park, Chesterfield, he took 3 wickets for 40 runs to record the best bowling figures in Derbyshire's first innings. Later in the month, he also played a single Championship game for Kent as a short-term loan signing to cover for injuries.

On 20 August 2022, Pettman made his List A debut for Nottinghamshire in a One-Day Cup match against Leicestershire, taking 1/45 off nine overs and scoring five not out. In his second game of the competition three days later, he took a career-best 4/44 against Surrey.

Pettman signed a new two-year contract with Nottinghamshire in October 2022. He announced his retirement from professional cricket in September 2024.
