= Bill Ashdown =

English cricketer

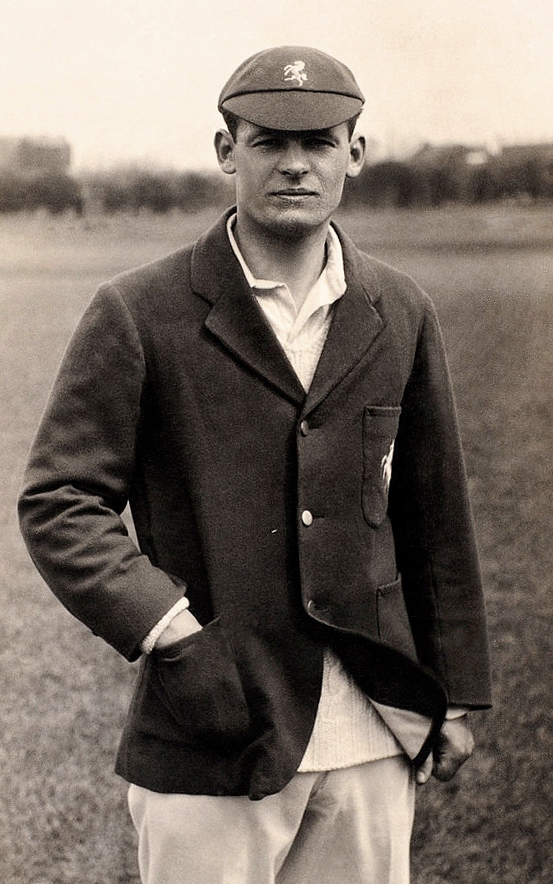
- Ashdown in about 1932

Personal information
- Full name: William Henry Ashdown
- Born: 27 December 1898; Bromley, Kent
- Died: 15 September 1979 (aged 80); Rugby, Warwickshire
- Batting: Right-handed
- Bowling: Right arm medium-fast

Domestic team information
- Years: Team
- 1920–1937: Kent

Umpiring information
- Tests umpired: 3 (1949–1950)

Career statistics
Competition	First-class
Matches	487
Runs scored	22,589
Batting average	30.73
100s/50s	39/105
Top score	332
Balls bowled	44,212
Wickets	602
Bowling average	32.47
5 wickets in innings	13
10 wickets in match	0
Best bowling	6/23
Catches/stumpings	400/1
- Source: ESPNcricinfo, 17 April 2009

William Henry Ashdown (27 December 1898 – 15 September 1979) was an English professional cricketer. He is one of a very few men who played first-class cricket before the First World War and after the Second World War. (Note: Another was D. B. Deodhar, who played in the Bombay Triangular in 1911 and the Ranji Trophy in 1946.)

Ashdown was born in Bromley in Kent. He first played first-class cricket in 1914, playing for Gerry Weigall's XI against Oxford University in The Parks, aged 15. During World War I he served in a reserve battalion of the Rifle Brigade on home defence duties.

Playing for Kent County Cricket Club after the First World War, Ashdown scored 39 centuries, including two triple-centuries with a highest score of 332 against Essex in 1934. This remains Kent's highest individual score. His second triple-century for the county was scored in 1935. He is one of only three Kent batsman to have scored a triple-century whilst playing for the county. (Note: Sean Dickson scored 318 in 2017, Daniel Bell-Drummond scored 300* in 2023.) He scored more than 1,000 runs in 11 seasons of county cricket. He was also successful as a bowler, taking 602 wickets at a bowling average of 32.47. He was awarded his county cap in 1922 and retired in 1937. He returned to play a final first-class match in 1947, aged 48, for Maurice Leyland's XI against the Rest of England at Harrogate when he scored 42 and 40 and took five wickets for 73 runs.

He became an umpire after retiring from first-class cricket, and stood in two Tests against New Zealand in 1949 and one against the West Indies in 1950. He stepped down from the umpire's list resume his playing career as captain of Leicestershire 2nd XI until he was 55, doubling up as their coach and scorer. He died in Rugby, Warwickshire, aged 80.

== Bibliography ==
- Carlaw, Derek (2020). Kent County Cricketers, A to Z: Part Two (1919–1939) (PDF). Cardiff: ACS.
