= Old County Ground, Brentwood =

Cricket ground in Brentwood, England

Coordinates: 51.6239°N 0.3092°E

Old County Ground
- Interactive map of Old County Ground

Ground information
- Location: Brentwood, Essex
- Country: England
- Establishment: 1876 (first recorded match)

Team information
| Essex | (1922 & 1934–1969) |
- As of 12 September 2010; Source: Ground profile

Old County Ground is a cricket ground in Brentwood, Essex. The first recorded match on the ground was in 1876, when Essex played Suffolk in a non first-class match.

Essex played their first match there against Dublin University in 1922, which was a first-class fixture. In 1934, Essex returned to the ground where they played Kent in the first County Championship match held at the ground. Essex played 56 further first-class matches there between 1934 and 1969, playing their final first-class match there against Worcestershire.

In addition, the ground has also hosted 2 List-A matches, the first of which came in the 1965 Gillette Cup and saw Essex play Derbyshire. The second and final List-A match held there saw Essex play Kent in the 1967 Gillette Cup.

In local domestic cricket, the ground is the home venue of Brentwood Cricket Club who play in the Essex Premier League.
