= John Prodger =

English cricketer

Personal information
- Full name: John Michael Prodger
- Born: 1 September 1935 (age 91); Forest Hill, London
- Batting: Right-handed
- Role: Batsman

Domestic team information
- Years: Team
- 1956–1967: Kent
- Source: Cricinfo, 5 April 2014

John Michael Prodger (born 1 September 1935) is an English former cricketer. He played in first-class and List A cricket matches for Kent County Cricket Club between 1956 and 1967 as a right-handed middle-order batsman. He also played football as a goalkeeper.

== Life and career ==
Prodger played in 161 matches for Kent, scoring three centuries and taking 175 catches for the county. He made his highest score when he opened the innings against Essex in 1961 and scored 170 not out before Kent declared at 377 for 5. Regarded as an excellent fielder, Prodger took eight catches in a match against Gloucestershire in 1961, the record for catches in a match by a Kent outfielder. In a match in 1963 he had the distinction of taking a catch whilst fielding as a substitute fielder for Middlesex and later scoring a half-century in the same innings, the only player known to have done so in first-class cricket. He was awarded his county cap in 1965.

Prodger also played football as a goalkeeper. He began his career at Charlton but did not play a match for the side in the football league before moving to Dartford in 1953, playing for the side whilst he completed his national service. He moved to Margate where he played the majority of his career, making 102 appearances for the side. He also played in short spells at Gravesend and Northfleet and Sittingbourne in the Kent league and finished his career with Dartford in 1965.

Prodger worked as a draughtsman at an engineering company in Dartford.
