= Aron Nijjar =

English cricketer (born 1994)

Personal information
- Full name: Aron Stuart Singh Nijjar
- Born: 24 September 1994 (age 32); Goodmayes, London, England
- Batting: Left-handed
- Bowling: Slow left-arm orthodox

Domestic team information
- Years: Team
- 2015–2023: Essex (squad no. 19)
- 2017: Cardiff MCCU
- 2023: → Kent (on loan)
- FC debut: 31 May 2015 Essex v Leicestershire
- LA debut: 4 August 2015 Essex v Hampshire

Career statistics
| Competition | FC | LA | T20 |
|---|---|---|---|
| Matches | 16 | 27 | 37 |
| Runs scored | 298 | 229 | 97 |
| Batting average | 22.92 | 15.26 | 8.81 |
| 100s/50s | 0/1 | 0/0 | 0/0 |
| Top score | 53 | 32* | 27* |
| Balls bowled | 1,991 | 1,345 | 741 |
| Wickets | 29 | 33 | 29 |
| Bowling average | 38.72 | 34.69 | 35.62 |
| 5 wickets in innings | 0 | 0 | 0 |
| 10 wickets in match | 0 | 0 | 0 |
| Best bowling | 4/67 | 3/32 | 3/22 |
| Catches/stumpings | 3/– | 11/– | 12/– |
- Source: CricketArchive, 29 September 2023

Aron Stuart Singh Nijjar (born 24 September 1994) is an English cricketer who most recently played for Essex County Cricket Club. Primarily a left-handed slow left-arm orthodox bowler, he also bats left-handed. He made his First-class debut for Essex against Leicestershire in May 2015. He made his Twenty20 debut for Essex in the 2018 t20 Blast on 17 August 2018.

Despite consistent performances with bat and ball in the Essex 2nd XI, the excellence and uninterrupted availability of spin-bowling all-rounder Simon Harmer limited Nijjar's appearances for the Essex first team. In September 2023 Nijjar joined Kent on loan for the last three games of the season. On 14 September 2023, Nijjar was released by Essex.
