= Tawanda Muyeye =

Zimbabwean cricketer

Personal information
- Full name: Tawanda Sean Muyeye
- Born: 5 March 2001 (age 25); Harare, Zimbabwe
- Batting: Right-handed
- Bowling: Right-arm off break
- Role: Batter

Domestic team information
- Years: Team
- 2021–: Kent (squad no. 14)
- 2023–2025: Oval Invincibles
- 2024/25: Melbourne Renegades
- FC debut: 13 May 2021 Kent v Sussex
- LA debut: 22 July 2021 Kent v Durham

Career statistics
Competition	FC	LA	T20
Matches	51	12	70
Runs scored	2,921	251	1,556
Batting average	34.36	25.10	23.22
100s/50s	5/14	0/0	1/10
Top score	211	40	100
Balls bowled	776	84	–
Wickets	5	2	–
Bowling average	106.80	22.50	–
5 wickets in innings	0	0	–
10 wickets in match	0	0	–
Best bowling	2/70	1/12	–
Catches/stumpings	59/–	2/–	27/–
- Source: Cricinfo, 26 September 2026

Tawanda Sean Muyeye (born 5 March 2001) is a Zimbabwean professional cricketer who plays for Kent County Cricket Club in England. He is a right-handed batsman and right-arm off break bowler.

== Early life ==
Muyeye was born in Zimbabwe and grew up close to Harare. He was educated at Peterhouse Boys' School in Mashonaland East Province and captained the Zimbabwe national team at under-13 and under-16 level, as well as playing rugby union for the national under-14 team, before earning a scholarship to Eastbourne College in England. Muyeye was named as a reserve in the Zimbabwean squad for the 2018 Under-19 Cricket World Cup at the age of 15.

An asylum seeker who came to the UK with his mother, a supporter of the opposition Movement for Democratic Change, Muyeye was granted indefinite leave to remain and settled in the UK. He has expressed an ambition to play international cricket for England.

At Eastbourne he was coached by former professionals Rob Ferley, James Tredwell and Andy Hodd and scored 1,112 runs and hit 56 sixes in his first season, both records for the school. His batting performances for Eastbourne, including two double hundreds, led him to being named the 2019 Young Wisden Schools Cricketer of the Year.

== Professional cricket career ==
While at Eastbourne, Muyeye played for Sussex's under-17 and second XI teams, but signed his first professional contract with Kent in March 2021, qualifying as a domestic player after his time at Eastbourne. He made his first-class cricket debut for Kent on 13 May 2021, in the 2021 County Championship against Sussex at Hove and his List A debut later the same season in the 2021 Royal London One-Day Cup. He made his Twenty20 debut on 7 June 2022 in the 2022 T20 Blast.

In January 2023, Muyeye signed a new three-year contract with Kent. He made his maiden first-class century in June 2023, scoring 179 as part of a 318-run partnership with Daniel Bell-Drummond for Kent against Northants. The following season he scored his maiden double century, making 211 runs against Worcestershire at New Road in August 2024.

In July 2023, Muyeye was selected as a wildcard player by The Hundred team Oval Invincibles. He was retained for the 2024 season, and in January 2025 joined Australian Big Bash League team Melbourne Renegades for the remainder of the 2024–25 season, replacing Laurie Evans as an overseas player. Muyeye had been playing grade cricket in Perth during the 2024–25 Australian season.

In July 2025, Muyeye agreed a contract extension at Kent to keep him at the club until at least the end of the 2027 season.
