= Jas Singh (cricketer, born 2002) =

English cricketer

Jaskaran Singh
Personal information
- Born: 19 September 2002 (age 24); Denmark Hill, Camberwell, London Borough of Southwark
- Batting: Right-handed
- Bowling: Right-arm fast-medium
- Role: Bowler

Domestic team information
- Years: Team
- 2021–: Kent (squad no. 19)
- FC debut: 11 July 2021 Kent v Sussex
- LA debut: 9 August 2023 Kent v Lancashire

Career statistics
Competition	FC	LA	T20
Matches	16	5	5
Runs scored	126	24	1
Batting average	9.00	24.00	1.00
100s/50s	0/0	0/0	0/0
Top score	18	19*	1
Balls bowled	1,865	210	66
Wickets	29	5	5
Bowling average	52.17	45.40	27.20
5 wickets in innings	0	0	0
10 wickets in match	0	0	0
Best bowling	4/35	3/74	3/27
Catches/stumpings	4/–	1/–	0/–
- Source: Cricinfo, 05 May 2026

Jaskaran Singh (born 19 September 2002) is an English cricketer. He made his first-class cricket debut for Kent County Cricket Club against Sussex on 11 July 2021 in the County Championship following a member of the county's First XI squad testing positive for COVID-19 which required the players involved in the county's previous match to all self-isolate. As a result, a number of Second XI players or "homegrown prospects" were drafted into the squad and made their senior debuts for the county. Singh took four top-order wickets in Sussex's first innings on debut, finishing with innings with four wickets at the cost of 51 runs (4/51) from 11 overs.

Singh was born at Denmark Hill in London in 2001 and educated at Wilmington Academy close to Dartford, Kent. He plays club cricket for Bexley Cricket Club in the Kent Cricket League. He was part of Kent's age-group teams from the age of nine and a member of the Kent cricket academy in 2021. He first played for the county's Second XI in 2019. He made his Twenty20 debut on 21 June 2022, for Kent in the 2022 T20 Blast.

As part of his development, Singh has spent British winters in Australia playing cricket. In 2021–22 he spent time at the Darren Lehmann Academy in Adelaide and played grade cricket for Northern Districts, a trip that was partly financed by Kent supports and by Bexley Cricket Club. In the 2024–25 off-season he played for Adelaide University, living with Kent and Australia fast bowler Wes Agar.

Singh missed most of the 2025 campaign after suffering an ankle injury in April 2025. Singh signed two-year contract extension with Kent on 13 Oct 2025.
