= Jack Leaning =

English cricketer

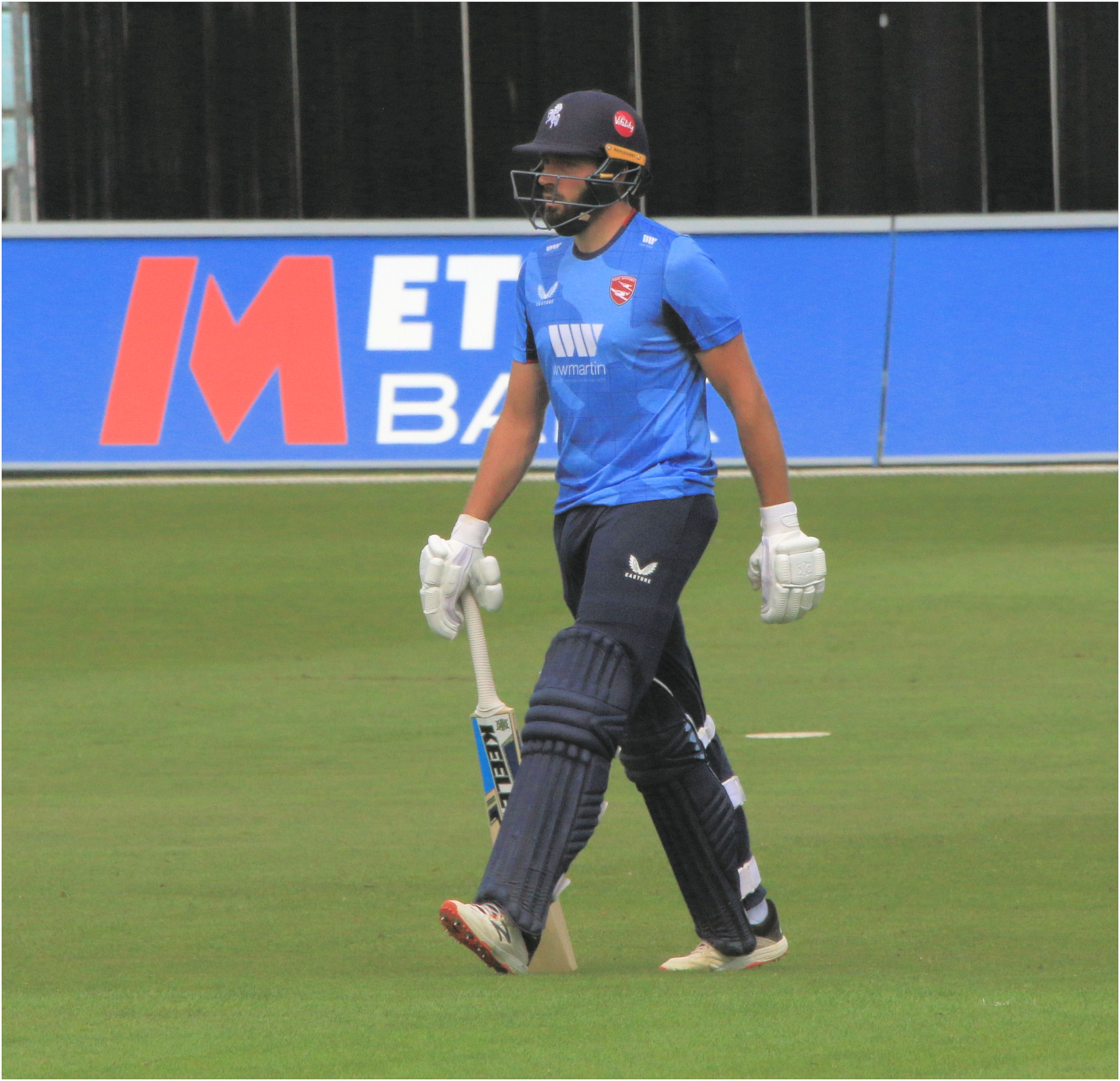
- Leaning in 2023

Personal information
- Full name: Jack Andrew Leaning
- Born: 18 October 1993 (age 33); Bristol, England
- Batting: Right-handed
- Bowling: Right-arm off spin
- Role: Batsman

Domestic team information
- Years: Team
- 2012–2019: Yorkshire (squad no. 34)
- 2020–2025: Kent (squad no. 34)
- 2021: Trent Rockets
- 2026–: Sussex (squad no. 34)
- FC debut: 21 June 2013 Yorkshire v Surrey
- LA debut: 27 August 2012 Yorkshire v Warwickshire

Career statistics
Competition	FC	LA	T20
Matches	142	85	132
Runs scored	6,782	2,233	2,273
Batting average	31.84	34.89	26.43
100s/50s	12/34	3/14	0/8
Top score	220*	137*	81*
Balls bowled	4,180	873	546
Wickets	46	20	28
Bowling average	61.45	39.40	25.92
5 wickets in innings	0	1	0
10 wickets in match	0	0	0
Best bowling	3/64	5/22	3/15
Catches/stumpings	147/–	41/–	72/–
- Source: Cricinfo, 26 September 2026

Jack Andrew Leaning (born 18 October 1993) is an English first-class cricketer. A right-handed batsman and right arm off-spin bowler, Leaning joined Sussex County Cricket Club at the end of the 2025 season, having previously played cricket for Yorkshire, who he made his professional debut for in 2012, and Kent.

Leaning joined Yorkshire in 2008, starting at under 15 level. He went on to play for the Yorkshire Academy in the Yorkshire ECB County Premier League, and the Yorkshire Second XI in the Second XI Championship, before making his List A debut against Warwickshire in August 2012 and his first-class debut against Surrey in June 2013. He became an established member of the Yorkshire team during the 2014 season.

In 2014, several York City F.C. fans sponsored Leaning in his first season as a full professional cricketer. His father Andy is a former player and goalkeeping coach of York.

In August 2019 it was announced that Leaning would join Kent County Cricket Club at the end of the 2019 English cricket season. In his second match for Kent he scored his maiden double-century, making 220 not out in a Kent record partnership for any wicket of 423 runs against Sussex at Canterbury in the 2020 Bob Willis Trophy. The innings was his first century for three seasons. In April 2022, he was bought by the Oval Invincibles for the 2022 season of The Hundred.

In October 2025, Leaning joined Sussex on a three-year contract.
