= Rob Keogh =

English cricketer (born 1991)

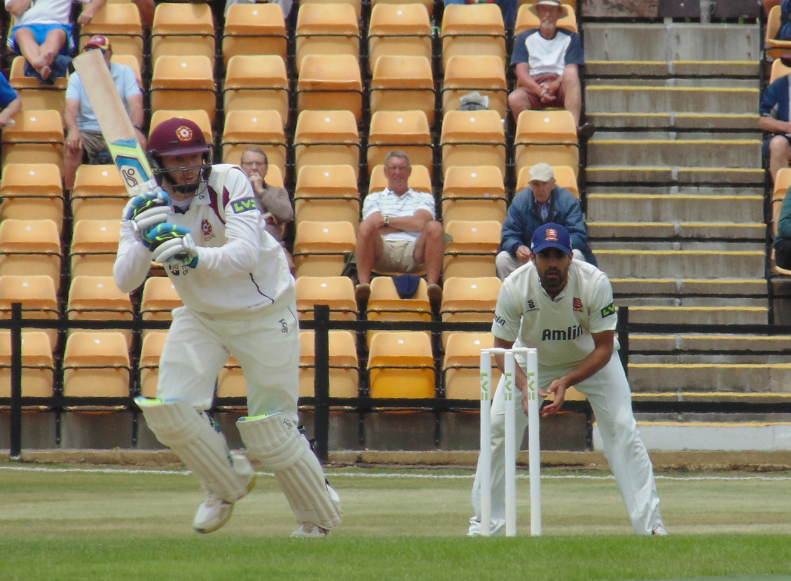

Personal information
- Full name: Robert Ian Keogh
- Born: 21 October 1991 (age 35); Dunstable, Bedfordshire, England
- Batting: Right-handed
- Bowling: Right-arm off break
- Role: Batsman

Domestic team information
- Years: Team
- 2010–2026: Northamptonshire (squad no. 14)
- First-class debut: 28 August 2012 Northants v Glamorgan
- List A debut: 31 August 2010 Northants v Yorkshire

Career statistics
| Competition | FC | LA | T20 |
|---|---|---|---|
| Matches | 145 | 82 | 88 |
| Runs scored | 6,949 | 2,095 | 1,096 |
| Batting average | 30.88 | 30.36 | 26.09 |
| 100s/50s | 18/24 | 3/15 | 0/4 |
| Top score | 221 | 134 | 59* |
| Balls bowled | 12,065 | 2,091 | 318 |
| Wickets | 174 | 41 | 16 |
| Bowling average | 39.78 | 46.80 | 27.43 |
| 5 wickets in innings | 4 | 0 | 0 |
| 10 wickets in match | 1 | 0 | 0 |
| Best bowling | 9/52 | 4/35 | 3/30 |
| Catches/stumpings | 32/– | 17/– | 35/– |
- Source: ESPNcricinfo, 11 August 2026

Robert Ian Keogh (born 21 October 1991) is a former English cricketer who played for Northamptonshire. Keogh was a right-handed batsman who bowled right-arm off break.

After playing minor counties cricket for Bedfordshire, Keogh made his first-class debut in August 2012, playing for Northants against Glamorgan. This was his only first-class appearance that season, but the next year he played 8 games. In the match against Hampshire in September 2012, he scored his maiden first-class century, and then progressed to 221, including 32 boundaries before he was out. He has scored at least one century in each subsequent season, but has so far failed to reach the milestone of 1000 runs in a season, his best being 876 runs in 2015, when he played in all 18 of Northants first-class games.

He had previously played for the club in both List A and Twenty20 matches. He made his List A debut in August 2010, opening the batting against Yorkshire. His Twenty20 debut was in the following year. He played for Northants at Twenty20 finals day in 2016, when he finished on the winning side. His best bowling figures in first-class cricket also came in the 2016 season, against Glamorgan when he and Graeme White took all twenty Glamorgan wickets between them. In the first innings, he took 9/52, and took four wickets in the second innings, for match figures of 48.4-17-125-13.

On 14 September 2026, Keogh announced he would retire from professional cricket at the end of that year's county season on medical advice due to a back injury.
