= Hamidullah Qadri =

Afghan cricketer (born 2000)

Personal information
- Born: 5 December 2000 (age 25); Kandahar, Afghanistan
- Batting: Right-handed
- Bowling: Right-arm off break
- Role: Bowler

Domestic team information
- Years: Team
- 2017–2019: Derbyshire (squad no. 75)
- 2020–2024: Kent (squad no. 75)
- 2022/23: Matabeleland Tuskers
- 2025: Norfolk
- FC debut: 26 June 2017 Derbyshire v Glamorgan
- LA debut: 29 May 2017 Derbyshire v South Africa A

Career statistics
Competition	FC	LA	T20
Matches	29	29	3
Runs scored	615	241	–
Batting average	17.57	17.21	–
100s/50s	0/3	0/0	–
Top score	87	43	–
Balls bowled	3,942	1,118	66
Wickets	61	34	1
Bowling average	36.86	31.50	66.00
5 wickets in innings	3	0	0
10 wickets in match	0	0	0
Best bowling	6/129	4/36	1/34
Catches/stumpings	10/–	8/–	0/–
- Source: Cricinfo, 30 September 2024

Hamidullah Qadri (born 5 December 2000) is an Afghan-born English professional cricketer who has played for Kent County Cricket Club, Derbyshire and the England under-19 team.

Born in Afghanistan and moving to England with his family at the age of 10, Qadri made his first-class cricket debut for Derbyshire in June 2017, becoming the first player born in 2000 to appear in the County Championship and Derbyshire's youngest ever first-class player.

== Early life ==
Hamidullah Qadri was born in Kandahar, Afghanistan, on 5 December 2000. When he was aged one, his father left to find work in England due to the War in Afghanistan. The rest of the family were only able to follow and be reunited when Qadri was 10. Having been unfamiliar with cricket in Kandahar, Qadri developed an interest in the sport once the family had settled in Derby, learning about spin bowling from watching videos of famous players. At the age of 12, he was playing first team cricket for Alvaston & Boulton Cricket Club in the Derbyshire Premier Cricket League, alongside former New Zealand player Iain O'Brien. O'Brien nicknamed Qadri "The Magician" and became the youngster's mentor.

== Career ==
Having developed through the Derbyshire Academy, Qadri made his List A debut for the county against South Africa A at Derby on 29 May 2017.

He made his first-class debut for Derbyshire against Glamorgan at Sophia Gardens, Cardiff, in the 2017 County Championship on 26 June 2017, taking five wickets in the second innings. On his debut, he became the first player to be born in the year 2000 to play in the County Championship and the youngest to represent Derbyshire in a first-class match.

He made his Twenty20 debut for Derbyshire in the 2017 NatWest t20 Blast against Lancashire on 16 July 2017.

Qadri was added to England's under-19 squad in July 2017 for their matches against India. He was later named in the England Young Lions squad to play a tri-series against South Africa and Namibia as a warm-up for the 2018 Under-19 World Cup.

In September 2019, Qadri joined Kent County Cricket Club ahead of the 2020 season. The following month, he was named in the England under-19 cricket team's squad for a 50-over tri-series in the Caribbean. In December 2019, he was named in England's squad for the 2020 Under-19 Cricket World Cup.

Qadri left Kent at the end of his contract in October 2024.
