= Joey Evison =

English cricketer (born 2001)

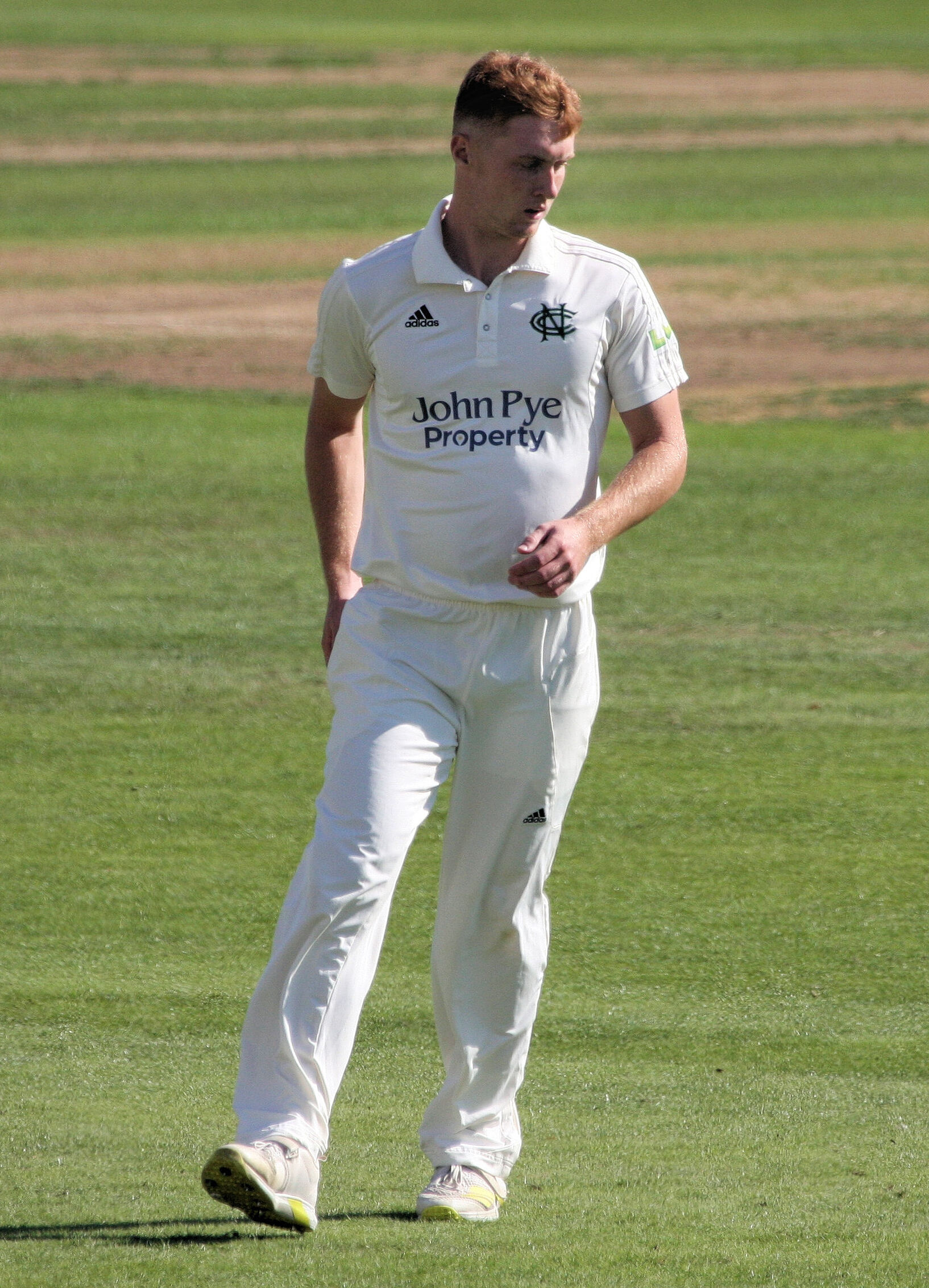
- Evison in 2021

Personal information
- Full name: Joseph David Michael Evison
- Born: 14 November 2001 (age 25); Peterborough, Cambridgeshire, England
- Batting: Right-handed
- Bowling: Right-arm medium
- Role: All-rounder

Domestic team information
- Years: Team
- 2019–2022: Nottinghamshire (squad no. 9)
- 2022: → Leicestershire (on loan)
- 2022: → Kent (on loan) (squad no. 33)
- 2023–2026: Kent (squad no. 33)
- 2026: → Leicestershire (on loan)
- 2026: → Sussex (on loan) (squad no. 50)
- FC debut: 16 September 2019 Notts v Warwickshire
- LA debut: 25 July 2021 Notts v Warwickshire

Career statistics
Competition	FC	LA	T20
Matches	58	37	39
Runs scored	2,565	950	382
Batting average	30.17	29.68	21.22
100s/50s	1/16	2/6	0/0
Top score	109*	136	48*
Balls bowled	6,148	1,020	460
Wickets	94	20	21
Bowling average	38.39	48.85	31.38
5 wickets in innings	1	0	0
10 wickets in match	0	0	0
Best bowling	5/21	3/36	3/25
Catches/stumpings	17/–	13/–	8/–
- Source: Cricinfo, 12 September 2026

Joseph David Michael Evison (born 14 November 2001) is an English cricketer. Educated at Stamford School he is the most recent product of the Lincolnshire development pathway to represent Nottinghamshire, making his first class debut in 2019.

== Career ==
He made his first-class debut on 16 September 2019, for Nottinghamshire in the 2019 County Championship. In October 2019, he was named in the England under-19 cricket team's squad for a 50-over tri-series in the Caribbean.

In December 2019, he was named in England's squad for the 2020 Under-19 Cricket World Cup. He made his List A debut on 25 July 2021, for Nottinghamshire in the 2021 Royal London One-Day Cup. In April 2022, in the opening round of matches in the 2022 County Championship, Evison scored his maiden century in first-class cricket, with 109 not out against Sussex.

He made his Twenty20 debut on 3 July 2022, for Nottinghamshire in the 2022 T20 Blast.

Evison joined Kent in July 2022 and signed a contract extension in July 2025 to keep him at the club until at least the end of the 2027 season. In July 2026, it was announced that Evison would leave Kent at the end of the 2026 county season to join Sussex on a three-year contract.
