= Paul Pollard =

English cricketer

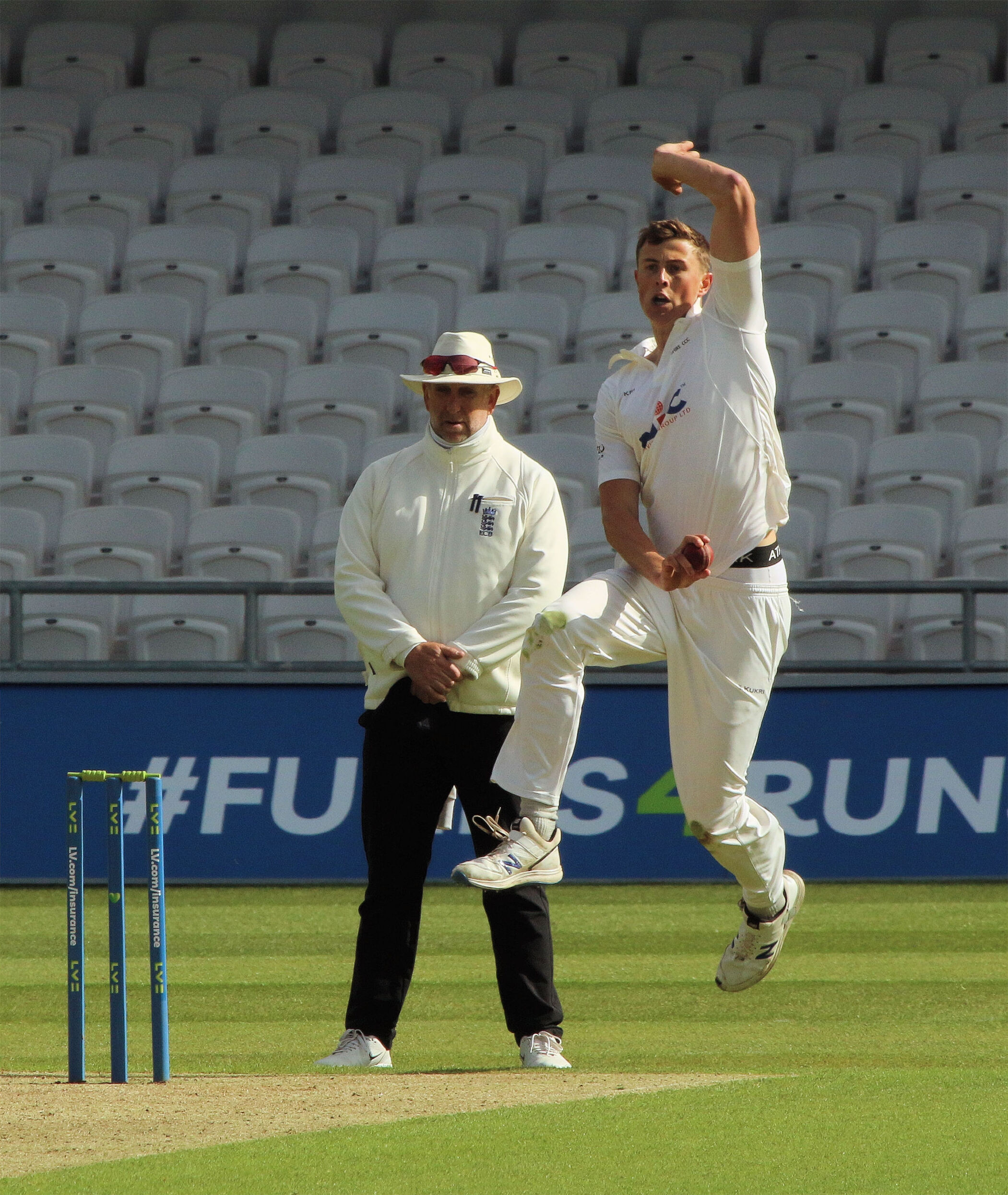
- Pollard (standing) in May 2022

Personal information
- Full name: Paul Raymond Pollard
- Born: 24 September 1968 (age 58); Nottingham, England
- Batting: Left-handed
- Bowling: Right-arm medium

Domestic team information
- Years: Team
- 1987–1998: Nottinghamshire
- 1999–2001: Worcestershire
- 2003: Lincolnshire
- FC debut: 22 July 1987; Nottinghamshire v Derbyshire
- Last FC: 8 September 2001; Worcestershire v Durham
- LA debut: 9 August 1987; Nottinghamshire v Somerset
- Last LA: 28 August 2003; Lincolnshire v Norfolk

Umpiring information
- WODIs umpired: 3 (2021)
- WT20Is umpired: 3 (2022)

Career statistics
Competition	First-class	List A
Matches	192	187
Runs scored	9,685	5,233
Batting average	31.44	33.54
100s/50s	15/48	5/33
Top score	180	132*
Balls bowled	275	18
Wickets	4	0
Bowling average	68.00	–
5 wickets in innings	0	–
10 wickets in match	0	–
Best bowling	2/79	–
Catches/stumpings	158/–	66/–
- Source: CricInfo, 17 September 2021

Paul Raymond Pollard (born 24 September 1968) is an English cricket umpire and former first-class cricketer. As a player, he was an opening batsman who played over 300 games in first-class and List A cricket for Nottinghamshire before a shorter stay with Worcestershire. After retiring from top-line county cricket in 2002, he had one season with Lincolnshire and appeared twice for them in List A matches. His medium-pace bowling was of the occasional variety, and with it he captured four first-class wickets. He has also coached, including in Zimbabwe.

== Playing career ==
Pollard played for Nottinghamshire's Second XI once in 1985, and a number of further times in 1986 and the first part of 1987, but for the most part was notably unsuccessful, repeatedly being dismissed for low scores. However, at the start of July 1987 he scored 110 against Sussex II, and a few weeks later he made his first-class debut against Derbyshire, scoring 31 in his only knock as Nottinghamshire won the game by an innings. He played four more first-class matches and one List A game that season, his highest score being 59 in the Championship match against Lancashire in late July.

Pollard began 1988 in the seconds, but a series of solid scores brought him back into the first team by the second half of May. His best innings that season came in the Championship game at Dartford in early June: Nottinghamshire had been skittled for 65 in their first innings, and went into their second nearly 250 runs behind Kent. Pollard responded with 142, his maiden first-class century, and in the end Kent had to scramble for a two-wicket victory. Thereafter, however, he struggled, and played only two first-team games after June. Pollard ended the summer with just 428 first-class runs from 17 innings, averaging 26.75. In one-day cricket he fared even worse: four innings produced just 85 runs, with no score over 25.

1989, however, was a considerably happier summer for Pollard. For the first time he was a near-regular in the side, and he passed a thousand first-class runs for the first of three times, averaging a little over 33. He scored two hundreds and four fifties, and in June he had an excellent run of form against Kent, making 391 runs against them in five days. In the Championship he made 83 and 131, albeit in a losing cause while in a sandwiched Refuge Assurance League match he scored a match-winning 100, then finally he hit 77 to help Nottinghamshire through to the final of the Benson & Hedges Cup. (He also played in the final, which his county won, but failed personally in making only 2.) For good measure, he hit 153 in his very next innings, against Cambridge University. In List A cricket he was also fairly successful, making two centuries.

Pollard played only the first and last parts of the 1990 season in the first team, but thereafter was a regular choice for several years. His best seasons in first-class cricket were 1991, when he scored 1,255 runs at just over 33; and especially 1993, when he achieved a career-best 1,463 runs at 50.44; that year he topped the Nottinghamshire averages. The 1993 season also saw him make his highest score in first-class cricket, and once again he punished one county particularly: Derbyshire suffered as Pollard scored 180 and 91 in a drawn Championship match, followed immediately by another 91 in an easy AXA Equity and Law League win.

Thereafter, Pollard's first-class figures were never quite as good again, but in the one-day game it was to be 1995 that would prove his most successful season. He scored 882 List A runs that year, by some distance his highest season's aggregate, and made eight half-centuries as well as a single hundred, an innings of 132* against Somerset at Trent Bridge in early June. This century was the culmination of another purple patch: he had made 120 against the same opponents in the Championship a few days earlier, before that 83* versus Scotland in the NatWest Trophy, and before that 75 and 81* against Kent in the Championship.

Pollard's career meandered somewhat for a few years in the late 1990s, and while his performances were far from terrible they were less impressive than might have been expected from an experienced opening batsman: in the three seasons between 1996 and 1998 he scored only one hundred in each of first-class and List A cricket. Seeking a new start he signed for Worcestershire for 1999, but his first summer at New Road was disappointing, Pollard averaging under 20 in first-class cricket, although he was significantly more successful in List A games, with an average there of 41. The following year he made 123* and 69 in a heavy defeat by Kent, and in 2001 he made 131* versus Durham UCCE, but a lengthy career with Worcestershire was not to be: in August 2002, Pollard announced his retirement from the first-class game after a series of injuries. He had one season (2003) at minor counties level with Lincolnshire, for whom he played several sizeable innings, and appeared twice in the C&G Trophy.

== Umpiring career ==
Ahead of the 2012 English cricket season, Pollard was named an ECB reserve umpire. Ahead of the 2018 English cricket season, he was promoted to an ECB first-class umpire. In 2021, he umpired the first Women's One Day International in the series between England and New Zealand.
