= Conor McKerr =

English-South African cricketer (born 1998)

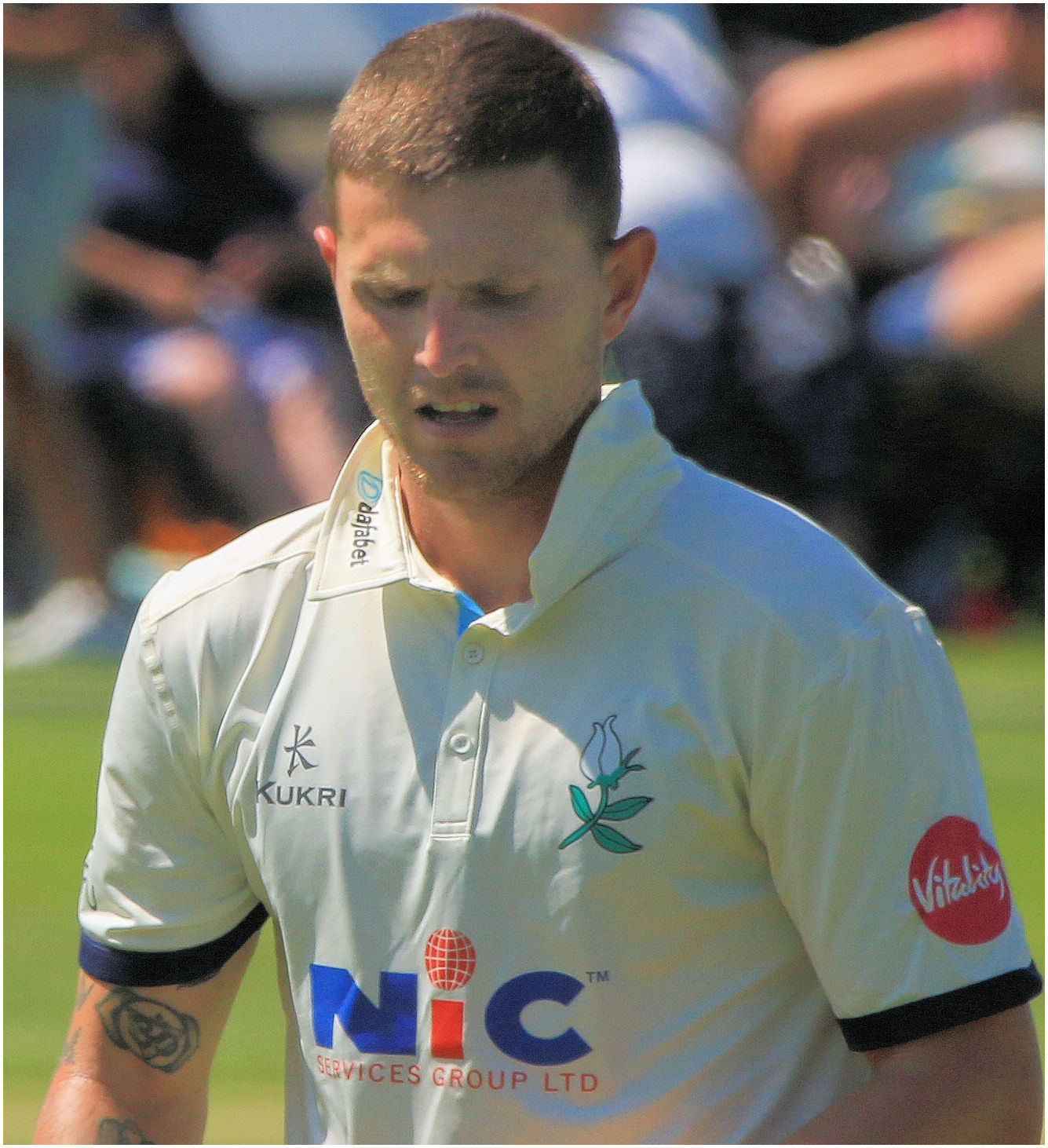
- McKerr in 2024 playing on loan with Yorkshire CCC.

Personal information
- Full name: Conor McKerr
- Born: 19 January 1998 (age 28); Johannesburg, Gauteng, South Africa
- Height: 6 ft 6 in (1.98 m)
- Batting: Right-handed
- Bowling: Right-arm fast
- Role: Bowler

Domestic team information
- Years: Team
- 2017–2024: Surrey (squad no. 83)
- 2017: → Derbyshire (on loan)
- 2021: → Derbyshire (on loan)
- 2022: → Kent (on loan)
- 2023: → Kent (on loan)
- 2023: → Nottinghamshire (on loan)
- 2023: → Derbyshire (on loan)
- 2024: → Yorkshire (on loan)
- 2025: Nottinghamshire (squad no. 3)
- FC debut: 2 June 2017 Derbyshire v Nottinghamshire
- LA debut: 23 April 2019 Surrey v Essex

Career statistics
Competition	FC	LA	T20
Matches	26	39	26
Runs scored	284	393	53
Batting average	12.34	16.37	7.57
100s/50s	0/0	0/1	0/0
Top score	37	71	10
Balls bowled	3,153	1,768	432
Wickets	62	60	20
Bowling average	31.08	30.48	38.65
5 wickets in innings	2	0	0
10 wickets in match	1	0	0
Best bowling	5/54	4/32	2/19
Catches/stumpings	8/–	6/–	9/–
- Source: ESPNcricinfo, 21 June 2025

Conor McKerr (born 19 January 1998) is an English-South African cricketer who plays county cricket in England for Nottinghamshire County Cricket Club. McKerr holds a British passport. He made his first-class debut on loan from Surrey to Derbyshire in 2017.

== Career ==
Conor McKerr was born in Johannesburg, Gauteng, on 19 January 1998. He was a member of the South Africa under-19 squad for the 2016 Under-19 Cricket World Cup in Bangladesh. He left South Africa to sign for Surrey in March 2016, with the intention of qualifying to play for England. On 31 May 2017, he joined Derbyshire on a one-month loan from Surrey. He made his first-class debut for Derbyshire in the 2017 County Championship on 2 June 2017, taking four wickets in the match against Nottinghamshire. On his second Championship appearance for Derbyshire, against Northamptonshire, McKerr finished with bowling figures of 5/87 and 5/54, becoming the youngest bowler to take ten wickets in a match for the county. This proved to be his final appearance for Derbyshire, as he was recalled by Surrey on 12 June.

He made his List A debut on 23 April 2019, for Surrey in the 2019 Royal London One-Day Cup. He made his Twenty20 debut on 15 June 2021, for Derbyshire in the 2021 T20 Blast. In 2022 he played two matches on loan at Kent at the end of the season. The following season McKerr rejoined Kent on loan for two matches in April.

On 3 October 2024 it was announced McKerr had left Surrey. The following day he signed a three-year contract with Nottinghamshire.
