= 2019 County Championship =

Cricket tournament

- Tournament logo
- Dates: 5 April – 26 September 2019
- Administrator: England and Wales Cricket Board
- Cricket format: First-class cricket (4 days)
- Tournament format: League system
- Champions: Essex
- Participants: 18
- Most runs: Dom Sibley (1,324) (Div 1); Hassan Azad (1,189) (Div 2)
- Most wickets: Simon Harmer (83) (Div 1); Chris Rushworth (69) (Div 2)

The 2019 County Championship, known for sponsorship reasons as the 2019 Specsavers County Championship, was the 120th cricket County Championship season. As in 2018, Division One had eight teams and Division Two had ten teams. The first round of matches began on 5 April and the final round of matches ended on 26 September. Surrey were the defending champions. At the end of the 2019 season only one team was relegated with three promoted. Therefore, from 2020 onwards, Division One would feature ten teams and Division Two would feature eight. (Note: Due to the impact of the COVID-19 pandemic on cricket, the format of the 2020 and 2021 County cricket seasons was subsequently altered.)

== Teams ==
Home grounds of each county

=== Division One ===
Team promoted from Division Two in 2018

Team	Primary home ground	Other grounds	Coach	Captain	Overseas player(s)
Essex	County Ground, Chelmsford	—	(England) Anthony McGrath	(Netherlands) Ryan ten Doeschate	(Australia) Peter Siddle (Pakistan) Mohammad Amir
Hampshire	Rose Bowl, Southampton	Newclose County Cricket Ground, Isle of Wight	(South Africa) Adrian Birrell	(England) James Vince (Apr.–May., Aug.–) (England) Sam Northeast (May.–Aug.)	(South Africa) Aiden Markram (Apr.–May.) (India) Ajinkya Rahane
Kent	St Lawrence Ground, Canterbury	County Ground, Beckenham; Nevill Ground, Royal Tunbridge Wells	(England) Matt Walker	(South Africa) Heino Kuhn	(Australia) Matt Renshaw (South Africa) Wiaan Mulder (South Africa) Faf du Plessis
Nottinghamshire	Trent Bridge, Nottingham	John Fretwell Sporting Complex, Nettleworth	(England) Peter Moores	(England) Steven Mullaney	(Australia) James Pattinson (India) Ravichandran Ashwin
Somerset	County Ground, Taunton	—	(England) Jason Kerr	(England) Tom Abell	(Pakistan) Azhar Ali (Pakistan) Babar Azam (India) Murali Vijay
Surrey	The Oval, London	Woodbridge Road, Guildford	(Australia) Michael Di Venuto	(England) Rory Burns	(South Africa) Dean Elgar (Australia) Aaron Finch
Warwickshire	Edgbaston, Birmingham	—	(England) Jim Troughton	(New Zealand) Jeetan Patel	(New Zealand) Jeetan Patel
Yorkshire	Headingley, Leeds	North Marine Road Ground, Scarborough; Clifton Park Ground, York	(England) Andrew Gale	(England) Steven Patterson	(South Africa) Keshav Maharaj (New Zealand) Ajaz Patel

=== Division Two ===
Team relegated from Division One in 2018

Team	Primary home ground	Other grounds	Coach	Captain	Overseas player(s)
Derbyshire	County Ground, Derby	Queen's Park, Chesterfield	(Zimbabwe) Dave Houghton	(England) Billy Godleman	(Netherlands) Logan van Beek
Durham	Riverside Ground, Chester-le-Street	—	(New Zealand) James Franklin	(Australia) Cameron Bancroft	(Australia) Cameron Bancroft (Australia) Peter Handscomb (New Zealand) BJ Watling
Glamorgan	Sophia Gardens, Cardiff	Penrhyn Avenue, Rhos-on-Sea; Spytty Park, Newport; St Helen's, Swansea	(England) Matthew Maynard	(South Africa) Chris Cooke	(Australia) Marnus Labuschagne (Australia) Shaun Marsh (Cricket West Indies) Kraigg Brathwaite
Gloucestershire	County Ground, Bristol	College Ground, Cheltenham	(England) Richard Dawson	(England) Chris Dent	(Australia) Daniel Worrall (Australia) Chadd Sayers (Cricket West Indies) Shannon Gabriel
Lancashire	Old Trafford, Manchester	Aigburth Cricket Ground, Liverpool; Sedbergh School, Sedbergh	(England) Glen Chapple	(South Africa) Dane Vilas	(Australia) Glenn Maxwell (Australia) Joe Burns (Australia) Jake Lehmann
Leicestershire	Grace Road, Leicester	—	(England) Paul Nixon	(England) Paul Horton	(Pakistan) Mohammad Abbas
Middlesex	Lord's, London	Brunton Memorial Ground, Radlett; Merchant Taylors' School Ground, Northwood	(Australia) Stuart Law	(England) Dawid Malan	(Cricket West Indies) Miguel Cummins
Northamptonshire	County Ground, Northampton	—	(England) David Ripley	(England) Alex Wakely	(Cricket West Indies) Jason Holder (South Africa) Temba Bavuma (South Africa) Dwaine Pretorius (New Zealand) Doug Bracewell
Sussex	County Ground, Hove	Arundel Castle Cricket Club Ground, Arundel	(Australia) Jason Gillespie	(England) Ben Brown	(Pakistan) Mir Hamza (Australia) Alex Carey
Worcestershire	New Road, Worcester	Chester Road North Ground, Kidderminster	(England) Alex Gidman	(England) Joe Leach	(New Zealand) Hamish Rutherford (Australia) Callum Ferguson

== Results ==
Fixtures for the 2019 County Championship were announced on 26 November 2018, with the previous season's champions Surrey beginning the defence of their title against Essex at The Oval.

=== Division One ===
==== April ====
5–8 April 2019	Hampshire (H)	v	Essex	Hampshire won by an innings and 87 runs
Scorecard	525/8d (130.5 overs); Sam Northeast 169 (255); Matt Quinn 3/104 (29 overs)		164 (58.3 overs); Alastair Cook 50 (82); Fidel Edwards 5/51 (14.3 overs)	Rose Bowl, West End, Southampton; Umpires: Neil Mallender and Martin Saggers
Scorecard			274 (89.1 overs) (f/o); Ravi Bopara 107 (191); Kyle Abbott 5/77 (19.1 overs)	Rose Bowl, West End, Southampton; Umpires: Neil Mallender and Martin Saggers
Toss uncontested, Essex elected to field first.; Adam Wheater (Essex) was unable to bat in either innings due to an injury.; Points: Hampshire 24, Essex 1.

5–8 April 2019	Nottinghamshire (H)	v	Yorkshire	Match drawn
Scorecard	408 (120.3 overs); Joe Clarke 112 (190); Duanne Olivier 5/96 (28 overs)		291 (82.3 overs); Adam Lyth 81 (129); Samit Patel 3/31 (9 overs)	Trent Bridge, West Bridgford, Nottingham; Umpires: David Millns and Russell Warren
Scorecard	329/5d (70 overs); Joe Clarke 97* (125); Duanne Olivier 2/66 (14 overs)		277/2 (78.2 overs); Joe Root 130* (189); Jake Ball 2/73 (18 overs)	Trent Bridge, West Bridgford, Nottingham; Umpires: David Millns and Russell Warren
Toss uncontested, Yorkshire elected to field first.; Points: Nottinghamshire 12, Yorkshire 9.

5–8 April 2019	Somerset (H)	v	Kent	Somerset won by 74 runs
Scorecard	171 (48 overs); Tom Abell 49 (80); Mitchell Claydon 5/46 (12 overs)		209 (73.5 overs); Sean Dickson 43 (107); Lewis Gregory 3/26 (17 overs)	County Ground, Taunton; Umpires: Richard Illingworth and Rob Bailey
Scorecard	243 (71.3 overs); George Bartlett 63 (110); Mitchell Claydon 4/66 (18 overs)		131 (46 overs); Darren Stevens 43* (82); Lewis Gregory 5/18 (13 overs)	County Ground, Taunton; Umpires: Richard Illingworth and Rob Bailey
Toss uncontested, Kent elected to field first.; No play was possible on day one due to rain.; Points: Somerset 19, Kent 4.

11–14 April 2019	Yorkshire	v	Hampshire (H)	Yorkshire won by an innings and 44 runs
Scorecard	554/7d (164 overs); Gary Ballance 148 (308); Liam Dawson 3/184 (60 overs)		302 (94.3 overs); Sam Northeast 99 (202); Duanne Olivier 3/89 (21 overs)	Rose Bowl, West End, Southampton; Umpires: Jeff Evans and Alex Wharf
Scorecard			208 (71.4 overs) (f/o); Liam Dawson 92 (167); Steven Patterson 4/47 (18 overs)	Rose Bowl, West End, Southampton; Umpires: Jeff Evans and Alex Wharf
Yorkshire won the toss and elected to bat.; Points: Yorkshire 23, Hampshire 4.

11–13 April 2019	Nottinghamshire (H)	v	Somerset	Somerset won by an innings and 14 runs
Scorecard	263 (66.4 overs); Chris Nash 58 (72); Lewis Gregory 6/68 (16.4 overs)		403 (108.1 overs); George Bartlett 133 (223); Stuart Broad 5/73 (25.1 overs)	Trent Bridge, West Bridgford, Nottingham; Umpires: Michael Gough and Steve O'Shaughnessy
Scorecard	126 (59.1 overs); Ben Slater 34 (90); Jack Leach 6/36 (17 overs)			Trent Bridge, West Bridgford, Nottingham; Umpires: Michael Gough and Steve O'Shaughnessy
Toss uncontested, Somerset elected to field first.; Points: Somerset 24, Nottinghamshire 4.

11–14 April 2019	Surrey (H)	v	Essex	Match drawn
Scorecard	395 (114.1 overs); Ryan Patel 100* (278); Peter Siddle 6/104 (32 overs)		448 (119.4 overs); Ryan ten Doeschate 130 (166); Morne Morkel 3/97 (27 overs)	The Oval, Kennington, London; Umpires: Richard Kettleborough and Nick Cook
Scorecard	324/6d (27.4 overs); Rory Burns 98 (166); Simon Harmer 5/88 (36 overs)		0/0 (1 over)	The Oval, Kennington, London; Umpires: Richard Kettleborough and Nick Cook
Surrey won the toss and elected to bat.; Points: Essex 13, Surrey 11.

11–14 April 2019	Kent	v	Warwickshire (H)	Kent won by 8 wickets
Scorecard	504/9d (136.5 overs); Ollie Robinson 143 (228); Jeetan Patel 3/113 (35.5 overs)		346 (120 overs); Dom Sibley 132 (315); Matt Milnes 3/50 (22 overs)	Edgbaston Cricket Ground, Edgbaston, Birmingham; Umpires: Neil Mallender and Richard Illingworth
Scorecard	124/2 (19.4 overs); Matt Renshaw 48* (50); Jeetan Patel 1/25 (5 overs)		280 (93.1 overs) (f/o); Tim Ambrose 107 (195); Harry Podmore 5/62 (29 overs)	Edgbaston Cricket Ground, Edgbaston, Birmingham; Umpires: Neil Mallender and Richard Illingworth
Kent won the toss and elected to bat.; Points: Kent 24, Warwickshire 4.

==== May ====
14–16 May 2019	Nottinghamshire	v	Essex (H)	Essex won by 8 wickets
Scorecard	187 (72.3 overs); Joe Clarke 48 (102); Jamie Porter 4/75 (18 overs)		241 (82.1 overs); Nick Browne 67 (168); Luke Fletcher 5/50 (24.1 overs)	County Ground, Chelmsford; Umpires: Neil Mallender and Jeremy Lloyds
Scorecard	158 (54.3 overs); Ben Duckett 37 (58); Simon Harmer 6/60 (22 overs)		105/2 (34.4 overs); Tom Westley 49 (82); Samit Patel 1/18 (6.4 overs)	County Ground, Chelmsford; Umpires: Neil Mallender and Jeremy Lloyds
Nottinghamshire won the toss and elected to bat.; Points: Essex 20, Nottinghamshire 3.

14–17 May 2019	Yorkshire	v	Kent (H)	Yorkshire won by 172 runs
Scorecard	210 (56.2 overs); Harry Brook 29 (26); Matt Milnes 3/63 (16 overs)		296 (87 overs); Ollie Robinson 103 (181); Ben Coad 3/66 (21 overs)	St Lawrence Ground, Canterbury; Umpires: Paul Pollard and Mike Burns
Scorecard	469 (131.1 overs); Gary Ballance 159 (291); Mitchell Claydon 3/83 (27 overs)		211 (88.5 overs); Daniel Bell-Drummond 41 (121); Ben Coad 6/52 (24.5 overs)	St Lawrence Ground, Canterbury; Umpires: Paul Pollard and Mike Burns
Yorkshire won the toss and elected to bat.; Points: Yorkshire 20, Kent 5.

14–17 May 2019	Surrey	v	Somerset (H)	Match drawn
Scorecard	380 (122 overs); Rory Burns 107 (188); Lewis Gregory 3/52 (22 overs)		398 (106.3 overs); Lewis Gregory 129* (153); Rikki Clarke 3/74 (19.3 overs)	County Ground, Taunton; Umpires: David Millns and Nick Cook
Scorecard	255/8 (89 overs); Rory Burns 78 (153); Jack Leach 3/70 (33 overs)			County Ground, Taunton; Umpires: David Millns and Nick Cook
Surrey won the toss and elected to bat.; Points: Surrey 12, Somerset 11.

14–17 May 2019	Hampshire	v	Warwickshire (H)	Hampshire won by 314 runs
Scorecard	354 (117.3 overs); Tom Alsop 150 (317); Jeetan Patel 6/94 (40.3 overs)		233 (92.5 overs); Dom Sibley 109* (263); Kyle Abbott 4/50 (21 overs)	Edgbaston Cricket Ground, Edgbaston, Birmingham; Umpires: Peter Hartley and Ben Debenham
Scorecard	302/5d (50 overs); Rilee Rossouw 76 (46); Jeetan Patel 2/107 (21 overs)		109 (53.5 overs); Robert Yates 21 (57); Fidel Edwards 3/36 (12.5 overs)	Edgbaston Cricket Ground, Edgbaston, Birmingham; Umpires: Peter Hartley and Ben Debenham
Hampshire won the toss and elected to bat.; Robert Yates (Warwickshire) made his first-class debut.; Points: Hampshire 22, Warwickshire 3.

20–23 May 2019	Hampshire (H)	v	Nottinghamshire	Hampshire won by 244 runs
Scorecard	310 (103.3 overs); Joe Weatherley 66 (134); Luke Fletcher 4/79 (24.3 overs)		239 (77.1 overs); Steven Mullaney 102 (173); Keith Barker 3/46 (16 overs)	Newclose County Cricket Ground, Newport, Isle of Wight; Umpires: Mike Burns and David Millns
Scorecard	367/5d (85 overs); Sam Northeast 133 (186); Steven Mullaney 2/78 (22 overs)		194 (66.5 overs); Chris Nash 60 (118); Fidel Edwards 3/37 (14 overs)	Newclose County Cricket Ground, Newport, Isle of Wight; Umpires: Mike Burns and David Millns
Toss uncontested, Nottinghamshire elected to field first.; Mason Crane replaced Liam Dawson for Hampshire from day two onwards due to Dawson's inclusion for England's World Cup squad.; Points: Hampshire 22, Nottinghamshire 4.

20–23 May 2019	Surrey	v	Kent (H)	Match drawn
Scorecard	439 (98.1 overs); Will Jacks 120 (194); Wiaan Mulder 4/118 (22 overs)		294 (85.5 overs); Sean Dickson 128 (237); Gareth Batty 3/49 (12 overs)	County Ground, Beckenham, London; Umpires: Graham Lloyd and Alex Wharf
Scorecard	280 (79.5 overs); Sam Curran 80 (119); Matt Milnes 4/74 (17.5 overs)		352/8 (113 overs); Sean Dickson 91 (178); Rikki Clarke 3/67 (25 overs)	County Ground, Beckenham, London; Umpires: Graham Lloyd and Alex Wharf
Surrey won the toss and elected to bat.; Points: Surrey 13, Kent 10.

20–22 May 2019	Somerset (H)	v	Warwickshire	Somerset won by 49 runs
Scorecard	209 (47.2 overs); Josh Davey 36 (56); Oliver Hannon-Dalby 5/18 (11.2 overs)		135 (54.1 overs); Liam Banks 26 (78); Craig Overton 5/31 (16.1 overs)	County Ground, Taunton; Umpires: Neil Mallender and Jeremy Lloyds
Scorecard	164 (41.5 overs); Craig Overton 36* (64); Liam Norwell 7/41 (12.5 overs)		189 (71.4 overs); Sam Hain 92* (175); Lewis Gregory 4/48 (14.4 overs)	County Ground, Taunton; Umpires: Neil Mallender and Jeremy Lloyds
Toss uncontested, Warwickshire elected to field first.; Points: Somerset 20, Warwickshire 3.

27–30 May 2019	Essex (H)	v	Kent	Essex won by 113 runs
Scorecard	313 (101.2 overs); Alastair Cook 125 (242); Matt Milnes 4/61 (21.2 overs)		182 (88.2 overs); Daniel Bell-Drummond 28 (82); Peter Siddle 3/29 (17 overs)	County Ground, Chelmsford; Umpires: Tim Robinson and Mike Burns
Scorecard	206/7d (63 overs); Alastair Cook 90 (160); Matt Milnes 2/47 (12 overs)		224 (73.5 overs); Daniel Bell-Drummond 81 (176); Simon Harmer 8/98 (32.5 overs)	County Ground, Chelmsford; Umpires: Tim Robinson and Mike Burns
Toss uncontested, Kent elected to field first.; Points: Essex 22, Kent 3.

27–30 May 2019	Warwickshire (H)	v	Surrey	Warwickshire won by 130 runs
Scorecard	293 (91 overs); Liam Norwell 64 (53); Matt Dunn 3/65 (24 overs)		188 (69.2 overs); Ben Foakes 57* (88); Jeetan Patel 4/53 (31 overs)	Edgbaston, Birmingham; Umpires: Steve O'Shaughnessy and Ian Blackwell
Scorecard	166/9d (53.4 overs); Will Rhodes 54 (125); Gareth Batty 8/64 (22.4 overs)		141 (63.4 overs); Rikki Clarke 51* (101); Jeetan Patel 8/36 (31 overs)	Edgbaston, Birmingham; Umpires: Steve O'Shaughnessy and Ian Blackwell
Toss uncontested, Surrey elected to field first.; Points: Warwickshire 21, Surrey 3.

27–30 May 2019	Yorkshire (H)	v	Hampshire	Match drawn
Scorecard	181 (56.2 overs); Tom Kohler-Cadmore 45 (105); Fidel Edwards 5/49 (15 overs)		235 (74.1 overs); James Fuller 54* (74); Ben Coad 4/41 (19.1 overs)	Headingley, Leeds; Umpires: Neil Bainton and Rob Bailey
Scorecard	332/5d (91 overs); Gary Ballance 100 (170); Keith Barker 3/64 (26 overs)		158/5 (46 overs); Joe Weatherley 66 (108); Dom Bess 2/24 (13 overs)	Headingley, Leeds; Umpires: Neil Bainton and Rob Bailey
Yorkshire won the toss and elected to bat.; Points: Hampshire 9, Yorkshire 8.

==== June ====
3–6 June 2019	Somerset	v	Surrey (H)	Somerset won by 102 runs
Scorecard	344 (92 overs); George Bartlett 137 (213); Morne Morkel 4/64 (22 overs)		231 (73 overs); Ryan Patel 63 (111); Craig Overton 5/38 (20 overs)	Woodbridge Road, Guildford; Umpires: Peter Hartley and Paul Baldwin
Scorecard	153 (49.2 overs); James Hildreth 64 (80); Matt Dunn 5/43 (15.2 overs)		164 (56.3 overs); Rory Burns 48 (99); Jack Brooks 5/33 (13 overs)	Woodbridge Road, Guildford; Umpires: Peter Hartley and Paul Baldwin
Somerset won the toss and elected to bat.; Points: Somerset 22, Surrey 4.

3–6 June 2019	Warwickshire (H)	v	Nottinghamshire	Match drawn
Scorecard	391/9d (146.5 overs); Adam Hose 111 (202); Luke Fletcher 3/65 (32 overs)		97 (44.4 overs); Chris Nash 25 (41); Jeetan Patel 6/16 (13.4 overs)	Edgbaston, Birmingham; Umpires: Tim Robinson and Martin Saggers
Scorecard			354/8 (124 overs) (f/o); Ben Duckett 140 (237); Jeetan Patel 4/72 (47 overs)	Edgbaston, Birmingham; Umpires: Tim Robinson and Martin Saggers
Warwickshire won the toss and elected to bat.; Points: Warwickshire 9, Nottinghamshire 6.

3–6 June 2019	Yorkshire (H)	v	Essex	Match drawn
Scorecard	390 (125.4 overs); Adam Lyth 95 (198); Jamie Porter 3/84 (28 overs)		309 (116.5 overs); Tom Westley 77 (146); Dom Bess 3/45 (26 overs)	Headingley, Leeds; Umpires: Neil Mallender and Steve O'Shaughnessy
Scorecard	107/1 (42.5 overs); Adam Lyth 56* (144); Jamie Porter 1/30 (9.5 overs)			Headingley, Leeds; Umpires: Neil Mallender and Steve O'Shaughnessy
Yorkshire won the toss and elected to bat.; Will Buttleman (Essex) made his first-class debut.; Points: Yorkshire 11, Essex 9.

9–12 June 2019	Nottinghamshire (H)	v	Hampshire	Match drawn
Scorecard	162 (60.2 overs); Steven Mullaney 45 (114); Kyle Abbott 6/37 (14 overs)		93/2 (33 overs); Joe Weatherley 47* (93); Luke Fletcher 1/10 (7 overs)	John Fretwell Sporting Complex, Nettleworth; Umpires: Paul Pollard and Nick Cook
Toss uncontested, Hampshire elected to field first.; Points: Hampshire 8, Nottinghamshire 5.

10–13 June 2019	Kent (H)	v	Somerset	Somerset won by 10 wickets
Scorecard	139 (41 overs); Ollie Robinson 37 (61); Lewis Gregory 6/32 (13.1 overs)		169 (46.2 overs); Tom Banton 63 (119); Grant Stewart 3/37 (12 overs)	St Lawrence Ground, Canterbury; Umpires: Billy Taylor and Martin Saggers
Scorecard	59 (26.1 overs); Sean Dickson 22 (55); Lewis Gregory 5/21 (13.1 overs)		30/0 (6.4 overs); Tom Abell 15* (20)	St Lawrence Ground, Canterbury; Umpires: Billy Taylor and Martin Saggers
Toss uncontested, Somerset elected to field first.; Points: Somerset 19, Kent 3.

10–13 June 2019	Surrey (H)	v	Yorkshire	Match drawn
Scorecard	313 (100.4 overs); Ben Foakes 62 (115); Steven Patterson 5/81 (26.4 overs)		148 (48 overs); Jordan Thompson 34 (44); Morne Morkel 4/43 (16 overs)	Woodbridge Road, Guildford; Umpires: Tim Robinson and Jeremy Lloyds
Scorecard			30/0 (13.3 overs) (f/o); Adam Lyth 15* (41)	Woodbridge Road, Guildford; Umpires: Tim Robinson and Jeremy Lloyds
Toss uncontested, Surrey elected to field first.; Jordan Thompson (Yorkshire) made his first-class debut.; Points: Surrey 11, Yorkshire 8.

16–17 June 2019	Hampshire	v	Essex (H)	Essex won by an innings and 8 runs
Scorecard	118 (34 overs); Rilee Rossouw 34 (32); Simon Harmer 5/23 (11 overs)		214 (73.1 overs); Ravi Bopara 59 (103); Kyle Abbott 4/54 (19.1 overs)	County Ground, Chelmsford; Umpires: Billy Taylor and Peter Hartley
Scorecard	88 (29.5 overs); Joe Weatherley 29* (80); Simon Harmer 7/38 (13.1 overs)			County Ground, Chelmsford; Umpires: Billy Taylor and Peter Hartley
Hampshire won the toss and elected to bat.; Points: Essex 20, Hampshire 3.

17–20 June 2019	Kent (H)	v	Nottinghamshire	Kent won by 285 runs
Scorecard	309 (83.1 overs); Zak Crawley 111 (173); James Pattinson 6/73 (21 overs)		267 (102.5 overs); Chris Nash 67 (168); Matt Milnes 5/68 (23 overs)	Nevill Ground, Royal Tunbridge Wells; Umpires: Neil Mallender and Steve O'Shaughnessy
Scorecard	363/5d (70 overs); Joe Denly 167* (206); James Pattinson 2/67 (17 overs)		120 (60.1 overs); Ben Duckett 23 (17); Harry Podmore 5/41 (16 overs)	Nevill Ground, Royal Tunbridge Wells; Umpires: Neil Mallender and Steve O'Shaughnessy
Toss uncontested, Nottinghamshire elected to field first.; Points: Kent 22, Nottinghamshire 5.

17–20 June 2019	Yorkshire (H)	v	Warwickshire	Warwickshire won by 3 wickets
Scorecard	259 (92.4 overs); Steven Patterson 60 (108); Oliver Hannon-Dalby 5/76 (26.4 overs)		254 (98.2 overs); Dom Sibley 67 (166); Steven Patterson 3/33 (23 overs)	Clifton Park Ground, York; Umpires: Jeff Evans and David Millns
Scorecard	211 (81 overs); Jack Leaning 65 (187); Jeetan Patel 4/48 (31 overs)		219/7 (66 overs); Will Rhodes 83 (107); James Logan 4/22 (13 overs)	Clifton Park Ground, York; Umpires: Jeff Evans and David Millns
Toss uncontested, Warwickshire elected to field first.; Points: Warwickshire 21, Yorkshire 5.

23–25 June 2019	Essex (H)	v	Somerset	Essex won by 151 runs
Scorecard	216 (77.3 overs); Alastair Cook 80 (186); Jack Leach 3/30 (16.3 overs)		131 (48.5 overs); Tom Abell 36 (78); Jamie Porter 5/51 (19.5 overs)	County Ground, Chelmsford; Umpires: Graham Lloyd and Nick Cook
Scorecard	183 (53.3 overs); Alastair Cook 47 (94); Tim Groenewald 5/51 (14.3 overs)		117 (32.2 overs); Lewis Gregory 40 (34); Jamie Porter 4/22 (9 overs)	County Ground, Chelmsford; Umpires: Graham Lloyd and Nick Cook
Essex won the toss and elected to bat.; Points: Essex 20, Somerset 3.

23–26 June 2019	Surrey (H)	v	Warwickshire	Surrey won by 74 runs
Scorecard	194 (56.3 overs); Mark Stoneman 33 (68); Toby Lester 4/41 (15 overs)		230 (76.1 overs); Will Rhodes 51 (64); Sam Curran 3/50 (17 overs)	The Oval, London; Umpires: James Middlebrook and Martin Saggers
Scorecard	325 (80 overs); Mark Stoneman 71 (85); Craig Miles 5/91 (18 overs)		215 (74.2 overs); Dom Sibley 73 (165); Gareth Batty 4/34 (17.2 overs)	The Oval, London; Umpires: James Middlebrook and Martin Saggers
Toss uncontested, Warwickshire elected to field first.; Points: Surrey 19, Warwickshire 4.

30 June-3 July 2019	Kent (H)	v	Warwickshire	Match drawn
Scorecard	585/7d (144.1 overs); Daniel Bell-Drummond 166 (256); James Wainman 3/112 (23 overs)		574/7d (218 overs); Dom Sibley 244 (491); Grant Stewart 2/120 (34 overs)	St Lawrence Ground, Canterbury; Umpires: Ben Debenham and Nick Cook
Kent won the toss and elected to bat.; James Wainman (Warwickshire) made his first-class debut.; Points: Kent 10, Warwickshire 9.

30 June-3 July 2019	Nottinghamshire (H)	v	Essex	Essex won by an innings and 123 runs
Scorecard	213 (69.1 overs); Steven Mullaney 74 (135); Peter Siddle 3/38 (19.1 overs)		519/9d (167.4 overs); Nick Browne 163 (370); Stuart Broad 3/75 (33 overs)	Trent Bridge, Nottingham; Umpires: Billy Taylor and Mike Burns
Scorecard	183 (89.2 overs); Ben Duckett 39 (87); Simon Harmer 4/35 (40 overs)			Trent Bridge, Nottingham; Umpires: Billy Taylor and Mike Burns
Nottinghamshire won the toss and elected to bat.; Points: Essex 22, Nottinghamshire 2.

30 June-3 July 2019	Somerset (H)	v	Hampshire	Somerset won by 313 runs
Scorecard	408 (87.5 overs); James Hildreth 105 (129); Kyle Abbott 6/84 (17.5 overs)		349 (106.3 overs); Sam Northeast 101 (175); Jamie Overton 5/70 (23 overs)	County Ground, Taunton; Umpires: David Millns and Russell Warren
Scorecard	358/8d (83 overs); Azhar Ali 79 (125); Mason Crane 3/122 (24 overs)		104 (34.2 overs); James Fuller 35 (65); Jack Leach 3/14 (10 overs)	County Ground, Taunton; Umpires: David Millns and Russell Warren
Somerset won the toss and elected to bat.; Joe Weatherley (Hampshire) was unable to bat in the second innings due to an injury.; Points: Somerset 24, Hampshire 6.

30 June-3 July 2019	Yorkshire (H)	v	Surrey	Yorkshire won by 123 runs
Scorecard	327 (79.2 overs); Will Fraine 106 (149); Jordan Clark 5/77 (17.4 overs)		362 (107.4 overs); Mark Stoneman 100 (167); Ben Coad 3/60 (21 overs)	North Marine Road Ground, Scarborough; Umpires: Alex Wharf and Ian Blackwell
Scorecard	352 (106.1 overs); Adam Lyth 68 (171); Sam Curran 3/90 (26 overs)		194 (81.2 overs); Dean Elgar 71 (154); Keshav Maharaj 3/69 (33 overs)	North Marine Road Ground, Scarborough; Umpires: Alex Wharf and Ian Blackwell
Yorkshire won the toss and elected to bat.; Points: Yorkshire 22, Surrey 7.

==== July ====
6–9 July 2019	Hampshire (H)	v	Warwickshire	Match drawn
Scorecard	539 (115.3 overs); Aneurin Donald 173 (144); Olly Stone 5/93 (21.3 overs)		307 (118.5 overs); Sam Hain 129* (244); Felix Organ 2/19 (9.5 overs)	Rose Bowl, Southampton; Umpires: Jeff Evans and Alex Wharf
Scorecard	171/8d (35.5 overs); Aneurin Donald 52 (46); Oliver Hannon-Dalby 3/29 (7 overs)		347/8 (106.5 overs); Sam Hain 104 (193); Kyle Abbott 5/78 (23 overs)	Rose Bowl, Southampton; Umpires: Jeff Evans and Alex Wharf
Toss uncontested, Warwickshire elected to field first.; Points: Hampshire 12, Warwickshire 9.

7–9 July 2019	Yorkshire	v	Essex (H)	Essex won by 8 wickets
Scorecard	208 (49.3 overs); Harry Brook 46 (60); Simon Harmer 5/76 (18.3 overs)		328 (117 overs); Tom Westley 81 (209); Matthew Fisher 3/59 (22 overs)	County Ground, Chelmsford; Umpires: Paul Pollard and Rob Bailey
Scorecard	211 (72.4 overs); Keshav Maharaj 85 (71); Peter Siddle 4/32 (21 overs)		94/2 (21.5 overs); Nick Browne 33* (64); Steven Patterson 1/19 (8 overs)	County Ground, Chelmsford; Umpires: Paul Pollard and Rob Bailey
Yorkshire won the toss and elected to bat.; Points: Essex 22, Yorkshire 3.

7–9 July 2019	Somerset (H)	v	Nottinghamshire	Somerset won by 132 runs
Scorecard	326 (94.3 overs); Steven Davies 74 (154); Luke Wood 4/85 (23 overs)		241 (88.1 overs); Jake Libby 77 (192); Dom Bess 5/59 (25.1 overs)	County Ground, Taunton; Umpires: Ben Debenham and Nick Cook
Scorecard	169 (59.4 overs); Azhar Ali 65* (184); Ravichandran Ashwin 5/59 (30 overs)		122 (43.5 overs); Ravichandran Ashwin 41 (104); Jamie Overton 4/24 (7.5 overs)	County Ground, Taunton; Umpires: Ben Debenham and Nick Cook
Somerset won the toss and elected to bat.; Liam Patterson-White (Nottinghamshire) made his first-class debut.; Chris Nash (Nottinghamshire) was unable to bat in the second innings due to an injury and was replaced in the team by Samit Patel.; Points: Somerset 22, Nottinghamshire 4.

7–10 July 2019	Surrey (H)	v	Kent	Kent won by 5 wickets
Scorecard	271 (84.5 overs); Dean Elgar 63 (149); Harry Podmore 3/42 (19 overs)		369 (107.3 overs); Joe Denly 88 (200); Sam Curran 3/56 (25 overs)	The Oval, London; Umpires: Billy Taylor and Steve O'Shaughnessy
Scorecard	218 (77.1 overs); Dean Elgar 65 (132); Darren Stevens 5/60 (22 overs)		124/5 (30.4 overs); Ollie Robinson 51* (41); Morne Morkel 2/22 (8 overs)	The Oval, London; Umpires: Billy Taylor and Steve O'Shaughnessy
Toss uncontested, Kent elected to field first.; Gareth Batty (Surrey) was unable to bat and bowl in the first innings due to falling ill.; Points: Kent 23, Surrey 5.

13–15 July 2019	Surrey	v	Nottinghamshire (H)	Surrey won by 167 runs
Scorecard	240 (89.2 overs); Dean Elgar 59 (98); Ravichandran Ashwin 6/69 (33.2 overs)		116 (52.5 overs); Ravichandran Ashwin 27 (75); Amar Virdi 8/61 (25.5 overs)	Trent Bridge, Nottingham; Umpires: Tim Robinson and David Millns
Scorecard	224/9d (79.2 overs); Jamie Smith 57 (106); Ravichandran Ashwin 6/75 (31 overs)		181 (48.3 overs); Ravichandran Ashwin 66* (79); Amar Virdi 6/78 (21 overs)	Trent Bridge, Nottingham; Umpires: Tim Robinson and David Millns
Surrey won the toss and elected to bat.; Points: Surrey 20, Nottinghamshire 3.

13–16 July 2019	Hampshire (H)	v	Kent	Match drawn
Scorecard	409/9d (115 overs); Felix Organ 100 (235); Darren Stevens 5/68 (25 overs)		555 (131.1 overs); Joe Denly 154 (229); Fidel Edwards 5/118 (27 overs)	Rose Bowl, Southampton; Umpires: Graham Lloyd and Jeremy Lloyds
Scorecard	298 (115.4 overs); Ian Holland 69 (200); Joe Denly 3/48 (25 overs)		57/3 (8.2 overs); Joe Denly 29* (22); Fidel Edwards 1/7 (1 over)	Rose Bowl, Southampton; Umpires: Graham Lloyd and Jeremy Lloyds
Hampshire won the toss and elected to bat.; Jordan Cox (Kent) made his first-class debut.; Heino Kuhn (Kent) did not bat in the second innings and was replaced in the team by Alex Blake.; Points: Kent 12, Hampshire 11.

13–16 July 2019	Essex (H)	v	Warwickshire	Essex won by 187 runs
Scorecard	245 (93.3 overs); Alastair Cook 84 (195); Will Rhodes 5/17 (14.3 overs)		161 (66.4 overs); Tim Ambrose 38 (93); Peter Siddle 5/33 (17 overs)	County Ground, Chelmsford; Umpires: Steve O'Shaughnessy and Paul Baldwin
Scorecard	316/9d (97.1 overs); Alastair Cook 83 (168); Will Rhodes 4/38 (18.1 overs)		213 (65.1 overs); Michael Burgess 64 (69); Simon Harmer 6/75 (29.1 overs)	County Ground, Chelmsford; Umpires: Steve O'Shaughnessy and Paul Baldwin
Toss uncontested, Warwickshire elected to field first.; Dan Mousley (Warwickshire) made his first-class debut.; Points: Essex 20, Warwickshire 3.

13–16 July 2019	Yorkshire (H)	v	Somerset	Yorkshire won by an innings and 73 runs
Scorecard	520 (160.1 overs); Gary Ballance 111 (212); Dom Bess 4/130 (42 overs)		196 (67.3 overs); Jamie Overton 52* (69); Keshav Maharaj 7/52 (26.3 overs)	Headingley, Leeds; Umpires: Peter Hartley and Mike Burns
Scorecard			251 (82.5 overs) (f/o); Tom Banton 63 (103); Steven Patterson 4/54 (20.5 overs)	Headingley, Leeds; Umpires: Peter Hartley and Mike Burns
Toss uncontested, Somerset elected to field first.; Points: Yorkshire 22, Somerset 1.

==== August ====
18–20 August 2019	Kent (H)	v	Essex	Essex won by 3 wickets
Scorecard	226 (80.4 overs); Daniel Bell-Drummond 55 (126); Sam Cook 5/42 (18.4 overs)		114 (47.3 overs); Mohammad Amir 28 (39); Harry Podmore 4/34 (18 overs)	St Lawrence Ground, Canterbury; Umpires: Ian Blackwell and Paul Baldwin
Scorecard	40 (18.1 overs); Harry Podmore 9 (21); Sam Cook 7/23 (9 overs)		153/7 (42.1 overs); Simon Harmer 30 (59); Mitchell Claydon 3/21 (7 overs)	St Lawrence Ground, Canterbury; Umpires: Ian Blackwell and Paul Baldwin
Toss uncontested, Essex elected to field first.; Points: Essex 19, Kent 4.

18–21 August 2019	Yorkshire (H)	v	Nottinghamshire	Yorkshire won by 143 runs
Scorecard	232 (76.1 overs); Jonny Tattersall 92 (197); Luke Wood 5/67 (17 overs)		184 (61 overs); Tom Moores 48 (49); Duanne Olivier 4/60 (17 overs)	North Marine Road Ground, Scarborough; Umpires: Martin Saggers and David Millns
Scorecard	338 (101.3 overs); Adam Lyth 81 (143); Luke Fletcher 5/67 (27 overs)		243 (79 overs); Ben Duckett 75 (110); Keshav Maharaj 6/95 (30 overs)	North Marine Road Ground, Scarborough; Umpires: Martin Saggers and David Millns
Toss uncontested, Nottinghamshire elected to field first.; Points: Yorkshire 20, Nottinghamshire 3.

18–21 August 2019	Hampshire	v	Surrey (H)	Match drawn
Scorecard	367 (107 overs); Kyle Abbott 72 (101); Rikki Clarke 7/74 (28 overs)		579/7d (156 overs); Ollie Pope 221* (337); Fidel Edwards 5/125 (22 overs)	The Oval, London; Umpires: Neil Mallender and Rob Bailey
Scorecard	253/5 (64 overs); Felix Organ 77 (89); Amar Virdi 3/54 (25 overs)			The Oval, London; Umpires: Neil Mallender and Rob Bailey
Hampshire won the toss and elected to bat.; Harry Came (Hampshire) made his first-class debut.; Conor McKerr replaced Sam Curran for Surrey when the latter was called up to the national squad on day three.; Harry Came replaced Aneurin Donald for Hampshire when the latter was concussed on day three.; Will Jacks replaced Ollie Pope for Surrey when the latter was called up to the national squad on the fourth day.; Points: Surrey 12, Hampshire 10.

18–21 August 2019	Warwickshire (H)	v	Somerset	Somerset won by 5 wickets
Scorecard	419 (127 overs); Rob Yates 141 (289); Craig Overton 3/98 (31 overs)		308 (92 overs); Steven Davies 109 (189); Will Rhodes 3/37 (13 overs)	Edgbaston, Birmingham; Umpires: Ian Gould and Russell Warren
Scorecard	146 (50.4 overs); Rob Yates 53 (86); Tom Abell 4/39 (13.4 overs)		258/5 (72.4 overs); Tom Banton 66 (119); Oliver Hannon-Dalby 2/59 (18 overs)	Edgbaston, Birmingham; Umpires: Ian Gould and Russell Warren
Warwickshire won the toss and elected to bat.; George Garrett (Warwickshire) made his first-class debut.; Points: Somerset 21, Warwickshire 7.

==== September ====
10–12 September 2019	Somerset (H)	v	Yorkshire	Somerset won by 298 runs
Scorecard	199 (72.5 overs); Tom Abell 66 (193); Keshav Maharaj 5/54 (23.5 overs)		103 (33.3 overs); Gary Ballance 35 (51); Roelof van der Merwe 3/14 (8.3 overs)	County Ground, Taunton; Umpires: Michael Gough and Martin Saggers
Scorecard	329 (83.2 overs); Tom Abell 62 (135); Keshav Maharaj 5/122 (36 overs)		127 (45.2 overs); Steven Patterson 24* (33); Josh Davey 5/21 (11.2 overs)	County Ground, Taunton; Umpires: Michael Gough and Martin Saggers
Toss uncontested, Yorkshire elected to field first.; Ben Coad (Yorkshire) was unable to bat in both innings due to injury.; Points: Somerset 19, Yorkshire 3.

10–12 September 2019	Kent	v	Nottinghamshire (H)	Kent won by 227 runs
Scorecard	304 (81.4 overs); Darren Stevens 88 (90); Ravichandran Ashwin 4/121 (32 overs)		124 (53.1 overs); Steven Mullaney 22 (52); Darren Stevens 5/39 (17.1 overs)	Trent Bridge, Nottingham; Umpires: Graham Lloyd and Peter Hartley
Scorecard	259 (56.5 overs); Sam Billings 100 (106); Ravichandran Ashwin 5/89 (18.5 overs)		212 (51.2 overs); Ravichandran Ashwin 55 (91); Darren Stevens 5/53 (18.2 overs)	Trent Bridge, Nottingham; Umpires: Graham Lloyd and Peter Hartley
Kent won the toss and elected to bat.; Marcus O'Riordan (Kent) made his first-class debut.; Points: Kent 22, Nottinghamshire 3.

10–12 September 2019	Hampshire (H)	v	Surrey	Hampshire won by 272 runs
Scorecard	149 (46.2 overs); Kyle Abbott 27 (25); Rikki Clarke 5/21 (11 overs)		162 (52 overs); Ollie Pope 68 (104); Keith Barker 4/38 (16 overs)	Rose Bowl, Southampton; Umpires: Ian Gould and Mike Burns
Scorecard	436 (92.4 overs); James Vince 91 (54); Morne Morkel 3/75 (20.4 overs)		151 (49.2 overs); Ollie Pope 40 (54); Felix Organ 5/25 (8 overs)	Rose Bowl, Southampton; Umpires: Ian Gould and Mike Burns
Hampshire won the toss and elected to bat.; Points: Hampshire 19, Surrey 3.

10–13 September 2019	Warwickshire	v	Essex (H)	Match drawn
Scorecard	517 (175.5 overs); Matthew Lamb 173 (371); Simon Harmer 6/143 (59.5 overs)		324 (118.3 overs); Tom Westley 141 (266); Jeetan Patel 6/73 (45.3 overs)	Edgbaston, Birmingham; Umpires: David Millns and Nick Cook
Scorecard			158/2 (55 overs) (f/o); Tom Westley 97 (161); Matthew Lamb 1/15 (4 overs)	Edgbaston, Birmingham; Umpires: David Millns and Nick Cook
Toss uncontested, Essex elected to field first.; Ethan Brookes (Warwickshire) made his first-class debut.; Points: Warwickshire 10, Essex 9.

16–18 September 2019	Hampshire (H)	v	Somerset	Hampshire won by 136 runs
Scorecard	196 (58.4 overs); Liam Dawson 103 (156); Lewis Gregory 3/63 (15 overs)		142 (48.4 overs); Dom Bess 37 (98); Kyle Abbott 9/40 (18.4 overs)	Rose Bowl, Southampton; Umpires: Graham Lloyd and Neil Mallender
Scorecard	226 (61.3 overs); James Vince 142 (181); Josh Davey 3/22 (11.3 overs)		144 (48.4 overs); Lewis Gregory 34* (44); Kyle Abbott 8/46 (17.4 overs)	Rose Bowl, Southampton; Umpires: Graham Lloyd and Neil Mallender
Hampshire won the toss and elected to bat.; Points: Hampshire 19, Somerset 3.

16–18 September 2019	Surrey	v	Essex (H)	Essex won by an innings and 40 runs
Scorecard	174 (61.3 overs); Ben Foakes 34 (57); Sam Cook 5/53 (18.3 overs)		395 (109.1 overs); Daniel Lawrence 147 (245); Jordan Clark 3/52 (15 overs)	County Ground, Chelmsford; Umpires: Ian Gould and Martin Saggers
Scorecard	181 (77.2 overs); Jordan Clark 33 (80); Simon Harmer 7/58 (34.2 overs)			County Ground, Chelmsford; Umpires: Ian Gould and Martin Saggers
Surrey won the toss and elected to bat.; Points: Essex 23, Surrey 3.

16–19 September 2019	Nottinghamshire (H)	v	Warwickshire	Warwickshire won by 8 wickets
Scorecard	498 (115.4 overs); Steven Mullaney 179 (173); Henry Brookes 3/131 (27 overs)		488 (135 overs); Dom Sibley 215* (420); Steven Mullaney 4/48 (16 overs)	Trent Bridge, Nottingham; Umpires: Richard Kettleborough and Rob Bailey
Scorecard	260 (71 overs); Joe Clarke 112 (169); Oliver Hannon-Dalby 4/54 (22 overs)		271/2 (55.4 overs); Dom Sibley 109 (147); Paul Coughlin 2/85 (17 overs)	Trent Bridge, Nottingham; Umpires: Richard Kettleborough and Rob Bailey
Toss uncontested, Warwickshire elected to field first.; Ben Compton, Joey Evison and Jack Blatherwick (all Nottinghamshire) made their first-class debuts.; Points: Warwickshire 23, Nottinghamshire 6.

16–19 September 2019	Kent	v	Yorkshire (H)	Kent won by 433 runs
Scorecard	482/8d (96 overs); Darren Stevens 237 (225); Duanne Olivier 5/108 (24 overs)		269 (92 overs); Matthew Fisher 47* (150); Matt Milnes 5/87 (21 overs)	Headingley, Leeds; Umpires: Michael Gough and David Millns
Scorecard	337/7d (74 overs); Sam Billings 122* (156); Matthew Fisher 2/38 (12 overs)		117 (55.2 overs); Jonny Tattersall 41 (95); Darren Stevens 5/20 (18 overs)	Headingley, Leeds; Umpires: Michael Gough and David Millns
Kent won the toss and elected to bat.; Matt Revis (Yorkshire) made his first-class debut.; Points: Kent 24, Yorkshire 4.

23–26 September 2019	Kent (H)	v	Hampshire	Match drawn
Scorecard	147 (43.5 overs); Ollie Rayner 39 (40); Keith Barker 5/48 (17 overs)		80/3 (21 overs); Tom Alsop 40 (49); Darren Stevens 2/27 (10 overs)	St Lawrence Ground, Canterbury; Umpires: Ben Debenham and Ian Gould
Toss uncontested, Hampshire elected to field first.; No play was possible on Day 2 and 3 due to rain.; Points: Hampshire 8, Kent 6.

23–26 September 2019	Surrey (H)	v	Nottinghamshire	Match drawn
Scorecard	402/6d (107.3 overs); Scott Borthwick 137 (309); Steven Mullaney 2/73 (21 overs)		77/1 (20 overs); Ben Slater 29* (50); Rikki Clarke 1/11 (5 overs)	The Oval, London; Umpires: Martin Saggers and Chris Watts
Surrey won the toss and elected to bat.; Points: Surrey 10, Nottinghamshire 7.

23–26 September 2019	Yorkshire	v	Warwickshire (H)	Match drawn
Scorecard	261/2 (64 overs); Tom Kohler-Cadmore 165* (175); Alex Thomson 1/21 (4 overs)			Edgbaston, Birmingham; Umpires: Graham Lloyd and Russell Warren
Yorkshire won the toss and elected to bat.; No play was possible on Day 2 and 3 due to rain.; Tom Loten (Yorkshire) made his first-class debut.; Points: Yorkshire 7, Warwickshire 5.

23–26 September 2019	Somerset (H)	v	Essex	Match drawn
Scorecard	203 (61.4 overs); Roelof van der Merwe 60 (51); Simon Harmer 5/105 (27 overs)		141 (68.2 overs); Alastair Cook 53 (148); Jack Leach 5/32 (25 overs)	County Ground, Taunton; Umpires: Alex Wharf and Rob Bailey
Scorecard	forfeit		45/1 (18 overs); Alastair Cook 30* (48); Dom Bess 1/8 (7 overs)	County Ground, Taunton; Umpires: Alex Wharf and Rob Bailey
Somerset won the toss and elected to bat.; No play was possible on Day 3 due to rain.; Points: Somerset 9, Essex 8.

=== Division Two ===
==== April ====
5–8 April 2019	Derbyshire (H)	v	Durham	Derbyshire won by 125 runs
Scorecard	197 (72.1 overs); Harvey Hosein 78 (172); Ben Raine 3/48 (17 overs)		171 (67.1 overs); Alex Lees 32 (104); Luis Reece 5/47 (17.1 overs)	County Ground, Derby; Umpires: Billy Taylor and Tim Robinson
Scorecard	334 (111.2 overs); Harvey Hosein 62 (121); Matt Salisbury 3/65 (17.2 overs)		235 (92 overs); Gareth Harte 69 (215); Matthew Critchley 3/54 (19 overs)	County Ground, Derby; Umpires: Billy Taylor and Tim Robinson
Derbyshire won the toss and elected to bat.; Points: Derbyshire 19, Durham 3.

5–8 April 2019	Northamptonshire (H)	v	Middlesex	Match drawn
Scorecard	445 (132 overs); Luke Procter 81 (139); Tim Murtagh 6/80 (32 overs)		271 (80.4 overs); James Harris 61 (105); Nathan Buck 5/54 (16.4 overs)	County Ground, Northampton; Umpires: Paul Pollard and Peter Hartley
Scorecard	10/0 (6.5 overs); Rob Newton 5* (14)		317/4d (102.3 overs) (f/o); Dawid Malan 160* (281); Nathan Buck 3/53 (19 overs)	County Ground, Northampton; Umpires: Paul Pollard and Peter Hartley
Toss uncontested, Middlesex elected to field.; Points: Northamptonshire 12, Middlesex 9.

5–8 April 2019	Sussex (H)	v	Leicestershire	Leicestershire won by 7 wickets
Scorecard	173 (44.2 overs); David Wiese 51 (66); Tom Taylor 6/47 (16 overs)		252 (79 overs); Lewis Hill 67 (116); Ollie Robinson 4/46 (19 overs)	County Ground, Hove; Umpires: Jeff Evans and Paul Baldwin
Scorecard	308 (84.1 overs); Phil Salt 80 (67); Colin Ackermann 5/69 (24 overs)		232/3 (73 overs); Paul Horton 61 (112); Ollie Robinson 2/28 (17 overs)	County Ground, Hove; Umpires: Jeff Evans and Paul Baldwin
Toss uncontested, Leicestershire elected to field.; Points: Leicestershire 21, Sussex 3.

11–14 April 2019	Durham (H)	v	Sussex	Sussex won by 6 wickets
Scorecard	224 (102.4 overs); Liam Trevaskis 54 (107); Ollie Robinson 4/53 (29.4 overs)		202 (68 overs); Luke Wells 98* (188); Chris Rushworth 4/41 (18 overs)	Riverside Ground, Chester-le-Street; Umpires: Graham Lloyd and Russell Warren
Scorecard	189 (66 overs); Gareth Harte 74* (138); David Wiese 5/43 (16 overs)		212/4 (66.4 overs); Stiaan van Zyl 101* (149); Matt Salisbury 2/62 (14.4 overs)	Riverside Ground, Chester-le-Street; Umpires: Graham Lloyd and Russell Warren
Toss uncontested, Sussex elected to field.; Points: Sussex 20, Durham 4.

11–14 April 2019	Glamorgan (H)	v	Northamptonshire	Match drawn
Scorecard	570/8d (125 overs); Billy Root 126 (175); Jason Holder 2/79 (21 overs)		750 (227.3 overs); Ricardo Vasconcelos 184 (317); Marnus Labuschagne 3/122 (44 overs)	Sophia Gardens, Cardiff; Umpires: Neil Bainton and Ian Blackwell
Scorecard	70/1 (18 overs); Marnus Labuschagne 27* (28); Josh Cobb 1/21 (8 overs)			Sophia Gardens, Cardiff; Umpires: Neil Bainton and Ian Blackwell
Glamorgan won the toss and elected to bat.; Points: Glamorgan 11, Northamptonshire 11.

11–14 April 2019	Derbyshire	v	Gloucestershire (H)	Match drawn
Scorecard	291 (109.2 overs); Tom Lace 83 (127); Ryan Higgins 3/52 (29 overs)		350 (129.2 overs); Gareth Roderick 98 (238); Luis Reece 3/60 (23 overs)	County Ground, Bristol; Umpires: Ben Debenham and David Millns
Scorecard	388/3d (123 overs); Wayne Madsen 204* (351); Benny Howell 1/48 (18 overs)			County Ground, Bristol; Umpires: Ben Debenham and David Millns
Gloucestershire won the toss and elected to field.; Harry Hankins (Gloucestershire) made his first-class debut.; Points: Gloucestershire 11, Derbyshire 9.

11–14 April 2019	Worcestershire	v	Leicestershire (H)	Worcestershire won by an innings and 18 runs
Scorecard	553/6d (138.5 overs); Hamish Rutherford 123 (230); Ben Mike 2/119 (23.5 overs)		302 (91.3 overs); Ateeq Javid 69 (217); Josh Tongue 4/46 (23 overs)	Grace Road, Leicester; Umpires: Paul Pollard and Jeremy Lloyds
Scorecard			233 (87.3 overs) (f/o); Colin Ackermann 69 (164); Charlie Morris 7/45 (19.3 overs)	Grace Road, Leicester; Umpires: Paul Pollard and Jeremy Lloyds
Leicestershire won the toss and elected to field.; Points: Worcestershire 24, Leicestershire 4.

11–14 April 2019	Middlesex (H)	v	Lancashire	Lancashire won by 7 wickets
Scorecard	265 (100 overs); Stephen Eskinazi 75 (158); Tom Bailey 5/67 (24 overs)		427 (138 overs); Rob Jones 122 (235); Tim Murtagh 5/69 (35 overs)	Lord's, London; Umpires: Billy Taylor and Mike Burns
Scorecard	200 (81.5 overs); Sam Robson 63 (136); Glenn Maxwell 5/40 (16.5 overs)		39/3 (15 overs); Haseeb Hameed 13* (19); Sam Robson 2/4 (2 overs)	Lord's, London; Umpires: Billy Taylor and Mike Burns
Toss uncontested, Lancashire elected to field.; Points: Lancashire 22, Middlesex 3.

==== May ====
14–17 May 2019	Gloucestershire	v	Glamorgan (H)	Match drawn
Scorecard	463 (118.1 overs); James Bracey 152 (242); Marchant de Lange 4/116 (25 overs)		250 (75.1 overs); Charlie Hemphrey 60 (88); George Drissell 4/83 (22.1 overs)	Spytty Park, Newport; Umpires: Graham Lloyd and Russell Warren
Scorecard	137/6 (50 overs); Benny Howell 44 (69); Kieran Bull 2/42 (20 overs)		481/8d (132 overs) (f/o); Nick Selman 150 (270); David Payne 4/121 (36 overs)	Spytty Park, Newport; Umpires: Graham Lloyd and Russell Warren
Gloucestershire won the toss and elected to bat.; Chris Cooke (Glamorgan) was unable to bat in either innings due to an injury.; Points: Gloucestershire 13, Glamorgan 9.

14–17 May 2019	Northamptonshire	v	Lancashire (H)	Lancashire won by 10 wickets
Scorecard	230 (78.2 overs); Luke Wood 66 (112); Richard Gleeson 5/63 (19 overs)		415 (149.4 overs); Dane Vilas 97 (147); Luke Wood 5/72 (27 overs)	Old Trafford, Manchester; Umpires: Tim Robinson and Paul Baldwin
Scorecard	200 (61.4 overs); Rob Keogh 42 (88); Richard Gleeson 5/50 (14 overs)		17/0 (2.4 overs); Haseeb Hameed 13* (10)	Old Trafford, Manchester; Umpires: Tim Robinson and Paul Baldwin
Lancashire won the toss and elected to field.; Points: Lancashire 21, Northamptonshire 3.

14–17 May 2019	Middlesex (H)	v	Leicestershire	Match drawn
Scorecard	349 (103.3 overs); Nick Gubbins 75 (120); Mohammad Abbas 4/72 (30 overs)		268 (89.3 overs); Colin Ackermann 63 (132); Ollie Rayner 4/58 (22 overs)	Lord's, London; Umpires: Martin Saggers and Ian Blackwell
Scorecard	223 (74.4 overs); John Simpson 59* (132); Chris Wright 3/51 (18 overs)		226/5 (74 overs); Colin Ackermann 70* (88); James Harris 2/75 (20 overs)	Lord's, London; Umpires: Martin Saggers and Ian Blackwell
Toss uncontested, Leicestershire elected to field.; Points: Middlesex 11, Leicestershire 10.

14–17 May 2019	Durham	v	Worcestershire (H)	Worcestershire won by 5 wickets
Scorecard	273 (92 overs); Jack Burnham 76 (140); Charlie Morris 6/53 (19 overs)		390 (123.3 overs); Riki Wessels 118 (133); Matt Salisbury 4/67 (25 overs)	New Road, Worcester; Umpires: James Middlebrook and Jeff Evans
Scorecard	197 (65.5 overs); Liam Trevaskis 47 (94); Josh Tongue 5/37 (13 overs)		84/5 (19.4 overs); Tom Fell 36 (37); Chris Rushworth 5/28 (9 overs)	New Road, Worcester; Umpires: James Middlebrook and Jeff Evans
Durham won the toss and elected to bat.; Joshua Dell (Worcestershire) made his first-class debut.; Points: Worcestershire 23, Durham 4.

19–22 May 2019	Derbyshire (H)	v	Glamorgan	Glamorgan won by 2 wickets
Scorecard	378 (104.1 overs); Luis Reece 111 (173); Lukas Carey 4/61 (21 overs)		346 (112.3 overs); Charlie Hemphrey 75 (189); Ravi Rampaul 5/94 (24.3 overs)	County Ground, Derby; Umpires: Billy Taylor and Martin Saggers
Scorecard	213 (63.5 overs); Wayne Madsen 47 (55); Daniel Douthwaite 4/48 (15 overs)		248/8 (78.5 overs); Tom Cullen 51* (88); Ravi Rampaul 3/55 (15 overs)	County Ground, Derby; Umpires: Billy Taylor and Martin Saggers
Derbyshire won the toss and elected to bat.; Play on day 1 was reduced to 69 overs due to rain and bad light.; Points: Glamorgan 22, Derbyshire 7.

20–22 May 2019	Durham (H)	v	Gloucestershire	Gloucestershire won by 6 wickets
Scorecard	158 (56.4 overs); Jack Burnham 43 (105); David Payne 4/40 (19.4 overs)		174 (56.5 overs); James Bracey 35 (74); Matt Salisbury 3/30 (12 overs)	Riverside Ground, Chester-le-Street; Umpires: Nick Cook and Paul Baldwin
Scorecard	132 (50.4 overs); Cameron Bancroft 40 (100); Josh Shaw 3/31 (14 overs)		119/4 (40.3 overs); Miles Hammond 36 (107); Matt Salisbury 3/41 (11 overs)	Riverside Ground, Chester-le-Street; Umpires: Nick Cook and Paul Baldwin
Toss uncontested, Gloucestershire elected to field.; Points: Gloucestershire 19, Durham 3.

20–22 May 2019	Worcestershire	v	Lancashire (H)	Lancashire won by 6 wickets
Scorecard	172 (58.5 overs); Wayne Parnell 63 (132); James Anderson 5/25 (17 overs)		201 (65.2 overs); Liam Livingstone 69 (112); Wayne Parnell 5/47 (22 overs)	Old Trafford, Manchester; Umpires: Peter Hartley and Ben Debenham
Scorecard	154 (70.2 overs); Tom Fell 40 (97); Richard Gleeson 5/37 (17.2 overs)		127/4 (42.2 overs); Dane Vilas 60* (89); Joe Leach 2/29 (12 overs)	Old Trafford, Manchester; Umpires: Peter Hartley and Ben Debenham
Lancashire won the toss and elected to field.; Points: Lancashire 20, Worcestershire 3.

20–23 May 2019	Sussex	v	Northamptonshire (H)	Match drawn
Scorecard	422 (118.2 overs); Chris Jordan 166 (257); Ben Sanderson 3/78 (28 overs)		368 (101.3 overs); Ricardo Vasconcelos 83 (133); Luke Wells 2/18 (9 overs)	County Ground, Northampton; Umpires: Steve O'Shaughnessy and Russell Warren
Scorecard	339/4d (69 overs); Phil Salt 122 (104); Jamie Overton 2/58 (11 overs)		288/6 (89.3 overs); Adam Rossington 69* (168); Mir Hamza 4/51 (19 overs)	County Ground, Northampton; Umpires: Steve O'Shaughnessy and Russell Warren
Northamptonshire won the toss and elected to field.; Due to being under concussion protocol, Alex Wakely (Northamptonshire) was replaced in the team by Josh Cobb.; Luke Wood (Northamptonshire) was unable to bat in either innings due to injury and was replaced in the team by Brett Hutton.; Points: Sussex 13, Northamptonshire 11.

27–30 May 2019	Gloucestershire (H)	v	Lancashire	Match drawn
Scorecard	205 (69.1 overs); Miles Hammond 82 (204); Saqib Mahmood 4/48 (14 overs)		244 (72.5 overs); Rob Jones 53 (78); Matthew Taylor 5/57 (15 overs)	College Ground, Cheltenham; Umpires: Paul Pollard and Jeff Evans
Scorecard	68/2 (21 overs); Chris Dent 30* (63); Tom Bailey 1/10 (6 overs)			College Ground, Cheltenham; Umpires: Paul Pollard and Jeff Evans
Toss uncontested, Lancashire elected to field.; Points: Lancashire 9, Gloucestershire 9.

27–30 May 2019	Derbyshire	v	Leicestershire (H)	Derbyshire won by 65 runs
Scorecard	139 (50.4 overs); Wayne Madsen 47 (69); Mohammad Abbas 3/38 (17 overs)		120 (56.3 overs); Hassan Azad 46* (107); Tony Palladino 5/29 (18.3 overs)	Grace Road, Leicester; Umpires: Graham Lloyd and Mark Newell
Scorecard	214 (72.5 overs); Wayne Madsen 51 (63); Mohammad Abbas 3/58 (22 overs)		168 (59 overs); Hassan Azad 44 (119); Ravi Rampaul 3/38 (14 overs)	Grace Road, Leicester; Umpires: Graham Lloyd and Mark Newell
Derbyshire won the toss and elected to bat.; Points: Derbyshire 19, Leicestershire 3.

27–30 May 2019	Glamorgan	v	Sussex (H)	Match drawn
Scorecard	186 (55.2 overs); Nick Selman 76* (156); Chris Jordan 3/31 (12 overs)		420 (93.4 overs); Ben Brown 131 (190); Marnus Labuschagne 3/61 (16 overs)	County Ground, Hove; Umpires: David Millns and Paul Baldwin
Scorecard	466 (125.1 overs); Marnus Labuschagne 182 (244); Luke Wells 5/63 (23.1 overs)		47/1 (15 overs); Harry Finch 22* (47); Marchant de Lange 1/25 (7 overs)	County Ground, Hove; Umpires: David Millns and Paul Baldwin
Glamorgan won the toss and elected to bat.; Jared Warner (Sussex) made his first-class debut.; Points: Sussex 13, Glamorgan 9.

27–30 May 2019	Middlesex	v	Worcestershire (H)	Middlesex won by 127 runs
Scorecard	221 (66.2 overs); Dawid Malan 45 (91); Josh Tongue 3/49 (17 overs)		156 (63.5 overs); Callum Ferguson 37 (53); Tom Helm 5/36 (19 overs)	New Road, Worcester; Umpires: Billy Taylor and Neil Mallender
Scorecard	287/6d (72 overs); Dawid Malan 124 (173); Joe Leach 2/48 (16 overs)		225 (73.3 overs); Ross Whiteley 60 (112); Tim Murtagh 6/51 (18 overs)	New Road, Worcester; Umpires: Billy Taylor and Neil Mallender
Worcestershire won the toss and elected to field.; Points: Middlesex 20, Worcestershire 3.

==== June ====
2–5 June 2019	Middlesex (H)	v	Sussex	Sussex won by an innings and 50 runs
Scorecard	138 (43.4 overs); James Harris 38* (63); David Wiese 5/26 (15 overs)		481/9d (136.4 overs); Stiaan van Zyl 173 (354); James Harris 4/98 (24.4 overs)	Lord's, London; Umpires: James Middlebrook and Jeremy Lloyds
Scorecard	293 (107.2 overs); James Harris 80 (211); Ollie Robinson 7/98 (35 overs)			Lord's, London; Umpires: James Middlebrook and Jeremy Lloyds
Middlesex won the toss and elected to bat.; Points: Sussex 24, Middlesex 2.

2–5 June 2019	Northamptonshire (H)	v	Glamorgan	Glamorgan won by an innings and 143 runs
Scorecard	209 (59 overs); Adam Rossington 77 (114); Marchant de Lange 4/64 (14 overs)		547 (112.3 overs); Billy Root 229 (252); Ben Sanderson 4/27 (29 overs)	County Ground, Northampton; Umpires: Tom Lungley and Nick Cook
Scorecard	195 (63.5 overs); Ben Curran 52 (66); Michael Hogan 4/32 (16 overs)			County Ground, Northampton; Umpires: Tom Lungley and Nick Cook
Toss uncontested, Glamorgan elected to field.; Ben Sanderson (Northamptonshire) was unable to bat in the second innings due to an injury.; Points: Glamorgan 24, Northamptonshire 4.

3–6 June 2019	Durham (H)	v	Derbyshire	Durham won by 29 runs
Scorecard	293 (106.5 overs); Jack Burnham 67 (146); Ravi Rampaul 5/77 (29.5 overs)		268 (87.5 overs); Matthew Critchley 79* (135); Gareth Harte 4/15 (10 overs)	Riverside Ground, Chester-le-Street; Umpires: Paul Pollard and Rob Bailey
Scorecard	242 (84.5 overs); Alex Lees 107* (243); Ravi Rampaul 3/53 (21 overs)		238 (71.2 overs); Matthew Critchley 71 (97); Ben Raine 4/44 (18.2 overs)	Riverside Ground, Chester-le-Street; Umpires: Paul Pollard and Rob Bailey
Toss uncontested, Derbyshire elected to field.; Points: Durham 21, Derbyshire 5.

3–6 June 2019	Lancashire (H)	v	Leicestershire	Match drawn
Scorecard	449 (119.3 overs); Liam Livingstone 114 (171); Dieter Klein 3/89 (26.3 overs)		288 (98 overs); Dieter Klein 87 (112); Richard Gleeson 4/58 (22 overs)	Aigburth Cricket Ground, Liverpool; Umpires: Neil Bainton and Russell Warren
Scorecard			151/5 (98 overs) (f/o); Paul Horton 49 (151); Graham Onions 2/28 (21 overs)	Aigburth Cricket Ground, Liverpool; Umpires: Neil Bainton and Russell Warren
Toss uncontested, Leicestershire elected to field.; Harry Swindells (Leicestershire) made his first-class debut.; Points: Lancashire 13, Leicestershire 9.

10–13 June 2019	Durham (H)	v	Northamptonshire	Match drawn
Scorecard	253 (107.3 overs); Ben Raine 82 (185); Ben Sanderson 4/55 (28 overs)		254/6 (71 overs); Ricardo Vasconcelos 105* (200); Chris Rushworth 3/45 (21 overs)	Riverside Ground, Chester-le-Street; Umpires: Peter Hartley and Jeff Evans
Toss uncontested, Northamptonshire elected to field.; Points: Northamptonshire 10, Durham 9.

10–13 June 2019	Leicestershire (H)	v	Middlesex	Match drawn
Scorecard	36/3 (11 overs); Hassan Azad 17* (27); Tom Helm 1/9 (5 overs)			Grace Road, Leicester; Umpires: Ulhas Gandhe and Steve O'Shaughnessy
Toss uncontested, Middlesex elected to field.; Points: Middlesex 6, Leicestershire 5.

10–13 June 2019	Worcestershire (H)	v	Lancashire	Match drawn
Scorecard	98 (38.1 overs); Ed Barnard 32 (77); James Anderson 4/24 (14.1 overs)		110/3 (33.2 overs); Liam Livingstone 53* (69); Wayne Parnell 2/18 (7 overs)	New Road, Worcester; Umpires: Mark Newell and Rob Bailey
Toss uncontested, Lancashire elected to field.; Adam Finch (Worcestershire) made his first-class debut.; Points: Lancashire 8, Worcestershire 6.

11–14 June 2019	Glamorgan (H)	v	Derbyshire	Match drawn
Scorecard	394 (95.3 overs); Graham Wagg 100 (102); Luis Reece 3/40 (14 overs)		598/5d (131 overs); Billy Godleman 227 (327); Lukas Carey 2/99 (27 overs)	St Helen's, Swansea; Umpires: Mike Burns and Russell Warren
Scorecard	184/2 (40 overs); Marnus Labuschagne 83 (90); Alex Hughes 1/13 (8 overs)			St Helen's, Swansea; Umpires: Mike Burns and Russell Warren
Toss uncontested, Derbyshire elected to field.; Points: Derbyshire 13, Glamorgan 10.

11–14 June 2019	Sussex (H)	v	Gloucestershire	Match drawn
Scorecard	351/8d (126 overs); Will Beer 97 (336); Graeme van Buuren 3/46 (25 overs)		444/6d (127.3 overs); Gareth Roderick 158 (246); Ollie Robinson 3/88 (29 overs)	Arundel Castle Cricket Ground, Arundel; Umpires: Neil Bainton and Ian Blackwell
Toss uncontested, Gloucestershire elected to field.; Points: Sussex 10, Gloucestershire 10.

16–19 June 2019	Middlesex (H)	v	Glamorgan	Match drawn
Scorecard	410 (117.4 overs); Paul Stirling 138 (215); Marnus Labuschagne 3/52 (11 overs)		288 (86 overs); David Lloyd 59 (122); Steven Finn 5/75 (21 overs)	Brunton Memorial Ground, Radlett; Umpires: Graham Lloyd and Neil Bainton
Scorecard	125/4 (33 overs); Nick Gubbins 38 (36); Marnus Labuschagne 2/25 (6 overs)			Brunton Memorial Ground, Radlett; Umpires: Graham Lloyd and Neil Bainton
Toss uncontested, Glamorgan elected to field.; Points: Middlesex 12, Glamorgan 9.

17–19 June 2019	Derbyshire (H)	v	Lancashire	Lancashire won by 10 wickets
Scorecard	153 (51.4 overs); Leus du Plooy 38* (64); James Anderson 5/18 (17 overs)		236 (69.4 overs); Steven Croft 53* (77); Luis Reece 6/58 (22 overs)	County Ground, Derby; Umpires: Nick Cook and Ian Blackwell
Scorecard	84 (35 overs); Harvey Hosein 29 (65); Graham Onions 5/38 (13 overs)		4/0 (0.1 overs); Keaton Jennings 4* (1)	County Ground, Derby; Umpires: Nick Cook and Ian Blackwell
Toss uncontested, Lancashire elected to field.; Points: Lancashire 20, Derbyshire 3.

17–20 June 2019	Leicestershire (H)	v	Gloucestershire	Match drawn
Scorecard	487 (139.4 overs); Neil Dexter 180 (284); Josh Shaw 4/85 (24 overs)		571 (137 overs); Ryan Higgins 199 (257); Dieter Klein 4/113 (23 overs)	Grace Road, Leicester; Umpires: Paul Pollard and Ben Debenham
Scorecard	211/0d (56.4 overs); Hassan Azad 100* (170)			Grace Road, Leicester; Umpires: Paul Pollard and Ben Debenham
Toss uncontested, Gloucestershire elected to field.; Points: Gloucestershire 12, Leicestershire 11.

18–21 June 2019	Sussex	v	Worcestershire (H)	Match drawn
Scorecard	255 (73.1 overs); Ben Brown 80 (160); Wayne Parnell 4/92 (19 overs)		383 (112.5 overs); Ben Cox 61 (105); Ollie Robinson 5/84 (29.5 overs)	Chester Road North Ground, Kidderminster; Umpires: Tim Robinson and Ulhas Gandhe
Scorecard	424 (121 overs); Laurie Evans 113 (186); Ed Barnard 3/68 (28 overs)		82/2 (24 overs); Daryl Mitchell 34* (73); Will Beer 1/8 (4 overs)	Chester Road North Ground, Kidderminster; Umpires: Tim Robinson and Ulhas Gandhe
Worcestershire won the toss and elected to field.; Aaron Thomason (Sussex) made his first-class debut.; Points: Worcestershire 12, Sussex 10.

23–26 June 2019	Gloucestershire (H)	v	Glamorgan	Glamorgan won by 4 wickets
Scorecard	313 (96.1 overs); Chris Dent 105 (186); Michael Hogan 3/51 (25 overs)		287 (93.1 overs); Nick Selman 73 (132); Josh Shaw 3/61 (19 overs)	County Ground, Bristol; Umpires: Ulhas Gandhe and Rob Bailey
Scorecard	161 (62.2 overs); James Bracey 33 (88); Michael Hogan 4/22 (18 overs)		188/6 (42.1 overs); Marnus Labuschagne 82 (98); Josh Shaw 3/41 (10 overs)	County Ground, Bristol; Umpires: Ulhas Gandhe and Rob Bailey
Toss uncontested, Glamorgan elected to field.; Points: Glamorgan 21, Gloucestershire 6.

24–27 June 2019	Northamptonshire (H)	v	Leicestershire	Match drawn
Scorecard	299 (90.5 overs); Alex Wakely 65 (151); Chris Wright 4/78 (23 overs)		293 (103.2 overs); Hassan Azad 92 (212); Matt Coles 3/51 (21 overs)	County Ground, Northampton; Umpires: Billy Taylor and Neil Mallender
Scorecard	206/6d (58 overs); Temba Bavuma 68 (127); Mohammad Abbas 3/39 (12 overs)			County Ground, Northampton; Umpires: Billy Taylor and Neil Mallender
Toss uncontested, Leicestershire elected to field.; Points: Northamptonshire 10, Leicestershire 10.

24–27 June 2019	Durham	v	Sussex (H)	Durham won by 196 runs
Scorecard	384 (113.1 overs); Cameron Bancroft 158 (305); Chris Jordan 4/58 (26 overs)		232 (70.2 overs); Ben Brown 56 (81); Brydon Carse 5/43 (14.2 overs)	County Ground, Hove; Umpires: Ben Debenham and Alex Wharf
Scorecard	284/3d (68.5 overs); Alex Lees 143 (212); Ollie Robinson 1/17 (5 overs)		240 (96.3 overs); Ollie Robinson 59 (144); Ben Raine 6/27 (22.3 overs)	County Ground, Hove; Umpires: Ben Debenham and Alex Wharf
Durham won the toss and elected to bat.; Points: Durham 23, Sussex 3.

30 June – 2 July 2019	Northamptonshire	v	Sussex (H)	Northamptonshire won by 393 runs
Scorecard	273 (87 overs); Saif Zaib 54 (109); Ollie Robinson 6/63 (24 overs)		106 (44.1 overs); Delray Rawlins 31 (64); Ben Sanderson 6/37 (16.1 overs)	County Ground, Hove; Umpires: Jeremy Lloyds and Paul Baldwin
Scorecard	331 (77.2 overs); Ricardo Vasconcelos 88 (138); Ollie Robinson 4/69 (17 overs)		105 (34.3 overs); Ben Brown 46 (38); Ben Sanderson 4/18 (11.3 overs)	County Ground, Hove; Umpires: Jeremy Lloyds and Paul Baldwin
Northamptonshire won the toss and elected to bat.; Points: Northamptonshire 21, Sussex 3.; This was Northamptonshire's largest victory by runs in club history, and Sussex's largest defeat by runs.

30 June – 3 July 2019	Derbyshire (H)	v	Middlesex	Match drawn
Scorecard	557/6d (144.2 overs); Leus du Plooy 118 (237); George Scott 2/49 (14 overs)		520 (167.3 overs); Dawid Malan 199 (273); Leus du Plooy 2/42 (13 overs)	County Ground, Derby; Umpires: Peter Hartley and Chris Watts
Scorecard	178/6d (47 overs); Leus du Plooy 69* (101); Nathan Sowter 3/89 (18 overs)			County Ground, Derby; Umpires: Peter Hartley and Chris Watts
Toss uncontested, Middlesex elected to field.; Points: Derbyshire 12, Middlesex 9.

30 June – 3 July 2019	Glamorgan (H)	v	Worcestershire	Match drawn
Scorecard	449 (120.5 overs); Marnus Labuschagne 106 (139); Brett D'Oliveira 7/92 (26.5 overs)		370 (128.5 overs); Brett D'Oliveira 103 (158); Michael Hogan 5/62 (29.5 overs)	Sophia Gardens, Cardiff; Umpires: Tom Lungley and Jeff Evans
Scorecard	246/5d (66 overs); Marnus Labuschagne 100 (113); Brett D'Oliveira 2/90 (26 overs)		143/1 (51 overs); Callum Ferguson 70* (151); Lukas Carey 1/29 (14 overs)	Sophia Gardens, Cardiff; Umpires: Tom Lungley and Jeff Evans
Toss uncontested, Worcestershire elected to field.; Points: Glamorgan 13, Worcestershire 10.

30 June – 3 July 2019	Lancashire (H)	v	Durham	Match drawn
Scorecard	337 (116.5 overs); Dane Vilas 72 (119); Nathan Rimmington 4/74 (25.5 overs)		281 (104.5 overs); Cameron Bancroft 77 (139); Graham Onions 5/93 (31.5 overs)	Sedbergh School, Sedbergh; Umpires: Paul Pollard and Steve O'Shaughnessy
Scorecard	247 (78.3 overs); Dane Vilas 85 (135); Nathan Rimmington 4/42 (16.3 overs)		194/6 (75 overs); Cameron Bancroft 92* (191); Saqib Mahmood 3/58 (19 overs)	Sedbergh School, Sedbergh; Umpires: Paul Pollard and Steve O'Shaughnessy
Toss uncontested, Durham elected to field.; James Anderson (Lancashire) was unable to bowl in the second innings due to an injury.; Points: Lancashire 11, Durham 9.

==== July ====
7–9 July 2019	Middlesex (H)	v	Gloucestershire	Middlesex won by 78 runs
Scorecard	172 (74.2 overs); Dawid Malan 28 (68); Josh Shaw 4/33 (15.2 overs)		201 (73.3 overs); Ryan Higgins 61* (97); Toby Roland-Jones 7/52 (21 overs)	Merchant Taylors' School Ground, Northwood; Umpires: James Middlebrook and Mike Burns
Scorecard	244 (85.3 overs); Toby Roland-Jones 51* (111); Ryan Higgins 4/35 (18 overs)		137 (44.3 overs); Graeme van Buuren 57* (71); Tim Murtagh 5/44 (12 overs)	Merchant Taylors' School Ground, Northwood; Umpires: James Middlebrook and Mike Burns
Toss uncontested, Gloucestershire elected to field.; Ethan Bamber (Middlesex) was unable to bat and bowl in the second innings due to an injury and was replaced in the team by Tim Murtagh.; Points: Middlesex 19, Gloucestershire 4.

7–10 July 2019	Durham	v	Leicestershire (H)	Durham won by 119 runs
Scorecard	117 (47.3 overs); Cameron Bancroft 36 (79); Chris Wright 5/30 (13 overs)		212 (84.5 overs); Colin Ackermann 62* (171); Chris Rushworth 5/55 (24.5 overs)	Grace Road, Leicester; Umpires: Ian Blackwell and Paul Baldwin
Scorecard	487/7d (128.2 overs); Cameron Bancroft 109 (158); Mohammad Abbas 2/79 (27 overs)		273 (82.3 overs); Hassan Azad 62 (144); Ben Raine 5/47 (21.3 overs)	Grace Road, Leicester; Umpires: Ian Blackwell and Paul Baldwin
Durham won the toss and elected to bat.; Points: Durham 19, Leicestershire 4.

7–10 July 2019	Northamptonshire (H)	v	Lancashire	Match drawn
Scorecard	442 (129.4 overs); Temba Bavuma 103 (126); Graham Onions 5/77 (25 overs)		315 (94 overs); Alex Davies 147 (223); Ben Sanderson 4/62 (26 overs)	County Ground, Northampton; Umpires: David Millns and Chris Watts
Scorecard	263/9d (66 overs); Rob Keogh 74 (127); Stephen Parry 3/59 (22 overs)		275/4 (82.3 overs); Josh Bohannon 65* (147); Brett Hutton 1/43 (15.3 overs)	County Ground, Northampton; Umpires: David Millns and Chris Watts
Toss uncontested, Lancashire elected to field.; Points: Northamptonshire 12, Lancashire 10.

7–10 July 2019	Derbyshire	v	Worcestershire (H)	Derbyshire won by 82 runs
Scorecard	108 (44.2 overs); Fynn Hudson-Prentice 31 (27); Charlie Morris 4/26 (13 overs)		113 (39.5 overs); Dillon Pennington 18 (31); Luis Reece 4/30 (12 overs)	New Road, Worcester; Umpires: Jeremy Lloyds and Russell Warren
Scorecard	377 (131.4 overs); Tom Lace 132* (331); Ed Barnard 4/48 (26.4 overs)		290 (116.5 overs); Callum Ferguson 127 (288); Ravi Rampaul 4/64 (24 overs)	New Road, Worcester; Umpires: Jeremy Lloyds and Russell Warren
Derbyshire won the toss and elected to bat.; Points: Derbyshire 19, Worcestershire 3.

13–15 July 2019	Sussex	v	Lancashire (H)	Lancashire won by an innings and 51 runs
Scorecard	127 (46.2 overs); Phil Salt 40 (48); Matt Parkinson 6/23 (15.2 overs)		494/6d (136.2 overs); Dane Vilas 132* (154); Will Beer 2/76 (24.2 overs)	Old Trafford, Manchester; Umpires: Tom Lungley and Alex Wharf
Scorecard	316 (69.1 overs); Delray Rawlins 100 (100); Matt Parkinson 4/142 (27.1 overs)			Old Trafford, Manchester; Umpires: Tom Lungley and Alex Wharf
Sussex won the toss and elected to bat.; Points: Lancashire 23, Sussex 1.

13–16 July 2019	Durham (H)	v	Worcestershire	Durham won by 109 runs
Scorecard	212 (75.4 overs); Ben Raine 78* (181); Ed Barnard 4/42 (16.4 overs)		151 (52.2 overs); Riki Wessels 33 (48); Chris Rushworth 4/28 (14 overs)	Riverside Ground, Chester-le-Street; Umpires: James Middlebrook and Ben Debenham
Scorecard	290/8d (96 overs); Jack Burnham 76 (107); Ed Barnard 4/79 (25 overs)		242 (84.4 overs); Ben Cox 62 (110); Chris Rushworth 6/39 (24.4 overs)	Riverside Ground, Chester-le-Street; Umpires: James Middlebrook and Ben Debenham
Toss uncontested, Worcestershire elected to field.; Points: Durham 20, Worcestershire 3.

13–16 July 2019	Middlesex	v	Glamorgan (H)	Middlesex won by 256 runs
Scorecard	384 (84.1 overs); Dawid Malan 166 (194); Lukas Carey 4/54 (16.1 overs)		171 (53.3 overs); David Lloyd 67 (95); Tom Helm 5/53 (16.3 overs)	Sophia Gardens, Cardiff; Umpires: Paul Pollard and Martin Saggers
Scorecard	342 (78.4 overs); Sam Robson 140* (224); Marnus Labuschagne 2/38 (6.4 overs)		299 (90.4 overs); Charlie Hemphrey 72 (254); Toby Roland-Jones 5/68 (22 overs)	Sophia Gardens, Cardiff; Umpires: Paul Pollard and Martin Saggers
Middlesex won the toss and elected to bat.; Points: Middlesex 23, Glamorgan 2.

14–16 July 2019	Northamptonshire	v	Derbyshire (H)	Northamptonshire won by 72 runs
Scorecard	342 (81.1 overs); Temba Bavuma 134 (188); Matt Critchley 4/107 (18 overs)		146 (47.5 overs); Fynn Hudson-Prentice 55* (46); Ben Sanderson 5/46 (19 overs)	Queen's Park, Chesterfield; Umpires: Neil Mallender and Ian Blackwell
Scorecard	122 (30.2 overs); Temba Bavuma 31 (46); Tony Palladino 4/33 (12 overs)		246 (50 overs); Tom Lace 41 (45); Luke Procter 4/26 (9 overs)	Queen's Park, Chesterfield; Umpires: Neil Mallender and Ian Blackwell
Northamptonshire won the toss and elected to bat.; Points: Northamptonshire 22, Derbyshire 3.

15–18 July 2019	Leicestershire	v	Gloucestershire (H)	Gloucestershire won by 6 wickets
Scorecard	252 (95.3 overs); Neil Dexter 56 (178); Matt Taylor 3/39 (18 overs)		504/9d (154.1 overs); Chris Dent 125 (231); Will Davis 3/73 (29 overs)	College Ground, Cheltenham; Umpires: Nick Cook and Russell Warren
Scorecard	299 (119.1 overs); Hassan Azad 121 (302); Ryan Higgins 5/71 (24 overs)		48/4 (7.3 overs); Ryan Higgins 13* (16); Chris Wright 2/26 (3.3 overs)	College Ground, Cheltenham; Umpires: Nick Cook and Russell Warren
Leicestershire won the toss and elected to bat.; Points: Gloucestershire 22, Leicestershire 4.

21–24 July 2019	Gloucestershire (H)	v	Worcestershire	Gloucestershire won by 13 runs
Scorecard	354 (103.2 overs); Tom Smith 83 (220); Joe Leach 6/79 (24.2 overs)		293 (113 overs); Ross Whiteley 88 (184); Ryan Higgins 3/52 (24 overs)	College Ground, Cheltenham; Umpires: Graham Lloyd and Richard Illingworth
Scorecard	184 (76.3 overs); Ryan Higgins 36 (35); Ed Barnard 3/17 (15 overs)		232 (75.1 overs); Callum Ferguson 63 (166); Ryan Higgins 4/64 (21 overs)	College Ground, Cheltenham; Umpires: Graham Lloyd and Richard Illingworth
Toss uncontested, Worcestershire elected to field.; Matt Taylor was replaced in the attack on the second day because of injury.; Points: Gloucestershire 23, Worcestershire 5.

==== August ====
18–20 August 2019	Glamorgan (H)	v	Lancashire	Lancashire won by an innings and 150 runs
Scorecard	257 (60.4 overs); Charlie Hemphrey 56 (132); Tom Bailey 4/50 (14 overs)		545 (127.4 overs); Dane Vilas 266 (240); Michael Hogan 2/64 (24 overs)	Penrhyn Avenue, Rhos-on-Sea; Umpires: Graham Lloyd and James Middlebrook
Scorecard	138 (51.1 overs); Chris Cooke 41 (56); Saqib Mahmood 3/42 (13.1 overs)			Penrhyn Avenue, Rhos-on-Sea; Umpires: Graham Lloyd and James Middlebrook
Glamorgan won the toss and elected to bat.; Points: Lancashire 24, Glamorgan 4.

18–20 August 2019	Worcestershire	v	Northamptonshire (H)	Northamptonshire won by 10 wickets
Scorecard	186 (46.3 overs); Joe Leach 53* (39); Brett Hutton 6/57 (16 overs)		376 (123.1 overs); Dwaine Pretorius 111 (156); Moeen Ali 3/126 (39.1 overs)	County Ground, Northampton; Umpires: Mark Newell and Mike Burns
Scorecard	223 (61.2 overs); Riki Wessels 84* (91); Ben Sanderson 4/33 (13 overs)		36/0 (4.3 overs); Ben Curran 17* (12)	County Ground, Northampton; Umpires: Mark Newell and Mike Burns
Worcestershire won the toss and elected to bat.; Nathan Buck was unable to bat in the first innings due to an injury and was replaced in the team by Blessing Muzarabani.; Points: Northamptonshire 22, Worcestershire 2.

18–20 August 2019	Middlesex	v	Sussex (H)	Sussex won by 7 wickets
Scorecard	75 (21.4 overs); Stephen Eskinazi 24 (38); Ollie Robinson 8/34 (11 overs)		309 (84.3 overs); Will Beer 77 (110); Toby Roland-Jones 5/70 (20 overs)	County Ground, Hove; Umpires: Ben Debenham and Jeff Evans
Scorecard	378 (112.2 overs); John Simpson 89 (140); Ollie Robinson 6/101 (35 overs)		145/3 (37.2 overs); Alex Carey 69* (54); Tim Murtagh 2/19 (11 overs)	County Ground, Hove; Umpires: Ben Debenham and Jeff Evans
Sussex won the toss and elected to field.; Elliot Hooper (Sussex) made his first-class debut.; Points: Sussex 22, Middlesex 3.

18–21 August 2019	Derbyshire (H)	v	Gloucestershire	Gloucestershire won by 8 wickets
Scorecard	200 (74.5 overs); Alex Hughes 39 (138); Ryan Higgins 5/54 (22 overs)		419 (123.4 overs); Chris Dent 169 (331); Luis Reece 4/91 (27.4 overs)	County Ground, Derby; Umpires: Tom Lungley and Jeremy Lloyds
Scorecard	481/6d (130 overs); Tom Lace 125 (225); Ben Allison 3/109 (29 overs)		263/2 (47.1 overs); James Bracey 116* (143); Ravi Rampaul 1/52 (11 overs)	County Ground, Derby; Umpires: Tom Lungley and Jeremy Lloyds
Toss uncontested, Gloucestershire elected to field.; Ben Allison (Gloucestershire) made his first-class debut.; Points: Gloucestershire 23, Derbyshire 3.

18–21 August 2019	Durham (H)	v	Leicestershire	Match drawn
Scorecard	544/9d (139.3 overs); Alex Lees 181 (265); Will Davis 3/100 (28 overs)		236 (84.4 overs); Hassan Azad 53 (129); Brydon Carse 6/63 (20 overs)	Riverside Ground, Chester-le-Street; Umpires: Steve O'Shaughnessy and Chris Watts
Scorecard			363/8 (145 overs) (f/o); Mark Cosgrove 107* (269); Cameron Steel 2/35 (10 overs)	Riverside Ground, Chester-le-Street; Umpires: Steve O'Shaughnessy and Chris Watts
Toss uncontested, Leicestershire elected to field.; Points: Durham 13, Leicestershire 8.

==== September ====
10–12 September 2019	Worcestershire (H)	v	Glamorgan	Worcestershire won by 155 runs
Scorecard	205 (70 overs); Riki Wessels (45 (35); Michael Hogan 4/53 (16 overs)		193 (65.5 overs); David Lloyd 35 (101); Charlie Morris 5/73 (17.5 overs)	New Road, Worcester; Umpires: Neil Bainton and Jeremy Lloyds
Scorecard	299 (95.2 overs); Daryl Mitchell 139 (282); Samit Patel 4/59 (31 overs)		156 (38.2 overs); Chris Cooke 45 (73); Joe Leach 2/24 (10 overs)	New Road, Worcester; Umpires: Neil Bainton and Jeremy Lloyds
Toss uncontested, Glamorgan elected to field.; Points: Worcestershire 20, Glamorgan 3.

10–12 September 2019	Durham	v	Middlesex (H)	Durham won by 44 runs
Scorecard	147 (54 overs); Peter Handscomb 54 (72); Steven Finn 4/41 (12 overs)		143 (43.4 overs); Dawid Malan 24 (36); Ben Raine 5/26 (12 overs)	Lord's, London; Umpires: Richard Kettleborough and Russell Warren
Scorecard	191 (69.5 overs); Angus Robson 64 (156); James Harris 3/43 (15 overs)		151 (48.4 overs); Sam Robson 65 (115); Brydon Carse 6/26 (9.4 overs)	Lord's, London; Umpires: Richard Kettleborough and Russell Warren
Middlesex won the toss and elected to field.; Scott Steel (Durham) made his first-class debut.; Points: Durham 19, Middlesex 3.

10–12 September 2019	Derbyshire	v	Lancashire (H)	Lancashire won by an innings and 45 runs
Scorecard	244 (78.4 overs); Billy Godleman 111 (212); Richard Gleeson 5/64 (22 overs)		418 (127.4 overs); Josh Bohannon 174 (283); Ravi Rampaul 3/47 (19 overs)	Old Trafford, Manchester; Umpires: Jeff Evans and Ian Blackwell
Scorecard	129 (51 overs); Alex Hughes 33 (90); Tom Bailey 3/14 (7 overs)			Old Trafford, Manchester; Umpires: Jeff Evans and Ian Blackwell
Derbyshire won the toss and elected to bat.; Points: Lancashire 23, Derbyshire 3.

10–13 September 2019	Leicestershire (H)	v	Northamptonshire	Northamptonshire won by 7 wickets
Scorecard	308 (105.3 overs); Hassan Azad 86 (167); Luke Procter 3/54 (22 overs)		357 (92.2 overs); Rob Keogh 132 (182); Will Davis 4/73 (20.2 overs)	Grace Road, Leicester; Umpires: Paul Pollard and Billy Taylor
Scorecard	189 (72.3 overs); Colin Ackermann 60 (121); Ben Sanderson 3/37 (18 overs)		142/3 (39.4 overs); Alex Wakely 44* (54); Alex Evans 1/14 (2 overs)	Grace Road, Leicester; Umpires: Paul Pollard and Billy Taylor
Toss uncontested, Northamptonshire elected to field.; Points: Northamptonshire 23, Leicestershire 6.

10–13 September 2019	Gloucestershire (H)	v	Sussex	Sussex won by 8 wickets
Scorecard	200 (77.5 overs); James Bracey 61 (123); Chris Jordan 3/49 (20 overs)		370 (101.5 overs); David Wiese 67 (97); David Payne 4/59 (29 overs)	County Ground, Bristol; Umpires: Ben Debenham and Steve O'Shaughnessy
Scorecard	243 (80.4 overs); Chris Dent 72 (103); Delray Rawlins 3/36 (10.4 overs)		74/2 (23.1 overs); Stiaan van Zyl 30* (30); David Payne 1/13 (6 overs)	County Ground, Bristol; Umpires: Ben Debenham and Steve O'Shaughnessy
Toss uncontested, Sussex elected to field.; Points: Sussex 23, Gloucestershire 4.

16–18 September 2019	Worcestershire (H)	v	Gloucestershire	Gloucestershire won by 6 wickets
Scorecard	221 (55 overs); Riki Wessels 72 (90); Ryan Higgins 4/55 (18 overs)		235 (65.2 overs); David Payne 43 (44); Ed Barnard 6/42 (14.2 overs)	New Road, Worcester; Umpires: Nick Cook and Paul Baldwin
Scorecard	128 (39.5 overs); Charlie Morris 29* (48); Ryan Higgins 4/34 (13 overs)		115/4 (42.3 overs); Josh Shaw 38* (53); Adam Finch 2/23 (8.3 overs)	New Road, Worcester; Umpires: Nick Cook and Paul Baldwin
Toss uncontested, Gloucestershire elected to field.; Points: Gloucestershire 20, Worcestershire 4.

16–19 September 2019	Derbyshire (H)	v	Sussex	Derbyshire won by 181 runs
Scorecard	138 (46.1 overs); Anuj Dal 35 (51); David Wiese 4/18 (10.1 overs)		231 (60.5 overs); Stiaan van Zyl 60 (104); Luis Reece 5/63 (20 overs)	County Ground, Derby; Umpires: Paul Pollard and Ben Debenham
Scorecard	437 (98.3 overs); Luis Reece 184 (189); Ollie Robinson 5/88 (24 overs)		163 (52.2 overs); Phil Salt 38 (73); Matthew Critchley 3/9 (5.2 overs)	County Ground, Derby; Umpires: Paul Pollard and Ben Debenham
Toss uncontested, Sussex elected to field.; Mattie McKiernan (Derbyshire) made his first-class debut.; Points: Derbyshire 19, Sussex 4.

16–19 September 2019	Glamorgan (H)	v	Leicestershire	Glamorgan won by 291 runs
Scorecard	435 (116.4 overs); Chris Cooke 96 (92); Chris Wright 5/64 (25.4 overs)		263 (82.1 overs); Chris Wright 60 (86); Samit Patel 4/58 (26.1 overs)	Sophia Gardens, Cardiff; Umpires: Billy Taylor and Neil Bainton
Scorecard	251/5d (61.3 overs); Kraigg Brathwaite 103* (189); Chris Wright 2/67 (14.3 overs)		132 (70.4 overs); Harry Dearden 37 (59); Andrew Salter 3/6 (10 overs)	Sophia Gardens, Cardiff; Umpires: Billy Taylor and Neil Bainton
Toss uncontested, Leicestershire elected to field.; Points: Glamorgan 24, Leicestershire 4.

16–19 September 2019	Lancashire (H)	v	Middlesex	Lancashire won by 104 runs
Scorecard	259 (75.2 overs); Liam Livingstone 84 (101); Nathan Sowter 3/42 (15.2 overs)		337 (103.2 overs); John Simpson 167* (259); Tom Bailey 5/78 (32 overs)	Old Trafford, Manchester; Umpires: Nigel Llong and Steve O'Shaughnessy
Scorecard	347 (102.5 overs); Keaton Jennings 97 (214); Miguel Cummins 4/77 (21 overs)		165 (61.2 overs); Martin Andersson 83 (167); Tom Bailey 5/41 (14 overs)	Old Trafford, Manchester; Umpires: Nigel Llong and Steve O'Shaughnessy
Toss uncontested, Middlesex elected to field.; Points: Lancashire 21, Middlesex 4.

16–19 September 2019	Northamptonshire (H)	v	Durham	Northamptonshire won by 169 runs
Scorecard	217 (59.1 overs); Adam Rossington 82 (70); Chris Rushworth 5/68 (21 overs)		131 (48.3 overs); Ned Eckersley 37 (79); Ben Sanderson 6/54 (18 overs)	County Ground, Northampton; Umpires: Peter Hartley and Russell Warren
Scorecard	315 (87 overs); Luke Procter 86* (142); Ben Raine 4/93 (27 overs)		232 (88.2 overs); Ned Eckersley 67* (134); Ben Hutton 5/59 (25 overs)	County Ground, Northampton; Umpires: Peter Hartley and Russell Warren
Toss uncontested, Durham elected to field.; Points: Northamptonshire 20, Durham 3.

23–26 September 2019	Durham (H)	v	Glamorgan	Match drawn
Scorecard	262/8 (86.4 overs); BJ Watling 104* (207); Michael Hogan 4/35 (19 overs)			Riverside Ground, Chester-le-Street; Umpires: Peter Hartley and Neil Mallender
Toss uncontested, Glamorgan elected to field.; No play was possible on Day 3 and 4 due to rain.; Solomon Bell (Durham) made his first-class debut.; Points: Durham 7, Glamorgan 7.

23–26 September 2019	Gloucestershire (H)	v	Northamptonshire	Match drawn
Scorecard	220/7 (73 overs); Graeme van Buuren 93 (155); Ben Sanderson 2/33 (14 overs)			County Ground, Bristol; Umpires: Mike Burns and David Millns
Toss uncontested, Northamptonshire elected to field.; No play was possible on Day 2 and 4 due to rain.; Emilio Gay (Northamptonshire) made his first-class debut.; Points: Northamptonshire 7, Gloucestershire 6.

23–26 September 2019	Leicestershire (H)	v	Lancashire	Match drawn
Scorecard	155 (67.1 overs); George Rhodes 43 (81); Richard Gleeson 6/43 (15.1 overs)		170 (47.3 overs); Steven Croft 44 (69); Ben Mike 3/41 (12 overs)	Grace Road, Leicester; Umpires: James Middlebrook and Steve O'Shaughnessy
Scorecard	191/3d (61 overs); Hassan Azad 83* (188); Richard Gleeson 3/57 (18 overs)			Grace Road, Leicester; Umpires: James Middlebrook and Steve O'Shaughnessy
Toss uncontested, Lancashire elated to field.; No play was possible on Day 2 due to rain.; Liam Hurt (Lancashire) made his first-class debut.; Points: Leicestershire 8, Lancashire 8.

23–26 September 2019	Middlesex (H)	v	Derbyshire	Match drawn
Scorecard	260 (89.1 overs); Sam Robson 93 (163); Luis Reece 4/61 (28 overs)		304/7 (77 overs); Leus du Plooy 100* (175); Ethan Bamber 5/93 (22 overs)	Lord's, London; Umpires: Billy Taylor and Ian Blackwell
Toss uncontested, Derbyshire elected to field.; Points: Derbyshire 11, Middlesex 9.

23–26 September 2019	Sussex (H)	v	Worcestershire	Match drawn
Scorecard	299/8 (85 overs); George Garton 59* (68); Charlie Morris 3/63 (18 overs)			County Ground, Hove; Umpires: Jeremy Lloyds and Paul Baldwin
Toss uncontested, Worcestershire elected to field.; No play was possible on Day 3 and 4 due to rain.; Tom Clark (Sussex) made his first-class debut.; Points: Sussex 7, Worcestershire 7.

== Standings ==
Teams receive 16 points for a win, 8 for a tie and 5 for a draw. Bonus points (a maximum of 5 batting points and 3 bowling points) may be scored during the first 110 overs of each team's first innings.

=== Division One ===
Team	Pld	W	L	T	D	A	Bat	Bowl	Ded	Pts
Essex (C)	14	9	1	0	4	0	26	38	0	228
Somerset	14	9	3	0	2	0	25	38	0	217
Hampshire	14	5	3	0	6	0	31	36	1	176
Kent	14	5	5	0	4	0	36	36	0	172
Yorkshire	14	5	4	0	5	0	24	36	0	165
Surrey	14	2	6	0	6	0	33	38	0	133
Warwickshire	14	3	6	0	5	0	26	32	0	131
Nottinghamshire (R)	14	0	10	0	4	0	16	32	1	67

Sources: ESPNcricinfo, ECB

- Essex were County Champions.
- Nottinghamshire were relegated to Division Two.
- Nottinghamshire were deducted one point for a slow over rate against Somerset in April.
- Hampshire were deducted one point for a slow over rate against Essex in June.

=== Division Two ===
Team	Pld	W	L	T	D	A	Bat	Bowl	Ded	Pts
Lancashire (P)	14	8	0	0	6	0	34	41	0	233
Northamptonshire (P)	14	5	2	0	7	0	35	38	0	188
Gloucestershire (P)	14	5	3	0	6	0	36	36	0	182
Glamorgan	14	4	3	0	7	0	35	34	1	167
Durham	14	5	5	0	4	0	21	36	0	157
Sussex	14	4	5	0	5	0	32	35	0	156
Derbyshire	14	4	6	0	4	0	23	38	0	145
Middlesex	14	3	5	0	6	0	24	33	2	133
Worcestershire	14	3	7	0	4	0	20	37	0	125
Leicestershire	14	1	6	0	7	0	24	32	0	107

Sources: BBC Sport, ESPNcricinfo, ECB

- Lancashire were Division Two champions.
- Lancashire, Northamptonshire and Gloucestershire were promoted to Division One.
- Glamorgan were deducted one point for a slow over rate against Middlesex in July.
- Middlesex were deducted two points for a slow over rate against Lancashire in September.

== Statistics ==
=== Division One ===
As of 26 September 2019

- Highest score by a team: Kent − 585/7d (144.1 overs) vs Warwickshire (June 30−3 July)
- Lowest score by a team (completed innings): Kent − 40 all out (18.1 overs) vs Essex (18−20 August)
- Top score by an individual: Dom Sibley (Warwickshire) − 244 (491) vs Kent (Jun 30−3 July)
- Best bowling figures by an individual: Kyle Abbott (Hampshire) − 9/40 (18.4 overs) vs Somerset (16−19 September)

==== Most runs ====
Player	Team	Matches	Innings	Runs	Average	HS	100s	50s
Dom Sibley	Warwickshire	12	21	1324	69.68	244	5	5
Gary Ballance	Yorkshire	13	23	975	46.42	159	5	3
Sam Northeast	Hampshire	13	22	969	51.00	169	3	5
Alastair Cook	Essex	14	24	913	45.68	125	1	7
Daniel Bell-Drummond	Kent	14	26	892	35.68	166	1	5

Source: ESPNcricinfo

==== Most wickets ====
Players	Team	Matches	Overs	Wickets	Average	BBI	5w	10w
Simon Harmer	Essex	14	595.5	83	18.28	8/98	10	2
Kyle Abbott	Hampshire	13	362.5	71	15.73	9/40	6	1
Jeetan Patel	Warwickshire	14	635.1	64	26.75	8/36	4	2
Matt Milnes	Kent	14	386.4	55	25.14	5/68	2	0
Darren Stevens	Kent	12	403.0	52	17.57	5/20	5	1

Source: ESPNcricinfo

=== Division Two ===
As of 26 September 2019

- Highest score by a team: Northamptonshire − 750 all out (227.3 overs) vs Glamorgan (11−14 April)
- Lowest score by a team (completed innings): Middlesex − 75 all out (21.4 overs) vs Sussex (18-20 August)
- Top score by an individual: Dane Vilas (Lancashire) − 266 (240) vs Glamorgan (18-20 August)
- Best bowling figures by an individual: Ollie Robinson (Sussex) − 8/34 (11 overs) vs Middlesex (18-20 August)

==== Most runs ====
Player	Team	Matches	Innings	Runs	Average	HS	100s	50s
Hassan Azad	Leicestershire	14	26	1189	54.04	137	3	8
Marnus Labuschagne	Glamorgan	10	18	1114	65.52	182	5	5
Chris Dent	Gloucestershire	14	24	1087	47.26	176	4	4
Dane Vilas	Lancashire	14	17	1036	79.69	266	2	7
Billy Godleman	Derbyshire	14	26	1008	38.76	227	4	2

Source: ESPNcricinfo

==== Most wickets ====
Players	Team	Matches	Overs	Wickets	Average	BBI	5w	10w
Chris Rushworth	Durham	14	486.4	69	18.42	6/39	4	1
Ollie Robinson	Sussex	11	380.3	63	16.44	8/34	6	3
Ben Sanderson	Northamptonshire	14	448.2	60	19.65	6/37	3	1
Ben Raine	Durham	14	463.4	54	21.83	6/27	3	0
Luis Reece	Derbyshire	14	371.0	52	19.65	6/58	3	0

Source: ESPNcricinfo
