= James Wainman =

English cricketer (born 1993)

Personal information
- Full name: James Charles Wainman
- Born: 25 January 1993 (age 33); Harrogate, North Yorkshire, England
- Batting: Right-handed
- Bowling: Left-arm medium-fast
- Role: Bowler

Domestic team information
- Years: Team
- 2014–2018: Yorkshire (squad no. 15)
- 2019: Lincolnshire
- 2019: Warwickshire
- FC debut: 30 June 2019 Warwickshire v Kent
- LA debut: 31 July 2014 Yorkshire v Sri Lanka A

Career statistics
Competition	FC	LA	T20
Matches	1	4	7
Runs scored	–	51	13
Batting average	–	25.50	–
100s/50s	–	0/0	0/0
Top score	–	33	12*
Balls bowled	138	198	120
Wickets	3	5	3
Bowling average	37.33	40.20	66.33
5 wickets in innings	0	0	0
10 wickets in match	0	0	0
Best bowling	3/112	3/51	1/27
Catches/stumpings	0/–	1/–	0/–
- Source: CricInfo, 30 September 2019

James Charles Wainman (born 25 January 1993) is an English cricketer. He was born at Harrogate in Yorkshire and was educated at Leeds Grammar School.

He joined the staff at Yorkshire County Cricket Club and made his debut on 31 July 2014 against the touring Sri Lanka A cricket team. He made his Twenty20 debut on 27 May 2016 for Yorkshire against Leicestershire Foxes in the 2016 NatWest t20 Blast, and played a total of six limited-overs matches for the county.

Wainman left Yorkshire at the end of the 2018 season and played in the 2019 Minor Counties Trophy for Lincolnshire before joining Warwickshire, initially on a short-term contract as cover for injured players, in June. He made his first-class cricket debut on 30 June 2019, against Kent in the 2019 County Championship, taking three wickets on debut.
