= Hassan Azad =

English cricketer (born 1994)

Personal information
- Full name: Mohammad Hassan Azad
- Born: 7 January 1994 (age 32); Quetta, Balochistan, Pakistan
- Batting: Left-handed
- Bowling: Right-arm off break

Domestic team information
- Years: Team
- 2015–2019: Loughborough MCCU
- 2019–2022: Leicestershire (squad no. 42)
- 2023: Northamptonshire (squad no. 89)
- First-class debut: 2 April 2015; Loughborough MCCU v Hampshire

Career statistics
Competition	First-class
Matches	61
Runs scored	3,190
Batting average	33.93
100s/50s	7/17
Top score	152
Balls bowled	43
Wickets	1
Bowling average	25.00
5 wickets in innings	0
10 wickets in match	0
Best bowling	1/15
Catches/stumpings	25/–
- Source: Cricinfo, 28 September 2023

Mohammad Hassan Azad (born 7 January 1994) is an English cricketer who most recently played for Northamptonshire. He is a left handed opening batsman and an off-break bowler.

== Career ==
Azad began his career in the academy at Nottinghamshire. He made his first-class debut on 2 April 2015 for Loughborough MCCU against Hampshire.

Having performed well for the second XI during 2018, in March 2019 Azad signed for Leicestershire County Cricket Club ahead of the 2019 County Championship. He played in Leicestershire's match against Loughborough MCCU, in the Marylebone Cricket Club University fixtures, scoring his maiden first-class century. His good form continued through the first half of the County Championship season, and he was voted PCA Player of the Month for June. In August 2019, his performances were further rewarded when he was offered a further two-year contract.

In March 2023, Northamptonshire announced the signing of Azad on a short-term deal.
