= Christopher Shaw (cricketer) =

English cricketer (born 1964)

Personal information
- Full name: Christopher Shaw
- Born: 3 January 1996 (age 30); Hemsworth, West Riding of Yorkshire, England
- Batting: Right-handed
- Bowling: Right-arm fast-medium
- Role: Bowler
- Relatives: Josh Shaw (son)

Domestic team information
- Years: Team
- 1984–1988: Yorkshire

Career statistics
Competition	First-class	List A
Matches	61	48
Runs scored	340	127
Batting average	10.96	12.70
100s/50s	0/0	0/0
Top score	31	26
Balls bowled	8,244	2,045
Wickets	123	58
Bowling average	33.34	24.06
5 wickets in innings	3	1
10 wickets in match	0	0
Best bowling	6/64	5/41
Catches/stumpings	9/–	8/–
- Source: Cricinfo, 31 August 2026

Christopher Shaw (born 17 February 1964, Hemsworth, Yorkshire, England) is an English first-class cricketer, who played sixty one first-class games for Yorkshire County Cricket Club between 1984 and 1988. He also played in 48 List A one day matches.

Shaw also appeared for the Yorkshire Second XI (1984–1991), Yorkshire Under-25s (1984–1988), National Association of Young Cricketers North (1981–1982), National Association of Young Cricketers (1981–1982), Yorkshire Cricket Association Under-19s (1983) and also for Yorkshire in non first-class matches (1986–1988).

A right arm fast medium bowler, Shaw took 123 wickets at 33.34, with a best of 6 for 64 against Lancashire in the Roses Match. He also took five wickets against both Kent and Northamptonshire. Batting right-handed, he scored 340 runs at 10.96, with a top score of 31 against Nottinghamshire. He also took nine catches.

He took 58 wickets in one day cricket, with a best analysis of 5 for 41 against Hampshire. He scored 127 runs at 12.7, with a highest score of 26 against Glamorgan. He took eight catches in the field.
