= Rob Yates (English cricketer) =

English cricketer (born 1999)

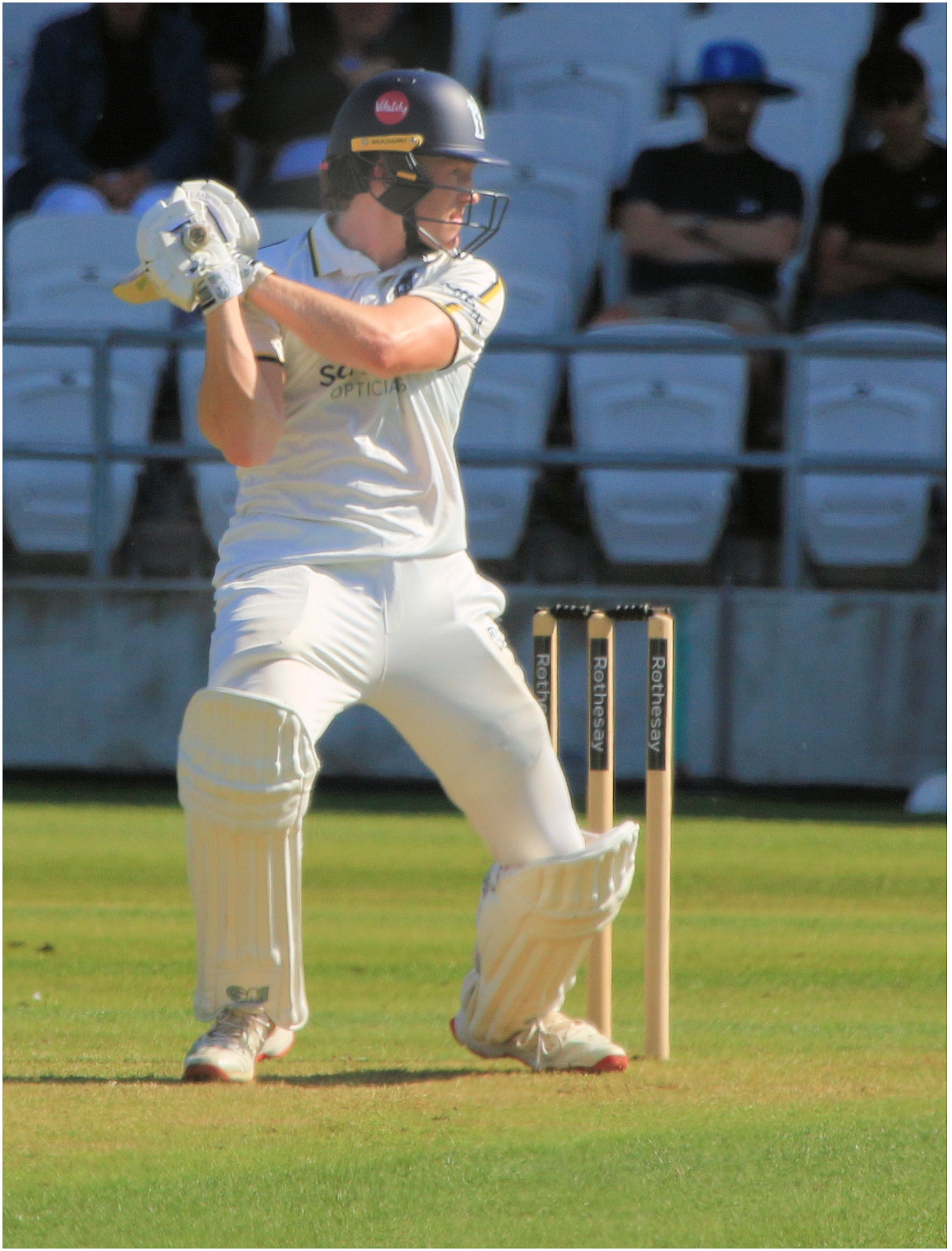
- Yates in 2025

Personal information
- Full name: Robert Michael Yates
- Born: 19 September 1999 (age 27); Solihull, West Midlands, England
- Batting: Left-handed
- Bowling: Right-arm off break

Domestic team information
- Years: Team
- 2019–present: Warwickshire (squad no. 17)
- FC debut: 14 May 2019 Warwickshire v Hampshire
- LA debut: 6 May 2019 Warwickshire v Leicestershire

Career statistics
Competition	FC	LA	T20
Matches	98	48	52
Runs scored	4,772	1,608	1,192
Batting average	32.02	34.21	24.32
100s/50s	12/20	4/7	0/9
Top score	228*	114	72
Balls bowled	3,697	1,022	90
Wickets	41	16	5
Bowling average	49.58	60.87	24.80
5 wickets in innings	0	0	0
10 wickets in match	0	0	0
Best bowling	4/37	2/31	4/22
Catches/stumpings	155/–	39/–	25/–
- Source: Cricinfo, 26 September 2026

Robert Michael Yates (born 19 September 1999) is an English cricketer. He made his List A debut on 6 May 2019, for Warwickshire in the 2019 Royal London One-Day Cup. He made his first-class debut on 14 May 2019, for Warwickshire in the 2019 County Championship. He made his Twenty20 debut on 11 September 2020, for the Birmingham Bears in the 2020 T20 Blast. Yates was educated at Warwick School.
