= Sol Bell =

English cricketer (born 2001)

Solomon Bell
Personal information
- Full name: Solomon Jack D Bell
- Born: 27 February 2001 (age 25); Newcastle, Tyne and Wear, England
- Source: Cricinfo, 23 September 2019

Solomon Bell (born 27 February 2001) is an English cricketer. He made his first-class debut on 23 September 2019, for Durham in the 2019 County Championship.
