= Steven Patterson =

English cricketer (born 1983)

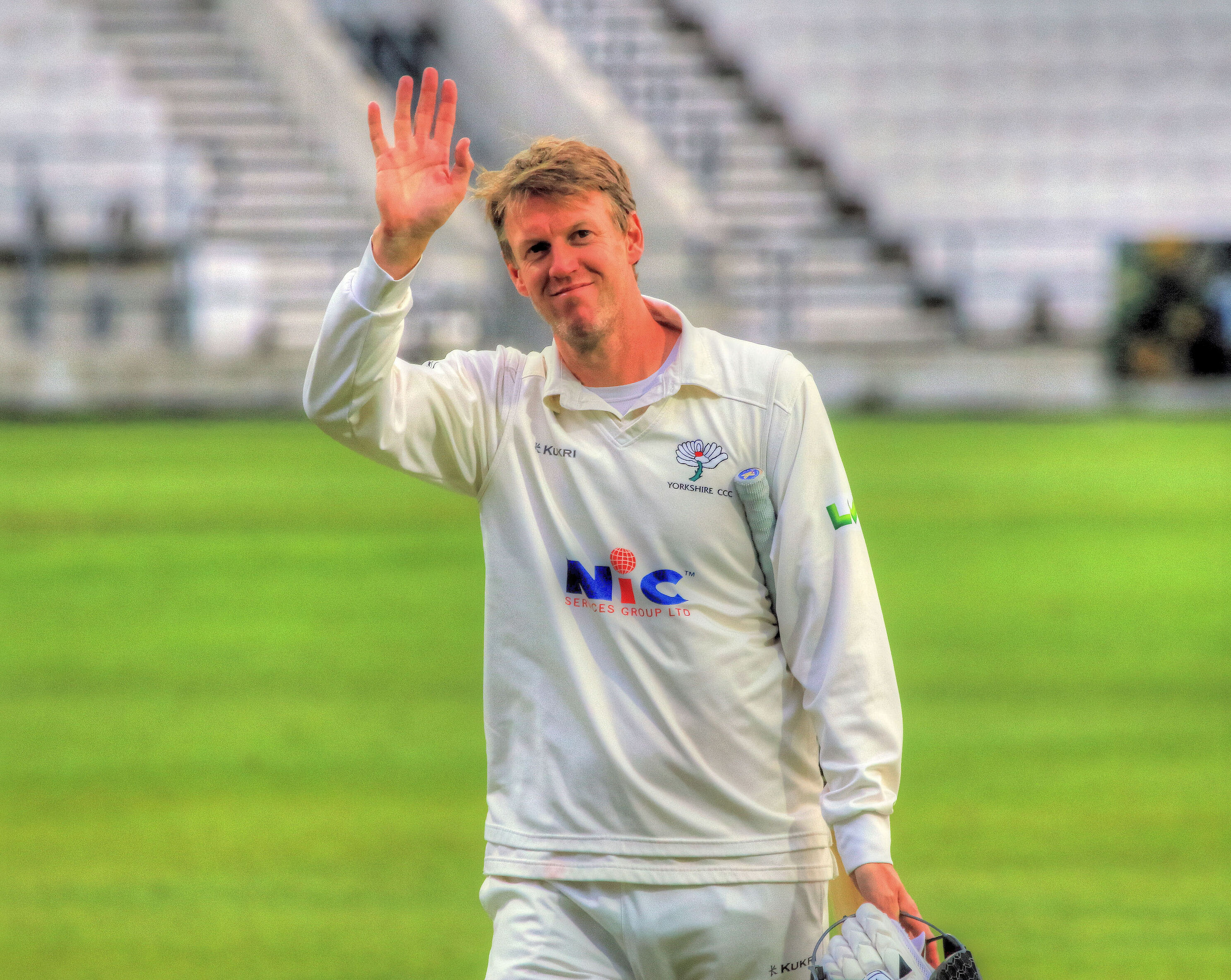
- Patterson in his final match for Yorkshire in 2022

Personal information
- Full name: Steven Andrew Patterson
- Born: 3 October 1983 (age 43); Beverley, Humberside, England
- Height: 6 ft 4 in (1.93 m)
- Batting: Right-handed
- Bowling: Right-arm medium-fast
- Role: Bowler

Domestic team information
- Years: Team
- 2002–2022: Yorkshire (squad no. 17)
- FC debut: 3 August 2005 Yorkshire v Bangladesh A
- LA debut: 29 August 2002 Yorkshire v Northamptonshire

Career statistics
Competition	FC	LA	T20
Matches	185	97	63
Runs scored	2,699	250	9
Batting average	15.16	12.50	1.80
100s/50s	0/4	0/0	0/0
Top score	63*	25*	3*
Balls bowled	30,432	4,116	1,290
Wickets	489	122	61
Bowling average	27.57	28.88	29.68
5 wickets in innings	10	2	0
10 wickets in match	0	0	0
Best bowling	6/40	6/32	4/30
Catches/stumpings	37/–	17/–	10/–
- Source: ESPNcricinfo, 2 October 2022

Steven Andrew Patterson (born 3 October 1983) is a former English first class cricketer, who played for Yorkshire County Cricket Club.

A tall seam bowler and right hand lower order batsman, Patterson made his first-class debut in 2005 against Bangladesh A, having first played one-day cricket for his native county in 2002. Patterson attended Leeds University from 2002 to 2005, where he studied mathematics whilst playing part-time for Yorkshire County Cricket Club. Six first-class matches, up to the end of 2006, brought him 85 runs at 14.16, with a best score of 46 and two wickets.

Patterson secured a regular County Championship place in the side at the start of the 2010 season.

Patterson was appointed as captain of the side for the 2019 season, and continued in that role until 2022. In September 2022 he announced his retirement.
