= Josh Shaw (cricketer) =

English cricketer (born 1996)

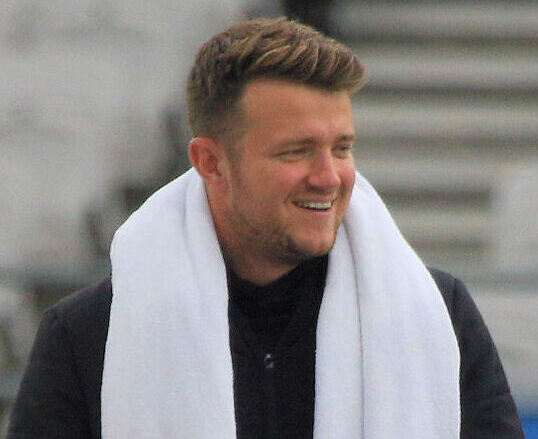
- Shaw in 2022

Personal information
- Full name: Joshua Shaw
- Born: 3 January 1996 (age 30); Wakefield, West Yorkshire, England
- Batting: Right-handed
- Bowling: Right-arm medium-fast
- Role: Bowler
- Relatives: Christopher Shaw (father)

Domestic team information
- Years: Team
- 2015–2019: Yorkshire (squad no. 25)
- 2016–2017; 2019: → Gloucestershire (on loan)
- 2020–2025: Gloucestershire (squad no. 5)
- 2026–present: Somerset (squad no. 5)
- First-class debut: 31 March 2016 Gloucestershire v Durham MCCU
- List A debut: 2 July 2019 Gloucestershire v Australia A

Career statistics
Competition	FC	LA	T20
Matches	67	33	60
Runs scored	1,099	94	74
Batting average	15.47	7.83	10.57
100s/50s	0/0	0/0	0/0
Top score	45	34	14*
Balls bowled	9,373	1,593	1,024
Wickets	148	36	63
Bowling average	39.61	43.13	23.74
5 wickets in innings	2	0	0
10 wickets in match	0	0	0
Best bowling	5/79	4/36	3/27
Catches/stumpings	11/–	6/–	10/–
- Source: Cricinfo, 30 August 2026

Joshua Shaw (born 3 January 1996) is an English cricketer who plays for Somerset. He is a right-arm medium-fast bowler who also bats right-handed. He made his Twenty20 debut for Yorkshire against Durham in the 2015 NatWest t20 Blast in July 2015. He made his first-class cricket debut for Gloucestershire against Durham MCC University on 31 March 2016. He made his List A debut for Gloucestershire against the Australia A cricket team on 2 July 2019.

In September 2025, Shaw signed for Somerset on a three-year contract.
