= Tom Lace =

English cricketer (born 1998)

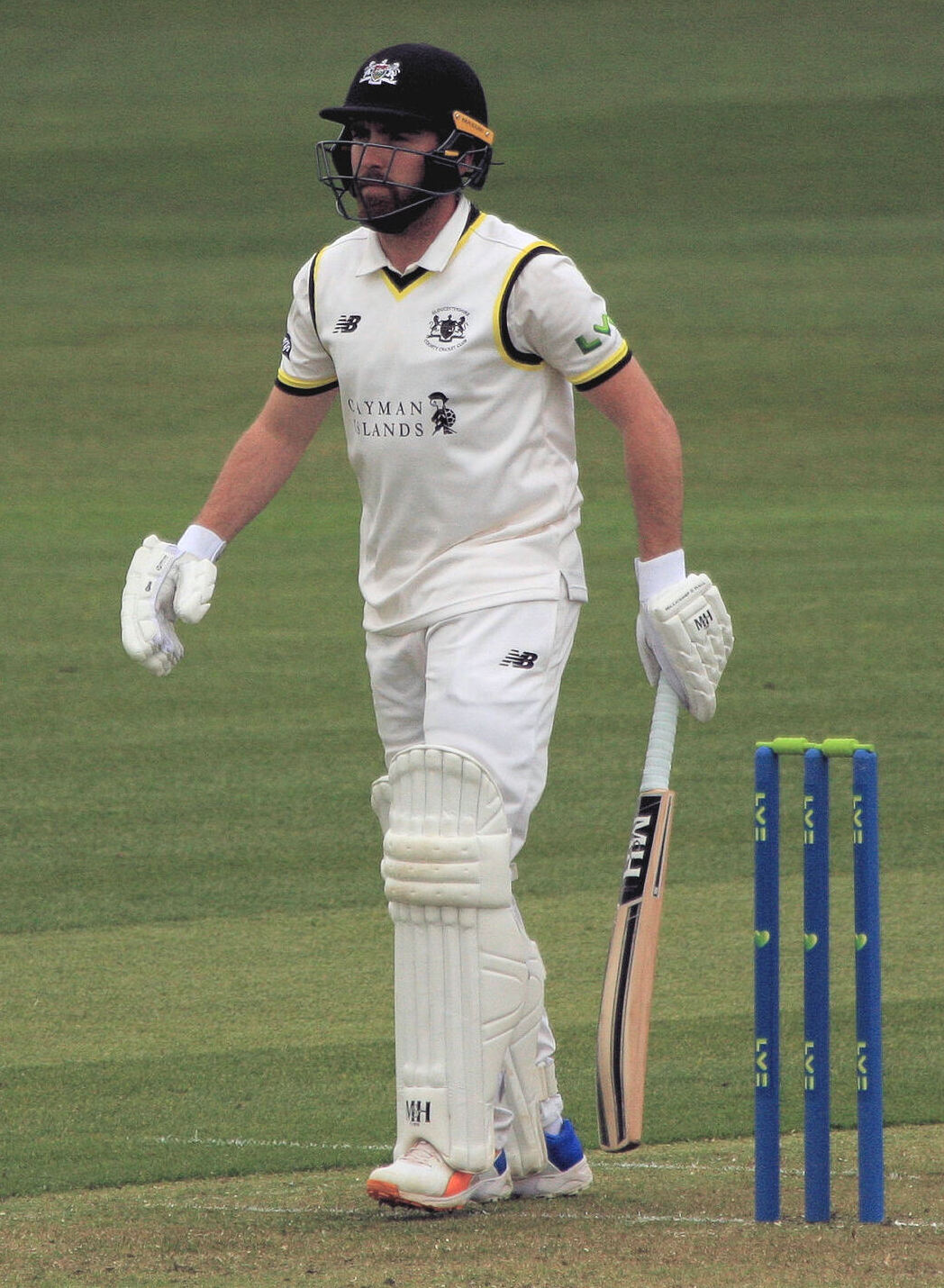
- Lace in 2022

Personal information
- Full name: Thomas Cresswell Lace
- Born: 27 May 1998 (age 28); Hammersmith, London, England
- Batting: Right-handed
- Role: Batsman, wicket-keeper

Domestic team information
- Years: Team
- 2017–2019: Middlesex (squad no. 27)
- 2018–2019: → Derbyshire (on loan)
- 2020–2023: Gloucestershire (squad no. 8)
- First-class debut: 29 August 2018 Derbys v Kent

Career statistics
Competition	FC	LA	T20
Matches	38	15	1
Runs scored	1,914	205	5
Batting average	29.90	15.76	5.00
100s/50s	4/9	0/0	0/0
Top score	143	48	5
Catches/stumpings	22/–	3/–	0/–
- Source: Cricinfo, 4 July 2022

Thomas Cresswell Lace (born 27 May 1998) is an English former cricketer. He played for Middlesex, Derbyshire and Gloucestershire.

Lace came through the youth setup at Middlesex. He spent two seasons on loan with Derbyshire, making his first-class debut for them in the 2018 County Championship on 29 August 2018, and his List A debut on 19 April 2019, in the 2019 Royal London One-Day Cup.

Having scored 835 runs, including three centuries, at an average of 43.33 in the County Championship for Derbyshire in 2019, Lace returned to Middlesex where he signed a new contract to keep him at the club through the 2022 season. In August 2020, he joined Gloucestershire, after Middlesex agreed to let him go. He made his Twenty20 debut on 29 May 2022, for Gloucestershire against the Sri Lanka Cricket Development XI during their tour of England. Gloucestershire announced at the end of the 2023 season that his contract would not be renewed, Lace subsequently confirmed his retirement.
