= Ben Sanderson =

English cricketer (born 1989)

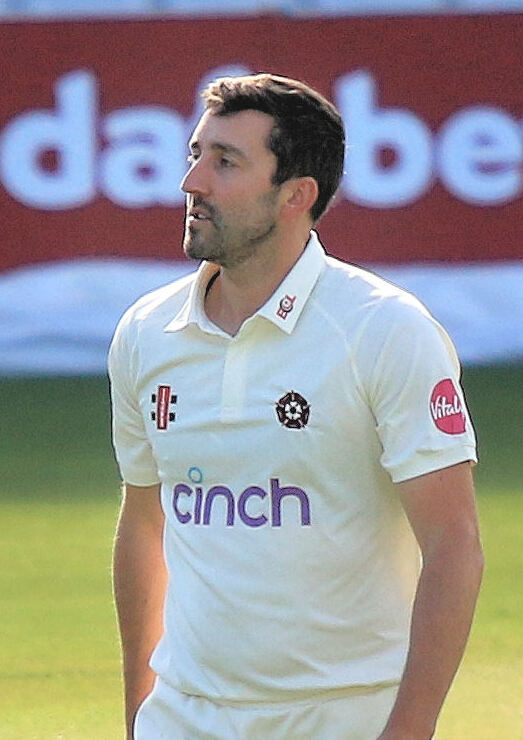
- Sanderson in 2024

Personal information
- Full name: Ben William Sanderson
- Born: 3 January 1989 (age 37); Sheffield, South Yorkshire, England
- Batting: Right-handed
- Bowling: Right arm medium-fast
- Role: Bowler

Domestic team information
- Years: Team
- 2008–2011: Yorkshire (squad no. 18)
- 2015–present: Northamptonshire (squad no. 26)
- 2026: Trent Rockets
- First-class debut: 14 May 2008 Yorkshire v Durham
- List A debut: 25 April 2010 Yorkshire v Essex

Career statistics
| Competition | FC | LA | T20 |
|---|---|---|---|
| Matches | 128 | 53 | 124 |
| Runs scored | 1,299 | 169 | 160 |
| Batting average | 10.14 | 8.89 | 8.42 |
| 100s/50s | 0/1 | 0/0 | 0/0 |
| Top score | 65 | 31 | 27 |
| Balls bowled | 23,759 | 2,171 | 2,471 |
| Wickets | 478 | 67 | 153 |
| Bowling average | 22.56 | 28.49 | 23.05 |
| 5 wickets in innings | 26 | 0 | 1 |
| 10 wickets in match | 4 | 0 | 0 |
| Best bowling | 8/73 | 3/17 | 6/8 |
| Catches/stumpings | 17/– | 13/– | 25/– |
- Source: ESPNcricinfo, 27 September 2026

Ben William Sanderson (born 3 January 1989) is an English first-class cricketer. He is a seam bowler, capable of opening the bowling, and an aggressive batsman and fielder.

Sanderson began his career with Yorkshire County Cricket Club he made his first-class debut for Yorkshire, against Durham, at the Riverside Ground in Chester-le-Street, on 14 May 2008. In September 2011, Yorkshire announced that Sanderson was being released by the county. He then spent time playing minor county cricket for Shropshire, club cricket for Rotherham Town and working as a builder.

On 18 July 2015 Sanderson made his return to first-class cricket playing for Northants against Derbyshire, and later signed a two-year contract to play for Northants. During the 2016 season, he took 55 first-class wickets at an average of 21.89, including career best figures of 8/73 against Gloucestershire in September. He was also on the victorious side in the Twenty20 cup, taking 3/31 against Durham in the final. He was rewarded for these performances with a new three-year contract.
