= 2018 County Championship =

English cricket tournament

- Tournament logo
- Dates: 13 April – 27 September 2018
- Administrator: England and Wales Cricket Board
- Cricket format: First-class cricket (4 days)
- Tournament format: League system
- Champions: Surrey
- Participants: 18
- Most runs: Div 1: Rory Burns (1,359); Div 2: Ian Bell (1,027)
- Most wickets: Div 1: Tom Bailey (64); Div 2: Matt Henry (75)

The 2018 County Championship, known as the 2018 Specsavers County Championship for sponsorship reasons, is the 119th cricket County Championship season. As in 2017, Division One has eight teams and Division Two has ten teams, with two teams relegated and two promoted at the end of the season.

The first round of matches began on 13 April and the final round of matches were scheduled to end on 27 September. Most of the matches of the Championship were played as day matches, although each team played one day-night match during the season.

In September 2018, the match between Somerset and Lancashire at Taunton, Somerset finished as a tie. It was the first tie in a County Championship game since 2003, Somerset's first tied match since 1939 and Lancashire's first since 1952. By winning their game against Worcestershire between the 10th and 13 September, Surrey took an unassailable lead at the top of Division One, making them champions.

== Teams ==
The 2018 Championship was divided into two divisions, Division One with eight teams and Division Two with 10. Teams in both divisions played a total of 14 games, with all Division One teams playing each other twice, while Division Two teams played five others twice and four once.

Home grounds of each county

=== Division One ===
Team promoted from Division Two in 2017

Team	Primary home ground	Other grounds	Coach	Captain	Overseas player(s)
Essex	County Ground, Chelmsford	—	(England) Anthony McGrath	(Netherlands) Ryan ten Doeschate	(New Zealand) Neil Wagner (Australia) Peter Siddle (India) Murali Vijay
Hampshire	Rose Bowl, Southampton	—	(England) Craig White	(England) James Vince	(South Africa) Hashim Amla (South Africa) Dale Steyn
Lancashire	Old Trafford, Manchester	Trafalgar Road Ground, Southport	(England) Glen Chapple	(England) Liam Livingstone (Apr.–Jul.) (South Africa) Dane Vilas (Jul.–)	(Australia) Joe Mennie (South Africa) Keshav Maharaj
Somerset	County Ground, Taunton	—	(England) Jason Kerr	(England) Tom Abell	(Australia) Matt Renshaw (Pakistan) Azhar Ali
Surrey	The Oval, London	Woodbridge Road, Guildford	(Australia) Michael Di Venuto	(England) Rory Burns	(South Africa) Dean Elgar (South Africa) Theunis de Bruyn (Australia) Aaron Finch
Yorkshire	Headingley, Leeds	North Marine Road Ground, Scarborough	(England) Andrew Gale	(England) Gary Ballance (Apr.–May.) (England) Joe Root (May) (England) Steven Patterson (Jun.–Jul., Sep.) (England) David Willey (Aug.–Sep.) (England) Adam Lyth (Sep.)	(India) Cheteshwar Pujara (New Zealand) Kane Williamson (New Zealand) Jeet Raval
Nottinghamshire	Trent Bridge, Nottingham	—	(England) Peter Moores	(England) Steven Mullaney	(New Zealand) Ross Taylor (Cricket West Indies) Kraigg Brathwaite
Worcestershire	New Road, Worcester	—	(England) Kevin Sharp	(England) Joe Leach (Apr.–Jun.) (England) Brett D'Oliveira (Jun.–)	(Australia) Travis Head (Australia) Callum Ferguson (South Africa) Wayne Parnell (India) Ravichandran Ashwin

=== Division Two ===
Team relegated from Division One in 2017

Team	Primary home ground	Other grounds	Coach	Captain	Overseas player(s)
Middlesex	Lord's, London	Merchant Taylors' School Ground, Northwood; Uxbridge Cricket Club Ground, Uxbridge	(England) Richard Scott (Apr.–Jul.) (England) Richard Johnson (Jul.–)	(England) Dawid Malan (England) Sam Robson (Apr.)	(Australia) Hilton Cartwright
Warwickshire	Edgbaston, Birmingham	—	(England) Jim Troughton	(New Zealand) Jeetan Patel	(New Zealand) Jeetan Patel
Derbyshire	County Ground, Derby	Queen's Park, Chesterfield	(England) Kim Barnett (Apr.–Jul.); Vacant (Jul.–Aug.) (Zimbabwe) Dave Houghton (Aug.–)	(England) Billy Godleman	(South Africa) Duanne Olivier (New Zealand) Lockie Ferguson
Durham	Riverside Ground, Chester-le-Street	—	(England) Jon Lewis	(England) Paul Collingwood	(South Africa) Aiden Markram (New Zealand) Tom Latham (India) Axar Patel
Glamorgan	Sophia Gardens, Cardiff	Penrhyn Avenue, Rhos-on-Sea; St Helen's, Swansea	(Wales) Robert Croft	(Australia) Michael Hogan	(Australia) Shaun Marsh (Australia) Usman Khawaja (South Africa) Stephen Cook
Gloucestershire	County Ground, Bristol	College Ground, Cheltenham	(England) Richard Dawson	(England) Chris Dent	(Australia) Daniel Worrall
Kent	St Lawrence Ground, Canterbury	Nevill Ground, Royal Tunbridge Wells	(England) Matt Walker	(England) Sam Billings (England) Joe Denly (Apr.–May)	(New Zealand) Matt Henry
Leicestershire	Grace Road, Leicester	—	(England) Paul Nixon	(England) Michael Carberry (Apr.–May) (England) Paul Horton (May–)	(India) Varun Aaron (Pakistan) Mohammad Abbas
Northamptonshire	County Ground, Northampton	—	(England) David Ripley	(England) Alex Wakely	(South Africa) Rory Kleinveldt (New Zealand) Doug Bracewell (Sri Lanka) Seekkuge Prasanna
Sussex	County Ground, Hove	Arundel Castle Cricket Club Ground, Arundel	(Australia) Jason Gillespie	(England) Ben Brown	(India) Ishant Sharma

== Results ==
Fixtures for the 2018 County Championship were announced on 29 November 2017, with the previous season's champions Essex beginning the defence of their title against Yorkshire at Headingley.

In total, 56 matches were played in Division One, with 70 played in Division Two.

=== Division One ===
==== April ====
13–16 April 2018	Yorkshire (H)	v	Essex	Match abandoned
Scorecard				Headingley, Leeds
No toss; No play possible on all days due to rain and wet outfield.; Points: Yorkshire 5, Essex 5.

13–16 April 2018	Hampshire (H)	v	Worcestershire	Hampshire won by 196 runs
Scorecard	290 (75.4 overs); Gareth Berg 75* (101); Joe Leach 4/42 (15.4 overs)		211 (66.2 overs); Ben Cox 65 (75); Kyle Abbott 3/45 (19 overs)	Rose Bowl, Southampton; Umpires: Jeremy Lloyds and Martin Saggers
Scorecard	244 (66.2 overs); Kyle Abbott 51 (74); Joe Leach 3/55 (16 overs)		127 (49.5 overs); Travis Head 45* (61); Kyle Abbott 4/45 (17 overs)	Rose Bowl, Southampton; Umpires: Jeremy Lloyds and Martin Saggers
Toss uncontested, Worcestershire elected to field first; Points: Hampshire 21, Worcestershire 4.

13–16 April 2018	Lancashire (H)	v	Nottinghamshire	Nottinghamshire won by 6 wickets
Scorecard	158 (61 overs); Dane Vilas 49 (92); Jake Ball 5/43 (17 overs)		222 (72.2 overs); Riki Wessels 44 (76); Tom Bailey 3/26 (19 overs)	Old Trafford, Manchester; Umpires: Neil Mallender and Graham Lloyd
Scorecard	73 (34.2 overs); Keaton Jennings 27 (82); Harry Gurney 6/25 (12.2 overs)		10/4 (5 overs); Samit Patel 4* (4); Joe Mennie 3/4 (2 overs)	Old Trafford, Manchester; Umpires: Neil Mallender and Graham Lloyd
Toss uncontested, Nottinghamshire elected to field first; No play possible on Day 1 due to rain.; Points: Nottinghamshire 20, Lancashire 3.

20–22 April 2018	Essex (H)	v	Lancashire	Essex won by 31 runs
Scorecard	150 (50 overs); Peter Siddle 33* (38); Joe Mennie 3/52 (13 overs)		144 (47.1 overs); Liam Livingstone 33 (40); Jamie Porter 5/26 (12 overs)	County Ground, Chelmsford; Umpires: Neil Bainton and Rob Bailey
Scorecard	313 (90.1 overs); James Foster 69 (125); Joe Mennie 3/47 (18 overs)		288 (82.2 overs); Jordan Clark 59 (80); Jamie Porter 4/54 (19.2 overs)	County Ground, Chelmsford; Umpires: Neil Bainton and Rob Bailey
Toss uncontested, Lancashire elected to field first; Points: Essex 19, Lancashire 3.

20–22 April 2018	Somerset (H)	v	Worcestershire	Somerset won by 83 runs
Scorecard	202 (56.1 overs); Matt Renshaw 101* (139); Ed Barnard 5/52 (16 overs)		179 (44 overs); Ed Barnard 50 (66); Lewis Gregory 4/51 (14 overs)	County Ground, Taunton; Umpires: Ian Gould and Steve O'Shaughnessy
Scorecard	255 (69.2 overs); James Hildreth 111* (157); Ed Barnard 6/37 (19.2 overs)		195 (51.4 overs); Ed Barnard 45* (72); Lewis Gregory 3/35 (13 overs)	County Ground, Taunton; Umpires: Ian Gould and Steve O'Shaughnessy
Toss uncontested, Worcestershire elected to field first; Points: Somerset 20, Worcestershire 3.

20–23 April 2018	Surrey (H)	v	Hampshire	Surrey won by 139 runs
Scorecard	211 (73.1 overs); Ben Foakes 46 (73); Liam Dawson 4/30 (11.1 overs)		147 (50.2 overs); Hashim Amla 55 (83); Rikki Clarke 4/39 (15.2 overs)	Kensington Oval, London; Umpires: Richard Illingworth and David Millns
Scorecard	407/9d (109.3 overs); Ollie Pope 145 (191); Kyle Abbott 3/72 (19 overs)		332 (115.3 overs); Sam Northeast 129 (254); Amar Virdi 4/79 (33 overs)	Kensington Oval, London; Umpires: Richard Illingworth and David Millns
Surrey won the toss and elected to bat; Points: Surrey 20, Hampshire 3.

20–23 April 2018	Yorkshire (H)	v	Nottinghamshire	Yorkshire won by 164 runs
Scorecard	256 (74.1 overs); Andrew Hodd 62 (116); Luke Fletcher 4/47 (18.1 overs)		188 (46.2 overs); Ross Taylor 57 (70); Ben Coad 4/49 (13.2 overs)	Headingley, Leeds; Umpires: Nick Cook and Michael Gough
Scorecard	334 (108.2 overs); Gary Ballance 82 (166); Jake Ball 3/69 (22 overs)		238 (58.4 overs); Tom Moores 40* (69); Ben Coad 6/81 (19.4 overs)	Headingley, Leeds; Umpires: Nick Cook and Michael Gough
Toss uncontested, Nottinghamshire elected to field first; Points: Yorkshire 21, Nottinghamshire 3.

27–30 April 2018	Hampshire (H)	v	Essex	Match drawn
Scorecard	351/7d (108.4 overs); James Adams 87 (264); Peter Siddle 3/62 (29 overs)		300/6 (70.5 overs); Ravi Bopara 84* (125); Brad Wheal 2/63 (12.5 overs)	Rose Bowl, Southampton; Umpires: Paul Baldwin, Tim Robinson, Neil Bainton
Toss uncontested, Essex elected to field first; Points: Hampshire 11, Essex 10.

27–30 April 2018	Lancashire (H)	v	Surrey	Match drawn
Scorecard	439/9d (118.5 overs); Jordan Clark 78 (101); Amar Virdi 4/80 (23.5 overs)		235 (89.4 overs); Scott Borthwick 79 (137); Graham Onions 4/49 (19.4 overs)	Old Trafford, Manchester; Umpires: Richard Kettleborough and Peter Hartley
Scorecard			199/6 (90.3 overs) (f/o); Ben Foakes 57 (119); Tom Bailey 4/13 (19 overs)	Old Trafford, Manchester; Umpires: Richard Kettleborough and Peter Hartley
Toss uncontested, Surrey elected to field first; No play possible on Day 1 due to rain.; Points: Lancashire 12, Surrey 8.

27–30 April 2018	Somerset (H)	v	Yorkshire	Somerset won by 118 runs
Scorecard	216 (47.1 overs); Matt Renshaw 112 (99); Jack Brooks 5/57 (15 overs)		96 (49.4 overs); Harry Brook 32 (78); Tim Groenewald 3/12 (9 overs)	County Ground, Taunton; Umpires: Alex Wharf and Mike Burns
Scorecard	200 (57.3 overs); Tom Abell 82 (137); Ben Coad 4/61 (20.3 overs)		202 (86.1 overs); Jack Leaning 68 (172); Craig Overton 3/43 (21.1 overs)	County Ground, Taunton; Umpires: Alex Wharf and Mike Burns
Toss uncontested, Yorkshire elected to field first; No play possible on Day 1 due to rain.; Points: Somerset 20, Yorkshire 3.

27–30 April 2018	Worcestershire (H)	v	Nottinghamshire	Nottinghamshire won by an innings and 41 runs
Scorecard	110 (26.3 overs); Joe Clarke 42 (35); Luke Fletcher 5/27 (9 overs)		300/9d (70.5 overs); Ross Taylor 50 (78); Josh Tongue 4/81 (19.5 overs)	New Road, Worcester; Umpires: David Millns and Richard Illingworth
Scorecard	149 (38.2 overs); Tom Fell 37 (73); Jake Ball 5/59 (13 overs)			New Road, Worcester; Umpires: David Millns and Richard Illingworth
Toss uncontested, Nottinghamshire elected to field first.; No play possible on Days 1 and 2 due to rain.; Points: Nottinghamshire 22, Worcestershire 3.

==== May ====
4–6 May 2018	Yorkshire	v	Essex (H)	Yorkshire won by 91 runs
Scorecard	50 (18.4 overs); Gary Ballance 22 (41); Sam Cook 5/28 (9 overs)		142 (43.5 overs); Dan Lawrence 48 (77); Tim Bresnan 3/26 (7 overs)	County Ground, Chelmsford; Umpires: Richard Kettleborough and Steve O'Shaughnessy
Scorecard	329 (94.3 overs); Harry Brook 124 (187); Peter Siddle 4/65 (25 overs)		146 (53 overs); Ryan ten Doeschate 34 (61); Steven Patterson 6/40 (18 overs)	County Ground, Chelmsford; Umpires: Richard Kettleborough and Steve O'Shaughnessy
Yorkshire won the toss and elected to bat first.; Steven Patterson bowled his career-best first class figures; Points: Yorkshire 19, Essex 3.

4–7 May 2018	Somerset	v	Lancashire (H)	Match drawn
Scorecard	429 (121.2 overs); George Bartlett 110 (210); Matt Parkinson 3/80 (26.2 overs)		492 (144 overs); Dane Vilas 235* (363); Tom Abell 4/43 (10 overs)	Old Trafford, Manchester; Umpires: Nick Cook and Ben Debenham
Scorecard	269/8d (93 overs); Jack Leach 66 (131); Matt Parkinson 5/101 (31 overs)			Old Trafford, Manchester; Umpires: Nick Cook and Ben Debenham
Somerset won the toss and elected to bat first.; Points: Lancashire 11, Somerset 10.

4–7 May 2018	Nottinghamshire (H)	v	Hampshire	Nottinghamshire won by 203 runs
Scorecard	302 (69.3 overs); Samit Patel 73 (92); Fidel Edwards 4/84 (21 overs)		223 (86.1 overs); Hashim Amla 69 (122); Samit Patel 3/25 (17 overs)	Trent Bridge, Nottingham; Umpires: Rob Bailey and Peter Hartley
Scorecard	389/9d (85.3 overs); Steven Mullaney 130 (189); Fidel Edwards 3/60 (16.3 overs)		265 (108.5 overs); Hashim Amla 112 (203); Stuart Broad 3/57 (21 overs)	Trent Bridge, Nottingham; Umpires: Rob Bailey and Peter Hartley
Nottinghamshire won the toss and elected to bat first.; Points: Nottinghamshire 22, Hampshire 4.

4–7 May 2018	Surrey (H)	v	Worcestershire	Match drawn
Scorecard	434 (144.2 overs); Rory Burns 193 (408); Joe Leach 4/96 (36 overs)		526 (158.4 overs); Joe Clarke 157 (280); Amar Virdi 6/105 (41.4 overs)	Kensington Oval, London; Umpires: Alex Wharf and Jeff Evans
Scorecard	173/3d (60 overs); Scott Borthwick 82* (154); Charles Morris 2/21 (6 overs)			Kensington Oval, London; Umpires: Alex Wharf and Jeff Evans
Surrey won the toss and elected to bat; Ben Twohig (Worcestershire) made his first-class debut.; Points: Worcestershire 11, Surrey 9.

11–13 May 2018	Nottinghamshire (H)	v	Lancashire	Lancashire won by an innings and 67 runs
Scorecard	133 (47.1 overs); Jake Libby 34 (85); Graham Onions 3/22 (11 overs)		338 (86 overs); Keaton Jennings 126 (247); Stuart Broad 4/41 (20 overs)	Trent Bridge, Nottingham; Umpires: Tim Robinson and Michael Gough
Scorecard	138 (52.4 overs); Jake Libby 46 (144); Graham Onions 6/55 (17.4 overs)			Trent Bridge, Nottingham; Umpires: Tim Robinson and Michael Gough
Toss uncontested, Lancashire elected to field first.; Points: Lancashire 22, Nottinghamshire 3.

11–14 May 2018	Somerset (H)	v	Hampshire	Match drawn
Scorecard	231 (66.3 overs); James Vince 44 (43); Tom Abell 3/36 (11 overs)		506 (113.1 overs); James Hildreth 184 (253); Gareth Berg 5/130 (34.1 overs)	Cooper Associates County Ground, Taunton; Umpires: Jeff Evans and Jeremy Lloyds
Scorecard	432/4d (150 overs); James Vince 201* (437); Lewis Gregory 2/60 (22 overs)			Cooper Associates County Ground, Taunton; Umpires: Jeff Evans and Jeremy Lloyds
Somerset won the toss and elected to field.; Points: Somerset 13, Hampshire 9.

11–14 May 2018	Surrey (H)	v	Yorkshire	Surrey won by an innings and 17 runs
Scorecard	414 (101.1 overs); Ollie Pope 158* (224); Tim Bresnan 3/98 (26.1 overs)		229 (57.2 overs); Jonny Bairstow 95 (94); Sam Curran 6/54 (16.2 overs)	Kensington Oval, London; Umpires: David Millns and Martin Saggers
Scorecard			168 (66.1 overs) (f/o); Adam Lyth 58 (130); Sam Curran 4/47 (17 overs)	Kensington Oval, London; Umpires: David Millns and Martin Saggers
Toss uncontested, Yorkshire elected to field first.; Points: Surrey 24, Yorkshire 4.

11–13 May 2018	Essex	v	Worcestershire (H)	Essex won by 32 runs
Scorecard	177 (65.1 overs); Alastair Cook 37 (97); Josh Tongue 4/45 (15 overs)		238 (72.4 overs); Joe Clarke 105 (168); Ravi Bopara 3/30 (6.4 overs)	New Road, Worcester; Umpires: Neil Mallender and Nick Cook
Scorecard	275 (82.5 overs); Dan Lawrence 71 (135); Josh Tongue 5/53 (23.5 overs)		182 (60.1 overs); Travis Head 62 (118); Peter Siddle 5/37 (18 overs)	New Road, Worcester; Umpires: Neil Mallender and Nick Cook
Essex won the toss and elected to bat first.; Points: Essex 19, Worcestershire 4.

==== June ====
9–11 June 2018	Surrey	v	Hampshire (H)	Surrey won by an innings and 58 runs
Scorecard	368 (97 overs); Rory Burns 151 (204); Fidel Edwards 5/93 (26 overs)		135 (49.2 overs); Rilee Rossouw 46 (60); Rikki Clarke 5/29 (11.2 overs)	Rose Bowl, Southampton; Umpires: Billy Taylor and Neil Mallender
Scorecard			175 (58.4 overs) (f/o); Joe Weatherley 50 (!26); Amar Virdi 3/23 (9 overs)	Rose Bowl, Southampton; Umpires: Billy Taylor and Neil Mallender
Surrey won the toss and chose to bat first.; Points: Surrey 23, Hampshire 3.

9–11 June 2018	Lancashire (H)	v	Essex	Essex won by 5 wickets
Scorecard	301 (98.2 overs); Shivnarine Chanderpaul 58 (181); Simon Harmer 3/35 (22.2 overs)		302 (84.1 overs); Alastair Cook 58 (102); Tom Bailey 4/54 (20.1 overs)	Old Trafford, Manchester; Umpires: Steve O'Shaughnessy and Jeremy Lloyds
Scorecard	105 (32.4 overs); Joe Mennie 32* (61); Jamie Porter 5/30 (12.4 overs)		108/5 (28.5 overs); Ravi Bopara 36* (69); Graham Onions 3/29 (7 overs)	Old Trafford, Manchester; Umpires: Steve O'Shaughnessy and Jeremy Lloyds
Toss uncontested, Essex elected to field first.; Points: Essex 22, Lancashire 6.

9–12 June 2018	Somerset (H)	v	Nottinghamshire	Somerset won by 6 wickets
Scorecard	392 (122.4 overs); Matt Renshaw 106 (171); Matthew Carter 5/113 (37 overs)		134 (37.1 overs); Ross Taylor 74 (89); Craig Overton 4/53 (12.1 overs)	County Ground, Taunton; Umpires: Neil Bainton and Richard Illingworth
Scorecard	250/4 (67.2 overs); Matt Renshaw 61 (132); Matthew Carter 3/82 (21 overs)		505 (146.1 overs) (f/o); Tom Moores 103 (117); Josh Davey 4/76 (22.1 overs)	County Ground, Taunton; Umpires: Neil Bainton and Richard Illingworth
Somerset won the toss and chose to bat first.; Points: Somerset 22, Nottinghamshire 2.

20–23 June 2018	Nottinghamshire	v	Essex (H)	Nottinghamshire won by 301 runs
Scorecard	380 (115.1 overs); Ross Taylor 146 (208); Simon Harmer 4/78 (32.1 overs)		206 (59.3 overs); Ravi Bopara 69 (89); Matthew Carter 4/34 (15.3 overs)	County Ground, Chelmsford; Umpires: Nigel Llong and Billy Taylor
Scorecard	266 (72.1 overs); Tom Moores 87 (80); Matthew Quinn 3/23 (12 overs)		139 (58.5 overs); Ravi Bopara 39 (62); Matt Milnes 4/44 (20 overs)	County Ground, Chelmsford; Umpires: Nigel Llong and Billy Taylor
Nottinghamshire won the toss and elected to bat first.; Points: Nottinghamshire 23, Essex 3.

20–22 June 2018	Surrey (H)	v	Somerset	Surrey won by an innings and 69 runs
Scorecard	459 (120.1 overs); Ollie Pope 117 (134); Tim Groenewald 4/85 (26 overs)		180 (59.5 overs); Eddie Byrom 52 (144); Ryan Patel 6/5 (3.5 overs)	The Oval, London; Umpires: Nick Cook and Ian Blackwell
Scorecard			210 (61.2 overs) (f/o); James Hildreth 89* (127); Morné Morkel 4/36 (15.2 overs)	The Oval, London; Umpires: Nick Cook and Ian Blackwell
Toss uncontested, Somerset elected to field first.; Will Jacks (Surrey) made his first-class debut.; Points: Surrey 24, Somerset 2.

20–23 June 2018	Worcestershire (H)	v	Lancashire	Worcestershire won by 202 runs
Scorecard	247 (63.5 overs); Daryl Mitchell 118 (185); Joe Mennie 4/43 (12 overs)		130 (46.4 overs); Keaton Jennings 55 (130); Ed Barnard 5/34 (16 overs)	New Road, Worcester; Umpires: Ben Debenham and Peter Hartley
Scorecard	484/7d (96 overs); Daryl Mitchell 163 (221); Jordan Clark 3/96 (18 overs)		399 (122.4 overs); Keaton Jennings 177 (295); Ed Barnard 4/95 (30.4 overs)	New Road, Worcester; Umpires: Ben Debenham and Peter Hartley
Toss uncontested, Lancashire elected to field first.; Danny Lamb (Lancashire) made his first-class debut.; Points: Worcestershire 20, Lancashire 3.

20–23 June 2018 (D/N)	Yorkshire	v	Hampshire (H)	Match drawn
Scorecard	350 (104.2 overs); Gary Ballance 109 (186); Dale Steyn 5/66 (29 overs)		443 (144.4 overs); James Adams 147 (320); Jack Brooks 5/124 (30.4 overs)	Rose Bowl, Southampton; Umpires: Jeremy Lloyds and Russell Warren
Scorecard	263/6d (113 overs); Harry Brook 68 (101); Ollie Rayner 4/54 (33 overs)			Rose Bowl, Southampton; Umpires: Jeremy Lloyds and Russell Warren
Yorkshire won the toss and elected to bat first.; Jonny Tattersall (Yorkshire) made his first-class debut.; Points: Hampshire 11, Yorkshire 10.

25–28 June 2018	Yorkshire (H)	v	Surrey	Surrey won by 7 wickets
Scorecard	342 (102.5 overs); Jonny Tattersall 70 (156); Jade Dernbach 4/104 (24.5 overs)		267 (83.2 overs); Ollie Pope 69* (118); Ben Coad 5/53 (20.2 overs)	North Marine Road Ground, Scarborough; Umpires: Peter Hartley and Paul Pollard
Scorecard	152 (63.4 overs); Steven Patterson 25* (57); Morne Morkel 5/39 (16 overs)		229/3 (66.1 overs); Rory Burns 97 (146); Jack Leaning 1/16 (8 overs)	North Marine Road Ground, Scarborough; Umpires: Peter Hartley and Paul Pollard
Yorkshire won the toss and elected to bat first.; Points: Surrey 21, Yorkshire 6.

25–28 June 2018	Hampshire	v	Lancashire (H)	Match drawn
Scorecard	451 (142.3 overs); Rilee Rossouw 120* (189); Graham Onions 5/96 (31 overs)		411 (118.5 overs); Dane Vilas 134 (216); Kyle Abbott 3/89 (19.5 overs)	Old Trafford, Manchester; Umpires: Nigel Llong and Paul Baldwin
Scorecard	237/5d (97 overs); Joe Weatherley 126* (260); Jordan Clark 2/18 (14 overs)			Old Trafford, Manchester; Umpires: Nigel Llong and Paul Baldwin
Hampshire won the toss and elected to bat first.; Points: Lancashire 11, Hampshire 10.

25–28 June 2018 (D/N)	Essex (H)	v	Somerset	Match drawn
Scorecard	517/5d (150 overs); Ryan ten Doeschate 173* (244); Dominic Bess 2/132 (49 overs)		407 (127 overs); James Hildreth 78 (148); Neil Wagner 3/122 (32 overs)	County Ground, Chelmsford; Umpires: Russell Warren and Martin Saggers
Scorecard	208/7d (53 overs); Nick Browne 75 (156); Dominic Bess 3/81 (17 overs)		151/5 (49 overs); Eddie Byrom 38 (37); Simon Harmer 3/44 (22 overs)	County Ground, Chelmsford; Umpires: Russell Warren and Martin Saggers
Essex won the toss and elected to bat first.; Michael-Kyle Pepper (Essex) made his first-class debut.; Points: Essex 11, Somerset 10.

25–28 June 2018 (D/N)	Nottinghamshire (H)	v	Worcestershire	Match drawn
Scorecard	499/9d (135 overs); Chris Nash 139 (225); Steve Magoffin 3/70 (25 overs)		287 (74 overs); Ross Whiteley 76 (71); Harry Gurney 4/97 (23 overs)	Trent Bridge, Nottingham; Umpires: Jeremy Lloyds and Ian Blackwell
Scorecard	249/4d (55.2 overs); Jake Libby 100* (144); Dillon Pennington 2/51 (8 overs)		368/8 (114.5 overs); Joe Clarke 177* (214); Luke Fletcher 3/54 (20.5 overs)	Trent Bridge, Nottingham; Umpires: Jeremy Lloyds and Ian Blackwell
Toss uncontested, Worcestershire elected to field first; Dillon Pennington (Worcestershire) made his first-class debut.; Points: Nottinghamshire 12, Worcestershire 9.

==== July ====
22–24 July 2018	Yorkshire	v	Lancashire (H)	Yorkshire won by 118 runs
Scorecard	192 (57.1 overs); Adam Lyth 70 (119); Jordan Clark 5/58 (12.1 overs)		109 (30.4 overs); Alex Davies 51 (77); Ben Coad 3/28 (9 overs)	Old Trafford, Manchester; Umpires: Alex Wharf and Paul Pollard
Scorecard	239 (51.3 overs); Jonny Bairstow 82 (67); Graham Onions 3/44 (12 overs)		204 (60.4 overs); Jos Butler 59 (69); Joe Root 4/5 (7.4 overs)	Old Trafford, Manchester; Umpires: Alex Wharf and Paul Pollard
Yorkshire won the toss and elected to bat first.; Points: Yorkshire 19, Lancashire 2.

22–24 July 2018	Nottinghamshire (H)	v	Surrey	Surrey won by an innings and 183 runs
Scorecard	210 (54 overs); Harry Gurney 29* (22); Morné Morkel 4/60 (14 overs)		592 (119.3 overs); Rory Burns 153 (248); Billy Root 3/37 (4.3 overs)	Trent Bridge, Nottingham; Umpires: David Millns and Russell Warren
Scorecard	199 (47.5 overs); Samit Patel 55 (49); Morné Morkel 5/60 (13.5 overs)			Trent Bridge, Nottingham; Umpires: David Millns and Russell Warren
Toss uncontested, Surrey elected to field first.; Points: Surrey 24, Nottinghamshire 3.

22–25 July 2018	Somerset	v	Worcestershire (H)	Somerset won by 141 runs
Scorecard	337 (101.3 overs); Steven Davies 72 (95); Moeen Ali 3/63 (22 overs)		257 (63.5 overs); Luke Wood 65 (77); Jamie Overton 4/61 (15 overs)	New Road, Worcester; Umpires: Rob Bailey and Paul Baldwin
Scorecard	362/9d (100.5 overs); Azhar Ali 125 (188); Moeen Ali 5/107 (33.5 overs)		301 (87 overs); Alex Milton 104* (42); Jamie Overton 4/82 (19 overs)	New Road, Worcester; Umpires: Rob Bailey and Paul Baldwin
Worcestershire won the toss and elected to field; Points: Somerset 22, Worcestershire 5.

==== August ====
19–22 August 2018	Hampshire (H)	v	Nottinghamshire	Hampshire won by 270 runs
Scorecard	277 (74.5 overs); James Vince 74 (96); Matthew Carter 3/43 (10.5 overs)		166 (44.1 overs); Luke Fletcher 43 (35); Fidel Edwards 6/50 (16 overs)	Rose Bowl, Southampton; Umpires: Ian Blackwell and Russell Warren
Scorecard	399/7d (104 overs); James Vince 147 (195); Mark Footitt 3/69 (15 overs)		240 (93.4 overs); Riki Wessels 69 (134); Kyle Abbott 4/36 (22 overs)	Rose Bowl, Southampton; Umpires: Ian Blackwell and Russell Warren
Toss uncontested, Nottinghamshire elected to field first.; Points: Hampshire 21, Nottinghamshire 3.

19–22 August 2018	Somerset (H)	v	Essex	Somerset won by 45 runs
Scorecard	324 (100.3 overs); Marcus Trescothick 95 (158); Peter Siddle 5/80 (26 overs)		191 (66.4 overs); Ryan ten Doeschate 73 (137); Jamie Overton 3/40 (8.4 overs)	County Ground, Taunton; Umpires: David Millns and Ben Debenham
Scorecard	202 (66.3 overs); Eddie Byrom 42 (113); Simon Harmer 4/69 (25 overs)		290 (106 overs); Nick Browne 86 (181); Jack Leach 8/85 (48 overs)	County Ground, Taunton; Umpires: David Millns and Ben Debenham
Somerset won the toss and elected to bat first.; Points: Somerset 22, Essex 3.

19–22 August 2018	Yorkshire (H)	v	Worcestershire	Worcestershire won by an innings and 186 runs
Scorecard	216 (61.4 overs); Kane Williamson 87 (131); Dillon Pennington 4/53 (16 overs)		572/7d (139.2 overs); Moeen Ali 219 (277); Josh Poysden 3/128 (25.2 overs)	North Marine Road Ground, Scarborough; Umpires: Tim Robinson and Neil Mallender
Scorecard	170 (62.1 overs); Kane Williamson 61 (95); Moeen Ali 6/49 (23 overs)			North Marine Road Ground, Scarborough; Umpires: Tim Robinson and Neil Mallender
Toss uncontested, Worcestershire elected to field first.; Points: Worcestershire 24, Yorkshire 1.

19–22 August 2018 (D/N)	Surrey (H)	v	Lancashire	Surrey won by 6 runs
Scorecard	211 (52.2 overs); Aaron Finch 43 (63); Tom Bailey 5/53 (15.2 overs)		247 (79.2 overs); Dane Vilas 61 (88); Morné Morkel 2/42 (16 overs)	Kensington Oval, London; Umpires: Mike Burns and Michael Gough
Scorecard	306 (91.5 overs); Rory Burns 70 (139); Graham Onions 3/91 (24 overs)		264 (93.1 overs); Rob Jones 48 (89); Morné Morkel 6/57 (21.1 overs)	Kensington Oval, London; Umpires: Mike Burns and Michael Gough
Josh Bohannon (Lancashire) made his first-class debut.; Points: Surrey 20, Lancashire 4.

29 August – 1 September 2018	Essex (H)	v	Hampshire	Essex won by an innings and 52 runs
Scorecard	435 (114.1 overs); Dan Lawrence 124 (210); Kyle Abbott 5/90 (28 overs)		172 (78.3 overs); Joe Weatherley 32 (59); Sam Cook 3/27 (10.3 overs)	County Ground, Chelmsford; Umpires: Mike Burns and Rob Bailey
Scorecard			211 (90.3 overs) (f/o); Tom Alsop 51 (142); Peter Siddle 5/48 (22 overs)	County Ground, Chelmsford; Umpires: Mike Burns and Rob Bailey
Essex won the toss and elected to bat first.; No play possible on Day 1 due to rain and wet outfield.; Points: Essex 24, Hampshire 2.

29–31 August 2018	Worcestershire	v	Lancashire (H)	Lancashire won by 4 wickets
Scorecard	222 (70.1 overs); Brett D'Oliveira 65 (120); Tom Bailey 4/41 (17 overs)		161 (37.5 overs); Alex Davies 47 (64); Josh Tongue 5/63 (15.5 overs)	Trafalgar Road Ground, Southport; Umpires: Michael Gough and David Millns
Scorecard	252 (73.1 overs); Wayne Parnell 50 (76); Tom Bailey 3/53 (16 overs)		317/6 (3 overs); Dane Vilas 107* (190); Ed Barnard 2/50 (20 overs)	Trafalgar Road Ground, Southport; Umpires: Michael Gough and David Millns
Worcestershire won the toss and chose to bat first.; Points: Lancashire 19, Worcestershire 4.

29–31 August 2018	Surrey (H)	v	Nottinghamshire	Surrey won by an innings and 125 runs
Scorecard	375 (107.3 overs); Mark Stoneman 144 (260); Luke Wood 3/66 (22 overs)		101 (31.4 overs); Tom Moores 29 (59); Tom Curran 5/28 (8.4 overs)	Kensington Oval, London; Umpires: Tim Robinson and Steve O'Shaughnessy
Scorecard			149 (61 overs) (f/o); Kraigg Brathwaite 60 (149); Conor McKerr 4/26 (12 overs)	Kensington Oval, London; Umpires: Tim Robinson and Steve O'Shaughnessy
Toss uncontested, Nottinghamshire elected to field first.; Points: Surrey 23, Nottinghamshire 3.

29 August – 1 September 2018	Somerset	v	Yorkshire (H)	Somerset won by 224 runs
Scorecard	399 (103.2 overs); Azhar Ali 89 (176); Jack Brooks 5/116 (29 overs)		320 (97.2 overs); Andrew Hodd 85 (156); Josh Davey 5/65 (23 overs)	Headingley, Leeds; Umpires: Peter Hartley and Graham Lloyd
Scorecard	339/7d (70.1 overs); Tom Abell 132* (168); David Willey 3/72 (17 overs)		194 (78.3 overs); Kane Williamson 51 (107); Jamie Overton 4/25 (14.3 overs)	Headingley, Leeds; Umpires: Peter Hartley and Graham Lloyd
Yorkshire won the toss and chose to field first.; Points: Somerset 23, Yorkshire 6.

==== September ====
4–6 September 2018	Surrey	v	Essex (H)	Surrey won by 10 wickets
Scorecard	351 (119.2 overs); Rory Burns 90 (217); Sam Cook 3/71 (25 overs)		126 (37.2 overs); Tom Westley 49 (66); Rikki Clarke 4/28 (9 overs)	County Ground, Chelmsford; Umpires: Jeff Evans and Nigel Llong
Scorecard	2/0 (0.4 overs); Rory Burns 2* (4)		226 (70.3 overs) (f/o); Ravi Bopara 81* (122); Rikki Clarke 4/47 (17 overs)	County Ground, Chelmsford; Umpires: Jeff Evans and Nigel Llong
Essex won the toss and elected to field first.; Points: Surrey 22, Essex 2.

4–7 September 2018	Nottinghamshire (H)	v	Yorkshire	Match drawn
Scorecard	448 (117.3 overs); Ben Slater 109 (184); Matthew Waite 3/91 (23 overs)		498 (147.2 overs); Tom Kohler-Cadmore 106 (232); Samit Patel 6/114 (47 overs)	Trent Bridge, Nottingham; Umpires: Steve O'Shaughnessy and Rob Bailey
Scorecard	93/1d (31 overs); Kraigg Brathwaite 42* (102); Josh Poysden 1/34 (10 overs)			Trent Bridge, Nottingham; Umpires: Steve O'Shaughnessy and Rob Bailey
Toss uncontested, Yorkshire elected to field first.; Points: Nottinghamshire 12, Yorkshire 12.

4–5 September 2018	Lancashire	v	Somerset (H)	Match tied
Scorecard	99 (39.1 overs); Alex Davies 20 (53); Jack Leach 5/28 (12.1 overs)		192 (46 overs); Lewis Gregory 64* (73); Keshav Maharaj 4/63 (19 overs)	County Ground, Taunton; Umpires: Jeremy Lloyds and Paul Baldwin
Scorecard	170 (52.5 overs); Steven Croft 51 (110); Jack Leach 7/74 (26.5 overs)		77 (26.4 overs); Dominic Bess 19 (36); Keshav Maharaj 7/37 (13.4 overs)	County Ground, Taunton; Umpires: Jeremy Lloyds and Paul Baldwin
Lancashire won the toss and elected to bat first.; Ben Green (Somerset) made his first-class debut.; Points: Somerset 11, Lancashire 11.

4–6 September 2018	Hampshire	v	Worcestershire (H)	Hampshire won by 114 runs
Scorecard	191 (57.3 overs); Sam Northeast 48 (69); Ed Barnard 6/50 (16 overs)		120 (41 overs); Daryl Mitchell 41 (66); Dale Steyn 3/25 (12 overs)	New Road, Worcester; Umpires: Richard Kettleborough and Nick Cook
Scorecard	176 (53.1 overs); Tom Alsop 64 (117); Wayne Parnell 4/23 (9.1 overs)		133 (41.5 overs); Ross Whiteley 37* (49); Kyle Abbott 6/39 (14 overs)	New Road, Worcester; Umpires: Richard Kettleborough and Nick Cook
Hampshire won the toss and elected to bat first.; Points: Hampshire 19, Worcestershire 3.

10–11 September 2018	Somerset	v	Hampshire (H)	Hampshire won by 6 wickets
Scorecard	106 (37 overs); Ben Green 26 (60); Kyle Abbott 5/31 (10 overs)		148 (58.4 overs); Sam Northeast 53 (127); Jamie Overton 4/23 (13.4 overs)	Rose Bowl, Southampton; Umpires: Steve O'Shaughnessy and Alex Wharf
Scorecard	116 (37 overs); Marcus Trescothick 50 (124); Kyle Abbott 6/40 (13 overs)		75/4 (22.5 overs); James Adams 25* (46); Craig Overton 3/22 (8 overs)	Rose Bowl, Southampton; Umpires: Steve O'Shaughnessy and Alex Wharf
Somerset won the toss and elected to bat first.; Points: Hampshire 19, Somerset 3.

10–13 September 2018	Nottinghamshire (H)	v	Essex	Essex won by 8 wickets
Scorecard	177 (58.1 overs); Ben Slater 33 (70); Jamie Porter 4/50 (15.1 overs)		233 (66.1 overs); Murali Vijay 56 (95); Steven Mullaney 4/68 (22 overs)	Trent Bridge, Nottingham; Umpires: Tom Lungley and Nick Cook
Scorecard	337 (103 overs); Kraigg Brathwaite 68 (149); Simon Harmer 6/87 (29 overs)		282/2 (69.4 overs); Tom Westley 110* (198); Mark Footitt 1/49 (8.4 overs)	Trent Bridge, Nottingham; Umpires: Tom Lungley and Nick Cook
Nottinghamshire won the toss and elected to bat first.; Lyndon James (Nottinghamshire) made his first-class debut.; Points: Essex 20, Nottinghamshire 3.

10–13 September 2018	Worcestershire (H)	v	Surrey	Surrey won by 3 wickets
Scorecard	336 (116.4 overs); Ross Whiteley 91 (142); Tom Curran 4/61 (32 overs)		268 (71.3 overs); Rory Burns 122 (206); Wayne Parnell 3/56 (18 overs)	New Road, Worcester; Umpires: Neil Mallender and Mike Burns
Scorecard	203 (63.5 overs); Tom Fell 89 (134); Morné Morkel 5/24 (17 overs)		274/7 (71.2 overs); Rory Burns 66 (126); Dillon Pennington 3/41 (12.2 overs)	New Road, Worcester; Umpires: Neil Mallender and Mike Burns
Worcestershire won the toss and elected to bat first.; Olly Westbury (Worcestershire) made his first-class debut.; Points: Surrey 21, Worcestershire 6.

10–13 September 2018	Yorkshire (H)	v	Lancashire	Yorkshire won by 95 runs
Scorecard	209 (60.4 overs); Tom Kohler-Cadmore 105* (130); Graham Onions 4/76 (21 overs)		252 (84.2 overs); Alex Davies 87 (165); Jack Brooks 5/66 (17 overs)	Headingley, Leeds; Umpires: David Millns and Rob Bailey
Scorecard	272 (101.2 overs); Gary Ballance 85 (172); Tom Bailey 4/69 (29 overs)		134 (48.1 overs); Liam Livingstone 28 (56); Ben Coad 5/24 (15.1 overs)	Headingley, Leeds; Umpires: David Millns and Rob Bailey
Toss uncontested, Lancashire elected to field first.; Points: Yorkshire 20, Lancashire 5.

18–20 September 2018	Worcestershire	v	Essex (H)	Essex won by an innings and 129 runs
Scorecard	94 (25.3 overs); Joe Clarke 28 (56); Jamie Porter 7/41 (10 overs)		474/7d (124 overs); Ravi Bopara 133* (272); Ed Barnard 3/63 (24 overs)	County Ground, Chelmsford; Umpires: Billy Taylor and Ian Gould
Scorecard	251 (77.5 overs); Joe Clarke 74 (117); Jamie Porter 4/57 (18 overs)			County Ground, Chelmsford; Umpires: Billy Taylor and Ian Gould
Worcestershire won the toss and elected to bat first.; Points: Essex 24, Worcestershire 2.

18–21 September 2018	Surrey	v	Somerset (H)	Match drawn
Scorecard	485 (125.1 overs); Dean Elgar 110 (185); Tom Abell 3/52 (13.1 overs)		146 (44.2 overs); Josh Davey 36 (74); Morné Morkel 3/19 (8.2 overs)	County Ground, Taunton; Umpires: Tim Robinson and Alex Wharf
Scorecard			168/3 (42.2 overs) (f/o); Azhar Ali 61* (114); Tom Curran 2/44 (9 overs)	County Ground, Taunton; Umpires: Tim Robinson and Alex Wharf
Surrey won the toss and elected to bat first.; No play possible on Day-4 due to rain and wet outfield.; Tom Banton (Somerset) made his first-class debut.; Points: Surrey 13, Somerset 6.

18–21 September 2018	Yorkshire (H)	v	Hampshire	Match drawn
Scorecard	184 (52.1 overs); Gary Ballance 30 (42); Fidel Edwards 4/83 (16 overs)		157 (66.4 overs); James Vince 25 (45); Tim Bresnan 5/28 (13 overs)	Headingley, Leeds; Umpires: Graham Lloyd and Michael Gough
Scorecard	287/5 (80 overs); Adam Lyth 134* (219); Liam Dawson 3/85 (25 overs)			Headingley, Leeds; Umpires: Graham Lloyd and Michael Gough
Toss uncontested, Hampshire elected to field first.; No play possible on Day-4 due to rain and wet outfield.; Points: Yorkshire 8, Hampshire 8.

24–26 September 2018	Hampshire (H)	v	Lancashire	Lancashire won by 8 wickets
Scorecard	187 (56.4 overs); Sam Northeast 42 (87); Tom Bailey 4/57 (18.5 overs)		273 (82.4 overs); Rob Jones 68 (95); Fidel Edwards 4/72 (15.4 overs)	Rose Bowl, Southampton; Umpires: Ian Gould and Rob Bailey
Scorecard	198 (57 overs); Lewis McManus 44* (90); Tom Bailey 4/43 (19 overs)		113/2 (13 overs); Liam Livingstone 48* (30); Fidel Edwards 2/23 (4 overs)	Rose Bowl, Southampton; Umpires: Ian Gould and Rob Bailey
Toss uncontested, Lancashire elected to field first.; Brooke Guest (Lancashire) made his first-class debut.; Points: Lancashire 21, Hampshire 3.

24–26 September 2018	Somerset	v	Nottinghamshire (H)	Somerset won by an innings and 146 runs
Scorecard	463 (115.5 overs); James Hildreth 137 (203); Harry Gurney 6/106 (30 overs)		133 (35.3 overs); Luke Wood 35* (35); Craig Overton 4/27 (9 overs)	Trent Bridge, Nottingham; Umpires: Richard Kettleborough and Nick Cook
Scorecard			184 (64.2 overs) (f/o); Steven Mullaney 54 (92); Josh Davey 3/20 (11.2 overs)	Trent Bridge, Nottingham; Umpires: Richard Kettleborough and Nick Cook
Somerset won the toss and elected to bat first.; Points: Somerset 24, Nottinghamshire 2.

24–27 September 2018	Surrey (H)	v	Essex	Essex won by 1 wicket
Scorecard	67 (27 overs); Ollie Pope 26 (53); Jamie Porter 4/26 (10 overs)		477/8d (140.2 overs); Tom Westley 134 (282); Jade Dernbach 4/95 (29.2 overs)	The Oval, London; Umpires: Martin Saggers and Alex Wharf
Scorecard	541 (142.2 overs); Jason Roy 128 (151); Matt Coles 5/123 (32 overs)		134/9 (32.2 overs); Ryan ten Doeschate 53* (62); Morné Morkel 4/28 (12 overs)	The Oval, London; Umpires: Martin Saggers and Alex Wharf
Surrey won the toss and elected to bat first.; Points: Essex 22, Surrey 2.

24–26 September 2018	Worcestershire (H)	v	Yorkshire	Yorkshire won by 7 wickets
Scorecard	340 (102 overs); Daryl Mitchell 127 (252); Jack Brooks 6/94 (22 overs)		428 (90.5 overs); Gary Ballance 194 (222); Josh Tongue 3/31 (14 overs)	New Road, Worcester; Umpires: Richard Illingworth and Russell Warren
Scorecard	221 (50 overs); Moeen Ali 67 (74); Ben Coad 4/56 (11 overs)		137/3 (30.1 overs); Gary Ballance 60 (63); Dillon Pennington 1/31 (7 overs)	New Road, Worcester; Umpires: Richard Illingworth and Russell Warren
Toss uncontested, Yorkshire elected to field first.; James Logan (Yorkshire) made his first-class debut.; Points: Yorkshire 24, Worcestershire 6.

=== Division Two ===
==== April ====
13–15 April 2018	Middlesex (H)	v	Northamptonshire	Middlesex won by 160 runs
Scorecard	214 (80.2 overs); James Harris 46 (91); Brett Hutton 5/54 (20.2 overs)		71 (21.2 overs); Richard Levi 20 (25); James Harris 5/9 (5.2 overs)	Lord's, London; Umpires: Tim Robinson and Paul Baldwin
Scorecard	159 (38.3 overs); Max Holden 33 (33); Doug Bracewell 3/31 (9 overs)		142 (38.2 overs); Rob Newton 44 (67); Tim Murtagh 4/36 (11.2 overs)	Lord's, London; Umpires: Tim Robinson and Paul Baldwin
Toss uncontested, Northamptonshire elected to field first; Points: Middlesex 20, Northamptonshire 3.

13–16 April 2018	Kent (H)	v	Gloucestershire	Gloucestershire won by 5 wickets
Scorecard	64 (18.5 overs); Zak Crawley 15 (26); Matt Taylor 4/20 (6 overs)		110 (39 overs); Gareth Roderick 51 (102); Matt Henry 4/33 (14 overs)	St Lawrence Ground, Canterbury; Umpires: Neil Bainton and Mike Burns
Scorecard	153 (48.3 overs); Daniel Bell-Drummond 61 (63); Ryan Higgins 5/22 (14 overs)		108/5 (28.3 overs); Benny Howell 52* (90); Matt Henry 3/37 (14 overs)	St Lawrence Ground, Canterbury; Umpires: Neil Bainton and Mike Burns
Toss uncontested, Gloucestershire elected to field first; No play possible on Day 1 due to rain.; Points: Gloucestershire 19, Kent 3.

13–16 April 2018	Warwickshire (H)	v	Sussex	Match drawn
Scorecard	299 (86.2 overs); Tim Ambrose 81 (116); David Wiese 4/56 (21 overs)		374 (88.5 overs); David Wiese 106 (105); Olly Stone 8/80 (22.5 overs)	Edgbaston, Birmingham; Umpires: Steve O'Shaughnessy and Paul Pollard
Scorecard	87/3 (35 overs); Dominic Sibley 42* (89); Ishant Sharma 2/16 (9 overs)			Edgbaston, Birmingham; Umpires: Steve O'Shaughnessy and Paul Pollard
Toss uncontested, Sussex elected to field first; No play possible on Day 1 due to rain.; Points: Sussex 12, Warwickshire 10.

20–22 April 2018	Northamptonshire (H)	v	Warwickshire	Warwickshire won by an innings and 48 runs
Scorecard	147 (48.4 overs); Richard Levi 41 (76); Ryan Sidebottom 6/35 (12.4 overs)		413 (128.1 overs); Tim Ambrose 103 (155); Ben Sanderson 3/62 (29 overs)	County Ground, Northampton; Umpires: Richard Kettleborough and Russell Warren
Scorecard	218 (91.2 overs); Adam Rossington 58 (143); Ryan Sidebottom 4/61 (22 overs)			County Ground, Northampton; Umpires: Richard Kettleborough and Russell Warren
Northamptonshire won the toss and elected to bat; Points: Warwickshire 22, Northamptonshire 3.

20–23 April 2018	Derbyshire (H)	v	Middlesex	Derbyshire won by 101 runs
Scorecard	265 (67 overs); Hardus Viljoen 60* (71); James Harris 4/68 (19 overs)		157 (57.1 overs); John Simpson 32 (34); Duanne Olivier 4/26 (13.1 overs)	County Ground, Derby; Umpires: Martin Saggers and Ian Blackwell
Scorecard	333/3d (110 overs); Luis Reece 157* (352); Paul Stirling 2/62 (20 overs)		340 (111.3 overs); James Harris 64* (188); Duanne Olivier 4/82 (23.3 overs)	County Ground, Derby; Umpires: Martin Saggers and Ian Blackwell
Toss uncontested, Middlesex elected to field first; Points: Derbyshire 21, Middlesex 3.

20–23 April 2018	Gloucestershire (H)	v	Glamorgan	Glamorgan won by 6 wickets
Scorecard	236 (85.4 overs); Kieran Noema-Barnett 46 (125); Marchant de Lange 5/62 (20.4 overs)		526/9d (153 overs); David Lloyd 119 (157); Ryan Higgins 3/102 (30 overs)	County Ground, Bristol; Umpires: Jeff Evans and Paul Pollard
Scorecard	372 (118 overs); James Bracey 120* (328); Lukas Carey 4/105 (28 overs)		85/4 (12.5 overs); Nick Selman 36 (39); Matt Taylor 3/25 (6 overs)	County Ground, Bristol; Umpires: Jeff Evans and Paul Pollard
Toss uncontested, Glamorgan elected to field first; Points: Glamorgan 22, Gloucestershire 2.

20–23 April 2018	Sussex	v	Leicestershire (H)	Match drawn
Scorecard	438/8d (143 overs); Michael Burgess 101 (147); Ben Raine 3/104 (32 overs)		422/9d (135 overs); Colin Ackermann 186 (350); Luke Wells 4/81 (27 overs)	Grace Road, Leicester; Umpires: Alex Wharf and Paul Baldwin
Scorecard	241/4d (83 overs); Luke Wells 102* (241); Ateeq Javid 1/30 (12 overs)			Grace Road, Leicester; Umpires: Alex Wharf and Paul Baldwin
Sussex won the toss and elected to bat; Points: Leicestershire 10, Sussex 9.

20–21 April 2018	Durham (H)	v	Kent	Kent won by 9 wickets
Scorecard	91 (30.4 overs); James Weighell 16 (16); Matt Henry 5/28 (11 overs)		169 (56.4 overs); Heino Kuhn 54 (127); James Weighell 3/29 (11.4 overs)	Riverside Ground, Chester-le-Street; Umpires: Tim Robinson and Ben Debenham
Scorecard	170 (43.1 overs); James Weighell 84 (89); Matt Henry 7/45 (14.1 overs)		95/1 (23.1 overs); Daniel Bell-Drummond 45* (64); Nathan Rimmington 1/28 (8 overs)	Riverside Ground, Chester-le-Street; Umpires: Tim Robinson and Ben Debenham
Toss uncontested, Kent elected to field first; Points: Kent 19, Durham 3.

27–30 April 2018	Middlesex (H)	v	Glamorgan	Match drawn
Scorecard	194 (42.1 overs); Stevie Eskinazi 94 (91); Michael Hogan 5/49 (13.1 overs)		38/4 (15.5 overs); Nick Selman 21 (54); Tim Murtagh 4/12 (8 overs)	Lord's, London; Umpires: Ian Gould and Rob Bailey
Toss uncontested, Glamorgan elected to field first.; No play possible on Days 2 and 4 due to rain.; Tom Barber (Middlesex) made his first-class debut.; Points: Glamorgan 8, Middlesex 6.

27–30 April 2018	Northamptonshire (H)	v	Durham	Match abandoned
Scorecard				County Ground, Northampton; Umpires: Nick Cook and Graham Lloyd
No toss.; No play possible on all days due to rain and wet outfield.; Points: Northamptonshire 5, Durham 5.

27–30 April 2018	Sussex (H)	v	Gloucestershire	Match drawn
Scorecard	145 (47 overs); Philip Salt 63 (73); Ryan Higgins 5/21 (10 overs)		183 (57.1 overs); Benny Howell 37 (39); David Wiese 5/48 (18 overs)	County Ground, Hove; Umpires: Martin Saggers and Russell Warren
Scorecard	204 (58.5 overs); Harry Finch 48 (118); Daniel Worrall 4/45 (18.5 overs)		108/6 (43.2 overs); Benny Howell 45 (68); Stiaan van Zyl 3/16 (11 overs)	County Ground, Hove; Umpires: Martin Saggers and Russell Warren
Toss uncontested, Gloucestershire elected to field first; No play possible on Day 4 due to rain.; Points: Sussex 8, Gloucestershire 8.

27–30 April 2018	Leicestershire (H)	v	Derbyshire	Match drawn
Scorecard	381 (96 overs); Paul Horton 66 (118 overs); Luis Reece 3/64 (16 overs)		215/8 (68 overs); Gary Wilson 64* (127); Gavin Griffiths 2/29 (11 overs)	Grace Road, Leicester; Umpires: Michael Gough and Jeff Evans
Toss uncontested, Derbyshire elected to field first.; No play possible on Days 1 and 2 due to rain.; Points: Leicestershire 11, Derbyshire 10.

==== May ====
3–6 May 2018	Derbyshire	v	Warwickshire (H)	Warwickshire won by 8 wickets
Scorecard	318 (81.5 overs); Wayne Madsen 144 (203); Henry Brookes 4/63 (15.5 overs)		439 (123.5 overs); Matthew Lamb 79 (155); Duanne Olivier 4/134 (34.5 overs)	Edgbaston, Birmingham; Umpires: Richard Illingworth and Neil Mallender
Scorecard	209 (67.2 overs); Ben Slater 67 (161); Jeetan Patel 6/76 (30.2 overs)		89/2 (23.1 overs); Jonathan Trott 35* (45); Duanne Olivier 1/28 (9 overs)	Edgbaston, Birmingham; Umpires: Richard Illingworth and Neil Mallender
Derbyshire won the toss and elected to bat first.; Points: Warwickshire 23, Derbyshire 5.

4–7 May 2018	Leicestershire	v	Durham (H)	Durham won by 46 runs
Scorecard	440 (150.4 overs); Mark Cosgrove 75 (135); Barry McCarthy 3/72 (29 overs)		184 (54.3 overs); Graham Clark 64 (166); Gavin Griffiths 4/34 (12.3 overs)	Riverside Ground, Chester-le-Street; Umpires: Paul Pollard and Neil Bainton
Scorecard	101 (29.5 overs); Michael Carberry 22 (43); James Weighell 7/32 (9.5 overs)		403 (129.4 overs) (f/o); Aiden Markram 94 (156); Gavin Griffiths 6/49 (21.4 overs)	Riverside Ground, Chester-le-Street; Umpires: Paul Pollard and Neil Bainton
Durham won the toss and elected to field first.; Points: Durham 18, Leicestershire 6.

4–6 May 2018	Glamorgan (H)	v	Kent	Kent won by 6 wickets
Scorecard	94 (46.4 overs); Jack Murphy 39* (135); Darren Stevens 6/26 (16 overs)		174 (50.5 overs); Joe Denly 43 (51); Timm van der Gugten 7/42 (19.5 overs)	Sophia Gardens, Cardiff; Umpires: Graham Lloyd and Billy Taylor
Scorecard	274 (86.3 overs); Shaun Marsh 76 (113); Matt Henry 4/59 (20.3 overs)		195/4 (48.5 overs); Heino Kuhn 69* (87); Marchant de Lange 2/50 (12 overs)	Sophia Gardens, Cardiff; Umpires: Graham Lloyd and Billy Taylor
Toss uncontested, Kent elected to field first.; Points: Kent 19, Glamorgan 3.

4–7 May 2018	Middlesex	v	Sussex (H)	Sussex won by 3 wickets
Scorecard	230 (73 overs); Max Holden 84* (135); Ollie Robinson 7/58 (21 overs)		323 (93.1 overs); Harry Finch 103 (201); James Harris 5/86 (24.1 overs)	County Ground, Hove; Umpires: Jonathan Blades and David Millns
Scorecard	322 (99.2 overs); Dawid Malan 119 (206); David Wiese 4/70 (23.2 overs)		232/7 (73.3 overs); Ben Brown 65 (92); James Harris 3/74 (19.3 overs)	County Ground, Hove; Umpires: Jonathan Blades and David Millns
Middlesex won the toss and elected to bat first.; Points: Sussex 22, Middlesex 4.

11–13 May 2018	Kent (H)	v	Sussex	Kent won by 58 runs
Scorecard	215 (74.1 overs); Heino Kuhn 60 (116); David Wiese 4/54 (21 overs)		181 (43.5 overs); Michael Burgess 54 (70); Matt Henry 4/69 (18 overs)	St Lawrence Ground, Canterbury; Umpires: Rob Bailey and Russell Warren
Scorecard	235 (62.4 overs); Matt Henry 55 (53); Ishant Sharma 4/52 (17 overs)		211 (58 overs); Ben Brown 48 (93); Matt Henry 6/53 (21 overs)	St Lawrence Ground, Canterbury; Umpires: Rob Bailey and Russell Warren
Toss uncontested, Sussex elected to field first.; Points: Kent 20, Sussex 3.

11–13 May 2018	Northamptonshire	v	Warwickshire (H)	Warwickshire won by 6 wickets
Scorecard	256 (60.5 overs); Steven Crook 92 (104); Henry Brookes 4/54 (14.5 overs)		265 (71 overs); Tim Ambrose 78 (97); Steven Crook 4/51 (12.2 overs)	Edgbaston, Birmingham; Umpires: Ian Blackwell and Neil Bainton
Scorecard	187 (48.5 overs); Ben Duckett 38 (34); Olly Stone 5/49 (15.5 overs)		180/4 (53.4 overs); Will Rhodes 100* (165); Ben Sanderson 3/33 (16 overs)	Edgbaston, Birmingham; Umpires: Ian Blackwell and Neil Bainton
Northamptonshire won the toss and elected to bat first.; Points: Warwickshire 21, Northamptonshire 5.

11–14 May 2018	Middlesex (H)	v	Gloucestershire	Match drawn
Scorecard	455/8d (122 overs); Nick Gubbins 99 (138); Daniel Worrall 3/73 (26 overs)		210 (72.5 overs); Chris Dent 66 (140); Hilton Cartwright 4/33 (11 overs)	Lord's, London; Umpires: Jonathan Blades and Steve O'Shaughnessy
Scorecard			326/4d (111 overs) (f/o); James Bracey 125* (271); James Harris 3/60 (25 overs)	Lord's, London; Umpires: Jonathan Blades and Steve O'Shaughnessy
Toss uncontested, Gloucestershire elected to field first.; Points: Middlesex 12, Gloucestershire 8.

11–14 May 2018	Derbyshire (H)	v	Durham	Match drawn
Scorecard	427 (128.2 overs); Wayne Madsen 85 (142); Cameron Steel 2/19 (6 overs)		520 (134.1 overs); Stuart Poynter 170 (206); Tony Palladino 4/87 (28.1 overs)	County Ground, Derby; Umpires: Richard Kettleborough and Paul Baldwin
Scorecard	279/9 (79 overs); Ben Slater 42 (85); Mark Wood 6/46 (23 overs)			County Ground, Derby; Umpires: Richard Kettleborough and Paul Baldwin
Toss uncontested, Durham elected to field first.; Points: Durham 11, Derbyshire 10.

11–13 May 2018	Leicestershire (H)	v	Glamorgan	Leicestershire won by 3 runs
Scorecard	191 (69.1 overs); Neil Dexter 87 (172); Michael Hogan 3/41 (16 overs)		178 (58.2 overs); Nick Selman 40 (96); Varun Aaron 4/65 (16 overs)	Grace Road, Leicester; Umpires: Mike Burns and Peter Hartley
Scorecard	237 (77 overs); Ben Raine 65 (81); Michael Hogan 5/61 (29 overs)		247 (56.4 overs); Marchant de Lange 90 (45); Ben Raine 4/44 (14.4 overs)	Grace Road, Leicester; Umpires: Mike Burns and Peter Hartley
Leicestershire won the toss and elected to bat first.; Points: Leicestershire 19, Glamorgan 3.

==== June ====
9–11 June 2018	Northamptonshire (H)	v	Leicestershire	Leicestershire won by 6 wickets
Scorecard	204 (69 overs); Ricardo Vasconcelos 49 (100); Zak Chappell 6/44 (14 overs)		217 (64.4 overs); Neil Dexter 45 (69); Rory Kleinveldt 4/51 (16.4 overs)	County Ground, Northampton; Umpires: Nick Cook and Paul Baldwin
Scorecard	229 (76.1 overs); Alex Wakely 74* (143); Ben Raine 4/54 (22 overs)		217/4 (66.4 overs); Lewis Hill 85 (174); Saif Zaib 2/24 (6.4 overs)	County Ground, Northampton; Umpires: Nick Cook and Paul Baldwin
Toss uncontested, Leicestershire elected to field first.; Points: Leicestershire 19, Northamptonshire 4.; Leicestershire had 1 point deducted for slow over rates.

9–12 June 2018	Kent	v	Gloucestershire (H)	Match drawn
Scorecard	582/9d (160.4 overs); Sean Dickson 117 (214); Craig Miles 4/122 (30.4 overs)		240 (99.4 overs); Graeme van Buuren 83 (145); Matt Henry 6/58 (20 overs)	County Ground, Bristol; Umpires: Nigel Llong and Graham Lloyd
Scorecard			322/7 (126.4 overs) (f/o); Chris Dent 76 (180); Harry Podmore 2/55 (16.4 overs)	County Ground, Bristol; Umpires: Nigel Llong and Graham Lloyd
Kent won the toss and chose to bat first.; Points: Kent 12, Gloucestershire 7.

9–12 June 2018	Glamorgan	v	Warwickshire (H)	Warwickshire won by 4 wickets
Scorecard	220 (76.2 overs); David Lloyd 39 (69); Josh Poysden 5/29 (13.2 overs)		250 (93 overs); Ian Bell 106* (248); Timm van der Gugten 4/65 (20 overs)	Edgbaston, Birmingham; Umpires: Martin Saggers and Yeshwant Barde
Scorecard	323 (98.5 overs); Usman Khawaja 125 (143); Chris Wright 3/59 (16.5 overs)		294/6 (86.1 overs); Ian Bell 115* (164); Andrew Salter 4/80 (26 overs)	Edgbaston, Birmingham; Umpires: Martin Saggers and Yeshwant Barde
Glamorgan won the toss and elected to bat first.; Points: Warwickshire 21, Glamorgan 4.

9–12 June 2018	Durham (H)	v	Derbyshire	Durham won by 95 runs
Scorecard	96 (43.3 overs); Gareth Harte 20 (28); Duanne Olivier 5/20 (16 overs)		205 (58.1 overs); Matthew Critchley 38 (45); Chris Rushworth 3/57 (21.1 overs)	Riverside Ground, Chester-le-Street; Umpires: Tom Lungley and Peter Hartley
Scorecard	376 (125.4 overs); Gareth Harte 114 (259); Duanne Olivier 5/105 (40 overs)		172 (58.3 overs); Ben Slater 68 (136); Chris Rushworth 5/47 (19.3 overs)	Riverside Ground, Chester-le-Street; Umpires: Tom Lungley and Peter Hartley
Toss uncontested, Derbyshire elected to field first.; Michael Jones (Durham) and Alfie Gleadall (Derbyshire) made their first-class debuts.; Points: Durham 19, Derbyshire 4.

20–23 June 2018	Kent (H)	v	Warwickshire	Kent won by 73 runs
Scorecard	197 (54.1 overs); Joe Denly 59 (116); Keith Barker 5/32 (13.1 overs)		125 (36.4 overs); Jonathan Trott 51 (81); Harry Podmore 4/26 (8 overs)	Nevill Ground, Tunbridge Wells; Umpires: Steve O'Shaughnessy and James Middlebrook
Scorecard	446/8d (120 overs); Sean Dickson 133 (229); Keith Barker 4/64 (17.2 overs)		445 (140.1 overs); Ian Bell 172 (282); Harry Podmore 4/84 (28 overs)	Nevill Ground, Tunbridge Wells; Umpires: Steve O'Shaughnessy and James Middlebrook
Toss uncontested, Warwickshire elected to field first.; Points: Kent 19, Warwickshire 3.

20–23 June 2018	Leicestershire (H)	v	Middlesex	Middlesex won by 1 wicket
Scorecard	427 (120.2 overs); Colin Ackermann 196* (350); Tim Murtagh 5/60 (28 overs)		233 (64.2 overs); Dawid Malan 78* (128); Zak Chappell 4/65 (14 overs)	Grace Road, Leicester; Umpires: Paul Pollard and Graham Lloyd
Scorecard	186 (69.4 overs); Neil Dexter 38 (70); Tim Murtagh 3/27 (18 overs)		383/9 (117.3 overs); Stevie Eskinazi 97 (201); Gavin Griffiths 3/81 (25 overs)	Grace Road, Leicester; Umpires: Paul Pollard and Graham Lloyd
Leicestershire won the toss and elected to bat first.; Points: Middlesex 19, Leicestershire 7.

20–22 June 2018	Sussex (H)	v	Durham	Sussex won by an innings and 64 runs
Scorecard	552 (119.5 overs); Philip Salt 130 (175); Matt Salisbury 3/112 (26 overs)		211 (85.4 overs); Will Smith 90 (221); David Wiese 4/33 (15.4 overs)	Arundel Castle Cricket Club Ground, Arundel; Umpires: Yeshwant Barde and Mike Burns
Scorecard			277 (83 overs) (f/o); Stuart Poynter 84 (109); Danny Briggs 3/71 (24 overs)	Arundel Castle Cricket Club Ground, Arundel; Umpires: Yeshwant Barde and Mike Burns
Toss uncontested, Durham elected to field first.; Points: Sussex 24, Durham 3.

20–23 June 2018	Glamorgan (H)	v	Derbyshire	Match drawn
Scorecard	283 (71 overs); Andrew Salter 72* (103); Tony Palladino 5/69 (25 overs)		362 (127.5 overs); Alex Hughes 103 (186); Andrew Salter 4/105 (35 overs)	St Helen's, Swansea; Umpires: Neil Bainton and Paul Baldwin
Scorecard	403/7d (82 overs); Kiran Carlson 152 (182); Alex Hughes 2/43 (7 overs)			St Helen's, Swansea; Umpires: Neil Bainton and Paul Baldwin
Glamorgan won the toss and elected to bat first.; Prem Sisodiya (Glamorgan) made his first-class debut.; Points: Derbyshire 11, Glamorgan 8.

20–22 June 2018 (D/N)	Northamptonshire (H)	v	Gloucestershire	Northamptonshire won by 10 wickets
Scorecard	282 (80.5 overs); Luke Procter 70 (128); Matt Taylor 4/70 (12 overs)		62 (31.5 overs); Benny Howell 14 (47); Ben Sanderson 5/16 (14 overs)	County Ground, Northampton; Umpires: Neil Mallender and Chris Watts
Scorecard	32/0 (4 overs); Ben Duckett 32* (18)		250 (77.5 overs) (f/o); Ryan Higgins 63 (74); Brett Hutton 8/57 (18.5 overs)	County Ground, Northampton; Umpires: Neil Mallender and Chris Watts
Toss uncontested, Gloucestershire elected to field first.; Points: Northamptonshire 21, Gloucestershire 3.

25–28 June 2018	Northamptonshire	v	Glamorgan (H)	Northamptonshire won by 233 runs
Scorecard	281 (87 overs); Alex Wakely 82 (148); Timm van der Gugten 5/45 (18 overs)		254 (65.3 overs); Usman Khawaja 103 (140); Ben Sanderson 3/30 (16 overs)	Sophia Gardens, Cardiff; Umpires: Ben Debenham and Mike Burns
Scorecard	406/9d (99.3 overs); Ben Duckett 133 (154); Ruaidhri Smith 4/75 (20 overs)		200 (64 overs); Usman Khawaja 38 (36); Seekkuge Prasanna 4/49 (20 overs)	Sophia Gardens, Cardiff; Umpires: Ben Debenham and Mike Burns
Northamptonshire won the toss and elected to bat first.; Points: Northamptonshire 21, Glamorgan 5.

25–27 June 2018 (D/N)	Derbyshire (H)	v	Leicestershire	Leicestershire won by 6 wickets
Scorecard	245 (66 overs); Wayne Madsen 80 (143); Callum Parkinson 3/50 (11 overs)		297 (103 overs); Paul Horton 88 (194); Tony Palladino 4/64 (26 overs)	County Ground, Derby; Umpires: Steve O'Shaughnessy and Billy Taylor
Scorecard	184 (60 overs); Matthew Critchley 86 (124); Mohammad Abbas 6/54 (24 overs)		133/4 (29.4 overs); Colin Ackermann 58 (84); Duanne Olivier 2/37 (10 overs)	County Ground, Derby; Umpires: Steve O'Shaughnessy and Billy Taylor
Toss uncontested, Leicestershire elected to field first.; Points: Leicestershire 21, Derbyshire 4.

25–28 June 2018 (D/N)	Warwickshire	v	Durham (H)	Warwickshire won by 86 runs
Scorecard	424 (134 overs); Jonathan Trott 170 (286); Chris Rushworth 4/101 (38 overs)		297 (104 overs); Cameron Steel 51 (173); Oliver Hannon-Dalby 4/61 (22 overs)	Riverside Ground, Chester-le-Street; Umpires: Chris Watts and Graham Lloyd
Scorecard	185/9d (52 overs); Jonathan Trott 53 (78); Ryan Pringle 3/31 (12 overs)		226 (66 overs); Nathan Rimmington 61 (65); Jeetan Patel 6/83 (25 overs)	Riverside Ground, Chester-le-Street; Umpires: Chris Watts and Graham Lloyd
Warwickshire won the toss and elected to bat.; Points: Warwickshire 23, Durham 4.

25–27 June 2018 (D/N)	Kent (H)	v	Middlesex	Kent won by 342 runs
Scorecard	241 (71.2 overs); Adam Rouse 42 (89); James Fuller 4/86 (15.2 overs)		56 (24 overs); Stevie Eskinazi 25 (27); Grant Stewart 6/22 (10 overs)	St Lawrence Ground, Canterbury; Umpires: Nick Cook and Yeshwant Barde
Scorecard	281 (79.4 overs); Grant Stewart 103 (74); Hilton Cartwright 3/33 (14 overs)		124 (33.5 overs); Tim Murtagh 40 (21); Harry Podmore 6/36 (14 overs)	St Lawrence Ground, Canterbury; Umpires: Nick Cook and Yeshwant Barde
Kent won the toss and elected to bat first.; Points: Kent 20, Middlesex 3.

==== July ====
16–19 July 2018	Sussex	v	Gloucestershire (H)	Sussex won by 28 runs
Scorecard	286 (83 overs); Harry Finch 76 (142); Craig Miles 4/68 (18 overs)		306 (109.4 overs); Miles Hammond 103 (203); Jofra Archer 4/62 (25.4 overs)	College Ground, Cheltenham; Umpires: Ben Debenham and Alex Wharf
Scorecard	295 (73.4 overs); Harry Finch 98 (143); David Payne 4/69 (19 overs)		247 (80.3 overs); James Bracey 87 (174); Jofra Archer 4/29 (21 overs)	College Ground, Cheltenham; Umpires: Ben Debenham and Alex Wharf
Sussex won the toss and elected to bat first.; Points: Sussex 21, Gloucestershire 6

22–25 July 2018	Derbyshire (H)	v	Northamptonshire	Derbyshire won by 39 runs
Scorecard	260 (74.5 overs); Gary Wilson 66 (103); Ben Sanderson 5/53 (20 overs)		289 (68.2 overs); Alex Wakely 106 (131); Tony Palladino 4/33 (15.2 overs)	Queen's Park, Chesterfield; Umpires: Neil Bainton and Ben Debenham
Scorecard	342 (97.1 overs); Wayne Madsen 116 (182); Seekkuge Prasanna 4/104 (31.1 overs)		274/3 (69.3 overs); Luke Procter 68 (101); Matthew Critchley 6/106 (24.3 overs)	Queen's Park, Chesterfield; Umpires: Neil Bainton and Ben Debenham
Derbyshire won the toss and elected to bat first.; Dan Wheeldon (Derbyshire) made his first-class debut.; Points: Derbyshire 21, Northamptonshire 5.

22–25 July 2018	Gloucestershire (H)	v	Durham	Gloucestershire won by 41 runs
Scorecard	362 (111 overs); Ryan Higgins 105 (161); Ben Stokes 5/52 (25 overs)		275 (96.4 overs); Tom Latham 147 (281); Ryan Higgins 3/41 (16 overs)	College Ground, Cheltenham; Umpires: Chris Watts and Mike Burns
Scorecard	252 (61.3 overs); Kieran Noema-Barnett 69* (119); Ben Stokes 3/66 (18 overs)		298 (97 overs); Cameron Steel 62 (154); Matt Taylor 4/31 (16 overs)	College Ground, Cheltenham; Umpires: Chris Watts and Mike Burns
Gloucestershire won the toss and elected to bat first.; Points: Gloucestershire 23, Durham 5.

22–24 July 2018	Kent (H)	v	Leicestershire	Leicestershire won by 10 wickets
Scorecard	104 (37.5 overs); Darren Stevens 38* (54); Zak Chappell 3/14 (7 overs)		229 (80.4 overs); Ned Eckersley 74 (169); Mitchell Claydon 2/27 (11.4 overs)	St Lawrence Ground, Canterbury; Umpires: Tom Lungley and Jeff Evans
Scorecard	199 (49.2 overs); Sean Dickson 59 (72); Mohammad Abbas 4/55 (16.2 overs)		76/0 (15.4 overs); Harry Dearden 55* (62)	St Lawrence Ground, Canterbury; Umpires: Tom Lungley and Jeff Evans
Toss uncontested, Leicestershire elected to field first.; Points: Leicestershire 20, Kent 3.

22–24 July 2018	Middlesex (H)	v	Warwickshire	Middlesex won by 18 runs
Scorecard	236 (54.1 overs); James Fuller 71 (90); Ryan Sidebottom 3/34 (8 overs)		276 (77.3 overs); Will Rhodes 118 (239); James Harris 4/84 (19.3 overs)	Lord's, London; Umpires: Ian Blackwell and Billy Taylor
Scorecard	242 (80.3 overs); Stevie Eskinazi 73 (103); Jeetan Patel 5/56 (28 overs)		184 (55.5 overs); Tim Ambrose 41 (64); Tim Murtagh 4/54 (19 overs)	Lord's, London; Umpires: Ian Blackwell and Billy Taylor
Middlesex won the toss and elected to bat first.; Points: Middlesex 20, Warwickshire 5.

22–24 July 2018 (D/N)	Sussex (H)	v	Glamorgan	Sussex won by an innings and 154 runs
Scorecard	327 (95.1 overs); Luke Wells 71 (142); Michael Hogan 4/39 (25 overs)		85 (28.4 overs); Chris Cooke 32 (72); Jofra Archer 4/15 (10 overs)	County Cricket Ground, Hove; Umpires: Jeremy Lloyds and James Middlebrook
Scorecard			88 (33.3 overs) (f/o); Kiran Carlson 22 (45); Jofra Archer 4/31 (9.3 overs)	County Cricket Ground, Hove; Umpires: Jeremy Lloyds and James Middlebrook
Sussex won the toss and elected to bat first.; Points: Sussex 22, Glamorgan 3.

==== August ====
19–21 August 2018	Glamorgan (H)	v	Durham	Durham won by an innings and 30 runs
Scorecard	154 (49.1 overs); Ruaidhri Smith 36 (36); Matt Salisbury 3/34 (13 overs)		295 (73.2 overs); Axar Patel 95* (99); Ruaidhri Smith 5/87 (20 overs)	Sophia Gardens, Cardiff; Umpires: Jeff Evans and Alex Wharf
Scorecard	111 (42.2 overs); Nick Selman 26 (36); Chris Rushworth 5/28 (12.2 overs)			Sophia Gardens, Cardiff; Umpires: Jeff Evans and Alex Wharf
Toss uncontested, Durham elected to field first.; Points: Durham 21, Glamorgan 3.

19–22 August 2018	Sussex (H)	v	Derbyshire	Sussex won by 243 runs
Scorecard	440 (113 overs); Ben Brown 116 (169); Lockie Ferguson 4/106 (26 overs)		389 (100.3 overs); Billy Godleman 122 (196); Ollie Robinson 3/77 (19 overs)	County Cricket Ground, Hove; Umpires: Billy Taylor and Graham Lloyd
Scorecard	353/6d (61 overs); Philip Salt 148 (138); Matthew Critchley 3/133 (22 overs)		161 (70.2 overs); Ben Slater 40 (99); Danny Briggs 3/41 (15 overs)	County Cricket Ground, Hove; Umpires: Billy Taylor and Graham Lloyd
Toss uncontested, Derbyshire elected to field first.; Points: Sussex 24, Derbyshire 7.

19–21 August 2018	Leicestershire (H)	v	Kent	Kent won by 8 wickets
Scorecard	220 (68.3 overs); Paul Horton 49 (120); Ivan Thomas 4/35 (12.3 overs)		195 (52.2 overs); Joe Denly 62 (99); Mohammad Abbas 6/48 (17.2 overs)	Grace Road, Leicester; Umpires: Jeremy Lloyds and Neil Bainton
Scorecard	227 (62.5 overs); Harry Dearden 74 (139); Ivan Thomas 5/91 (20 overs)		253/2 (54.2 overs); Sean Dickson 134* (158); Mohammad Abbas 2/50 (14 overs)	Grace Road, Leicester; Umpires: Jeremy Lloyds and Neil Bainton
Toss uncontested, Kent elected to field first.; Ollie Robinson (Kent) made his first-class debut.; Points: Kent 19, Leicestershire 4.

19–20 August 2018	Gloucestershire	v	Warwickshire (H)	Warwickshire won by an innings and 47 runs
Scorecard	127 (46 overs); Chris Dent 35 (61); Chris Wright 5/32 (11 overs)		277 (87.4 overs); Will Rhodes 137 (233); Craig Miles 5/69 (17.4 overs)	Edgbaston, Birmingham; Umpires: Paul Baldwin and Peter Hartley
Scorecard	103 (31 overs); Benny Howell 32 (36); Ryan Sidebottom 4/42 (10 overs)			Edgbaston, Birmingham; Umpires: Paul Baldwin and Peter Hartley
Gloucestershire won the toss and elected to bat first.; Ben Charlesworth (Gloucestershire) made his first-class debut.; Points: Warwickshire 21, Gloucestershire 3.

19–22 August 2018	Northamptonshire (H)	v	Middlesex	Middlesex won by 31 runs
Scorecard	346 (103.1 overs); Ricardo Vasconcelos 140 (210); James Harris 7/83 (26.1 overs)		187 (52.2 overs); Robbie White 35 (79); Nathan Buck 4/51 (16.2 overs)	County Ground, Northampton; Umpires: Martin Saggers and Paul Pollard
Scorecard	184 (60.5 overs); Ricardo Vasconcelos 52 (80); Tim Murtagh 5/38 (17.5 overs)		374 (110.3 overs) (f/o); Max Holden 94 (164); Rory Kleinveldt 4/69 (24.3 overs)	County Ground, Northampton; Umpires: Martin Saggers and Paul Pollard
Toss uncontested, Middlesex elected to field first.; Ethan Bamber (Middlesex) made his first-class debut.; Points: Middlesex 19, Northamptonshire 6.

29 August – 1 September 2018	Kent	v	Derbyshire (H)	Kent won by 6 wickets
Scorecard	561 (131.4 overs); Joe Denly 106 (215); Tony Palladino 2/113 (30.4 overs)		400 (58 overs); Wayne Madsen 93 (157); Ivan Thomas 3/45 (10.3 overs)	County Ground, Derby; Umpires: Ian Blackwell and Nick Cook
Scorecard	110/4 (19.2 overs); Zak Crawley 34 (32); Hamidullah Qadri 2/34 (6 overs)		270 (96.4 overs) (f/o); Harvey Hosein 66* (147); Joe Denly 4/36 (14.4 overs)	County Ground, Derby; Umpires: Ian Blackwell and Nick Cook
Kent won the toss and chose to bat first.; Tom Lace (Derbyshire) made his first-class debut.; Points: Kent 23, Derbyshire 5.

29–30 August 2018	Durham (H)	v	Northamptonshire	Northamptonshire won by 7 wickets
Scorecard	129 (39.1 overs); Stuart Poynter 28 (30); Luke Procter 5/33 (10.1 overs)		198 (57.3 overs); Alex Wakely 60 (81); Matt Salisbury 4/44 (15.3 overs)	Riverside Ground, Chester-le-Street; Umpires: Neil Mallender and Neil Bainton
Scorecard	133 (47.1 overs); Cameron Steel 50 (117); Ben Sanderson 4/34 (15 overs)		65/3 (16.2 overs); Luke Procter 21 (29); Axar Patel 2/18 (4 overs)	Riverside Ground, Chester-le-Street; Umpires: Neil Mallender and Neil Bainton
Toss uncontested, Northamptonshire elected to field first.; Ben Curran (Northamptonshire) made his first-class debut.; Points: Northamptonshire 19, Durham 3.

29–31 August 2018	Glamorgan (H)	v	Warwickshire	Warwickshire won by an innings and 35 runs
Scorecard	203 (59.4 overs); Craig Meschede 53* (75); Olly Stone 4/28 (13 overs)		503 (133.3 overs); Ian Bell 204 (331); Ruaidhri Smith 3/98 (29.3 overs)	Penrhyn Avenue, Rhos-on-Sea; Umpires: Jeremy Lloyds and Paul Pollard
Scorecard	265 (77.4 overs); Ruaidhri Smith 52* (40); Jeetan Patel 7/83 (26.4 overs)			Penrhyn Avenue, Rhos-on-Sea; Umpires: Jeremy Lloyds and Paul Pollard
Toss uncontested, Warwickshire elected to field first.; Points: Warwickshire 23, Glamorgan 3.

29 August – 1 September 2018	Gloucestershire (H)	v	Leicestershire	Gloucestershire won by 328 runs
Scorecard	202 (87.3 overs); James Bracey 76 (190); Mohammad Abbas 5/30 (20.3 overs)		111 (54.2 overs); Gavin Griffiths 36* (144); Ryan Higgins 4/26 (15 overs)	County Ground, Bristol; Umpires: Martin Saggers and Billy Taylor
Scorecard	402/4d (99.3 overs); Chris Dent 214* (290); Colin Ackermann 2/26 (8.3 overs)		165 (67.1 overs); Mark Cosgrove 52 (138); Ryan Higgins 4/28 (16 overs)	County Ground, Bristol; Umpires: Martin Saggers and Billy Taylor
Toss uncontested, Leicestershire elected to field first.; Points: Gloucestershire 20, Leicestershire 3.

29–31 August 2018	Middlesex (H)	v	Sussex	Middlesex won by 55 runs
Scorecard	169 (62.5 overs); Max Holden 50* (104); Chris Jordan 3/26 (14 overs)		171 (45.5 overs); Philip Salt 32 (35); James Harris 4/61 (18 overs)	Lord's, London; Umpires: Jeff Evans and Ben Debenham
Scorecard	232 (85.4 overs); Dawid Malan 70 (176); Jofra Archer 5/69 (21.4 overs)		175 (44.5 overs); David Wiese 37* (48); James Fuller 3/37 (10.5 overs)	Lord's, London; Umpires: Jeff Evans and Ben Debenham
Toss uncontested, Sussex elected to field first.; Points: Middlesex 19, Sussex 3.

==== September ====
4–6 September 2018	Derbyshire (H)	v	Glamorgan	Derbyshire won by 169 runs
Scorecard	251 (73 overs); Billy Godleman 95 (178); Graham Wagg 3/36 (12 overs)		121 (44.3 overs); David Lloyd 25 (35); Tony Palladino 6/29 (13 overs)	County Ground, Derby; Umpires: Billy Taylor and Ben Debenham
Scorecard	171 (55.4 overs); Alex Hughes 57 (96); Kieran Bull 3/36 (14 overs)		132 (46.5 overs); Chris Cooke 67 (98); Martin Andersson 4/25 (9 overs)	County Ground, Derby; Umpires: Billy Taylor and Ben Debenham
Toss uncontested, Glamorgan elected to field first.; Points: Derbyshire 21, Glamorgan 3.

4–7 September 2018	Gloucestershire (H)	v	Middlesex	Match drawn
Scorecard	296 (121 overs); Chris Dent 82 (174); Ethan Bamber 4/81 (27 overs)		242 (96.3 overs); Dawid Malan 62 (122); Ben Charlesworth 3/25 (13 overs)	County Ground, Bristol; Umpires: Graham Lloyd and Russell Warren
Scorecard	251/8d (94 overs); Miles Hammond 123* (268); Tim Murtagh 3/29 (15 overs)		111/5 (31 overs); Sam Robson 41* (77); David Payne 2/20 (8 overs)	County Ground, Bristol; Umpires: Graham Lloyd and Russell Warren
Toss uncontested, Middlesex elected to field first.; Points: Gloucestershire 9, Middlesex 8.

4–7 September 2018	Kent (H)	v	Northamptonshire	Kent won by 102 runs
Scorecard	137 (47 overs); Daniel Bell-Drummond 23 (70); Richard Gleeson 3/16 (11 overs)		105 (36.3 overs); Brett Hutton 27 (39); Matt Henry 7/42 (16.3 overs)	St Lawrence Ground, Canterbury; Umpires: Paul Pollard and Mike Burns
Scorecard	287 (71.2 overs); Joe Denly 81 (116); Richard Gleeson 6/79 (19 overs)		217 (71.4 overs); Adam Rossington 56 (105); Matt Henry 4/72 (22 overs)	St Lawrence Ground, Canterbury; Umpires: Paul Pollard and Mike Burns
Toss uncontested, Northamptonshire elected to field first.; Points: Kent 19, Northamptonshire 3.

4–6 September 2018	Sussex (H)	v	Leicestershire	Sussex won by 274 runs
Scorecard	373 (102.3 overs); Chris Jordan 68 (88); Ben Mike 4/57 (13.3 overs)		133 (36.3 overs); Callum Parkinson 48 (52); Ollie Robinson 5/24 (10 overs)	County Ground, Hove; Umpires: Neil Mallender and Ian Blackwell
Scorecard	210 (50.3 overs); Chris Jordan 54 (75); Ben Mike 5/37 (11.3 overs)		176 (62 overs); Colin Ackermann 52 (101); Ollie Robinson 5/43 (16 overs)	County Ground, Hove; Umpires: Neil Mallender and Ian Blackwell
Sussex won the toss and elected to bat first.; Ben Mike (Leicestershire) made his first-class debut.; Points: Sussex 23, Leicestershire 3.

4–7 September 2018	Warwickshire (H)	v	Durham	Match drawn
Scorecard	310 (95.5 overs); Jonathan Trott 79 (154); Barry McCarthy 4/58 (15 overs)		292 (94.1 overs); Will Smith 45 (84); Olly Stone 7/59 (22.1 overs)	Edgbaston, Birmingham; Umpires: Michael Gough and Martin Saggers
Scorecard	199 (65.4 overs); Sam Hain 58* (58); Axar Patel 7/54 (27.4 overs)		115/8 (40.5 overs); Graham Clark 23 (31); Olly Stone 4/37 (10.5 overs)	Edgbaston, Birmingham; Umpires: Michael Gough and Martin Saggers
Toss uncontested, Durham elected to field first.; Points: Warwickshire 11, Durham 10.

10–12 September 2018	Durham (H)	v	Sussex	Durham won by 186 runs
Scorecard	103 (31.4 overs); Cameron Steel 25 (68); Ollie Robinson 5/29 (11.4 overs)		122 (25.2 overs); David Wiese 25 (20); Chris Rushworth 8/51 (13 overs)	Riverside Ground, Chester-le-Street; Umpires: Paul Pollard and Jeremy Lloyds
Scorecard	340 (108.5 overs); Cameron Steel 160 (273); Ollie Robinson 4/75 (25.5 overs)		135 (32 overs); Tom Haines 40 (43); Chris Rushworth 4/49 (12 overs)	Riverside Ground, Chester-le-Street; Umpires: Paul Pollard and Jeremy Lloyds
Toss uncontested, Sussex elected to field first.; Points: Durham 19, Sussex 3.

10–13 September 2018	Glamorgan (H)	v	Gloucestershire	Gloucestershire won by 9 wickets
Scorecard	137 (38.1 overs); Chris Cooke 60 (63); David Payne 4/25 (12.1 overs)		354 (128.4 overs); Jack Taylor 112 (214); Timm van der Gugten 4/66 (38 overs)	Sophia Gardens, Cardiff; Umpires: Neil Bainton and Ian Blackwell
Scorecard	251 (79.3 overs); David Lloyd 54 (59); Matt Taylor 5/81 (20.3 overs)		35/1 (7.5 overs); Chris Dent 25* (28); Timm van der Gugten 1/19 (4 overs)	Sophia Gardens, Cardiff; Umpires: Neil Bainton and Ian Blackwell
Toss uncontested, Gloucestershire elected to field first.; Points: Gloucestershire 22, Glamorgan 2.

10–12 September 2018	Leicestershire (H)	v	Warwickshire	Warwickshire won by an innings and 104 runs
Scorecard	100 (32.1 overs); Ben Mike 23 (30); Olly Stone 3/24 (7 overs)		400/9d (109.4 overs); Dominic Sibley 106 (168); Mohammad Abbas 3/70 (26 overs)	Grace Road, Leicester; Umpires: Graham Lloyd and Paul Baldwin
Scorecard	196 (60.4 overs); Ben Mike 39 (47); Keith Barker 5/40 (15 overs)			Grace Road, Leicester; Umpires: Graham Lloyd and Paul Baldwin
Toss uncontested, Warwickshire elected to field first.; David Sayer (Leicestershire) made his first-class debut.; Points: Warwickshire 24, Leicestershire 3.

10–12 September 2018	Middlesex (H)	v	Kent	Kent won by 3 wickets
Scorecard	161 (45.2 overs); James Fuller 37* (45); Darren Stevens 4/44 (12 overs)		192 (49.5 overs); Darren Stevens 64 (73); James Fuller 4/49 (11.5 overs)	Lord's, London; Umpires: Billy Taylor and Martin Saggers
Scorecard	186 (60.2 overs); Sam Robson 36 (61); Matt Henry 4/40 (18.2 overs)		157/7 (44 overs); Heino Kuhn 39 (73); James Fuller 3/53 (14 overs)	Lord's, London; Umpires: Billy Taylor and Martin Saggers
Toss uncontested, Kent elected to field first.; Points: Kent 19, Middlesex 3.

10–13 September 2018	Northamptonshire (H)	v	Derbyshire	Derbyshire won by 1 wicket
Scorecard	255 (76.3 overs); Saif Zaib 57 (90); Alex Hughes 4/57 (18 overs)		222 (84.3 overs); Alex Hughes 75 (152); Brett Hutton 5/59 (25.3 overs)	County Ground, Northampton; Umpires: Jeff Evans and Russell Warren
Scorecard	199 (64 overs); Ricardo Vasconcelos 62 (99); Hardus Viljoen 4/51 (16 overs)		234/9 (77 overs); Wayne Madsen 62 (119); Ben Sanderson 3/52 (27 overs)	County Ground, Northampton; Umpires: Jeff Evans and Russell Warren
Toss uncontested, Derbyshire elected to field first.; Points: Derbyshire 20, Northamptonshire 5.

18–21 September 2018	Gloucestershire (H)	v	Northamptonshire	Match drawn
Scorecard	125 (54.1 overs); Craig Miles 23 (46); Brett Hutton 4/65 (22 overs)		173 (55 overs); Adam Rossington 43 (29); David Payne 3/29 (11 overs)	County Ground, Bristol; Umpires: Paul Pollard and Mike Burns
Scorecard	6/0 (5 overs); Chris Dent 4* (19)			County Ground, Bristol; Umpires: Paul Pollard and Mike Burns
Toss uncontested, Northamptonshire elected to field first.; No play possible on Day-3 due to rain and wet outfield.; Points: Gloucestershire 8, Northamptonshire 8.

18–20 September 2018	Glamorgan	v	Kent (H)	Kent won by an innings and 172 runs
Scorecard	186 (67.1 overs); Jack Murphy 80 (182); Matt Henry 4/45 (18.1 overs)		436 (105.4 overs); Zak Crawley 168 (237); Kieran Bull 3/64 (18.4 overs)	St Lawrence Ground, Canterbury; Umpires: Jeff Evans and Russell Warren
Scorecard	78 (30.2 overs); Jack Murphy 22* (69); Darren Stevens 5/24 (13.2 overs)			St Lawrence Ground, Canterbury; Umpires: Jeff Evans and Russell Warren
Glamorgan won the toss and elected to bat first.; Points: Kent 24, Glamorgan 3.

18–19 September 2018	Leicestershire (H)	v	Durham	Leicestershire won by an innings and 194 runs
Scorecard	321 (97.5 overs); Ateeq Javid 58 (115); Matt Salisbury 3/79 (18.5 overs)		61 (28 overs); Alex Lees 16 (51); Mohammad Abbas 5/23 (8 overs)	Grace Road, Leicester; Umpires: Neil Bainton and David Millns
Scorecard			66 (24.3 overs) (f/o); Mark Wood 15* (34); Mohammad Abbas 5/29 (10.3 overs)	Grace Road, Leicester; Umpires: Neil Bainton and David Millns
Toss uncontested, Durham elected to field first.; Points: Leicestershire 22, Durham 3.

18–21 September 2018	Middlesex (H)	v	Derbyshire	Middlesex won by 117 runs
Scorecard	423 (108.4 overs); Sam Robson 134 (239); Tony Palladino 4/92 (29 overs)		295 (82.4 overs); Matthew Critchley 105 (135); James Harris 4/83 (23 overs)	Lord's, London; Umpires: Richard Kettleborough and Ben Debenham
Scorecard	199/7d (46 overs); Sam Robson 73 (81); Matthew Critchley 4/60 (15 overs)		210 (61 overs); Matthew Critchley 105* (147); Tim Murtagh 4/55 (16 overs)	Lord's, London; Umpires: Richard Kettleborough and Ben Debenham
Toss uncontested, Derbyshire elected to field first.; Points: Middlesex 24, Derbyshire 5.

18–21 September 2018	Warwickshire	v	Sussex (H)	Match drawn
Scorecard	440 (142.5 overs); Jonathan Trott 124 (244); Jofra Archer 4/66 (22.5 overs)		343 (87.4 overs); Ben Brown 99 (167); Keith Barker 3/42 (13 overs)	County Ground, Hove; Umpires: Nigel Llong and Paul Baldwin
Scorecard	381/3d (119 overs); Dominic Sibley 144* (342); Phil Salt 1/32 (9 overs)			County Ground, Hove; Umpires: Nigel Llong and Paul Baldwin
Warwickshire won the toss and elected to bat.; Points: Warwickshire 12, Sussex 9.

24–26 September 2018	Derbyshire (H)	v	Gloucestershire	Gloucestershire won by 2 wickets
Scorecard	184 (52 overs); Luis Reece 59 (90); Craig Miles 5/50 (17 overs)		163 (64.1 overs); Chris Dent 37 (125); Luis Reece 7/20 (14.1 overs)	County Ground, Derby; Umpires: Neil Mallender and David Millns
Scorecard	157 (60.3 overs); Alex Hughes 55* (156); Ryan Higgins 3/17 (13 overs)		179/8 (53.5 overs); Benny Howell 58 (67); Lockie Ferguson 4/56 (19 overs)	County Ground, Derby; Umpires: Neil Mallender and David Millns
Toss uncontested, Gloucestershire elected to field first.; Points: Gloucestershire 19, Derbyshire 3.

24–26 September 2018	Middlesex	v	Durham (H)	Middlesex won by 57 runs
Scorecard	121 (28.5 overs); James Harris 31 (37); Matt Salisbury 6/37 (12 overs)		310 (91 overs); Gareth Harte 112 (234); Tim Murtagh 4/56 (21 overs)	Riverside Ground, Chester-le-Street; Umpires: Michael Gough and Steve O'Shaughnessy
Scorecard	355 (113.2 overs); Stephen Eskinazi 96 (132); Mark Wood 5/94 (26.2 overs)		109 (39.4 overs); Stuart Poynter 23 (29); Tim Murtagh 3/29 (12 overs)	Riverside Ground, Chester-le-Street; Umpires: Michael Gough and Steve O'Shaughnessy
Middlesex won the toss and elected to bat first.; Points: Middlesex 19, Durham 6.

24–26 September 2018	Glamorgan (H)	v	Leicestershire	Glamorgan won by 132 runs
Scorecard	359 (103.4 overs); Kiran Carlson 83 (94); Gavin Griffiths 3/71 (21.4 overs)		132 (48.3 overs); Harry Dearden 48 (87); Graham Wagg 3/25 (10 overs)	Sophia Gardens, Cardiff; Umpires: Jeremy Lloyds and Ian Blackwell
Scorecard	175 (57.4 overs); Chris Cooke 45 (72); Tom Taylor 4/15 (12 overs)		270 (71.1 overs); Dieter Klein 94 (100); Michael Hogan 4/30 (16 overs)	Sophia Gardens, Cardiff; Umpires: Jeremy Lloyds and Ian Blackwell
Toss uncontested, Leicestershire elected to field first.; Points: Glamorgan 23, Leicestershire 3.

24–25 September 2018	Sussex	v	Northamptonshire (H)	Northamptonshire won by 6 wickets
Scorecard	118 (35.1 overs); Laurie Evans 34 (57); Ben Sanderson 4/32 (12 overs)		171 (50.3 overs); Ben Curran 36 (36); Ollie Robinson 4/55 (17 overs)	County Ground, Northampton; Umpires: Ben Debenham and Nigel Llong
Scorecard	222 (59.1 overs); Harry Finch 63 (77); Ben Cotton 5/48 (14 overs)		172/4 (37.1 overs); Ben Curran 83* (111); Ollie Robinson 3/48 (16 overs)	County Ground, Northampton; Umpires: Ben Debenham and Nigel Llong
Sussex won the toss and elected to bat first.; Points: Northamptonshire 19, Sussex 3.

24–26 September 2018	Kent	v	Warwickshire (H)	Warwickshire won by an innings and 34 runs
Scorecard	167 (59 overs); Matt Henry 32* (48); Chris Wright 3/29 (15 overs)		380 (115.5 overs); Dominic Sibley 119 (287); Joe Denly 3/48 (18.5 overs)	Edgbaston, Birmingham; Umpires: Graham Lloyd and Tim Robinson
Scorecard	179 (56 overs); Zak Crawley 75 (152); Olly Stone 3/35 (10.2 overs)			Edgbaston, Birmingham; Umpires: Graham Lloyd and Tim Robinson
Kent won the toss and elected to bat first.; Points: Warwickshire 23, Kent 2.

== Standings ==
Teams receive 16 points for a win, 8 for a tie and 5 for a draw. Bonus points (a maximum of 5 batting points and 3 bowling points) may be scored during the first 110 overs of each team's first innings.

=== Division One ===
Team	Pld	W	L	T	D	A	Bat	Bowl	Ded	Pts
Surrey (C)	14	10	1	0	3	0	41	38	0	254
Somerset	14	7	2	1	4	0	33	35	0	208
Essex	14	7	4	0	2	1	25	35	0	187
Yorkshire	14	5	5	0	3	1	25	33	0	158
Hampshire	14	4	5	0	5	0	16	39	0	144
Nottinghamshire	14	4	8	0	2	0	21	38	0	133
Lancashire (R)	14	3	7	1	3	0	23	40	1	133
Worcestershire (R)	14	2	10	0	2	0	23	39	0	104

Source: CricInfo

- Surrey were Division One Champions
- Lancashire and Worcestershire were relegated to Division Two

=== Division Two ===
Team	Pld	W	L	T	D	A	Bat	Bowl	Ded	Pts
Warwickshire (P)	14	9	2	0	3	0	41	42	0	242
Kent (P)	14	10	3	0	1	0	16	40	0	221
Sussex	14	6	4	0	4	0	32	38	0	186
Middlesex	14	7	4	0	3	0	14	38	0	179
Gloucestershire	14	5	4	0	5	0	15	37	0	157
Leicestershire	14	5	7	0	2	0	22	40	3	149
Derbyshire	14	4	7	0	3	0	30	38	0	147
Durham	14	4	7	0	3	1	16	35	0	130
Northamptonshire	14	4	8	0	1	1	14	38	0	126
Glamorgan	14	2	10	0	2	0	13	38	1	92

Source: Cricinfo

- Warwickshire and Kent were promoted to Division One

== Statistics ==
=== Division One ===
- Highest score by a team: Surrey − 592 all out (119.3 overs) vs Nottinghamshire (22−25 July)
- Lowest score by a team: Yorkshire − 50 all out (18.4 overs) vs Essex (4−6 May)
- Top score by an individual: Dane Vilas (Lancashire − 235* (363) vs Somerset (4−7 May)
- Best bowling figures by an individual: Jack Leach (Somerset) − 8/85 (48 overs) vs Essex (19−22 August)

==== Most runs ====
Player	Team	Matches	Innings	Runs	Average	HS	100s	50s
Rory Burns	Surrey	14	22	1,359	64.71	193	4	7
James Hildreth	Somerset	14	26	1,089	45.37	184	3	6
Ollie Pope	Surrey	13	16	986	70.42	158*	4	1
James Vince	Hampshire	14	25	962	40.08	201*	3	2
Daryl Mitchell	Worcestershire	14	26	957	36.80	178	4	1

Source: ESPNcricinfo

==== Most wickets ====
Players	Team	Matches	Overs	Wickets	Average	BBI	5w	10w
Tom Bailey	Lancashire	14	439.4	64	19.65	5/53	1	0
Morné Morkel	Surrey	10	315.4	59	14.32	6/57	4	0
Jamie Porter	Essex	13	432.3	58	24.63	7/41	3	1
Graham Onions	Lancashire	12	379.3	57	21.77	6/55	2	0
Simon Harmer	Essex	13	526.2	57	24.45	6/87	3	0

Source: ESPNcricinfo

=== Division Two ===
- Highest score by a team: Kent − 582/9d (160.4 overs) vs Gloucestershire (9−12 June)
- Lowest score by a team: Middlesex − 56 all out (24 overs) vs Kent (25−27 June)
- Top score by an individual: Chris Dent (Gloucestershire) − 214* (290) vs Leicestershire (29 August − 1 September)
- Best bowling figures by an individual: Brett Hutton (Northamptonshire) − 8/57 (18.5 overs) vs Gloucestershire (20−22 June)

==== Most runs ====
Player	Team	Matches	Innings	Runs	Average	HS	100s	50s
Ian Bell	Warwickshire	14	23	1,027	54.05	204	5	2
Wayne Madsen	Derbyshire	14	27	1,016	37.62	144	2	7
Will Rhodes	Warwickshire	14	23	972	44.18	137	4	4
Jonathan Trott	Warwickshire	14	23	935	46.75	170*	2	6
Ben Brown	Sussex	14	24	912	43.42	116	1	7

Source: ESPNcricinfo

==== Most wickets ====
Players	Team	Matches	Overs	Wickets	Average	BBI	5w	10w
Matt Henry	Kent	11	382.4	75	15.48	7/42	5	3
Ollie Robinson	Sussex	14	485.0	74	18.66	7/58	4	1
James Harris	Middlesex	12	384.5	61	20.54	7/83	3	0
Ben Sanderson	Northamptonshire	13	422.0	60	16.70	5/16	2	0
Chris Rushworth	Durham	12	386.4	60	20.01	8/51	3	1

Source: ESPNcricinfo
