= Dillon Pennington =

English cricketer (born 1999)

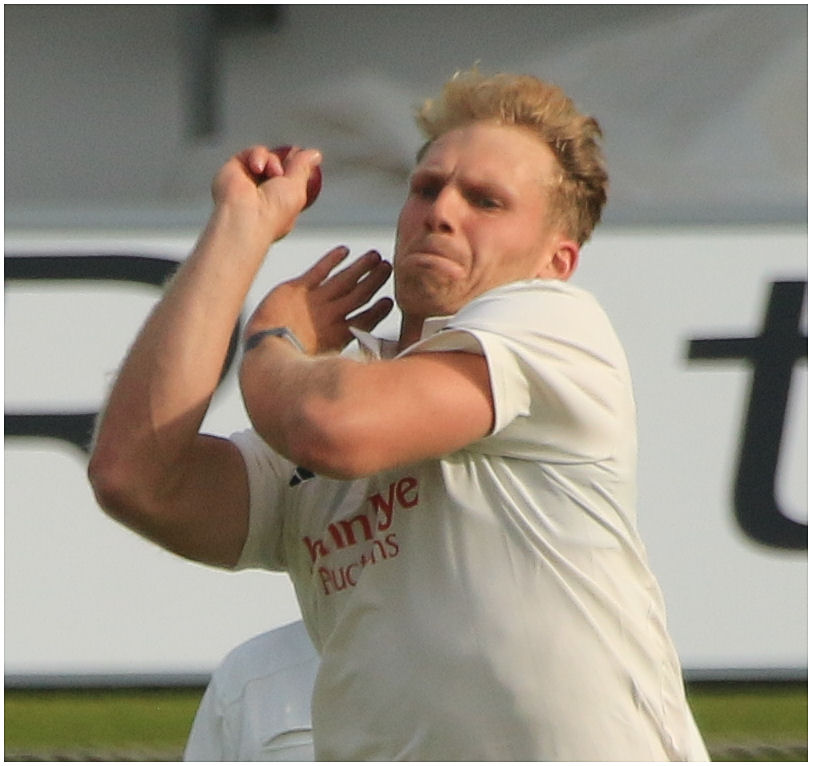
- Pennington in 2025

Personal information
- Born: 26 February 1999 (age 27); Shrewsbury, Shropshire, England
- Batting: Right-handed
- Bowling: Right-arm fast
- Role: Bowler

Domestic team information
- Years: Team
- 2018–2023: Worcestershire (squad no. 22)
- 2021: Birmingham Phoenix
- 2024–2026: Nottinghamshire (squad no. 18)
- 2024: Northern Superchargers
- First-class debut: 25 June 2018 Worcs v Nottinghamshire
- List A debut: 7 June 2018 Worcs v Warwickshire

Career statistics
Competition	FC	LA	T20
Matches	71	24	82
Runs scored	897	132	148
Batting average	12.45	18.85	10.57
100s/50s	0/2	0/0	0/0
Top score	61	35	37*
Balls bowled	11,878	1,269	1,485
Wickets	230	43	80
Bowling average	27.93	28.04	28.52
5 wickets in innings	5	1	0
10 wickets in match	0	0	0
Best bowling	5/32	5/67	4/9
Catches/stumpings	16/–	5/–	24/–
- Source: Cricinfo, 26 September 2026

Dillon Pennington (born 26 February 1999) is an English cricketer. He made his List A debut for Worcestershire in the 2018 Royal London One-Day Cup on 7 June 2018. Prior to his List A debut, he was named in England's squad for the 2018 Under-19 Cricket World Cup.

He made his first-class debut for Worcestershire in the 2018 County Championship on 25 June 2018. He made his Twenty20 debut for Worcestershire in the 2018 t20 Blast on 8 July 2018. In May 2021, in the 2021 County Championship match against Derbyshire, Pennington took his maiden five-wicket haul in first-class cricket. Ahead of the inaugural season of The Hundred, he was signed by the Birmingham Phoenix. Pennington joined Nottinghamshire at the end of the 2023 season. He received his first call-up to the England squad on 30 June 2024 when he was named among the 14 players for a three-match Test series against West Indies. Pennington was named in the England Lions squad for their tour of South Africa in November and December 2024. Pennington signed a new three-year contract with Nottinghamshire in December 2024. He was given a late call-up to join the England Lions squad for their tour of Australia in January 2025.
