= Tom Barber (cricketer) =

English cricketer

Personal information
- Full name: Thomas Edward Barber
- Born: 8 August 1995 (age 31); Poole, Dorset, England
- Batting: Right-handed
- Bowling: Left-arm fast

Domestic team information
- Years: Team
- 2014–2015: Hampshire (squad no. 20)
- 2017–2019: Middlesex (squad no. 25)
- 2020–2021: Nottinghamshire (squad no. 18)
- First-class debut: 27 April 2018 Middlesex v Glamorgan
- List A debut: 14 August 2014; Hampshire v Sri Lanka A

Career statistics
| Competition | FC | LA | T20 |
|---|---|---|---|
| Matches | 5 | 10 | 10 |
| Runs scored | 5 | 1 | 2 |
| Batting average | 2.50 | 0.16 | 0.50 |
| 100s/50s | 0/0 | 0/0 | 0/0 |
| Top score | 3 | 1 | 2 |
| Balls bowled | 678 | 348 | 185 |
| Wickets | 7 | 10 | 11 |
| Bowling average | 60.00 | 37.10 | 32.90 |
| 5 wickets in innings | 0 | 0 | 0 |
| 10 wickets in match | 0 | 0 | 0 |
| Best bowling | 3/42 | 3/62 | 4/28 |
| Catches/stumpings | 0/– | 0/– | 1/– |
- Source: CricketArchive, 26 September 2021

Thomas Edward Barber (born 8 August 1995) is an English cricketer. Born in Poole, Dorset, Barber is a left-arm fast bowler who bats right-handed.

Barber is a steadily progressing left-arm seamer who has been a fixture for the England U19s since the South Africa tour of 2012. He has played for the Hampshire academy in the Southern Premier League and was given opportunities for Hampshire second XI in 2013 and was awarded a scholarship contract for 2014.

Barber made his Hampshire debut against a touring Sri Lanka A side on 14 August 2014. Barber finished with figures of 0/28 from 4 overs in the game which was later rain abandoned. Barber would go on to make his 'competitive' debut for Hampshire just a week later in a Royal London 50 over match against Yorkshire. Barber fought hard in a losing cause in this match finishing with his best figures so far in his short career of 2/22 from 4 overs, dismissing Yorkshire batsmen Kane Williamson (33) and Yorkshire captain Andrew Gale (0) in consecutive balls. Barber though was dismissed is the first innings while batting for 0 from only 2 balls by Adil Rashid as Hampshire were defeated by 6 wickets.

Barber has also featured regularly for the England U19s featuring heavily in a tour series against South Africa U19s in 2012.

On 30 May 2017, Barber signed for Middlesex until the end of the season. He made his Twenty20 cricket debut for Middlesex in the 2017 NatWest t20 Blast on 3 August 2017. in the winter of 2017/18 he was part of the England fast bowling camp at Potchefstroom. He was plucked from the camp to play in the North v South series. Daniel Norcross was very impressed describing him as ‘a left-arm bowler of genuine pace, he extracted serious bounce from some fairly lifeless surfaces’ and said that he was one to watch.

He made his first-class debut for Middlesex in the 2018 County Championship on 27 April 2018.

He signed a one-year contract with Nottinghamshire on 17 January 2020. In September 2021 it was announced that Barber was to leave the county having taken 6 wickets in his two seasons at the club.
