= Amar Virdi =

English cricketer (born 1998)

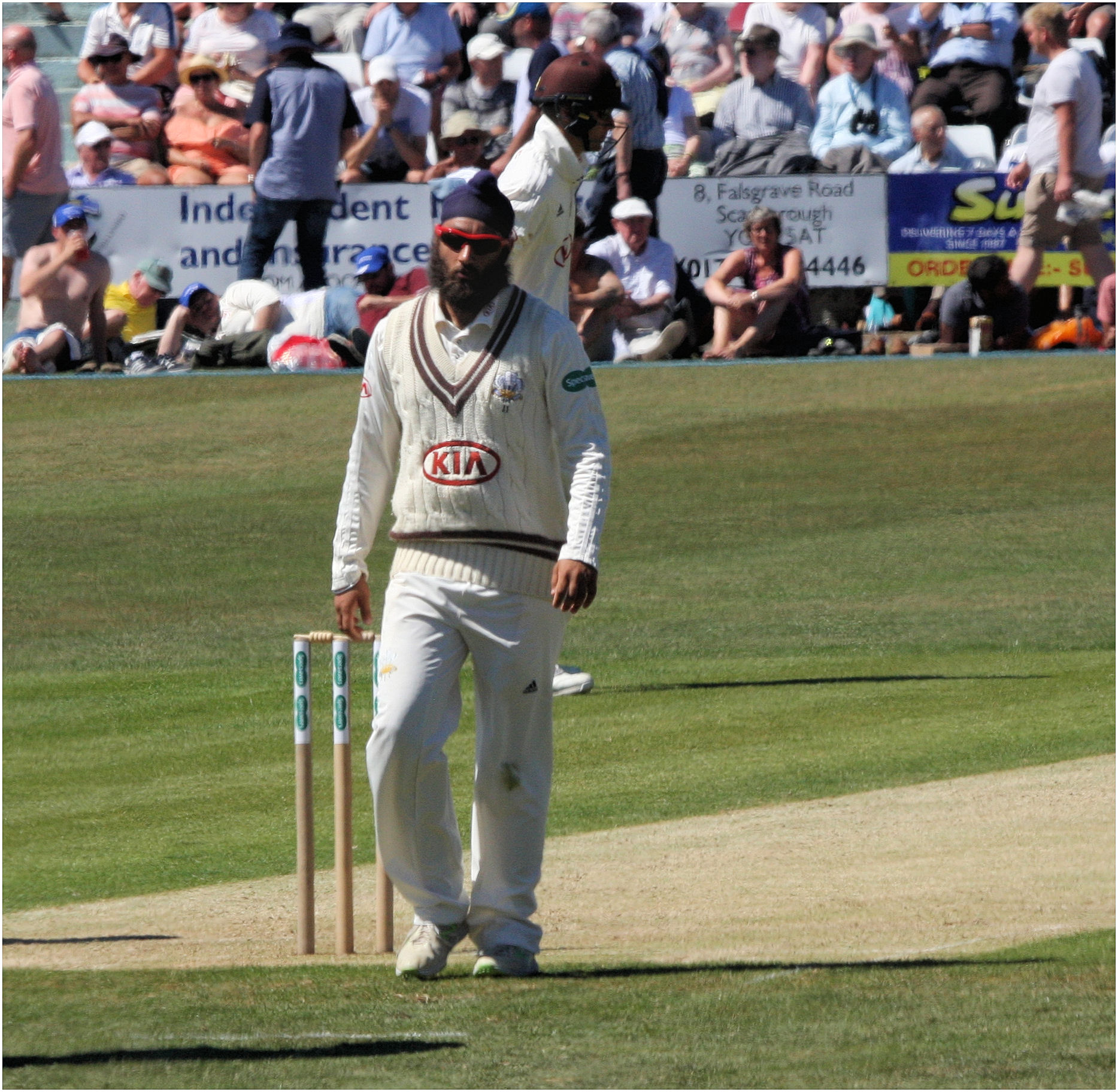

Personal information
- Full name: Guramar Singh Virdi
- Born: 19 July 1998 (age 28); Chiswick, London, England
- Height: 5 ft 10 in (1.78 m)
- Batting: Right-handed
- Bowling: Right-arm off break
- Role: Bowler

Domestic team information
- Years: Team
- 2016–2024: Surrey (squad no. 19)
- 2022: → Somerset (on loan)
- 2024: → Worcestershire (on loan)
- First-class debut: 26 May 2017 Surrey v Essex
- List A debut: 2 August 2022 Surrey v Leicestershire

Career statistics
| Competition | FC | LA |
|---|---|---|
| Matches | 45 | 10 |
| Runs scored | 292 | 31 |
| Batting average | 10.42 | 5.16 |
| 100s/50s | 0/0 | 0/0 |
| Top score | 42 | 8 |
| Balls bowled | 7,723 | 300 |
| Wickets | 137 | 7 |
| Bowling average | 31.00 | 41.42 |
| 5 wickets in innings | 6 | 0 |
| 10 wickets in match | 1 | 0 |
| Best bowling | 8/61 | 3/38 |
| Catches/stumpings | 12/– | 1/– |
- Source: Cricinfo, 29 September 2024

Guramar Singh Virdi (born 19 July 1998), known as Amar Virdi, is an English cricketer. An off-spin bowler, Virdi played in two Under-19 internationals for England against Sri Lanka in 2016. He made his first-class debut for Surrey in the 2017 County Championship on 26 May 2017.

== Career ==
Virdi was the leading English-born spin bowler in the 2018 County Championship with 39 wickets. He struggled with a stress injury to his back in January 2019, which kept him out of the opening weeks of the 2019 cricket season, and was asked by Surrey to lose some weight and improve his fitness while he recovered. Surrey's director of cricket, Alec Stewart, called it "tough love". When Virdi returned to the Surrey team in mid-July for his first match of the season he took 14 wickets in the victory over Nottinghamshire: 8 for 61 and 6 for 78.

During the COVID pandemic in 2020–21, Virdi was included in England's training and reserve squads for Test series at home against the West Indies, away against Sri Lanka, and India.

Virdi was released by Surrey in November 2024, having struggled to get into the team for a number of years and a spell on loan at Worcestershire.

== Personal life ==
Virdi is a practising Sikh. His family originate from the Punjab, but his parents emigrated to the UK from Kenya and Uganda. He grew up in a sporting family: his father represented Kenya in junior tennis and his brother introduced him to cricket. As a teenager, he turned down offers of scholarships from private schools because he didn't wish to board, and because he had been playing adult cricket since he was 13.
