= Gareth Harte =

English cricketer (born 1993)

Personal information
- Full name: Gareth Jason Harte
- Born: 15 March 1993 (age 33); Johannesburg, South Africa
- Batting: Right-handed
- Bowling: Right-arm medium
- Role: Batsman

Domestic team information
- Years: Team
- 2017–2020: Durham (squad no. 93)
- First-class debut: 20 April 2018 Durham v Kent
- List A debut: 25 May 2018 Durham v Worcestershire

Career statistics
Competition	FC	LA	T20
Matches	25	9	5
Runs scored	1,201	205	24
Batting average	28.59	41.00	6.00
100s/50s	3/4	0/1	0/0
Top score	114	51*	11
Balls bowled	1,139	180	18
Wickets	15	4	1
Bowling average	42.33	43.00	20.00
5 wickets in innings	0	0	0
10 wickets in match	0	0	0
Best bowling	4/15	2/35	1/11
Catches/stumpings	6/–	2/–	4/–
- Source: Cricinfo, 9 September 2020

Gareth Jason Harte (born 15 March 1993) is a South African-born English cricketer. He made his Twenty20 cricket debut for Durham in the 2017 NatWest t20 Blast on 23 July 2017. He made his first-class debut for Durham in the 2018 County Championship on 20 April 2018. He made his List A debut for Durham in the 2018 Royal London One-Day Cup on 25 May 2018.
