= Alfie Gleadall =

English cricketer (born 2000)

Personal information
- Full name: Alfie Frank Gleadall
- Born: 28 May 2000 (age 26); Chesterfield, Derbyshire, England
- Batting: Left-handed
- Bowling: Right-arm medium-fast

Domestic team information
- Years: Team
- 2017–2019: Derbyshire
- First-class debut: 9 June 2018; Derbyshire v Durham
- List A debut: 29 May 2017; Derbyshire v South Africa A

Career statistics
Competition	FC	LA
Matches	2	3
Runs scored	29	–
Batting average	9.66	–
100s/50s	0/0	–/–
Top score	27*	–
Balls bowled	153	102
Wickets	1	3
Bowling average	119.00	41.00
5 wickets in innings	0	0
10 wickets in match	0	0
Best bowling	1/20	3/43
Catches/stumpings	0/–	0/–
- Source: Cricinfo, 26 September 2019

Alfie Frank Gleadall (born 28 May 2000) is an English cricketer. He made his List A debut for Derbyshire against South Africa A on 29 May 2017. He made his first-class debut for Derbyshire against Durham on 9 June 2018 in the 2018 County Championship.
