= Ben Brown (cricketer) =

English cricketer (born 1988)

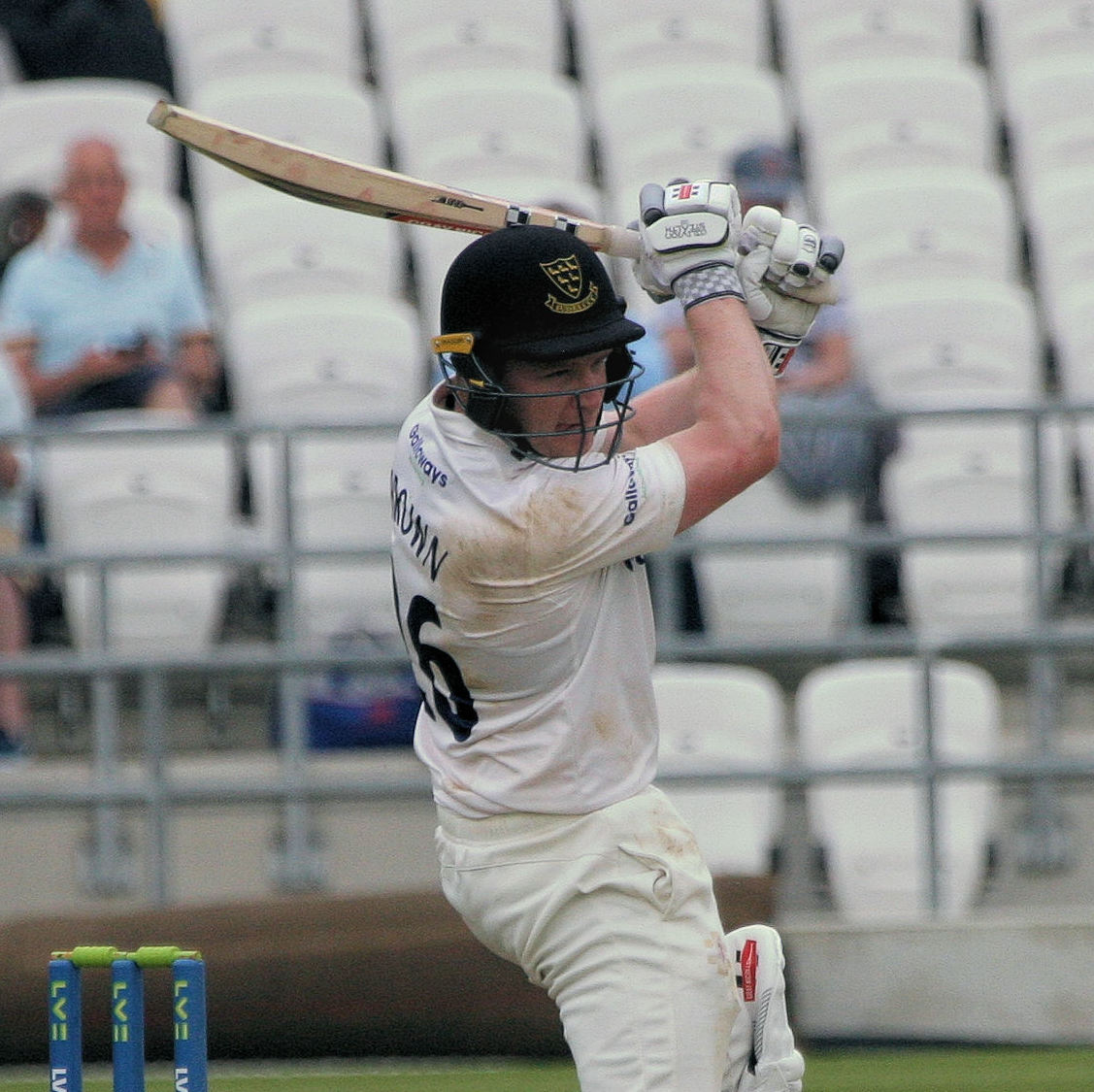
- Brown batting for Sussex in June 2021

Personal information
- Full name: Ben Christopher Brown
- Born: 23 November 1988 (age 37); Crawley, West Sussex, England
- Height: 5 ft 8 in (1.73 m)
- Batting: Right-handed
- Bowling: Slow left-arm orthodox
- Role: Wicketkeeper

Domestic team information
- Years: Team
- 2007–2021: Sussex (squad no. 26)
- 2022–present: Hampshire (squad no. 10)
- FC debut: 19 July 2007 Sussex v Sri Lanka A
- LA debut: 16 September 2007 Sussex v Nottinghamshire

Career statistics
Competition	FC	LA	T20
Matches	225	120	82
Runs scored	12,001	2,332	840
Batting average	38.83	26.80	15.00
100s/50s	28/60	2/15	0/1
Top score	165*	139*	68
Balls bowled	144	–	–
Wickets	1	–	–
Bowling average	130.00	–	–
5 wickets in innings	0	–	–
10 wickets in match	0	–	–
Best bowling	1/48	–	–
Catches/stumpings	658/28	124/13	41/7
- Source: CricInfo, 26 September 2026

Ben Christopher Brown (born 23 November 1988) is an English cricketer who plays for Hampshire County Cricket Club as a wicket-keeper and right-handed batsman. He had previously played for Sussex County Cricket Club serving as captain from 2017 to 2021.

== Early life ==
Brown was born in Crawley, West Sussex and educated at Ardingly College.

Brown came through the Sussex youth system, first appearing at under-11 level and going on to make his second XI debut in May 2004. He was a regular for the England under-19 team between 2007 and 2008 featuring in four 'Tests' and 24 'ODIs' including five appearances at the 2008 Under-19 Cricket World Cup.

== Sussex ==
In July 2007, Brown made his first-class debut for Sussex in a tour match against Sri Lanka A scoring 46 off 25 balls and made his List A debut against Nottinghamshire in September 2007.

Brown's initial opportunities as wicket-keeper were limited by the presence of Matt Prior and Andrew Hodd, but Brown did play eight group games in the 2009 Twenty20 Cup, a competition Sussex would go on to win. On his County Championship debut against Worcestershire in May 2010, he was dismissed for a four-ball duck. He scored his maiden first-class century later that season against Derbyshire in an innings where all of Sussex's top four batsmen made hundreds.

In May 2014, Brown scored a then career-best of 163 against Durham. In partnership with Luke Wright they added a county record 335 for the sixth wicket having come together at 115/5. Brown's score surpassed the best achieved by a number seven batsman for Sussex previously held by Jim Parks. Later that season Brown was awarded his county cap.

In the 2015 season, Brown was one of only two Sussex players to score over 1,000 runs in the County Championship; Brown scored 1,031 Championship runs at an average of 44.82, with four centuries. In December 2015, Brown signed a new contract to stay at Sussex until 2018, and was announced as the county's vice-captain. Sussex head coach Mark Davis described him as a "natural leader".

Following the captaincy resignation of Luke Wright midway through the 2017 season, Brown was named skipper for the remainder of the County Championship campaign. Ahead of the 2018 season he was named the permanent club captain. He finished the year as Sussex's leading run-scorer with over 1,000 first-class runs as well as completing 55 dismissals.

In July 2021, Brown was removed as captain following Sussex's poor performance in the first phase of the 2021 County Championship. His own contribution across the season was 976 runs at an average of 51.36 including four centuries, he ended the campaign batting at number three as a specialist batsman. In December 2021, Sussex announced that they had agreed to Brown's request to leave the club and end his contract which had two years remaining.

== Hampshire ==
In January 2022, Hampshire announced the signing of Brown on an initial two-year contract. On 7 April 2022, he made his county debut against Somerset. Two weeks after his debut he made his first century for the club as he hit 157 against Kent, sharing in a stand of 273 with Liam Dawson which broke the Hampshire fifth wicket record.

In May 2024, Brown scored a career-best 165 not out against Surrey as Hampshire inflicted one of their opponents heaviest defeats.

He was named as Hampshire's red-ball captain in January 2025.
