= Ryan Sidebottom (Australian cricketer) =

Australian cricketer (born 1989)

Personal information
- Full name: Ryan Nathan Sidebottom
- Born: 14 August 1989 (age 37); Shepparton, Victoria, Australia
- Height: 6 ft 4 in (1.93 m)
- Batting: Right-handed
- Bowling: Right-arm medium-fast
- Role: Bowler

Domestic team information
- Years: Team
- 2013: Victoria
- 2017–2022: Warwickshire (squad no. 22)
- 2022: → Derbyshire (on loan)
- First-class debut: 14 March 2013 Victoria v Tasmania
- List A debut: 22 July 2021 Warwickshire v Glamorgan

Career statistics
Competition	FC	LA	T20
Matches	27	2	1
Runs scored	135	11	3
Batting average	6.75	–	3.00
100s/50s	0/0	0/0	0/0
Top score	27*	9*	3
Balls bowled	3,431	100	24
Wickets	67	2	1
Bowling average	31.08	48.50	37.00
5 wickets in innings	1	0	0
10 wickets in match	1	0	0
Best bowling	6/35	1/41	1/37
Catches/stumpings	5/–	1/–	1/–
- Source: ESPNcricinfo, 7 October 2022

Ryan Nathan Sidebottom (born 14 August 1989) is an Australian cricketer. He plays for Warwickshire as a pace bowler and has previously played for Victoria. His younger brother Steele plays Australian rules football for Collingwood.

In August 2017, Sidebottom was signed for the remainder of the English season by Warwickshire, having had success with their second team and with Berkswell Cricket Club in the Birmingham and District Premier League. He made his Twenty20 debut on 9 July 2021, for Warwickshire in the 2021 T20 Blast. He made his List A debut on 22 July 2021, for Warwickshire in the 2021 Royal London One-Day Cup.
