= Gavin Griffiths =

English cricketer (born 1993)

Personal information
- Full name: Gavin Timothy Griffiths
- Born: 19 November 1993 (age 32); Ormskirk, Lancashire, England
- Batting: Right-handed
- Bowling: Right-arm fast-medium
- Role: Bowler

Domestic team information
- Years: Team
- 2014–2016: Lancashire (squad no. 18)
- 2016: → Hampshire (loan)
- 2017-2022: Leicestershire (squad no. 7)
- FC debut: 28 March 2016 Leicestershire v Loughborough MCCU
- LA debut: 14 August 2014 Lancashire v Northamptonshire

Career statistics
Competition	FC	LA	T20
Matches	31	26	60
Runs scored	370	39	56
Batting average	14.23	9.75	18.66
100s/50s	0/0	0/0	0/0
Top score	40	15*	12
Balls bowled	4,141	1,174	992
Wickets	67	33	53
Bowling average	34.68	35.60	27.49
5 wickets in innings	1	0	0
10 wickets in match	1	0	0
Best bowling	6/49	4/30	4/24
Catches/stumpings	4/–	11/–	12/–
- Source: CricketArchive, 25 September 2021

Gavin Timothy Griffiths (born 19 November 1993) is an English cricketer who most recently played for Leicestershire County Cricket Club. He is a right-arm fast-medium bowler, who also bats right-handed. He made his one-day debut for Lancashire against Northamptonshire in August 2014.

He made his first-class debut on 28 March 2017 for Leicestershire against Loughborough MCCU as part of the Marylebone Cricket Club University fixtures.
