= Ben Slater =

English cricketer (born 1991)

Personal information
- Full name: Benjamin Thomas Slater
- Born: 26 August 1991 (age 35); Chesterfield, Derbyshire, England
- Nickname: Slats, Slatsy
- Batting: Left-handed
- Bowling: Right-arm leg break
- Role: Batsman

Domestic team information
- Years: Team
- 2012: Leeds/Bradford MCCU
- 2012: Southern Rocks (squad no. 26)
- 2013–2018: Derbyshire
- 2018: → Nottinghamshire (on loan)
- 2019–present: Nottinghamshire (squad no. 26)
- 2020: → Leicestershire (on loan)
- FC debut: 31 March 2012 Leeds/Bradford MCCU v Surrey
- LA debut: 6 October 2012 Southern Rocks v Mashonaland Eagles

Career statistics
Competition	FC	LA	T20
Matches	171	78	18
Runs scored	10,056	3,301	325
Batting average	35.03	49.26	20.31
100s/50s	16/54	8/20	0/1
Top score	225*	164	57
Balls bowled	495	26	–
Wickets	3	0	–
Bowling average	87.66	–	–
5 wickets in innings	0	–	–
10 wickets in match	0	–	–
Best bowling	1/1	–	–
Catches/stumpings	61/–	13/–	1/–
- Source: ESPNcricinfo, 26 September 2026

Benjamin Thomas Slater (born 26 August 1991) is an English cricketer who plays for Nottinghamshire. Slater is a left-handed batsman who bowls right-arm off break. He was born in Chesterfield, Derbyshire.

Slater was educated at Netherthorpe School, before studying Sport and Business Management at Leeds Metropolitan University. While attending the university, he was selected to play for Leeds/Bradford MCCU, making his first-class debut in the team's inaugural first-class match against Surrey at The Oval in 2012. He made a second first-class appearance for the team in that same season against Yorkshire at Headingley. He was also a member of Derbyshire's squad for the 2012 season.

In April 2022, in the 2022 County Championship, Slater scored his maiden double century in first-class cricket, with an unbeaten 225 against Durham.

Slater scored a List A career best 164 against Surrey on 4 August 2024. He was named Nottinghamshire One-Day Cup player of the year for the 2024 season and was rewarded with a new three-year contract in December that year.

On 15 September 2026, Slater passed 10,000 first-class runs during Nottinghamshire's first innings of their County Championship match against Sussex at Hove.
