= Chris Dent =

English cricketer

Personal information
- Full name: Christopher David James Dent
- Born: 20 January 1991 (age 35); Bristol, England
- Height: 5 ft 9 in (1.75 m)
- Batting: Left-handed
- Bowling: Slow left-arm orthodox

Domestic team information
- Years: Team
- 2009–2025: Gloucestershire (squad no. 15)
- FC debut: 15 April 2010 Gloucestershire v Northamptonshire
- LA debut: 27 September 2009 Gloucestershire v Nottinghamshire

Career statistics
Competition	FC	LA	T20
Matches	189	90	78
Runs scored	11,237	2,446	1,543
Batting average	36.01	30.96	24.10
100s/50s	21/67	5/7	0/8
Top score	268	151*	87
Balls bowled	1,283	444	120
Wickets	10	12	5
Bowling average	84.60	35.00	33.60
5 wickets in innings	0	0	0
10 wickets in match	0	0	0
Best bowling	2/21	4/43	1/4
Catches/stumpings	185/–	31/–	28/–
- Source: ESPNcricinfo, 26 May 2025

Christopher David James Dent (born 20 January 1991) is a former English cricketer. He was a left-handed batsman and played for Gloucestershire. He was born in Bristol.

== Career ==
Dent played for Gloucestershire at Under-15 and Under-17 level as a member of their academy squad, while playing club cricket for Thornbury in the West of England Premier League. Dent played for the Gloucestershire Second XI from 2007, before signing his first professional contract with the club in August 2009.

Dent made his List A début in September 2009, against Nottinghamshire. He did not bat or bowl in the match, as Gloucestershire reached their winning target of 58 runs with nine wickets to spare.

In 2009 Dent was selected for the England Under-19 tour of Bangladesh, and in January 2010 was a member of the England squad at the Under 19 Cricket World Cup.

Dent played in nearly all of Gloucestershire's games for 2013, averaging 45.12 with the bat scoring a total of 1,128 runs, the first time he had scored 1000 runs in a season.

At the start of the 2018 season, Dent was appointed club captain for both the County Championship and the One Day Cup competitions.

In April 2022, in the 2022 County Championship, Dent scored his 10,000th run in first-class cricket.

In July 2025, Dent announced his retirement from professional cricket with immediate effect.

== Career best performances ==
as of 4 September 2020

	Batting					Bowling				
	Score	Fixture	Venue	Season	Ref	Figures	Fixture	Venue	Season	Ref
FC	268	Gloucestershire v Glamorgan	Bristol	2015		2-21	Gloucestershire v Sussex	Hove	2016	
LA	151*	Gloucestershire Gladiators v Glamorgan	Cardiff	2013		4-43	Gloucestershire Gladiators v Leicestershire Foxes	Bristol	2012	
T20	87	Gloucestershire v Worcestershire Rapids	Bristol	2020		1-4	Gloucestershire Gladiators v Hampshire	Southampton	2014	
