= Tom Bailey (cricketer) =

English cricketer (born 1991)

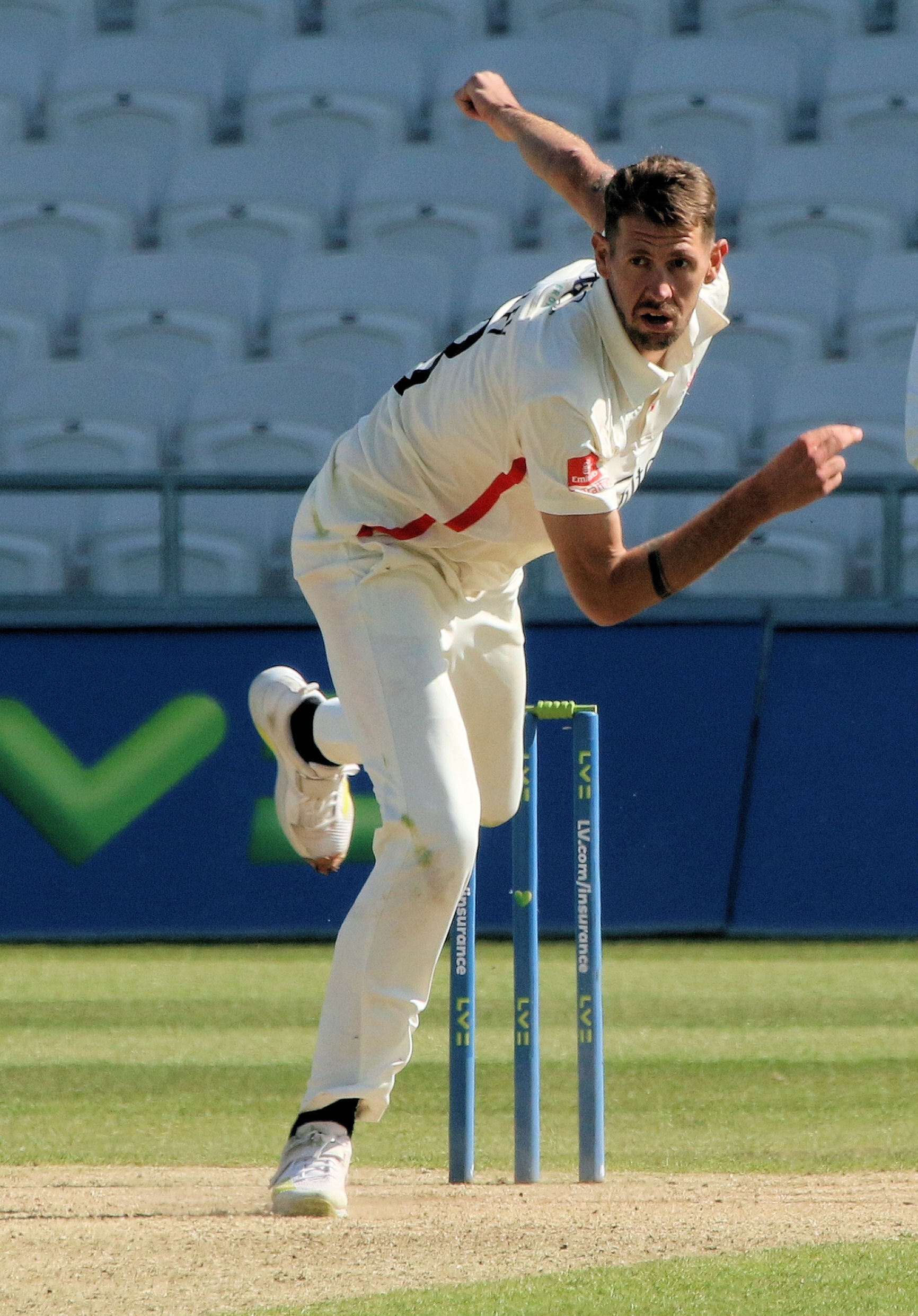
- Bailey in 2022

Personal information
- Full name: Tom Ernest Bailey
- Born: 21 April 1991 (age 35); Preston, Lancashire, England
- Batting: Right-handed
- Bowling: Right-arm fast-medium
- Role: Bowler

Domestic team information
- Years: Team
- 2012–present: Lancashire (squad no. 8)
- First-class debut: 11 September 2012 Lancashire v Surrey
- List A debut: 5 August 2014 Lancashire v Essex

Career statistics
Competition	FC	LA	T20
Matches	134	53	35
Runs scored	2,829	382	27
Batting average	18.25	17.36	4.50
100s/50s	0/11	0/1	0/0
Top score	78	60	10
Balls bowled	24,013	2,674	528
Wickets	458	67	31
Bowling average	25.17	33.80	26.16
5 wickets in innings	17	0	1
10 wickets in match	3	0	0
Best bowling	7/37	3/22	5/17
Catches/stumpings	29/–	10/–	10/–
- Source: ESPNcricinfo, 27 September 2026

Thomas Ernest Bailey (born 21 April 1991) is an English cricketer who plays for Lancashire. He made his first-class debut in 2012 and is a right-handed batsman who bowls right arm fast medium.

He was selected to tour with England Lions in 2019, but has not progressed to full international honours.

On 29 August 2020, in the 2020 t20 Blast fixture against Leicestershire, Bailey took his first five-wicket haul in a T20 match.

In September 2023 he extended his contract with Lancashire until the end of the 2026 season.
