= Andrew Hodd =

English cricketer

Andy Hodd
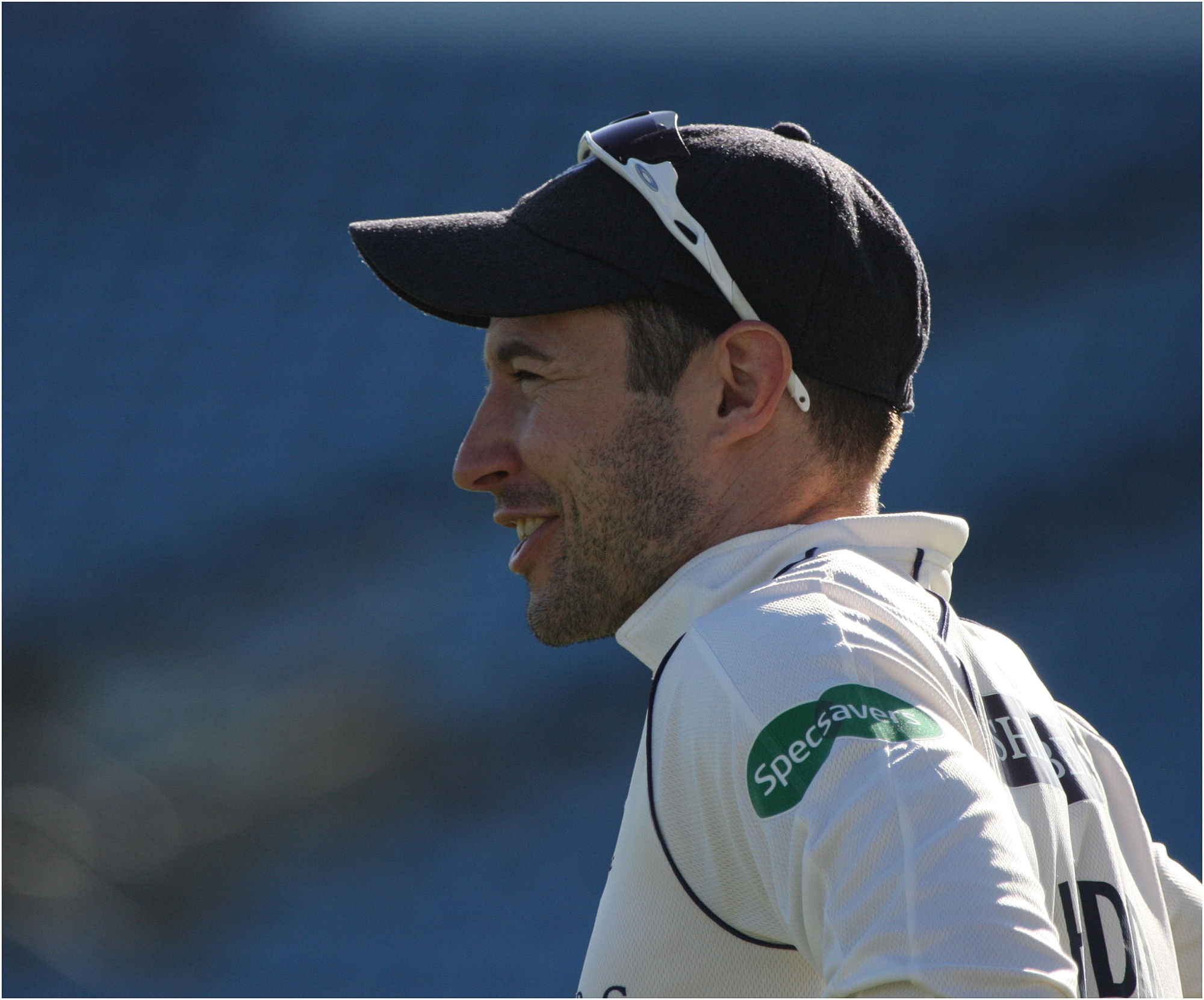
- Hodd in 2018

Personal information
- Full name: Andrew John Hodd
- Born: 12 January 1984 (age 42); Chichester, West Sussex, England
- Nickname: Hoddy
- Height: 5 ft 9 in (1.75 m)
- Batting: Right-handed
- Role: Wicket-keeper

Domestic team information
- Years: Team
- 2002: Sussex Cricket Board
- 2002–2003: Sussex
- 2005: Surrey
- 2006–2012: Sussex
- 2012–2018: Yorkshire (squad no. 4)
- FC debut: 15 May 2003 Sussex v Zimbabweans
- LA debut: 21 June 2002 Sussex v West Indies A

Career statistics
Competition	FC	LA	T20
Matches	114	74	73
Runs scored	3,809	934	400
Batting average	27.60	22.23	11.76
100s/50s	4/23	0/2	0/1
Top score	123	91	70
Balls bowled	16	–	–
Wickets	0	–	–
Bowling average	–	–	–
5 wickets in innings	–	–	–
10 wickets in match	–	–	–
Best bowling	–	–	–
Catches/stumpings	278/23	73/16	31/16
- Source: CricketArchive, 29 September 2018

Andrew John Hodd (born 12 January 1984) is a former English cricketer. He is a right-handed batsman and wicket-keeper, who ended his career playing for Yorkshire. He was born in Chichester.

He made his debut for Sussex in 2003, but moved to Surrey for two years to increase his playing chances. In 2006 he returned to Sussex.

Hodd has represented the English Under-19 cricket team.

In August 2012, Hodd was signed on loan by Yorkshire, to cover for Jonny Bairstow's regular absences with the England cricket team. At the end of the season, the move became permanent with Hodd signing a two-year deal with the club.

== Career best performances ==
as of 13 May 2021

	Batting			
	Score	Fixture	Venue	Season
FC	123	Sussex v Yorkshire	Hove	2007
LA	91	Sussex v Lancashire	Hove	2010
T20	70	Yorkshire v Nottinghamshire	Leeds	2015
