= List of Nottinghamshire County Cricket Club grounds =

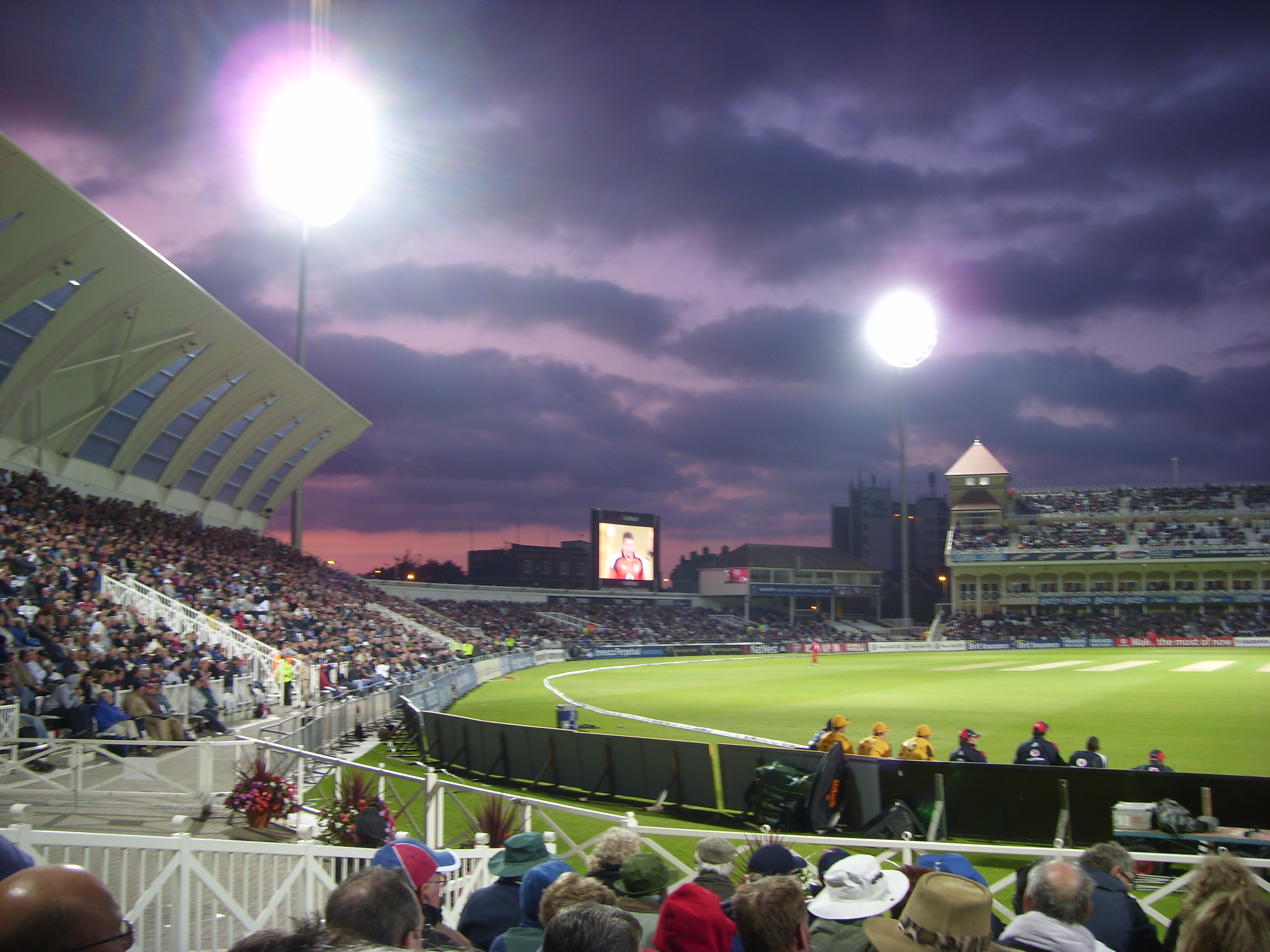
Trent Bridge hosted Nottinghamshire's debut home match in first-class cricket and remains the club's primary ground.

Nottinghamshire County Cricket Club is one of the 18 member clubs of the English County Championship, representing the historic county of Nottinghamshire, and also competes in major competitions in other formats of the game. Although there are records of a team competing as Nottinghamshire at an earlier date, the current club was established in 1841 and has competed in first-class cricket from 1841, List A cricket from 1963 and Twenty20 cricket from 2003.^{[A]} Unlike most professional sports, in which a team usually has a single fixed home ground, county cricket clubs have traditionally used different grounds in various towns and cities within or close to the county for home matches, although the use of minor "out grounds" away from the club's main headquarters has diminished since the 1980s. The Nottinghamshire team have played first class, List A, or Twenty20 matches at nine different grounds, although of these only one has hosted Twenty20 games.

The current Nottinghamshire club's debut home game in first-class cricket was played at Trent Bridge in Nottingham. The ground had been laid out in the 1830s by William Clarke, captain of the All-England Eleven, who was married to the landlady of the Trent Bridge Inn. Trent Bridge also played host to the club's first home fixtures in the other formats of the game; in List A cricket in 1965 against Wiltshire; and in Twenty20 cricket against Lancashire in 2003. The ground has also been used for matches not including Nottinghamshire, including extensively by England.

Other than a single match played in Newark-on-Trent in 1856 and two games played in Welbeck Abbey between 1901 and 1904, Trent Bridge was the home venue for all the county's first-class matches until the 1920s. In 1921 Nottinghamshire began to play at the Town Ground in Worksop, which was used for a single first-class match in most seasons until 1998, and also hosted three List A games between 1970 and 1980. From 1999 until 2014, the only ground used by the club other than Trent Bridge was the Sports Ground in Cleethorpes, which is not actually in Nottinghamshire but in the adjoining county of Lincolnshire. This ground hosted four first-class matches between 1980 and 1990, and five List A matches between 1983 and 2004. In 2015, Nottinghamshire played two List A matches at the John Fretwell Sporting Complex in Warsop, the first time they had played at a ground in their home county other than Trent Bridge for 17 years. The ground has continued to be used, and in 2019 hosted a first-class match for the first time.

== Grounds ==
Below is a complete list of grounds used by Nottinghamshire County Cricket Club for first-class, List A and Twenty20 matches. Statistics are complete through to the end of the 2020 season. Only matches played by Nottinghamshire CCC at the grounds since the establishment of the current county club in 1841 are recorded in the table. Matches abandoned without any play occurring are not included.

Name	Location	First-class			List A			Twenty20		
Name	Location	First	Last	Matches	First	Last	Matches	First	Last	Matches
Trent Bridge	Nottingham	26 August 1841 v Kent	6 September 2020 v Durham	1,520	1 May 1965 v Wiltshire	12 May 2019 v Kent	452	16 June 2003 v Lancashire	1 October 2020 v Leicestershire	110
Kelham Road	Newark-on-Trent	21 August 1856 v All-England Eleven	no other matches	1	–	–	0	–	–	0
Welbeck Abbey Cricket Ground	Welbeck Abbey	12 August 1901 v Derbyshire	28 July 1904 v Derbyshire	2	–	–	0	–	–	0
Town Ground	Worksop	20 July 1921 v Derbyshire	16 August 1998 v Leicestershire	47	26 July 1970 v Derbyshire	15 June 1980 v Northamptonshire	3	–	–	0
Steetley Company Ground	Shireoaks	5 July 1961 v Sussex	no other matches	1	–	–	0	–	–	0
Elm Avenue	Newark-on-Trent	6 July 1966 v Lancashire	12 July 1978 v Worcestershire	11	16 August 1970 v Somerset	8 May 1976 v Middlesex	4	–	–	0
John Player Ground	Nottingham	–	–	0	5 July 1970 v Hampshire	10 June 1973 v Gloucestershire	4	–	–	0
Sports Ground	Cleethorpes	20 August 1980 v Worcestershire	25 August 1990 v Sri Lankans	4	4 September 1983 v Middlesex	1 August 2004 v Durham	5^{[B]}	–	–	0
John Fretwell Sporting Complex	Warsop	9 June 2019 v Hampshire	no other matches	1	25 July 2015 v Warwickshire	20 May 2018 v Northamptonshire	5	–	–	0

== Notes ==
A. First-class cricket matches are designed to be contested over multiple days, with each team permitted two innings with no limit to the number of overs in an innings. List A matches, also known as limited overs or one-day matches, are intended to be completed in a single day and restrict each team to a single innings of between 40 and 60 overs, depending on the specific competition. Twenty20 matches restrict each team to a single innings of 20 overs.

B. Minor Counties North played a List A match at the Sports Ground in 1972. The match was against Nottinghamshire, but Minor Counties North were officially the home team. Only the List A matches played at the ground by Nottinghamshire in which they were the home team are included in the totals.
