= 2018 One-Day Cup =

2018 Royal London One-Day Cup
- Dates: 17 May – 30 June 2018
- Administrator: England and Wales Cricket Board
- Cricket format: Limited overs cricket (50 overs)
- Tournament format(s): Group stage and knockout
- Champions: Hampshire
- Participants: 18
- Matches: 77
- Most runs: Heino Kuhn (696)
- Most wickets: Matt Parkinson (18)
- Official website: ecb.co.uk

The 2018 Royal London One-Day Cup tournament was a limited overs cricket competition that formed part of the 2018 domestic cricket season in England and Wales. Matches were contested over 50 overs per side and have List A cricket status. All 18 first-class counties competed in the tournament, which ran from the middle of May until the end of June, when the final took place at Lord's Cricket Ground. Nottinghamshire were the defending champions of the tournament, having beaten Surrey in 2017 final.

== Format ==
The competition featured two groups of nine teams, based on a rough North–South geographical split. Each team played eight matches during the group stage, playing every other member of their group once, with four matches at home and four away. The group stage took place from the middle of May to the beginning of June, with the group winners progressing straight to the semi-finals and the second and third placed teams in each group playing a play-off against a team from the other group with the winner progressing to one of the semi-final matches. The only change for the 2018 competition from 2017 is the quarter-finals stage is renamed as the play-offs.

North Group	South Group
Derbyshire Falcons	Essex Eagles
Durham Jets	Glamorgan
Lancashire	Gloucestershire
Leicestershire Foxes	Hampshire
Northamptonshire Steelbacks	Kent Spitfires
Nottinghamshire Outlaws	Middlesex
Warwickshire Bears	Somerset
Worcestershire Rapids	Surrey
Yorkshire Vikings	Sussex Sharks

== North Group ==
=== Table ===
Pos	Team	Pld	W	L	T	NR	Ded	Pts	NRR
1	Worcestershire Rapids (Note: advanced directly to the semi-finals)	8	6	2	0	0	0	12	0.260
2	Nottinghamshire Outlaws (Note: advanced to the play-offs)	8	5	2	0	1	0	11	0.675
3	Yorkshire Vikings	8	5	2	0	1	0	11	0.513
4	Warwickshire Bears	8	4	2	0	2	0	10	0.446
5	Derbyshire Falcons	8	4	4	0	0	0	8	−0.552
6	Lancashire	8	3	4	0	1	0	7	0.969
7	Northamptonshire Steelbacks	8	2	5	0	1	0	5	−0.339
8	Leicestershire Foxes	8	2	6	0	0	0	4	−0.704
9	Durham Jets	8	2	6	0	0	0	4	−1.088

Source: Cricinfo

=== Fixtures ===
==== May ====
17 May 2018
11:00 BST
Scorecard

Leicestershire Foxes; 265/7 (50 overs)	v	Northamptonshire Steelbacks; 193 (38.2 overs)
Paul Horton 103 (125); Luke Procter 3/45 (8 overs)		Joshua Cobb 56 (64); Gavin Griffiths 4/30 (7 overs)

Leicestershire Foxes won by 72 runs
County Ground, Northampton

- Northamptonshire Steelbacks won the toss and chose to field.
- Points: Leicestershire Foxes 2, Northamptonshire Steelbacks 0.

17 May 2018
11:00 BST
Scorecard

Derbyshire Falcons; 357/8 (50 overs)	v	Warwickshire Bears; 300 (45.3 overs)
Billy Godleman 137 (116); Jonathan Trott 4/65 (10 overs)		Sam Hain 108 (101); Safyaan Sharif 2/31

Derbyshire Falcons won by 57 runs
Edgbaston, Birmingham

- Warwickshire Bears won the toss and chose to field.
- Ed Pollock (Warwickshire) made his List A debut.
- Points: Derbyshire Falcons 2, Warwickshire Bears 0.

17 May 2018
14:00 BST (D/N)
Scorecard

Nottinghamshire Outlaws; 318 (49.5 overs)	v	Lancashire; 309/9 (50 overs)
Steven Mullaney 70 (54); Matt Parkinson 5/68 (9.5 overs)		Keaton Jennings 136 (129); Harry Gurney 3/61 (10 overs)

Nottinghamshire Outlaws won by 9 runs
Old Trafford, Manchester

- Nottinghamshire Outlaws won the toss and chose to bat.
- William Fraine (Nottinghamshire Outlaws) made his List A debut.
- Points: Nottinghamshire Outlaws 2, Lancashire 0.

18 May 2018
14:00 BST (D/N)
Scorecard

Yorkshire Vikings; 328/4 (50 overs)	v	Durham Jets; 186 (40 overs)
Tom Kohler-Cadmore 164 (151); Matty Potts 3/69 (8 overs)		Michael Richardson 43(55); Adil Rashid 4/47 (10 overs)

Yorkshire Vikings won by 142 runs
Riverside Ground, Chester-le-Street

- Yorkshire Vikings win the toss and chose to bat.
- Matthew Potts (Durham Jets) made his List A debut.
- Points: Yorkshire Vikings 2, Durham Jets 0.

19 May 2018
11:00 BST
Scorecard

Worcestershire Rapids; 323/6 (50 overs)	v	Derbyshire Falcons; 273 (46.3 overs)
Ross Whiteley 58 (39); Alex Hughes 2/49 (9 overs)		Wayne Madsen 87 (70); Joe Leach 2/28 (6.3 overs)

Worcestershire Rapids won by 50 runs
New Road, Worcester

- Worcestershire Rapids won the toss and chose to bat.
- Points: Worcestershire Rapids 2, Derbyshire Falcons 0.

20 May 2018
11:00 BST
Scorecard

Lancashire; 313/7 (50 overs)	v	Durham Jets; 122 (31.1 overs)
Alex Davies 146 (136); Nathan Rimmington 3/64 (10 overs)		Tom Latham 26 (48); Tom Bailey 2/16 (5 overs)

Lancashire won by 192 runs
Old Trafford, Manchester

- Lancashire won the toss and chose to bat.
- Points: Lancashire 2, Durham Jets 0.

20 May 2018
11:00 BST
Scorecard

Nottinghamshire Outlaws; 339/9 (50 overs)	v	Northamptonshire Steelbacks; 290 (46.2 overs)
Josh Cobb 78 (89); Harry Gurney 2/57 (9 overs)		Steven Mullaney 71 (61); Graeme White 3/63 (10 overs)

Northamptonshire Steelbacks won by 49 runs
Welbeck Colliery Cricket Club Ground, Market Warsop

- Nottinghamshire Outlaws won the toss and chose to field.
- Points: Northamptonshire Steelbacks 2, Nottinghamshire Outlaws 0.

20 May 2018
11:00 BST
Scorecard

Yorkshire Vikings; 247/9 (50 overs)	v	Warwickshire Bears; 248/5 (45.4 overs)
Cheteshwar Pujara 73 (96); Jeetan Patel 4/33 (10 overs)		Sam Hain 102* (110); Ben Coad 2/40 (10 overs)

Warwickshire Bears won by 5 wickets
Headingley, Leeds

- Yorkshire Vikings won the toss and chose to bat.
- Henry Brookes (Warwickshire) made his List A debut.
- Points: Warwickshire Bears 2, Yorkshire Vikings 0.

23 May 2018
11:00 BST
Scorecard

Durham Jets; 272/8 (50 overs)	v	Derbyshire Falcons; 273/6 (49.4 overs)
Tom Latham 66 (81); Luis Reece 2/43 (9 overs)		Luis Reece 92 (107); Nathan Rimmington 3/36 (10 overs)

Derbyshire Falcons won by 4 wickets
County Ground, Derby

- Durham Jets won the toss and chose to bat.
- Points: Derbyshire Falcons 2, Durham Jets 0.

23 May 2018
11:00 BST
Scorecard

Nottinghamshire Outlaws; 409/7 (50 overs)	v	Leicestershire Foxes; 316/9 (50 overs)
Samit Patel 100 (63); Neil Dexter 2/50 (10 overs)		Tom Wells 69 (78); Harry Gurney 4/58 (10 overs)

Nottinghamshire Outlaws won by 93 runs
Grace Road, Leicester

- Leicestershire Foxes won the toss and chose to field.
- Points: Nottinghamshire Outlaws 2, Leicestershire Foxes 0.

23 May 2018
11:00 BST
Scorecard

Lancashire; 279/8 (50 overs)	v	Northamptonshire Steelbacks; 282/8 (49.5 overs)
Dane Vilas 83 (68); Steven Crook 2/27 (5 overs)		Richard Levi 90 (95); Matt Parkinson 2/34 (8.5 overs)

Northamptonshire Steelbacks won by 2 wickets
County Ground, Northampton

- Lancashire won the toss and chose to bat.
- Points: Lancashire 2, Northamptonshire Steelbacks 0.

23 May 2018
11:00 BST
Scorecard

Worcestershire Rapids; 350/6 (50 overs)	v	Yorkshire Vikings; 346/9 (50 overs)
Travis Head 77 (94); Steven Patterson 2/54 (10 overs)		Cheteshwar Pujara 101 (94); Ed Barnard 3/75 (10 overs)

Worcestershire Rapids won by 4 runs
Headingley, Leeds

- Yorkshire Vikings won the toss and chose to field
- Patrick Brown (Worcestershire Rapids) made his List A debut.
- Points: Worcestershire Rapids 2, Yorkshire Vikings 0.

25 May 2018
11:00 BST
Scorecard

Derbyshire Falcons; 211/9 (33 overs)	v	Leicestershire Foxes; 206/7 (33 overs)
Billy Godleman 64 (64); Varun Aaron 4/31 (7 overs)		Tom Wells 49* (28); Matthew Critchley 3/35 (6 overs)

Derbyshire Falcons won by 5 runs (D/L/S)
County Ground, Derby

- Leicestershire Foxes won the toss and chose to field.
- Rain delays reduced Derbyshire Falcons' and Leicestershire Foxes' innings to 33 overs.
- Points: Derbyshire Falcons 2, Leicestershire Foxes 0.

25 May 2018
11:00 BST
Scorecard

Durham Jets; 209 (45.2 overs)	v	Worcestershire Rapids; 82/4 (15 overs)
Michael Richardson 64 (88); Charles Morris 4/33 (8.2 overs)		Brett D'Oliveira 33* (33); Chris Rushworth 2/18 (6 overs)

Durham Jets won by 9 runs (D/L/S)
Roseworth Terrace, Gosforth

- Worcestershire Rapids won the toss and chose to field.
- Rain delays reduced Worcestershire's innings to 15 overs. Worcestershire's target was revised to 92.
- Gareth Harte (Durham Jets) made his List A debut.
- Points: Durham Jets 2, Worcestershire Rapids 0.

25 May 2018
11:00 BST
Scorecard

Lancashire; 50/1 (8.2 overs)	v	Warwickshire Bears
Keaton Jennings 23* (28); Henry Brookes 1/0 (0.2 overs)

No result
Stanley Park, Blackpool

- Warwickshire Bears won the toss and chose to field.
- Josh Bohannon (Lancashire) made his List A debut.
- Points: Lancashire 1, Warwickshire Bears 1.

25 May 2018
11:00 BST
Scorecard

Yorkshire Vikings	v	Nottinghamshire Outlaws

Match abandoned
Headingley, Leeds

- No toss.
- Match abandoned without a ball being bowled due to rain.
- Points: Yorkshire Vikings 1, Nottinghamshire Outlaws 1.

27 May 2018
11:00 BST
Scorecard

Leicestershire Foxes; 293/9 (50 overs)	v	Yorkshire Vikings; 295/1 (46.3 overs)
Mark Cosgrove 84 (88); Matthew Fisher 3/40 (10 overs)		Adam Lyth 132* (127); Cameron Delport 1/38 (5.3 overs)

Yorkshire Vikings won by 9 wickets
County Ground, Derby

- Leicestershire Foxes won the toss and chose to bat.
- Points: Yorkshire Vikings 2, Leicestershire Foxes 0.

27 May 2018
11:00 BST
Scorecard

Durham Jets; 256/7 (50 overs)	v	Northamptonshire Steelbacks; 251/9 (50 overs)
Tom Latham 86 (93); Graeme White 2/46 (8 overs)		Alex Wakely 79 (103); Matt Dixon 3/42 (10 overs)

Durham Jets won by 5 runs
County Ground, Northampton

- Northamptonshire Steelbacks won the toss and chose to field.
- Points: Durham Jets 2, Northamptonshire Steelbacks 0.

27 May 2018
11:00 BST
Scorecard

Warwickshire Bears; 295/9 (50 overs)	v	Nottinghamshire Outlaws; 187 (38.5 overs)
Sam Hain 72 (91); Matthew Carter 4/40 (10 overs)		Ross Taylor 56 (63); Aaron Thomason 4/46 (8 overs)

Warwickshire Bears won by 108 runs
Trent Bridge, Nottingham

- Warwickshire Bears won the toss and chose to bat.
- Matthew Carter and Jack Blatherwick (Nottinghamshire Outlaws) made their List A debuts.
- Points: Warwickshire Bears 2, Nottinghamshire Outlaws 0.

27 May 2018
11:00 BST
Scorecard

Lancashire; 254/9 (48 overs)	v	Worcestershire Rapids; 255/7 (47.5 overs)
Liam Livingstone 67 (70); Brett D'Oliveira 2/28 (10 overs)		Daryl Mitchell 102* (118); Joe Mennie 3/56 (9.5 overs)

Worcestershire Rapids won by 3 wickets
New Road, Worcester

- Worcestershire Rapids won the toss and chose to field.
- Rain delays reduced the match to 48 overs a team.
- Points: Worcestershire Rapids 2, Lancashire 0.

29 May 2018
11:00 BST
Scorecard

Leicestershire Foxes; 376/4 (50 overs)	v	Worcestershire Rapids; 380/4 (47.2 overs)
Ben Raine 83 (76); Ed Barnard 3/64 (10 overs)		Calum Ferguson 192 (143); Neil Dexter 1/36 (4 overs)

Worcestershire Rapids won by 6 wickets
New Road, Worcester

- Leicestershire Foxes won the toss and chose to bat.
- Points: Worcestershire Rapids 2, Leicestershire Foxes 0.

30 May 2018
11:00 BST
Scorecard

Derbyshire Falcons; 189/6 (24 overs)	v	Yorkshire Vikings; 192/6 (23.5 overs)
Ben Slater 109* (82); David Willey 4/47 (4 overs)		Tom Kohler-Cadmore 81 (63); Ravi Rampaul 5/48 (5 overs)

Yorkshire Vikings won by 2 wickets
County Ground, Derby

- Yorkshire Vikings won the toss and chose to field.
- Rain delays reduced the match to 24 overs a team.
- Points: Yorkshire Vikings 2, Derbyshire Falcons 0.

30 May 2018
14:00 BST
Scorecard

Northamptonshire Steelbacks	v	Warwickshire Bears

Match abandoned
Edgbaston, Birmingham

- Warwickshire Bears have won the toss and chose to field.
- Points: Warwickshire Bears 1, Northamptonshire Steelbacks 1.

31 May 2018
11:00 BST
Scorecard

Leicestershire Foxes; 172 (49 overs)	v	Lancashire; 175/1 (25.5 overs)
Mark Cosgrove 52 (68); Matt Parkinson 4/30 (10 overs)		Liam Livingstone 90* (56); Dieter Klein 1/32 (6 overs)

Lancashire won by 9 wickets
Oakham School Ground, Oakham

- Lancashire won the toss and chose to field.
- Rob Jones (Lancashire) made his List A debut.

==== June ====
1 June 2018
11:00 BST
Scorecard

Nottinghamshire Outlaws; 202 (45.1 overs)	v	Worcestershire Rapids; 164 (47.2 overs)
Riki Wessels 50 (52); Moeen Ali 4/33 (10 overs)		Daryl Mitchell 62 (99); Luke Fletcher 4/20 (9 overs)

Nottinghamshire Outlaws won by 38 runs
Trent Bridge, Nottingham

- Worcestershire Rapids won the toss and chose to field.
- Points: Nottinghamshire Outlaws 2, Worcestershire Rapids 0.

1 June 2018
14:00 BST (D/N)
Scorecard

Durham Jets; 299/8 (50 overs)	v	Warwickshire Bears; 300/5 (48.5 overs)
Will Smith 119 (110); Jeetan Patel 3/51 (10 overs)		Ian Bell 145* (144); Matt Dixon 2/71 (10 overs)

Warwickshire Bears won by 5 wickets
Riverside Ground, Chester-le-Street

- Warwickshire Bears won the toss and chose to field.
- Points: Warwickshire Bears 2, Durham Jets 0.

1 June 2018
14:00 BST (D/N)
Scorecard

Derbyshire Falcons; 265/2 (50 overs)	v	Northamptonshire Steelbacks; 214 (46 overs)
Billy Godleman 125* (142); Rory Kleinveldt 1/47 (10 overs)		Ben Duckett 57 (74); Duanne Olivier 3/31 (7 overs)

Derbyshire Falcons won by 51 runs
County Ground, Northampton

- Derbyshire Falcons won the toss and chose to bat.
- Callum Brodrick (Derbyshire Falcons) made his List A debut.
- Points: Derbyshire Falcons 2, Northamptonshire Steelbacks 0.

3 June 2018
11:00 BST
Scorecard

Lancashire; 290/8 (50 overs)	v	Derbyshire Falcons; 265/8 (50 overs)
Liam Livingstone 86 (73); Duanne Olivier 2/36 (9 overs)		Billy Godleman 75 (98); Stephen Parry 2/52 (9 overs)

Lancashire won by 25 runs
County Ground, Derby

- Derbyshire Falcons won the toss and chose to field.
- Points: Lancashire 2, Derbyshire Falcons 0.

3 June 2018
11:00 BST
Scorecard

Nottinghamshire Outlaws; 255 (49.4 overs)	v	Durham Jets; 224 (48 overs)
Steven Mullaney 124 (117); Chris Rushworth 3/39 (10 overs)		Michael Richardson 68 (99); Matthew Carter 4/47 (10 overs)

Nottinghamshire Outlaws won by 31 runs
Riverside Ground, Chester-le-Street

- Durham Jets won the toss and chose to field.
- Points: Nottinghamshire Outlaws 2, Durham Jets 0.

3 June 2018
11:00 BST
Scorecard

Leicestershire Foxes; 207 (43.1 overs)	v	Warwickshire Bears; 211/1 (37.4 overs)
Mark Cosgrove 60 (58); Olly Stone 3/44 (10 overs)		Jonathan Trott 102* (121); Zak Chappell 1/54 (8 overs)

Warwickshire Bears won by 9 wickets
Edgbaston, Birmingham

- Leicestershire Foxes won the toss and chose to bat.
- Points: Warwickshire Bears 2, Leicestershire Foxes 0.

3 June 2018
11:00 BST
Scorecard

Worcestershire Rapids; 348/5 (50 overs)	v	Northamptonshire Steelbacks; 314 (49.4 overs)
Callum Ferguson 159* (136); Graeme White 2/51 (10 overs)		Adam Rossington 63 (64); Charles Morris 2/39 (6.4 overs)

Worcestershire Rapids won by 34 runs
New Road, Worcester

- Worcestershire Rapids won the toss and chose to bat.
- Points: Worcestershire Rapids 2, Northamptonshire Steelbacks 0.

5 June 2018
11:00 BST
Scorecard

Yorkshire Vikings; 379/9 (50 overs)	v	Lancashire; 363 (49 overs)
Adam Lyth 144 (132); Matt Parkinson 2/71 (10 overs)		Liam Livingstone 79 (44); David Willey 4/59 (10 overs)

Yorkshire Vikings won by 16 runs
Old Trafford, Manchester

- Yorkshire Vikings won the toss and chose to bat.
- Points: Yorkshire Vikings 2, Lancashire 0

7 June 2018
14:00 BST (D/N)
Scorecard

Durham Jets; 240 (48.4 overs)	v	Leicestershire Foxes; 243/5 (44.2 overs)
Ryan Davies 61* (56); Zak Chappell 3/45 (10 overs)		Cameron Delport 122 (128); Graham Clark 3/18 (4 overs)

Leicestershire Foxes won by 5 wickets
Grace Road, Leicester

- Durham Jets won the toss and chose to bat.
- Harry Dearden and Harry Swindells (Leicestershire Foxes) both made their List A debuts.
- Points: Leicestershire Foxes 2, Durham Jets 0.

7 June 2018
14:00 BST (D/N)
Scorecard

Derbyshire Falcons; 110 (35 overs)	v	Nottinghamshire Outlaws; 115/2 (11.5 overs)
Wayne Madsen 37 (73); Jake Ball 4/29 (10 overs)		Riki Wessels 63 (34); Hardus Viljoen 1/14 (1.5 overs)

Nottinghamshire Outlaws won by 8 wickets
Trent Bridge, Nottingham

- Derbyshire Falcons won the toss and chose to bat.
- Points: Nottinghamshire Outlaws 2, Derbyshire Falcons 0.

7 June 2018
14:00 BST (D/N)
Scorecard

Warwickshire Bears; 292/7 (50 overs)	v	Worcestershire Rapids; 296/9 (45.4 overs)
Will Rhodes 69 (56); Moeen Ali 3/40 (10 overs)		Moeen Ali 114 (75); Olly Stone 4/71 (10 overs)

Worcestershire Rapids won by 1 wicket
Edgbaston, Birmingham

- Worcestershire Rapids won the toss and chose to field.
- Dillon Pennington (Worcestershire Rapids) made his List A debut.
- Points: Worcestershire Rapids 2, Warwickshire Bears 0.

7 June 2018
14:00 BST (D/N)
Scorecard

Northamptonshire Steelbacks; 241 (47.5 overs)	v	Yorkshire Vikings; 245/6 (49 overs)
Charlie Thurston 53 (62); David Willey 3/24 (9.5 overs)		David Willey 71 (90); Rob Keogh 2/26 (10 overs)

Yorkshire Vikings won by 4 wickets
Headingley, Leeds

- Northamptonshire Steelbacks won the toss and chose to bat.
- Charlie Thurston (Northamptonshire Steelbacks) made his List A debut.
- Points: Yorkshire Vikings 2, Northamptonshire Steelbacks 0.

== South Group ==
=== Table ===
Pos	Team	Pld	W	L	T	NR	Ded	Pts	NRR
1	Hampshire (Note: advanced directly to the semi-finals)	8	5	2	0	1	0	11	0.327
2	Essex Eagles (Note: advanced to the play-offs)	8	5	3	0	0	0	10	0.791
3	Kent Spitfires	8	5	3	0	0	0	10	0.010
4	Somerset	8	4	3	0	1	0	9	0.548
5	Surrey	8	4	3	0	1	0	9	−0.848
6	Middlesex	8	4	4	0	0	0	8	0.089
7	Gloucestershire	8	2	3	0	3	0	7	−0.250
8	Sussex Sharks	8	2	4	0	2	0	6	0.075
9	Glamorgan	8	1	7	0	0	0	2	−0.784

Source: Cricinfo

=== Fixtures ===
==== May ====
17 May 2018
11:00 BST
Scorecard

Kent Spitfires; 188 (43.3 overs)	v	Sussex Sharks; 189/3 (39.5 overs)
Daniel Bell-Drummond 90; Ollie Robinson 3/31 (7 overs)		Ben Brown 73*; Matt Henry 2/30 (8 overs)

Sussex Sharks won by 7 wickets
County Ground, Hove

- Kent Spitfires won the toss and chose to bat.
- Points: Sussex Sharks 2, Kent Spitfires 0.

17 May 2018
11:00 BST
Scorecard

Middlesex; 250 (48.3 overs)	v	Essex Eagles; 253/4 (42.4 overs)
Nick Gubbins 50 (52); Neil Wagner 3/40 (9.0 overs)		Tom Westley 134; Ravi Patel 3/41 (10 overs)

Essex Eagles won by 6 wickets
Brunton Memorial Ground, Radlett

- Middlesex won the toss and chose to bat.
- Stephen Eskinazi and Sam Cook (Essex Eagles) made their List A debuts.
- Points: Essex Eagles 2, Middlesex 0.

18 May 2018
11:00 BST
Scorecard

Glamorgan; 264 (49.3 overs)	v	Gloucestershire; 265/2 (48.2 overs)
Shaun Marsh 57 (71); Chris Liddle 4/60 (10 overs)		George Hankins 85 (114); Graham Wagg 1/36 (10 overs)

Gloucestershire won by 8 wickets
Sophia Gardens, Cardiff
Umpires: Alex Wharf and Mike Burns

- Glamorgan won the toss and chose to bat.
- Points: Gloucestershire 2, Glamorgan 0.

18 May 2018
11:00 BST
Scorecard

Surrey; 129 (35.2 overs)	v	Somerset; 131/2 (21.3 overs)
Sam Curran 30 (45); Craig Overton 4/27 (9.2 overs)		Johann Myburgh 75 (65); Sam Curran 2/37 (6 overs)

Somerset won by 8 wickets
The Oval, London

- Somerset won the toss and decided to field.
- Will Jacks (Surrey) and Tom Banton (Somerset) made their List A debuts.
- Points: Somerset 2, Surrey 0.

19 May 2018
11:00 BST
Scorecard

Sussex Sharks; 250 (49.3 overs)	v	Hampshire; 253/8 (49.2 overs)
Harry Finch 108 (142); Gareth Berg 3/51 (10 overs)		Gareth Berg 65 (37); David Wiese 3/46 (10 overs)

Hampshire won by 2 wickets
County Ground, Hove

- Sussex Sharks won the toss and chose to bat.
- Points: Hampshire 2, Sussex Sharks 0.

20 May 2018
11:00 BST
Scorecard

Essex Eagles; 287/7 (50 overs)	v	Gloucestershire; 289/6 (48.1 overs)
Ashar Zaidi 82 (77); Chris Liddle 4/57 (10 overs)		Gareth Roderick 87 (89); Simon Harmer 2/60 (10 overs)

Gloucestershire won by 4 wickets
County Ground, Bristol

- Essex Eagles won the toss and chose to bat.
- Points: Gloucestershire 2, Essex Eagles 0.

20 May 2018
11:00 BST
Scorecard

Middlesex; 313/9 (50 overs)	v	Kent Spitfires; 243 (43.5 overs)
Paul Stirling 125 (115); Calum Haggett 3/59 (9 overs)		Heino Kuhn 90 (92); Tom Helm 4/49 (7 overs)

Middlesex won by 70 runs
Brunton Memorial Ground, Radlett

- Middlesex won the toss and chose to bat.
- Points: Middlesex 2, Kent Spitfires 0.

20 May 2018
11:00 BST
Scorecard

Somerset; 372/7 (50 overs)	v	Glamorgan; 289 (46 overs)
James Hildreth 159 (123); Lukas Carey 2/57 (10 overs)		Colin Ingram 85 (70); Peter Trego 2/53 (8 overs)

Somerset won by 83 runs
County Ground, Taunton
Umpires: Jeremy Lloyds and Russell Warren

- Glamorgan won the toss and chose to field.
- James Hildreth (Somerset) scored a career-best total of 159.
- Points: Somerset 2, Glamorgan 0.

21 May 2018
14:00 BST (D/N)
Scorecard

Surrey; 262/7 (44 overs)	v	Hampshire; 227/6 (32.5 overs)
Dean Elgar 91 (91); Mason Crane 3/45 (8 overs)		Rilee Rossouw 90 (68); Rikki Clarke 4/48 (7 overs)

Hampshire won by 4 wickets (D/L/S)
Rose Bowl, Southampton

- Surrey won the toss and chose to bat.
- Rain delays reduced Surrey's innings to 44 overs and Hampshire's innings to 34 overs; Hampshire's target was revised to 227.
- Points: Hampshire 2, Surrey 0.

22 May 2018
11:00 BST
Scorecard

Sussex Sharks; 341/7 (50 overs)	v	Somerset; 266 (42.5 overs)
Luke Wright 105 (87); Max Waller 3/52 (10 overs)		James Hildreth 87 (97); Ishant Sharma 3/47 (7.5 overs)

Sussex Sharks won by 75 runs
County Ground, Taunton

- Sussex Sharks won the toss and chose to bat.
- Points: Sussex Sharks 2, Somerset 0.

23 May 2018
11:00 BST
Scorecard

Essex Eagles; 303/6 (50 overs)	v	Hampshire; 304/4 (47.2 overs)
Adam Wheater 70 (69); Bradley Wheal 2/71 (10 overs)		Rilee Rossouw 111 (111); Ravi Bopara 3/49 (9 overs)

Hampshire won by 6 wickets
Rose Bowl, Southampton

- Hampshire won the toss and chose to field.
- Points: Hampshire 2, Essex Eagles 0.

23 May 2018
11:00 BST
Scorecard

Gloucestershire; 282/6 (50 overs)	v	Surrey; 286/4 (45.4 overs)
Ryan Higgins 81* (70); Scott Borthwick 2/51 (8 overs)		Will Jacks 121 (100); Benny Howell 1/32 (10 overs)

Surrey won by 6 wickets
The Oval, London

- Surrey won the toss and chose to field.
- Points: Surrey 2, Gloucestershire 0.

23 May 2018
14:00 BST (D/N)
Scorecard

Middlesex; 304/6 (50 overs)	v	Glamorgan; 302/9 (50 overs)
James Franklin 62* (50); Colin Ingram 3/24 (7 overs)		David Lloyd 62 (75); Ravi Patel 3/58 (10 overs)

Middlesex won by 2 runs
Sophia Gardens, Cardiff
Umpires: Alex Wharf and Nick Cook
Player of the match: James Franklin (Middlesex)

- Glamorgan won the toss and chose to field.
- Points: Middlesex 2, Glamorgan 0.

25 May 2018
11:00 BST
Scorecard

Glamorgan; 274 (49.3 overs)	v	Kent Spitfires; 278/6 (48.1 overs)
Nick Selman 92 (125); Joe Denly 4/56 (10 overs)		Joe Denly 150* (143); Ruaidhri Smith 2/41 (9 overs)

Kent Spitfires won by 4 wickets
St Lawrence Ground, Canterbury
Umpires: Ben Debenham and Michael Gough

- Kent Spitfires won the toss and chose to field.
- Points: Kent Spitfires 2, Glamorgan 0.

25 May 2018
11:00 BST
Scorecard

Middlesex; 288/4 (50 overs)	v	Sussex Sharks; 214 (43.5 overs)
Paul Stirling 116 (129); Danny Briggs 2/65 (10 overs)		David Wiese 57 (52); Ravi Patel 4/58 (10 overs)

Middlesex won by 74 runs
County Ground, Hove

- Sussex Sharks won the toss and chose to field.
- Points: Middlesex 2, Sussex Sharks 0.

25 May 2018
14:00 BST (D/N)
Scorecard

Essex Eagles; 313 (49.3 overs)	v	Somerset; 273 (48.1 overs)
Varun Chopra 160 (149); Tim Groenewald 3/43 (10 overs)		Roelof van der Merwe 61 (54); Shane Snater 5/60 (8.1 overs)

Essex Eagles won by 40 runs
County Ground, Chelmsford

- Somerset won the toss and chose to field.
- Points: Essex Eagles 2, Somerset 0.

25 May 2018
14:00 BST (D/N)
Scorecard

Gloucestershire	v	Hampshire

Match abandoned
County Ground, Bristol

- No toss.
- Match abandoned without toss due to rain.
- Points: Gloucestershire 1, Hampshire 1.

27 May 2018
11:00 BST
Scorecard

Essex Eagles; 294/9 (50 overs)	v	Surrey; 295/4 (45 overs)
Ravi Bopara 74 (71); Rikki Clarke 3/59 (10 overs)		Dean Elgar 87 (95); Ryan ten Doeschate 1/5 (2 overs)

Surrey won by 6 wickets
County Ground, Chelmsford

- Surrey won the toss and chose to field.
- Points: Surrey 2, Essex Eagles 0.

27 May 2018
11:00 BST
Scorecard

Gloucestershire	v	Sussex Sharks

Match abandoned
County Ground, Bristol

- No toss.
- Match abandoned without toss due to wet outfield.
- Points: Gloucestershire 1, Sussex Sharks 1.

27 May 2018
11:00 BST
Scorecard

Kent Spitfires; 296/4 (50 overs)	v	Hampshire; 295/5 (50 overs)
Daniel Bell-Drummond 82 (111); Brad Taylor 2/35 (10 overs)		Joe Weatherley 105* (112); Darren Stevens 2/48 (10 overs)

Kent Spitfires won by 1 run
Rose Bowl, Southampton

- Hampshire won the toss and chose to field.
- Points: Kent Spitfires 2, Hampshire 0.

27 May 2018
11:00 BST
Scorecard

Somerset; 283 (48.3 overs)	v	Middlesex; 230 (40.1 overs)
Peter Trego 65 (85); Steven Finn 4/65 (9.3 overs)		John Simpson 77 (76); Paul van Meekeren 3/32 (7.1 overs)

Somerset won by 53 runs
County Ground, Taunton

- Middlesex won the toss and chose to field.
- Wet outfield reduced the match to 49 overs a team.
- Points: Somerset 2, Middlesex 0.

29 May 2018
11:00 BST
Scorecard

Surrey	v	Sussex Sharks

Match abandoned
The Oval, London

- Sussex Sharks won the toss and chose to field.
- Points: Surrey 1, Sussex 1.

29 May 2018
14:00 BST (D/N)
Scorecard

Somerset; 221/9 (42 overs)	v	Kent Spitfires; 88/1 (16 overs)
Lewis Gregory 60 (61); Matt Henry 3/37 (9 overs)		Joe Denly 44* (53); Lewis Gregory 1/19 (4 overs)

Kent Spitfires won by 28 runs (D/L/S)
St Lawrence Ground, Canterbury

- Kent Spitfires won the toss and chose to field.
- Wet outfield reduced Somerset's and Kent Spitfires' innings to 42 and 16 overs respectively.
- Ben Green (Somerset) made his List A debut.
- Points: Kent Spitfires 2, Somerset 0.

30 May 2018
11:00 BST
Scorecard

Glamorgan; 200 (48.3 overs)	v	Essex Eagles; 201/1 (31.3 overs)
Chris Cooke 59 (75); Jamie Porter 4/29 (10 overs)		Varun Chopra 98* (84); Andrew Salter 1/44 (7 overs)

Essex Eagles won by 9 wickets
County Ground, Chelmsford
Umpires: Alex Wharf and Paul Baldwin

- Essex Eagles won the toss and chose to field.
- Connor Brown (Glamorgan) made his List A debut.
- Points: Essex Eagles 2, Glamorgan 0.

30 May 2018
11:00 BST
Scorecard

Middlesex; 199/8 (45 overs)	v	Hampshire; 200/5 (38.4 overs)
Stevie Eskinazi 42(63); Reece Topley 4/40 (9 overs)		James Vince 56* (70); Nathan Sowter 2/37 (9 overs)

Hampshire won by 5 wickets
Merchant Taylors' School, Northwood

- Middlesex won the toss and chose to bat.
- Wet outfield reduced the match to 45 overs per side.
- Points: Hampshire 2, Middlesex 0.

==== June ====
1 June 2018
11:00 BST
Scorecard

Sussex Sharks; 277/8 (50 overs)	v	Glamorgan; 281/4 (48.2 overs)
David Wiese 67 (61); Timm van der Gugten 3/58 (10 overs)		Colin Ingram 95* (86); Chris Jordan 2/55 (10 overs)

Glamorgan won by 6 wickets
Sophia Gardens, Cardiff
Umpires: Mike Burns and Neil Mallender

- Glamorgan won the toss and chose to field.
- Points: Glamorgan 2, Sussex Sharks 0

1 June 2018
11:00 BST
Scorecard

Kent Spitfires; 384/8 (50 overs)	v	Surrey; 164 (30.1 overs)
Heino Kuhn 117 (112); Tom Curran 4/75 (10 overs)		Jason Roy 68 (56); Darren Stevens 6/25 (6.1 overs)

Kent Spitfires won by 220 runs
County Ground, Beckenham

- Surrey won the toss and chose to field.
- Points: Kent Spitfires 2, Surrey 0.

1 June 2018
11:00 BST
Scorecard

Somerset; 211 (40.1 overs)	v	Gloucestershire; 39/0 (6 overs)
Peter Trego 74 (63); Craig Miles 3/31 (6.1 overs)		Chris Dent 29* (27)

No result
County Ground, Taunton

- Gloucestershire won the toss and chose to field.
- Rain led to Gloucestershire innings being incomplete at 6 overs.
- Points: Somerset 2, Gloucestershire 0.

3 June 2018
11:00 BST
Scorecard

Glamorgan; 227 (48.4 overs)	v	Hampshire; 229/6 (43.2 overs)
Colin Ingram 64 (66); Mason Crane 4/46 (10 overs)		Brad Taylor 54* (80); Graham Wagg 2/33 (6 overs)

Hampshire won by 4 wickets
St. Helen's, Swansea
Umpires: Richard Illingworth and Steve O'Shaughnessy

- Hampshire won the toss and chose to field.
- Points: Hampshire 2, Glamorgan 0.

3 June 2018
11:00 BST
Scorecard

Gloucestershire; 322/8 (50 overs)	v	Kent Spitfires; 323/3 (46.3 overs)
George Hankins 92 (120); Darren Stevens 2/43 (10 overs)		Heino Kuhn 113 (102); Craig Miles 2/73 (9 overs)

Kent Spitfires won by 7 wickets
County Ground, Beckenham

- Gloucestershire won the toss and chose to bat.
- Points: Kent Spitfires 2, Gloucestershire 0.

3 June 2018
11:00 BST
Scorecard

Middlesex; 234 (50 overs)	v	Surrey; 238/5 (48.1 overs)
Paul Stirling 67 (93); Tom Curran 4/33 (10 overs)		Ben Foakes 86 (116); Steven Finn 2/53 (8.1 overs)

Surrey won by 5 wickets
Lord's, London

- Middlesex won the toss and chose to bat.
- Points: Surrey 2, Middlesex 0.

3 June 2018
11:00 BST
Scorecard

Sussex Sharks; 281/7 (50 overs)	v	Essex Eagles; 285/6 (48 overs)
Laurie Evans 107* (117); Ashar Zaidi 2/32 (10 overs)		Tom Westley 88 (89); Jofra Archer 2/53 (10 overs)

Essex Eagles won by 4 wickets
The Saffrons, Eastbourne

- Essex Eagles won the toss and chose to field.
- Points: Essex Eagles 2, Sussex Sharks 0.

6 June 2018
14:00 BST (D/N)
Scorecard

Essex Eagles; 337/7 (50 overs)	v	Kent Spitfires; 184 (37.5 overs)
Ravi Bopara 125 (88); Mitchell Claydon 2/75 (10 overs)		Sean Dickson 51 (66); Jamie Porter 4/37 (9 overs)

Essex Eagles won by 153 runs
County Ground, Chelmsford

- Kent Spitfires won the toss and chose to field.
- Points: Essex Eagles 2, Kent Spitfires 0.

6 June 2018
14:00 BST (D/N)
Scorecard

Middlesex; 322/3 (50 overs)	v	Gloucestershire; 289 (48.3 overs)
Paul Stirling 127* (143); Ryan Higgins 1/54 (10 overs)		Ian Cockbain 106* (112); James Franklin 3/42 (9 overs)

Middlesex won by 33 runs
County Ground, Bristol

- Gloucestershire won the toss and chose to field.
- George Drissell (Gloucestershire) made his List A debut.
- Points: Middlesex 2, Gloucestershire 0.

6 June 2018
14:00 BST (D/N)
Scorecard

Hampshire; 356/9 (50 overs)	v	Somerset; 360/7 (50 overs)
James Vince 109 (93); Craig Overton 3/69 (10 overs)		Peter Trego 100 (101); Liam Dawson 2/52 (8 overs)

Somerset won by 3 wickets
Rose Bowl, Southampton

- Hampshire won the toss and chose to bat.
- Points: Somerset 2, Hampshire 0.

6 June 2018
14:00 BST (D/N)
Scorecard

Glamorgan; 266/8 (50 overs)	v	Surrey; 269/5 (40.4 overs)
Connor Brown 98 (136); Rikki Clarke 3/49 (10 overs)		Will Jacks 80 (57); Andrew Salter 2/50 (10 overs)

Surrey won by 5 wickets
The Oval, London
Umpires: Nigel Llong and Tim Robinson

- Surrey won the toss and chose to field.
- Points: Surrey 2, Glamorgan 0.

== Knockout stage ==
The winner of each group progressed straight to the semi-finals with the second and third placed teams playing a play-off match against a team from the other group which made up the play-offs. The winner of each play-off played one of the group winners in the semi-finals. The final took place at Lord's on 30 June 2018, with Hampshire defeating Kent Spitfires by 61 runs.

Play-offs
N2	Nottinghamshire Outlaws	255/8
S3	Kent Spitfires	257/1
S2	Essex Eagles	234
N3	Yorkshire Vikings	259/7

Semi-finals
N1	Worcestershire Rapids	306/6
S3	Kent Spitfires	307/8
S1	Hampshire	348/9
N3	Yorkshire Vikings	241

Final
S1	Hampshire	330/7
S3	Kent Spitfires	269

=== Play-offs ===
14 June 2018
11:00 BST
Scorecard

Nottinghamshire Outlaws; 255/8 (50 overs)	v	Kent Spitfires; 257/1 (35.5 overs)
Steven Mullaney 90 (108); Harry Podmore 4/57 (10 overs)		Heino Kuhn 124* (114); Matt Carter 1/57 (6 overs)

Kent Spitfires won by 9 wickets
Trent Bridge, Nottingham

- Kent Spitfires won the toss and chose to field.

14 June 2018
14:00 BST (D/N)
Scorecard

Essex Eagles; 234 (49.1 overs)	v	Yorkshire Vikings; 259/7 (50 overs)
Adam Wheater 78 (70); Steven Patterson 4/36 (10 overs)		Gary Ballance 91 (113); Jamie Porter 3/25 (9 overs)

Yorkshire Vikings won by 25 runs
County Ground, Chelmsford

- Yorkshire Vikings won the toss and chose to bat.

=== Semi-finals ===
17 June 2018
11:00 BST
Scorecard

Worcestershire Rapids; 306/6 (50 overs)	v	Kent Spitfires; 307/8 (49.4 overs)
Ben Cox 122 (106); Darren Stevens 2/33 (10 overs)		Heino Kuhn 127 (118); Patrick Brown 3/53 (7.4 overs)

Kent Spitfires won by 2 wickets
New Road, Worcester

- Worcestershire Rapids won the toss and chose to bat.

18 June 2018
11:00 BST
Scorecard

Hampshire; 348/9 (50 overs)	v	Yorkshire Vikings; 241 (43.4 overs)
James Vince 171 (160); Ben Coad 2/48 (9 overs)		Jonny Tattersall 89 (114); Liam Dawson 4/47 (10 overs)

Hampshire won by 107 runs
Rose Bowl, Southampton

- Yorkshire Vikings won the toss and chose to field.

=== Final ===
30 June 2018
11:00 BST
Scorecard

Hampshire; 330/7 (50 overs)	v	Kent Spitfires; 269 (47.1 overs)
Rilee Rossouw 125 (114); Joe Denly 4/57 (10 overs)		Daniel Bell-Drummond 86 (89); Gareth Berg 2/43 (9.1 overs)

Hampshire won by 61 runs
Lord's, London

- Kent Spitfires won the toss and chose to field.
- Hampshire's 330/7 was the highest total scored in any domestic One Day Final at Lord's.

== Statistics ==
=== Highest score by a team ===
Score	Team	Opposition	Ground
409/7	Nottinghamshire Outlaws	Leicestershire Foxes	Grace Road, Leicester
384/8	Kent Spitfires	Surrey	The Kent County Cricket Ground, Beckenham
380/4	Worcestershire Rapids	Leicestershire Foxes	New Road, Worcester

=== Lowest score by a team ===
Score	Team	Opposition	Ground
110	Derbyshire Falcons	Nottinghamshire Outlaws	Trent Bridge, Nottingham
122	Durham Jets	Lancashire Lightning	Old Trafford, Manchester
129	Surrey	Somerset	The Oval, London

=== Top score by an individual ===
Score	Player	Team	Opposition	Ground
192	Callum Ferguson	Worcestershire Rapids	Leicestershire Foxes	New Road, Worcester
171	James Vince	Hampshire	Yorkshire Vikings	Rose Bowl, Southampton
164	Tom Kohler-Cadmore	Yorkshire Vikings	Durham Jets	Riverside Ground, Chester-le-Street

=== Best bowling figures by an individual ===
BBI	Player	Team	Opposition	Ground
6/25	Darren Stevens	Kent Spitfires	Surrey	The Kent County Cricket Ground, Beckenham
5/48	Ravi Rampaul	Derbyshire Falclons	Yorkshire Vikings	County Ground, Derby
5/60	Shane Snater	Essex Eagles	Somerset	County Ground, Chelmsford

=== Most runs ===
Player	Team	Matches	Innings	Runs	Average	HS	100s	50s
Heino Kuhn	Kent	11	11	696	87.00	127	4	1
Varun Chopra	Essex	9	9	528	66.00	160	1	3
James Vince	Hampshire	9	9	527	58.55	171	2	2
Paul Stirling	Middlesex	8	8	515	73.57	127*	3	1
Billy Godleman	Derbyshire	8	8	509	72.71	137	2	3

As of 30 June 2018 — Source: Cricinfo

=== Most wickets ===
Players	Team	Matches	Overs	Wickets	Average	BBI	4w	5w
Matt Parkinson	Lancashire	8	63.4	18	18.22	5/68	1	1
Darren Stevens	Kent	11	93.1	16	26.31	6/25	0	1
Ed Barnard	Worcestershire	9	75.0	16	28.87	3/64	0	0
Matt Henry	Kent	11	99.1	16	34.43	3/37	0	0
Ravi Patel	Middlesex	8	77.0	15	25.20	4/58	1	0

As of 30 June 2018 — Source: Cricinfo
