= 2018 English cricket season =

County Championship
- Champions: Surrey
- Runners-up: Somerset
- Most runs: RJ Burns (1,359)
- Most wickets: MJ Henry (75)

Royal London One-Day Cup
- Champions: Hampshire
- Runners-up: Kent
- Most runs: HG Kuhn (696)
- Most wickets: MW Parkinson (18)

t20 Blast
- Champions: Worcestershire
- Runners-up: Sussex
- Most runs: LJ Evans (614)
- Most wickets: PR Brown (31)

Women's Cricket Super League
- Champions: Surrey Stars
- Runners-up: Loughborough Lightning
- Most runs: SS Mandhana (421)
- Most wickets: KL Gordon (17)

Women's County Championship
- Champions: Hampshire
- Runners-up: Yorkshire
- Most runs: SW Bates (358)
- Most wickets: KL Gordon (23)

Women's Twenty20 Cup
- Champions: Middlesex
- Runners-up: Sussex
- Most runs: K Hassall (311)
- Most wickets: PAC Cowdrill (15); RH Silk (15)

PCA Player of the Year
- JL Denly

Wisden Cricketers of the Year
- Shai Hope, Heather Knight, Jamie Porter, Natalie Sciver, Anya Shrubsole

The 2018 English cricket season ran between 1 April and 27 September 2018 and was the 119th in which the County Championship has been an official competition. It featured first-class, one-day and Twenty20 cricket competitions throughout England and Wales.

The season saw men's international tours by Pakistan, Australia and India, with Pakistan and India playing Test matches against England. The South African and New Zealand women's teams also toured England, each playing three One Day International matches against the England women's cricket team. The three teams also competed in the 2018 England women's Tri-Nation Series Twenty20 competition.

The 18 first-class counties competed in the 2018 County Championship, One-Day Cup and T20 Blast competitions, whilst women's teams played in the 2018 Women's Cricket Super League, 2018 Women's County Championship and the 2018 Women's Twenty20 Cup. The 2018 Minor Counties Championship, MCCA Knockout Trophy and a new Twenty20 competition were competed for by the Minor Counties of England and Wales, and club cricket was played throughout both countries.

== International tours ==
Three men's international teams toured England and Wales during the season: Pakistan, Australia and India. Pakistan also visited Ireland midway through the tour and played the Irish team's first Test match at Malahide near Dublin. In preparation for this match the Irish team played a first-class match against Somerset at Taunton in April. At the end of their tour Pakistan played two T20 matches in Scotland on 12 and 13 June. The England team played a One Day International (ODI) against Scotland in Edinburgh in June, losing to Scotland for the first time in an ODI.

The South African women's team also toured England to play three One Day International matches against the England women's cricket team in June and to compete in the 2018 England women's Tri-Nation Series Twenty20 competition against England and New Zealand. New Zealand then played three One Day Internationals against England in July.

In addition the West Indies men's team played a single Twenty20 International against a Rest of the World XI team at Lord's in May 2018 to raise funds for stadiums damaged by Hurricane Irma and Hurricane Maria in September 2017.

=== Pakistan tour ===
Pakistan played two Test matches against England at Lord's and Headingley at the end of May and beginning of June. The series was drawn, each team winning one match.

Ahead of the Tests, two first-class matches were played against Kent and Northants. Their match against Ireland took place after the two first-class county matches, and a two-day match was played against Leicestershire between this and the first Test against England.

Pakistan won the first Test match by nine wickets on the fourth morning, playing "superbly but unspectacularly" to beat England comprehensively. The match was the first time England had lost the opening Test match of an English summer in 23 seasons. The BBC's cricket correspondent Jonathan Agnew called England's performance "truly dreadful" and was shocked that England could be "outplayed so comprehensively by a touring team at home in May" whist praising Pakistan as looking "sharper, better drilled and more prepared". Pakistan's "focus on basics", coaching and management were praised by The Express Tribune, whilst former Pakistan bowler Waqar Younis claimed that the win was his country's best at Lord's. Writing on CricInfo, George Dobell's view was that England's defeat was the "culmination of several years' of ECB policies that have disrespected Test cricket".

England won the second Test within three days, defeating Pakistan by an innings and 55 runs in an "emphatic victory".

=== South Africa women tour ===
South Africa women played three ODIs against England during June with England winning the series 2–1, their ninth consecutive series win against South Africa. The matches formed part of the qualification process for the next World Cup

South Africa won the first match at Worcester by seven wickets before England levelled the series at Hove after scoring 331 runs. The final match saw another strong England batting performance at Canterbury with Tammy Beaumont scoring her second century of the series as England won by seven wickets. Beaumont was named as player of the series.

=== England in Scotland ===
England played a single ODI against Scotland at The Grange Club in Edinburgh on 10 June. The Scotland team scored 371/5 and bowled England out for 365 to win by six runs, the first time they had beaten England in an ODI. The Scottish score was the highest made by an Associate team against a Full Member team and included a score of 140 not out from Calum MacLeod. Despite a century from Jonny Bairstow, England fell short of what would have been their highest ODI run chase. The match was the England team's only away fixture during the 2018 English season.

=== Australia tour ===
Australia played a series of five One Day International matches and a single T20 International against England in June. England won the ODI series 5–0, the first time they had achieved a 5–0 victory against Australia in an ODI series, and also won the T20I match. The series featured a world record score of 481/6 made by England in the third match of the series, a game they won by 242 runs, with Alex Hales and Jonny Bairstow both scoring centuries.

Australia played two warm-up one-day matches against Sussex and Middlesex at the start of June, winning both. After England achieved an "ugly win" in the first match of the series at The Oval strong batting performances saw them win the next three matches, including chasing a target of 311 runs in the fourth match, their highest run chase against Australia. The final match was closer, England eventually chasing Australia's score of 205 to win by one wicket, having been 114/8 in 29.4 overs at one point.

=== Tri-Nation series ===
The England, South Africa and New Zealand women's teams competed in a three-way T20I competition between 20 June and 1 July. England won the final of the series, which was played at Chelmsford, defeating New Zealand.

The series featured seven matches, six played on a round-robin basis in June with England and New Zealand, the most successful two teams, playing a final on 1 July. The series featured three days of round-robin matches, each with two matches played back-to-back. Four of the fixtures were played at Taunton and two at Bristol. The series followed the ODIs played by South Africa against England and were followed by an ODI series played between England and New Zealand.

=== India tour ===
India toured England between July and September, playing five Test matches, three ODIs and three T20Is against England. The T20I series was won 2–1 by India, with the ODI series being won by England by the same margin.

Ahead of the Test matches, which were played in August and September, one first-class match was played against Essex. Before arriving in England, India played two T20Is against Ireland at Malahide, winning both.

England won the Test series 4–1, winning the first two Test matches of the series before India won the third. England sealed the series with a victory in the fourth Test at Southampton, with India unable to chase a target of less than 250 runs in their second innings, before winning the final Test in September.

=== New Zealand women tour ===
After a series of matches against Ireland in early June and the tri-series in July, New Zealand women played a set of three ODIs against England, with England winning the series 2–1. The matches formed part of the qualification process for the next World Cup.

== Domestic cricket ==
=== MCCU matches ===
The season began on 1 April with the first of three rounds of matches between first-class counties and the six Marylebone Cricket Club University teams. Each first-class county played one first-class match against a university team before the start of the County Championship season later in the month, although a number of the matches were abandoned due to rain or wet outfields.

=== County Championship ===
The men's County Championship season began on 13 April and was completed on 27 September with each team playing 14 matches. Each county will play one day/night match spread over four rounds of the competition from June to August. Surrey won their first Championship since 2002 with two rounds of matches left in the season.

The runners-up in Division One were Somerset. Division Two was won by Warwickshire with Kent finishing second; both teams were promoted to Division One. The two teams started the final round of matches equal on points and played each other in a title decider, Warwickshire winning to claim the Division Two title. Lancashire and Worcestershire finished in the bottom two places in Division One and were relegated to Division Two.

=== One-Day Cup ===
The group stage of the One-Day Cup competition was played in a block of matches starting on 17 May. Teams were organised in two geographical divisions, with each team playing eight 50-over fixtures and the top three teams in each group advancing to the play-off stage. During the group stage teams played every other team in their division, with the final group games played on 7 June. A series of play-off matches later in June saw Hampshire and Kent advance to the final which was played at Lord's on 30 June, Hampshire winning the title by 61 runs.

=== t20 Blast ===
The group stages of the men's T20 Blast competition was played in a block of matches in the same geographical groups as the One-Day Cup. Group matches were played in a block between 4 July and 17 August, each team playing 14 group-stage matches. The quarter-finals were played between 23 and 26 August with Finals Day on 15 September at Edgbaston. Worcestershire defeated Sussex in the final.

=== Women's County Championship ===
The 2018 Women's County Championship ran from the beginning of May to the beginning of June. Each of the eight teams in Division One of the Championship played seven one-day fixtures, once against each of the other teams. It was won by Hampshire, the team's first title, with Yorkshire finishing as runners-up.

=== Women's Twenty20 Cup ===
The 2018 Women's Twenty20 Cup took place in June and July 2018, with 36 county teams competing in three divisions. Middlesex won Division One, claiming their first Twenty20 title.

=== Women's Cricket Super League ===
During August 2018 the ECB announced that the Women's Super League would be expanded for the 2018 season with more group games played. In 2018 each team played each other both home and away with 10 group matches per team, compared to the five group matches played in 2016 and 2017. The group stage of the competition began on 22 July and ran until 18 August with Finals Day taking place at Hove on 27 August. Surrey Stars won the competition, defeating Loughborough Lightning in the final.

=== Minor Counties Competitions ===
The Minor Counties Championship began in June and ran until September with teams organised in two divisions based on their geographical location. Each team played six three-day matches against six of the nine other teams in their division. The divisional winners Berkshire and Lincolnshire qualified for the four-day Championship Final, which was played between 16 and 19 September at the Banbury Cricket Club Ground in Oxfordshire, with Berkshire winning the Championship.

The Minor Counties Knockout Trophy was played on a straight knock-out basis over five rounds, a change from previous seasons. Cheshire won the final with Devon the beaten finalists.

A new Twenty20 competition was introduced in 2018 with group matches played at the beginning of the season, replacing some of the matches previously played in the Knockout Trophy group stage. Counties were placed in four geographical divisions of five teams for the competition, each playing eight matches over four match days, with both matches against an opposition team being played on the same day as a double-header. A Minor Counties T20 competition was trialled in 2015 but has not been played since. The T20 competition was won by Berkshire, who defeated Cheshire in the final.

The first stages of both one-day competitions were played at the start of the season with Championship matches moving towards the later half the cricket season. The Finals Days for both one-day competitions was played at the end of August at Wormsley Park in Buckinghamshire.

== See also ==
- International cricket in 2018
