= Charlie Thurston =

English cricketer (born 1996)

Personal information
- Full name: Charlie Oliver Thurston
- Born: 17 August 1996 (age 30); Cambridge, Cambridgeshire, England
- Batting: Right-handed
- Bowling: Right-arm medium
- Role: Batsman

Domestic team information
- Years: Team
- 2016–2018: Loughborough MCCU
- 2018–2022: Northamptonshire (squad no. 96)
- First-class debut: 31 March 2016; Loughborough MCCU v Surrey
- List A debut: 7 June 2018 Northants v Yorkshire

Career statistics
Competition	FC	LA	T20
Matches	19	8	12
Runs scored	735	153	109
Batting average	26.25	30.60	12.11
100s/50s	2/2	0/1	0/0
Top score	126	53	41
Balls bowled	18	–	–
Wickets	0	–	–
Bowling average	–	–	–
5 wickets in innings	–	–	–
10 wickets in match	–	–	–
Best bowling	–	–	–
Catches/stumpings	7/–	3/–	6/–
- Source: Cricinfo, 26 September 2021

Charlie Oliver Thurston (born 17 August 1996) is an English cricketer. He made his List A debut for Northamptonshire in the 2018 Royal London One-Day Cup on 7 June 2018. He made his Twenty20 debut for Northamptonshire in the 2018 t20 Blast on 3 August 2018.
