= Ravi Patel =

Ravi Patel is the name of:

- Ravi Patel (actor) (born 1978), American actor
- Ravi Patel (cricketer) (born 1991), English cricketer
