= Harry Dearden =

English cricketer (born 1997)

Personal information
- Full name: Harry Edward Dearden
- Born: 7 May 1997 (age 29); Bury, Greater Manchester, England
- Batting: Left-handed
- Bowling: Right-arm off break
- Role: Batsman

Domestic team information
- Years: Team
- 2016–present: Leicestershire (squad no. 5)
- First-class debut: 12 September 2016 Leicestershire v Derbyshire
- List A debut: 7 June 2018 Leicestershire v Durham

Career statistics
Competition	FC	LA	T20
Matches	45	10	22
Runs scored	1,629	341	348
Batting average	21.43	34.10	19.33
100s/50s	0/8	0/3	0/1
Top score	87	91	61
Balls bowled	129	–	–
Wickets	2	–	–
Bowling average	58.00	–	–
5 wickets in innings	0	–	–
10 wickets in match	0	0	0
Best bowling	1/0	–	–
Catches/stumpings	29/–	2/–	8/–
- Source: CricInfo, 7 August 2021

Harry Edward Dearden (born 7 May 1997) is an English cricketer. He made his first-class debut for Leicestershire on 12 September 2016 in the 2016 County Championship. He made his List A debut for Leicestershire in the 2018 Royal London One-Day Cup on 7 June 2018. He made his Twenty20 debut for Leicestershire in the 2018 t20 Blast on 17 August 2018.
