= Robert Lanchbury =

English cricketer

Cricket information
- Batting: Right-handed

Career statistics
Competition	First-class	List A
Matches	14	10
Runs scored	357	102
Batting average	17.85	12.75
100s/50s	0/1	0/0
Top score	50*	40
Balls bowled	12	–
Wickets	0	–
Bowling average	–	–
5 wickets in innings	–	–
10 wickets in match	–	–
Best bowling	–	–
Catches/stumpings	2/0	1/0
- Source: Cricinfo, 30 December 2021

Robert John Lanchbury (born 11 February 1950) is a former English first-class cricketer who played for Gloucestershire and Worcestershire in the early 1970s, as well as making a few one-day appearances.

== Early years ==
Born in Evesham, Worcestershire, Lanchbury attended Cheltenham Grammar School, where he played in the First XI. After leaving school, he made a number of appearances for Gloucestershire's Second XI between 1969 and 1971. At the end of July 1971, he was called into the first team to open the batting in the County Championship match at Worcester, but although Gloucestershire won by an innings, bowling out their opponents for 58 and 88, Lanchbury failed personally, being bowled for a duck by Vanburn Holder.

Despite this failure, he kept his place in the side for the next few matches, but his highest score from eight further first-class innings (and a solitary appearance in the John Player League) was the 38 he hit in the return encounter against Worcestershire at Cheltenham, and later in August a run of four successive dismissals for single-figure scores saw him dropped. He left the county at the end of the season and made the short trip to join Worcestershire.

== Sitting out ==
1972 was a frustrating season for Lanchbury as he made no first-team appearances, having to wait until the New Zealanders' visit to New Road in late April 1973 to make his senior debut for his new county. Play was possible on only two of the scheduled three days and the game was drawn, but Lanchbury made a handy 46 in the Worcestershire middle order. He ended up playing in another four first-class games that summer, as well as making two undistinguished appearances at List A level. However, by the end of the year, he was firmly back in the seconds, for whom he hit 132 not out against Glamorgan II in late August.

The 1974 season held few highlights for Lanchbury, other than his solitary first-class half-century: 50* against Oxford University early in the season. At this point he was scoring consistently for the second team, and in mid-June he was recalled to County Championship action against Warwickshire, scoring 29 and 27 before being dismissed in each innings by Eddie Hemmings. He played a couple more first-team matches with little success, but he did make 97 in a minor match against the Canadians in July.

That was the end of his county career, and in 1975, Lanchbury played in the Lancashire League as Lowerhouse's professional. Through the late 1970s and 1980s, he also played a number of minor games for Marylebone Cricket Club (MCC) against Ireland and Scotland, but in 1984, he joined Wiltshire, and played for them until 1988. He played twice for them at List A level in the NatWest Trophy, as well as representing the Minor Counties representative side in two Benson & Hedges Cup games. He also made one final first-class appearance, for Minor Counties against the Zimbabweans at Cleethorpes in 1985. In this game, he bowled the only two overs of his first-class career.
