= 2020 Southern Vipers season =

Southern Vipers
2020 season
- Coach: Charlotte Edwards
- Captain: Georgia Adams
- RHFT: Champions
- Most runs: Georgia Adams (500)
- Most wickets: Charlotte Taylor (15)
- Most catches: Maia Bouchier (10); Paige Scholfield (10)
- Most wicket-keeping dismissals: Carla Rudd (7)

The 2020 season saw Southern Vipers compete in the new 50 over Rachael Heyhoe Flint Trophy following reforms to the structure of women's domestic cricket in England. The side topped the South Group of the competition, winning all six of their matches, therefore progressing to the final, where they played Northern Diamonds. The Vipers went on to become the inaugural winners of the Rachael Heyhoe Flint Trophy as they won by 38 runs, with bowler Charlotte Taylor taking 6/34. Taylor was the leading wicket-taker in the tournament, with 15 wickets, whilst Vipers captain Georgia Adams was the leading run-scorer, with 500 runs.

After the ending of the Women's Cricket Super League in 2019, the ECB announced the beginning of a new "women's elite domestic structure". Eight teams were included in this new structure, with Southern Vipers being one of two teams that had their brand retained as a domestic regional hub. Due to the impact of the COVID-19 pandemic, only the Rachael Heyhoe Flint Trophy was able to take place. Southern Vipers were captained by Georgia Adams and coached by former Vipers player Charlotte Edwards, and played their home matches at the Rose Bowl and the County Ground, Hove.

== Squad ==
Southern Vipers announced their squad for the season on 14 August 2020. Georgia Elwiss withdrew from the squad due to injury and was replaced by Charlotte Taylor. Age given is at the start of Southern Vipers' first match of the season (29 August 2020).

Name	Nationality	Birth date	Batting Style	Bowling Style	Notes
Batters
Georgia Adams	England	4 October 1993 (aged 26)	Right-handed	Right-arm medium	Captain
Maia Bouchier	England	5 December 1998 (aged 21)	Right-handed	Right-arm medium	
Ella McCaughan	England	26 September 2002 (aged 17)	Right-handed	Right-arm leg break	
Emily Windsor	England	14 June 1997 (aged 23)	Right-handed	Right-arm medium	
All-rounders
Ella Chandler	England	19 October 2000 (aged 19)	Right-handed	Right-arm medium	
Charlie Dean	England	22 December 2000 (aged 19)	Right-handed	Right-arm off break	
Freya Kemp	England	21 April 2005 (aged 15)	Right-handed	Right-arm medium	
Alice Monaghan	England	20 March 2000 (aged 20)	Right-handed	Right-arm medium	
Paige Scholfield	England	19 December 1995 (aged 24)	Right-handed	Right-arm medium	
Charlotte Taylor	England	2 February 1994 (aged 26)	Right-handed	Right-arm medium	
Danni Wyatt	England	22 April 1991 (aged 29)	Right-handed	Right-arm off break	
Wicket-keepers
Ariana Dowse	England	8 February 2001 (aged 19)	Right-handed	—	
Carla Rudd	England	30 December 1993 (aged 26)	Right-handed	—	
Bowlers
Lauren Bell	England	2 January 2001 (aged 19)	Right-handed	Right-arm medium	
Providence Cowdrill	England	31 March 1999 (aged 21)	Right-handed	Right-arm leg break	
Cassidy McCarthy	England	23 July 2002 (aged 18)	Right-handed	Right-arm medium	
Tara Norris	England	4 June 1998 (aged 22)	Left-handed	Left-arm medium	

== Rachael Heyhoe Flint Trophy ==
=== South Group ===
Pos	Team	Pld	W	L	T	NR	BP	Pts	NRR
1	Southern Vipers	6	6	0	0	0	3	27	1.017
2	Western Storm	6	4	2	0	0	2	18	0.510
3	South East Stars	6	2	4	0	0	2	10	−0.197
4	Sunrisers	6	0	6	0	0	0	0	−1.365

Source: ESPN Cricinfo

Advanced to the Final.

=== Fixtures ===
29 August 2020
10:30 BST
Scorecard

Sunrisers; 202 (46.1 overs)	v	Southern Vipers; 208/3 (36.2 overs)
Mady Villiers 64 (83); Paige Scholfield 3/33 (9.1 overs)		Danni Wyatt 66 (73); Alice Macleod 1/14 (3 overs)

Southern Vipers won by 7 wickets
County Cricket Ground, Chelmsford
Umpires: Chris Watts and Anna Harris

- Southern Vipers won the toss and elected to field.
- Points: Southern Vipers 5, Sunrisers 0

31 August 2020
10:30 BST
Scorecard

Southern Vipers; 261/7 (50 overs)	v	Western Storm; 239 (47.5 overs)
Charlie Dean 60* (70); Heather Knight 2/36 (10 overs)		Heather Knight 67 (80); Tara Norris 4/45 (8 overs)

Southern Vipers won by 22 runs
County Ground, Bristol
Umpires: Jeremy Lloyds and Yvonne Dolphin-Cooper

- Western Storm won the toss and elected to field.
- Points: Southern Vipers 4, Western Storm 0

5 September 2020
10:30 BST
Scorecard

Southern Vipers; 209/8 (50 overs)	v	South East Stars; 98 (36.5 overs)
Ella McCaughan 50 (81); Tash Farrant 2/28 (10 overs)		Aylish Cranstone 28 (50); Tara Norris 3/27 (8.5 overs)

Southern Vipers won by 111 runs
County Ground, Hove
Umpires: Mark Newell and Sarah Bartlett

- Southern Vipers won the toss and elected to bat.
- Points: Southern Vipers 5, South East Stars 0

11 September 2020
10:30 BST
Scorecard

Southern Vipers; 232 (49.5 overs)	v	Sunrisers; 183 (43.5 overs)
Georgia Adams 89 (108); Katie Midwood 2/33 (10 overs)		Alice Macleod 35 (45); Tara Norris 3/37 (7 overs)

Southern Vipers won by 49 runs
Rose Bowl, Southampton
Umpires: Billy Taylor and Sophie McLelland

- Southern Vipers won the toss and elected to bat.
- Points: Southern Vipers 5, Sunrisers 0

13 September 2020
10:30 BST
Scorecard

Southern Vipers; 288/1 (50 overs)	v	Western Storm; 256 (50 overs)
Georgia Adams 154* (155); Fi Morris 1/49 (10 overs)		Sophie Luff 79 (88); Charlotte Taylor 4/41 (10 overs)

Southern Vipers won by 32 runs
Rose Bowl, Southampton
Umpires: Mark Newell and Sarah Bartlett

- Southern Vipers won the toss and elected to bat.
- Points: Southern Vipers 4, Western Storm 0

19 September 2020
10:30 BST
Scorecard

South East Stars; 227 (48.3 overs)	v	Southern Vipers; 230/6 (47.2 overs)
Chloe Brewer 79 (107); Lauren Bell 4/36 (10 overs)		Emily Windsor 47* (43); Danielle Gregory 3/44 (10 overs)

Southern Vipers won by 4 wickets
The Oval, London
Umpires: Ben Debenham and Anna Harris

- South East Stars won the toss and elected to bat.
- Points: Southern Vipers 4, South East Stars 0

=== Final ===
27 September 2020
10:30 BST
Scorecard

Southern Vipers; 231 (49.5 overs)	v	Northern Diamonds; 193 (42.2 overs)
Georgia Adams 80 (102); Katie Levick 3/49 (8 overs)		Sterre Kalis 55 (75); Charlotte Taylor 6/34 (10 overs)

Southern Vipers won by 38 runs
Edgbaston, Birmingham
Umpires: Neil Pratt and Rob White
Player of the match: Charlotte Taylor (Southern Vipers)

- Northern Diamonds won the toss and elected to field.

== Statistics ==
=== Batting ===
Player	Matches	Innings	NO	Runs	HS	Average	Strike rate	100s	50s	4s	6s
Georgia Adams	7	7	1	500	154*	83.33	81.69	1	3	60	0
Lauren Bell	4	1	1	6	6*	–	150.00	0	0	1	0
Maia Bouchier	7	7	1	183	50*	30.50	85.51	0	1	22	1
Ella Chandler	1	1	0	5	5	5.00	83.33	0	0	0	0
Providence Cowdrill	3	1	0	4	4	4.00	100.00	0	0	0	0
Charlie Dean	7	6	2	180	60*	45.00	73.77	0	1	16	0
Ella McCaughan	7	6	0	172	63	28.66	59.10	0	2	19	0
Alice Monaghan	7	3	1	11	8	5.50	47.82	0	0	0	0
Tara Norris	7	5	2	27	10*	9.00	50.00	0	0	1	0
Carla Rudd	7	5	0	81	35	16.20	74.31	0	0	8	0
Paige Scholfield	7	6	1	87	31	17.40	67.96	0	0	7	1
Charlotte Taylor	5	3	2	20	12*	20.00	55.55	0	0	1	0
Emily Windsor	6	4	1	112	47*	37.33	74.17	0	0	12	0
Danni Wyatt	2	2	0	119	66	59.50	89.47	0	2	13	0
Source: ESPN Cricinfo

=== Bowling ===
Player	Matches	Innings	Overs	Maidens	Runs	Wickets	BBI	Average	Economy	Strike rate
Georgia Adams	7	7	37.4	2	154	7	3/23	22.00	4.08	32.2
Lauren Bell	4	4	36.0	2	151	7	4/36	21.57	4.19	30.8
Maia Bouchier	7	4	18.0	0	83	1	1/13	83.00	4.61	108.0
Providence Cowdrill	3	3	14.5	0	73	3	2/21	24.33	4.92	29.6
Charlie Dean	7	7	58.0	2	269	9	3/50	29.88	4.63	38.6
Alice Monaghan	7	2	4.0	0	18	0	–	–	4.50	–
Tara Norris	7	7	44.5	2	215	12	4/45	17.91	4.79	22.4
Paige Scholfield	7	7	51.1	2	212	9	3/33	23.55	4.14	34.1
Charlotte Taylor	5	5	44.0	2	152	15	6/34	10.13	3.45	17.6
Danni Wyatt	2	2	7.0	0	27	1	1/16	27.00	3.85	42.0
Source: ESPN Cricinfo

=== Fielding ===
Player	Matches	Innings	Catches
Georgia Adams	7	7	5
Lauren Bell	4	4	0
Maia Bouchier	7	7	10
Ella Chandler	1	1	0
Providence Cowdrill	3	3	1
Charlie Dean	7	7	4
Ella McCaughan	7	7	4
Alice Monaghan	7	7	3
Tara Norris	7	7	1
Paige Scholfield	7	7	10
Charlotte Taylor	5	5	0
Emily Windsor	6	6	1
Danni Wyatt	2	2	0
Source: ESPN Cricinfo

=== Wicket-keeping ===
Player	Matches	Innings	Catches	Stumpings
Carla Rudd	7	7	3	4
Source: ESPN Cricinfo
