= Tony Goodfellow =

English cricketer

Personal information
- Full name: Anthony Goodfellow
- Born: 8 January 1940 (age 86); Seale, Surrey, England
- Batting: Left-handed

Domestic team information
- Years: Team
- 1960–1962: Cambridge University

Career statistics
Competition	First-class
Matches	21
Runs scored	941
Batting average	22.95
100s/50s	0/5
Top score	81
Balls bowled	6
Wickets	0
Bowling average	–
5 wickets in innings	–
10 wickets in match	–
Best bowling	–
Catches/stumpings	6/–
- Source: Cricinfo, 25 May 2020

Anthony Goodfellow (born 8 January 1940) is a former English first-class cricketer who played for Cambridge University from 1960 and 1962.

Tony Goodfellow attended Marlborough College before going up to Magdalene College, Cambridge. An opening and middle-order batsman, he gained his blue in 1961 and 1962. His highest score was 81 against Leicestershire in 1961, when he and Edward Craig put on 185 for the first wicket, and Cambridge went on to win by six wickets.
