= Matt Carter (cricketer) =

English cricketer (born 1996)

Personal information
- Full name: Matthew Carter
- Born: 26 May 1996 (age 30); Lincoln, Lincolnshire, England
- Height: 6 ft 6 in (1.98 m)
- Batting: Right-handed
- Bowling: Right-arm off break
- Role: Bowler
- Relatives: Andy Carter (brother)

Domestic team information
- Years: Team
- 2013–2021: Lincolnshire
- 2015–2023: Nottinghamshire (squad no. 20)
- 2021–2023: Trent Rockets
- FC debut: 14 June 2015 Nottinghamshire v Somerset
- LA debut: 27 May 2018 Nottinghamshire v Warwickshire

Career statistics
Competition	FC	LA	T20
Matches	18	16	76
Runs scored	264	65	168
Batting average	10.15	7.22	9.88
100s/50s	0/0	0/0	0/0
Top score	33	21*	23*
Balls bowled	3,846	701	1,458
Wickets	54	23	71
Bowling average	39.55	27.17	26.54
5 wickets in innings	2	0	0
10 wickets in match	1	0	0
Best bowling	7/56	4/40	3/14
Catches/stumpings	16/–	5/–	29/–
- Source: ESPNcricinfo, 30 September 2023

Matthew Carter (born 26 May 1996) is an English professional cricketer who spent nine seasons at Nottinghamshire and has also played for Trent Rockets.

== Career ==
Off-spin bowler Carter took figures of 10/195, including 7/56 in the first-innings, on his first-class cricket debut for Nottinghamshire against Somerset on a turning pitch in June 2015.

"from a tall classical action with flight, bite and composure, Carter returned the best figures by a spin bowler on Championship debut since Leicestershire's Jack Walsh claimed 7 for 46 against Northamptonshire in 1938"

He made his List A debut for Nottinghamshire in the 2018 Royal London One-Day Cup on 27 May 2018 and his first Twenty20 appearance for the club in the 2018 t20 Blast on 17 August 2018. He was drafted by Trent Rockets for the inaugural season of The Hundred. In April 2022, he was bought by the Trent Rockets for the 2022 season of The Hundred.

On 22 May 2024, Nottinghamshire announced that Carter, who has signed a new one-year contract at the end of the 2023 season, had left the club by mutual consent.

== Personal life ==
Carter's older brother Andy played first-class cricket for several county teams including Nottinghamshire and Derbyshire.
