= Will Fraine =

English cricketer (born 1996)

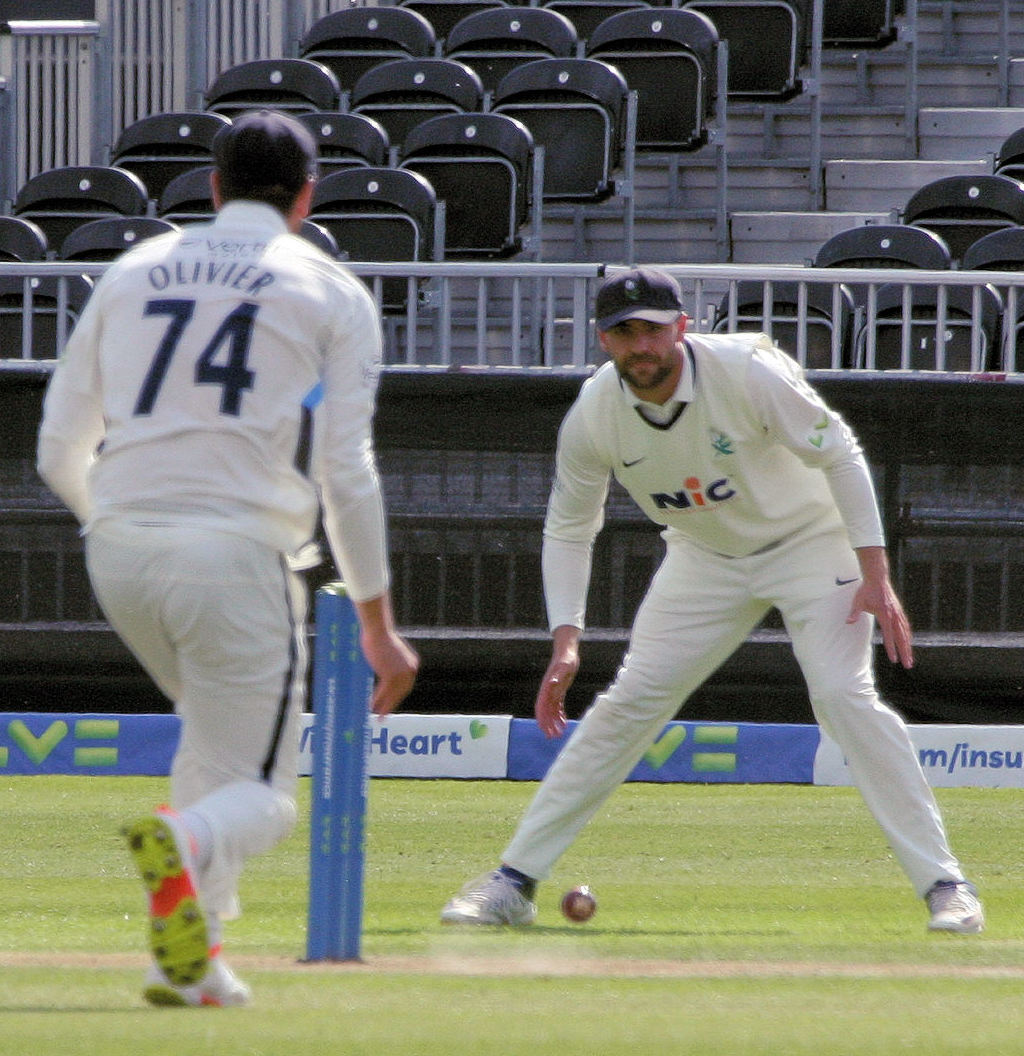
- Fraine (right) playing for Yorkshire CCC in 2021

Personal information
- Full name: William Alan Richard Fraine
- Born: 13 June 1996 (age 30); Huddersfield, West Yorkshire, England
- Batting: Right-handed
- Bowling: Right-arm medium
- Role: Batsman

Domestic team information
- Years: Team
- 2017–2018: Durham MCCU
- 2018: Nottinghamshire (squad no. 31)
- 2019–2023: Yorkshire
- 2021/22: Mashonaland Eagles
- 2024/25: Matabeleland Tuskers
- First-class debut: 28 March 2017; Durham MCCU v Gloucestershire
- List A debut: 17 May 2018; Nottinghamshire v Lancashire

Career statistics
Competition	FC	LA	T20
Matches	31	26	36
Runs scored	1,135	706	411
Batting average	23.16	33.61	17.86
100s/50s	2/3	1/3	0/0
Top score	106	143	44*
Catches/stumpings	19/–	12/–	20/–
- Source: Cricinfo, 17 December 2024

William Alan Richard Fraine (born 13 June 1996) is an English cricketer. He made his first-class debut on 28 March 2017 for Durham MCCU against Gloucestershire as part of the Marylebone Cricket Club University fixtures. He made his List A debut for Nottinghamshire in the 2018 Royal London One-Day Cup on 17 May 2018. He made his Twenty20 debut for Nottinghamshire in the 2018 t20 Blast on 6 July 2018.

Fraine studied at Collingwood College, Durham for a degree in Sport, Exercise and Physical Activity.
