= Henry Brookes =

English cricketer (born 1999)

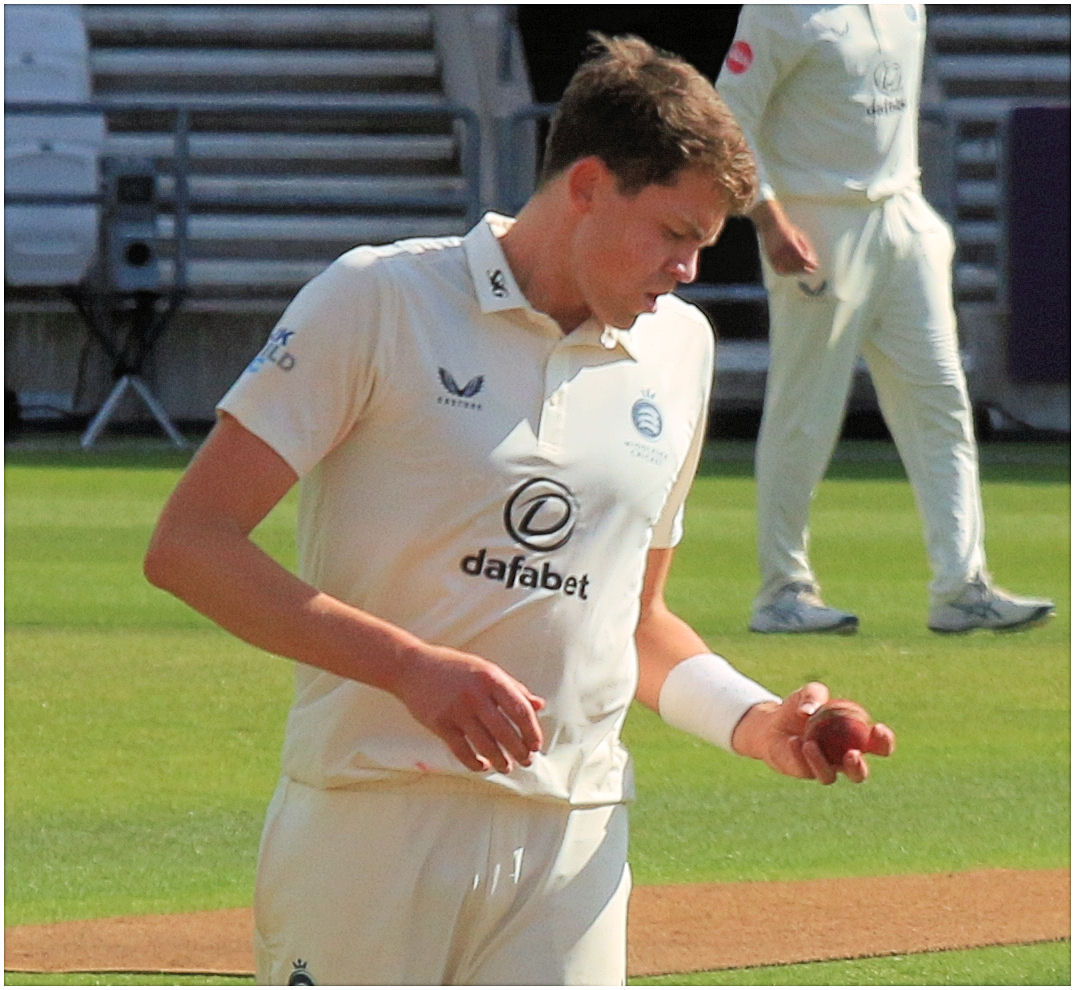
- Brookes in 2024

Personal information
- Full name: Henry James Hamilton Brookes
- Born: 21 August 1999 (age 27); Solihull, West Midlands, England
- Height: 6 ft 3 in (1.91 m)
- Batting: Right-handed
- Bowling: Right-arm fast
- Role: Bowler
- Relatives: EA Brookes (brother)

Domestic team information
- Years: Team
- 2017–2023: Warwickshire (squad no. 10)
- 2022–2023: Birmingham Phoenix
- 2023: → Derbyshire (on loan)
- 2024–present: Middlesex (squad no. 8)
- 2024/25: Mid West Rhinos
- 2026: → Gloucestershire (on loan)
- First-class debut: 12 September 2017 Warwickshire v Essex
- List A debut: 20 May 2018 Warwickshire v Yorkshire

Career statistics
Competition	FC	LA	T20
Matches	52	41	57
Runs scored	1,072	129	195
Batting average	17.86	9.21	11.47
100s/50s	0/7	0/0	0/0
Top score	84	29*	31*
Balls bowled	7,527	1,817	1,097
Wickets	126	60	63
Bowling average	38.58	29.66	27.60
5 wickets in innings	1	0	1
10 wickets in match	0	0	0
Best bowling	6/20	4/43	5/25
Catches/stumpings	14/–	3/–	15/–
- Source: Cricinfo, 12 August 2026

Henry James Hamilton Brookes (born 21 August 1999) is an English cricketer.

Brookes made his first-class debut for Warwickshire in the 2017 County Championship on 12 September 2017. He made his List A debut for Warwickshire in the 2018 Royal London One-Day Cup on 20 May 2018. He made his Twenty20 debut for Warwickshire in the 2018 t20 Blast on 4 July 2018. He got his first 5 wicket haul in The Hundred for Birmingham Phoenix against Southern Brave on 10 August 2022.

On 29 May 2020, Brookes was named in a 55-man group of players to begin training ahead of international fixtures starting in England following the COVID-19 pandemic. On 9 July 2020, Brookes was included in England's 24-man squad to start training behind closed doors for the One Day International (ODI) series against Ireland.

In April 2022, he was bought by the Birmingham Phoenix for the 2022 season of The Hundred.

He joined Middlesex on 12 December 2023 for the 2024 season.

In April 2026, Brookes joined Gloucestershire on loan for five County Championship matches. However, his loan spell was cut short after he suffered a hamstring injury in his second match. On July 17, 2026, Gloucestershire announced they had signed Brookes on a three year contract beginning in 2027.
