= Connor Brown (cricketer) =

Welsh cricketer (born 1997)

Personal information
- Full name: Connor Rhys Brown
- Born: 28 April 1997 (age 29); Caerphilly, Glamorgan, Wales
- Batting: Right-handed
- Bowling: Right-arm off break
- Role: Batsman

Domestic team information
- Years: Team
- 2017–present: Cardiff MCCU
- 2017–2020: Glamorgan (squad no. 28)
- First-class debut: 28 March 2017; Cardiff MCCU v Glamorgan
- List A debut: 30 May 2018 Glamorgan v Essex

Career statistics
Competition	FC	LA
Matches	10	3
Runs scored	249	163
Batting average	13.10	54.33
100s/50s	0/0	0/1
Top score	35	98
Balls bowled	24	–
Wickets	0	–
Bowling average	–	–
5 wickets in innings	–	–
10 wickets in match	–	n/a
Best bowling	–	–
Catches/stumpings	3/–	1/–
- Source: Cricinfo, 28 September 2018

Connor Rhys Brown (born 28 April 1997) is a Welsh cricketer. He made his first-class debut on 28 March 2017 for Cardiff MCCU against Glamorgan as part of the Marylebone Cricket Club University fixtures. He made his List A debut for Glamorgan in the 2018 Royal London One-Day Cup on 30 May 2018. Brown was released by Glamorgan ahead of the 2021 County Championship.
