= George Drissell =

English cricketer (born 1999)

Personal information
- Full name: George Samuel Drissell
- Born: 20 January 1999 (age 27); Bristol, England
- Batting: Right-handed
- Bowling: Right-arm off break
- Role: Bowler

Domestic team information
- Years: Team
- 2017–2020: Gloucestershire (squad no. 20)
- 2021: Somerset
- 2022–2026: Durham (squad no. 8)
- First-class debut: 6 August 2017; Gloucestershire v Northamptonshire
- List A debut: 6 June 2018; Gloucestershire v Middlesex

Career statistics
Competition	FC	LA	T20
Matches	22	34	6
Runs scored	570	309	0
Batting average	20.35	15.45	0.00
100s/50s	0/3	0/0	0/0
Top score	82	46	0
Balls bowled	3,224	1,404	73
Wickets	37	29	2
Bowling average	54.08	44.65	50.50
5 wickets in innings	1	0	0
10 wickets in match	0	0	0
Best bowling	5/59	4/38	1/20
Catches/stumpings	12/–	22/–	3/–
- Source: Cricinfo, 12 August 2026

George Samuel Drissell (born 20 January 1999) is an English cricketer. He made his first-class debut for Gloucestershire in the 2017 County Championship on 6 August 2017. He made his List A debut for Gloucestershire in the 2018 Royal London One-Day Cup on 6 June 2018.

Drissell was released by Gloucestershire in September 2020. He subsequently joined Somerset for the 2021 One-Day Cup, playing five matches in the tournament. He signed a contract with Durham in November 2021, having played in the club's second XI in September. He made his Twenty20 debut on 29 May 2022, for Durham in the 2022 T20 Blast.

In June 2025, Drissell conceded the most runs in an innings in the history of the County Championship, finishing with figures of 1 for 247 off 45 overs against Surrey at The Oval.
