= Andy Carter (cricketer) =

English cricketer

Personal information
- Full name: Andrew Carter
- Born: 27 August 1988 (age 38); Lincoln, Lincolnshire, England
- Batting: Right-handed
- Bowling: Right-arm medium
- Relatives: Matthew Carter (brother)

Domestic team information
- Years: Team
- 2007–2012: Lincolnshire
- 2009–2015: Nottinghamshire (squad no. 17)
- 2010: → Essex (on loan)
- 2015: → Glamorgan (on loan)
- 2016: Derbyshire
- 2016: Hampshire
- 2017: Northamptonshire
- 2017–2018: Lincolnshire
- 2018: Worcestershire
- FC debut: 18 June 2009 Nottinghamshire v Oxford UCCE
- LA debut: 9 August 2009 Nottinghamshire v Essex

Career statistics
Competition	FC	LA	T20
Matches	36	23	35
Runs scored	307	35	5
Batting average	10.96	5.83	5.00
100s/50s	0/0	0/0	0/0
Top score	39	12	5*
Balls bowled	5,605	772	669
Wickets	108	31	37
Bowling average	29.62	25.77	25.48
5 wickets in innings	2	0	0
10 wickets in match	0	0	0
Best bowling	5/40	4/45	4/20
Catches/stumpings	8/–	7/–	7/–
- Source: ESPNcricinfo, 16 August 2018

Andrew Carter (born 27 August 1988) is an English cricketer. A right-handed batsman and right-hand medium pace bowler, he began his county career with Nottinghamshire, making his first-class debut for them in June 2009. He also played on loan for Essex in 2010 and Glamorgan in 2015 while with Nottinghamshire. Carter joined Derbyshire prior to the 2016 season, but left the club later in the year. He represented England Lions in 2011.

== County career ==
Born on 27 August 1988 in Lincoln, Carter started out with Lincolnshire in minor counties cricket before signing for Nottinghamshire. He made his first-class debut as a 20-year-old for against Oxford UCCE in 2009, taking two wickets in the match and claiming figures of 1–41 and 1–27 in the first and second innings respectively. He made his List A debut on 9 August 2009 in a loss against Essex in a Pro40 game at Garons Park. Carter took 3 wickets for 32 runs in the first innings to help dismiss Essex for 224. Carter went on to play in deveral further one-day games in 2009. His best figures came on 7 September against Sussex at Hove. He took 2 wickets for 44 in eight overs as Nottinghamshire fell to a 152 run defeat.

In 2010, Carter was restricted to second XI and league cricket appearances, as well as appearing for Lincolnshire, which led to Nottinghamshire agreeing to a one-month loan deal with Essex. In his second game for Essex he took three wickets in the second innings of the match against Yorkshire, also taking one wicket in the fourth innings in a drawn match. In the following match, a one-day game against Northamptonshire, he took 2 wickets for 33 runs in a nine-wicket victory for Essex. In late July, Carter took his career best bowling figures of 7–121 in the County Championship against Kent, also achieving his first five-wicket haul of 5–40 in the same match. Despite this Essex lost the match by 99 runs. In 2010, Carter signed a new two-year contract with Nottinghamshire to keep him at the club until the end of 2012.

In March 2011, Carter was selected and played for the England Lions. He played in one four-day match against the Windward Islands, taking 2 wickets for 30 runs in the second innings of the match as England Lions recorded a 258 run victory. Carter featured prominently in the Nottinghamshire 2011 T20 campaign as he played seven matches. His best figures came against Derbyshire, where he recorded 4 wickets for 20 runs in his four overs helping Nottinghamshire to a 38 run victory. He followed this up in his second match by claiming figures of 2–38 against Yorkshire in a 53 run victory.

Carter joined Glamorgan on a short-term loan in April 2015, taking twelve wickets in three County Championship matches. Two months later, he rejoined Glamorgan on another short-term loan. Having made only one Championship appearance for Nottinghamshire in 2015, Carter turned down a new contract offer from the club in favour of signing a two-year contract with Derbyshire, commencing in the 2016 season. After taking 20 wickets in 16 appearances across all formats, Carter's contract was cancelled by mutual consent in July 2016.
