= Kelham Road =

Cricket ground in Nottinghamshire

Coordinates: 53.08018°N 0.82250°W

- Interactive map of Kelham Road

Ground information
- Location: Newark-on-Trent, Nottinghamshire
- Country: England
- Establishment: 1849 (first recorded match)

Team information
Nottinghamshire	(1856)
- As of 31 August 2010; Source: Ground profile

Kelham Road is a cricket ground in Newark-on-Trent, Nottinghamshire. The first recorded match on the ground was in 1849, when the Newark played an All England Eleven. In 1856, the ground hosted a its only first-class match when Nottinghamshire played an All England Eleven. The ground is the home of Newark Ransome & Marles Cricket Club.
