= Ben Cox =

English cricketer

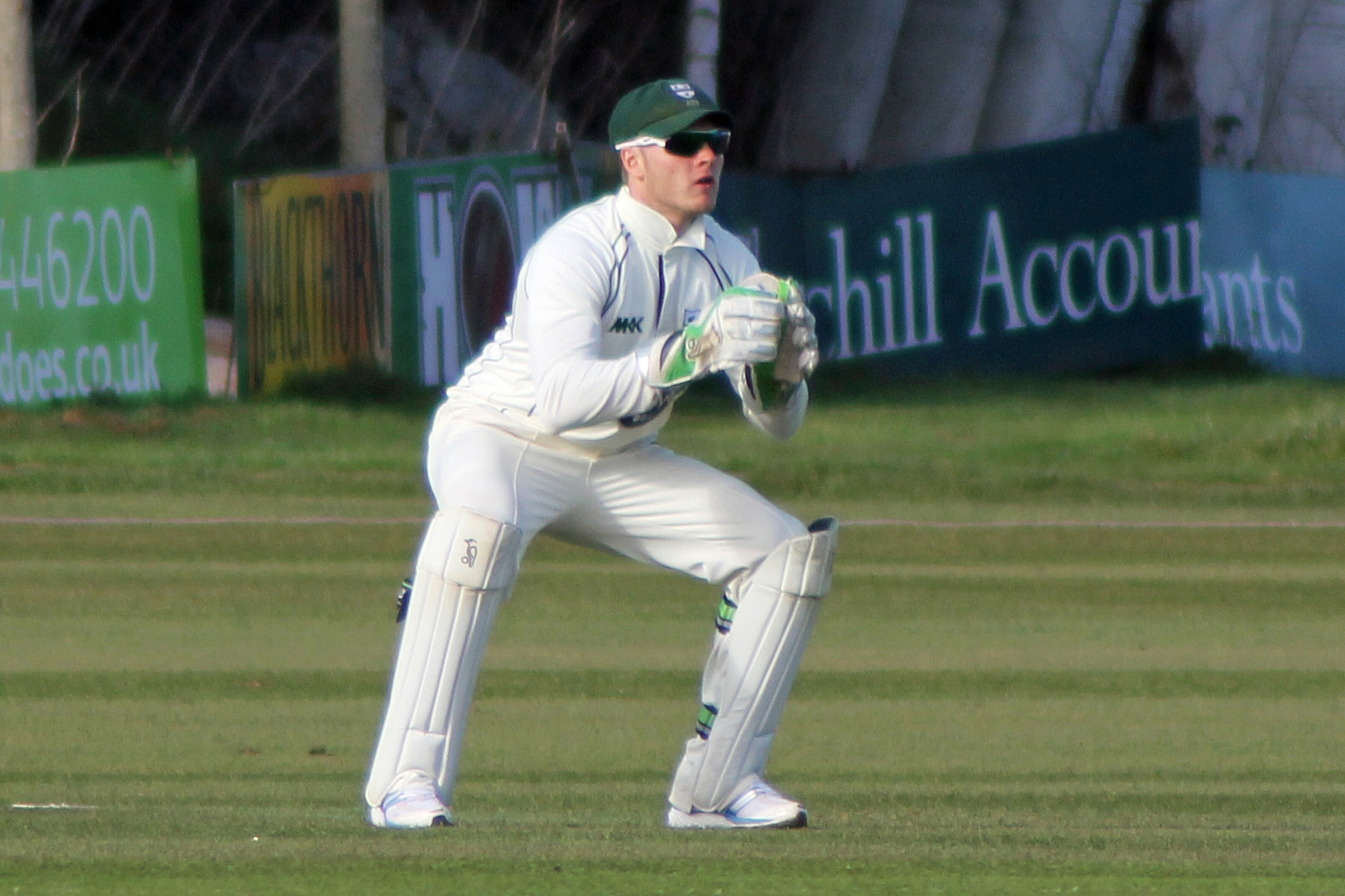

Personal information
- Full name: Oliver Benjamin Cox
- Born: 2 February 1992 (age 34); Wordsley, West Midlands, England
- Height: 5 ft 10 in (1.78 m)
- Batting: Right-handed
- Role: Wicket-keeper

Domestic team information
- Years: Team
- 2009–2023: Worcestershire (squad no. 10)
- 2018: Boost Defenders
- 2018/19: Otago
- 2021: Trent Rockets
- 2023: → Leicestershire (on loan)
- 2024–2026: Leicestershire (squad no. 7)
- 2025: Trent Rockets (squad no. 33)
- FC debut: 16 September 2009 Worcestershire v Somerset
- LA debut: 19 July 2010 Worcestershire v Sussex

Career statistics
Competition	FC	LA	T20
Matches	182	117	198
Runs scored	7,255	2,575	3,110
Batting average	29.49	32.59	26.58
100s/50s	5/40	1/15	0/10
Top score	162	122*	70*
Catches/stumpings	490/21	131/13	96/38
- Source: ESPNcricinfo, 26 September 2026

Oliver Benjamin Cox (born 2 February 1992) is an English cricketer who plays county cricket for Leicestershire as right-handed batsman and wicket-keeper.

Cox has been associated with Worcestershire for some years, having played at Under-13, Under-15 and Under-17 level, although not originally as a wicket-keeper.

He captained the Under-17 side against Somerset U-17s in July 2009, scoring exactly 100.

Cox was called up to make his first-class debut, aged 17, in Worcestershire's penultimate County Championship match of 2009, against Somerset at Taunton. He scored 61 in his only innings of a drawn match (sharing a century partnership with Daryl Mitchell, who scored 298); keeping wicket, his first first-class dismissal was that of Marcus Trescothick, stumped off the bowling of Moeen Ali for 72. He was awarded a four-year contract by Worcestershire later that year.

Cox did not establish himself as Worcestershire's first choice wicket-keeper until 2014 when he was 22 years of age. In that season he scored his first first-class century (against Essex) and was described by former-England wicket-keeper James Foster as "...one of the best young keepers I have ever seen."

In 2018 Vitality Blast Finals day, Cox played a key part in Worcestershire winning their first Vitality T20 Blast trophy. In the Semi-Final, against Lancashire he scored 55* and in the final, against Sussex made 46*, scoring the winning runs. He was made Player of the Match in both games to become to first player to receive two such awards in one day .

In December 2018, he signed with Otago cricket team to play in the 2018–19 Super Smash T20 tournament in New Zealand.

In The 2021 Vitality Blast Campaign, Ben Cox was appointed captain for the competition due to the absence of Moeen Ali. After a 14-year stay at Worcestershire, Ben Cox joined Leicestershire in September 2023.
