= Elm Avenue =

Cricket ground in central England

Coordinates: 53.06295°N 0.79874°W

Ground information
- Location: Newark-on-Trent, Nottinghamshire
- Establishment: 1927 (first recorded match)

Team information
Nottinghamshire	(1966–1978)
- As of 31 August 2010; Source: Ground profile

Elm Avenue is a cricket ground in Newark-on-Trent, Nottinghamshire. The first recorded match on the ground was in 1930 when it was opened by the Ransome & Marles Company. During its history, the ground has played host to 23 Nottinghamshire Second XI matches in both the Minor Counties Championship and Second Eleven Championship.

Nottinghamshire first played first-class cricket at the ground in the 1966 County Championship when it played Lancashire. From 1966 to 1978, the ground hosted 11 first-class matches, the last of which came against Worcestershire.

The ground held its first List-A match in 1970 when Nottinghamshire played Somerset in the John Player League. Between 1970 and 1976, the ground held 4 List-A matches, the last of which saw Nottinghamshire play Middlesex in the 1976 John Player League.

In local domestic cricket, the ground was formerly the home venue of Newark Ransome and Marles Cricket Club.
