= Jonny Tattersall =

English cricketer (born 1994)

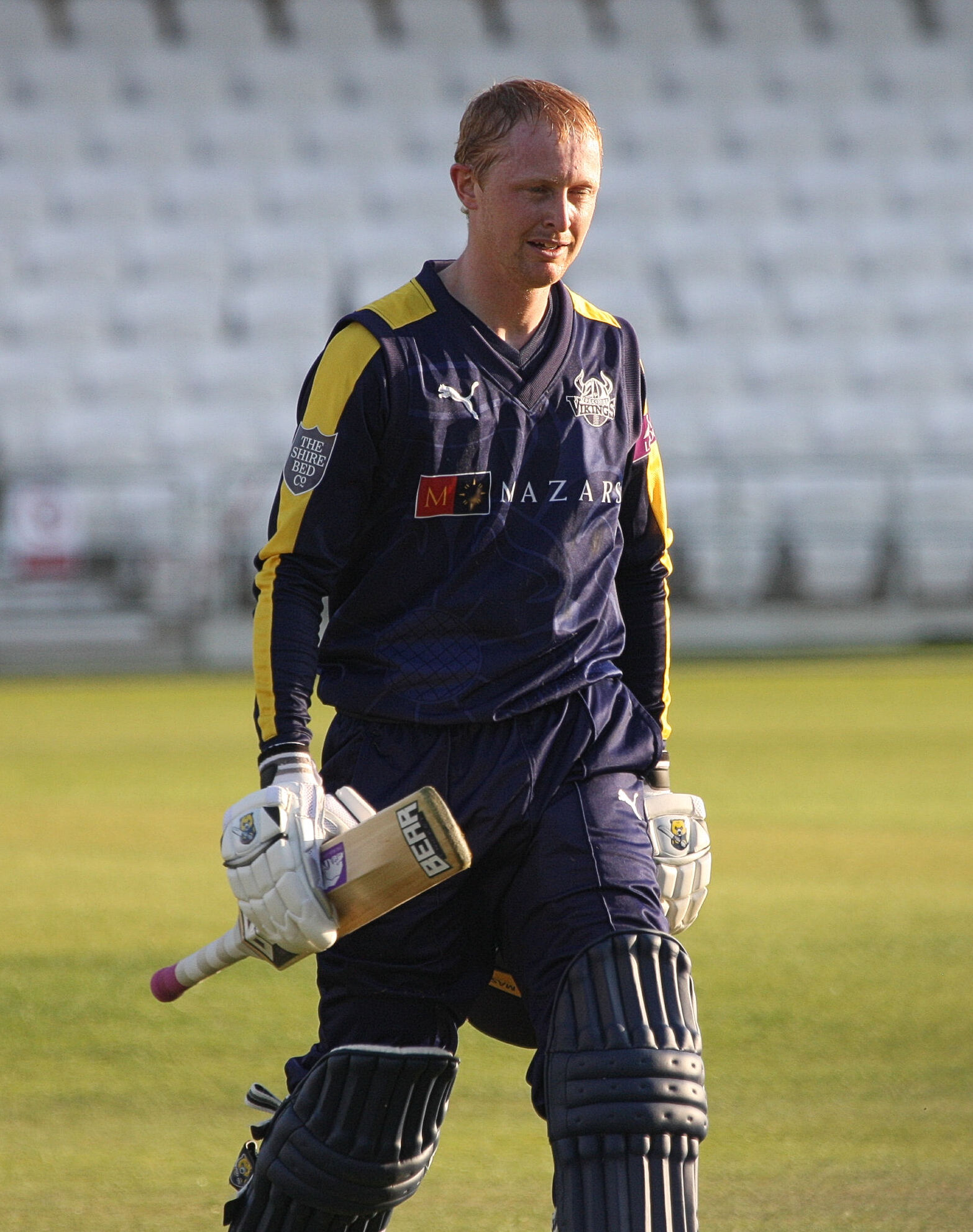
- Tattersall in 2019

Personal information
- Full name: Jonathan Andrew Tattersall
- Born: 15 December 1994 (age 31); Harrogate, North Yorkshire, England
- Batting: Right-handed
- Bowling: Right-arm leg break
- Role: Batsman, wicket-keeper

Domestic team information
- Years: Team
- 2013–2025: Yorkshire (squad no. 12)
- 2021: → Gloucestershire (on loan)
- 2021: → Surrey (on loan)
- 2025: → Leicestershire (on loan)
- 2026–: Leicestershire (squad no. 12)
- First-class debut: 20 June 2018 Yorkshire v Hampshire
- LA debut: 26 August 2013 Yorkshire v Glamorgan

Career statistics
Competition	FC	LA	T20
Matches	75	39	56
Runs scored	3,458	818	568
Batting average	33.90	28.20	21.03
100s/50s	5/16	0/8	0/1
Top score	180*	89	53*
Balls bowled	66	–	–
Wickets	2	–	–
Bowling average	37.00	–	–
5 wickets in innings	0	–	–
10 wickets in match	0	–	–
Best bowling	2/27	–	–
Catches/stumpings	164/11	31/3	38/6
- Source: CricketArchive, 26 September 2026

Jonathan Andrew Tattersall (born 15 December 1994) is an English cricketer who plays for Leicestershire County Cricket Club. He is a right-handed batsman who bowls leg breaks. He made his debut for his home county Yorkshire in the 2013 Yorkshire Bank 40 against Glamorgan. He is a former England under 19s batsman, and his fielding ability saw him fielding as substitute for the England senior side. Tattersall represented England under 19s at the 2014 Under-19 Cricket World Cup.

Tattersall was released by Yorkshire in September 2015, but then recalled. He made his first-class debut on 20 June 2018, for Yorkshire in the 2018 County Championship. He made his Twenty20 debut for Yorkshire in the 2018 t20 Blast on 5 July 2018.

In August 2025, it was announced that Tattersall had agreed a three-year contract to join Leicestershire from 1 November that year.
