= Sports Ground, Cleethorpes =

Cricket ground in Cleethorpes, Lincolnshire

Coordinates: 53°32′54″N 0°01′14″W

Sports Ground
Ground information
- Location: Cleethorpes, Lincolnshire
- Establishment: 1961 (first recorded match)
- End names
- Daggett Road End; Chichester Road End

Team information
Minor Counties	(1984)
Nottinghamshire	(1980-1984 1990, 1995, 1997 & 2003-2004)
Minor Counties North	(1972)
Lincolnshire	(1969-present)
- As of 18 August 2010; Source: Ground profile

The Sports Ground is a cricket ground in Cleethorpes, Lincolnshire. The first recorded match on the ground was in 1961, when Lincolnshire Colts played Derbyshire Juniors.

In 1969, Lincolnshire played their first Minor Counties Championship match at the ground against Staffordshire. From 1969 to present, the ground has hosted 25 Minor Counties Championship matches and 6 MCCA Knockout Trophy matches, the last of which came in 2002 when Lincolnshire played the Leicestershire Cricket Board.

The ground has hosted a number of first-class matches, the first of which came in the 1980 County Championship when Nottinghamshire played Worcestershire. A combined Minor Counties team played a single first-class match at the ground in 1985 against the touring Zimbabweans. Between 1980 and 1990, Nottinghamshire played 4 first-class matches at the ground, including the final first-class match to date at the ground which came against the touring Sri Lankans in 1990.

The ground has also played host to List-A matches. The first List-A match saw Minor Counties North play Nottinghamshire in the 1972 Benson and Hedges Cup. Nottinghamshire have played 5 List-A matches at the ground, including the final one to date to be held at the ground, which came against Durham in 2004. Lincolnshire have also used the match for a single List-A match, which came in the 2000 NatWest Trophy when they played Lancashire.

In local domestic cricket, the Sports Ground is the home venue of Cleethorpes Cricket Club who play in the Yorkshire ECB County Premier League.
