= Town Ground, Worksop =

Cricket ground in Worksop, Nottinghamshire

Town Ground
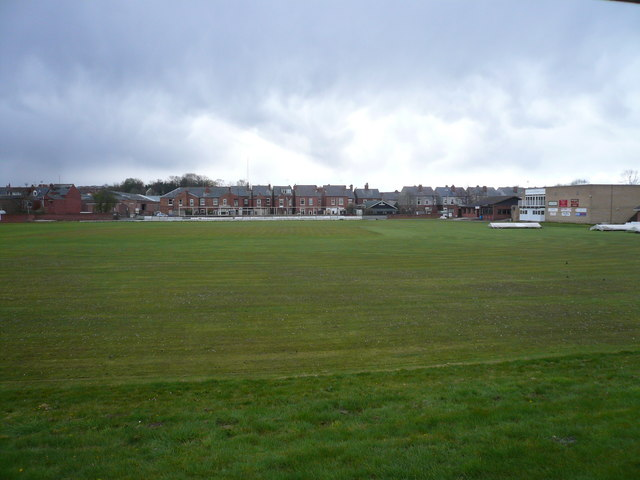
- Interactive map of Town Ground

Ground information
- Location: Worksop, Nottinghamshire
- Country: England
- Coordinates: 53.3061°N 1.1271°W
- Establishment: 1901
- End names
- Canal End; Central Avenue End

Team information
Nottinghamshire	(1921–1998)
- As of 2 August 2021; Source: Ground profile

The Town Ground is a cricket ground in Worksop, Nottinghamshire. The ground is located in the town centre between the Chesterfield Canal and the River Ryton. It played host to first-class and List A cricket matches for Nottinghamshire County Cricket Club between 1921 and 1998.

== History ==
The land on which the Town Ground was built was previously agricultural land. It was given to the town's cricket club in 1900 by a local brewer, William Allen. Construction of the ground required the land to be levelled by some 5 ft 0 in (1.52 m), which some locals believed to be an error as the ground now lies below the water level of the nearby River Ryton. Construction was completed by 1901 and included a pavilion, with the new cricket ground replacing one which had been sited south of the River Ryton. The ground was due to be opened in 1901 with a match between Worksop and Nottinghamshire Club and Ground, but the match was abandoned due to rain. The ground was adjoined on its eastern side by the stadium of Worksop Town F.C. Nottinghamshire first played at the ground in a first-class match against Derbyshire in the 1921 County Championship. Nottinghamshire played there twelve times prior to the Second World War. After a gap of twenty years, Nottinghamshire returned to the ground in 1959 and often played matches there in July to coincide with the annual holidays at the local coalfields. Worksop is located just a few miles from the South Yorkshire border, with Yorkshire being the visitors on thirteen occasions. Their affinity with the ground led to success for Yorkshire players such as Geoffrey Boycott who scored over 900 runs on the ground and averaged well over 100, and Fred Trueman who once took figures of 8 for 84 in 1962. Nottinghamshire played first-class cricket at the ground until 1998, having played 48 first-class matches there in the County Championship, Nottinghamshire also played three List A one-day matches at the Town Ground in the John Player League between 1970 and 1980, with Sussex's Mike Buss making the only List A century at the ground with a score of 121 in 1971.

Facilities at the ground have been improved over time, with the original pavilion being replaced by a new pavilion in 1972 containing both squash and cricket facilities and was further extended by the cricket club in 1987. The adjoining football club left in 1988, having been evicted. The land occupied by the football club was subsequently sold off for commercial development. The ground was hit by flooding in June 2007. The largest crowd to watch a county cricket match at the Town Ground is the 7,000 who attended the game against Yorkshire in 1966, though attendances for county matches typically averaged between 4,000–4,500.

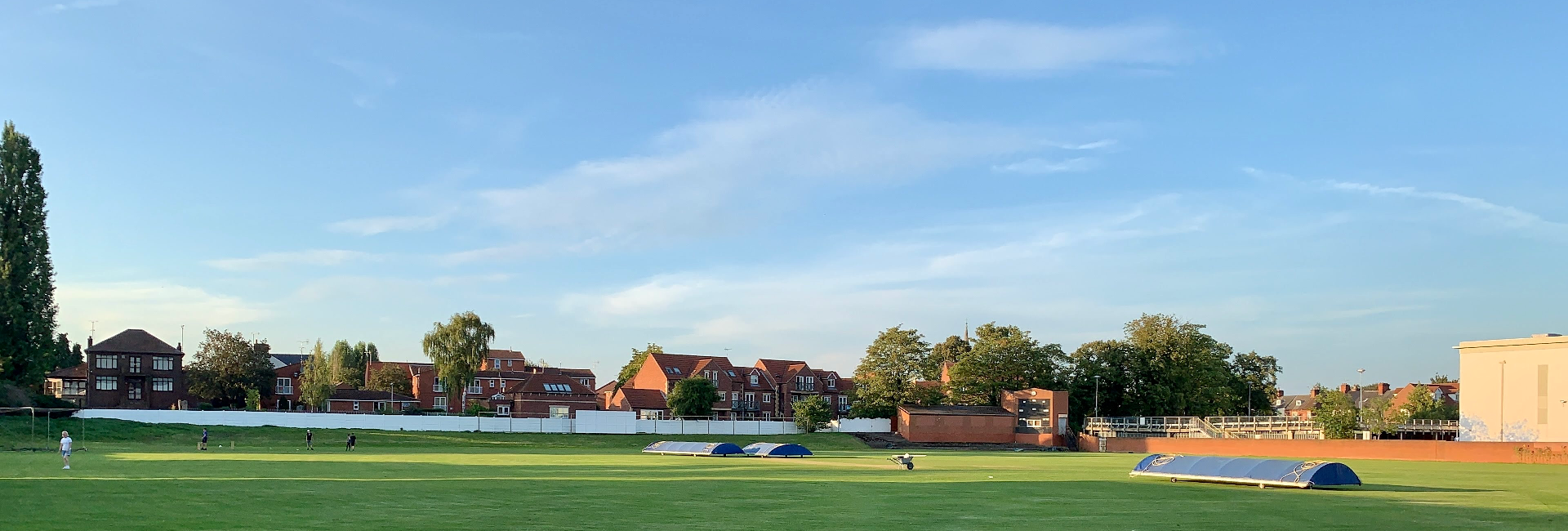
Wide view of the ground, looking toward the scoreboard

== Records ==
=== First-class ===
- Highest team total: 540 all out by Nottinghamshire v Worcestershire, 1934

- Nottinghamshire scored their runs in a single day.

- Lowest team total: 54 all out by Derbyshire v Nottinghamshire, 1980
- Highest individual innings: 235 by Steve James for Glamorgan v Nottinghamshire, 1996
- Best bowling in an innings: 8-84 by Fred Trueman for Yorkshire v Nottinghamshire, 1962
- Best bowling in a match: 12-130 by Fred Barratt for Nottinghamshire v Worcestershire, 1935

=== List A ===
- Highest team total: 273 for 4 (39 overs) by Sussex v Nottinghamshire, 1971
- Lowest team total: 125 for 8 (23 overs) by Nottinghamshire v Derbyshire, 1970
- Highest individual innings: 121 by Michael Buss for Sussex v Nottinghamshire, 1971
- Best bowling in an innings: 4-39 by David Halfyard for Nottinghamshire v Derbyshire, 1970
