= Providence Cowdrill =

English cricketer

Personal information
- Full name: Providence Ann Courtenay Cowdrill
- Born: 31 March 1999 (age 27); Frimley, Surrey, England
- Batting: Right-handed
- Bowling: Right-arm leg break
- Role: Bowler

Domestic team information
- Years: Team
- 2015–2020: Hampshire
- 2020: Southern Vipers

Career statistics
Competition	WLA	WT20
Matches	33	23
Runs scored	169	103
Batting average	14.08	25.75
100s/50s	0/0	0/0
Top score	33*	25
Balls bowled	1,082	383
Wickets	42	37
Bowling average	15.73	9.13
5 wickets in innings	0	1
10 wickets in match	0	0
Best bowling	4/19	6/27
Catches/stumpings	13/–	11/–
- Source: CricketArchive, 28 March 2021

Providence Ann Courtenay Cowdrill (born 31 March 1999) is an English cricketer who plays as a right-arm leg break bowler. She has played for Hampshire and Southern Vipers.

== Early life ==
Cowdrill was born on 31 March 1999 in Frimley, Surrey.

== Domestic career ==
Cowdrill made her county debut in 2015, for Hampshire against Devon, and took 3/7 from 1.5 overs. In 2016, she hit her Twenty20 high score, of 33* against Wales. In 2017, Cowdrill took 10 wickets at an average of 18.60 in the County Championship as Hampshire were promoted to Division 1. The following season, Cowdrill was the joint-leading wicket-taker across the whole competition in the Twenty20 Cup, with 15 wickets including 6/27 against Somerset, as well as taking 9 wickets as Hampshire won Division 1 of the County Championship. In 2019, she was Hampshire's leading wicket-taker in the Twenty20 Cup and joint-leading wicket-taker in the County Championship, with 12 wickets in each of the competitions.

In 2020, Cowdrill played for Southern Vipers in the Rachael Heyhoe Flint Trophy. She appeared in three matches as the side won the competition, taking 3 wickets at an average of 24.33.
