= Ravi Patel (cricketer) =

English cricketer (born 1991)

Personal information
- Full name: Ravi Hasmukh Patel
- Born: 4 August 1991 (age 35); Harrow, London, England
- Batting: Right-handed
- Bowling: Slow left-arm orthodox
- Role: Bowler

Domestic team information
- Years: Team
- 2010–2018: Middlesex County Cricket Club (squad no. 36)
- 2011: Loughborough MCCU
- 2015: → Essex (loan)
- FC debut: 25 May 2010 Middlesex v Oxford MCCU
- LA debut: 19 June 2010 Middlesex v Australians

Career statistics
Competition	FC	LA	T20
Matches	26	29	37
Runs scored	220	73	26
Batting average	10.47	12.16	8.66
100s/50s	0/0	0/0	0/0
Top score	26*	24*	12
Balls bowled	4,786	1,488	798
Wickets	81	36	36
Bowling average	31.46	35.88	27.83
5 wickets in innings	3	0	0
10 wickets in match	1	0	0
Best bowling	7/81	4/58	4/18
Catches/stumpings	7/–	2/–	7/–
- Source: Cricinfo, 24 August 2018

Ravi Hasmukh Patel (born 4 August 1991) is an English cricketer. Patel is a right-handed batsman who bowls slow left-arm orthodox. He was born in Harrow, London and educated at Merchant Taylors' School, Northwood.

Patel made his first-class debut for Middlesex against Oxford MCCU in 2010. In that same season he also made his List A debut against the touring Australians. In 2011, while studying for his degree in economics at Loughborough University, he played first-class cricket for Loughborough MCCU, making three appearances against Leicestershire and Kent.

His contract was not renewed by Middlesex following the 2018 season.

He now coaches at Harrow Saint Mary's Club.
