= Welbeck Abbey Cricket Ground =

Cricket ground in Nottinghamshire, England

Coordinates: 53.26044°N 1.15590°W

Ground information
- Location: Welbeck Abbey, Nottinghamshire
- Establishment: 1901 (first recorded match)

Team information
Nottinghamshire	(1901 & 1904)
- As of 30 August 2010; Source: Ground profile

Welbeck Abbey Cricket Ground is a cricket ground at Welbeck Abbey, Nottinghamshire. The county match on the ground was in 1901, when Nottinghamshire played Derbyshire in the grounds first first-class match. The ground held a further first-class match in 1904 when Nottinghamshire played Derbyshire.
