= 2018 T20 Blast =

2018 Vitality Blast
- Dates: 4 July 2018 – 15 September 2018
- Administrator: England and Wales Cricket Board
- Cricket format: Twenty20
- Tournament format(s): Group stage and knockout
- Champions: Worcestershire Rapids (1st title)
- Participants: 18
- Matches: 133
- Attendance: 931,455 (7,003 per match)
- Most runs: Laurie Evans (614)
- Most wickets: Pat Brown (31)
- Official website: Vitality Blast

The 2018 Vitality Blast was the sixteenth edition of the T20 Blast currently known as the Vitality Blast, a professional Twenty20 cricket league in England and Wales. It was the first season in which the domestic T20 competition, run by the ECB, has been branded as the Vitality Blast due to a new sponsorship deal. The league consisted of the 18 first-class county teams divided into two divisions of nine teams each with fixtures played between July and September. The final day took place at Edgbaston Cricket Ground in Birmingham on 15 September 2018.

Nottinghamshire Outlaws were the champions going into the tournament having beaten the Birmingham Bears by 22 runs in the 2017 final.

== Competition format ==
The 18 first-class county cricket clubs are taking part in the competition. Teams are initially split into two divisions on a geographical basis (North and South) for the group stage of the competition, each group having nine teams. During the group stage, which ran from July until the middle of August, each county played 14 matches, playing six of the other teams in their group twice, once home and once away, and the other two teams once. The winners of each match received two points for a win, with one point awarded in the case of a tie or if a match was abandoned. Teams are ranked within their groups by total points, then net run rate. At the end of the group stage, the top four teams from each group entered the knockout stage of the competition.

== North Group ==
=== Table ===
Pos	Team	Pld	W	L	T	NR	Ded	Pts	NRR
1	Worcestershire Rapids	14	9	4	0	1	0	19	0.595
2	Durham Jets	14	9	4	0	1	0	19	0.556
3	Lancashire Lightning	14	8	5	0	1	0	17	0.683
4	Nottinghamshire Outlaws	14	8	6	0	0	0	16	0.073
5	Yorkshire Vikings	14	7	7	0	0	0	14	−0.035
6	Birmingham Bears	14	6	7	1	0	0	13	0.033
7	Derbyshire Falcons	14	5	7	0	2	0	12	−0.047
8	Leicestershire Foxes	14	5	8	0	1	0	11	−0.380
9	Northamptonshire Steelbacks	14	2	11	1	0	0	5	−1.398

Source: BBC Sport

=== July ===
4 July 2018 (D/N)
Scorecard

Northamptonshire Steelbacks; 218/3 (20 overs)	v	Leicestershire Foxes; 219/6 (19.4 overs)
Ben Duckett 96 (54); Callum Parkinson 1/25 (3 overs)		Colin Ackermann 66* (31); Ben Sanderson 2/47 (4 overs)

Leicestershire Foxes won by 4 wickets
County Ground, Northampton
Umpires: David Millns and Jeff Evans
Player of the match: Ben Duckett (Northants Steelbacks)

- Leicestershire Foxes won the toss and elected to field.

4 July 2018 (D/N)
Scorecard

Nottinghamshire Outlaws; 155/7 (20 overs)	v	Birmingham Bears; 159/2 (17.2 overs)
Riki Wessels 41 (29); Colin de Grandhomme 2/24 (4 overs)		Ian Bell 82* (57); Harry Gurney 1/26 (2.2 overs)

Birmingham Bears won by 8 wickets
Trent Bridge, Nottingham
Umpires: Mike Burns and Steve O'Shaughnessy
Player of the match: Ian Bell (Birmingham Bears)

- Birmingham Bears won the toss and elected to field.
- Henry Brookes (Birmingham Bears) made his T20 debut

5 July 2018 (D/N)
Scorecard

Yorkshire Vikings; 200/3 (20 overs)	v	Durham Jets; 156/4 (20 overs)
Adam Lyth 92* (54); Ryan Pringle 1/17 (2 overs)		Ben Stokes 90* (68); Jack Brooks 3/21 (4 overs)

Yorkshire Vikings won by 44 runs
Headingley, Leeds
Umpires: Jeff Evans and Paul Baldwin
Player of the match: Adam Lyth (Yorkshire Vikings)

- Durham Jets won the toss and elected to field.
- Harry Brook and Jonny Tattersall (Yorkshire Vikings) made their T20 debuts

5 July 2018 (D/N)
Scorecard

Lancashire Lightning; 188/6 (20 overs)	v	Worcestershire Rapids; 190/5 (19.5 overs)
Keaton Jennings 50 (33); George Rhodes 2/27 (3 overs)		Joe Clarke 42 (24); Jordan Clark 2/26 (2.5 overs)

Worcestershire Rapids won by 5 wickets
Old Trafford, Manchester
Umpires: Mike Burns and Peter Hartley
Player of the match: Brett D'Oliveira (Worcestershire Rapids)

- Lancashire Lightning won the toss and elected to bat.

6 July 2018 (D/N)
Scorecard

Worcestershire Rapids; 192/7 (20 overs)	v	Birmingham Bears; 188/9 (20 overs)
Martin Guptill 51 (40); Henry Brookes 2/28 (4 overs)		Sam Hain 70 (44); Pat Brown 3/28 (4 overs)

Worcestershire Rapids won by 4 runs
New Road, Worcester
Umpires: Jeff Evans and Paul Pollard
Player of the match: Pat Brown (Worcestershire Rapids)

- Birmingham Bears won the toss and elected to field.

6 July 2018 (D/N)
Scorecard

Nottinghamshire Outlaws; 219/6 (20 overs)	v	Northamptonshire Steelbacks; 161 (17.3 overs)
Dan Christian 113* (40); Ben Sanderson 2/41 (4 overs)		Ben Duckett 88 (45); Luke Fletcher 3/21 (3 overs)

Nottinghamshire Outlaws won by 58 runs
County Ground, Northampton
Umpires: Graham Lloyd and Paul Baldwin
Player of the match: Dan Christian (Nottinghamshire Outlaws)

- Northamptonshire Steelbacks won the toss and elected to field.
- Will Fraine (Nottinghamshire Outlaws) made his T20 debut

6 July 2018 (D/N)
Scorecard

Durham Jets; 153/7 (20 overs)	v	Leicestershire Foxes; 120 (18.3 overs)
Paul Collingwood 36 (33); Zak Chappell 3/23 (4 overs)		Neil Dexter 35 (32); Imran Tahir 4/14 (4 overs)

Durham Jets won by 33 runs
Grace Road, Leicester
Umpires: Ben Debenham and Peter Hartley
Player of the match: Imran Tahir (Durham Jets)

- Leicestershire Foxes won the toss and elected to field.

== South Group ==
=== Table ===
Pos	Team	Pld	W	L	T	NR	Ded	Pts	NRR
1	Somerset	14	10	4	0	0	0	20	0.786
2	Kent Spitfires	14	8	2	0	4	0	20	0.627
3	Sussex Sharks	14	7	3	0	4	0	18	0.737
4	Gloucestershire	14	8	4	0	2	0	18	0.381
5	Surrey	14	7	5	0	2	0	16	0.989
6	Glamorgan	14	7	6	0	1	0	15	−0.144
7	Essex Eagles	14	2	8	1	3	0	8	−1.035
8	Hampshire	14	2	9	1	2	0	7	−0.824
9	Middlesex	14	2	12	0	0	0	4	−1.128

Source: BBC Sport

=== July ===
4 July 2018 (D/N)
Scorecard

Sussex Sharks; 181/6 (20 overs)	v	Essex Eagles; 145 (19.4 overs)
Laurie Evans 61 (45); Jamie Porter 2/26 (4 overs)		Varun Chopra 64 (48); David Wiese 5/24 (4 overs)

Sussex Sharks won by 36 runs
County Ground, Chelmsford
Umpires: Ben Debenham and Graham Lloyd
Player of the match: David Wiese (Sussex Sharks)

- Sussex Sharks won the toss and elected to bat.
- Sam Cook (Essex Eagles) made his T20 debut

5 July 2018 (D/N)
Scorecard

Surrey; 158/6 (20 overs)	v	Middlesex; 161/7 (19 overs)
Rikki Clarke 50 (25); Paul Stirling 3/26 (4 overs)		Paul Stirling 66 (36); Gareth Batty 2/18 (4 overs)

Middlesex won by 3 wickets
Lord's, London
Umpires: David Millns and Neil Bainton
Player of the match: Paul Stirling (Middlesex)

- Surrey won the toss and elected to bat.
- Jamie Smith and Will Jacks (Surrey) made their T20 debuts

== Knockout stage ==
Quarter-finals
N1	Worcestershire Rapids	137/5
S4	Gloucestershire	136/8
N3	Lancashire Lightning	134/4
S2	Kent Spitfires	133/9
N2	Durham Jets	140/7
S3	Sussex Sharks	144/5
N4	Nottinghamshire Outlaws	190
S1	Somerset	209/5

Semi-finals
N1	Worcestershire Rapids	169/6
N3	Lancashire Lightning	149/9
S3	Sussex Sharks	202/8
S1	Somerset	167/8

Final
N1	Worcestershire Rapids	158/5
S3	Sussex Sharks	157/6

=== Quarter-finals ===
23 August (D/N)
Scorecard

Kent Spitfires (H); 133/9 (20 overs)	v	Lancashire Lightning; 134/4 (18.4 overs)
Sam Billings 37 (37); Matt Parkinson 3/27 (4 overs)		Keaton Jennings 46 (40); Imran Qayyum 2/17 (4 overs)

Lancashire Lightning won by 6 wickets
St Lawrence Ground, Canterbury
Umpires: Mike Burns (Eng) and Alex Wharf (Eng)
Player of the match: Matt Parkinson (Lancashire Lightning)

- Kent Spitfires won the toss and elected to bat.

24 August (D/N)
Scorecard

Durham Jets (H); 140/7 (20 overs)	v	Sussex Sharks; 144/5 (18.2 overs)
Ben Stokes 34 (24); Will Beer 2/17 (4 overs)		Laurie Evans 63* (47); Mark Wood 2/25 (4 overs)

Sussex Sharks won by 5 wickets
Riverside Ground, Chester-le-Street
Umpires: David Millns (Eng) and Martin Saggers (Eng)
Player of the match: Laurie Evans (Sussex Sharks)

- Durham Jets won the toss and elected to bat.

25 August
Scorecard

Gloucestershire; 136/8 (20 overs)	v	Worcestershire Rapids (H); 137/5 (18.4 overs)
Miles Hammond 45 (31); Brett D'Oliveira 4/26 (4 overs)		Callum Ferguson 64* (47); Benny Howell 2/22 (4 overs)

Worcestershire Rapids won by 5 wickets
New Road, Worcester
Umpires: Nick Cook (Eng) and Graham Lloyd (Eng)
Player of the match: Callum Ferguson (Worcestershire Rapids)

- Worcestershire Rapids won the toss and elected to field.

26–27 August
Scorecard

Somerset (H); 209/5 (20 overs)	v	Nottinghamshire Outlaws; 190 (20 overs)
Lewis Gregory 60* (24); Samit Patel 1/16 (3 overs)		Alex Hales 45 (28); Jamie Overton 5/47 (4 overs)

Somerset won by 19 runs
County Ground, Taunton
Umpires: Neil Mallender (Eng) and Steve O'Shaughnessy (Eng)
Player of the match: Lewis Gregory (Somerset)

- Nottinghamshire Outlaws won the toss and elected to field.

== Finals Day ==
=== Semi-finals ===
15 September
11:00
Scorecard

Worcestershire Rapids; 169/6 (20 overs)	v	Lancashire Lightning; 149/9 (20 overs)
Ben Cox 55* (34); Matt Parkinson 2/23 (4 overs)		Keaton Jennings 51* (40); Patrick Brown 4/21 (4 overs)

Worcestershire Rapids won by 20 runs
Edgbaston, Birmingham
Umpires: David Millns (Eng) and Martin Saggers (Eng)
Player of the match: Ben Cox (Worcestershire Rapids)

- Lancashire Lightning won the toss and elected to field.

15 September
14:30
Scorecard

Sussex Sharks; 202/8 (20 overs)	v	Somerset; 167/8 (20 overs)
Luke Wright 92 (53); Jerome Taylor 4/20 (4 overs)		Tom Abell 48 (29); Jofra Archer 3/32 (4 overs)

Sussex Sharks won by 35 runs
Edgbaston, Birmingham
Umpires: Mike Burns (Eng) and Alex Wharf (Eng)
Player of the match: Luke Wright (Sussex Sharks)

- Sussex Sharks won the toss and elected to bat.

=== Final ===
15 September
18:45 (D/N)
Scorecard

Sussex Sharks; 157/6 (20 overs)	v	Worcestershire Rapids; 158/5 (18.3 overs)
Laurie Evans 52 (44); Moeen Ali 3/30 (4 overs)		Ben Cox 46* (27); Danny Briggs 2/19 (4 overs)

Worcestershire Rapids won by 5 wickets
Edgbaston, Birmingham, Warwickshire
Umpires: Martin Saggers (Eng) and Alex Wharf (Eng)
Player of the match: Ben Cox (Worcestershire Rapids)

- Sussex Sharks won the toss and elected to bat.

== Personnel ==
Team	Coach	Captain	Overseas player(s)
Birmingham Bears	(England) Jim Troughton	(New Zealand) Grant Elliott	(New Zealand) Jeetan Patel (New Zealand) Colin de Grandhomme
Derbyshire Falcons	(New Zealand) John Wright	(Ireland) Gary Wilson	(Pakistan) Wahab Riaz (New Zealand) Lockie Ferguson (New Zealand) Henry Nicholls
Durham Jets	(England) Jon Lewis	(New Zealand) Tom Latham	(New Zealand) Tom Latham (South Africa) Imran Tahir
Essex Eagles	(England) Anthony McGrath	(Netherlands) Ryan ten Doeschate	(New Zealand) Neil Wagner (Australia) Adam Zampa (Australia) Peter Siddle
Glamorgan	(Wales) Robert Croft	(South Africa) Colin Ingram	(Australia) Usman Khawaja (Australia) Shaun Marsh (Australia) Joe Burns
Gloucestershire	(England) Richard Dawson	(Australia) Michael Klinger	(Australia) Michael Klinger (Australia) Andrew Tye (Sri Lanka) Thisara Perera
Hampshire	(England) Craig White	(England) James Vince	(New Zealand) Colin Munro (Afghanistan) Mujeeb Ur Rahman (South Africa) Dale Steyn
Kent Spitfires	(England) Matt Walker	(England) Sam Billings	(New Zealand) Adam Milne (Australia) Marcus Stoinis (Cricket West Indies) Carlos Brathwaite
Lancashire Lightning	(England) Glen Chapple	(England) Liam Livingstone	(Australia) Joe Mennie (Australia) James Faulkner (Afghanistan) Zahir Khan
Leicestershire Foxes	(England) Paul Nixon	(South Africa) Colin Ackermann	(Pakistan) Mohammad Abbas (Afghanistan) Mohammad Nabi
Middlesex	(New Zealand) Daniel Vettori	(England) Dawid Malan	(Australia) Hilton Cartwright (Australia) Ashton Agar (Cricket West Indies) Dwayne Bravo
Northamptonshire Steelbacks	(England) David Ripley	(England) Alex Wakely	(South Africa) Rory Kleinveldt (Sri Lanka) Seekuge Prasanna
Nottinghamshire Outlaws	(England) Peter Moores	(Australia) Dan Christian	(Australia) Dan Christian (New Zealand) Ish Sodhi
Somerset	(England) Andy Hurry	(England) Lewis Gregory	(New Zealand) Corey Anderson (Cricket West Indies) Jerome Taylor
Surrey	(Australia) Michael Di Venuto	(England) Jade Dernbach	(Australia) Aaron Finch (Australia) Nic Maddinson
Sussex Sharks	(Australia) Jason Gillespie	(England) Luke Wright	(Afghanistan) Rashid Khan (New Zealand) Tom Bruce
Worcestershire Rapids	(England) Kevin Sharp	(England) Moeen Ali	(Australia) Travis Head (New Zealand) Martin Guptill (Australia) Callum Ferguson (South Africa) Wayne Parnell
Yorkshire Vikings	(England) Andrew Gale	(England) Steven Patterson	(New Zealand) Kane Williamson

== Statistics ==
=== Most runs ===
Player	Team	Mat	Inns	Runs	SR	HS	100	50
Laurie Evans	Sussex Sharks	15	14	614	135.84	96	0	7
Aaron Finch	Surrey	9	9	589	182.35	131*	2	3
Ian Bell	Birmingham Bears	14	14	580	139.09	131	1	4
Source: ESPNCricInfo								

=== Most wickets ===
Player	Team	Mat	Wkts	Ave	Econ	BBI	SR
Pat Brown	Worcestershire Rapids	16	31	13.35	7.64	4/21	10.4
Matthew Parkinson	Lancashire Lightning	15	25	16.60	7.32	3/19	13.6
Jamie Overton	Somerset	16	24	22.50	10.25	5/47	13.1
Source: ESPNCricinfo
