= 2016 County Championship =

English cricket tournament

- Tournament logo
- Dates: 10 April – 23 September 2016
- Administrator: England and Wales Cricket Board
- Cricket format: First-class cricket (4 days)
- Tournament format: League system
- Champions: Middlesex
- Participants: 18
- Most runs: Keaton Jennings (1,548) (Div 1); Ben Duckett (1,338) (Div 2)
- Most wickets: Jeetan Patel (69) (Div 1); Joe Leach (65) (Div 2)

The 2016 County Championship (known for sponsorship reasons as the 2016 Specsavers County Championship), was the 117th cricket County Championship season. It was announced in March 2016 that the 2017 season would feature only eight teams in Division One, meaning that only one team would be promoted from Division Two in the 2016 season, whilst two teams were relegated from Division One.

The season saw a significant change in playing regulations where instead of a mandatory coin toss to determine choice of batting or bowling first, the visiting team was allowed to choose to bowl first if they desired. This change was introduced by the ECB cricket committee in November 2015 as a response to concerns raised about the standard of pitches, particularly in Division Two of the Championship. The initiative attempted to reduce the preparation of seamer friendly wickets which had seen matches completed quickly, made batting harder early in matches and generally gave an advantage to the team bowling first. By encouraging Counties to produce more balanced wickets the initiative aimed to promote the skills required in Test cricket, in particular aiding the development of spin bowling and promoting more patient batting.

Tougher penalties for poor pitches and the use of the new regulations just in Division Two of the Championship had been considered by the ECB, but the committee opted to implement the change across both divisions in 2016. On the opening day of the 2016 season, four captains opted to bowl first with the choice of batting or bowling being decided by a toss in just one match.

== Teams ==
The 2016 Championship was divided into two divisions of nine teams each. Each county played every other team in their division twice with matches lasting four days - once at home and once away. At the end of the season one county was promoted from Division Two and two relegated from Division One in order to create a smaller Division One and a bigger Division Two in 2017.

Home grounds of each County.

=== Division One ===
Team promoted from Division Two

Team	Primary home ground	Other grounds	Coach	Captain	Overseas player(s)	Refs
Durham	Riverside Ground, Chester-le-Street	—	(England) Jon Lewis	(England) Paul Collingwood	—	
Hampshire	Rose Bowl, Southampton	—	(South Africa) Dale Benkenstein (Apr–Jul) (England) Craig White (Jul–Sep)	(England) James Vince	(South Africa) Ryan McLaren	
Lancashire	Old Trafford, Manchester	—	(England) Ashley Giles	(England) Steven Croft	(New Zealand) Neil Wagner (May–Jul)	
Middlesex	Lord's, London	Merchant Taylors' School Ground, Northwood; Uxbridge Cricket Club Ground, Uxbridge	(England) Richard Scott	(Australia) Adam Voges (Apr–May) (New Zealand) James Franklin (May–Sep)	(Australia) Adam Voges (Apr–May) (Australia) George Bailey (Jul–Aug)	
Nottinghamshire	Trent Bridge, Nottingham	—	(England) Mick Newell	(England) Chris Read	(Australia) Jackson Bird (Apr–Jul) (South Africa) Imran Tahir (Jul–Sep)	
Somerset	County Ground, Taunton	—	(England) Matthew Maynard	(Australia) Chris Rogers	(Australia) Chris Rogers	
Surrey	The Oval, London	Woodbridge Road, Guildford	(Australia) Michael Di Venuto	(England) Gareth Batty	(Sri Lanka) Kumar Sangakkara (Australia) Aaron Finch (Jul)	
Warwickshire	Edgbaston, Birmingham	—	(Scotland) Dougie Brown	(England) Ian Bell	(New Zealand) Jeetan Patel	
Yorkshire	Headingley, Leeds	North Marine Road Ground, Scarborough	(Australia) Jason Gillespie	(England) Andrew Gale	(New Zealand) Kane Williamson (Jun–Jul) (Australia) Travis Head (Aug) (Australia) Jake Lehmann (Aug–Sep)	

=== Division Two ===
Team relegated from Division One

Team	Primary home ground	Other grounds	Coach	Captain	Overseas player(s)	Refs
Derbyshire	County Ground, Derby	Queen's Park, Chesterfield	(England) Graeme Welch (Apr–Jun)	(England) Billy Godleman	(New Zealand) Hamish Rutherford	
Essex	County Ground, Chelmsford	Castle Park Cricket Ground, Colchester	(England) Chris Silverwood	(Netherlands) Ryan ten Doeschate	(New Zealand) Jesse Ryder	
Glamorgan	SWALEC Stadium, Cardiff	Penrhyn Avenue, Rhos-on-Sea; St Helen's, Swansea	(Wales) Robert Croft	(South Africa) Jacques Rudolph	(South Africa) Jacques Rudolph	
Gloucestershire	County Ground, Bristol	College Ground, Cheltenham	(England) Richard Dawson	(South Africa) Gareth Roderick	(Australia) Cameron Bancroft (Apr–May) (Australia) Michael Klinger (May–Sep)	
Kent	St Lawrence Ground, Canterbury	Kent County Cricket Ground, Beckenham; Nevill Ground, Tunbridge Wells	(Cricket West Indies) Jimmy Adams	(England) Sam Northeast	(New Zealand) Tom Latham (South Africa) Kagiso Rabada (Jul)	
Leicestershire	Grace Road, Leicester	—	(Australia) Andrew McDonald	(Australia) Mark Cosgrove	(Australia) Clint McKay	
Northamptonshire	County Ground, Northampton	—	(England) David Ripley	(England) Alex Wakely	(South Africa) Rory Kleinveldt (Sri Lanka) Seekkuge Prasanna (May–Jul)	
Sussex	County Ground, Hove	Arundel Castle Cricket Club Ground, Arundel	(South Africa) Mark Davis	(England) Luke Wright	(New Zealand) Ross Taylor	
Worcestershire	New Road, Worcester	—	(England) Steve Rhodes	(England) Daryl Mitchell	(New Zealand) Matt Henry (Apr–Jun) (South Africa) Kyle Abbott (Jul–Sep)	

== Standings ==
Teams receive 16 points for a win, 8 for a tie and 5 for a draw. Bonus points (a maximum of 5 batting points and 3 bowling points) may be scored during the first 110 overs of each team's first innings.

=== Division One ===
Team	Pld	W	L	T	D	A	Bat	Bowl	Ded	Pts
Middlesex (C)	16	6	0	0	10	0	48	40	4	230
Somerset	16	6	1	0	9	0	44	41	0	226
Yorkshire	16	5	3	0	8	0	49	42	0	211
Durham (R)	16	5	3	0	8	0	39	41	0	200
Surrey	16	4	6	0	6	0	46	42	0	182
Warwickshire	16	3	4	0	9	0	39	44	0	176
Lancashire	16	3	5	0	8	0	39	38	0	165
Hampshire	16	2	4	0	10	0	41	35	3	155
Nottinghamshire (R)	16	1	9	0	6	0	34	44	0	124

=== Division Two ===
Team	Pld	W	L	T	D	A	Bat	Bowl	Ded	Pts
Essex (P)	16	6	3	0	7	0	58	46	0	235
Kent	16	5	2	0	8	1	49	38	0	212
Worcestershire	16	6	4	0	5	1	42	35	0	203
Sussex	16	4	2	0	10	0	40	38	0	192
Northamptonshire	16	4	3	0	8	1	42	33	0	184
Gloucestershire	16	4	5	0	7	0	44	40	0	183
Leicestershire	16	4	4	0	8	0	39	40	1	182
Glamorgan	16	3	8	0	5	0	34	42	1	148
Derbyshire	16	0	5	0	10	1	32	32	0	119

== Fixtures ==
The fixture list for the 2016 season was announced in December 2015.

=== Division One ===
==== April ====
10–13 April	(H) Durham	v	Somerset	Match drawn
Scorecard	256 (81.4 overs); KK Jennings 116 (228); L Gregory 4/58 (17.4 overs)		179 (48.1 overs); PD Trego 45 (57); G Onions 4/62 (19 overs)	Riverside Ground, Chester-le-Street; Umpires: Rob Bailey and Nigel Cowley
Scorecard	223/4 (57 overs); KK Jennings 105* (168); L Gregory 2/54 (12 overs)			Riverside Ground, Chester-le-Street; Umpires: Rob Bailey and Nigel Cowley
No toss, Somerset elected to field; No play on Days 3 and 4 due to rain; Points: Durham 10, Somerset 8

10–13 April	(H) Hampshire	v	Warwickshire	Match drawn
Scorecard	202 (79.2 overs); R McLaren 85 (154); KHD Barker 5/53 (18 overs)		360 (106.4 overs); IR Bell 174 (285); JA Tomlinson 3/79 (21.4 overs)	The Rose Bowl, Southampton; Umpires: Steve O'Shaughnessy and Martin Saggers
Scorecard	185/5 (71.5 overs); LA Dawson 50* (120); KHD Barker 2/33 (15 overs)			The Rose Bowl, Southampton; Umpires: Steve O'Shaughnessy and Martin Saggers
No toss, Warwickshire elected to field; No play on Day 2 due to rain; Points: Warwickshire 12, Hampshire 9

10–13 April	(H) Nottinghamshire	v	Surrey	Nottinghamshire won by 3 wickets
Scorecard	446 (91.4 overs); SJ Mullaney 113 (114); R Rampaul 5/93 (16.4 overs)		225 (67.1 overs); BT Foakes 38 (66); JM Bird 4/56 (17.1 overs)	Trent Bridge, Nottingham; Umpires: David Millns and Tim Robinson
Scorecard	172/7 (42.4 overs); GP Smith 54 (103); TK Curran 4/58 (16 overs)		389 (99.4 overs) (f/o); A Harinath 137 (270); JT Ball 5/98 (23 overs)	Trent Bridge, Nottingham; Umpires: David Millns and Tim Robinson
No toss, Surrey elected to field; Points: Nottinghamshire 24, Surrey 4

17–20 April	Nottinghamshire	v	Lancashire (H)	Lancashire won by 8 wickets
Scorecard	242 (74.2 overs); CMW Read 52 (108); N Wagner 6/66 (20.2 overs)		332 (121.1 overs); LS Livingstone 70 (124); JT Ball 4/63 (26 overs)	Old Trafford, Manchester; Umpires: Richard Illingworth and Neil Mallender
Scorecard	175 (84.5 overs); GP Smith 41 (131); N Wagner 5/45 (19 overs)		88/2 (17 overs); LA Procter 35* (45); JT Ball 2/29 (6 overs)	Old Trafford, Manchester; Umpires: Richard Illingworth and Neil Mallender
Nottinghamshire won the toss and elected to bat; Points: Lancashire 22, Nottinghamshire 3 Liam Livingstone (Lancashire) made his first-class debut.

17–20 April	(H) Middlesex	v	Warwickshire	Match drawn
Scorecard	452 (131.5 overs); SD Robson 231 (345); JS Patel 4/80 (20.5 overs)		468 (112.2 overs); IJL Trott 219* (289); TJ Murtagh 3/68 (22 overs)	Lord's, London; Umpires: Peter Hartley and Richard Kettleborough
Scorecard	304/6d (104.5 overs); SD Robson 106 (195); KHD Barker 2/27 (13 overs)			Lord's, London; Umpires: Peter Hartley and Richard Kettleborough
No toss, Warwickshire elected to field; Points: Middlesex 12, Warwickshire 11

17–20 April	(H) Yorkshire	v	Hampshire	Match drawn
Scorecard	593/9d (118 overs); JM Bairstow 246 (270); TP Alsop 2/59 (8 overs)		453/9d (152.4 overs); SM Ervine 123 (259); RJ Sidebottom 4/80 (27.4 overs)	Headingley, Leeds; Umpires: Stephen Gale and Nigel Llong
Scorecard	183/8d (68.3 overs); AW Gale 46 (97); JA Tomlinson 3/31 (16 overs)			Headingley, Leeds; Umpires: Stephen Gale and Nigel Llong
No toss, Hampshire elected to field; Points: Yorkshire 12, Hampshire 10

24–27 April	Middlesex	v	Durham (H)	Match drawn
Scorecard	389 (103.1 overs); DJ Malan 74 (112); BA Stokes 4/80 (25.1 overs)		305/4 (86.3 overs); MD Stoneman 141* (223); ST Finn 3/64 (18 overs)	Riverside Ground, Chester-le-Street; Umpires: Ian Gould and Graham Lloyd
Middlesex won the toss and elected to bat; No play on Day 3, and only 2.2 overs possible on Day 4 due to rain and snow; Points: Durham 11, Middlesex 10

24–27 April	(H) Surrey	v	Somerset	Match drawn
Scorecard	463 (109.5 overs); KC Sangakkara 171 (176); TD Groenewald 5/94 (23.5 overs)		353 (98.3 overs); ME Trescothick 127 (213); R Rampaul 5/85 (24 overs)	The Oval, London; Umpires: Paul Baldwin and Richard Illingworth
Scorecard	181/8d (53.3 overs); KC Sangakkara 71 (108); L Gregory 3/24 (10.3 overs)		122/4 (35 overs); JC Hildreth 40* (64); ZS Ansari 3/43 (13 overs)	The Oval, London; Umpires: Paul Baldwin and Richard Illingworth
Surrey won the toss and elected to bat; Points: Surrey 13, Somerset 12

24–27 April	Yorkshire	v	Warwickshire (H)	Match drawn
Scorecard	379 (108 overs); GS Ballance 68 (161); CR Woakes 4/87 (28 overs)		443/9d (117 overs); V Chopra 107 (182); AU Rashid 4/127 (31 overs)	Edgbaston, Birmingham; Umpires: Nigel Cowley and Jeremy Lloyds
Scorecard	73/2d (22 overs); GS Ballance 21* (51); WB Rankin 1/18 (6 overs)			Edgbaston, Birmingham; Umpires: Nigel Cowley and Jeremy Lloyds
Yorkshire won the toss and elected to bat; Play reduced on Days 1, 2 and 3 due to rain and snow; Points: Warwickshire 13, Yorkshire 11

==== May ====
1–4 May	Hampshire (H)	v	Middlesex	Match drawn
Scorecard	336 (104 overs); MA Carberry 107 (211); TJ Murtagh 3/64 (27 overs)		361 (104.5 overs); DJ Malan 121 (168); JA Tomlinson 4/74 (20.3 overs)	The Rose Bowl, Southampton; Umpires: Nigel Cowley and Tim Robinson
Scorecard	290/5d (88 overs); JHK Adams 70 (164); TJ Murtagh 2/39 (16 overs)		55/2 (15 overs); DJ Malan 24* (30); JA Tomlinson 1/13 (5 overs)	The Rose Bowl, Southampton; Umpires: Nigel Cowley and Tim Robinson
No toss, Middlesex elected to field; Only 41 overs possible on Day 2 due to rain; Points: Middlesex 12, Hampshire 11

1–4 May	Nottinghamshire (H)	v	Yorkshire	Match drawn
Scorecard	261 (69.2 overs); SJ Mullaney 78 (80); JA Brooks 4/74 (16 overs)		290 (76.2 overs); AZ Lees 92 (134); JT Ball 4/57 (18 overs)	Trent Bridge, Nottingham; Umpires: Michael Gough and Richard Kettleborough; Player of the match: Alex Lees (Yorkshire)
Scorecard	348 (100.3 overs); CMW Read 101 (179); SA Patterson 4/57 (23.3 overs)		257/9 (53 overs); AZ Lees 107 (123); HF Gurney 4/53 (16 overs)	Trent Bridge, Nottingham; Umpires: Michael Gough and Richard Kettleborough; Player of the match: Alex Lees (Yorkshire)
No toss, Yorkshire elected to field; Play reduced on Day 1 due to bad light and on Day 2 due to rain; Points: Nottinghamshire 10, Yorkshire 10

1–4 May	Lancashire	v	Somerset (H)	Match drawn
Scorecard	493/9d (151 overs); LS Livingstone 108* (152); RE van der Merwe 3/87 (23 overs)		313 (98.2 overs); JC Hildreth 130 (204); SC Kerrigan 3/63 (34 overs)	County Ground, Taunton; Umpires: Jeff Evans and Alex Wharf
Scorecard			229/2d (86 overs) (f/o); ME Trescothick 129* (254); KM Jarvis 1/26 (11 overs)	County Ground, Taunton; Umpires: Jeff Evans and Alex Wharf
Lancashire won the toss and elected to bat; Play reduced on Day 1 due to bad light and on Day 2 due to rain; Points: Lancashire 11, Somerset 9

1–4 May	Surrey (H)	v	Durham	Match drawn
Scorecard	457 (119.4 overs); A Harinath 96 (188); BA Stokes 4/117 (33.4 overs)		607/7d (153 overs); JTA Burnham 135 (215); TK Curran 2/105 (30 overs)	The Oval, London; Umpires: Steve O'Shaughnessy and Billy Taylor
Scorecard	244/6 (75 overs); TK Curran 54 (94); BA Stokes 3/69 (21 overs)			The Oval, London; Umpires: Steve O'Shaughnessy and Billy Taylor
Surrey won the toss and elected to bat; Points: Durham 12, Surrey 11

8–11 May	Hampshire	v	Lancashire (H)	Lancashire won by an innings and 94 runs
Scorecard	109 (48.3 overs); AJA Wheater 32 (64); LA Procter 3/14 (8.3 overs)		456 (124.2 overs); LA Procter 137 (305); TL Best 5/90 (20 overs)	Old Trafford, Manchester; Umpires: Michael Gough and Nigel Llong
Scorecard	253 (120 overs); AJA Wheater 47 (116); SC Kerrigan 5/59 (36 overs)			Old Trafford, Manchester; Umpires: Michael Gough and Nigel Llong
Hampshire won the toss and elected to bat.; Points: Lancashire 23, Hampshire 1

8–11 May	Nottinghamshire	v	Middlesex (H)	Match drawn
Scorecard	354 (100 overs); SR Patel 86 (138); TS Roland-Jones 5/61 (22 overs)		203/3 (62.2 overs); SD Robson 114* (206); BA Hutton 2/47 (14 overs)	Lord's, London; Umpires: Rob Bailey and Billy Taylor
Nottinghamshire won the toss and elected to bat.; No play on Days 3 and 4 due to rain; Points: Nottinghamshire 10, Middlesex 9

8–11 May	Somerset	v	Warwickshire (H)	Match drawn
Scorecard	295 (86.3 overs); TB Abell 104 (180); KHD Barker 3/54 (19 overs)		152 (49.4 overs); V Chopra 56 (117); J Overton 3/24 (8 overs)	Edgbaston, Birmingham; Umpires: Ian Gould and Neil Mallender
Scorecard	178 (46.5 overs); PD Trego 51 (58); WB Rankin 3/33 (8 overs)		4/0 (2 overs); IJ Westwood 4* (6)	Edgbaston, Birmingham; Umpires: Ian Gould and Neil Mallender
Somerset won the toss and elected to bat.; No play on Days 3 and 4 due to rain; Points: Somerset 10, Warwickshire 8

8–11 May	Surrey	v	Yorkshire (H)	Yorkshire won by an innings and 20 runs
Scorecard	330 (91.4 overs); SM Davies 117 (163); DJ Willey 3/55 (20 overs)		557/6d (111.2 overs); JE Root 213 (242); R Rampaul 4/153 (32.2 overs)	Headingley, Leeds; Umpires: Steve Garratt and Alex Wharf
Scorecard	207 (73.1 overs); KC Sangakkara 61 (90); SA Patterson 3/15 (9 overs)			Headingley, Leeds; Umpires: Steve Garratt and Alex Wharf
Surrey won the toss and elected to bat.; Only 13.2 overs possible on Day 3 due to rain; Points: Yorkshire 24, Surrey 5

15–18 May	(H) Durham	v	Lancashire	Durham won by 73 runs
Scorecard	411 (117 overs); SG Borthwick 134 (221); TE Bailey 5/110 (31 overs)		326 (106.4 overs); H Hameed 74 (181); BJ McCarthy 5/70 (22 overs)	Riverside Ground, Chester-le-Street; Umpires: Stephen Gale and Richard Kettleborough
Scorecard	239/4d (60 overs); SG Borthwick 103* (165); KM Jarvis 1/47 (14 overs)		251 (67 overs); LS Livingstone 60* (105); BA Carse 3/38 (15 overs)	Riverside Ground, Chester-le-Street; Umpires: Stephen Gale and Richard Kettleborough
Durham won the toss and elected to bat.; Points: Durham 23, Lancashire 6

15–18 May	Warwickshire	v	Nottinghamshire (H)	Warwickshire won by 53 runs
Scorecard	373 (98 overs); CR Woakes 121 (187); LJ Fletcher 3/70 (20 overs)		383 (109 overs); MJ Lumb 108 (193); R Clarke 4/72 (24 overs)	Trent Bridge, Nottingham; Umpires: Russell Evans and David Millns
Scorecard	236 (67 overs); V Chopra 82 (115); LJ Fletcher 4/25 (16 overs)		173 (36.4 overs); SR Patel 124 (82); KHD Barker 4/38 (11 overs)	Trent Bridge, Nottingham; Umpires: Russell Evans and David Millns
Warwickshire won the toss and elected to bat.; Play reduced on Day 4 due to rain; Points: Warwickshire 23, Nottinghamshire 7

15–18 May	(H) Somerset	v	Yorkshire	Match drawn
Scorecard	562/7d (138.2 overs); JC Hildreth 166 (237); AU Rashid 4/160 (34 overs)		311 (113.1 overs); A Lyth 106 (180); TD Groenewald 3/54 (20 overs)	County Ground, Taunton; Umpires: Steve O'Shaughnessy and Billy Taylor
Scorecard			141/6 (71.4 overs) (f/o); JA Leaning 29* (74); J Overton 3/26 (17 overs)	County Ground, Taunton; Umpires: Steve O'Shaughnessy and Billy Taylor
No toss, Yorkshire elected to field.; 55 overs lost on Days 3 and 4 due to rain; Points: Somerset 12, Yorkshire 9

15–18 May	Middlesex	v	Surrey (H)	Match drawn
Scorecard	395 (125.3 overs); NRT Gubbins 91 (122); TK Curran 4/113 (35 overs)		242 (114.3 overs); BT Foakes 59* (235); OP Rayner 6/79 (36.3 overs)	The Oval, London; Umpires: Paul Baldwin and Nigel Llong
Scorecard			98/0 (45 overs) (f/o); RJ Burns 57* (144)	The Oval, London; Umpires: Paul Baldwin and Nigel Llong
Middlesex won the toss and elected to bat.; No play on Day 4 due to rain; Points: Middlesex 10, Surrey 9

22–25 May	(H) Hampshire	v	Nottinghamshire	Hampshire won by 69 runs
Scorecard	270 (104.2 overs); TP Alsop 72 (148); HF Gurney 4/61 (26 overs)		189 (72.5 overs); MH Wessels 72 (156); MS Crane 3/19 (10 overs)	The Rose Bowl, Southampton; Umpires: Nick Cook and Graham Lloyd
Scorecard	223/9d (75 overs); WR Smith 61 (159); HF Gurney 5/75 (24 overs)		235 (63.3 overs); BR Taylor 71 (99); TL Best 4/47 (14 overs)	The Rose Bowl, Southampton; Umpires: Nick Cook and Graham Lloyd
No toss, Nottinghamshire elected to field.; Only 57 overs possible on Day 1 due to rain; Points: Hampshire 21, Nottinghamshire 3

22–24 May	Surrey	v	Lancashire (H)	Lancashire won by an innings and 96 runs
Scorecard	191 (61.1 overs); RJ Burns 92 (164); KM Jarvis 6/70 (22 overs)		394 (117.4 overs); AN Petersen 105 (108); SC Meaker 4/78 (24.4 overs)	Old Trafford, Manchester; Umpires: Jeff Evans and Tim Robinson
Scorecard	107 (37.3 overs); TK Curran 53 (104); KM Jarvis 5/49 (15 overs)			Old Trafford, Manchester; Umpires: Jeff Evans and Tim Robinson
Surrey won the toss and elected to bat.; Play shortened on Day 1 due to rain; Points: Lancashire 21, Surrey 3

22–25 May	Somerset	v	Middlesex (H)	Match drawn
Scorecard	376 (130.2 overs); CJL Rogers 109 (211); TJ Murtagh 5/53 (30 overs)		423 (141 overs); NRT Gubbins 109 (234); MJ Leach 5/77 (30 overs)	Lord's, London; Umpires: Neil Bainton and Michael Gough
Scorecard	202/7 (62 overs); JC Hildreth 85* (146); OP Rayner 4/56 (21 overs)			Lord's, London; Umpires: Neil Bainton and Michael Gough
Somerset won the toss and elected to bat.; 16 overs lost on Day 1 due to rain and bad light; Points: Somerset 10, Middlesex 9

22–25 May	(H) Warwickshire	v	Durham	Durham won by 4 wickets
Scorecard	313 (92.4 overs); ARI Umeed 101 (204); WJ Weighell 4/97 (27 overs)		190 (71.4 overs); MD Stoneman 36 (91); CR Woakes 9/36 (20.4 overs)	Edgbaston, Birmingham; Umpires: Richard Illingworth and Alex Wharf
Scorecard	114 (37.5 overs); V Chopra 34 (70); WJ Weighell 5/33 (14.5 overs)		238/6 (79.4 overs); KK Jennings 113 (228); CJC Wright 4/72 (22 overs)	Edgbaston, Birmingham; Umpires: Richard Illingworth and Alex Wharf
No toss, Durham elected to field.; Only 77 overs possible on Day 1 due to rain; Points: Durham 19, Warwickshire 6

28–31 May	(H) Nottinghamshire	v	Durham	Match drawn
Scorecard	534 (144.4 overs); MH Wessels 159* (211); SG Borthwick 5/79 (13.4 overs)		447 (109.5 overs); SG Borthwick 188* (279); JM Bird 4/109 (27 overs)	Trent Bridge, Nottingham; Umpires: Nick Cook and Steve Garratt
Scorecard	289/3 (64 overs); BRM Taylor 105* (81); SG Borthwick 3/73 (17 overs)			Trent Bridge, Nottingham; Umpires: Nick Cook and Steve Garratt
Nottinghamshire won the toss and elected to bat.; Only 33 overs possible on Day 4 due to rain; Points: Nottinghamshire 12, Durham 12

28–30 May	Surrey	v	Somerset (H)	Somerset won by 1 wicket
Scorecard	264 (91.5 overs); SM Davies 49 (119); MJ Leach 4/34 (19 overs)		102 (29 overs); TB Abell 25 (45); GJ Batty 7/32 (9 overs)	County Ground, Taunton; Umpires: Jeff Evans and Billy Taylor
Scorecard	138 (69.1 overs); ZS Ansari 38 (129); J Overton 4/18 (11.1 overs)		301/9 (84 overs); ME Trescothick 56 (76); SC Meaker 4/79 (19 overs)	County Ground, Taunton; Umpires: Jeff Evans and Billy Taylor
Surrey won the toss and elected to bat.; Only 81 overs possible on Day 1 due to rain; Points: Somerset 19, Surrey 5

29 May – 1 June	(H) Middlesex	v	Hampshire	Middlesex won by an innings and 116 runs
Scorecard	467/3d (115.2 overs); AC Voges 160* (315); JA Tomlinson 1/77 (22.2 overs)		131 (51.4 overs); SM Ervine 31 (82); TJ Murtagh 4/33 (17 overs)	Merchant Taylors' School, Northwood; Umpires: Jeremy Lloyds and Neil Mallender
Scorecard			220 (77 overs) (f/o); JHK Adams 78 (177); JK Fuller 5/70 (18 overs)	Merchant Taylors' School, Northwood; Umpires: Jeremy Lloyds and Neil Mallender
Middlesex won the toss and elected to bat.; Only 17 overs possible on Day 3 due to rain and bad light; Points: Middlesex 24, Hampshire −1

29 May – 1 June	(H) Yorkshire	v	Lancashire	Yorkshire won by 175 runs
Scorecard	308 (97.1 overs); AU Rashid 88 (170); KM Jarvis 4/74 (20 overs)		196 (60.4 overs); LS Livingstone 60* (83); AU Rashid 3/37 (5.4 overs)	Headingley, Leeds; Umpires: Mike Burns and Peter Hartley
Scorecard	236 (84.2 overs); LE Plunkett 57 (84); N Wagner 4/71 (24 overs)		173 (86.4 overs); KR Brown 51 (153); AU Rashid 4/17 (14.4 overs)	Headingley, Leeds; Umpires: Mike Burns and Peter Hartley
No toss, Lancashire elected to field.; 16.4 overs lost on Day 3 due to bad light; Points: Yorkshire 22, Lancashire 3

==== June ====
19–22 June	(H) Surrey	v	Nottinghamshire	Surrey won by 228 runs
Scorecard	323 (102.1 overs); SM Davies 82 (160); JT Ball 4/85 (26 overs)		182 (59.4 overs); MJ Lumb 48 (112); GJ Batty 4/23 (11.4 overs)	The Oval, London; Umpires: Neil Bainton and Nick Cook
Scorecard	244/5d (62.2 overs); A Harinath 83 (167); BA Hutton 3/61 (13 overs)		157 (48.3 overs); BRM Taylor 68 (79); ZS Ansari 6/36 (11.3 overs)	The Oval, London; Umpires: Neil Bainton and Nick Cook
Surrey won the toss and elected to bat; Only 33.1 overs possible on Day 2 due to rain; Points: Surrey 22, Nottinghamshire 3

20–23 June	(H) Durham	v	Yorkshire	Match drawn
Scorecard	172 (61.1 overs); JTA Burnham 49 (134); SA Patterson 6/56 (20.1 overs)		323 (90.1 overs); GS Ballance 78 (114); C Rushworth 5/93 (25 overs)	Riverside Ground, Chester-le-Street; Umpires: Steve Garratt and Jeremy Lloyds
Scorecard	507/8d (145 overs); KK Jennings 221* (416); SA Patterson 2/77 (38 overs)		238/5 (82 overs); AZ Lees 74 (145); BJ McCarthy 2/27 (11 overs)	Riverside Ground, Chester-le-Street; Umpires: Steve Garratt and Jeremy Lloyds
No toss, Yorkshire elected to field.; Points: Yorkshire 11, Durham 8 Ben Coad (Yorkshire) made his first-class debut.

20–23 June	(H) Lancashire	v	Warwickshire	Match drawn
Scorecard	308 (103.1 overs); SJ Croft 100 (201); JS Patel 3/87 (30.1 overs)		263 (78.1 overs); TR Ambrose 70* (163); MW Parkinson 5/49 (23.1 overs)	Old Trafford, Manchester; Umpires: Jeff Evans and Graham Lloyd
Scorecard	266/8d (94 overs); LS Livingstone 106* (118); R Clarke 3/54 (16 overs)		195/2 (72 overs); IR Bell 55* (168); KM Jarvis 1/22 (10 overs)	Old Trafford, Manchester; Umpires: Jeff Evans and Graham Lloyd
No toss, Warwickshire elected to field.; Only 67 overs possible on Day 1 due to rain; Points: Lancashire 11, Warwickshire 10 Matt Parkinson (Lancashire) made his first-class debut.

26–29 June	(H) Hampshire	v	Somerset	Match drawn
Scorecard	219 (66.4 overs); JHK Adams 61 (102); J Overton 5/42 (16 overs)		474/8d (100 overs); JC Hildreth 152 (167); R McLaren 5/104 (23 overs)	The Rose Bowl, Southampton; Umpires: Stephen Gale and Peter Hartley
Scorecard	173/4 (64.4 overs); TP Alsop 53 (101); L Gregory 3/26 (13 overs)			The Rose Bowl, Southampton; Umpires: Stephen Gale and Peter Hartley
Hampshire won the toss and elected to bat; Only 54.4 overs possible on Day 3 due to rain and bad light No play on Day 4 due to rain; Points: Somerset 13, Hampshire 8

26–29 June	Lancashire	v	Middlesex (H)	Match drawn
Scorecard	513 (145.5 overs); AN Petersen 191 (285); OP Rayner 4/120 (35.5 overs)		419/5 (111 overs); NRT Gubbins 201* (329); KM Jarvis 2/101 (25 overs)	Lord's, London; Umpires: Paul Baldwin and Nick Cook
Lancashire won the toss and elected to bat; Only 67 overs possible on Day 3 due to bad light No play on Day 4 due to rain; Points: Middlesex 11, Lancashire 9

26–29 June	Nottinghamshire	v	Warwickshire (H)	Match drawn
Scorecard	152 (76 overs); JD Libby 59 (173); JS Patel 3/8 (5 overs)		311 (86.1 overs); R Clarke 74 (137); JT Ball 4/76 (23 overs)	Edgbaston, Birmingham; Umpires: Jeremy Lloyds and Billy Taylor
Scorecard	81/2 (28.3 overs); SJ Mullaney 38* (86); KHD Barker 1/14 (6 overs)			Edgbaston, Birmingham; Umpires: Jeremy Lloyds and Billy Taylor
Nottinghamshire won the toss and elected to bat; Rain reduced play on Days 1 and 3, with no play on Day 4; Points: Warwickshire 11, Nottinghamshire 8

==== July ====
2–4 July	(H) Surrey	v	Warwickshire	Warwickshire won by 10 wickets
Scorecard	273 (74 overs); AJ Finch 110 (98); JS Patel 5/62 (17 overs)		449 (118.5 overs); IJL Trott 123 (196); MHA Footitt 4/57 (19.5 overs)	Woodbridge Road, Guildford; Umpires: Ian Gould and Nigel Llong
Scorecard	177 (72.2 overs); RJ Burns 68 (139); JS Patel 5/61 (29 overs)		5/0 (0.5 overs); ARI Umeed 4* (3)	Woodbridge Road, Guildford; Umpires: Ian Gould and Nigel Llong
Surrey won the toss and elected to bat; Only 80 overs possible on Day 1 due to rain; Points: Warwickshire 23, Surrey 4

3–6 July	Hampshire	v	Durham (H)	Match drawn
Scorecard	472/9d (138.1 overs); SM Ervine 93 (153); KK Jennings 2/34 (13 overs)		421/9d (112 overs); KK Jennings 129 (261); R McLaren 3/78 (20 overs)	Riverside Ground, Chester-le-Street; Umpires: Russell Evans and Steve O'Shaughnessy
Scorecard	174/4 (67 overs); MA Carberry 59 (108); BJ McCarthy 1/20 (8 overs)			Riverside Ground, Chester-le-Street; Umpires: Russell Evans and Steve O'Shaughnessy
Durham won the toss and elected to field; Play shortened on Days 2 and 4 due to rain and bad light; Points: Durham 12, Hampshire 12

3–6 July	Lancashire	v	Nottinghamshire (H)	Match drawn
Scorecard	276 (97.5 overs); TC Smith 70 (200); Imran Tahir 4/81 (27.5 overs)		474 (128.1 overs); SR Patel 67 (121); N Wagner 3/107 (33.1 overs)	Trent Bridge, Nottingham; Umpires: Martin Saggers and Alex Wharf
Scorecard	304/7 (134 overs); H Hameed 122 (284); SCJ Broad 2/45 (25 overs)			Trent Bridge, Nottingham; Umpires: Martin Saggers and Alex Wharf
Lancashire won the toss and elected to bat; Play shortened on Day 2 due to bad light; Points: Nottinghamshire 13, Lancashire 9

3–6 July	(H) Yorkshire	v	Middlesex	Middlesex won by an innings and 4 runs
Scorecard	406 (127.5 overs); GS Ballance 132 (262); JEC Franklin 3/62 (21 overs)		577 (148.4 overs); SS Eskinazi 157 (316); JA Brooks 5/137 (37 overs)	North Marine Road Ground, Scarborough; Umpires: Jeff Evans and Peter Hartley
Scorecard	167 (69 overs); TT Bresnan 39 (78); TS Roland-Jones 3/34 (17 overs)			North Marine Road Ground, Scarborough; Umpires: Jeff Evans and Peter Hartley
Yorkshire won the toss and elected to bat; Points: Middlesex 21, Yorkshire 4

10–13 July	(H) Somerset	v	Middlesex	Middlesex won by 2 wickets
Scorecard	236 (67 overs); CJL Rogers 57 (86); HW Podmore 4/54 (21 overs)		381 (119.4 overs); JK Fuller 93 (126); J Allenby 4/67 (26 overs)	County Ground, Taunton; Umpires: Steve Garratt and David Millns
Scorecard	446/9d (134 overs); PD Trego 138 (208); HW Podmore 3/89 (34 overs)		302/8 (45.4 overs); JA Simpson 79 (80); TD Groenewald 5/90 (13 overs)	County Ground, Taunton; Umpires: Steve Garratt and David Millns
No toss, Middlesex elected to field; Points: Middlesex 23, Somerset 3

10–13 July	Hampshire	v	(H) Warwickshire	Match drawn
Scorecard	531 (140.4 overs); AJA Wheater 204* (234); JE Poysden 4/85 (15.4 overs)		398/6 (110 overs); SR Hain 135 (220); MS Crane 2/65 (18 overs)	Edgbaston, Birmingham; Umpires: Rob Bailey and Paul Baldwin
Hampshire won the toss and elected to bat; No play on Day 3 due to rain; Points: Hampshire 11, Warwickshire 10

11–14 July	(H) Surrey	v	Yorkshire	Match drawn
Scorecard	267 (82.3 overs); SM Curran 59* (98); SA Patterson 3/58 (18 overs)		407 (106.2 overs); A Lyth 202 (291); SC Meaker 3/66 (11.2 overs)	The Oval, London; Umpires: Neil Bainton and Martin Saggers
Scorecard	106/1 (38 overs); DP Sibley 54* (130); Azeem Rafiq 1/12 (11 overs)			The Oval, London; Umpires: Neil Bainton and Martin Saggers
Surrey won the toss and elected to bat; Only 33 overs possible on Day 1 and 16.4 overs on Day 2 due to rain; Points: Yorkshire 13, Surrey 10

16–19 July	(H) Lancashire	v	Durham	Durham won by 2 wickets
Scorecard	204 (70.1 overs); SJ Croft 54 (98); C Rushworth 4/30 (16.1 overs)		291 (95 overs); SG Borthwick 64 (151); JM Anderson 3/58 (22 overs)	Trafalgar Road Ground, Southport; Umpires: Rob Bailey and Richard Kettleborough
Scorecard	333 (118.4 overs); LA Procter 122 (282); BA Stokes 3/50 (19.4 overs)		247/8 (77.2 overs); KK Jennings 82 (140); TC Smith 5/25 (16 overs)	Trafalgar Road Ground, Southport; Umpires: Rob Bailey and Richard Kettleborough
Lancashire won the toss and elected to bat; Only 22.1 overs possible on Day 1 due to rain; Points: Durham 21, Lancashire 4

17–20 July	Surrey	v	(H) Hampshire	Surrey won by an innings and 13 runs
Scorecard	637/7d (163 overs); BT Foakes 141* (181); GK Berg 3/85 (30 overs)		423 (132.3 overs); LD McManus 132* (265); MHA Footitt 3/62 (22 overs)	The Rose Bowl, Southampton; Umpires: Mike Burns and Jeremy Lloyds
Scorecard			201 (77.3 overs) (f/o); R McLaren 59 (116); GJ Batty 6/51 (26 overs)	The Rose Bowl, Southampton; Umpires: Mike Burns and Jeremy Lloyds
Surrey won the toss and elected to bat; Points: Surrey 3, Hampshire 5

17–20 July	(H) Nottinghamshire	v	Somerset	Somerset won by 10 wickets
Scorecard	401 (130.3 overs); SJ Mullaney 165 (276); C Overton 4/54 (25.3 overs)		437 (127.4 overs); ME Trescothick 218 (355); Imran Tahir 7/112 (36.4 overs)	Trent Bridge, Nottingham; Umpires: Neil Bainton and Steve O'Shaughnessy
Scorecard	135 (66.2 overs); JD Libby 44 (136); J Allenby 3/23 (14 overs)		100/0 (16.5 overs); JG Myburgh 58* (55)	Trent Bridge, Nottingham; Umpires: Neil Bainton and Steve O'Shaughnessy
Nottinghamshire won the toss and elected to bat; Points: Somerset 23, Nottinghamshire 6

==== August ====
4–7 August	(H) Hampshire	v	Lancashire	Match drawn
Scorecard	548/6d (165 overs); WR Smith 210 (455); J Clark 2/63 (23 overs)		387 (156.3 overs); AN Petersen 98 (181); LA Dawson 3/63 (31 overs)	The Rose Bowl, Southampton; Umpires: Neil Mallender and Tim Robinson
Scorecard			102/3 (52 overs) (f/o); H Hameed 57* (147); LA Dawson 3/22 (18 overs)	The Rose Bowl, Southampton; Umpires: Neil Mallender and Tim Robinson
Hampshire won the toss and elected to bat; Points: Hampshire 9, Lancashire 7 Saqib Mahmood (Lancashire) made his first-class debut.

4–7 August	Surrey	v	(H) Middlesex	Match drawn
Scorecard	415 (110.2 overs); JJ Roy 110 (142); JAR Harris 3/98 (22.2 overs)		293 (91.3 overs); NRT Gubbins 82 (134); SM Curran 4/60 (14.3 overs)	Lord's, London; Umpires: Graham Lloyd and David Millns
Scorecard	266/7d (85 overs); SM Curran 71 (148); TS Roland-Jones 3/44 (16 overs)		278/6 (91 overs); GJ Bailey 110* (199); ZS Ansari 4/63 (29 overs)	Lord's, London; Umpires: Graham Lloyd and David Millns
Surrey won the toss and elected to bat; Points: Surrey 13, Middlesex 10

4–6 August	(H) Somerset	v	Durham	Somerset won by 39 runs
Scorecard	184 (41.1 overs); C Overton 42 (51); MA Wood 3/24 (7 overs)		189 (61.3 overs); AJ Hickey 36* (62); MJ Leach 5/69 (19.3 overs)	County Ground, Taunton; Umpires: Paul Baldwin and Martin Saggers
Scorecard	180 (40.5 overs); RC Davies 49 (57); G Onions 4/50 (14 overs)		136 (44.4 overs); MD Stoneman 57 (95); RE van der Merwe 4/45 (17.4 overs)	County Ground, Taunton; Umpires: Paul Baldwin and Martin Saggers
Somerset won the toss and elected to bat; Points: Somerset 19, Durham 3

4–6 August	(H) Yorkshire	v	Warwickshire	Yorkshire won by 48 runs
Scorecard	257 (98.3 overs); TM Head 54 (81); KHD Barker 4/55 (22 overs)		179 (52 overs); R Clarke 50* (71); AU Rashid 3/32 (9 overs)	Headingley Cricket Ground, Leeds; Umpires: Jeff Evans and Steve O'Shaughnessy
Scorecard	150 (65.3 overs); AZ Lees 70 (198); R Clarke 4/55 (20 overs)		180 (68.3 overs); IJL Trott 59 (107); AU Rashid 4/29 (13.3 overs)	Headingley Cricket Ground, Leeds; Umpires: Jeff Evans and Steve O'Shaughnessy
Yorkshire won the toss and elected to bat; Points: Yorkshire 21, Warwickshire 3

13–16 August	(H) Lancashire	v	Yorkshire	Match drawn
Scorecard	494 (133 overs); H Hameed 114 (209); TT Bresnan 3/80 (24 overs)		360 (134.5 overs); AZ Lees 85 (260); KM Jarvis 4/70 (25 overs)	Old Trafford Cricket Ground, Manchester; Umpires: Paul Baldwin and David Millns
Scorecard	232/3d (44 overs); H Hameed 100* (124); TT Bresnan 2/60 (11 overs)		188/0 (52 overs); AZ Lees 114* (169); LS Livingstone 0/14 (5 overs)	Old Trafford Cricket Ground, Manchester; Umpires: Paul Baldwin and David Millns
Lancashire won the toss and elected to bat; Points: Lancashire 11, Yorkshire 10

13–15 August	Durham	v	(H) Middlesex	Middlesex won by an innings and 80 runs
Scorecard	204 (59.3 overs); MD Stoneman 46 (56); OP Rayner 4/17 (8.3 overs)		536/9d (151.4 overs); NRT Gubbins 145 (302); G Onions 3/104 (31 overs)	Lord's, London; Umpires: Mike Burns and Alex Wharf
Scorecard	252 (71.5 overs); KK Jennings 45 (70); OP Rayner 5/85 (21.5 overs)			Lord's, London; Umpires: Mike Burns and Alex Wharf
Durham won the toss and elected to bat; Points: Middlesex 22, Durham 2

13–16 August	Hampshire	v	(H) Nottinghamshire	Hampshire won by 176 runs
Scorecard	319 (83 overs); AJA Wheater 102 (147); L Wood 3/53 (14 overs)		245 (75 overs); CMW Read 70* (100); A Carter 4/52 (14 overs)	Trent Bridge, Nottingham; Umpires: Russell Evans and Martin Saggers
Scorecard	393/7d (104 overs); JHK Adams 99 (185); Imran Tahir 3/111 (31 overs)		291 (84 overs); SJ Mullaney 137 (227); BTJ Wheal 6/51 (19 overs)	Trent Bridge, Nottingham; Umpires: Russell Evans and Martin Saggers
Hampshire won the toss and elected to bat; Points: Hampshire 22, Nottinghamshire 4

13–16 August	Surrey	v	(H) Warwickshire	Surrey won by 226 runs
Scorecard	252 (90.2 overs); RJ Burns 50 (153); JS Patel 4/58 (26 overs)		247 (78.5 overs); KHD Barker 62 (82); SM Curran 5/44 (19 overs)	Edgbaston Cricket Ground, Birmingham; Umpires: Nigel Cowley and Tim Robinson
Scorecard	390 (106.3 overs); KC Sangakkara 88 (126); CJC Wright 4/75 (21 overs)		169 (78 overs); IR Bell 32 (104); MHA Footitt 2/17 (10 overs)	Edgbaston Cricket Ground, Birmingham; Umpires: Nigel Cowley and Tim Robinson
Surrey won the toss and elected to bat; Points: Surrey 21, Warwickshire 4

23–26 August	(H) Durham	v	Warwickshire	Match drawn
Scorecard	207 (81.3 overs); MJ Richardson 55 (72); JS Patel 5/32 (15.3 overs)		381/8d (126 overs); IJ Westwood 127 (264); BJ McCarthy 3/56 (18 overs)	Riverside Ground, Chester-le-Street; Umpires: Neil Bainton and Peter Hartley
Scorecard	195/3 (62 overs); SJ Borthwick 92 (180); KHD Barker 1/32 (12 overs)			Riverside Ground, Chester-le-Street; Umpires: Neil Bainton and Peter Hartley
Uncontested, Warwickshire elected to bowl first; Points: Warwickshire 11, Durham 8

23–26 August	Hampshire	v	(H) Somerset	Match drawn
Scorecard	338 (119.5 overs); SM Ervine 103 (207); MJ Leach 6/108 (40.5 overs)		587/8d (137.4 overs); C Overton 138 (133); Mason Crane 3/143 (30.4 overs)	County Ground, Taunton; Umpires: Russell Evans and Jeremy Lloyds
Scorecard	254/5 (96 overs); SM Ervine 106 (154); RE van der Merwe 2/54 (27 overs)			County Ground, Taunton; Umpires: Russell Evans and Jeremy Lloyds
Hampshire won the toss and elected to bat; Points: Somerset 13, Hampshire 10

23–26 August	Lancashire	v	(H) Surrey	Surrey won by 10 wickets
Scorecard	287 (79 overs); J Clark 56 (75); SM Curran 4/61 (17 overs)		480 (143.3 overs); SM Curran 96 (127); AM Lilley 5/130 (36.3 overs)	The Oval, London; Umpires: Steve O'Shaughnessy and Martin Saggers
Scorecard	230 (72.4 overs); LA Procter 76 (153); MHA Footitt 7/62 (20.4 overs)		39/0 (9.1 overs); RJ Burns 28* (32); LS Livingstone 0/5 (1 over)	The Oval, London; Umpires: Steve O'Shaughnessy and Martin Saggers
Lancashire won the toss and elected to bat; First-class debut: Rob Jones (Lancashire); Points: Surrey 23, Lancashire 4

23–26 August	(H) Yorkshire	v	Nottinghamshire	Yorkshire won by 305 runs
Scorecard	282 (81.3 overs); AJ Hodd 96* (185); SJ Mullaney 3/54 (16 overs)		94 (37.1 overs); SJ Mullaney 25 (43); TT Bresnan 3/15 (7.1 overs)	North Marine Road Ground, Scarborough; Umpires: Mike Burns and Neil Mallender
Scorecard	263/4d (73.2 overs); GS Ballance 101* (164); SR Patel 2/33 (11 overs)		146 (57.3 overs); TJ Moores 41 (65); TT Bresnan 5/36 (12 overs)	North Marine Road Ground, Scarborough; Umpires: Mike Burns and Neil Mallender
Uncontested, Nottinghamshire elected to field first; Points: Yorkshire 21, Nottinghamshire 3

31 August – 3 September	(H) Durham	v	Nottinghamshire	Match drawn
Scorecard	244 (64.4 overs); MD Stoneman 49 (89); HF Gurney 6/61 (16.4 overs)		313 (94.2 overs); JD Libby 144 (276); C Rushworth 3/75 (22 overs)	Riverside Ground, Chester-le-Street; Umpires: Graham Lloyd and Jeremy Lloyds
Scorecard	385/8d (117 overs); KK Jennings 171* (324); LJ Fletcher 2/54 (22 overs)		17/1 (7.2 overs); SJ Mullaney 7* (29); G Onions 1/3 (3.2 overs)	Riverside Ground, Chester-le-Street; Umpires: Graham Lloyd and Jeremy Lloyds
Durham won the toss and elected to bat; Points: Nottinghamshire 11, Durham 9

31 August – 3 September	Yorkshire	v	(H) Hampshire	Match drawn
Scorecard	281 (88.2 overs); JS Lehmann 58 (73); GK Berg 6/56 (24.2 overs)		222 (64.2 overs); SM Ervine 80 (113); JA Brooks 5/53 (17.2 overs)	Rose Bowl, Southampton; Umpires: Nick Cook and Nigel Cowley
Scorecard	238/5d (64 overs); GS Ballance 72 (106); BTJ Wheal 3/79 (19 overs)		84/4 (31.4 overs); JHK Adams 30 (85); JA Brooks 3/24 (9 overs)	Rose Bowl, Southampton; Umpires: Nick Cook and Nigel Cowley
Yorkshire won the toss and elected to bat; Points: Yorkshire 10, Hampshire 9

31 August – 3 September	Somerset	v	(H) Lancashire	Match drawn
Scorecard	553/8d (138 overs); PD Trego 154* (156); TE Bailey 5/111 (34 overs)		422/9 (148 overs); AN Petersen 155 (255); L Gregory 3/74 (23 overs)	Old Trafford Cricket Ground, Manchester; Umpires: Mike Burns and Peter Hartley
Lancashire won the toss and elected to field; Points: Lancashire 10, Somerset 10

31 August – 3 September	Middlesex	v	(H) Warwickshire	Match drawn
Scorecard	242 (91.1 overs); DJ Malan 57 (110); JE Poysden 5/53 (21 overs)		172 (74.5 overs); IJ Westwood 81 (185); OP Rayner 5/49 (26.5 overs)	Edgbaston Cricket Ground, Birmingham; Umpires: David Millns and Martin Saggers
Scorecard	267/7d (86 overs); SD Robson 74 (218); JE Poysden 3/80 (18 overs)		120/4 (50.4 overs); IJ Westwood 28 (70); OP Rayner 2/42 (17.4 overs)	Edgbaston Cricket Ground, Birmingham; Umpires: David Millns and Martin Saggers
Middlesex won the toss and elected to bat; Points: Middlesex 9, Warwickshire 8

==== September ====
6–9 September	(H) Nottinghamshire	v	Middlesex	Middlesex won by 5 wickets
Scorecard	241 (86.2 overs); SR Patel 100 (137); ST Finn 4/54 (22 overs)		247 (95.1 overs); NRT Gubbins 75 (226); JT Ball 5/66 (21 overs)	Trent Bridge, Nottingham; Umpires: Mike Burns and David Millns
Scorecard	240 (77.4 overs); SJ Mullaney 64 (104); OP Rayner 4/83 (26 overs)		235/5 (74 overs); NRD Compton 63 (171); JT Ball 4/54 (20 overs)	Trent Bridge, Nottingham; Umpires: Mike Burns and David Millns
Uncontested, Middlesex elected to field first; Points: Middlesex 20, Nottinghamshire 4

6–8 September	(H) Somerset	v	Warwickshire	Somerset won by 31 runs
Scorecard	95 (30.1 overs); TB Abell 20 (36); KHD Barker 4/33 (14 overs)		123 (49.2 overs); IJ Westwood 34 (75); DM Bess 6/28 (16 overs)	County Ground, Taunton; Umpires: Steve O'Shaughnessy and Martin Saggers
Scorecard	211 (74.3 overs); CJL Rogers 58 (151); JS Patel 5/86 (34.3 overs)		152 (58 overs); R Clarke 55* (142); MJ Leach 6/42 (25 overs)	County Ground, Taunton; Umpires: Steve O'Shaughnessy and Martin Saggers
Somerset won the toss and elected to bat; First-class debut: Matthew Lamb (Warwickshire); Points: Somerset 19, Warwickshire 3

6–9 September	(H) Surrey	v	Hampshire	Match drawn
Scorecard	329 (103.5 overs); RJ Burns 101 (207); BTJ Wheal 4/100 (22 overs)		582/9d (154.5 overs); SM Ervine 158* (286); MHA Footitt 6/161 (34 overs)	The Oval, London; Umpires: Peter Hartley and Alex Wharf
Scorecard	248/3 (82.4 overs); KC Sangakkara 84* (177); SM Ervine 1/11 (2 overs)			The Oval, London; Umpires: Peter Hartley and Alex Wharf
Uncontested, Hampshire elected to field first; Points: Hampshire 12, Surrey 9

6–9 September	(H) Yorkshire	v	Durham	Yorkshire won by 228 runs
Scorecard	460 (121.1 overs); AZ Lees 132 (222); BJ McCarthy 3/103 (20 overs)		265 (94.1 overs); SG Borthwick 53 (110); JA Brooks 4/76 (19 overs)	Headingley Cricket Ground, Leeds; Umpires: Russell Evans and Graham Lloyd
Scorecard	225/2d (50.4 overs); AZ Lees 114* (143); RD Pringle 2/69 (13.4 overs)		192 (63.2 overs); RD Pringle 57* (66); RJ Sidebottom 4/34 (15 overs)	Headingley Cricket Ground, Leeds; Umpires: Russell Evans and Graham Lloyd
Uncontested, Durham elected to field first; Points: Yorkshire 23, Durham 4

12–15 September	(H) Durham	v	Surrey	Durham won by 21 runs
Scorecard	401 (98.4 overs); KK Jennings 201* (287); MHA Footitt 5/90 (24.4 overs)		367 (109.1 overs); JJ Roy 120 (165); G Onions 5/90 (31 overs)	Riverside Ground, Chester-le-Street; Umpires: Neil Mallender and David Millns
Scorecard	246 (60.3 overs); MD Stoneman 92 (144); SM Curran 7/58 (18.3 overs)		259 (74 overs); JJ Roy 96 (132); BA Stokes 4/54 (21 overs)	Riverside Ground, Chester-le-Street; Umpires: Neil Mallender and David Millns
Durham won the toss and elected to bat; Points: Durham 24, Surrey 7

12–15 September	Middlesex	v	(H) Lancashire	Match drawn
Scorecard	327 (119.4 overs); SD Robson 77 (158); SC Kerrigan 4/80 (23.4 overs)		259 (98.5 overs); RP Jones 106* (290); TS Roland-Jones 4/54 (23 overs)	Old Trafford Cricket Ground, Manchester; Umpires: Michael Gough and Alex Wharf
Scorecard	240/8d (85 overs); DJ Malan 87 (182); SC Kerrigan 6/86 (30 overs)		80/1 (26 overs); JC Buttler 26 (14); ST Finn 1/20 (7 overs)	Old Trafford Cricket Ground, Manchester; Umpires: Michael Gough and Alex Wharf
Lancashire won the toss and elected to field; Points: Middlesex 11, Lancashire 9

12–14 September	(H) Yorkshire	v	Somerset	Somerset won by 10 wickets
Scorecard	145 (61.2 overs); TT Bresnan 38* (65); J Allenby 3/16 (15 overs)		390 (98.3 overs); L Gregory 73* (111); RJ Sidebottom 5/51 (22 overs)	Headingley Cricket Ground, Leeds; Umpires: Richard Kettleborough and Jeremy Lloyds
Scorecard	286 (98.3 overs); JS Lehmann 116 (190); MJ Leach 6/64 (24.3 overs)		44/0 (10.3 overs); ME Trescothick 37* (36); RJ Sidebottom 0/10 (3 overs)	Headingley Cricket Ground, Leeds; Umpires: Richard Kettleborough and Jeremy Lloyds
Yorkshire won the toss and elected to bat; Points: Somerset 23, Yorkshire 3

20–23 September	(H) Hampshire	v	Durham	Durham won by 6 wickets
Scorecard	411 (109.1 overs); JM Vince 92 (109); G Onions 3/41 (17 overs)		361 (116 overs); MJ Richardson 99* (206); BTJ Wheal 4/39 (16 overs)	Rose Bowl, Southampton; Umpires: Mike Burns and Nick Cook
Scorecard	245/9d (63 overs); LD McManus 67 (90); RD Pringle 7/107 (28 overs)		297/4 (78 overs); MD Stoneman 137 (195); MS Crane 3/126 (27 overs)	Rose Bowl, Southampton; Umpires: Mike Burns and Nick Cook
Uncontested, Durham elected to field first; Points: Durham 22, Hampshire 7

20–23 September	(H) Middlesex	v	Yorkshire	Middlesex won by 61 runs
Scorecard	270 (108.3 overs); NRT Gubbins 125 (274); JA Brooks 6/65 (23.3 overs)		390 (116.3 overs); TT Bresnan 142* (293); TS Roland-Jones 4/73 (29 overs)	Lord's, London; Umpires: Rob Bailey and Tim Robinson; TV umpire: Neil Bainton
Scorecard	359/6d (93.5 overs); DJ Malan 116 (246); AZ Lees 2/51 (4 overs)		178 (35.2 overs); TT Bresnan 55 (48); TS Roland-Jones 6/54 (12.2 overs)	Lord's, London; Umpires: Rob Bailey and Tim Robinson; TV umpire: Neil Bainton
Uncontested, Yorkshire elected to field first; Middlesex won the 2016 County Championship; Points: Middlesex 17, Yorkshire 7

20–22 September	(H) Somerset	v	Nottinghamshire	Somerset won by 325 runs
Scorecard	365 (110.5 overs); JC Hildreth 135 (234); JT Ball 6/57 (26 overs)		138 (64.5 overs); JD Libby 42 (151); DM Bess 5/43 (22.5 overs)	County Cricket Ground, Taunton; Umpires: Neil Mallender and Alex Wharf
Scorecard	313/5d (57 overs); CJL Rogers 100* (139); SR Patel 3/95 (15 overs)		215 (63.2 overs); WT Root 66* (71); MJ Leach 4/69 (21.2 overs)	County Cricket Ground, Taunton; Umpires: Neil Mallender and Alex Wharf
Somerset won the toss and elected to bat; Points: Somerset 23, Nottinghamshire 3

20–23 September	(H) Warwickshire	v	Lancashire	Warwickshire won by 237 runs
Scorecard	219 (84.4 overs); SR Hain 52 (116); TE Bailey 4/52 (19.4 overs)		152 (64.5 overs); SJ Croft 45 (98); KHD Barker 4/30 (20.5 overs)	Edgbaston Cricket Ground, Birmingham; Umpires: Peter Hartley and David Millns
Scorecard	279/7d (83 overs); TR Ambrose 59* (114); AM Lilley 3/56 (17 overs)		109 (60.5 overs); AM Lilley 27* (27); R Clarke 4/20 (10.5 overs)	Edgbaston Cricket Ground, Birmingham; Umpires: Peter Hartley and David Millns
Uncontested, Lancashire elected to field first; Points: Warwickshire 20, Lancashire 3

=== Division Two ===
==== April ====
10–13 April	Gloucestershire	v	Essex (H)	Essex won by 10 wickets
Scorecard	262 (77.3 overs); GH Roderick 88* (172); JA Porter 4/59 (19.3 overs)		385 (120.5 overs); T Westley 121 (244); J Shaw 4/118 (34.5 overs)	County Ground, Chelmsford; Umpires: Jeff Evans and Michael Gough
Scorecard	215 (56.4 overs); JMR Taylor 74 (76); GR Napier 3/36 (11.4 overs)		94/0 (26.4 overs); NLJ Browne 55* (79)	County Ground, Chelmsford; Umpires: Jeff Evans and Michael Gough
Gloucestershire won the toss and elected to bat; Points: Essex 23, Gloucestershire 4

10–13 April	(H) Northamptonshire	v	Sussex	Match drawn
Scorecard	481/7 (135 overs); BM Duckett 282* (367); GHS Garton 3/93 (21 overs)			County Ground, Northampton; Umpires: Richard Kettleborough and Billy Taylor
No toss, Sussex elected to field; No play on Days 3 and 4 due to a wet outfield; Points: Northamptonshire 9, Sussex 6

10–13 April	(H) Worcestershire	v	Kent	Match abandoned
Scorecard				County Ground, New Road, Worcester; Umpires: Ian Gould and Richard Illingworth
No toss; No play due to a wet outfield; Points: Worcestershire 5, Kent 5

17–20 April	(H) Glamorgan	v	Leicestershire	Leicestershire won by 10 wickets
Scorecard	348 (89.3 overs); GG Wagg 64 (110); CJ McKay 6/73 (20 overs)		427 (132.2 overs); NJ O'Brien 93 (134); DL Lloyd 2/61 (14 overs)	Sophia Gardens, Cardiff; Umpires: Steve Garratt and Steve O'Shaughnessy
Scorecard	191 (53.3 overs); AHT Donald 57 (87); BA Raine 4/57 (16.3 overs)		115/0 (36.1 overs); PJ Horton 64* (105)	Sophia Gardens, Cardiff; Umpires: Steve Garratt and Steve O'Shaughnessy
Glamorgan won the toss and elected to bat; Points: Leicestershire 23, Glamorgan 5

17–20 April	Derbyshire	v	Gloucestershire (H)	Match drawn
Scorecard	444 (157.1 overs); WL Madsen 150 (329); JMR Taylor 4/61 (22.1 overs)		563 (125.2 overs); CDJ Dent 180 (312); CF Hughes 3/87 (17 overs)	County Ground, Bristol; Umpires: Nick Cook and Alex Wharf
Scorecard	260/2d (76.5 overs); CF Hughes 137* (239); JMR Taylor 1/79 (27 overs)			County Ground, Bristol; Umpires: Nick Cook and Alex Wharf
Derbyshire won the toss and elected to bat; Points: Gloucestershire 12, Derbyshire 8

17–20 April	(H) Sussex	v	Essex	Match drawn
Scorecard	360 (97 overs); CD Nash 119 (144); GR Napier 3/61 (23 overs)		320 (105.2 overs); T Westley 86 (153); SJ Magoffin 2/52 (22 overs)	County Ground, Hove; Umpires: Paul Baldwin and Tim Robinson
Scorecard	288 (70.2 overs); CD Nash 92 (115); JA Porter 5/82 (26.2 overs)		266/7 (90.4 overs); AN Cook 127* (250); A Shahzad 3/68 (20.4 overs)	County Ground, Hove; Umpires: Paul Baldwin and Tim Robinson
Sussex won the toss and elected to bat; Points: Sussex 12, Essex 11

24–27 April	Glamorgan	v	Derbyshire (H)	Match drawn
Scorecard	377 (114.4 overs); WD Bragg 129 (217); AP Palladino 5/83 (27 overs)		345 (94.5 overs); WL Madsen 97 (160); MG Hogan 4/74 (25.5 overs)	County Ground, Derby; Umpires: Neil Bainton and Nigel Llong
Scorecard	87/2 (32 overs); JA Rudolph 31* (77); WJ Durston 1/9 (9 overs)			County Ground, Derby; Umpires: Neil Bainton and Nigel Llong
Glamorgan won the toss and elected to bat; Play reduced on Days 2, 3 and 4 due to rain and snow; Points: Glamorgan 12, Derbyshire 11

24–27 April	(H) Essex	v	Northamptonshire	Essex won by an innings and 92 runs
Scorecard	441/8d (122 overs); RS Bopara 76 (185); BW Sanderson 5/108 (24 overs)		119 (32.5 overs); AM Rossington 67* (73); JA Porter 5/46 (11 overs)	County Ground, Chelmsford; Umpires: Mike Burns and David Millns
Scorecard			230 (78.2 overs) (f/o); BM Duckett 58 (64); RN ten Doeschate 4/31 (14 overs)	County Ground, Chelmsford; Umpires: Mike Burns and David Millns
No toss, Northamptonshire elected to field; Only 10 overs possible on Day 2 due to rain; Points: Essex 23, Northamptonshire 1

24–27 April	(H) Gloucestershire	v	Worcestershire	Match drawn
Scorecard	380 (114.2 overs); HJH Marshall 135 (223); JD Shantry 4/89 (31.2 overs)		411 (98.2 overs); JM Clarke 135 (175); DA Payne 3/89 (22.2 overs)	County Ground, Bristol; Umpires: Ian Blackwell and Martin Saggers
Scorecard	382/7d (101 overs); CDJ Dent 138* (272); MJ Henry 3/83 (22 overs)		210/4 (51.1 overs); MM Ali 136* (144); LC Norwell 3/69 (15 overs)	County Ground, Bristol; Umpires: Ian Blackwell and Martin Saggers
No toss, Worcestershire elected to field; Points: Worcestershire 13, Gloucestershire 12

24–27 April	Kent	v	Leicestershire (H)	Match drawn
Scorecard	264 (81.5 overs); DJ Bell-Drummond 124 (190); CJ McKay 3/66 (22 overs)		401/9d (88 overs); NJ Dexter 131 (205); MT Coles 3/95 (24 overs)	Grace Road, Leicester; Umpires: Russell Evans and Stephen Gale
Scorecard	85/2 (26 overs); SR Dickson 34* (83); CJ McKay 2/19 (6 overs)			Grace Road, Leicester; Umpires: Russell Evans and Stephen Gale
Kent won the toss and elected to bat; Play reduced on Days 1 and 2 due to rain and bad light; Points: Leicestershire 13, Kent 10

==== May ====
1–4 May	Glamorgan	v	Kent (H)	Kent won by 10 wickets
Scorecard	260 (64.5 overs); CAJ Meschede 63 (74); ME Claydon 4/59 (16 overs)		488 (111.2 overs); DJ Bell-Drummond 84 (109); MG Hogan 4/91 (29 overs)	St Lawrence Ground, Canterbury; Umpires: Rob Bailey and Nick Cook
Scorecard	414 (94.3 overs); DL Lloyd 107 (128); DI Stevens 4/79 (27 overs)		190/0 (48.4 overs); Daniel Bell-Drummond 86* (147)	St Lawrence Ground, Canterbury; Umpires: Rob Bailey and Nick Cook
Glamorgan won the toss and elected to bat; Play reduced on Day 2 due to rain; Points: Kent 24, Glamorgan 5 Harry Podmore (Glamorgan) and Hugh Bernard (Kent) both made their first-class debuts.

1–4 May	Derbyshire	v	Northamptonshire (H)	Match drawn
Scorecard	324 (89.2 overs); SJ Thakor 83* (147); Azharullah 4/95 (21.2 overs)		470 (124 overs); RE Levi 104 (129); SJ Thakor 3/65 (18 overs)	County Ground, Northampton; Umpires: Russell Evans and Martin Saggers
Scorecard	229/1d (60.4 overs); CF Hughes 109* (182); JD Libby 1/31 (7 overs)			County Ground, Northampton; Umpires: Russell Evans and Martin Saggers
Derbyshire won the toss and elected to bat; Play reduced on Day 2 due to rain; Points: Northamptonshire 13, Derbyshire 10

1–4 May	Sussex (H)	v	Leicestershire	Match drawn
Scorecard	163 (58 overs); EC Joyce 56 (135); BA Raine 4/30 (15 overs)		473/8d (137 overs); ML Pettini 142* (238); SJ Magoffin 3/58 (28 overs)	County Ground, Hove; Umpires: Ian Gould and Nigel Llong
Scorecard	377/6 (127 overs); CD Nash 144 (315); CE Shreck 2/62 (26 overs)			County Ground, Hove; Umpires: Ian Gould and Nigel Llong
Sussex won the toss and elected to bat; Only 43.2 overs possible on Day 2 due to rain and bad light; Points: Leicestershire 12, Sussex 6

1–4 May	Essex	v	Worcestershire (H)	Match drawn
Scorecard	451/9d (113.4 overs); AN Cook 142 (284); J Leach 5/115 (27.4 overs)		411/8d (110.2 overs); BL D'Oliveira 128 (220); GR Napier 4/127 (29 overs)	New Road, Worcester; Umpires: Mike Burns and Neil Mallender
Scorecard	95/2d (36 overs); AN Cook 48* (114); EG Barnard 1/16 (5 overs)			New Road, Worcester; Umpires: Mike Burns and Neil Mallender
Essex won the toss and elected to bat; 102 overs lost on Days 1 and 2 due to rain and bad light; Points: Worcestershire 12, Essex 12

8–11 May	Derbyshire (H)	v	Sussex	Match drawn
Scorecard	191 (68 overs); SJ Thakor 36* (79); LJ Hatchett 5/58 (14 overs)		468/5d (122 overs); EC Joyce 250 (327); SJ Thakor 3/59 (23 overs)	County Ground, Hove; Umpires: Mike Burns and Tim Robinson
Scorecard	92/2 (26.3 overs); CF Hughes 58* (86); SG Whittingham 1/12 (5.3 overs)			County Ground, Hove; Umpires: Mike Burns and Tim Robinson
No toss, Sussex elected to field.; No play on Day 3 and only 26.3 overs possible on Day 4 due to rain; Points: Sussex 13, Derbyshire 6

8–11 May	Worcestershire	v	Glamorgan (H)	Match drawn
Scorecard	456/6d (120.2 overs); BL D'Oliveira 202* (359); GG Wagg 3/103 (25 overs)		42/4 (20 overs); CB Cooke 27* (46); J Leach 2/15 (8 overs)	Sophia Gardens, Cardiff; Umpires: Jeremy Lloyds and Paul Pollard
Worcestershire won the toss and elected to bat.; Only 45 overs possible on Day 2, and no play on Days 3 and 4 due to rain; Points: Worcestershire 11, Glamorgan 5 Nick Selman (Glamorgan) made his first-class debut.

8–11 May	Gloucestershire	v	Kent (H)	Match drawn
Scorecard	337 (107 overs); HJH Marshall 112 (202); CJ Haggett 3/66 (26 overs)		478/8d (126 overs); SA Northeast 189 (303); DA Payne 2/76 (30 overs)	St Lawrence Ground, Canterbury; Umpires: Russell Evans and Richard Kettleborough
Scorecard	211/8 (58 overs); JMR Taylor 46* (45); CJ Haggett 3/27 (13 overs)			St Lawrence Ground, Canterbury; Umpires: Russell Evans and Richard Kettleborough
Gloucestershire won the toss and elected to bat.; Play reduced on Days 3 and 4 due to rain; Points: Kent 12, Gloucestershire 10

8–11 May	Leicestershire (H)	v	Northamptonshire	Match drawn
Scorecard	332 (103.4 overs); NJ Dexter 98 (186); OP Stone 4/56 (20.4 overs)		151 (46.3 overs); AM Rossington 35* (61); WA White 4/24 (8.3 overs)	Grace Road, Leicestershire; Umpires: Paul Baldwin and Peter Hartley
Scorecard	132/6d (39 overs); NJ O'Brien 48* (67); BW Sanderson 4/36 (8 overs)		30/1 (7 overs); AG Wakely 16* (28); CJ McKay 1/20 (4 overs)	Grace Road, Leicestershire; Umpires: Paul Baldwin and Peter Hartley
No toss, Northamptonshire elected to field.; No play on Day 3 due to rain; Points: Leicestershire 11, Northamptonshire 8

15–18 May	(H) Essex	v	Derbyshire	Match drawn
Scorecard	538/7d (148.4 overs); NLJ Browne 255 (445); SJ Thakor 4/107 (26.4 overs)		280 (87.2 overs); HD Rutherford 49 (116); RS Bopara 5/49 (18 overs)	County Ground, Chelmsford; Umpires: Ben Debenham and Ian Gould
Scorecard			261/4 (71 overs) (f/o); BA Godleman 75 (127); RS Bopara 1/24 (11 overs)	County Ground, Chelmsford; Umpires: Ben Debenham and Ian Gould
No toss, Derbyshire elected to field.; Only 24 overs possible on Day 4 due to rain; Points: Essex 11, Derbyshire 8

15–18 May	(H) Gloucestershire	v	Glamorgan	Gloucestershire won by 125 runs
Scorecard	262 (67.3 overs); GT Hankins 56 (73); T van der Gugten 3/49 (15 overs)		330 (99.4 overs); DL Lloyd 99 (120); CN Miles 3/74 (24 overs)	County Ground, Bristol; Umpires: Richard Illingworth and Graham Lloyd
Scorecard	336 (122.3 overs); CT Bancroft 70 (158); MG Hogan 4/83 (34 overs)		143 (49 overs); MA Wallace 50 (72); JMR Taylor 4/16 (6 overs)	County Ground, Bristol; Umpires: Richard Illingworth and Graham Lloyd
No toss, Glamorgan elected to field.; Play shortened on Days 3 and 4 due to rain; Points: Gloucestershire 21, Glamorgan 6

15–18 May	Kent	v	Northamptonshire (H)	Match drawn
Scorecard	396 (115.5 overs); JL Denly 206* (315); RK Kleinveldt 3/53 (17.5 overs)		498 (140.2 overs); AG Wakely 87 (161); Imran Qayyum 3/158 (41.2 overs)	County Ground, Northampton; Umpires: Ian Blackwell and Jeremy Lloyds
Scorecard	131/2 (40 overs); DJ Bell-Drummond 69* (111); RI Keogh 1/24 (8 overs)			County Ground, Northampton; Umpires: Ian Blackwell and Jeremy Lloyds
Kent won the toss and elected to bat.; Only 11 overs possible on Day 4 due to rain; Points: Northamptonshire 11, Kent 11 Imran Qayyum (Kent) made his first-class debut.

15–18 May	(H) Worcestershire	v	Sussex	Match drawn
Scorecard	491 (121.2 overs); BL D'Oliveira 99 (154); SG Whittingham 3/86 (19 overs)		278 (97.2 overs); BC Brown 55 (106); EG Barnard 3/67 (20 overs)	New Road, Worcester; Umpires: Steve Garratt and Michael Gough
Scorecard			411/9 (144 overs) (f/o); EC Joyce 74 (179); MJ Henry 4/122 (31 overs)	New Road, Worcester; Umpires: Steve Garratt and Michael Gough
Worcestershire won the toss and elected to bat.; Rain delayed play on Day 4; Points: Worcestershire 13, Sussex 9

22–25 May	(H) Derbyshire	v	Kent	Kent won by 7 wickets
Scorecard	492 (125.5 overs); SJ Thakor 130 (164); MT Coles 5/116 (34.5 overs)		412 (126 overs); SR Dickson 207* (362); SJ Thakor 5/63 (19 overs)	County Ground, Derby; Umpires: Neil Mallender and David Millns
Scorecard	94 (28.4 overs); WL Madsen 37 (54); CJ Haggett 4/15 (6.4 overs)		176/3 (32.3 overs); DJ Bell-Drummond 80* (99); CF Hughes 1/11 (1 over)	County Ground, Derby; Umpires: Neil Mallender and David Millns
Derbyshire won the toss and elected to bat.; Play shortened on Day 2 due to rain; Points: Kent 21, Derbyshire 7

22–25 May	(H) Glamorgan	v	Essex	Match drawn
Scorecard	260 (75.4 overs); CB Cooke 63 (106); GR Napier 5/82 (20.4 overs)		313 (115 overs); RS Bopara 80 (174); T van der Gugten 5/90 (32 overs)	Sophia Gardens, Cardiff; Umpires: Rob Bailey and Verdayne Smith (West Indies)
Scorecard	386/8d (114.5 overs); WD Bragg 161* (312); DD Masters 3/95 (36 overs)		160/5 (63 overs); NLJ Browne 71 (161); MG Hogan 2/10 (10 overs)	Sophia Gardens, Cardiff; Umpires: Rob Bailey and Verdayne Smith (West Indies)
No toss, Essex elected to field.; Points: Glamorgan 10, Essex 10

22–25 May	Northamptonshire	v	Gloucestershire (H)	Match drawn
Scorecard	176 (52.4 overs); SP Crook 60 (77); CN Miles 5/65 (15.4 overs)		418 (134.4 overs); M Klinger 140 (286); S Prasanna 5/97 (27.4 overs)	County Ground, Bristol; Umpires: Mike Burns and Martin Saggers
Scorecard	399/8d (119 overs); RI Newton 108 (235); DA Payne 3/72 (21 overs)			County Ground, Bristol; Umpires: Mike Burns and Martin Saggers
Northamptonshire won the toss and elected to bat.; Only 40 overs possible on Day 1 due to rain; Points: Gloucestershire 11, Northamptonshire 7

22–24 May	(H) Leicestershire	v	Worcestershire	Worcestershire won by 7 wickets
Scorecard	316 (106.1 overs); PJ Horton 89 (131); J Leach 5/99 (28.1 overs)		274 (75.3 overs); MJ Henry 49* (53); BA Raine 3/69 (21 overs)	Grace Road, Leicester; Umpires: Nigel Cowley and Billy Taylor
Scorecard	43 (25 overs); NJ O'Brien 17 (44); J Leach 4/10 (12 overs)		88/3 (15.5 overs); AN Kervezee 29* (17); CJ McKay 3/28 (7 overs)	Grace Road, Leicester; Umpires: Nigel Cowley and Billy Taylor
No toss, Worcestershire elected to field.; 13 overs lost on Day 1 due to rain and bad light; Points: Worcestershire 21, Leicestershire 6

28–31 May	(H) Northamptonshire	v	Essex	Match drawn
Scorecard	444 (114.5 overs); BM Duckett 189 (255); RS Bopara 5/95 (27 overs)		640/9d (149.2 overs); RN ten Doeschate 145 (149); RJ Gleeson 4/105 (30 overs)	County Ground, Northampton; Umpires: Neil Bainton and Graham Lloyd
Scorecard	75/5 (25 overs); BM Duckett 33 (32); RS Bopara 2/25 (8 overs)			County Ground, Northampton; Umpires: Neil Bainton and Graham Lloyd
No toss, Essex elected to field.; Only 6 overs possible on Day 4 due to rain; Points: Essex 12, Northamptonshire 11

28–31 May	Derbyshire	v	Sussex (H)	Sussex won by 10 wickets
Scorecard	150 (43.3 overs); SJ Thakor 47* (50); SJ Magoffin 4/23 (12.3 overs)		447/8d (109.5 overs); EC Joyce 106 (171); WL Madsen 2/65 (21 overs)	County Ground, Hove; Umpires: Martin Saggers and Verdayne Smith (West Indies)
Scorecard	307 (94.1 overs); SJ Thakor 81 (102); OE Robinson 4/110 (30 overs)		11/0 (0.3 overs); EC Joyce 5* (3)	County Ground, Hove; Umpires: Martin Saggers and Verdayne Smith (West Indies)
Sussex won the toss and elected to field.; Only 40 overs possible on Day 1 due to rain; Points: Sussex 24, Derbyshire 2 In their second innings, Sussex scored more runs from extras (6) than their highest-scoring batsman (Ed Joyce with 5)

29 May – 1 June	Leicestershire	v	Kent (H)	Match drawn
Scorecard	341 (98.3 overs); MJ Cosgrove 119 (170); DI Stevens 4/74 (24 overs)		117/2 (44 overs); DJ Bell-Drummond 65* (125); BA Raine 1/20 (11 overs)	St Lawrence Ground, Canterbury; Umpires: Paul Pollard and Alex Wharf
Leicestershire won the toss and elected to bat.; Only 46.3 overs possible on Day 2 due to rain and bad light No play on Days 3 and 4 due to rain; Points: Kent 8, Leicestershire 8

29 May – 1 June	(H) Worcestershire	v	Gloucestershire	Gloucestershire won by 5 wickets
Scorecard	439 (113.1 overs); T Kohler-Cadmore 169 (281); LC Norwell 4/70 (29.1 overs)		364/6d (112 overs); GL van Buuren 172* (307); JD Shantry 2/56 (27 overs)	New Road, Worcester; Umpires: Stephen Gale and Steve O'Shaughnessy
Scorecard	239 (56.3 overs); RA Whiteley 71 (88); CN Miles 5/54 (12.3 overs)		320/5 (57.4 overs); JMR Taylor 107* (72); J Leach 2/70 (14 overs)	New Road, Worcester; Umpires: Stephen Gale and Steve O'Shaughnessy
No toss, Gloucestershire elected to field.; Play shortened on Days 3 and 4 due to rain and bad light; Points: Gloucestershire 23, Worcestershire 7

==== June ====
19–22 June	(H) Essex	v	Leicestershire	Leicestershire won by 4 wickets
Scorecard	268 (86.3 overs); RS Bopara 61 (168); CJ McKay 4/47 (16.3 overs)		243 (78 overs); AJ Robson 74 (135); DD Masters 3/33 (19 overs)	County Ground, Chelmsford; Umpires: Russell Evans and Peter Hartley
Scorecard	133 (61.3 overs); T Westley 25 (40); CJ McKay 4/37 (20 overs)		159/6 (31.1 overs); AJ Robson 56 (75); RS Bopara 3/43 (8 overs)	County Ground, Chelmsford; Umpires: Russell Evans and Peter Hartley
No toss, Leicestershire elected to field.; 12.2 overs lost on Day 1 due to bad light No play on Day 2 due to rain; Points: Leicestershire 20, Essex 5

19–22 June	(H) Glamorgan	v	Kent	Match drawn
Scorecard	351 (80 overs); GG Wagg 83 (120); ME Claydon 5/106 (23 overs)		282 (88.3 overs); SR Dickson 75 (138); T van der Gugten 5/79 (26.3 overs)	Sophia Gardens, Cardiff; Umpires: Stephen Gale and Tim Robinson
Scorecard	279/6d (73 overs); AHT Donald 67 (68); ME Claydon 3/50 (15 overs)			Sophia Gardens, Cardiff; Umpires: Stephen Gale and Tim Robinson
No toss, Kent elected to field.; 104 overs lost on Days 1 and 2 due to rain; Points: Glamorgan 12, Kent 10

20–23 June	(H) Derbyshire	v	Worcestershire	Match drawn
Scorecard	467/5d (127 overs); BA Godleman 204 (328); J Leach 2/90 (25 overs)		164 (53.1 overs); OB Cox 40 (47); BD Cotton 4/28 (14 overs)	County Ground, Derby; Umpires: Paul Baldwin and Nigel Cowley
Scorecard			294/6 (104.3 overs) (f/o); EG Barnard 73 (167); BD Cotton 2/34 (18 overs)	County Ground, Derby; Umpires: Paul Baldwin and Nigel Cowley
No toss, Worcestershire elected to field.; No play on Day 1 due to rain; Points: Derbyshire 12, Worcestershire 6 Rob Hemmings (Derbyshire) made his first-class debut.

22–25 June	(H) Sussex	v	Northamptonshire	Match drawn
Scorecard	178 (51.1 overs); CD Nash 75 (119); Azharullah 6/68 (16 overs)		478/5d (116 overs); AM Rossington 138* (121); A Shahzad 2/91 (24 overs)	Arundel Castle Cricket Ground, Arundel; Umpires: Ben Debenham and Steve O'Shaughnessy
Scorecard	145/2 (57.5 overs); EC Joyce 60 (133); RI Keogh 1/19 (10 overs)			Arundel Castle Cricket Ground, Arundel; Umpires: Ben Debenham and Steve O'Shaughnessy
No toss, Northamptonshire elected to field.; Play shortened on Days 1, 2 and 4 due to rain; Points: Northamptonshire 13, Sussex 6

26–29 June	(H) Kent	v	Derbyshire	Match drawn
Scorecard	379 (105.2 overs); SA Northeast 191 (266); AP Palladino 4/76 (29 overs)		574/9d (162.4 overs); WL Madsen 163 (293); JC Tredwell 3/153 (48.4 overs)	St Lawrence Ground, Canterbury; Umpires: Neil Bainton and Steve O'Shaughnessy
Scorecard	238/3 (74 overs); TWM Latham 74 (164); NT Broom 1/17 (6 overs)			St Lawrence Ground, Canterbury; Umpires: Neil Bainton and Steve O'Shaughnessy
No toss, Derbyshire elected to field.; Only 62.3 overs possible on Day 4 due to rain; Points: Derbyshire 12, Kent 10

27–30 June	(H) Leicestershire	v	Gloucestershire	Match drawn
Scorecard	334 (114.1 overs); NJ Dexter 136 (315); LC Norwell 4/72 (32.1 overs)		403/2 (89.1 overs); CDJ Dent 165 (229); NJ Dexter 1/62 (16 overs)	Grace Road, Leicester; Umpires: Nigel Cowley and Steve Garratt
No toss, Gloucestershire elected to field.; Rain reduced play on Days 2 and 4, with no play on Day 3; Points: Gloucestershire 12, Leicestershire 8

==== July ====
2–5 July	Glamorgan	v	Sussex (H)	Match drawn
Scorecard	335 (112.1 overs); JA Rudolph 87 (197); SG Whittingham 4/58 (26.1 overs)		552/5d (158 overs); LWP Wells 181 (343); GG Wagg 2/98 (31 overs)	County Ground, Hove; Umpires: Paul Baldwin and Richard Kettleborough
Scorecard	307/6 (97.3 overs); DL Lloyd 102* (168); DR Briggs 2/62 (26 overs)			County Ground, Hove; Umpires: Paul Baldwin and Richard Kettleborough
Glamorgan won the toss and elected to bat; Points: Sussex 11, Glamorgan 9

3–6 July	Kent	v	Essex (H)	Essex won by 10 wickets
Scorecard	207 (62.3 overs); AJ Blake 89* (116); JA Porter 3/51 (18 overs)		569 (145.3 overs); RS Bopara 94 (157); K Rabada 4/118 (34 overs)	County Ground, Chelmsford; Umpires: Steve Garratt and David Millns
Scorecard	370 (122 overs); SA Northeast 166* (320); MR Quinn 4/60 (24 overs)		9/0 (1.4 overs); NLJ Browne 8* (6)	County Ground, Chelmsford; Umpires: Steve Garratt and David Millns
Essex won the toss and elected to field; Points: Essex 24, Kent 2

3–6 July	Leicestershire	v	Worcestershire (H)	Worcestershire won by 3 wickets
Scorecard	407 (125 overs); NJ Dexter 109 (204); EG Barnard 4/62 (20 overs)		349 (103.1 overs); J Leach 90 (104); CJ McKay 4/59 (24.1 overs)	County Ground, New Road, Worcester; Umpires: Graham Lloyd and Jeremy Lloyds
Scorecard	307/3d (76 overs); MJ Cosgrove 146 (183); J Leach 2/54 (14 overs)		369/7 (73.2 overs); JM Clarke 123 (172); CE Shreck 4/104 (22 overs)	County Ground, New Road, Worcester; Umpires: Graham Lloyd and Jeremy Lloyds
Leicestershire won the toss and elected to bat; Points: Worcestershire 21, Leicestershire 5

4–7 July	(H) Derbyshire	v	Northamptonshire	Match abandoned
Scorecard				Queen's Park, Chesterfield; Umpires: Ian Blackwell and Neil Mallender
No toss; No play due to a wet outfield; Points: Derbyshire 5, Northamptonshire 5

10–12 July	Worcestershire	v	(H) Northamptonshire	Worcestershire won by 311 runs
Scorecard	277 (76.4 overs); OB Cox 74 (109); Azharullah 4/68 (15 overs)		148 (45.1 overs); AM Rossington 55 (78); J Leach 5/70 (18.1 overs)	County Ground, Northampton; Umpires: Alex Wharf and Virender Sharma
Scorecard	324–8d (83 overs); BL D'Oliveira 81 (163); S Prasanna 2/14 (8 overs)		142 (35.3 overs); SP Crook 33 (34); MJ Henry 5/36 (14 overs	County Ground, Northampton; Umpires: Alex Wharf and Virender Sharma
Worcestershire won the toss and elected to bat; First-class debut: George Rhodes (Worcestershire); Points: Worcestershire 21, Northamptonshire 3

13–16 July	(H) Gloucestershire	v	Essex	Gloucestershire won by 61 runs
Scorecard	255 (77.2 overs); GH Roderick 61 (116); MR Quinn 7/76 (26 overs)		333 (82.1 overs); DW Lawrence 127 (177); J Shaw 4/72 (17 overs)	College Ground, Cheltenham; Umpires: Richard Illingworth and Billy Taylor
Scorecard	290 (83.4 overs); GH Roderick 102 (140); GR Napier 4/62 (22.4 overs)		151 (43.3 overs); Ashar Zaidi 37 (49); LC Norwell 4/65 (16.3 overs)	College Ground, Cheltenham; Umpires: Richard Illingworth and Billy Taylor
Uncontested, Essex elected to field first; Points: Gloucestershire 21, Essex 6

17–20 July	(H) Glamorgan	v	Derbyshire	Glamorgan won by 4 wickets
Scorecard	518 (104.5 overs); AHT Donald 234 (136); WS Davis 7/146 (25.5 overs)		177 (52 overs); HR Hosein 27* (79); CAJ Meschede 3/33 (12 overs)	Penrhyn Avenue, Colwyn Bay; Umpires: Nigel Cowley and Stephen Gale
Scorecard	200/6 (45.4 overs); JA Rudolph 51* (78); WL Madsen 2/24 (4.4 overs)		536 (162.1 overs) (f/o); CF Hughes 122 (219); GG Wagg 3/93 (29 overs)	Penrhyn Avenue, Colwyn Bay; Umpires: Nigel Cowley and Stephen Gale
Glamorgan won the toss and elected to bat first; Points: Glamorgan 24, Derbyshire 3

17–20 July	(H) Kent	v	Sussex	Match drawn
Scorecard	575 (158.3 overs); SA Northeast 190 (244); DR Briggs 5/169 (49.3 overs)		333 (127.1 overs); LRPL Taylor 142* (250); K Rabada 3/81 (28 overs)	Nevill Ground, Royal Tunbridge Wells; Umpires: Nick Cook and Virender Sharma
Scorecard			255/5 (91 overs) (f/o); LRPL Taylor 68 (89); JC Tredwell 3/76 (30 overs)	Nevill Ground, Royal Tunbridge Wells; Umpires: Nick Cook and Virender Sharma
Kent won the toss and elected to bat; Points: Kent 11, Sussex 8

20–22 July	(H) Gloucestershire	v	Leicestershire	Leicestershire won by 6 wickets
Scorecard	183 (49.5 overs); JMR Taylor 51 (64); BA Raine 4/57 (14 overs)		218 (70.4 overs); AJ Robson 62 (170); DA Payne 5/36 (19.4 overs)	College Ground, Cheltenham; Umpires: Michael Gough and Graham Lloyd
Scorecard	215 (66.1 overs); M Klinger 54 (108); CJ McKay 3/43 (17 overs)		181/4 (54.3 overs); PJ Horton 73 (139); GL van Buuren 2/24 (8 overs)	College Ground, Cheltenham; Umpires: Michael Gough and Graham Lloyd
Uncontested, Leicestershire elected to field first; Points: Leicestershire 20, Gloucestershire 3

==== August ====
3–6 August	Northamptonshire	v	(H) Glamorgan	Northamptonshire won by 251 runs
Scorecard	321 (86.4 overs); RK Kleinveldt 91 (88); DL Lloyd 3/36 (10 overs)		236 (80 overs); NJ Selman 122* (208); Azharullah 3/58 (18 overs)	St. Helen's Ground, Swansea; Umpires: Steve Garratt and Richard Illingworth
Scorecard	261/9d (58.1 overs); LJ Evans 73 (123); T van der Gugten 5/61 (13.1 overs)		95 (38 overs); MA Wallace 28* (40); BW Sanderson 7/22 (13 overs)	St. Helen's Ground, Swansea; Umpires: Steve Garratt and Richard Illingworth
Northamptonshire won the toss and elected to bat; First-class debut: Lukas Carey (Glamorgan); Points: Northamptonshire 22, Glamorgan 4

3–6 August	Worcestershire	v	(H) Kent	Kent won by 10 wickets
Scorecard	211 (73.1 overs); JM Clarke 69 (124); ME Claydon 5/42 (17 overs)		451 (129.3 overs); DI Stevens 81 (105); EG Barnard 3/97 (27 overs)	St Lawrence Ground, Canterbury; Umpires: Billy Taylor and Alex Wharf
Scorecard	251 (93.3 overs); GH Rhodes 55 (114); DI Stevens 3/31 (12.3 overs)		14/0 (1.5 overs); SR Dickson 4* (7); CAJ Morris 0/5 (1 over)	St Lawrence Ground, Canterbury; Umpires: Billy Taylor and Alex Wharf
Kent won the toss and elected to field; Points: Kent 23, Worcestershire 4

4–7 August	(H) Essex	v	Sussex	Match drawn
Scorecard	358 (108.5 overs); RN ten Doeschate 83 (124); CJ Jordan 4/99 (30.5 overs)		448 (122.2 overs); CJ Jordan 131 (190); GR Napier 5/114 (29.2 overs)	Castle Park Cricket Ground, Colchester; Umpires: Nigel Cowley and Russell Evans
Scorecard	470/8 (126 overs); GR Napier 124 (155); CJ Jordan 3/88 (24 overs)			Castle Park Cricket Ground, Colchester; Umpires: Nigel Cowley and Russell Evans
Essex won the toss and elected to bat; Points: Sussex 12, Essex 11

4–7 August	(H) Leicestershire	v	Derbyshire	Match drawn
Scorecard	380 (125.4 overs); EJH Eckersley 117 (249); CF Parkinson 4/90 (33.4 overs)		362 (109.1 overs); WL Madsen 76 (138); BA Raine 5/66 (24.1 overs)	Grace Road, Leicester; Umpires: Rob Bailey and Mike Burns
Scorecard	294/9d (107 overs); EJH Eckersley 104 (178); CF Parkinson 3/88 (37 overs)		104/4 (30 overs); WL Madsen 42* (73); CE Shreck 2/14 (7 overs)	Grace Road, Leicester; Umpires: Rob Bailey and Mike Burns
Leicestershire won the toss and elected to bat; First-class debuts: Alex Mellor and Callum Parkinson (both Derbyshire); Points: Leicestershire 11, Derbyshire 11

13–16 August	Essex	v	(H) Derbyshire	Essex won by an innings and 62 runs
Scorecard	530/9d (144.5 overs); NLJ Browne 229* (417); TP Milnes 6/93 (32 overs)		165 (65.3 overs); AJ Mellor 44 (81); GR Napier 4/28 (15 overs)	County Cricket Ground, Derby; Umpires: Stephen Gale and Jeremy Lloyds
Scorecard			303 (95.2 overs) (f/o); BA Godleman 100 (154); GR Napier 4/50 (18.2 overs)	County Cricket Ground, Derby; Umpires: Stephen Gale and Jeremy Lloyds
Essex won the toss and elected to bat; First-class debuts: Paul Walter (Essex); Points: Essex 23, Derbyshire 1

13–16 August	Leicestershire	v	(H) Northamptonshire	Match drawn
Scorecard	519 (144.2 overs); ML Pettini 117 (237); BW Sanderson 6/58 (30 overs)		397/7d (124 overs); RI Newton 202* (347); NJ Dexter 2/35 (19 overs)	County Cricket Ground, Northampton; Umpires: Neil Bainton and Jeff Evans
Scorecard	292/6d (58 overs); PJ Horton 99 (150); SA Zaib 5/148 (26 overs)		118/1 (38 overs); AG Wakely 53* (112); BA Raine 1/25 (9 overs)	County Cricket Ground, Northampton; Umpires: Neil Bainton and Jeff Evans
Leicestershire won the toss and elected to bat; Points: Leicestershire 11, Northamptonshire 10

13–16 August	Gloucestershire	v	(H) Sussex	Sussex won by an innings and 2 runs
Scorecard	367 (107 overs); M Klinger 129* (272); SJ Magoffin 5/73 (28 overs)		527 (132.1 overs); LWP Wells 120 (257); MD Taylor 4/130 (33 overs)	County Cricket Ground, Hove; Umpires: Graham Lloyd and Billy Taylor
Scorecard	158 (54.5 overs); JMR Taylor 56 (86); CJ Jordan 4/36 (16 overs)			County Cricket Ground, Hove; Umpires: Graham Lloyd and Billy Taylor
Gloucestershire won the toss and elected to bat; Points: Sussex 24, Gloucestershire 6

13–16 August	(H) Worcestershire	v	Glamorgan	Glamorgan won by 5 wickets
Scorecard	163 (57.4 overs); RA Whiteley 40 (91); MG Hogan 4/44 (15 overs)		280 (77.2 overs); WD Bragg 98 (133); J Leach 5/106 (22 overs)	New Road, Worcester; Umpires: Steve Garratt and Peter Hartley
Scorecard	393 (138.1 overs); JM Clarke 98 (209); GG Wagg 5/90 (33 overs)		278/5 (87.1 overs); AO Morgan 103* (242); J Leach 3/66 (21 overs)	New Road, Worcester; Umpires: Steve Garratt and Peter Hartley
Uncontested, Worcestershire elected to field first; Points: Glamorgan 21, Worcestershire 3

23–26 August	(H) Glamorgan	v	Sussex	Sussex won by 2 wickets
Scorecard	252 (60.1 overs); MA Wallace 61 (59); JC Archer 4/91 (21 overs)		283 (109.2 overs); CD Nash 132 (284); T van der Gugten 3/61 (26.2 overs)	Sophia Gardens, Cardiff; Umpires: Nigel Cowley and Jeff Evans
Scorecard	263 (77.1 overs); AHT Donald 59 (64); SJ Magoffin 3/50 (23 overs)		236/8 (58.4 overs); CD Nash 64 (108); T van der Gugten 5/73 (19 overs)	Sophia Gardens, Cardiff; Umpires: Nigel Cowley and Jeff Evans
Uncontested, Sussex elected to field first; Points: Sussex 21, Glamorgan 5

23–26 August	(H) Gloucestershire	v	Kent	Kent won by an innings and 69 runs
Scorecard	221 (94.2 overs); HJH Marshall 58 (192); GC Viljoen 5/55 (22.2 overs)		533/6d (119.4 overs); SW Billings 171 (202); LC Norwell 2/88 (27 overs)	County Cricket Ground, Bristol; Umpires: Paul Baldwin and Alex Wharf
Scorecard	243 (86.3 overs); HJH Marshall 118 (213); DI Stevens 3/47 (19 overs)			County Cricket Ground, Bristol; Umpires: Paul Baldwin and Alex Wharf
Uncontested, Kent elected to field first; Points: Kent 24, Gloucestershire 2

23–25 August	(H) Leicestershire	v	Essex	Essex won by an innings and 10 runs
Scorecard	238 (84.1 overs); MJ Cosgrove 71 (150); JA Porter 4/50 (14.1 overs)		423 (117.2 overs); DW Lawrence 154 (304); D Klein 4/107 (26 overs)	Grace Road, Leicester; Umpires: Nick Cook and Billy Taylor
Scorecard	175 (49.3 overs); NJ Dexter 44 (85); DD Masters 4/39 (15.3 overs)			Grace Road, Leicester; Umpires: Nick Cook and Billy Taylor
Uncontested, Essex elected to field first; Points: Essex 24, Leicestershire 3

23–26 August	Northamptonshire	v	(H) Worcestershire	Worcestershire won by 2 wickets
Scorecard	551 (144.1 overs); RI Keogh 154 (236); EG Barnard 3/117 (30 overs)		201/3d (59.1 overs); DKH Mitchell 107* (188); BW Sanderson 2/54 (20 overs)	New Road, Worcester; Umpires: Stephen Gale and Graham Lloyd
Scorecard	50/1d (9.2 overs); RI Newton 27* (28); JD Shantry 1/6 (3 overs)		404/8 (79 overs); JM Clarke 125 (156); BW Sanderson 4/74 (17 overs)	New Road, Worcester; Umpires: Stephen Gale and Graham Lloyd
Worcestershire won the toss and elected to field; Points: Worcestershire 19, Northamptonshire 5

31 August – 3 September	(H) Derbyshire	v	Gloucestershire	Match drawn
Scorecard	242 (81.5 overs); BT Slater 110 (213); CN Miles 4/30 (17 overs)		331 (98.5 overs); P Mustard 107* (193); AP Palladino 5/74 (25.5 overs)	County Cricket Ground, Derby; Umpires: Jeff Evans and Russell Evans
Scorecard	360 (95.2 overs); AL Hughes 140 (209); CN Miles 4/82 (16.2 overs)		10/0 (5 overs); GH Roderick 6* (18); TP Milnes 0/4 (2 overs)	County Cricket Ground, Derby; Umpires: Jeff Evans and Russell Evans
Derbyshire won the toss and elected to bat; Points: Gloucestershire 11, Derbyshire 9

31 August – 2 September	Worcestershire	v	(H) Essex	Essex won by an innings and 161 runs
Scorecard	230 (68.2 overs); OB Cox 63 (72); DD Masters 7/52 (21.2 overs)		601/5d (138 overs); T Westley 254 (383); J Leach 2/107 (29 overs)	County Cricket Ground, Chelmsford; Umpires: Neil Bainton and Neil Mallender
Scorecard	210 (57.4 overs); GH Rhodes 41 (65); GR Napier 5/59 (16.1 overs)			County Cricket Ground, Chelmsford; Umpires: Neil Bainton and Neil Mallender
Worcestershire won the toss and elected to bat; Points: Essex 24, Worcestershire 2

31 August – 2 September	(H) Northamptonshire	v	Glamorgan	Northamptonshire won by 318 runs
Scorecard	269 (82.3 overs); BM Duckett 80 (100); KS Carlson 5/28 (14 overs)		124 (42.5 overs); JA Rudolph 37 (86); RI Keogh 9/52 (18.5 overs)	County Cricket Ground, Northampton; Umpires: Paul Baldwin and Alex Wharf
Scorecard	305/7d (58.4 overs); BM Duckett 185 (159); GG Wagg 3/72 (16 overs)		132 (62.5 overs); NJ Selman 30* (131); GG White 6/44 (28 overs)	County Cricket Ground, Northampton; Umpires: Paul Baldwin and Alex Wharf
Northamptonshire won the toss and elected to bat; First-class debut: Kiran Carlson (Glamorgan); Points: Northamptonshire 21, Glamorgan 3

31 August – 2 September	(H) Sussex	v	Kent	Kent won by an innings and 127 runs
Scorecard	180 (40.5 overs); BC Brown 54 (47); GC Viljoen 3/70 (12 overs)		496 (132.5 overs); WRS Gidman 99* (240); SJ Magoffin 5/88 (34.5 overs)	County Cricket Ground, Hove; Umpires: Steve Garratt and Steve O'Shaughnessy
Scorecard	189 (41.5 overs); C Cachopa 34 (42); GC Viljoen 3/34 (9 overs)			County Cricket Ground, Hove; Umpires: Steve Garratt and Steve O'Shaughnessy
Uncontested, Kent elected to field first; First-class debut: Tom Haines (Sussex); Points: Kent 24, Sussex 2

==== September ====
6–8 September	(H) Glamorgan	v	Gloucestershire	Gloucestershire won by 10 wickets
Scorecard	220 (64.5 overs); NJ Selman 101 (144); CN Miles 4/44 (14.5 overs)		363 (130.1 overs); HJH Marshall 101 (189); MG Hogan 5/36 (25.1 overs)	Sophia Gardens, Cardiff; Umpires: Jeff Evans and Steve Garratt
Scorecard	232 (58.4 overs); WD Bragg 52 (91); DA Payne 4/45 (14 overs)		92/0 (19.4 overs); GH Roderick 56* (61); T van der Gugten 0/6 (3 overs)	Sophia Gardens, Cardiff; Umpires: Jeff Evans and Steve Garratt
Uncontested, Gloucestershire elected to field first; Points: Gloucestershire 22, Glamorgan 3

6–8 September	(H) Kent	v	Northamptonshire	Northamptonshire won by 10 wickets
Scorecard	230 (82.2 overs); SR Dickson 63 (159); RK Kleinveldt 3/70 (20.2 overs)		384 (97.4 overs); BM Duckett 208 (251); ME Claydon 3/73 (16 overs)	County Cricket Ground, Beckenham; Umpires: Neil Bainton and Jeremy Lloyds
Scorecard	184 (56.4 overs); GC Viljoen 63 (106); RK Kleinveldt 5/53 (21 overs)		31/0 (4.3 overs); RI Newton 15* (14); JC Tredwell 0/12 (2 overs)	County Cricket Ground, Beckenham; Umpires: Neil Bainton and Jeremy Lloyds
Uncontested, Northamptonshire elected to field first; Replacement: Sam Billings for Callum Jackson (Kent, 2nd innings, 6.3 overs); Points: Northamptonshire 23, Kent 4

6–7 September	(H) Leicestershire	v	Sussex	Sussex won by an innings and 59 runs
Scorecard	135 (51 overs); NJ Dexter 52 (112); SJ Magoffin 5/50 (18 overs)		313 (72.1 overs); OE Robinson 81 (96); NJ Dexter 5/52 (14 overs)	Grace Road, Leicester; Umpires: Nigel Cowley and Stephen Gale
Scorecard	119 (47.1 overs); EJH Eckersley 31 (88); D Wiese 3/20 (9 overs)			Grace Road, Leicester; Umpires: Nigel Cowley and Stephen Gale
Uncontested, Sussex elected to field first; Points: Sussex 22, Leicestershire 3

12–15 September	(H) Derbyshire	v	Leicestershire	Match drawn
Scorecard	307 (91.2 overs); HR Hosein 83* (132); CE Shreck 4/78 (22.2 overs)		247 (90.1 overs); MJ Cosgrove 95* (156); WS Davis 4/68 (23 overs)	County Cricket Ground, Derby; Umpires: Jeff Evans and Graham Lloyd
Scorecard	286/8d (80 overs); WL Madsen 134* (226); CJ McKay 2/61 (17 overs)		301/8 (96 overs); MJ Cosgrove 110 (189); AP Palladino 4/64 (25 overs)	County Cricket Ground, Derby; Umpires: Jeff Evans and Graham Lloyd
Uncontested, Leicestershire elected to field first; First-class debuts: Thomas Wood (Derbyshire) and Harry Dearden (Leicestershire); Points: Derbyshire 11, Leicestershire 9

12–15 September	Glamorgan	v	(H) Essex	Glamorgan won by 11 runs
Scorecard	286 (96.3 overs); KS Carlson 119 (229); GR Napier 4/46 (15 overs)		319 (92.5 overs); RN ten Doeschate 117 (171); CAJ Meschede 5/84 (24.5 overs)	County Cricket Ground, Chelmsford; Umpires: Russell Evans and Steve O'Shaughnessy
Scorecard	296 (82.2 overs); MA Wallace 78 (91); RN ten Doeschate 2/20 (7 overs)		252 (87.5 overs); V Chopra 79 (180); MG Hogan 5/45 (22 overs)	County Cricket Ground, Chelmsford; Umpires: Russell Evans and Steve O'Shaughnessy
Glamorgan won the toss and elected to bat first; Points: Glamorgan 21, Essex 6

12–15 September	(H) Northamptonshire	v	Gloucestershire	Northamptonshire won by 114 runs
Scorecard	326 (99 overs); RI Newton 130 (223); DA Payne 4/57 (23 overs)		261 (79.3 overs); DA Payne 56 (65); RI Keogh 4/67 (17.3 overs)	County Cricket Ground, Northampton; Umpires: Stephen Gale and Martin Saggers
Scorecard	376 (86.1 overs); RE Levi 95 (114); DA Payne 4/75 (18 overs)		252 (87.5 overs); GT Hankins 116 (177); BW Sanderson 8/73 (29.5 overs)	County Cricket Ground, Northampton; Umpires: Stephen Gale and Martin Saggers
Uncontested, Gloucestershire elected to field first; Points: Northamptonshire 22, Gloucestershire 5

12–14 September	Worcestershire	v	(H) Sussex	Worcestershire won by 11 runs
Scorecard	306 (80.2 overs); DKH Mitchell 75 (152); SJ Magoffin 5/38 (19 overs)		229 (46 overs); CJ Jordan 57* (82); ML Cummins 7/84 (19 overs)	County Cricket Ground, Hove; Umpires: Neil Bainton and Ian Gould
Scorecard	194 (55 overs); TC Fell 85 (126); SJ Magoffin 5/32 (15 overs)		260 (60.3 overs); D Wiese 70* (80); ML Cummins 5/82 (17.3 overs)	County Cricket Ground, Hove; Umpires: Neil Bainton and Ian Gould
Worcestershire won the toss and elected to bat; Points: Worcestershire 22, Sussex 4

20–23 September	(H) Gloucestershire	v	Sussex	Match drawn
Scorecard	229 (79.1 overs); CDJ Dent 90 (193); SJ Magoffin 3/36 (22 overs)		435 (128.5 overs); BC Brown 118* (173); J Shaw 5/79 (24 overs)	County Cricket Ground, Bristol; Umpires: Paul Baldwin and Martin Saggers
Scorecard	337/7 (111 overs); P Mustard 90* (213); DR Briggs 5/93 (39 overs)			County Cricket Ground, Bristol; Umpires: Paul Baldwin and Martin Saggers
Uncontested, Sussex elected to field first; First-class debut: James Bracey (Gloucestershire); Points: Sussex 11, Gloucestershire 8

20–23 September	(H) Kent	v	Essex	Match drawn
Scorecard	441 (108.1 overs); DI Stevens 136 (161); MW Dixon 5/124 (28.1 overs)		292 (82.4 overs); DW Lawrence 88 (156); GC Viljoen 3/69 (14 overs)	St Lawrence Ground, Canterbury; Umpires: Russell Evans and Graham Lloyd
Scorecard	288/5 (67 overs); SA Northeast 178* (177); DD Masters 2/32 (17 overs)			St Lawrence Ground, Canterbury; Umpires: Russell Evans and Graham Lloyd
Uncontested, Essex elected to field first; Essex won the 2016 County Championship Division Two; Points: Kent 13, Essex 10

20–22 September	(H) Leicestershire	v	Glamorgan	Leicestershire won by 26 runs
Scorecard	96 (29.3 overs); PJ Horton 25 (52); T van der Gugten 5/52 (12 overs)		199 (42.2 overs); KS Carlson 74* (74); CJ McKay 3/12 (7.2 overs)	Grace Road, Leicester; Umpires: Steve Garratt and Billy Taylor
Scorecard	283 (94.3 overs); NJ Dexter 73 (147); T van der Gugten 4/81 (26.3 overs)		154 (39.3 overs); WD Bragg 65 (97); CE Shreck 4/33 (11.3 overs)	Grace Road, Leicester; Umpires: Steve Garratt and Billy Taylor
Uncontested, Glamorgan elected to field first; Points: Leicestershire 19, Glamorgan 3

20–23 September	(H) Worcestershire	v	Derbyshire	Worcestershire won by 9 wickets
Scorecard	475/7d (137 overs); JM Clarke 194 (329); BD Cotton 3/63 (20 overs)		248 (85.3 overs); HR Hosein 108 (249); J Leach 5/60 (19.3 overs)	New Road, Worcester; Umpires: Nigel Cowley and Stephen Gale
Scorecard	43/1 (9.3 overs); DKH Mitchell 28* (34); TP Milnes 1/14 (5 overs)		266 (80.5 overs) (f/o); WL Madsen 100 (123); DKH Mitchell 2/5 (4 overs)	New Road, Worcester; Umpires: Nigel Cowley and Stephen Gale
Uncontested, Derbyshire elected to field first; First-class debut: Greg Cork (Derbyshire); Points: Worcestershire 23, Derbyshire 3

== Statistics ==
As of 20 January 2017

=== Division One ===
==== Most runs ====
Player	Team	Matches	Innings	Runs	Average	HS	100s	50s
Keaton Jennings	Durham	16	28	1,548	64.50	221*	7	2
Nick Gubbins	Middlesex	16	24	1,409	61.26	201*	4	9
Marcus Trescothick	Somerset	16	27	1,239	51.62	218	4	4
Mark Stoneman	Durham	16	28	1,234	45.70	141*	2	5
Haseeb Hameed	Lancashire	16	27	1,198	49.91	122	4	7

==== Most wickets ====
Player	Team	Matches	Overs	Wickets	Average	BBI	5W	10W
Jeetan Patel	Warwickshire	16	616.4	69	24.02	5/32	4	1
Jack Leach	Somerset	15	526.3	65	21.87	6/42	5	0
Jack Brooks	Yorkshire	14	432.2	60	25.01	6/65	3	0
Keith Barker	Warwickshire	16	522.1	59	23.13	5/53	1	0
Toby Roland-Jones	Middlesex	15	482.2	54	28.22	6/54	2	1
Graham Onions	Durham	16	544.0	54	31.25	5/90	1	0

=== Division Two ===
==== Most runs ====
Player	Team	Matches	Innings	Runs	Average	HS	100s	50s
Ben Duckett	Northamptonshire	14	24	1,338	60.81	282*	4	5
Sam Northeast	Kent	15	22	1,337	83.56	191	5	3
Wayne Madsen	Derbyshire	15	26	1,292	58.72	163	6	3
Mark Cosgrove	Leicestershire	16	27	1,279	49.19	146	5	5
Chris Nash	Sussex	15	24	1,256	54.60	144	3	9

==== Most wickets ====
Player	Team	Matches	Overs	Wickets	Average	BBI	5W	10W
Joe Leach	Worcestershire	15	495.4	65	27.47	5/60	5	0
Graham Napier	Essex	14	451.3	63	23.17	5/59	4	0
Steve Magoffin	Sussex	16	523.1	62	20.14	5/32	5	1
Clint McKay	Leicestershire	15	411.1	56	22.50	6/73	1	0
Timm van der Gugten	Glamorgan	13	450.0	56	26.03	5/52	5	0
