= Hardus Viljoen =

South African cricketer (born 1989)

Personal information
- Full name: GC Viljoen (Note: Viljoen's name is GC. These are not his initials.)
- Born: 6 March 1989 (age 37); Witbank, Transvaal Province, South Africa
- Batting: Right-handed
- Bowling: Right-arm fast
- Role: Bowler

International information
- National side: South Africa
- Only Test (cap 325): 14 January 2016 v England

Domestic team information
- Years: Team
- 2008/09–2011/12: Easterns
- 2009/10–2011/12: Titans
- 2012/13–2017/18: Lions
- 2016: Kent
- 2017–2018: Derbyshire
- 2018: Multan Sultans
- 2019: Chittagong Vikings
- 2019: Lahore Qalandars
- 2019: Kings XI Punjab
- 2019: Kent (squad no. 17)
- 2019: Paarl Rocks

Career statistics
Competition	Test	FC	LA	T20
Matches	1	113	92	109
Runs scored	26	2,099	629	447
Batting average	26.00	14.88	16.55	12.77
100s/50s	0/0	0/7	0/3	0/0
Top score	20*	72	54*	41*
Balls bowled	114	19,747	4,138	2,350
Wickets	1	438	127	128
Bowling average	94.00	26.83	32.25	24.28
5 wickets in innings	0	25	1	1
10 wickets in match	0	5	0	0
Best bowling	1/79	8/90	6/19	5/16
Catches/stumpings	0/–	31/–	21/–	21/–
- Source: ESPNcricinfo, 9 September 2019

GC Viljoen (born 6 March 1989), known as Hardus Viljoen, is a South African professional cricketer. Viljoen played for Lions in domestic cricket and made one Test match appearance for the South Africa national team. He is a right-arm fast bowler.

== Career ==
Viljoen was called up to the South African squad for the first time on the last day of 2015 as cover for Kyle Abbott. He made his Test debut on 14 January 2016 against England, taking the wicket of England captain Alastair Cook with his first ball in Test cricket, the 20th player to achieve this feat.

Viljoen joined Kent County Cricket Club for a short spell in English county cricket in August 2016, playing in the final four matches of the 2016 County Championship season. He made his County Championship debut on 23 August against Gloucestershire at Bristol, taking five wickets on the first day of the match. At the end of the season Kent made a contract offer to Viljoen but were unwilling to match a more lucrative offer made by Derbyshire who signed the player on a three-year Kolpak contract in December 2016. After playing for the county for two seasons the contract was terminated "by mutual consent" in January 2019, with Viljoen signing in June to play for Kent in the 2019 t20 Blast.

In December 2018, he was bought by the Kings XI Punjab in the player auction for the 2019 Indian Premier League. In July 2019, he was selected to play for the Rotterdam Rhinos in the inaugural edition of the Euro T20 Slam cricket tournament. However, the following month the tournament was cancelled.

In September 2019, he was named in the squad for the Paarl Rocks team for the 2019 Mzansi Super League tournament. In April 2021, he was named in Boland's squad, ahead of the 2021–22 cricket season in South Africa. In July 2022, he was signed by the Jaffna Kings for the third edition of the Lanka Premier League.

== Personal life ==
In December 2019, he married Rhemi Rynners, the sister of South African international cricketer Faf du Plessis.
