= Jack Brooks (cricketer) =

English cricketer

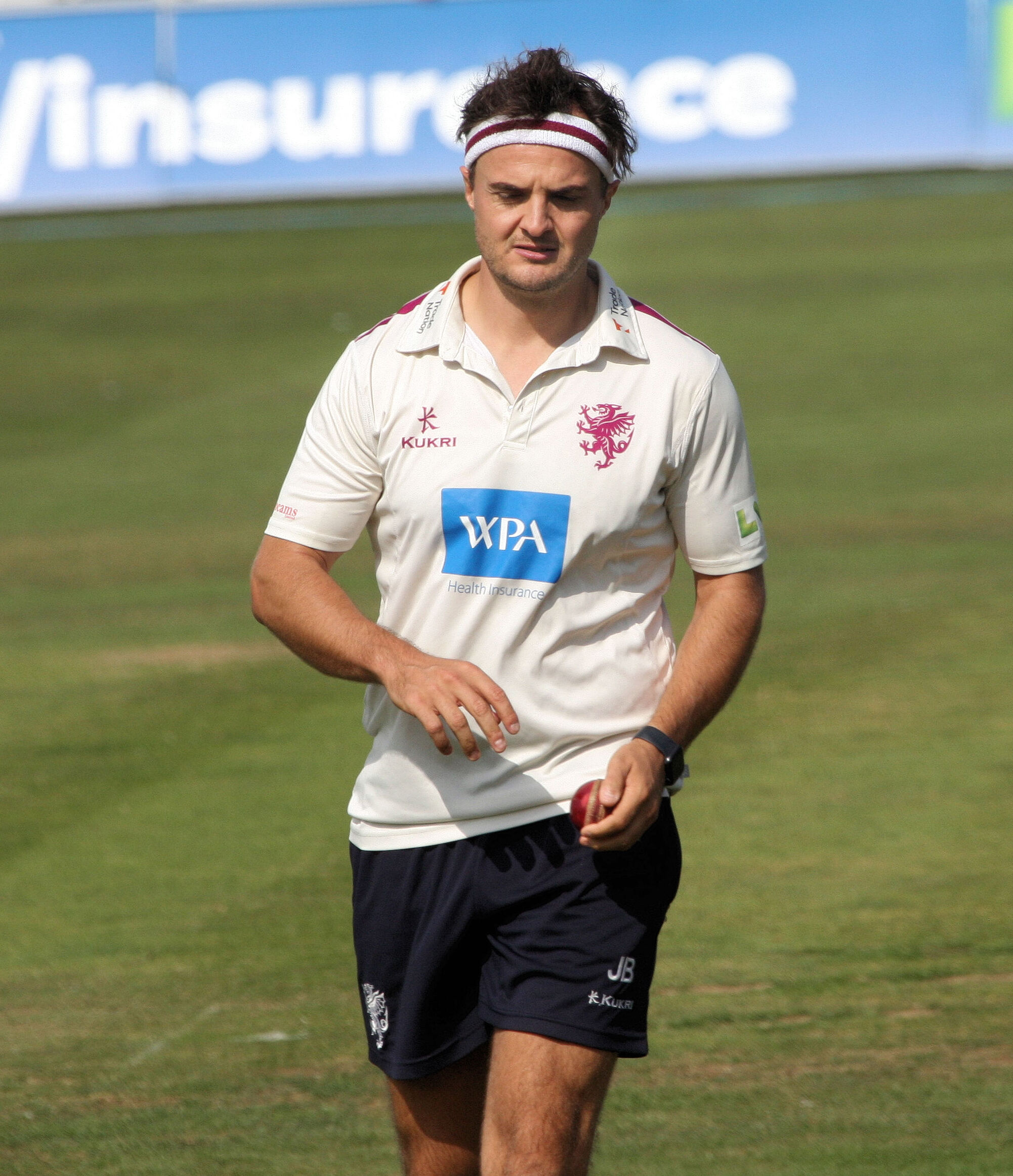
- Brooks in 2021

Personal information
- Full name: Jack Alexander Brooks
- Born: 4 June 1984 (age 42); Oxford, Oxfordshire, England
- Nickname: Susan Boyle, Subo, Ferret, Don Jnr, Yorath, Brooksy, Animal, Headband Warrior
- Height: 6 ft 2 in (1.88 m)
- Batting: Right-handed
- Bowling: Right-arm medium-fast
- Role: Bowler

Domestic team information
- Years: Team
- 2004–2008: Oxfordshire
- 2009–2012: Northamptonshire
- 2013–2018: Yorkshire
- 2019–2023: Somerset
- 2022: → Sussex (on loan)
- 2023: → Worcestershire (on loan)
- 2023: → Nottinghamshire (on loan)
- First-class debut: 24 July 2009 Northamptonshire v Australians
- List A debut: 31 August 2009 Northamptonshire v Warwickshire

Career statistics
| Competition | FC | LA | T20 |
|---|---|---|---|
| Matches | 154 | 51 | 76 |
| Runs scored | 2,103 | 152 | 77 |
| Batting average | 16.69 | 9.50 | 12.83 |
| 100s/50s | 1/5 | 0/0 | 0/0 |
| Top score | 109* | 28 | 33* |
| Balls bowled | 25,084 | 2,319 | 1,429 |
| Wickets | 531 | 58 | 72 |
| Bowling average | 27.66 | 33.48 | 25.72 |
| 5 wickets in innings | 22 | 0 | 1 |
| 10 wickets in match | 0 | 0 | 0 |
| Best bowling | 6/65 | 4/38 | 5/21 |
| Catches/stumpings | 35/– | 6/– | 19/– |
- Source: ESPNcricinfo, 29 September 2023

Jack Alexander Brooks (born 4 June 1984) is an English professional cricket player, who most recently played for Somerset after successful spells at Oxfordshire in the Minor Counties, and Northamptonshire and Yorkshire in first-class cricket. He is predominantly a right arm medium fast bowler who can also bat. Brooks retired in 2023 and became a professional coach, currently with Surrey.

== Career ==
Brooks played for Oxfordshire between 2004 and 2008. He played for Northamptonshire Second XI at the end of the 2008 season before signing a professional contract with the club for the 2009 season. He made his professional debut against the Australian tourist team taking the wickets of Andrew McDonald and Mitchell Johnson. He hoped that his performance against Australia would lead to more first-class matches. On his Northants debut, he took 4 wickets for 76 against Derbyshire. He signed a two-year contract extension on 2 September 2009, keeping him at the club until the end of the 2011 season. During the 2010 season, Brooks was a regular in the team opening the bowling.

Brooks signed up to play for Yorkshire in October 2012, becoming a key part of the county's back-to-back Championship wins in 2014 and 2015.

In the 2016 County Championship season, he took more wickets in Division One than any other fast bowler.

During the 2017 season Brooks scored his maiden first class century against Yorkshire's rivals Lancashire, helping to earn his team a valuable draw in their fight for Division 1 survival.

Jack is known for his trademark headband, earning him the nickname "The Headband Warrior", originally worn functionally to keep his lustrous, flowing locks out of his eyes while bowling, Jack has continued wearing the headband as an affectation despite a new, shorter hair style.

On 28 August 2018, Brooks agreed a three-year contract with Somerset ahead of the 2019 season.

In November 2021, Brooks became involved in the Azeem Rafiq racism scandal after he was named at the DCMS hearing on 16 November as having given Cheteshwar Pujara the nickname 'Steve', even though Pujara preferred his first name. It also came to light that Brooks had made use of possibly offensive language in two Twitter responses to friends of African heritage. Somerset have launched an investigation against him.
