= Alex Mellor (cricketer) =

English cricketer (born 1991)

Personal information
- Full name: Alexander James Mellor
- Born: 22 July 1991 (age 35); Stoke-on-Trent, Staffordshire, England
- Height: 5 ft 10 in (1.78 m)
- Batting: Left-handed
- Role: Wicket-keeper

Domestic team information
- Years: Team
- 2016–2019: Warwickshire (squad no. 15)
- 2016: → Derbyshire (on loan)
- First-class debut: 4 August 2016 Derbyshire v Leicestershire
- List A debut: 31 July 2016 Derbyshire v Northamptonshire

Career statistics
Competition	FC	LA	T20
Matches	9	7	10
Runs scored	282	92	38
Batting average	18.80	46.00	12.66
100s/50s	0/1	0/1	0/0
Top score	59	58	18*
Catches/stumpings	15/0	4/0	4/0
- Source: ESPNcricinfo, 30 September 2019

Alexander James Mellor (born 22 July 1991) is an English cricketer who most recently played for Warwickshire. He is a left-handed batsman who also plays as a wicket-keeper.

== Cricket career ==
Mellor joined Warwickshire from Staffordshire at the end of the 2015 season.

On 28 July 2016, Mellor joined Derbyshire on loan from Warwickshire, after regular wicket-keeper Harvey Hosein fractured his thumb. He made his Twenty20 debut for Derbyshire, on 29 July 2016, against Durham.

During the 2017 season, Warwickshire recalled Mellor as back up to the injured Tim Ambrose. However, having also been promoted to open the batting he was unable to take his opportunity, and averaged just 9.83 across three country championship matches.
