= Adam Hickey =

English cricketer (born 1997)

Adam James Hickey
Personal information
- Full name: Adam James Hickey
- Born: 1 March 1997 (age 29); Darlington, County Durham, England
- Height: 6 ft 3 in (1.91 m)
- Batting: Left-handed
- Bowling: Right-arm off break
- Role: All-rounder

Domestic team information
- Years: Team
- 2016–2017: Durham (squad no. 21)
- First-class debut: 26 June 2016 Durham v Sri Lanka A
- Twenty20 debut: 8 July 2017 Durham v Lancashire

Career statistics
Competition	FC	T20
Matches	4	4
Runs scored	92	25
Batting average	23.00	8.33
100s/50s	0/0	0/0
Top score	36*	15
Balls bowled	377	18
Wickets	6	1
Bowling average	34.00	11.00
5 wickets in innings	0	0
10 wickets in match	0	n/a
Best bowling	2/19	1/11
Catches/stumpings	1/–	1/–
- Source: CricketArchive, 8 September 2017

Adam James Hickey (born 1 March 1997) is an English cricketer. He made his first-class debut on 26 June 2016 for Durham against a touring Sri Lanka A side. He made his Twenty20 debut for Durham against Lancashire in the 2017 NatWest t20 Blast on 7 July 2017.
