= Tom Milnes =

English cricketer (born 1992)

Personal information
- Full name: Thomas Patrick Milnes
- Born: 6 October 1992 (age 34); Stourbridge, West Midlands, England
- Batting: Right-handed
- Bowling: Right-arm fast-medium
- Role: Bowler

Domestic team information
- Years: Team
- 2011–2015: Warwickshire (squad no. 8)
- 2015–2018: Derbyshire (squad no. 8)
- 2019: Warwickshire
- FC debut: 9 April 2011 Warwickshire v Durham MCCU
- LA debut: 11 August 2013 Warwickshire v Netherlands

Career statistics
Competition	FC	LA	T20
Matches	26	8	1
Runs scored	638	22	0
Batting average	19.93	11.00	0.00
100s/50s	0/3	0/0	0/0
Top score	56	16	0
Balls bowled	3,257	270	18
Wickets	47	3	0
Bowling average	43.31	90.50	–
5 wickets in innings	2	0	–
10 wickets in match	0	0	–
Best bowling	7/39	2/73	–
Catches/stumpings	6/–	1/–	0/–
- Source: Cricinfo, 14 April 2019

Thomas Patrick Milnes (born 6 October 1992) is an English first-class cricketer who played for Derbyshire. He is a right-handed batsman who bowls right-arm fast-medium. He was born at Stourbridge, Worcestershire.

Milnes made a single Youth Test appearance for England Under-19s against Sri Lanka Under-19s in January 2011 at the Galle International Stadium. Later during the tour he made three Youth One Day International appearances.

During the 2011 English cricket season, Milnes made his first-class debut for Warwickshire against Durham MCCU at The Racecourse Ground, Durham. In what was his only appearance for Warwickshire in that season, Milnes scored 23 runs in Warwickshire's first-innings, before being dismissed by Alex Deuchar, while in Durham MCCU's second-innings he took figures of 4/15. He was part of the Warwickshire squad that won the 2012 County Championship, playing in three matches.

Milnes joined Derbyshire on loan in July 2015, making his debut for in a County Championship fixture against Surrey at The Oval. After it was announced in September 2015 that Milnes was to be released by Warwickshire, he signed a two-year contract with Derbyshire. Milnes was released by Derbyshire in January 2018. After playing for the Sussex second XI during 2018, Milnes signed for a second spell at Warwickshire.
