= Nick Gubbins =

English cricketer (born 1993)

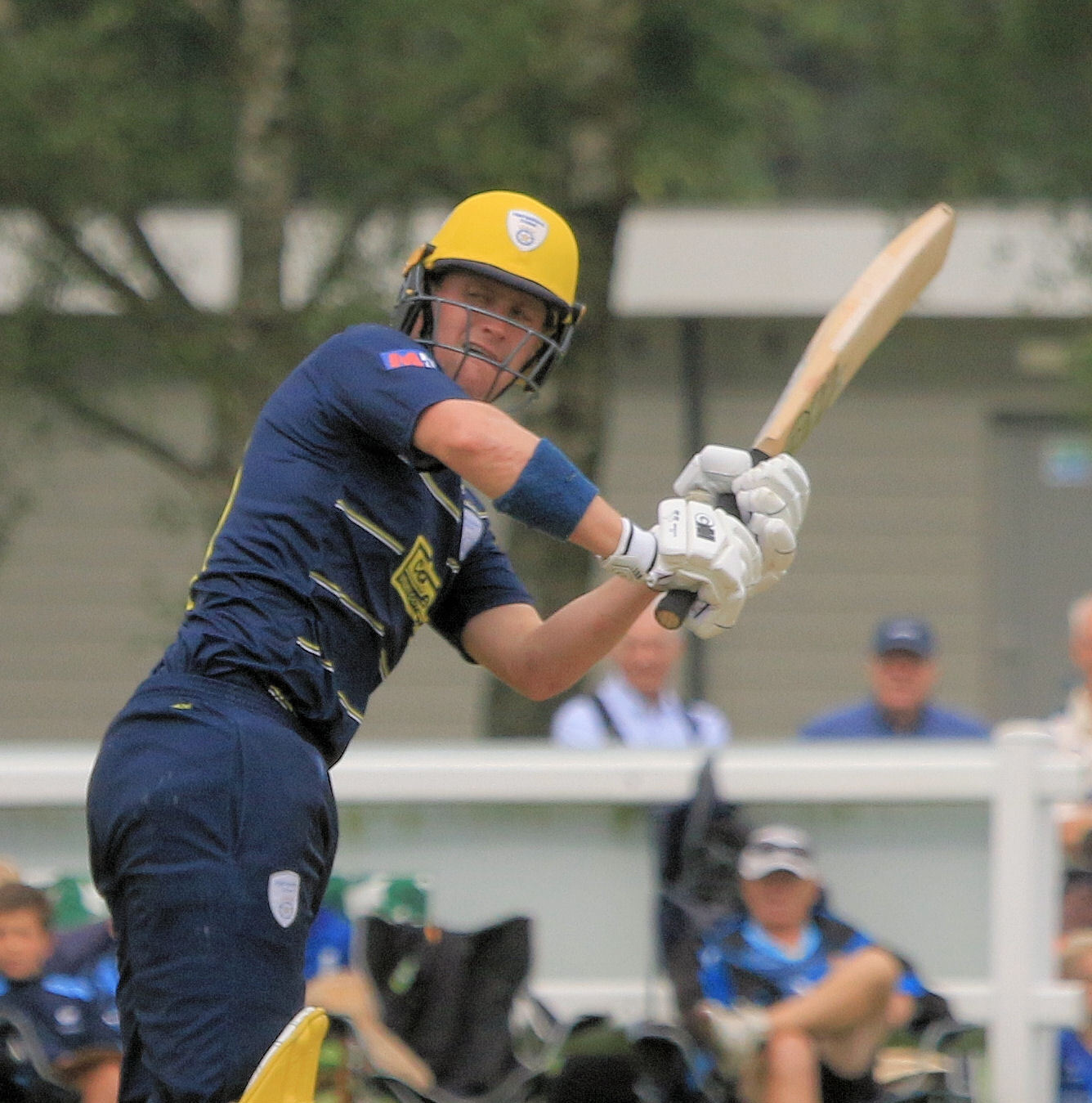
- Gubbins in 2023

Personal information
- Full name: Nicholas Richard Trail Gubbins
- Born: 31 December 1993 (age 32); Richmond, London, England
- Batting: Left-handed
- Bowling: Right-arm leg break
- Role: Batsman

Domestic team information
- Years: Team
- 2013–2021: Middlesex (squad no. 18)
- 2013–2015: Leeds/Bradford MCCU
- 2021: → Hampshire (on loan) (squad no. 31)
- 2021/22: Matabeleland Tuskers
- 2022–2026: Hampshire (squad no. 31)
- 2022/23: Southern Rocks
- FC debut: 5 April 2013 Leeds/Bradford MCCU v Yorkshire
- LA debut: 26 July 2014 Middlesex v Glamorgan

Career statistics
Competition	FC	LA	T20
Matches	162	108	49
Runs scored	9,676	4,405	641
Batting average	35.44	43.61	14.90
100s/50s	21/49	11/26	0/2
Top score	201*	144*	57*
Balls bowled	571	637	162
Wickets	8	14	10
Bowling average	43.62	44.78	21.20
5 wickets in innings	0	0	0
10 wickets in match	0	0	0
Best bowling	4/41	4/38	3/27
Catches/stumpings	57/–	41/–	17/–
- Source: ESPNcricinfo, 26 September 2026

Nicholas Richard Trail Gubbins (born 31 December 1993) is an English first-class cricketer who plays for Hampshire.

He is a left-handed batsman and right arm leg spin bowler. He made his first-class debut for Leeds/Bradford MCCU against Yorkshire, on 5 April 2013. He made his Middlesex debut in the summer of 2014 against Northamptonshire and immediately impressed in his first 2 matches, scoring three 50s which included a top score of 95.

He joined Hampshire, initially on loan, in July 2021. He officially left Middlesex at that time, intending to join Hampshire on a permanent basis at the end of the season-long loan period.
