= Rob Hemmings =

English cricketer (born 1996)

Personal information
- Full name: Robert Philip Hemmings
- Born: 28 February 1996 (age 30); Stoke-on-Trent, Staffordshire, England
- Batting: Right-handed
- Bowling: Right-arm fast-medium

Domestic team information
- Years: Team
- 2016–2018: Derbyshire (squad no. 24)
- First-class debut: 20 June 2016 Derbyshire v Worcestershire
- List A debut: 15 July 2016 Derbyshire v Sri Lanka A

Career statistics
| Competition | First-class | List A |
|---|---|---|
| Matches | 2 | 2 |
| Runs scored | 19 | 25 |
| Batting average | 19.00 | – |
| 100s/50s | 0/0 | 0/0 |
| Top score | 19 | 25* |
| Balls bowled | 258 | 48 |
| Wickets | 0 | 0 |
| Bowling average | – | – |
| 5 wickets in innings | – | – |
| 10 wickets in match | – | n/a |
| Best bowling | – | – |
| Catches/stumpings | 1/– | 0/– |
- Source: Cricinfo, 29 May 2017

Robert Philip Hemmings (born 28 February 1996) is an English cricketer who most recently played for Derbyshire County Cricket Club. Primarily a right-arm fast-medium bowler, he also bats right handed.
