= Josh Poysden =

English cricketer

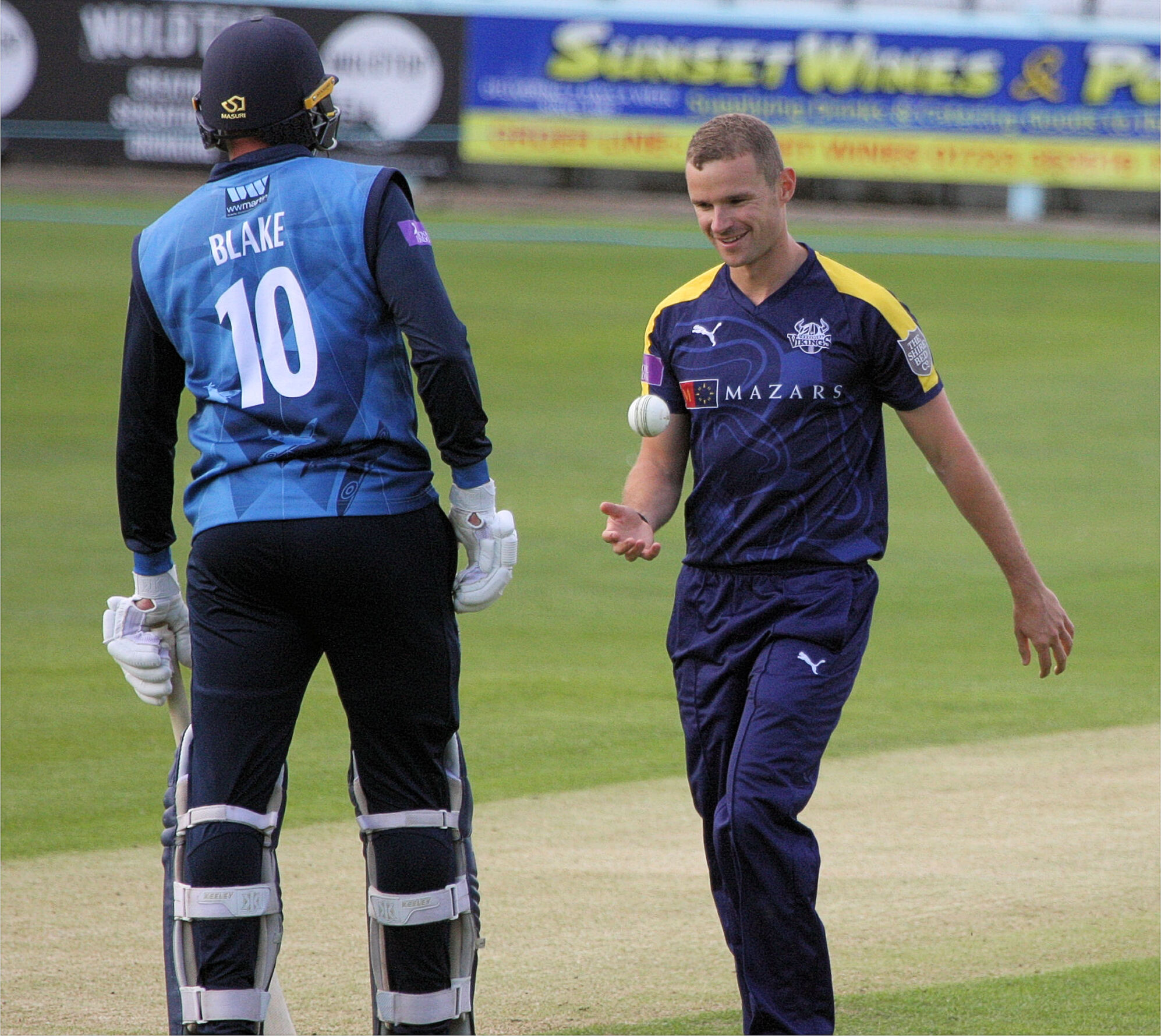
- Poysden in 2019

Personal information
- Full name: Joshua Edward Poysden
- Born: 8 August 1991 (age 35); Shoreham-by-Sea, West Sussex, England
- Height: 5 ft 2 in (1.57 m)
- Batting: Left-handed
- Bowling: Right-arm leg break

Domestic team information
- Years: Team
- 2011–2013: Cambridge MCCU
- 2013: Unicorns
- 2014–2018: Warwickshire (squad no. 14)
- 2018: → Yorkshire (on loan)
- 2019–2021: Yorkshire (squad no. 14)

Career statistics
Competition	FC	LA	T20
Matches	14	32	33
Runs scored	96	35	13
Batting average	9.60	3.50	6.50
100s/50s	0/0	0/0	0/0
Top score	47	10*	9*
Balls bowled	1,549	1,281	598
Wickets	33	30	26
Bowling average	32.84	41.60	29.57
5 wickets in innings	2	0	0
10 wickets in match	0	0	0
Best bowling	5/29	3/33	4/51
Catches/stumpings	2/–	7/–	8/–
- Source: CricketArchive, 24 July 2021

Joshua Edward Poysden (born 8 August 1991) is a former English cricketer. Poysden is a left-handed batsman who bowls leg breaks. He was born in Shoreham-by-Sea, Sussex. He was educated at Cardinal Newman Catholic School, Hove and undertook further studies at Anglia Ruskin University.

While studying for his degree at Anglia Ruskin, Poysden made his first-class debut for Cambridge MCCU against Essex in 2011. In this match, he took his maiden first-class wicket, that of Mark Pettini. He made a further first-class appearance in the 2011 season, against Surrey. Poysden scored 47 runs in Cambridge MCCU's first-innings, before being dismissed by Matthew Spriegel. He also took three wickets in the match.

On 31 July 2015, Poysden took a catch to dismiss Mitchell Starc off the bowling of Moeen Ali while fielding as a substitute in the third Ashes Test match.

In August 2018, Poysden joined Yorkshire on loan for the remainder of the 2018 season before signing a three-year contract from the start of the 2019 season.

In July 2019, Poysden suffered a fractured skull during a training session, and was ruled out of the rest of the season.
