= Ben Cotton (cricketer) =

English cricketer (born 1993)

Personal information
- Full name: Benjamin David Cotton
- Born: 13 September 1993 (age 33); Stoke-on-Trent, Staffordshire, England
- Batting: Right-handed
- Bowling: Right-arm medium-fast
- Role: Bowler

Domestic team information
- Years: Team
- 2014–2017: Derbyshire (squad no. 36)
- 2014; 2021: Staffordshire
- 2018: Northamptonshire
- FC debut: 15 September 2014 Derbyshire v Surrey
- LA debut: 11 August 2014 Derbyshire v Northants

Career statistics
Competition	FC	LA	T20
Matches	23	30	18
Runs scored	346	71	45
Batting average	15.72	17.75	22.50
100s/50s	0/0	0/0	0/0
Top score	43	18*	30*
Balls bowled	3,191	1,271	334
Wickets	47	32	20
Bowling average	37.04	37.06	24.85
5 wickets in innings	1	0	0
10 wickets in match	0	0	0
Best bowling	5/48	4/20	4/43
Catches/stumpings	5/–	4/–	3/–
- Source: CricketArchive, 28 September 2018

Benjamin David Cotton (born 13 September 1993) is an English cricketer. Cotton played for Derbyshire between 2014 and 2017 in first-class matches as a right-handed batsman who bowls right arm medium-fast pace. He played youth cricket for Newcastle-under-Lyme's Porthill Park Cricket Club. In 2018, he joined Northamptonshire.
