= Shiv Thakor =

English cricketer

Personal information
- Full name: Shivsinh Jaysinh Thakor
- Born: 23 October 1993 (age 33); Leicester, England
- Batting: Right-handed
- Bowling: Right-arm medium

Domestic team information
- Years: Team
- 2010–2014: Leicestershire (squad no. 57)
- 2015–2017: Derbyshire (squad no. 57)
- FC debut: 20 April 2011 Leicestershire v Loughborough MCCU
- LA debut: 24 April 2011 Leicestershire v Northamptonshire

Career statistics
Competition	FC	LA	T20
Matches	51	47	34
Runs scored	2,571	817	270
Batting average	37.80	24.02	12.27
100s/50s	5/12	1/5	0/0
Top score	134	130	42
Balls bowled	3,788	1,470	561
Wickets	57	51	32
Bowling average	43.01	28.00	23.81
5 wickets in innings	1	0	0
10 wickets in match	0	0	0
Best bowling	5/63	4/49	3/17
Catches/stumpings	11/–	8/–	7/–
- Source: CricketArchive, 11 June 2017

Shivsinh Jaysinh Thakor (born 22 October 1993) is an English cricketer who most recently played for Derbyshire County Cricket Club.

A right-handed batsman and occasional right-arm medium-pace bowler, he previously played for Leicestershire, making his First-class debut in April 2011 as a 17-year-old against Loughborough MCCU, where he became the youngest Leicestershire player to score a century.

== Early life ==
Thakor was born in Leicester to parents from Gujarat, India and educated at Loughborough Grammar School then Uppingham School, where he excelled at cricket. He is now a free agent having been found guilty of exposing himself to two women without consent.

== Playing career ==
=== Leicestershire ===
Thakor signed a three-year deal with Leicestershire as a 17-year-old, in November 2010.

In March 2011, Thakor won the Young Sports Personality of the Year at the 10th annual British Asian Sports Awards ceremony. Thakor has often been hailed as the British Asian community's next great cricketing hope and has drawn comparisons with greats like Viv Richards, Marcus Trescothick and his idol Sachin Tendulkar.

Thakor made his first-class debut for Leicestershire in a university match against Loughborough MCCU at Grace Road in April 2011. In the first and only innings he came to the crease with Leicestershire at 63–4, and he and teammate James Taylor put on a Leicestershire fifth-wicket record partnership of 330. Thakor scored 134 on his first-class debut, becoming Leicestershire's youngest centurion as well as the first Leicestershire born batsman to make a century on debut.

Thakor was quick to acknowledge James Taylor's calming effect upon reaching his century.

Four days after his debut, Thakor was called up for his List A against Northamptonshire at Northampton. Thakor scored 13, coming in at number six in a seven-wicket loss for Leicestershire.

The following day he followed up his debut with a one-day match against Scotland. Thakor came in at number five and scored 13, which included a six as Leicestershire recorded a 32-run victory.

His next taste of first-class cricket came on 2 August 2011 as he was selected to play against Kent in a drawn match at Grace Road. Thakor scored 10 in his first innings, as Leicestershire were bowled out for 257. In his second innings, he scored 34 in 100 balls, to help Leicestershire towards a healthy total.

=== Derbyshire ===
In 2015 Thakor signed for Derbyshire, and was selected for the opening game of the season vs Lancashire, taking 2-28 including the wicket of Ashwell Prince.

=== Youth international cricket ===
Thakor has represented England at under-15, under-17 and under-19 levels. He was also selected to captain England under-17 in a triangular series against Scotland and Ireland.

Thakor played in the under-19 series against Sri Lanka in January 2011. He participated in a four-day youth Test match in which he scored 47 from 123 balls in a drawn match at the Galle International Stadium. In the second test he scored 13 and 44 in another drawn match. Thakor underperformed in the one day series, top scoring with just 18 in a disappointing 1–3 defeat for England in the series.

In December 2012, Thakor was named the captain of the England under-19 team for their tour of South Africa in January 2013, where they would play two four-day Tests and five one-day internationals. However, he was ruled out of the tour after sustaining a broken finger in the opening match of the trip against Western Cape Invitation XI.

== Personal life ==
In June 2017, Thakor was suspended by Derbyshire after allegations of indecent exposure towards two female estate agents. Thakor was being shown around a new house when it is alleged he "catastrophically misread the signals and was found in a bedroom in a state of undress." During police interview, Thakor stated that he had already been "sexually satisfied" by his "16-year-old girlfriend" so he would not have committed the offences. He was subsequently arrested and found guilty in relation to the alleged incident. On 21 November 2017 his contract with Derbyshire County Cricket Club was terminated. At his sentencing he was placed on the sex offenders register for 5 years and was also given a three-year community order and ordered to pay over £1,000 in costs.
