= Harvey Hosein =

English cricketer (born 1996)

Personal information
- Full name: Harvey Richard Hosein
- Born: 12 August 1996 (age 30); Chesterfield, Derbyshire, England
- Batting: Right-handed
- Role: Wicket-keeper

Domestic team information
- Years: Team
- 2014–2021: Derbyshire (squad no. 16)
- First-class debut: 15 September 2014 Derbyshire v Surrey
- List A debut: 15 July 2016; Derbyshire v Sri Lanka A

Career statistics
Competition	FC	LA	T20
Matches	59	14	10
Runs scored	2,580	177	11
Batting average	32.25	25.28	–
100s/50s	2/20	0/0	0/0
Top score	138*	41*	10*
Catches/stumpings	132/5	8/3	8/0
- Source: ESPNcricinfo, 15 August 2021

Harvey Richard Hosein (born 12 August 1996) is an English former professional cricketer who played for Derbyshire County Cricket Club. He is a right-handed batsman who also played as a wicket-keeper.

Hosein equalled the world record for the most catches taken on debut with seven in a County Championship innings against Surrey in September 2014. In the same match he set a new Derbyshire record for the most catches in the first-class match with eleven.

In October 2021, Hosein retired from cricket following a series of concussions.
