= 2017 County Championship =

Cricket tournament

- Tournament logo
- Dates: 7 April – 28 September 2017
- Administrator: England and Wales Cricket Board
- Cricket format: First-class cricket (4 days)
- Tournament format: League system
- Champions: Essex
- Participants: 18
- Most runs: Kumar Sangakkara (1,491) (Div 1); Luke Wells (1,292) (Div 2)
- Most wickets: Jamie Porter (75) (Div 1); Joe Leach (69) (Div 2)

The 2017 County Championship (known for sponsorship reasons as the 2017 Specsavers County Championship), was the 118th cricket County Championship season. It was announced in March 2016 that the season would feature eight teams in Division One and ten teams in Division Two, meaning that at the end of the 2016 season only one team was promoted from Division Two whilst two were relegated from Division One. The first round of fixtures began on 7 April, with the final matches completed on 28 September. All of the fixtures starting on 26 June 2017 were played as day/night matches.

Following a series of financial "bailout" payments made by the England and Wales Cricket Board to Durham during the 2016 season, the county, which had finished fourth in Division One at the end of the season, were relegated to Division Two in place of the eighth place team, Hampshire. Durham were also placed under a salary cap administered by the ECB until 2020 and started the 2017 Championship season with a deduction of 48 points. Ahead of the season, each team played a first-class match against a MCC University team.

== Teams ==
The 2017 Championship was divided into two divisions, Division One with eight teams, Division Two with 10 teams.

Teams in both divisions played a total of 14 games, with all Division One teams playing each other twice, while Division Two teams played five counties twice and four once.

Home grounds of each County.

=== Division One ===
Team promoted from Division Two

Team	Primary home ground	Other grounds	Coach	Captain	Overseas player(s)	Refs
Essex	County Ground, Chelmsford	—	(England) Chris Silverwood	(Netherlands) Ryan ten Doeschate	(New Zealand) Neil Wagner (Apr–Jun) (Pakistan) Mohammad Amir (Jun–Sep)	
Hampshire	Rose Bowl, Southampton	—	(England) Craig White	(England) James Vince	(Australia) George Bailey	
Lancashire	Old Trafford, Manchester	—	(England) Glen Chapple	(England) Steven Croft	(South Africa) Ryan McLaren	
Middlesex	Lord's, London	Merchant Taylors' School Ground, Northwood; Uxbridge Cricket Club Ground, Uxbridge	(England) Richard Scott	(Australia) Adam Voges	(Australia) Adam Voges	
Somerset	County Ground, Taunton	—	(England) Matthew Maynard	(England) Tom Abell	(South Africa) Dean Elgar	
Surrey	The Oval, London	Woodbridge Road, Guildford	(Australia) Michael Di Venuto	(England) Gareth Batty	(Sri Lanka) Kumar Sangakkara (Australia) Aaron Finch (Jul)	
Warwickshire	Edgbaston, Birmingham	—	(England) Jim Troughton	(England) Ian Bell	(New Zealand) Jeetan Patel	
Yorkshire	Headingley, Leeds	North Marine Road Ground, Scarborough	(England) Andrew Gale	(England) Gary Ballance	(Australia) Peter Handscomb	

=== Division Two ===
Team relegated from Division One

Team	Primary home ground	Other grounds	Coach	Captain	Overseas player(s)	Refs
Derbyshire	County Ground, Derby	Queen's Park, Chesterfield	(England) Kim Barnett	(England) Billy Godleman	(Sri Lanka) Jeevan Mendis (Apr–Jun) (South Africa) Imran Tahir (Jun–Sep)	
Durham	Riverside Ground, Chester-le-Street	—	(England) Jon Lewis	(England) Paul Collingwood	(South Africa) Stephen Cook (Apr–Jun) (New Zealand) Tom Latham (Jun–Sep)	
Glamorgan	SWALEC Stadium, Cardiff	Penrhyn Avenue, Rhos-on-Sea; St Helen's, Swansea	(Wales) Robert Croft	(South Africa) Jacques Rudolph	(South Africa) Jacques Rudolph	
Gloucestershire	County Ground, Bristol	College Ground, Cheltenham	(England) Richard Dawson	(South Africa) Gareth Roderick	(Australia) Cameron Bancroft (Apr–May) (Australia) Michael Klinger (May–Sep)	
Kent	St Lawrence Ground, Canterbury	Kent County Cricket Ground, Beckenham; Nevill Ground, Royal Tunbridge Wells	(England) Matt Walker	(England) Sam Northeast	(South Africa) Wayne Parnell (Apr–May) (Pakistan) Yasir Shah (Jun–Jul) (New Zealand) Adam Milne (Jun–Sep)	
Leicestershire	Grace Road, Leicester	—	(South Africa) Pierre de Bruyn	(Australia) Mark Cosgrove	(Australia) Clint McKay	
Northamptonshire	County Ground, Northampton	—	(England) David Ripley	(England) Alex Wakely	(South Africa) Rory Kleinveldt	
Nottinghamshire	Trent Bridge, Nottingham	—	(England) Peter Moores	(England) Chris Read	(Australia) James Pattinson	
Sussex	County Ground, Hove	Arundel Castle Cricket Club Ground, Arundel	(South Africa) Mark Davis	(England) Luke Wright	(South Africa) Vernon Philander (Apr–Jun)	
Worcestershire	New Road, Worcester	—	(England) Steve Rhodes	(England) Joe Leach	(Australia) John Hastings	

== Standings ==
Teams received 16 points for a win, 8 for a tie and 5 for a draw. Bonus points (a maximum of 5 batting points and 3 bowling points) could be scored during the first 110 overs of each team's first innings.

=== Division One ===
Team	Pld	W	L	D	Bat	Bowl	Ded	Pts
Essex (C)	14	10	0	4	28	40	0	248
Lancashire	14	5	3	6	29	37	0	176
Surrey	14	2	2	10	47	34	0	163
Yorkshire	14	4	5	5	24	35	0	148
Hampshire	14	3	3	8	24	36	0	148
Somerset	14	4	6	4	24	39	0	147
Middlesex (R)	14	3	4	7	28	37	2	146
Warwickshire (R)	14	1	9	4	19	31	0	86

Source: CricInfo

=== Division Two ===
Team	Pld	W	L	T	D	A	Bat	Bowl	Ded	Pts
Worcestershire (P)	14	9	3	0	2	0	45	39	0	238
Nottinghamshire (P)	14	7	2	0	5	0	44	41	0	222
Northamptonshire	14	9	3	0	2	0	29	39	5	217
Sussex	14	7	5	0	2	0	35	39	0	196
Kent	14	4	2	0	7	1	35	36	0	175
Gloucestershire	14	3	4	0	7	0	29	35	0	147
Glamorgan	14	3	7	0	4	0	25	40	0	133
Derbyshire	14	3	7	0	3	1	29	30	0	127
Durham	14	3	6	0	5	0	36	37	48	98
Leicestershire	14	0	9	0	5	0	32	34	16	75

Source: CricInfo

- Worcestershire and Nottinghamshire were promoted to Division One
- Durham were deducted 48 points by the ECB for accepting a financial aid package during the 2016 season.
- Leicestershire were deducted 16 points by the ECB for a breach in player conduct.
- Northamptonshire were deducted five points for a slow over rate against Nottinghamshire in August.

== Fixtures ==
The fixture list for the 2017 season was announced in November 2016.

=== Division One ===
==== April ====
7–10 April 2017	Lancashire	v	Essex (H)	Match drawn
Scorecard	319 (84.1 overs); Dane Vilas 74 (101); Aaron Beard 3/47 (15 overs)		159 (65.4 overs); Ravi Bopara 46 (112); Stephen Parry 3/28 (14.4 overs)	County Ground, Chelmsford; Umpires: Nick Cook and Martin Saggers
Scorecard	317/3d (94.3 overs); Alex Davies 140* (265); Aaron Beard 2/45 (13 overs)		316/6 (133.4 overs); Dan Lawrence 141* (333); Kyle Jarvis 3/58 (27 overs)	County Ground, Chelmsford; Umpires: Nick Cook and Martin Saggers
Lancashire won the toss and elected to bat.; Points: Lancashire 11, Essex 8.

7–10 April 2017	Surrey (H)	v	Warwickshire	Surrey won by an innings and 1 run
Scorecard	454 (140.1 overs); Mark Stoneman 165 (267); Chris Wright 5/113 (29.1 overs)		91 (36.2 overs); Chris Wright 28* (30); Mark Footitt 6/14 (9 overs)	The Oval, London; Umpires: Richard Illingworth and Billy Taylor
Scorecard			362 (118.2 overs) (f/o); Jonathan Trott 151 (291); Tom Curran 4/88 (28.2 overs)	The Oval, London; Umpires: Richard Illingworth and Billy Taylor
No toss, Warwickshire elected to field.; Points: Surrey 23, Warwickshire 1.

7–9 April 2017	Yorkshire (H)	v	Hampshire	Hampshire won by 4 wickets
Scorecard	273 (76.5 overs); Gary Ballance 120 (190); Fidel Edwards 3/58 (14 overs)		141 (48.5 overs); Lewis McManus 41* (75); Ben Coad 6/37 (17 overs)	Headingley, Leeds; Umpires: Richard Kettleborough and Steve O'Shaughnessy
Scorecard	187 (55.3 overs); Gary Ballance 55 (93); Kyle Abbott 7/41 (14 overs)		321/6 (101 overs); James Adams 72 (161); Tim Bresnan 3/73 (25 overs)	Headingley, Leeds; Umpires: Richard Kettleborough and Steve O'Shaughnessy
No toss, Hampshire elected to field.; Points: Hampshire 19, Yorkshire 5.

14–17 April 2017	Middlesex	v	Hampshire (H)	Match drawn
Scorecard	356 (113 overs); Sam Robson 84 (144); Brad Wheal 4/98 (23 overs)		438 (133.4 overs); Rilee Rossouw 99 (143); Dawid Malan 2/19 (3.4 overs)	Rose Bowl, Southampton; Umpires: Rob Bailey and Jeremy Lloyds
Scorecard	278/9d (112 overs); Adam Voges 92 (196); Kyle Abbott 5/59 (25 overs)			Rose Bowl, Southampton; Umpires: Rob Bailey and Jeremy Lloyds
Middlesex won the toss and elected to bat.; Fidel Edwards and Gareth Berg (Hampshire) both played their 100th first-class match.; Points: Hampshire 10, Middlesex 10.

14–16 April 2017	Somerset (H)	v	Essex	Essex won by 8 wickets
Scorecard	209 (72.2 overs); Peter Trego 48 (85); Ashar Zaidi 3/17 (12 overs)		129 (54.5 overs); Alastair Cook 52 (92); Roelof van der Merwe 3/26 (8 overs)	County Ground, Taunton; Umpires: Michael Gough and Graham Lloyd
Scorecard	174 (50.2 overs); James Hildreth 35 (38); Neil Wagner 6/48 (12.2 overs)		257/2 (84.1 overs); Alastair Cook 110 (214); Dean Elgar 1/4 (1 over)	County Ground, Taunton; Umpires: Michael Gough and Graham Lloyd
Somerset won the toss and elected to bat.; Points: Essex 19, Somerset 4.

14–17 April 2017	Lancashire	v	Surrey (H)	Match drawn
Scorecard	470 (138.5 overs); Shivnarine Chanderpaul 182 (328); Mark Footitt 5/118 (32 overs)		319 (125.2 overs); Rory Burns 91 (215); Stephen Parry 3/31 (24.2 overs)	The Oval, London; Umpires: Jeff Evans and David Millns
Scorecard			323/3d (92 overs) (f/o); Kumar Sangakkara 136 (190); Simon Kerrigan 2/101 (24 overs)	The Oval, London; Umpires: Jeff Evans and David Millns
Lancashire won the toss and elected to bat.; 11 overs were lost on Day 1. 15 overs were then lost on Day 4.; Points: Lancashire 11, Surrey 9.

14–17 April 2017	Warwickshire (H)	v	Yorkshire	Yorkshire won by an innings and 88 runs
Scorecard	178 (61.1 overs); Keith Barker 50 (88); Ben Coad 5/52 (22 overs)		381 (114.3 overs); Peter Handscomb 75 (110); Keith Barker 3/74 (27 overs)	Edgbaston, Birmingham; Umpires: Nigel Cowley and Tim Robinson
Scorecard	115 (42 overs); Jeetan Patel 49* (65); Ben Coad 5/50 (18 overs)			Edgbaston, Birmingham; Umpires: Nigel Cowley and Tim Robinson
No toss, Yorkshire elected to field.; 41.3 overs were lost on Day 1. 28 overs were then lost on Day 3.; Points: Yorkshire 23, Warwickshire 2.

21–24 April 2017	Hampshire (H)	v	Yorkshire	Match drawn
Scorecard	455 (144.4 overs); James Vince 147 (254); Ben Coad 4/71 (30 overs)		231 (77.2 overs); Gary Ballance 108 (198); Gareth Berg 4/62 (20 overs)	Rose Bowl, Southampton; Umpires: Billy Taylor and Alex Wharf
Scorecard			399/6d (132 overs) (f/o); Gary Ballance 203* (384); Kyle Abbott 3/65 (28 overs)	Rose Bowl, Southampton; Umpires: Billy Taylor and Alex Wharf
No toss, Yorkshire elected to field.; Points: Hampshire 11, Yorkshire 8.

21–24 April 2017	Lancashire (H)	v	Somerset	Lancashire won by 164 runs
Scorecard	109 (41.4 overs); Liam Livingstone 68 (102); Craig Overton 5/47 (13 overs)		278 (93 overs); Dean Elgar 113* (242); Ryan McLaren 4/76 (25 overs)	Old Trafford, Greater Manchester; Umpires: Rob Bailey and Mike Burns
Scorecard	463 (161 overs); Liam Livingstone 168 (306); Lewis Gregory 5/74 (32 overs)		130 (47.5 overs); James Hildreth 43 (74); Ryan McLaren 4/37 (11.5 overs)	Old Trafford, Greater Manchester; Umpires: Rob Bailey and Mike Burns
No toss, Somerset elected to field.; Points: Lancashire 19, Somerset 5.

21–24 April 2017	Middlesex (H)	v	Essex	Match drawn
Scorecard	507/7d (131 overs); Sam Robson 149 (208); Jamie Porter 2/90 (28 overs)		295 (95.1 overs); Dan Lawrence 75 (185); Steven Finn 4/51 (22.1 overs)	Lord's, London; Umpires: Paul Baldwin and Ian Gould
Scorecard	239/3d (36 overs); Sam Robson 77 (84); Simon Harmer 3/72 (11 overs)		160/8 (74 overs); Alastair Cook 37 (56); Toby Roland-Jones 3/42 (21 overs)	Lord's, London; Umpires: Paul Baldwin and Ian Gould
No toss, Essex elected to field.; 22.4 overs were lost on Day 1. 22 overs were then lost on Day 4.; Points: Middlesex 12, Essex 8.

21–24 April 2017	Warwickshire (H)	v	Surrey	Match drawn
Scorecard	332 (96.3 overs); Ian Westwood 153 (227); Tom Curran 4/98 (21.3 overs)		437 (119.3 overs); Mark Stoneman 123 (201); Jeetan Patel 3/74 (30.3 overs)	Edgbaston, Birmingham; Umpires: Russell Evans and Michael Gough
Scorecard	435/8d (123 overs); Ian Bell 99 (162); Tom Curran 4/112 (33 overs)			Edgbaston, Birmingham; Umpires: Russell Evans and Michael Gough
No toss, Surrey elected to field.; 24 overs were lost on Day 4.; Points: Surrey 13, Warwickshire 10.

==== May ====
19–21 May 2017	Essex (H)	v	Hampshire	Essex won by an innings and 97 runs
Scorecard	360 (132.4 overs); Alastair Cook 124 (281); Kyle Abbott 5/58 (30 overs)		115 (37.3 overs); Lewis McManus 39 (74); Jamie Porter 5/24 (14 overs)	County Ground, Chelmsford; Umpires: Steve Garratt and Tim Robinson
Scorecard			148 (47.3 overs) (f/o); Lewis McManus 37 (52); Simon Harmer 3/23 (5 overs)	County Ground, Chelmsford; Umpires: Steve Garratt and Tim Robinson
No toss, Hampshire elected to field.; 17 overs were lost on day one due to rain. 11 overs were then lost on day two due to rain.; Points: Essex 22, Hampshire 1.

19–22 May 2017	Yorkshire	v	Lancashire (H)	Match drawn
Scorecard	448/8d (147 overs); Jack Leaning 118 (290); Tom Bailey 4/116 (35 overs)		432 (129.4 overs); Shivnarine Chanderpaul 106 (199); Tim Bresnan 3/69 (18.4 overs)	Old Trafford, Greater Manchester; Umpires: Nick Cook and Jeremy Lloyds
Scorecard	177/1d (36 overs); Peter Handscomb 101* (77); Simon Kerrigan 1/65 (8 overs)			Old Trafford, Greater Manchester; Umpires: Nick Cook and Jeremy Lloyds
Yorkshire won the toss and elected to bat.; 53 overs were lost on day two due to rain.; Points: Lancashire 10, Yorkshire 9.

19–22 May 2017	Surrey	v	Middlesex (H)	Match drawn
Scorecard	313 (89.1 overs); Kumar Sangakkara 114 (160); James Franklin 4/40 (15 overs)		411 (107.4 overs); Dawid Malan 115 (214); Stuart Meaker 4/92 (23 overs)	Lord's, London; Umpires: Mike Burns and Peter Hartley
Scorecard	339 (126.2 overs); Kumar Sangakkara 120 (210); Toby Roland-Jones 4/76 (27 overs)		92/2 (28 overs); Dawid Malan 37* (44); Mark Footitt 1/10 (2 overs)	Lord's, London; Umpires: Mike Burns and Peter Hartley
Middlesex won the toss and elected to field.; 24 overs were lost on day one due to rain.; Points: Middlesex 13, Surrey 11.

19–22 May 2017	Warwickshire	v	Somerset (H)	Match drawn
Scorecard	413 (113.4 overs); Jonathan Trott 175 (297); Jamie Overton 3/76 (21 overs)		230 (78.3 overs); Marcus Trescothick 106 (199); Grant Thornton 4/34 (12.2 overs)	County Ground, Taunton; Umpires: Paul Baldwin and Alex Wharf
Scorecard			86/1 (25.1 overs) (f/o); Marcus Trescothick 46* (86); Sukhjit Singh 1/29 (8 overs)	County Ground, Taunton; Umpires: Paul Baldwin and Alex Wharf
Warwickshire won the toss and elected to bat.; 63.1 overs were lost on day one due to rain. Only 6.1 overs were then possible on day two due to rain.; Grant Thornton (Warwickshire) made his first-class debut.; Points: Warwickshire 12, Somerset 8.

26–29 May 2017	Surrey	v	Essex (H)	Match drawn
Scorecard	369 (109.2 overs); Kumar Sangakkara 200 (321); Jamie Porter 4/89 (27 overs)		383 (132.1 overs); Dan Lawrence 107 (208); Stuart Meaker 3/73 (17.1 overs)	County Ground, Chelmsford; Umpires: Jeremy Lloyds and Neil Mallender
Scorecard	260/9d (76 overs); Kumar Sangakkara 84 (107); Jamie Porter 5/71 (18 overs)			County Ground, Chelmsford; Umpires: Jeremy Lloyds and Neil Mallender
Surrey won the toss and elected to bat.; Amar Virdi (Surrey) made his first-class debut.; Points: Essex 11, Surrey 11.

26–29 May 2017	Hampshire	v	Somerset (H)	Hampshire won by 90 runs
Scorecard	162 (49.1 overs); Kyle Abbott 49 (54); Jack Leach 6/78 (20.1 overs)		197 (57.3 overs); Dean Elgar 60 (91); Kyle Abbott 4/49 (14 overs)	County Ground, Taunton; Umpires: Nick Cook and Graham Lloyd
Scorecard	293 (67.3 overs); Michael Carberry 51 (78); Dominic Bess 7/117 (23.3 overs)		168 (54.2 overs); Dean Elgar 60 (100); Mason Crane 5/40 (13.2 overs)	County Ground, Taunton; Umpires: Nick Cook and Graham Lloyd
Hampshire won the toss and elected to bat.; Points: Hampshire 19, Somerset 3.

==== June ====
2–5 June 2017	Hampshire (H)	v	Warwickshire	Hampshire won by an innings and 94 runs
Scorecard	515 (161.5 overs); Sean Ervine 203 (363); Sukhjit Singh 6/144 (50 overs)		254 (102.1 overs); Jonathan Trott 101 (213); Mason Crane 3/104 (36 overs)	The Rose Bowl, Southampton; Umpires: Nigel Cowley and Peter Hartley
Scorecard			167 (64.4 overs) (f/o); Ian Bell 68 (76); Kyle Abbott 4/32 (7 overs)	The Rose Bowl, Southampton; Umpires: Nigel Cowley and Peter Hartley
Hampshire won the toss and elected to bat.; Points: Hampshire 22, Warwickshire 3.

2–5 June 2017	Somerset	v	Middlesex (H)	Match drawn
Scorecard	443/9d (128.1 overs); Dean Elgar 158 (298); James Franklin 2/34 (16 overs)		358 (124.5 overs); Adam Voges 86 (173); Lewis Gregory 3/59 (16.5 overs)	Lord's, London; Umpires: Jeremy Lloyds and Billy Taylor
Scorecard	161/3d (45 overs); Tom Abell 71* (142); Paul Stirling 1/25 (6 overs)			Lord's, London; Umpires: Jeremy Lloyds and Billy Taylor
Somerset won the toss and elected to bat.; Points: Somerset 11, Middlesex 10.

2–5 June 2017	Lancashire	v	Yorkshire (H)	Yorkshire won by 10 wickets
Scorecard	123 (43.4 overs); Ryan McLaren 30 (39); Ben Coad 6/25 (11.4 overs)		273 (82 overs); Adam Lyth 100 (234); Jordan Clark 3/44 (12 overs)	Headingley, Leeds; Umpires: Rob Bailey and Michael Gough
Scorecard	209 (69 overs); Shivnarine Chanderpaul 47 (80); Ryan Sidebottom 3/38 (19 overs)		61/0 (20.5 overs); Adam Lyth 28* (72)	Headingley, Leeds; Umpires: Rob Bailey and Michael Gough
Lancashire won the toss and elected to bat.; Points: Yorkshire 21, Lancashire 3.

9–12 June 2017	Middlesex	v	Lancashire (H)	Lancashire won by 8 wickets
Scorecard	180 (51 overs); John Simpson 53 (82); Jordan Clark 3/36 (10 overs)		309 (95.3 overs); Ryan McLaren 75 (137); Tim Murtagh 6/63 (28 overs)	Trafalgar Road Ground, Southport; Umpires: Peter Hartley and Steve O'Shaughnessy
Scorecard	236 (71.3 overs); Dawid Malan 52 (121); Stephen Parry 5/45 (21.3 overs)		111/2 (30.2 overs); Haseeb Hameed 38* (81); Toby Roland-Jones 2/34 (8 overs)	Trafalgar Road Ground, Southport; Umpires: Peter Hartley and Steve O'Shaughnessy
Middlesex won the toss and elected to bat.; Points: Lancashire 22, Middlesex 3.

9–12 June 2017	Somerset (H)	v	Yorkshire	Yorkshire won by 3 runs
Scorecard	224 (64 overs); Craig Overton 44 (64); Ryan Sidebottom 5/56 (17 overs)		202 (75 overs); Andy Hodd 59 (64); Jamie Overton 3/30(15 overs)	County Ground, Taunton; Umpires: Neil Bainton and David Millns
Scorecard	258 (85.3 overs); Adam Hose 68 (126); Steven Patterson 3/28 (14 overs)		283 (109.2 overs); Gary Ballance 98* (230); Dominic Bess 5/80 (36.2 overs)	County Ground, Taunton; Umpires: Neil Bainton and David Millns
Yorkshire won the toss and elected to bat.; Matthew Waite (Yorkshire) made his first-class debut.; Points: Yorkshire 20, Somerset 4.

9–12 June 2017	Surrey (H)	v	Essex	Essex won by 8 wickets
Scorecard	399 (96 overs); Mark Stoneman 197 (248); Jamie Porter 4/102 (24 overs)		435 (106 overs); Ryan Ten Doeschate 168* (209); Mark Footitt 3/96 (22 overs)	Woodbridge Road, Guildford; Umpires: Rob Bailey and Nick Cook
Scorecard	288 (92.4 overs); Ben Foakes 65 (149); Simon Harmer 4/83 (39 overs)		253/2 (64.2 overs); Tom Westley 107* (168); Ravi Rampaul 1/47 (13 overs)	Woodbridge Road, Guildford; Umpires: Rob Bailey and Nick Cook
No toss, Essex elected to field.; Points: Essex 24, Surrey 7.

19–22 June 2017	Essex (H)	v	Warwickshire	Essex won by an innings and 164 runs
Scorecard	541/9d (164 overs); Ravi Bopara 192 (379); Jeetan Patel 4/138 (45 overs)		283 (108.4 overs); Sam Hain 58 (127); Simon Harmer 6/92 (45.4 overs)	County Ground, Chelmsford; Umpires: Neil Bainton and Nigel Llong
Scorecard			94 (53.2 overs) (f/o); Andrew Umeed 21 (60); Simon Harmer 8/36 (20.2 overs)	County Ground, Chelmsford; Umpires: Neil Bainton and Nigel Llong
Essex won the toss and elected to bat.; Points: Essex 22, Warwickshire 3.

19–22 June 2017	Lancashire (H)	v	Hampshire	Lancashire won by an innings and 30 runs
Scorecard	395 (114.1 overs); George Bailey 127 (187); Luke Proctor 2/49 (14 overs)		593 (146.2 overs); Dane Vilas 244 (275); Gareth Berg 4/111 (38 overs)	Old Trafford, Manchester; Umpires: Paul Baldwin and Neil Mallender
Scorecard	168 (56.4 overs); Gareth Berg 49 (71); James Anderson 4/20 (15 overs)			Old Trafford, Manchester; Umpires: Paul Baldwin and Neil Mallender
Hampshire won the toss and elected to bat.; Points: Lancashire 24, Hampshire 5.

19–22 June 2017	Middlesex (H)	v	Yorkshire	Middlesex won by an innings and 64 runs
Scorecard	446 (132 overs); Sam Robson 159 (290); Ryan Sidebottom 3/69 (26 overs)		208 (63.2 overs); Gary Ballance 69* (123); Ryan Higgins 3/35 (16 overs)	Lord's, London; Umpires: Nick Cook and Jeff Evans
Scorecard			174 (62.3 overs) (f/o); Adil Rashid 35 (66); Ollie Rayner 4/35 (13.3 overs)	Lord's, London; Umpires: Nick Cook and Jeff Evans
Middlesex won the toss and elected to bat.; Ryan Higgins (Middlesex) made his first-class debut.; Points: Middlesex 23, Yorkshire 3

26–29 June 2017 (D/N)	Middlesex	v	Essex (H)	Essex won by an innings and 34 runs
Scorecard	246 (59.1 overs); Paul Stirling 77 (50); Simon Harmer 5/77 (20 overs)		542/3d (125 overs); Nick Browne 221 (384); Ollie Rayner 2/152 (29 overs)	County Ground, Chelmsford; Umpires: Peter Hartley and David Millns
Scorecard	262 (111.4 overs); Nick Compton 120 (303); Simon Harmer 9/95 (46.4 overs)			County Ground, Chelmsford; Umpires: Peter Hartley and David Millns
Middlesex won the toss and elected to bat.; Points: Essex 24, Middlesex 1.

26–29 June 2017 (D/N)	Hampshire (H)	v	Somerset	Match drawn
Scorecard	211/9d (88 overs); Liam Dawson 53 (139); Lewis Gregory 3/51 (17 overs)		147 (52.2 overs); Adam Hose 48 (98); Ian Holland 4/16 (6 overs)	The Rose Bowl, Southampton; Umpires: Ian Blackwell and Martin Saggers
Scorecard	96/5d (39 overs); Rilee Rossouw 22 (37); Lewis Gregory 2/34 (10 overs)		88/8 (31 overs); Steven Davies 47 (40); Gareth Berg 3/17 (9 overs)	The Rose Bowl, Southampton; Umpires: Ian Blackwell and Martin Saggers
Hampshire won the toss and elected to bat.; Eddie Byrom (Somerset) made his first-class debut.; Points: Hampshire 9, Somerset 8.

26–29 June 2017 (D/N)	Lancashire	v	Warwickshire (H)	Match drawn
Scorecard	273 (80.3 overs); Shivnarine Chanderpaul 117* (151); George Panayi 3/41 (14.3 overs)		321 (132.5 overs); Andrew Umeed 113 (392); Jordan Clark 4/81 (22.5 overs)	Edgbaston, Birmingham; Umpires: Nick Cook and Jeremy Lloyds
Scorecard	178/4 (70 overs); Alex Davies 79 (130); Boyd Rankin 2/35 (13 overs)			Edgbaston, Birmingham; Umpires: Nick Cook and Jeremy Lloyds
Lancashire won the toss and elected to bat.; George Panayi (Warwickshire) made his first-class debut.; Points: Warwickshire 10, Lancashire 9

26–29 June 2017 (D/N)	Surrey	v	Yorkshire (H)	Match drawn
Scorecard	516/7d (115.1 overs); Kumar Sangakkara 180* (183); Steven Patterson 2/73 (26 overs)		27/1 (10.5 overs); Joe Root 12* (13); Sam Curran 1/6 (5 overs)	Headingley, Leeds; Umpires: Richard Kettleborough and Neil Mallender
Surrey won the toss and elected to bat.; Only 30 overs were possible on day two due to rain. No play was then possible on day three and day four.; Points: Surrey 10, Yorkshire 7.

==== July ====
3–6 July 2017	Hampshire	v	Surrey (H)	Match drawn
Scorecard	648/7d (161.4 overs); Jimmy Adams 144 (262); Tom Curran 2/85 (25 overs)		483 (147.5 overs); Rory Burns 219* (423); Ian Holland 3/37 (16.5 overs)	Kennington Oval, London; Umpires: Nick Cook and Alex Wharf
Scorecard			166/3d (52 overs) (f/o); Rory Burns 68 (112); Ian Holland 2/16 (7 overs)	Kennington Oval, London; Umpires: Nick Cook and Alex Wharf
Hampshire won the toss and elected to bat.; 14 overs were lost on Day 4.; Points: Hampshire 12, Surrey 10.

3–6 July 2017	Warwickshire (H)	v	Middlesex	Middlesex won by 1 wicket
Scorecard	334 (105 overs); Rikki Clarke 83 (139); Tim Murtagh 3/85 (28 overs)		334 (94 overs); Stevie Eskinazi 179 (243); Rikki Clarke 3/61 (23 overs)	Edgbaston, Birmingham; Umpires: Graham Lloyd and Neil Mallender
Scorecard	233 (69.4 overs); Jonathan Trott 99 (199); Tom Helm 5/59 (15.4 overs)		234/9 (71.1 overs); Nick Compton 49 (99); Keith Barker 2/39 (16 overs)	Edgbaston, Birmingham; Umpires: Graham Lloyd and Neil Mallender
No toss, Middlesex elected to field.; Points: Middlesex 22, Warwickshire 6.

3–6 July 2017	Somerset	v	Yorkshire (H)	Somerset won by 179 runs
Scorecard	268 (75.2 overs); Adam Hose 62 (128); Liam Plunkett 4/73 (21 overs)		213 (76.3 overs); Adil Rashid 49 (102); Craig Overton 5/87 (24 overs)	North Marine Road Ground, Scarborough; Umpires: Steve O'Shaughnessy and Tim Robinson
Scorecard	281/4d (73 overs); James Hildreth 101* (120); Ben Coad 2/62 (20 overs)		157 (38.3 overs); Liam Plunkett 39 (34); Craig Overton 4/47 (14 overs)	North Marine Road Ground, Scarborough; Umpires: Steve O'Shaughnessy and Tim Robinson
Somerset won the toss and elected to bat.; Only 44 overs were possible on Day 2.; Points: Somerset 21, Yorkshire 4.

==== August ====
6–9 August 2017	Lancashire	v	Hampshire (H)	Match drawn
Scorecard	149 (57.5 overs); Alex Davies 36 (73); Mason Crane 3/27 (5.5 overs)		224 (57.4 overs); Liam Dawson 75 (98); Kyle Jarvis 6/61 (18 overs)	The Rose Bowl, Southampton; Umpires: Stephen Gale and Jeremy Lloyds
Scorecard	314/5 (76 overs); Alex Davies 97 (92); Liam Dawson 2/62 (22 overs)			The Rose Bowl, Southampton; Umpires: Stephen Gale and Jeremy Lloyds
Lancashire won the toss and elected to bat.; No play was possible on Day 3 and 4.; Points: Hampshire 9, Lancashire 8

6–9 August 2017	Warwickshire	v	Middlesex (H)	Warwickshire won by 190 runs
Scorecard	126 (47 overs); Jeetan Patel 24 (34); Steven Finn 4/53 (12 overs)		161 (40.2 overs); James Franklin 55 (76); Ryan Sidebottom 4/29 (10 overs)	Lord's, London; Umpires: Paul Baldwin and Tim Robinson
Scorecard	361 (112.1 overs); Matthew Lamb 71 (165); Ryan Higgins 4/75 (24 overs)		136 (29.5 overs); Nathan Sowter 37 (23); Keith Barker 3/21 (8 overs)	Lord's, London; Umpires: Paul Baldwin and Tim Robinson
Warwickshire won the toss and elected to bat.; Nathan Sowter (Middlesex) made his first-class debut.; Points: Warwickshire 19, Middlesex 3

6–9 August 2017	Yorkshire (H)	v	Essex	Essex won by 8 wickets
Scorecard	113 (35.2 overs); Adam Lyth 68 (93); Mohammad Amir 5/18 (11.2 overs)		231 (69 overs); Ryan ten Doeschate 88 (130); Ben Coad 3/36 (15 overs)	North Marine Road Ground, Scarborough; Umpires: Rob Bailey and Billy Taylor
Scorecard	150 (49.4 overs); Jack Leaning 70 (131); Mohammad Amir 5/54 (17 overs)		34/2 (10 overs); Varun Chopra 13 (25); Jack Brooks 1/26 (5 overs)	North Marine Road Ground, Scarborough; Umpires: Rob Bailey and Billy Taylor
No toss, Essex elected to field.; Points: Essex 20, Yorkshire 3

7–10 August 2017	Somerset (H)	v	Surrey	Match drawn
Scorecard	436 (112.1 overs); Steven Davies 142 (199); Rikki Clarke 3/83 (24 overs)		345 (108.4 overs); Mark Stoneman 67 (127); Dominic Bess 5/101 (29.4 overs)	County Ground, Taunton; Umpires: Nick Cook and Nigel Cowley
No toss, Surrey elected to field.; 26 overs were lost on Day 1. 14 overs were then lost on Day 2. No play was then possible on Day 3.; Points: Somerset 13, Surrey 11

28–31 August 2017	Essex (H)	v	Somerset	Essex won by 179 runs
Scorecard	159 (50.2 overs); Nick Browne 44 (94); Craig Overton 4/40 (15.2 overs)		164 (64 overs); James Hildreth 51 (70); Jamie Porter 5/40 (17 overs)	County Ground, Chelmsford; Umpires: Mike Burns and Neil Mallender
Scorecard	293 (100.1 overs); Adam Wheater 88 (188); Craig Overton 3/68 (25 overs)		109 (37.5 overs); Craig Overton 36 (73); Jamie Porter 7/55 (14 overs)	County Ground, Chelmsford; Umpires: Mike Burns and Neil Mallender
Essex won the toss and elected to bat.; 14.3 overs were lost on Day 2. Only 13.3 overs were possible on Day 3.; Points: Essex 19, Somerset 3

28–31 August 2017	Warwickshire	v	Lancashire (H)	Lancashire won by 8 wickets
Scorecard	200 (62.2 overs); Jeetan Patel 47 (52); Kyle Jarvis 6/67 (18.2 overs)		504/8d (125 overs); Liam Livingstone 224 (325); Ryan Sidebottom 3/71 (18 overs)	Old Trafford, Manchester; Umpires: Russell Evans and David Millns
Scorecard	344 (104 overs); Tim Ambrose 104 (198); Ryan McLaren 3/80 (25 overs)		42/2 (7.2 overs); Haseeb Hameed 21 (24); Keith Barker 2/18 (4 overs)	Old Trafford, Manchester; Umpires: Russell Evans and David Millns
Warwickshire won the toss and elected to bat.; Points: Lancashire 24, Warwickshire 2

28–31 August 2017	Middlesex	v	Surrey (H)	Match drawn
Scorecard	247 (84.2 overs); Sam Robson 57 (176); Stuart Meaker 3/55 (14 overs)		280 (87.4 overs); Jason Roy 79 (144); Toby Roland-Jones 4/66 (22.4 overs)	Kennington Oval, London; Umpires: Paul Baldwin and Michael Gough
Scorecard	214/7 (68.1 overs); John Simpson 88* (217); Sam Curran 3/76 (18 overs)			Kennington Oval, London; Umpires: Paul Baldwin and Michael Gough
Middlesex won the toss and elected to bat.; No play was possible on Day 3.; Match was stopped and declared drawn on Day 4 (after 62.1 overs) due to a foreign object being fired onto the field.; Ryan Patel (Surrey) made his first-class debut.; Points: Surrey 10, Middlesex 9; Middlesex was deducted 2 points for a slow over rate.

==== September ====
5–8 September 2017	Surrey	v	Hampshire (H)	Match drawn
Scorecard	200 (65.4 overs); Ryan Patel 81 (163); Liam Dawson 4/22 (15.4 overs)		290 (88.5 overs); Gareth Berg 80 (116); Tom Curran 4/69 (19.5 overs)	The Rose Bowl, Southampton; Umpires: Mike Burns and David Millns
Scorecard	280/4 (88.5 overs); Ollie Pope 100* (137); Liam Dawson 2/35 (27 overs)			The Rose Bowl, Southampton; Umpires: Mike Burns and David Millns
Hampshire won the toss and elected to field.; Only 5 overs were possible on Day 1. Only 32.5 overs were possible on Day 4.; Points: Hampshire 10, Surrey 9

5–8 September 2017	Lancashire (H)	v	Essex	Match drawn
Scorecard	290 (95.2 overs); Haseeb Hameed 88 (250); Jamie Porter 5/73 (24 overs)		202/8d (80 overs); Varun Chopra 40 (108); Ryan McLaren 4/45 (20 overs)	Old Trafford, Manchester; Umpires: Steve O'Shaughnessy and Alex Wharf
No toss, Essex elected to field.; No play was possible on Day 1.25 overs were then lost on Day 3. Only 32 overs were then possible on Day 4.; Points: Lancashire 9, Essex 9

5–8 September 2017	Somerset	v	Warwickshire (H)	Somerset won by 169 runs
Scorecard	282 (81 overs); Tom Abell 82 (144); Sukhjit Singh 5/72 (19 overs)		146 (61.3 overs); Keith Barker 52 (119); Jack Leach 5/50 (27.3 overs)	Edgbaston, Birmingham; Umpires: Rob Bailey and Peter Hartley
Scorecard	265/4d (63 overs); Marcus Trescothick 119* (205); Ryan Sidebottom 3/69 (16 overs)		232 (88.3 overs); Jonathan Trott 74 (158); Tim Groenewald 5/58 (18 overs)	Edgbaston, Birmingham; Umpires: Rob Bailey and Peter Hartley
Somerset won the toss and elected to bat.; 33.3 overs were lost on Day 1.; George Bartlett (Somerset) made his first-class debut.; Points: Somerset 21, Warwickshire 3

5–8 September 2017	Yorkshire (H)	v	Middlesex	Match drawn
Scorecard	358 (111.2 overs); Jack Leaning 85 (142); Tim Murtagh 4/77 (29 overs)		272/8d (66.5 overs); Adam Voges 65* (106); Ryan Sidebottom 3/62 (20 overs)	Headingley, Leeds; Umpires: Richard Illingworth and Jeremy Lloyds
No toss, Middlesex elected to field.; No play was possible on Day 1. 42 overs were lost on Day 3. Only 34.5 overs were possible on Day 4.; Points: Yorkshire 11, Middlesex 10.

12–15 September 2017	Middlesex (H)	v	Hampshire	Match drawn
Scorecard	204 (72 overs); John Simpson 36 (67); Fidel Edwards 5/79 (26 overs)		146 (36.1 overs); Joe Weatherley 35 (38); Steven Finn 3/41 (10.1 overs)	Uxbridge Cricket Club Ground; Umpires: Russell Evans and Graham Lloyd
Scorecard	14/1 (9 overs); Nick Compton 11* (28); Gareth Berg 1/9 (5 overs)			Uxbridge Cricket Club Ground; Umpires: Russell Evans and Graham Lloyd
No toss, Hampshire elected to field.; No play was possible on Day 1. Only 30.1 overs were possible on Day 2. Only 29 overs were possible on Day 3. 29 overs were lost on Day 4.; Felix Organ (Hampshire) made his first-class debut.; Points: Middlesex 9, Hampshire 8.

12–15 September 2017	Somerset (H)	v	Lancashire	Somerset won by 7 wickets
Scorecard	335 (97.2 overs); Steven Davies 111 (174); Matt Parkinson 4/68 (17 overs)		133 (57.3 overs); Steven Croft 41 (52); Jack Leach 5/47 (22.3 overs)	County Ground, Taunton, Taunton; Umpires: Nick Cook and Billy Taylor
Scorecard	69/3 (13.3 overs); George Bartlett 27* (31); Matt Parkinson 3/37 (5 overs)		269 (127 overs) (f/o); Haseeb Hameed 62 (188); Jack Leach 4/94 (51 overs)	County Ground, Taunton, Taunton; Umpires: Nick Cook and Billy Taylor
No toss, Lancashire elected to field.; 14 overs were lost on Day 2.; Points: Somerset 22, Lancashire 3

12–15 September 2017	Surrey (H)	v	Yorkshire	Match drawn
Scorecard	592 (137.2 overs); Kumar Sangakkara 164 (187); Jack Brooks 5/113 (28 overs)		394 (122.2 overs); Shaun Marsh 78 (145); Gareth Batty 3/77 (28.2 overs)	Kennington Oval, London; Umpires: Mike Burns and Neil Mallender
Scorecard			281/2 (88 overs) (f/o); Shaun Marsh 125* (263); Sam Curran 1/57 (16 overs)	Kennington Oval, London; Umpires: Mike Burns and Neil Mallender
Surrey won the toss and elected to bat.; 25 overs were lost on Day 4.; Points: Surrey 12, Yorkshire 10

12–15 September 2017	Warwickshire (H)	v	Essex	Essex won by an innings and 56 runs
Scorecard	201 (66.5 overs); Dominic Sibley 76 (183); Simon Harmer 4/47 (22 overs)		369/9d (115 overs); Varun Chopra 98 (181); Keith Barker 3/71 (22 overs)	Edgbaston, Birmingham; Umpires: Steve O'Shaughnessy and Martin Saggers
Scorecard	112 (46 overs); Matthew Lamb 35 (66); Simon Harmer 4/25 (16 overs)			Edgbaston, Birmingham; Umpires: Steve O'Shaughnessy and Martin Saggers
No toss, Essex elected to field.; Henry Brookes (Warwickshire) made his first-class debut.; Points: Essex 23, Warwickshire 3

19–22 September 2017	Hampshire (H)	v	Essex	Essex won by 108 runs
Scorecard	254 (67.5 overs); George Bailey 89 (130); Jamie Porter 4/53 (17 overs)		76 (35.2 overs); Ryan ten Doeschate 26 (36); Kyle Abbott 6/20 (11 overs)	The Rose Bowl, Southampton; Umpires: Nigel Llong and Alex Wharf
Scorecard	76 (29.4 overs); Ian Holland 16* (46); Sam Cook 5/18 (11.4 overs)		362 (123 overs) (f/o); Dan Lawrence 101 (209); Fidel Edwards 3/73 (26 overs)	The Rose Bowl, Southampton; Umpires: Nigel Llong and Alex Wharf
No toss, Essex elected to field.; Only 20 overs were possible on Day 3.; Points: Essex 19, Hampshire 5

19–22 September 2017	Middlesex (H)	v	Lancashire	Middlesex won by 36 runs
Scorecard	233 (61.4 overs); Toby Roland-Jones 53 (72); Tom Bailey 5/54 (18 overs)		165 (55.3 overs); Steven Croft 37 (65); Tim Murtagh 4/49 (18 overs)	Lord's, London; Umpires: Neil Mallender and Martin Saggers
Scorecard	152 (45.2 overs); Sam Robson 58 (96); Tom Bailey 5/44 (16 overs)		184 (65.4 overs); Dane Vilas 37 (51); Steven Finn 8/79 (22.4 overs)	Lord's, London; Umpires: Neil Mallender and Martin Saggers
Middlesex won the toss and elected to bat.; Points: Middlesex 20, Lancashire 3.

19–22 September 2017	Somerset	v	Surrey (H)	Surrey won by 6 wickets
Scorecard	269 (80 overs); Steven Davies 86 (119); Rikki Clarke 7/55 (18 overs)		433 (129.4 overs); Kumar Sangakkara 157 (238); Peter Trego 5/67 (28.4 overs)	Kennington Oval, London; Umpires: Ian Gould and Steve O'Shaughnessy
Scorecard	306 (91.2 overs); Peter Trego 68 (83); Stuart Meaker 3/65 (18 overs)		146/4 (32.4 overs); Ben Foakes 42* (44); Dominic Bess 2/47 (10.4 overs)	Kennington Oval, London; Umpires: Ian Gould and Steve O'Shaughnessy
Somerset won the toss and elected to bat.; 23 overs were lost on Day 3.; Points: Surrey 23, Somerset 4

19–22 September 2017	Warwickshire	v	Yorkshire (H)	Yorkshire won by 2 wickets
Scorecard	219 (70.1 overs); Jeetan Patel 100 (112); Matthew Fisher 5/54 (15.1 overs)		296 (96.1 overs); Adam Lyth 62 (136); Boyd Rankin 3/48 (13.1 overs)	Headingley, Leeds; Umpires: Mike Burns and Richard Kettleborough
Scorecard	251 (87.4 overs); Jonathan Trott 59 (97); Steven Patterson 4/46 (26 overs)		178/8 (64.2 overs); Steven Patterson 44* (78); Jeetan Patel 6/50 (28 overs)	Headingley, Leeds; Umpires: Mike Burns and Richard Kettleborough
Warwickshire won the toss and elected to bat.; Liam Banks (Warwickshire) made his first-class debut.; Points: Yorkshire 21, Warwickshire 4

25–28 September 2017	Essex (H)	v	Yorkshire	Essex won by 376 runs
Scorecard	227 (71.2 overs); Simon Harmer 64 (76); Jack Brooks 3/54 (17 overs)		111 (45.1 overs); Adam Lyth 35 (53); Neil Wagner 3/21 (9 overs)	County Ground, Chelmsford; Umpires: Russell Evans and Graham Lloyd
Scorecard	334/7d (95.2 overs); Dan Lawrence 83 (156); Matthew Fisher 3/69 (20.2 overs)		74 (28.5 overs); Matthew Fisher 25 (48); Sam Cook 5/20 (8 overs)	County Ground, Chelmsford; Umpires: Russell Evans and Graham Lloyd
No toss, Yorkshire elected to field.; 16 overs were lost on Day 1.; Seventh ball was played on the 87th over of Essex 2nd innings.; Points: Essex 20, Yorkshire 3

25–28 September 2017	Surrey	v	Lancashire (H)	Lancashire won by 7 wickets
Scorecard	201/8d (73.3 overs); Sam Curran 56* (109); Saqib Mahmood 4/50 (17.3 overs)		268 (92.3 overs); Steven Croft 115 (173); Rikki Clarke 3/29 (16 overs)	Old Trafford, Manchester; Umpires: Peter Hartley and Neil Mallender
Scorecard	242 (64.5 overs); Mark Stoneman 98 (113); Liam Livingstone 6/52 (18 overs)		179/3 (38.5 overs); Liam Livingstone 69* (86); Rikki Clarke 2/50 (13 overs)	Old Trafford, Manchester; Umpires: Peter Hartley and Neil Mallender
Lancashire won the toss and elected to field.; Points: Lancashire 20, Surrey 4

25–28 September 2017	Somerset (H)	v	Middlesex	Somerset won by 231 runs
Scorecard	236 (84.4 overs); Eddie Byrom 56 (90); Ravi Patel 7/81 (29.4 overs)		142 (50.3 overs); Paul Stirling 41 (64); Jack Leach 4/54 (25 overs)	County Ground, Taunton; Umpires: Mike Burns and Alex Wharf
Scorecard	250/9d (78 overs); James Hildreth 109 (192); Ravi Patel 5/92 (26 overs)		113 (53.5 overs); John Simpson 19 (54); Jack Leach 5/57 (26.5 overs)	County Ground, Taunton; Umpires: Mike Burns and Alex Wharf
Somerset won the toss and elected to bat.; Only 39.1 overs were possible on Day 3.; Points: Somerset 20, Middlesex 3

25–28 September 2017	Warwickshire (H)	v	Hampshire	Match drawn
Scorecard	188 (61 overs); Dominic Sibley 92* (168); Fidel Edwards 5/49 (14 overs)		116 (34.2 overs); George Bailey 55 (57); Oliver Hannon-Dalby 4/29 (12 overs)	Edgbaston, Birmingham; Umpires: Jeff Evans and Russell Warren
Scorecard	186 (49.5 overs); Ian Bell 77* (101); Gareth Berg 3/40 (9 overs)		195/7 (87.4 overs); Gareth Berg 34 (66); Ryan Sidebottom 3/55 (19 overs)	Edgbaston, Birmingham; Umpires: Jeff Evans and Russell Warren
No toss, Hampshire elected to field.; No play was possible on Day 1. 31 overs were lost on Day 3. 10.2 overs were lost on Day 4.; Points: Warwickshire 8, Hampshire 8

=== Division Two ===
==== April ====
7–9 April 2017	Kent (H)	v	Gloucestershire	Kent won by 334 runs
Scorecard	298 (89 overs); Joe Denly 62 (106); Liam Norwell 3/46 (18 overs)		149 (59.3 overs); Chris Dent 67 (145); Mitchell Claydon 4/35 (12 overs)	St Lawrence Ground, Canterbury; Umpires: Rob Bailey and Paul Baldwin
Scorecard	246 (75.1 overs); Joe Denly 59 (110); Liam Norwell 5/59 (16 overs)		61 (20.4 overs); Liam Norwell 24 (34); Darren Stevens 6/22 (9 overs)	St Lawrence Ground, Canterbury; Umpires: Rob Bailey and Paul Baldwin
No toss, Gloucestershire elected to field.; Points: Kent 21, Gloucestershire 3.

7–9 April 2017	Leicestershire (H)	v	Nottinghamshire	Nottinghamshire won by 10 wickets
Scorecard	251 (74.1 overs); Mark Cosgrove 57 (91); Stuart Broad 3/45 (15 overs)		329 (89.3 overs); James Pattinson 89* (108); Ben Raine 6/66 (21.3 overs)	Grace Road, Leicester; Umpires: Nigel Cowley and Stephen Gale
Scorecard	81 (31.3 overs); Mark Cosgrove 21 (58); James Pattinson 5/29 (12.3 overs)		9/0 (1.4 overs); Greg Smith 8* (7)	Grace Road, Leicester; Umpires: Nigel Cowley and Stephen Gale
No toss, Nottinghamshire elected to field.; Points: Nottinghamshire 22, Leicestershire 5.

7–8 April 2017	Glamorgan	v	Northamptonshire (H)	Northamptonshire won by an innings and 22 runs
Scorecard	101 (31.3 overs); Aneurin Donald 34 (53); Ben Sanderson 3/20 (11.3 overs)		310 (78.1 overs); Rory Kleinveldt 86 (58); Lukas Carey 4/85 (23 overs)	County Ground, Northampton; Umpires: Steve Garratt and Tim Robinson
Scorecard	187 (65.3 overs); Colin Ingram 47 (107); Ben Sanderson 4/31 (19 overs)			County Ground, Northampton; Umpires: Steve Garratt and Tim Robinson
Glamorgan won the toss and elected to bat.; Points: Northamptonshire 22, Glamorgan 3.

14–17 April 2017	Derbyshire (H)	v	Northamptonshire	Northamptonshire won by 3 wickets
Scorecard	281 (88.1 overs); Gary Wilson 72 (104); Nathan Buck 5/68 (24.1 overs)		307 (82.4 overs); Max Holden 76 (108); Will Davis 4/60 (17 overs)	County Ground, Derby; Umpires: Paul Baldwin and Martin Saggers
Scorecard	351/1d (82.2 overs); Luis Reece 168 (246); Rob Newton 1/82 (9 overs)		330/7 (64.5 overs); Richard Levi 99 (79); Jeevan Mendis 3/84 (19 overs)	County Ground, Derby; Umpires: Paul Baldwin and Martin Saggers
No toss, Northamptonshire elected to field first.; Points: Northamptonshire 22, Derbyshire 5.

14–17 April 2017	Durham (H)	v	Nottinghamshire	Nottinghamshire won by 9 wickets
Scorecard	162 (45.4 overs); Stuart Poynter 65 (59); Luke Fletcher 3/23 (7.4 overs)		305 (84.3 overs); Luke Fletcher 92 (153); Chris Rushworth 4/54 (23.3 overs)	Riverside Ground, Chester-le-Street; Umpires: Peter Hartley and Alex Wharf
Scorecard	250 (73.5 overs); Keaton Jennings 102* (207); Jake Ball 3/80 (22 overs)		110/1 (26.2 overs); Greg Smith 60* (72); Paul Coughlin 1/26 (4.2 overs)	Riverside Ground, Chester-le-Street; Umpires: Peter Hartley and Alex Wharf
No toss, Nottinghamshire elected to field first.; Points: Nottinghamshire 22, Durham 3.

14–16 April 2017	Glamorgan (H)	v	Worcestershire	Worcestershire won by 8 wickets
Scorecard	207 (40.4 overs); David Lloyd 88 (103); John Hastings 3/57 (11 overs)		403 (94.1 overs); Tom Kohler-Cadmore 102 (159); Michael Hogan 3/78 (25 overs)	Sophia Gardens, Cardiff; Umpires: Neil Bainton and Steve O'Shaughnessy
Scorecard	223 (62.5 overs); Aneurin Donald 57 (65); Josh Tongue 5/45 (10 overs)		28/2 (5.3 overs); Tom Fell 15* (11); Lukas Carey 1/13 (2.3 overs)	Sophia Gardens, Cardiff; Umpires: Neil Bainton and Steve O'Shaughnessy
No toss, Worcestershire elected to field first.; Points: Worcestershire 24, Glamorgan 4.

14–16 April 2017	Gloucestershire (H)	v	Leicestershire	Gloucestershire won by an innings and 6 runs
Scorecard	466/8d (143 overs); William Tavaré 101 (277); Gavin Griffiths 4/101 (34 overs)		259 (73.2 overs); Ned Eckersley 88 (103); Liam Norwell 5/66 (21.2 overs)	County Ground, Bristol; Umpires: Steve Garratt and Neil Mallender
Scorecard			201 (43.4 overs) (f/o); Ned Eckersley 85 (96); Liam Norwell 5/33 (11.4 overs)	County Ground, Bristol; Umpires: Steve Garratt and Neil Mallender
No toss, Leicestershire elected to field first.; Points: Gloucestershire 22, Leicestershire 3.

14–17 April 2017	Kent	v	Sussex (H)	Kent won by 226 runs
Scorecard	304 (87.3 overs); Darren Stevens 68 (83); Jofra Archer 7/67 (23.3 overs)		291 (76.5 overs); Ben Brown 90 (116); Mitchell Claydon 4/87 (16 overs)	County Ground, Hove; Umpires: Mike Burns and Russell Evans
Scorecard	413/5d (97 overs); Sam Northeast 173* (181); Ajmal Shahzad 3/96 (27 overs)		200 (50.1 overs); Ben Brown 69* (67); Darren Stevens 5/51 (15 overs)	County Ground, Hove; Umpires: Mike Burns and Russell Evans
Kent won the toss and elected to bat.; Delray Rawlins (Sussex) made his first-class debut.; Points: Kent 22, Sussex 5.

21–24 April 2017	Gloucestershire (H)	v	Durham	Match drawn
Scorecard	303 (90.2 overs); William Tavaré 61 (158); Chris Rushworth 3/55 (23 overs)		419 (132.3 overs); Paul Collingwood 97 (178); Craig Miles 5/99 (28 overs)	County Ground, Bristol; Umpires: Stephen Gale and Jeremy Lloyds
Scorecard	320 (113.4 overs); Chris Dent 101 (258); Graham Onions 4/68 (28.4 overs)		85/4 (23 overs); Keaton Jennings 30* (56); David Payne 2/13 (5 overs)	County Ground, Bristol; Umpires: Stephen Gale and Jeremy Lloyds
No toss, Durham elected to field.; Points: Durham 12, Gloucestershire 9.

21–23 April 2017	Kent (H)	v	Derbyshire	Kent won by 169 runs
Scorecard	259 (84.5 overs); Wayne Parnell 41 (65); Will Davis 4/75 (20.5 overs)		159 (43.2 overs); Wayne Madsen 56 (95); Darren Stevens 6/47 (17 overs)	St Lawrence Ground, Canterbury; Umpires: Neil Bainton and Tim Robinson
Scorecard	308 (72.4 overs); Adam Rouse 95* (121); Will Davis 3/48 (17 overs)		239 (61.2 overs); Gary Wilson 97 (107); James Harris 4/56 (13 overs)	St Lawrence Ground, Canterbury; Umpires: Neil Bainton and Tim Robinson
No toss, Derbyshire elected to field.; Points: Kent 21, Derbyshire 3.

21–24 April 2017	Leicestershire (H)	v	Glamorgan	Match drawn
Scorecard	420 (115.1 overs); Harry Dearden 87 (211); Lukas Carey 4/127 (31 overs)		426 (108.5 overs); Colin Ingram 137 (230); Ben Raine 4/105 (30.5 overs)	Grace Road, Leicester; Umpires: Nick Cook and Graham Lloyd
Scorecard	360/6d (88 overs); Mark Pettini 110* (169); Marchant de Lange 3/77 (19 overs)		144/4 (46 overs); Aneurin Donald 66* (103); Ben Raine 2/23 (7 overs)	Grace Road, Leicester; Umpires: Nick Cook and Graham Lloyd
No toss, Glamorgan elected to field.; Points: Glamorgan 13, Leicestershire 12.

21–22 April 2017	Nottinghamshire (H)	v	Sussex	Nottinghamshire won by an innings and 88 runs
Scorecard	447 (77.5 overs); Riki Wessels 202* (177); Steve Magoffin 5/51 (18 overs)		155 (37.5 overs); Jofra Archer 40 (29); James Pattinson 4/22 (8 overs)	Trent Bridge, Nottingham; Umpires: Peter Hartley and David Millns
Scorecard			204 (51.5 overs) (f/o); Chris Nash 53 (80); James Pattinson 3/33 (12 overs)	Trent Bridge, Nottingham; Umpires: Peter Hartley and David Millns
No toss, Sussex elected to field.; Points: Nottinghamshire 24, Sussex 3.

21–22 April 2017	Worcestershire (H)	v	Northamptonshire	Worcestershire won by 20 runs
Scorecard	188 (49.4 overs); Moeen Ali 50 (89); Andy Carter 3/51 (13 overs)		157 (35 overs); Ben Duckett 47 (63); Joe Leach 5/60 (16 overs)	New Road, Worcester; Umpires: Jeff Evans and Neil Mallender
Scorecard	153 (40.4 overs); Ed Barnard 26* (16); Nathan Buck 4/42 (13.4 overs)		164 (43.4 overs); Max Holden 37 (86); Joe Leach 5/62 (15.4 overs)	New Road, Worcester; Umpires: Jeff Evans and Neil Mallender
No toss, Northamptonshire elected to field.; Points: Worcestershire 19, Northamptonshire 3.

==== May ====
19–22 May 2017	Derbyshire (H)	v	Worcestershire	Worcestershire won by an innings and 42 runs
Scorecard	275 (92.1 overs); Luis Reece 54 (120); Joe Leach 4/50 (23 overs)		415/9d (89.2 overs); Brett D'Oliveira 150 (232); Shiv Thakor 4/45 (12.2 overs)	County Ground, Derby; Umpires: Steve O'Shaughnessy and Russell Warren
Scorecard	98 (29.4 overs); Tony Palladino 28 (28); Joe Leach 5/32 (13 overs)			County Ground, Derby; Umpires: Steve O'Shaughnessy and Russell Warren
No toss, Worcestershire elected to field.; 56 overs were lost on day one due to rain. Only 23.1 overs were then possible on day two due to rain.; Points: Worcestershire 24, Derbyshire 5.

19–22 May 2017	Nottinghamshire	v	Glamorgan (H)	Match drawn
Scorecard	448 (126 overs); Riki Wessels 120 (136); Timm van der Gugten 5/101 (32 overs)		187 (62.3 overs); Aneurin Donald 53 (76); Luke Fletcher 3/60 (16 overs)	Sophia Gardens, Cardiff; Umpires: Rob Bailey and Ian Blackwell
Scorecard			420/5d (171 overs) (f/o); Colin Ingram 155* (427); Luke Fletcher 2/73 (25 overs)	Sophia Gardens, Cardiff; Umpires: Rob Bailey and Ian Blackwell
Nottinghamshire won the toss and elected to bat.; Points: Nottinghamshire 12, Glamorgan 7.

19–22 May 2017	Leicestershire (H)	v	Kent	Match drawn
Scorecard	420 (112.4 overs); Colin Ackermann 89 (194); Matt Hunn 3/110 (22 overs)		462/9d (96.1 overs); Darren Stevens 100 (98); Dieter Klein 4/108 (21 overs)	Grace Road, Leicester; Umpires: Jeff Evans and Russell Evans
Scorecard	61/2d (18.5 overs); Paul Horton 40 (47); Matt Hunn 1/2 (3.5 overs)			Grace Road, Leicester; Umpires: Jeff Evans and Russell Evans
No toss, Kent elected to field.; No play was possible on day one due to rain. 48.3 overs were then lost on day two due to rain.; Points: Leicestershire 13, Kent 13.

21–24 May 2017	Durham	v	Sussex (H)	Sussex win by an innings and 177 runs
Scorecard	287 (82.4 overs); Paul Coughlin 73 (122); Jofra Archer 5/76 (19.4 overs)		668 (150.3 overs); Luke Wells 258 (311); Paul Coughlin 3/127 (28 overs)	County Ground, Hove; Umpires: Ben Debenham and Graham Lloyd
Scorecard	204 (86.2 overs); James Weighell 58 (55); Vernon Philander 4/39 (15.2 overs)			County Ground, Hove; Umpires: Ben Debenham and Graham Lloyd
Sussex won the toss and elected to field.; Points: Sussex 24, Durham 3

25–28 May 2017	Leicestershire	v	Derbyshire (H)	Match drawn
Scorecard	619 (144.3 overs); Mark Cosgrove 188 (220); Jeevan Mendis 6/204 (52.3 overs)		533 (142.5 overs); Billy Godleman 141 (275); Zak Chappell 4/108 (23.5 overs)	County Ground, Derby; Umpires: David Millns and Billy Taylor
Scorecard	217/3d (57 overs); Harry Dearden 78 (123); Jeevan Mendis 2/79 (22 overs)		42/0 (10 overs); Ben Slater 28* (38)	County Ground, Derby; Umpires: David Millns and Billy Taylor
Leicestershire won the toss and elected to bat.; Points: Derbyshire 11, Leicestershire 11.

26–29 May 2017	Durham	v	Glamorgan (H)	Glamorgan won by 3 wickets
Scorecard	342 (94 overs); Paul Collingwood 127 (174); Michael Hogan 5/49 (22 overs)		353 (92 overs); Andrew Salter 75 (131); Paul Coughlin 4/87 (23 overs)	St. Helen's, Swansea; Umpires: Paul Baldwin and Russell Evans
Scorecard	276/7d (76 overs); Paul Collingwood 92* (145); Andrew Salter 2/46 (13 overs)		266/7 (50.3 overs); Nicholas Selman 116* (129); George Harding 4/111 (19 overs)	St. Helen's, Swansea; Umpires: Paul Baldwin and Russell Evans
Durham won the toss and elected to bat.; George Harding (Durham) made his first-class debut.; Glamorgan 23, Durham 6.

26–29 May 2017	Kent (H)	v	Sussex	Kent won by 147 runs
Scorecard	369 (104.1 overs); Joe Denly 119 (208); David Wiese 3/54 (15 overs)		164 (49.5 overs); David Wiese 36 (72); Darren Stevens 5/40 (17 overs)	Nevill Ground, Tunbridge Wells; Umpires: Stephen Gale and Peter Hartley
Scorecard	298/2d (67 overs); Daniel Bell-Drummond 90 (150); Stiaan van Zyl 1/42 (9 overs)		356 (105.4 overs); Stiaan van Zyl 78 (134); James Harris 4/103 (26.4 overs)	Nevill Ground, Tunbridge Wells; Umpires: Stephen Gale and Peter Hartley
Kent won the toss and elected to bat.; Points: Kent 23, Sussex 3.

26–29 May 2017	Northamptonshire (H)	v	Worcestershire	Worcestershire won by 8 wickets
Scorecard	238 (64.1 overs); Alex Wakely 49 (93); Joe Leach 3/36 (15 overs)		434 (106.3 overs); Daryl Mitchell 168 (244); Nathan Buck 5/90 (23 overs)	County Ground, Northampton; Umpires: Patrick Gustard and Martin Saggers
Scorecard	343 (87.1 overs); Rob Keogh 88* (166); Nathan Lyon 3/94 (29 overs)		151/2 (27.4 overs); Daryl Mitchell 78* (78); Rory Kleinveldt 2/28 (9 overs)	County Ground, Northampton; Umpires: Patrick Gustard and Martin Saggers
No toss, Worcestershire elected to field.; Points: Worcestershire 24, Northamptonshire 4.

26–29 May 2017	Nottinghamshire (H)	v	Gloucestershire	Nottinghamshire won by an innings and 50 runs
Scorecard	430/9d (116.4 overs); Michael Lumb 117 (204); Craig Miles 4/123 (25 overs)		149 (44.1 overs); Phil Mustard 53 (80); Luke Fletcher 3/32 (10 overs)	Trent Bridge, Nottingham; Umpires: Mike Burns and Jeff Evans
Scorecard			231 (60.1 overs) (f/o); Cameron Bancroft 53 (91); Steven Mullaney 5/32 (14.1 overs)	Trent Bridge, Nottingham; Umpires: Mike Burns and Jeff Evans
No toss, Gloucestershire elected to field.; Points: Nottinghamshire 24, Gloucestershire 2.

==== June ====
2–5 June 2017	Durham (H)	v	Northamptonshire	Northamptonshire won by 2 wickets
Scorecard	166 (45.2 overs); Michael Richardson 27 (40); Nathan Buck 6/34 (11.2 overs)		338 (95.2 overs); Max Holden 124 (286); Paul Coughlin 5/49 (27 overs)	Riverside Ground, Chester-le-Street; Umpires: Mike Burns and Steve O'Shaughnessy
Scorecard	376 (112 overs); Cameron Steel 128 (227); Azharullah 5/72 (21 overs)		205/8 (38.5 overs); Alex Wakely 84 (95); Paul Coughlin 5/84 (19.5 overs)	Riverside Ground, Chester-le-Street; Umpires: Mike Burns and Steve O'Shaughnessy
No toss, Northamptonshire elected to field.; 26 overs were lost on Day 1.; Points: Northamptonshire 22, Durham 3.

2–5 June 2017	Nottinghamshire (H)	v	Derbyshire	Match drawn
Scorecard	229 (67 overs); Steven Mullaney 76 (95); Tony Palladino 4/44 (14 overs)		363 (106.1 overs); Billy Godleman 121 (198); Harry Gurney 3/55 (18.1 overs)	Trent Bridge, Nottingham; Umpires: Patrick Gustard and Graham Lloyd
Scorecard	349 (93.3 overs); Samit Patel 82 (139); Tom Taylor 4/67 (18 overs)		190/5 (36 overs); Wayne Madsen 61 (57); Luke Fletcher 2/46 (13 overs)	Trent Bridge, Nottingham; Umpires: Patrick Gustard and Graham Lloyd
No toss, Derbyshire elected to field.; 22 overs were lost on Day 3. 40 overs were then lost on Day 4.; Conor McKerr (Derbyshire) made his first-class debut.; Points: Derbyshire 12, Nottinghamshire 9.

2–5 June 2017	Sussex (H)	v	Worcestershire	Sussex won by an innings and 7 runs
Scorecard	579/8d (145.1 overs); Luke Wells 155 (288); Joe Leach 3/101 (27.1 overs)		312 (96.2 overs); Daryl Mitchell 121 (213); Jofra Archer 4/91 (24.2 overs)	County Ground, Hove; Umpires: Steve Garratt and Neil Mallender
Scorecard			260 (86.1 overs) (f/o); Daryl Mitchell 54 (115); Vernon Philander 3/30 (12.1 overs)	County Ground, Hove; Umpires: Steve Garratt and Neil Mallender
No toss, Worcestershire elected to field.; Points: Sussex 23, Worcestershire 4.

8–11 June 2017	Durham	v	Kent (H)	Match drawn
Scorecard	448 (136.1 overs); Paul Collingwood 120 (208); Darren Stevens 5/78 (35 overs)		236 (64.3 overs); Sam Northeast 109* (178); Barry McCarthy 6/63 (19.3 overs)	St Lawrence Ground, Canterbury; Umpires: Jeff Evans and Steve Garratt
Scorecard	271/6d (70 overs); Graham Clark 83 (106); Yasir Shah 2/94 (19 overs)		343/9 (106 overs); Sam Northeast 72 (151); Chris Rushworth 3/62 (25 overs)	St Lawrence Ground, Canterbury; Umpires: Jeff Evans and Steve Garratt
Durham won the toss and elected to bat.; Matthew Potts (Durham) made his first-class debut.; Points: Durham 12, Kent 8.

9–12 June 2017	Gloucestershire (H)	v	Nottinghamshire	Match drawn
Scorecard	303 (111.5 overs); Gareth Roderick 96 (215); Harry Gurney 3/68 (30 overs)		535/8d (166 overs); Samit Patel 257* (452); Craig Miles 2/88 (29 overs)	County Ground, Bristol; Umpires: Martin Saggers and Russell Warren
Scorecard	254/5 (96 overs); Graeme van Buuren 88* (242); Luke Fletcher 2/58 (16 overs)			County Ground, Bristol; Umpires: Martin Saggers and Russell Warren
No toss, Nottinghamshire elected to field.; Points: Nottinghamshire 11, Gloucestershire 9.

9–12 June 2017	Leicestershire (H)	v	Sussex	Sussex won by 5 wickets
Scorecard	340 (101.5 overs); Mark Cosgrove 128 (186); Jofra Archer 5/67 (30 overs)		284 (84.5 overs); Vernon Philander 73* (118); Clint McKay 4/35 (22 overs)	Grace Road, Leicester; Umpires: Nitin Menon and Alex Wharf
Scorecard	175 (59.4 overs); Harry Dearden 36 (74); Jofra Archer 6/70 (19.4 overs)		234/5 (68.3 overs); Luke Wells 90* (190); Ben Raine 3/50 (19 overs)	Grace Road, Leicester; Umpires: Nitin Menon and Alex Wharf
No toss, Sussex elected to field.; Points: Sussex 21, Leicestershire 6.

9–12 June 2017	Northamptonshire (H)	v	Derbyshire	Northamptonshire won by 128 runs
Scorecard	218 (53.2 overs); Rob Newton 67 (112); Conor McKerr 5/87 (16.2 overs)		176 (52.2 overs); Alex Hughes 62* (115); Ben Sanderson 5/52 (17 overs)	County Ground, Northampton; Umpires: Nigel Cowley and Graham Lloyd
Scorecard	277 (97.3 overs); Rob Newton 108 (203); Conor McKerr 5/54 (24.3 overs)		191 (53 overs); Tom Taylor 69 (61); Ben Sanderson 4/31 (17 overs)	County Ground, Northampton; Umpires: Nigel Cowley and Graham Lloyd
No toss, Derbyshire elected to field.; Points: Northamptonshire 20, Derbyshire 3.

9–12 June 2017	Worcestershire (H)	v	Glamorgan	Glamorgan won by 9 wickets
Scorecard	267 (70.4 overs); Ben Cox 93 (99); Timm van der Gugten 4/66 (19 overs)		381 (101.5 overs); Jacques Rudolph 111 (209); Josh Tongue 6/97 (25 overs)	New Road, Worcester; Umpires: Mike Burns and Michael Gough
Scorecard	129 (46.3 overs); Tom Fell 33 (87); Michael Hogan 5/38 (14.3 overs)		18/1 (8.5 overs); Jacques Rudolph 11* (18); Ed Barnard 1/6 (4 overs)	New Road, Worcester; Umpires: Mike Burns and Michael Gough
No toss, Glamorgan elected to field.; Points: Glamorgan 23, Worcestershire 5.

19–22 June 2017	Glamorgan	v	Durham (H)	Durham won by 9 wickets
Scorecard	295 (115.5 overs); Nick Selman 103 (252); Chris Rushworth 5/52 (25 overs)		402 (110.1 overs); Graham Clark 109 (135); Marchant de Lange 5/95 (31 overs)	Riverside Ground, Chester-le-Street; Umpires: Stephen Gale and Martin Saggers
Scorecard	263 (95 overs); Colin Ingram 70* (137); Barry McCarthy 4/65 (25 overs)		158/1 (24.3 overs); Stephen Cook 89* (78); Andrew Salter 1/49 (5.3 overs)	Riverside Ground, Chester-le-Street; Umpires: Stephen Gale and Martin Saggers
Glamorgan won the toss and elected to bat.; Points: Durham 23, Glamorgan 5.

19–22 June 2017	Nottinghamshire (H)	v	Leicestershire	Nottinghamshire won by an innings and 280 runs
Scorecard	548/9d (134 overs); Samit Patel 247 (305); Dieter Klein 6/142 (31 overs)		134 (49.5 overs); Paul Horton 31 (66); James Pattinson 5/33 (12 overs)	Trent Bridge, Nottingham; Umpires: Steve O'Shaughnessy and Paul Pollard
Scorecard			134 (31.1 overs) (f/o); Clint McKay 41* (24); Luke Fletcher 3/16 (6 overs)	Trent Bridge, Nottingham; Umpires: Steve O'Shaughnessy and Paul Pollard
No toss, Leicestershire elected to field.; Points: Nottinghamshire 24, Leicestershire 2.

19–22 June 2017	Kent	v	Worcestershire (H)	Worcestershire won by 4 wickets
Scorecard	260 (73.1 overs); Matt Coles 47 (63); Joe Leach 3/42 (14 overs)		336 (85.4 overs); Joe Clarke 142 (197); Matt Coles 6/84 (18.4 overs)	New Road, Worcester; Umpires: Richard Illingworth and Nitin Menon
Scorecard	474 (116.4 overs); Joe Denly 227 (320); Joe Leach 4/79 (20.4 overs)		401/6 (81.5 overs); Daryl Mitchell 142 (243); Yasir Shah 5/132 (27.5 overs)	New Road, Worcester; Umpires: Richard Illingworth and Nitin Menon
Kent won the toss and elected to bat.; Points: Worcestershire 22, Kent 5.

26–29 June 2017 (D/N)	Durham (H)	v	Worcestershire	Match drawn
Scorecard	197 (52.2 overs); Stuart Poynter 43 (68); Josh Tongue 4/41 (12.2 overs)		367 (86.4 overs); Brett D'Oliveira 122 (176); Mark Wood 5/54 (18.4 overs)	Riverside Ground, Chester-le-Street; Umpires: Nigel Cowley and Billy Taylor
No toss, Worcestershire elected to field.; 44 overs were lost on Day 2. No play was then possible on Day 3 and 4.; Points: Worcestershire 12, Durham 8.

26–29 June 2017 (D/N)	Derbyshire	v	Glamorgan (H)	Derbyshire won by 39 runs
Scorecard	288 (92 overs); Wayne Madsen 70 (107); Marchant de Lange 3/82 (26 overs)		237 (93.4 overs); Nick Selman 50 (159); Tony Palladino 4/36 (16.4 overs)	Sophia Gardens, Cardiff; Umpires: Paul Pollard and Alex Wharf
Scorecard	160 (44.2 overs); Luis Reece 55 (95); Marchant de Lange 3/53 (11 overs)		172 (69.3 overs); Nick Selman 43 (122); Hamidullah Qadri 5/60 (26.3 overs)	Sophia Gardens, Cardiff; Umpires: Paul Pollard and Alex Wharf
Derbyshire won the toss and elected to bat.; 39 overs were lost on Day 3.; Hamidullah Qadri (Derbyshire) made his first-class debut.; Points: Derbyshire 21, Glamorgan 4.

26–29 June 2017 (D/N)	Northamptonshire (H)	v	Leicestershire	Northamptonshire won by 2 runs
Scorecard	261 (68.3 overs); Ben Duckett 112 (102); Dieter Klein 6/80 (15.3 overs)		157 (59.5 overs); Lewis Hill 38* (72); Richard Gleeson 3/33 (15 overs)	County Ground, Northampton; Umpires: Ben Debenham and Russell Evans
Scorecard	289/7d (61 overs); Alex Wakely 112 (121); Colin Ackermann 3/45 (12 overs)		391 (102.2 overs); Colin Ackermann 105 (198); Richard Gleeson 4/109 (29 overs)	County Ground, Northampton; Umpires: Ben Debenham and Russell Evans
Northamptonshire won the toss and elected to bat.; 37 overs were lost on Day 2. 27 overs were then lost on Day 3.; Points: Northamptonshire 21, Leicestershire 3.

26–29 June 2017 (D/N)	Kent	v	Nottinghamshire (H)	Match drawn
Scorecard	180 (54 overs); Daniel Bell-Drummond 84* (169); Steven Mullaney 3/2 (3 overs)		371 (104 overs); Steven Mullaney 168 (276); Matt Coles 3/99 (23 overs)	Trent Bridge, Nottingham; Umpires: Neil Bainton and Graham Lloyd
Scorecard	265 (92.2 overs); Adam Milne 51 (88); Harry Gurney 3/63 (21 overs)			Trent Bridge, Nottingham; Umpires: Neil Bainton and Graham Lloyd
Kent won the toss and elected to bat.; Only 40 overs were possible on Day 3. Only 21 overs were then possible on Day 4.; Points: Nottinghamshire 12, Kent 8.

26–29 June 2017 (D/N)	Sussex (H)	v	Gloucestershire	Match drawn
Scorecard	358/9d (87 overs); Luke Wright 118 (129); Jack Taylor 3/93 (21 overs)		150/1d (51 overs); Cameron Bancroft 69* (145); Abidine Sakande 1/38 (12 overs)	County Ground, Hove; Umpires: Paul Baldwin and Steve O'Shaughnessy
Scorecard	142/1d (18.1 overs); Harry Finch 74* (59); Cameron Bancroft 1/67 (7 overs)		212/6 (72.1 overs); Jack Taylor 69* (112); Jofra Archer 2/31 (18 overs)	County Ground, Hove; Umpires: Paul Baldwin and Steve O'Shaughnessy
Sussex won the toss and elected to bat.; No play was possible on Day 2. 44 overs were then lost on Day 3.; Points: Sussex 9, Gloucestershire 8.

==== July ====
3–6 July 2017	Derbyshire (H)	v	Durham	Durham won by 6 wickets
Scorecard	368 (110.3 overs); Matthew Critchley 102 (148); Matthew Potts 3/75 (27 overs)		301 (87.3 overs); Paul Coughlin 73* (108); Imran Tahir 5/110 (33 overs)	Queen's Park, Chesterfield; Umpires: Jeremy Lloyds and Paul Pollard
Scorecard	214 (65.1 overs); Alex Hughes 108 (156); Chris Rushworth 2/29 (10 overs)		285/4 (80.2 overs); Jack Burnham 93* (122); Imran Tahir 2/89 (31 overs)	Queen's Park, Chesterfield; Umpires: Jeremy Lloyds and Paul Pollard
Derbyshire won the toss and elected to bat.; Points: Durham 22, Derbyshire 7.

3–4 July 2017	Glamorgan	v	Gloucestershire (H)	Gloucestershire won by 10 wickets
Scorecard	117 (32.1 overs); Aneurin Donald 39 (41); David Payne 3/37 (9.1 overs)		141 (41.2 overs); Kieran Noema-Barnett 34 (39); Michael Hogan 3/25 (8.2 overs)	College Ground, Cheltenham; Umpires: Neil Bainton and Russell Evans
Scorecard	158 (55 overs); Andrew Salter 31 (77); Liam Norwell 6/38 (18 overs)		137/0 (31.3 overs); Chris Dent 68[[not out}*]] (99)	College Ground, Cheltenham; Umpires: Neil Bainton and Russell Evans
Gloucestershire won the toss and elected to field.; Points: Gloucestershire 19, Glamorgan 3.

3–6 July 2017	Kent (H)	v	Northamptonshire	Match drawn
Scorecard	701/7d (143.1 overs); Sean Dickson 318 (408); Max Holden 2/59 (9 overs)		568 (156.2 overs); Max Holden 153 (265); Yasir Shah 4/165 (57 overs)	Kent County Cricket Ground, Beckenham; Umpires: Paul Baldwin and David Millns
Scorecard	184/3d (58 overs); Joe Denly 78* (172); Ben Sanderson 1/7 (4 overs)			Kent County Cricket Ground, Beckenham; Umpires: Paul Baldwin and David Millns
Kent won the toss and elected to bat.; Points: Kent 11, Northamptonshire 9.

5–8 July 2017	Sussex (H)	v	Leicestershire	Sussex won by 231 runs
Scorecard	262 (69.1 overs); Stiaan van Zyl 49 (81); Clint McKay 4/59 (20 overs)		281 (97.3 overs); Lewis Hill 49 (109); Jofra Archer 3/51 (24 overs)	Arundel Castle Cricket Ground; Umpires: Martin Saggers and Billy Taylor
Scorecard	443/6d (104 overs); Stiaan van Zyl 166* (252); Clint McKay 2/62 (23 overs)		193 (69.1 overs); Colin Ackermann 43 (85); Jofra Archer 4/30 (19 overs)	Arundel Castle Cricket Ground; Umpires: Martin Saggers and Billy Taylor
Sussex won the toss and elected to bat.; William Fazackerley (Leicestershire) made his first-class debut.; Points: Sussex 21, Leicestershire 5.

9–12 July 2017	Gloucestershire (H)	v	Worcestershire	Match drawn
Scorecard	383 (102.1 overs); Jack Taylor 143 (170); Ed Barnard 4/93 (28 overs)		300/9d (77 overs); Ben Cox 124 (169); Kieran Noema-Barnett 4/31 (16 overs)	College Ground, Cheltenham; Umpires: Ian Blackwell and Russell Evans
Scorecard	286/4d (66.4 overs); Chris Dent 135* (203); Daryl Mitchell 1/16 (1.4 overs)		155/5 (42 overs); Joe Clarke 93* (95); David Payne 2/16 (5 overs)	College Ground, Cheltenham; Umpires: Ian Blackwell and Russell Evans
No toss, Worcestershire elected to field.; Only 15.3 overs were possible on Day 3.; Points: Gloucestershire 12, Worcestershire 11

==== August ====
6–9 August 2017	Derbyshire (H)	v	Nottinghamshire	Nottinghamshire won by an innings and 61 runs
Scorecard	220 (59.2 overs); Alex Hughes 55* (98); Brett Hutton 5/52 (16 overs)		508/9d (103.3 overs); Alex Hales 218 (218); Tom Taylor 2/75 (16 overs)	County Ground, Derby; Umpires: Tom Lungley and Neil Mallender
Scorecard	227 (74.5 overs); Billy Godleman 47 (93); Brett Hutton 5/74 (18.5 overs)			County Ground, Derby; Umpires: Tom Lungley and Neil Mallender
No toss, Nottinghamshire elected to field.; Points: Nottinghamshire 24, Derbyshire 4.

6–9 August 2017	Durham	v	Leicestershire (H)	Match drawn
Scorecard	525/8d (142 overs); Cameron Steel 224 (408); Neil Dexter 5/71 (25 overs)		124/4 (48 overs); Paul Horton 38 (65); Matty Potts 2/30 (11 overs)	Grace Road, Leicestershire; Umpires: Neil Bainton and Mike Burns
Durham won the toss and elected to bat.; No play was possible on Day 3 and 4.; Points: Durham 10, Leicestershire 6.

6–9 August 2017	Northamptonshire (H)	v	Gloucestershire	Match drawn
Scorecard	343 (93.1 overs); Rob Newton 70 (96); Liam Norwell 3/70 (23 overs)		265 (77.3 overs); George Hankins 73 (125); Richard Gleeson 5/46 (19.3 overs)	County Ground, Northampton; Umpires: Ben Debenham and Michael Gough
Scorecard	50/5 (16 overs); Alex Wakely 23* (42); Liam Norwell 3/25 (8 overs)			County Ground, Northampton; Umpires: Ben Debenham and Michael Gough
Northamptonshire won the toss and elected to bat.; No play was possible on Day 3 and 4.; George Drissell (Gloucestershire) made his first-class debut.; Points: Northamptonshire 11, Gloucestershire 10.

6–8 August 2017	Sussex	v	Worcestershire (H)	Sussex won by 9 wickets
Scorecard	430 (120.1 overs); Chris Nash 118 (202); Ed Barnard 3/93 (26 overs)		268 (73.5 overs); Joe Clarke 77 (79); Chris Jordan 4/77 (21 overs)	New Road, Worcester; Umpires: Jeff Evans and Russell Evans
Scorecard	11/1 (2.5 overs); Luke Wells 5 (9); Ed Barnard 1/1 (1 over)		170 (45.1 overs) (f/o); Ed Barnard 46 (45); David Wiese 3/35 (12 overs)	New Road, Worcester; Umpires: Jeff Evans and Russell Evans
Sussex won the toss and elected to bat.; Patrick Brown (Worcestershire) made his first-class debut.; Points: Sussex 23, Worcestershire 4.

28–31 August 2017	Durham (H)	v	Derbyshire	Durham won by 9 wickets
Scorecard	480/9d (120.4 overs); Paul Collingwood 177 (228); Hardus Viljoen 5/130 (33 overs)		164 (64.3 overs); Alex Hughes 47 (80); Graham Onions 4/44 (21 overs)	Riverside Ground, Chester-le-Street; Umpires: Rob Bailey and Neil Bainton
Scorecard	39/1 (9.2 overs); Tom Latham 23* (27); Hardus Viljoen 1/24 (5 overs)		354 (109.2 overs) (f/o); Luis Reece 106 (227); Graham Onions 3/88 (28 overs)	Riverside Ground, Chester-le-Street; Umpires: Rob Bailey and Neil Bainton
No toss. Derbyshire elected to field.; Points: Durham 24, Derbyshire 2.

28–30 August 2017	Glamorgan (H)	v	Sussex	Sussex won by 1 wicket
Scorecard	294 (75.3 overs); Craig Meschede 87 (96); Ollie Robinson 4/46 (18.3 overs)		268 (59.5 overs); Ben Brown 77 (95); Craig Meschede 4/61 (17.5 overs)	Penrhyn Avenue, Colwyn Bay; Umpires: Graham Lloyd and Tim Robinson
Scorecard	182 (58.3 overs); Craig Meschede 41 (70); Chris Jordan 5/46 (16.3 overs)		211/9 (54.4 overs); Chris Nash 68 (105); Lukas Carey 3/40 (14 overs)	Penrhyn Avenue, Colwyn Bay; Umpires: Graham Lloyd and Tim Robinson
No toss. Sussex elected to field.; Points: Sussex 21, Glamorgan 5.

28–31 August 2017	Leicestershire	v	Kent (H)	Match drawn
Scorecard	350 (101.4 overs); Lewis Hill 85 (184); Darren Stevens 8/75 (25.4 overs)		333 (93.5 overs); Sam Northeast 97 (170); Neil Dexter 5/76 (20 overs)	St Lawrence Ground, Canterbury; Umpires: Martin Saggers and Russell Warren
Scorecard	135/6 (36 overs); Mark Cosgrove 34 (19); Imran Qayyum 2/25 (10 overs)			St Lawrence Ground, Canterbury; Umpires: Martin Saggers and Russell Warren
Leicestershire won the toss and elected to bat.; No play was possible on Day 3. Only 44 overs were then possible on Day 4.; Points: Leicestershire 12, Kent 11.

28–31 August 2017	Nottinghamshire (H)	v	Northamptonshire	Nottinghamshire win by 163 runs
Scorecard	213 (50.1 overs); Riki Wessels 69 (80); Azharullah 5/63 (14 overs)		141 (37.5 overs); Josh Cobb 46* (49); Brett Hutton 3/25 (9 overs)	Trent Bridge, Nottingham; Umpires: Jeremy Lloyds and Steve O'Shaughnessy
Scorecard	344/9d (67.2 overs); Riki Wessels 116 (88); Azharullah 3/73 (18.2 overs)		253 (66.5 overs); Rob Newton 53 (113); Samit Patel 3/17 (4.5 overs)	Trent Bridge, Nottingham; Umpires: Jeremy Lloyds and Steve O'Shaughnessy
Nottinghamshire won the toss and elected to bat.; Points: Nottinghamshire 20, Northamptonshire 3.; Northamptonshire was deducted 5 points for a slow over rate.

28–31 August 2017	Worcestershire (H)	v	Gloucestershire	Worcestershire won by 189 runs
Scorecard	363 (102.4 overs); Brett D'Oliveira 93 (188); Liam Norwell 4/54 (15 overs)		258 (75.3 overs); Jack Taylor 101* (143); Ed Barnard 4/23 (13.3 overs)	New Road, Worcester; Umpires: Peter Hartley and Alex Wharf
Scorecard	295/8d (71.4 overs); Daryl Mitchell 130 (193); Tom Smith 3/73 (19.4 overs)		211 (77.2 overs); Gareth Roderick 47 (101); Ravichandran Ashwin 5/68 (34 overs)	New Road, Worcester; Umpires: Peter Hartley and Alex Wharf
Worcestershire won the toss and elected to bat.; Points: Worcestershire 23, Gloucestershire 5.

==== September ====
5–8 September 2017	Derbyshire (H)	v	Glamorgan	Match drawn
Scorecard	236/9 (72 overs); Luis Reece 53 (93); Lukas Carey 3/49 (17 overs)			County Ground, Derby; Umpires: Graham Lloyd and Billy Taylor
No toss. Glamorgan elected to field.; No play was possible on Day 1 and 2. 18 overs were then lost on Day 3. No play was then possible on Day 4.; Points: Glamorgan 8, Derbyshire 6

5–8 September 2017	Durham (H)	v	Kent	Match drawn
Scorecard	217 (67.2 overs); Mark Wood 72* (89); Mitchell Claydon 5/54 (16.2 overs)		206 (43.5 overs); Sam Northeast 110 (164); Graham Onions 6/62 (14 overs)	Riverside Ground, Chester-le-Street; Umpires: Stephen Gale and Michael Gough
Scorecard	359/7d (88.3 overs); Tom Latham 119 (242); Calum Haggett 3/82 (24 overs)		184/9 (56 overs); Sam Billings 70* (96); James Weighell 3/51 (12 overs)	Riverside Ground, Chester-le-Street; Umpires: Stephen Gale and Michael Gough
No toss. Kent elected to field.; Only 32 overs were possible on Day 1. Only 29 overs were then possible on Day 3.; Points: Durham 9, Kent 9.

5–8 September 2017	Leicestershire (H)	v	Gloucestershire	Gloucestershire won by 10 wickets
Scorecard	222 (59.5 overs); Mark Cosgrove 92 (126); Josh Shaw 4/54 (13.5 overs)		368 (93.1 overs); James Bracey 63 (114); Ben Raine 3/92 (25.1 overs)	Grace Road, Leicester; Umpires: Nigel Cowley and Jeff Evans
Scorecard	160 (49 overs); Mark Cosgrove 68 (85); Liam Norwell 8/43 (17 overs)		15/0 (3.3 overs); Chris Dent 11 (9)	Grace Road, Leicester; Umpires: Nigel Cowley and Jeff Evans
No toss. Gloucestershire elected to field.; Only 26.3 overs were possible on Day 1.; Points: Gloucestershire 23, Leicestershire 4.

5–8 September 2017	Northamptonshire (H)	v	Sussex	Northamptonshire won by 6 wickets
Scorecard	426 (101.4 overs); Ben Duckett 193 (200); Ollie Robinson 4/81 (22 overs)		172 (56.4 overs); Angus Robson 33 (38); Rory Kleinveldt 5/50 (15.4 overs)	County Ground, Northampton; Umpires: Ian Blackwell and Richard Kettleborough
Scorecard	140/4 (34 overs); Richard Levi 54* (63); Ollie Robinson 2/47 (9 overs)		393 (105.4 overs) (f/o); Jofra Archer 81* (125); Rory Kleinveldt 3/48 (19 overs)	County Ground, Northampton; Umpires: Ian Blackwell and Richard Kettleborough
No toss. Sussex elected to field.; 15.2 overs were lost on Day 1.; Points: Northamptonshire 24, Sussex 3.

5–8 September 2017	Nottinghamshire (H)	v	Worcestershire	Worcestershire win by 8 wickets
Scorecard	193 (49.2 overs); Jake Libby 34 (47); Ed Barnard 4/71 (16 overs)		243 (57.4 overs); Ed Barnard 55 (72); Steven Mullaney 4/31 (12.4 overs)	Trent Bridge, Nottingham; Umpires: Martin Saggers and Nicholas Cook
Scorecard	275 (76.4 overs); Riki Wessels 60 (79); Joe Leach 5/69 (19 overs)		229/2 (61.3 overs); Daryl Mitchell 139* (212); Steven Mullaney 1/43 (12 overs)	Trent Bridge, Nottingham; Umpires: Martin Saggers and Nicholas Cook
No toss. Worcestershire elected to field.; 42.1 overs were lost on Day 1.; Points: Worcestershire 20, Nottinghamshire 3.

12–15 September 2017	Glamorgan (H)	v	Northamptonshire	Northamptonshire won by 7 wickets
Scorecard	207 (64.1 overs); Andrew Salter 59 (122); Richard Gleeson 5/60 (19.1 overs)		310 (78.1 overs); Richard Levi 101 (97); Michael Hogan 4/58 (22 overs)	Sophia Gardens, Cardiff; Umpires: Stephen Gale and David Millns
Scorecard	320 (94.1 overs); Chris Cooke 69 (116); Richard Gleeson 3/71 (24.1 overs)		221/3 (58.4 overs); Simon Kerrigan 62 (101); Michael Hogan 2/36 (14 overs)	Sophia Gardens, Cardiff; Umpires: Stephen Gale and David Millns
Glamorgan won the toss and elected to bat.; Points: Northamptonshire 22, Glamorgan 4.

12–15 September 2017	Gloucestershire (H)	v	Kent	Match drawn
Scorecard	385 (131.5 overs); Cameron Bancroft 206* (393); Darren Stevens 3/50 (19 overs)		386 (97 overs); Sam Northeast 66 (90); Josh Shaw 5/118 (25 overs)	County Ground, Bristol; Umpires: Jeff Evans and Russell Warren
Scorecard	294/9d (95 overs); Gareth Roderick 78* (110); Darren Stevens 5/77 (20 overs)			County Ground, Bristol; Umpires: Jeff Evans and Russell Warren
No toss. Kent elected to field.; 22 overs were lost on Day 2. 20 overs were then lost on Day 4.; Points: Kent 12, Gloucestershire 11.

12–15 September 2017	Derbyshire	v	Sussex (H)	Derbyshire won by 45 runs
Scorecard	338 (96.1 overs); Luis Reece 51 (66); David Wiese 4/63 (21 overs)		271 (63.5 overs); Luke Wright 70* (121); Hardus Viljoen 7/80 (17.5 overs)	County Ground, Hove; Umpires: Ian Blackwell and Jeremy Lloyds
Scorecard	322/8d (101 overs); Harry Podmore 66* (117); Stuart Whittingham 5/80 (24 overs)		344 (80.1 overs); Stiaan van Zyl 85 (178); Hardus Viljoen 8/90 (25 overs)	County Ground, Hove; Umpires: Ian Blackwell and Jeremy Lloyds
Sussex won the toss and elected to field.; Points: Derbyshire 22, Sussex 5.

12–15 September 2017	Leicestershire	v	Worcestershire (H)	Worcestershire won by 6 wickets
Scorecard	404 (114.4 overs); Neil Dexter 114 (154); Joe Leach 3/80 (25 overs)		493 (118 overs); Brett D'Oliveira 138 (207); Callum Parkinson 8/148 (45 overs)	New Road, Worcester; Umpires: Neil Bainton and Peter Hartley
Scorecard	220 (63.2 overs); Zak Chappell 66 (84); Ravichandran Ashwin 3/94 (25.2 overs)		132/4 (30.2 overs); Joe Clarke 35 (44); Callum Parkinson 2/37 (11 overs)	New Road, Worcester; Umpires: Neil Bainton and Peter Hartley
Leicestershire won the toss and elected to bat; Points: Worcestershire 24, Leicestershire 6.

19–22 September 2017	Derbyshire (H)	v	Kent	Match abandoned
Scorecard				County Ground, Derby; Umpires: Stephen Gale and Billy Taylor
Match abandoned without a ball bowled.; Points: Derbyshire 5, Kent 5.

19–22 September 2017	Sussex	v	Durham (H)	Sussex won by 132 runs
Scorecard	346 (90.3 overs); Luke Wells 122 (205); Chris Rushworth 4/64 (20.3 overs)		385 (106.5 overs); Graham Clark 88 (132); Ollie Robinson 5/69 (26 overs)	Riverside Ground, Chester-le-Street; Umpires: Jeff Evans and Russell Evans
Scorecard	302 (72.1 overs); Philip Salt 72 (106); James Weighell 3/68 (13 overs)		131 (42.2 overs); James Weighell 38 (45); George Garton 3/20 (6 overs)	Riverside Ground, Chester-le-Street; Umpires: Jeff Evans and Russell Evans
Durham won the toss and elected to field.; Points: Sussex 22, Durham 7.

19–22 September 2017	Glamorgan (H)	v	Gloucestershire	Match drawn
Scorecard	442 (117.2 overs); Kiran Carlson 191 (319); Jack Taylor 3/50 (7.2 overs)		399/8d (110 overs); Benny Howell 163 (236); Craig Meschede 3/81 (24 overs)	Sophia Gardens, Cardiff; Umpires: Neil Bainton and Paul Pollard
Scorecard	353/3 (80 overs); Nick Selman 142* (237); David Payne 1/40 (12 overs)			Sophia Gardens, Cardiff; Umpires: Neil Bainton and Paul Pollard
No toss. Gloucestershire elected to field.; Points: Glamorgan 11, Gloucestershire 11.

19–22 September 2017	Northamptonshire (H)	v	Nottinghamshire	Northamptonshire won by 124 runs
Scorecard	194 (63.1 overs); Rory Kleinveldt 43 (63); Luke Wood 4/52 (15.1 overs)		151 (56.2 overs); Luke Wood 44 (74); Rory Kleinveldt 9/65 (24.2 overs)	County Ground, Northampton; Umpires: Jeremy Lloyds and David Millns
Scorecard	270 (52.2 overs); Richard Levi 115 (104); Luke Wood 4/31 (8.2 overs)		189 (66.1 overs); Luke Wood 44 (79); Rory Kleinveldt 4/33 (15 overs)	County Ground, Northampton; Umpires: Jeremy Lloyds and David Millns
No toss. Nottinghamshire elected to field.; Only 25.3 overs were possible on Day 3.; Points: Northamptonshire 19, Nottinghamshire 3.

25–28 September 2017	Derbyshire	v	Gloucestershire (H)	Derbyshire won by 157 runs
Scorecard	460 (115.1 overs); Alex Hughes 142 (263); Matt Taylor 3/80 (23 overs)		224/2d (57 overs); James Bracey 82* (159); Harry Podmore 1/51 (17 overs)	County Ground, Bristol; Umpires: Neil Bainton and Ben Debenham
Scorecard	144/0d (13.4 overs); Ben Slater 74* (38)		223 (59.3 overs); George Hankins 48 (60); Imran Tahir 5/76 (18.3 overs)	County Ground, Bristol; Umpires: Neil Bainton and Ben Debenham
Gloucestershire won the toss and elected to field.; Only 26 overs were possible on Day 1. 40 overs were then lost on Day 3.; Points: Derbyshire 21, Gloucestershire 3.

25–27 September 2017	Kent (H)	v	Glamorgan	Glamorgan won by 5 wickets
Scorecard	302 (81.2 overs); Joe Denly 152 (204); Michael Hogan 4/44 (18.2 overs)		229 (71.3 overs); Chris Cooke 49 (93); Calum Haggett 3/40 (15 overs)	St Lawrence Ground, Canterbury; Umpires: Nigel Cowley and Jeremy Lloyds
Scorecard	115 (43.2 overs); Adam Rouse 44 (84); Michael Hogan 6/43 (15.2 overs)		192/5 (62.2 overs); Nick Selman 70 (127); Darren Stevens 3/53 (19 overs)	St Lawrence Ground, Canterbury; Umpires: Nigel Cowley and Jeremy Lloyds
No toss. Glamorgan elected to field.; Grant Stewart (Kent) made his first-class debut.; Points: Glamorgan 20, Kent 6.

25–28 September 2017	Leicestershire (H)	v	Northamptonshire	Northamptonshire won by 6 wickets
Scorecard	128 (37.2 overs); Ben Raine 57 (57); Ben Sanderson 5/39 (15.2 overs)		202 (59.1 overs); Luke Procter 82 (148); Ben Raine 5/54 (20 overs)	Grace Road, Leicester; Umpires: Paul Baldwin and Nick Cook
Scorecard	270 (74.4 overs); Mark Cosgrove 80 (134); Simon Kerrigan 4/62 (17.4 overs)		197/4 (49.2 overs); Luke Procter 94 (153); Dieter Klein 2/32 (9 overs)	Grace Road, Leicester; Umpires: Paul Baldwin and Nick Cook
No toss. Northamptonshire elected to field.; No play was possible on Day 1.; Points: Northamptonshire 20, Leicestershire 3.

25–28 September 2017	Sussex (H)	v	Nottinghamshire	Match drawn
Scorecard	565 (133.2 overs); Chris Jordan 147 (168); Steven Mullaney 3/60 (23 overs)		477 (102.3 overs); Billy Root 132 (168); Stuart Whittingham 3/106 (16 overs)	County Ground, Hove; Umpires: Martin Saggers and Billy Taylor
Scorecard	229/7d (50 overs); Luke Wells 103 (98); Matthew Carter 4/106 (17 overs)			County Ground, Hove; Umpires: Martin Saggers and Billy Taylor
No toss. Nottinghamshire elected to field.; 23.3 overs were lost on Day 1. 38 overs were then lost on Day 4.; Points: Sussex 13, Nottinghamshire 12.

25–28 September 2017	Worcestershire (H)	v	Durham	Worcestershire won by 137 runs
Scorecard	335 (90.2 overs); Ravichandran Ashwin 82 (130); Graham Onions 4/68 (22 overs)		208 (63.4 overs); Graham Clark 60 (65); Joe Leach 3/30 (15 overs)	New Road, Worcester; Umpires: Stephen Gale and Steve O'Shaughnessy
Scorecard	242/3d (55 overs); Daryl Mitchell 123* (151); Ryan Pringle 2/51 (12 overs)		232 (56.2 overs); Graham Clark 62 (87); Ravichandran Ashwin 5/95 (23.2 overs)	New Road, Worcester; Umpires: Stephen Gale and Steve O'Shaughnessy
Worcestershire won the toss and elected to bat.; Only 26 overs were possible on Day 1. 24 overs were then lost on Day 3.; Liam Trevaskis (Durham) made his first-class debut.; Points: Worcestershire 22, Durham 4.

== Statistics ==
=== Division One ===
==== Most runs ====
Player	Team	Matches	Innings	Runs	Average	HS	100s	50s
Kumar Sangakkara	Surrey	10	16	1491	106.50	200	8	2
Mark Stoneman	Surrey	12	19	1156	60.84	197	4	4
Rory Burns	Surrey	14	22	1041	49.57	219*	1	8
Jonathan Trott	Warwickshire	14	26	967	37.19	175	3	5
Nick Browne	Essex	14	22	952	43.27	221	1	5

==== Most wickets ====
Players	Team	Matches	Overs	Wickets	Average	BBI	5w	10w
Jamie Porter	Essex	13	399	75	16.83	7–55	5	1
Simon Harmer	Essex	14	521.3	72	19.19	9–95	4	2
Kyle Abbott	Hampshire	14	415.3	60	18.20	7–41	4	0
Jack Leach	Somerset	14	520.1	51	25.78	6–78	4	0
Ben Coad	Yorkshire	12	356.4	50	20.86	6–25	4	1

=== Division Two ===
==== Most runs ====
Player	Team	Matches	Innings	Runs	Average	HS	100s	50s
Luke Wells	Sussex	12	22	1292	64.60	258	4	4
Daryl Mitchell	Worcestershire	14	26	1266	55.04	161	7	3
Joe Denly	Kent	13	23	1165	55.48	227	4	5
Mark Cosgrove	Leicestershire	12	23	1112	48.35	188	2	6
Paul Collingwood	Durham	14	24	1087	49.41	177	3	5

==== Most wickets ====
Players	Team	Matches	Overs	Wickets	Average	BBI	5w	10w
Joe Leach	Worcestershire	14	397.5	69	19.39	5–32	4	1
Darren Stevens	Kent	12	395.4	62	18.08	8–75	7	0
Jofra Archer	Sussex	13	475.1	61	25.30	7–67	4	1
Liam Norwell	Gloucestershire	11	321	59	17.39	8–43	5	2
Michael Hogan	Glamorgan	12	370.4	50	20.88	6–43	3	1
