= George Harding =

George Harding may refer to:

- George Harding (British Army officer) (1788–1860), British general
- George Harding (cricketer) (born 1996), English cricketer
- George C. Harding, American architect of Pittsfield, Massachusetts
- George Edward Harding (1843–1907), American architect in New York City
- George Frederick Harding (1858–1927), British rugby player
- George M. Harding (1827–1910), American architect of Portland, Maine
- George Matthews Harding (1882–1959), war artist, trained as an architect
- George Perfect Harding (died 1853), English portrait-painter and copyist
- George Rogers Harding (1838–1895), Queensland judge and the founder of St John's Wood, Brisbane
- George Tryon Harding (1843–1928), American physician, father of Warren G. Harding

== See also ==
- Georg Harding (born 1981), Austrian footballer
- George Hardinge (1743–1816), English judge
- George Nicholas Hardinge (1781–1808), Royal Navy officer
