= Harry White (cricketer, born 1995) =

English cricketer

Personal information
- Full name: Harry John White
- Born: 19 February 1995 (age 31); Derby, England
- Batting: Right-handed
- Bowling: Left-arm medium

Domestic team information
- Years: Team
- 2015–2016: Derbyshire
- Only First-class: 23 July 2015 Derbyshire v Australians

Career statistics
Competition	First-class
Matches	1
Runs scored	3
Batting average	3.00
100s/50s	0/0
Top score	3
Balls bowled	144
Wickets	2
Bowling average	58.00
5 wickets in innings	0
10 wickets in match	0
Best bowling	2/85
Catches/stumpings	0/–
- Source: ESPNcricinfo, 5 April 2017

Harry White (born 19 February 1995) is an English cricketer. He made his first-class debut for Derbyshire against the Australians on 23 July 2015.
