= Australian cricket team in England and Ireland in 2015 =

The Australia national cricket team toured England from June to September 2015 for a five-match Test series, five One Day International (ODI) matches and one Twenty20 International (T20I). The Test series was for the Ashes. They also played two four-day and two three-day first-class matches against English county sides. Australia also played one ODI against Ireland in Belfast.

== England ==
Australian cricket team in England in 2015
	Australia	England
- Dates: 25 June 2015 – 13 September 2015
Captains	Michael Clarke (Tests); Steve Smith (ODIs and T20Is)	Alastair Cook (Tests); Eoin Morgan (ODIs and T20Is)

Test series
- Result: England won the 5-match series 3–2
Most runs	Steven Smith (508)	Joe Root (460)
Most wickets	Mitchell Starc (18)	Stuart Broad (21)
- Player of the series: Chris Rogers (Aus) and Joe Root (Eng); Compton–Miller Medal: Joe Root (Eng)

One Day International series
- Results: Australia won the 5-match series 3–2
Most runs	George Bailey (218)	Eoin Morgan (278)
Most wickets	Pat Cummins (12)	Adil Rashid (7)
- Player of the series: Mitchell Marsh (Aus)

Twenty20 International series
- Results: England won the 1-match series 1–0
Most runs	Steve Smith (90)	Eoin Morgan (74)
Most wickets	Pat Cummins (2)	David Willey (2)
- Player of the series: Moeen Ali (Eng)

=== Squads ===
On 31 March 2015, Australia announced a 17-man touring party for the Ashes series. England announced their squad for the first Test on 1 July. Australia fast-bowler Ryan Harris announced his retirement from cricket days before the start of the series, due to an ongoing knee injury. He was subsequently replaced by New South Wales fast bowler Pat Cummins. On 12 August 2015, Australia announced a 14-man squad for the ODI series, with Steve Smith captaining the team. England announced their squads for the T20 and ODI series on 24 August.

Tests		ODIs		T20Is	
Australia	England	Australia	England	Australia	England
Michael Clarke (c); Steve Smith (vc); Brad Haddin (wk); Fawad Ahmed; Pat Cummins^{1}; Josh Hazlewood; ~~Ryan Harris~~; Mitchell Johnson; Nathan Lyon; Mitchell Marsh; Shaun Marsh; Peter Nevill (wk); Chris Rogers; Peter Siddle; Mitchell Starc; Adam Voges; David Warner; Shane Watson	Alastair Cook (c); Joe Root (vc); Moeen Ali; James Anderson; Jonny Bairstow ^{2}; Gary Ballance; Ian Bell; Stuart Broad; Jos Buttler (wk); Steven Finn; Mark Footitt ^{3}; Adam Lyth; Liam Plunkett ^{3}; Adil Rashid; Ben Stokes; Mark Wood	Steve Smith (c); David Warner (vc); Ashton Agar; George Bailey; Joe Burns; Nathan Coulter-Nile; Pat Cummins; Aaron Finch^{5}; Peter Handscomb^{5}; John Hastings^{5}; Glenn Maxwell; Mitchell Marsh; James Pattinson; Mitchell Starc; Marcus Stoinis; Matthew Wade (wk); Shane Watson	Eoin Morgan (c); Moeen Ali; Jonny Bairstow(wk) ^{4}; Sam Billings; Jos Buttler (wk); Steven Finn; Alex Hales; Liam Plunkett; Adil Rashid; Jason Roy; Ben Stokes; James Taylor; Reece Topley; David Willey; Chris Woakes; Mark Wood	Steve Smith (c); David Warner (vc); Ashton Agar; George Bailey; Cameron Boyce; Joe Burns; Nathan Coulter-Nile; Pat Cummins; Mitchell Marsh; Glenn Maxwell; James Pattinson; Mitchell Starc; Marcus Stoinis; Matthew Wade (wk); Shane Watson	Eoin Morgan (c); Moeen Ali; Sam Billings; Jos Buttler (wk); Steven Finn; Alex Hales; Adil Rashid; Jason Roy; Ben Stokes; Reece Topley; James Vince; David Willey; Chris Woakes

^{1} Cummins replaced Ryan Harris, who retired prior to the start of the series due to his knee injury.
^{2} Bairstow replaced Gary Ballance in the squad for the third Test.
^{3} Plunkett and Footitt replaced James Anderson in the squad for the fourth Test. Anderson returned to the squad in place of Footitt for the fifth Test.
^{4} Bairstow replaced Jos Buttler in the squad for the third ODI.
^{5}Aaron Finch replaced David Warner in the squad for the third ODI, after Warner retired hurt with a thumb fracture. The next day, Peter Handscomb and John Hastings were called into the side in place of the injured Nathan Coulter-Nile and Shane Watson, who announced his retirement from Test Cricket.

=== Tour matches ===
==== First-class: Kent v Australians ====
25–28 June 2015
Scorecard

Australians	v	Kent
507/8d (124.4 overs); Shaun Marsh 114 (196); Matt Hunn 5/99 (27 overs)		280 (80.2 overs); Rob Key 87 (108); Mitchell Johnson 4/56 (18 overs)
322/4d (62 overs); Mitchell Marsh 101 (94); Adam Riley 3/114 (19 overs)		294 (58.4 overs); Daniel Bell-Drummond 127 (112); Steven Smith 3/54 (5.4 overs)

Australians won by 255 runs
St Lawrence Ground, Canterbury
Umpires: Ben Debenham (Eng) and Nigel Llong (Eng)

- Kent won the toss and elected to field.

==== First-class: Essex v Australians ====
1–4 July 2015
Scorecard

Australians	v	Essex
562 (111 overs); Mitchell Marsh 169 (188); Jamie Porter 3/97 (22 overs)		414 (91.2 overs); Tom Westley 144 (209); Mitchell Starc 6/51 (20.2 overs)
221 (72.4 overs); Michael Clarke 77 (131); Jamie Porter 3/42 (15.4 overs)		200 (48.4 overs); Ryan ten Doeschate 61 (102); Josh Hazlewood 4/42 (8 overs)

Australians won by 169 runs
County Ground, Chelmsford
Umpires: Martin Bodenham (Eng) and Graham Lloyd (Eng)

- Essex won the toss and elected to field.

==== First-class: Derbyshire v Australians ====
23–25 July 2015
Scorecard

Australians	v	Derbyshire
413/9d (90 overs); David Warner 101 (108); Will Davis 3/63 (15 overs)		259 (82.3 overs); Tony Palladino 82 (68); Mitchell Marsh 4/41 (15 overs)
95/1 (24.1 overs); Michael Clarke 44* (74)

Match drawn
County Ground, Derby
Umpires: Chris Gaffaney (NZ) and Tom Lungley (Eng)

- Australians won the toss and elected to bat.
- Will Davis and Harry White (both Derbs) made their first-class debuts.

==== First-class: Northamptonshire v Australians ====
14–16 August 2015
Scorecard

Northamptonshire	v	Australians
396 (90.4 overs); Steven Crook 142* (96); Mitchell Marsh 4/56 (14 overs)		312/9d (89 overs); Pat Cummins 82* (113); Steven Crook 3/38 (12 overs)

Match drawn
County Ground, Northampton
Umpires: Jeff Evans (Eng) and Chris Watts (Eng)

- Australians won the toss and elected to field.
- Due to rain, there was no play on day 1, and the toss was at the start of day 2.
- Richard Gleeson and George Munsey (both Northants) made their first-class debuts.

=== Test series ===
==== First Test ====
8–12 July
Scorecard

England; 430 (102.1 overs) & 289 (70.1 overs)	v	Australia; 308 (84.5 overs) & 242 (70.3 overs)

England won by 169 runs
Sophia Gardens, Cardiff

==== Second Test ====
16–20 July
Scorecard

Australia; 566/8d (149 overs) & 254/2d (49 overs)	v	England; 312 (90.1 overs) & 103 (37 overs)

Australia won by 405 runs
Lord's, London

==== Third Test ====
29 July – 2 August
Scorecard

Australia; 136 (36.4 overs) & 265 (79.1 overs)	v	England; 281 (67.1 overs) & 124/2 (32.1 overs)

England won by 8 wickets
Edgbaston, Birmingham

==== Fourth Test ====
6–10 August
Scorecard

Australia; 60 (18.3 overs) & 253 (72.4 overs)	v	England; 391/9d (85.2 overs)

England won by an innings and 78 runs
Trent Bridge, Nottingham

==== Fifth Test ====
20–24 August
Scorecard

Australia; 481 (125.1 overs)	v	England; 149 (48.4 overs) & 286 (101.4 overs) (f/o)

Australia won by an innings and 46 runs
The Oval, London

=== T20I series ===
==== Only T20I ====
31 August 2015
15:00
Scorecard

England; 182/5 (20 overs)	v	Australia; 177/8 (20 overs)
Eoin Morgan 74 (39); Pat Cummins 2/25 (4 overs)		Steve Smith 90 (53); David Willey 2/34 (4 overs)

England won by 5 runs
Sophia Gardens, Cardiff
Umpires: Michael Gough (Eng) and Tim Robinson (Eng)
Player of the match: Moeen Ali (Eng)

- Australia won the toss and elected to field.
- Marcus Stoinis (Aus) and Reece Topley (Eng) made their T20I debuts.

=== ODI series ===
==== 1st ODI ====
3 September 2015
14:00 (D/N)
Scorecard

Australia; 305/6 (50 overs)	v	England; 246 (45.3 overs)
Matthew Wade 71* (50); Adil Rashid 4/59 (10 overs)		Jason Roy 67 (64); Nathan Coulter-Nile 2/39 (8 overs); Shane Watson 2/39 (8 overs)

Australia won by 59 runs
Rose Bowl, Southampton
Umpires: Michael Gough (Eng) and Joel Wilson (WI)
Player of the match: Matthew Wade (Aus)

- Australia won the toss and elected to bat.

==== 2nd ODI ====
5 September 2015
10:30
Scorecard

Australia; 309/7 (49 overs)	v	England; 245 (42.3 overs)
Steve Smith 70 (87); Ben Stokes 3/60 (9 overs)		Eoin Morgan 85 (87); Pat Cummins 4/56 (8.3 overs)

Australia won by 64 runs
Lord's, London
Umpires: Kumar Dharmasena (SL) and Tim Robinson (Eng)
Player of the match: Mitchell Marsh (Aus)

- England won the toss and elected to field.
- A wet outfield delayed the start of the match and the game was reduced to 49 overs per side.
- Ben Stokes (Eng) became the sixth person to be given out obstructing the field in an ODI match.
- Shane Watson (Aus) played his last ODI.

==== 3rd ODI ====
8 September 2015
14:00 (D/N)
Scorecard

England; 300/8 (50 overs)	v	Australia; 207 (44 overs)
James Taylor 101 (114); Pat Cummins 2/50 (10 overs)		Aaron Finch 53 (60); Moeen Ali 3/32 (10 overs)

England won by 93 runs
Old Trafford, Manchester
Umpires: Rob Bailey (Eng) and Joel Wilson (WI)
Player of the match: James Taylor (Eng)

- England won the toss and elected to bat.
- Ashton Agar (Aus) made his ODI debut.

==== 4th ODI ====
11 September 2015
10:30
Scorecard

Australia; 299/7 (50 overs)	v	England; 304/7 (48.2 overs)
Glenn Maxwell 85 (64); David Willey 3/51 (8 overs)		Eoin Morgan 92 (92); Pat Cummins 4/49 (10 overs)

England won by 3 wickets
Headingley, Leeds
Umpires: Kumar Dharmasena (SL) and Michael Gough (Eng)
Player of the match: Eoin Morgan (Eng)

- Australia won the toss and elected to bat.
- Marcus Stoinis (Aus) made his ODI debut.

==== 5th ODI ====
13 September 2015
10:30
Scorecard

England; 138 (33 overs)	v	Australia; 140/2 (24.2 overs)
Ben Stokes 42 (51); Mitchell Marsh 4/27 (6 overs)		Aaron Finch 70* (64); David Willey 1/13 (6 overs)

Australia won by 8 wickets
Old Trafford, Manchester
Umpires: Rob Bailey (Eng) and Joel Wilson (WI)
Player of the match: Mitchell Marsh (Aus)

- England won the toss and elected to bat.
- Reece Topley (Eng) made his ODI debut.

== Ireland ==
Australian cricket team in Ireland in 2015
	Australia	Ireland
- Date: 27 August 2015
Captains	Steve Smith	William Porterfield

One Day International series
- Results: Australia won the 1-match series 1–0
Most runs	David Warner (84)	Niall O'Brien (45)
Most wickets	Nathan Coulter-Nile (3)	Tim Murtagh (2)
- Player of the series: David Warner (Aus)

=== Squads ===
ODIs
Australia	Ireland
Steve Smith (c); Ashton Agar; George Bailey; Joe Burns; Nathan Coulter-Nile; Pat Cummins; Glenn Maxwell; Mitchell Marsh; James Pattinson; Mitchell Starc; Marcus Stoinis; Matthew Wade (wk); Shane Watson; David Warner	William Porterfield (c); Andy Balbirnie; George Dockrell; Ed Joyce; Andy McBrine; John Mooney; Tim Murtagh; Kevin O'Brien; Niall O'Brien; Paul Stirling; Stuart Thompson; Gary Wilson (wk); Craig Young

=== ODI series ===
==== Only ODI ====
27 August 2015
10:45
Scorecard

Australia; 222/6 (40.2 overs)	v	Ireland; 157 (23.4 overs)
David Warner 84 (80); Tim Murtagh 2/45 (10 overs)		Niall O'Brien 45 (53); Nathan Coulter-Nile 3/13 (4.4 overs)

Australia won by 23 runs (DLS method)
Civil Service Cricket Club Ground, Stormont, Belfast
Umpires: Mark Hawthorne (Ire) and Joel Wilson (WI)
Player of the match: David Warner (Aus)

- Australia won the toss and elected to bat.
- The start was delayed due to a wet outfield and the match was reduced to 47 overs per side.
- Rain stopped play in 32nd over of Australia's innings and reduced the game to 46 overs per side, and again rain stopped at 40.2 overs then Australia's innings ended.
- Ireland's revised target was 195 in 27 overs, per the DLS method, but rain interrupted play during Ireland's innings at 6.2 overs. The match was reduced to 24 overs and the target was set at 181 runs.
- Joe Burns (Aus) made his ODI debut.
