= George Panayi =

English cricketer

Personal information
- Full name: George David Panayi
- Born: 23 September 1997 (age 29); Enfield, Middlesex, England
- Batting: Right-handed
- Bowling: Right-arm fast-medium

Domestic team information
- Years: Team
- 2017–2019: Warwickshire (squad no. 33)
- First-class debut: 26 June 2017 Warwickshire v Lancashire
- List A debut: 17 June 2018 Warwickshire v West Indies A

Career statistics
Competition	FC	List A
Matches	2	8
Runs scored	17	90
Batting average	5.66	30.00
100s/50s	–/–	–/–
Top score	16	26
Balls bowled	231	360
Wickets	4	5
Bowling average	35.25	77.80
5 wickets in innings	–	–
10 wickets in match	–	–
Best bowling	3/41	2/44
Catches/stumpings	0/–	0/–
- Source: Cricinfo, 2 June 2024

George David Panayi (born 23 September 1997) is an English cricketer. He played for Warwickshire.

== Early life ==
Panayi was born in Enfield, London, and completed his schooling at Shrewsbury School at Birmingham, where he captained the school cricket team. In 2016 and 2017 he played for the England under-19 cricket team.

== Career ==
In June 2017, he signed his first professional contract with Warwickshire, At the age of 19, he made his first-class debut on 26 June 2017 for Warwickshire against Lancashire as a part of 2017 County Championship. He made his List A debut for Warwickshire against West Indies A in a tri-series warm-up match on 17 June 2018. He was released at the end of the 2019 season.
