= William Fazackerley =

English cricketer (born 1998)

Will Fazackerley
Personal information
- Full name: William N Fazackerley
- Born: 19 June 1998 (age 28); Guernsey
- Batting: Right-handed
- Bowling: Right-arm fast-medium

Domestic team information
- Years: Team
- 2017–2018: Leicestershire (squad no. 35)
- Only First-class: 5 July 2017 Leics v Sussex

Career statistics
Competition	First-class
Matches	1
Runs scored	0
Batting average	0.00
100s/50s	0/0
Top score	0
Balls bowled	72
Wickets	1
Bowling average	83.00
5 wickets in innings	0
10 wickets in match	0
Best bowling	1/32
Catches/stumpings	0/–
- Source: Cricinfo, 23 May 2018

William N Fazackerley (born 19 June 1998) is a former English cricketer. He made his first-class debut for Leicestershire in the 2017 County Championship on 5 July 2017. Fazackerley retired from cricket in January 2018.
