= Dieter Klein =

German cricketer

Personal information
- Full name: Dieter Klein
- Born: 31 October 1988 (age 38); Lichtenburg, Transvaal Province, South Africa
- Batting: Right-handed
- Bowling: Left-arm fast-medium
- Role: Bowler

International information
- National side: Germany
- T20I debut (cap 21): 8 March 2020 v Spain
- Last T20I: 28 July 2023 v Italy

Domestic team information
- Years: Team
- 2007/08–2015/16: North West
- 2012/13–2013/14: Highveld Lions
- 2016–2021: Leicestershire (squad no. 77)

Career statistics
Competition	T20I	FC	LA	T20
Matches	23	71	36	54
Runs scored	123	1,455	223	203
Batting average	10.25	17.96	13.93	8.82
100s/50s	0/0	0/6	0/0	0/0
Top score	31*	94	46	31*
Balls bowled	528	10,144	1,757	1,048
Wickets	28	225	53	52
Bowling average	19.14	29.44	29.28	23.82
5 wickets in innings	0	10	1	0
10 wickets in match	0	1	0	0
Best bowling	3/31	8/72	5/35	3/27
Catches/stumpings	8/–	19/–	2/–	17/–
- Source: CricInfo, 17 August 2023

Dieter Klein (born 31 October 1988) is a German cricketer who most recently played for Leicestershire County Cricket Club. Primarily a left-arm fast-medium bowler, he also bats right handed.

As Klein holds a German passport, he is not considered an overseas player in English domestic cricket. In February 2019, Klein attended a training camp with the German national cricket team, with a view to help Germany qualify via the Regional Finals of the 2018–19 ICC World Twenty20 Europe Qualifier group for the 2020 ICC T20 World Cup. In May 2019, he was named in Germany's squad for the Regional Finals of the 2018–19 ICC T20 World Cup Europe Qualifier tournament in Guernsey. He made his T20I debut for Germany against Spain on 8 March 2020.

In September 2021, he was named in Germany's T20I squad for the Regional Final of the 2021 ICC Men's T20 World Cup Europe Qualifier tournament. In January 2022, he was named in Germany's team for the 2022 ICC Men's T20 World Cup Global Qualifier A tournament in Oman.
