= George Harding (cricketer) =

English cricketer (born 1996)

Personal information
- Full name: George Harvey Idris Harding
- Born: 12 October 1996 (age 30); Poole, Dorset, England
- Batting: Right-handed
- Bowling: Slow left-arm orthodox
- Role: Bowler

Domestic team information
- Years: Team
- 2017–2019: Durham (squad no. 39)
- First-class debut: 26 May 2017 Durham v Glamorgan
- List A debut: 3 May 2017 Durham v Yorkshire

Career statistics
Competition	FC	LA
Matches	3	8
Runs scored	43	23
Batting average	10.75	–
100s/50s	0/0	0/0
Top score	36	18*
Balls bowled	462	438
Wickets	6	6
Bowling average	53.50	71.83
5 wickets in innings	0	0
10 wickets in match	0	0
Best bowling	4/111	2/52
Catches/stumpings	0/–	5/–
- Source: ESPNcricinfo, 9 June 2019

George Harvey Idris Harding (born 12 October 1996) is an English cricketer. He made his List A debut for Durham in the 2017 Royal London One-Day Cup on 3 May 2017. He made his first-class debut for Durham in the 2017 County Championship on 26 May 2017.
