= Will Davis (cricketer) =

English cricketer

Personal information
- Full name: William Samuel Davis
- Born: 6 March 1996 (age 30); Stafford, Staffordshire, England
- Batting: Right-handed
- Bowling: Right-arm fast-medium
- Role: Bowler

Domestic team information
- Years: Team
- 2015–2018: Derbyshire (squad no. 44)
- 2019–2023: Leicestershire (squad no. 44)
- First-class debut: 23 July 2015 Derbyshire v Australians
- List A debut: 12 June 2016 Derbyshire v Yorkshire

Career statistics
Competition	FC	LA	T20
Matches	39	10	30
Runs scored	539	48	20
Batting average	14.97	16.00	4.00
100s/50s	0/1	0/0	0/0
Top score	58	15*	7*
Balls bowled	5,560	411	431
Wickets	96	10	20
Bowling average	34.78	43.30	33.05
5 wickets in innings	2	0	0
10 wickets in match	0	0	0
Best bowling	7/146	2/40	3/24
Catches/stumpings	7/–	2/–	8/–
- Source: CricketArchive, 30 September 2023

William Samuel Davis (born 6 March 1996) is an English cricketer. He made his first-class debut for Derbyshire against the Australians on 23 July 2015. Davis left Derbyshire at the end of the 2018 season to join Leicestershire. He made his Twenty20 debut on 1 May 2019, for Leicestershire against the touring Pakistan team.
