= Sukhjit Singh (cricketer) =

Indian-born cricketer (born 1996)

Personal information
- Full name: Sukhjit Singh
- Born: 3 May 1996 (age 30); Manolian, Punjab, India
- Height: 5 ft 10 in (1.78 m)
- Batting: Left-handed
- Bowling: Slow left-arm orthodox
- Role: Bowler

Domestic team information
- Years: Team
- 2017–2018: Warwickshire (squad no. 58)
- First-class debut: 2 April 2017 Warwickshire v Oxford MCCU

Career statistics
Competition	First-class
Matches	6
Runs scored	18
Batting average	3.00
100s/50s	0/0
Top score	16*
Balls bowled	916
Wickets	17
Bowling average	26.58
5 wickets in innings	2
10 wickets in match	0
Best bowling	6/144
Catches/stumpings	1/–
- Source: ESPNcricinfo, 4 April 2018

Sukhjit Singh (born 3 May 1996) is an Indian-born first-class cricketer. He made his first-class debut on 2 April 2017 for Warwickshire against Oxford MCCU as part of the Marylebone Cricket Club University fixtures.
