= 2019 Cricket World Cup final =

Cricket World Cup final

2019 Cricket World Cup Final
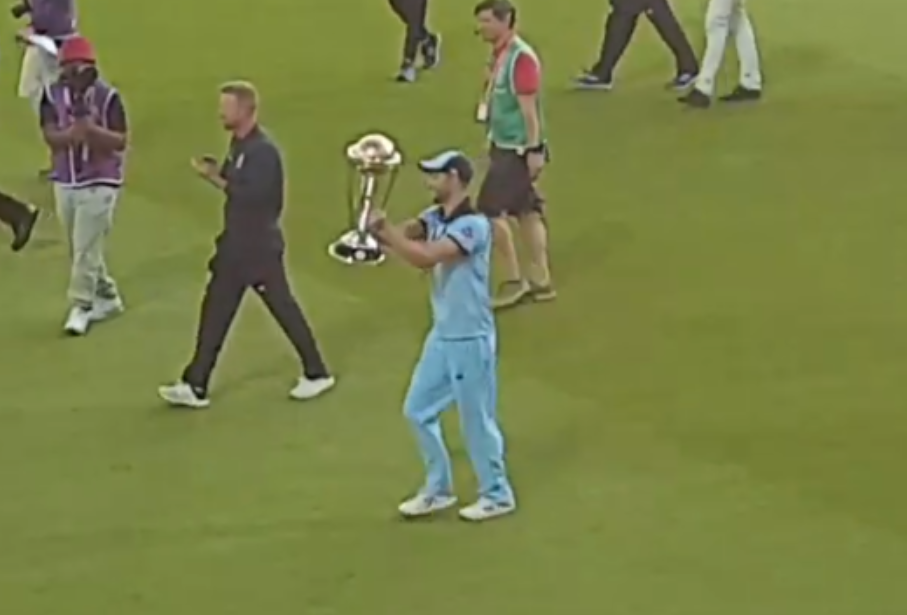
- England captain Eoin Morgan with the trophy
- Event: 2019 Cricket World Cup
New Zealand	England
(New Zealand)	(England)
241/8	241
50 Overs	50 Overs
&	&
15/1	15/0
Super Over	Super Over
- England won by boundary count
- Date: 14 July 2019
- Venue: Lord's, London
- Player of the match: Ben Stokes (Eng)
- Umpires: Kumar Dharmasena (SL) and Marais Erasmus (SA)

The 2019 Cricket World Cup Final was a One Day International cricket match played at Lord's in London, on 14 July 2019 to determine the winner of the 2019 Cricket World Cup. It was contested by the runners-up from the previous tournament, New Zealand, and the host nation, England. It was the fifth time Lord's had hosted the Cricket World Cup Final, the most of any ground.

The two teams were tied on 241 runs at the end of the match, resulting in a Super Over being played to break the tie. On the final ball of New Zealand's Super Over, after equalling the 15 runs England managed in their over, Martin Guptill attempted to score the winning run but was run out by Jason Roy and Jos Buttler, meaning the Super Over was also tied. England won on the boundary count-back rule, having scored 26 boundaries to New Zealand's 17, thus becoming Cricket World Cup winners for the first time.

It was the first time a One Day International final match required a Super Over, and subsequently the first and only time it had been decided by a boundary count. The match has been described as one of the greatest and most dramatic in the history of sport, with some analysts describing it as the greatest match in the history of cricket.

== Background ==
The 2019 Cricket World Cup started on 30 May and was hosted by England and Wales. Ten teams played each other once in a round-robin format with the top four teams going through to the semi-finals. Fourth-placed New Zealand beat group winners India in the first semi-final, and England, who finished third in the group, defeated second-placed Australia in the second.

England played in their first final in 27 years, their last appearance coming in 1992, when they were defeated by Pakistan at the Melbourne Cricket Ground. Their other appearances in the final were in 1979 against the West Indies at Lord's and 1987 against Australia at Eden Gardens. Despite playing in the second-highest number of finals in the World Cup after Australia, they were yet to win the trophy. New Zealand played in their second final, and also their second in a row. They previously played in the 2015 final but were beaten by Australia.

When England reached the final, demand increased greatly for it to be shown on a free-to-air television channel in the United Kingdom. Rights holders Sky Sports agreed to allow Channel 4, who had the rights to broadcast evening highlights of the tournament, to carry the final in a simulcast (England cricket matches are not compulsory events requiring free-to-air broadcast). However, due to an existing commitment by Channel 4 to cover the 2019 British Grand Prix, the coverage switched to their sister channel More4 during the motor racing, returning to Channel 4 after the Grand Prix had finished. It was the first time an England international match had been broadcast on free-to-air television in the UK since the 2005 Ashes series.

Whichever team won the match would become the first new winner of the World Cup since Sri Lanka's victory in 1996. It was also the first world final with a guaranteed new winner since 1992.

== Road to the final ==
=== Route to the final ===
England		Round	New Zealand
Opponent	Result	Group stage	Opponent	Result
South Africa	England won by 104 runs	Match 1	Sri Lanka	New Zealand won by 10 wickets
Pakistan	Pakistan won by 14 runs	Match 2	Bangladesh	New Zealand won by 2 wickets
Bangladesh	England won by 106 runs	Match 3	Afghanistan	New Zealand won by 7 wickets
West Indies	England won by 8 wickets	Match 4	India	Match abandoned
Afghanistan	England won by 150 runs	Match 5	South Africa	New Zealand won by 4 wickets
Sri Lanka	Sri Lanka won by 20 runs	Match 6	West Indies	New Zealand won by 5 runs
Australia	Australia won by 64 runs	Match 7	Pakistan	Pakistan won by 6 wickets
India	England won by 31 runs	Match 8	Australia	Australia won by 86 runs
New Zealand	England won by 119 runs	Match 9	England	England won by 119 runs
Group stage 3rd Place: Pos / Team / P / W / L / T / NR / Pts / NRR / Qualification; 3 / England / 9 / 6 / 3 / 0 / 0 / 12 / 1.152 / Advance to semi-finals		Final group standings	Group stage 4th Place: Pos / Team / P / W / L / T / NR / Pts / NRR / Qualification; 4 / New Zealand / 9 / 5 / 3 / 0 / 1 / 11 / 0.175 / Advance to semi-finals
Opponent	Result	Knockout stage	Opponent	Result
Australia	England won by 8 wickets	Semi-finals	India	New Zealand won by 18 runs

=== New Zealand ===
New Zealand retained the majority of the team that reached their maiden World Cup Final as co-hosts in 2015, although Kane Williamson took on the captaincy following Brendon McCullum's retirement. They finished level on 11 points with Pakistan in the round-robin stage (five wins, three losses and one no result after their match against India was interrupted by rain), but took fourth place by virtue of a better net run rate than Pakistan.

In the semi-finals, they were paired with India, who finished first in the round-robin stage. The match was played at Old Trafford in Manchester on 9 July. With New Zealand on 211/5 after 46.1 overs, Williamson having scored 67 and Ross Taylor on the same score at the time, the match was suspended by rain and ultimately play was pushed to the reserve day the next day. Eventually finishing on 239/8, Taylor eventually out for 74, they produced a spirited bowling and fielding performance to leave India 18 runs short. Man of the Match Matt Henry took 3/37, including openers Rohit Sharma and K. L. Rahul caught for just one each and Dinesh Karthik spectacularly caught by James Neesham for 6. Meanwhile, fellow pace bowler Trent Boult had captain Virat Kohli trapped lbw for one and top scorer Ravindra Jadeja caught by Williamson for 77 when a seventh-wicket partnership looked to be swinging the match back in India's favour. Finally, Martin Guptill ran out World Cup-winning captain MS Dhoni for 50 with a direct hit to leave India with just their tail.

=== England ===
England, by contrast, entered as the top-ranked ODI team after director of cricket and former Ashes-winning captain Andrew Strauss helped orchestrate the national team's white-ball revamp following their bowing out in the group stage in 2015. Only a handful of the players who featured in 2019, including Irish-born captain Eoin Morgan, Test captain Joe Root, wicket-keeper Jos Buttler and bowling all-rounder Chris Woakes, were holdovers from that team, though a good number played in the narrow defeat against the West Indies in the 2016 World Twenty20 Final. Morgan was also the lone remaining member of England's 2010 World Twenty20 champion team – England's only ICC world championship going into this final.

Their campaign was nearly derailed after a loss at Lord's to defending champions and arch-rivals Australia left them having to beat both India and New Zealand to guarantee their semi-final spot. They won both games and finished third in the round-robin stage with 12 points (six wins and three losses out of nine matches). They met group runners-up Australia in the second semi-final at Edgbaston on 11 July and soundly defeated them by 8 wickets to progress to the final. Key moments included Woakes having David Warner caught for 9, Jofra Archer trapping captain Aaron Finch lbw for a golden duck, Buttler running out Australian top scorer and former captain Steve Smith through his legs on 85 and Jason Roy's 85 off 65 as England completed their chase with 107 balls to spare.

== Match ==
=== Match officials ===
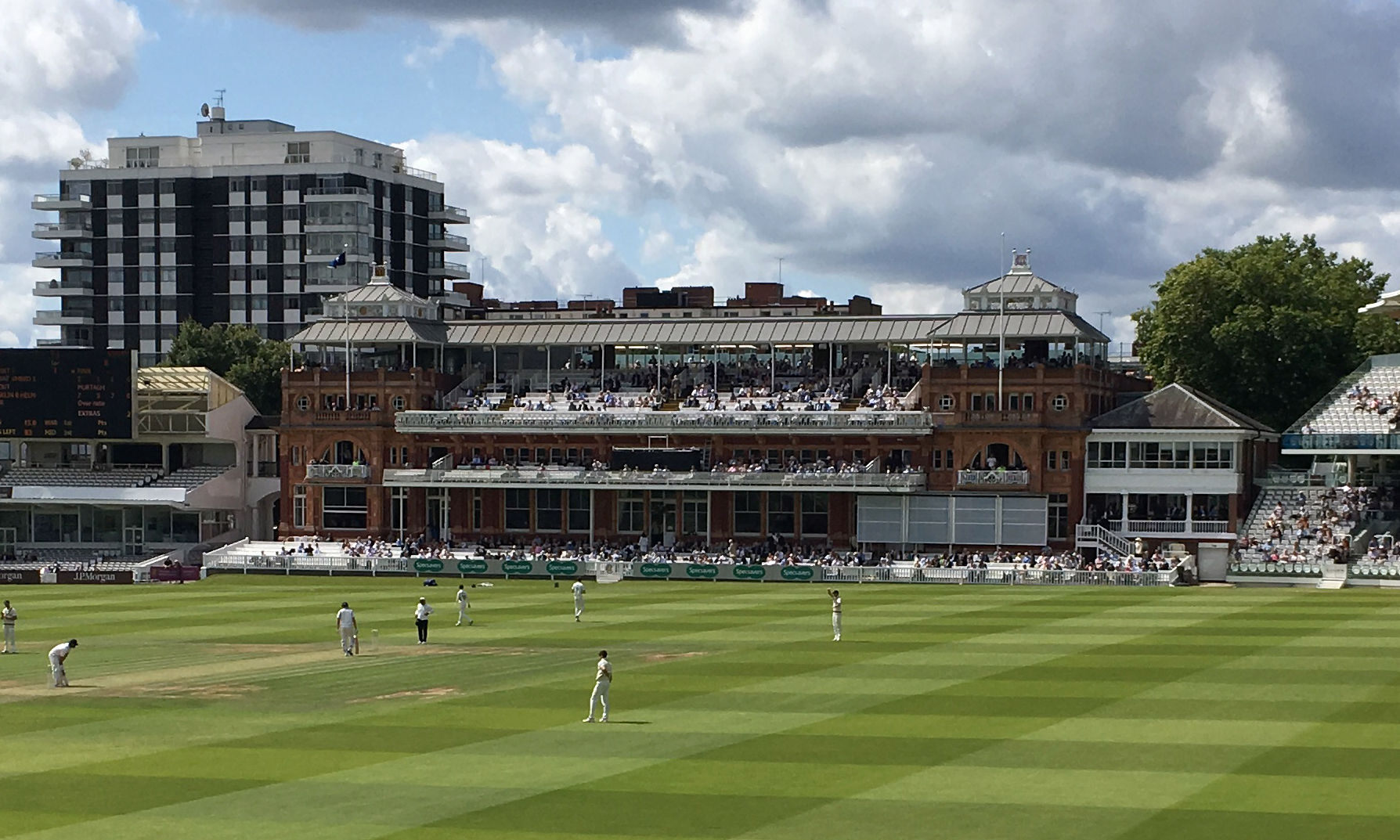
Lord's hosted its fifth Cricket World Cup Final.

On 12 July 2019, the International Cricket Council (ICC) named Sri Lankan Kumar Dharmasena and South African Marais Erasmus as the on-field umpires, with Australian Rod Tucker as the third umpire, Pakistani Aleem Dar as the reserve umpire and Sri Lankan Ranjan Madugalle named as match referee.

- On-field umpires: Kumar Dharmasena (SL) and Marais Erasmus (SA)
- TV umpire: Rod Tucker (Aus)
- Reserve umpire: Aleem Dar (Pak)
- Match referee: Ranjan Madugalle (SL)

=== Teams and toss ===
Both teams remained unchanged from their semi-final matches; New Zealand decided that the line-up that beat India against the odds would work in their favour in the final, while England's Jason Roy avoided suspension after his show of dissent in their semi-final match against Australia to open the batting for the hosts.

Some early rain slightly delayed the toss, with the match starting at 10:45, 15 minutes later than scheduled. It was feared that the rain would interfere with the match, but it cleared up quickly, although the overcast conditions and wet grass changed the dynamic of the toss. New Zealand won the toss and decided to bat first.

=== New Zealand innings ===
Martin Guptill and Henry Nicholls opened the innings for New Zealand, with Nicholls scoring his first half-century of the tournament. A further 30 runs from captain Kane Williamson, and 47 from wicket-keeper Tom Latham, helped New Zealand to a total of 241/8 from their 50 overs. Chris Woakes and Liam Plunkett took three wickets each for the hosts.

=== England innings ===
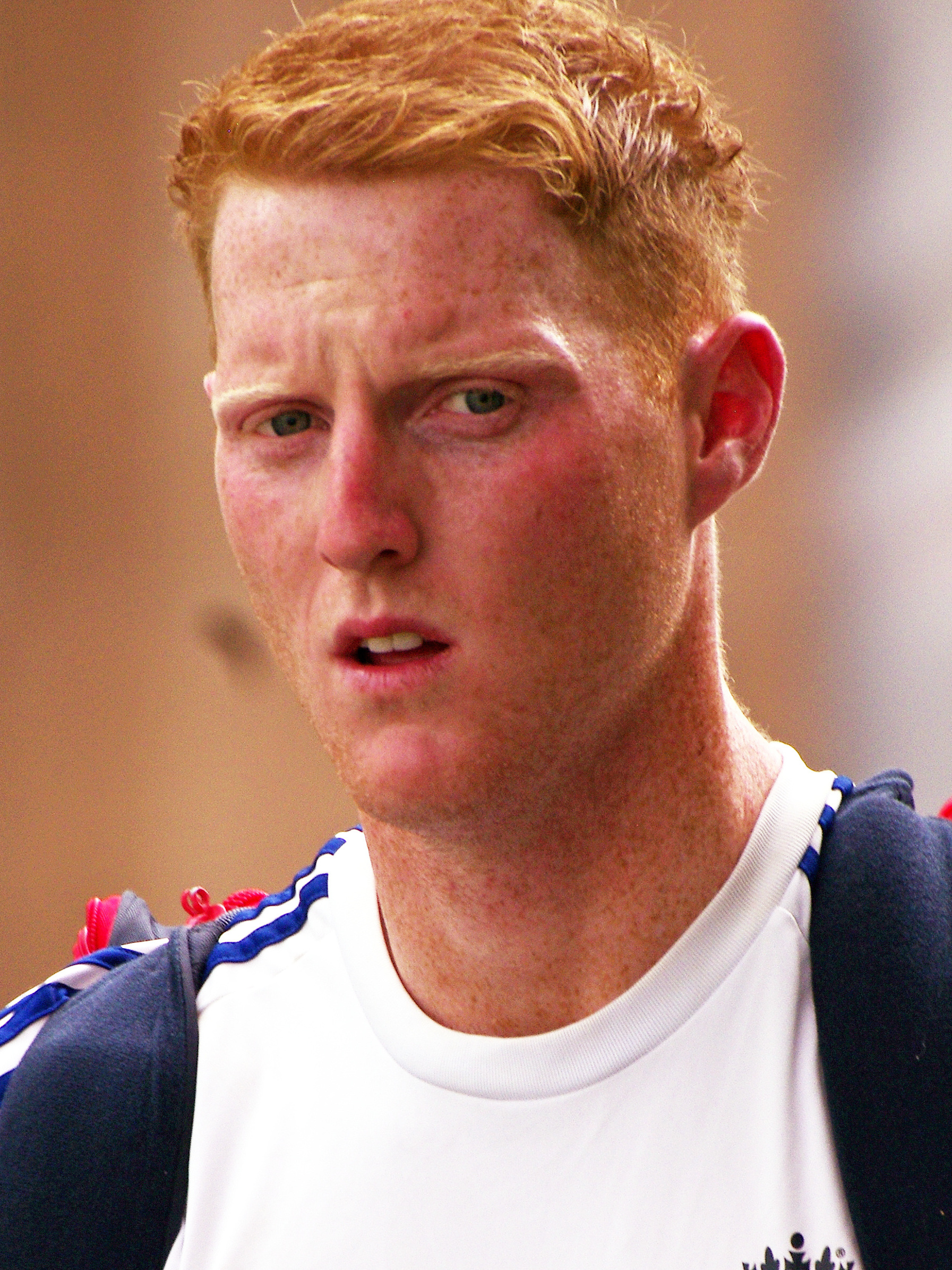
Ben Stokes was named Man of the Match.

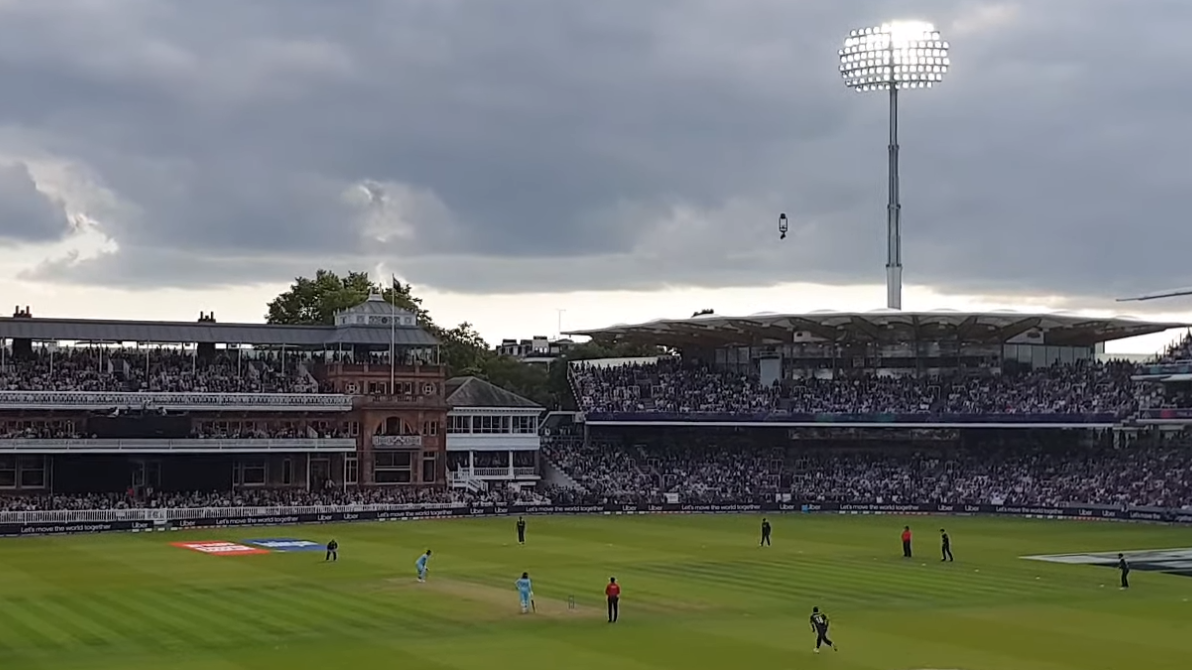
England scored 14 runs in the final over to tie the match.

Defending a middling score, the New Zealand bowlers bowled effectively, hampering England's top order, with only Jonny Bairstow managing more than a start with 36. With the loss of their top order, England fell to 86/4 in the 24th over; however, a century partnership between Ben Stokes and Jos Buttler for the fifth wicket got them back into the game before Buttler was caught. But with five overs to play, England still required another 46 runs and the bottom order were forced to bat more aggressively. Stokes managed to farm the strike and, more crucially, score runs, leaving England needing 15 to win from the final over, two wickets still in hand. After two dot balls, Stokes hit a six into the stands at deep mid-wicket, bringing their score to 233/8.

From the third-last ball of the final over, Stokes drove the ball into mid-wicket. Guptill fielded the ball and threw it back to the striker's end as Stokes was returning to complete a second run; however, as Stokes dived for the crease, the ball deflected off his bat and to the boundary behind the wicket, resulting in four additional runs being added to the two that Stokes had run. Umpire Dharamsena made an error here in awarding six runs. Law 19.8 states that in case of additional runs from overthrow, the run in progress will only be counted if the batsmen had crossed before the throw was made. This was not the case here and the correct decision should have been to award five runs and have Rashid take the strike. The final two deliveries went for a run each, but England lost their last two wickets going for a second run each time.

=== Super Over ===
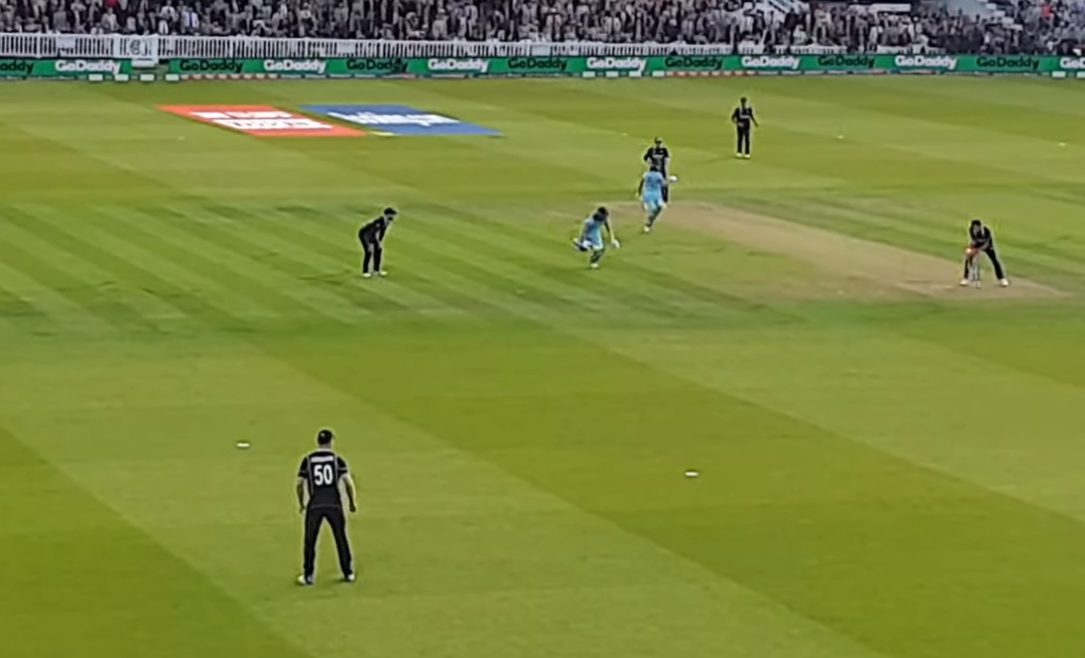
England finished with the same score as New Zealand, sending the game to a Super Over.

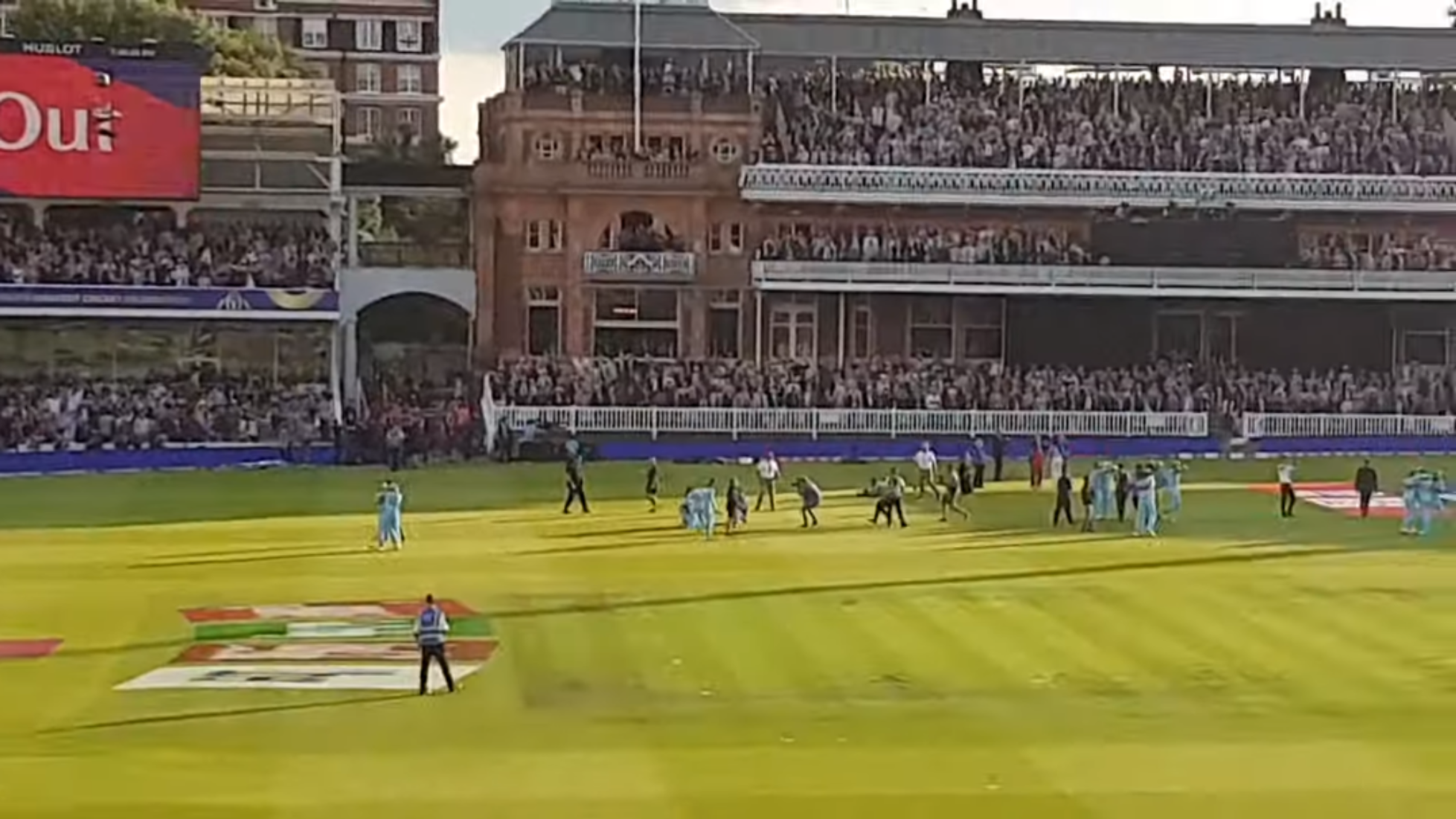
The England team celebrate after running out Martin Guptill in the Super Over.

With the scores tied at 241, the match went to a Super Over. Stokes and Buttler returned to the crease for England to face the bowling of Trent Boult; the pair scored 15 runs without loss, with both batsmen contributing a boundary four. For New Zealand, Guptill and James Neesham went in to face Jofra Archer, needing 16 runs to claim the title. Archer's over started badly, beginning with a wide, and a steady accumulation of runs, along with a six from Neesham off the third ball, left New Zealand needing two from the final delivery. Facing his first ball of the Super Over and the last of the match, Guptill hit the ball to deep mid-wicket and tried to scamper back for the winning run, but Roy's throw in to Buttler was a good one, and Guptill was run out well short of his crease. New Zealand finished with 15 runs, the Super Over tied, but England's superior boundary count (26 to New Zealand's 17) meant they won the World Cup title for the first time in four final appearances. Stokes earned Man of the Match honours with his unbeaten 84, plus eight runs in the Super Over.

This is the moment! It's Archer to Guptill: 2 to win. (Guptill hits the delivery) Guptill's gonna push for 2! They've got to go! It's [the ball] gonna...(Roy fields) Roy's gonna go to the keeper's end...(Buttler takes the throw and downs the wicket) He's got it! England have won the World Cup! By the barest of margins! By the barest of all margins! Absolute ecstasy for England! Agony, agony for New Zealand!

— Ian Smith on the TV broadcast of the final ball

It's come to this. Here's the last ball of the World Cup Final. Archer bowls it – it's clipped away to the leg side. They're going to come back for the second. The throw is picked up, they throw to the wicketkeeper's end...he's run out, is he?! I think he's run out! England think he's run out!...Wait now, listen...(Replay shown, crowd cheers as Guptill shown out) That tells you that England have won the World Cup!

— Jonathan Agnew on Test Match Special's radio broadcast of the final ball on BBC Radio Five Live

=== Match details ===
14 July 2019
10:30
Scorecard

New Zealand; 241/8 (50 overs)	v	England; 241 (50 overs)
Henry Nicholls 55 (77); Chris Woakes 3/37 (9 overs)		Ben Stokes 84* (98); James Neesham 3/43 (7 overs)

Match tied
Lord's, London
Umpires: Kumar Dharmasena (SL) and Marais Erasmus (SA)
Player of the match: Ben Stokes (Eng)

- New Zealand won the toss and elected to bat.
- Super Over: England 15/0, New Zealand 15/1.
- England won on the boundary count back rule (26–17).
- Kane Williamson (NZ) scored the highest number of runs as a captain in a single World Cup series (578).
- Joe Root (Eng) took his 13th catch of the tournament, the most in a single Cricket World Cup.
- This was the first time that a Super Over was used to determine the winner of a One Day International, and was also the first Super Over to finish in a tie.
- England became the third team in succession to win the World Cup at home.
Final scorecard

1st innings

New Zealand batting
Player	Status	Runs	Balls	4s	6s	Strike rate
Martin Guptill	lbw b Woakes	19	18	2	1	105.55
Henry Nicholls	b Plunkett	55	77	4	0	71.42
Kane Williamson	c Buttler b Plunkett	30	53	2	0	56.60
Ross Taylor	lbw b Wood	15	31	0	0	48.38
Tom Latham	c sub (Vince) b Woakes	47	56	2	1	83.92
James Neesham	c Root b Plunkett	19	25	3	0	76.00
Colin de Grandhomme	c sub (Vince) b Woakes	16	28	0	0	57.14
Mitchell Santner	not out	5	9	0	0	55.55
Matt Henry	b Archer	4	2	1	0	200.00
Trent Boult	not out	1	2	0	0	50.00
Lockie Ferguson	did not bat					
Extras	(lb 12, w 17, nb 1)	30				
Total	(8 wickets; 50 overs)	241		14	2	

Fall of wickets: 1/29 (Guptill, 6.2 ov), 2/103 (Williamson, 22.4 ov), 3/118 (Nicholls, 26.5 ov), 4/141 (Taylor, 33.1 ov), 5/173 (Neesham, 39 ov), 6/219 (De Grandhomme, 46.5 ov), 7/232 (Latham, 48.3 ov), 8/240 (Henry, 49.3 ov)

England bowling
Bowler	Overs	Maidens	Runs	Wickets	Econ	Wides	NBs
Chris Woakes	9	0	37	3	4.11	4	2
Jofra Archer	10	0	42	1	4.20	5	0
Liam Plunkett	10	0	42	3	4.20	0	0
Mark Wood	10	1	49	1	4.90	2	0
Adil Rashid	8	0	39	0	4.87	5	0
Ben Stokes	3	0	20	0	6.66	2	0

2nd innings

England batting
Player	Status	Runs	Balls	4s	6s	Strike rate
Jason Roy	c Latham b Henry	17	20	3	0	85.00
Jonny Bairstow	b Ferguson	36	55	7	0	65.45
Joe Root	c Latham b De Grandhomme	7	30	0	0	23.33
Eoin Morgan	c Ferguson b Neesham	9	22	0	0	40.90
Ben Stokes	not out	84	98	5	2	85.71
Jos Buttler	c sub (Southee) b Ferguson	59	60	6	0	98.33
Chris Woakes	c Latham b Ferguson	2	4	0	0	50.00
Liam Plunkett	c Boult b Neesham	10	10	1	0	100.00
Jofra Archer	b Neesham	0	1	0	0	0.00
Adil Rashid	run out (Santner/Boult)	0	0	0	0	0.00
Mark Wood	run out (Neesham/Boult)	0	0	0	0	0.00
Extras	(b 2, lb 3, w 12)	17				
Total	(all out; 50 overs)	241		22	2	

Fall of wickets: 1/28 (Roy, 5.4 ov), 2/59 (Root, 16.3 ov), 3/71 (Bairstow, 19.3 ov), 4/86 (Morgan, 23.1 ov), 5/196 (Buttler, 44.5 ov), 6/203 (Woakes, 46.1 ov), 7/220 (Plunkett, 48.3 ov), 8/227 (Archer, 49 ov), 9/240 (Rashid, 49.5 ov), 10/241 (Wood, 50 ov)

New Zealand bowling
Bowler	Overs	Maidens	Runs	Wickets	Econ	Wides	NBs
Trent Boult	10	0	67	0	6.70	2	0
Matt Henry	10	2	40	1	4.00	0	0
Colin de Grandhomme	10	2	25	1	2.50	1	0
Lockie Ferguson	10	0	50	3	5.00	3	0
James Neesham	7	0	43	3	6.14	1	0
Mitchell Santner	3	0	11	0	3.66	1	0

Super Over

England Super Over
Bowler	(New Zealand) Trent Boult	
Ball	Batsman	Outcome
1	Ben Stokes	3
2	Jos Buttler	1
3	Ben Stokes	4
4	Ben Stokes	1
5	Jos Buttler	2
6	Jos Buttler	4
Total	15/0	

New Zealand Super Over
Bowler	(England) Jofra Archer	
Ball	Batsman	Outcome
1	James Neesham	Wide
2	James Neesham	2
3	James Neesham	6
4	James Neesham	2
5	James Neesham	2
6	James Neesham	1
7	Martin Guptill	1 and W run out (Jason Roy/Jos Buttler)
Total	15/1	

== Post-match and legacy ==
=== Reaction ===
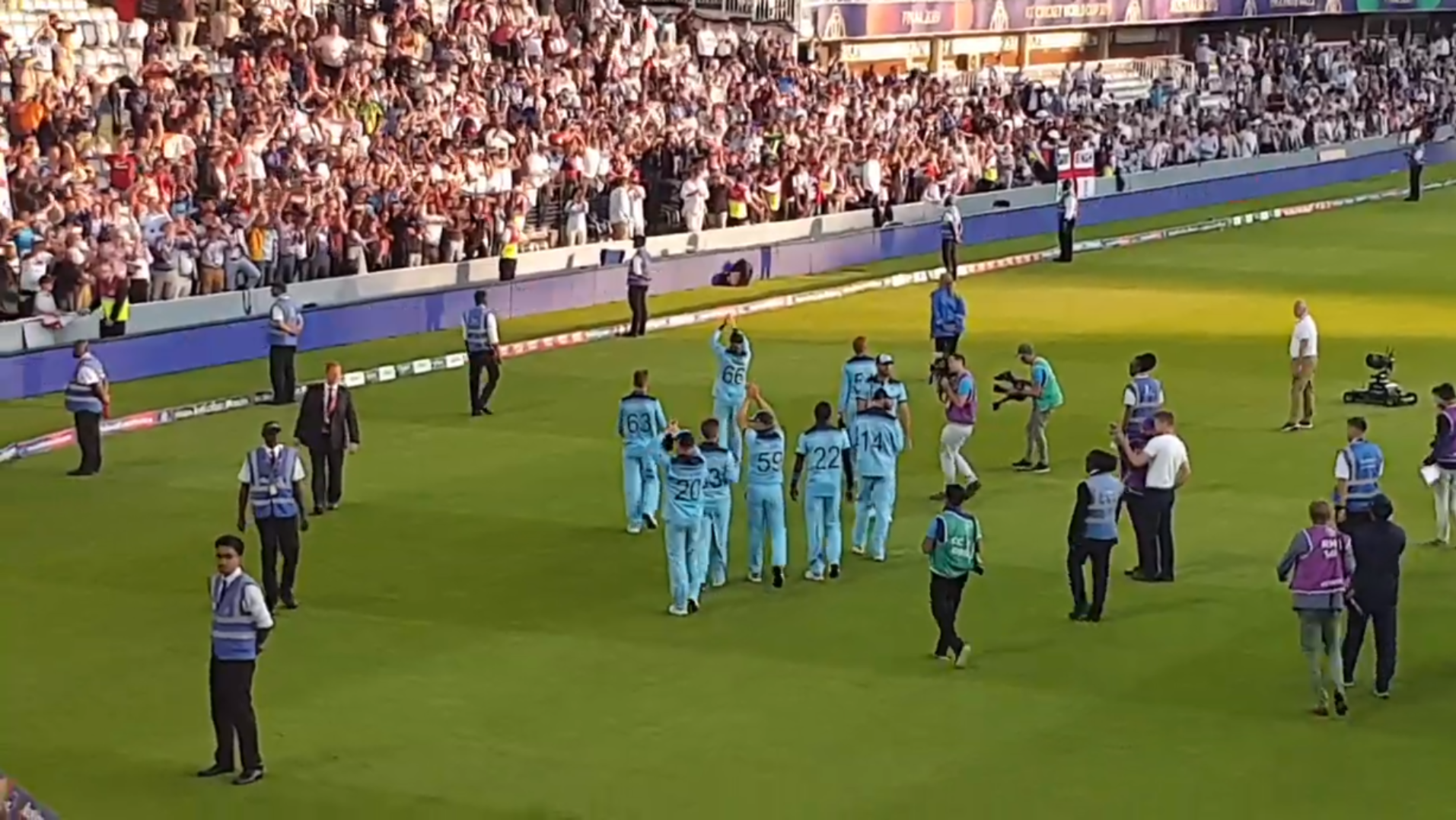
England perform a lap of honour around Lord's after their victory.

The closeness of the match, with scores being level even after the end of the Super Over and England claiming the tie-breaker by having scored more boundaries throughout the match, combined with the dramatic turn of events in the final hour and the fact that it was played as a Cricket World Cup Final, led to many former and active players, analysts and media outlets describing it as the greatest cricket match ever played. Former England one-day bowler Stuart Broad called it "the best white ball game of all time". England players Joe Root and Jonny Bairstow declared the World Cup Final as "the greatest game ever".

The Guardian's live commentator wrote: "That is the most amazing game I have ever seen in my life." The Sydney Morning Herald called it "one of the most dramatic clashes in cricket history", while ABC News referred to it as "the greatest ODI ever played". The headline of The Week was "Super human Ben Stokes drags England to victory in the greatest cricket match". With Novak Djokovic and Roger Federer contesting the Wimbledon Championships' longest ever singles final (which finished during the World Cup Final), and Lewis Hamilton winning the British Grand Prix on the same day, it was referred to as a "golden sporting Sunday".

Umpire Kumar Dharmasena's decision to award England six runs following an overthrow boundary in the final over was criticised by former international umpire Simon Taufel, who said it was an "error in judgment" and a "clear mistake" by the on-field umpires. Law 19.8 of the Laws of Cricket says "If the boundary results from an overthrow or from the wilful act of a fielder, the runs scored shall be: any runs for penalties awarded to either side; the allowance for the boundary; and the runs completed by the batsmen, together with the run in progress if they had already crossed at the instant of the throw or act." As Stokes and Adil Rashid had not crossed at the moment the New Zealand fielder threw the ball, it was suggested that England should only have been awarded one completed run in addition to the overthrow boundary. Dharmasena later admitted this was an error, though said he would "never regret the decision". As a result of the incident, the Marylebone Cricket Club said it would review the overthrow rule. Some active and former players criticised the ICC rule of boundary count and not using the wicket count for a tied match. In the wake of the result of the final, the ICC scrapped the boundary count rule; teams will instead play as many Super Overs as are necessary until the one team wins.

Jacinda Ardern, Prime Minister of New Zealand, said that despite the loss she felt "incredibly proud of the Black Caps, and I hope every New Zealander does because they played remarkable cricket". The New Zealand cricket coach, Gary Stead, said that sharing the World Cup is something that "should be considered".

=== Celebrations ===
"Prince Philip and I send our warmest congratulations to the England Men's Cricket Team after such a thrilling victory in today’s World Cup Final."

— Queen Elizabeth II congratulating the England team on the victory.

In the wake of England's victory, the nation erupted into a state of national pride and celebrations that lasted into the night and most of the next day. The England team stayed at Lord's for most of the night celebrating. The next day, the team hosted an event at The Oval, inviting fans to meet and greet the team, and pose and take photos with the trophy.

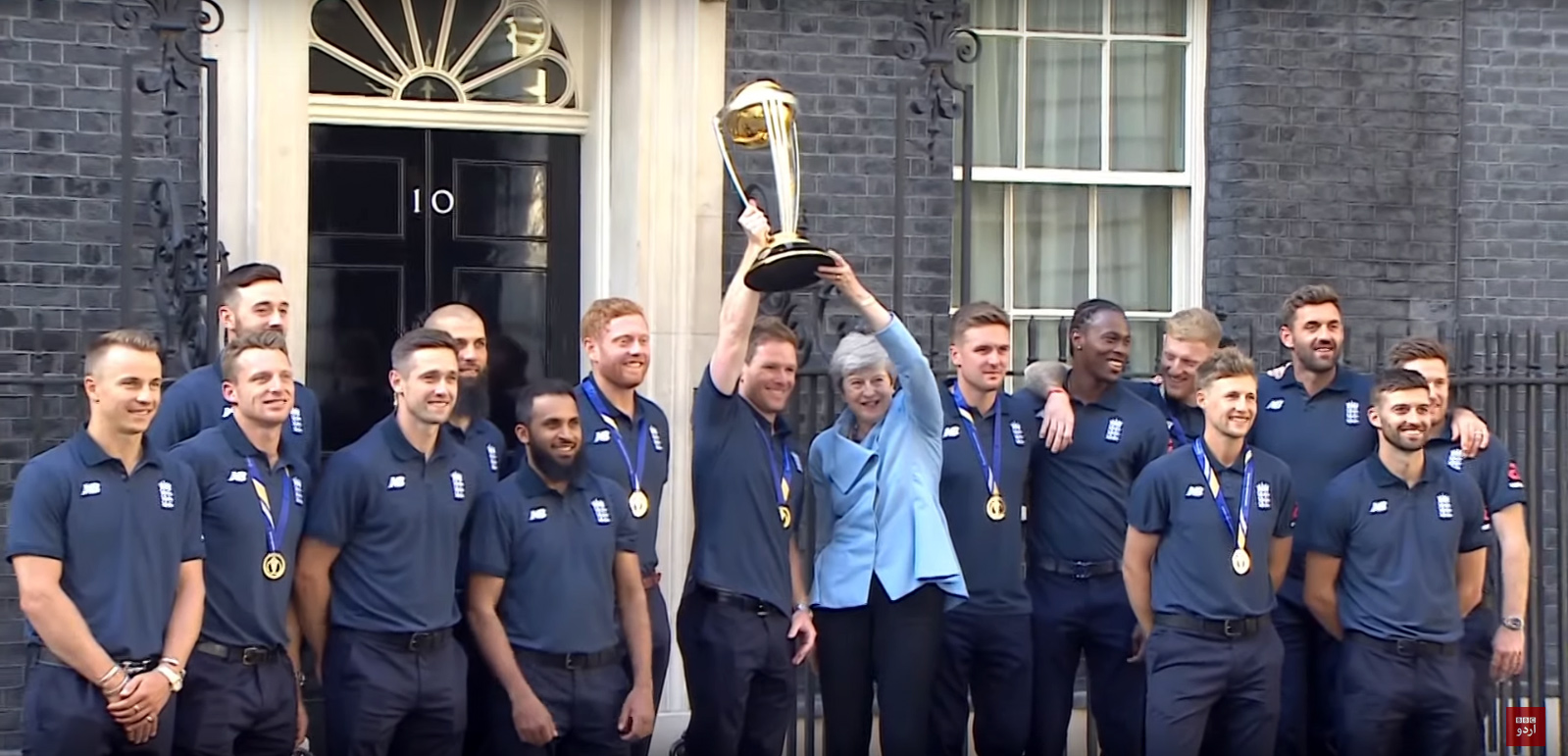
Prime Minister of the United Kingdom Theresa May with the winning English squad at 10 Downing Street. She is holding the Cricket World Cup Trophy along with England captain Eoin Morgan.

British Prime Minister Theresa May invited the England team to 10 Downing Street the day after the victory to celebrate and offer her congratulations. Former Conservative Prime Minister Sir John Major, himself a former Surrey County Cricket Club President and honorary life vice-president, was also in attendance. In December, Stokes was also named BBC Sports Personality of the Year, making him the first cricketer to win it since Andrew Flintoff in 2005. In the subsequent New Year's Honours List, six England players and staff received Order of the British Empire decorations: CBEs for Morgan and ECB chairman Colin Graves, OBEs for Stokes and coach Trevor Bayliss and MBEs for Buttler and Root.

=== Broadcast ===
The match was the first international cricket match to be broadcast on free-to-air TV in the United Kingdom since the 2005 Ashes series. 8.3 million viewers tuned in to see the final, making it one of the most viewed broadcasts of the year, with the highest audience share since the 2018 FIFA World Cup semi-Final between Croatia and England and the 2012 Summer Olympics in London.
