= 2019 Cricket World Cup =

12th edition of the Cricket World Cup

2019 ICC Cricket World Cup
- Tournament logo
- Dates: 30 May – 14 July 2019
- Administrator: International Cricket Council
- Cricket format: One Day International
- Tournament format(s): Round-robin and Knockout
- Host(s): England; Wales
- Champions: England (1st title)
- Runners-up: New Zealand
- Participants: 10
- Matches: 48
- Attendance: 752,000 (15,667 per match)
- Player of the series: (New Zealand) Kane Williamson
- Most runs: (India) Rohit Sharma (648)
- Most wickets: (Australia) Mitchell Starc (27)

The 2019 ICC Cricket World Cup was the 12th Cricket World Cup, a quadrennial One Day International (ODI) cricket tournament contested by men's national teams and organised by the International Cricket Council (ICC). The tournament was hosted between 30 May and 14 July across 10 venues in England and a single venue in Wales. It was the fifth time that England had hosted the World Cup, and the third time matches had been played in Wales.

The tournament was contested by 10 teams, a decrease from 14 teams in the previous edition, with the format of the tournament changing to a single round-robin group with the top four teams qualifying through to the knockout stage. After six weeks of round-robin matches, which saw four games not have a result, India, Australia, England, and New Zealand finished as the top four, with Pakistan missing out on net run rate.

In the knockout stage, England and New Zealand won their respective semi-finals to qualify for the final, which was played at Lord's in London. The final ended in a tie after the match ended with both teams scoring 241 runs, followed by the first Super Over in an ODI; England won the title, their first, on the boundary countback rule after the Super Over also finished level. The total attendance throughout the 2019 ICC Cricket World Cup was 752,000. Overall, videos of the group stages amassed over 2.6 billion views from around the world, making it the most-watched cricket competition as of 2019.

== Hosting ==
The hosting rights were awarded in April 2006, after England and Wales withdrew their bid to host the 2015 Cricket World Cup, which was played in Australia and New Zealand. It was the fifth Cricket World Cup played in England, following the 1975, 1979, 1983 and 1999 World Cups. Wales also hosted matches at the 1983 and 1999 tournaments, the latter also seeing matches played in Scotland, Ireland and the Netherlands.

== Qualification ==
Highlighted are the countries that participated in the 2019 Cricket World Cup. Qualified as host Qualified via the ICC ODI Championship ranking Qualified via the 2018 qualifier Participated in the qualifier but failed to qualify

The 2019 World Cup featured 10 teams, a decrease from previous World Cups in 2011 and 2015, which each featured 14 teams. The hosts (England) and the top seven other teams in the ICC One Day International rankings on 30 September 2017 earned an automatic qualification. Results from 19 September 2017 confirmed that these teams were Australia, Bangladesh, England, India, New Zealand, Pakistan, South Africa and Sri Lanka. The remaining two spots were decided by the 2018 Cricket World Cup Qualifier.

At the time of the announcement of the qualification structure, ICC Associate and Affiliate Members, who were guaranteed four spots in the previous two World Cup tournaments, could now only be represented by at most two teams, and possibly none at all if they were beaten by the lowest-ranked Full Members in the Qualifier. It also meant that at least two of the ten Test-playing nations at the time of the announcement would have to play in the qualifying tournament, and could miss the World Cup finals entirely. Thus, this was the first World Cup to be contested without all of the Full Member nations being present.

The final stage of the tournament was a "Super Six" group, from which the top two teams qualified for the 2019 World Cup. The West Indies were guaranteed a spot after defeating Scotland in the penultimate round. Afghanistan joined them after defeating Ireland in the final over of their match. This was the first time since 1983 that Zimbabwe had failed to qualify for a World Cup. Ireland also missed the competition for the first time since 2007, and, for the first time, no Associate nation participated.

Means of qualification	Date	Venue	Berths	Qualified
Host nation	30 September 2006	—	1	England
ICC ODI Championship	30 September 2017	Various	7	Australia; Bangladesh; India; New Zealand; Pakistan; South Africa; Sri Lanka
2018 Cricket World Cup Qualifier	23 March 2018	Zimbabwe	2	Afghanistan; West Indies
Total			10	

== Venues ==
The fixture list for the tournament was released on 26 April 2018 after the completion of an ICC meeting in Kolkata, India. London Stadium had been named as a possible venue in the planning stages, and in January 2017, the ICC completed an inspection of the ground, confirming that the pitch dimensions would be compliant with the requirements to host ODI matches. However, when the fixtures were announced, London Stadium was not included as a venue. All of the venues used are in England except for Sophia Gardens, which is in Wales. The final was scheduled for 14 July 2019 at Lord's in London.

Birmingham	Bristol	Cardiff	Chester-le-Street
Edgbaston	Bristol County Ground	Sophia Gardens	Riverside Ground
Capacity: 25,000	Capacity: 17,500	Capacity: 15,643	Capacity: 17,000
Matches: 5 (including semi-final)	Matches: 3	Matches: 4	Matches: 3
Edgbaston Cricket Ground	Bristol County Ground	Sophia Gardens	Riverside Ground
Leeds	London		Venues in England and Wales
Headingley	Lord's	The Oval	Venues in England and Wales
Capacity: 18,350	Capacity: 30,000	Capacity: 25,500	Venues in England and Wales
Matches: 4	Matches: 5 (including final)	Matches: 5	Venues in England and Wales
Headingley Cricket Ground	Lord's	The Oval	Venues in England and Wales
Manchester	Nottingham	Southampton	Taunton
Old Trafford	Trent Bridge	Rose Bowl	County Ground
Capacity: 26,000	Capacity: 17,500	Capacity: 25,000	Capacity: 12,500
Matches: 6 (including semi-final)	Matches: 5	Matches: 5	Matches: 3
Old Trafford Cricket Ground	Trent Bridge	Rose Bowl	County Ground, Taunton

== Squads ==
All the participating teams had to submit the names of their respective World Cup squads by 23 April 2019. The teams were allowed to change players in their 15-man squad anytime up to seven days before the start of the tournament. New Zealand was the first team to announce their World Cup squad. The oldest player of the tournament was South African player Imran Tahir, who was 40 years old, while the youngest was Afghan spinner Mujeeb Ur Rahman, who was 18.

== Match officials ==
In April 2019, the ICC named the officials for the tournament, 16 umpires and six match referees. Ian Gould announced that he would retire as an umpire following the conclusion of the tournament.

== Prize money ==
The International Cricket Council declared a total prize money pool of US$10 million for the tournament, the same as the 2015 edition. England, the winning team, received US$4,000,000, the runner-up $2,000,000 and the losing semi-finalists $800,000. Teams that did not progress past the league stage received $100,000 and the winner of each league stage match received $40,000.

== Warm-up matches ==
Before the World Cup, the participating nations competed in 10 warm-up matches, which were played from 24 to 28 May 2019. These matches did not have either One Day International (ODI) status or List A status as teams were allowed to field all 15 members of their squad. (Note: One unofficial warm-up match was held between Australia and the West Indies on 22 May at the Nursery Ground in Hampshire. The West Indies requested the match to give those players who had been playing in the IPL additional time to prepare for the tournament. Australia won the match by seven wickets.)

Warm-up matches

24 May 2019
10:30
Scorecard

Pakistan; 262 (47.5 overs)	v	Afghanistan; 263/7 (49.4 overs)
Babar Azam 112 (108); Mohammad Nabi 3/46 (10 overs)		Hashmatullah Shahidi 74* (102); Wahab Riaz 3/46 (7.4 overs)

Afghanistan won by 3 wickets
Bristol County Ground, Bristol
Umpires: Michael Gough (Eng) and Rod Tucker (Aus)

- Pakistan won the toss and elected to bat.

24 May 2019
10:30
Scorecard

South Africa; 338/7 (50 overs)	v	Sri Lanka; 251 (42.3 overs)
Faf du Plessis 88 (69); Suranga Lakmal 2/63 (9 overs)		Dimuth Karunaratne 87 (92); Andile Phehlukwayo 4/36 (7 overs)

South Africa won by 87 runs
Sophia Gardens, Cardiff
Umpires: Richard Illingworth (Eng) and Paul Wilson (Aus)

- Sri Lanka won the toss and elected to field.

25 May 2019
10:30
Scorecard

Australia; 297/9 (50 overs)	v	England; 285 (49.3 overs)
Steve Smith 116 (102); Liam Plunkett 4/69 (9 overs)		James Vince 64 (76); Jason Behrendorff 2/43 (8 overs)

Australia won by 12 runs
Rose Bowl, Southampton
Umpires: Marais Erasmus (SA) and Sundaram Ravi (Ind)

- England won the toss and elected to field.

25 May 2019
10:30
Scorecard

India; 179 (39.2 overs)	v	New Zealand; 180/4 (37.1 overs)
Ravindra Jadeja 54 (50); Trent Boult 4/33 (6.2 overs)		Ross Taylor 71 (75); Jasprit Bumrah 1/2 (4 overs)

New Zealand won by 6 wickets
The Oval, London
Umpires: Kumar Dharmasena (SL) and Bruce Oxenford (Aus)

- India won the toss and elected to bat.

26 May 2019
10:30
Scorecard

South Africa; 95/0 (12.4 overs)	v	West Indies
Hashim Amla 51* (46)

No result
Bristol County Ground, Bristol
Umpires: Aleem Dar (Pak) and Rod Tucker (Aus)

- West Indies won the toss and elected to field.
- The match was reduced to 31 overs per side due to rain.

26 May 2019
10:30
Scorecard

Pakistan	v	Bangladesh

Match abandoned
Sophia Gardens, Cardiff
Umpires: Chris Gaffaney (NZ) and Richard Kettleborough (Eng)

- No toss.
- No play was possible due to rain.

27 May 2019
10:30
Scorecard

Sri Lanka; 239/8 (50 overs)	v	Australia; 241/5 (44.5 overs)
Lahiru Thirimanne 56 (69); Adam Zampa 2/39 (9 overs)		Usman Khawaja 89 (105); Jeffrey Vandersay 2/51 (7.5 overs)

Australia won by 5 wickets
Rose Bowl, Southampton
Umpires: Nigel Llong (Eng) and Joel Wilson (WI)

- Sri Lanka won the toss and elected to bat.

27 May 2019
10:30
Scorecard

Afghanistan; 160 (38.4 overs)	v	England; 161/1 (17.3 overs)
Mohammad Nabi 44 (42); Joe Root 3/22 (6 overs)		Jason Roy 89* (46); Mohammad Nabi 1/34 (3 overs)

England won by 9 wickets
The Oval, London
Umpires: Ruchira Palliyaguruge (SL) and Paul Reiffel (Aus)

- England won the toss and elected to field.

28 May 2019
10:30
Scorecard

West Indies; 421 (49.2 overs)	v	New Zealand; 330 (47.2 overs)
Shai Hope 101 (86); Trent Boult 4/50 (9.2 overs)		Tom Blundell 106 (89); Carlos Brathwaite 3/75 (9 overs)

West Indies won by 91 runs
Bristol County Ground, Bristol
Umpires: Michael Gough (Eng) and Ian Gould (Eng)

- New Zealand won the toss and elected to field.

28 May 2019
10:30
Scorecard

India; 359/7 (50 overs)	v	Bangladesh; 264 (49.3 overs)
MS Dhoni 113 (78); Shakib Al Hasan 2/58 (6 overs)		Mushfiqur Rahim 90 (94); Kuldeep Yadav 3/47 (10 overs)

India won by 95 runs
Sophia Gardens, Cardiff
Umpires: Richard Kettleborough (Eng) and Paul Wilson (Aus)

- Bangladesh won the toss and elected to field.

== Opening ceremony ==
The opening ceremony took place on The Mall in central London during the evening of 29 May 2019, a day before the start of the World Cup. Andrew Flintoff, Paddy McGuinness and Shibani Dandekar hosted the event. Prior to the opening ceremony, the 10 captains met at Buckingham Palace where they were greeted by Queen Elizabeth II and Prince Harry. A 60-second challenge took place among the 10 participating 'teams', with each team represented by two guest figures, including Viv Richards, Anil Kumble, Mahela Jayawardene, Jacques Kallis, Brett Lee, Kevin Pietersen, Farhan Akhtar, Malala Yousafzai, Yohan Blake, Damayanthi Dharsha, Azhar Ali, Abdur Razzak, Jaya Ahsan, James Franklin and Steven Pienaar, while David Boon was the umpire for the game. England won the game by scoring 74 points, and Australia came second with 69 points.

Michael Clarke, who captained Australia to the title in 2015, took the World Cup trophy to the stage, accompanied by former England spin bowler Graeme Swann. The ceremony concluded with the official World Cup song, "Stand By", performed by Loryn and Rudimental.

== Group stage ==
The initial stage of the tournament saw the 10 teams grouped together for a single round-robin, in which each team played the other nine once for a total of 45 matches. Teams earned two points for a win and one for a tie or no-result (a minimum of 20 overs per side was needed to constitute a result). Matches in this stage had no reserve day set aside in the event of bad weather. After four games in seven days were rained off and complaints were made about the lack of reserve days, the ICC chief executive, Dave Richardson, said that trying to include reserve days "would significantly increase the length of the tournament and practically would be extremely complex to deliver".

The top four teams from the group stage progressed to the knockout stage. If teams were tied on points, then the number of wins and then the net run rate was used to separate them. A similar format was previously used in the 1992 Cricket World Cup, though that tournament featured nine teams instead of ten.

Following the 2019 Pulwama attack, several former Indian players and the Board of Control for Cricket in India (BCCI) called for the boycott of the group match fixture between India and Pakistan. They also wanted to have the Pakistan team banned from playing in the tournament. However, after conducting a board meeting in Dubai, the ICC rejected the BCCI's proposal and confirmed that the scheduled match would go ahead as planned, at Old Trafford in Manchester, despite the ongoing standoff between the two nations.

=== Points table ===
Pos	Team	Pld	W	L	T	NR	Pts	NRR	Qualification
1	India	9	7	1	0	1	15	0.809	Advanced to semi-finals
2	Australia	9	7	2	0	0	14	0.868	Advanced to semi-finals
3	England (H)	9	6	3	0	0	12	1.152	Advanced to semi-finals
4	New Zealand	9	5	3	0	1	11	0.175	Advanced to semi-finals
5	Pakistan	9	5	3	0	1	11	−0.430	Eliminated
6	Sri Lanka	9	3	4	0	2	8	−0.919	Eliminated
7	South Africa	9	3	5	0	1	7	−0.030	Eliminated
8	Bangladesh	9	3	5	0	1	7	−0.410	Eliminated
9	West Indies	9	2	6	0	1	5	−0.225	Eliminated
10	Afghanistan	9	0	9	0	0	0	−1.322	Eliminated

Source: ICC, ESPNcricinfo
Rules for classification: 1) Points; 2) Wins; 3) Net run rate; 4) Results of games between tied teams; 5) Pre-tournament seeding
(H) Host

=== Summary ===
==== Week 1 ====
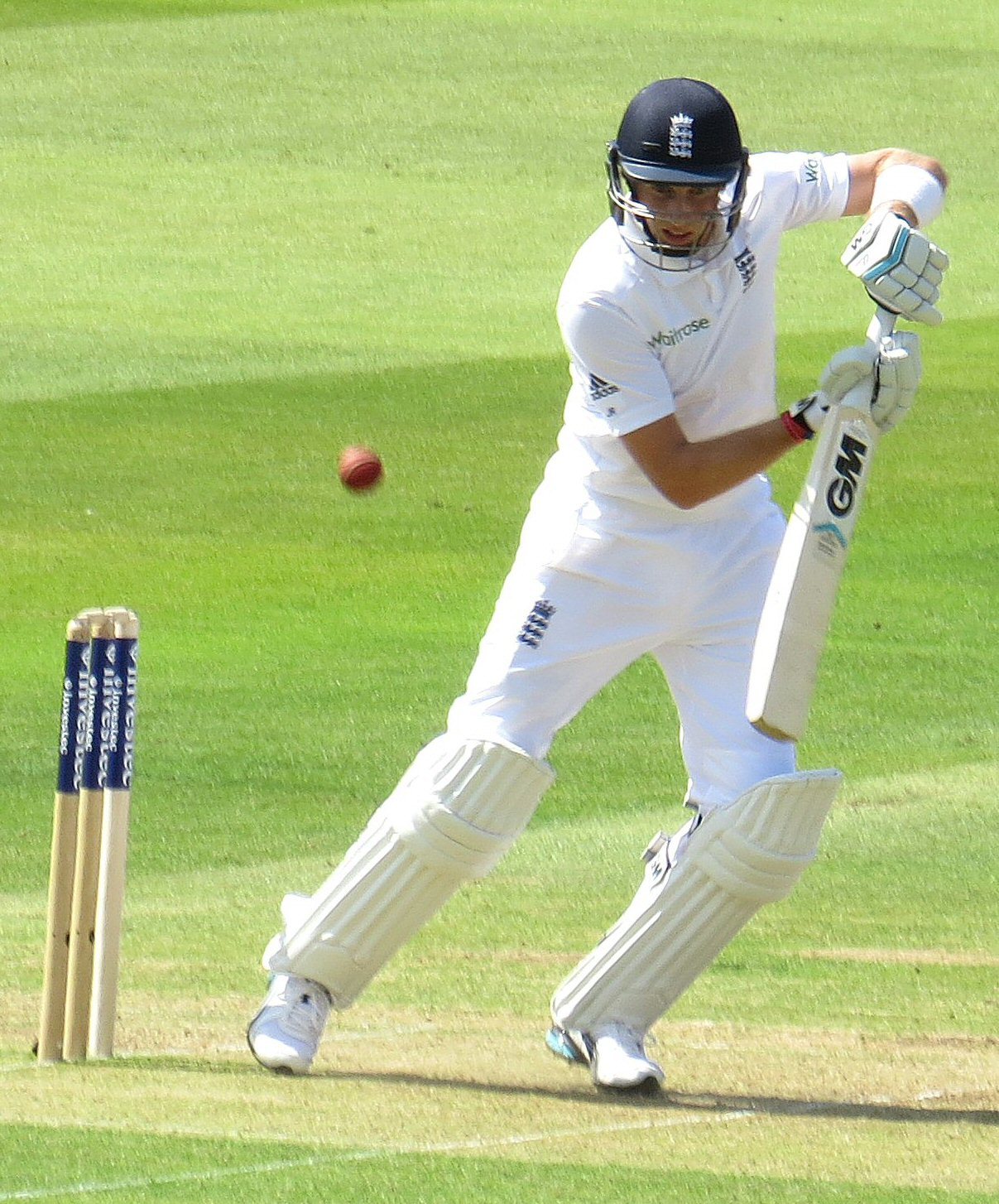
Joe Root (pictured in 2014) was the first centurion of the tournament with a 107 against Pakistan.

The tournament began on 30 May at The Oval in London, between the host nation, England, and South Africa. England batted first and, despite losing their first wicket to the second ball of the tournament, went on to score 311/8, with Ben Stokes top-scoring with 89 runs. South Africa were bowled out for 207, following a collapse of eight wickets for 78 runs, to give England a victory by 104 runs. The next three matches were one-sided: in the first, the West Indies bowled Pakistan out for just 105, which was the lowest score of the tournament. The target of 106 was chased down in only 13.4 overs, the quickest successful run chase in the tournament. The first double-header of the group stage saw comfortable wins for New Zealand and Australia, as they won by 10 and 7 wickets respectively over Sri Lanka and Afghanistan.

At The Oval, in the fifth match of the group stage, Bangladesh made their highest score in an ODI, with 330/6. Mushfiqur Rahim top-scored for Bangladesh with 78, as he and Shakib Al Hasan had a 142-run partnership for the third wicket. In reply, the South Africans could not sustain a partnership with wickets falling regularly throughout their innings. Mustafizur Rahman took three wickets for Bangladesh as South Africa fell short by 22 runs. The following day saw Pakistan cause an upset over one of the tournament favourites, as they beat England by 14 runs at Trent Bridge. This was despite Joe Root (107) and Jos Buttler (103) both scoring centuries in the chase, as they became the first and second batsmen to score hundreds at the tournaments.

In Cardiff, three wickets in five balls from Afghanistan's Mohammad Nabi provided the catalyst for a Sri Lankan collapse, as they fell from 144/1 to 201 all out. Kusal Perera top-scored for Sri Lanka with 78, while Nabi took another wicket to finish with four for the innings. After rain reduced Afghanistan's innings to 41 overs, they were unable to reach the revised target of 187 as they lost by 34 runs. Najibullah Zadran top-scored for Afghanistan with 43, while Sri Lanka's Nuwan Pradeep took four wickets. Wednesday saw a double-header being played at the Rose Bowl and The Oval. At the Rose Bowl, India started their campaign with a six-wicket win over South Africa. Yuzvendra Chahal took four wickets as he helped restrict the batsmen to a total of 227. In reply, Rohit Sharma scored 122 not out to help India chase the target with 15 balls to spare. The other match on the Wednesday saw Bangladesh give New Zealand a scare, as the Black Caps went from 160/2 to 191/5 chasing 245, before getting home with three overs to spare. Ross Taylor top-scored for New Zealand with 82, while Matt Henry was the pick of the bowlers with four wickets.

==== Week 2 ====
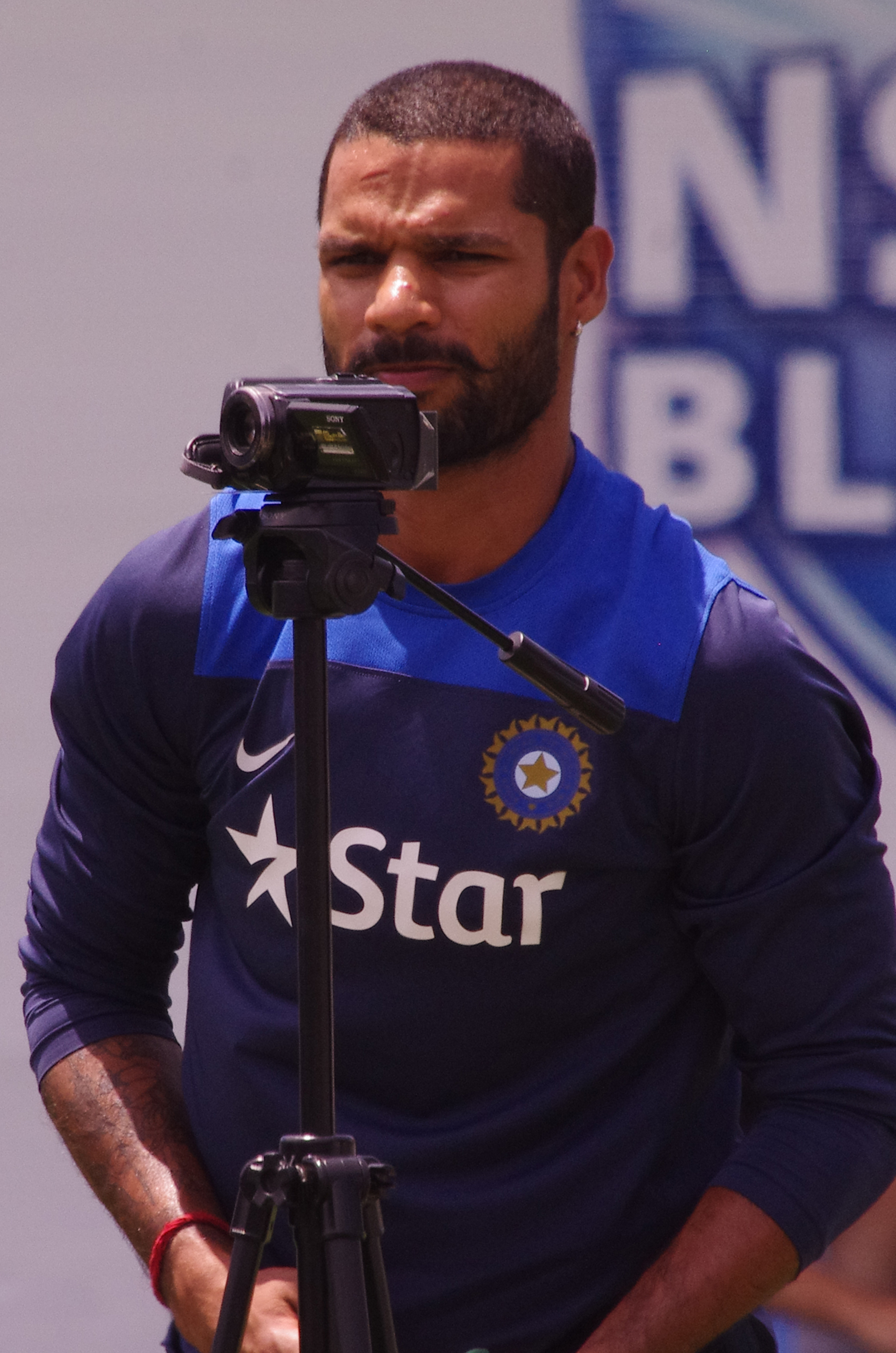
Shikhar Dhawan made 117 runs against Australia in the 14th match of the tournament

The second week began with Australia having an early batting collapse to fall to 38/4 in their innings against the West Indies at Nottingham. Half-centuries from Steve Smith and Nathan Coulter-Nile helped Australia recover before they were bowled out for 288. In response, Chris Gayle had two overturned decisions go his way before he was dismissed for 21. Despite a 68 from Shai Hope, Australia won by 15 runs off the back of a five-wicket haul by Mitchell Starc. After the Friday match between Pakistan and Sri Lanka in Bristol was abandoned due to rain, the Saturday matches were played in nearby Cardiff and Taunton. At Cardiff, Jason Roy made the highest score of the tournament so far, with 153, as he was named man of the match in England's 106-run victory over Bangladesh. In Taunton, a five-wicket haul from Kiwi bowler James Neesham led New Zealand to their third consecutive win, with a seven-wicket victory over Afghanistan.

The final completed match of the week saw India defeat Australia by 36 runs at The Oval. Batting first, India targeted Marcus Stoinis and Adam Zampa's bowling with a combined total of 113 runs coming from their 13 overs, as India scored 352/5. Shikhar Dhawan (pictured) top-scored for India with 117, while Stoinis was the only bowler to take more than one wicket. In the run chase, Australia were behind the required run rate for much of their innings, despite half-centuries from David Warner, Steve Smith and Alex Carey, and were bowled out for 316, Bhuvneshwar Kumar and Jasprit Bumrah taking three wickets each. The following two games of the week were washed out. Only 7.2 overs of play was possible in the fixture between South Africa and the West Indies, while the match between Bangladesh and Sri Lanka was abandoned without the toss taking place. The following day at Taunton saw Australia open with a 146-run stand between David Warner and Aaron Finch, with Warner going on to get a century. Pakistan fought back into the innings, with Mohammad Amir taking five wickets, which restricted Australia to 307. In response, Pakistan could not get a partnership established with regular wickets coming from Australia; Pat Cummins finished his 10 overs with figures of 3/33. Sarfaraz Ahmed and Wahab Riaz tried to get Pakistan the victory with a quick-fire 64-run partnership, but it was not enough, with Starc taking two of the final three wickets in the 41-run victory.

==== Week 3 ====
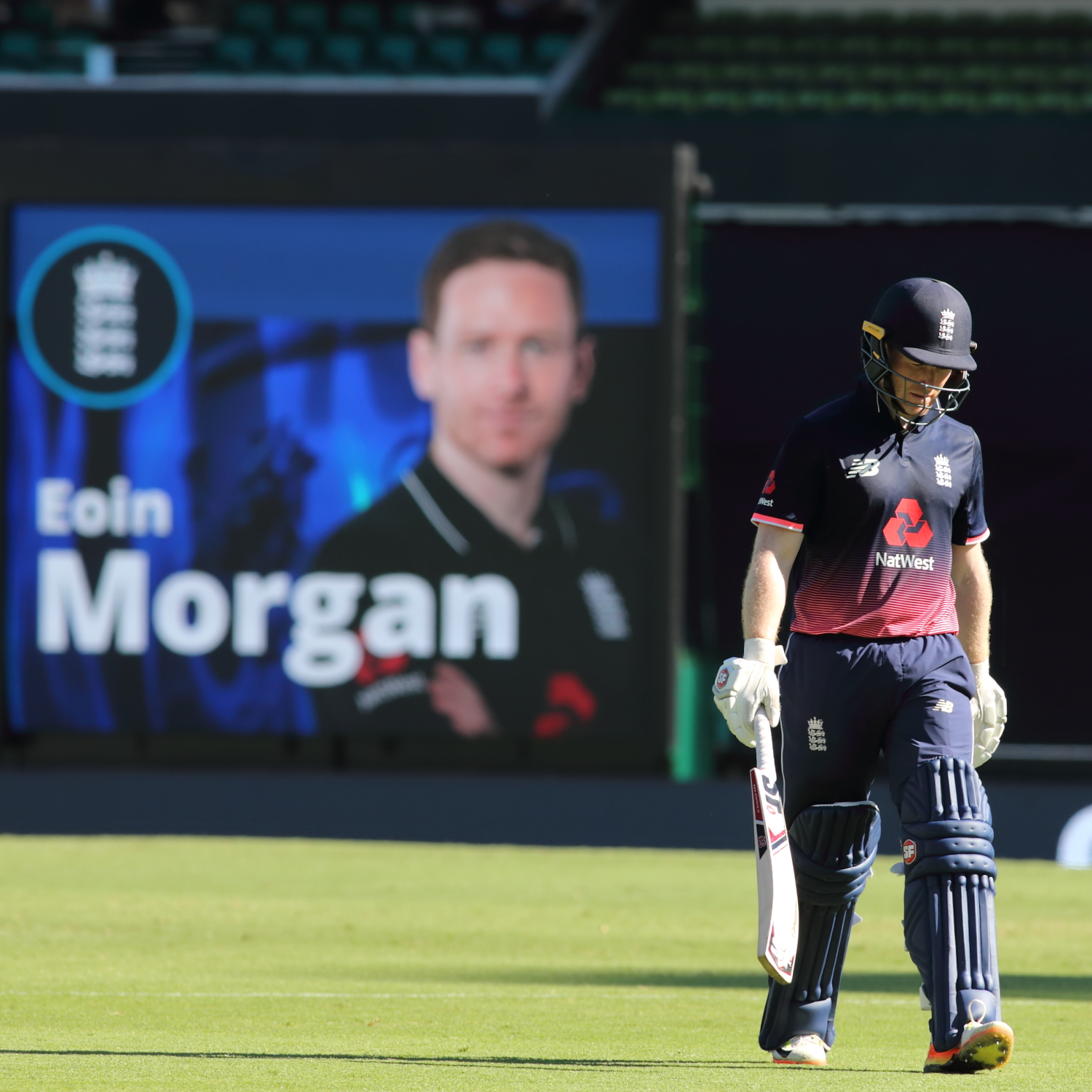
Eoin Morgan hit 17 sixes in the match against Afghanistan, most by any player in the World Cup history

After a wash-out of the match between India and New Zealand in Nottingham to open up the third week, the fourth wash-out in the World Cup, Joe Root scored his second century of the tournament and took two wickets in England's eight-wicket victory over the West Indies at Southampton. However, the English victory was soured as Jason Roy had to leave the field in the eighth over with hamstring injury that ruled him out of the next two games. South Africa recorded their first win of the tournament at Cardiff against Afghanistan, with Imran Tahir taking four wickets as Afghanistan were bowled out for 125. In reply, South Africa chased down their target for the loss of just one wicket. The other match on Saturday at The Oval saw Aaron Finch and Mitchell Starc guide Australia to an 87-run victory over Sri Lanka that sent them to the top of the table with eight points from five games. The following day saw rivals India and Pakistan face each other at Old Trafford. India scored 336/5 from their 50 overs, which included a man-of-the-match performance of 140 runs from Rohit Sharma. In response, Pakistan got off to a good start and were 117/1 at one stage before Kuldeep Yadav took two wickets in three balls to turn the tide for India, helping them to an 89-run victory via the Duckworth–Lewis–Stern method.

Monday saw Bangladesh beat the West Indies by seven wickets at the County Ground in Taunton. In the West Indies' innings, Shai Hope top-scored with 96 runs from 121 balls as he and Evin Lewis (70) got the West Indies to 321/8 from their 50 overs. In the run chase, Bangladeshi all-rounder Shakib Al Hasan scored 124 from 99 balls as aided Bangladesh in chasing the target of 322 and recording Bangladesh's highest successful run chase in their ODI history. At Manchester, Eoin Morgan hit 17 sixes, a new world record in ODIs, as he top-scored for England with 148, leading the hosts to a total of 397/6, the highest total of the tournament. Afghanistan's Rashid Khan conceded 110 runs without taking any wickets, the most expensive bowling spell in Cricket World Cup history, and the second-most expensive of all time. Hashmatullah Shahidi managed 76 in response for Afghanistan, but they were always behind the required rate and fell 151 runs short, managing 247 from their 50 overs. Wednesday saw South Africa taking on New Zealand at Edgbaston. With the match reduced to 49 overs each due to a wet outfield, South Africa posted a total of 241/6 with some late hitting from Rassie van der Dussen, who was unbeaten on 67, while Lockie Ferguson was the best of the bowlers with three wickets. In response, New Zealand were 137/5 at one stage, before a partnership from Kane Williamson (who went on to score a century) and Colin de Grandhomme guided New Zealand to their fourth victory of the tournament.

==== Week 4 ====
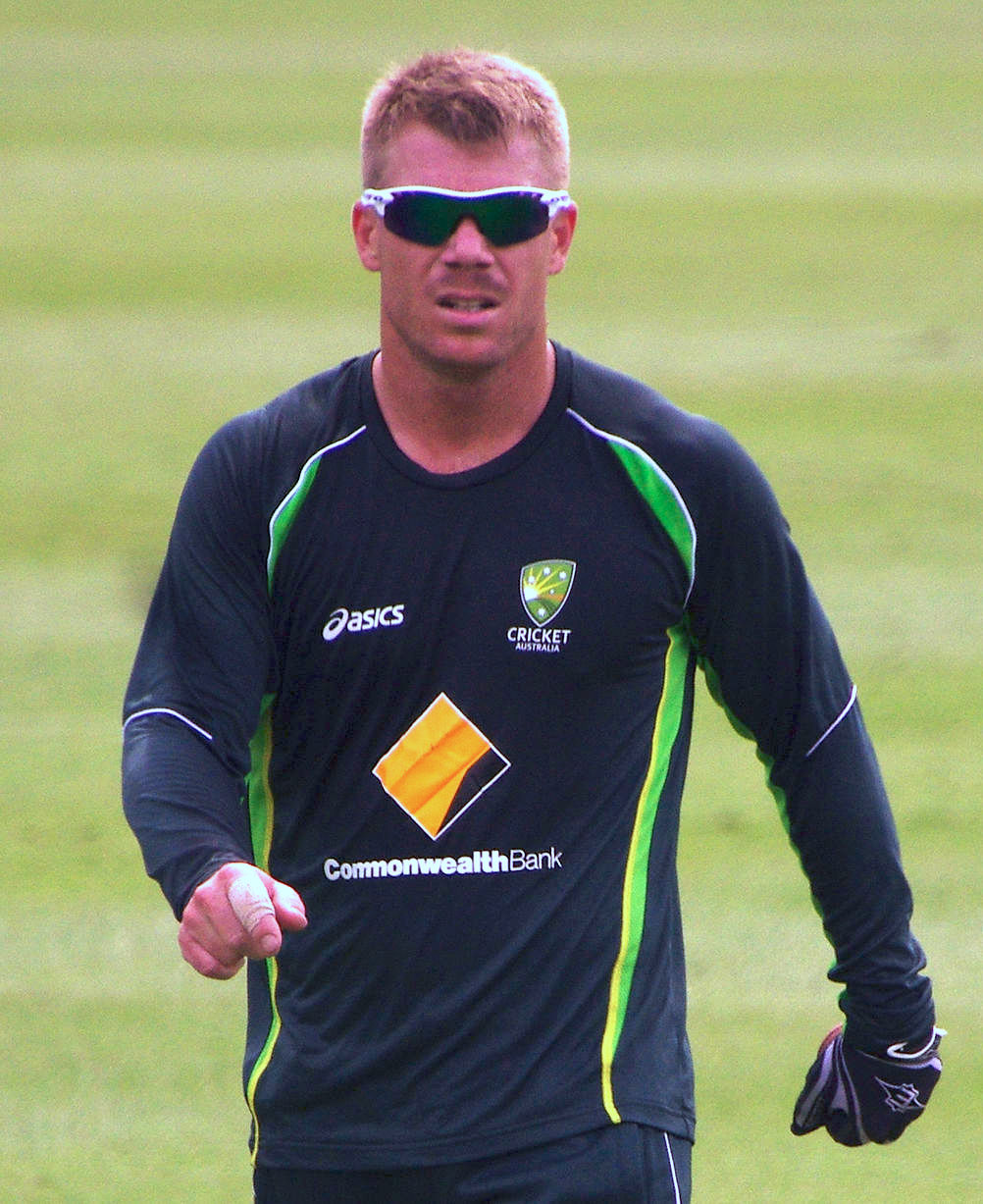
David Warner (pictured in 2014) posted the highest score at the 2019 Cricket World Cup with 166 against Bangladesh.

Week four saw David Warner score 166, the highest individual score of the tournament, as Australia's total of 381/5 proved out of reach for Bangladesh, despite Mahmudullah and Mushfiqur Rahim getting them within 48 runs of the target. Friday saw Lasith Malinga dismantle the English top order, as his four wickets helped Sri Lanka defend a total of 232 for their second win of the tournament. Despite the best efforts of Stokes, who was left stranded on 82 not out, England fell 21 short. Angelo Mathews top-scored for the Sri Lankans with an unbeaten 85, while Mark Wood was the best of the English bowlers with 3/40. The Saturday games saw the first elimination of the tournament, with Afghanistan's loss to India at Southampton meaning they could no longer qualify for the knockout stage. Despite limiting India to 224 from their 50 overs, a Mohammed Shami hat-trick saw Afghanistan fall 12 runs short. The other match on the Saturday saw a close game between New Zealand and the West Indies at Manchester. After New Zealand scored 291/8, including 148 from Kane Williamson, they had the West Indies reeling at 164/7 after 27 overs. The momentum, though, was swung to the West Indies, with Carlos Brathwaite making 101 (including five sixes and nine fours) as he led them to within six runs of the target; however, his attempt to finish off the game with a six saw him caught by Trent Boult at long on, as New Zealand won by five runs.

The following day saw South Africa eliminated from the World Cup after an 89-run performance from Haris Sohail got Pakistan to 308/7 before Shadab Khan took three wickets in the South African run chase to give Pakistan a 49-run victory. Monday saw Bangladesh record their third win of the tournament; a 62-run victory over Afghanistan at the Rose Bowl. The match also saw Bangladesh's Shakib Al Hasan become the second player in World Cup history to take five wickets and score a half-century in the same match. (Note: The other player was Yuvraj Singh in 2011.) Australia became the first team to qualify for the semi-finals as a century from Aaron Finch, a five-wicket haul from Jason Behrendorff and another four from Mitchell Starc guided them to a 64-run victory over England at Lord's, with only Stokes (89) showing any resistance to Australia's bowling. The result left England needing to win both of their remaining two games to guarantee qualification for the semi-finals. Pakistan caused New Zealand's first loss of the World Cup at Edgbaston with a Babar Azam century guiding them to a victory by six wickets.

==== Week 5 ====
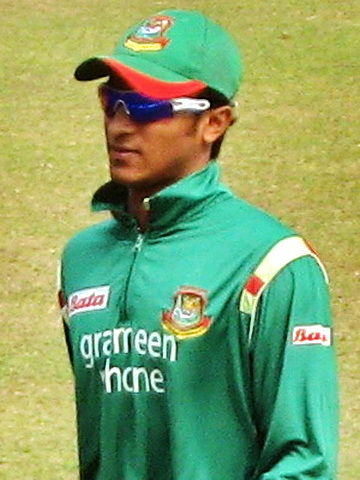
Shakib Al Hasan (pictured in 2009) became the only cricketer in the World Cup history with 600 runs and 10 wickets.

The fifth week of the tournament started with India defeating the West Indies by 125 runs at Old Trafford, with Mohammed Shami taking four wickets as they bowled the West Indies out for 143. The result also knocked the West Indies out of the World Cup. The following day saw play suspended in the match between South Africa and Sri Lanka when bees swarmed the Riverside Ground pitch. Faf du Plessis and Hashim Amla led the run chase with a partnership of 175 runs, taking South Africa to a nine-wicket victory. Saturday saw two matches played. At Lord's, Starc became the first player to take three five-wicket hauls at a World Cup as he guided Australia to an 86-run victory over New Zealand. This was after Australia were 92/5 in the 22nd over before a century partnership between Usman Khawaja and Alex Carey got the total to 243/9. New Zealand managed 157 in response, with Kane Williamson top-scoring with 40. The other match, played at Headingley, saw Afghanistan set 227 against Pakistan, with Shaheen Afridi taking four wickets. The run chase got off to a shaky start with Fakhar Zaman getting out LBW to Mujeeb Ur Rahman for a duck from the second ball of the innings. Babar Azam and Imam-ul-Haq made a partnership of 72, but Pakistan's progress was once again throttled by regular wickets, leaving them needing 46 runs from the last five overs. Imad Wasim immediately hit 18 runs in the 46th over, and despite losing Shadab Khan to a run out in the 47th, Wasim and Wahab Riaz saw Pakistan home to a three-wicket victory with two balls to spare.

The return of opener Jason Roy from injury helped England escape their slump as they emerged victorious by 31 runs against the hitherto unbeaten India in a crucial must-win game for the hosts. An opening partnership between Roy (66) and Jonny Bairstow (111) was the key factor in the victory, while Stokes scored 79 runs off 54 balls for his third consecutive half-century, to help England reach 337/7. The score proved too much for India, despite Rohit Sharma and Virat Kohli scoring 102 and 66 respectively, while the returning England bowler Liam Plunkett took 3/55. Sri Lanka won the dead rubber against the West Indies at Chester-le-Street, where both Avishka Fernando and Nicholas Pooran scored their maiden ODI centuries. Bangladesh's Shakib Al Hasan made history against India, as he became the first man to score 500 runs and take 10 wickets in a single World Cup. This performance was not enough, though, with a Rohit Sharma century leading India into the semi-finals at their opponents' expense.

==== Week 6 ====
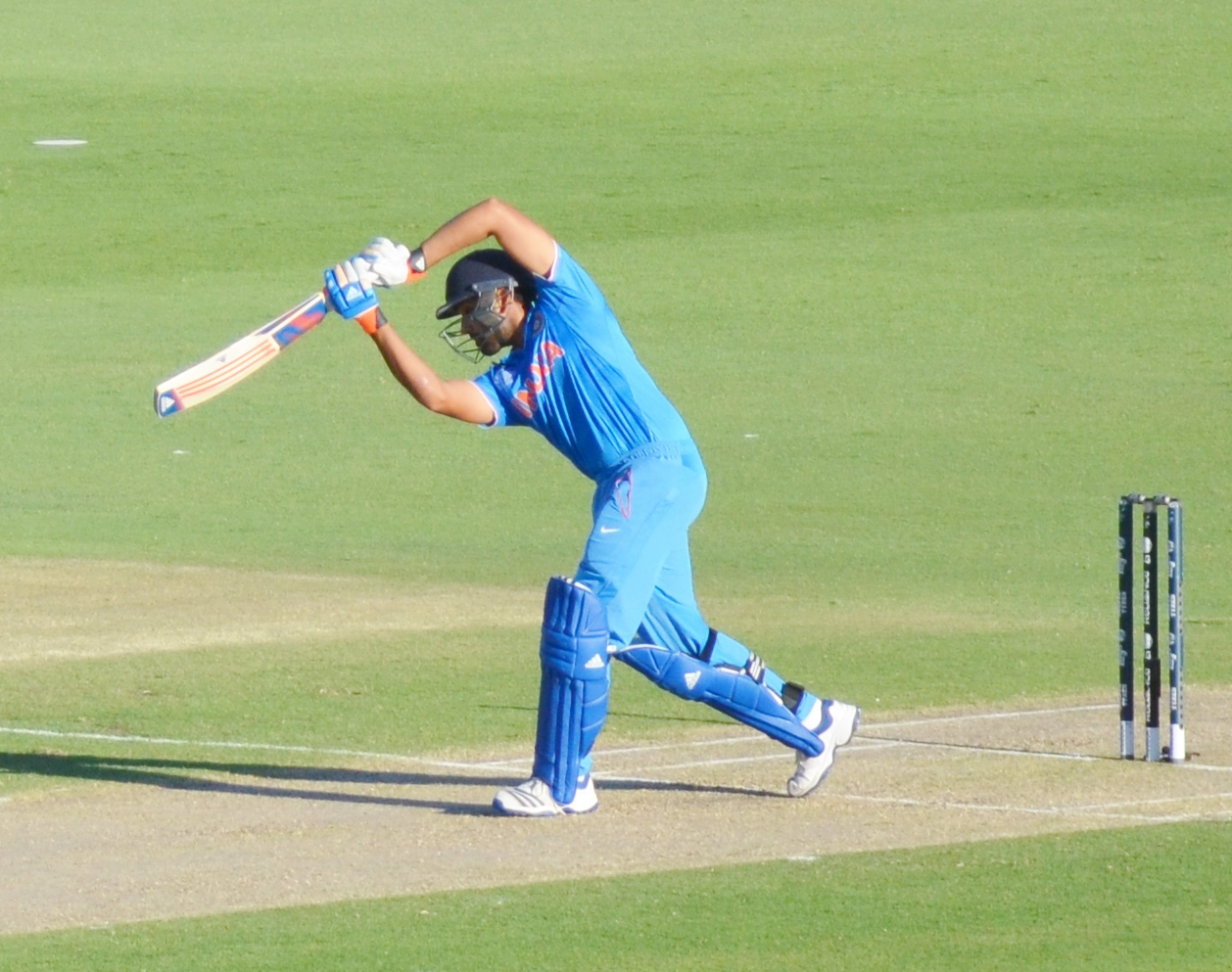
Rohit Sharma broke the record for most individual centuries in a Cricket World Cup by scoring 5 centuries in his 9 innings

The final round started with England taking on New Zealand, with the winner guaranteed a semi-final position. Another Jonny Bairstow hundred saw England win by 119 runs and qualify for the semi-finals for the first time since 1992. After the West Indies won the dead rubber against Afghanistan at Leeds, Pakistan needed to win their final match against Bangladesh by a record margin of over 300 runs at Lord's. They won, but only by 94 runs, allowing New Zealand to take the fourth and final semi-final berth. The match saw Pakistan's Shaheen Afridi, aged 19 years and 76 days, become the youngest player to take a five-wicket haul at a Cricket World Cup with the tournament's best bowling figures of 6/35. Despite Bangladesh losing the match, Shakib Al Hasan finished his tournament with 606 runs, surpassing Sachin Tendulkar's record for the most runs in the group stage of a World Cup. Shakib's record would very soon be surpassed by Rohit Sharma and David Warner by the end of the group stage, with former top-scoring in the group stage with 647 runs.

The final two matches of the group stage were played on the Saturday to determine who would finish top of the group. At Leeds, India cruised to a seven-wicket victory over Sri Lanka off the back of centuries from K. L. Rahul and Rohit Sharma as they chased down a target of 265 runs. This was Sharma's fifth century of the tournament, the most in a single World Cup. Angelo Mathews scored his third ODI century for Sri Lanka, all of which had come against India. With South Africa defeating Australia by 10 runs, India finished top of the table, sending Australia to a semi-final against England. A century from Faf du Plessis and a further 95 from Rassie van der Dussen saw South Africa set the Australians a target of 326. In response, Australia lost Usman Khawaja early on to a hamstring injury; he later returned but was dismissed for 18, before being ruled out for the rest of the tournament. David Warner scored 122, his third century of the tournament, and Alex Carey scored a career-best 85 but crucial wickets in the middle of the innings gave South Africa the victory.

=== Fixtures ===
The ICC released the fixture details on 26 April 2018.

30 May 2019
Scorecard

England; 311/8 (50 overs)	v	South Africa; 207 (39.5 overs)

England won by 104 runs
The Oval, London

31 May 2019
Scorecard

Pakistan; 105 (21.4 overs)	v	West Indies; 108/3 (13.4 overs)

West Indies won by 7 wickets
Trent Bridge, Nottingham

1 June 2019
Scorecard

Sri Lanka; 136 (29.2 overs)	v	New Zealand; 137/0 (16.1 overs)

New Zealand won by 10 wickets
Sophia Gardens, Cardiff

1 June 2019 (D/N)
Scorecard

Afghanistan; 207 (38.2 overs)	v	Australia; 209/3 (34.5 overs)

Australia won by 7 wickets
County Ground, Bristol

2 June 2019
Scorecard

Bangladesh; 330/6 (50 overs)	v	South Africa; 309/8 (50 overs)

Bangladesh won by 21 runs
The Oval, London

3 June 2019
Scorecard

Pakistan; 348/8 (50 overs)	v	England; 334/9 (50 overs)

Pakistan won by 14 runs
Trent Bridge, Nottingham

4 June 2019
Scorecard

Sri Lanka; 201 (36.5 overs)	v	Afghanistan; 152 (32.4 overs)

Sri Lanka won by 34 runs (DLS method)
Sophia Gardens, Cardiff

5 June 2019
Scorecard

South Africa; 227/9 (50 overs)	v	India; 230/4 (47.3 overs)

India won by 6 wickets
Rose Bowl, Southampton

5 June 2019 (D/N)
Scorecard

Bangladesh; 244 (49.2 overs)	v	New Zealand; 248/8 (47.1 overs)

New Zealand won by 2 wickets
The Oval, London

6 June 2019
Scorecard

Australia; 288 (49 overs)	v	West Indies; 273/9 (50 overs)

Australia won by 15 runs
Trent Bridge, Nottingham

7 June 2019
Scorecard

Pakistan	v	Sri Lanka

Match abandoned
County Ground, Bristol

8 June 2019
Scorecard

England; 386/6 (50 overs)	v	Bangladesh; 280 (48.5 overs)

England won by 106 runs
Sophia Gardens, Cardiff

8 June 2019 (D/N)
Scorecard

Afghanistan; 172 (41.1 overs)	v	New Zealand; 173/3 (32.1 overs)

New Zealand won by 7 wickets
County Ground, Taunton

9 June 2019
Scorecard

India; 352/5 (50 overs)	v	Australia; 316 (50 overs)

India won by 36 runs
The Oval, London

10 June 2019
Scorecard

South Africa; 29/2 (7.3 overs)	v	West Indies

No result
Rose Bowl, Southampton

11 June 2019
Scorecard

Bangladesh	v	Sri Lanka

Match abandoned
County Ground, Bristol

12 June 2019
Scorecard

Australia; 307 (49 overs)	v	Pakistan; 266 (45.4 overs)

Australia won by 41 runs
County Ground, Taunton

13 June 2019
Scorecard

India	v	New Zealand

Match abandoned
Trent Bridge, Nottingham

14 June 2019
Scorecard

West Indies; 212 (44.4 overs)	v	England; 213/2 (33.1 overs)

England won by 8 wickets
Rose Bowl, Southampton

15 June 2019
Scorecard

Australia; 334/7 (50 overs)	v	Sri Lanka; 247 (45.5 overs)

Australia won by 87 runs
The Oval, London

15 June 2019 (D/N)
Scorecard

Afghanistan; 125 (34.1 overs)	v	South Africa; 131/1 (28.4 overs)

South Africa won by 9 wickets (DLS method)
Sophia Gardens, Cardiff

16 June 2019
Scorecard

India; 336/5 (50 overs)	v	Pakistan; 212/6 (40 overs)

India won by 89 runs (DLS method)
Old Trafford, Manchester

17 June 2019
Scorecard

West Indies; 321/8 (50 overs)	v	Bangladesh; 322/3 (41.3 overs)

Bangladesh won by 7 wickets
County Ground, Taunton

18 June 2019
Scorecard

England; 397/6 (50 overs)	v	Afghanistan; 247/8 (50 overs)

England won by 150 runs
Old Trafford, Manchester

19 June 2019
Scorecard

South Africa; 241/6 (49 overs)	v	New Zealand; 245/6 (48.3 overs)

New Zealand won by 4 wickets
Edgbaston, Birmingham

20 June 2019
Scorecard

Australia; 381/5 (50 overs)	v	Bangladesh; 333/8 (50 overs)

Australia won by 48 runs
Trent Bridge, Nottingham

21 June 2019
Scorecard

Sri Lanka; 232/9 (50 overs)	v	England; 212 (47 overs)

Sri Lanka won by 20 runs
Headingley, Leeds

22 June 2019
Scorecard

India; 224/8 (50 overs)	v	Afghanistan; 213 (49.5 overs)

India won by 11 runs
Rose Bowl, Southampton

22 June 2019 (D/N)
Scorecard

New Zealand; 291/8 (50 overs)	v	West Indies; 286 (49 overs)

New Zealand won by 5 runs
Old Trafford, Manchester

23 June 2019
Scorecard

Pakistan; 308/7 (50 overs)	v	South Africa; 259/9 (50 overs)

Pakistan won by 49 runs
Lord's, London

24 June 2019
Scorecard

Bangladesh; 262/7 (50 overs)	v	Afghanistan; 200 (47 overs)

Bangladesh won by 62 runs
Rose Bowl, Southampton

25 June 2019
Scorecard

Australia; 285/7 (50 overs)	v	England; 221 (44.4 overs)

Australia won by 64 runs
Lord's, London

26 June 2019
Scorecard

New Zealand; 237/6 (50 overs)	v	Pakistan; 241/4 (49.1 overs)

Pakistan won by 6 wickets
Edgbaston, Birmingham

27 June 2019
Scorecard

India; 268/7 (50 overs)	v	West Indies; 143 (34.2 overs)

India won by 125 runs
Old Trafford, Manchester

28 June 2019
Scorecard

Sri Lanka; 203 (49.3 overs)	v	South Africa; 206/1 (37.2 overs)

South Africa won by 9 wickets
Riverside Ground, Chester-le-Street

29 June 2019
Scorecard

Afghanistan; 227/9 (50 overs)	v	Pakistan; 230/7 (49.4 overs)

Pakistan won by 3 wickets
Headingley, Leeds

29 June 2019 (D/N)
Scorecard

Australia; 243/9 (50 overs)	v	New Zealand; 157 (43.4 overs)

Australia won by 86 runs
Lord's, London

30 June 2019
Scorecard

England; 337/7 (50 overs)	v	India; 306/5 (50 overs)

England won by 31 runs
Edgbaston, Birmingham

1 July 2019
Scorecard

Sri Lanka; 338/6 (50 overs)	v	West Indies; 315/9 (50 overs)

Sri Lanka won by 23 runs
Riverside Ground, Chester-le-Street

2 July 2019
Scorecard

India; 314/9 (50 overs)	v	Bangladesh; 286 (48 overs)

India won by 28 runs
Edgbaston, Birmingham

3 July 2019
Scorecard

England; 305/8 (50 overs)	v	New Zealand; 186 (45 overs)

England won by 119 runs
Riverside Ground, Chester-le-Street

4 July 2019
Scorecard

West Indies; 311/6 (50 overs)	v	Afghanistan; 288 (50 overs)

West Indies won by 23 runs
Headingley, Leeds

5 July 2019
Scorecard

Pakistan; 315/9 (50 overs)	v	Bangladesh; 221 (44.1 overs)

Pakistan won by 94 runs
Lord's, London

6 July 2019
Scorecard

Sri Lanka; 264/7 (50 overs)	v	India; 265/3 (43.3 overs)

India won by 7 wickets
Headingley, Leeds

6 July 2019 (D/N)
Scorecard

South Africa; 325/6 (50 overs)	v	Australia; 315 (49.5 overs)

South Africa won by 10 runs
Old Trafford, Manchester

== Knockout stage ==
The knockout stage started with semi-finals at Old Trafford and Edgbaston, the winners of each progressing to the final at Lord's. All three knockout games were allotted a reserve day. If a reserve day came into play, the match would not be restarted but instead resumed from the previous day's play, if there was any. In the event of no play on the scheduled day or the reserve day, in the semi-finals, the team that finished higher in the group stage progressed to the final, and if no play were possible in the final, the trophy would be shared. If any match ended in a tie, a Super Over would be used to determine the winner. If the scores in the Super Over were also tied, the winner would be determined by the two teams' overall boundary count, including both the match itself and the Super Over.

On 25 June 2019, Australia became the first team to qualify for the semi-finals after beating England at Lord's. India became the second team to qualify after they defeated Bangladesh at Edgbaston on 2 July 2019. The following day saw tournament hosts England become the third team to qualify after they beat New Zealand at the Riverside Ground. After Pakistan were unable to increase their net run rate sufficiently enough in their match against Bangladesh at Lord's New Zealand were the fourth and final team to qualify for the semi-finals.

The first semi-final was played between India and New Zealand at Old Trafford, while the second semi-final was played between Australia and England at Edgbaston.

=== Rules ===
All of the knockout games had a reserve day. If a reserve day came into play, the match would not be restarted but resumed from the previous day's play (if any). In the event of no play on the scheduled day or the reserve day, in the semi-finals, the team that finished higher in the group stage progressed to the final, and if no play were possible in the final, the trophy would be shared. If any match ended in a tie, a Super Over would be used to determine the winner; each team would select three batsmen and a bowler, with the full team available to field. There would be no penalty for the loss of a wicket, but the loss of two wickets would end the Super Over. If the scores in the Super Over were also tied, the winner would be determined by the two teams' overall boundary count, including both the match itself and the Super Over.

=== Bracket ===
Semi-finals
1	India	221 (49.3 overs)
4	New Zealand	239/8 (50 overs)
2	Australia	223 (49 overs)
3	England	226/2 (32.1 overs)

Final
SF1W	New Zealand	241/8 (50 overs), 15/1 (Super Over)
SF2W	England	241 (50 overs), 15/0 (Super Over)

- England won the Final match on the boundary count back rule (26–17).

=== Semi-finals ===
==== Semifinal 1 ====
9–10 July 2019
10:30
Scorecard

New Zealand; 239/8 (50 overs)	v	India; 221 (49.3 overs)
Ross Taylor 74 (90); Bhuvneshwar Kumar 3/43 (10 overs)		Ravindra Jadeja 77 (59); Matt Henry 3/37 (10 overs)

New Zealand won by 18 runs
Old Trafford, Manchester
Umpires: Richard Illingworth (Eng) and Richard Kettleborough (Eng)
Player of the match: Matt Henry (NZ)

- New Zealand won the toss and elected to bat.
- Tom Latham played in his 150th international match for New Zealand.
- MS Dhoni (Ind) played in his 350th & Last ODI.
- New Zealand qualified for the World Cup final for the second time, their second consecutive World Cup final appearance.

Due to persistent rain, the first semi-final was suspended in the 47th over of New Zealand's innings, and continued on 10 July. New Zealand eventually posted a total of 239/8 from their 50 overs; in response, India were bowled out for 221, 18 runs short, sending New Zealand through to their second Cricket World Cup final, having also played in the final in 2015.

==== Semifinal 2 ====
11 July 2019
10:30
Scorecard

Australia; 223 (49 overs)	v	England; 226/2 (32.1 overs)
Steve Smith 85 (119); Chris Woakes 3/20 (8 overs)		Jason Roy 85 (65); Pat Cummins 1/34 (7 overs)

England won by 8 wickets
Edgbaston, Birmingham
Umpires: Kumar Dharmasena (SL) and Marais Erasmus (SA)
Player of the match: Chris Woakes (Eng)

- Australia won the toss and elected to bat.
- Mark Wood (Eng) played in his 50th ODI.
- With the wicket of Jonny Bairstow, Mitchell Starc (Aus) took his 27th wicket of the tournament, surpassing Glenn McGrath's record of 26 he set in 2007.
- With the wicket of Pat Cummins, Joe Root (Eng) took his 12th catch of the tournament, surpassing Ricky Ponting's record of 11 he set in 2003.
- This was Australia's first World Cup semi-final defeat in eight appearances.
- England qualified for a World Cup final for the first time since 1992.
- This was the first time since 1992 that England had beaten Australia in a World Cup match.

The second semi-final saw England take on Australia at Edgbaston. Australia won the toss and chose to bat first, but lost three of their top four batsmen for single-figure scores, two of them to Chris Woakes, to reduce them to 14/3 a ball into the seventh over. Steve Smith held his wicket to top-score with 85 as Australia were bowled out for 223 with Woakes and Rashid being the best of the bowlers with three wickets apiece. England, with the help of an unbroken partnership of 79 between Joe Root and captain Eoin Morgan, saw them ease to an eight-wicket victory and their first World Cup final since 1992.

=== Final ===
14 July 2019
10:30
Scorecard

New Zealand; 241/8 (50 overs)	v	England; 241 (50 overs)
Henry Nicholls 55 (77); Chris Woakes 3/37 (9 overs)		Ben Stokes 84* (98); James Neesham 3/43 (7 overs)

Match & Super Over tied (England won on boundary count)
Lord's, London
Umpires: Kumar Dharmasena (SL) and Marais Erasmus (SA)
Player of the match: Ben Stokes (Eng)

- New Zealand won the toss and elected to bat.
- Super Over: England 15/0, New Zealand 15/1.
- As the Super Over was tied, England won on the boundary countback rule (26–17).
- Kane Williamson (NZ) became the highest run-scorer as a captain in a single Cricket World Cup (578 runs).
- Joe Root (Eng) took his 13th catch of the tournament, the most in a single Cricket World Cup.
- This was the first time that a Super Over was used to determine the winner of a One Day International, and was also the first Super Over to finish in a tie.
- England became the third consecutive host nation to win the Cricket World Cup.

== Statistics ==
India's Rohit Sharma ended the tournament as the leading run scorer with 648 runs from nine matches which featured a 140 against Pakistan at Old Trafford. He finished ahead of Australia's David Warner (647 runs) and Bangladesh's Shakib Al Hasan (606 runs). Australian bowler Mitchell Starc ended up as the leading wicket-taker with 27 wickets, which surpassed the record set by Glenn McGrath in 2007. Second was Lockie Ferguson from New Zealand with 21 wickets, while Mustafizur Rahman (Bangladesh) and Jofra Archer (England) were tied for third place with 20 wickets.

=== Most runs ===
Runs	Player	Team
648	Rohit Sharma	India
647	David Warner	Australia
606	Shakib Al Hasan	Bangladesh
578	Kane Williamson	New Zealand
556	Joe Root	England

=== Most wickets ===
Wickets	Player	Team
27	Mitchell Starc	Australia
21	Lockie Ferguson	New Zealand
20	Mustafizur Rahman	Bangladesh
20	Jofra Archer	England
18	Jasprit Bumrah	India
18	Mark Wood	England

=== Team of the tournament ===
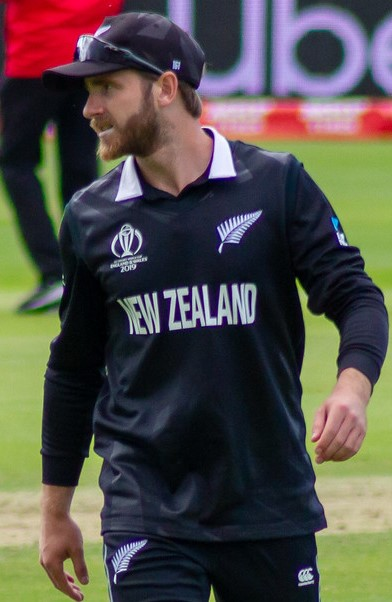
New Zealand captain Kane Williamson was named player of the tournament.

The ICC announced its team of the tournament on 15 July 2019 with Kane Williamson being named as player of the tournament and captain of the team.

Player	Role
(England) Jason Roy	Opening batsman
(India) Rohit Sharma	Opening batsman
(New Zealand) Kane Williamson	Batsman/captain
(England) Joe Root	Batsman
(Bangladesh) Shakib Al Hasan	All-rounder
(England) Ben Stokes	All-rounder
(Australia) Alex Carey	Wicket-keeper
(Australia) Mitchell Starc	Bowler
(England) Jofra Archer	Bowler
(New Zealand) Lockie Ferguson	Bowler
(India) Jasprit Bumrah	Bowler
(New Zealand) Trent Boult	12th man

== Broadcasting ==
The ICC agreed deals for broadcast and digital distribution on a range of platforms, including television, radio and online streaming. The in-house ICC TV served as host broadcasters of the world feed, in collaboration with Sunset+Vine (as part of a new long-term agreement covering all ICC events, excluding the 2021 ICC T20 World Cup and 2023 Cricket World Cup in India).

In the United Kingdom, live coverage of the tournament was exclusive to pay television service Sky Sports, with free-to-air highlights packages sub-licensed to Channel 4. Sky later agreed to sub-license a simulcast of the final to Channel 4 if England reached the final. Sky Sport (New Zealand) also decided to air the final on its co-owned free-to-air channel Prime.

Hotstar held digital rights to the tournament in India and several other markets. Hotstar surpassed 100 million daily users during the group match between India and Pakistan, and reached a record 25.3 million concurrent viewers during the semi-final between India and New Zealand.

Location	Television broadcaster(s)	Radio broadcaster(s)	Web streaming	Mobile
Afghanistan	Cable/satellite Afghanistan National Television		Hotstar.com	Hotstar
Australia	Cable/satellite (pay): Fox Sports; Free-to-air: Nine Network (only Australia matches, selected matches, both semi-finals and the final)	ABC Grandstand; 1116 SEN; Macquarie Sports Radio	foxsports.com.au cricket.com.au	Kayo
Middle East	Cable/satellite OSN Sports Cricket, Eleven Sports	Radio 4 89.1 FM & Gold FM 101.3 (UAE)	OSN.com/PlayWavo.com	OSN, Wavo
Bangladesh	Cable/satellite Bangladesh Television, Gazi TV and Star Sports	Bangladesh Betar	Rabbitholebd.com	Rabbithole App
Brunei and Malaysia	Star Cricket		astrogo.astro.com.my	Astro Go
Canada	Cable/Satellite (pay): ATN Network		Hotstar.com	Hotstar
Central America and the Caribbean	ESPN		espn.co.uk Caribbean	ESPN Play; Caribbean
Azerbaijan and Kazakhstan			Hotstar.com	Hotstar
Europe (except UK and Ireland)			Hotstar.com	Hotstar
Hong Kong	Star Cricket		nowtv.now.com	Now TV App
Mainland China and South Korea	Star Sports			
United Kingdom and Ireland	Cable/satellite (pay): Sky Sports; Channel 4 (highlights, final)	BBC Radio	Skysports.com	Sky Go
India, Nepal, Maldives and Bhutan	Cable/satellite (pay): Star Sports; Terrestrial television and DD Free Dish: DD Sports (India matches, Semi-finals and Final only)	Sports Flash	Hotstar.com, Jio.com	Hotstar, Jio
Fiji and Papua New Guinea	Digicel		www.digicelplay.com.pg/Sports/	Digicel Play
New Zealand	Cable/satellite (pay): Sky Sport	Radio New Zealand	Sky.co.nz skygo.co.nz/livetv	Fan Pass
Pakistan	Cable/satellite: Ten Sports Pakistan & PTV Sports	Hum FM 106.2	Sonyliv.com sportslive.ptv.com.pk	SonyLIV; Goonj
Philippines	Sky Cable			
Singapore	Star Cricket		Starhubgo.com	Starhub Go
Sri Lanka	Star Sports, Dialog TV		Channeleye.lk; Hotstar.com	Hotstar
South America			ESPN.com; ESPN.com/watch	Watch ESPN Brazil; ESPN Play South; ESPN Play North
Africa	Cable/satellite: SuperSport		SuperSport.com	SuperSport App
Indonesia and Thailand	Fox Sports			
United States and associated territories	Willow TV		WillowTv.com; Hotstar.com	Hotstar; Willow TV App

- Source: ICC (unless otherwise stated)

== In popular culture ==
An Australian docu-series, The Test, was produced, following the Australian national cricket team in the aftermath of the Australian ball tampering scandal. The sixth episode of Season 1 featured Australia at the tournament.
