= 2019 Cricket World Cup group stage =

The 2019 Cricket World Cup group stage was played in a round-robin league format, with all 10 teams playing each other once in a single group, resulting in a total of 45 matches being played. The top four teams from the group progressed to the knockout stage. A similar format was previously used in the 1992 Cricket World Cup.

On 25 June 2019, Australia became the first team to qualify for the semi-finals, after beating England at Lord's. India became the second team to qualify for the semi-finals, after they defeated Bangladesh at Edgbaston on 2 July 2019. The following day saw tournament hosts England become the third team to qualify for the semi-finals, after they beat New Zealand at the Riverside Ground. New Zealand were the fourth and final team to qualify for the semi-finals, after Pakistan were unable to increase their net run rate sufficiently enough in their final group stage match against Bangladesh at Lord's.

== Points table ==
Pos	Team	Pld	W	L	T	NR	Pts	NRR	Qualification
1	India	9	7	1	0	1	15	0.809	Advanced to semi-finals
2	Australia	9	7	2	0	0	14	0.868	Advanced to semi-finals
3	England (H)	9	6	3	0	0	12	1.152	Advanced to semi-finals
4	New Zealand	9	5	3	0	1	11	0.175	Advanced to semi-finals
5	Pakistan	9	5	3	0	1	11	−0.430	Eliminated
6	Sri Lanka	9	3	4	0	2	8	−0.919	Eliminated
7	South Africa	9	3	5	0	1	7	−0.030	Eliminated
8	Bangladesh	9	3	5	0	1	7	−0.410	Eliminated
9	West Indies	9	2	6	0	1	5	−0.225	Eliminated
10	Afghanistan	9	0	9	0	0	0	−1.322	Eliminated

Source: ICC, ESPNcricinfo
Rules for classification: 1) Points; 2) Wins; 3) Net run rate; 4) Results of games between tied teams; 5) Pre-tournament seeding
(H) Host

== Group stage summary ==
Team ↓ vs →	Afghanistan	Australia	Bangladesh	England	India	New Zealand	Pakistan	South Africa	Sri Lanka	West Indies
Afghanistan		Lost by 7 wickets	Lost by 62 runs	Lost by 150 runs	Lost by 11 runs	Lost by 7 wickets	Lost by 3 wickets	Lost by 9 wickets	Lost by 34 runs	Lost by 23 runs
Australia			Won by 48 runs	Won by 64 runs	Lost by 36 runs	Won by 86 runs	Won by 41 runs	Lost by 10 runs	Won by 87 runs	Won by 15 runs
Bangladesh				Lost by 106 runs	Lost by 28 runs	Lost by 2 wickets	Lost by 94 runs	Won by 21 runs	Match abandoned	Won by 7 wickets
England					Won by 31 runs	Won by 119 runs	Lost by 14 runs	Won by 104 runs	Lost by 20 runs	Won by 8 wickets
India						Match abandoned	Won by 89 runs	Won by 6 wickets	Won by 7 wickets	Won by 125 runs
New Zealand							Lost by 6 wickets	Won by 4 wickets	Won by 10 wickets	Won by 5 runs
Pakistan								Won by 49 runs	Match abandoned	Lost by 7 wickets
South Africa									Won by 9 wickets	No result
Sri Lanka										Won by 23 runs
West Indies										

== Matches ==
=== England vs South Africa ===
30 May 2019
10:30
Scorecard

England; 311/8 (50 overs)	v	South Africa; 207 (39.5 overs)
Ben Stokes 89 (79); Lungi Ngidi 3/66 (10 overs)		Quinton de Kock 68 (74); Jofra Archer 3/27 (10 overs)

England won by 104 runs
The Oval, London
Umpires: Kumar Dharmasena (SL) and Bruce Oxenford (Aus)
Player of the match: Ben Stokes (ENG)

- South Africa won the toss and elected to field.

=== Pakistan vs West Indies ===
31 May 2019
10:30
Scorecard

Pakistan; 105 (21.4 overs)	v	West Indies; 108/3 (13.4 overs)
Fakhar Zaman 22 (16); Oshane Thomas 4/27 (5.4 overs)		Chris Gayle 50 (34); Mohammad Amir 3/26 (6 overs)

West Indies won by 7 wickets
Trent Bridge, Nottingham
Umpires: Marais Erasmus (SA) and Chris Gaffaney (NZ)
Player of the match: Oshane Thomas (WI)

- West Indies won the toss and elected to field.
- Hasan Ali (Pak) played in his 50th ODI.
- Shai Hope (WI) took his 100th catch as a wicket-keeper in international cricket.
- Chris Gayle (WI) scored his 40th six in World Cup matches, the most by any batsman in World Cup history, surpassing AB de Villiers's record of 37.
- This was Pakistan's eleventh consecutive loss, their worst winless streak in ODIs.
- Pakistan scored their second lowest total in the Cricket World Cup, and also recorded their biggest margin of defeat in the Cricket World Cup in terms of balls remaining (218 balls).

=== New Zealand vs Sri Lanka ===
1 June 2019
10:30
Scorecard

Sri Lanka; 136 (29.2 overs)	v	New Zealand; 137/0 (16.1 overs)
Dimuth Karunaratne 52* (84); Lockie Ferguson 3/22 (6.2 overs)		Martin Guptill 73* (51)

New Zealand won by 10 wickets
Sophia Gardens, Cardiff
Umpires: Ian Gould (Eng) and Rod Tucker (Aus)
Player of the match: Matt Henry (NZ)

- New Zealand won the toss and elected to field.
- James Neesham (NZ) played in his 50th ODI.
- Dimuth Karunaratne (SL) became the second cricketer to carry his bat in a World Cup match.

=== Australia vs Afghanistan ===
1 June 2019
13:30 (D/N)
Scorecard

Afghanistan; 207 (38.2 overs)	v	Australia; 209/3 (34.5 overs)
Najibullah Zadran 51 (49); Pat Cummins 3/40 (8.2 overs)		David Warner 89* (114); Gulbadin Naib 1/32 (5 overs)

Australia won by 7 wickets
County Ground, Bristol
Umpires: Aleem Dar (Pak) and Richard Illingworth (Eng)
Player of the match: David Warner (Aus)

- Afghanistan won the toss and elected to bat.
- Rashid Khan (Afg) played in his 100th international match, which included one game with a World XI side in May 2018.

=== Bangladesh vs South Africa ===
2 June 2019
10:30
Scorecard

Bangladesh; 330/6 (50 overs)	v	South Africa; 309/8 (50 overs)
Mushfiqur Rahim 78 (80); Andile Phehlukwayo 2/52 (10 overs)		Faf du Plessis 62 (53); Mustafizur Rahman 3/67 (10 overs)

Bangladesh won by 21 runs
The Oval, London
Umpires: Paul Reiffel (Aus) and Joel Wilson (WI)
Player of the match: Shakib Al Hasan (Ban)

- South Africa won the toss and elected to field.
- Imran Tahir (SA) played in his 100th ODI.
- Shakib Al Hasan and Mushfiqur Rahim scored 142 runs for the third wicket, the highest partnership for any wicket for Bangladesh in a World Cup.
- Bangladesh scored their highest total in ODIs.
- Shakib Al Hasan (Ban) became the fastest cricketer to take 250 wickets and score 5,000 runs in ODIs, in terms of number of matches (199).

=== England vs Pakistan ===
3 June 2019
10:30
Scorecard

Pakistan; 348/8 (50 overs)	v	England; 334/9 (50 overs)
Mohammad Hafeez 84 (62); Moeen Ali 3/50 (10 overs)		Joe Root 107 (104); Wahab Riaz 3/82 (10 overs)

Pakistan won by 14 runs
Trent Bridge, Nottingham
Umpires: Marais Erasmus (SA) and Sundaram Ravi (Ind)
Player of the match: Mohammad Hafeez (Pak)

- England won the toss and elected to field.
- Jason Roy (Eng) scored his 3,000th run in ODIs.
- This was the first time England had lost a run chase in ODIs played at home since 2015, ending a streak of 16 consecutive wins when batting second.
- England became the first team to lose a World Cup match with two players scoring centuries.

=== Afghanistan vs Sri Lanka ===
4 June 2019
10:30
Scorecard

Sri Lanka; 201 (36.5 overs)	v	Afghanistan; 152 (32.4 overs)
Kusal Perera 78 (81); Mohammad Nabi 4/30 (9 overs)		Najibullah Zadran 43 (56); Nuwan Pradeep 4/31 (9 overs)

Sri Lanka won by 34 runs (DLS method)
Sophia Gardens, Cardiff
Umpires: Nigel Llong (Eng) and Paul Wilson (Aus)
Player of the match: Nuwan Pradeep (SL)

- Afghanistan won the toss and elected to field.
- Afghanistan were set a revised target of 187 runs from 41 overs due to rain.
- Rashid Khan played in his 100th international match for Afghanistan.
- Lahiru Thirimanne (SL) scored his 3,000th run in ODIs.

=== India vs South Africa ===
5 June 2019
10:30
Scorecard

South Africa; 227/9 (50 overs)	v	India; 230/4 (47.3 overs)
Chris Morris 42 (34); Yuzvendra Chahal 4/51 (10 overs)		Rohit Sharma 122* (144); Kagiso Rabada 2/39 (10 overs)

India won by 6 wickets
Rose Bowl, Southampton
Umpires: Michael Gough (Eng) and Richard Kettleborough (Eng)
Player of the match: Rohit Sharma (Ind)

- South Africa won the toss and elected to bat.
- Jasprit Bumrah (Ind) played in his 50th ODI.
- Rohit Sharma scored his 12,000th run in international cricket for India.
- This was Virat Kohli's 50th win as captain of India in ODIs.

=== Bangladesh vs New Zealand ===
5 June 2019
13:30 (D/N)
Scorecard

Bangladesh; 244 (49.2 overs)	v	New Zealand; 248/8 (47.1 overs)
Shakib Al Hasan 64 (68); Matt Henry 4/47 (9.2 overs)		Ross Taylor 82 (91); Mosaddek Hossain 2/33 (8 overs)

New Zealand won by 2 wickets
The Oval, London
Umpires: Bruce Oxenford (Aus) and Paul Reiffel (Aus)
Player of the match: Ross Taylor (NZ)

- New Zealand won the toss and elected to field.
- Shakib Al Hasan (Ban) played in his 200th ODI.
- Mushfiqur Rahim played in his 350th international match for Bangladesh.
- Ross Taylor played in his 400th international match for New Zealand.
- Lockie Ferguson (NZ) took his 50th wicket in ODIs.
- Trent Boult (NZ) took his 150th wicket in ODIs.

=== Australia vs West Indies ===
6 June 2019
10:30
Scorecard

Australia; 288 (49 overs)	v	West Indies; 273/9 (50 overs)
Nathan Coulter-Nile 92 (60); Carlos Brathwaite 3/67 (10 overs)		Shai Hope 68 (105); Mitchell Starc 5/46 (10 overs)

Australia won by 15 runs
Trent Bridge, Nottingham
Umpires: Chris Gaffaney (NZ) and Ruchira Palliyaguruge (SL)
Player of the match: Nathan Coulter-Nile (Aus)

- West Indies won the toss and elected to field.
- This was the West Indies' 800th ODI.
- Pat Cummins (Aus) played in his 50th ODI.
- Nathan Coulter-Nile (Aus) made the highest score by a number 8 batsman in the World Cup.
- Chris Gayle (WI) scored his 1,000th run in the Cricket World Cup.
- Mitchell Starc (Aus) became the quickest bowler, in terms of number of matches, to take 150 wickets in ODIs (77).
- Andre Russell (WI) became the quickest batsman, in terms of balls faced, to score 1,000 run in ODIs (767).

=== Pakistan vs Sri Lanka ===
7 June 2019
10:30
Scorecard

Pakistan	v	Sri Lanka

Match abandoned
County Ground, Bristol
Umpires: Ian Gould (Eng) and Nigel Llong (Eng)

- No toss.
- No play was possible due to rain.

=== England vs Bangladesh ===
8 June 2019
10:30
Scorecard

England; 386/6 (50 overs)	v	Bangladesh; 280 (48.5 overs)
Jason Roy 153 (121); Mehedi Hasan 2/67 (10 overs)		Shakib Al Hasan 121 (119); Ben Stokes 3/23 (6 overs)

England won by 106 runs
Sophia Gardens, Cardiff
Umpires: Kumar Dharmasena (SL) and Joel Wilson (WI)
Player of the match: Jason Roy (Eng)

- Bangladesh won the toss and elected to field.
- Mashrafe Mortaza (Ban) played in his 300th match for Bangladesh.
- England became the first team to make seven consecutive scores of 300 or more in ODIs.

=== Afghanistan vs New Zealand ===
8 June 2019
13:30 (D/N)
Scorecard

Afghanistan; 172 (41.1 overs)	v	New Zealand; 173/3 (32.1 overs)
Hashmatullah Shahidi 59 (99); James Neesham 5/31 (10 overs)		Kane Williamson 79* (99); Aftab Alam 3/45 (8.1 overs)

New Zealand won by 7 wickets
County Ground, Taunton
Umpires: Aleem Dar (Pak) and Michael Gough (Eng)
Player of the match: James Neesham (NZ)

- New Zealand won the toss and elected to field.
- James Neesham (NZ) took his maiden five-wicket haul and his 50th wicket in ODIs.

=== Australia vs India ===
9 June 2019
10:30
Scorecard

India; 352/5 (50 overs)	v	Australia; 316 (50 overs)
Shikhar Dhawan 117 (109); Marcus Stoinis 2/62 (7 overs)		Steve Smith 69 (70); Bhuvneshwar Kumar 3/50 (10 overs)

India won by 36 runs
The Oval, London
Umpires: Chris Gaffaney (NZ) and Ian Gould (Eng)
Player of the match: Shikhar Dhawan (Ind)

- India won the toss and elected to bat.
- Rohit Sharma (Ind) became the fastest batsman, in terms of innings, to score 2,000 runs against a single team in ODIs (37).
- This was the first time Australia had lost a run chase in a Cricket World Cup since losing to Pakistan at Leeds in 1999, ending a streak of 19 consecutive wins when batting second.

=== South Africa vs West Indies ===
10 June 2019
10:30
Scorecard

South Africa; 29/2 (7.3 overs)	v	West Indies
Quinton de Kock 17* (21); Sheldon Cottrell 2/18 (4 overs)

No result
Rose Bowl, Southampton
Umpires: Rod Tucker (Aus) and Paul Wilson (Aus)

- West Indies won the toss and elected to field.
- Rain during South Africa's innings prevented any further play.

=== Bangladesh vs Sri Lanka ===
11 June 2019
10:30
Scorecard

Bangladesh	v	Sri Lanka

Match abandoned
County Ground, Bristol
Umpires: Richard Illingworth (Eng) and Richard Kettleborough (Eng)

- No toss.
- No play was possible due to rain.

=== Australia vs Pakistan ===
12 June 2019
10:30
Scorecard

Australia; 307 (49 overs)	v	Pakistan; 266 (45.4 overs)
David Warner 107 (111); Mohammad Amir 5/30 (10 overs)		Imam-ul-Haq 53 (75); Pat Cummins 3/33 (10 overs)

Australia won by 41 runs
County Ground, Taunton
Umpires: Nigel Llong (Eng) and Ruchira Palliyaguruge (SL)
Player of the match: David Warner (Aus)

- Pakistan won the toss and elected to field.
- Mohammad Amir (Pak) took his first five-wicket haul in ODIs.
- Nathan Coulter-Nile (Aus) took his 50th wicket in ODIs.

=== India vs New Zealand ===
13 June 2019
10:30
Scorecard

India	v	New Zealand

Match abandoned
Trent Bridge, Nottingham
Umpires: Marais Erasmus (SA) and Paul Reiffel (Aus)

- No toss.
- No play was possible due to rain.

=== England vs West Indies ===
14 June 2019
10:30
Scorecard

West Indies; 212 (44.4 overs)	v	England; 213/2 (33.1 overs)
Nicholas Pooran 63 (78); Mark Wood 3/18 (6.4 overs)		Joe Root 100* (94); Shannon Gabriel 2/49 (7 overs)

England won by 8 wickets
Rose Bowl, Southampton
Umpires: Kumar Dharmasena (SL) and Sundaram Ravi (Ind)
Player of the match: Joe Root (Eng)

- England won the toss and elected to field.
- Eoin Morgan (Eng) played in his 300th international match for England.
- Mark Wood (Eng) took his 50th wicket in ODIs.

=== Australia vs Sri Lanka ===
15 June 2019
10:30
Scorecard

Australia; 334/7 (50 overs)	v	Sri Lanka; 247 (45.5 overs)
Aaron Finch 153 (132); Dhananjaya de Silva 2/40 (8 overs)		Dimuth Karunaratne 97 (108); Mitchell Starc 4/55 (10 overs)

Australia won by 87 runs
The Oval, London
Umpires: Aleem Dar (Pak) and Richard Illingworth (Eng)
Player of the match: Aaron Finch (Aus)

- Sri Lanka won the toss and elected to field.

=== Afghanistan vs South Africa ===
15 June 2019
13:30 (D/N)
Scorecard

Afghanistan; 125 (34.1 overs)	v	South Africa; 131/1 (28.4 overs)
Rashid Khan 35 (25); Imran Tahir 4/29 (7 overs)		Quinton de Kock 68 (72); Gulbadin Naib 1/29 (6 overs)

South Africa won by 9 wickets (DLS method)
Sophia Gardens, Cardiff
Umpires: Chris Gaffaney (NZ) and Ruchira Palliyaguruge (SL)
Player of the match: Imran Tahir (SA)

- South Africa won the toss and elected to field.
- South Africa were set a revised target of 127 runs from 48 overs due to rain.

=== India vs Pakistan ===
16 June 2019
10:30
Scorecard

India; 336/5 (50 overs)	v	Pakistan; 212/6 (40 overs)
Rohit Sharma 140 (113); Mohammad Amir 3/47 (10 overs)		Fakhar Zaman 62 (75); Vijay Shankar 2/22 (5.2 overs)

India won by 89 runs (DLS method)
Old Trafford, Manchester
Umpires: Marais Erasmus (SA) and Bruce Oxenford (Aus)
Player of the match: Rohit Sharma (Ind)

- Pakistan won the toss and elected to field.
- Pakistan were set a revised target of 302 runs from 40 overs due to rain.
- Virat Kohli (Ind) became the ninth batsman (and fastest in terms of innings) to score 11,000 runs in ODIs (222).
- India's score was the highest team total against Pakistan in a World Cup match.
- Hasan Ali conceded 84 runs, the most by a Pakistani bowler in a World Cup match.
- Vijay Shankar (Ind) was the third bowler to take a wicket with his first ball in the World Cup.

=== Bangladesh vs West Indies ===
17 June 2019
10:30
Scorecard

West Indies; 321/8 (50 overs)	v	Bangladesh; 322/3 (41.3 overs)
Shai Hope 96 (121); Mustafizur Rahman 3/59 (9 overs)		Shakib Al Hasan 124* (99); Andre Russell 1/42 (6 overs)

Bangladesh won by 7 wickets
County Ground, Taunton
Umpires: Sundaram Ravi (Ind) and Rod Tucker (Aus)
Player of the match: Shakib Al Hasan (Ban)

- Bangladesh won the toss and elected to field.
- Mustafizur Rahman (Ban) played in his 50th ODI.
- Jason Holder (WI) played in his 100th ODI.
- Shai Hope played in his 100th international match for the West Indies.
- Shimron Hetmyer (WI) scored his 1,000th run in ODIs.
- Shakib Al Hasan became the second batsman for Bangladesh to score 6,000 runs in ODIs and became the fastest player, in terms of innings, to achieve the double of 6,000 runs and 250 wickets in ODIs (202 innings).
- This was Bangladesh's highest successful run chase in ODIs and second highest successful run chase in World Cup history.
- The 189 unbeaten run stand between Shakib Al Hasan and Liton Das was the highest partnership for Bangladesh for any wicket in the Cricket World Cup, and Bangladesh's highest fourth wicket partnership in ODIs.
- Andre Russell (WI) played in his last ODI match.

=== England vs Afghanistan ===
18 June 2019
10:30
Scorecard

England; 397/6 (50 overs)	v	Afghanistan; 247/8 (50 overs)
Eoin Morgan 148 (71); Gulbadin Naib 3/68 (10 overs)		Hashmatullah Shahidi 76 (100); Jofra Archer 3/52 (10 overs)

England won by 150 runs
Old Trafford, Manchester
Umpires: Paul Reiffel (Aus) and Joel Wilson (WI)
Player of the match: Eoin Morgan (Eng)

- England won the toss and elected to bat.
- Eoin Morgan scored the fastest century by an England batsman in a World Cup match (57 balls), and he also scored the most sixes in an innings in ODIs (17), breaking the record of 16 sixes jointly held by Rohit Sharma (IND), AB de Villiers (SA) and Chris Gayle (WI).
- England scored the most sixes in an innings by a team in ODIs (25), and posted their highest team total in a Cricket World Cup match.
- Rashid Khan (Afg) bowled the second most expensive spell in a Cricket World Cup match, conceding 110 runs from his nine overs, becoming the most expensive spinner in ODIs.
- Hashmatullah Shahidi (Afg) scored his 1,000th run in ODIs.

=== New Zealand vs South Africa ===
19 June 2019
10:30
Scorecard

South Africa; 241/6 (49 overs)	v	New Zealand; 245/6 (48.3 overs)
Rassie van der Dussen 67* (64); Lockie Ferguson 3/59 (10 overs)		Kane Williamson 106* (138); Chris Morris 3/49 (10 overs)

New Zealand won by 4 wickets
Edgbaston, Birmingham
Umpires: Ian Gould (Eng) and Nigel Llong (Eng)
Player of the match: Kane Williamson (NZ)

- New Zealand won the toss and elected to field.
- The match was reduced to 49 overs per side due to rain and wet outfield.
- Hashim Amla (SA) became the second-fastest batsman, in terms of innings, to score 8,000 runs in ODIs (176).
- David Miller (SA) scored his 3,000th run in ODIs.
- Kane Williamson scored his 3,000th run as captain of New Zealand in ODIs.

=== Australia vs Bangladesh ===
20 June 2019
10:30
Scorecard

Australia; 381/5 (50 overs)	v	Bangladesh; 333/8 (50 overs)
David Warner 166 (147); Soumya Sarkar 3/58 (8 overs)		Mushfiqur Rahim 102* (97); Marcus Stoinis 2/54 (8 overs)

Australia won by 48 runs
Trent Bridge, Nottingham
Umpires: Michael Gough (Eng) and Richard Kettleborough (Eng)
Player of the match: David Warner (Aus)

- Australia won the toss and elected to bat.
- David Warner (Aus) became the first batsman to score two 150+ scores in the Cricket World Cup.
- This was Australia's highest total against Bangladesh in ODIs.
- This was Bangladesh's highest total in ODIs.
- The 714 runs scored in the fixture was the highest match aggregate in a World Cup match.

=== England vs Sri Lanka ===
21 June 2019
10:30
Scorecard

Sri Lanka; 232/9 (50 overs)	v	England; 212 (47 overs)
Angelo Mathews 85* (115); Mark Wood 3/40 (8 overs)		Ben Stokes 82* (89); Lasith Malinga 4/43 (10 overs)

Sri Lanka won by 20 runs
Headingley, Leeds
Umpires: Marais Erasmus (SA) and Paul Wilson (Aus)
Player of the match: Lasith Malinga (SL)

- Sri Lanka won the toss and elected to bat.
- Moeen Ali (Eng) played in his 100th ODI.
- Adil Rashid played in his 150th international match for England.
- Joe Root played in his 250th international match for England.
- Angelo Mathews scored his 12,000th international run for Sri Lanka.
- Eoin Morgan scored his 9,000th international run for England.
- Lasith Malinga (SL) took his 50th wicket in a World Cup match, and became the quickest to achieve the milestone.

=== Afghanistan vs India ===
22 June 2019
10:30
Scorecard

India; 224/8 (50 overs)	v	Afghanistan; 213 (49.5 overs)
Virat Kohli 67 (63); Mohammad Nabi 2/33 (9 overs)		Mohammad Nabi 52 (55); Mohammed Shami 4/40 (9.5 overs)

India won by 11 runs
Rose Bowl, Southampton
Umpires: Aleem Dar (Pak) and Richard Illingworth (Eng)
Player of the match: Jasprit Bumrah (Ind)

- India won the toss and elected to bat.
- Mohammed Shami (Ind) took a hat-trick becoming the first to do so in this World Cup.
- This was India's 50th win in the World Cup.
- Afghanistan were eliminated as a result of this match.

=== New Zealand vs West Indies ===
22 June 2019
13:30 (D/N)
Scorecard

New Zealand; 291/8 (50 overs)	v	West Indies; 286 (49 overs)
Kane Williamson 148 (154); Sheldon Cottrell 4/56 (10 overs)		Carlos Brathwaite 101 (82); Trent Boult 4/30 (10 overs)

New Zealand won by 5 runs
Old Trafford, Manchester
Umpires: Ian Gould (Eng) and Ruchira Palliyaguruge (SL)
Player of the match: Kane Williamson (NZ)

- West Indies won the toss and elected to field.
- Carlos Brathwaite (WI) scored his first century in ODIs.

=== Pakistan vs South Africa ===
23 June 2019
10:30
Scorecard

Pakistan; 308/7 (50 overs)	v	South Africa; 259/9 (50 overs)
Haris Sohail 89 (59); Lungi Ngidi 3/64 (9 overs)		Faf du Plessis 63 (79); Wahab Riaz 3/46 (10 overs)

Pakistan won by 49 runs
Lord's, London
Umpires: Kumar Dharmasena (SL) and Joel Wilson (WI)
Player of the match: Haris Sohail (Pak)

- Pakistan won the toss and elected to bat.
- Andile Phehlukwayo (SA) played in his 50th ODI.
- Shadab Khan (Pak) took his 50th wicket in ODIs.
- South Africa were eliminated as a result of this match, making it the first time since 2003 that they have failed to progress to the knock-out stage of a world cup.

=== Afghanistan vs Bangladesh ===
24 June 2019
10:30
Scorecard

Bangladesh; 262/7 (50 overs)	v	Afghanistan; 200 (47 overs)
Mushfiqur Rahim 83 (87); Mujeeb Ur Rahman 3/39 (10 overs)		Samiullah Shinwari 49 (51); Shakib Al Hasan 5/29 (10 overs)

Bangladesh won by 62 runs
Rose Bowl, Southampton
Umpires: Michael Gough (Eng) and Richard Kettleborough (Eng)
Player of the match: Shakib Al Hasan (Ban)

- Afghanistan won the toss and elected to field.
- Soumya Sarkar (Ban) played in his 50th ODI.
- Gulbadin Naib played in his 100th international match for Afghanistan, and scored his 1,000th run in ODIs.
- Shakib Al Hasan became the first batsman for Bangladesh to score 1,000 runs in the Cricket World Cup, and the first bowler for Bangladesh to take a five-wicket haul in a World Cup match.
- Shakib Al Hasan also became the second cricketer, after Yuvraj Singh, to score 50 runs and take five wickets in the same match at the World Cup.
- Shakib Al Hasan became the only player to score 1,000 runs and pick up 30 wickets in the World Cup, and the only player to score 400 runs and take 10 wickets in a single tournament.

=== England vs Australia ===
25 June 2019
10:30
Scorecard

Australia; 285/7 (50 overs)	v	England; 221 (44.4 overs)
Aaron Finch 100 (116); Chris Woakes 2/46 (10 overs)		Ben Stokes 89 (115); Jason Behrendorff 5/44 (10 overs)

Australia won by 64 runs
Lord's, London
Umpires: Chris Gaffaney (NZ) and Sundaram Ravi (Ind)
Player of the match: Aaron Finch (Aus)

- England won the toss and elected to field.
- Jason Behrendorff (Aus) took his first five-wicket haul in ODIs.
- Australia qualified for the semi-finals as a result of this match.

=== New Zealand vs Pakistan ===
26 June 2019
10:30
Scorecard

New Zealand; 237/6 (50 overs)	v	Pakistan; 241/4 (49.1 overs)
James Neesham 97* (112); Shaheen Afridi 3/28 (10 overs)		Babar Azam 101* (127); Kane Williamson 1/39 (8 overs)

Pakistan won by 6 wickets
Edgbaston, Birmingham
Umpires: Bruce Oxenford (Aus) and Paul Reiffel (Aus)
Player of the match: Babar Azam (Pak)

- New Zealand won the toss and elected to bat.
- Babar Azam became the fastest batsman for Pakistan, in terms of innings, to score 3,000 runs in ODIs (68).
- Babar Azam also scored his 10th century in ODIs.

=== India vs West Indies ===
27 June 2019
10:30
Scorecard

India; 268/7 (50 overs)	v	West Indies; 143 (34.2 overs)
Virat Kohli 72 (82); Kemar Roach 3/36 (10 overs)		Sunil Ambris 31 (40); Mohammed Shami 4/16 (6.2 overs)

India won by 125 runs
Old Trafford, Manchester
Umpires: Richard Illingworth (Eng) and Richard Kettleborough (Eng)
Player of the match: Virat Kohli (Ind)

- India won the toss and elected to bat.
- Hardik Pandya (Ind) played in his 50th ODI.
- Jason Holder played in his 150th international match for the West Indies.
- Virat Kohli (Ind) became the fastest cricketer, in terms of innings, to score 20,000 runs in international cricket (417).
- West Indies were eliminated as a result of this match.

=== South Africa vs Sri Lanka ===
28 June 2019
10:30
Scorecard

Sri Lanka; 203 (49.3 overs)	v	South Africa; 206/1 (37.2 overs)
Avishka Fernando 30 (29); Dwaine Pretorius 3/25 (10 overs)		Faf du Plessis 96* (103); Lasith Malinga 1/47 (10 overs)

South Africa won by 9 wickets
Riverside Ground, Chester-le-Street
Umpires: Sundaram Ravi (Ind) and Rod Tucker (Aus)
Player of the match: Dwaine Pretorius (SA)

- South Africa won the toss and elected to field.

=== Afghanistan vs Pakistan ===
29 June 2019
10:30
Scorecard

Afghanistan; 227/9 (50 overs)	v	Pakistan; 230/7 (49.4 overs)
Asghar Afghan 42 (35); Shaheen Afridi 4/47 (10 overs)		Imad Wasim 49* (54); Mohammad Nabi 2/23 (10 overs)

Pakistan won by 3 wickets
Headingley, Leeds
Umpires: Nigel Llong (Eng) and Paul Wilson (Aus)
Player of the match: Imad Wasim (Pak)

- Afghanistan won the toss and elected to bat.
- Mohammad Nabi (Afg) took his 200th wicket in international cricket.

=== Australia vs New Zealand ===
29 June 2019
13:30 (D/N)
Scorecard

Australia; 243/9 (50 overs)	v	New Zealand; 157 (43.4 overs)
Usman Khawaja 88 (129); Trent Boult 4/51 (10 overs)		Kane Williamson 40 (51); Mitchell Starc 5/26 (9.4 overs)

Australia won by 86 runs
Lord's, London
Umpires: Richard Illingworth (Eng) and Joel Wilson (WI)
Player of the match: Alex Carey (Aus)

- Australia won the toss and elected to bat.
- David Warner (Aus) scored his 13,000th run in international cricket.
- Trent Boult (NZ) took the second hat-trick of this World Cup, and became the first New Zealand bowler to take a hat-trick in the World Cup.
- Kane Williamson (NZ) became the third-fastest batsman, in terms of innings, to score 6,000 runs in ODIs (139).
- Mitchell Starc (Aus) became the first bowler to take three five-wicket hauls at the Cricket World Cup.

=== England vs India ===
30 June 2019
10:30
Scorecard

England; 337/7 (50 overs)	v	India; 306/5 (50 overs)
Jonny Bairstow 111 (109); Mohammed Shami 5/69 (10 overs)		Rohit Sharma 102 (109); Liam Plunkett 3/55 (10 overs)

England won by 31 runs
Edgbaston, Birmingham
Umpires: Aleem Dar (Pak) and Kumar Dharmasena (SL)
Player of the match: Jonny Bairstow (Eng)

- England won the toss and elected to bat.
- Kuldeep Yadav (Ind) played in his 50th ODI.
- This was the 100th ODI played between the two teams.
- Mohammed Shami (Ind) took his maiden five-wicket haul in ODIs.
- Yuzvendra Chahal conceded 88 runs, the most by an Indian bowler in a World Cup match.
- Sri Lanka were eliminated as a result of this match.

=== Sri Lanka vs West Indies ===
1 July 2019
10:30
Scorecard

Sri Lanka; 338/6 (50 overs)	v	West Indies; 315/9 (50 overs)
Avishka Fernando 104 (103); Jason Holder 2/59 (10 overs)		Nicholas Pooran 118 (103); Lasith Malinga 3/55 (10 overs)

Sri Lanka won by 23 runs
Riverside Ground, Chester-le-Street
Umpires: Bruce Oxenford (Aus) and Paul Reiffel (Aus)
Player of the match: Avishka Fernando (SL)

- West Indies won the toss and elected to field.
- Chris Gayle became the most capped player for the West Indies in international cricket, playing in his 455th match.
- Avishka Fernando (SL) scored his first century in ODIs.
- Jason Holder became the first captain of the West Indies to take 100 wickets in ODIs.
- Nicholas Pooran (WI) scored his first century in ODIs.

=== Bangladesh vs India ===
2 July 2019
10:30
Scorecard

India; 314/9 (50 overs)	v	Bangladesh; 286 (48 overs)
Rohit Sharma 104 (92); Mustafizur Rahman 5/59 (10 overs)		Shakib Al Hasan 66 (74); Jasprit Bumrah 4/55 (10 overs)

India won by 28 runs
Edgbaston, Birmingham
Umpires: Marais Erasmus (SA) and Ruchira Palliyaguruge (SL)
Player of the match: Rohit Sharma (Ind)

- India won the toss and elected to bat.
- Tamim Iqbal (Ban) played in his 200th ODI.
- Rohit Sharma (Ind) equalled Kumar Sangakkara's record of scoring most number of centuries (4) by any player in a single edition of the World Cup.
- Shakib Al Hasan (Ban) became the first cricketer in the World Cup to score 500 runs and take 10 wickets in a single tournament.
- India qualified for the semi-finals and Bangladesh were eliminated as a result of this match.

=== England vs New Zealand ===
3 July 2019
10:30
Scorecard

England; 305/8 (50 overs)	v	New Zealand; 186 (45 overs)
Jonny Bairstow 106 (99); James Neesham 2/41 (10 overs)		Tom Latham 57 (65); Mark Wood 3/34 (9 overs)

England won by 119 runs
Riverside Ground, Chester-le-Street
Umpires: Sundaram Ravi (Ind) and Rod Tucker (Aus)
Player of the match: Jonny Bairstow (Eng)

- England won the toss and elected to bat.
- Matt Henry (NZ) played in his 50th ODI.
- England qualified for the semi-finals for the first time since 1992 as a result of this match.
- This was the first time since 1983 that England had beaten New Zealand in a World Cup match.

=== West Indies vs Afghanistan ===
4 July 2019
10:30
Scorecard

West Indies; 311/6 (50 overs)	v	Afghanistan; 288 (50 overs)
Shai Hope 77 (92); Dawlat Zadran 2/73 (9 overs)		Ikram Alikhil 86 (93); Carlos Brathwaite 4/63 (9 overs)

West Indies won by 23 runs
Headingley, Leeds
Umpires: Chris Gaffaney (NZ) and Nigel Llong (Eng)
Player of the match: Shai Hope (WI)

- West Indies won the toss and elected to bat.
- Chris Gayle became the most-capped player for the West Indies in the Cricket World Cup, playing in his 35th match.
- Chris Gayle also equalled Brian Lara's record of playing in 295 ODIs for the West Indies.

=== Pakistan vs Bangladesh ===
5 July 2019
10:30
Scorecard

Pakistan; 315/9 (50 overs)	v	Bangladesh; 221 (44.1 overs)
Imam-ul-Haq 100 (100); Mustafizur Rahman 5/75 (10 overs)		Shakib Al Hasan 64 (77); Shaheen Afridi 6/35 (9.1 overs)

Pakistan won by 94 runs
Lord's, London
Umpires: Michael Gough (Eng) and Richard Kettleborough (Eng)
Player of the match: Shaheen Afridi (Pak)

- Pakistan won the toss and elected to bat.
- Mustafizur Rahman became the fastest bowler for Bangladesh, in terms of innings, to take 100 wickets in ODIs (54 innings).
- Babar Azam scored the most runs by a Pakistan batsman in a single World Cup tournament (474).
- Shakib Al Hasan (Ban) equalled Sachin Tendulkar's record of making the most 50+ scores in a single World Cup tournament (7).
- Shaheen Afridi (Pak) became the youngest bowler to take a five-wicket haul in a World Cup match (19 years 90 days).
- Shaheen Afridi also took the best bowling figures by a bowler for Pakistan in a World Cup match.
- New Zealand qualified for the semi-finals and Pakistan were eliminated as a result of this match.

=== India vs Sri Lanka ===
6 July 2019
10:30
Scorecard

Sri Lanka; 264/7 (50 overs)	v	India; 265/3 (43.3 overs)
Angelo Mathews 113 (128); Jasprit Bumrah 3/37 (10 overs)		K. L. Rahul 111 (118); Kasun Rajitha 1/47 (8 overs)

India won by 7 wickets
Headingley, Leeds
Umpires: Ian Gould (Eng) and Paul Wilson (Aus)
Player of the match: Rohit Sharma (Ind)

- Sri Lanka won the toss and elected to bat.
- Dinesh Karthik played in his 150th international match for India.
- Jasprit Bumrah (Ind) took his 100th wicket in ODIs.
- Rohit Sharma (Ind) became the first batsman to score five centuries in the same World Cup tournament.

=== South Africa vs Australia ===
6 July 2019
13:30 (D/N)
Scorecard

South Africa; 325/6 (50 overs)	v	Australia; 315 (49.5 overs)
Faf du Plessis 100 (94); Nathan Lyon 2/53 (10 overs)		David Warner 122 (117); Kagiso Rabada 3/56 (10 overs)

South Africa won by 10 runs
Old Trafford, Manchester
Umpires: Aleem Dar (Pak) and Kumar Dharmasena (SL)
Player of the match: Faf du Plessis (SA)

- South Africa won the toss and elected to bat.
- Imran Tahir (SA) played in his last ODI.
- This was the first time since 1992 that South Africa had beaten Australia in a World Cup match.

== In popular culture ==
An Australian docu-series - The Test was produced, following the Australian national cricket team in the aftermath of the Australian ball tampering scandal. The sixth episode of Season 1 featured Australia at the tournament.
