= English cricket team in Bangladesh in 2022–23 =

International cricket tour

	Bangladesh	England
- Dates: 1 – 14 March 2023
Captains	Tamim Iqbal (ODIs); Shakib Al Hasan (T20Is)	Jos Buttler

One Day International series
- Results: England won the 3-match series 2–1
Most runs	Shakib Al Hasan (141)	Jason Roy (155)
Most wickets	Shakib Al Hasan (6); Taijul Islam (6)	Adil Rashid (8)
- Player of the series: Adil Rashid (Eng)

Twenty20 International series
- Results: Bangladesh won the 3-match series 3–0
Most runs	Najmul Hossain Shanto (144)	Jos Buttler (111)
Most wickets	Mehidy Hasan (4); Taskin Ahmed (4)	Jofra Archer (4)
- Player of the series: Najmul Hossain Shanto (Ban)

The England cricket team toured Bangladesh in March 2023 to play three One Day International (ODI) and three Twenty20 International (T20I) matches. The ODI series formed part of the inaugural 2020–2023 ICC Cricket World Cup Super League. It was the first bilateral T20I series between the two teams, and England's first tour of Bangladesh since 2016.

Originally, the tour was scheduled to take place in September and October 2021, with the T20I matches having been used as preparation for the 2021 ICC Men's T20 World Cup. However, in August 2021, the tour was postponed due to fixture congestion and the ongoing COVID-19 pandemic.

The Bangladesh Cricket Board (BCB) confirmed that they were in talks with the England and Wales Cricket Board (ECB) to reschedule the matches before the cut-off time of the Super League. On 3 August 2021, the ECB confirmed that the tour had been re-arranged for March 2023. On 27 December 2022, both BCB and ECB confirmed the fixtures of the tour. However, later in January 2023, the tour's practice matches were cancelled by the ECB due to non-availability of several players and a busy international schedule.

England won the ODI series with 2–1 margin, ending Bangladesh's 7 years unbeaten run in ODI series at home since 2016.

Bangladesh won the first T20I match of the series, which was their first win against England and their 50th win in T20Is. They also defeated England in the rest two games to grasp the series 3–0.

== Squads ==
ODIs		T20Is	
Bangladesh	England	Bangladesh	England
Tamim Iqbal (c); Taskin Ahmed; Shakib Al Hasan; Litton Das; Afif Hossain; Ebadot Hossain; Najmul Hossain Shanto; Shamim Hossain; Towhid Hridoy; Taijul Islam; Mahmudullah; Hasan Mahmud; Mehidy Hasan; Mushfiqur Rahim (wk); Mustafizur Rahman	Jos Buttler (c, wk); ~~Tom Abell~~; Rehan Ahmed; Moeen Ali; Jofra Archer; Sam Curran; Will Jacks; Saqib Mahmood; Dawid Malan; Adil Rashid; Jason Roy; Phil Salt; Reece Topley; James Vince; Chris Woakes; Mark Wood	Shakib Al Hasan (c); Nasum Ahmed; Taskin Ahmed; Litton Das; Mehidy Hasan; Nurul Hasan; Afif Hossain; Najmul Hossain Shanto; Shamim Hossain; Towhid Hridoy; Tanvir Islam; Hasan Mahmud; Mustafizur Rahman; Rejaur Rahman Raja; Rony Talukdar	Jos Buttler (c, wk); ~~Tom Abell~~; Rehan Ahmed; Moeen Ali; Jofra Archer; Sam Curran; Ben Duckett; ~~Will Jacks~~; Chris Jordan; Dawid Malan; Adil Rashid; Phil Salt; Reece Topley; Chris Woakes; Mark Wood

On 16 February 2023, Tom Abell was ruled out of England's squad with a side strain. On 25 February 2023, ECB announced Will Jacks as Abell's replacement in England's ODI squad. However, on 5 March 2023, Jacks was ruled out of last ODI and the T20I series due to a left thigh injury.

On 2 March 2023, Shamim Hossain was added to Bangladesh's ODI squad.

== ODI series ==
=== 1st ODI ===
1 March 2023
12:00 (D/N)
Scorecard

Bangladesh; 209 (47.2 overs)	v	England; 212/7 (48.4 overs)
Najmul Hossain Shanto 58 (82); Mark Wood 2/34 (8 overs)		Dawid Malan 114* (145); Taijul Islam 3/54 (10 overs)

England won by 3 wickets
Sher-e-Bangla National Cricket Stadium, Mirpur
Umpires: Tanvir Ahmed (Ban) and Ruchira Palliyaguruge (SL)
Player of the match: Dawid Malan (Eng)

- Bangladesh won the toss and elected to bat.
- Will Jacks (Eng) made his ODI debut.
- World Cup Super League points: England 10, Bangladesh 0.

=== 2nd ODI ===
3 March 2023
12:00 (D/N)
Scorecard

England; 326/7 (50 overs)	v	Bangladesh; 194 (44.4 overs)
Jason Roy 132 (124); Taskin Ahmed 3/66 (10 overs)		Shakib Al Hasan 58 (69); Sam Curran 4/29 (6.4 overs)

England won by 132 runs
Sher-e-Bangla National Cricket Stadium, Mirpur
Umpires: Ruchira Palliyaguruge (SL) and Sharfuddoula (Ban)
Player of the match: Jason Roy (Eng)

- Bangladesh won the toss and elected to field.
- Shakib Al Hasan become the second Bangladeshi cricketer to play 400 international matches.
- World Cup Super League points: England 10, Bangladesh 0.

=== 3rd ODI ===
6 March 2023
12:00 (D/N)
Scorecard

Bangladesh; 246 (48.5 overs)	v	England; 196 (43.1 overs)
Shakib Al Hasan 75 (71); Jofra Archer 3/35 (8.5 overs)		James Vince 38 (44); Shakib Al Hasan 4/35 (10 overs)

Bangladesh won by 50 runs
Zohur Ahmed Chowdhury Stadium, Chittagong
Umpires: Ruchira Palliyaguruge (SL) and Gazi Sohel (Ban)
Player of the match: Shakib Al Hasan (Ban)

- Bangladesh won the toss and elected to bat.
- Rehan Ahmed (Eng) made his ODI debut.
- Rehan Ahmed became the youngest male cricketer for England to make his debut in ODIs at the age 18 years and 205 days.
- Shakib Al Hasan became the first Bangladeshi player to take 300 wickets in ODIs and also became the third cricketer to achieve the double of 6,000 runs and 300 wickets in ODIs and the quickest, in terms of innings, to do so (227 innings).
- World Cup Super League points: Bangladesh 10, England 0.

== T20I series ==
=== 1st T20I ===
9 March 2023
15:00 (D/N)
Scorecard

England; 156/6 (20 overs)	v	Bangladesh; 158/4 (18 overs)
Jos Buttler 67 (42); Hasan Mahmud 2/26 (4 overs)		Najmul Hossain Shanto 51 (30); Mark Wood 1/24 (2 overs)

Bangladesh won by 6 wickets
Zohur Ahmed Chowdhury Stadium, Chittagong
Umpires: Tanvir Ahmed (Ban) and Masudur Rahman (Ban)
Player of the match: Najmul Hossain Shanto (Ban)

- Bangladesh won the toss and elected to field.
- Towhid Hridoy (Ban) made his T20I debut.
- This was Bangladesh's first win against England in T20Is.

=== 2nd T20I ===
12 March 2023
15:00 (D/N)
Scorecard

England; 117 (20 overs)	v	Bangladesh; 120/6 (18.5 overs)
Ben Duckett 28 (28); Mehidy Hasan 4/12 (4 overs)		Najmul Hossain Shanto 46* (47); Jofra Archer 3/13 (4 overs)

Bangladesh won by 4 wickets
Sher-e-Bangla National Cricket Stadium, Mirpur
Umpires: Sharfuddoula (Ban) and Gazi Sohel (Ban)
Player of the match: Mehidy Hasan (Ban)

- Bangladesh won the toss and elected to field.
- Rehan Ahmed (Eng) made his T20I debut.
- Rehan Ahmed became the youngest male cricketer for England to make his debut in T20Is at the age 18 years and 211 days, and the youngest England male cricketer to play in all three formats of international cricket.

=== 3rd T20I ===
14 March 2023
15:00 (D/N)
Scorecard

Bangladesh; 158/2 (20 overs)	v	England; 142/6 (20 overs)
Litton Das 73 (57); Chris Jordan 1/21 (3 overs)		Dawid Malan 53 (47); Taskin Ahmed 2/26 (4 overs)

Bangladesh won by 16 runs
Sher-e-Bangla National Cricket Stadium, Mirpur
Umpires: Tanvir Ahmed (Ban) and Sharfuddoula (Ban)
Player of the match: Litton Das (Ban)

- England won the toss and elected to field.
- Tanvir Islam (Ban) made his T20I debut.
- Mustafizur Rahman (Ban) took his 100th wicket in T20Is.
