= List of England Twenty20 International cricket records =

A Twenty20 International (T20I) is a form of cricket, played between two of the international members of the International Cricket Council (ICC), in which each team faces a maximum of twenty overs. The matches have top-class status and are the highest T20 standard. The game is played under the rules of Twenty20 cricket. The first Twenty20 International match between two men's sides was played on 17 February 2005. England played their first Twenty20 International match against Australia on 13 June 2005, and this list of records start with that match. England have won the ICC Men's T20 World Cup on two occasions, in 2010 and 2022.

== Key ==
The top five records are listed for each category, except for the team wins, losses, draws and ties, all round records and the partnership records. Tied records for fifth place are also included. Explanations of the general symbols and cricketing terms used in the list are given below. Specific details are provided in each category where appropriate. All records include matches played for England only, and are correct as of November 2026.

Key
Symbol	Meaning
†	Player or umpire is currently active in T20I cricket (this is only used for ongoing records)
‡	Event took place during a T20 World Cup
*	Player remained not out or partnership remained unbroken
♠	Twenty20 International cricket record
Date	Starting date of the match
Innings	Number of innings played
Matches	Number of matches played
Opposition	The team England was playing against
Period	The time period when the player was active in T20I cricket
Player	The player involved in the record
Venue	Twenty20 International cricket ground where the match was played

== Team records ==
=== Overall record ===
Matches	Won	Lost	Tied	NR	Win %
234	128	93	2	11	54.7
Last updated: 21 November 2026

=== Team results by opposition ===
Opponent	Matches	Won	Lost	Tied	No Result	% Won
Afghanistan	3	3	0	0	0	100.0
Australia	27	12	13	0	2	44.4
Bangladesh	4	1	3	0	0	25.0
India	35	16	18	0	1	45.7
Ireland	4	2	1	0	1	50.0
Italy	1	1	0	0	0	100.0
Namibia	1	1	0	0	0	100.0
Nepal	1	1	0	0	0	100.0
Netherlands	2	0	2	0	0	0.0
New Zealand	31	17	10	1	3	54.8
Oman	1	1	0	0	0	100.0
Pakistan	32	21	9	1	1	65.6
Scotland	2	1	0	0	1	50.0
South Africa	28	13	14	0	1	46.4
Sri Lanka	21	17	4	0	0	81.0
United States	1	1	0	0	0	100.0
West Indies	39	19	19	0	1	48.7
Zimbabwe	1	1	0	0	0	100.0
Total	234	128	93	2	11	54.7
Statistics are correct as of 21 November 2026.

=== Team scoring records ===
==== Most runs in an innings ====
The highest innings total scored in T20Is came in October 2024, when Zimbabwe scored 344/4 against Gambia in a T20 World Cup qualifier. The highest score for England is 304/2, scored against South Africa during the latter's tour of England in 2025.

Rank	Score	Opposition	Venue	Date
1	304/2	South Africa	Old Trafford, Manchester, England	12 September 2025
2	267/3	West Indies	Brian Lara Cricket Academy, San Fernando, Trinidad and Tobago	19 December 2023
3	257/3	India	Rose Bowl, Southampton, England	11 July 2026
4	254/4	Sri Lanka	Rose Bowl, Southampton, England	15 September 2026
5	248/3	West Indies	Rose Bowl, Southampton, England	10 June 2025
Last updated: 15 September 2026

==== Fewest runs in an innings ====
The lowest innings total scored was by Ivory Coast against Nigeria when they were dismissed for 7 during qualifiers for the 2026 T20 World Cup. The lowest completed score in T20I history for England is 80, scored against India at the 2012 World Twenty20.

Rank	Score	Opposition	Venue	Date
1	80	India	Ranasinghe Premadasa Stadium, Colombo, Sri Lanka	23 September 2012 ‡
2	88	West Indies	The Oval, London, England	25 September 2011
2	88	Netherlands	Zohur Ahmed Chowdhury Stadium, Chittagong, Bangladesh	31 March 2014 ‡
4	97	India	Wankhede Stadium, Mumbai, India	2 February 2025
5	101	South Africa	Rose Bowl, Southampton, England	31 July 2022
Last updated: 2 February 2025

==== Most runs conceded in an innings ====
The semi-final of the 2026 T20 World Cup saw England concede their most runs in single T20I innings, with India scoring 253.

Rank	Score	Opposition	Venue	Date
1	253/7	India	Wankhede Stadium, Mumbai, India	5 March 2026
2	248/6	Australia	Rose Bowl, Southampton, England	29 August 2013
3	247/9	India	Wankhede Stadium, Mumbai, India	2 February 2025
4	241/6	South Africa	Centurion Park, Centurion, South Africa	15 November 2009
5	232/6	Pakistan	Trent Bridge, Nottingham, England	16 July 2021
Last updated: 5 March 2026

==== Fewest runs conceded in an innings ====
The lowest score conceded by England for a full inning is 45 when they dismissed West Indies during their tour of West Indies in 2019 at Warner Park, Basseterre, Saint Kitts and Nevis.

Rank	Score	Opposition	Venue	Date
1	45/10	West Indies	Warner Park, Basseterre, Saint Kitts and Nevis	8 March 2019
2	47/10	Oman	Sir Vivian Richards Stadium, St. John's, Antigua and Barbuda	13 June 2024 ‡
3	55/10	West Indies	Dubai International Cricket Stadium, Dubai	23 October 2021 ‡
4	71/10	West Indies	Warner Park, Basseterre, Saint Kitts and Nevis	10 March 2019
5	76/10	India	Trent Bridge, Nottingham, England	7 July 2026
Last updated: 7 July 2026

==== Highest match aggregate ====
The highest match aggregate scored in T20Is came in the match between South Africa and West Indies in the second T20I of the March 2023 series at Centurion Park when South Africa successfully chased 259/4 in response to the West Indies' score of 258/5, for a match aggregate of 517 runs.

Rank	Aggregate	Scores	Venue	Date
1	499	India (253/7) v England (246/7)	Wankhede Stadium, Mumbai, India	5 March 2026
2	462	England (304/2) v South Africa (158)	Old Trafford, Manchester, England	12 September 2025
3	459	South Africa (229/4) v England (230/8)	Wankhede Stadium, Mumbai, India	18 March 2016 ‡
3	459	England (267/3) v West Indies (192)	Brian Lara Cricket Academy, Tarouba, Trinidad and Tobago	19 December 2023
3	459	England (248/3) v West Indies (211/8)	Rose Bowl, Southampton, England	10 June 2025
Last updated: 5 March 2026

==== Lowest match aggregate ====
The lowest match aggregate in T20Is is 23, which has occurred twice. The lowest match aggregate for a match involving England is 97, during the 2024 Men's T20 World Cup when England dismissed Oman for 47 runs.

Rank	Aggregate	Scores	Venue	Date
1	97	Oman (47) v England (50/2)	Sir Vivian Richards Stadium, St. John's, Antigua and Barbuda	13 June 2024 ‡
2	111	West Indies (55) v England (56/4)	Dubai International Cricket Stadium, Dubai	23 October 2021 ‡
3	143	West Indies (71) v England (72/2)	Warner Park, Basseterre, Saint Kitts and Nevis	10 March 2019
4	151	England (54/5) v South Africa (97/5)	Sophia Gardens, Cardiff, Wales	10 September 2025
5	179	Pakistan (89) v England (90/4)	Sophia Gardens, Cardiff, Wales	7 September 2010
Last updated: 10 September 2025

=== Result records ===
A T20I match is won when one side has scored more runs than the runs scored by the opposing side during their innings. If both sides have completed both their allocated innings and the side that fielded last has the higher aggregate of runs, it is known as a win by runs. This indicates the number of runs that they had scored more than the opposing side. If the side batting last wins the match, it is known as a win by wickets, indicating the number of wickets that were still to fall.

==== Greatest win margins (by runs) ====
The greatest winning margin by runs in T20Is was Zimbabwe's victory over Gambia by 290 runs in the 2024 African qualifiers for the 2026 T20 World Cup. The largest victory recorded by England was 146 runs, during South Africa's tour of England in 2025.

Rank	Margin	Opposition	Venue	Date
1	146 runs	South Africa	Old Trafford, Manchester, England	12 September 2025
2	137 runs	West Indies	Warner Park, Basseterre, Saint Kitts and Nevis	8 March 2019
3	125 runs	India	Trent Bridge, Nottingham, England	7 July 2026 ‡
4	119 runs	Sri Lanka	Rose Bowl, Southampton, England	15 September 2026
5	116 runs	Afghanistan	Ranasinghe Premadasa Stadium, Colombo, Sri Lanka	21 September 2012 ‡
Last updated: 15 September 2026

==== Greatest win margins (by balls remaining) ====
The greatest winning margin by balls remaining in T20Is was Spain's victory over Isle of Man with 118 balls remaining in the sixth match of the Isle of Man tour of Spain in February 2023. The largest victory recorded by England was during the 2024 T20 World Cup when the defeated Oman by 8 wickets with 101 balls remaining.

Rank	Balls remaining	Margin	Opposition	Venue	Date
1	101	8 wickets	Oman	Sir Vivian Richards Stadium, St John's	13 June 2024 ‡
2	70	6 wickets	West Indies	Dubai International Cricket Stadium, Dubai	23 October 2021 ‡
3	62	10 wickets	United States	Kensington Oval, Bridgetown, Barbados	23 June 2024 ‡
3	62	8 wickets	Sri Lanka	Old Trafford, Manchester, England	19 September 2026
4	57	8 wickets	West Indies	Warner Park, Basseterre, Saint Kitts and Nevis	10 March 2019
Last updated: 19 September 2026

==== Greatest win margins (by wickets) ====
A total of 96 matches have ended with the chasing team winning by 10 wickets, with Indonesia winning by such margins a record six times. England have won a T20I match by this margin on four occasions.

Rank	Margin	Opposition	Venue	Date
1	10 wickets	West Indies	The Oval, London, England	23 September 2011
1	10 wickets	New Zealand	Westpac Stadium, Wellington, New Zealand	15 February 2013
1	10 wickets	India	Adelaide Oval, Adelaide, Australia	10 November 2022 ‡
1	10 wickets	United States	Kensington Oval, Bridgetown, Barbados	23 June 2024 ‡
4	9 wickets	New Zealand	Old Trafford, Manchester, England	13 June 2008
4	9 wickets	South Africa	Rose Bowl, Southampton, England	21 June 2017
4	9 wickets	South Africa	Newlands Cricket Ground, Cape Town, South Africa	1 December 2020
4	9 wickets	India	Bristol County Ground, Bristol, England	9 July 2026
Last updated: 9 July 2026

==== Highest successful run chases ====
South Africa holds the record for the highest successful run chase which they achieved when they scored 259/4 in response to West Indies 258/5, which is also the record for the highest match aggregate. England's highest innings total while chasing is 230/8 in a successful run chase against South Africa at Wankhede Stadium, Mumbai during the 2016 World Twenty20.

Rank	Target	Score	Opposition	Venue	Date
1	230	230/8	South Africa	Wankhede Stadium, Mumbai, India	18 March 2016 ‡
2	223	226/5	South Africa	Centurion Park, Centurion, South Africa	16 February 2020
2	223	226/3	West Indies	National Cricket Stadium, St George's, Grenada	16 December 2023
4	196	199/5	Pakistan	Old Trafford, Manchester, England	30 August 2020
4	197	199/6	West Indies	Bristol County Ground, Bristol, England	8 June 2025
Last updated: 8 June 2025

==== Narrowest win margins (by runs) ====
The narrowest run margin victory is by 1 run, which has been achieved in 34 T20Is, with England winning such games twice.

Rank	Margin	Opposition	Venue	Date
1	1 run	South Africa	New Wanderers Stadium, Johannesburg, South Africa	13 November 2009
1	1 run	West Indies	Kensington Oval, Bridgetown, Barbados	23 January 2022
3	2 runs	New Zealand	Seddon Park, Hamilton, New Zealand	18 February 2018
3	2 runs	South Africa	Kingsmead, Durban, South Africa	14 February 2020
3	2 runs	Australia	Rose Bowl, Southampton, England	4 September 2020
Last updated: 30 January 2022

==== Narrowest win margins (by balls remaining) ====
The narrowest winning margin by balls remaining in T20Is is by winning of the last ball which has been achieved 63 times. England has achieved victory off the last ball twice.

Rank	Balls remaining	Margin	Opposition	Venue	Date
1	0	1 wickets	Australia	Adelaide Oval, Adelaide, Australia	12 January 2011
1	0	6 wickets	India	Wankhede Stadium, Mumbai, India	22 December 2012
3	1	4 wickets	South Africa	Boland Park, Paarl, South Africa	29 November 2020
4	2	7 wickets	West Indies	Trent Bridge, Nottingham, England	24 June 2012
4	2	2 wickets	South Africa	Wankhede Stadium, Mumbai, India	18 March 2016 ‡
4	2	5 wickets	India	Sophia Gardens, Cardiff, Wales	6 July 2018
4	2	3 wickets	Pakistan	Old Trafford, Manchester, England	20 July 2021
4	2	4 wickets	Sri Lanka	Sydney Cricket Ground, Sydney, Australia	5 Nov 2022 ‡
4	2	6 wickets	Sri Lanka	Pallekele International Cricket Stadium, Kandy, Sri Lanka	1 February 2026
Last updated: 1 February 2026

==== Narrowest win margins (by wickets) ====
The narrowest margin of victory by wickets is 1 wicket, which has settled 21 T20Is. England have won a match by this margin once.

Rank	Margin	Opposition	Venue	Date
1	1 wicket	Australia	Adelaide Oval, Adelaide, Australia	12 January 2011
2	2 wickets	South Africa	Wankhede Stadium, Mumbai, India	18 March 2016 ‡
2	2 wickets	Pakistan	Pallekele International Cricket Stadium, Kandy, Sri Lanka	24 February 2026 ‡
4	3 wickets	New Zealand	Darren Sammy National Cricket Stadium, Gros Islet, Saint Lucia	10 May 2010 ‡
4	3 wickets	Pakistan	Old Trafford, Manchester, England	20 July 2021
4	3 wickets	Australia	Sophia Gardens, Cardiff, Wales	13 September 2024
4	3 wickets	West Indies	Darren Sammy National Cricket Stadium, Gros Islet, Saint Lucia	15 November 2024
Last updated: 24 February 2026

==== Greatest loss margins (by runs) ====
England's biggest defeat by runs was against India in the 2012 World Twenty20 at Ranasinghe Premadasa Stadium, Colombo, Sri Lanka during the same match when they recorded their lowest complete inning total.

Rank	Margin	Opposition	Venue	Date
1	150 runs	India	Wankhede Stadium, Mumbai, India	2 February 2025
2	90 runs	India	Ranasinghe Premadasa Stadium, Colombo, Sri Lanka	23 September 2012 ‡
2	90 runs	South Africa	Rose Bowl, Southampton, England	31 July 2022
4	84 runs	South Africa	Centurion Park, Centurion, South Africa	15 November 2009
4	84 runs	Australia	Sydney Cricket Ground, Sydney, Australia	2 February 2014
Last updated: 2 February 2025

==== Greatest loss margins (by balls remaining) ====
The largest defeat in terms of balls remaining suffered by England was against India during their 2025 tour, when they lost by 7 wickets with 43 balls remaining at Eden Gardens.

Rank	Balls remaining	Margin	Opposition	Venue	Date
1	43	7 wickets	India	Eden Gardens, Kolkata, India	22 January 2025
2	33	7 wickets	Australia	Melbourne Cricket Ground, Melbourne, Australia	10 February 2018
3	32	9 wickets	South Africa	New Wanderers Stadium, Johannesburg, South Africa	21 February 2016
4	31	9 wickets	Pakistan	Old Trafford, Manchester, England	7 September 2016
4	31	8 wickets	Australia	Newlands, Cape Town, South Africa	14 September 2007 ‡
4	31	8 wickets	Australia	Melbourne Cricket Ground, Melbourne, Australia	31 January 2014
Last updated: 26 January 2025

==== Greatest loss margins (by wickets) ====
England have lost a T20I match by a margin of 10 wickets on a single occasion.

Rank	Margins	Opposition	Most recent venue	Date
1	10 wickets	Pakistan	National Stadium, Karachi, Pakistan	22 September 2022
2	9 wickets	Sri Lanka	Bristol County Ground, Bristol, England	25 June 2011
2	9 wickets	South Africa	New Wanderers Stadium, Johannesburg, South Africa	21 February 2016
2	9 wickets	Pakistan	Old Trafford, Manchester, England	7 September 2016
2	9 wickets	West Indies	Kensington Oval, Bridgetown, Barbados	22 January 2022
Last updated: 24 September 2022

==== Narrowest loss margins (by runs) ====
The narrowest loss of England in terms of runs is by 1 run, suffered once.

Rank	Margin	Opposition	Venue	Date
1	1 runs	South Africa	Buffalo Park, East London, South Africa	12 February 2020
2	2 runs	Sri Lanka	Rose Bowl, Southampton, England	15 June 2006
3	3 runs	South Africa	Zohur Ahmed Chowdhury Stadium, Chittagong, Bangladesh	29 March 2014 ‡
3	3 runs	South Africa	County Ground, Taunton, England	23 June 2017
3	3 runs	Pakistan	National Stadium, Karachi, Pakistan	25 September 2022
Last updated: 27 September 2022

==== Narrowest loss margins (by balls remaining) ====
England has suffered loss off the last ball twice.

Rank	Balls remaining	Margin	Opposition	Venue	Date
1	0	4 wickets	Netherlands	Lord's, London, England	5 June 2009 ‡
1	0	3 wickets	South Africa	Newlands, Cape Town, South Africa	19 February 2016
3	1	8 wickets	West Indies	Providence Stadium, Providence, Guyana	3 May 2010 ‡
3	1	8 wickets	Australia	Melbourne Cricket Ground, Melbourne, Australia	21 November 2026
5	2	4 wickets	West Indies	Eden Gardens, Kolkata, India	3 April 2016 ‡
Last updated: 21 November 2026

==== Narrowest loss margins (by wickets) ====
The smallest margin of defeat by wickets suffered by England was against India during their 2025 tour, when they lost by 2 wickets at the Chepauk Stadium.

Rank	Margin	Opposition	Venue	Date
1	2 wickets	India	Chepauk Stadium, Chennai, India	25 January 2025
2	3 wickets	South Africa	Newlands, Cape Town, South Africa	19 February 2016
2	3 wickets	Australia	Melbourne Cricket Ground, Melbourne, Australia	21 November 2026
4	4 wickets	Netherlands	Lord's, London, England	5 June 2009 ‡
4	4 wickets	Pakistan	Dubai International Cricket Stadium, Dubai, UAE	20 February 2010
4	4 wickets	West Indies	Eden Gardens, Kolkata, India	3 April 2016 ‡
4	4 wickets	Bangladesh	Sher-e-Bangla National Cricket Stadium, Mirpur, Bangladesh	12 March 2023
4	4 wickets	West Indies	Kensington Oval, Bridgetown, Barbados	12 December 2023
4	4 wickets	West Indies	Brian Lara Cricket Academy, Tarouba, Trinidad and Tobago	21 December 2023
Last updated: 21 November 2026

==== Tied matches ====
A tie can occur when the scores of both teams are equal at the conclusion of play, provided that the side batting last has completed their innings. There have been 45 ties in T20Is history, with England involved in two such games, both of which they won in a Super Over.

Opposition	Venue	Date
Pakistan	Sharjah Cricket Association Stadium, Sharjah, UAE	30 November 2015
New Zealand	Eden Park, Auckland, New Zealand	10 November 2019
Last updated: 15 July 2022

== Individual records ==
=== Batting records ===
==== Most career runs ====
A run is the unit of scoring in cricket. A run is scored when the batsman hits the ball with his bat and with his partner runs the length of the pitch. The world record for most T20I runs is held by Pakistan's Babar Azam, with 4596. Jos Buttler is the leading England batsman on this list.

Rank	Runs	Player	Innings	Period
1	4,384	Jos Buttler†	150	2011–2026
2	2,458	Eoin Morgan	107	2009–2022
3	2,074	Alex Hales	75	2011–2022
4	1,892	Dawid Malan	60	2017–2023
5	1,852	Phil Salt†	61	2022–2026
Last updated: 21 November 2026

==== Highest individual score ====
The world record for highest individual score in a T20I innings is held by Australia's Aaron Finch, who scored 172 against Zimbabwe in 2018. Phil Salt holds the England record with his century against South Africa during their tour of England in 2025.

Rank	Runs	Player	Opposition	Venue	Date
1	141*	Phil Salt	South Africa	Old Trafford, Manchester, England	12 September 2025
2	131	Jos Buttler	India	Rose Bowl, Southampton, England	12 July 2026
3	119	Phil Salt	West Indies	Brian Lara Cricket Academy, Tarouba, Trinidad and Tobago	19 December 2023
4	116*	Alex Hales	Sri Lanka	Zohur Ahmed Chowdhury Stadium, Chittagong, Bangladesh	27 March 2014 ‡
5	114*	Harry Brook	Sri Lanka	Rose Bowl, Southampton, England	15 September 2026
Last updated: 15 September 2026

==== Highest individual score – progression of record ====
Runs	Player	Opponent	Venue	Season
46	Paul Collingwood	Australia	Rose Bowl, Southampton, England	13 June 2005
72	Marcus Trescothick	Sri Lanka	Rose Bowl, Southampton, England	15 June 2006
79	Paul Collingwood	West Indies	The Oval, London, England	28 June 2007
79	Kevin Pietersen	Zimbabwe	Newlands, Cape Town, South Africa	13 September 2007 ‡
85*	Eoin Morgan	South Africa	New Wanderers Stadium, Johannesburg, South Africa	13 November 2009
99	Alex Hales	West Indies	Trent Bridge, Nottingham, England	24 June 2012
99*	Luke Wright	Afghanistan	Ranasinghe Premadasa Stadium, Colombo, Sri Lanka	21 September 2012 ‡
116*	Alex Hales	Sri Lanka	Zohur Ahmed Chowdhury Stadium, Chittagong, Bangladesh	27 March 2014 ‡
119	Phil Salt	West Indies	Brian Lara Cricket Academy, Tarouba, Trinidad and Tobago	19 December 2023
141*	Phil Salt	South Africa	Old Trafford, Manchester, England	12 September 2025
Last updated: 12 September 2025

==== Highest career average ====
A batsman's batting average is the total number of runs they have scored divided by the number of times they have been dismissed. The world record for highest T20I batting average (minimum 25 innings) is held by India's Virat Kohli, who averaged 48.7. The England batsman with the highest average is Kevin Pietersen.

Rank	Average	Player	Innings	Not out	Runs	Period
1	37.9	Kevin Pietersen	36	5	1,176	2005–2013
2	36.8	Harry Brook†	63	15	1,767	2022–2026
3	36.4	Dawid Malan	60	8	1,892	2017–2023
4	35.7	Joe Root	30	5	893	2012–2019
5	34.8	Jos Buttler†	150	24	4,384	2011–2026
Qualification: 25 innings. Last updated: 21 November 2026

==== Most half-centuries ====
A half-century is a score of between 50 and 99 runs. Statistically, once a batsman's score reaches 100, it is no longer considered a half-century but a century. The world record for most T20I half-centuries is held by Pakistan's Babar Azam, with 39. Jos Buttler has the most half-centuries for England.

Rank	Half-centuries	Player	Innings	Period
1	30	Jos Buttler†	150	2011–2026
2	16	Dawid Malan	60	2017–2023
3	14	Eoin Morgan	107	2009–2022
4	12	Alex Hales	75	2011–2022
5	10	Jonny Bairstow	72	2011–2024
5	10	Phil Salt†	61	2022-2026
Last updated: 21 November 2026

==== Most centuries ====
A century is a score of 100 or more runs in a single innings. The world record for most T20I centuries is shared by Australia's Glenn Maxwell and India's Rohit Sharma, with five each. Phil Salt has scored the most centuries for England.

Rank	Centuries	Player	Innings	Period
1	4	Phil Salt†	61	2022–2026
2	2	Harry Brook†	63	2022–2026
2	2	Jos Buttler†	150	2011–2026
2	1	Jacob Bethell†	32	2024–2026
2	1	Alex Hales	75	2011–2022
2	1	Liam Livingstone	47	2017–2025
2	1	Dawid Malan	60	2017–2023
Last updated: 21 November 2026

==== Most sixes ====
The world record for most sixes scored in T20Is is held by Austria's Karanbir Singh, with 214. Jos Buttler has hit the most sixes for England.

Rank	Sixes	Player	Innings	Period
1	192	Jos Buttler†	150	2011–2026
2	120	Eoin Morgan	107	2009–2022
3	90	Harry Brook†	63	2022–2026
4	87	Phil Salt†	61	2022–2026
5	76	Jonny Bairstow	72	2011–2024
Last updated: 21 November 2026

==== Most fours ====
The world record for most fours scored in T20Is is held by Pakistan's Babar Azam, with 477. Jos Buttler has hit the most fours for England.

Rank	Fours	Player	Innings	Period
1	408	Jos Buttler†	150	2011–2026
2	225	Alex Hales	75	2011–2022
3	194	Dawid Malan	60	2017–2023
4	187	Phil Salt†	61	2022–2026
5	186	Eoin Morgan	107	2009–2022
Last updated: 21 November 2026

==== Highest strike rates ====
The world record for highest strike rate in T20Is (minimum 500 balls faced) is held by India's Abhishek Sharma, who strikes at 196.4. Harry Brook is the highest England batsman on the list.

Rank	Strike rate	Player	Runs	Balls faced	Period
1	166.7	Harry Brook†	1,767	1,060	2022–2026
2	163.6	Phil Salt†	1,852	1,132	2022–2026
3	151.4	Tom Banton†	836	552	2019–2026
4	150.9	Jacob Bethell†	786	521	2024–2026
5	150.1	Jos Buttler†	4,384	2,920	2011–2026
Qualification: 500 balls faced. Last updated: 21 November 2026

==== Highest strike rates in an innings ====
The world record for highest strike rates in a T20I innings (minimum 25 runs scored) is held by Nepal's Dipendra Airee, who struck at 520.0 against Mongolia in 2023. The England record is held by Harry Brook, who struck at 442.9 against the West Indies during England's tour there in 2023.

Rank	Strike rate	Player	Runs	Balls Faced	Opposition	Venue	Date
1	442.85	Harry Brook	31*	7	West Indies	National Stadium, St. George's, Grenada	16 December 2023
2	354.54	Moeen Ali	39	11	South Africa	Kingsmead, Durban, South Africa	14 February 2020
3	320.00	Jos Buttler	32*	10	South Africa	Edgbaston, Birmingham, England	12 September 2012
4	300.00	Chris Jordan	27*	9	West Indies	Kensington Oval, Bridgetown, Barbados	13 March 2014
4	300.00	Harry Brook	36	12	Sri Lanka	Pallekele International Cricket Stadium, Kandy, Sri Lanka	1 February 2026
Minimum of 25 runs scored Last updated: 1 February 2026

==== Most runs in a calendar year ====
The world record for most T20I runs scored in a calendar year is held by Austria's Karanbir Singh, who scored 1488 runs in 2025. Harry Brook has scored 755 runs so far in 2026, the most for an England batsman in a single year.

Rank	Runs	Player	Innings	Year
1	755	Harry Brook†	19	2026
2	589	Jos Buttler	14	2021
3	515	Moeen Ali	22	2022
4	515	Jos Buttler†	18	2026
5	509	Dawid Malan	18	2022
Last updated: 21 November 2026

==== Most runs in a series ====
The world record for most runs scored in a single T20I series is held by Eswatini's Adil Butt, who scored 466 runs at the 2026 Eswatini T20 Tri-Series. Phil Salt has scored the most runs in a single series for an England batsmen, with 331 runs in the England tour of the West Indies in 2023–24.

Rank	Runs	Player	Innings	Series
1	331	Phil Salt	5	England in the West Indies in 2023–24
2	280	Jacob Bethell	8	2026 T20 World Cup
3	269	Jos Buttler	6	2021 ICC T20 World Cup
4	249	Joe Root	6	2016 ICC World Twenty20
5	248	Kevin Pietersen	6	2010 ICC World Twenty20
Last updated: 5 March 2026

==== Most ducks ====
A duck refers to a batsman being dismissed without scoring a run. The world record for most T20I ducks scored is jointly held by Indonesia's Danilson Hawoe and Sri Lanka's Dasun Shanaka, with 16 each. The England record is held by Jos Buttler, who has scored 11 ducks.

Rank	Ducks	Player	Innings	Period
1	11	Jos Buttler†	150	2011–2026
2	9	Moeen Ali	75	2014–2024
2	9	Luke Wright	45	2007–2014
4	8	Phil Salt†	61	2022–2026
5	7	Jason Roy	64	2014–2022
Last updated: 21 November 2026

=== Bowling records ===
==== Most career wickets ====
A bowler takes the wicket of a batsman when the form of dismissal is bowled, caught, leg before wicket, stumped or hit wicket. If the batsman is dismissed by run out, obstructing the field, handling the ball, hitting the ball twice or timed out the bowler does not receive credit. The world record for most T20I wickets is held by Afghanistan's Rashid Khan, with 200. Adil Rashid is the England bowler who has taken the most wickets.

Rank	Wickets	Player	Matches	Period
1	172	Adil Rashid†	154	2009–2026
2	108	Chris Jordan	95	2014–2024
3	74	Sam Curran†	81	2019–2026
5	68	Jofra Archer †	51	2019–2026
4	65	Stuart Broad	56	2006–2014
Last updated: 21 November 2026

==== Best figures in an innings ====
Bowling figures refers to the number of the wickets a bowler has taken and the number of runs conceded. The world record for best T20I innings figures is held by Bhutan's Sonam Yeshey, who took 8/7 against Myanmar in 2025. Sam Curran took 5/10 against Afghanistan at the 2022 T20 World Cup, the best figures for an England player.

Rank	Figures	Player	Opposition	Venue	Date
1	5/10	Sam Curran	Afghanistan	Perth Stadium, Perth, Australia	22 October 2022 ‡
2	4/2	Adil Rashid	West Indies	Dubai International Cricket Stadium, Dubai	23 October 2021 ‡
3	4/6	Chris Jordan	West Indies	Warner Park, Basseterre, Saint Kitts and Nevis	8 March 2019
4	4/7	David Willey	West Indies	Warner Park, Basseterre, Saint Kitts and Nevis	10 March 2019
5	4/10	Ravi Bopara	West Indies	The Oval, London, England	23 September 2011
5	4/10	Chris Jordan	United States	Kensington Oval, Bridgetown, Barbados	23 June 2024 ‡
Last updated: 23 June 2024

==== Best figures in an innings – progression of record ====
Figures	Player	Opposition	Venue	Date
4/24	Jon Lewis	Australia	Rose Bowl, Southampton, England	13 June 2005
4/22	Paul Collingwood	Sri Lanka	Rose Bowl, Southampton, England	15 June 2006
4/22	Jade Dernbach	India	Old Trafford, Manchester, England	31 August 2011
4/10	Ravi Bopara	West Indies	The Oval, London, England	23 September 2011
4/6	Chris Jordan	West Indies	Warner Park, Basseterre, Saint Kitts and Nevis	8 March 2019
4/2	Adil Rashid	West Indies	Dubai International Cricket Stadium, Dubai	23 October 2021 ‡
5/10	Sam Curran	Afghanistan	Perth Stadium, Perth, Australia	22 October 2022 ‡
Last updated: 22 October 2022

==== Best career average ====
A bowler's bowling average is the total number of runs they have conceded divided by the number of wickets they have taken. Thailand's Jandre Coetzee holds the record for the best career average in T20Is (minimum 25 wickets), with 9.2. Graeme Swann, with an average of 16.8, is the highest ranked England bowler.

Rank	Average	Player	Wickets	Runs	Period
1	16.8	Graeme Swann	51	859	2008–2012
2	18.1	Jamie Overton†	32	578	2024–2026
3	20.2	Mark Wood†	54	1093	2015–2025
4	21.6	Steven Finn	27	583	2011–2015
5	22.9	Liam Dawson†	41	939	2016–2026
Qualification: 25 wickets. Last updated: Last updated: 21 November 2026

==== Best career economy rate ====
A bowler's economy rate is the total number of runs they have conceded divided by the number of overs they have bowled. Uganda's Frank Nsubuga, holds the T20I record for the best career economy rate, with 4.7. Graeme Swann, with a rate of 6.4 runs per over conceded over his 39-match T20I career, is the highest England player on the list.

Rank	Economy rate	Player	Runs	Balls	Period
1	6.4	Graeme Swann	859	810	2008–2012
2	7.6	Adil Rashid†	4036	3202	2009–2026
3	7.6	Stuart Broad	1491	1173	2006–2014
4	7.8	Liam Dawson†	939	721	2016–2026
5	8.0	Tim Bresnan	887	663	2006–2014
Qualification: 500 balls bowled. Last updated: 21 November 2026

==== Best career strike rate ====
A bowler's strike rate is the total number of balls they have bowled divided by the number of wickets they have taken. The bowler with the best T20I career strike rate (minimum 25 wickets taken) is Thailand's Phanuphong Thongsa, with a strike rate of 9.5 balls per wicket. Jamie Overton has the lowest strike rate among England bowlers.

Rank	Strike rate	Player	Wickets	Balls	Period
1	13.4	Jamie Overton†	32	431	2024–2026
2	14.3	Mark Wood†	54	776	2015–2025
3	15.8	Graeme Swann	51	810	2008–2012
4	16.5	Jofra Archer†	68	1126	2019–2026
5	16.9	David Willey	51	865	2015–2022
Qualification: 25 wickets. Last updated: 21 November 2026

==== Most hauls of four or more wickets in an innings ====
Rashid Khan of Afghanistan has taken four or more wickets on eleven occasions, the most among all international bowlers. Chris Jordan and Adil Rashid are the only two players for England to have taken four wickets more than once.

Rank	Four-wicket hauls	Player	Matches	Period
1	4	Chris Jordan	95	2014–2024
1	4	Adil Rashid†	154	2009–2026
3	1	16 players		2005–2026
Last updated: 21 November 2026

==== Best economy rates in an innings ====
On sixteen occasions, bowlers have bowled at least two full overs in T20Is without conceding a run, for an economy rate of 0.00. The England record for best economy rate in an innings (minimum two full overs bowled) is held by Adil Rashid, who bowled a spell of 2 runs for 4 wickets in 2.2 overs against West Indies in the 2021 T20 World Cup for an economy rate of 0.85.

Rank	Economy	Player	Overs	Runs	Opposition	Venue	Date
1	0.85	Adil Rashid	2.2	2	West Indies	Dubai International Cricket Stadium, Dubai	23 October 2021 ‡
2	2.00	Samit Patel	3	6	Afghanistan	Ranasinghe Premadasa Stadium, Colombo, Sri Lanka	21 September 2012 ‡
2	2.00	Chris Woakes	2	4	Australia	Manuka Oval, Canberra, Australia	14 October 2022
4	2.25	Chris Woakes	4	9	Sri Lanka	Rose Bowl, Southampton, England	26 June 2021
5	2.33	David Willey	3	7	West Indies	Warner Park, Basseterre, Saint Kitts and Nevis	10 March 2019
Qualification: 12 balls bowled. Last updated: 27 October 2021

==== Best strike rates in an innings ====
The record for best strike rate in an innings, when a minimum of 2 wickets are taken by the player, is shared by Greece's Georgios Galanis, Japan's Benjamin Ito-Davis and the UAE's Muhammad Zuhaib, who each took two wickets in 0.2 overs for a strike rate of 1.0. Will Jacks, Chris Jordan, Darren Maddy and Joe Root hold the England record for best strike rate in an innings, when a minimum of 2 wickets are taken by the player, at 3.0.

Rank	Strike rate	Player	Deliveries	Wickets	Opposition	Venue	Date
1	3.00	Will Jacks	6	2	South Africa	Old Trafford, Manchester, England	12 September 2025
1	3.00	Chris Jordan	12	4	West Indies	Warner Park, Basseterre, Saint Kitts and Nevis	8 March 2019
1	3.00	Darren Maddy	6	2	New Zealand	Kingsmead, Durban, South Africa	18 September 2007
1	3.00	Joe Root	6	2	West Indies	Eden Gardens, Kolkata, India	3 April 2016
5	3.50	Adil Rashid	14	4	West Indies	Dubai International Cricket Stadium, Dubai, UAE	23 October 2021
Last updated: 12 September 2025

==== Worst figures in an innings ====
The worst figures in a T20I belong to Gambia's Musa Jobarteh, who bowled a spell of 0/93 against Zimbabwe in 2024. The worst figures by an England player belong to Stuart Broad, who bowled a spell of 0/60 during the 2007 World Twenty20 against India at at Kingsmead, Durban, South Africa.

Rank	Figures	Player	Overs	Opposition	Venue	Date
1	0/60	Stuart Broad	4	India	Kingsmead, Durban, South Africa	19 September 2007 ‡
2	0/57	Chris Jordan	4	India	Narendra Modi Stadium, Ahmedabad, India	20 March 2021
3	0/53	Sam Curran	4	India	Wankhede Stadium, Mumbai, India	5 March 2026
3	0/53	Danny Briggs	4	Australia	Bellerive Oval, Hobart, Australia	29 January 2014
3	0/53	Stuart Broad	4	New Zealand	Seddon Park, Hamilton, New Zealand	12 February 2013
3	0/53	Mark Wood	4	India	Narendra Modi Stadium, Ahmedabad, India	20 March 2021
Last updated: 5 March 2026

==== Most runs conceded in a match ====
The most runs conceded in a T20I is 93, by Gambia's Musa Jobarteh against Zimbabwe in 2024. The English record is held by James Anderson, who conceded 64 against Australia in 2007.

Rank	Figures	Player	Overs	Opposition	Venue	Date
1	1/64	James Anderson	4	Australia	Sydney Cricket Ground, Sydney, Australia	9 January 2007
2	1/63	Brydon Carse	4	West Indies	Rose Bowl, Southampton, England	10 June 2025
3	1/61	Jofra Archer	4	India	Wankhede Stadium, Mumbai, India	5 March 2026
3	1/61	Sajid Mahmood	4	South Africa	Centurion Park, Centurion, South Africa	15 November 2009
4	0/60	Stuart Broad	4	India	Kingsmead, Durban, South Africa	19 September 2007 ‡
4	1/60	Jofra Archer	4	India	Chepauk Stadium, Chennai, India	25 January 2025
Last updated: 6 March 2025

==== Most wickets in a calendar year ====
The record for most T20I wickets taken in a calendar year is held by Bahrain's Ali Dawood, who took 63 in 2025. The England record is held by Adil Rashid, who has taken 27 wickets in 2026 so far.

Rank	Wickets	Player	Matches	Year
1	27	Adil Rashid†	20	2026
2	25	Sam Curran	19	2022
3	24	Jofra Archer†	16	2026
4	23	Adil Rashid	16	2021
5	23	Liam Dawson†	19	2026
Last updated: 21 November 2026

==== Most wickets in a series ====
The record for most wickets taken by a bowler in a T20I single series is held by Uganda's Alpesh Ramjani, who took 25 wickets in 11 matches at the 2023 East Africa Cup. The England record for most wickets in a series is shared by Sam Curran, who took 13 wickets during the 2022 T20 World Cup, and Adil Rashid, who took 13 wickets during the 2026 T20 World Cup.

Rank	Wickets	Player	Matches	Series
1	13	Sam Curran	6	2022 T20 World Cup
1	13	Adil Rashid	8	2026 T20 World Cup
3	11	Jofra Archer	8	2026 T20 World Cup
4	10	Jofra Archer	8	2024 T20 World Cup
4	10	Liam Dawson	8	2026 T20 World Cup
4	10	Chris Jordan	5	2024 T20 World Cup
4	10	Adil Rashid	8	2024 T20 World Cup
4	10	Ryan Sidebottom	7	2010 World Twenty20
4	10	Graeme Swann	7	2010 World Twenty20
4	10	David Willey	6	2016 World Twenty20
Last updated: 5 March 2026

=== Wicket-keeping records ===
The wicket-keeper is a specialist fielder who stands behind the stumps being guarded by the batsman on strike, and is the only member of the fielding side allowed to wear gloves and leg pads. Many players have played matches both as a wicket-keeper and as a regular fielder; in the records below, the number of innings refers to those where the player was the nominated wicket-keeper at the start of the match, and the number of catches only include those taken as a wicket-keeper.

==== Most career dismissals ====
A wicket-keeper can be credited with the dismissal of a batsman in two ways, caught or stumped. A fair catch is taken when the ball is caught fully within the field of play without it bouncing after the ball has touched the striker's bat or glove holding the bat, while a stumping occurs when the wicket-keeper puts down the wicket while the batsman is out of his ground and not attempting a run. Jos Buttler is the highest-ranked England player, in second place, in the list of most dismissals in T20Is as a wicket-keeper, the list being headed by South African Quinton de Kock with 117 dismissals (98 catches and 19 stumpings).

Rank	Dismissals	Player	Innings	Period
1	112 (Note: Cricinfo lists Buttler as having made 1 catch as a fielder whilst being the designated keeper, whilst their description of the catch says he was the wicket-keeper at the time. Their wicket-keeping totals (both catches and total dismissals) fail to include this dismissal; if this catch is counted towards his wicket-keeping total it gives him a total of 91 catches and 113 dismissals, which are the totals given in other sources.)	Jos Buttler †	133	2012–2026
2	20	Craig Kieswetter	23	2010–2012
3	13 (Note: Cricinfo list Salt as making 2 catches as a fielder in a match where he took over as wicketkeeper part of the way through the fielding innings. The commentary makes it clear he was keeper at the time of the catches, after Jamie Smith had left the field due to injury. If these are counted towards his wicketkeeping stats, he has a total of 13 catches and 15 dismissals.)	Jonny Bairstow	12	2012–2024
3	13	Phil Salt †	20	2022–2025
5	9	Matt Prior	10	2007–2010
Last updated: 19 September 2026

==== Most career catches ====
Buttler has taken the most catches in T20Is as a wicket-keeper for England, second overall to Quinton de Kock, who has taken 98.

Rank	Catches	Player	Innings	Period
1	90	Jos Buttler†	133	2012–2026
2	17	Craig Kieswetter	23	2010–2012
3	12	Jonny Bairstow	12	2012–2023
4	11	Phil Salt†	20	2022–2025
5	6	Matt Prior	10	2007–2010
Last updated: 19 September 2026

==== Most career stumpings ====
Buttler has made the most stumpings in T20Is for England, with Mahendra Singh Dhoni of India heading the all-time list with 34.

Rank	Stumpings	Player	Innings	Period
1	22	Jos Buttler†	133	2012–2026
2	3	James Foster	5	2009–2009
2	3	Craig Kieswetter	23	2010–2012
2	3	Matt Prior	10	2007–2010
5	2	Sam Billings	10	2015–2022
5	2	Phil Salt†	20	2022–2025
Last updated: 19 September 2026

==== Most dismissals in an innings ====
Mitchell Hay of New Zealand is the only wicket-keeper to have made six dismissals in a single innings in a T20I. Jos Buttler is the only England wicket-keeper to have made 5 dismissals in an innings.

Rank	Dismissals	Player	Opposition	Venue	Date
1	5	Jos Buttler	India	Trent Bridge, Nottingham, England	7 July 2026
2	4	Matt Prior	South Africa	Newlands, Cape Town, South Africa	16 September 2007
2	3	Craig Kieswetter	India	Old Trafford, Manchester, England	31 August 2011
2	3	Sam Billings	Pakistan	Dubai International Cricket Stadium, Dubai, UAE	26 November 2015
2	3	Jos Buttler	5 separate occasions		
Last updated: 12 July 2026

==== Most dismissals in a series ====
The record for most dismissals taken by a wicket-keeper in a single series is 14, jointly held by four cricketers. The England record is held by Jos Buttler, who made 9 dismissals (all catches) in the 2022 T20 World Cup.

Rank	Dismissals	Player	Innings	Series
1	11	Jos Buttler	5	India in England in 2026
2	9	Jos Buttler	6	2022 T20 World Cup
3	7	Jos Buttler	8	2024 T20 World Cup
4	6	Jos Buttler	8	2026 T20 World Cup
4	6	Jos Buttler	3	India in England in 2022
4	6	James Foster	5	2009 ICC World Twenty20
Last updated: 12 July 2026

=== Fielding records ===
==== Most career catches ====
Caught is one of the nine methods a batsman can be dismissed in cricket. (Note: In 2017, The Laws of Cricket were amended, reducing the methods of dismissals from ten to nine, with handled the ball now covered as part of obstructing the field.) Only catches made as a fielder are included, those made as a wicket-keeper or as a substitute are excluded. South Africa's David Miller holds the record for the most catches in T20Is by a non-wicket-keeper with 86. Chris Jordan is the leading catcher for England, with 48.

Rank	Catches	Player	Innings	Period
1	48	Chris Jordan	94	2014–2024
2	46	Eoin Morgan	114	2009–2022
3	43	Adil Rashid†	152	2009–2026
4	41	Harry Brook†	71	2022–2026
5	39	Alex Hales	74	2011–2022
Last updated: 21 November 2026

==== Most catches in an innings ====
The feat of taking five catches in an innings has been achieved three times in T20Is. The record for an England player is four catches, achieved by Jofra Archer against South Africa in 2025.

Rank	Dismissals	Player	Opposition	Venue	Date
1	4	Jofra Archer	South Africa	Old Trafford, Manchester, England	12 September 2025
2	3	Tom Banton	Italy	Eden Gardens, Kolkata, India	16 February 2026
2	3	Tom Banton	India	Old Trafford, Manchester, England	4 July 2026
2	3	Stuart Broad	Pakistan	Dubai International Cricket Stadium, Dubai, UAE	19 February 2010
2	3	Jordan Cox	New Zealand	Hagley Oval, Christchurch, New Zealand	20 October 2025
2	3	Ben Duckett	West Indies	Riverside Ground, Chester-le-Street, England	6 June 2025
2	3	Chris Jordan	West Indies	Warner Park, Basseterre, Saint Kitts and Nevis	10 March 2019
2	3	Chris Jordan	Sri Lanka	Sophia Gardens, Cardiff, Wales	23 June 2021
2	3	Liam Livingstone	Pakistan	Melbourne Cricket Ground, Melbourne, Australia	13 November 2022 ‡
2	3	Eoin Morgan	Pakistan	Dubai International Cricket Stadium, Dubai, UAE	20 February 2010
2	3	Kevin Pietersen	Australia	Rose Bowl, Southampton, England	13 June 2005
2	3	Ben Stokes	West Indies	Eden Gardens, Kolkata, India	3 April 2016
2	3	Chris Woakes	Bangladesh	Sheikh Zayed Cricket Stadium, Abu Dhabi, UAE	27 October 2021
Last updated: 4 July 2026

==== Most catches in a series ====
The world record for most catches taken by a fielder in a single T20I series is held by New Zealand's Glenn Phillips, who took 11 at the 2026 T20 World Cup.

Rank	Catches	Player	Innings	Series
1	10	Tom Banton	8	2026 T20 World Cup
2	7	Harry Brook	8	2024 T20 World Cup
3	6	Tom Banton	5	India in England in 2026
3	6	Will Jacks	8	2026 T20 World Cup
3	6	Liam Livingstone	6	2022 T20 World Cup
3	6	Jamie Overton	6	2026 T20 World Cup
Last updated: 12 July 2026

=== Other records ===
==== Most career matches ====
The world record for most T20Is played is jointly held by England's Jos Buttler and Ireland's Paul Stirling, with 163 each.

Rank	Matches	Player	Period
1	163	Jos Buttler†	2011–2026
2	154	Adil Rashid†	2009–2026
3	115	Eoin Morgan	2009–2022
4	95	Chris Jordan	2014–2024
5	92	Moeen Ali	2014–2024
Last updated: 21 November 2026

==== Most consecutive career matches ====
Malaysia's Syed Aziz holds the record for the most consecutive T20I matches played with 126. Adil Rashid holds the England record with 45.

Rank	Matches	Player	Period
1	45	Adil Rashid	2022–2024
2	44	Moeen Ali	2021–2023
3	39	Jos Buttler	2024–2026
4	37	Jos Buttler	2011–2014
5	36†	Adil Rashid†	2024–2026
Last updated: 21 November 2026

==== Most matches as captain ====
The record for most T20Is played as captain is held by Namibia's Gerhard Erasmus, with 91. Eoin Morgan holds the England record for most T20Is played as captain, with 72.

Rank	Matches	Player	Won	Lost	Tied	NR	Win %	Period
1	72	Eoin Morgan	42 (Note: as well as 2 tied matches in which England won the super overs)	27	2	1	58.3	2012–2022
2	51	Jos Buttler†	26	22	0	3	51.0	2015–2025
3	30	Paul Collingwood	17	11	0	2	56.7	2007–2011
4	28	Harry Brook†	21	4	0	3	75.0	2025–2026
5	27	Stuart Broad	11	15	0	1	40.7	2011–2014
Last updated: 21 November 2026

==== Youngest players on debut ====
The youngest player to play in a T20I match was Marian Gherasim, who represented Romania at the age of 14 years and 16 days.

Rank	Age	Player	Opposition	Venue	Date
1	18 years and 211 days	Rehan Ahmed	Bangladesh	Sher-e-Bangla National Cricket Stadium, Mirpur, Bangladesh	12 March 2023
2	20 years and 65 days	Stuart Broad	Pakistan	Bristol County Ground, Bristol, England	28 August 2006
3	20 years and 111 days	Ben Stokes	West Indies	The Oval, London, England	23 September 2011
4	20 years and 123 days	Mason Crane	South Africa	Rose Bowl, Southampton, England	21 June 2017
5	20 years and 357 days	Jacob Bethell	Australia	Rose Bowl, Southampton, England	11 September 2024
Last updated: 11 September 2024

==== Oldest players on debut ====
The record for oldest cricketer on T20I debut is held by Andrew Brownlee, who was 62 years and 145 days old when he made his debut for the Falkland Islands.

Rank	Age	Player	Opposition	Venue	Date
1	36 years and 80 days	Paul Nixon	Australia	Sydney Cricket Ground, Sydney, Australia	9 January 2007
2	34 years and 268 days	Darren Gough	Australia	Rose Bowl, Southampton, England	13 June 2005
3	34 years and 219 days	Richard Gleeson	India	Edgbaston, Birmingham, England	9 July 2022
4	34 years and 142 days	Jeremy Snape	South Africa	Newlands, Cape Town, South Africa	16 September 2007 ‡
5	33 years and 233 days	Michael Carberry	Sri Lanka	The Oval, London, England	20 May 2014
Last updated: 15 July 2022

==== Oldest players ====
Costa Rica's Foster Morgan is the oldest player to appear in a T20I match, at 65 years and 334 days.

Rank	Age	Player	Opposition	Venue	Date
1	38 years and 277 days	Adil Rashid†	Australia	Melbourne Cricket Ground, Melbourne, Australia	21 November 2026
2	37 years and 9 days	Moeen Ali	India	Providence Stadium, Providence, Guyana	27 June 2024
3	36 years and 265 days	Liam Dawson†	Australia	Melbourne Cricket Ground, Melbourne, Australia	21 November 2026
4	36 years and 80 days	Paul Nixon	Australia	Sydney Cricket Ground, Sydney, Australia	9 January 2007
5	36 years and 11 days	Jos Buttler†	Sri Lanka	Old Trafford, Manchester, England	19 September 2026
Last updated: 21 November 2026

== Partnership records ==
In cricket, two batsmen are always present at the crease batting together in a partnership. This partnership will continue until one of them is dismissed, retires or the innings comes to a close.

=== Highest partnerships by wicket ===
A wicket partnership describes the number of runs scored by the two batsmen before that number wicket in the innings falls, or the innings finishes before that wicket falls.

Wicket	Runs	First batsman	Second batsman	Opposition	Venue	Date
1st wicket	170*	Jos Buttler	Alex Hales	India	Adelaide Oval, Adelaide, Australia	10 November 2022 ‡
2nd wicket	233	Jos Buttler	Harry Brook	India	Rose Bowl, Southampton, England	11 July 2026
3rd wicket	182	Dawid Malan	Eoin Morgan	New Zealand	McLean Park, Napier, New Zealand	8 November 2019
4th wicket	139*	Ben Duckett	Harry Brook	Pakistan	National Stadium, Karachi, Pakistan	23 September 2022
5th wicket	102	Owais Shah	Paul Collingwood	New Zealand	Lancaster Park, Christchurch, New Zealand	7 February 2008
6th wicket	69*	Owais Shah	Dimitri Mascarenhas	West Indies	The Oval, London, England	29 June 2007
7th wicket	91	Michael Yardy	Paul Collingwood	West Indies	The Oval, London, England	28 June 2007
8th wicket	57*	David Willey	Moeen Ali	Afghanistan	Arun Jaitley Stadium, Delhi, India	23 March 2016 ‡
9th wicket	22	James Tredwell	Steven Finn	New Zealand	Seddon Park, Hamilton, New Zealand	12 February 2013
10th wicket	24*	Danny Briggs	Ravi Bopara	Australia	Bellerive Oval, Hobart, Australia	29 January 2014
10th wicket	24*	Adil Rashid	Mark Wood	India	Niranjan Shah Stadium, Rajkot, India	28 January 2025
Last updated: 12 July 2026

=== Highest partnerships by runs ===
The world record for highest single partnership in a T20I is held by Japan's Kendel Kadowaki-Fleming and Lachlan Yamamoto-Lake, who had an unbeaten partnership of 258* against China in 2024. The England record is held by Jos Buttler and Harry Brook, who had a partnership of 233 against India in 2026.

Wicket	Runs	First batsman	Second batsman	Opposition	Venue	Date
2nd wicket	233	Jos Buttler	Harry Brook	India	Rose Bowl, Southampton, England	11 July 2026
3rd wicket	182	Dawid Malan	Eoin Morgan	New Zealand	McLean Park, Napier, New Zealand	8 November 2019
1st wicket	170*	Jos Buttler	Alex Hales	India	Adelaide Oval, Adelaide, Australia	10 November 2022 ‡
2nd wicket	167*	Jos Buttler	Dawid Malan	South Africa	Newlands Cricket Ground, Cape Town, South Africa	1 December 2020
2nd wicket	159	Alex Hales	Ravi Bopara	West Indies	Trent Bridge, Nottingham, England	24 June 2012
Last updated: 12 July 2026

=== Highest overall partnership runs by a pair ===
The world record for highest overall partnership T20I runs by a pair is held by Pakistan's Babar Azam and Mohammad Rizwan, who scored 3300 runs together between 2019 and 2024. The England record is held by Jos Buttler and Phil Salt, who have scored 1397 runs together since 2022.

Rank	Runs	Innings	Players	Highest	Average	100/50	Period
1	1397	40	Jos Buttler and Phil Salt†	126	35.8	4/6	2022–2026
2	991	32	Jos Buttler and Jason Roy	95	32.0	0/7	2016–2022
3	831	19	Jos Buttler and Dawid Malan	167*	46.2	2/4	2017–2023
4	712	19	Harry Brook and Jos Buttler†	233	37.5	2/1	2022–2026
5	705	18	Alex Hales and Michael Lumb	143*	41.5	2/3	2012–2014
An asterisk (*) signifies an unbroken partnership (i.e. neither of the batsmen was dismissed before either the end of the allotted overs or the required score being reached). Last updated: 19 September 2026

== Umpiring records ==
=== Most matches umpired ===
An umpire in cricket is a person who officiates the match according to the Laws of Cricket. Two umpires adjudicate the match on the field, whilst a third umpire has access to video replays, and a fourth umpire looks after the match balls and other duties. The records below are only for on-field umpires. Malaysia's Viswanadan Kalidas holds the record for the most T20I matches umpired with 117. The most experienced English umpire is Alex Wharf.

Rank	Matches	Umpire	Period
1	52	Alex Wharf†	2018–2026
2	46	Richard Kettleborough†	2009–2026
3	43	Richard Illingworth†	2010–2026
4	37	Ian Gould	2006–2016
5	32	Mike Burns†	2020–2026
5	32	Andrew Elliott†	2022–2026
5	32	Nigel Llong	2005–2016
Last updated: 21 November 2026

== See also ==
- List of England Test cricket records
- List of England One Day International cricket records
- List of Twenty20 International records
