= List of England One Day International cricket records =

One Day International (ODI) cricket is List-A cricket played between international cricket teams who are Full Members of the International Cricket Council (ICC), as well as the top four Associate members. ODIs consist of one innings per team, having a limit in the number of overs, currently 50 overs per innings – although in the past this has been 55 or 60 overs. As ODI cricket is the international form of List-A cricket, statistics and records set in ODI matches also count toward List-A records. The earliest match recognised as an ODI was played between England and Australia in January 1971, since when there have been over 5,000 ODIs played by 29 teams. This article is a list of ODI records for the England cricket team.

== Key ==
The top five records are listed for each category, except for the team wins, losses, draws and ties, all round records and the partnership records. Tied records for fifth place are also included. Explanations of the general symbols and cricketing terms used in the list are given below. Specific details are provided in each category where appropriate. All records include matches played for England only, and are correct as of November 2026.

Key
Symbol	Meaning
†	Player or umpire is currently active in ODI cricket
‡	Event took place during a Cricket World Cup
*	Player remained not out or partnership remained unbroken
♠	One Day International cricket record
Date	Starting date of the Test match
Innings	Number of innings played
Matches	Number of matches played
Opposition	The team England was playing against
Period	The time period when the player was active in Test cricket
Player	The player involved in the record
Venue	One Day International cricket ground where the match was played

== Team records ==
=== Overall record ===
Matches	Won	Lost	Tied	NR	Win %
836	416	380	9	31	49.8
Last Updated: 18 November 2026

=== Team wins, losses, draws and ties ===
As of November 2026, England has played 836 ODI matches resulting in 416 victories, 380 defeats, 9 ties and 31 no results for an overall winning percentage of 49.8.

Opponent	Matches	Won	Lost	Tied	No Result	% Won	First	Last
Full Members
Afghanistan	4	2	2	0	0	50.0	2015	2025
Australia	165	67	93	2	3	40.6	1971	2026
Bangladesh	25	20	5	0	0	80.0	2000	2023
India	113	46	62	2	3	40.7	1974	2026
Ireland	15	11	2	0	2	73.3	2006	2023
New Zealand	99	44	48	3	4	44.4	1973	2025
Pakistan	94	57	34	0	3	60.6	1974	2026
South Africa	74	31	36	1	5	41.9	1992	2025
Sri Lanka	87	43	40	1	3	49.4	1982	2026
West Indies	111	57	48	0	6	51.4	1973	2025
Zimbabwe	30	21	8	0	1	70.0	1992	2004
Associate Members
Canada	2	2	0	0	0	100.0	1979	2007
East Africa	1	1	0	0	0	100.0	1975	1975
Kenya	2	2	0	0	0	100.0	1999	2007
Namibia	1	1	0	0	0	100.0	2003	2003
Netherlands	7	7	0	0	0	100.0	1996	2023
Scotland	5	3	1	0	1	60.0	2008	2018
United Arab Emirates	1	1	0	0	0	100.0	1996	1996
Total	836	416	380	9	31	49.8	1971	2026
Statistics are correct as of 18 November 2026.

=== Team scoring records ===
==== Most runs in an innings ====
The highest innings total scored in ODIs came in the match between England and the Netherlands in June 2022. Playing in the first ODI at VRA Cricket Ground in Amstelveen, the touring side posted a total of 498/4.

Rank	Score	Opposition	Venue	Date	Scorecard
1	498/4 ♠	Netherlands	VRA Cricket Ground, Amstelveen, Netherlands	17 June 2022	Scorecard
2	481/6	Australia	Trent Bridge, Nottingham, England	19 June 2018	Scorecard
3	444/3	Pakistan	Trent Bridge, Nottingham, England	30 August 2016	Scorecard
4	429/4	Sri Lanka	Rawalpindi Cricket Stadium, Rawalpindi, Pakistan	22 October 2026	Scorecard
5	418/6	West Indies	National Cricket Stadium, St. George's, Grenada	27 February 2019	Scorecard
Last updated: 22 October 2026

==== Fewest runs in an innings ====
The lowest innings total scored in ODIs has been scored twice. Zimbabwe were dismissed for 35 by Sri Lanka during the third ODI in Sri Lanka's tour of Zimbabwe in April 2004 and USA were dismissed for same score by Nepal in the sixth ODI of the 2020 ICC Cricket World League 2 in Nepal in February 2020. The lowest score in ODI history for England is 86 scored against Australia in the 2001 NatWest Series.

Rank	Score	Opposition	Venue	Date	Scorecard
1	86	Australia	Old Trafford, Manchester, England	14 June 2001	Scorecard
2	88	Sri Lanka	Rangiri Dambulla International Stadium, Dambulla, Sri Lanka	18 November 2003	Scorecard
3	89	New Zealand	Westpac Stadium, Wellington, New Zealand	16 February 2002	Scorecard
4	93	Australia	Headingley, Leeds, England	18 June 1975 ‡	Scorecard
5	94	Australia	Melbourne Cricket Ground, Melbourne, Australia	7 February 1979	Scorecard
Last updated: 1 July 2020

==== Most runs conceded an innings ====
During England's first match against Sri Lanka at the 2026 Pakistan ODI Tri-Series, they conceded their highest innings total of 430/8.

Rank	Score	Opposition	Venue	Date	Scorecard
1	430/8	Sri Lanka	Rawalpindi Cricket Stadium, Rawalpindi, Pakistan	22 October 2026	Scorecard
2	399/7	South Africa	Wankhede Stadium, Mumbai, India	21 October 2023	Scorecard
3	398/5	New Zealand	The Oval, London, England	12 June 2015	Scorecard
4	389	West Indies	National Cricket Stadium, St. George's, Grenada	27 February 2019	Scorecard
5	387/5	India	Madhavrao Scindia Cricket Ground, Rajkot, India	14 November 2008	Scorecard
Last updated: 22 October 2026

==== Fewest runs conceded in an innings ====
The lowest score conceded by England for a full innings is 45 scored by Canada in the 1979 Cricket World Cup.

Rank	Score	Opposition	Venue	Date	Scorecard
1	45	Canada	Old Trafford, Manchester, England	13 June 1979 ‡	Scorecard
2	67	Sri Lanka	Old Trafford, Manchester, England	28 May 2014	Scorecard
3	70	Australia	Edgbaston, Birmingham, England	4 June 1977	Scorecard
4	72	South Africa	Rose Bowl, Southampton, England	7 September 2025	Scorecard
5	74	Pakistan	Adelaide Oval, Adelaide, Australia	1 March 1992 ‡	Scorecard
Last updated: 7 September 2025

==== Most runs aggregate in a match ====
The highest match aggregate scored in ODIs came in the match between South Africa and Australia in the fifth ODI of March 2006 series at Wanderers Stadium, Johannesburg when South Africa scored 438/9 in response to Australia's 434/4, for a total of 872 runs.

Rank	Aggregate	Scores	Venue	Date	Scorecard
1	859/12	England (429/4) v Sri Lanka (430/8)	Rawalpindi Cricket Stadium, Rawalpindi, Pakistan	22 October 2026	Scorecard
2	807/16	England (418/6) v West Indies (389)	National Cricket Stadium, St. George's, Grenada	27 February 2019	Scorecard
3	764/14	England (498/4) v Netherlands (266)	VRA Cricket Ground, Amstelveen, Netherlands	17 June 2022	Scorecard
4	763/14	New Zealand (398/5) v England (365/9)	The Oval, London, England	12 June 2015	Scorecard
5	747/14	India (381/6) v England (366/8)	Barabati Stadium, Cuttack, India	19 January 2017	Scorecard
5	747/10	England (387/3) v India (360/7)	Lord's, London, England	19 July 2026	Scorecard
Last updated: 22 October 2026

==== Fewest runs aggregate in a match ====
The lowest match aggregate in ODIs is 71 when USA were dismissed for 35 by Nepal in the sixth ODI of the 2020 ICC Cricket World League 2 in Nepal in February 2020. The lowest match aggregate in ODI history for England is 91 scored at the 1979 Cricket World Cup against Canada.

Rank	Aggregate	Scores	Venue	Date	Scorecard
1	91/12	Canada (45) v England (46/2)	Old Trafford, Manchester, England	13 June 1979 ‡	Scorecard
2	140/10	Sri Lanka (67) v England (73/0)	Old Trafford, Manchester, England	28 May 2014	Scorecard
3	165/11	England (81/9) v Pakistan (84/2)	Edgbaston, Birmingham, England	3 September 1974	Scorecard
4	168/10	South Africa (83) v England (85/0)	Trent Bridge, Nottingham, England	26 August 2008	Scorecard
5	177/10	England (88/7) v New Zealand (89/3)	WACA, Perth, Australia	5 February 1983	Scorecard
5	177/10	England (88) v Sri Lanka (89/0)	Rangiri Dambulla International Stadium, Dambulla, Sri Lanka	18 November 2003	Scorecard
Last updated: 1 July 2020

=== Result records ===
An ODI match is won when one side has scored more runs than the total runs scored by the opposing side during their innings. If both sides have completed both their allocated innings and the side that fielded last has the higher aggregate of runs, it is known as a win by runs. This indicates the number of runs that they had scored more than the opposing side. If the side batting last wins the match, it is known as a win by wickets, indicating the number of wickets that were still to fall.

==== Greatest win margins (by runs) ====
The greatest winning margin by runs in ODIs was England's victory over South Africa by 342 runs in the third and final ODI of South Africa's 2025 tour of England.

Rank	Margin	Target	Opposition	Venue	Date
1	342 runs ♠	415	South Africa	Rose Bowl, Southampton, England	7 September 2025
2	242 runs	482	Australia	Trent Bridge, Nottingham, England	19 June 2018
3	238 runs	401	West Indies	Edgbaston, Birmingham, England	29 May 2025
4	232 runs	499	Netherlands	VRA Cricket Ground, Amstelveen, Netherlands	17 June 2022
5	223 runs	356	Sri Lanka	The Oval, London, England	27 September 2026
Last updated: 27 September 2026

==== Greatest win margins (by balls remaining) ====
The greatest winning margin by balls remaining in ODIs was England's victory over Canada by 8 wickets with 277 balls remaining in the 1979 Cricket World Cup.

Rank	Balls remaining	Margin	Opposition	Venue	Date
1	277 ♠	8 wickets	Canada	Old Trafford, Manchester, England	13 June 1979 ‡
2	227	10 wickets	Sri Lanka	Old Trafford, Manchester, England	28 May 2014
3	215	9 wickets	Sri Lanka	Headingley, Leeds, England	20 June 1983 ‡
3	215	10 wickets	South Africa	Trent Bridge, Nottingham, England	26 August 2008
5	193	6 wickets	Zimbabwe	Bristol County Ground, Bristol, England	6 July 2003
Last updated: 1 July 2020

==== Greatest win margins (by wickets) ====
A total of 55 matches have ended with chasing team winning by 10 wickets with West Indies winning by such margins a record 10 times. England have won a match by such margin on 6 occasions, including chasing a score of 255 against Sri Lanka in June 2016, which is the third highest score chased without losing a wicket, behind South Africa and Australia.

Rank	Margin (wickets)	Target	Opposition	Ground	Date
1	10	255	Sri Lanka	Edgbaston	24 June 2016
1	10	191	Bangladesh	The Oval	16 June 2005
1	10	171	Sri Lanka	Trent Bridge	6 July 2011
1	10	170	West Indies	Riverside Ground	15 July 2000
1	10	84	South Africa	Trent Bridge	26 August 2008
1	10	68	Sri Lanka	Old Trafford	28 May 2014
Last updated: 1 August 2020.

==== Highest successful run chases ====
South Africa holds the record for the highest successful run chase which they achieved when they scored 438/9 in response to Australia's 434/9. England's highest winning total while chasing is 364/4 in a run chase against West Indies at Kensington Oval, Bridgetown during the 2019 ODI series in West Indies. They have also made the higher scores in defeats.

Rank	Score	Target	Opposition	Venue	Date
1	364/4	361	West Indies	Kensington Oval, Bridgetown, Barbados	20 February 2019
2	359/4	359	Pakistan	Bristol County Ground, Bristol, England	19 May 2019
3	350/3	350	New Zealand	Trent Bridge, Nottingham, England	17 June 2015
4	341/7	341	Pakistan	Trent Bridge, Nottingham, England	17 May 2019
5	337/4	337	India	Maharashtra Cricket Association Stadium, Pune, India	26 March 2021
Last updated: 27 March 2021

==== Narrowest win margins (by runs) ====
The narrowest run margin victory is by 1 run which has been achieved in 31 ODI's with Australia winning such games a record 6 times. England's has achieved a victory by 1 run on two occasions, once via revised target.

Rank	Margin	Opposition	Venue	Date
1	1 run	India	Barabati Stadium, Cuttack, India	27 December 1984
1	1 run	West Indies	Providence Stadium, Providence, West Indies	20 March 2009
3	2 runs	West Indies	Sydney Cricket Ground, Sydney, Australia	28 November 1979
3	2 runs	India	Arun Jaitley Stadium, New Delhi, India	31 January 2002
3	2 runs	South Africa	Rose Bowl, Southampton, England	27 May 2017
Last updated: 1 July 2020

==== Narrowest win margins (by balls remaining) ====
The narrowest winning margin by balls remaining in ODIs is by winning of the last ball which has been achieved 36 times with both South Africa winning seven times. England has achieved a victory by this margin on three occasions.

Rank	Balls remaining	Margin	Opposition	Venue	Date
1	0	3 wickets	Pakistan	Zafar Ali Stadium, Sahiwal, Pakistan	23 December 1977
1	0	5 wickets	West Indies	Queen's Park Oval, Port of Spain, Trinidad & Tobago	4 March 1986
1	0	4 wickets	India	Sawai Mansingh Stadium, Jaipur, India	18 January 1993
4	1	3 wickets	Australia	Sydney Cricket Ground, Sydney, Australia	22 January 1987
4	1	3 wickets	South Africa	Melbourne Cricket Ground, Melbourne, Australia	12 March 1992 ‡
4	1	3 wickets	New Zealand	Bellerive Oval, Hobart, Australia	16 January 2007
4	1	1 wicket	West Indies	Kensington Oval, Bridgetown, Barbados	21 April 2007 ‡
Last updated: 1 July 2020

==== Narrowest win margins (by wickets) ====
The narrowest margin of victory by wickets is 1 wicket which has settled 55 such ODIs. Both West Indies and New Zealand have recorded such victory on eight occasions. England has won the match by a margin of one wicket on seven occasions.

Rank	Margin	Opposition	Venue	Date
1	1 wicket	West Indies	Headingley, Leeds, England	5 September 1973
1	1 wicket	Pakistan	Edgbaston, Birmingham, England	25 May 1987
1	1 wicket	West Indies	Edgbaston, Birmingham, England	23 May 1991
1	1 wicket	Zimbabwe	Queens Sports Club, Bulawayo, Zimbabwe	18 February 2000
1	1 wicket	West Indies	Kensington Oval, Bridgetown, Barbados	21 April 2007 ‡
1	1 wicket	Australia	Old Trafford, Manchester, England	27 June 2010
1	1 wicket	Australia	Old Trafford, Manchester, England	24 June 2018
Last updated: 1 July 2020

==== Greatest loss margins (by runs) ====
England's biggest defeat by runs was against South Africa at the Wankhede Stadium during the 2023 ICC Men's Cricket World Cup.

Rank	Margin	Opposition	Venue	Date
1	229 runs	South Africa	Wankhede Stadium, Mumbai, India	21 October 2023
2	221 runs	Australia	Melbourne Cricket Ground, Melbourne, Australia	22 November 2022
3	219 runs	Sri Lanka	Ranasinghe Premadasa Stadium, Colombo, Sri Lanka	23 October 2018
4	165 runs	West Indies	Arnos Vale Stadium, Kingstown, Saint Vincent & the Grenadines	2 March 1994
4	165 runs	Pakistan	National Stadium, Karachi, Pakistan	15 December 2005
Last updated: 21 October 2023

==== Greatest loss margins (by balls remaining) ====
The greatest winning margin by balls remaining in ODIs was England's victory over Canada by 8 wickets with 277 balls remaining in the 1979 Cricket World Cup. The largest defeat suffered by England was against West Indies in West Indies when they lost by 7 wickets with 227 balls remaining.

Rank	Balls remaining	Margin	Opposition	Venue	Date
1	227	7 wickets	West Indies	Darren Sammy National Cricket Stadium, Gros Islet, Saint Lucia	2 March 2019
2	226	10 wickets	Australia	Sydney Cricket Ground, Sydney, Australia	23 January 2003
2	226	8 wickets	New Zealand	Westpac Stadium, Wellington, New Zealand	20 February 2015 ‡
4	217	10 wickets	Sri Lanka	Rangiri Dambulla International Stadium, Dambulla, Sri Lanka	18 November 2003
5	196	7 wickets	New Zealand	County Ground, Chester-le-Street, England	29 June 2004
Last updated: 1 July 2020

==== Greatest loss margins (by wickets) ====
England have lost an ODI match by a margin of 10 wickets on five occasions with most recent being during the Quarter-final of the 2011 Cricket World Cup against Sri Lanka in March 2001 at Colombo (SSC).

Rank	Margins	Opposition	Most recent venue	Date
1	10 wickets	Sri Lanka	Sinhalese Sports Club Ground, Colombo, Sri Lanka	27 March 2001
1	10 wickets	Australia	Sydney Cricket Ground, Sydney, Australia	23 January 2003
1	10 wickets	Sri Lanka	Rangiri Dambulla International Stadium, Dambulla, Sri Lanka	18 November 2003
1	10 wickets	New Zealand	Seddon Park, Hamilton, New Zealand	12 February 2008
1	10 wickets	Sri Lanka	Sinhalese Sports Club Ground, Colombo, Sri Lanka	26 March 2011 ‡
1	10 wickets	India	The Oval, London, England	12 July 2022
Last updated: 12 July 2022

==== Narrowest loss margins (by runs) ====
The narrowest loss of England in terms of runs is by 1 run suffered against South Africa at Cape Town during the 2000 ODI Series.

Rank	Margin	Opposition	Venue	Date
1	1 run	South Africa	Sahara Park Newlands, Cape Town, South Africa	26 January 2000
2	2 runs	West Indies	Melbourne Cricket Ground, Melbourne, Australia	20 January 1980
2	2 runs	West Indies	Arnos Vale Stadium, Kingstown, Saint Vincent & the Grenadines	4 February 1981
2	2 runs	Australia	Edgbaston, Birmingham, England	6 June 1981
2	2 runs	New Zealand	Melbourne Cricket Ground, Melbourne, Australia	13 January 1983
2	2 runs	Pakistan	Lord's, London, England	12 June 2001
2	2 runs	Sri Lanka	Sir Vivian Richards Stadium, Antigua, Antigua & Barbuda	4 April 2007 ‡
Last updated: 1 July 2020

==== Narrowest loss margins (by balls remaining) ====
The narrowest losing margin by balls remaining in ODIs is by losing on the final delivery. This has happened 41 times, with the West Indies doing so a record seven times. England has suffered loss by this margin three times.

Rank	Balls remaining	Margin	Opposition	Venue	Date
1	0	2 wickets	Australia	Sharjah Cricket Stadium, Sharjah, United Arab Emirates	24 March 1985
1	0	3 wickets	West Indies	Sabina Park, Kingston, Jamaica	3 March 1990
1	0	1 wicket	New Zealand	The Oval, London, England	25 June 2008
4	1	2 wickets	New Zealand	Edgbaston, Birmingham, England	15 June 1983 ‡
4	1	4 wickets	New Zealand	Headingley, Leeds, England	23 May 1990
4	1	1 wicket	West Indies	Kensington Oval, Bridgetown, Barbados	1 April 1998
4	1	3 wickets	Australia	Bellerive Oval, Hobart, Australia	23 January 2015
4	1	7 wickets	Ireland	Rose Bowl, Southampton, England	4 August 2020
4	1	2 wickets	Sri Lanka	Rawalpindi Cricket Stadium, Rawalpindi, Pakistan	22 October 2026
Last updated: 22 October 2026

==== Narrowest loss margins (by wickets) ====
England has suffered defeat by a single wicket on six occasions.

Rank	Margin	Opposition	Venue	Date
1	1 wicket	West Indies	Kensington Oval, Bridgetown, Barbados	1 April 1998
1	1 wicket	Sri Lanka	Adelaide Oval, Adelaide, Australia	23 January 1999
1	1 wicket	New Zealand	The Oval, London, England	25 June 2008
1	1 wicket	Australia	Brisbane Cricket Ground, Brisbane, Australia	17 January 2014
1	1 wicket	South Africa	New Wanderers Stadium, Johannesburg, South Africa	12 February 2016
1	1 wicket	Pakistan	Gaddafi Stadium, Lahore, Pakistan	25 October 2026
Last updated: 25 October 2026

==== Tied matches ====
A tie can occur when the scores of both teams are equal at the conclusion of play, provided that the side batting last has completed their innings. There have been 37 ties in ODIs history with England involved in 9 such games.

Ties are no longer possible in ODIs as if scores are level at the end of the second batting team's innings, the game is decided by a 'super-over' (played ad infinitum).

This happened at the end of England's 2019 tie with New Zealand (which happened to be the World Cup final). England won after a tied super-over by virtue of a better boundary count in the 50-over game (this method is no longer used to decide games where a super-over is played after a tie at 50 overs).

Opposition	Venue	Date
Australia	Trent Bridge, Nottingham, England	27 May 1989
New Zealand	McLean Park, Napier, New Zealand	26 February 1997
South Africa	Goodyear Park, Bloemfontein, South Africa	2 February 2005
Australia	Lord's, London, England	2 July 2005
New Zealand	McLean Park, Napier, New Zealand	20 February 2008
India	M. Chinnaswamy Stadium, Bangalore, India	27 February 2011 ‡
India	Lord's, London, England	11 September 2011
Sri Lanka	Trent Bridge, Nottingham, England	21 June 2016
New Zealand	Lord's, London, England	14 July 2019 ‡
Last updated: 14 July 2019

== Individual records ==
=== Batting records ===
==== Most career runs ====
A run is the basic means of scoring in cricket. A run is scored when the batsman hits the ball with his bat and with his partner runs the length of 22 yards (20 m) of the pitch. India's Sachin Tendulkar, with 18,246, has scored the most runs in ODIs.

Rank	Runs	Player	Innings	Period
1	8,101	Joe Root†	190	2013–2026
2	6,957	Eoin Morgan	207	2009–2022
3	5,678	Jos Buttler†	176	2012–2026
4	5,416	Ian Bell	157	2004–2015
5	5,092	Paul Collingwood	181	2001–2011
6	4,677	Alec Stewart	162	1989–2003
7	4,422	Kevin Pietersen	123	2004–2013
8	4,335	Marcus Trescothick	122	2000–2006
9	4,290	Graham Gooch	122	1976–1995
10	4,271	Jason Roy	110	2015–2023
Last updated: 18 November 2026

==== Fastest to multiples of 1000 runs ====
Runs	Batsman	Innings	Record Date	Reference
1000	Ben Duckett	21	26 February 2025	
1000	Dawid Malan	21	2 March 2011‡	
1000	Kevin Pietersen	21	31 March 2006	
1000	Jonathan Trott	21	15 September 2023‡	
2000	Kevin Pietersen	45	21 April 2007‡	
3000	Joe Root	72	1 September 2016	
3000	Jonny Bairstow	72	1 August 2020	
4000	Joe Root	91	29 September 2017	
5000	Joe Root	116	20 February 2019	
6000	Joe Root	141	29 June 2021	
7000	Joe Root	168	1 June 2025	
8000	Joe Root	186	22 October 2026	
Last updated: 22 October 2026

==== Highest individual score ====
The fourth ODI of the Sri Lanka's tour of India in 2014 saw Rohit Sharma score the highest individual score in an ODI. The England record for highest individual score in an ODI is held by Harry Brook, who scored 202 against Sri Lanka in England's first match against them at the 2026 Pakistan ODI Tri-Series.

Rank	Runs	Player	Opposition	Venue	Date
1	202	Harry Brook	Sri Lanka	Rawalpindi Cricket Stadium, Rawalpindi, Pakistan	22 October 2026
2	182	Ben Stokes	New Zealand	The Oval, London, England	13 September 2023
3	180	Jason Roy	Australia	Melbourne Cricket Ground, Melbourne, Australia	14 January 2018
4	171	Alex Hales	Pakistan	Trent Bridge, Nottingham, England	30 August 2016
5	167	Ben Duckett	Sri Lanka	Gaddafi Stadium, Lahore, Pakistan	29 October 2026
5	167*	Robin Smith	Australia	Edgbaston, Birmingham, England	21 May 1993
Last updated: 29 October 2026

==== Highest individual score – progression of record ====
Runs	Player	Opponent	Venue	Season
82	John Edrich	Australia	Melbourne Cricket Ground, Melbourne, Australia	1970-71
103	Dennis Amiss	Australia	Old Trafford, Manchester, England	1972
116*	David Lloyd	Pakistan	Trent Bridge, Nottingham, England	1974
137	Dennis Amiss	India	Lord's, London, England	1975 ‡
158	David Gower	New Zealand	Brisbane Cricket Ground, Brisbane, Australia	1982-83
167*	Robin Smith	Australia	Edgbaston, Birmingham, England	1993
171	Alex Hales	Pakistan	Trent Bridge, Nottingham, England	2016
180	Jason Roy	Australia	Melbourne Cricket Ground, Melbourne, Australia	2018
182	Ben Stokes	New Zealand	The Oval, London, England	2023
202	Harry Brook	Sri Lanka	Rawalpindi Cricket Stadium, Rawalpindi	2026–27
Last updated: 22 October 2026

==== Highest career average ====
A batsman's batting average is the total number of runs they have scored divided by the number of times they have been dismissed.

Rank	Average	Player	Innings	Runs	Not out	Period
1	55.8	Dawid Malan	30	1,450	4	2019–2023
2	51.3	Jonathan Trott	65	2,819	10	2009–2013
3	50.0	Joe Root†	190	8,101	28	2013–2026
4	46.2	Ben Duckett†	47	2,125	1	2016–2026
5	43.0	Jonny Bairstow	98	3,868	8	2011–2023
Qualification: 25 innings. Last updated: 18 November 2026

==== Most half-centuries ====
A half-century is a score of between 50 and 99 runs. Statistically, once a batsman's score reaches 100, it is no longer considered a half-century but a century. Sachin Tendulkar of India has scored the most half-centuries in ODIs with 96.

Rank	Half centuries	Player	Innings	Period
1	50	Joe Root†	190	2013–2026
2	42	Eoin Morgan	207	2009–2022
3	35	Ian Bell	157	2004–2015
4	30	Jos Buttler†	176	2012–2026
5	28	Alec Stewart	162	1989–2003
Last updated: 18 November 2026

==== Most centuries ====
A century is a score of 100 or more runs in a single innings. Virat Kohli has also scored the most centuries in ODIs with 54.

Rank	Centuries	Player	Innings	Period
1	20	Joe Root†	190	2013–2026
2	13	Eoin Morgan	207	2009–2022
3	12	Jason Roy	110	2015–2023
3	12	Marcus Trescothick	122	2000–2006
5	11	Jonny Bairstow	98	2011–2023
5	11	Jos Buttler†	176	2012–2026
Last updated: 18 November 2026

==== Most sixes ====
Rank	Sixes	Player	Innings	Period
1	202	Eoin Morgan	207	2009–2022
2	193	Jos Buttler†	176	2012–2026
3	109	Ben Stokes	99	2011–2023
4	92	Jonny Bairstow	98	2011–2023
4	92	Andrew Flintoff	119	1999–2009
Last updated: 24 September 2026

==== Most fours ====
Rank	Fours	Player	Innings	Period
1	663	Joe Root†	190	2013–2026
2	588	Eoin Morgan	207	2009–2022
3	528	Marcus Trescothick	122	2000–2006
4	525	Ian Bell	157	2004–2015
5	511	Jason Roy	110	2015–2023
Last updated: 18 November 2026

==== Highest strike rates ====
The world record for highest ODI career strike rate (with a minimum of 500 deliveries faced) is held by Andre Russell of the West Indies, with 130.2.

Rank	Strike rate	Player	Runs	Balls Faced	Period
1	115.5	Jos Buttler†	5,678	4,914	2012–2026
2	114.8	Phil Salt†	988	861	2021–2025
3	108.7	Harry Brook†	1,805	1,660	2023–2026
4	108.1	Liam Livingstone†	932	862	2021–2025
5	106.5	Tom Banton	756	710	2020–2026
Qualification: 500 balls faced. Last updated: 18 November 2026

==== Highest strike rates in an innings ====
The record for highest batting strike rate in a single ODI innings (minimum 25 runs scored) is held by New Zealand's James Franklin, who struck at 387.5 during his 31* off 8 balls against Canada during 2011 Cricket World Cup

Rank	Strike rate	Player	Runs	Balls Faced	Opposition	Venue	Date
1	344.4	Moeen Ali	31*	9	Afghanistan	Old Trafford, Manchester, England	18 June 2019 ‡
2	315.4	Jos Buttler	41*	13	India	Lord's, London, England	19 July 2026
3	300.0	Liam Livingstone	66*	22	Netherlands	VRA Cricket Ground, Amstelveen, Netherlands	17 June 2022
3	300.0	Liam Plunkett	27*	9	Bangladesh	SWALEC Stadium, Cardiff, England	8 June 2019 ‡
5	293.8	Jos Buttler	47*	16	New Zealand	Trent Bridge, Nottingham, England	3 June 2013
Qualification: 25 runs. Last updated: 19 July 2026

==== Most runs in a calendar year ====
Tendulkar holds the record for most runs scored in a calendar year with 1894 runs scored in 1998. Jonathan Trott scored 1315 runs in 2011, the most for an English batsmen in a year.

Rank	Runs	Player	Matches	Innings	Year
1	1,315	Jonathan Trott	29	28	2011
2	1,086	David Gower	20	20	1983
3	1,080	Ian Bell	33	33	2007
4	1,064	Paul Collingwood	33	32	2007
5	1,047	Chris Broad	26	26	1987
Last updated: 1 July 2020

==== Most runs in a series ====
The 1980-81 Benson & Hedges World Series Cup in Australia saw Greg Chappell set the record for the most runs scored in a single series scoring 685 runs. He is followed by Sachin Tendulkar with 673 runs scored in the 2003 Cricket World Cup. David Gower has scored the most runs in a series for an English batsmen, when he scored 563 runs in the Benson & Hedges World Series in 1982-83.

Rank	Runs	Player	Matches	Innings	Series
1	563	David Gower	10	10	1982–83 Australian Tri-Series
2	556	Joe Root	11	11	2019 Cricket World Cup
3	532	Jonny Bairstow	11	11	2019 Cricket World Cup
4	513	Graeme Hick	12	12	1998–99 Carlton and United Series
5	471	Graham Gooch	8	8	1987 Cricket World Cup
Last updated: 1 July 2020

==== Most ducks ====
A duck refers to a batsman being dismissed without scoring a run. Sanath Jayasuriya has scored the highest number of ducks in ODIs with 34.

Rank	Ducks	Player	Innings	Period
1	15	Jos Buttler†	176	2012–2026
1	15	Eoin Morgan	207	2009–2022
3	13	Alec Stewart	162	1989–2003
3	13	Marcus Trescothick	122	2000–2006
5	11	Jason Roy	110	2015–2023
Last updated: 24 September 2026

=== Bowling records ===
==== Most career wickets ====
A bowler takes the wicket of a batsman when the form of dismissal is bowled, caught, leg before wicket, stumped or hit wicket. If the batsman is dismissed by run out, obstructing the field, handling the ball, hitting the ball twice or timed out the bowler does not receive credit.

Rank	Wickets	Player	Matches	Period
1	269	James Anderson	194	2002–2015
2	244	Adil Rashid†	165	2009–2026
3	234	Darren Gough	158	1994–2006
4	178	Stuart Broad	121	2006–2016
5	173	Chris Woakes	122	2011–2023
6	168	Andrew Flintoff	138	1999–2009
7	145	Ian Botham	116	1976–1992
8	135	Liam Plunkett	89	2005–2019
9	115	Phil DeFreitas	103	1987–1997
10	111	Moeen Ali	138	2014–2023
10	111	Paul Collingwood	197	2001–2011
Last updated: 20 October 2026

==== Fastest to multiples of wickets ====
Wickets	Bowler	Match	Record Date	Reference
50	Jofra Archer	30	26 February 2025	
100	Darren Gough	62	18 May 1999‡	
100	Stuart Broad	62	24 June 2010	
150	Stuart Broad	95	20 February 2013	
200	Darren Gough	134	5 September 2004	
250	James Anderson	177	25 May 2014	
Last updated: 26 February 2025

==== Best figures in an innings ====
Figures	Player	Opposition	Venue	Date
6/24	Reece Topley	India	Lord's, London, England	14 July 2022
6/31	Paul Collingwood	Bangladesh	Trent Bridge, Nottingham, England	21 June 2005
6/40	Jofra Archer	South Africa	De Beers Diamond Oval, Kimberley, South Africa	1 February 2023
6/45	Chris Woakes	Australia	The Gabba, Brisbane, Australia	30 January 2011
6/47	Chris Woakes	Sri Lanka	Pallekele International Cricket Stadium, Pallekele, Sri Lanka	10 December 2014
Last updated: 1 February 2023

==== Best figures in an innings – progression of record ====
Figures	Player	Opposition	Venue	Season
3/50	Ray Illingworth	Australia	Melbourne Cricket Ground, Melbourne, Australia	1970–71
3/33	Bob Woolmer	Australia	Old Trafford, Manchester, England	1972
4/27	Geoff Arnold	Australia	Edgbaston, Birmingham, England	1972
4/11	John Snow	East Africa	Edgbaston, Birmingham, England	1975 ‡
4/8	Chris Old	Canada	Old Trafford, Manchester, England	1979 ‡
5/31	Mike Hendrick	Australia	The Oval, London, England	1980
5/20	Vic Marks	New Zealand	Basin Reserve, Wellington, New Zealand	1983–84
5/15	Mark Ealham	Zimbabwe	De Beers Diamond Oval, Kimberley, South Africa	1999–2000
6/31	Paul Collingwood	Bangladesh	Trent Bridge, Nottingham, England	2005
6/24	Reece Topley	India	Lord's, London, England	2022
Last updated: 15 July 2022

==== Best career average ====
A bowler's bowling average is the total number of runs they have conceded divided by the number of wickets they have taken. Scotland's Brad Currie is the bowler with the best ODI bowling average (minimum 25 wickets taken), with 14.1.

Rank	Average	Player	Wickets	Runs	Balls	Period
1	19.5	Mike Hendrick	35	681	1,248	1973–1981
2	22.2	Chris Old	45	999	1,755	1973–1981
3	22.9	Derek Underwood	32	734	1,278	1973–1982
4	23.6	Andrew Flintoff	168	3,968	5,496	1999–2009
5	24.6	Bob Willis	80	1,968	3,595	2019–2026
Qualification: 25 wickets. Last updated: 19 July 2026

==== Best career economy rate ====
A bowler's economy rate is the total number of runs they have conceded divided by the number of overs they have bowled. The West Indies' Joel Garner holds the ODI record for the best career economy rate with 3.09 (minimum 1000 deliveries).

Rank	Economy rate	Player	Runs	Balls	Period
1	3.27	Mike Hendrick	681	1,248	1973–1981
2	3.28	Bob Willis	1,968	3,595	1973–1984
3	3.41	Chris Old	999	1,755	1973–1981
4	3.44	Derek Underwood	734	1,278	1973–1982
5	3.54	Angus Fraser	1,412	2,392	1989–1999
Qualification: 1,000 balls. Last updated: 14 July 2026

==== Best career strike rate ====
A bowler's strike rate is the total number of balls they have bowled divided by the number of wickets they have taken. The bowler with the best ODI strike rate (minimum 25 wickets taken) is Scotland's Brad Currie, with 20.0.

Rank	Strike rate	Player	Wickets	Balls	Period
1	29.6	Reece Topley	47	1392	2015–2024
2	30.6	Liam Plunkett	135	4137	2005–2019
3	31.9	Jofra Archer†	73	2330	2019–2026
4	32.3	David Willey	100	3230	2015–2023
5	32.7	Andrew Flintoff	168	5496	1999–2009
Qualification: 25 wickets. Last updated: 18 November 2026

==== Most hauls of four or more wickets in a match ====
The ODI record for most match hauls of four or more wickets is held by Pakistan's Waqar Younis, with 27.

Rank	Four-wicket hauls	Player	Matches	Period
1	14	Chris Woakes	122	2011–2023
2	13	James Anderson	194	2002–2015
3	12	Darren Gough	158	1994–2006
3	12	Adil Rashid†	165	2009–2026
5	10	Stuart Broad	121	2006–2016
Last updated: 20 October 2026

==== Most five-wicket hauls in a match ====
The ODI record for most match hauls of five or more wickets is held by Pakistan's Waqar Younis, with 13.

Rank	Five-wicket hauls	Player	Matches	Period
1	3	Chris Woakes	122	2011–2023
2	2	James Anderson	194	2002–2015
2	2	Mark Ealham	64	1996–2001
2	2	Steven Finn	69	2011–2017
2	2	Andrew Flintoff	138	1999–2009
2	2	Darren Gough	158	1994–2006
2	2	Vic Marks	34	1980–1988
2	2	Adil Rashid†	165	2009–2026
Last updated: 20 October 2026

==== Best economy rates in an inning ====
The best economy rate in an inning, when a minimum of 30 balls are delivered by the player, is West Indies player Phil Simmons economy of 0.30 during his spell of 3 runs for 4 wickets in 10 overs against Pakistan at Sydney Cricket Ground in the 1991–92 Australian Tri-Series. Dermot Reeve holds the English record during his spell in 1992 Cricket World Cup game against Pakistan at Adelaide.

Rank	Economy	Player	Overs	Runs	Wickets	Opposition	Venue	Date
1	0.40	Dermot Reeve	5	2	1	Pakistan	Adelaide Oval, Adelaide, Australia	1 March 1992 ‡
2	0.62	Mike Hendrick	8	5	1	Canada	Old Trafford, Manchester, England	13 June 1979 ‡
3	0.80	Barry Wood	5	4	0	India	Lord's, London, England	7 June 1975 ‡
3	0.80	Chris Old	10	8	4	Canada	Old Trafford, Manchester, England	13 June 1979 ‡
5	0.85	Chris Old	7	6	2	Pakistan	Old Trafford, Manchester, England	24 May 1978
Qualification: 30 balls bowled. Last updated: 1 July 2020

==== Best strike rates in an inning ====
The best strike rate in an inning, when a minimum of 3 wickets are taken by the player, was achieved by Ajay Jadeja of India, who once achieved a strike rate of 2.0 balls per wicket.

Rank	Strike rate	Player	Wickets	Balls	Opposition	Venue	Date
1	4.2	Paul Collingwood	4	17	New Zealand	County Ground, Chester-le-Street, England	15 June 2008
2	5.6	Andrew Flintoff	3	17	Zimbabwe	Bristol County Ground, Bristol, England	6 July 2003
3	6.0	Andrew Flintoff	5	30	West Indies	Darren Sammy National Cricket Stadium, Gros Islet, Saint Lucia	3 April 2009
3	6.0	Owais Shah	3	18	Ireland	Stormont, Belfast, Northern Ireland	27 August 2009
3	6.0	James Tredwell	4	24	Scotland	Mannofield Park, Aberdeen, Scotland	9 May 2014
Last updated: 20 September 2024

==== Worst figures in an innings ====
The worst figures in an ODI came in the 5th One Day International between South Africa at home to Australia in 2006. Australia's Mick Lewis returned figures of 0/113 from his 10 overs in the second innings of the match. The worst figures by an English is 0/98 that came off the bowling of Sam Curran in the 2023 ODI Series against West Indies in Antigua.

Rank	Figures	Player	Overs	Opposition	Venue	Date
1	0/98	Sam Curran	9.5	West Indies	Sir Vivian Richards Stadium, Antigua, Antigua and Barbuda	3 December 2023
2	0/97	Steve Harmison	10	Sri Lanka	Headingley, Leeds, England	1 July 2006
3	0/91	Chris Woakes	10	West Indies	National Cricket Stadium, St. George's, Grenada	27 February 2019
4	0/89	Chris Woakes	10	Australia	WACA, Perth, Australia	1 February 2015
5	0/87	Jade Dernbach	10	New Zealand	Rose Bowl, Southampton, England	2 June 2013
Last updated: 20 September 2024

==== Most runs conceded in a match ====
The world record for most runs conceded in an ODI by a single bowler is held by the Netherlands' Bas de Leede, who conceded 115 runs against Australia at the 2023 Cricket World Cup. The England record is held by Sam Curran, who conceded 103 runs against Sri Lanka during England's first match against them at the 2026 Pakistan ODI Tri-Series.

Rank	Figures	Player	Overs	Opposition	Venue	Date
1	2/103	Sam Curran	9.0	Sri Lanka	Rawalpindi Cricket Stadium, Rawalpindi, Pakistan	26 October 2026
2	0/98	Sam Curran	9.5	West Indies	Sir Vivian Richards Stadium, Antigua, Antigua & Barbuda	3 December 2023
3	0/97	Steve Harmison	10	Sri Lanka	Headingley, Leeds, England	1 July 2006
3	1/97	Chris Jordan	9	New Zealand	The Oval, London, England	12 June 2015
5	1/94	Jake Ball	10	West Indies	Rose Bowl, Southampton, England	29 September 2017
Last updated: 22 October 2026

==== Most wickets in a calendar year ====
Pakistan's Saqlain Mushtaq holds the record for most wickets taken in a year when he took 69 wickets in 1997 in 36 ODIs. England's John Emburey is the highest English bowler on the list having taken 43 wickets in 1987.

Rank	Wickets	Player	Matches	Year
1	43	John Emburey	31	1987
2	42	Adil Rashid	24	2018
3	41	James Anderson	24	2003
4	39	Phillip DeFreitas	30	1987
4	39	James Anderson	28	2007
Last updated: 1 July 2020

==== Most wickets in a series ====
1998–99 Carlton and United Series involving Australia, England and Sri Lanka and the 2019 Cricket World Cup saw the records set for the most wickets taken by a bowler in an ODI series when Australian pacemen Glenn McGrath and Mitchell Starc achieved a total of 27 wickets during the series, respectively. England's Jofra Archer is joint 26th with his 20 wickets taken during the 2019 Cricket World Cup.

Rank	Wickets	Player	Matches	Series
1	20	Jofra Archer	11	2019 Cricket World Cup
2	18	Darren Gough	12	1998–99 Carlton and United Series
2	18	Mark Wood	10	2019 Cricket World Cup
4	17	Ian Botham	10	1982–83 Australian Tri-Series
4	17	Phillip DeFreitas	10	1986–87 Australian Tri-Series
Last updated: 1 July 2020

==== Hat-trick ====
In cricket, a hat-trick occurs when a bowler takes three wickets with consecutive deliveries. The deliveries may be interrupted by an over bowled by another bowler from the other end of the pitch, but must be three consecutive deliveries by the individual bowler in the same match. Only wickets attributed to the bowler count towards a hat-trick; run outs do not count. In ODI history there have been just 49 hat-tricks, the first achieved by Jalal-ud-Din for Pakistan against Australia in 1982.

No.	Bowler	Against	Dismissals	Venue	Date	Ref.
1	James Anderson	Pakistan	• Abdul Razzaq (c Marcus Trescothick) • Shoaib Akhtar (c †Chris Read) • Mohammad Sami (b)	The Oval, London	20 June 2003	
2	Andrew Flintoff	West Indies	• Denesh Ramdin (b) • Ravi Rampaul (lbw) • Sulieman Benn (b)	Beausejour Stadium, Gros Islet, Saint Lucia	3 April 2009	
3	Steven Finn	Australia	• Brad Haddin (c Stuart Broad) • Glenn Maxwell (c Joe Root) • Mitchell Johnson (c James Anderson)	Melbourne Cricket Ground, Melbourne	14 February 2015 ‡	

=== Wicket-keeping records ===
The wicket-keeper is a specialist fielder who stands behind the stumps being guarded by the batsman on strike and is the only member of the fielding side allowed to wear gloves and leg pads.

==== Most career dismissals ====
A wicket-keeper can be credited with the dismissal of a batsman in two ways, caught or stumped. The record for most ODI dismissals by a wicket-keeper is held by Sri Lanka's Kumar Sangakkara, with 482.

Rank	Dismissals	Player	Innings	Period
1	277	Jos Buttler†	193	2012-2026
2	163	Alec Stewart	137	1989-2003
3	77	Matt Prior	56	2004-2011
4	72	Geraint Jones	49	2004-2006
5	64	Craig Kieswetter	42	2010-2013
Last updated: 24 September 2026

==== Most career catches ====
The record for most ODI dismissals by a wicket-keeper is held by Australia's Adam Gilchrist, with 417.

Rank	Catches	Player	Innings	Period
1	238	Jos Buttler†	193	2012-2026
2	148	Alec Stewart	137	1989-2003
3	69	Matt Prior	56	2004-2011
4	68	Geraint Jones	49	2004-2006
5	52	Craig Kieswetter	42	2010-2013
Last updated: 24 September 2026

==== Most career stumpings ====
The record for most ODI dismissals by a wicket-keeper is held by India's MS Dhoni, with 123.

Rank	Stumpings	Player	Innings	Period
1	39	Jos Buttler†	193	2012-2026
2	15	Alec Stewart	137	1989-2003
3	12	Craig Kieswetter	42	2010-2013
4	8	Matt Prior	56	2004-2011
5	7	James Foster	11	2001-2002
Last updated: 24 September 2026

==== Most dismissals in an innings ====
The record for most dismissals by a wicket-keeper in a single ODI innings is six, achieved 19 times by 13 different wicket-keepers, including England's Jos Buttler, Matt Prior and Alec Stewart.

Rank	Dismissals	Player	Opposition	Venue	Date
1	6	Jos Buttler	South Africa	The Oval, London, England	19 June 2013
1	6	Matt Prior	South Africa	Trent Bridge, Nottingham, England	26 August 2008
1	6	Alec Stewart	Zimbabwe	Old Trafford, Manchester, England	13 July 2000
4	5	Jos Buttler	Australia	Rose Bowl, Southampton, England	16 September 2013
4	5	Jos Buttler	Australia	WACA, Perth, Australia	24 January 2014
4	5	Jos Buttler	India	Brisbane Cricket Ground, Brisbane, Australia	20 January 2015
4	5	Geraint Jones	Australia	Edgbaston, Birmingham, England	28 June 2005
4	5	Geraint Jones	Australia	Lord's, London, England	2 July 2005
4	5	Craig Kieswetter	South Africa	Lord's, London, England	2 September 2012
4	5	Chris Read	South Africa	Lord's, London, England	12 July 2003
4	5	John Simpson	Pakistan	Lord's, London, England	10 July 2021
Last updated: 14 July 2026

==== Most dismissals in a series ====
Gilchrist also holds the ODIs record for the most dismissals taken by a wicket-keeper in a series. He made 27 dismissals during the 1998-99 Carlton & United Series. English record is held by Geraint Jones when he made 20 dismissals during the 2005 Natwest Series.

Rank	Dismissals	Player	Matches	Innings	Series
1	20	Geraint Jones	7	7	2005 Natwest Series
2	15	Matt Prior	7	7	Indian cricket team in England in 2007
3	14	Paul Nixon	10	10	2006–07 Commonwealth Bank Series
3	14	Matt Prior	5	5	South African cricket team in England in 2008
3	14	Jos Buttler	11	11	2019 Cricket World Cup
Last updated: 1 July 2020

=== Fielding records ===
==== Most career catches ====
Caught is one of the nine methods a batsman can be dismissed in cricket. (Note: In 2017, The Laws of Cricket were amended, reducing the methods of dismissals from ten to nine, with handled the ball now covered as part of obstructing the field.) Sri Lanka's Mahela Jayawardene holds the record for the most catches in ODIs by a non-wicket-keeper, with 218.

Rank	Catches	Player	Innings	Period
1	108	Paul Collingwood	197	2001–2011
2	98	Joe Root†	198	2013–2026
3	75	Eoin Morgan	218	2009–2022
4	64	Graeme Hick	119	1991–2001
5	57	Andrew Strauss	127	2003–2011
Last updated: 18 November 2026

==== Most catches in an innings ====
England's Harry Brook and South Africa's Jonty Rhodes are the only fielders to have taken five catches in an innings.

Rank	Dismissals	Player	Opposition	Venue	Date
1	5	Harry Brook	West Indies	Edgbaston, Birmingham, England	29 May 2025
2	4	Joe Root	Afghanistan	Arun Jaitley Stadium, New Delhi, India	15 October 2023‡
2	4	Chris Woakes	Pakistan	Trent Bridge, Nottingham, England	3 June 2019‡
4	3	29 players	On a total of 42 occasions		
Last updated: 27 January 2025

==== Most catches in a series ====
The 2019 Cricket World Cup, which was won by England for the first time, saw the record set for the most catches taken by a non-wicket-keeper in an ODI series. Batsman, and then captain of the England Test team, Joe Root took 13 catches in the series (as well as scoring 556 runs).

Rank	Catches	Player	Matches	Innings	Series
1	13	Joe Root	11	11	2019 Cricket World Cup
2	8	Harry Brook	3	3	West Indian cricket team in England in 2025
2	8	Paul Collingwood	9	9	2007 Cricket World Cup
2	8	Paul Collingwood	7	7	Indian cricket team in England in 2007
2	8	Nasser Hussain	10	10	1998–99 Carlton and United Series
2	8	Chris Woakes	11	11	2019 Cricket World Cup
Last updated: 3 June 2025

=== All-round records ===
==== 1000 runs and 100 wickets ====
70 cricketers have achieved the double of 1000 runs and 100 wickets in their ODI career.

Player	Period	Matches	Runs	Bat Avg	Wickets	Bowl Avg
Ian Botham	1976–1992	116	2,113	23.21	145	28.54
Paul Collingwood	2001–2011	197	5,092	35.36	111	38.68
Andrew Flintoff	1999–2009	138	3,293	31.97	168	23.61
Chris Woakes	2011–2023	122	1,524	23.81	173	30.01
Moeen Ali	2014–2023	138	2,355	24.27	111	47.84
Last updated: 26 October 2025

=== Other records ===
==== Most career matches ====
India's Sachin Tendulkar holds the record for the most ODI matches played, with 463.

Rank	Matches	Player	Period
1	225	Eoin Morgan	2009–2022
2	204	Jos Buttler†	2012–2026
3	202	Joe Root†	2013–2026
4	197	Paul Collingwood	2001–2011
5	194	James Anderson	2002–2015
Last updated: 18 November 2026

==== Most consecutive career matches ====
Tendulkar also holds the record for the most consecutive ODI matches played with 185.

Rank	Matches	Player	Period
1	92	Marcus Trescothick	2000–2004
2	74	Andrew Strauss	2003–2007
3	67	Ian Botham	1977–1984
4	66	Joe Root	2017–2020
Last updated: 13 May 2021

==== Most matches as captain ====
Ricky Ponting, who led the Australian cricket team from 2002 to 2012, holds the record for the most matches played as captain in ODIs with 230 (including 1 as captain of ICC World XI team). 2019 Cricket World Cup winning skipper Eoin Morgan has led England in 126 matches.

Rank	Player	Matches	Won	Lost	Tied	NR	Win %	Period
1	Eoin Morgan	126	76	40	2	8	65.25	2011–2022
2	Alastair Cook	69	36	30	1	2	54.47	2010–2014
3	Andrew Strauss	62	27	33	1	1	45.08	2006–2011
4	Michael Vaughan	60	32	22	2	4	58.92	2003–2007
5	Nasser Hussain	56	28	27	0	1	50.90	1997–2003
Last updated: 22 June 2022

==== Youngest players on debut ====
The youngest player to play in an ODI match is claimed to be Hasan Raza at the age of 14 years and 233 days. Making his debut for Pakistan against Zimbabwe on 30 October 1996, there is some doubt as to the validity of Raza's age at the time. The youngest England player to play in an ODI was Rehan Ahmed who at the age of 18 years and 205 days debuted in the third ODI of the series against Bangladesh in March 2023.

Rank	Age	Player	Opposition	Venue	Date
1	18 years and 205 days	Rehan Ahmed	Bangladesh	Zohur Ahmed Chowdhury Stadium, Chattogram, Bangladesh	6 March 2023
2	19 years and 195 days	Ben Hollioake	Australia	Lord's, London, England	25 May 1997
3	20 years and 21 days	Sam Curran	Australia	Old Trafford, Manchester, England	24 June 2018
4	20 years and 67 days	Stuart Broad	Pakistan	Sophia Gardens, Cardiff, England	30 August 2006
5	20 years and 82 days	Ben Stokes	Ireland	Castle Avenue, Dublin, Ireland	25 August 2011
Last updated: 6 March 2023

==== Oldest players on debut ====
The Netherlands batsmen Nolan Clarke is the oldest player to appear in an ODI match. Playing in the 1996 Cricket World Cup against New Zealand in 1996 at Reliance Stadium in Vadodara, England he was aged 47 years and 240 days. Norman Gifford is the oldest English ODI debutant when he played for England during the 1984–85 Four-Nations Cup at the Sharjah Cricket Stadium, Sharjah, United Arab Emirates.

Rank	Age	Player	Opposition	Venue	Date
1	44 years and 359 days	Norman Gifford	Australia	Sharjah Cricket Stadium, Sharjah, United Arab Emirates	24 March 1985
2	42 years and 104 days	Fred Titmus	New Zealand	Carisbrook, Dunedin, New Zealand	8 March 1975
3	41 years and 182 days	Brian Close	Australia	Old Trafford, Manchester, England	24 August 1972
4	39 years and 93 days	Basil D'Oliveira	Australia	Melbourne Cricket Ground, Melbourne, Australia	5 January 1971
5	38 years and 211 days	Ray Illingworth	Australia	Melbourne Cricket Ground, Melbourne, Australia	5 January 1971
Last updated: 1 July 2020

==== Oldest players ====
The Netherlands batsmen Nolan Clarke is the oldest player to appear in an ODI match. Playing in the 1996 Cricket World Cup against South Africa in 1996 at Rawalpindi Cricket Stadium in Rawalpindi, Pakistan he was aged 47 years and 257 days.

Rank	Age	Player	Opposition	Venue	Date
1	44 years and 361 days	Norman Gifford	Pakistan	Sharjah Cricket Stadium, Sharjah, United Arab Emirates	26 March 1985
2	42 years and 223 days	Bob Taylor	New Zealand	Eden Park, Auckland, New Zealand	25 February 1984
3	42 years and 105 days	Fred Titmus	New Zealand	Basin Reserve, Wellington, New Zealand	9 March 1975
4	41 years and 354 days	Eddie Hemmings	New Zealand	Lancaster Park, Christchurch, New Zealand	9 February 1991
5	41 years and 186 days	Brian Close	Australia	Edgbaston, Birmingham, England	28 August 1972
Last updated: 1 July 2020

== Partnership records ==
In cricket, two batsmen are always present at the crease batting together in a partnership. This partnership will continue until one of them is dismissed, retires or the innings comes to a close.

=== Highest partnerships by wicket ===
A wicket partnership describes the number of runs scored before each wicket falls. The first wicket partnership is between the opening batsmen and continues until the first wicket falls. The second wicket partnership then commences between the not out batsman and the number three batsman. This partnership continues until the second wicket falls. The third wicket partnership then commences between the not out batsman and the new batsman. This continues down to the tenth wicket partnership. When the tenth wicket has fallen, there is no batsman left to partner so the innings is closed.

Wicket	Runs	First batsman	Second batsman	Opposition	Venue	Date	Scorecard
1st wicket	256*	Jason Roy	Alex Hales	Sri Lanka	Edgbaston, Birmingham, England	24 June 2016	Scorecard
2nd wicket	250	Andrew Strauss	Jonathan Trott	Bangladesh	Edgbaston, Birmingham, England	12 July 2010	Scorecard
3rd wicket	221	Joe Root	Jason Roy	Australia	Melbourne Cricket Ground, Melbourne, Australia	14 January 2018	Scorecard
4th wicket	232	Dawid Malan	Jos Butler	South Africa	De Beers Diamond Oval, Kimberley, South Africa	1 February 2023	Scorecard
5th wicket	226*	Eoin Morgan	Ravi Bopara	Ireland	Malahide Cricket Club Ground, Dublin, Ireland	3 September 2013	Scorecard
6th wicket	150	Michael Vaughan	Geraint Jones	Zimbabwe	Queens Sports Club, Bulawayo, Zimbabwe	5 December 2004	Scorecard
7th wicket	177	Jos Buttler	Adil Rashid	New Zealand	Edgbaston, Birmingham, England	9 June 2015	Scorecard
8th wicket	99*	Stuart Broad	Ravi Bopara	India	Old Trafford, Manchester, England	30 August 2007	Scorecard
9th wicket	100	Liam Plunkett	Vikram Solanki	Pakistan	Gaddafi Stadium, Lahore, Pakistan	12 December 2005	Scorecard
10th wicket	57	Harry Brook	Luke Wood	New Zealand	Bay Oval, Mount Maunganui, New Zealand	26 October 2025	Scorecard
Last updated: 26 October 2025

=== Highest partnerships by runs ===
The highest ODI partnership by runs for any wicket is held by the West Indian pairing of Chris Gayle and Marlon Samuels who put together a second wicket partnership of 372 runs during the 2015 Cricket World Cup against Zimbabwe in February 2015. This broke the record of 331 runs set by Indian pair of Sachin Tendulkar and Rahul Dravid against New Zealand in 1999

Runs	Wicket	First batsman	Second batsman	Opposition	Venue	Date	Scorecard
256*	1st wicket	Jason Roy	Alex Hales	Sri Lanka	Edgbaston, Birmingham, England	24 June 2016	Scorecard
250	2nd wicket	Andrew Strauss	Jonathan Trott	Bangladesh	Edgbaston, Birmingham, England	12 July 2010	Scorecard
248	2nd wicket	Joe Root	Alex Hales	Pakistan	Trent Bridge, Nottingham, England	30 August 2016	Scorecard
232	4th wicket	Dawid Malan	Jos Butler	South Africa	De Beers Diamond Oval, Kimberley, South Africa	1 February 2023	Scorecard
226*	5th wicket	Eoin Morgan	Ravi Bopara	Ireland	Malahide Cricket Club Ground, Dublin, Ireland	3 September 2013	Scorecard
226	4th wicket	Andrew Strauss	Andrew Flintoff	West Indies	Lord's, London, England	6 July 2004	Scorecard
Last updated: 1 February 2023

=== Highest overall partnership runs by a pair ===
Rank	Runs	Innings	Players	Highest	Average	100/50	Career span
1	3,336	77	Eoin Morgan & Joe Root	198	47.0	13/9	2013–2021
2	3,009	54	Jonny Bairstow & Jason Roy	174	55.7	14/11	2015–2022
3	2,118	54	Ian Bell & Alastair Cook	178	40.7	3/16	2006–2014
4	1,869	33	Alex Hales & Joe Root	248	56.6	5/10	2014–2019
5	1,843	51	Jos Buttler & Joe Root†	175	38.4	4/9	2013–2026
An asterisk (*) signifies an unbroken partnership (i.e. neither of the batsmen was dismissed before either the end of the allotted overs or the required score being reached). Last updated: 24 September 2026

== Umpiring records ==
=== Most matches umpired ===
An umpire in cricket is a person who officiates the match according to the Laws of Cricket. Two umpires adjudicate the match on the field, whilst a third umpire has access to video replays, and a fourth umpire looks after the match balls and other duties. The records below are only for on-field umpires. Currently active Aleem Dar of Pakistan holds the record for the most ODI matches umpired with 231. The most experienced English umpire is David Shepherd, who stood in 172 ODI matches.

Rank	Matches	Umpire	Period
1	172	David Shepherd	1983–2005
2	140	Ian Gould	2006–2019
3	130	Nigel Llong	2006–2020
4	114	Richard Kettleborough†	2009–2026
5	109	Richard Illingworth†	2010–2026
Last updated: 27 September 2026

== See also ==
- List of One Day International cricket records
- List of England Test cricket records
- List of England Twenty20 International records
