= Indian cricket team in England in 2022 =

International cricket tour

	England	India
- Dates: 7 – 17 July 2022
Captains	Jos Buttler	Rohit Sharma

One Day International series
- Results: India won the 3-match series 2–1
Most runs	Moeen Ali (95)	Rishabh Pant (125)
Most wickets	Reece Topley (9)	Jasprit Bumrah (8)
- Player of the series: Hardik Pandya (Ind)

Twenty20 International series
- Results: India won the 3-match series 2–1
Most runs	Dawid Malan (117)	Suryakumar Yadav (171)
Most wickets	Chris Jordan (8)	Hardik Pandya (5)
- Player of the series: Bhuvneshwar Kumar (Ind)

The India cricket team toured England in July 2022 to play three One Day International (ODI) and three Twenty20 International (T20I) matches against the England cricket team. In September 2021, the England and Wales Cricket Board (ECB) confirmed that India would also play a one-off Test match, after the fifth Test in 2021 was cancelled. The following month, the ECB confirmed that the rescheduled match would determine the outcome of last summer's Test series, and was played ahead of the T20I series.

In June 2022, following the conclusion of England's ODI series in the Netherlands, England's Eoin Morgan announced his retirement from international cricket. As a result, Jos Buttler was appointed as the new captain of England's white-ball teams. Adil Rashid was also made unavailable for the series in order to make the Hajj pilgrimage to Mecca.

India won the first T20I match by 50 runs. India won the second T20I by 49 runs to win the series with a match to play. Despite a century from Suryakumar Yadav, England won the third T20I by 17 runs, with India winning the series 2–1.

In the first ODI match, England were bowled out for 110 runs inside 26 overs, with Jasprit Bumrah taking the best bowling figures for India in an ODI in England. India went on to win by ten wickets, the first time that India had recorded a ten-wicket victory against England in an ODI match. England last lost an ODI match by ten wickets in March 2011, when Sri Lanka beat them in the quarter-finals of the 2011 Cricket World Cup. England won the second ODI by 100 runs to level the series. Reece Topley took his first five-wicket haul and the best bowling figures for England in an ODI match with 6 wickets for 24 runs. India won the third and final match by five wickets to win the series 2–1, with Rishabh Pant scoring his first century in ODI cricket.

== Squads ==
ODIs		T20Is	
England	India	England	India
Jos Buttler (c); Moeen Ali; Jonny Bairstow; Harry Brook; Brydon Carse; Sam Curran; Liam Livingstone; Craig Overton; Matt Parkinson; Joe Root; Jason Roy; Phil Salt; Ben Stokes; Reece Topley; David Willey	Rohit Sharma (c); Jasprit Bumrah; Yuzvendra Chahal; Shikhar Dhawan; Shreyas Iyer; Ravindra Jadeja; Virat Kohli; Ishan Kishan; Prasidh Krishna; Hardik Pandya; Rishabh Pant (wk); Axar Patel; Mohammed Shami; Arshdeep Singh; Mohammed Siraj; Shardul Thakur; Suryakumar Yadav	Jos Buttler (c); Moeen Ali; Harry Brook; Sam Curran; Richard Gleeson; Chris Jordan; Liam Livingstone; Dawid Malan; Tymal Mills; Matt Parkinson; Jason Roy; Phil Salt; Reece Topley; David Willey	Rohit Sharma (c); Ravi Bishnoi; Jasprit Bumrah; Yuzvendra Chahal; Ruturaj Gaikwad; Deepak Hooda; Shreyas Iyer; Venkatesh Iyer; Ravindra Jadeja; Dinesh Karthik (wk); Avesh Khan; Virat Kohli; Ishan Kishan; Bhuvneshwar Kumar; Umran Malik; Hardik Pandya; Rishabh Pant (wk); Axar Patel; Harshal Patel; Sanju Samson; Arshdeep Singh; Rahul Tripathi; Suryakumar Yadav

Ahead of the third ODI match, Harry Brook, Matt Parkinson and Phil Salt were released from England's squad to allow them to play in Finals Day of the 2022 T20 Blast.

== Warm-up matches ==
In April 2022, the ECB confirmed that India would play two T20 warm-up fixtures, against Derbyshire and Northamptonshire. India were also scheduled to play a four-day first-class match against Leicestershire. However, the match was downgraded from its first-class status, with 13 players playing per side, and four of India's team drafted into the Leicestershire squad.

24–27 June 2022
Scorecard

India	v	Leicestershire
246/8d (60.2 overs); K. S. Bharat 70* (111); Roman Walker 5/24 (11 overs)		244 (57 overs); Rishabh Pant 76 (87); Ravindra Jadeja 3/28 (8 overs)
364/9d (92 overs); Virat Kohli 67 (98); Navdeep Saini 3/55 (16 overs)		219/4 (66 overs); Shubman Gill 62 (77); Ravichandran Ashwin 2/31 (11 overs)

Match drawn
Grace Road, Leicestershire
Umpires: Anthony Harris (Eng) and Russell Warren (Eng)

- India won the toss and elected to bat.

1 July 2022
19:00 (N)
Scorecard

Derbyshire; 150/8 (20 overs)	v	India; 151/3 (16.4 overs)
Wayne Madsen 28 (21); Arshdeep Singh 2/29 (4 overs)		Deepak Hooda 59 (37); Ben Aitchison 2/30 (3 overs)

India won by 7 wickets
County Cricket Ground, Derby
Umpires: Peter Hartley (Eng) and Paul Pollard (Eng)

- India won the toss and elected to field.
- Ben Aitchison (Derbyshire) made his T20 debut.

3 July 2022
14:30
Scorecard

India; 149/8 (20 overs)	v	Northamptonshire; 139 (19.3 overs)
Harshal Patel 54 (36); Brandon Glover 3/33 (4 overs)		Saif Zaib 33 (35); Avesh Khan 2/16 (3 overs)

India won by 10 runs
County Cricket Ground, Northampton
Umpires: Naeem Ashraf (Eng) and James Middlebrook (Eng)
Player of the match: Harshal Patel (Ind)

- Northamptonshire won the toss and elected to field.
- Gus Miller (Northamptonshire) made his T20 debut.

== T20I series ==
=== 1st T20I ===
7 July 2022
18:00 (D/N)
Scorecard

India; 198/8 (20 overs)	v	England; 148 (19.3 overs)
Hardik Pandya 51 (33); Chris Jordan 2/23 (4 overs)		Moeen Ali 36 (20); Hardik Pandya 4/33 (4 overs)

India won by 50 runs
Rose Bowl, Southampton
Umpires: David Millns (Eng) and Alex Wharf (Eng)
Player of the match: Hardik Pandya (Ind)

- India won the toss and elected to bat.
- Arshdeep Singh (Ind) made his T20I debut.

=== 2nd T20I ===
9 July 2022
14:30
Scorecard

India; 170/8 (20 overs)	v	England; 121 (17 overs)
Ravindra Jadeja 46* (29); Chris Jordan 4/27 (4 overs)		Moeen Ali 35 (21); Bhuvneshwar Kumar 3/15 (3 overs)

India won by 49 runs
Edgbaston Cricket Ground, Birmingham
Umpires: David Millns (Eng) and Martin Saggers (Eng)
Player of the match: Bhuvneshwar Kumar (Ind)

- England won the toss and elected to field.
- Richard Gleeson (Eng) made his T20I debut.

=== 3rd T20I ===
10 July 2022
14:30
Scorecard

England; 215/7 (20 overs)	v	India; 198/9 (20 overs)
Dawid Malan 77 (39); Ravi Bishnoi 2/30 (4 overs)		Suryakumar Yadav 117 (55); Reece Topley 3/22 (4 overs)

England won by 17 runs
Trent Bridge, Nottingham
Umpires: Martin Saggers (Eng) and Alex Wharf (Eng)
Player of the match: Reece Topley (Eng)

- England won the toss and elected to bat.
- Suryakumar Yadav (Ind) scored his first century in T20Is.

== ODI series ==
=== 1st ODI ===
12 July 2022
13:00 (D/N)
Scorecard

England; 110 (25.2 overs)	v	India; 114/0 (18.4 overs)
Jos Buttler 30 (32); Jasprit Bumrah 6/19 (7.2 overs)		Rohit Sharma 76* (58)

India won by 10 wickets
The Oval, London
Umpires: Richard Illingworth (Eng) and Alex Wharf (Eng)
Player of the match: Jasprit Bumrah (Ind)

- India won the toss and elected to field.
- Shikhar Dhawan (Ind) played in his 150th ODI.
- Mohammed Shami took his 150th wicket in his 80th match, the fastest to the landmark in terms of games played by a bowler for India in ODIs.
- Jasprit Bumrah's took the third-best bowling figures for India in ODIs.
- Rohit Sharma and Shikhar Dhawan (Ind) reached 5,000 partnership runs, becoming the fourth opening pair to do so in ODIs.

=== 2nd ODI ===
14 July 2022
13:00 (D/N)
Scorecard

England; 246 (49 overs)	v	India; 146 (38.5 overs)
Moeen Ali 47 (64) Yuzvendra Chahal 4/47 (10 overs)		Hardik Pandya 29 (44); Ravindra Jadeja 29 (44); Reece Topley 6/24 (9.5 overs)

England won by 100 runs
Lord's, London
Umpires: Richard Kettleborough (Eng) and Alex Wharf (Eng)
Player of the match: Reece Topley (Eng)

- India won the toss and elected to field.
- Reece Topley (Eng) took his first five-wicket haul and the best bowling figures for England in ODIs.

=== 3rd ODI ===
17 July 2022
11:00
Scorecard

England; 259 (45.5 overs)	v	India; 261/5 (42.1 overs)
Jos Buttler 60 (80); Hardik Pandya 4/24 (7 overs)		Rishabh Pant 125* (113); Reece Topley 3/35 (7 overs)

India won by 5 wickets
Old Trafford Cricket Ground, Manchester
Umpires: Richard Illingworth (Eng) and Martin Saggers (Eng)
Player of the match: Rishabh Pant (Ind)

- India won the toss and elected to field.
- Rishabh Pant (Ind) scored his maiden century in ODIs.
