= South African cricket team in England in 2025 =

International cricket tour

	England	South Africa
- Dates: 2 – 14 September 2025
Captains	Harry Brook	Temba Bavuma (ODIs); Aiden Markram (T20Is)

One Day International series
- Results: South Africa won the 3-match series 2–1
Most runs	Joe Root (175)	Aiden Markram (135)
Most wickets	Jofra Archer (8); Adil Rashid (8)	Keshav Maharaj (8)
- Player of the series: Keshav Maharaj (SA)

Twenty20 International series
- Results: 3-match series drawn 1–1
Most runs	Phil Salt (141)	Aiden Markram (69)
Most wickets	Jofra Archer (3); Sam Curran (3)	Corbin Bosch (2); Bjorn Fortuin (2); Marco Jansen (2)
- Player of the series: Phil Salt (Eng)

The South Africa cricket team toured England in September 2025 to play the England cricket team. The tour consisted of three One Day International (ODI) and three Twenty20 International (T20I) matches. In August 2024, the England and Wales Cricket Board (ECB) confirmed the fixtures for the tour, as a part of the 2025 home international season.

== Squads ==
England		South Africa	
ODIs	T20Is	ODIs	T20Is
Harry Brook (c); Rehan Ahmed; Jofra Archer; Sonny Baker; Tom Banton (wk); Jacob Bethell; Jos Buttler (wk); Brydon Carse; Ben Duckett; Will Jacks; Saqib Mahmood; Jamie Overton; Adil Rashid; Joe Root; Jamie Smith (wk)	Harry Brook (c); Rehan Ahmed; Jofra Archer; Tom Banton (wk); Jacob Bethell; Jos Buttler (wk); Brydon Carse; Sam Curran; Liam Dawson; ~~Ben Duckett~~; Will Jacks; Saqib Mahmood; Jamie Overton; Adil Rashid; Phil Salt (wk); Jamie Smith (wk); Luke Wood	Temba Bavuma (c); Corbin Bosch; Matthew Breetzke (wk); Dewald Brevis; Nandre Burger; Tony de Zorzi; Keshav Maharaj; Kwena Maphaka; Aiden Markram; Wiaan Mulder; Senuran Muthusamy; Lungi Ngidi; Lhuan-dre Pretorius (wk); Kagiso Rabada; Ryan Rickelton (wk); Tristan Stubbs; Codi Yusuf	Aiden Markram (c); Corbin Bosch; Dewald Brevis; Nandre Burger; Donovan Ferreira; Bjorn Fortuin; Marco Jansen; ~~Keshav Maharaj~~; Kwena Maphaka; ~~David Miller~~; Senuran Muthusamy; ~~Lungi Ngidi~~; Lhuan-dre Pretorius (wk); Kagiso Rabada; Ryan Rickelton (wk); Tristan Stubbs; Lizaad Williams

On 1 September, Codi Yusuf was added to the ODI squad. On 3 September, Tony de Zorzi was ruled out of the remainder of the ODI series due to a hamstring injury. On 9 September, David Miller was ruled out of the T20I series due to a hamstring injury. On 10 September, Lungi Ngidi was ruled out of the T20I series due to a hamstring injury, and was replaced by Nandre Burger. On the same day Keshav Maharaj was ruled out of the T20I series due to a groin injury, and was replaced by Bjorn Fortuin.

On 5 September, Ben Duckett was rested from the T20I series. He was replaced by Sam Curran.

== ODI series ==
=== 1st ODI ===
2 September 2025
13:00 (D/N)
Scorecard

England; 131 (24.3 overs)	v	South Africa; 137/3 (20.5 overs)
Jamie Smith 54 (48); Keshav Maharaj 4/22 (5.3 overs)		Aiden Markram 86 (55); Adil Rashid 3/26 (3.5 overs)

South Africa won by 7 wickets
Headingley, Leeds
Umpires: Nitin Menon (Ind) and Russell Warren (Eng)
Player of the match: Keshav Maharaj (SA)

- South Africa won the toss and elected to field.
- Sonny Baker (Eng) made his ODI debut.

=== 2nd ODI ===
4 September 2025
13:00 (D/N)
Scorecard

South Africa; 330/8 (50 overs)	v	England; 325/9 (50 overs)
Matthew Breetzke 85 (77); Jofra Archer 4/62 (10 overs)		Jos Buttler 61 (51); Nandre Burger 3/63 (10 overs)

South Africa won by 5 runs
Lord's, London
Umpires: Mike Burns (Eng) and Sharfuddoula (Ban)
Player of the match: Matthew Breetzke (SA)

- England won the toss and elected to field.

=== 3rd ODI ===
7 September 2025
11:00
Scorecard

England; 414/5 (50 overs)	v	South Africa; 72 (20.5 overs)
Jacob Bethell 110 (82); Keshav Maharaj 2/61 (8 overs)		Corbin Bosch 20 (32); Jofra Archer 4/18 (9 overs)

England won by 342 runs
Rose Bowl, Southampton
Umpires: Nitin Menon (Ind) and Russell Warren (Eng)
Player of the match: Jofra Archer (Eng)

- South Africa won the toss and elected to field.
- Codi Yusuf (SA) made his ODI debut.
- Jacob Bethell (Eng) scored his maiden century in ODIs and in professional cricket overall .
- This was England's highest total against South Africa in ODIs.
- This was the biggest winning margin in terms of runs by any side in ODI history.

== T20I series ==
=== 1st T20I ===
10 September 2025
18:30 (N)
Scorecard

South Africa; 97/5 (7.5 overs)	v	England; 54/5 (5 overs)
Aiden Markram 28 (14); Luke Wood 2/22 (2 overs)		Jos Buttler 25 (11); Marco Jansen 2/18 (2 overs)

South Africa won by 14 runs (DLS method)
Sophia Gardens, Cardiff
Umpires: Graham Lloyd (Eng) and Martin Saggers (Eng)
Player of the match: Donovan Ferreira (SA)

- England won the toss and elected to field.
- The match was initially reduced to 9 overs per side due to rain.
- Rain interrupted South Africa's innings at 7.5 overs. England were set a revised target of 69 runs in 5 overs.

=== 2nd T20I ===
12 September 2025
18:30 (N)
Scorecard

England; 304/2 (20 overs)	v	South Africa; 158 (16.1 overs)
Phil Salt 141* (60); Bjorn Fortuin 2/52 (4 overs)		Aiden Markram 41 (20); Jofra Archer 3/25 (3 overs)

England won by 146 runs
Old Trafford Cricket Ground, Manchester
Umpires: Mike Burns (Eng) and Graham Lloyd (Eng)
Player of the match: Phil Salt (Eng)

- South Africa won the toss and elected to field.
- Phil Salt scored the fastest century for England in T20Is (39 balls), and also the highest score by an England batter in T20Is.
- This was England's highest total in T20Is, and also the highest against a full member nation in T20Is.
- The margin of 146 runs was England's biggest winning margin (by runs) in T20Is and also South Africa's biggest defeat (by runs) in T20Is and the highest number of runs they had conceded in a T20I.

=== 3rd T20I ===
14 September 2025
14:30
Scorecard

England	v	South Africa

Match abandoned
Trent Bridge, Nottingham
Umpires: Martin Saggers (Eng) and Russell Warren (Eng)

- No toss.
- No play was possible due to rain.
