= English cricket team in the West Indies in 2023–24 =

International cricket tour

	West Indies	England
- Dates: 3 – 21 December 2023
Captains	Shai Hope (ODIs); Rovman Powell (T20Is)	Jos Buttler

One Day International series
- Results: West Indies won the 3-match series 2–1
Most runs	Shai Hope (192)	Will Jacks (116)
Most wickets	Gus Atkinson (6)	Romario Shepherd (5)
- Player of the series: Shai Hope (WI)

Twenty20 International series
- Results: West Indies won the 5-match series 3–2
Most runs	Nicholas Pooran (149)	Phil Salt (331)
Most wickets	Andre Russell (7)	Adil Rashid (9)
- Player of the series: Phil Salt (Eng)

The England cricket team toured the West Indies in December 2023 to play three One Day International (ODI) and five Twenty20 International (T20I) matches. The International Cricket Council (ICC) finalized the bilateral series in a press release. In May 2023, Cricket West Indies (CWI) announced the schedule for the series. The T20I series formed part of both teams' preparation for the 2024 ICC Men's T20 World Cup tournament.

During the third and final ODI of the series, West Indies players wore black armbands to mourn the deaths of former West Indies cricketers Joe Solomon and Clyde Butts and a minute's silence was observed prior to the start of the match. The West Indies won the 3-match ODI series 2-1 by defeating England in the final rain-affected match by 4 wickets.

The West Indies also won the 5-match T20I series 3–2.

== Squads ==
West Indies		England	
T20Is	ODIs	T20Is	ODIs
Rovman Powell (c); Shai Hope (vc, wk); Johnson Charles; Roston Chase; Matthew Forde; Shimron Hetmyer; Jason Holder; Akeal Hosein; Alzarri Joseph; Brandon King; Kyle Mayers; Gudakesh Motie; Nicholas Pooran (wk); Andre Russell; Sherfane Rutherford; Romario Shepherd; Oshane Thomas	Shai Hope (c, wk); Alzarri Joseph (vc); Alick Athanaze; Yannic Cariah; Keacy Carty; Roston Chase; ~~Shane Dowrich~~; Matthew Forde; Shimron Hetmyer; Brandon King; Gudakesh Motie; Kjorn Ottley; Sherfane Rutherford; Romario Shepherd; Oshane Thomas	Jos Buttler (c, wk); Rehan Ahmed; Moeen Ali; Gus Atkinson; Harry Brook; Sam Curran; Ben Duckett; Will Jacks; Liam Livingstone; Tymal Mills; Adil Rashid; Phil Salt (wk); ~~Josh Tongue~~; Reece Topley; John Turner; Chris Woakes	Jos Buttler (c, wk); Rehan Ahmed; Gus Atkinson; Harry Brook; Brydon Carse; Zak Crawley; Sam Curran; Ben Duckett; Tom Hartley; Will Jacks; Liam Livingstone; Ollie Pope; Matthew Potts; Phil Salt (wk); ~~Josh Tongue~~; John Turner

On 23 November 2023, Josh Tongue was ruled out from entire tour due to an injury, with Matthew Potts named as his replacement in England's ODI squad.

On 30 November 2023, Shane Dowrich announced his retirement from international cricket with immediate effect, and was withdrawn from the West Indies' ODI squad with no replacement named.

For the last two T20Is, Shimron Hetmyer was dropped and Alzarri Joseph was rested, with Johnson Charles and Oshane Thomas were named their respective replacements in the West Indies' squad.

== ODI series ==
=== 1st ODI ===
3 December 2023
9:30
Scorecard

England; 325 (50 overs)	v	West Indies; 326/6 (48.5 overs)
Harry Brook 71 (72); Gudakesh Motie 2/49 (10 overs)		Shai Hope 109* (83); Rehan Ahmed 2/40 (10 overs)

West Indies won by 4 wickets
Sir Vivian Richards Stadium, Antigua
Umpires: Gregory Brathwaite (WI) and Chris Brown (NZ)
Player of the match: Shai Hope (WI)

- England won the toss and elected to bat.
- Sherfane Rutherford (WI) made his ODI debut.
- Shai Hope (WI) scored his 5,000th run in ODIs.
- Sam Curran recorded the worst bowling figures by an English male cricketer in an ODI (0/98).
- West Indies scored the highest total by a team in an ODI innings at this venue (326).

=== 2nd ODI ===
6 December 2023
13:30 (D/N)
Scorecard

West Indies; 202 (39.4 overs)	v	England; 206/4 (32.5 overs)
Shai Hope 68 (68); Sam Curran 3/33 (7 overs)		Will Jacks 73 (72); Gudakesh Motie 2/34 (7.5 overs)

England won by 6 wickets
Sir Vivian Richards Stadium, Antigua
Umpires: Nigel Duguid (WI) and Nitin Menon (Ind)
Player of the match: Sam Curran (Eng)

- England won the toss and elected to field.
- Jos Buttler (Eng) scored his 5,000th run in ODIs.

=== 3rd ODI ===
9 December 2023
13:30 (D/N)
Scorecard

England; 206/9 (40 overs)	v	West Indies; 191/6 (31.4 overs)
Ben Duckett 71 (73); Matthew Forde 3/29 (8 overs)		Keacy Carty 50 (58); Will Jacks 3/22 (7 overs)

West Indies won by 4 wickets (DLS method)
Kensington Oval, Barbados
Umpires: Chris Brown (NZ) and Leslie Reifer (WI)
Player of the match: Matthew Forde (WI)

- West Indies won the toss and elected to field.
- The match was reduced to 40 overs per side due to rain.
- Matthew Forde (WI) made his ODI debut.
- West Indies were set a revised target of 188 runs from 34 overs due to rain.
- This was the first ODI series win for West Indies over England in the Caribbean for 25 years.

== T20I series ==
=== 1st T20I ===
12 December 2023
18:00 (N)
Scorecard

England; 171 (19.3 overs)	v	West Indies; 172/6 (18.1 overs)
Phil Salt 40 (20); Andre Russell 3/19 (4 overs)		Shai Hope 36 (30); Rehan Ahmed 3/39 (4 overs)

West Indies won by 4 wickets
Kensington Oval, Barbados
Umpires: Nigel Duguid (WI) and Patrick Gustard (WI)
Player of the match: Andre Russell (WI)

- West Indies won the toss and elected to field.
- Adil Rashid (Eng) played in his 100th T20I, and became the first male cricketer from England to take 100 wickets in T20Is.

=== 2nd T20I ===
14 December 2023
13:30
Scorecard

West Indies; 176/7 (20 overs)	v	England; 166/7 (20 overs)
Brandon King 82* (52); Adil Rashid 2/11 (4 overs)		Sam Curran 50 (32); Alzarri Joseph 3/39 (4 overs)

West Indies won by 10 runs
National Cricket Stadium, Grenada
Umpires: Gregory Brathwaite (WI) and Jacqueline Williams (WI)
Player of the match: Brandon King (WI)

- England won the toss and elected to field.
- Jacqueline Williams became the first female umpire from the West Indies to stand in a men's T20I involving two Full-Member teams.

=== 3rd T20I ===
16 December 2023
13:30
Scorecard

West Indies; 222/6 (20 overs)	v	England; 226/3 (19.5 overs)
Nicholas Pooran 82 (45); Adil Rashid 2/32 (4 overs)		Phil Salt 109* (56); Gudakesh Motie 1/30 (4 overs)

England won by 7 wickets
National Cricket Stadium, Grenada
Umpires: Nigel Duguid (WI) and Leslie Reifer (WI)
Player of the match: Phil Salt (Eng)

- England won the toss and elected to field.
- Phil Salt (Eng) scored his first century in T20Is.

=== 4th T20I ===
19 December 2023
16:00 (D/N)
Scorecard

England; 267/3 (20 overs)	v	West Indies; 192 (15.3 overs)
Phil Salt 119 (57); Akeal Hosein 1/36 (4 overs)		Andre Russell 51 (25); Reece Topley 3/27 (3.3 overs)

England won by 75 runs
Brian Lara Cricket Academy, Trinidad and Tobago
Umpires: Gregory Brathwaite (WI) and Patrick Gustard (WI)
Player of the match: Phil Salt (Eng)

- West Indies won the toss and elected to field.
- Phil Salt recorded England's highest individual score in a T20I (119).
- Phil Salt became the first England men's batter to score multiple T20I centuries.
- England recorded their highest total in T20Is.
- England also recorded the second highest total in T20Is among full member teams.

=== 5th T20I ===
21 December 2023
16:00 (D/N)
Scorecard

England; 132 (19.3 overs)	v	West Indies; 133/6 (19.2 overs)
Phil Salt 38 (22); Gudakesh Motie 3/24 (4 overs)		Shai Hope 43* (43); Reece Topley 2/17 (4 overs)

West Indies won by 4 wickets
Brian Lara Cricket Academy, Trinidad and Tobago
Umpires: Nigel Duguid (WI) and Leslie Reifer (WI)
Player of the match: Gudakesh Motie (WI)

- West Indies won the toss and elected to field.
- Johnson Charles (WI) scored his 1,000th run in T20Is.
