= 2022 Northern Superchargers season =

Northern Superchargers
2022 season
- Coach: (England) James Foster (Men's team) (England) Danielle Hazell (Women's team)
- Captain: (South Africa) Faf du Plessis (Men's team) (England) Hollie Armitage (Women's team)
- Overseas player: (South Africa) Faf du Plessis (Cricket West Indies) Dwayne Bravo (South Africa) Wayne Parnell (Pakistan) Wahab Riaz (Namibia) David Wiese (Men's team) (Australia) Alyssa Healy (India) Jemimah Rodrigues (South Africa) Laura Wolvaardt (Australia) Heather Graham (Republic of Ireland) Gaby Lewis (Women's team)
- Ground(s): Headingley
- The Hundred (Men's): 6th
- The Hundred (Women's): 5th
- Most runs: Laura Wolvaardt: 286 (Women's team); Adam Hose: 182 (Men's team)
- Most wickets: Dwayne Bravo & Adil Rashid: 8 (Men's team); Alice Davidson-Richards: 7 (Women's team)

The 2022 season was the Northern Superchargers second season of the 100 ball franchise cricket, The Hundred. Neither the men's or women's teams could improve from the 2021 season, with both teams finishing in the bottom half of their groups.

== Players ==
=== Men's side ===
- **Bold** denotes players with international caps.

S/N	Name	Nat.	Date of birth (age)	Batting style	Bowling style	Notes
Batters
9	**Adam Lyth**	(England)	25 September 1987 (age 38)	Left-handed	Right-arm off break	
13	**Faf du Plessis**	(South Africa)	13 July 1984 (age 41)	Right-handed	Right-arm leg break	Captain; Overseas player
21	Adam Hose	(England)	25 October 1992 (age 33)	Right-handed	Right-arm medium	
88	**Harry Brook**	(England)	22 February 1999 (age 26)	Right-handed	Right-arm medium	
—	**Luke Wright**	(England)	7 March 1985 (age 40)	Right-handed	Right-arm medium	Ruled out
—	Saif Zaib	(England)	22 May 1998 (age 27)	Left-handed	Slow left-arm orthodox	Replacement player
All Rounders
15	**David Willey**	(England)	28 February 1990 (age 35)	Left-handed	Left-arm fast-medium	
16	Jordan Clark	(England)	14 October 1990 (age 35)	Right-handed	Right-arm fast-medium	Replacement player
47	**Dwayne Bravo**	(Cricket West Indies)	7 October 1983 (age 42)	Right-handed	Right-arm medium	Overseas player; Ruled out
52	**Roelof van der Merwe**	(Netherlands) (Note: Van der Merwe has also played international cricket for South Africa.)	31 December 1984 (age 40)	Right-handed	Slow left-arm orthodox	
55	**Ben Stokes**	(England)	4 June 1991 (age 34)	Left-handed	Right-arm fast-medium	Centrally Contracted player; Ruled out
96	**David Wiese**	(Namibia) (Note: Wiese has also played international cricket for South Africa.)	18 May 1985 (age 40)	Right-handed	Right-arm medium	Overseas player
Wicketkeepers
19	Michael Pepper	(England)	25 June 1998 (age 27)	Right-handed	—	Replacement player
20	**John Simpson**	(England)	13 July 1988 (age 37)	Left-handed	—	
Pace bowlers
7	**Wahab Riaz**	(Pakistan)	28 June 1985 (age 40)	Right-handed	Left-arm fast	Overseas player; Ruled out through injury
8	**Wayne Parnell**	(South Africa)	30 July 1989 (age 36)	Left-handed	Left-arm fast-medium	Overseas player; Replacement player
35	**Matthew Potts**	(England)	29 October 1998 (age 27)	Right-handed	Right-arm fast-medium	
44	Ben Raine	(England)	14 September 1991 (age 34)	Left-handed	Right-arm fast-medium	Wildcard player
77	Craig Miles	(England)	20 July 1994 (age 31)	Right-handed	Right-arm fast-medium	Replacement player
99	**Brydon Carse**	(England)	31 July 1995 (age 30)	Right-handed	Right-arm fast-medium	Ruled out through injury
Spin bowlers
10	Callum Parkinson	(England)	24 October 1996 (age 29)	Right-handed	Slow left-arm orthodox	
95	**Adil Rashid**	(England)	17 February 1988 (age 37)	Right-handed	Right-arm leg break	

=== Women's side ===
- **Bold** denotes players with international caps.

S/N	Name	Nat.	Date of birth (age)	Batting style	Bowling style	Notes
Batters
5	**Jemimah Rodrigues**	(India)	5 September 2000 (age 25)	Right-handed	Right-arm off break	Overseas player; Ruled out through injury
14	**Laura Wolvaardt**	(South Africa)	26 April 1999 (age 26)	Right-handed	—	Overseas player
57	Hollie Armitage	(England)	14 June 1997 (age 28)	Right-handed	Right-arm leg break	Captain
66	**Gaby Lewis**	(Ireland)	27 March 2001 (age 24)	Right-handed	Right-arm leg break	Overseas player; Replacement player
All Rounders
7	Lucy Higham	(England)	17 October 1997 (age 28)	Right-handed	Right-arm off break	
9	Kalea Moore	(England)	27 March 2003 (age 22)	Right-handed	Right-arm off break	
11	**Heather Graham**	(Australia)	5 October 1996 (age 29)	Right-handed	Right-arm medium	Overseas player
24	**Alice Davidson-Richards**	(England)	29 May 1994 (age 31)	Right-handed	Right-arm fast-medium	
—	Bethany Harmer	(England)	30 October 2000 (age 25)	Right-handed	Right-arm off break	
Wicketkeepers
10	Bess Heath	(England)	20 August 2001 (age 24)	Right-handed	—	
77	**Alyssa Healy**	(Australia)	24 March 1990 (age 35)	Right-handed	—	Overseas player
Pace bowlers
20	**Jenny Gunn**	(England)	9 May 1986 (age 39)	Right-handed	Right-arm medium	
42	**Beth Langston**	(England)	6 September 1992 (age 33)	Right-handed	Right-arm medium	Ruled out through injury
45	Elizabeth Russell	(England)	22 May 1994 (age 31)	Left-handed	Right-arm medium	
72	**Rachel Slater**	(Scotland)	20 November 2001 (age 24)	Right-handed	Left-arm medium	
Spin bowlers
23	Katie Levick	(England)	17 July 1991 (age 34)	Right-handed	Right-arm leg break	
50	**Linsey Smith**	(England)	10 March 1995 (age 30)	Left-handed	Slow left-arm orthodox	

== Group fixtures ==
=== Fixtures (Men) ===
5 August 2022
18:30 (N)
Scorecard

(H) Manchester Originals; 161/4 (100 balls)	v	Northern Superchargers; 162/4 (94 balls)
Jos Buttler 59 (41); David Willey 2/24 (20 balls)		Adam Lyth 51 (30); Ashton Turner 1/7 (5 balls)

Northern Superchargers won by 6 wickets
Old Trafford, Manchester
Umpires: Rob Bailey (Eng) and Neil Mallender (Eng)
Player of the match: Adam Lyth (Northern Superchargers)

- Northern Superchargers won the toss and elected to field.
- Points: Northern Superchargers 2, Manchester Originals 0.

9 August 2022
18:30 (N)
Scorecard

(H) Northern Superchargers; 152/8 (100 balls)	v	Trent Rockets; 155/3 (94 balls)
David Wiese 50 (27); Daniel Sams 3/31 (20 balls)		Dawid Malan 88* (49); Dwayne Bravo 1/28 (20 balls)

Trent Rockets won by 7 wickets
Headingley, Leeds
Umpires: Ian Blackwell (Eng) and David Millns (Eng)
Player of the match: Dawid Malan (Trent Rockets)

- Trent Rockets won the toss and elected to field.
- Points: Trent Rockets 2, Northern Superchargers 0.

11 August 2022
15:00
Scorecard

Northern Superchargers; 157/7 (100 balls)	v	Oval Invincibles (H); 158/7 (97 balls)
Adam Lyth 79 (33); Sunil Narine 3/11 (20 balls)		Sam Curran 60 (39); Dwayne Bravo 2/29 (20 balls)

Oval Invincibles won by 3 wickets
The Oval, London
Umpires: Rob Bailey (Eng) and Alex Wharf (Eng)
Player of the match: Sam Curran (Oval Invincibles)

- Oval Invincibles won the toss and elected to field.
- Points: Oval Invincibles 2, Northern Superchargers 0.

14 August 2022
14:30
Scorecard

(H) Northern Superchargers; 143/5 (100 balls)	v	London Spirit; 147/3 (82 balls)
Faf du Plessis 56 (35); Mason Crane 2/23 (20 balls)		Adam Rossington 66 (25); Adil Rashid 1/29 (15 balls)

London Spirit won by 7 wickets
Headlingley, Leeds
Umpires: Graham Lloyd (Eng) and Rob White (Eng)
Player of the match: Adam Rossington (London Spirit)

- Northern Superchargers won the toss and elected to bat.
- Points: London Spirit 2, Northern Superchargers 0.

19 August 2022
19:00 (N)
Scorecard

Northern Superchargers; 169/6 (100 balls)	v	Birmingham Phoenix (H); 137/9 (100 balls)
Adam Lyth 56 (26); Moeen Ali 2/13 (15 balls)		Miles Hammond 31 (27); David Wiese 3/15 (20 balls)

Northern Superchargers won by 32 runs
Edgbaston, Birmingham
Umpires: James Middlebrook (Eng) and Steve O'Shaughnessy (Eng)
Player of the match: David Wiese (Northern Superchargers)

- Birmingham Phoenix won the toss and elected to field.
- Points: Northern Superchargers 2, Birmingham Phoenix 0.

21 August 2022
19:00 (N)
Scorecard

Manchester Originals; 208/5 (100 balls)	v	Northern Superchargers (H); 185/7 (100 balls)
Phil Salt 55 (25); Dwayne Bravo 2/42 (20 balls)		Adam Hose 59 (27); Paul Walter 3/27 (20 balls)

Manchester Originals won by 23 runs
Headingley, Leeds
Umpires: Mike Burns (Eng) and Rob White (Eng)
Player of the match: Phil Salt (Manchester Originals)

- Northern Superchargers won the toss and elected to field.
- Points: Manchester Originals 2, Northern Superchargers 0.

26 August 2022
19:00 (N)
Scorecard

(H) Welsh Fire; 114/4 (100 balls)	v	Northern Superchargers; 116/4 (91 balls)
Ben Duckett 64* (48); Craig Miles 2/30 (20 balls)		Adam Lyth 47 (34); Ish Sodhi 2/14 (20 balls)

Northern Superchargers won by 6 wickets
Sophia Gardens, Cardiff
Umpires: Richard Kettleborough (Eng) and Tom Lungley (Eng)
Player of the match: Adam Lyth (Northern Superchargers)

- Welsh Fire won the toss and elected to bat.
- Points: Northern Superchargers 2, Welsh Fire 0.

31 August 2022
15:00
Scorecard

(H) Northern Superchargers; 135/8 (100 balls)	v	Southern Brave; 119/9 (100 balls)
Harry Brook 29 (17); Rehan Ahmed 2/20 (20 balls); James Fuller 2/20 (20 balls)		Rehan Ahmed 33 (29); Wayne Parnell 4/16 (20 balls)

Northern Superchargers won by 16 runs
Headingley, Leeds
Umpires: Neil Mallender (Eng) and Steve O'Shaughnessy (Eng)
Player of the match: Wayne Parnell (Northern Superchargers)

- Southern Brave won the toss and elected to field.
- Points: Northern Superchargers 2, Southern Brave 0.

=== Fixtures (Women) ===
Due to the shortened women's competition, Northern Superchargers didn't play against Trent Rockets.

11 August 2022
18:30 (N)
Scorecard

Northern Superchargers; 143/5 (100 balls)	v	Oval Invincibles (H); 146/1 (84 balls)
Jemimah Rodrigues 51 (32); Ryana MacDonald-Gay 2/25 (15 balls)		Lauren Winfield-Hill 74* (42); Jenny Gunn 1/22 (15 balls)

Oval Invincibles won by 9 wickets
The Oval, London
Umpires: Sarah Bartlett (Eng) and Rob White (Eng)
Player of the match: Lauren Winfield-Hill (Oval Invincibles)

- Oval Invincibles won the toss and elected to field.
- Points: Oval Invincibles 2, Northern Superchargers 0.

14 August 2022
11:00
Scorecard

(H) Northern Superchargers; 127/4 (100 balls)	v	London Spirit; 122/7 (100 balls)
Bess Heath 57 (34); Amelia Kerr 2/27 (20 balls)		Sophie Luff 39* (30); Alice Davidson-Richards 2/20 (20 balls)

Northern Superchargers won by 5 runs
Headlingley, Leeds
Umpires: Claire Polosak (Aus) and Neil Pratt (Eng)
Player of the match: Bess Heath (Northern Superchargers)

- London Spirit won the toss and elected to field.
- Points: Northern Superchargers 2, London Spirit 0.

19 August 2022
15:30
Scorecard

(H) Birmingham Phoenix; 153/4 (100 balls)	v	Northern Superchargers; 148/5 (100 balls)
Amy Jones 48 (28); Alice Davidson-Richards 3/30 (20 balls)		Alyssa Healy 46 (28); Sophie Molineux 2/11 (20 balls)

Birmingham Phoenix won by 5 runs
Edgbaston, Birmingham
Umpires: Paul Baldwin (Eng) and Anna Harris (Eng)
Player of the match: Sophie Molineux (Birmingham Phoenix)

- Northern Superchargers won the toss and elected to field.
- Points: Birmingham Phoenix 2, Northern Superchargers 0.

21 August 2022
15:30
Scorecard

Manchester Originals; 160/3 (100 balls)	v	Northern Superchargers (H); 161/3 (99 balls)
Deandra Dottin 68* (30); Katie Levick 1/21 (20 balls)		Laura Wolvaardt 90* (49); Emma Lamb 1/23 (15 balls)

Northern Superchargers won by 7 wickets
Headingley, Leeds
Umpires: Sue Redfern (Eng) and Chris Watts (Eng)
Player of the match: Laura Wolvaardt (Northern Superchargers)

- Manchester Originals won the toss and elected to bat.
- Points: Northern Superchargers 2, Manchester Originals 0.

26 August 2022
15:30
Scorecard

(H) Welsh Fire; 123/6 (100 balls)	v	Northern Superchargers; 112/6 (100 balls)
Sarah Bryce 36 (30); Jenny Gunn 2/20 (15 balls)		Laura Wolvaardt 41 (38); Nicola Carey 3/18 (20 balls)

Welsh Fire won by 11 runs
Sophia Gardens, Cardiff
Umpires: Neil Bainton (Eng) and Jasmine Naeem (Eng)
Player of the match: Nicola Carey (Welsh Fire)

- Welsh Fire won the toss and elected to bat.
- Points: Welsh Fire 2, Northern Superchargers 0.

31 August 2022
11:30
Scorecard

(H) Northern Superchargers; 145/6 (100 balls)	v	Southern Brave; 125/9 (100 balls)
Laura Wolvaardt 50 (35); Amanda-Jade Wellington 3/17 (20 balls)		Sophia Dunkley 38 (30); Katie Levick 2/10 (20 balls)

Northern Superchargers won by 20 runs
Headingley, Leeds
Umpires: Hassan Adnan (Eng) and Sue Redfern (Eng)
Player of the match: Laura Wolvaardt (Northern Superchargers)

- Southern Brave won the toss and elected to field.
- Points: Northern Superchargers 2, Southern Brave 0.

== Standings ==
=== Women ===
Pos	Team	Pld	W	L	T	NR	Pts	NRR
1	Oval Invincibles	6	5	1	0	0	10	1.098
2	Southern Brave	6	5	1	0	0	10	0.806
3	Trent Rockets	6	3	3	0	0	6	0.101
4	Birmingham Phoenix	6	3	3	0	0	6	−0.031
5	Northern Superchargers	6	3	3	0	0	6	−0.119
6	Manchester Originals	6	2	4	0	0	4	−0.478
7	London Spirit	6	2	4	0	0	4	−0.557
8	Welsh Fire	6	1	5	0	0	2	−0.681

Source: BBC Sport, ESPN Cricinfo

advances to Final
advances to the Eliminator

=== Men ===
Pos	Team	Pld	W	L	T	NR	Pts	NRR
1	Trent Rockets	8	6	2	0	0	12	0.576
2	Manchester Originals	8	5	3	0	0	10	0.908
3	London Spirit	8	5	3	0	0	10	0.338
4	Birmingham Phoenix	8	5	3	0	0	10	−0.172
5	Oval Invincibles	8	4	4	0	0	8	0.385
6	Northern Superchargers	8	4	4	0	0	8	0.009
7	Southern Brave	8	3	5	0	0	6	−0.593
8	Welsh Fire	8	0	8	0	0	0	−1.442

Source: BBC Sport, ESPN Cricinfo

advances to Final
advances to the Eliminator
