= List of Sunrisers Leeds cricketers =

Sunrisers Leeds (formerly Northern Superchargers) were formed in 2019, and played their first Hundred match in the 2021 season of The Hundred against Welsh Fire for both the Men's team and the Women's team. Hundred matches are classed as Twenty20 matches and so have Twenty20 status or Women's Twenty20 status. The players in this list have all played at least one Hundred match for the Sunrisers Leeds Men's or Women's team.

Players are listed in order of appearance, where players made their debut in the same match, they are ordered by batting order. Players in Bold were overseas players for the Northern Superchargers.

== Key ==
**General**

- ♠ – Captain
- † – Wicket-keeper
- **First** – Year of debut for Northern Superchargers
- **Last** – Year of latest match played for Northern Superchargers
- **Mat** – Number of matches played for Northern Superchargers
- **Win%** – Winning percentage

**Batting**

- **Inn** – Number of innings batted
- **NO** – Number of innings not out
- **Runs** – Runs scored in career
- **HS** – Highest score
- **100** – Centuries scored
- **50** – Half-centuries scored
- **Avg** – Runs scored per dismissal
- * – Batsman remained not out

**Bowling**

- **Balls** – Balls bowled in career
- **Wkt** – Wickets taken in career
- **BBI** – Best bowling in an innings
- **BBM** – Best bowling in a match
- **Ave** – Average runs per wicket

**Fielding**

- **Ca** – Catches taken
- **St** – Stumpings effected

== List of players ==
=== Women's players ===
No.	Name	Nationality	First	Last	Mat	Runs	HS	Avg	Balls	Wkt	BBI	Ave	Ca	St
No.	Name	Nationality	First	Last	Mat	Batting			Bowling				Fielding	
1	Lauren Winfield-Hill ♠†	England	2021	2026	17	254	64	17.93	0	0	–	–	2	7
2	**Jemimah Rodrigues**	India	2021	2023	19	453	92*	26.64	10	0	–	–	3	0
3	**Laura Wolvaardt**	South Africa	2021	2022	13	467	90*	51.88	0	0	–	–	8	0
4	Hollie Armitage ♠	England	2021	2025	36	430	46	16.53	33	2	1/8	29.50	10	0
5	Bess Heath †	England	2021	2025	39	257	57	9.88	0	0	–	–	13	5
6	Alice Davidson-Richards	England	2021	2025	40	493	50	20.54	368	24	3/20	22.70	14	0
7	**Laura Kimmince**	Australia	2021	2021	6	61	31	20.33	0	0	–	–	4	0
8	Linsey Smith	England	2021	2025	37	64	17*	12.80	711	42	3/12	19.64	14	0
9	Elizabeth Russell	England	2021	2022	8	1	1*	–	105	2	1/24	67.50	4	0
10	Phoebe Graham	England	2021	2021	4	1	1*	–	45	0	–	–	1	0
11	Katie Levick	England	2021	2022	13	–	–	–	230	13	2/10	19.00	1	0
12	Kalea Moore	England	2021	2021	5	11	11	11.00	73	4	2/9	21.25	0	0
13	Rachel Slater	Scotland	2021	2022	3	–	–	–	20	0	–	–	0	0
14	Sterre Kalis	Netherlands	2021	2021	1	19	19	19.00	0	0	–	–	0	0
15	Beth Langston	England	2021	2022	5	0	0*	–	69	0	–	–	0	0
16	**Alyssa Healy** †	Australia	2022	2022	6	129	46	21.50	0	0	–	–	4	4
17	Jenny Gunn	England	2022	2022	6	29	15*	–	75	4	2/20	29.75	3	0
18	Lucy Higham	England	2022	2025	31	57	26	19.00	267	16	3/29	20.87	8	0
19	**Gaby Lewis**	Ireland	2022	2022	1	16	16	16.00	0	0	–	–	1	0
20	**Heather Graham**	Australia	2022	2022	3	39	26	19.50	60	2	1/24	39.00	3	0
21	Marie Kelly	England	2023	2024	13	190	69*	17.27	0	0	–	–	4	0
22	**Phoebe Litchfield**	Australia	2023	2026	37	1,045	71*	33.71	0	0	–	–	15	0
23	**Georgia Wareham**	Australia	2023	2025	19	171	29*	24.42	347	19	3/7	20.42	12	0
24	Leah Dobson	England	2023	2023	5	4	3	2.00	0	0	–	–	2	0
25	Kate Cross	England	2023	2026	36	64	15*	9.14	596	37	4/20	20.05	18	0
26	Grace Ballinger	England	2023	2025	27	2	1*	2.00	403	19	3/22	24.26	3	0
27	**Annabel Sutherland**	Australia	2024	2026	27	733	63*	48.87	520	37	4/11	15.11	15	0
28	Davina Perrin	England	2024	2025	14	293	101	22.53	0	0	–	–	2	0
29	Katherine Fraser	Scotland	2025	2025	2	4	4	4.00	10	1	1/11	11.00	0	0
30	**Nicola Carey**	Australia	2025	2025	6	99	35*	–	120	6	2/13	25.16	3	0
31	Bryony Smith	England	2026	2026	10	153	48	15.30	0	0	–	–	2	0
32	**Jess Jonassen**	Australia	2026	2026	10	79	19	15.80	165	8	3/21	25.50	2	0
33	Dani Gibson ♠	England	2026	2026	10	113	25	18.83	90	6	2/17	23.33	3	0
34	**Deepti Sharma**	India	2026	2026	10	69	28*	23.00	145	13	3/11	13.53	4	0
35	Sophia Turner	England	2026	2026	2	1	1	1.00	0	0	–	–	0	0
36	Cassidy McCarthy	England	2026	2026	10	2	2	1.00	115	5	2/14	27.20	2	0
37	Hannah Baker	England	2026	2026	10	7	4*	–	150	11	2/13	14.18	0	0
38	Darcey Carter	Scotland	2026	2026	9	7	6	3.50	0	0	–	–	0	0

=== Men's players ===
No.	Name	Nationality	First	Last	Mat	Runs	HS	Avg	Balls	Wkt	BBI	Ave	Ca	St
No.	Name	Nationality	First	Last	Mat	Batting			Bowling				Fielding	
1	Adam Lyth	England	2021	2023	17	368	79	23.00	20	2	2/23	11.50	4	0
2	**Chris Lynn**	Australia	2021	2021	7	150	48	21.42	0	0	–	–	0	0
3	Ben Stokes ♠	England	2021	2024	5	14	5	3.50	57	3	2/24	27.00	0	0
4	Harry Brook ♠	England	2021	2026	44	1,157	105*	36.16	0	0	–	–	20	0
5	David Willey ♠	England	2021	2022	13	222	81*	20.18	204	10	2/9	30.00	4	0
6	Tom Kohler-Cadmore	England	2021	2021	4	111	71	27.75	0	0	–	–	3	0
7	John Simpson †	England	2021	2022	11	183	71*	22.87	0	0	–	–	11	2
8	Brydon Carse	England	2021	2026	22	105	33*	11.67	312	17	3/17	30.94	7	0
9	Matthew Potts	England	2021	2026	35	91	24	15.17	589	27	3/22	35.04	10	0
10	Adil Rashid	England	2021	2025	40	54	13	6.75	722	45	4/18	20.28	7	0
11	**Mujeeb Ur Rahman**	Afghanistan	2021	2021	7	0	0	0.00	130	6	2/6	26.16	2	0
12	Callum Parkinson	England	2021	2024	11	4	2*	4.00	200	11	2/19	27.27	3	0
13	**Dane Vilas**	South Africa	2021	2021	5	95	36	31.66	0	0	–	–	3	0
14	Jordan Thompson	England	2021	2021	3	36	27	18.00	0	0	–	–	0	0
15	Ben Raine	England	2021	2022	8	35	18	17.50	113	10	3/15	18.90	2	0
16	Matthew Fisher	England	2021	2021	1	0	0	0.00	14	0	–	–	0	0
17	**Faf du Plessis** ♠	South Africa	2022	2022	8	134	56	16.75	0	0	–	–	2	0
18	Michael Pepper †	England	2022	2025	14	139	28	13.90	0	0	–	–	4	0
19	**David Wiese** ♠	Namibia	2022	2023	15	230	54*	19.16	205	7	3/15	52.85	8	0
20	Adam Hose	England	2022	2024	24	408	59	24.00	0	0	–	–	6	0
21	Roelof van der Merwe	Netherlands	2022	2022	5	45	30	45.00	35	1	1/32	66.00	3	0
22	**Dwayne Bravo**	West Indies	2022	2022	6	27	19	13.50	120	8	2/29	22.75	1	0
23	Craig Miles	England	2022	2022	6	1	1*	–	74	4	2/30	33.75	3	0
24	**Wahab Riaz**	Pakistan	2022	2022	1	–	–	–	10	0	–	–	0	0
25	**Wayne Parnell** ♠	South Africa	2022	2023	9	50	14*	25.00	155	12	4/16	20.75	0	0
26	Tom Banton †	England	2023	2023	8	145	81	20.71	0	0	–	–	1	2
27	**Matthew Short** ♠	Australia	2023	2024	15	216	73	16.61	95	4	2/9	33.75	6	0
28	Reece Topley	England	2023	2026	13	24	12*	–	205	17	3/29	19.12	2	0
29	Saif Zaib	England	2023	2023	6	60	21	15.00	0	0	–	–	2	0
30	Ollie Robinson †	England	2024	2024	8	89	25	17.80	0	0	–	–	0	0
31	Graham Clark	England	2024	2025	9	179	38*	25.57	0	0	–	–	1	0
32	**Nicholas Pooran** †	West Indies	2024	2024	8	227	66*	45.40	0	0	–	–	5	2
33	Michael Jones	Scotland	2024	2024	1	7	7	7.00	0	0	–	–	1	0
34	Jordan Clark	England	2024	2024	5	7	7	3.50	60	3	2/26	38.33	0	0
35	**Ben Dwarshuis**	Australia	2024	2024	2	60	40*	–	40	4	2/28	14.00	0	0
36	**Mitchell Santner**	New Zealand	2024	2025	11	52	24	17.33	175	10	3/24	24.00	6	0
37	Dillon Pennington	England	2024	2024	1	–	–	–	5	0	–	–	0	0
38	Tom Lawes	England	2024	2026	13	22	11*	5.50	165	8	2/22	34.50	5	0
39	Pat Brown	England	2024	2024	2	–	–	–	30	1	1/28	51.00	1	0
40	Zak Crawley ♠	England	2025	2026	18	449	67*	32.07	0	0	–	–	8	0
41	Dawid Malan	England	2025	2025	9	211	58	23.44	0	0	–	–	0	0
42	Dan Lawrence †	England	2025	2026	18	259	51*	23.55	70	0	–	–	3	0
43	**David Miller**	South Africa	2025	2025	7	133	38	33.25	0	0	–	–	2	0
44	**Imad Wasim**	Pakistan	2025	2025	2	–	–	–	40	5	3/19	9.00	1	0
45	**Mohammad Amir**	Pakistan	2025	2025	2	11	11*	–	40	1	1/28	52.00	0	0
46	**Jacob Duffy**	New Zealand	2025	2025	7	–	–	–	120	8	3/26	22.50	3	0
47	Samit Patel	England	2025	2025	3	48	42	48.00	34	0	–	–	0	0
48	**Mitchell Marsh**	Australia	2026	2026	9	416	76	46.22	0	0	–	–	1	0
49	**Ryan Rickelton** †	South Africa	2026	2026	9	345	94*	49.28	0	0	–	–	4	0
50	Tom Alsop	England	2026	2026	4	62	31	31.00	0	0	–	–	1	0
51	Benny Howell	England	2026	2026	1	0	0	0.00	10	0	–	–	1	0
52	**Nathan Ellis**	Australia	2026	2026	9	0	0	0.00	180	11	2/18	21.45	2	0
53	**Abrar Ahmed**	Pakistan	2026	2026	8	8	7*	–	125	4	2/33	52.75	1	0
54	Matt Revis	England	2026	2026	7	31	15*	10.33	70	2	1/26	76.50	6	0
55	Liam Patterson-White	England	2026	2026	3	27	17	27.00	30	0	–	–	1	0

== See also ==
- Northern Superchargers
- The Hundred
