= 2021 Northern Superchargers season =

Northern Superchargers
2021 season
- Logo used for the Northern Superchargers
- Coach: (Australia) Darren Lehmann (Men's team) (England) Danielle Hazell (Women's team)
- Captain: (South Africa) Faf du Plessis (Men's team) (England) Lauren Winfield-Hill (Women's team)
- Overseas player: (South Africa) Faf du Plessis (Australia) Chris Lynn (Afghanistan) Mujeeb Ur Rahman (South Africa) Dane Vilas (Men's team) (Australia) Laura Kimmince (India) Jemimah Rodrigues (South Africa) Laura Wolvaardt (Women's team)
- Ground(s): Headingley
- The Hundred (Men's): 5th
- The Hundred (Women's): 6th
- Most runs: Jemimah Rodrigues: 249 (Women's team); Harry Brook: 189 (Men's team)
- Most wickets: Adil Rashid: 12 (Men's team); Linsey Smith: 9 (Women's team)
- Most catches: Matty Potts: 5 (Men's team); Laura Wolvaardt: 5 (Women's team)

The 2021 season was the Northern Superchargers first season of the new franchise 100 ball cricket, The Hundred. While not being a successful season for either the men's or women's teams, the men's team did set the record for becoming the first team to score 200 runs in a game, scoring 200 on 12 August 2021 in their win against Manchester Originals.

== Players ==
=== Men's side ===
- **Bold** denotes players with international caps.

| S/N | Name | Nat. | Date of birth (age) | Batting style | Bowling style | Notes |
Batsmen
| 9 | **Adam Lyth** | (England) | 25 September 1987 (age 38) | Left-handed | Right-arm off break | |
| 32 | Tom Kohler-Cadmore | (England) | 19 August 1994 (age 31) | Right-handed | Right-arm off break | |
| 50 | **Chris Lynn** | (Australia) | 10 April 1990 (age 35) | Right-handed | Slow left-arm orthodox | Overseas player |
| 88 | Harry Brook | (England) | 22 February 1999 (age 27) | Right-handed | Right-arm medium | |
| — | **Faf du Plessis** | (South Africa) | 13 July 1984 (age 41) | Right-handed | Right-arm leg break | Captain; Overseas player |
All Rounders
| 15 | **David Willey** | (England) | 28 February 1990 (age 35) | Left-handed | Left-arm fast-medium | Local Icon player |
| 18 | Ben Raine | (England) | 14 September 1991 (age 34) | Left-handed | Right-arm fast-medium | Wildcard pick |
| 44 | Jordan Thompson | (England) | 9 October 1996 (age 29) | Left-handed | Right-arm fast-medium | |
| 55 | **Ben Stokes** | (England) | 4 June 1991 (age 34) | Left-handed | Right-arm fast-medium | Centrally Contracted player |
Wicketkeepers
| 20 | **John Simpson** | (England) | 13 July 1988 (age 37) | Left-handed | — | |
| 33 | **Dane Vilas** | (South Africa) | 10 June 1985 (age 40) | Right-handed | — | Replacement player; Overseas player |
Pace bowlers
| 35 | Matty Potts | (England) | 29 October 1998 (age 27) | Right-handed | Right-arm fast-medium | |
| 99 | **Brydon Carse** | (England) | 31 July 1995 (age 30) | Right-handed | Right-arm fast-medium | |
| — | Matthew Fisher | (England) | 9 November 1997 (age 28) | Right-handed | Right-arm fast-medium | |
Spin bowlers
| 7 | **Mujeeb Ur Rahman** | (Afghanistan) | 28 March 2001 (age 24) | Right-handed | Right-arm off break | Overseas player |
| 10 | Callum Parkinson | (England) | 24 October 1996 (age 29) | Right-handed | Slow left-arm orthodox | |
| 95 | **Adil Rashid** | (England) | 17 February 1988 (age 38) | Right-handed | Right-arm leg break | Local Icon player |

=== Women's side ===
- **Bold** denotes players with international caps.

| S/N | Name | Nat. | Date of birth (age) | Batting style | Bowling style | Notes |
Batters
| 4 | Laura Kimmince | (Australia) | 18 August 1990 (age 35) | Right-handed | — | Overseas player |
| 5 | **Jemimah Rodrigues** | (India) | 5 September 2000 (age 25) | Right-handed | Right-arm off break | Overseas player |
| 14 | **Laura Wolvaardt** | (South Africa) | 26 April 1999 (age 26) | Right-handed | — | Overseas player |
| 57 | Hollie Armitage | (England) | 14 June 1997 (age 28) | Right-handed | Right-arm leg break | |
| 58 | **Lauren Winfield-Hill** | (England) | 16 August 1990 (age 35) | Right-handed | — | Captain; Centrally Contracted player |
| — | Ami Campbell | (England) | 6 June 1991 (age 34) | Left-handed | Right-arm medium | |
All Rounders
| 9 | Kalea Moore | (England) | 27 March 2003 (age 22) | Right-handed | Right-arm off break | |
| 17 | Phoebe Graham | (England) | 23 October 1991 (age 34) | Right-handed | Right-arm medium | |
| 22 | **Sterre Kalis** | (Netherlands) | 30 August 1999 (age 26) | Right-handed | Right-arm medium | |
| 24 | **Alice Davidson-Richards** | (England) | 29 May 1994 (age 31) | Right-handed | Right-arm fast-medium | |
Wicketkeepers
| 10 | Bess Heath | (England) | 20 August 2001 (age 24) | Right-handed | — | |
Pace bowlers
| 42 | **Beth Langston** | (England) | 6 September 1992 (age 33) | Right-handed | Right-arm medium | |
| 45 | Elizabeth Russell | (England) | 22 May 1994 (age 31) | Left-handed | Right-arm medium | Replacement player |
| 72 | Rachel Slater | (England) | 20 November 2001 (age 24) | Right-handed | Right-arm medium | Replacement player |
Spin bowlers
| 23 | Katie Levick | (England) | 17 July 1991 (age 34) | Right-handed | Right-arm leg break | |
| 59 | **Linsey Smith** | (England) | 10 March 1995 (age 30) | Left-handed | Slow left-arm orthodox | |
| — | Helen Fenby | (England) | 23 November 1998 (age 27) | Right-handed | Right-arm leg break | |

== Regular season ==
=== Fixtures (Men) ===
==== July ====
24 July 2021
18:00 (N)
Scorecard

| Welsh Fire; 173/4 (100 balls) | v | Northern Superchargers; 168/7 (100 balls) |
| Jonny Bairstow 56 (36); Ben Stokes 1/8 (10 balls) | | Harry Brook 62 (31); Qais Ahmad 4/13 (20 balls) |

Welsh Fire won by 5 runs
Headingley, Leeds
Attendance: 10,324
Umpires: Nigel Llong and Neil Mallender
Player of the match: Qais Ahmad (Welsh Fire)

- Northern Superchargers won the toss and elected to field.
- Points: Welsh Fire 2, Northern Superchargers 0.

26 July 2021
18:30 (N)
Scorecard

| Northern Superchargers; 132 (99 balls) | v | Trent Rockets; 134/8 (94 balls) |
| John Simpson 42 (33); Marchant de Lange 3/22 (14 balls) | | Alex Hales 40* (34); Callum Parkinson 2/19 (15 balls) |

Trent Rockets won by 2 wickets
Trent Bridge, Nottingham
Attendance: 11,483
Umpires: Tim Robinson and Russell Warren
Player of the match: Rashid Khan (Trent Rockets)

- Northern Superchargers won the toss and elected to bat.
- Points: Trent Rockets 2, Northern Superchargers 0.

28 July 2021
18:30 (N)
Scorecard

| Manchester Originals | v | Northern Superchargers |

Match abandoned
Old Trafford, Manchester
Umpires: Peter Hartley and Graham Lloyd

- No toss.
- No play was possible due to rain.
- Points: Manchester Originals 1, Northern Superchargers 1.

31 July 2021
18:00 (N)
Scorecard

| Oval Invincibles; 127/6 (100 balls) | v | Northern Superchargers; 128/4 (97 balls) |
| Jason Roy 52* (43); Adil Rashid 3/13 (20 balls) | | Chris Lynn 48 (48); Saqib Mahmood 2/19 (20 balls) |

Northern Superchargers won by 6 wickets
Headingley, Leeds
Attendance: 10,859
Umpires: Nick Cook and Alex Wharf
Player of the match: Harry Brook (Northern Superchargers)

- Oval Invincibles won the toss and elected to bat.
- Points: Northern Superchargers 2, Oval Invincibles 0.

==== August ====
3 August 2021
18:30 (N)
Scorecard

| Northern Superchargers; 155/3 (100 balls) | v | London Spirit; 92/9 (100 balls) |
| David Willey 81* (45); Mohammad Nabi 1/19 (15 balls) | | Eoin Morgan 27 (22); Ben Raine 3/20 (20 balls) |

Northern Superchargers won by 63 runs
Lord's, London
Umpires: Nigel Llong and Steve O'Shaughnessy
Player of the match: David Willey (Northern Superchargers)

- Northern Superchargers won the toss and elected to bat.
- Points: Northern Superchargers 2, London Spirit 0.

7 August 2021
19:00 (N)
Scorecard

| Northern Superchargers; 128/6 (100 balls) | v | Southern Brave; 131/5 (95 balls) |
| Dane Vilas 35* (24); Danny Briggs 2/28 (20 balls) | | Quinton de Kock 72* (45); Adil Rashid 2/19 (20 balls) |

Southern Brave won by 5 wickets
Rose Bowl, Southampton
Umpires: Graham Lloyd and Tim Robinson
Player of the match: Quinton de Kock (Southern Brave)

- Northern Superchargers won the toss and elected to bat.
- Points: Southern Brave 2, Northern Superchargers 0.

12 August 2021
19:00 (N)
Scorecard

| Northern Superchargers; 200/5 (100 balls) | v | Manchester Originals; 131 (99 balls) |
| John Simpson 71* (28); Lockie Ferguson 2/37 (20 balls) | | Carlos Brathwaite 21 (14); Ben Raine 3/15 (14 balls) |

Northern Superchargers won by 69 runs
Headingley, Leeds
Umpires: Rob Bailey and Martin Saggers
Player of the match: John Simpson (Northern Superchargers)

- Manchester Originals won the toss and elected to field.
- Points: Northern Superchargers 2, Manchester Originals 0.

17 August 2021
18:30 (N)
Scorecard

| Northern Superchargers; 143/8 (100 balls) | v | Birmingham Phoenix; 147/2 (74 balls) |
| Tom Kohler-Cadmore 71 (44); Liam Livingstone 3/25 (20 balls) | | Liam Livingstone 92* (40); David Willey 1/26 (10 balls) |

Birmingham Phoenix won by 8 wickets
Headingley, Leeds
Umpires: Neil Mallender and Russell Warren
Player of the match: Liam Livingstone (Birmingham Phoenix)

- Birmingham Phoenix won the toss and elected to field.
- Points: Birmingham Phoenix 2, Northern Superchargers 0.

=== Fixtures (Women) ===
==== July ====
24 July 2021
14:30
Scorecard

| Welsh Fire; 130/8 (100 balls) | v | Northern Superchargers; 131/4 (85 balls) |
| Hayley Matthews 30 (20); Linsey Smith 3/14 (20 balls) | | Jemimah Rodrigues 92* (43); Piepa Cleary 1/14 (15 balls) |

Northern Superchargers won by 6 wickets
Headingley, Leeds
Umpires: Anna Harris and Steve O'Shaughnessy
Player of the match: Jemimah Rodrigues (Northern Superchargers)

- Northern Superchargers won the toss and elected to field.
- Points: Northern Superchargers 2, Welsh Fire 0.

26 July 2021
15:00
Scorecard

| Northern Superchargers; 149/7 (100 balls) | v | Trent Rockets; 122/7 (100 balls) |
| Jemimah Rodrigues 60 (41); Sammy-Jo Johnson 4/15 (20 balls) | | Katherine Brunt 43* (36); Katie Levick 2/20 (20 balls) |

Northern Superchargers won by 27 runs
Trent Bridge, Nottingham
Umpires: David Millns and Sue Redfern
Player of the match: Jemimah Rodrigues (Northern Superchargers)

- Northern Superchargers won the toss and elected to bat.
- Points: Northern Superchargers 2, Trent Rockets 0.

28 July 2021
15:00
Scorecard

| Manchester Originals | v | Northern Superchargers |

Match abandoned
Old Trafford, Manchester
Umpires: Anna Harris and David Millns

- No toss.
- No play was possible due to rain.
- Points: Manchester Originals 1, Northern Superchargers 1.

31 July 2021
14:30
Scorecard

| Northern Superchargers; 109/8 (100 balls) | v | Oval Invincibles; 105/4 (100 balls) |
| Alice Davidson-Richards 42 (30); Alice Capsey 2/9 (20 balls) | | Sarah Bryce 29 (33); Alice Davidson-Richards 2/17 (20 balls) |

Northern Superchargers won by 4 runs
Headingley, Leeds
Umpires: Anna Harris and Steve O'Shaughnessy
Player of the match: Alice Davidson-Richards (Northern Superchargers)

- Oval Invincibles won the toss and elected to field.
- Points: Northern Superchargers 2, Oval Invincibles 0.

==== August ====
3 August 2021
15:00
Scorecard

| Northern Superchargers; 126/5 (100 balls) | v | London Spirit; 129/3 (98 balls) |
| Jemimah Rodrigues 57 (44); Sophie Munro 2/20 (15 balls) | | Deandra Dottin 50* (34); Linsey Smith 2/15 (20 balls) |

London Spirit won by 7 wickets
Lord's, London
Umpires: Rob Bailey and Anna Harris
Player of the match: Deandra Dottin (London Spirit)

- Northern Superchargers won the toss and elected to bat.
- Points: London Spirit 2, Northern Superchargers 0.

7 August 2021
15:30
Scorecard

| Northern Superchargers; 76/3 (73 balls) | v | Southern Brave; 89/3 (62 balls) |
| Laura Wolvaardt 21* (22); Lauren Bell 2/19 (15 balls) | | Sophia Dunkley 50* (28); Kalea Moore 2/9 (15 balls) |

Southern Brave won by 7 wickets (DLS Method)
Rose Bowl, Southampton
Umpires: Nick Cook and Anna Harris
Player of the match: Sophia Dunkley (Southern Brave)

- Southern Brave won the toss and elected to field.
- Rain stopped play during Northern Superchargers innings. Southern Brave were set a revised target of 89 runs from 75 balls.
- Points: Southern Brave 2, Northern Superchargers 0.

12 August 2021
15:30
Scorecard

| Northern Superchargers; 126/5 (100 balls) | v | Manchester Originals; 127/2 (86 balls) |
| Laura Wolvaardt 75* (51); Kate Cross 3/19 (20 balls) | | Lizelle Lee 68 (40); Kalea Moore 1/20 (15 balls) |

Manchester Originals won by 8 wickets
Headingley, Leeds
Umpires: Nigel Llong and Sue Redfern
Player of the match: Kate Cross (Manchester Originals)

- Manchester Originals won the toss and elected to field.
- Points: Manchester Originals 2, Northern Superchargers 0.

17 August 2021
15:00
Scorecard

| Birmingham Phoenix; 147/4 (100 balls) | v | Northern Superchargers; 133/6 (100 balls) |
| Evelyn Jones 64 (47); Katie Levick 2/23 (20 balls) | | Lauren Winfield-Hill 64 (38); Issy Wong 2/23 (20 balls) |

Birmingham Phoenix won by 14 runs
Headingley, Leeds
Umpires: Anna Harris and Steve O'Shaughnessy
Player of the match: Evelyn Jones (Birmingham Phoenix)

- Northern Superchargers won the toss and elected to field.
- Points: Birmingham Phoenix 2, Northern Superchargers 0.

== Standings ==
=== Women ===
| Pos | Team | Pld | W | L | T | NR | Pts | NRR |
|---|---|---|---|---|---|---|---|---|
| 1 | Southern Brave | 8 | 7 | 1 | 0 | 0 | 14 | 1.056 |
| 2 | Oval Invincibles | 8 | 4 | 3 | 0 | 1 | 9 | 0.015 |
| 3 | Birmingham Phoenix | 8 | 4 | 4 | 0 | 0 | 8 | 0.186 |
| 4 | London Spirit | 8 | 4 | 4 | 0 | 0 | 8 | 0.046 |
| 5 | Manchester Originals | 8 | 3 | 4 | 0 | 1 | 7 | 0.016 |
| 6 | Northern Superchargers | 8 | 3 | 4 | 0 | 1 | 7 | −0.041 |
| 7 | Trent Rockets | 8 | 3 | 4 | 0 | 1 | 7 | −0.293 |
| 8 | Welsh Fire | 8 | 2 | 6 | 0 | 0 | 4 | −1.017 |

Source: ESPN Cricinfo, Sky Sports

advances to the Final
advances to the Eliminator

=== Men ===
| Pos | Team | Pld | W | L | T | NR | Pts | NRR |
|---|---|---|---|---|---|---|---|---|
| 1 | Birmingham Phoenix | 8 | 6 | 2 | 0 | 0 | 12 | 1.087 |
| 2 | Southern Brave | 8 | 5 | 2 | 0 | 1 | 11 | 0.034 |
| 3 | Trent Rockets | 8 | 5 | 3 | 0 | 0 | 10 | 0.035 |
| 4 | Oval Invincibles | 8 | 4 | 3 | 0 | 1 | 9 | 0.123 |
| 5 | Northern Superchargers | 8 | 3 | 4 | 0 | 1 | 7 | 0.510 |
| 6 | Manchester Originals | 8 | 2 | 4 | 0 | 2 | 6 | −0.361 |
| 7 | Welsh Fire | 8 | 3 | 5 | 0 | 0 | 6 | −0.827 |
| 8 | London Spirit | 8 | 1 | 6 | 0 | 1 | 3 | −0.641 |

Source: ESPN Cricinfo, Sky Sports

advances to the Final
advances to the Eliminator
