= 2024 Northern Superchargers season =

Northern Superchargers
2024 season
- Coach: Danielle Hazell (women); Andrew Flintoff (men)
- Captain: Hollie Armitage (women); Harry Brook (men)
- Overseas player: Phoebe Litchfield; Annabel Sutherland; Georgia Wareham; (women); Nicholas Pooran; Daniel Sams; Matthew Short; (men)
- Ground(s): Headingley

The 2024 season was the Northern Superchargers second season of the 100 ball franchise cricket, The Hundred.

== Players ==
- **Bold** denotes players with international caps.

=== Women's side ===
S/N	Name	Nat.	Date of birth (age)	Batting style	Bowling style	Notes
Batters
18	**Phoebe Litchfield**	Australia	18 April 2003 (age 22)	Left-handed	Right-arm leg break	Overseas player
23	Marie Kelly	England	9 February 1996 (age 29)	Right-handed	Right-arm medium	
57	**Hollie Armitage**	England	14 June 1997 (age 28)	Right-handed	Right-arm leg break	Captain
—	Davina Perrin	England	8 September 2006 (age 19)	Right-handed	Right-arm leg break	
All-rounders
24	**Alice Davidson-Richards**	England	29 May 1994 (age 31)	Right-handed	Right-arm medium	
—	Jodi Grewcock	England	30 November 2004 (age 21)	Left-handed	Right-arm leg break	Wildcard player
—	**Annabel Sutherland**	Australia	12 October 2001 (age 24)	Right-handed	Right-arm medium	Overseas player
Wicket-keepers
25	**Bess Heath**	England	20 August 2001 (age 24)	Right-handed	—	
—	Ella Claridge	England	28 September 2002 (age 23)	Right-handed	Right-arm medium	
Pace bowlers
3	Grace Ballinger	England	3 April 2002 (age 23)	Left-handed	Left-arm medium	
16	**Kate Cross**	England	3 October 1991 (age 34)	Right-handed	Right-arm medium	
—	Sophia Turner	England	23 April 2003 (age 22)	Right-handed	Right-arm medium	Wildcard player
Spin bowlers
7	Lucy Higham	England	17 October 1997 (age 28)	Right-handed	Right-arm off break	
32	**Georgia Wareham**	Australia	26 May 1999 (age 26)	Right-handed	Right-arm leg break	Overseas player
50	**Linsey Smith**	England	10 March 1995 (age 30)	Left-handed	Slow left-arm orthodox	

=== Men's side ===
S/N	Name	Nat.	Date of birth (age)	Batting style	Bowling style	Notes
Batters
2	**Matthew Short**	Australia	8 November 1995 (age 30)	Right-handed	Right-arm off break	Overseas player
21	Adam Hose	England	25 October 1992 (age 33)	Right-handed	Right-arm medium	
88	**Harry Brook**	England	22 February 1999 (age 26)	Right-handed	Right-arm medium	Captain
—	Graham Clark	England	16 March 1993 (age 32)	Right-handed	Right-arm leg break	
—	**Jason Roy**	England	21 July 1990 (age 35)	Right-handed	Right-arm medium	Replacement player
All-rounders
55	**Ben Stokes**	England	4 June 1991 (age 34)	Left-handed	Right-arm fast-medium	Centrally contracted player
—	Jordan Clark	England	14 October 1990 (age 35)	Right-handed	Right-arm fast-medium	Wildcard player
—	Tom Lawes	England	25 December 2002 (age 22)	Right-handed	Right-arm fast-medium	
—	**Daniel Sams**	Australia	27 October 1992 (age 33)	Right-handed	Left-arm fast-medium	Overseas player
Wicket-keepers
45	Ollie Robinson	England	1 December 1998 (age 27)	Right-handed	—	
—	**Nicholas Pooran**	West Indies	2 October 1995 (age 30)	Left-handed	Right-arm off break	Overseas player
Pace bowlers
23	**Reece Topley**	England	21 February 1994 (age 31)	Right-handed	Left-arm fast-medium	
35	**Matthew Potts**	England	29 October 1998 (age 27)	Right-handed	Right-arm fast-medium	
99	**Brydon Carse**	England	31 July 1995 (age 30)	Right-handed	Right-arm fast-medium	Ruled out
—	Dillon Pennington	England	26 February 1999 (age 26)	Right-handed	Right-arm fast-medium	Wildcard player
Spin bowlers
10	Callum Parkinson	England	24 October 1996 (age 29)	Right-handed	Slow left-arm orthodox	
95	**Adil Rashid**	England	17 February 1988 (age 37)	Right-handed	Right-arm leg break	

== Standings ==
=== Women ===
Pos	Team	Pld	W	L	T	NR	Pts	NRR	Qualification
1	Welsh Fire	8	5	2	0	1	11	0.334	Advanced to the Final
2	Oval Invincibles	8	5	2	1	0	11	0.034	Advanced to the Eliminator
3	London Spirit	8	4	3	1	0	9	0.080	Advanced to the Eliminator
4	Northern Superchargers	8	3	3	1	1	8	0.942	
5	Trent Rockets	8	4	4	0	0	8	0.407	
6	Manchester Originals	8	3	4	0	1	7	−0.398	
7	Birmingham Phoenix	8	3	4	0	1	7	−0.742	
8	Southern Brave	8	1	6	1	0	3	−0.675	

Source: ESPNcricinfo

=== Men ===
Pos	Team	Pld	W	L	T	NR	Pts	NRR	Qualification
1	Oval Invincibles	8	6	2	0	0	12	0.893	Advanced to the Final
2	Birmingham Phoenix	8	6	2	0	0	12	0.402	Advanced to the Eliminator
3	Southern Brave	8	5	2	0	1	11	0.595	Advanced to the Eliminator
4	Northern Superchargers	8	5	2	0	1	11	−0.453	
5	Trent Rockets	8	4	4	0	0	8	0.348	
6	Welsh Fire	8	2	4	0	2	6	−0.215	
7	Manchester Originals	8	1	7	0	0	2	−0.886	
8	London Spirit	8	1	7	0	0	2	−0.975	

Source: ESPN Cricinfo
