= English cricket team in Ireland in 2015 =

England cricket team in Ireland in 2015
	England	Ireland
- Date: 8 May 2015
Captains	James Taylor	William Porterfield

One Day International series
- Results: 1-match series drawn 0–0
Most runs	None	Ed Joyce (23)
Most wickets	Tim Bresnan (1); David Willey (1); Mark Wood (1)	None

The England cricket team visited Ireland on 8 May 2015 for a single One Day International (ODI). In February 2015, the England and Wales Cricket Board (ECB) confirmed that the current England ODI captain, Eoin Morgan, was allowed to miss the match due to prior commitments with the Indian Premier League. On 28 April, James Taylor would take Morgan's place for the first time. England initially named 11 players in their squad for the match, but called up Adil Rashid and Mark Wood from the Test squad after they missed out on selection for the 3rd Test against the West Indies.

The match was abandoned with no result after 18 overs of the Ireland innings.

== Squads ==
On 4 May, Ireland bowler Tim Murtagh was ruled out of the match after tearing a hamstring in Middlesex's County Championship match against Durham.

Ireland	England
William Porterfield (c); Andy Balbirnie; Alex Cusack; George Dockrell; Ed Joyce; Andrew McBrine; John Mooney; Tim Murtagh; Kevin O'Brien; Niall O'Brien (wk); Paul Stirling; Stuart Thompson; Gary Wilson (wk); Craig Young	James Taylor (c); Zafar Ansari; Jonny Bairstow (wk); Sam Billings (wk); Tim Bresnan; Steven Finn; Lewis Gregory; Alex Hales; Adil Rashid; Jason Roy; James Vince; Mark Wood; David Willey

== ODI series ==
=== Only ODI ===
8 May 2015
Scorecard

Ireland; 56/4 (18 overs)	v	England
Ed Joyce 23* (42); Tim Bresnan 1/11 (6 overs)

No result
The Village, Dublin
Umpires: Mark Hawthorne (Ire) and Ian Ramage (Sco)

- England won the toss and elected to field.
- Rain stopped play after 18 overs of the Ireland innings and the match was eventually abandoned
- Zafar Ansari, Jason Roy, James Vince, David Willey and Mark Wood (all Eng) made their ODI debuts.
