= Craig Miles =

English cricketer (born 1994)

Personal information
- Full name: Craig Neil Miles
- Born: 20 July 1994 (age 32); Swindon, Wiltshire, England
- Batting: Right-handed
- Bowling: Right arm medium

Domestic team information
- Years: Team
- 2011–2018: Gloucestershire (squad no. 34)
- 2019–2025: Warwickshire (squad no. 18)
- 2022: Northern Superchargers
- 2023: → Durham (on loan)
- 2024: → Glamorgan (on loan)
- 2025: → Gloucestershire (on loan)
- 2026: Gloucestershire (squad no. 34)
- First-class debut: 11 May 2011 Gloucestershire v Northamptonshire
- List A debut: 26 July 2011 Gloucestershire v Essex

Career statistics
Competition	FC	LA	T20
Matches	111	57	71
Runs scored	1,901	192	89
Batting average	15.20	13.71	5.93
100s/50s	0/5	0/0	0/0
Top score	62*	31*	11*
Balls bowled	17,051	2,424	1,251
Wickets	368	66	78
Bowling average	28.58	38.78	23.50
5 wickets in innings	18	0	0
10 wickets in match	1	0	0
Best bowling	6/63	4/29	4/29
Catches/stumpings	35/–	14/–	38/–
- Source: ESPNcricinfo, 2 October 2026

Craig Neil Miles (born 20 July 1994) is an English former cricketer. A right-handed batsman and right-hand medium pace bowler he made his first-class debut for Gloucestershire against Northamptonshire in May 2011. In doing so, at 16, he became the fourth youngest player to represent Gloucestershire in a first-class match. Miles signed a three-year contract for Gloucestershire in November 2010, but did not become a full-time professional player until 2013. He was born at Swindon in Wiltshire and studied at South Gloucestershire and Stroud College.

== County career ==
Miles made his first-class debut for Gloucestershire in May 2011 against Northamptonshire as a 16-year-old. In the first innings Miles bowled 19 overs for 80 runs also gaining two wickets. His debut first-class victim was Alex Wakely who was caught by Chris Taylor for 32. He made 19 runs in the Gloucestershire innings from 66 including 2 fours, whilst in the second innings he scored 5 in a heavy innings and 6 runs defeat. Miles made his List A debut against Essex in July 2011. He bowled 7 overs with figures of 2 wickets for 32 runs as Gloucestershire won by 4 wickets. Miles also played in the following game against Lancashire, however bowled just 4 overs and went for 31 runs.

Miles joined Warwickshire in September 2018 and signed a contract extension in October 2022 to remain at the club until the end of the 2025 season. In July 2025, it was announced he had agreed to rejoin Gloucestershire from 1 November that year.

On 30 September 2026, Miles announced his retirement from professional cricket, writing in an open letter published on Gloucestershire's website that his decision was intended to "prioritise my mental well-being."
