= Ben Raine =

English cricketer (born 1991)

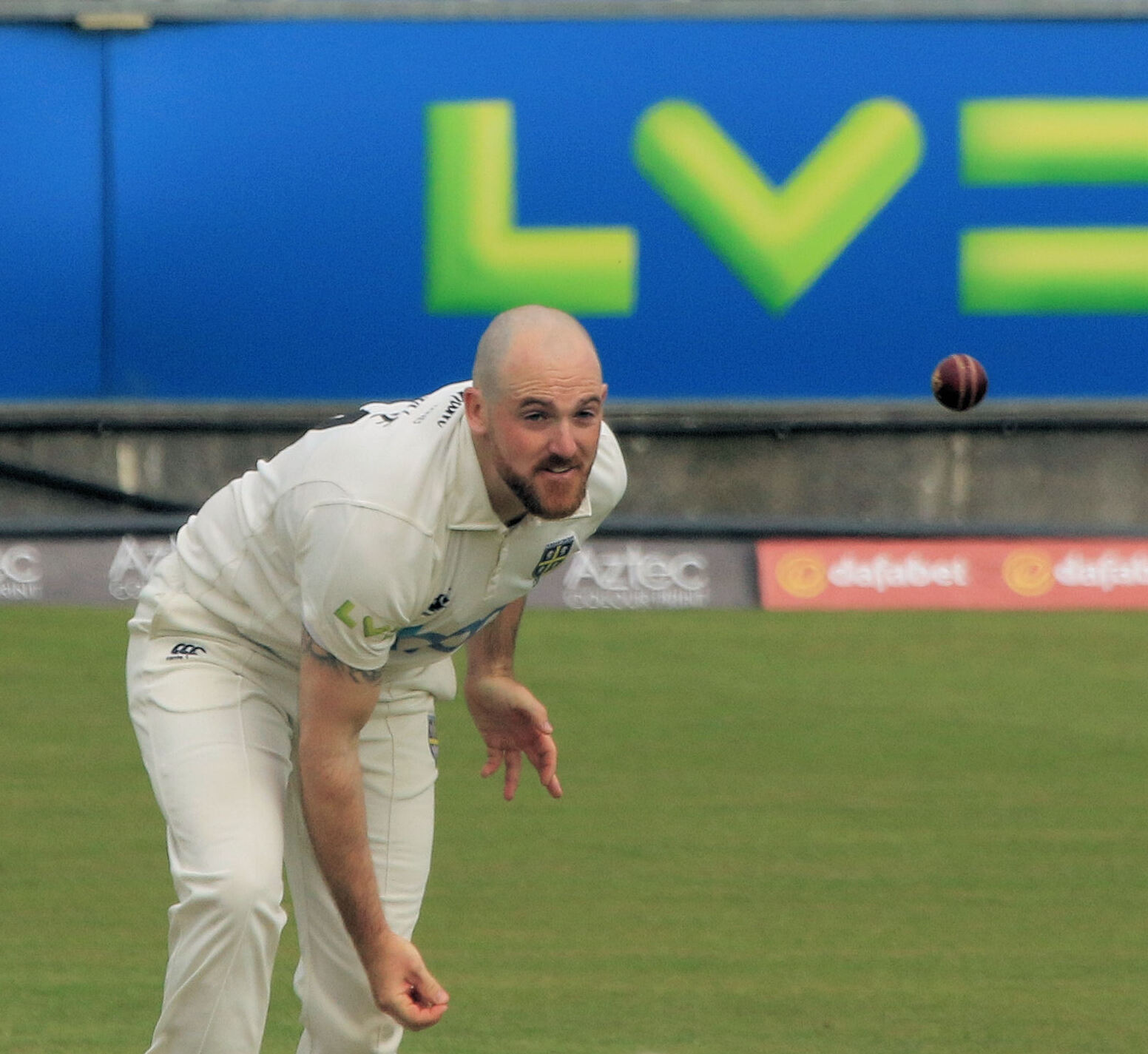
- Raine in 2023

Personal information
- Full name: Benjamin Alexander Raine
- Born: 14 September 1991 (age 35); Sunderland, Tyne and Wear, England
- Batting: Left-handed
- Bowling: Right-arm medium-fast
- Role: Bowling All-rounder

Domestic team information
- Years: Team
- 2010–2013: Northumberland
- 2011: Durham
- 2013–2018: Leicestershire (squad no. 44)
- 2018/19: Otago
- 2019–present: Durham
- 2021–2022: Northern Superchargers
- 2023: Manchester Originals
- FC debut: 27 July 2011 Durham v Sri Lanka A
- LA debut: 22 May 2011 Durham v Warwickshire

Career statistics
Competition	FC	LA	T20
Matches	158	37	157
Runs scored	4,815	504	1,532
Batting average	24.19	21.00	16.83
100s/50s	3/22	0/1	1/4
Top score	106	83	113
Balls bowled	29,428	1,735	2,730
Wickets	552	45	166
Bowling average	25.58	36.02	22.51
5 wickets in innings	19	0	2
10 wickets in match	0	0	0
Best bowling	6/27	4/30	5/21
Catches/stumpings	36/–	10/–	29/–
- Source: ESPNcricinfo, 27 September 2026

Benjamin Alexander Raine (born 14 September 1991) is an English cricketer. Raine is a left-handed batsman who bowls right-arm medium-fast, playing for Durham. He was born in Sunderland, Tyne and Wear.

Raine made a single appearance for Northumberland against Shropshire in the 2010 MCCA Knockout Trophy. In 2011, Raine made his debut for Durham in a List A match in the Clydesdale Bank 40 against Warwickshire. Later in the 2011 season, Raine made his first-class debut against Sri Lanka A. In this match, he was dismissed in Durham's first-innings for 4 runs by Shaminda Eranga, while in their second-innings he was dismissed for 7 runs by Sachithra Senanayake.

In June 2022, in the 2022 County Championship, Raine scored his maiden century in first-class cricket, scoring 103 not out against Worcestershire.

Raine signed a new three-year contract with Durham in February 2025. He agreed a further one-year contract extension in July 2026, tying him into the club until at least the end of the 2028 season.
