= Adam Lyth =

English cricketer

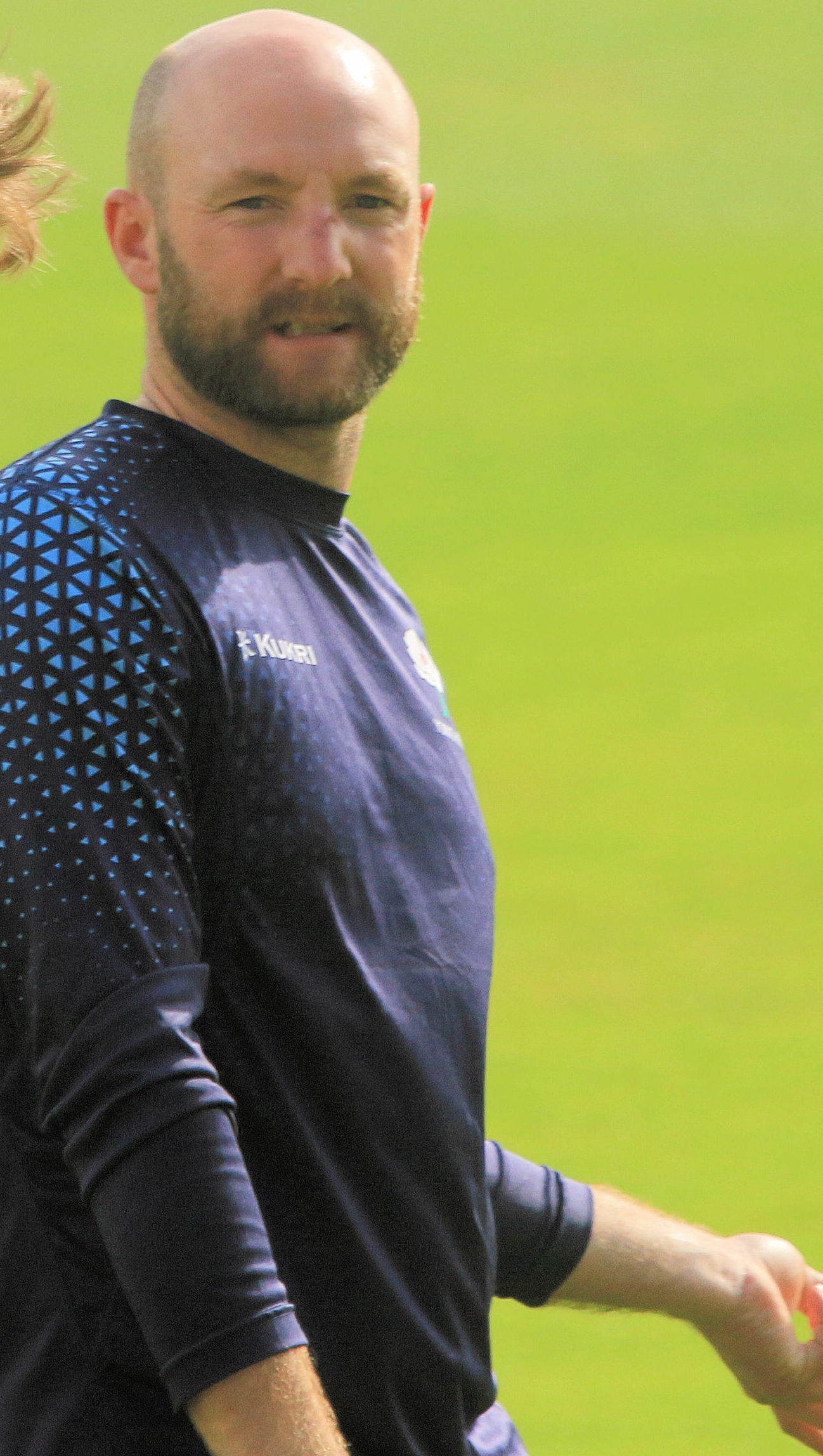
- Lyth in 2022

Personal information
- Born: 25 September 1987 (age 39); Whitby, North Yorkshire, England
- Nickname: 5 A'Lyth, Peanut
- Height: 5 ft 9 in (1.75 m)
- Batting: Left-handed
- Bowling: Right-arm off break
- Role: Batter

International information
- National side: England
- Test debut (cap 666): 21 May 2015 v New Zealand
- Last Test: 20 August 2015 v Australia

Domestic team information
- Years: Team
- 2006–present: Yorkshire (squad no. 9)
- 2017: Rangpur Riders
- 2020: Multan Sultans
- 2021–23: Northern Superchargers
- 2022–23: Perth Scorchers
- 2024: Trent Rockets
- 2025: Gulf Giants

Career statistics
Competition	Test	FC	LA	T20
Matches	7	264	140	231
Runs scored	265	16,519	4,045	5,452
Batting average	20.38	39.05	32.36	25.47
100s/50s	1/0	41/84	5/18	2/35
Top score	107	251	144	161
Balls bowled	6	3,887	589	553
Wickets	0	53	11	26
Bowling average	–	40.92	49.81	27.34
5 wickets in innings	–	0	0	1
10 wickets in match	–	0	0	0
Best bowling	–	4/56	2/11	5/31
Catches/stumpings	8/–	345/–	67/–	110/–
- Source: ESPNcricinfo, 26 September 2026

Adam Lyth (born 25 September 1987) is a cricket left-handed opening batter who has played seven Test matches for England in 2015. He has played for Yorkshire since 2006.

== Career ==
=== Domestic career ===
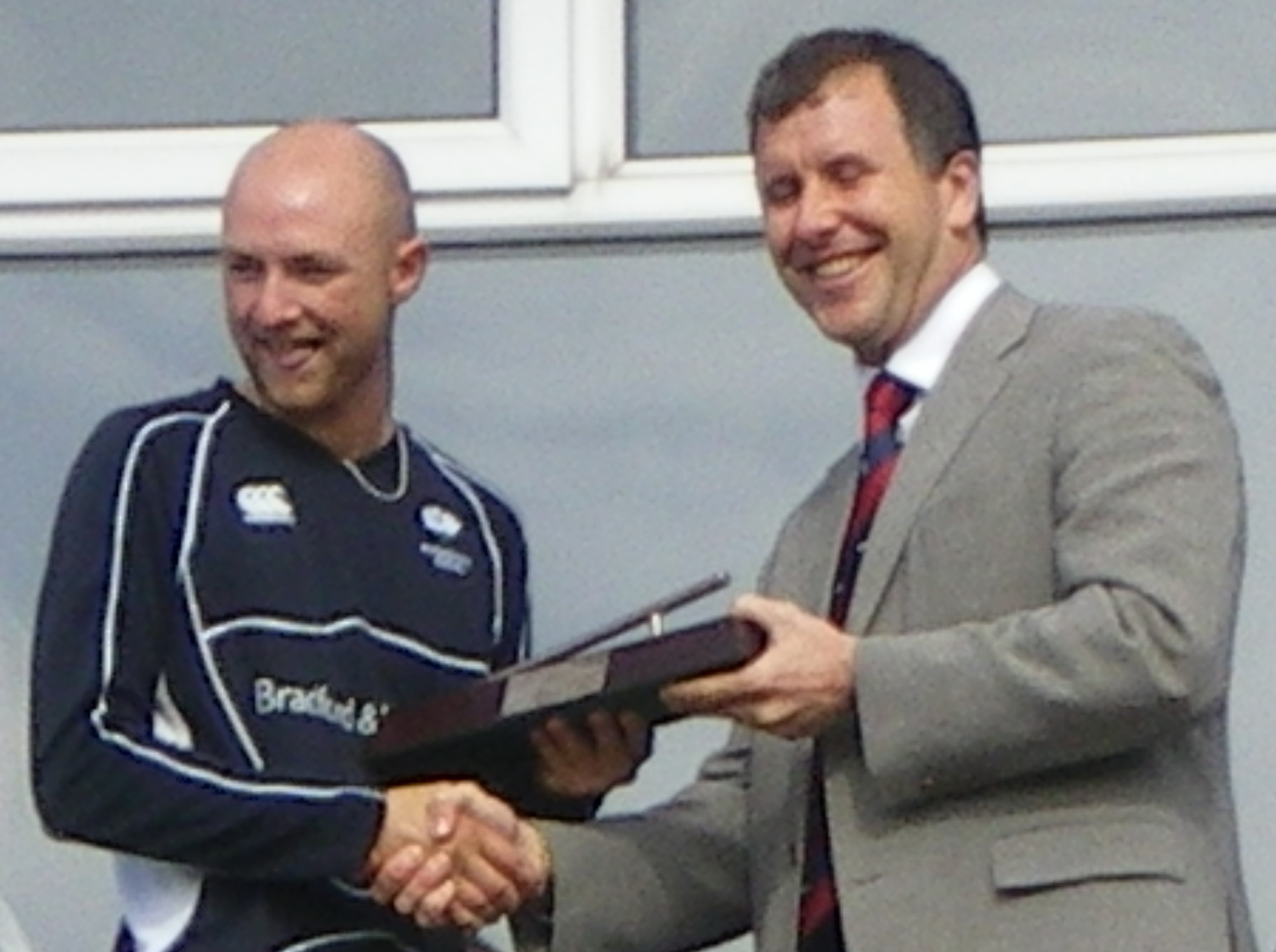
Adam Lyth collecting the 2008 Yorkshire County Cricket Club Young Player of the Year award from Stewart Regan.

Born 25 September 1987, Whitby, North Yorkshire, Lyth made his first-team debut for Yorkshire in a Pro40 match in 2006, and his first-class debut in May 2007, against Loughborough UCCE. He played for the England under-19 team in five Youth 'Tests' and 13 Youth 'ODIs' between 2006 and 2007.

In the 2008 season, Lyth scored 645 runs in the County Championship, won the Yorkshire County Cricket Club Young Player of the Year award, and signed a three-year contract with Yorkshire at the end of the season.

On 24 August 2010, Lyth was awarded his county cap on his home ground at North Marine Road Ground, Scarborough, before the start of Yorkshire's County Championship match against Hampshire.

At the County Championship match against Leicestershire at Grace Road in July 2012, Lyth created a county record, by becoming the first Yorkshire batsman to score over 200 runs, whilst carrying his bat through an entire innings. He also totalled a first-class career best of 248 not out. In 2014 Lyth enjoyed his finest year, scoring 1489 Championship runs, including six centuries, at an average of 67.68.

On 17 August 2017, Lyth scored the highest ever individual score in the T20 Blast. He scored 161 from 73 deliveries, which consisted of 20 fours and 7 sixes, against Northamptonshire. He built an opening partnership of 127 runs with Tom Kohler-Cadmore. Yorkshire won by 124 runs.

Lyth has also become an increasingly useful bowler in the T20 format and took a career best 5 for 31 against Nottinghamshire Outlaws in the 2019 T20 Blast and in the process recorded the best ever T20 bowling figures at Trent Bridge.

In the 2020 PSL Playoffs, Adam Lyth was named replacement for the West Indian player Fabian Allen. He was signed by Northern Superchargers for The Hundred 2021 tournament. In April 2022, he was bought by the Northern Superchargers for the 2022 season of The Hundred.

Lyth signed a new contract with Yorkshire in February 2025, keeping him at the club until the end of the 2026 season.

=== International career ===
In March 2015, Lyth was named in the England Test squad for the tour of the West Indies, but did not play in the series, with Jonathan Trott being preferred instead.

Lyth made his Test debut for England against New Zealand in May 2015 and scored his first Test run off the first ball of the game. He failed to make a significant score in either innings, being dismissed for just seven in the first innings and then losing his wicket while on 12 in the second. Despite this, England went on to win the game by 124 runs to go 1–0 up in the series. In the second Test, Lyth top scored for England with 107, helping them to post 350. However, he could not follow this up in the second innings, being dismissed for 24 as England lost the game by 199 runs to draw the series 1–1.

Lyth was selected as England's opener for the 2015 Ashes series. Lyth was subsequently dropped from the Test side after the Ashes series after gaining a total of 111 runs from 9 innings.

== Outside cricket ==
Lyth had football trials as a youngster, with Manchester City.

Lyth played football at semi professional level for Whitby Town in the Northern Premier League. His only appearance was coming on as a substitute against Runcorn in 2006 in a 4–0 victory.
