= Kalea Moore =

English cricketer (born 2003)

Personal information
- Full name: Kalea Moore
- Born: 27 March 2003 (age 23); Greenwich, Greater London, England
- Batting: Right-handed
- Bowling: Right-arm off break
- Role: All-rounder

Domestic team information
- Years: Team
- 2019–2024: Kent
- 2021–2024: South East Stars
- 2021–2022: Northern Superchargers
- 2023–2024: Southern Brave
- 2025–present: Surrey
- 2025–present: Oval Invincibles

Career statistics
Competition	WLA	WT20
Matches	27	64
Runs scored	289	324
Batting average	17.00	16.20
100s/50s	0/1	0/1
Top score	52*	57*
Balls bowled	894	968
Wickets	25	51
Bowling average	28.72	21.17
5 wickets in innings	0	0
10 wickets in match	0	0
Best bowling	3/10	4/10
Catches/stumpings	6/–	14/–
- Source: CricketArchive, 18 October 2024

Kalea Moore (born 27 March 2003) is an English cricketer who currently plays for Surrey and Oval Invincibles. An all-rounder, she is a right-arm off break bowler and right-handed batter. She has previously played for Kent, South East Stars and Northern Superchargers.

== Early life ==
Moore was born on 27 March 2003 in Greenwich, Greater London. She attended St Lawrence College, Ramsgate.

== Domestic career ==
Moore made her county debut in 2019, for Kent against Yorkshire. That season, she took 4 wickets in the County Championship and 4 wickets in the Twenty20 Cup, helping Kent win their 8th Championship title. In 2021, she was Kent's leading wicket-taker in the Twenty20 Cup with 9 wickets at an average of 15.77, helping her side to win the South East Group. At the end of the season, she was named as Kent's Women's Club Player of the Year. She played eight matches for Kent in the 2022 Women's Twenty20 Cup, taking eight wickets at an average of 20.50. She played two matches for the side in the 2023 Women's Twenty20 Cup, including taking 4/10 against Oxfordshire.

In 2021, Moore was named as part of the South East Stars squad for their upcoming season. She made her debut for the side in the opening match of the Charlotte Edwards Cup, against Lightning. She went on to play every match in the competition that season, taking 6 wickets at an average of 21.16, as her side won the competition. She also played three matches in the Rachael Heyhoe Flint Trophy, and took four wickets in five matches for Northern Superchargers in The Hundred. In 2022, she played seven matches for South East Stars in the 2022 Charlotte Edwards Cup, scoring 133 runs and taking eight wickets at an average of 8.50. She scored her maiden Twenty20 half-century against Western Storm, making 57*. Moore was again in the Northern Superchargers squad in The Hundred, but missed the competition, and the rest of the season for Stars, due to injury. At the end of the 2022 season, it was announced that Moore had signed her first professional contract with South East Stars.

In 2023, she played 11 matches for South East Stars, across the Rachael Heyhoe Flint Trophy and the Charlotte Edwards Cup, as well as taking 5 wickets in 9 matches for Southern Brave in The Hundred. In 2024, she played 22 matches for South East Stars, across the Rachael Heyhoe Flint Trophy and the Charlotte Edwards Cup, scoring one half-century and taking 21 wickets.
