= Callum Parkinson =

English cricketer (born 1996)

Personal information
- Full name: Callum Francis Parkinson
- Born: 24 October 1996 (age 30); Bolton, Greater Manchester, England
- Batting: Right-handed
- Bowling: Slow left-arm orthodox
- Role: Spin bowler
- Relatives: Matt Parkinson (twin-brother)

Domestic team information
- Years: Team
- 2016: Derbyshire
- 2017–2023: Leicestershire (squad no. 10)
- 2021–2024: Sunrisers Leeds
- 2024—present: Durham (squad no. 17)
- 2025: Trent Rockets
- 2026: MI London (squad no. 17)
- First-class debut: 4 August 2016 Derbyshire v Leicestershire
- List A debut: 16 May 2017 Leicestershire v Yorkshire

Career statistics
Competition	FC	LA	T20
Matches	93	17	153
Runs scored	1,660	237	329
Batting average	17.47	29.62	11.34
100s/50s	0/2	0/1	0/0
Top score	75	52*	27*
Balls bowled	17,611	772	3,153
Wickets	242	9	183
Bowling average	39.17	83.00	21.77
5 wickets in innings	9	0	0
10 wickets in match	2	0	0
Best bowling	8/148	2/35	4/20
Catches/stumpings	20/–	2/–	26/–
- Source: CricketArchive, 27 September 2026

Callum Francis Parkinson (born 24 October 1996) is an English cricketer who plays for Durham. Primarily a slow left arm orthodox bowler, he bats right handed. He is the twin-brother of Kent and England spinner, Matt Parkinson.

On 17 September 2016, Parkinson rejected a new contract at Derbyshire and signed for Leicestershire ahead of the 2017 season. He made his List A debut for Leicestershire in the 2017 Royal London One-Day Cup on 16 May 2017. He made his Twenty20 debut for Leicestershire in the 2017 NatWest t20 Blast on 9 July 2017.

In April 2022, he was bought by the Northern Superchargers for the 2022 season of The Hundred.

In June 2023, Parkinson joined Durham on a three-year contract starting from the 2024 season. He agreed two further one-year extensions in July 2026 and November 2026, tying him into the club until at least the end of the 2028 season.
