= David Willey (cricketer) =

English cricketer (born 1990)

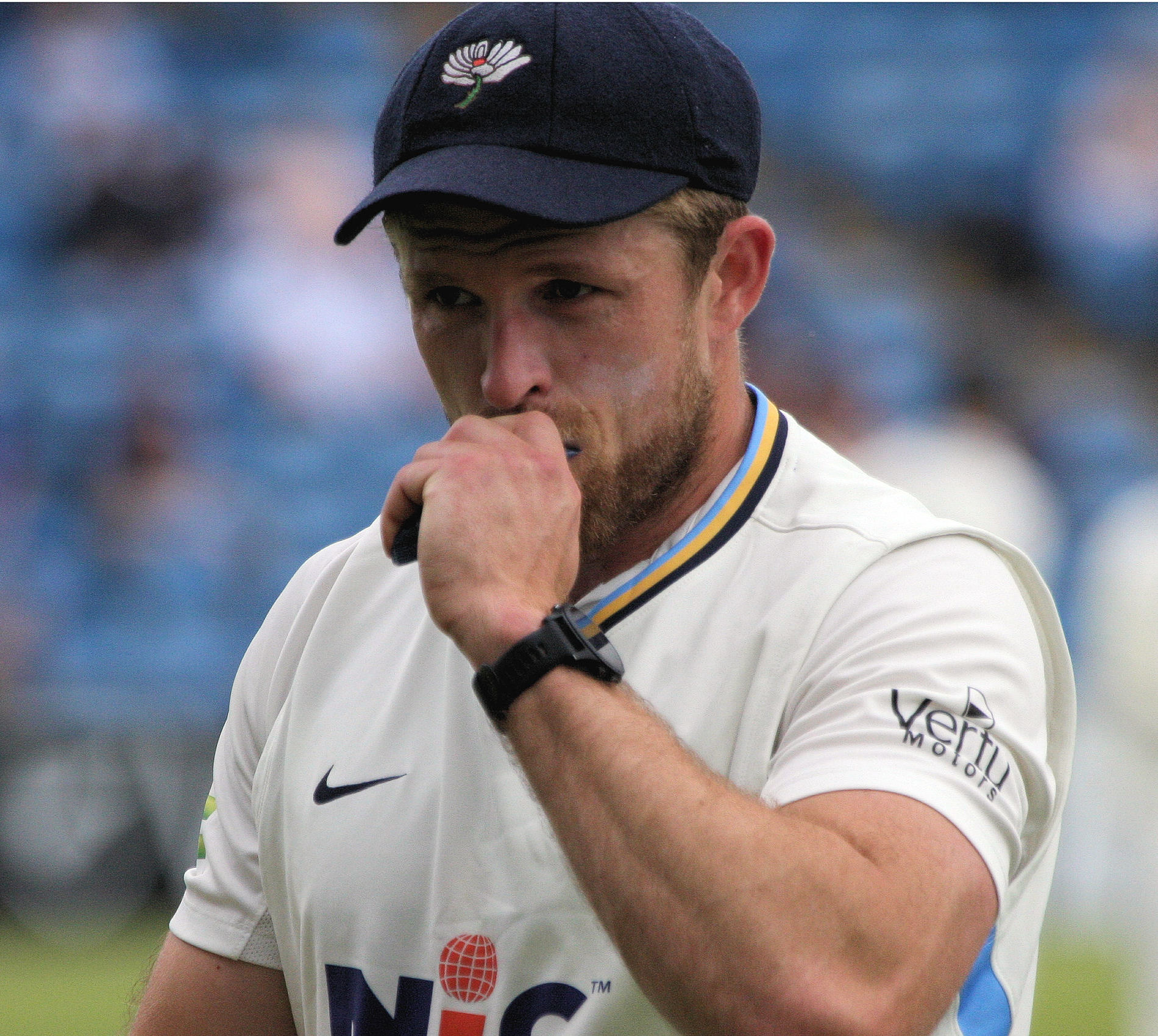
- Willey preparing to bowl, June 2021

Personal information
- Full name: David Jonathan Willey
- Born: 28 February 1990 (age 36); Northampton, Northamptonshire, England
- Height: 6 ft 1 in (1.85 m)
- Batting: Left-handed
- Bowling: Left-arm fast-medium
- Role: Bowling all-rounder
- Relatives: Peter Willey (father)

International information
- National side: England (2015–2023)
- ODI debut (cap 240): 8 May 2015 v Ireland
- Last ODI: 11 November 2023 v Pakistan
- ODI shirt no.: 15
- T20I debut (cap 72): 23 June 2015 v New Zealand
- Last T20I: 14 October 2022 v Australia
- T20I shirt no.: 15

Domestic team information
- Years: Team
- 2009–2015: Northamptonshire
- 2015/16–2018/19: Perth Scorchers
- 2016–2022: Yorkshire
- 2018: Chennai Super Kings
- 2021–2022: Northern Superchargers
- 2024–2025: Multan Sultans
- 2022–2023: Royal Challengers Bangalore
- 2022–2023: Durban's Super Giants
- 2023–present: Northamptonshire
- 2023–2024: Welsh Fire
- 2025: Trent Rockets
- 2025/26–: Sydney Thunder
- 2026: London Spirit

Career statistics
Competition	ODI	T20I	FC	LA
Matches	73	43	77	156
Runs scored	663	226	2,515	2,145
Batting average	24.55	15.06	27.33	25.53
100s/50s	0/2	0/0	2/14	3/7
Top score	51	33*	104*	167
Balls bowled	3,230	865	10,745	6,021
Wickets	100	51	198	188
Bowling average	29.75	23.13	29.77	29.87
5 wickets in innings	1	0	6	2
10 wickets in match	0	0	1	0
Best bowling	5/30	4/7	5/29	5/30
Catches/stumpings	27/–	17/–	18/–	53/–
Medal record
Men's Cricket
Representing England
ICC Men's T20 World Cup
Winner	2022 Australia
Runner-up	2016 India
- Source: ESPNcricinfo, 12 November 2023

David Jonathan Willey (born 28 February 1990) is an English former international cricketer. He is a left-handed batsman and bowler. He is the son of former England cricketer and international umpire Peter Willey. Willey was a member of the England team that won the 2022 T20 World Cup. On 1 November 2023, he announced his retirement from international cricket, following the 2023 Cricket World Cup.

Willey married singer-songwriter Carolynne Willey in November 2016.

== Domestic career ==
=== Northamptonshire ===
Willey started his career playing for his home county Northamptonshire in the County Championship division two. Having come through the ranks at Northampton playing for O.N's and Northants Academy, he got his chance in the 2009 season aged 19 after a good pre-season. His first game came against Leicestershire, the first game of the season against one of his father's old clubs. He scored 60 on debut after a good partnership with Andrew Hall, but did not continue this in the televised game against Essex in his first one day game getting out for a duck with a poor shot. His first wicket came in his second first-class against Kent when he had Phil Edwards out LBW. On 8 May he was rewarded with a two-year professional contract after impressing during the start of the season. It was in the Twenty20 that he excelled in, but this time with his bowling taking 3/9 in his first spell against Worcestershire and finished the 2009 competition with an average of 11.30. He appeared alongside Northants teammate Jack Brooks on Cricket AM feature, Brain vs Brawn, in 2010.

In 2013, Willey helped Northamptonshire to a 102-run victory in a rain-shortened Friends Life Twenty20 Final against Surrey where he made 60 with the bat, then had figures of 4/9, including a match-ending hat-trick to clean up the tail.

=== Yorkshire ===
On 19 August 2015, it was announced that Willey would be joining Yorkshire on a three-year contract at the start of the 2016 season. He made his Yorkshire debut against Nottinghamshire at Trent Bridge on 1 May 2016.

=== Northamptonshire ===
In 2023, Willey returned to Northamptonshire after signing a four-year contract. He was appointed captain for the T20 Blast. In June 2026, he signed a new three-year contract tying him into the club until at least the end of the 2029 season. Willey captained Northamptonshire to the 2026 Blast title, taking first-ball wickets in both the semi-final and final.

=== Big Bash League ===
Willey was signed by Perth Scorchers for the 2015–16 BBL season. After a successful first season, he was retained for the 2016–17 season. In the first match against the Adelaide Strikers, he performed well with the ball, taking 2 wickets, however, he scored only 2 runs off five balls with the bat. In the Scorchers' second match against the Sydney Sixers, he scored one run and didn't take a wicket, in a heavy defeat. In the third match against the Melbourne Renegades he bowled well, taking two wickets with the ball before Ashton Agar scored a six to win in the final over. He was again retained by the Scorchers for the 2017–18 season, as the only overseas player for the franchise.

In January 2026, mid-way through the 2025/26 BBL season, Willey was signed for the first time in 8 years in the BBL, to the Sydney Thunder, only one day before the Thunder's next match.

=== The Hundred ===
Willey was signed by Northern Superchargers for the inaugural edition of The Hundred tournament. He was the team's captain for the first edition of the tournament as planned captain Faf du Plessis was ruled out. When du Plessis returned in 2022, Willey was replaced by him as captain. In 2023 he joined Welsh Fire where he spent two seasons before moving to become captain of Trent Rockets for 2025.

=== Indian Premier League ===
Chennai Super Kings signed Willey for the 2018 IPL season to replace Kedar Jadhav, who was injured during the first match of the tournament, and he was also sought as a replacement for the injured New Zealand spinner, Mitchell Santner. During the time of his late IPL call, David Willey was playing county cricket matches for Yorkshire before agreeing to play for CSK. He also became the 12th English player to be called up to play at the 2018 IPL season. During the 2018 IPL edition, he was also one of three England cricketers to have received the late IPL call-ups along with Liam Plunkett (for DD) and Alex Hales (for SRH).

Chennai Super Kings retained David Willey for the 2019 IPL season. He was released by the Chennai Super Kings ahead of the 2020 IPL auction. In February 2022, he was bought by the Royal Challengers Bangalore in the auction for the 2022 Indian Premier League tournament.

== International career ==
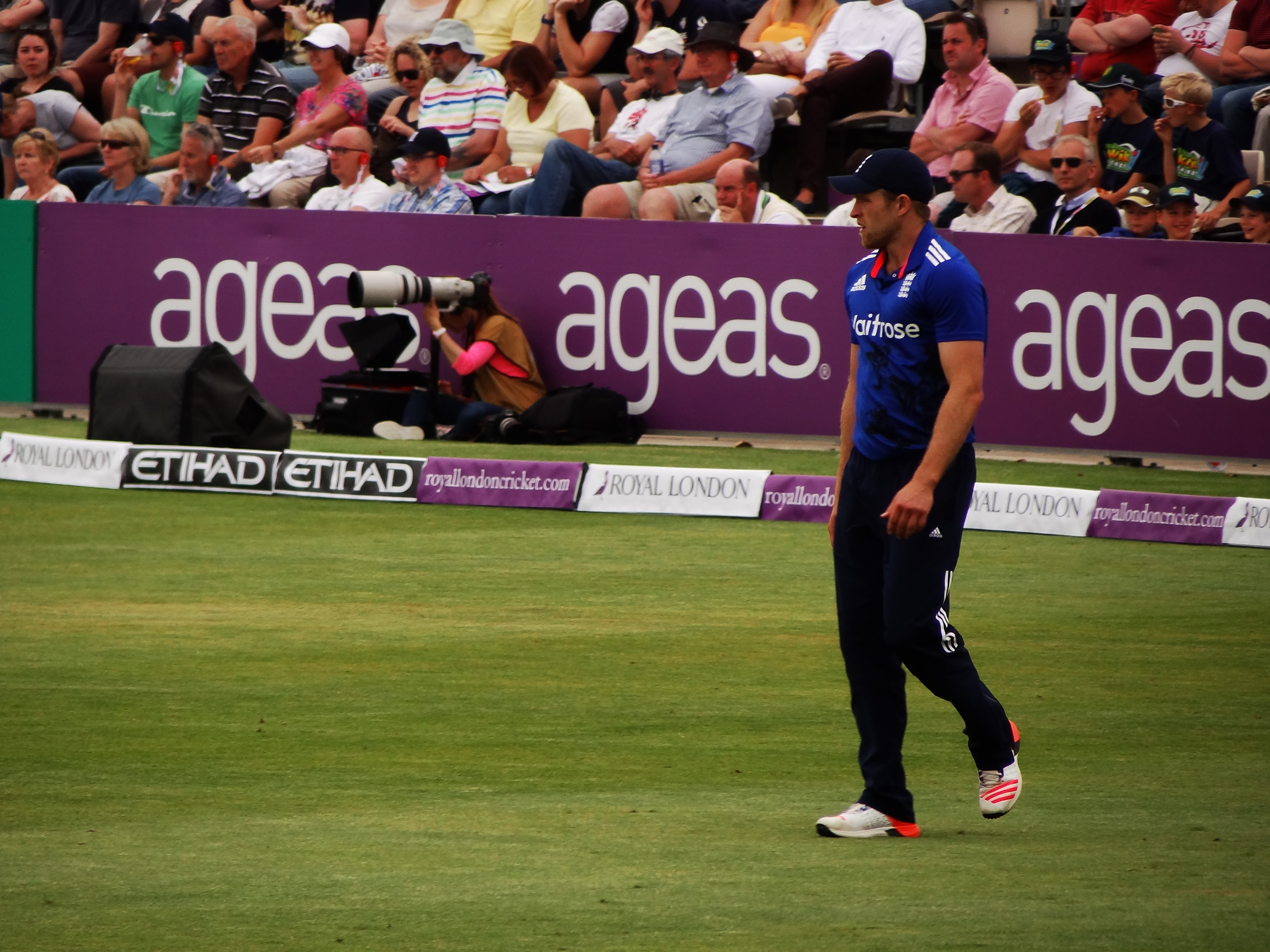
Willey playing for England in 2015

=== 2015 Ireland ===
Willey was selected in the England U19 cricket squad for the Tests against Bangladesh. Although he did not play in the first Test, he scored 65 in the first innings of the second Test. He made his One Day International debut for England against Ireland on 8 May 2015 and took his first wicket in a rain-affected match.

=== 2015 New Zealand, Australia and Pakistan ===
Willey was also called up to the England ODI team on 14 June 2015 against New Zealand and played in the third match of the series. He took a wicket with his 2nd ball and finished with figures of 3–69. In the fourth match of the series he took figures of 2–89 as England went on to win the game comfortably. He took 2–50 in the final game of the series as England won the series 3–2. Willey made his Twenty20 International debut in the same series on 23 June 2015. He took figures of 3–22 and scored six runs to help England win the match.

Willey played in the only T20 against Australia, which England won by five runs, taking figures of 2–32. He played in the final two ODIs against Australia, taking figures of 3–51 in the fourth ODI as England won by 3 wickets. In the final ODI, Willey was out for a duck but took 1–13 as England lost the match and the series 3–2.

Willey kept his place in the side against Pakistan for the ODI series. He didn't take a wicket in the first game, but returned with figures of 3–25 in the second match to help England win by 95 runs. In the third game he took 1–45, before taking 2–34 in the final game of the series to help restrict Pakistan to 271 as England won by 84 runs.

=== 2015–16 South Africa ===
Willey played in the first three matches against South Africa and took 1–30 in the first match, as England won by 39 runs on the DL Method. In the second and third match he failed to take a wicket, and did not play in the final two games. England eventually lost the series 3–2. Willey played in the first T20I against South Africa, taking figures of 0–15 and scoring an unbeaten seven with the bat, although England lost the game by 3 wickets.

=== 2016 T20 World Cup ===
Willey played every game in England's 2016 World T20 campaign. He took 1–33 against the West Indies and 1–40 against South Africa. He played a crucial role in the win over Afghanistan, making an unbeaten 20 to guide England to 141, before taking 2–23 with the ball. In that same match, partnered with Moeen Ali, he set the record for the highest partnership for the 8th wicket in T20 World Cup history, 57 runs. Willey continued to impress against Sri Lanka, taking figures of 2–26. After the match, Willey was found guilty and was fined 15% of his match fee for using obscene language and for giving Sri Lankan batsman Milinda Siriwardana a send-off by pointing towards the pavilion. In the semi-final against New Zealand, he took figures of 1–17 as England progressed to the final. While Willey bowled well, taking figures of 3–20, England fell just short and lost the game to finish as runners-up. He was named in the 'Team of the Tournament' for the 2016 T20 World Cup by the ICC.

=== 2016 Sri Lanka, Pakistan and Bangladesh ===
Willey took 2–56 in the first ODI against Sri Lanka which ended in a tie. He took 1–65 in the second match as England won by 10 wickets and took a further wicket in the third ODI, which was abandoned due to rain. In the fourth match of the series, he took figures of 2–58 to help restrict Sri Lanka to 305 and England went on to secure a six-wicket victory. In the final match of the series, he took 4–34 to help England win the match by 122 runs and the series 3–0.

Willey played in the fourth ODI against Pakistan, although he didn't pick up a wicket and finished with figures of 0–40, although England won the match. England lost the final match of the series, with Willey failing to pick up a wicket. England won the series 4–1. Willey played in the only T20 between the two sides, making 12 with the bat and taking figures of 0–16 as England lost by nine wickets.

Willey did not take a wicket in the first ODI against Bangladesh, which England won by 21 runs. In the second match he finished with figures of 0–36 as England lost by 34 runs. He did not play in the final match of the series, which England won.

=== 2017 India, West Indies ===
In the first ODI, Willey made an unbeaten ten runs before taking figures of 2–47 as England lost by three wickets. He took 0–32 in the second ODI as India won by 15 runs. In the final ODI he took figures of 1–8 but was injured, although England won by five runs.

In September, Willey started the first match of the ODI series against West Indies by taking a figure of 1–39 as England won the match by seven wickets. He was selected for the next match but he could not play as the match was abandoned due to rain after only two balls were played Willey took a figure of 1–34 as England defeated West Indies again in the third match. He did not play the last two matches of the series but England managed to win those matches and the series 4–0.

=== 2018 Tri-Series, Australia ===
In the second T20 match of the tri-series, Willey scored only three runs but then he took a figure of 3–28 which was not enough for England as they lost against Australia. Willey scored ten runs and took a figure of 1–30 as England were defeated again by Australia in the third match. He scored twenty-one runs and didn't take any wicket in the next match as England suffered their third defeat of the series against New Zealand. He scored ten runs and failed to take any wicket but England managed to defeat New Zealand this time in their final match of the series.

Willey took a figure of 1–41 and scored an unbeaten thirty-five runs as England defeated Australia in the first match of the ODI series. In the next match, he scored eleven runs and took no wicket as England managed to defeat Australia again. Willey took a figure of 2–56 as England won the third match with a record-smashing 481 for 6 against Australia which is also the highest score in the history of ODI cricket and also the most crushing defeat in terms of runs ever inflicted upon Australia. Willey took four wickets and conceded forty-three runs as his side won again against Australia in the fourth match. He didn't play the last match of the series though England won the match and the series 5–0.

Willey took a figure of 1–31 as England won the only T20 against Australia.

=== 2019 Cricket World Cup and beyond ===
In April 2019, Willey was named in England's provisional squad for the 2019 Cricket World Cup. On 21 May 2019, England finalised their squad for the World Cup, with Willey not named in the final fifteen-man team.

On 29 May 2020, Willey was named in a 55-man group of players to begin training ahead of international fixtures starting in England following the COVID-19 pandemic. On 9 July 2020, Willey was included in England's 24-man squad to start training behind closed doors for the ODI series against Ireland. On 27 July 2020, Willey was named in England's squad for the ODI series. On 30 July 2020, in the opening match against Ireland, Willey took his first five-wicket haul in an ODI match, with figures of 5/30 from 8.4 overs.

On 29 June 2021, in the opening fixture against Sri Lanka, Willey played in his 50th ODI match. In September 2021, Willey was named in England's squad for the 2021 ICC Men's T20 World Cup.

=== 2023 World Cup ===
With defending champions England finishing in the seventh place in 2023 World Cup, David Willey announced his retirement following the World Cup. He took 3 for 56 from his 10 overs on a winning cause in his last match against Pakistan, which was played on 11 November 2023 at Eden Gardens, Kolkata.
