= Adil Rashid =

English cricketer (born 1988)

Adil Rashid MBE
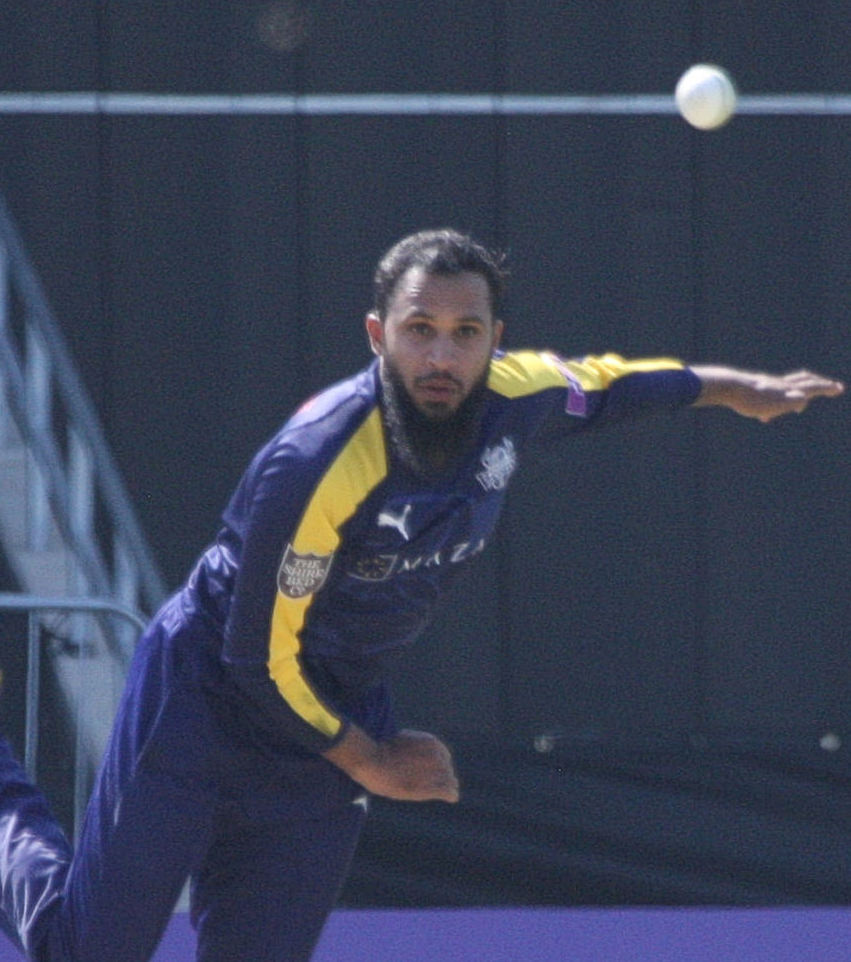
- Rashid bowling for Yorkshire in 2019

Personal information
- Full name: Adil Usman Rashid
- Born: 17 February 1988 (age 38); Bradford, West Yorkshire, England
- Nickname: Dil, Dilly, Rash
- Height: 5 ft 8 in (1.73 m)
- Batting: Right-handed
- Bowling: Right-arm leg break
- Role: Bowler

International information
- National side: England (2009–present)
- Test debut (cap 668): 13 October 2015 v Pakistan
- Last Test: 23 January 2019 v West Indies
- ODI debut (cap 210): 27 August 2009 v Ireland
- Last ODI: 20 October 2026 v Pakistan
- ODI shirt no.: 95
- T20I debut (cap 46): 5 June 2009 v Netherlands
- Last T20I: 19 September 2026 v Sri Lanka
- T20I shirt no.: 95

Domestic team information
- Years: Team
- 2006–present: Yorkshire
- 2010/11–2011/12: South Australia
- 2015/16: Adelaide Strikers
- 2017: Dhaka Dynamites
- 2021–2025: Northern Superchargers
- 2021: Punjab Kings
- 2023–24: Pretoria Capitals
- 2023: Sunrisers Hyderabad
- 2024–2025/26: Sharjah Warriorz
- 2026: Southern Brave

Career statistics
Competition	Test	ODI	T20I	FC
Matches	19	165	153	175
Runs scored	540	972	163	6,822
Batting average	19.28	16.20	7.40	32.48
100s/50s	0/2	0/1	0/0	10/37
Top score	61	69	22	180
Balls bowled	3,816	8,237	3,178	29,901
Wickets	60	244	171	512
Bowling average	39.83	31.79	23.42	35.05
5 wickets in innings	2	2	0	20
10 wickets in match	0	0	0	1
Best bowling	5/49	5/27	4/2	7/107
Catches/stumpings	4/–	54/–	42/–	79/–
Medal record
Men's Cricket
Representing England
ICC Cricket World Cup
Winner	2019 England and Wales
ICC T20 World Cup
Winner	2022 Australia
- Source: ESPNcricinfo, 29 October 2026

Adil Usman Rashid MBE (born 17 February 1988) is an English cricketer who plays for England in One Day International (ODI) and Twenty20 International (T20I) cricket, and previously played for the Test team. In domestic cricket, he represents Yorkshire, and has played in multiple Twenty20 leagues. He is regarded as one of the best limited overs English spinners of all time.

Rashid made his ODI and T20I debuts in 2009, and played for the Test team between 2015 and 2019. He was part of the England teams that won the 2019 Cricket World Cup and 2022 T20 World Cup.

Rashid plays as a right-arm leg break bowler. He is England's highest wicket-taker among spin bowlers in both ODIs and T20Is, and England's highest wicket-taker in T20Is. He surpassed the previous record held by Chris Jordan, who has 108 wickets. Along with Jos Buttler, he holds the world record for highest seventh-wicket stand in ODIs: 177 against New Zealand in 2015. In 2023 Rashid was named an MBE in King Charles III's Birthday honours list.

== Background ==
Rashid was born in Bradford, West Yorkshire on 17 February 1988, and is of Pakistani descent. Like his England teammate Moeen Ali, he belongs to the Mirpuri community, his family having migrated to England in 1967 from Mirpur, Kashmir.

His brothers Haroon and Amar are also cricketers.

== Early career ==
=== Early promise ===
Rashid showed promise from a young age: Terry Jenner spotted him as a 14-year-old, and, in early July 2005, aged 17, he took 6–13 for Yorkshire's Academy (youth) team. A few days later he hit 111 for Yorkshire Cricket Board Under-17s against their Cheshire equivalents in the Under-17s County Championship.

In 2006, he played a number of games for Yorkshire Second XI, making four successive centuries. This form, combined with a calf injury to Darren Lehmann, earned him the chance to make his first-class debut.

=== 2006: County debut and youth Tests ===
Rashid made his county cricket debut against Warwickshire at North Marine Road, Scarborough, as a replacement for injured overseas batsman Darren Lehmann. In the second innings he bowled a magnificent 6/67 to rip through Warwickshire's middle order and win the match for Yorkshire. Rashid was then included in the England Under-19s Test squad for their series against India Under-19s. Making his debut for the side in the first Test at Canterbury, he scored 13 and 23 runs and took one wicket. In the second Test, at Taunton, he produced a dominant all-round display, scoring 114 and 48 and claiming 8/157 and 2/45. He also played in the third Test at the Denis Compton Oval in Shenley, but made less of an impression, only taking three wickets and scoring 15 and 12 runs.

From mid-August until the end of the season, he held down a regular spot in the Yorkshire side. He continued to impress, taking 4/96 against Middlesex at Scarborough and scoring 63, his maiden first-class half-century, against Nottinghamshire at Headingley as part of a fourth-wicket stand of 130 with Craig White to dig Yorkshire out of a hole from 42/3 before helping to bowl out Nottinghamshire's tail to win the match for Yorkshire. Rashid also featured in a two-day "spin match" held by the England and Wales Cricket Board, a programme which would simulate different match-based scenarios to develop young spin bowlers.

=== 2007: Young Player of the Year ===
During the winter, Rashid suffered from a stress fracture in his back and missed England Under-19s' tour of Malaysia, but he recovered well enough to be picked for the 2006–07 England A tour of Bangladesh. Despite unimpressive performances, he was tipped by Yorkshire teammate Jason Gillespie to play international cricket for England in the future.

Adil is probably the best young cricketer in England ... I think he could play an allround role for England in the future.

— Jason Gillespie

Rashid started the English summer at Lord's, playing for Marylebone Cricket Club (MCC) against the 2006 champion county, Sussex. In his County Championship game of the season, at The Oval against Surrey a few days later, he hit 86 in the first innings, putting on 190 with Jacques Rudolph for the sixth wicket. This established a new partnership record for the sixth wicket for Yorkshire against Surrey, surpassing a mark that had stood since 1902. At the end of April he continued to impress with bowling figures of 5/88 against Durham at Headingley. Due to his form he was picked to play for England Lions in a tour match against India.

Rashid was considered to play for England's Under-19 side again in their series against Pakistan, but his Yorkshire coach Martyn Moxon showed displeasure at the idea of Rashid being pulled away from county cricket. The selectors decided that as Rashid had progressed to the next level of cricket, having appeared for England Lions, and therefore he shouldn't be pulled out of county cricket to play for England Under-19s. In continuing to play county cricket, he scored his maiden first-class century, 108 against Worcestershire at Kidderminster, and another half-century against Warwickshire.

Over the course of the 2007 English cricket season, Rashid scored 837 with a batting average of 44.05 and took 43 wickets with a bowling average of 42.16 across all first-class matches. He took the most wickets of any Yorkshire player and scored the fourth-most runs. He won several awards in 2007 for his strong form. In June 2007 he won both the YCCSA Young Player of the Year Award for 2006 and the Neil Lloyd Young Cricketer of the Year Award for 2006. On 9 September Rashid was named 2007 Cricket Writers' Club Young Cricketer of the Year, while on 24 September he was awarded the title of PCA Young Player of the Year.

In October 2007, Rashid was named in the "England Performance Programme squad", to train at home and in India during the 2007–08 winter.

=== 2008: First tour with national team ===
In January 2008, Rashid was named in the England Lions squad for the 2007–08 Duleep Trophy in India. He played two games for the tournament and took six wickets. For the second season in a row he was also named in the Marylebone Cricket Club squad to play against the champion county, this time Sussex. He also retained his place in the England Performance Programme squad.

There was concern early in the season that Rashid's bowling was losing some of its variety as it seemed his batting was taking precedence, but he then took career-best bowling figures of 7/107 against Hampshire at the Rose Bowl. He followed this up with hauls of 5/95 against Lancashire and 7/136 against Sussex. Rashid finished the season with 62 wickets, Yorkshire's leading wicket-taker for the second year in a row.

At the end of the year, Rashid was included in the English national team for their tour of India, though he wasn't expected to play any matches, only being on the tour for the experience. He was then included in England's squad for their following tour of the West Indies, where he was part of England's team for a tour match against a Saint Kitts and Nevis team. National selector Geoff Miller, described Rashid's selection at the age of 20 in the following terms:

Adil Rashid... is an exciting prospect for the future and his inclusion will enable us to continue to monitor his development closely as well as providing extra competition for places in the spin-bowling department.

— Geoff Miller

== Early international call-ups ==
=== 2009: World Twenty20 and ODI debut ===
Rashid was again included in the England Lions team for a tour match against the West Indies, and he had a good all-round performance, scoring 72 runs in England Lions' first innings and taking 3/66 in the West Indies' second innings. Despite not being included in Yorkshire's side for their first two Twenty20 matches of the season, Rashid's form saw him called up to the national team for the 2009 ICC World Twenty20 as an injury replacement for Andrew Flintoff. In England's first warm-up match for the tournament against Scotland, Rashid appeared nervous, but in their second warm-up match against the West Indies he appeared more settled and took 1/20 from his 4 overs. During the tournament itself he had impressive performances against Pakistan and the West Indies, and he finished the tournament with 3 wickets at an average of 31.66 and with an economy of 7.30 runs per over from his 4 matches.

Following his World Twenty20 appearances, he was included in England's training squad for the 2009 Ashes series against Australia, thought to be a potential replacement for the out-of-form Monty Panesar, but instead of playing a warm-up game with the England XI he played with England Lions again in a tour match against Australia. He was left out of England's final squad for the Ashes and instead returned to playing county cricket with Yorkshire. Rashid scored his career-best 117 not out and later on helped Yorkshire to bowl Hampshire out with figures of 5/41. He then went on to better that against Lancashire, scoring an unbeaten 157 and taking 5/97 in the first innings. The feat of scoring a century and taking a five-for in a match was the third of his career; the last player to have achieved the feat twice in a season for Yorkshire was George Hirst back in 1911.

Rashid made his One Day International debut for England on 27 August 2009 against Ireland. He scored 7 runs and had bowling figures of 1/16 in a narrow win. He kept his place in the side for the 1st ODI against Australia, and he was the best of England's bowlers, only conceding 37 runs from his 10 overs. He followed this up with a quickfire 31 not out from just 23 balls with the bat to almost get England across the line in a tight finish. He impressed Australians Michael Clarke and James Hopes with his strong performance, but he was shockingly omitted from the English side for the next match. He did return for two more matches during the series, but finished with only 2 wickets at an average of 74.

=== 2009–10: South Africa and Pakistan A ===
Rashid completely supplanted Monty Panesar in the England side, being named as the back-up to Graeme Swann for both the Test and ODI squads in their tour of South Africa. He played in the second Twenty20 International between the sides, but was only used for one over in which he conceded 25 runs, after which South Africa's coach Mickey Arthur criticized the English side for not showing enough faith in Rashid's ability. Due to an injury to Swann, Rashid was brought back into the side for the 2nd ODI, but he bowled an expensive three overs, conceding 27 runs, and was dropped once Swann was fit again. He was then dropped from South Africa's ODI squad altogether for the rest of the series, instead playing four-day matches with the England Performance Programme. Meanwhile, offspinner James Tredwell remained on stand-by to potentially play, indicating that Rashid had dropped down the pecking order. His poor form continued in the England Performance Programme matches, and though he re-joined the main squad ahead of the Test series he did not play in any Test matches.

Following the poor tour for Rashid, he was left out of England's squad for their tour of Bangladesh, instead being sent to the United Arab Emirates to play for England Lions against Pakistan A. His time in the UAE was somewhat more successful than his time in South Africa, and he took 3/13 in the second Twenty20 against Pakistan A to secure a series win for England Lions. After the Twenty20 series against Pakistan A, England Lions also played a Twenty20 against the main England team and Rashid helped cause a shock upset win with another strong bowling performance of 3/22.

== Continued domestic career ==
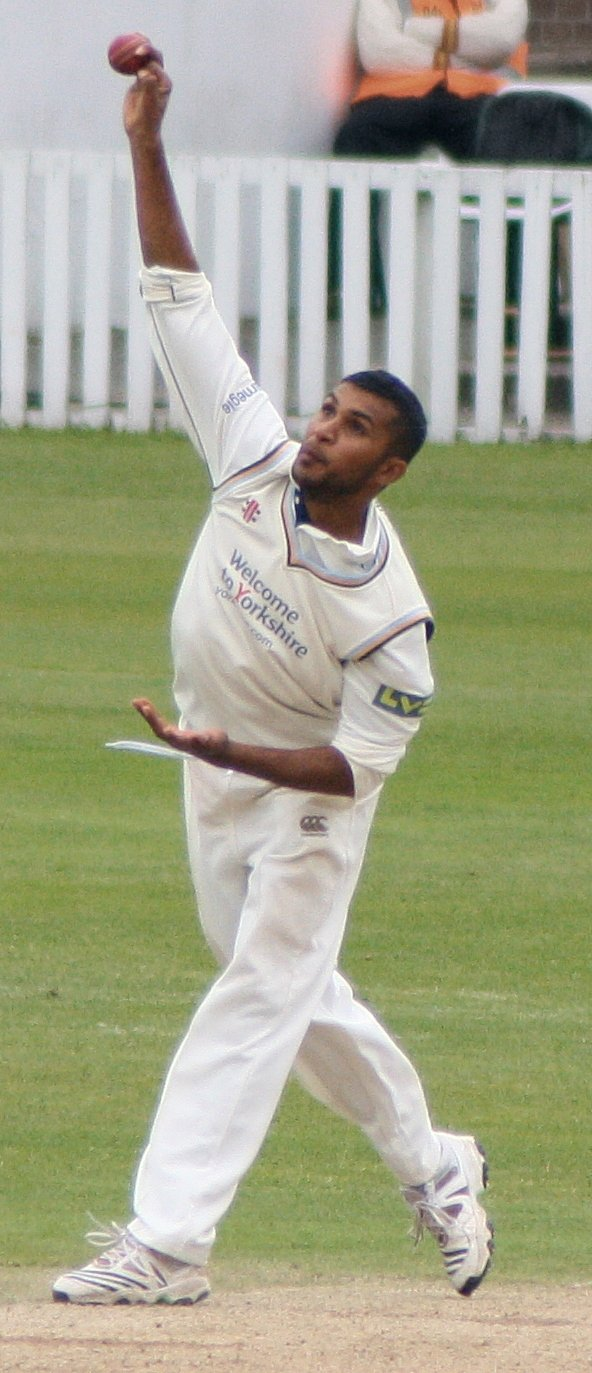
Rashid playing for Yorkshire in 2010

=== 2010–11: Overlooked by national selectors; Big Bash ===
Following his unsuccessful winter abroad, Rashid returned to playing county cricket with Yorkshire in the 2010 summer. He immediately showed that he still had the potential to return to the English national team, showing his batting skills with an impressive innings against Warwickshire in his first match of the season. His self-confidence returned throughout the season and he had several impressive performances with both ball and bat in the county championship, finishing the season with 732 runs at 45.75 and 57 wickets at 31.29, as well as taking 26 wickets in the 2010 Twenty20 Cup, the most by any of the Yorkshire bowlers and the fourth-most overall. Despite his strong performances throughout the season he was still overlooked by English selectors, being left out of their home series against Bangladesh and the squad for the 2010–11 Ashes series in favour of Monty Panesar.

Not having been selected to play for England over the 2010–11 winter, Rashid instead played for South Australia in the 2010–11 KFC Twenty20 Big Bash. He played a useful role in the team alongside fellow spinner Nathan Lyon, and finished the season with 10 wickets, one behind the tournament's leaders Lyon and Pat Cummins, as South Australia won the tournament. Following the Big Bash, Rashid was selected to play for England Lions on a tour of the West Indies, during which they played in the local first-class competition, the 2010–11 Regional Four Day Competition.

=== 2011–12: Decline in form ===
Rashid started the 2011 season well by taking 6/77 and 5/37 in Yorkshire's opening match against Worcestershire, but overall he struggled for form, and conceded the worst bowling figures of his career, and the third-worst ever for Yorkshire, when he bowled no wicket for 187 runs against Sussex. His poor form continued into the 2012 season, and he found himself dropped from Yorkshire's team for the first time in his county career. This came as a result of his worst ever start to a county season, taking nine wickets at 49.00 in his first six matches. Yorkshire's president Geoffrey Boycott lamented that Rashid had not appeared to progress at all since he started playing county cricket, and said that Rashid needed to take responsibility for his poor performances. In ten first-class matches in 2012 he took just 16 wickets at an average of 41 and made 129 runs at 16.12, his decline meaning he was no longer even asked to play for England Lions anymore.

=== 2013–14: Return to form ===
Just hours before the start of the 2013 county season, Rashid was quoted by the Independent as saying that if his 2013 season didn't go well he'd request to go on loan from Yorkshire to a different county, which forced Yorkshire to deny that there was any rift between Rashid and the club. Martyn Moxon, then Yorkshire's director of cricket, said that the interview had been in January, months before the start of the season and that there hadn't been any issues. Rashid also showed that his poor form was behind him as he started the season with his highest first-class score, a 180 against Somerset. He followed this up with two more centuries, one against Warwickshire and a second against Somerset, taking his average for the county season up to that point above 200. In 2014 Rashid continued to improve his bowling, particularly in limited overs cricket, bowling career-best figures of 5/33 in a one-day match against Hampshire.

In April 2022, he was bought by the Northern Superchargers for the 2022 season of The Hundred.

== Return to international cricket ==
=== 2014–15: South Africa A, West Indies and Ireland ===
Due to his form in county cricket, Rashid was named in the England Lions squad for their tour of South Africa in early 2015, set to play in both their first-class and one-day series against South Africa A. He batted well on the tour with innings of 78 and 68 in the unofficial Tests. In March 2015, Rashid was named in the England Test squad for the tour of the West Indies. In the tour matches leading up to England's Test series against the West Indies, Rashid did not perform well enough to get into the Test side, with the selectors favouring James Tredwell ahead of him. Despite not being used in the Test matches, he was not allowed to return to England to play with Yorkshire at the beginning of the county cricket season, though Rashid did leave the tour early to join England's ODI team for their match against Ireland. After the match, Yorkshire hired a private jet to fly Rashid back in time for their next county match against Hampshire, where he took four wickets in each innings.

=== 2015: Return to ODI side against New Zealand and Australia ===
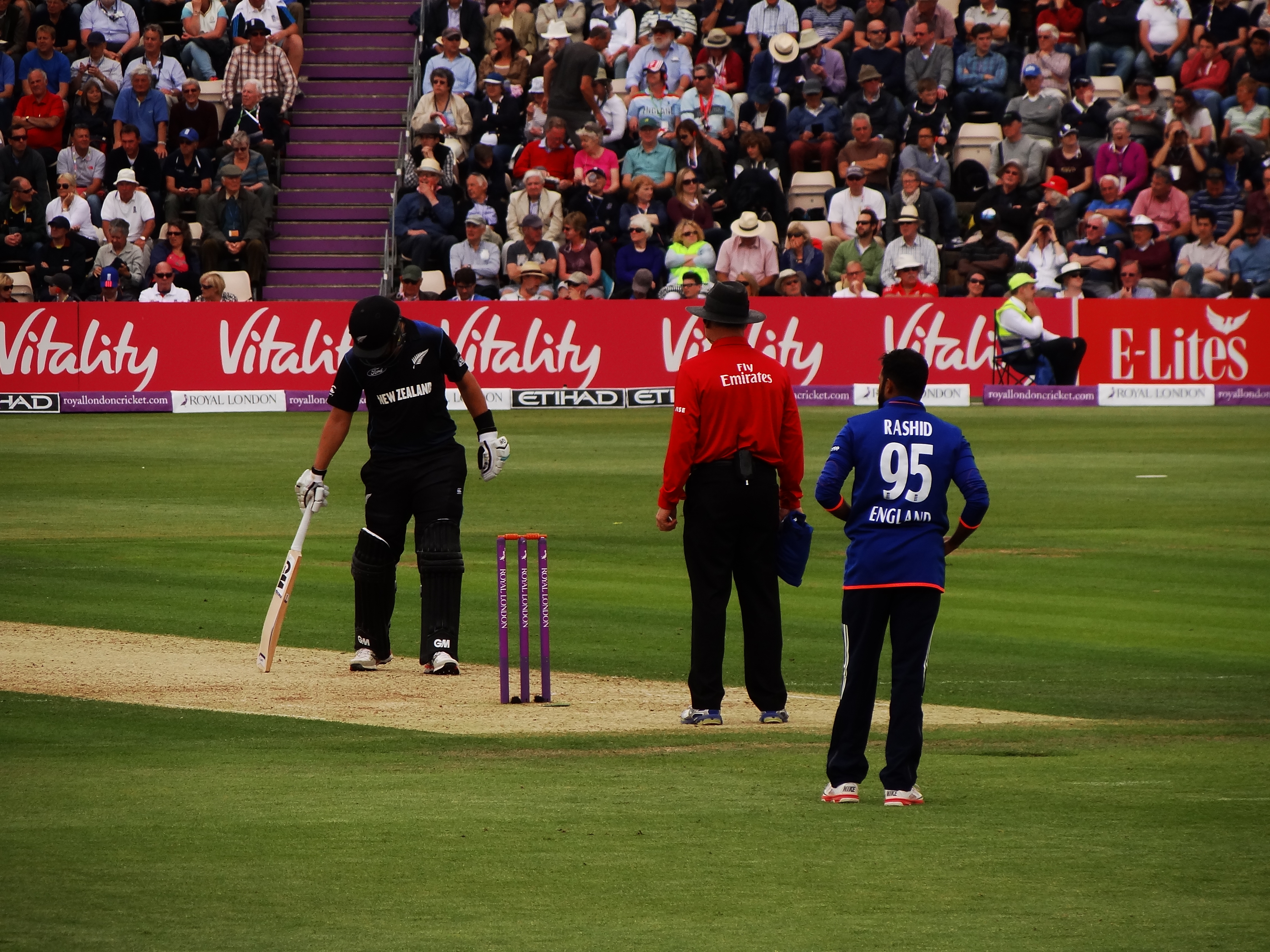
Rashid preparing to bowl against New Zealand in 2015

With the 2015 Ashes around the corner, the English selectors decided to rest Moeen Ali from their ODI series against New Zealand and brought in Rashid as his replacement. Rashid had an immediate impact in the first match of the series, being involved in the highest 7th wicket partnership of ODI history with Jos Buttler, where they scored 177 runs. Rashid reached his maiden half-century in just 37 balls and went on to score 69 runs, then he gave the most eye-catching bowling of the match as well, making use of his googly to take the wicket of Kane Williamson and finishing with figures of 4/55. Rashid played all five matches of the series for England and finished with a total of 8 wickets.

Rashid was included in England's 13-man squad for the first Test of the Ashes, but the selectors decided that they would only use Rashid in the Test as a second spinner alongside Moeen Ali if there was a spinning pitch. Rashid remained in the Test squad for every match of the Ashes but did not play, and instead he continued playing county cricket for Yorkshire, scoring a century against Durham. Although he had not played in the Ashes at all, Rashid did get to play in the ODI series against Australia and solidified his spot in the team with figures of 4/59 in the 1st ODI and 2/41 in the 3rd ODI. Across the five-match series he took 7 wickets, the most of England's bowlers.

=== 2015 Pakistan ===
In October 2015, Rashid was selected in the England touring party to play Pakistan in the UAE making his debut in the First Test at Sheikh Zayed Cricket Stadium. Rashid had a torrid time in the first innings of his first match in the Test side, finishing with figures of 0–163 as Pakistan posted 523 – the worst figures by a Test debutant. However, he enjoyed a remarkable turn around of fortunes in the next innings, finishing with figures of 5–64, a return that was nearly good enough for England to win the match, although it eventually finished in a draw. In the second Test he took 1–84 in Pakistan's first innings and 1–107 in their second as England lost the game by 178 runs, although Rashid made his maiden Test half-century in England's second innings, hitting 61. In the third and final Test, Rashid did not take a wicket in Pakistan's first innings, and in the second innings he finished with 1–97 as England lost the match and the series 2–0.

Following the Test series, Rashid played in the ODI series. He only took one wicket in the first three games, finishing with figures of 0–60 in the first game, which England lost. After taking 1–32 in the second match, he again finished wicketless in the third match of the series. He was expensive in the final match of the series, although he did pick up three wickets and England won the match and the series 3–1.

He played in all three of the T20 matches. After not bowling or batting in the first game, he took figures of 2–18 in the second game as England secured a three-run victory. He took 1–29 in the final game which went to a Super Over, with England winning the matches after the scores finished level.

=== 2015/16 South Africa ===
At the urging of coach Jason Gillespie, Rashid signed a deal to play for Adelaide Strikers in the Big Bash in 2015-16 after being left out of the England squad for the tour of South Africa.

Rashid was not selected for the Test series against South Africa, although he did keep his place in the ODI side. After failing to take a wicket in the first game, he finished with figures of 1–43 in the second game which England won by five wickets. After taking 1–45 in the third game, he had his best return of the series in the fourth match. After making 39 with the bat, he took figures of 2–38, although South Africa secured a one wicket victory. In the final match of the series he took figures of 1–59 as South Africa won the match by five wickets to win the series 3–2. England lost both T20 matches, although Rashid performed reasonably well, taking figures of 1–24 in the first game and 1–30 in the second game, although England lost by nine wickets.

=== 2016 T20 World Cup ===
Rashid took figures of 1–20 in the opening game against the West Indies, although it wasn't enough to prevent a defeat. In the second game he picked up figures of 1–35 against South Africa, before taking his best figures of the tournament, 2–18 against Afghanistan. With England needing to beat Sri Lanka to qualify for the semi-finals, Rashid finished with figures of 0–31 as England won by ten runs. He did not pick up a wicket against New Zealand in the semi-final, but turned in a good performance in the final against West Indies, taking figures of 1–23. Despite his good performance, England suffered a narrow loss and finished as runners-up.

=== 2016 Sri Lanka and Pakistan ===
Rashid did not pick up a wicket in the first ODI, although he did bowl economically as the match ended in a tie. He took 2–34 in the second match of the series, which England won by ten wickets. In the rain affected third match, he failed to pick up a wicket, and the match was eventually abandoned. In the fourth ODI he took 2–47 as England won by six wickets. He picked up another two wickets in the final game of the series as England completed a 3–0 series win after winning the match by 122 runs. Rashid played in the only T20I between the two sides, and bowled economically, conceding just 25 runs from his four overs, as England won by eight wickets.

Rashid took figures of 2–51 in the first ODI against Pakistan, as England got off to a winning start. In the second ODI, he took figures of 1–51 as England restricted Pakistan to 251 and won the match by four wickets. In the third match of the series he took figures of 2–73 as England again won to go 3–0 up in the series. In the fourth match he took figures of 3–47 as England won by four wickets. Rashid was rested for the final match, which England lost. He took figures of 1–29 in the only T20I between the two sides, which England lost by nine wickets.

=== 2016 Bangladesh ===
In the first ODI against Bangladesh, Rashid took figures of 4–49 to help England to a 21-run victory. In the second match, he made an unbeaten 33 and took another two wickets, but England lost. In the third match of the series, he took 4–43 as England recorded a four wicket victory to win the series 2–1. In the first Test, Rashid scored 26 with the bat before taking 2–58. He took 1–55 in Bangladesh's second innings as England recorded a 22-run victory. In the second Test, Rashid was wicketless in the first innings but took 4–52 in the second innings. England were unable to chase down their target and lost by 108 runs.

=== 2016–17 India ===
In the first Test against India, Rashid took figures of 4–114 in India's first innings, before taking 3–64 in their second innings. However, England were unable to force a win and the match ended in a draw. Rashid took 2–110 in India's first innings of the second Test, before making an unbeaten 32 with the bat. He continued to bowl well in India's second innings, taking 4–82, although India won the game by 246 runs. In the third Test he took figures of 4–118 in India's first innings, before taking 1–28 as India secured an eight wicket victory. In the fourth Test, he took figures of 4–192 in India's first innings total of 631, as they won by an innings and 36 runs. In the final match of the series, he made 60 in England's first innings before taking figures of 1–153 as India posted 759/7 and won the match to win the series 4–0.

Rashid played in the first ODI against India and took figures of 0–50 as England lost by three wickets. He did not feature in the rest of the series, although he retained his place for the T20Is. In the first T20I he did not bat or bowl as England won by seven wickets. In the second match he took 1–24 but England lost by 5 runs as India levelled the series. In the final match of the series he took figures of 0–23 as India made 202/6 and won by 75 runs.

He was also named as part of the 'Team of the Tournament' at the 2017 Champions Trophy by the ICC, ESPNcricinfo and Cricbuzz.

=== 2017 West Indies and Ireland ===
Rashid took 1–43 in the first ODI against the West Indies as England won by 45 runs. In the second match he took 2–53 as England secured a 4 wicket victory. Rashid made nine with bat as England made 328 in the final ODI, before taking 1–5 with the ball as England won by 186 runs to win the series 3–0. Later in the same year, the West Indies toured England. Rashid's first appearance was in the only T20I, in which he picked up a personal best of 3–25. He continued this good form into the ODI series, taking an economical 2–31 in the first of five, to help restrict the tourists to 204/9. England made light work of the total, as they cruised to a seven wicket victory. Despite the majority of the second ODI being abandoned due to rain, he took 3–34 in the third, while England won by 124 runs. In the final two games, Rashid picked up a solitary wicket in each, although England won both games and celebrated a 4–0 series victory as a consequence.

England started their summer by preparing for the Champions Trophy, which they were hosting for the second time in succession. Preparation began with two ODIs against Ireland. In the first ODI, Rashid picked up a career best of 5–27, as Ireland stumbled to 126 all out. England won the game comfortably; they cruised to a seven wicket victory. In the second ODI, Rashid made a speedy 39 from 25 deliveries, although his bowling proved to be less effective, as he took 1–68. England still managed to win the game by 85 runs, and take a 2–0 series victory.

=== 2018 Australia and India ===
Rashid played in all five ODIs against Australia, taking 12 wickets at an average of 21.50.

In early 2018 Rashid informed Yorkshire of his desire to only play white-ball cricket during the upcoming season, and will not feature in the county championship for the side, preferring to focus on his limited-over career.

Rashid was called up to the England squad to play Test cricket against India in the 2018 series, causing controversy after his decision not to play 4-day county cricket for Yorkshire. In the second Test, he became the first England cricketer for 13 years to complete a Test match without batting, bowling or taking a catch in the field.

=== 2019 West Indies and the Cricket World Cup ===
In England's tour of West Indies in 2019, Rashid was selected in all three squads. He played only one Test, in which his figures were 0–117. In the first ODI he took 3–74, with England winning by 6 wickets. In the second, he took 1–28 in a defeat. In the fourth ODI he took his second ODI five-for, with figures of 5–85 to help England to a 28-run victory.

In April 2019, he was named in England's squad for the 2019 Cricket World Cup. On 21 June 2019, in the match against Sri Lanka, Rashid played in his 150th international match for England.

=== 2020 and 2021 ===
On 29 May 2020, Rashid was named in a 55-man group of players to begin training ahead of international fixtures starting in England following the COVID-19 pandemic. On 9 July 2020, Rashid was included in England's 24-man squad to start training behind closed doors for the ODI series against Ireland. On 27 July 2020, Rashid was named in England's squad for the ODI series. In the second match against Ireland, he became the first spin bowler for England to take 150 wickets in ODIs. In November 2020, in the second fixture against South Africa, Rashid took his 50th wicket in T20I cricket.

In September 2021, Rashid was named in England's squad for the 2021 ICC Men's T20 World Cup.

=== 2023-2024 ===
Rashid was appointed Member of the Order of the British Empire (MBE) in the 2023 Birthday Honours for services to cricket.

In May 2024, he was named in England's squad for the 2024 ICC Men's T20 World Cup tournament.

== Bowling style ==
Rashid uses four different deliveries: the leg break, the top spinner, the googly and the slider.

== Charity work ==
Rashid became an Ambassador for the Overseas Plastic Surgery Appeal charity in November 2018. OPSA are a Yorkshire-based charity that carry out most of their work in the Punjab region of Pakistan.
