= Sunrisers Leeds =

Cricket franchise in Leeds, Yorkshire, UK

Personnel
- Captain: Dani Gibson (women); Zak Crawley (men)
- Coach: Adrian Birrell (women); Daniel Vettori (men)
- Overseas players: Deepti Sharma; Jess Jonassen; Phoebe Litchfield; Annabel Sutherland; (women); Abrar Ahmed; Nathan Ellis; Mitchell Marsh; Ryan Rickelton; (men)
- Owner: Sun Group (Kalanithi Maran)
- Chief executive: Kaviya Maran

Team information
- Colours
- Founded: 2019; 7 years ago
- Home ground: Headingley
- Capacity: 19,567

History
- No. of titles: 1
- Women's title wins: 1 (2025)
The Hundred

Sunrisers Leeds, formerly known as Northern Superchargers, is a franchise 100-ball cricket team based in the English city of Leeds. The team represents the areas of North East England and Yorkshire in The Hundred competition, which first took place during the 2021 English and Welsh cricket season. Both teams play at Headingley Cricket Ground.

== History ==
Logo used for the Northern Superchargers (2019–2025)

By March 2019, it was known that the Headingley-based franchise would represent the counties of Yorkshire and Durham.

In June 2019, reports suggested the England and Wales Cricket Board had applied to trademark "Leeds Superchargers". By August, the name was confirmed as Northern Superchargers, after fears were expressed of alienating fans from the rest of Yorkshire and Durham.

The same month, the team announced that former England Women player Danielle Hazell had been appointed coach of the women's team, while former Australian batsman Darren Lehmann would be the men's team's first coach.

The inaugural Hundred draft took place in October 2019 and saw the Superchargers claim Lauren Winfield-Hill as their headline women's draftee, and Ben Stokes as the men's headliner. They were joined by England internationals Linsey Smith, Adil Rashid and David Willey.

In December 2024, Lisa Keightley was named as the new coach of the women's team, replacing Hazell whose four-year contract had ended.

As part of the 2025 Hundred sale, the ECB gave Yorkshire County Cricket Club a 51% stake in the franchise with the remaining 49% sold in an auction process. Yorkshire County Cricket Club opted to sell their stake, with Sun TV Network Limited acquiring 100% of the franchise. They took operational control on 1 October 2025. In early November, the franchise's name was changed to Sunrisers Leeds.

== Honours ==
=== Men's honours ===
The Hundred

- Third place: 2025, 2026

=== Women's honours ===
The Hundred

- Winners: 2025
- Runners-up: 2023, 2026

== Ground ==
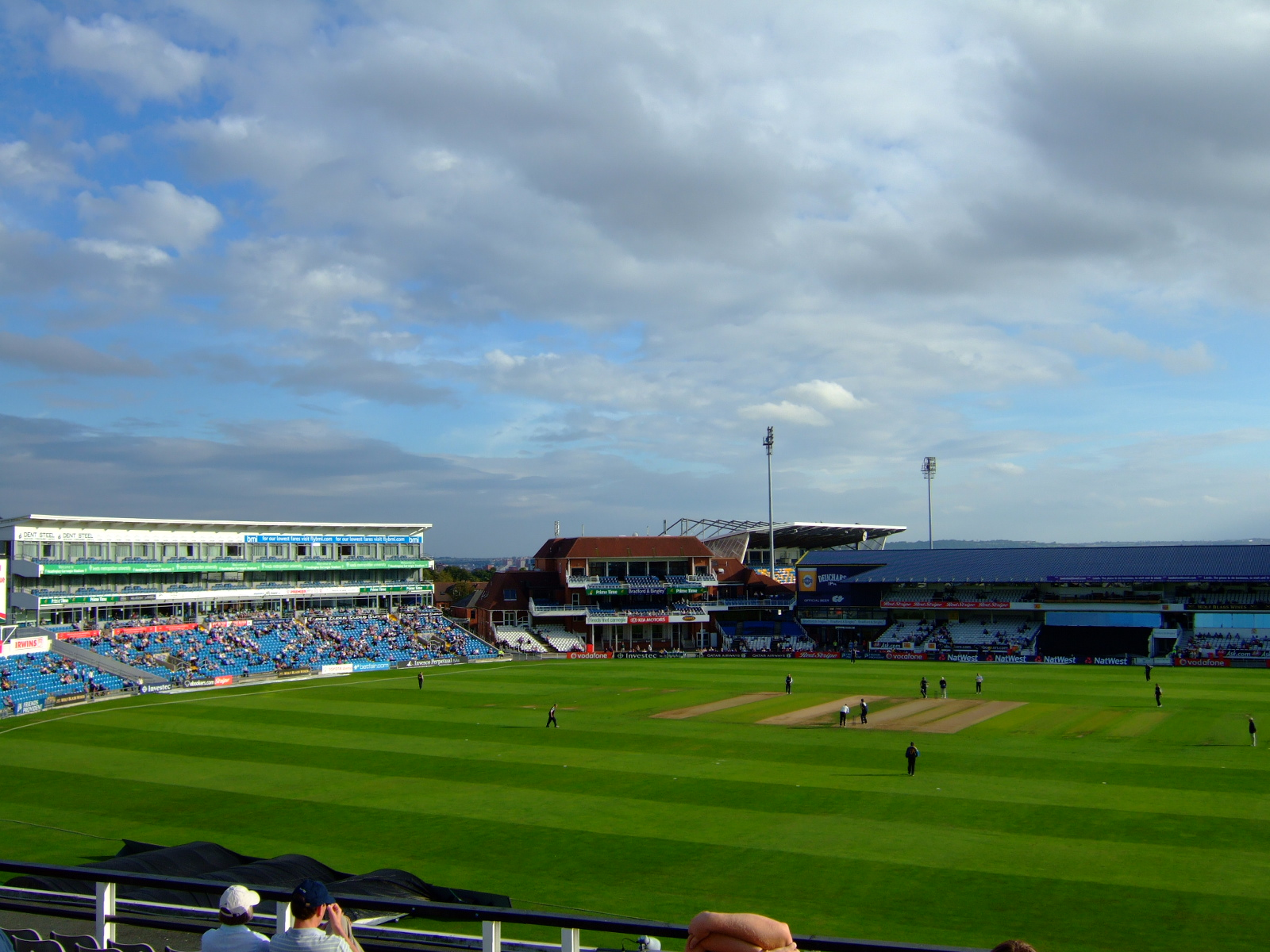
Headingley

Both men's and women's teams play at Headingley Cricket Ground, the home of Yorkshire County Cricket Club in the Headingley area of Leeds. The women's team was originally due to play matches at York Cricket Club and South Northumberland Cricket Club, but the team's matches were brought together at the same ground as a result of the COVID-19 pandemic.

== Current squads ==
- **Bold** denotes players with international caps.
- * denotes a player who is unavailable for rest of the season.

=== Women's team ===
| No. | Name | Nationality | Date of birth (age) | Batting style | Bowling style | Notes |
Batters
| 4 | **Bryony Smith** | England | 12 December 1997 (age 28) | Right-handed | Right-arm off break | |
| 18 | **Phoebe Litchfield** | Australia | 18 April 2003 (age 23) | Left-handed | Right-arm leg break | Overseas player |
| 76 | **Darcey Carter** | Scotland | 31 May 2005 (age 21) | Right-handed | Right-arm off break | Wildcard player |
| — | Tilly Kesteven | England | 30 November 2004 (age 21) | Left-handed | Right-arm leg break | Replacement player |
| — | Flo Miller | England | 26 February 2004 (age 22) | Right-handed | Right-arm medium | Ruled out through injury |
| — | Emily Windsor | England | 14 September 1997 (age 29) | Right-handed | Right-arm medium | Replacement player; Ruled out through injury |
All-rounders
| 6 | **Deepti Sharma** | India | 24 August 1997 (age 29) | Left-handed | Right-arm off break | Overseas player |
| 14 | **Annabel Sutherland** | Australia | 12 October 2001 (age 24) | Right-handed | Right-arm medium | Overseas player |
| 28 | **Dani Gibson** | England | 30 April 2001 (age 25) | Right-handed | Right-arm medium | Captain; England central contract |
Wicket-keepers
| 58 | **Lauren Winfield-Hill** | England | 16 August 1990 (age 36) | Right-handed | — | |
| — | Katie Jones | England | 28 December 2005 (age 20) | Right-handed | — | Replacement player |
| — | Maddie Ward | England | 19 January 2005 (age 21) | Right-handed | Right-arm off break | Ruled out through injury |
Pace bowlers
| 5 | Cassidy McCarthy | England | 23 July 2002 (age 24) | Right-handed | Right-arm medium | |
| 16 | **Kate Cross** | England | 3 October 1991 (age 35) | Right-handed | Right-arm medium | |
| 48 | Sophia Turner | England | 23 April 2003 (age 23) | Right-handed | Right-arm medium | Wildcard player |
| — | **Rachel Slater** | Scotland | 20 November 2001 (age 24) | Right-handed | Left-arm medium | Ruled out through injury |
Spin bowlers
| 3 | **Hannah Baker** | England | 3 February 2004 (age 22) | Right-handed | Right-arm leg break | |
| 11 | Claudie Cooper | England | 1 May 2002 (age 24) | Right-handed | Right-arm off break | |
| 21 | **Jess Jonassen** | Australia | 5 November 1992 (age 33) | Left-handed | Slow left-arm orthodox | Overseas player |
| — | Chloe Skelton | England | 20 June 2001 (age 25) | Right-handed | Right-arm off break | Replacement player |

=== Men's team ===
| No. | Name | Nationality | Date of birth (age) | Batting style | Bowling style | Notes |
Batters
| 16 | **Zak Crawley** | England | 3 February 1998 (age 28) | Right-handed | Right-arm off break | Captain; England central contract |
| 28 | **Dan Lawrence** | England | 12 July 1997 (age 29) | Right-handed | Right-arm off break | |
| 88 | **Harry Brook** | England | 22 February 1999 (age 27) | Right-handed | Right-arm medium | England central contract |
| — | Charlie Allison | England | 2 March 2005 (age 21) | Right-handed | Right-arm medium | Wildcard player |
| — | Graham Clark | England | 16 March 1993 (age 33) | Right-handed | Right-arm leg break | Replacement player |
All-rounders
| 13 | Benny Howell | England | 5 October 1988 (age 38) | Right-handed | Right-arm medium | |
| 17 | **Mitchell Marsh** | Australia | 20 October 1991 (age 34) | Right-handed | Right-arm fast-medium | Overseas player |
| 30 | Ed Barnard | England | 20 November 1995 (age 30) | Right-handed | Right-arm fast-medium | |
| 77 | Matt Revis | England | 15 November 2001 (age 24) | Right-handed | Right-arm fast-medium | Wildcard player |
| — | James Fuller | England | 24 January 1990 (age 36) | Right-handed | Right-arm fast-medium | Replacement player |
Wicket-keepers
| 44 | **Ryan Rickelton** | South Africa | 11 July 1996 (age 30) | Left-handed | Slow left-arm orthodox | Overseas player |
| 45 | Tom Alsop | England | 26 November 1995 (age 30) | Left-handed | Slow left-arm orthodox | Ruled out through injury |
Pace bowlers
| 18 | Tom Lawes | England | 25 December 2002 (age 23) | Right-handed | Right-arm fast-medium | |
| 35 | **Matthew Potts** | England | 29 October 1998 (age 27) | Right-handed | Right-arm fast-medium | England central contract |
| 57 | **Reece Topley** | England | 21 February 1994 (age 32) | Right-handed | Left-arm fast-medium | Ruled out through injury |
| 72 | **Nathan Ellis** | Australia | 22 September 1994 (age 32) | Right-handed | Right-arm fast-medium | Overseas player |
| 99 | **Brydon Carse** | England | 31 July 1995 (age 31) | Right-handed | Right-arm fast-medium | England central contract |
Spin bowlers
| 22 | Liam Patterson-White | England | 8 November 1998 (age 27) | Left-handed | Slow left-arm orthodox | |
| 40 | **Abrar Ahmed** | Pakistan | 11 September 1998 (age 28) | Right-handed | Right-arm leg break | Overseas player |

== Seasons ==
=== Women's team ===
| Season | Group stage | | | | | | | Playoff stage | | Ref. |
| Season | Pld | W | L | T | NR | Pts | Pos | Pld | Pos | Ref. |
|---|---|---|---|---|---|---|---|---|---|---|
| 2021 | 8 | 3 | 4 | 0 | 1 | 7 | 6th | Did not progress | | |
| 2022 | 6 | 3 | 3 | 0 | 0 | 6 | 5th | Did not progress | | |
| 2023 | 8 | 6 | 2 | 0 | 0 | 12 | 2nd | 2 (Note: Northern Superchargers women qualified for the playoffs in 2023. In the eliminator against Welsh Fire, rain caused the game to be abandoned after the first innings. As Northern Superchargers had finished in 2nd, they progressed to the final due to a better finishing position in the group stage. In the final the team played Southern Brave, losing by 34 runs.) | 2nd | |
| 2024 | 8 | 3 | 3 | 1 | 1 | 8 | 4th | Did not progress | | |
| 2025 | 8 | 6 | 2 | 0 | 0 | 24 | 2nd | 2 (Note: Northern Superchargers women qualified for the playoffs in 2025. They won the eliminator against London Spirit, by 42 runs. In the final, they defeated Southern Brave, by 7 wickets.) | 1st | |
| 2026 | 8 | 5 | 3 | 0 | 0 | 20 | 2nd | 2 (Note: Sunrisers Leeds women qualified for the playoffs in 2026. They won the eliminator against Southern Brave, by 5 wickets. In the final, the team played Trent Rockets, losing by 8 wickets.) | 2nd | |

=== Men's team ===
| Season | Group stage | | | | | | | Playoff stage | | Ref. |
| Season | Pld | W | L | T | NR | Pts | Pos | Pld | Pos | Ref. |
|---|---|---|---|---|---|---|---|---|---|---|
| 2021 | 8 | 3 | 4 | 0 | 1 | 7 | 5th | Did not progress | | |
| 2022 | 8 | 4 | 4 | 0 | 0 | 8 | 6th | Did not progress | | |
| 2023 | 8 | 2 | 5 | 0 | 1 | 5 | 8th | Did not progress | | |
| 2024 | 8 | 5 | 2 | 0 | 1 | 11 | 4th | Did not progress | | |
| 2025 | 8 | 5 | 3 | 0 | 0 | 20 | 3rd | 1 (Note: Northern Superchargers men qualified for the playoffs in 2025. In the eliminator against Trent Rockets, rain caused the game to be abandoned due to rain. As Trent Rockets had finished in 2nd, they progressed to the final due to a better finishing position in the group stage.) | 3rd | |
| 2026 | 8 | 5 | 3 | 0 | 0 | 20 | 3rd | 1 (Note: Sunrisers Leeds men qualified for the playoffs in 2026. They played 1 game, losing the eliminator to Manchester Super Giants by 20 runs.) | 3rd | |

== See also ==
- List of Sunrisers Leeds cricketers
- List of cricket grounds in England and Wales
- List of Test cricket grounds
