= Pakistani cricket team in England and Ireland in 2016 =

International cricket tour

The Pakistan national cricket team toured England, Wales and Ireland from 3 July to 7 September 2016 for a four-match Test series, a five-match One Day International (ODI) series and a one-off Twenty20 International (T20I) against the England cricket team. They also played two three-day matches against Somerset and Sussex prior to the Test series, a two-day match against Worcestershire during the Test series, and two ODI matches against Ireland prior to the ODI series.

England's ODI matches against Pakistan was the first to trial a system where the TV umpire calls the front-foot no-ball, instead of the on-field umpire. During the third ODI match of the series, England set a new record team total when they scored 444 runs, with Alex Hales setting a new individual total for an England batsman when he scored 171.

The Test series was drawn 2–2, England won the ODI series 4–1, and Pakistan won the one-off T20I match by 9 wickets. The fixtures formed part of a points-based scoring system, which was introduced in their series against Sri Lanka in May 2016. England won the Super Series 16–12.

== England ==
Pakistan in England in 2016
	England	Pakistan
- Dates: 3 July – 7 September 2016
Captains	Alastair Cook (Tests); Eoin Morgan (ODIs and T20Is)	Misbah-ul-Haq (Tests); Azhar Ali (ODIs); Sarfaraz Ahmed (T20Is)

Test series
- Result: 4-match series drawn 2–2
Most runs	Joe Root (512)	Younis Khan (340)
Most wickets	Chris Woakes (26)	Yasir Shah (19)
- Player of the series: Chris Woakes (Eng); Misbah-ul-Haq (Pak)

One Day International series
- Results: England won the 5-match series 4–1
Most runs	Joe Root (274)	Sarfaraz Ahmed (300)
Most wickets	Chris Woakes (9)	Hasan Ali (8)
- Player of the series: Joe Root (Eng)

Twenty20 International series
- Results: Pakistan won the 1-match series 1–0
Most runs	Alex Hales (37)	Khalid Latif (59)
Most wickets	Wahab Riaz (3)	Adil Rashid (1)

Super Series points
- England 16, Pakistan 12

=== Squads ===
Tests		ODIs		T20Is	
England	Pakistan	England	Pakistan	England	Pakistan
Alastair Cook (c); Moeen Ali; James Anderson; Jonny Bairstow (wk); Jake Ball; Gary Ballance; Stuart Broad; Steven Finn; Alex Hales; Adil Rashid; Toby Roland-Jones^{†}; Joe Root (vc); Ben Stokes; James Vince; Chris Woakes	Misbah-ul-Haq (c); Iftikhar Ahmed; Sarfaraz Ahmed (wk); Azhar Ali; Rahat Ali; Mohammad Amir; Sami Aslam; Zulfiqar Babar; Mohammad Hafeez; Imran Khan; Sohail Khan; Younis Khan; Shan Masood; Wahab Riaz; Mohammad Rizwan (wk); Asad Shafiq; Yasir Shah	Eoin Morgan (c); Moeen Ali; Jonny Bairstow; Jake Ball; Jos Buttler (wk); Liam Dawson; Chris Jordan; Alex Hales; Liam Plunkett; Adil Rashid; Joe Root; Jason Roy (vc); Ben Stokes; David Willey; Chris Woakes; Mark Wood	Azhar Ali (c); Sarfaraz Ahmed; Hasan Ali; Mohammad Amir; Sami Aslam; Babar Azam; Umar Gul; Mohammad Hafeez; Sharjeel Khan; Shoaib Malik; Mohammad Nawaz; Wahab Riaz; Mohammad Rizwan (wk); Yasir Shah; Imad Wasim	Eoin Morgan (c); Moeen Ali; Sam Billings; Jos Buttler (wk); Chris Jordan; Alex Hales; Tymal Mills; Liam Plunkett; Adil Rashid; Joe Root; Jason Roy (vc); Ben Stokes; David Willey; Mark Wood	Sarfaraz Ahmed (c); Hasan Ali; Mohammad Amir; Babar Azam; Amad Butt; ~~Mohammad Irfan~~; Sharjeel Khan; Khalid Latif; Shoaib Malik; Mohammad Nawaz; Wahab Riaz; Mohammad Rizwan; Sohail Tanvir; Imad Wasim

^{†} Toby Roland-Jones was dropped from the England Test squad after James Anderson and Ben Stokes were recalled for the 2nd Test. David Willey was initially ruled out of the ODI series after suffering an injury in the final of the 2016 NatWest t20 Blast, with Jake Ball named as his replacement. However, Willey's injury was not as serious as first thought, with him rejoining the squad, with Ball also retaining his place. Mohammad Irfan was ruled out of the T20I squad and was replaced by Hasan Ali.

== Tour matches ==
=== First-class: Somerset vs Pakistanis ===
3–5 July 2016
Scorecard

Pakistanis	v	Somerset
359/8d (100 overs); Younis Khan 104 (177); Paul van Meekeren 3/78 (26 overs)		128 (34.1 overs); James Hildreth 47* (68); Sohail Khan 3/26 (10 overs)
236/4d (59.4 overs); Azhar Ali 101* (168); Jack Leach 2/61 (18 overs)		258/8 (73 overs); Marcus Trescothick 106 (111); Yasir Shah 4/107 (32 overs)

Match drawn
County Ground, Taunton
Umpires: Tom Lungley (Eng) and Billy Taylor (Eng)

- Pakistanis won the toss and elected to bat.
- Dominic Bess and Adam Hose (both Somerset) made their first-class debuts.

=== First-class: Sussex vs Pakistanis ===
8–10 July 2016
Scorecard

Pakistanis	v	Sussex
363/5d (99 overs); Azhar Ali 145 (266); Jofra Archer 4/49 (22 overs)		291/5d (63.5 overs); Harry Finch 103 (140); Imran Khan 2/60 (13 overs)
71/1 (24 overs); Shan Masood 38* (42); Jofra Archer 1/24 (9 overs)

Match drawn
County Ground, Hove
Umpires: Jeff Evans (Eng) and Russell Warren (Eng)

- Sussex won the toss and elected to field.
- No play was possible on day 3 due to rain.
- Jofra Archer and Philip Salt (both Sussex) made their first-class debuts.

=== Two-day: Worcestershire vs Pakistanis ===
29–30 July 2016
Scorecard

Pakistanis	v	Worcestershire
261/3d (80 overs); Azhar Ali 81 (140); Ed Barnard 1/30 (15 overs)		260/6 (76 overs); Tom Kohler-Cadmore 73 (113); Rahat Ali 2/29 (11 overs)

Match drawn
New Road, Worcester
Umpires: Martin Saggers (Eng) and Chris Watts (Eng)

- Worcestershire won the toss and elected to field.

== Test series ==
=== 1st Test ===
14–18 July 2016
Scorecard

Pakistan	v	England
339 (99.1 overs); Misbah-ul-Haq 114 (199); Chris Woakes 6/70 (24 overs)		272 (79.1 overs); Alastair Cook 81 (124); Yasir Shah 6/72 (29 overs)
215 (79.1 overs); Asad Shafiq 49 (96); Chris Woakes 5/32 (17 overs)		207 (75.5 overs); Jonny Bairstow 48 (147); Yasir Shah 4/69 (31 overs)

Pakistan won by 75 runs
Lord's, London
Umpires: Kumar Dharmasena (SL) and Joel Wilson (WI)
Player of the match: Yasir Shah (Pak)

- Pakistan won the toss and elected to bat.
- Jake Ball (Eng) made his Test debut.
- Misbah-ul-Haq (Pak) became the oldest captain to score a Test century.
- Yasir Shah (Pak) became the first leg-spinner to take a five-wicket haul at Lord's since 1996 and the only Asian player to take a 10-wicket match haul at Lord's.
- Chris Woakes (Eng) took his maiden 10-wicket match haul.
- Stuart Broad (Eng) took his 350th Test wicket.
- This was Pakistan's first win in a Test match against England at Lord's in 20 years, their fourth overall and most by any Asian team.
- Points: Pakistan 4, England 0.

=== 2nd Test ===
22–26 July 2016
Scorecard

England	v	Pakistan
589/8d (152.2 overs); Joe Root 254 (406); Wahab Riaz 3/106 (26.2 overs)		198 (63.4 overs); Misbah-ul-Haq 52 (114); Chris Woakes 4/67 (16 overs)
173/1d (30 overs); Alastair Cook 76* (78); Mohammad Amir 1/43 (11 overs)		234 (70.3 overs); Mohammad Hafeez 42 (72); Chris Woakes 3/41 (15.3 overs)

England won by 330 runs
Old Trafford, Manchester
Umpires: Kumar Dharmasena (SL) and Rod Tucker (Aus)
Player of the match: Joe Root (Eng)

- England won the toss and elected to bat.
- Alastair Cook (Eng) played his 50th Test as captain.
- Joe Root (Eng) made his highest score in a Test match, surpassing his previous best of 200 not out.
- Points: England 4, Pakistan 0.

=== 3rd Test ===
3–7 August 2016
Scorecard

England	v	Pakistan
297 (86 overs); Gary Ballance 70 (150); Sohail Khan 5/96 (23 overs)		400 (136 overs); Azhar Ali 139 (293); Chris Woakes 3/79 (30 overs)
445/6d (129 overs); Moeen Ali 86* (96); Mohammad Amir 2/75 (31 overs)		201 (70.5 overs); Sami Aslam 70 (167); Stuart Broad 2/24 (15 overs)

England won by 141 runs
Edgbaston, Birmingham
Umpires: Bruce Oxenford (Aus) and Joel Wilson (WI)
Player of the match: Moeen Ali (Eng)

- Pakistan won the toss and elected to field.
- This was England's 500th Test match at home.
- Sohail Khan (Pak) took his first five-wicket haul in Tests.
- Points: England 4, Pakistan 0.

=== 4th Test ===
11–15 August 2016
Scorecard

England	v	Pakistan
328 (76.4 overs); Moeen Ali 108 (152); Sohail Khan 5/68 (20.4 overs)		542 (146 overs); Younis Khan 218 (308); Chris Woakes 3/82 (30 overs)
253 (79.2 overs); Jonny Bairstow 81 (127); Yasir Shah 5/71 (29 overs)		42/0 (13.1 overs); Azhar Ali 30* (28)

Pakistan won by 10 wickets
The Oval, London
Umpires: Marais Erasmus (SA) and Bruce Oxenford (Aus)
Player of the match: Younis Khan (Pak)

- England won the toss and elected to bat.
- Iftikhar Ahmed (Pak) made his Test debut.
- Wahab Riaz (Pak) took his 50th Test wicket when he dismissed James Vince.
- Joe Root (Eng) passed 4,000 Test runs.
- Points: Pakistan 4, England 0.

== ODI series ==
=== 1st ODI ===
24 August 2016 (D/N)
Scorecard

Pakistan; 260/6 (50 overs)	v	England; 194/3 (34.3 overs)
Azhar Ali 82 (110); Adil Rashid 2/51 (9 overs)		Jason Roy 65 (56); Mohammad Nawaz 1/31 (6.3 overs)

England won by 44 runs (DLS method)
Rose Bowl, Southampton
Umpires: Rob Bailey (Eng) and Simon Fry (Aus)
Player of the match: Jason Roy (Eng)

- Pakistan won the toss and elected to bat.
- Rain stopped play after 34 overs of England's innings. The target was revised from 261 to 252 from 48 overs. Rain stopped play again after 34.3 overs of England's innings and the match was called off with no further play available. The par score for England after 34.3 overs was 150 runs.
- Points: England 2, Pakistan 0.

=== 2nd ODI ===
27 August 2016
Scorecard

Pakistan; 251 (49.5 overs)	v	England; 255/6 (47.3 overs)
Sarfaraz Ahmed 105 (130); Chris Woakes 3/42 (9.5 overs)		Joe Root 89 (108); Imad Wasim 2/38 (7 overs)

England won by 4 wickets
Lord's, London
Umpires: Marais Erasmus (SA) and Tim Robinson (Eng)
Player of the match: Joe Root (Eng)

- Pakistan won the toss and elected to bat.
- Sarfaraz Ahmed became the first player for Pakistan to score a century at Lord's in an ODI.
- Points: England 2, Pakistan 0.

=== 3rd ODI ===
30 August 2016 (D/N)
Scorecard

England; 444/3 (50 overs)	v	Pakistan; 275 (42.4 overs)
Alex Hales 171 (122); Hasan Ali 2/74 (10 overs)		Mohammad Amir 58 (28); Chris Woakes 4/41 (5.4 overs)

England won by 169 runs
Trent Bridge, Nottingham
Umpires: Simon Fry (Aus) and Richard Kettleborough (Eng)
Player of the match: Alex Hales (Eng)

- England won the toss and elected to bat.
- England scored the highest innings total in ODI cricket.
- Alex Hales made the highest total for an England batsman in ODIs.
- Jos Buttler scored the fastest 50 in ODIs for an England batsman.
- Wahab Riaz's bowling figures of 0/110 are the second worst in ODIs and the worst by a Pakistani bowler.
- Mohammad Amir's (Pak) score of 58 is the highest score made by a number 11 in an ODI.
- Points: England 2, Pakistan 0.

=== 4th ODI ===
1 September 2016 (D/N)
Scorecard

Pakistan; 247/8 (50 overs)	v	England; 252/6 (48 overs)
Azhar Ali 80 (104); Adil Rashid 3/47 (10 overs)		Ben Stokes 69 (70); Mohammad Irfan 2/26 (5 overs)

England won by 4 wickets
Headingley, Leeds
Umpires: Marais Erasmus (SA) and Tim Robinson (Eng)
Player of the match: Jonny Bairstow (Eng)

- Pakistan won the toss and elected to bat.
- Joe Root became the quickest player for England to pass 3,000 runs in ODIs.
- Eoin Morgan (Eng) passed 5,000 ODI runs.
- Points: England 2, Pakistan 0.

=== 5th ODI ===
4 September 2016
Scorecard

England; 302/9 (50 overs)	v	Pakistan; 304/6 (48.2 overs)
Jason Roy 87 (89); Hasan Ali 4/60 (10 overs)		Sarfaraz Ahmed 90 (73); Mark Wood 2/56 (10 overs)

Pakistan won by 4 wickets
Sophia Gardens, Cardiff
Umpires: Rob Bailey (Eng) and Simon Fry (Aus)
Player of the match: Sarfaraz Ahmed (Pak)

- Pakistan won the toss and elected to field.
- Liam Dawson (Eng) made his ODI debut.
- This was Pakistan's highest successful run chase outside of Asia in an ODI.
- Sarfaraz Ahmed (Pak) scored the most runs by a Pakistan wicket-keeper in any ODI series.
- Points: Pakistan 2, England 0.

== T20I series ==
=== Only T20I ===
7 September 2016
Scorecard

England; 135/7 (20 overs)	v	Pakistan; 139/1 (14.5 overs)
Alex Hales 37 (26); Wahab Riaz 3/18 (4 overs)		Khalid Latif 59* (42); Adil Rashid 1/29 (4 overs)

Pakistan won by 9 wickets
Old Trafford, Manchester
Umpires: Michael Gough (Eng) and Tim Robinson (Eng)
Player of the match: Wahab Riaz (Pak)

- England won the toss and elected to bat.
- Sarfaraz Ahmed (Pak) stood as captain for the first time in a T20I.
- Babar Azam and Hasan Ali (Pak) both made their T20I debuts.
- This was Pakistan's biggest T20I win in terms of wickets.
- Points: Pakistan 2, England 0.

== Ireland ==
Pakistan in Ireland in 2016
	Ireland	Pakistan
- Dates: 18 August – 20 August 2016
Captains	William Porterfield	Azhar Ali

One Day International series
- Results: Pakistan won the 2-match series 1–0
Most runs	Gary Wilson (21)	Sharjeel Khan (152)
Most wickets	Barry McCarthy (4)	Imad Wasim (5)
- Player of the series: Sharjeel Khan (Pak)

=== Squads ===
ODIs
Ireland	Pakistan
William Porterfield (c); John Anderson; Peter Chase; Ed Joyce; Tim Murtagh; Andrew McBrine; Barry McCarthy; Kevin O'Brien; Niall O'Brien (wk); Stuart Poynter; Paul Stirling; Gary Wilson; Craig Young	Azhar Ali (c); Sarfaraz Ahmed (wk); Hasan Ali; Mohammad Amir; Sami Aslam; Babar Azam; Umar Gul; Mohammad Hafeez; Sharjeel Khan; Shoaib Malik; Mohammad Nawaz; Wahab Riaz; Mohammad Rizwan (wk); Yasir Shah; Imad Wasim

=== ODI series ===
==== 1st ODI ====
18 August 2016
Scorecard

Pakistan; 337/6 (47 overs)	v	Ireland; 82 (23.4 overs)
Sharjeel Khan 152 (86); Barry McCarthy 4/62 (10 overs)		Gary Wilson 21 (33); Imad Wasim 5/14 (5.4 overs)

Pakistan won by 255 runs
Malahide Cricket Club Ground, Dublin
Umpires: Simon Fry (Aus) and Mark Hawthorne (Ire)

- Ireland won the toss and elected to field.
- The start of the match was delayed due to a wet outfield, with the match reduced to 47 overs per side.
- Hasan Ali and Mohammad Nawaz (Pak) both made their ODI debuts.
- Sharjeel Khan (Pak) scored his maiden ODI century.
- This was Pakistan's biggest win in terms of runs in an ODI.
- This was Ireland's lowest score in an ODI at home and their second lowest total in all ODIs.

==== 2nd ODI ====
20 August 2016
Scorecard

Ireland	v	Pakistan

Match abandoned without a ball bowled
Malahide Cricket Club Ground, Dublin
Umpires: Marais Erasmus (SA) and Mark Hawthorne (Ire)

- No toss.
- The match was abandoned without a ball bowled due to rain.
