= Irish cricket team in England in 2019 =

International cricket tour

	England	Ireland
- Dates: 18 – 27 July 2019
Captains	Joe Root	William Porterfield

Test series
- Result: England won the 1-match series 1–0
Most runs	Jack Leach (93)	Andrew Balbirnie (60)
Most wickets	Stuart Broad (7)	Mark Adair (6); Tim Murtagh (6)

The Ireland cricket team toured England in July 2019 to play a one-off four-day Test match at Lord's. It was the first ever Test match between the two sides, and England's first four-day Test match since they toured New Zealand in 1970–71. It was Ireland's third Test match, and their twelfth international fixture against England.

The Test match was part of England's preparations for the 2019 Ashes series. Ahead of the Test, the England cricket team visited Ireland in May to play a one-off One Day International (ODI) match. Ireland also played a two-day warm-up match against a Middlesex 2nd XI side at the Merchant Taylors' School Ground in Northwood.

England won the one-off Test match by 143 runs, with Ireland being bowled out for 38 runs in their second innings.

== Squads ==
Test
England	Ireland
Joe Root (c); Moeen Ali; ~~James Anderson~~; Jonny Bairstow (wk); Stuart Broad; Rory Burns; Sam Curran; Joe Denly; Lewis Gregory; Jack Leach; Jason Roy; Olly Stone; Chris Woakes	William Porterfield (c); Mark Adair; Andrew Balbirnie; Andrew McBrine; James McCollum; Tim Murtagh; Kevin O'Brien; Boyd Rankin; Simi Singh; Paul Stirling; Stuart Thompson; Lorcan Tucker; Gary Wilson (wk); Craig Young

Ahead of the one-off Test, James Anderson was ruled out of England's squad with a calf injury.

== Tour match ==
=== Two-day match: Middlesex 2nd XI vs Ireland ===
18–19 July 2019
Scorecard

Middlesex 2nd XI	v	Ireland
290/9d (76 overs); Joe Cracknell 105* (128); Craig Young 4/29 (16 overs)		91/3 (28.1 overs); James McCollum 41 (73); Andrew Rishton 1/31 (9 overs)

Match drawn
Merchant Taylors' School Ground, Northwood
Umpires: Nick Hall (Eng) and Vinoj Srinivasan (Eng)

- Toss uncontested, Middlesex 2nd XI elected to bat first.
- Only 28.1 overs were possible on Day 2 due to rain.

== Only Test ==
=== Match details ===
24–27 July 2019 (Note: While four days of play were scheduled for the one-off Test, the match reached a result in three days.)
Scorecard

England	v	Ireland
85 (23.4 overs); Joe Denly 23 (28); Tim Murtagh 5/13 (9 overs)		207 (58.2 overs); Andrew Balbirnie 55 (69); Sam Curran 3/28 (10 overs)
303 (77.5 overs); Jack Leach 92 (162); Stuart Thompson 3/44 (12.5 overs)		38 (15.4 overs); James McCollum 11 (17); Chris Woakes 6/17 (7.4 overs)

England won by 143 runs
Lord's, London
Umpires: Aleem Dar (Pak) and Ruchira Palliyaguruge (SL)
Player of the match: Jack Leach (Eng)

- England won the toss and elected to bat.
- Jason Roy, Olly Stone (Eng) and Mark Adair (Ire) all made their Test debuts.
- Boyd Rankin (Ire) became the first cricketer since the Nawab of Pataudi in 1946 to play for and against England in Tests.
- Tim Murtagh took the first five-wicket haul by a bowler for Ireland in Tests.
- England's first innings was their shortest in a Test match at home, in terms of overs.
- Jonny Bairstow (Eng) and Gary Wilson (Ire) failed to score any runs in the match. It was the first instance of both designated wicket-keepers being dismissed for a pair in a completed Test.
- Ireland's second innings total was the lowest in Tests at Lord's, the seventh-lowest in Test cricket, and the lowest since South Africa were dismissed for 36 runs in the first innings of the fifth Test in Melbourne in 1932.

=== Summary ===
The Test match, which was seen as a warm-up for the upcoming Ashes for the England team, was an historical occasion for the Ireland team, played out at Lord's. For England, Test debutants Olly Stone and Jason Roy, the latter who was part of the World Cup winning team, were among the players looking to find a place in the lineup for the Ashes series. Ireland's team, which was playing in just its third Test since achieving Test status in 2017, saw the debut of fast bowler Mark Adair.

Faced with a flat, green pitch, which was expected to offer some assistance to the bowlers in the first few hours but then leave batting as a more straightforward affair, England won the toss and elected to bat. Things started to go wrong almost immediately, with Jason Roy out for five, caught on an edge to Paul Stirling at first slip, off a ball by Tim Murtagh, in the third over. Incoming Joe Denly managed to hold on to score 23 runs before being dismissed leg before wicket to Mark Adair, bringing the England total to 36 for two. at which point England lost six wickets for seven runs to end up at 43 for seven, four batsmen falling to Tim Murtagh, who became the first Irish player to get a five-wicket haul in Test cricket. Sam Curran and Olly Stone added some runs to the total, but the latter was bowled out by Adair for the final wicket, with England all out for 85 before lunch in just 23.4 overs, beating the previous 19th century Lord's record and marking the fourth time in the last three years that England lost ten wickets in a single session.

Resuming after lunch, as the surface began to improve, Ireland's openers brought the total to 45 for two before the partnership of Paul Stirling and Andrew Balbirnie brought Ireland's lead to 42 at tea, thanks in part to a rapid half century by Balbirnie. Good spells by Stuart Broad and Olly Stone, who each took three wickets after the interval, allowed England to remain in the game, with Ireland losing five wickets for just 17 runs and falling to 149 for seven. After the end of the pace bowlers' spells, however, Ireland's tail managed to recover and extended the lead to over a hundred thanks to efforts by Kevin O'Brien and Murtagh, to bring a first-innings total of 207 for Ireland.

With one over left in the first day's play, Jack Leach opened England's batting as nightwatchman, surviving the uneventful final over in what was a "bizarre day of Test cricket", which witnessed the fall of 20 wickets. The following morning saw the wicket of Rory Burns fall early, but a 145-run second wicket partnership between Leach and Jason Roy suggested that England might be able to set an intimidating second innings total for Ireland. However, after the fall of Roy's wicket, the only batsmen beside Leach to reach a half-century, Leach ended up eight runs short of becoming the first England nightwatchman to score a century, falling prey to the nervous nineties after batting for more than four hours. He joined Alex Tudor, Harold Larwood, Eddie Hemmings and Jack Russell in getting within ten runs of the milestone. England lost a further seven wickets for 77 runs, before play was interrupted early in the evening because of thunder and lightning. This left England on 303 for nine at the close, with Ireland having a chance of achieving an upset going into the third day. England's last wicket fell on the first ball of the following morning, leaving a target of 182 to win for Ireland.

Stuart Broad and Chris Woakes then opened the bowling for England, with Woakes getting an early breakthrough by dismissing the Ireland captain William Porterfield on the last ball of the fourth over. Things went downhill for Ireland from there, Broad and Woakes combining to take all ten wickets between them, with Woakes finishing six wickets for seventeen runs, taking his third five-wicket haul at Lord's. Despite interruptions due to the inclement weather, Ireland ended up being bowled out for 38 before the end of the morning session, lasting only 15.4 overs, the seventh-lowest total in a Test match innings. Jack Leach was named the man of the match, after his 92 runs in the second innings. Initially this was not enough to secure a spot in the first Test of the Ashes, however, he was named in the squad for the second Test, after Moeen Ali was dropped.

=== Aftermath ===
Despite the victory, England captain Joe Root later lashed out at the "substandard pitch" which did not come "even close to a fair contest between bat and ball throughout the whole game", and might have been a contributing factor to the low scores achieved, combined with similarly substandard batting displays by both sides. For his five-wicket haul in the first innings, Tim Murtagh's name was added to the Away Team Honours Board.
