= Irish cricket team in England in 2020 =

International cricket tour

	England	Ireland
- Dates: 30 July – 4 August 2020
Captains	Eoin Morgan	Andrew Balbirnie

One Day International series
- Results: England won the 3-match series 2–1
Most runs	Eoin Morgan (142)	Paul Stirling (156)
Most wickets	David Willey (8)	Craig Young (6)
- Player of the series: David Willey (Eng)

The Ireland cricket team toured England in July and August 2020 to play three One Day International (ODI) matches. Originally due to take place in September 2020, the schedule for the series was rearranged due to the COVID-19 pandemic. All of the fixtures were played behind closed doors, at the Rose Bowl in Southampton, due to the pandemic. The teams last faced each other in a one-off ODI in Dublin in May 2019, with England winning by four wickets.

The ODI matches formed part of the inaugural 2020–2023 ICC Cricket World Cup Super League, and they were the first matches of the league. Following a trial that started in December 2019, the International Cricket Council (ICC) announced the use of technology to monitor front-foot no-balls for all matches in the Super League. The third umpire called the front-foot no-balls, communicating this with the on-field umpires.

England won the first two ODI matches to take an unassailable series lead. England won the series 2–1, after Ireland won the third and final match of the series. It was Ireland's first win in an ODI against England in England.

== Background ==
In April 2020, Cricket Ireland's chief executive, Warren Deutrom, said that Ireland will be "very flexible" with regard to possibly rescheduling the fixtures due to the COVID-19 pandemic. This included the possibility of playing all three matches behind closed doors, at a venue with enough capacity for all the stakeholders, such as Old Trafford or the Rose Bowl. In May 2020, Cricket Ireland were asked if they could move the fixtures to the end of July, to accommodate the rescheduling of England's fixtures against Australia. Later the same month, Cricket Ireland confirmed that the scheduling for the matches was still under active discussion, despite the cancellation of their home fixtures against New Zealand and Pakistan.

On 21 May 2020, a revised schedule due to the pandemic was issued, with all three matches taking place at Old Trafford, starting on 30 July 2020. However, the venue was later changed to the Rose Bowl in Southampton. The series was originally scheduled to take place in September 2020, at Trent Bridge, Edgbaston and The Oval. A week later, the UK government published updated guidance on the resumption of training for elite sports. On 29 May 2020, the England and Wales Cricket Board (ECB) named a 55-man group of players to begin training ahead of international fixtures starting in England. On 8 June 2020, Cricket Ireland confirmed that centrally-contracted players would return to training, and that they were still in discussions with the ECB with regard to playing the three matches. Ireland's captain, Andy Balbirnie, said he was hopeful that the series would go ahead, after a "very reassuring" briefing from the ECB. Gary Wilson, Ireland's wicket-keeper, said that "games against England are massive for us" and everyone is "desperate" for the series to go ahead. On 6 July 2020, the ECB gave the go ahead for the series, and confirmed the fixture schedule.

On 17 June 2020, the ECB trimmed the 55-man squad down to a 30-man squad to prepare for the Test matches against the West Indies. On 4 July 2020, England named a thirteen-man squad for the first Test, along with nine reserve players. Some of the cricketers not selected for the Test matches from the initial 30-man squad began preparing for the ODI matches against Ireland. On 9 July 2020, the ECB named a 24-man squad to begin training behind closed doors in preparation for the ODI matches. The next day, Cricket Ireland named a squad of twenty-one players to travel to England. Following the practice matches, fourteen of them will be selected for the ODI squad, with the rest staying in England as cover. On 18 July 2020, Cricket Ireland added Stuart Thompson to their touring squad, ahead of the team's departure from Dublin. On 21 July 2020, the ECB named Moeen Ali as England's vice-captain for the ODI series. On 21 July 2020, Matt Parkinson withdrew from England's 24-man squad, after he suffered an ankle injury.

In June 2020, the International Cricket Council (ICC) made several interim changes to the Playing Conditions due to the pandemic. Players were banned from using saliva to shine the ball, with five penalty runs being awarded to the opposition for repeated transgressions. The requirement to use neutral match officials was temporarily lifted, along with an increase to the number of DRS reviews a team can use, due to having less experienced umpires in a match.

== Squads ==
ODIs
England	Ireland
Eoin Morgan (c); Moeen Ali (vc); Jonny Bairstow (wk); Tom Banton; Sam Billings; Tom Curran; Liam Dawson; ~~Joe Denly~~; Liam Livingstone; Saqib Mahmood; Adil Rashid; Jason Roy; Reece Topley; James Vince; David Willey	Andrew Balbirnie (c); Paul Stirling (vc); Mark Adair; Curtis Campher; Peter Chase; Gareth Delany; George Dockrell; Josh Little; Andy McBrine; Barry McCarthy; Kevin O'Brien; William Porterfield; Boyd Rankin; Simi Singh; Harry Tector; Lorcan Tucker (wk); Craig Young

The ECB named Richard Gleeson, Lewis Gregory and Liam Livingstone as reserve players for the series. Joe Denly was ruled out of England's squad, after suffering from back spasms before the first match. Liam Livingstone replaced Denly in the squad for the remaining fixtures. Ahead of the second ODI, Ireland named Peter Chase and George Dockrell in their squad, replacing Boyd Rankin and Barry McCarthy respectively, after they were both ruled out due to injuries. On the morning of the third and final match, Mark Adair was added to Ireland's squad.

== Practice matches ==
Before the ODI series, Ireland played two practice matches, with the second match against the England Lions. The twenty-four cricketers named in England's training squad also played two intra-squad practice matches. All four games took place at the Rose Bowl.

21 July 2020
11:00
Scorecard

Team Moeen; 325/9 (40 overs)	v	Team Morgan; 225 (32.3 overs)
Jonny Bairstow 127 (88); Adil Rashid 4/65 (7 overs)		Ben Duckett 68 (65); Moeen Ali 3/40 (6.3 overs)

Team Moeen won by 100 runs
Rose Bowl, Southampton
Umpires: Mike Burns (Eng) and David Millns (Eng)

- Toss uncontested, Team Moeen elected to bat first.
- The match was reduced to 40 overs per side.

22 July 2020
14:00 (D/N)
Scorecard

Ireland; 307/6 (50 overs)	v	Ireland Wolves; 310/7 (48.2 overs)
William Porterfield 57 (58); Barry McCarthy 2/30 (8 overs)		Kevin O'Brien 126* (128); Craig Young 3/69 (9.2 overs)

Ireland Wolves won by 3 wickets
Rose Bowl, Southampton
Umpires: Mike Burns (Eng) and Martin Saggers (Eng)

- Ireland won the toss and elected to bat.

24 July 2020
14:00 (D/N)
Scorecard

Team Moeen; 108 (28.4 overs)	v	Team Vince; 109/4 (17.4 overs)
Phil Salt 25 (37); Liam Dawson 4/21 (5.4 overs)		Tom Banton 57* (56); David Willey 2/18 (4 overs)

Team Vince won by 6 wickets
Rose Bowl, Southampton
Umpires: Mike Burns (Eng) and Martin Saggers (Eng)

- Toss uncontested, Team Moeen elected to bat first.
- The match was reduced to 40 overs per side.
- Phil Salt (Team Moeen) batted twice to make up the numbers.

26 July 2020
14:00 (D/N)
Scorecard

Ireland; 296 (49.4 overs)	v	England Lions; 297/3 (34.4 overs)
Andrew Balbirnie 60 (73); Tom Helm 3/49 (8.4 overs)		Phil Salt 100* (58); Mark Adair 2/74 (8 overs)

England Lions won by 7 wickets
Rose Bowl, Southampton
Umpires: Mike Burns (Eng) and Martin Saggers (Eng)

- Ireland won the toss and elected to bat.

== ODI series ==
=== 1st ODI ===
30 July 2020
14:00 (D/N)
Scorecard

Ireland; 172 (44.4 overs)	v	England; 174/4 (27.5 overs)
Curtis Campher 59* (118); David Willey 5/30 (8.4 overs)		Sam Billings 67* (54); Craig Young 2/56 (8 overs)

England won by 6 wickets
Rose Bowl, Southampton
Umpires: Mike Burns (Eng) and Alex Wharf (Eng)
Player of the match: David Willey (Eng)

- England won the toss and elected to field.
- Curtis Campher and Harry Tector (Ire) both made their ODI debuts.
- David Willey (Eng) took his first five-wicket haul in ODIs.
- World Cup Super League points: England 10, Ireland 0.

=== 2nd ODI ===
1 August 2020
14:00 (D/N)
Scorecard

Ireland; 212/9 (50 overs)	v	England; 216/6 (32.3 overs)
Curtis Campher 68 (87); Adil Rashid 3/34 (10 overs)		Jonny Bairstow 82 (41); Josh Little 3/60 (10 overs)

England won by 4 wickets
Rose Bowl, Southampton
Umpires: David Millns (Eng) and Alex Wharf (Eng)
Player of the match: Jonny Bairstow (Eng)

- Ireland won the toss and elected to bat.
- Adil Rashid became the first spin bowler for England to take 150 wickets in ODIs.
- Jonny Bairstow equalled the record for the fastest fifty by an England batsman in ODIs (21 balls).
- Jonny Bairstow also equalled the record for the fastest England batsman to score 3,000 runs in ODIs (72 innings).
- World Cup Super League points: England 10, Ireland 0.

=== 3rd ODI ===
4 August 2020
14:00 (D/N)
Scorecard

England; 328 (49.5 overs)	v	Ireland; 329/3 (49.5 overs)
Eoin Morgan 106 (84); Craig Young 3/53 (10 overs)		Paul Stirling 142 (128); Adil Rashid 1/61 (10 overs)

Ireland won by 7 wickets
Rose Bowl, Southampton
Umpires: David Millns (Eng) and Martin Saggers (Eng)
Player of the match: Paul Stirling (Ire)

- Ireland won the toss and elected to field.
- Andrew Balbirnie (Ire) scored his 2,000th run in ODIs.
- This was Ireland's highest successful run chase in ODIs.
- World Cup Super League points: Ireland 10, England 0.
