= Pakistani cricket team in England in 2019 =

International cricket tour

	England	Pakistan
- Dates: 27 April – 19 May 2019
Captains	Eoin Morgan (Note: Jos Buttler captained England in the fourth ODI.)	Sarfaraz Ahmed

One Day International series
- Results: England won the 5-match series 4–0
Most runs	Jason Roy (277)	Babar Azam (277)
Most wickets	Chris Woakes (10)	Imad Wasim (6)
- Player of the series: Jason Roy (Eng)

Twenty20 International series
- Results: England won the 1-match series 1–0
Most runs	Eoin Morgan (57)	Babar Azam (65)
Most wickets	Jofra Archer (2)	Shaheen Afridi (1); Hasan Ali (1); Imad Wasim (1)

The Pakistan cricket team toured England in May 2019 to play five One Day Internationals (ODIs) and one Twenty20 International (T20I) match ahead of the 2019 Cricket World Cup. The fixtures were part of both teams' preparation for the tournament. Three matches were played against English county sides as part of the tour, with 50-over matches played against Kent and Northants, and a Twenty20 match played against Leicestershire.

In addition to the provisional World Cup squad, Jofra Archer and Chris Jordan were named in England's squads for this series and the preceding ODI against Ireland, and were in contention for a place in the World Cup side depending on their performances. England finalised their fifteen-man World Cup squad following the conclusion of the matches against Pakistan. Mohammad Amir and Asif Ali were omitted from Pakistan's fifteen-man preliminary squad for the World Cup, but were included for this series as reserves.

England won the one-off T20I match by seven wickets. In the third ODI, Eoin Morgan played in his 198th match to become the most-capped player in ODIs for England, going past Paul Collingwood's total of 197 matches for the team. However, Morgan was suspended for the next ODI, following a slow over-rate in the third match. Jos Buttler was named as England's captain for the fourth ODI in Morgan's absence. England won the ODI series 4–0, after the first match was washed out.

England's series aggregate of 1,424 runs was the most for any team in an ODI series where they played a maximum of four innings. This surpassed India's total of 1,275 runs in their home series against Sri Lanka in December 2009.

== Squads ==
ODIs		T20I	
England	Pakistan	England	Pakistan
Eoin Morgan (c); Moeen Ali; Jofra Archer; Jonny Bairstow; Jos Buttler (wk); Tom Curran; Joe Denly; ~~Alex Hales~~; Chris Jordan; Liam Plunkett; Adil Rashid; Joe Root; Jason Roy; Ben Stokes; James Vince; David Willey; Chris Woakes; Mark Wood	Sarfaraz Ahmed (c, wk); Shaheen Afridi; Abid Ali; Asif Ali; Hasan Ali; Mohammad Amir; Faheem Ashraf; Babar Azam; Mohammad Hafeez; Mohammad Hasnain; Junaid Khan; ~~Shadab Khan~~; Yasir Shah; Shoaib Malik; Haris Sohail; Imam-ul-Haq; Imad Wasim; Fakhar Zaman	Eoin Morgan (c); Jofra Archer; ~~Sam Billings~~ (wk); Tom Curran; Joe Denly; Ben Duckett; Ben Foakes (wk); ~~Alex Hales~~; Chris Jordan; ~~Dawid Malan~~; Liam Plunkett; Adil Rashid; Joe Root; ~~Jason Roy~~; Phil Salt; James Vince; David Willey; ~~Mark Wood~~	Sarfaraz Ahmed (c, wk); Shaheen Afridi; Abid Ali; Asif Ali; Hasan Ali; Mohammad Amir; Faheem Ashraf; Babar Azam; ~~Mohammad Hafeez~~; Mohammad Hasnain; Junaid Khan; ~~Shadab Khan~~; Yasir Shah; ~~Shoaib Malik~~; Haris Sohail; Imam-ul-Haq; Imad Wasim; Fakhar Zaman

Ahead of the tour, Shadab Khan was ruled out of Pakistan's squad with a virus, with Yasir Shah named as his replacement. Shoaib Malik missed Pakistan's first two matches against England due to a personal issue. The Pakistan Cricket Board (PCB) confirmed that he was available for selection for the second ODI match. Mohammad Hafeez was also unavailable for the one-off T20I and the first two ODIs, after injuring his hand.

Sam Billings was ruled out of England's T20I squad after he dislocated his shoulder, and was replaced by Ben Foakes. Alex Hales was dropped from England's squads, following a 21-day ban for using recreational drugs and was replaced by James Vince. Jason Roy and Mark Wood were also withdrawn from the T20I squad prior to the series and were replaced by Ben Duckett and Dawid Malan. Malan then picked up a groin injury in the ODI against Ireland and was replaced by Phil Salt.

== Tour matches ==
=== One-day match: Kent vs Pakistan ===
27 April 2019
11:00
Scorecard

Pakistan; 358/7 (50 overs)	v	Kent; 258 (44.1 overs)
Imad Wasim 117* (78); Imran Qayyum 4/45 (10 overs)		Alex Blake 89 (48); Yasir Shah 3/90 (10 overs)

Pakistan won by 100 runs
County Cricket Ground, Beckenham
Umpires: Neil Bainton (Eng) and Mark Newell (Eng)

- Pakistan won the toss and elected to bat.
- Jordan Cox (Kent) made his List A debut.

=== One-day match: Northamptonshire vs Pakistan ===
29 April 2019
11:00
Scorecard

Northamptonshire; 273/6 (50 overs)	v	Pakistan; 275/2 (41 overs)
Josh Cobb 146* (145); Haris Sohail 1/18 (5 overs)		Fakhar Zaman 101 (81); Nathan Buck 1/52 (7 overs)

Pakistan won by 8 wickets
County Cricket Ground, Northampton
Umpires: Mike Burns (Eng) and Rob White (Eng)

- Northamptonshire won the toss and elected to bat.

=== Twenty-over match: Leicestershire vs Pakistan ===
1 May 2019
18:30 (D/N)
Scorecard

Pakistan; 200/6 (20 overs)	v	Leicestershire; 142 (19.2 overs)
Babar Azam 101 (63); Ben Mike 3/38 (4 overs)		Ben Mike 37 (26); Shaheen Afridi 2/12 (2.2 overs)

Pakistan won by 58 runs
Grace Road, Leicester
Umpires: Peter Hartley (Eng) and Tom Lungley (Eng)

- Leicestershire won the toss and elected to field.
- Will Davis and Ben Mike (Leicestershire) both made their T20 debuts.
- Babar Azam (Pak) scored his first T20 century.

== T20I match ==
=== Only T20I ===
5 May 2019
14:30
Scorecard

Pakistan; 173/6 (20 overs)	v	England; 175/3 (19.2 overs)
Babar Azam 65 (42); Jofra Archer 2/29 (4 overs)		Eoin Morgan 57* (29); Imad Wasim 1/24 (4 overs)

England won by 7 wickets
Sophia Gardens, Cardiff
Umpires: Michael Gough (Eng) and Alex Wharf (Eng)
Player of the match: Eoin Morgan (Eng)

- Pakistan won the toss and elected to bat.
- Jofra Archer, Ben Duckett, Ben Foakes (Eng), Imam-ul-Haq and Mohammad Hasnain (Pak) all made their T20I debuts.

== ODI series ==
=== 1st ODI ===
8 May 2019
13:00 (D/N)
Scorecard

Pakistan; 80/2 (19 overs)	v	England
Imam-ul-Haq 42* (68); Jofra Archer 1/6 (4 overs)

No result
The Oval, London
Umpires: Rob Bailey (Eng) and Paul Reiffel (Aus)

- England won the toss and elected to field.
- Rain during Pakistan's innings prevented any further play.

=== 2nd ODI ===
11 May 2019
11:00
Scorecard

England; 373/3 (50 overs)	v	Pakistan; 361/7 (50 overs)
Jos Buttler 110* (55); Yasir Shah 1/60 (7 overs)		Fakhar Zaman 138 (106); David Willey 2/57 (10 overs)

England won by 12 runs
Rose Bowl, Southampton
Umpires: Chris Gaffaney (NZ) and Tim Robinson (Eng)
Player of the match: Jos Buttler (Eng)

- Pakistan won the toss and elected to field.

=== 3rd ODI ===
14 May 2019
13:00 (D/N)
Scorecard

Pakistan; 358/9 (50 overs)	v	England; 359/4 (44.5 overs)
Imam-ul-Haq 151 (131); Chris Woakes 4/67 (10 overs)		Jonny Bairstow 128 (93); Junaid Khan 1/57 (8 overs)

England won by 6 wickets
County Ground, Bristol
Umpires: Michael Gough (Eng) and Paul Reiffel (Aus)
Player of the match: Jonny Bairstow (Eng)

- England won the toss and elected to field.
- Eoin Morgan became the most-capped player in ODIs for England, playing in his 198th match.
- Imam-ul-Haq scored the highest individual total for Pakistan against England in ODIs.

=== 4th ODI ===
17 May 2019
13:00 (D/N)
Scorecard

Pakistan; 340/7 (50 overs)	v	England; 341/7 (49.3 overs)
Babar Azam 115 (112); Tom Curran 4/75 (10 overs)		Jason Roy 114 (89); Imad Wasim 2/62 (10 overs)

England won by 3 wickets
Trent Bridge, Nottingham
Umpires: Chris Gaffaney (NZ) and Alex Wharf (Eng)
Player of the match: Jason Roy (Eng)

- England won the toss and elected to field.

=== 5th ODI ===
19 May 2019
11:00
Scorecard

England; 351/9 (50 overs)	v	Pakistan; 297 (46.5 overs)
Joe Root 84 (73); Shaheen Afridi 4/82 (10 overs)		Sarfaraz Ahmed 97 (80); Chris Woakes 5/54 (10 overs)

England won by 54 runs
Headingley, Leeds
Umpires: Michael Gough (Eng) and Paul Reiffel (Aus)
Player of the match: Chris Woakes (Eng)

- England won the toss and elected to bat.
