= English cricket team in Ireland in 2019 =

International cricket tour

	Ireland	England
- Date: 3 May 2019
Captains	William Porterfield	Eoin Morgan

One Day International series
- Results: England won the 1-match series 1–0
Most runs	Paul Stirling (33)	Ben Foakes (61)
Most wickets	Josh Little (4)	Liam Plunkett (4)

The England cricket team toured Ireland in May 2019 to play a one-off One Day International (ODI) match. The match took place ahead of Ireland's visit to England in July 2019, to play a one-off four-day Test match. In September 2018, The Village in Malahide was named as the venue for the match. The ODI fixture was part of England's preparation for the 2019 Cricket World Cup. England won the one-off ODI match by four wickets.

In addition to the provisional World Cup squad, Jofra Archer and Chris Jordan were named in England's squads for this match and the subsequent series against Pakistan, and were in contention for a place in the World Cup side depending on their performances. England finalised their fifteen-man World Cup squad following the conclusion of the matches against Pakistan.

== Squads ==
ODI
Ireland	England
William Porterfield (c); Mark Adair; Andrew Balbirnie; George Dockrell; Josh Little; Andrew McBrine; Barry McCarthy; James McCollum; Tim Murtagh; Kevin O'Brien; Boyd Rankin; Paul Stirling; ~~Stuart Thompson~~; Lorcan Tucker (wk); Gary Wilson (wk)	Eoin Morgan (c); Jofra Archer; ~~Sam Billings~~ (wk); Tom Curran; Joe Denly; Ben Duckett; Ben Foakes (wk); ~~Alex Hales~~; Chris Jordan; Dawid Malan; Liam Plunkett; Adil Rashid; Joe Root; ~~Jason Roy~~; James Vince; David Willey; ~~Mark Wood~~

After the England squad was announced, Sam Billings suffered a dislocated shoulder which ruled him out of the match. He was replaced by Ben Foakes. Alex Hales was dropped from England's squad, following a 21-day ban for using recreational drugs. Jason Roy and Mark Wood were also withdrawn prior to the match and were replaced by Ben Duckett and Dawid Malan. The day before the match, Mark Adair was added to Ireland's squad, replacing Stuart Thompson, who was ruled out due to injury.

== Only ODI ==
3 May 2019
10:45
Scorecard

Ireland; 198 (43.1 overs)	v	England; 199/6 (42 overs)
Paul Stirling 33 (44); Liam Plunkett 4/35 (7 overs)		Ben Foakes 61* (76); Josh Little 4/45 (8 overs)

England won by 4 wickets
The Village, Dublin
Umpires: Kumar Dharmasena (SL) and Paul Reynolds (Ire)
Player of the match: Ben Foakes (Eng)

- England won the toss and elected to field.
- The match was reduced to 45 overs per side due to a wet outfield.
- Mark Adair, Josh Little, Lorcan Tucker (Ire), Jofra Archer, Ben Foakes and Dawid Malan (Eng) all made their ODI debuts.
- Gary Wilson (Ire) played in his 100th ODI.
