= Ben Mike =

English cricketer (born 1998)

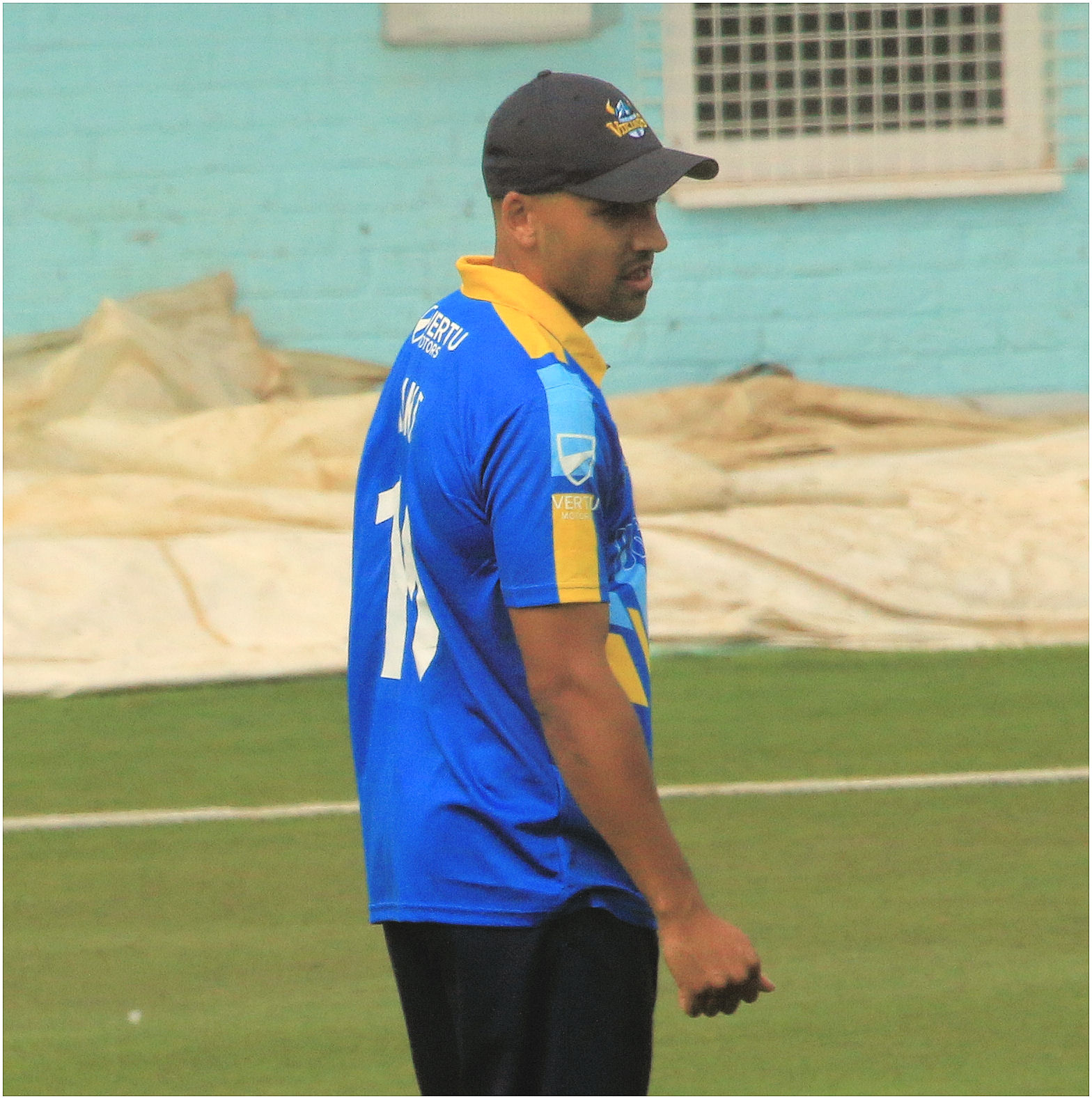
- Mike in 2023

Personal information
- Full name: Benjamin Wentworth Munro Mike
- Born: 24 August 1998 (age 28); Nottingham, England
- Batting: Right-handed
- Bowling: Right-arm medium
- Role: Bowling all-rounder

Domestic team information
- Years: Team
- 2018–2022: Leicestershire (squad no. 8)
- 2019: → Warwickshire (on loan)
- 2022: → Yorkshire (on loan)
- 2023: Yorkshire (squad no. 16)
- 2024–2026: Leicestershire
- First-class debut: 4 September 2018 Leicestershire v Sussex
- List A debut: 19 June 2018 Leicestershire v India A

Career statistics
Competition	FC	LA	T20
Matches	54	27	76
Runs scored	1,787	404	756
Batting average	24.14	22.44	18.90
100s/50s	0/11	0/2	0/0
Top score	99*	72*	39
Balls bowled	6,428	889	1,060
Wickets	125	29	64
Bowling average	37.81	37.41	27.78
5 wickets in innings	2	0	0
10 wickets in match	0	0	0
Best bowling	5/22	4/40	4/22
Catches/stumpings	11/–	7/–	33/–
- Source: Cricinfo, 26 September 2026

Benjamin Wentworth Munro Mike (born 24 August 1998) is an English cricketer. He made his List A debut for Leicestershire against India A in a tri-series warm-up match on 19 June 2018. He made his first-class debut for Leicestershire in the 2018 County Championship on 4 September 2018. He made his Twenty20 debut on 1 May 2019, for Leicestershire against the touring Pakistan team.

Mike signed for Yorkshire ahead of the 2023 season
