= Jason Roy =

English cricketer (born 1990)

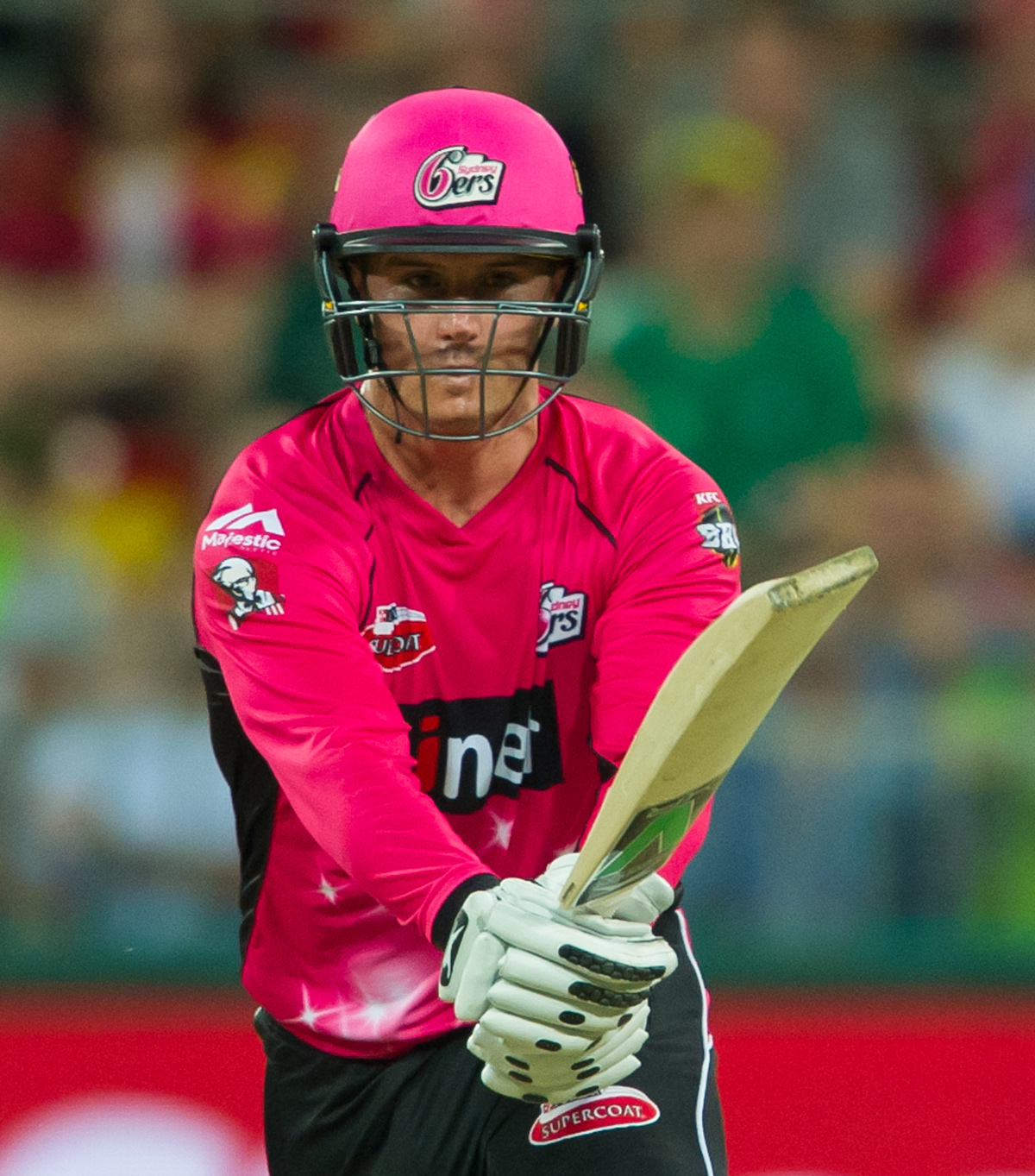
- Roy playing for the Sixers

Personal information
- Full name: Jason Jonathan Roy
- Born: 21 July 1990 (age 36); Durban, South Africa
- Height: 1.83 m (6 ft 0 in)
- Batting: Right-handed
- Bowling: Right-arm medium
- Role: Opening batsman

International information
- National side: England (2014–2023)
- Test debut (cap 691): 24 July 2019 v Ireland
- Last Test: 4 September 2019 v Australia
- ODI debut (cap 238): 8 May 2015 v Ireland
- Last ODI: 6 March 2023 v Bangladesh
- T20I debut (cap 70): 7 September 2014 v India
- Last T20I: 31 July 2022 v South Africa

Domestic team information
- Years: Team
- 2008–present: Surrey (Note: Only teams which Roy has played for in more than one season are listed here. See the article detail for other teams he has played for.)
- 2012–2013: Chittagong Kings
- 2016/17–2017/18: Sydney Sixers
- 2018–2024: Quetta Gladiators
- 2018–2019: Nelson Mandela Bay Giants
- 2021–2023: Oval Invincibles
- 2023–2024: Paarl Royals
- 2023-2024: Los Angeles Knight Riders
- 2026: Glasgow Cosmic

Career statistics
Competition	Test	ODI	T20I	FC
Matches	5	116	64	90
Runs scored	187	4,271	1,522	4,878
Batting average	18.70	39.91	24.15	35.60
100s/50s	0/1	12/21	0/8	9/23
Top score	72	180	78	143
Balls bowled	–	–	–	712
Wickets	–	–	–	14
Bowling average	–	–	–	35.35
5 wickets in innings	–	–	–	0
10 wickets in match	–	–	–	0
Best bowling	–	–	—	4/47
Catches/stumpings	1/–	46/–	19/–	77/–
Medal record
Men's Cricket
Representing England
ICC Cricket World Cup
Winner	2019 England and Wales
ICC T20 World Cup
Runner-up	2016 India
- Source: ESPNcricinfo, 26 May 2025

Jason Jonathan Roy (born 21 July 1990) is an English cricketer who played for England in One Day International (ODI) and Twenty20 International (T20I) cricket, and previously played for the Test team. In domestic cricket, he represents Surrey, and has played in multiple Twenty20 leagues around the world.

Born in South Africa, Roy moved to England as a child. He made his T20I debut in 2014, his ODI debut in 2015, and played for the Test team in 2019. He was part of the England team that won the 2019 Cricket World Cup.

Roy plays as a right-handed opening batter. Along with Alex Hales, he holds the England record for highest ODI partnership, of 256* against Sri Lanka during their 2016 tour of England, and previously held the England record for highest ODI score (180 against Australia during England's 2018 tour). Roy was the first batter to be given out for obstructing the field in T20Is.

== Early career ==
Having moved to England along with his family from South Africa when he was 10 years old, he attended The Hawthorns School for a few years then Whitgift School. Whilst at Whitgift, he played with future Surrey teammate and England Test opener Rory Burns, who is the same age. He also played for local club Reigate Priory Cricket Club within Surrey. He represented Surrey in age group cricket from Under-11 through to Under-19 and Academy level. He took part in the Surrey Under-19 tour to South Africa in 2007, where he top-scored for Surrey with an innings of 51 in a one-day match against Western Province Under-19s.

He was a member of the 2008 intake of players to the Pemberton Greenish Surrey Academy, and on 15 June 2007 made a decisive contribution on his one-day debut for the Surrey second team, scoring 48 from 33 balls in a Second XI Trophy match against Hampshire, which Surrey won by 3 runs.

Roy made no further appearances for the Surrey second team in 2007, but was selected to represent the South at Under-17 level in the ECB Regional Festival, held at Loughborough in July 2007, where he played in three matches, against the West, Midlands and North.

In the 2008 season, Roy established himself in the Surrey second team. In his debut in the Second XI Championship, Roy scored 88 from 89 balls against a Hampshire attack which included the South African Test match bowler Nantie Hayward, having come to the crease with Surrey in trouble at 89–4.

== Domestic career ==
He made his debut for the Surrey first team in a Twenty20 Cup match against Middlesex on 27 June 2008, and made his List A debut in the Natwest Pro40 League fixture against Yorkshire on 20 July 2008, the day before his 18th birthday.

He was used as a substitute fielder by England against South Africa in the final Test of the 2008 series at The Oval.

In September 2008, Roy was selected for the ECB Elite Player Development squad taking part in a triangular tournament against University Sport South Africa and Marylebone Cricket Club (MCC) Universities. Roy was selected for two of his team's four matches. His second match was disrupted by the weather and was declared a no result in the thirteenth over of MCC Universities' innings, which was being bowled by Roy.

In 2008, Roy won the Easter Scholarship to spend the 2008/2009 winter at the Darren Lehmann Academy in Adelaide. While in Australia, Roy also played club cricket for Port Adelaide Cricket Club, and was part of the team which won the XXXX Gold Grade 20/20 Competition, scoring 20 runs from 12 balls in the final played at the Adelaide Oval. This was the club's first victory in the competition.

In April 2009, Roy played in a pre-season match for Surrey against Leeds/Bradford University Centre of Cricketing Excellence. Batting at number five, Roy was dismissed for a duck in Surrey's first innings, but fared better with the ball, taking 2 wickets for 51 runs from five overs.

In spite of his promising performances for the Surrey second team the previous year, Roy was unable to win a place in the team at the beginning of the 2009 season. However, on 25 April 2009, he reminded the county selectors of his ability while playing for his club, Reigate Priory, in a 50-over per side match against the Surrey Second XI. He took a catch as Surrey were dismissed for 157, and opened the innings for Reigate Priory, scoring 69 runs from only 51 balls against a bowling attack including former England international James Ormond before being caught behind. This innings was instrumental in Reigate Priory reaching their target of 158 with more than 22 overs to spare. On 23 May 2009, Roy scored 115 off 88 balls in Reigate Priory's victory over Spencer in the Surrey Championship Premier Division.

Selected for Surrey to play against Warwickshire in the Under-19s County Championship at Whitgift School on 6 July 2009, Roy scored 129 from 106 balls in a drawn match. Following this impressive performance, Roy made his first appearance of the season in Surrey Second XI's match against Somerset at Millfield School on 14 July, scoring 20 in Surrey's first innings. Roy retained his place in the team for the friendly match against Yorkshire Second XI in Guildford on 11 August. Roy top-scored in Surrey's second innings with 45, although Yorkshire won by an innings with a day to spare.

Roy's next appearance for Surrey Second XI was on 18 August against MCC Universities in the Second XI Championship. Playing on familiar territory at Whitgift School, Roy scored 118 from 115 balls in a drawn match. On his return to the one-day team against Kent on 24 August, Roy top scored in Surrey's innings with 55. However, this promising run of form was abruptly ended in the Second XI Championship match against the same opponents which began the following day. Roy recorded a pair, although he took a catch in Kent's second innings.

Better performances for his club (including an aggressive 138 from 60 balls against Henley) and the county Second XI in September 2009 led to a recall to the Surrey first team for the NatWest Pro40 League fixture against Leicestershire on 27 September 2009. Roy opened Surrey's innings, but scored only 6 runs. However, Surrey won the match by four wickets. This was to be Roy's first and only competitive match for the Surrey first team during the 2009 season.

=== Breakout year 2010 ===
Roy began the 2010 season as a regular in the Surrey Second XI in both Championship (three-day) and Trophy (one-day) cricket. After an unremarkable start to the season, Roy made his first significant contributions to the team in May, scoring centuries in three successive Championship matches, against Essex, Sussex and Durham respectively. While he scored a greater number of runs against Essex (180) and Durham (120), the innings against Sussex was perhaps the most impressive. In Surrey's second innings, Roy batted at number five and came to the crease with the score 42/3 against a bowling attack containing internationals Yasir Arafat and James Kirtley. When Roy was dismissed for 104, the score was 260–5, setting the platform for Surrey's victory. Roy's century was the top score in Surrey's second innings.

Roy maintained his form with a century for Reigate Priory, but as the county schedule turned to a long period without Championship matches, he had no opportunity to continue the run. However, he had caught the attention of Surrey's Cricket Manager, Chris Adams, and was included in Surrey's senior team for the 2010 Friends Provident t20 tournament, making his first appearance against Hampshire on 22 June, scoring 12 runs at a strike rate of 109.09.

The following day, Roy made history by scoring an unbeaten century against Kent (101 from only 57 balls), the first century scored by a Surrey batter in Twenty20 cricket, as Surrey won the game by 38 runs.

Roy earned further plaudits with another aggressive innings against Somerset on 2 July, scoring 74 from 50 balls in another Surrey victory.

Surrey did not progress beyond the group stages of the 2010 Friends Provident t20, and Roy's personal performances also dipped towards the end of that competition. However, he continued to score heavily for the Second XI and appeared for the Surrey first team in the Clydesdale Bank 40 competition between July and September, the highlight being an innings of 60 from 49 balls against Sussex in a tied match on 4 September. During the match, Roy enjoyed a partnership of 105 runs in 17 overs alongside Surrey's new signing, England international Kevin Pietersen.

He made his first-class debut on 24 August 2010 against Leicestershire at Grace Road, and was last man out in Surrey's first innings, scoring 76 runs off 65 balls (including 9 fours and 3 sixes) in Surrey's first innings total of 483. The last four wickets fell for only 7 runs, preventing Roy from scoring a century in his maiden first-class innings. In his second first-class match, Roy scored 69 against Glamorgan on 7 September 2010 and retained his place in the team for Surrey's final County Championship match of the season against Gloucestershire. By the end of the 2010 season, Roy was established as a first team regular in all forms of cricket, and signed a two-year contract with Surrey, which he described as "a dream come true".

=== 2011 season ===
Although he ended the 2010 season as a first team regular and demonstrated his fitness in prior to the 2011 season (coming top in the Surrey squad's pre-season Bleep Test), Roy was only selected for one pre-season match in the first team, scoring 0 and 4 against Middlesex. Surrey had strengthened their batting resources over the preceding winter, confirming the long term signing of Kevin Pietersen, as well as bringing in new batsmen Zander de Bruyn and Tom Maynard, and Roy began the season in the Second XI.

However, Roy was included in the first team for the Clydesdale Bank 40 competition and made an immediate impression, scoring 60 runs in his first match, against Scotland, and 76 against Hampshire. Roy scored another half century in the return fixture against Scotland. He made his first County Championship appearance of the season on 4 May against Leicestershire, and although he was dismissed for 5 in the first innings, he scored an aggressive 76 in the second innings as Surrey set the platform for victory. This innings equalled his highest first-class score at the time.

Roy was rested for the Championship match against Essex on 18 May as Surrey included their centrally-contracted international players, Kevin Pietersen and Chris Tremlett, but in the following match, against Glamorgan on 24 May, Roy returned to the first team. After an inauspicious first innings in which he scored only three runs, Roy took his maiden first-class wickets in Glamorgan's second innings, returning bowling figures of 2/29. He then opened Surrey's second innings and scored his maiden first-class century (an unbeaten 106 from 109 balls), guiding Surrey to a comfortable draw. He brought up his hundred with a six struck into the pavilion.

On 17 August he scored his first 40 over century, making 101 off 95 balls against Warwickshire at Edgbaston. He followed this up four days later with 131 off 99 balls, helping Surrey defeat Leicestershire at Grace Road.

Roy's season ended in fine style, being part of the Surrey team who won the CB40 final at Lord's against Somerset. Although Roy's day wasn't a personal success - being dismissed for a typically aggressive 11 immediately before a rain delay - he could at least be content that, as the second highest run scorer in the competition he had played a significant part in Surrey's progress to that stage.

On 29 September 2011, Roy was named by the ECB in the England Performance Programme Squad for 2011–12.

=== T20 franchises ===
==== Bangladesh Premier League ====
Roy participated in the 2018–19 Bangladesh Premier League for the Sylhet Sixers. He played four games, with his top score being 42.

He was selected to play for Dhaka Capitals in the 2025 Bangladesh Premier League.

==== Big Bash League ====
After a brief BBL spell with Sydney Thunder in 2015 he joined the Sydney Sixers for the 2016–17 season. In the first match of the tournament against Sydney Thunder he scored 29 in a winning effort from the Sixers. Then in the second he scored a 40, which included a towering 6 off Shaun Tait. For the third match he was injured, after pulling a back muscle in training.

==== Pakistan Super League ====
Roy was bought by Lahore Qalandars for US$70,000 for the 2017 PSL. He played 5 matches scoring 176 runs before leaving early for national duties. In the 2018 PSL draft, he was picked by Quetta Gladiators in the supplementary round as he was partially available. He played just two games for Quetta Gladiators in the season.

In December 2019, during the 2020 PSL players draft, he was drafted by Quetta Gladiators as their Platinum Category pick, becoming the overall first pick of the draft night. He managed to score 233 runs in 8 innings with a highest score of 73 not out against Peshawar Zalmi. In 2021, he was again picked by Quetta Gladiators for the 2022 PSL.

==== Mzansi Super League ====
In October 2018, he was named in Nelson Mandela Bay Giants' squad as their International Marquee player for the first edition of the Mzansi Super League T20 tournament. In September 2019, he was named in the squad for the Nelson Mandela Bay Giants team for the 2019 Mzansi Super League tournament.

==== Indian Premier League ====
He played three games for Gujarat Lions in the 2017 IPL. For the 2018 IPL he played for Delhi Daredevils, for whom he scored a match-winning 91* in his first match. In the 2020 IPL auction, he was bought by the Delhi Capitals ahead of the 2020 Indian Premier League. On 27 August 2020, Roy opted out of 2020 Indian Premier League for personal reasons and as a result he was replaced by Australian all-rounder Daniel Sams. He was released by Delhi Capitals before the 2021 auction. Ahead of the 2021 Indian Premier League, he was signed by the Sunrisers Hyderabad as a replacement for Mitchell Marsh. In the 2022 IPL Auction, Roy was bought by the Gujarat Titans. However, he later pulled out of the 2022 IPL before the tournament started, citing the challenge of being in the tournament's bubble for a prolonged period of personal time. He was bought by Kolkata Knight Riders replacing injured Shreyas Iyer.

==== The Hundred ====
In April 2022, he was bought by the Oval Invincibles for the 2022 season of The Hundred.

==== Major League Cricket ====
He was bought by Los Angeles Knight Riders ahead of the 2023 Major League Cricket hosted in US

== England career ==
=== 2014: India ===
Roy made his Twenty20 International debut against India in September 2014, in the only T20I of the series. He was dismissed for 8 in his first international innings. His first international runs were scored when he played a reverse-sweep shot off his second delivery, hitting Ravichandran Ashwin for four runs. He was dismissed by Mohammed Shami after popping a soft catch up to the fielder at cover.

=== 2015: New Zealand and Australia ===
He made his One Day International debut for England in a one-off ODI against Ireland at Malahide on 8 May 2015, but the match was abandoned due to rain. Roy was then selected again to represent England in the five-match series against New Zealand, in June 2015. In the first match, he was out caught from the first ball of the innings. Despite this, England went on to post a score 408 and went on to win the match. In the second ODI he made 39 but England went on to lose the match, which was affected by rain. England again lost the next match, with Roy this time making 9. He hit 38 in the fourth ODI as England went on to win by seven wickets to level the series at 2-2. He was out for 12 in the final match, which England won to win the series 3–2. In the only T20 match between the teams, Roy made 23 as England won by 56 runs.

In the T20 against Australia, Roy made 11 as England won by 5 runs. In the first ODI between England and Australia, Roy batted well, making 67 although England lost the game by 59 runs. England lost the second match as well, with Roy making 31. England won the third match of the series, with Roy continuing his good form with a score of 63. Roy was out for 36 in the penultimate match of the series, with England winning the match by 3 wickets to level the series at 2-2. Roy scored just 4 runs in the final and deciding match of the series as England collapsed to 138 all out. Australia won the match by 8 wickets with over 25 overs to spare, winning the series 3–2.

=== 2015–16: Pakistan and South Africa ===
Roy was dismissed for a duck in the first ODI against Pakistan, which England lost by six wickets. He secured a half century in the next game as England fought back to level the series, winning by 95 runs. After making seven in the third ODI, Roy scored his maiden ODI ton (102 off 117 balls) in the final game of the series, which England won by 84 runs. Roy played in all three T20Is against Pakistan. He could only make nine in the first match, which England won by 14 runs. His highest score of the series came in the second match, where he hit 29. In the third match of the series he was out for a duck.

After now establishing himself at the top of the order, Roy was again selected for England's limited overs tour of South Africa. After scoring 48 in the first game, he chipped in with 14 in the next game, with England winning both matches to go 2–0 up in the series. However, disappointment followed and England lost their next three games. Roy did not perform well, making scores of 20, 6 and 8 as England went from 2–0 up to losing the series 3–2. Roy also struggled for form in the two T20Is between the two teams, as he failed to get into double figures in either match as England lost the series 2–0.

=== 2016: T20 World Cup, Sri Lanka and Pakistan ===
Roy was selected in England's T20 World Cup squad but struggled in the opening game defeat against the West Indies. In the second match, he hit 43 off just 16 balls to help England chase down 230 against South Africa. However, he was out cheaply in the game against Afghanistan, making just five, although England won the game. After scoring 42 in the final group game against Sri Lanka, he smashed a quickfire 78 in the semi-final against New Zealand on a Feroz Shah Kotla wicket to help England qualify for the final against the West Indies. Roy was out for a duck in the final, and England went on to lose the game to West Indies. He was named in the 'Team of the Tournament' for the 2016 T20 World Cup by the ICC and Cricbuzz.

Roy kept his place in the ODI squad for the series against Sri Lanka. In the first Match he scored 3 runs, as England managed to tie the match. In the second match he made an outstanding 112 not out, as he shared a record opening stand with Alex Hales of 256. He also got two run outs as he won man of the match. In the third match he made an unbeaten five as weather ended the match. In the fourth match he scored his second century of the series, making 162 as England won the match by six wickets. In the final game of the series he hit 34 as England scored 324 and won the match by 122 runs. Roy was named man of the series following his impressive performances. He was out for a duck in the only T20I between the two teams, which England won by eight wickets.

In the first ODI of the series against Pakistan, Roy scored 65 off 56 balls as England won by DLS method. Roy was awarded the man of the match award for his efforts. In the next 3 ODIs he made scores of 0, 15 and 14 respectively as England built a 4–0 series lead. In the fifth ODI Roy made 87, although Pakistan won by 4 wickets to deny England a 5–0 series whitewash. In the only T20I of the series, Roy made 21 runs from 20 balls as Pakistan chased down England's target of 134 with over 5 overs to spare.

=== 2016–17: Bangladesh, India and West Indies ===
Roy made 41 in the first ODI against Bangladesh as England scored 309/8 to win by 21 runs. He made 13 in the next game as England lost by 34 runs. Roy missed the final game of the series through injury, although England won to win the series 2–1.

Roy made 73 in the first ODI against India, as England made 350/7, although they lost the match by three wickets. In the second match he made 82 but England fell 15 runs short of India's target. In the final match of the series he made 65 as England posted 321 and won by five runs. He made 19 in the first T20I as England won by seven wickets. In the second match he made ten as England lost by five runs. In the final match he made 32 but England could only manage 127 and lost by 75 runs to lose the series 2–1.

Roy made 13 in the first ODI against the West Indies as England won by 45 runs. In the second match he made 52 as England chased down their target of 226 to win by four wickets. In the final game of the series he made 17 as England won by 186 runs.

=== 2017: South Africa, 2017 Champions Trophy and West Indies ===
England first played two ODIs against Ireland as a warmup for the Champions Trophy. with Roy out for a duck in the first ODI, and making 20 in the second, helping England to a 2–0 series victory. Roy struggled in England's next warmup matches for the Champions Trophy against South Africa. Scoring just 1, 8 and 4 in his 3 innings, although England won the series 2–1.

Roy was named in England's 15-man squad for the 2017 Champions Trophy. In England's first group game, Roy scored 1 run and took a catch off of Liam Plunkett's bowling. After scoring 13 against New Zealand, and 4 against Australia in his next two innings, Roy was dropped by England for their semi-final against Pakistan which they went on to lose by 8 wickets.

After the Champions Trophy, England played South Africa in 3 T20Is, with Roy scoring 28, 67 and 8 runs respectively. During the second T20I whilst on 67, he became the first player in T20I cricket to be given out for Obstructing the field.

Roy played in the only T20I game between England and the West Indies in 2017, being bowled out for a Golden duck by Jerome Taylor. Roy was left out of the first 3 ODIs, however, was recalled by England for the 4th ODI at The Oval. On his return he made 84 runs off 66 balls, helping England to win by 6 runs by DLS. In the 5th and final ODI, Roy made 96 runs off 70 balls as England won by 9 wickets, helping England to clinch a 4–0 series victory.

=== 2017–18: Australia and New Zealand ===
In the first ODI against Australia, Roy scored 180 which is the highest score by an English batter in ODIs. His feat also won him the man of the match award as England won by 5 wickets. In the second ODI Roy managed only 2 runs before he was out to Mitchell Starc, however, despite this England went on to win the match by 4 wickets. In the 3rd, 4th and 5th ODI series, Roy made 19, 0 and 49 respectively as England won the series 4–1.

Roy represented England in the 2017–18 Trans-Tasman Tri-Series against Australia and New Zealand. Roy made scores of 9, 8, 8 and 21 in the four T20Is as England finished with a record of 1–3, finishing in third place. Roy made scores of 49, 8, 15 and 42 in the first 4 ODIs respectively, before missing the fifth ODI due to injury as he struggled with back spasms. During the 4th ODI, Roy scored his 2,000th run in ODIs.

=== 2018: Australia and India ===
England played a one-off ODI against Scotland on 10 June at The Grange Club in Edinburgh. Roy made 34, as Scotland beat England by 6 runs to claim their first ODI win over England.

Roy was selected to play against Australia in the ODI and T20I series in England. In the first ODI of the series, he was bowled out for a duck. He responded in the second ODI by making 120 from 108 balls as England won by 3 wickets to take a 2–0 lead in the series, he was also awarded the man of the match award. In the third ODI, he was run out whilst on 82. He scored his second ODI century of the series in the fourth ODI when he made 101 from just 83 deliveries, winning his second man of the match award of the series. In the fifth ODI he made just 1 run, however, England won the match and completed a 5–0 series whitewash. In the only T20I of the series, Roy scored 44 runs of 26 balls as England won by 28 runs.

Roy played in the 3 T20Is and ODIs against India in 2018. In the first two T20Is he made scores of 30 and 15 respectively. In the 3rd T20I Roy scored 67 off 31 balls, equalling England's record for the most sixes hit by a player in a T20I innings. Roy made scores of 38 and 40 in the first two ODIs of the series respectively, before missing the 3rd ODI due to injury. England went on to win the series 2–1.

=== 2018–19: Sri Lanka and West Indies ===
England played a five-match ODI series against Sri Lanka in October 2018, with Roy playing a part in all 5 ODIs. In the first ODI, he made 24 before being caught out. The match was rained off after 15 overs and there was No result. In the next four matches he made scores of 0, 41, 45 and 4 respectively and England won the series 3–1. In the only T20I of the series, Roy scored 69 off 36 to help England win by 30 runs.

The five match ODI series against the West Indies kicked off perfectly for Roy, as he scored 123 runs from 85 balls taking the man of the match award as England took a 1–0 series lead. Roy made just 2 runs in the second ODI before the 3rd match was Abandoned. He was ruled out of the fourth and fifth ODIs through a hamstring injury. Roy wasn't included in England's squad for the 3 T20Is, instead returning home for the birth of his first child.

=== 2019: Cricket World Cup ===
In preparation for the 2019 Cricket World Cup, England agreed to warmup matches against Ireland and Pakistan; one ODI against Ireland, and a T20I and 5ODIs against Pakistan. Roy was initially in the squad for the first ODI against Ireland and the T20I against Pakistan, however, was withdrawn after suffering with a back spasm, he was left in the 17-man for the 5 match ODI series versus Pakistan. The first ODI against Pakistan ended in No result. Roy started the series in good form, hitting 87 and 76 in his first two innings. In the 4th ODI he was awarded man of the match after scoring 114, his 8th ODI century, after a "near sleepless" night spent in the hospital with his two-month old daughter. Roy missed the fifth ODI, after being given time off by the ECB to spend time with his daughter who was hospitalised a few days before. Roy was awarded the Man of the Series for his performances during the series.

In April 2019, he was named in England's squad for the 2019 Cricket World Cup. On 3 June 2019, in England's match against Pakistan, Roy scored his 3,000th run in ODI cricket. On 8 June Roy scored 153 runs against Bangladesh at Sophia Gardens which is the second-highest scored by an Englishmen in World Cup cricket, second to only Andrew Strauss' 158 at the 2011 World Cup. During England's win against the West Indies, Roy re-aggravated a hamstring injury he had been suffering with early in the season whilst fielding during the first innings. This led to him not batting during the second innings and missing England's next 3 matches. Roy returned against India in a crucial match for England, who needed to win to keep their qualification fate in their own hands. Roy contributing 66 runs off 57 balls despite not being fully fit, helping England to a 31 run victory.

In the semi-final against Australia, Roy scored 85 runs off 65 balls before being given out caught behind by umpire Dharmasena, off a ball which TV replays and UltraEdge suggested he had not hit. England had already lost their review, so the umpire's original decision had to stand. Roy protested against his dismissal and failed to leave the playing area in a timely manner and he was subsequently fined 30% of his match fee and given two demerit points for dissent. Despite this, Roy was widely praised for his assertive and fast-moving style of play, and was credited for unnerving Australia early on in the innings. On 14 July, Roy played in his maiden World Cup final against New Zealand. Roy scored 19 runs in England's pursuit of the 242 runs posted by the Black Caps. The match ended in a tie and went to a Super Over, where Roy was selected as England's third batsmen, although England did not end up losing a wicket. Roy ran out Martin Guptill who was attempting to come back for a second run, off of Jofra Archer's final delivery of the super over. New Zealand needed two runs to win the World Cup and would otherwise lose, hence the run out meant that England won their maiden World Cup.

Roy was included in the ICC's CWC2019 Team of the Tournament as one of the opening batsmen alongside Rohit Sharma. They stated that "The England opener had a decisive impact on his team's result in a manner unlike anyone else in the tournament. Roy instilled a much-needed sense of energy in his team, after they lost back-to-back games to Sri Lanka and Australia, when Roy was sidelined due to hamstring injury. His impact was felt in England's must-win games, against India and New Zealand in the round-robin, and against Australia in the semi-final, as he stitched together three successive century stands with his opening partner Jonny Bairstow. Having scored 443 runs from seven innings at an impressive strike-rate of 115.36, Roy forms a formidable opening partnership with Rohit Sharma in this XI".

=== 2019: Test debut and The Ashes ===
In July 2019, Roy was named in England's Test squad, for their one-off match against Ireland at Lord's. He made his Test debut in the match, scoring 5 runs in the first innings and 72 off 78 in the second. He kept his place in the team for the first four Tests of the 2019 Ashes series, but was dropped for the fifth after a string of low scores.

=== 2020 and 2021 ===
Roy was part of the England team for the home ODI series against Ireland and Australia, but missed the T20I series against both Pakistan and Australia due to an injury. In September 2021, Roy was named in England's squad for the 2021 ICC Men's T20 World Cup.

=== 2022 ===
In 2022, Roy admitted a charge of "conducting himself in a manner which may be prejudicial to the interests of cricket or which may bring cricket, the ECB and himself into disrepute", and was banned for two international matches suspended for 12 months "dependent on good behaviour". The cause of the charge was unclear. At the same time Roy withdrew from the upcoming Indian Premier League auction to spend more time with his family.

=== 2023 ===
Despite being named in the provisional squad, Roy was left out of the England squad for the 2023 Cricket World Cup, after back spasms forced him to miss all four warm-up matches against New Zealand. The good form of Dawid Malan, his replacement as opener in the team, saw Roy's place in the squad taken by Harry Brook.

He has not been picked for England since.

== Personal life ==
Roy took A-level examinations in Sports Science and Business in 2008, and was offered a place at St. Mary's University College, though he turned down the opportunity in order to concentrate on cricket. In October 2017, Roy married Elle Moore; the couple have two children. He is a cousin of Dutch international cricketer Shane Snater.

== International records ==
- Roy was part of an opening partnership of 256 with Alex Hales against Sri Lanka in 2016, which was then the highest successful run chase without losing a wicket in ODIs. It is also the highest partnership for England for any wicket in ODIs.
- Roy scored 180 (off 151 balls) and partnered with Joe Root for highest ever third-wicket partnership for England (to date), with 221 runs off 220 balls in an ODI against Australia on 14 January 2018 at the Melbourne Cricket Ground.
