= Ben Foakes =

English cricketer (born 1993)

Benjamin Foakes
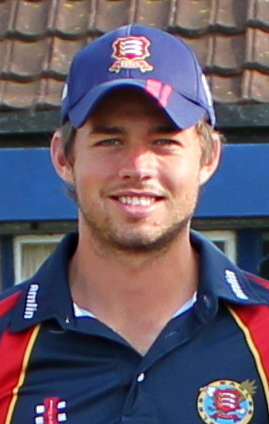
- Foakes in 2012

Personal information
- Full name: Benjamin Thomas Foakes
- Born: 15 February 1993 (age 33); Colchester, Essex, England
- Height: 6 ft 1 in (1.85 m)
- Batting: Right-handed
- Bowling: Right-arm medium
- Role: Wicket-keeper-batter

International information
- National side: England (2018-2024)
- Test debut (cap 689): 6 November 2018 v Sri Lanka
- Last Test: 7 March 2024 v India
- Only ODI (cap 253): 3 May 2019 v Ireland
- Only T20I (cap 85): 5 May 2019 v Pakistan

Domestic team information
- Years: Team
- 2011–2014: Essex
- 2014: Colts
- 2015–present: Surrey

Career statistics
Competition	Test	ODI	FC	LA
Matches	25	1	194	88
Runs scored	1,139	61	9,968	2,368
Batting average	29.20	—	38.78	35.87
100s/50s	2/4	0/1	19/53	1/19
Top score	113*	61*	141*	106
Catches/stumpings	69/10	2/1	516/41	94/12
- Source: ESPNcricinfo, 27 September 2026

Benjamin Thomas Foakes (born 15 February 1993) is an English professional cricketer who plays internationally for the England Test cricket team. In domestic cricket, he represents Surrey, having previously played for Essex.

Foakes made his Test debut in 2018, and played one game for each of the England One Day International and Twenty20 International teams in 2019. He plays as a right-handed wicket-keeper-batsman.

== Early life and education ==
Foakes was born in Colchester, Essex and educated at Tendring Technology College. His father was English football Premier League referee, Peter Foakes.

== Domestic career ==
During the 2011 English season, Foakes made his debut for Essex in a first-class match against the touring Sri Lankans at the County Ground, Chelmsford. He was dismissed for 5 runs in Essex's first-innings by Thisara Perera. He took three catches from behind the stumps, taking two in the Sri Lankans first-innings and a single catch in their second. In September 2011, he signed a professional contract which ran until 2013.

Foakes found he was unable to force a regular place in the Essex first team, and on 14 August 2014, it was announced that he had joined Surrey County Cricket Club. Foakes was part of the Surrey team that won the 2018 County Championship and the 2022 County Championship.

On 18 September 2023, Foakes signed a new multi-year contract extension at Surrey after becoming a very important member of the team since his arrival by contributing with his wicketkeeping and batting. Foakes since joining Surrey has amassed over 5,000 First-Class runs averaging just under 43 and has more than 300 dismissals behind the stumps.

== International career ==
Foakes made his debut for England Under-19s in January 2011, playing two Youth Test matches against Sri Lanka Under-19s during England's tour to Sri Lanka. It was during this tour that he made his Youth One Day International debut. To date, he has had made six appearances in that format, with the most recent appearance coming in July 2011 when he played three Youth One Day Internationals against South Africa Under-19s.

In September 2017, he was named in England's Test squad for the 2017–18 Ashes series, though he ended up not playing in any of the international matches. In October 2018, he was added to England's Test squad for the series against Sri Lanka. He made his Test debut for England against Sri Lanka on 6 November 2018, scoring 107 in the first innings and getting England to a competitive total. He was the 20th batsman for England to score a century on debut in Tests, the second English wicket-keeper to do so after Matt Prior, and the fifth keeper-batsman overall.

In April 2019, Foakes was added to England's squad for the one-off One Day International (ODI) against Ireland and the one-off Twenty20 International (T20I) against Pakistan. He replaced Sam Billings who was ruled out of the side with a dislocated shoulder. He made his ODI debut for England against Ireland on 3 May 2019, in which he was awarded man of the match for scoring 61 not out, as well as taking two catches and a stumping. He made his T20I debut for England against Pakistan on 5 May 2019.

On 29 May 2020, Foakes was named in a 55-man group of players to begin training ahead of international fixtures starting in England following the COVID-19 pandemic. On 17 June 2020, Foakes was included in England's 30-man squad to start training behind closed doors for the Test series against the West Indies. On 4 July 2020, Foakes was named as one of the nine reserve players for the first Test match of the series.

In February 2021, Foakes featured in England's away Test series against India in the absence of Jos Buttler from the second Test onwards. In the second Test in Chennai, Foakes made three stumpings, making him the first English keeper to do so in Asia and equaling the English record for most stumpings in a match.

Foakes had been in line to play his maiden home Test series but due to a hamstring injury he was not part of England's Test squad for their series against New Zealand in 2021. He played as first-choice wicket-keeper in both 2022 home Test series against New Zealand and South Africa, making important contributions behind the stumps and with the bat. In the Second Test victory against South Africa he was praised by captain Ben Stokes for his seven catches and a match-defining innings of 113 not out.

== See also ==
- List of centuries scored on Test cricket debut
