= Jofra Archer =

Barbadian and English cricketer (born 1995)

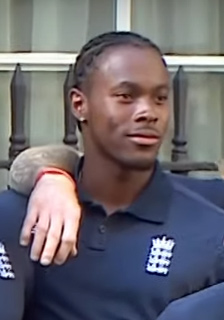
- Jofra Archer in 2019

Personal information
- Full name: Jofra Chioke Archer
- Born: 1 April 1995 (age 31); Bridgetown, Barbados
- Height: 1.82 m (6 ft 0 in)
- Batting: Right-handed
- Bowling: Right-arm fast
- Role: Bowler

International information
- National side: England (2019–present)
- Test debut (cap 693): 14 August 2019 v Australia
- Last Test: 9 September 2026 v Pakistan
- ODI debut (cap 252): 3 May 2019 v Ireland
- Last ODI: 18 November 2026 v Australia
- ODI shirt no.: 22
- T20I debut (cap 83): 5 May 2019 v Pakistan
- Last T20I: 19 September 2026 v Sri Lanka
- T20I shirt no.: 22

Domestic team information
- Years: Team
- 2016–present: Sussex (squad no. 22)
- 2017: Khulna Titans
- 2017/18–2018/19: Hobart Hurricanes (squad no. 22)
- 2018: Quetta Gladiators
- 2018–2020, 2025–present: Rajasthan Royals (squad no. 22)
- 2021–present: Southern Brave
- 2022/23: MI Cape Town
- 2022–23: Mumbai Indians

Career statistics
Competition	Test	ODI	T20I	FC
Matches	23	45	51	54
Runs scored	364	239	129	1,441
Batting average	12.13	15.93	11.72	22.51
100s/50s	0/1	0/0	0/0	0/7
Top score	51	38*	21	81*
Balls bowled	4,529	2,330	1,126	10,884
Wickets	83	73	68	222
Bowling average	28.63	27.27	23.00	25.17
5 wickets in innings	4	1	0	11
10 wickets in match	0	0	0	1
Best bowling	6/45	6/40	4/33	7/67
Catches/stumpings	4/–	10/–	15/–	23/–
Medal record
Men's Cricket
Representing England
ICC Cricket World Cup
Winner	2019 England and Wales
- Source: ESPNcricinfo, 18 November 2026

Jofra Chioke Archer (born 1 April 1995) is an English cricketer who represents England in all formats as a right-arm fast bowler. In domestic cricket he plays for Sussex as well as a number of T20 franchises. Archer was a member of the England squad that won the 2019 Cricket World Cup. In April 2020, Archer was named as one of the Wisden Cricketers of the Year.

== Early life ==
Jofra Chioke Archer was born on 1 April 1995 in Bridgetown, Barbados. His father Frank Archer is English and his mother Joelle Waithe is Barbadian. He holds British citizenship through his father. Growing up, he attended Christ Church Foundation School near Oistins.

Archer moved to England in 2015, and initially would not have been eligible to play for England until the winter of 2022. The England and Wales Cricket Board (ECB) rules stated that as he did not live in England until after his 18th birthday, he needed to complete a seven-year residency period. Archer played for West Indies Under-19s three times in 2014, but had signalled his intention to make himself available to England once his residency period was complete. However, in November 2018, the ECB announced a change to its rules, reducing the eligibility period from seven years to three to bring it into line with ICC regulations.

== Domestic and franchise career ==
Archer made his first-class debut for Sussex during Pakistan's tour of England in July 2016, and his List A debut later that month against Gloucestershire, in the 2016 Royal London One-Day Cup.

Archer was bought by the Khulna Titans in the 2017 BPL season. Archer played for Hobart Hurricanes in both the 2017–18 and 2018–19 Big Bash League seasons.

He was signed by the Quetta Gladiators as a replacement for Carlos Brathwaite in the 2018 Pakistan Super League draft. He made his PSL debut against Karachi Kings and took 2 wickets. He played two matches in total and pulled out of the remaining tournament due to a side strain.

He was bought by the Rajasthan Royals in the 2018 IPL auction for £800,000. Archer then made his Indian Premier League (IPL) debut on 22 April 2018, against the Mumbai Indians when he took three wickets and was named the player of the match.

During a 2018 t20 Blast match against Middlesex in August 2018, Archer took a hat-trick in the final over of the game.

In 2020, Archer won the IPL Most Valuable Player award despite his team, Rajasthan Royals, finishing bottom of the league. In February 2022, he was bought by the Mumbai Indians in the auction for the 2022 Indian Premier League tournament. In April 2022, he was bought by the Southern Brave for the 2022 season of The Hundred.

== International career ==
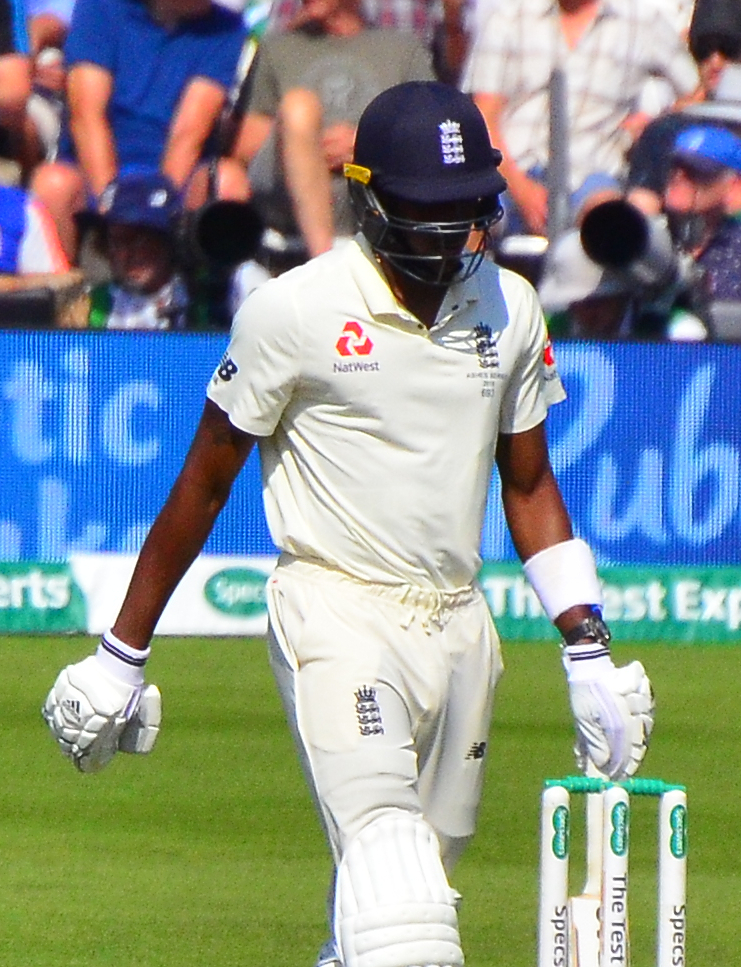
Jofra Archer arrives to bat during 2019 Ashes

In April 2019, Archer was named in England's squads for the limited overs series against Pakistan and the one-off One Day International (ODI) against Ireland. He made his ODI debut for England against Ireland on 3 May 2019. He made his Twenty20 International debut for England against Pakistan on 5 May 2019.

Archer was not included in England's preliminary squad for the 2019 Cricket World Cup. Former England cricketer Andrew Flintoff said he would drop "anyone" from the squad to include Archer. On 21 May 2019, England finalised their squad for the World Cup, with Archer named in the final fifteen-man squad. He played in all England's matches, as they went on to win the Cricket World Cup, with Archer bowling the super over, after the match ended in a tie in the final against New Zealand. Following the World Cup, the International Cricket Council (ICC) named Archer as the rising star of the squad. The ICC also included Archer in their CWC 2019 Team of the Tournament, praising his new ball bowling and his bowling at the death of the innings.

In July 2019, the England and Wales Cricket Board (ECB) named Archer in England's fourteen-man Test squad for the first match of the 2019 Ashes series. However, he was omitted from England's final eleven for the match, after continuing rehabilitation from an injury. Archer was again named in the twelve-man squad for the second Ashes Test, and made his Test debut in the match. He took his first wicket in Test cricket, dismissing Australia's opener Cameron Bancroft. On the first day of the third Test, Archer took his first five-wicket haul in Test cricket, finishing with figures of 6 for 45, with Australia being dismissed for 179 runs. Following the conclusion of the Ashes, Archer was handed his first central contract by the ECB. In April 2020, Archer was named as one of the five Wisden Cricketers of the Year.

Archer was included in England's 30-man squad to start training behind closed doors for the 2020 Test series against the West Indies, and was part of the England team for the first Test match of the series. However, on the morning of the second Test, Archer was dropped from England's squad for the fixture, after he breached biosecurity protocols. As a result, he was placed in isolation for five days, fined, and given a written warning by the ECB. He returned to the team for the third Test, and for two of the three Tests against Pakistan.

In May and December 2021, Archer underwent two operations for an elbow injury, ruling him out of the international team for twelve months. In May 2022, Archer was ruled out of playing during the 2022 English summer due to a back stress fracture. Archer returned to international cricket in 2023, having been selected for England's ODI series against South Africa, and took his best ODI match figures of 6–40 in the third match.

Archer missed the 2023 Ashes series in England after suffering another stress fracture in his right elbow. Archer had returned to the team earlier in 2023 before suffering a recurrence of the injury.

In May 2024, Archer was added to England's squad for the 2024 ICC Men's T20 World Cup tournament, marking his maiden comeback to international cricket following his elbow injury in 2023.

After a nearly four-year absence, Archer was called up to England's Test squad ahead of the third Test at Lord's during India's tour of England in 2025.

In July 2026, Archer was declared Player of the Match for his 3/29 against India in the 3rd T20I match of the home series, restricting India to 76 after England set a target of 202. It was India's second-lowest total in T20Is as well their biggest T20I defeat in terms of runs' margin (125).

== Personal life ==
Archer is a fan of English Premier League team Manchester United FC.
