= Gary Wilson (cricketer) =

Irish cricketer (born 1986)

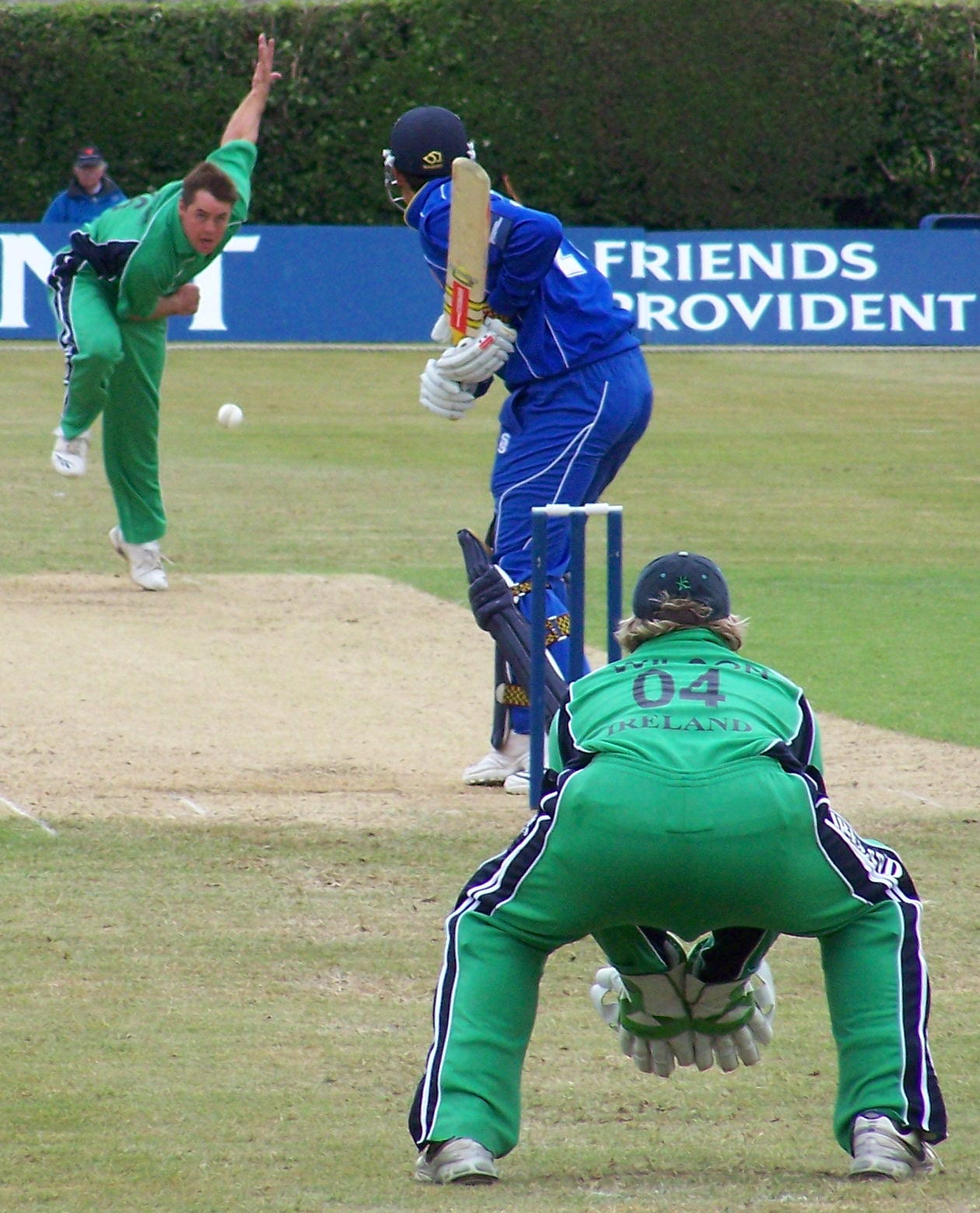
- Gary Wilson keeping against Essex in the Friends Provident Trophy at Castle Avenue in 2007.

Personal information
- Full name: Gary Craig Wilson
- Born: 5 February 1986 (age 40); Dundonald, Northern Ireland
- Nickname: Wils
- Height: 5 ft 10 in (1.78 m)
- Batting: Right-handed
- Bowling: Right-arm medium
- Role: Wicket-keeper

International information
- National side: Ireland (2005–2020)
- Test debut (cap 11): 11 May 2018 v Pakistan
- Last Test: 24 July 2019 v England
- ODI debut (cap 19): 23 June 2007 v India
- Last ODI: 21 May 2019 v Afghanistan
- ODI shirt no.: 14
- T20I debut (cap 11): 2 August 2008 v Scotland
- Last T20I: 19 January 2020 v West Indies
- T20I shirt no.: 14

Domestic team information
- Years: Team
- 2008–2016: Surrey (squad no. 14)
- 2017–2018: Derbyshire (squad no. 9)
- 2018–2020: Northern Knights

Career statistics
Competition	Test	ODI	T20I	FC
Matches	2	105	81	107
Runs scored	45	2,072	1,268	4,834
Batting average	15.00	23.81	21.13	33.56
100s/50s	0/0	1/12	0/3	3/29
Top score	33*	113	65*	160*
Balls bowled	–	–	–	108
Wickets	–	–	–	0
Bowling average	–	–	–	–
5 wickets in innings	–	–	–	–
10 wickets in match	–	–	–	–
Best bowling	–	–	–	–
Catches/stumpings	6/0	73/10	40/7	197/5
- Source: ESPNcricinfo, 21 April 2020

Gary Craig Wilson (born 5 February 1986) is a former Irish cricketer from Northern Ireland, who is a wicket-keeper and right-handed batsman. He played for Ireland in Tests, One Day Internationals and Twenty20 Internationals, with his first appearance for the national side coming in 2005. He was one of the eleven cricketers to play in Ireland's first ever Test match, against Pakistan, in May 2018. In June 2018, he was named captain of Ireland's T20I side, a role he held until November 2019. On 19 March 2021, Wilson announced his retirement from professional cricket. He is the current head coach of the Ireland team.

== Domestic and T20 career ==
Wilson played county cricket for Derbyshire in England's domestic competitions, having previously appeared for Surrey. He had played for Surrey's first team from 2008 to 2016. He was Surrey captain for the latter part of the 2014 season, following injury to Graeme Smith, and was awarded his cap in the same season. Wilson signed a three-year contract with Derbyshire on 19 September 2016, and the following year, he captained the club to the quarterfinals of the T20 Blast, only the second time Derbyshire had gone so far in the competition.

In a match against Leicestershire in August 2010, Wilson scored his maiden first-class century, beating his previous best score of 62. His 125 runs came from 235 balls while batting at number six. It was harder work securing a county starting berth, as he was tried in different top-order positions without consistent success, but Surrey persisted with him in the middle order and he was a regular starter in 2013, making only his second Championship hundred.

Wilson played for the Northern Knights in the 2018 Inter-Provincial Trophy, featuring in one match against Munster Reds at Cork.

In July 2019, he was selected to play for the Belfast Titans in the inaugural edition of the Euro T20 Slam cricket tournament. However, the following month the tournament was cancelled.

== International career ==
Wilson played for Ireland in the 2005 ICC Intercontinental Cup. He made his Irish ODI debut against India on 23 June 2007 at Stormont.

Wilson was selected in Ireland's 15-man squad for the 2011 World Cup. During the tournament it was announced that Wilson had agreed to extend his contract with Surrey to 2012.

In May 2018, he was named in a fourteen-man squad for Ireland's first ever Test match, to be played against Pakistan later that month. He made his Test debut in the match, starting on 11 May 2018. The following month, he was named as the captain of Ireland's Twenty20 International (T20I) squad for the 2018 Netherlands Tri-Nation Series.

In December 2018, he was one of nineteen players to be awarded a central contract by Cricket Ireland for the 2019 season. In January 2020, he was one of nineteen players to be awarded a central contract from Cricket Ireland, the first year in which all contracts were awarded on a full-time basis.

On 3 May 2019, Wilson played in his 100th ODI match, in the one-off fixture between Ireland and England in Malahide. In September 2019, he was named as the captain of Ireland's squad for the 2019 ICC T20 World Cup Qualifier tournament in the United Arab Emirates.

On 10 July 2020, Wilson was named in Ireland's 21-man squad to travel to England to start training behind closed doors for the ODI series against the England cricket team.

On 19 March 2021, Wilson announced his retirement from professional cricket.

== Coaching career ==
In 2026, Wilson was appointed head coach of the Ireland team, having previously worked as assistant to Heinrich Malan.
