= Chris Woakes =

English cricketer (born 1989)

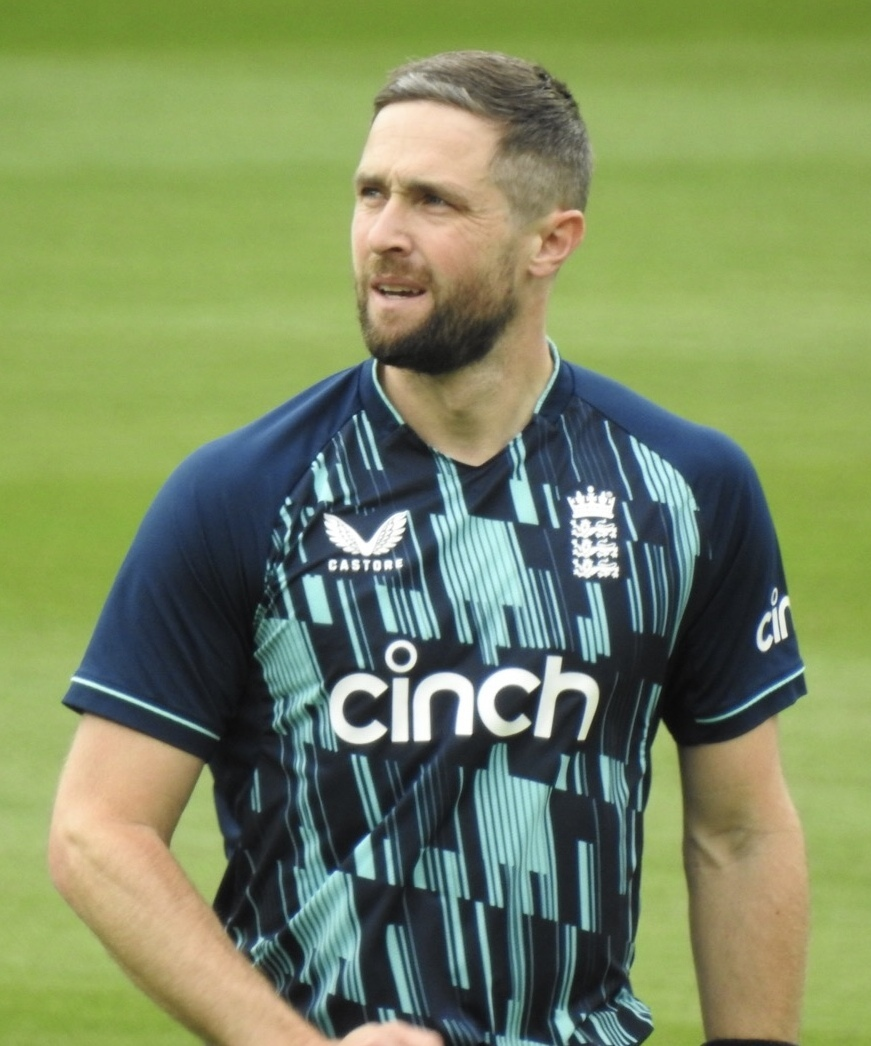
- Woakes playing for England in 2022

Personal information
- Full name: Christopher Roger Woakes
- Born: 2 March 1989 (age 37); Birmingham, West Midlands, England
- Nickname: The Wizard
- Height: 6 ft 2 in (1.88 m)
- Batting: Right-handed
- Bowling: Right-arm fast-medium
- Role: Bowling All-rounder

International information
- National side: England (2011–2025)
- Test debut (cap 657): 21 August 2013 v Australia
- Last Test: 31 July 2025 v India
- ODI debut (cap 217): 21 January 2011 v Australia
- Last ODI: 11 November 2023 v Pakistan
- ODI shirt no.: 19
- T20I debut (cap 51): 12 January 2011 v Australia
- Last T20I: 21 December 2023 v West Indies
- T20I shirt no.: 19

Domestic team information
- Years: Team
- 2006–present: Warwickshire
- 2012/13: Wellington
- 2013/14: Sydney Thunder
- 2017: Kolkata Knight Riders
- 2018: Royal Challengers Bangalore
- 2021: Delhi Capitals
- 2022–2024: Birmingham Phoenix
- 2024: Sharjah Warriors
- 2025–2026: Welsh Fire
- 2026: Sylhet Titans

Career statistics
Competition	Test	ODI	T20I	FC
Matches	62	122	33	193
Runs scored	2,034	1,524	147	7,032
Batting average	25.11	23.81	16.33	30.70
100s/50s	1/7	0/6	0/0	10/28
Top score	137*	95*	37	152*
Balls bowled	11,219	5,737	611	33,194
Wickets	192	173	31	655
Bowling average	29.61	30.01	26.51	25.84
5 wickets in innings	5	3	0	22
10 wickets in match	1	0	0	4
Best bowling	6/17	6/45	3/4	9/36
Catches/stumpings	31/–	50/–	12/–	83/-
Medal record
Men's Cricket
Representing England
ICC Cricket World Cup
Winner	2019 England and Wales
ICC T20 World Cup
Winner	2022 Australia
- Source: ESPNcricinfo, 26 September 2026
- Woakes' voice recorded April 2015

Christopher Roger Woakes (born 2 March 1989) is an English cricketer, a right-handed all-rounder who bowls fast-medium. He plays domestic cricket for Warwickshire and has represented the England national team since making his ODI and T20I debuts in 2011 and his Test debut in 2013 until his international retirement in September 2025. Woakes was part of the England squads that won the 2019 Cricket World Cup and the 2022 T20 World Cup.

== Early life ==
Woakes was born in March 1989 in Birmingham, he attended Barr Beacon Language College in Walsall from 2000 to 2007. He began playing cricket when he was seven years old with Aston Manor Cricket Club before moving to Walmley Cricket Club. He played three games in the 2006 Minor Counties Trophy for Herefordshire County Cricket Club, and played for Warwickshire's under-15, under-17, academy and Second XI teams between 2004 and 2007. Woakes is an avid supporter of local football club Aston Villa F.C. He was a trainee footballer with Walsall F.C. as a winger until the age of 14.

== Career ==
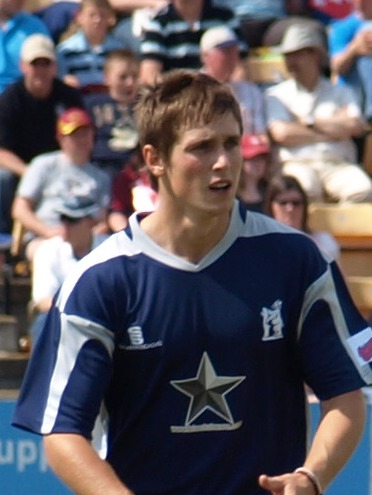
Woakes playing for Warwickshire in 2009

Woakes represented Warwickshire in one match during the 2006 season, during a West Indian tour of England. Woakes picked up three wickets in the match. He has since represented Warwickshire in the Second XI Championship.

He was a regular for the Warwickshire First XI in 2008. He took 42 wickets at an average of 20.57 runs per wicket over the course of the County Championship season, topping Warwickshire's bowling averages.

On 6 April 2009, Woakes was called up to the England Lions squad. Woakes made his Lions debut against the West Indies, taking of 6/43 in the first innings of the match. During the same season he scored 131 not out against Hampshire, his maiden first-class century, batting at number nine and sharing a 222-run partnership with Jonathan Trott.

Woakes claimed his 200th first-class wicket in Warwickshire's victory over Sussex in the County Championship in July 2011.

In the 2017 Indian Premier League auction, Woakes was bought by Kolkata Knight Riders, going on to take 17 wickets in 13 matches, with best figures of 3/6. In the 2018 IPL auction, he was bought by Royal Challengers Bangalore, playing in five matches and taking eight wickets in the 2018 IPL. He was released by RCB ahead of the 2019 IPL auction, where he went unsold.

In the 2020 IPL auction, he was bought by Delhi Capitals ahead of the 2020 Indian Premier League, but pulled out of the tournament. Chris Woakes has pulled out of IPL 2020 to keep himself fresh for England Test season. He was retained by Delhi for the 2021 season. Woakes made his Delhi Capitals debut vs CSK in match 2 of IPL 2021.

In April 2022, he was bought by the Birmingham Phoenix for the 2022 season of The Hundred.

== International career ==
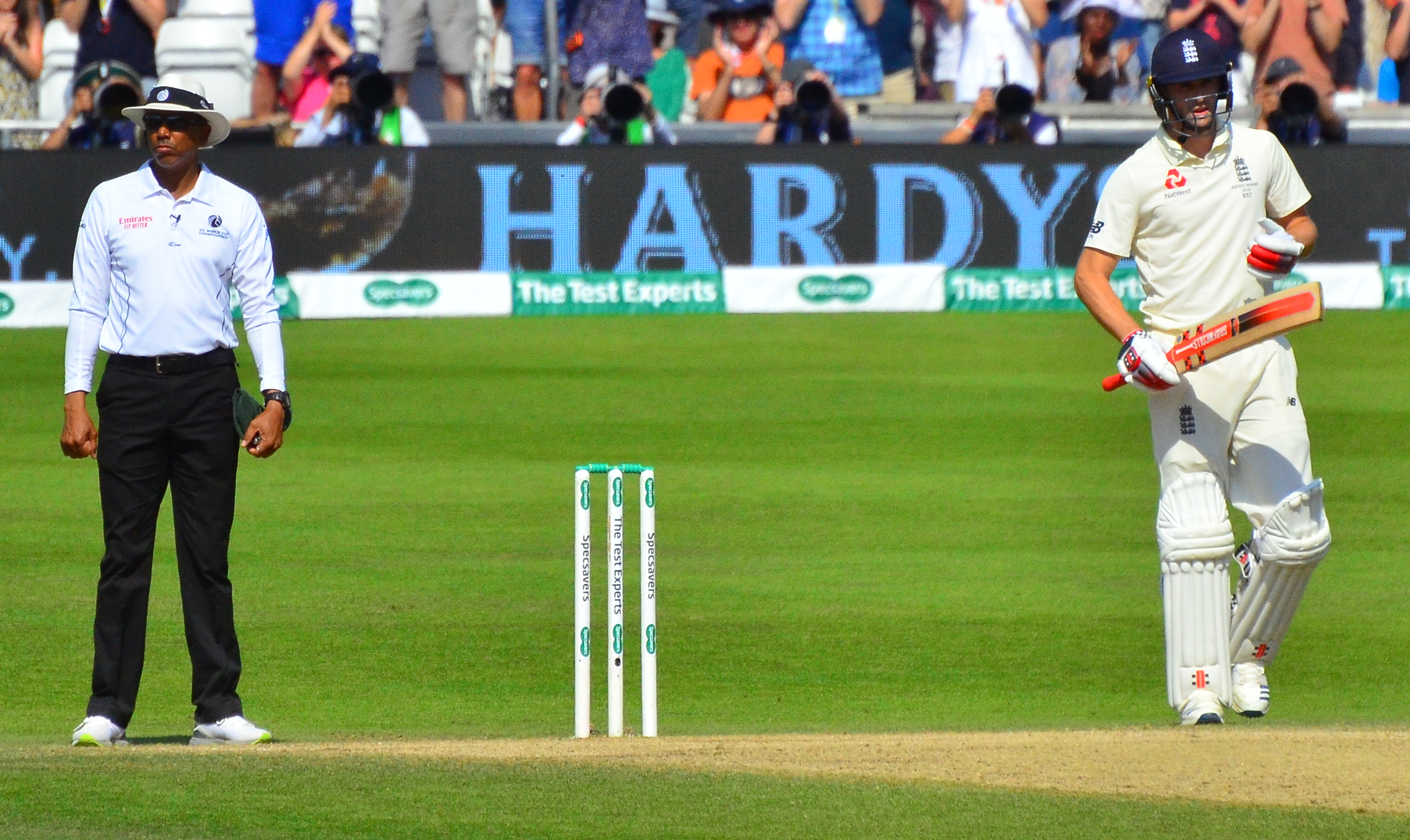
Woakes during the third Ashes Test at Headingley.

Woakes made his International Twenty20 debut on 12 January 2011 against Australia in Adelaide. Opening the bowling, he took figures of 1/34 and later scored the winning runs. He featured throughout the one-day matches on the tour, and in his second One Day International took figures of 6/45. Woakes returned to the England set up in 2012 during an ODI series against South Africa and continued to feature in the one-day team against India and New Zealand in early 2013.

Woakes made his Test match debut against Australia in the final Test of the 2013 Ashes series, taking 1/96 in the first innings. After being named in squads against Sri Lanka and India, Woakes played his first Test of the 2014 summer in the third Test against India. He was an integral part of England's ODI team, playing all four matches and was selected in the ODI squad that toured Sri Lanka towards the end of 2014. England toured without injured senior bowlers Stuart Broad and James Anderson, meaning Woakes was trusted with the new ball. He took figures of 6/47 in the fifth match of the series, a bowling spell which was nominated to be one of the best ODI bowling performance of the year by ESPNcricinfo.

He was part of the England team for the 2015 Cricket World Cup, although injury ruled him out of England's final match of the tournament. After the injury, Woakes returned for the ODI series against Australia and Pakistan and the Test team against South Africa in 2015/16. On 21 June 2016, he scored his highest ODI score of unbeaten 95 runs in the first ODI against Sri Lanka. His score is the joint highest ODI score by number eight or lower in ODI history, a record that he shares with fellow Englishman, Sam Curran. He made his first Test century against India (137 not out) at Lord's in August 2018, the ground where two years earlier he had his best match figures with the ball of 11/102 against Pakistan. These feats earned him a position on both Lord's honours boards, one of only ten players to achieve this, and the fifth to do so by taking ten wickets in a match.

He has continued to feature in England's one-day and Test squads, and in April 2019 was named in England's squad for the 2019 Cricket World Cup. He was named the Player of the Match in the World Cup semi-final against Australia, taking three wickets to see England through to the World Cup Final against New Zealand, the team's first appearance in a final since 1992. Woakes again took three wickets in the final as England won the tournament.

On 17 June 2020, Woakes was included in England's 30-man squad to start training behind closed doors for the Test series against the West Indies, and was later named in England's thirteen-man squad for the first Test match of the series. In the second Test, Woakes took his 100th wicket in Test matches. Chris Woakes reached 150 ODI wickets in his career by taking the wicket of Pathum Nissanka in the 1st ODI of Sri Lankas tour of England in 2021.

In September 2021, Woakes was named in England's squad for the 2021 ICC Men's T20 World Cup. In September 2022, Woakes was named in England's squad for the 2022 ICC Men's T20 World Cup. Woakes played in every game for England who went on to win the tournament, beating Pakistan in the final. Woakes is one of 6 players to play in both the 2019 ODI and 2022 T20 world cup winning squads.

In 2023, Woakes was recalled to the 2023 Ashes for the 3rd Test at Headingley where he took three wickets in each innings. In the second innings he finished 32 not out and hit the winning runs. His 59 run partnership with Harry Brook was England's largest of the match. For his performances in the series, taking crucial wickets at key stages and picking up 19 wickets in the 6 innings he played, he was named England's "player of the series".

In June 2025, Woakes was named in England's 14-man squad for the test series against India. where he played a full part up till the fifth test, where he suffered a shoulder dislocation during play. In September 2025, after not being named in England's 2025 Ashes squad, Woakes announced his retirement from international cricket.
