= Liam Plunkett =

English cricketer (born 1985)

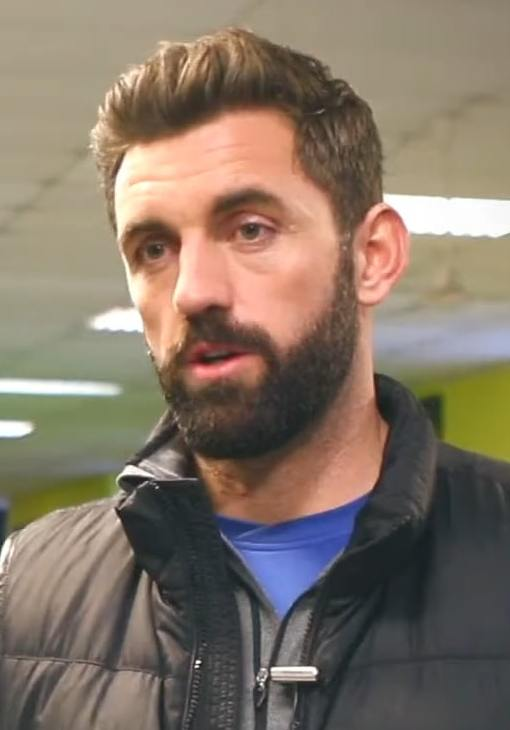
- Plunkett in 2017

Personal information
- Full name: Liam Edward Plunkett
- Born: 6 April 1985 (age 41); Nunthorpe, Middlesbrough, England
- Height: 6 ft 3 in (1.91 m)
- Batting: Right-handed
- Bowling: Right-arm fast medium
- Role: Bowling All Rounder

International information
- National side: England (2005–2019)
- Test debut (cap 628): 29 November 2005 v Pakistan
- Last Test: 17 July 2014 v India
- ODI debut (cap 190): 10 December 2005 v Pakistan
- Last ODI: 14 July 2019 v New Zealand
- ODI shirt no.: 17
- T20I debut (cap 16): 15 June 2006 v Sri Lanka
- Last T20I: 8 March 2019 v West Indies

Domestic team information
- Years: Team
- 2003–2012: Durham
- 2007/08: Dolphins
- 2013–2018: Yorkshire
- 2017: Sylhet Sixers
- 2018: Delhi Daredevils
- 2018/19: Melbourne Stars
- 2019: Chattogram Challengers
- 2019–2021: Surrey (squad no. 29)
- 2021: Welsh Fire (squad no. 29)
- 2023–2025: San Francisco Unicorns

Career statistics
Competition	Test	ODI	FC	LA
Matches	13	89	158	215
Runs scored	238	646	4,378	1,677
Batting average	15.86	20.83	24.73	20.20
100s/50s	0/1	0/1	3/22	0/3
Top score	55*	56	126	72
Balls bowled	2,659	4,137	23,909	9,275
Wickets	41	135	453	283
Bowling average	37.46	29.70	31.86	30.36
5 wickets in innings	1	1	11	1
10 wickets in match	0	0	1	0
Best bowling	5/64	5/52	6/33	5/52
Catches/stumpings	3/–	26/–	86/–	64/–
Medal record
Men's Cricket
Representing England
ICC Cricket World Cup
Winner	2019 England and Wales
ICC T20 World Cup
Runner-up	2016 India
- Source: ESPNcricinfo, 9 August 2025

Liam Edward Plunkett (born 6 April 1985) is an English cricketer who bowls right-arm fast medium. He was an England international until 2019, and was part of the squad that won the 2019 Cricket World Cup. He most recently played domestic cricket for Surrey County Cricket Club and Welsh Fire. He currently plays for Minor League Cricket team The Philadelphians.

In the 2005 season he was Durham's leading first-class wicket-taker, and that year was called up to the England squad to tour Pakistan in November and December where he played his first Tests and One Day Internationals (ODIs). Between November 2005 and June 2007 Plunkett played 9 Test and 27 ODIs before being dropped by England.

In 2011 and 2012, Plunkett struggled with form and played just three Championship matches for Durham. Looking for a fresh start he changed clubs, moving from Durham to Yorkshire for the start of the 2013 season. Under the tutelage of Yorkshire coach and former Australia fast bowler Jason Gillespie, Plunkett's fortunes improved and he was awarded his county cap in 2013. The following year, Plunkett was recalled to the England Test team.

Primarily a bowler, Plunkett also has two first-class centuries to his name and a batting average of about 24. As proof of his worth as a tailender, after just 18 ODI games he held a part of both the 8th and 9th wicket partnership records for England.

== Domestic career ==
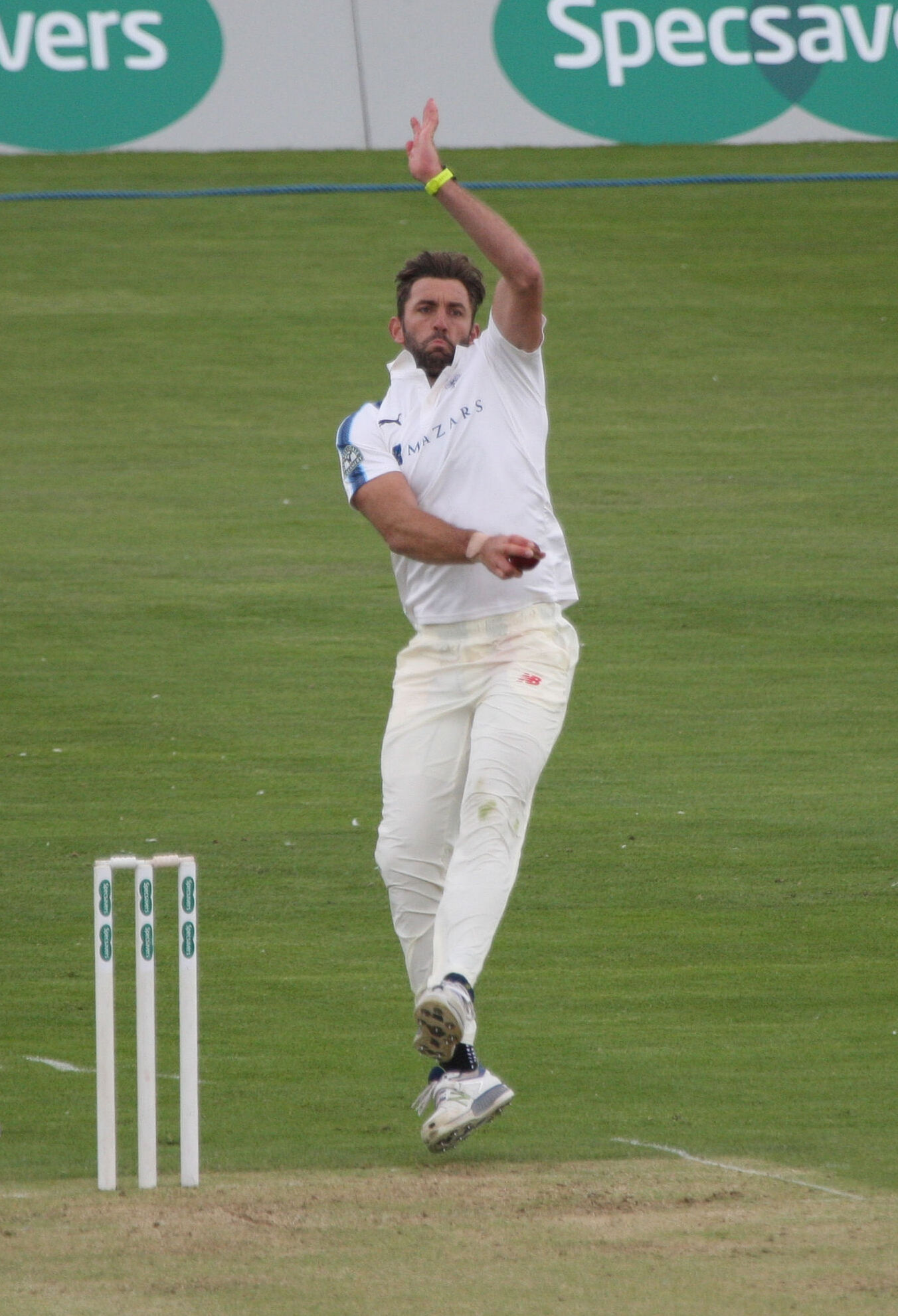
Plunkett bowling for Yorkshire CCC in 2017

Plunkett started his career with Durham, making his debut for the senior team in 2003 having played for the club's academy. He took 19 first-class wickets in his debut season, followed by 31 in his second. In 2005 he improved his bowling in the limited overs form of the game, averaging 29.10 and taking 19 wickets. In 2006 he averaged 27.15 in the County Championship as his reputation grew. He remained consistent in the County Championship in 2007, averaging just over 30.

Plunkett signed for the Nashua Dolphins in November 2007; fellow Durham fast bowler Steve Harmison signed for Highveld Lions. Harmison and Plunkett played against each other in a four-day match on 15–18 November 2007.

He was part of the Durham team which won the County Championship in 2008 for the first time in their history. He averaged 32.50 with the ball and 27.28 with the bat. In 2009 Durham retained the title, with Plunkett averaging 39 with the ball and 38.94 with bat.

In 2011 and 2012, Plunkett struggled with form and played just three Championship matches for Durham. In October 2012, Plunkett signed to play for Yorkshire. He stated, "At this stage of my career, I believe that a fresh challenge would benefit me and I feel this is required to help me reach my goal of representing my country again". In his first season at Yorkshire, Plunkett played in 12 of the club's 16 matches in the County Championship, managing to take 36 wickets. He credits Jason Gillespie, Yorkshire's coach and former Australia international fast bowler, with helping him regain his confidence and felt that his problems had been exacerbated by over-coaching. In an interview in June 2014 Plunkett explained "Different coaches told me different things and when you're a youngster you're like a sponge and take a lot of things in. ... When I came to Yorkshire, Jason Gillespie just told me to run it and bowl quick. And when I did that I backed myself, bowled in my good areas and started picking up wickets." Under the tutelage of Yorkshire coach and former Australia fast bowler Jason Gillespie, Plunkett's fortunes improved and he was awarded his county cap in 2013. The following year, Plunkett was recalled to the England Test team.

In April 2018, Plunkett received his maiden IPL call up, when he was signed by the Delhi Daredevils as a replacement for the injured Kagiso Rabada.

On 31 August 2021, Plunkett officially signed with Major League Cricket for its proposed inaugural season in 2023, cutting short his contract with Surrey in the process Until then, he will play for The Philadelphians of Minor League Cricket beginning in the summer of 2022.

== International career ==
=== 2005 Pakistan and India ===
Plunkett was called up for the England One Day International and Test squads to tour Pakistan in November & December 2005 after an injury to Simon Jones. He made his Test debut in the third Test of that series in Lahore taking figures of 2–125 in the innings defeat. Plunkett came on as a Super Sub in his first ODI on 10 December 2005 after Kevin Pietersen went off with a back injury. Plunkett finished with England's best bowling figures, taking 3 wickets for 51 runs, and he was also involved in the run out of Shoaib Akhtar. They were three of the last six wickets, which fell for 23 as England went on to win the match by 42 runs. Two days later, when Plunkett entered the crease, England's score was a disappointing 130 for 8 in the second ODI. He added 56 runs to the total in a record ninth-wicket 100 run partnership with Vikram Solanki before chipping a return catch to Shoaib Akhtar. England needed to keep the Pakistani run rate below five an over, however, after setting a target of 231, but Plunkett's seven overs went for 63 – Kamran Akmal taking 39 off the 25 balls Plunkett bowled to him.

He was subsequently taken on the 2005–06 tour to India. He played in the second Test at Mohali, replacing Ian Blackwell in the team. However, he was largely unimpressive, taking only one wicket and scoring just one run over two innings. He was replaced by James Anderson for the third Test.

=== 2006/07 Sri Lanka, New Zealand and Australia ===
Injuries to Steve Harmison, Anderson and Jones meant Plunkett started the first Test of the Sri Lankan tour of England in the summer of 2006. He failed to impress in the first test, taking figures of 0–52 and 1–85. However, he achieved what was at the time his best figures when taking three wickets before lunch against in the second Test at Edgbaston. This included a double wicket maiden in his first over of the day, dismissing Michael Vandort and Mahela Jayawardene. In the final match of the series Plunkett took two wickets in each innings as Sri Lanka won by 134 runs.

Plunkett made his international Twenty20 debut on 15 June 2006 against Sri Lanka, taking 1–37 from four overs; he did not bat. In the first Test against Pakistan, Plunkett took figures of 2–78 and 0–41.

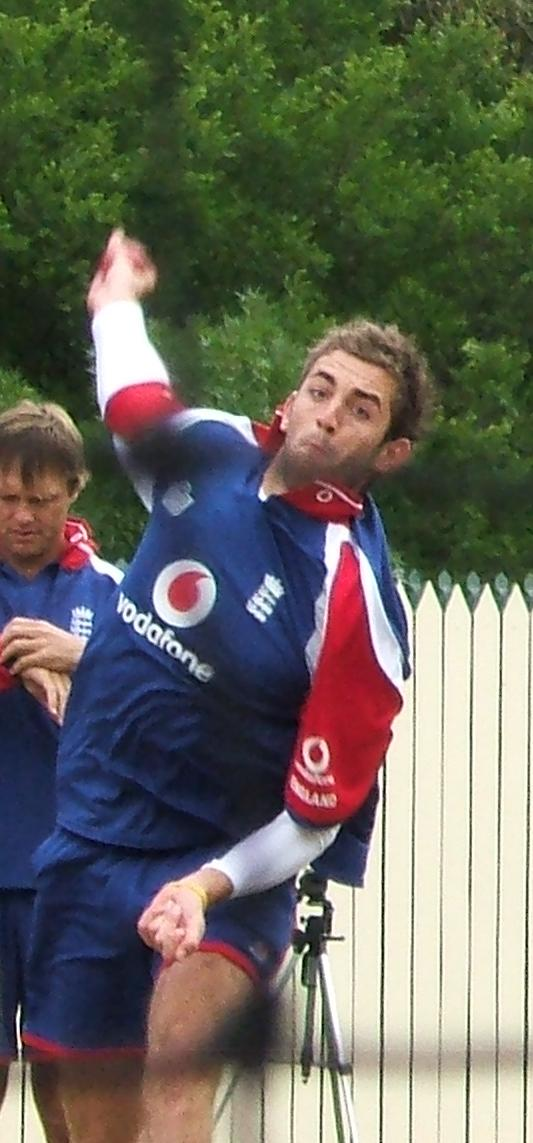
Plunkett bowls in the Adelaide Oval nets during the 2006-07 Ashes series

He was in the squad for the 2006-07 Ashes series, but did not play in a Test.

Plunkett did not feature in another ODI match until 30 January 2007, against New Zealand in Perth, Australia during the Commonwealth Series. He took 3 wickets for 54 runs in 9 overs. He was also picked in the next game against Australia on 2 February 2007 in Sydney. He took 3 wickets for 34 runs off 9.5 overs. Perhaps the highlight of Plunkett's bowling was the wicket of stand in captain and wicket-keeper Adam Gilchrist. Plunkett bowled Gilchrist with the very first ball of Australia's innings. He also took the wickets of Michael Clarke and Glenn McGrath. In the next game of the Commonwealth series, against New Zealand, Plunkett took figures of 3–60. He was wicket less in the first of two finals against Australia, although England won the game. In the second final he made 8 not out and took figures of 3–43 in 6 overs as England won the Commonwealth series.

=== 2007 World Cup and West Indies ===
He was selected in the England squad for the 2007 ICC World Cup. He made 29 not out against New Zealand, and took figures of 1–43. He also played in the group match against Canada, taking 2–46 as England won by 51 runs. As England progresses to the Super Eights stage of the tournament, Plunkett found it difficult to hold down a place. His final game of the tournament came against West Indies, but he was expensive, taking 1–71 in just 7 overs as England narrowly won by 1 wicket.

He was selected in the 12-man squad to play in the first Test in the 2007 West Indies tour of England. He took 2–107 as the match finished in a draw. He kept his place for the next match of the series, where he took 3–35 and 1–25. The third match of the series proved to be Plunkett's last test appearance for England for the next five years. He took figures of 1–43 and 0–57 in a convincing England victory.

=== 2010/11 Bangladesh and Australia ===
Plunkett made a brief return to the England set up in 2010 ODI match against Bangladesh. England won the match by 45 runs, but Plunkett only bowled two overs, conceding 12 runs. He also played in the final ODI against Australia in 2011, taking figures of 2–49 of his ten overs and making 20 from 32 balls, as Australia won the game by 57 runs.

=== 2014 Sri Lanka and India ===
On 5 June 2014 Plunkett was recalled for the two-match series against Sri Lanka as part of a 12-man squad. Plunkett was picked based on his good from in the County Championship and played in the first match as an impact bowler, bowling short deliveries in an attempt to unsettle the batsmen. He took figures of 2–166 and 0–39. In the second match, Plunkett recorded Test-best figures of 5–64 in first innings of the second Test at Headingley. He also bowled well in the second innings, taking 4–112.

Plunkett kept his place in the squad for the series against India. He took three wickets in the first Test at Trent Bridge as the match ended in a draw. He scored his maiden half-century in the first innings of the second Test at Lord's and finished the match with four wickets, including 3–65 in India's second innings. England ended up losing the Test and injury kept Plunkett out of the remainder of the series, which England eventually won 3–1.

=== 2015 New Zealand ===
Plunkett returned to the team for the ODI series against New Zealand. He took figures of 0–37 in the first game as England secured a comfortable win. In the second game he took figures of 1–71 and made 44 with the bat as England suffered a narrow defeat. Injury ruled Plunkett out of the rest of the series, which England won 3–2.

=== 2015 Australia and Pakistan ===
Plunkett played in the second ODI against Australia. He scored 24 with the bat but failed to pick up a wicket. He kept his place for the next match and took figures of 3–60 as England won by 93 runs. He took 2–47 in the fourth ODI which England again won, this time by three wickets. England went on to lose the series 3–2, with Plunkett playing in both of the victories.

Plunkett played in two T20Is against Pakistan and performed well in both of them. He took figures of 3–21 in the first match of the series and 3–33 in the second match. Plunkett's performances ensured he was selected in the World T20 squad. He also set the record for most consecutive matches missed for a team between appearances(74)

=== 2016 World T20 ===
After not playing in the first two group games, Plunkett came into the team against Afghanistan and took figures of 0–12 in an economical spell. He picked up his first wicket of the tournament in the next match against Sri Lanka, taking figures of 1–23. He was more expensive in the semi-final against New Zealand, but did still pick up a wicket as England went on to secure a victory by a margin of seven wickets. In the final, Plunkett finished with figures of 0–29 as England finished as runners-up.

=== 2016 Sri Lanka and Pakistan ===
In the first ODI against Sri Lanka, Plunkett took figures of 2–67 and scored an unbeaten 22, which included a six of the last ball to secure a tie for England. In the second match he took 2–49 as England won by ten wickets. The third match of the series was abandoned due to rain, but Plunkett took 3–46 in Sri Lanka's innings before the rain came. He did not pick up a wicket in the fourth match of the series, which England won by 6 wickets. However, in the final game he again found himself amongst the wickets, taking figures of 3–44 to help England win the series 3–0. Plunkett played in the only T20I between the two teams, taking figures of 2–27 to help restrict Sri Lanka to 140 as England won the match by eight wickets.

Plunkett played in the first ODI against Pakistan, taking figures of 1–52 as England got off to a winning start. In the second ODI he took 2–50 as England made it two wins from two. He took figures of 1–30 in the third ODI which England won by 169 runs after setting a new world record high score with the bat. In the fourth ODI he took figures of 1–61 as England won by four wickets after restricting Pakistan to 251. Plunkett did not play in the final match of the series, which England lost. Plunkett played in the only T20I between the two teams, as England lost by nine wickets, with Plunkett taking 0–24.

=== 2016 Bangladesh ===
Plunkett was selected in the ODI squad to face Bangladesh. He did not play in the first two matches, but played in the third match, taking figures of 0–51 as England won by four wickets to win the series 2–1.

=== 2017 India ===
Plunkett played in the second ODI against India, and took figures of 2–91 as India posted 381/6. He then made an unbeaten 26 with the bat as England lost by 15 runs. In the third ODI he took figures of 1–65 as England won by 5 runs, although they lost the series 2–1. In the first T20I he took figures of 1–32 as England won by seven wickets. In the third T20I he took figures of 1–22 as England lost by 75 runs.

=== 2017 West Indies ===
Plunkett took figures of 4–40 in the first ODI against the West Indies as England won by 45 runs. In the second ODI he took figures of 3–32 in the second match as the West Indies were restricted to 225 and England won by four wickets. In the final match of the series he took 3–27 as England secured a convincing 186 run victory.

=== 2019 Cricket World Cup and beyond ===
In April 2019, he was named in England's squad for the 2019 Cricket World Cup, which England won. He was a crucial part for England in the final, taking three wickets, including New Zealand captain Kane Williamson. This was his last international appearance; in May 2020 he was left out of the England training squad for their internationals that summer. Plunkett, who is married to an American woman, later said that he would be open to the idea of playing for the United States cricket team. However, he would have to serve a three-year residency period before becoming eligible to represent the team, and he later stated that he was not intending to qualify for the team.

== Baseball career ==
Plunkett joined the Oakland Ballers of the Pioneer Baseball League under the PBL's "marketing player" exception. He made his professional debut as a pitcher for the club at their home stadium, Raimondi Park, on 26 June 2026, throwing five pitches and striking out one batter in a loss against the Yuba-Sutter Freebirds.

== Personal life ==
Plunkett married his wife, Emeleah, in October 2018.

In February 2007, he was banned from driving for twenty months, after being convicted for a drink-driving offence in October 2006. In August 2012 he was convicted of a second drink-driving offence and banned from driving for 40 months.
