= 2025 International League T20 =

Third season of the ILT20

- Dates: 11 January – 9 February 2025
- Administrator: Emirates Cricket Board
- Cricket format: Twenty20
- Tournament format(s): Double round-robin and Playoffs
- Champions: Dubai Capitals (1st title)
- Runners-up: Desert Vipers
- Participants: 6
- Matches: 34
- Player of the series: Sam Curran (Desert Vipers)
- Most runs: Shai Hope (527) (Dubai Capitals)
- Most wickets: Fazalhaq Farooqi (21) (MI Emirates)
- Official website: www.ilt20.ae

The 2025 International League T20, also known as DP World ILT20 2025 for sponsorship reasons, was the third season of the International League T20, a professional Twenty20 cricket league, organised by the Emirates Cricket Board in the United Arab Emirates. The tournament started on 11 January and the final was played on 9 February 2025. MI Emirates were the defending champions.

In the final, Dubai Capitals defeated Desert Vipers by 4 wickets to win their maiden title.

== Background ==
The 2025 season clashed with the Big Bash League, Super Smash, Bangladesh Premier League and SA20.

The 2025 International League T20 was a professional T20 tournament featuring men's franchise cricket teams, organized by the Emirates Cricket Board. The tournament was first played in 2023. The previous edition of the tournament, held in 2024, was contested by six teams. The defending champions were MI Emirates, who had defeated Dubai Capitals in the final of the previous edition.

== Squads ==
Teams had the option of retaining players or acquiring new signings.

Abu Dhabi Knight Riders	Desert Vipers	Dubai Capitals	Gulf Giants	MI Emirates	Sharjah Warriorz
Head coaches
(Trinidad and Tobago) Dwayne Bravo	(United Kingdom) James Foster	(India) Hemang Badani	(Zimbabwe) Andy Flower	(India) Robin Singh	(South Africa) JP Duminy
Captains
(Trinidad and Tobago) Sunil Narine	(New Zealand) Lockie Ferguson	(Australia) David Warner	(United Kingdom) James Vince	(Trinidad and Tobago) Nicholas Pooran	(New Zealand) Tim Southee
Players
(Jamaica) Andre Russell; (United Kingdom) Joe Clarke; (United Kingdom) David Willey; (Sri Lanka) Charith Asalanka; (United Kingdom) Michael Pepper; (United Kingdom) Laurie Evans; (United States) Ali Khan; (Trinidad and Tobago) Terrance Hinds; (United States) Andries Gous; (United Arab Emirates) Alishan Sharafu; (United Arab Emirates) Adhitya Shetty; (Barbados) Kyle Mayers; (Barbados) Jason Holder; (Barbados) Roston Chase; (United Arab Emirates) Shahid Bhutta; (Sri Lanka) Vijayakanth Viyaskanth; (Guyana) Gudakesh Motie; (Pakistan) Hassan Khan; (Pakistan) Ibrar Ahmed; (United Kingdom) Phil Salt; (United Arab Emirates) Ismat Alam	(United Kingdom) Alex Hales; (Pakistan) Mohammad Amir; (Netherlands) Bas de Leede; (Afghanistan) Rahmanullah Gurbaz; (Sri Lanka) Wanindu Hasaranga; (United Kingdom) Max Holden; (United Kingdom) Adam Hose; (United Kingdom) Michael Jones; (Pakistan) Azam Khan; (United Kingdom) Dan Lawrence; (Nepal) Kushal Malla; (United Arab Emirates) Ali Naseer; (United Kingdom) David Payne; (Guyana) Sherfane Rutherford; (United Kingdom) Nathan Sowter; (United Arab Emirates) Tanish Suri; (United Kingdom) Luke Wood; (Pakistan) Fakhar Zaman; (United Kingdom) Sam Curran; (United Arab Emirates) Dhruv Parashar; (United Arab Emirates) Khuzaima Tanveer; (United Arab Emirates) Rahul Chopra	(Pakistan) Haider Ali; (United Kingdom) Sam Billings; (Australia) Joe Burns; (Sri Lanka) Dushmantha Chameera; (Barbados) Shai Hope; (Afghanistan) Zahir Khan; (New Zealand) Scott Kuggeleijn; (Saint Vincent and the Grenadines) Obed McCoy; (Australia) Jake Fraser-McGurk; (United Kingdom) Brandon McMullen; (Afghanistan) Gulbadin Naib; (Jamaica) Rovman Powell; (United Arab Emirates) Akif Raja; (Zimbabwe) Sikandar Raza; (United Kingdom) Adam Rossington; (Sri Lanka) Dasun Shanaka; (United Kingdom) Olly Stone; (Sri Lanka) Jeffrey Vandersay; (United Kingdom) Joe Weatherley; (Afghanistan) Najibullah Zadran; (United Arab Emirates) Farhan Khan; (United Arab Emirates) Zeeshan Naseer; (United Arab Emirates) Ayman Ahamed; (United Arab Emirates) Ammar Badami; (United Arab Emirates) Ankur Sangwan; (United Arab Emirates) Jash Giyanai	(Ireland) Mark Adair; (United Kingdom) Rehan Ahmed; (United Kingdom) Jordan Cox; (United Kingdom) Tom Curran; (Australia) Tim David; (Dominica) Dominic Drakes; (Namibia) Gerhard Erasmus; (Guyana) Shimron Hetmyer; (United Kingdom) Chris Jordan; (United Arab Emirates) Aayan Afzal Khan; (United Kingdom) Adam Lyth; (United Kingdom) Tymal Mills; (Zimbabwe) Blessing Muzarabani; (United Kingdom) Jamie Overton; (Nepal) Dipendra Singh Airee; (United Kingdom) Jamie Smith; (Australia) Daniel Worrall; (Afghanistan) Ibrahim Zadran; (Afghanistan) Wahidullah Zadran; (United Arab Emirates) Zuhaib Zubair; (United Arab Emirates) Uzair Khan; (Bangladesh) Omid Shafi Rahman; (United Arab Emirates) Maroof Merchant; (United Arab Emirates) Harshit Seth	(Afghanistan) Fareed Ahmad; (United Kingdom) Tom Banton; (United Kingdom) Ben Charlesworth; (United States) Thomas Draca; (Afghanistan) Fazalhaq Farooqi; (Grenada) Andre Fletcher; (Trinidad and Tobago) Akeal Hosein; (Antigua and Barbuda) Alzarri Joseph; (United States) Nosthush Kenjige; (United Kingdom) Dan Mousley; (United Kingdom) Jonny Bairstow; (Trinidad and Tobago) Kieron Pollard; (United Arab Emirates) Muhammad Rohid Khan; (Afghanistan) Waqar Salamkheil; (Guyana) Romario Shepherd; (United Kingdom) Jordan Thompson; (United Arab Emirates) Muhammad Waseem; (United Arab Emirates) Aryan Lakra; (United Arab Emirates) Zahoor Khan; (United Arab Emirates) Syed Haider; (United Arab Emirates) Simranjeet Kang; (Afghanistan) Allah Mohammad Ghazanfar; (United Kingdom) Will Jacks	(United Kingdom) Tom Kohler-Cadmore; (United Kingdom) Jason Roy; (Saint Lucia) Johnson Charles; (Sri Lanka) Bhanuka Rajapaksa; (Sri Lanka) Avishka Fernando; (Malaysia) Virandeep Singh; (United Arab Emirates) Ethan D'Souza; (Sri Lanka) Dilshan Madushanka; (New Zealand) Adam Milne; (United Arab Emirates) Junaid Siddique; (United Kingdom) Adil Rashid; (Australia) Ashton Agar; (United Arab Emirates) Muhammad Jawadullah; (United Arab Emirates) Traveen Mathew; (Australia) Daniel Sams; (United Kingdom) Luke Wells; (Guyana) Keemo Paul; (United States) Harmeet Singh; (Afghanistan) Karim Janat; (United Arab Emirates) Rohan Mustafa; (Australia) Matthew Wade; (New Zealand) Tim Seifert; (Australia) Adam Zampa; (United Kingdom) Moeen Ali

== Venues ==

United Arab Emirates
Dubai	Sharjah	Abu Dhabi
Dubai International Cricket Stadium	Sharjah Cricket Stadium	Sheikh Zayed Cricket Stadium
Capacity: 25,000	Capacity: 16,000	Capacity: 20,000

== Teams and standings ==
=== Points table ===
Pos	Team	Pld	W	L	NR	Pts	NRR	Qualification
1	Desert Vipers (R)	10	7	3	0	14	0.141	Advance to Qualifier 1
2	Dubai Capitals (C)	10	6	4	0	12	−0.234	Advance to Qualifier 1
3	MI Emirates (4th)	10	5	5	0	10	0.805	Advance to Eliminator
4	Sharjah Warriorz (3rd)	10	5	5	0	10	−0.349	Advance to Eliminator
5	Gulf Giants	10	4	6	0	8	−0.230	Eliminated
6	Abu Dhabi Knight Riders	10	3	7	0	6	−0.229	Eliminated

Source: ESPNCricinfo
(C) Champions; (R) Runners-up

=== Match summary ===
Team	Group matches										Playoffs		
Team	1	2	3	4	5	6	7	8	9	10	Q1/E	Q2	F
Abu Dhabi Knight Riders	0	2	2	4	4	6	6	6	6	6			
Desert Vipers	2	4	6	8	8	10	12	12	14	14	L	W	L
Dubai Capitals	2	2	2	2	4	6	8	8	10	12	W		W
Gulf Giants	0	0	2	2	2	4	6	6	6	8			
MI Emirates	0	2	2	4	6	6	6	8	10	10	L		
Sharjah Warriorz	2	2	4	4	4	4	4	6	8	10	W	L	

Win	Loss	No result

- Note: The total points at the end of each group match are listed.
- Note: Click on the points (group matches) or W/L (playoffs) to see the match summary.

Visitor team →	ADKR	DV	DC	GG	MIE	SW
Home team ↓	ADKR	DV	DC	GG	MIE	SW
Abu Dhabi Knight Riders		Vipers; 7 wickets	Dubai; 8 wickets	Giants; 7 wickets	Emirates; 28 runs	Abu Dhabi; 30 runs
Desert Vipers	Vipers; 53 runs		Dubai; 9 wickets	Vipers; 5 wickets	Vipers; 5 wickets	Vipers; 10 wickets
Dubai Capitals	Dubai; 26 runs	Dubai; 6 wickets		Dubai; 5 wickets	Dubai; 1 run	Sharjah; 9 wickets
Gulf Giants	Abu Dhabi; 37 runs	Vipers; 6 wickets	Giants; 6 wickets		Emirates; 5 wickets	Sharjah; 3 wickets
MI Emirates	Abu Dhabi; 42 runs	Emirates; 154 runs	Emirates; 26 runs	Giants; 2 wickets		Sharjah; 8 wickets
Sharjah Warriorz	Sharjah; 4 wickets	Vipers; 8 wickets	Sharjah; 5 wickets	Giants; 6 wickets	Emirates; 9 wickets	

Home team won	Visitor team won

- Note: Results listed are according to the home (horizontal) and visitor (vertical) teams.
- Note: Click on a result to see a summary of the match.

== League stage ==
Match 1
11 January 2025
18:00 (N)
Scorecard

Dubai Capitals; 133/8 (20 overs)	v	MI Emirates; 132/7 (20 overs)
Brandon McMullen 58 (42); Fazalhaq Farooqi 5/16 (4 overs)		Nicholas Pooran 61 (40); Gulbadin Naib 3/13 (4 overs)

Dubai Capitals won by 1 run
Dubai International Cricket Stadium, Dubai
Umpires: Shiju Sam (UAE) and Simon Taufel (Aus)
Player of the match: Gulbadin Naib (Dubai Capitals)

- MI Emirates won the toss and elected to field.
- Farhan Khan (Dubai Capitals) made his T20 debut.

Match 2
12 January 2025
14:00
Scorecard

Abu Dhabi Knight Riders; 166/5 (20 overs)	v	Desert Vipers; 168/3 (18.4 overs)
Phil Salt 71* (49); Lockie Ferguson 1/26 (4 overs)		Dan Lawrence 70 (39); Andre Russell 1/15 (2 overs)

Desert Vipers won by 7 wickets
Sheikh Zayed Cricket Stadium, Abu Dhabi
Umpires: Adrian Holdstock (SA) and Bismillah Jan Shinwari (Afg)
Player of the match: Dan Lawrence (Desert Vipers)

- Desert Vipers won the toss and elected to field.
- Shahid Bhutta (Abu Dhabi Knight Riders) made his T20 debut.

Match 3
12 January 2025
18:00 (N)
Scorecard

Gulf Giants; 174/7 (20 overs)	v	Sharjah Warriorz; 175/7 (20 overs)
Rehan Ahmed 46 (27); Tim Southee 3/30 (4 overs)		Tom Kohler-Cadmore 83* (56); Mark Adair 2/23 (4 overs)

Sharjah Warriorz won by 3 wickets
Dubai International Cricket Stadium, Dubai
Umpires: Ahmad Shah Pakteen (Afg) and Alex Wharf (Eng)
Player of the match: Tom Kohler-Cadmore (Sharjah Warriorz)

- Sharjah Warriorz won the toss and elected to field.
- Saghir Khan (Gulf Giants) made his T20 debut.

Match 4
13 January 2025
18:00 (N)
Scorecard

MI Emirates; 187/7 (20 overs)	v	Dubai Capitals; 161/6 (20 overs)
Tom Banton 74 (52); Gulbadin Naib 3/18 (3 overs)		Shai Hope 101 (59); Fazalhaq Farooqi 2/22 (4 overs)

MI Emirates won by 26 runs
Sheikh Zayed Cricket Stadium, Abu Dhabi
Umpires: Martin Saggers (Eng) and Bismillah Jan Shinwari (Afg)
Player of the match: Tom Banton (MI Emirates)

- Dubai Capitals won the toss and elected to field.
- Nicholas Pooran (MI Emirates) scored his 50th half-century in T20s.
- Muhammad Waseem (MI Emirates) scored 3,000th run in T20s.

Match 5
14 January 2025
18:00 (N)
Scorecard

Gulf Giants; 119/9 (20 overs)	v	Desert Vipers; 121/4 (17.4 overs)
James Vince 76* (62); Lockie Ferguson 3/22 (4 overs)		Sam Curran 42* (43); Mark Adair 2/12 (4 overs)

Desert Vipers won by 6 wickets
Dubai International Cricket Stadium, Dubai
Umpires: Ahmad Shah Pakteen (Afg) and Ruchira Palliyaguruge (SL)
Player of the match: Sam Curran (Desert Vipers)

- Desert Vipers won the toss and elected to field.

Match 6
15 January 2025
18:30 (N)
Scorecard

Abu Dhabi Knight Riders; 159/5 (20 overs)	v	Sharjah Warriorz; 129 (19.3 overs)
Laurie Evans 39* (31); Adil Rashid 2/14 (4 overs)		Tim Southee 24 (11); Jason Holder 4/23 (4 overs)

Abu Dhabi Knight Riders won by 30 runs
Sheikh Zayed Cricket Stadium, Abu Dhabi
Umpires: Adrian Holdstock (SA) and Martin Saggers (Eng)
Player of the match: David Willey (Abu Dhabi Knight Riders)

- Sharjah Warriorz won the toss and elected to field.

Match 7
16 January 2025
18:30 (N)
Scorecard

MI Emirates; 159/6 (20 overs)	v	Desert Vipers; 161/5 (19.1 overs)
Kieron Pollard 36 (23); Lockie Ferguson 2/25 (4 overs)		Fakhar Zaman 67 (52); Zahoor Khan 2/24 (3 overs)

Desert Vipers won by 5 wickets
Dubai International Cricket Stadium, Dubai
Umpires: Shiju Sam (UAE) and Alex Wharf (Eng)
Player of the match: Fakhar Zaman (Desert Vipers)

- MI Emirates won the toss and elected to bat.

Match 8
17 January 2025
18:30 (N)
Scorecard

Dubai Capitals; 201/5 (20 overs)	v	Sharjah Warriorz; 202/5 (18.1 overs)
Shai Hope 83* (52); Tim Southee 2/35 (4 overs)		Avishka Fernando 81 (27); Dushmantha Chameera 3/30 (4 overs)

Sharjah Warriorz won by 5 wickets
Sheikh Zayed Cricket Stadium, Abu Dhabi
Umpires: Aasif Iqbal (UAE) and Adrian Holdstock (SA)
Player of the match: Avishka Fernando (Sharjah Warriorz)

- Sharjah Warriorz won the toss and elected to field.
- Avishka Fernando (Sharjah Warriorz) scored the fastest half-century in International League T20. He reached his fifty in just 16 balls.

Match 9
18 January 2025
14:00
Scorecard

Desert Vipers; 193/4 (20 overs)	v	Abu Dhabi Knight Riders; 140 (17.4 overs)
Alex Hales 58 (36); Jason Holder 2/24 (4 overs)		Joe Clarke 55 (32); Nathan Sowter 3/44 (4 overs)

Desert Vipers won by 53 runs
Dubai International Cricket Stadium, Dubai
Umpires: Ruchira Palliyaguruge (SL) and Alex Wharf (Eng)
Player of the match: Luke Wood (Desert Vipers)

- Desert Vipers won the toss and elected to bat.

Match 10
18 January 2025
18:00 (N)
Scorecard

Dubai Capitals; 165/7 (20 overs)	v	Gulf Giants; 168/4 (18.1 overs)
Dasun Shanaka 33* (20); Aayan Afzal Khan 2/12 (3 overs)		Gerhard Erasmus 50* (34); Farhan Khan 1/14 (1 over)

Gulf Giants won by 6 wickets
Sheikh Zayed Cricket Stadium, Abu Dhabi
Umpires: Adrian Holdstock (SA) and Akbar Ali (UAE)
Player of the match: Gerhard Erasmus (Gulf Giants)

- Gulf Giants won the toss and elected to field.
- Uzair Khan (Gulf Giants) made his T20 debut.

Match 11
19 January 2025
14:00
Scorecard

Sharjah Warriorz; 176/9 (20 overs)	v	MI Emirates; 177/1 (17.4 overs)
Johnson Charles 59 (42); Fazalhaq Farooqi 4/24 (4 overs)		Tom Banton 102* (55); Dilshan Madushanka 1/36 (3.4 overs)

MI Emirates won by 9 wickets
Sheikh Zayed Cricket Stadium, Abu Dhabi
Umpires: Alex Wharf (Eng) and Ruchira Palliyaguruge (SL)
Player of the match: Tom Banton (MI Emirates)

- MI Emirates won the toss and elected to field.
- Ethan D'Souza (Sharjah Warriorz) made his T20 debut.

Match 12
19 January 2025
18:00 (N)
Scorecard

Abu Dhabi Knight Riders; 176/9 (20 overs)	v	Gulf Giants; 139/8 (20 overs)
Michael Pepper 57 (35); Aayan Afzal Khan 4/16 (4 overs)		Ibrahim Zadran 24 (22); Ai Khan 2/23 (3 overs)

Abu Dhabi Knight Riders won by 37 runs
Dubai International Cricket Stadium, Dubai
Umpires: Adrian Holdstock (SA) and Martin Saggers (Eng)
Player of the match: Michael Pepper (Abu Dhabi Knight Riders)

- Gulf Giants won the toss and elected to field.
- Ibrar Ahmad (Abu Dhabi Knight Riders) made his T20 debut.

Match 13
20 January 2025
18:30 (N)
Scorecard

Desert Vipers; 139 (19.5 overs)	v	Dubai Capitals; 140/4 (17.4 overs)
Alex Hales 34 (31); Dushmantha Chameera 3/26 (2.5 overs)		Gulbadin Naib 78* (51); Lockie Ferguson 2/29 (4 overs)

Dubai Capitals won by 6 wickets
Dubai International Cricket Stadium, Dubai
Umpires: Akbar Ali (UAE) and Adrian Holdstock (SA)
Player of the match: Gulbadin Naib (Dubai Capitals)

- Dubai Capitals won the toss and elected to field.
- Dan Lawrence (Desert Vipers) scored his 3,000th run in T20s.
- Gulbadin Naib (Dubai Capitals) scored his 2,000th run in T20s.

Match 14
21 January 2025
18:30 (N)
Scorecard

MI Emirates; 186/6 (20 overs)	v	Abu Dhabi Knight Riders; 158/9 (20 overs)
Nicholas Pooran 49 (26); Jason Holder 2/38 (4 overs)		Andre Russell 37* (23); Romario Shepherd 2/14 (2 overs)

MI Emirates won by 28 runs
Sheikh Zayed Cricket Stadium, Abu Dhabi
Umpires: Shiju Sam (UAE) and Alex Wharf (Eng)
Player of the match: Romario Shepherd (MI Emirates)

- Abu Dhabi Knight Riders won the toss and elected to field.
- Andries Gous (Abu Dhabi Knight Riders) scored 2,000th run in T20s.

Match 15
22 January 2025
18:30 (N)
Scorecard

Sharjah Warriorz; 91 (19.1 overs)	v	Desert Vipers; 95/0 (10 overs)
Jason Roy 30* (34); Mohammad Amir 4/24 (3.1 overs)		Fakhar Zaman 71* (39)

Desert Vipers won by 10 wickets
Dubai International Cricket Stadium, Dubai
Umpires: Aasif Iqbal (UAE) and Martin Saggers (Eng)
Player of the match: Mohammad Amir (Desert Vipers)

- Desert Vipers won the toss and elected to field.
- Wanindu Hasaranga (Desert Vipers) took his 300th wicket in T20s.
- Sam Curran (Desert Vipers) took his 250th wicket in T20s.

Match 16
23 January 2025
18:30 (N)
Scorecard

Gulf Giants; 153/5 (20 overs)	v	Dubai Capitals; 154/5 (18.4 overs)
Jordan Cox 70 (53); Gulbadin Naib 1/8 (1 over)		Shai Hope 47 (39); Aayan Afzal Khan 2/23 (4 overs)

Dubai Capitals won by 5 wickets
Dubai International Cricket Stadium, Dubai
Umpires: Martin Saggers (Eng) and Alex Wharf (Eng)
Player of the match: Shai Hope (Dubai Capitals)

- Dubai Capitals won the toss and elected to field.
- Aayan Afzal Khan (Gulf Giants) took his 50th wicket in T20s.

Match 17
24 January 2025
18:30 (N)
Scorecard

Abu Dhabi Knight Riders; 182/7 (20 overs)	v	MI Emirates; 140/6 (20 overs)
Alishan Sharafu 55 (38); Alzarri Joseph 3/32 (4 overs)		Kieron Pollard 69* (49); Kyle Mayers 3/25 (3 overs)

Abu Dhabi Knight Riders won by 42 runs
Sheikh Zayed Cricket Stadium, Abu Dhabi
Umpires: Ruchira Palliyaguruge (SL) and Shiju Sam (UAE)
Player of the match: Alishan Sharafu (Abu Dhabi Knight Riders)

- MI Emirates won the toss and elected to field.

Match 18
25 January 2025
14:00
Scorecard

Sharjah Warriorz; 151/8 (20 overs)	v	Desert Vipers; 152/2 (14.5 overs)
Jason Roy 55 (38); Khuzaima Tanveer 4/22 (4 overs)		Alex Hales 77* (42); Adam Milne 2/17 (3 overs)

Desert Vipers won by 8 wickets
Sheikh Zayed Cricket Stadium, Abu Dhabi
Umpires: Akbar Ali (UAE) and Adrian Holdstock (SA)
Player of the match: Khuzaima Tanveer (Desert Vipers)

- Desert Vipers won the toss and elected to field.
- Khuzaima Tanveer (Desert Vipers) made his T20 debut.

Match 19
25 January 2025
18:00 (N)
Scorecard

MI Emirates; 151/6 (20 overs)	v	Gulf Giants; 152/8 (20 overs)
Tom Banton 56 (39); Daniel Worrall 2/19 (4 overs)		Gerhard Erasmus 37 (28); Fazalhaq Farooqi 3/34 (4 overs)

Gulf Giants won by 2 wickets
Sheikh Zayed Cricket Stadium, Abu Dhabi
Umpires: Ruchira Palliyaguruge (SL) and Alex Wharf (Eng)
Player of the match: Mark Adair (Gulf Giants)

- Gulf Giants won the toss and elected to field.
- Tom Banton (MI Emirates) scored his 4,000th run in T20s.
- Tom Curran (Gulf Giants) scored his 2,000th run in T20s.

Match 20
26 January 2025
14:00
Scorecard

Abu Dhabi Knight Riders; 203/4 (20 overs)	v	Dubai Capitals; 207/2 (19.5 overs)
Charith Asalanka 74 (38); Sikandar Raza 2/24 (4 overs)		Gulbadin Naib 80 (47); Andre Russell 1/38 (3 overs)

Dubai Capitals won by 8 wickets
Sheikh Zayed Cricket Stadium, Abu Dhabi
Umpires: Ruchira Palliyaguruge (SL) and Shiju Sam (UAE)
Player of the match: Gulbadin Naib (Dubai Capitals)

- Dubai Capitals won the toss and elected to field.

Match 21
26 January 2025
18:00 (N)
Scorecard

Sharjah Warriorz; 171/6 (20 overs)	v	Gulf Giants; 172/4 (19.3 overs)
Jason Roy 44 (30); Blessing Muzarabani 3/32 (4 overs)		Tom Alsop 85* (60); Dilshan Madushanka 2/49 (4 overs)

Gulf Giants won by 6 wickets
Sheikh Zayed Cricket Stadium, Abu Dhabi
Umpires: Aasif Iqbal (UAE) and Martin Saggers (Eng)
Player of the match: Tom Alsop (Gulf Giants)

- Gulf Giants won the toss and elected to field.

Match 22
27 January 2025
18:30 (N)
Scorecard

MI Emirates; 228/2 (20 overs)	v	Desert Vipers; 74 (12.3 overs)
Tom Banton 105 (55); Mohammad Amir 1/36 (4 overs)		Azam Khan 12 (11); Alzarri Joseph 3/17 (3 overs)

MI Emirates won by 154 runs
Sheikh Zayed Cricket Stadium, Abu Dhabi
Umpires: Shiju Sam (UAE) and Alex Wharf (Eng)
Player of the match: Tom Banton (MI Emirates)

- Desert Vipers won the toss and elected to field.
- Fazalhaq Farooqi (MI Emirates) took his 150th wicket in T20s.

Match 23
28 January 2025
18:30 (N)
Scorecard

Dubai Capitals; 131/9 (20 overs)	v	Sharjah Warriorz; 135/1 (11.5 overs)
Shai Hope 45 (52); Rohan Mustafa 2/12 (3 overs)		Johnson Charles 71 (33); Sikandar Raza 1/9 (2 overs)

Sharjah Warriorz won by 9 wickets
Dubai International Cricket Stadium, Dubai
Umpires: Akbar Ali (UAE) and Martin Saggers (Eng)
Player of the match: Adam Zampa (Sharjah Warriorz)

- Sharjah Warriorz won the toss and elected to field.

Match 24
29 January 2025
18:30 (N)
Scorecard

Gulf Giants; 129/8 (20 overs)	v	Desert Vipers; 130/5 (19 overs)
Tom Curran 64* (34); Wanindu Hasaranga 3/10 (4 overs)		Max Holden 70* (54); Blessing Muzarabani 3/25 (4 overs)

Desert Vipers won by 5 wickets
Dubai International Cricket Stadium, Dubai
Umpires: Ruchira Palliyaguruge (SL) and Alex Wharf (Eng)
Player of the match: Wanindu Hasaranga (Desert Vipers)

- Desert Vipers won the toss and elected to field.

Match 25
30 January 2025
18:30 (N)
Scorecard

Abu Dhabi Knight Riders; 161/8 (20 overs)	v	Sharjah Warriorz; 162/6 (19 overs)
Kyle Mayers 56 (35); Adam Zampa 3/27 (4 overs)		Johnson Charles 65 (35); Sunil Narine 2/20 (4 overs)

Sharjah Warriorz won by 4 wickets
Sheikh Zayed Cricket Stadium, Abu Dhabi
Umpires: Akbar Ali (UAE) and Ruchira Palliyaguruge (SL)
Player of the match: Adam Zampa (Sharjah Warriorz)

- Sharjah Warriorz won the toss and elected to field.

Match 26
31 January 2025
18:30 (N)
Scorecard

Gulf Giants; 173/6 (20 overs)	v	MI Emirates; 174/5 (19.1 overs)
James Vince 86 (50); Muhammad Rohid 2/36 (4 overs)		Nicholas Pooran 58* (37); Aayan Afzal Khan 2/9 (2 overs)

MI Emirates won by 5 wickets
Dubai International Cricket Stadium, Dubai
Umpires: Martin Saggers (Eng) and Ruchira Palliyaguruge (SL)
Player of the match: Nicholas Pooran (MI Emirates)

- MI Emirates won the toss and elected to field.

Match 27
1 February 2025
18:30 (N)
Scorecard

Abu Dhabi Knight Riders; 123/7 (20 overs)	v	Gulf Giants; 124/3 (17.5 overs)
David Willey 41 (29); Chris Jordan 2/20 (4 overs)		Gerhard Erasmus 47 (51); David Willey 2/17 (4 overs)

Gulf Giants won by 7 wickets
Sheikh Zayed Cricket Stadium, Abu Dhabi
Player of the match: Daniel Worrall (Gulf Giants)

- Gulf Giants won the toss and elected to field.
- Andre Russell (Abu Dhabi Knight Riders) scored his 9,000th run in T20s.

Match 28
2 February 2025
14:00
Scorecard

MI Emirates; 173/5 (20 overs)	v	Sharjah Warriorz; 176/2 (17.2 overs)
Tom Banton 84* (51); Tim Southee 1/22 (4 overs)		Tom Kohler-Cadmore 91* (52); Fazalhaq Farooqi 1/22 (3 overs)

Sharjah Warriorz won by 8 wickets
Sheikh Zayed Cricket Stadium, Abu Dhabi
Umpires: Alex Wharf (Eng) and Ruchira Palliyaguruge (SL)
Player of the match: Tom Kohler-Cadmore (Sharjah Warriorz)

- Sharjah Warriorz won the toss and elected to field.

Match 29
2 February 2025
18:00 (N)
Scorecard

Dubai Capitals; 217/4 (20 overs)	v	Abu Dhabi Knight Riders; 191/5 (20 overs)
David Warner 93* (57); Ibrar Ahmad 1/24 (2 overs)		Andries Gous 78 (47); Dushmantha Chameera 2/25 (4 overs)

Dubai Capitals won by 26 runs
Dubai International Cricket Stadium, Dubai
Umpires: Martin Saggers (Eng) and Rod Tucker (Aus)
Player of the match: David Warner (Dubai Capitals)

- Abu Dhabi Knight Riders won the toss and elected to field.

Match 30
3 February 2025
18:00 (N)
Scorecard

Desert Vipers; 137 (19.4 overs)	v	Dubai Capitals; 138/1 (17.1 overs)
Dan Lawrence 44 (31); Qais Ahmad 4/25 (4 overs)		Gulbadin Naib 55* (31); David Payne 1/29 (4 overs)

Dubai Capitals won by 9 wickets
Sheikh Zayed Cricket Stadium, Abu Dhabi
Umpires: Aasif Iqbal (UAE) and Ruchira Palliyaguruge (SL)
Player of the match: Qais Ahmad (Dubai Capitals)

- Dubai Capitals won the toss and elected to field.

== Playoffs ==
Qualifier 1
5 February 2025 - Dubai
1	Desert Vipers	189/7 (20 overs)
2	Dubai Capitals	193/5 (20 overs)
Eliminator
6 February 2025 - Abu Dhabi
3	MI Emirates	146/8 (20 overs)
4	Sharjah Warriorz	149/4 (18.5 overs)

Qualifier 2
7 February 2025 - Sharjah
Q1L	Desert Vipers	165/3 (16.4 overs)
EW	Sharjah Warriorz	162/7 (20 overs)

Final
9 February 2025 - Dubai
Q1W	Dubai Capitals	191/6 (19.2 overs)
Q2W	Desert Vipers	189/5 (20 overs)

=== Qualifier 1 ===
Qualifier 1
5 February 2025
18:30 (N)
Scorecard

Desert Vipers; 189/7 (20 overs)	v	Dubai Capitals; 193/5 (20 overs)
Alex Hales 67 (32); Gulbadin Naib 2/25 (3 overs)		Gulbadin Naib 62 (39); Lockie Ferguson 2/32 (3.5 overs)

Dubai Capitals won by 5 wickets
Dubai International Cricket Stadium, Dubai
Umpires: Ruchira Palliyaguruge (SL) and Rod Tucker (Aus)
Player of the match: Gulbadin Naib (Dubai Capitals)

- Dubai Capitals won the toss and elected to field.

=== Eliminator ===
Eliminator
6 February 2025
18:30 (N)
Scorecard

MI Emirates; 146/8 (20 overs)	v	Sharjah Warriorz; 149/4 (18.5 overs)
Nicholas Pooran 42 (22); Tim Southee 2/24 (4 overs)		Tim Seifert 40* (20); Muhammad Rohid 3/32 (4 overs)

Sharjah Warriorz won by 6 wickets
Sheikh Zayed Cricket Stadium, Abu Dhabi
Umpires: Shiju Sam (UAE) and Alex Wharf (Eng)
Player of the match: Tim Seifert (Sharjah Warriorz)

- Sharjah Warriorz won the toss and elected to field.

=== Qualifier 2 ===
Qualifier 2
7 February 2025
18:30 (N)
Scorecard

Sharjah Warriorz; 162/7 (20 overs)	v	Desert Vipers; 165/3 (16.4 overs)
Jason Roy 73 (56); Khuzaima Tanveer 2/20 (3 overs)		Max Holden 48 (34); Adam Milne 2/26 (3.4 overs)

Desert Vipers won by 7 wickets
Sharjah Cricket Stadium, Sharjah
Umpires: Martin Saggers (Eng) and Rod Tucker (Aus)
Player of the match: Alex Hales (Desert Vipers)

- Desert Vipers won the toss and elected to field.

=== Final ===
Final
9 February 2025
18:30 (N)
Scorecard

Desert Vipers; 189/5 (20 overs)	v	Dubai Capitals; 191/6 (19.2 overs)
Max Holden 76 (51); Obed McCoy 2/44 (4 overs)		Rovman Powell 63 (38); David Payne 2/28 (4 overs)

Dubai Capitals won by 4 wickets
Dubai International Cricket Stadium, Dubai
Umpires: Rod Tucker (Aus) and Alex Wharf (Eng)
Player of the match: Rovman Powell (Dubai Capitals)

- Dubai Capitals won the toss and elected to field.

== Statistics ==
Most runs
Runs	Player	Team
527	Shai Hope	Dubai Capitals
493	Tom Banton	MI Emirates
405	Alex Hales	Desert Vipers
388	Tom Kohler-Cadmore	Sharjah Warriorz
387	Sam Curran	Desert Vipers

Source: ESPNcricinfo

Most wickets
Wickets	Player	Team
21	Fazalhaq Farooqi	MI Emirates
17	Jason Holder	Abu Dhabi Knight Riders
16	Blessing Muzarabani	Gulf Giants
16	Alzarri Joseph	MI Emirates
14	Mohammad Amir	Desert Vipers
14	Adam Milne	Sharjah Warriorz

- Source: ESPNcricinfo

End of season awards
Award	Winner	Team
Most Valuable Player	Sam Curran	Desert Vipers
Best UAE player	Muhammad Waseem	MI Emirates

== Broadcasting ==
The league was broadcast live on the following channels:

Country	TV	Radio	Internet
Afghanistan	Ariana TV		
India	Zee Network		FanCode, Zee5
Nepal			Styx Sports
Pakistan			TAPMAD
Sri Lanka	Supreme TV		Dialog ViU App
Caribbean	Rush Sports		
Middle East and North Africa	Abu Dhabi Sports TV; Dubai Sports TV	Talk FM Radio 100.3	YouTube
Rest of the world			YouTube
