= 2025–26 International League T20 =

Fourth season of ILT20

- Dates: 2 December 2025 – 4 January 2026
- Administrator: Emirates Cricket Board
- Cricket format: Twenty20
- Tournament format(s): Double round-robin and Playoffs
- Champions: Desert Vipers (1st title)
- Runners-up: MI Emirates
- Participants: 6
- Matches: 34
- Player of the series: Sam Curran (Desert Vipers)
- Most runs: Sam Curran (397) (Desert Vipers)
- Most wickets: Waqar Salamkheil (18) (Dubai Capitals); Ajay Kumar (18) (Abu Dhabi Knight Riders)
- Official website: www.ilt20.ae

The 2025–26 International League T20, also known as DP World ILT20 2025–26 for sponsorship reasons, was the fourth season of the International League T20, a professional Twenty20 cricket league in the United Arab Emirates, organised by the Emirates Cricket Board. This edition of the tournament started on 2 December 2025 and the final was played on 4 January 2026. Dubai Capitals were the defending champions.

In the final, Desert Vipers defeated MI Emirates by 46 runs to win their maiden title.

== Background ==
The fourth season of the International League T20 (ILT20) began on 2 December 2025, UAE National Day – which was one of the most important days on the UAE calendar, earlier than usual to avoid clash with the 2026 Men's T20 World Cup in February. The tournament was concluded on 4 January 2026. The revised schedule also helped to reduce overlap with other T20 leagues like SA20, Big Bash League, and BPL.

=== Player auction ===
The teams had a purse of US$2 million, out of which US$1.2 million could be used for retention and direct signings. USD 800,000 and any leftover amount from retention and direct signings can be used in auction, with a minimum of US$1.5 million needed to be spend.

Each franchise is allowed to build a squad of 19 to 21 players, excluding wildcard picks. Squad composition rules require a minimum of 11 players from ICC Full Member nations, four from the UAE, one each from Kuwait and Saudi Arabia, and two from other Associate Member countries. Teams are also permitted to sign up to two wildcard players after the auction, with a separate budget of US$250,000 for such additions.

The player auction was held in Jumeirah, Dubai on 1 October 2025. Zee Entertainment (Zee5) has been awarded as the Global Broadcast Partner for the 2025-26 ILT20 - International League T20.

== Squads ==
Retained players were announced on 7 July 2025.

The squads of all teams are as below:

Abu Dhabi Knight Riders	Desert Vipers	Dubai Capitals	Gulf Giants	MI Emirates	Sharjah Warriorz
Captain
(Cricket West Indies) Jason Holder	(New Zealand) Lockie Ferguson (Note: Ferguson was ruled out of the season due to injury; Sam Curran took over as captain of the Desert Vipers.)	(Sri Lanka) Dasun Shanaka	(England) James Vince	(Cricket West Indies) Kieron Pollard	(New Zealand) Tim Southee
Players
(Saudi Arabia) Abdul Manan Ali; (Kuwait) Adnan Idrees; (United Arab Emirates) Ajay Kumar; (England) Alex Hales; (United Arab Emirates) Alishan Sharafu; (Cricket West Indies) Andre Russell; (Scotland) Brandon McMullen; (England) George Garton; (United Arab Emirates) Ibrar Ahmad; (Cricket West Indies) Khary Pierre; (England) Liam Livingstone; (India) Mayank Choudhary (wk); (England) Michael Pepper (wk); (England) Olly Stone; (England) Phil Salt (wk); (India) Piyush Chawla; (United States) Shadley van Schalkwyk; (Cricket West Indies) Sherfane Rutherford; (Cricket West Indies) Sunil Narine; (United States) Unmukt Chand (wk)	(United States) Andries Gous (wk); (Kuwait) Bilal Tahir; (England) Dan Lawrence; (England) David Payne; (Saudi Arabia) Faisal Khan; (Pakistan) Fakhar Zaman; (Afghanistan) Faridoon Dawoodzai; (Pakistan) Hassan Nawaz; (United Arab Emirates) Khuzaima Tanveer; (United Arab Emirates) Matiullah Khan; (England) Max Holden; (Pakistan) Naseem Shah; (Afghanistan) Noor Ahmad; (Afghanistan) Qais Ahmad; (England) Sam Curran; (India) Sanjay Pahal; (Cricket West Indies) ~~Shimron Hetmyer~~ (Note: Shimron Hetmyer got ruled out of a part of the season due to hamstring injury, and he was replaced by Jason Roy.); (England) Tawanda Muyeye; (Scotland) Tom Bruce; (United Arab Emirates) Vriitya Aravind (wk)	(Kuwait) Anudeep Chenthamara; (India) ~~Akshay Wakhare~~; (England) David Willey; (United Arab Emirates) Farhan Khan; (Afghanistan) Gulbadin Naib; (United Arab Emirates) Haider Ali; (New Zealand) James Neesham; (England) Jordan Cox (wk); (England) Leus du Plooy; (Afghanistan) Mohammad Nabi; (United Arab Emirates) Muhammad Farooq; (United Arab Emirates) Muhammad Jawadullah; (Bangladesh) Mustafizur Rahman; (Cricket West Indies) Navin Bidaisee; (United Arab Emirates) ~~Ritesh Grandhi~~ (Note: Ritesh Grandhi got ruled out of the season, and he was replaced by Mustafizur Rahman.); (Cricket West Indies) Rovman Powell; (United States) Rushil Ugarkar; (Scotland) Scott Currie; (Afghanistan) Sediqullah Atal; (United States) Shayan Jahangir (wk); (England) Toby Albert; (England) ~~Tymal Mills~~ (Note: Tymal Mills got ruled out and he was replaced by Dushmantha Chameera.); (Saudi Arabia) Usman Najeeb; (Afghanistan) Waqar Salamkheil	(United Arab Emirates) Aayan Afzal Khan; (United Arab Emirates) Asif Khan; (Afghanistan) Azmatullah Omarzai; (Zimbabwe) ~~Blessing Muzarabani~~ (Note: Blessing Muzarabani got ruled out of the season due to injury, and he was replaced by Nuwan Thushara.); (England) Chris Wood; (Netherlands) Fred Klaassen; (Namibia) Gerhard Erasmus; (United Arab Emirates) Haider Razzaq; (Saudi Arabia) Ishtiaq Ahmad; (Cricket West Indies) Kyle Mayers; (England) Liam Dawson; (Ireland) Lorcan Tucker (wk); (Cricket West Indies) Matthew Forde; (Ireland) Mark Adair; (Kuwait) Meet Bhavsar; (England) Moeen Ali; (United Arab Emirates) Muhammad Zuhaib; (Afghanistan) Rahmanullah Gurbaz (wk); (Cricket West Indies) ~~Ramon Simmonds~~ (Note: Ramon Simmonds got ruled out of the season due to injury, and he was replaced by Pathum Nissanka.); (South Africa) Sean Dickson; (South Africa) Tabraiz Shamsi; (England) Tom Moores (wk); (Pakistan) Maaz Sadaqat	(Cricket West Indies) Ackeem Auguste; (Afghanistan) AM Ghazanfar; (Cricket West Indies) Andre Fletcher; (Afghanistan) Arab Gul Momand; (England) Chris Woakes; (Afghanistan) Fazalhaq Farooqi; (England) Jonny Bairstow (wk); (England) ~~Jordan Thompson~~ (Note: Jordan Thompson got ruled out of the season due to injury, and he was replaced by Rashid Khan.); (Sri Lanka) Kamindu Mendis; (Kuwait) Mohamed Shafeeq; (United Arab Emirates) Muhammad Rohid Khan; (United Arab Emirates) Muhammad Waseem; (Afghanistan) Naveen-ul-Haq; (Cricket West Indies) Nicholas Pooran (wk); (United States) Nosthush Kenjige; (Cricket West Indies) Romario Shepherd; (Bangladesh) Shakib Al Hasan; (United States) Tajinder Singh; (England) Tom Banton (wk); (United Arab Emirates) Zahoor Khan; (Saudi Arabia) Zain Ul Abidin; (Afghanistan) Usman Khan Shinwari	(Saudi Arabia) Abdul Salman Khan; (England) Adil Rashid; (India) Dinesh Karthik (wk); (South Africa) Dwaine Pretorius; (United Arab Emirates) Ethan D'Souza; (United States) Harmeet Singh; (England) James Rew (wk); (Cricket West Indies) Jayden Seales; (Cricket West Indies) Johnson Charles (wk); (United Arab Emirates) Junaid Siddique; (Sri Lanka) Kusal Mendis (wk); (Sri Lanka) Maheesh Theekshana; (Sri Lanka) Matheesha Pathirana; (Kuwait) Mohammed Aslam; (England) Nathan Sowter; (United Arab Emirates) Raees Ahmed Ayan; (Zimbabwe) Richard Ngarava; (United States) Saurabh Netravalkar; (United States) Shubham Ranjane; (Zimbabwe) Sikandar Raza; (Bangladesh) Taskin Ahmed; (Australia) Tim David; (England) Tom Abell; (England) Tom Kohler-Cadmore (wk); (United Arab Emirates) Wasim Akram; (Pakistan) Faheem Ashraf
Replacement players
	(England) Jason Roy	(Sri Lanka) Dushmantha Chameera; (Canada) Kaleem Sana (Note: Mustafizur Rahman got ruled out of a part of the season, and he was replaced by Kaleem Sana.); (Bangladesh) Mustafizur Rahman	(United States) Ali Khan (Note: Nuwan Thushara got ruled out of a part of the season due to national duty, and he was replaced by Ali Khan.); (England) Jordan Clark (Note: Pathum Nissanka got ruled out of a part of the season due to national duty, and he was replaced by Jordan Clark.); (Sri Lanka) Nuwan Thushara; (Sri Lanka) Pathum Nissanka	(Afghanistan) Rashid Khan	

== Venues ==

United Arab Emirates
Dubai	Sharjah	Abu Dhabi
Dubai International Cricket Stadium	Sharjah Cricket Stadium	Sheikh Zayed Cricket Stadium
Capacity: 25,000	Capacity: 16,000	Capacity: 20,000

== Teams and standings ==
=== Points table ===
Pos	Team	Pld	W	L	NR	Pts	NRR	Qualification
1	Desert Vipers (C)	10	8	2	0	16	0.438	Advance to Qualifier 1
2	MI Emirates (R)	10	7	3	0	14	0.676	Advance to Qualifier 1
3	Dubai Capitals (4th)	10	5	5	0	10	0.578	Advance to Eliminator
4	Abu Dhabi Knight Riders (3rd)	10	4	6	0	8	−0.559	Advance to Eliminator
5	Gulf Giants	10	3	7	0	6	−0.310	Eliminated
6	Sharjah Warriorz	10	3	7	0	6	−0.815	Eliminated

Source: ESPNcricinfo
(C) Champions; (R) Runners-up

=== Match summary ===
Team	Group matches										Playoffs		
Team	1	2	3	4	5	6	7	8	9	10	Q1/E	Q2	F
Abu Dhabi Knight Riders	2	2	2	2	2	4	6	6	6	8	W	L	
Desert Vipers	2	4	6	8	10	12	12	14	14	16	W		W
Dubai Capitals	0	0	2	4	4	4	6	8	10	10	L		
Gulf Giants	2	4	4	6	6	6	6	6	6	6			
MI Emirates	0	2	2	4	4	6	8	10	12	14	L	W	L
Sharjah Warriorz	0	0	0	2	4	4	4	6	6	6			

Win	Loss	No result

- Note: The total points at the end of each group match are listed.
- Note: Click on the points (group matches) or W/L (playoffs) to see the match summary.

Visitor team →	ADKR	DV	DC	GG	MIE	SW
Home team ↓	ADKR	DV	DC	GG	MIE	SW
Abu Dhabi Knight Riders		Abu Dhabi; 1 run	Dubai; 9 runs	Abu Dhabi; 4 wickets	Emirates; 7 wickets	Sharjah; 4 wickets
Desert Vipers	Vipers; 2 wickets		Vipers; 5 wickets	Vipers; Super Over	Emirates; 4 wickets	Vipers; 4 wickets
Dubai Capitals	Dubai; 83 runs	Vipers; 4 wickets		Giants; 4 wickets	Emirates; 7 runs	Dubai; 6 wickets
Gulf Giants	Abu Dhabi; 32 runs	Vipers; 8 wickets	Dubai; 6 wickets		Giants; 6 wickets	Giants; 6 wickets
MI Emirates	Emirates; 35 runs	Vipers; 1 run	Emirates; 8 wickets	Emirates; 8 wickets		Sharjah; 6 runs
Sharjah Warriorz	Abu Dhabi; 39 runs	Vipers; 5 wickets	Dubai; 63 runs	Sharjah; 11 runs	Emirates; 4 runs	

Home team won	Visitor team won

- Note: Results listed are according to the home (horizontal) and visitor (vertical) teams.
- Note: Click on a result to see a summary of the match.

== League stage ==
Match 1
2 December 2025
18:30 (N)
Scorecard

Dubai Capitals; 150/8 (20 overs)	v	Desert Vipers; 151/6 (19 overs)
Rovman Powell 39 (22); Noor Ahmad 2/25 (4 overs)		Andries Gous 58 (36); Waqar Salamkheil 2/18 (4 overs)

Desert Vipers won by 4 wickets
Dubai International Cricket Stadium, Dubai
Umpires: Gazi Sohel (Ban) and Simon Taufel (Aus)
Player of the match: Andries Gous (Desert Vipers)

- Desert Vipers won the toss and elected to field.

Match 2
3 December 2025
18:30 (N)
Scorecard

Abu Dhabi Knight Riders; 233/4 (20 overs)	v	Sharjah Warriorz; 194/9 (20 overs)
Liam Livingstone 82* (38); Adil Rashid 2/31 (4 overs)		Tim David 60 (24); George Garton 2/24 (2 overs)

Abu Dhabi Knight Riders won by 39 runs
Sharjah Cricket Stadium, Sharjah
Umpires: Ahmad Shah Pakteen (Afg) and Martin Saggers (Eng)
Player of the match: Liam Livingstone (Abu Dhabi Knight Riders)

- Sharjah Warriorz won the toss and elected to field.
- Raees Ahmed (Sharjah Warriorz) and Ajay Kumar (Abu Dhabi Knight Riders) both made their T20 debuts.

Match 3
4 December 2025
18:30 (N)
Scorecard

MI Emirates; 163/6 (20 overs)	v	Gulf Giants; 164/4 (14.4 overs)
Kieron Pollard 50 (33); Azmatullah Omarzai 2/32 (4 overs)		Pathum Nissanka 81 (42); Chris Woakes 2/49 (4 overs)

Gulf Giants won by 6 wickets
Dubai International Cricket Stadium, Dubai
Umpires: Assif Razzaq (UAE) and Wayne Knights (NZ)
Player of the match: Pathum Nissanka (Gulf Giants)

- Gulf Giants won the toss and elected to field.
- Haider Razzaq (Gulf Giants) made his T20 debut.

Match 4
5 December 2025
18:30 (N)
Scorecard

Abu Dhabi Knight Riders; 171/6 (20 overs)	v	Desert Vipers; 175/8 (19.3 overs)
Alex Hales 53 (37); Qais Ahmad 2/29 (4 overs)		Shimron Hetmyer 48 (25); Ajay Kumar 3/21 (4 overs)

Desert Vipers won by 2 wickets
Sharjah Cricket Stadium, Sharjah
Umpires: Asif Iqbal (UAE) and Wayne Knights (NZ)
Player of the match: Shimron Hetmyer (Desert Vipers)

- Desert Vipers won the toss and elected to field.

Match 5
6 December 2025
18:30 (N)
Scorecard

Dubai Capitals; 160/6 (20 overs)	v	Gulf Giants; 161/6 (18.5 overs)
Sediqullah Atal 35 (25); Azmatullah Omarzai 3/46 (4 overs)		Pathum Nissanka 67 (31); Dasun Shanaka 2/16 (2 overs)

Gulf Giants won by 4 wickets
Dubai International Cricket Stadium, Dubai
Umpires: Akbar Ali (UAE) and Martin Saggers (Eng)
Player of the match: Pathum Nissanka (Gulf Giants)

- Gulf Giants won the toss and elected to field.

Match 6
7 December 2025
14:00
Scorecard

MI Emirates; 185/8 (20 overs)	v	Sharjah Warriorz; 181/7 (20 overs)
Muhammad Waseem 39 (29); Adil Rashid 3/32 (4 overs)		Sikandar Raza 64 (33); Allah Mohammad Ghazanfar 2/21 (4 overs)

MI Emirates won by 4 runs
Sharjah Cricket Stadium, Sharjah
Umpires: Ahmad Shah Pakteen (Afg) and Gazi Sohel (Ban)
Player of the match: Romario Shepherd (MI Emirates)

- Sharjah Warriorz won the toss and elected to field.
- Wasim Akram (Sharjah Warriorz) made his T20 debut.
- Sikandar Raza (Sharjah Warriorz) hit his 300th six in T20s.

Match 7
7 December 2025
18:30 (N)
Scorecard

Dubai Capitals; 186/4 (20 overs)	v	Abu Dhabi Knight Riders; 103 (15.3 overs)
Rovman Powell 96* (52); Jason Holder 2/30 (4 overs)		Phil Salt 27 (21); Waqar Salamkheil 4/29 (3.3 overs)

Dubai Capitals won by 83 runs
Dubai International Cricket Stadium, Dubai
Umpires: Aasif Iqbal (UAE) and Wayne Knights (NZ)
Player of the match: Rovman Powell (Dubai Capitals)

- Abu Dhabi Knight Riders won the toss and elected to field.

Match 8
8 December 2025
18:30 (N)
Scorecard

Gulf Giants; 179/5 (20 overs)	v	Desert Vipers; 179/9 (20 overs)
Pathum Nissanka 56 (29); Khuzaima Tanveer 2/23 (4 overs)		Dan Lawrence 56 (31); Azmatullah Omarzai 2/32 (4 overs)

Match tied (Desert Vipers won the Super Over)
Dubai International Cricket Stadium, Dubai
Umpires: Gazi Sohel (Ban) and Rod Tucker (Aus)
Player of the match: Dan Lawrence (Desert Vipers)

- Desert Vipers won the toss and elected to field.
- Super Over: Desert Vipers 13/1, Gulf Giants 9/0.

Match 9
9 December 2025
18:30 (N)
Scorecard

Desert Vipers; 159/4 (20 overs)	v	MI Emirates; 158/9 (20 overs)
Max Holden 42 (37); Allah Mohammad Ghazanfar 2/32 (4 overs)		Tom Banton 34 (29); David Payne 4/29 (4 overs)

Desert Vipers won by 1 run
Sheikh Zayed Cricket Stadium, Abu Dhabi
Umpires: Akbar Ali (UAE) and Martin Saggers (Eng)
Player of the match: David Payne (Desert Vipers)

- MI Emirates won the toss and elected to field.

Match 10
10 December 2025
18:30 (N)
Scorecard

Sharjah Warriorz; 157/6 (20 overs)	v	Gulf Giants; 158/4 (19.4 overs)
Dwaine Pretorius 36 (17); Aayan Afzal Khan 3/17 (4 overs)		Rahmanullah Gurbaz 50 (36); Sikandar Raza 2/20 (4 overs)

Gulf Giants won by 6 wickets
Dubai International Cricket Stadium, Dubai
Umpires: Shiju Sam (UAE) and Rod Tucker (Aus)
Player of the match: Aayan Afzal Khan (Gulf Giants)

- Gulf Giants won the toss and elected to field.

Match 11
11 December 2025
18:30 (N)
Scorecard

Abu Dhabi Knight Riders; 122 (19.3 overs)	v	MI Emirates; 123/3 (13.5 overs)
Alishan Sharafu 38 (34); Fazalhaq Farooqi 4/14 (3.3 overs)		Jonny Bairstow 49* (38); Jason Holder 1/11 (2 overs)

MI Emirates won by 7 wickets
Sheikh Zayed Cricket Stadium, Abu Dhabi
Umpires: Aasif Iqbal (UAE) and Wayne Knights (NZ)
Player of the match: Kamindu Mendis (MI Emirates)

- MI Emirates won the toss and elected to field.

Match 12
12 December 2025
18:30 (N)
Scorecard

Gulf Giants; 157/7 (20 overs)	v	Desert Vipers; 158/2 (16.5 overs)
Liam Dawson 38* (14); Khuzaima Tanveer 4/10 (4 overs)		Sam Curran 67* (43); Chris Wood 1/27 (4 overs)

Desert Vipers won by 8 wickets
Dubai International Cricket Stadium, Dubai
Umpires: Shiju Sam (UAE) and Gazi Sohel (Ban)
Player of the match: Khuzaima Tanveer (Desert Vipers)

- Desert Vipers won the toss and elected to field.

Match 13
13 December 2025
18:30 (N)
Scorecard

Dubai Capitals; 196/5 (20 overs)	v	Abu Dhabi Knight Riders; 187/8 (20 overs)
Shayan Jahangir 99 (54); Jason Holder 2/22 (4 overs)		Andre Russell 53* (33); Waqar Salamkheil 3/34 (4 overs)

Dubai Capitals won by 9 runs
Sheikh Zayed Cricket Stadium, Abu Dhabi
Umpires: Akbar Ali (UAE) and Martin Saggers (Eng)
Player of the match: Shayan Jahangir (Dubai Capitals)

- Abu Dhabi Knight Riders won the toss and elected to field.

Match 14
14 December 2025
14:00
Scorecard

Sharjah Warriorz; 174/3 (20 overs)	v	MI Emirates; 168/5 (20 overs)
Johnson Charles 77 (53); Rashid Khan 1/22 (4 overs)		Nicholas Pooran 48* (35); Sikandar Raza 2/15 (4 overs)

Sharjah Warriorz won by 6 runs
Sheikh Zayed Cricket Stadium, Abu Dhabi
Umpires: Wayne Knights (NZ) and Martin Saggers (Eng)
Player of the match: Sikandar Raza (Sharjah Warriorz)

- MI Emirates won the toss and elected to field.
- Matheesha Pathirana (Sharjah Warriorz) played his 100th T20 match.

Match 15
14 December 2025
18:30 (N)
Scorecard

Dubai Capitals; 166/4 (20 overs)	v	Desert Vipers; 171/5 (19.4 overs)
Leus du Plooy 54 (44); Sam Curran 2/17 (3 overs)		Sam Curran 52* (33); Dasun Shanaka 2/19 (1.4 overs)

Desert Vipers won by 5 wickets
Dubai International Cricket Stadium, Dubai
Umpires: Shiju Sam (UAE) and Rod Tucker (Aus)
Player of the match: Sam Curran (Desert Vipers)

- Desert Vipers won the toss and elected to field.
- Desert Vipers qualified for the playoffs as a result of this match.

Match 16
15 December 2025
18:30 (N)
Scorecard

Sharjah Warriorz; 174/6 (20 overs)	v	Gulf Giants; 163/9 (20 overs)
Tom Abell 68 (41); Chris Wood 2/26 (4 overs)		Moeen Ali 45 (41); Matheesha Pathirana 3/19 (4 overs)

Sharjah Warriorz won by 11 runs
Sharjah Cricket Stadium, Sharjah
Umpires: Gazi Sohel (Ban) and Rod Tucker (Aus)
Player of the match: Matheesha Pathirana (Sharjah Warriorz)

- Gulf Giants won the toss and elected to field.

Match 17
16 December 2025
18:30 (N)
Scorecard

Abu Dhabi Knight Riders; 181/5 (20 overs)	v	Desert Vipers; 180/6 (20 overs)
Liam Livingstone 76 (48); Lockie Ferguson 3/34 (4 overs)		Max Holden 52 (43); Andre Russell 2/16 (3 overs)

Abu Dhabi Knight Riders won by 1 run
Sheikh Zayed Cricket Stadium, Abu Dhabi
Umpires: Wayne Knights (NZ) and Martin Saggers (Eng)
Player of the match: Liam Livingstone (Abu Dhabi Knight Riders)

- Desert Vipers won the toss and elected to field.

Match 18
17 December 2025
18:30 (N)
Scorecard

MI Emirates; 137/8 (20 overs)	v	Dubai Capitals; 130 (20 overs)
Jonny Bairstow 67 (40); Mustafizur Rahman 3/34 (4 overs)		Jordan Cox 46 (41); Rashid Khan 2/14 (4 overs)

MI Emirates won by 7 runs
Dubai International Cricket Stadium, Dubai
Umpires: Gazi Sohel (Ban) and Rod Tucker (Aus)
Player of the match: Rashid Khan (MI Emirates)

- Dubai Capitals won the toss and elected to field.

Match 19
18 December 2025
18:30 (N)
Scorecard

Gulf Giants; 165/7 (20 overs)	v	Abu Dhabi Knight Riders; 167/6 (19.2 overs)
Rahmanullah Gurbaz 72 (45); Piyush Chawla 4/27 (4 overs)		Alex Hales 46 (39); Tabraiz Shamsi 3/23 (4 overs)

Abu Dhabi Knight Riders won by 4 wickets
Sheikh Zayed Cricket Stadium, Abu Dhabi
Umpires: Aasif Iqbal (UAE) and Wayne Knights (NZ)
Player of the match: Piyush Chawla (Abu Dhabi Knight Riders)

- Abu Dhabi Knight Riders won the toss and elected to field.

Match 20
19 December 2025
18:30 (N)
Scorecard

Dubai Capitals; 180/6 (20 overs)	v	Sharjah Warriorz; 117 (17 overs)
Sediqullah Atal 66 (44); Taskin Ahmed 3/40 (4 overs)		James Rew 47 (38); Waqar Salamkheil 3/22 (4 overs)

Dubai Capitals won by 63 runs
Sharjah Cricket Stadium, Sharjah
Umpires: Wayne Knights (NZ) and Rod Tucker (Aus)
Player of the match: Mohammad Nabi (Dubai Capitals)

- Sharjah Warriorz won the toss and elected to field.

Match 21
20 December 2025
14:00
Scorecard

Abu Dhabi Knight Riders; 187/4 (20 overs)	v	MI Emirates; 152 (20 overs)
Nicholas Pooran 40* (24); Ajay Kumar 2/42 (4 overs)		Brandon McMullen 64 (49); Zahoor Khan 3/16 (4 overs)

MI Emirates won by 35 runs
Sheikh Zayed Cricket Stadium, Abu Dhabi
Umpires: Akbar Ali (UAE) and Martin Saggers (Eng)
Player of the match: Zahoor Khan (MI Emirates)

- Abu Dhabi Knight Riders won the toss and elected to field.

Match 22
20 December 2025
18:30 (N)
Scorecard

Sharjah Warriorz; 90 (17.5 overs)	v	Desert Vipers; 91/6 (13.5 overs)
Tom Abell 35* (36); David Payne 4/14 (4 overs)		Sam Curran 37 (30); Taskin Ahmed 2/20 (4 overs)

Desert Vipers won by 4 wickets
Dubai International Cricket Stadium, Dubai
Umpires: Shiju Sam (UAE) and Rod Tucker (Aus)
Player of the match: David Payne (Desert Vipers)

- Sharjah Warriorz won the toss and elected to bat.

Match 23
21 December 2025
14:00
Scorecard

Gulf Giants; 156 (19.5 overs)	v	Dubai Capitals; 162/4 (19.2 overs)
Azmatullah Omarzai 43 (26); Mustafizur Rahman 3/34 (3.5 overs)		Shayan Jahangir 48 (44); Azmatullah Omarzai 2/27 (4 overs)

Dubai Capitals won by 6 wickets
Sharjah Cricket Stadium, Sharjah
Umpires: Shiju Sam (UAE) and Gazi Sohel (Ban)
Player of the match: Mustafizur Rahman (Ban)

- Dubai Capitals won the toss and elected to field.

Match 24
21 December 2025
18:30 (N)
Scorecard

Desert Vipers; 124/7 (20 overs)	v	MI Emirates; 128/6 (17.3 overs)
Dan Lawrence 35* (34); Shakib Al Hasan 2/14 (4 overs)		Kieron Pollard 26 (15); Matiullah Khan 2/18 (2.3 overs)

MI Emirates won by 4 wickets
Dubai International Cricket Stadium, Dubai
Umpires: Wayne Knights (NZ) and Martin Saggers (Eng)
Player of the match: Shakib Al Hasan (MI Emirates)

- MI Emirates won the toss and elected to field.

Match 25
22 December 2025
18:30 (N)
Scorecard

Abu Dhabi Knight Riders; 134/9 (20 overs)	v	Sharjah Warriorz; 135/6 (20 overs)
Sherfane Rutherford 44 (36); Adil Rashid 3/18 (4 overs)		James Rew 42* (29); Jason Holder 2/25 (4 overs)

Sharjah Warriorz won by 4 wickets
Sheikh Zayed Cricket Stadium, Abu Dhabi
Umpires: Akbar Ali (UAE) and Martin Saggers (Eng)
Player of the match: Adil Rashid (Sharjah Warriorz)

- Abu Dhabi Knight Riders won the toss and elected to bat.

Match 26
23 December 2025
18:30 (N)
Scorecard

Gulf Giants; 141/6 (20 overs)	v	MI Emirates; 142/2 (16.3 overs)
Moeen Ali 51 (48); Fazalhaq Farooqi 2/17 (4 overs)		Nicholas Pooran 69* (49); Azmatullah Omarzai 1/20 (3 overs)

MI Emirates won by 8 wickets
Sheikh Zayed Cricket Stadium, Abu Dhabi
Umpires: Shiju Sam (UAE) and Rod Tucker (Aus)
Player of the match: Muhammad Waseem (MI Emirates)

- MI Emirates won the toss and elected to field.
- MI Emirates qualified for the playoffs as a result of this match.

Match 27
24 December 2025
18:30 (N)
Scorecard

Sharjah Warriorz; 134/8 (20 overs)	v	Dubai Capitals; 138/4 (19.1 overs)
Johnson Charles 43 (46); Haider Ali 2/13 (4 overs)		Jordan Cox 61* (50); Sikandar Raza 2/15 (4 overs)

Dubai Capitals won by 6 wickets
Dubai International Cricket Stadium, Dubai
Umpires: Aasif Iqbal (UAE) and Wayne Knights (NZ)
Player of the match: Jordan Cox (Dubai Capitals)

- Dubai Capitals won the toss and elected to field.
- Dubai Capitals qualified for the playoffs as a result of this match.

Match 28
26 December 2025
18:30 (N)
Scorecard

Sharjah Warriorz; 140/7 (20 overs)	v	Desert Vipers; 144/5 (19.3 overs)
Johnson Charles 43 (37); Naseem Shah 3/35 (4 overs)		Max Holden 65* (46); Harmeet Singh 3/29 (4 overs)

Desert Vipers won by 5 wickets
Sharjah Cricket Stadium, Sharjah
Umpires: Gazi Sohel (Ban) and Rod Tucker (Aus)
Player of the match: Max Holden (Desert Vipers)

- Desert Vipers won the toss and elected to field.

Match 29
27 December 2025
18:30 (N)
Scorecard

Dubai Capitals; 122/8 (20 overs)	v	MI Emirates; 126/2 (16.4 overs)
Mohammad Nabi 22 (30); AM Ghazanfar 3/28 (4 overs)		Kieron Pollard 44 (31); Haider Ali 1/14 (4 overs)

MI Emirates won by 8 wickets
Sheikh Zayed Cricket Stadium, Abu Dhabi
Umpires: Wayne Knights (NZ) and Martin Saggers (Eng)
Player of the match: AM Ghazanfar (MI Emirates)

- MI Emirates won the toss and elected to field.

Match 30
28 December 2025
18:30 (N)
Scorecard

Abu Dhabi Knight Riders; 179/1 (20 overs)	v	Gulf Giants; 147/9 (20 overs)
Michael Pepper 83 (51); Aayan Afzal Khan 1/34 (4 overs)		Moeen Ali 79 (49); Andre Russell 3/13 (2 overs)

Abu Dhabi Knight Riders won by 32 runs
Dubai International Cricket Stadium, Dubai
Umpires: Martin Saggers (Eng) and Rod Tucker (Aus)
Player of the match: Michael Pepper (Abu Dhabi Knight Riders)

- Gulf Giants won the toss and elected to field.
- Abu Dhabi Knight Riders qualified for the playoffs as a result of this match.

== Playoffs ==
=== Bracket ===
Qualifier 1
30 December 2025 — Abu Dhabi
1	Desert Vipers	233/1 (20 overs)
2	MI Emirates	188/7 (20 overs)
Eliminator
1 January 2026 — Dubai
3	Dubai Capitals	108 (16.2 overs)
4	Abu Dhabi Knight Riders	158/7 (20 overs)

Qualifier 2
2 January 2026 — Sharjah
Q1L	MI Emirates	122/3 (16.1 overs)
EW	Abu Dhabi Knight Riders	120/8 (20 overs)

Final
4 January 2026 — Dubai
Q1W	Desert Vipers	182/4 (20 overs)
Q2W	MI Emirates	136 (18.3 overs)

=== Qualifier 1 ===
Qualifier 1
30 December 2025
18:30 (N)
Scorecard

Desert Vipers; 233/1 (20 overs)	v	MI Emirates; 188/7 (20 overs)
Andries Gous 120* (58); AM Ghazanfar 1/37 (4 overs)		Tom Banton 63 (27); Usman Tariq 3/33 (4 overs)

Desert Vipers won by 45 runs
Sheikh Zayed Cricket Stadium, Abu Dhabi
Umpires: Akbar Ali (UAE) and Wayne Knights (NZ)
Player of the match: Andries Gous (Desert Vipers)

- MI Emirates won the toss and elected to field.

=== Eliminator ===
Eliminator
1 January 2026
18:30 (N)
Scorecard

Abu Dhabi Knight Riders; 158/7 (20 overs)	v	Dubai Capitals; 108 (16.2 overs)
Michael Pepper 72 (49); Mohammad Nabi 3/25 (4 overs)		Mohammad Nabi 27 (21); Sunil Narine 3/12 (3 overs)

Abu Dhabi Knight Riders won by 50 runs
Dubai International Cricket Stadium, Dubai
Umpires: Aasif Iqbal (UAE) and Rod Tucker (Aus)
Player of the match: Sunil Narine (Abu Dhabi Knight Riders)

- Abu Dhabi Knight Riders won the toss and elected to bat.

=== Qualifier 2 ===
Qualifier 2
2 January 2026
18:30 (N)
Scorecard

Abu Dhabi Knight Riders; 120/8 (20 overs)	v	MI Emirates; 122/3 (16.1 overs)
Alishan Sharafu 50* (40); AM Ghazanfar 3/24 (4 overs)		Tom Banton 64* (53); Ajay Kumar 2/13 (3 overs)

MI Emirates won by 7 wickets
Sharjah Cricket Stadium, Sharjah
Umpires: Martin Saggers (Eng) and Shiju Sam (UAE)
Player of the match: Shakib Al Hasan (MI Emirates)

- MI Emirates won the toss and elected to field.

=== Final ===
Final
4 January 2026
18:30 (N)
Scorecard

Desert Vipers; 182/4 (20 overs)	v	MI Emirates; 136 (18.3 overs)
Sam Curran 74* (51); Fazalhaq Farooqi 2/33 (4 overs)		Shakib Al Hasan 36 (27); Naseem Shah 3/18 (4 overs)

Desert Vipers won by 46 runs
Dubai International Cricket Stadium, Dubai
Umpires: Martin Saggers (Eng) and Rod Tucker (Aus)
Player of the match: Sam Curran (Desert Vipers)

- MI Emirates won the toss and elected to field.

== Statistics ==
Most runs
Runs	Player	Team
397	Sam Curran	Desert Vipers
370	Muhammad Waseem	MI Emirates
359	Max Holden	Desert Vipers
327	Tom Banton	MI Emirates
321	Jordan Cox	Dubai Capitals
Source: ESPNcricinfo

Most wickets
Wickets	Player	Team
18	Waqar Salamkheil	Dubai Capitals
18	Ajay Kumar	Abu Dhabi Knight Riders
17	Khuzaima Tanveer	Desert Vipers
17	David Payne	Desert Vipers
15	Jason Holder	Abu Dhabi Knight Riders
Source: ESPNcricinfo

End of season awards
Award	Winner	Team
Most Valuable Player	Sam Curran	Desert Vipers
Best UAE player	Muhammad Waseem	MI Emirates
