= List of 2026 International League T20 auctions and personnel signings =

2026 International League T20 Player Auction

General information
- Sport: Cricket
- Date: 1 October 2026
- Time: 14:00 GST (UTC+04:00)
- Location: Four Seasons Hotel, Jumeirah, Dubai, United Arab Emirates
- Networks: ZEE5 (India); YouTube (Rest of the World)

Overview
- League: 2026 International League T20
- Teams: 6

This is a list of auction and personnel signings for the 2026 International League T20 cricket tournament, held in the United Arab Emirates, and organised by the Emirates Cricket Board.

== Background ==
The ILT20 Season 5 Player Auction will be held in Dubai on October 1 at the ICC Academy indoor facility. More than 800 players from 23 countries have registered for the auction, with the organisers now in the process of shortlisting them to around 200.

== Retained players ==
Abu Dhabi Knight Riders	Desert Vipers	Dubai Capitals	Gulf Giants	MI Emirates	Sharjah Warriors
Sunil Narine; Jason Holder	Andries Gous; Dan Lawrence; Shimron Hetmyer	Rovman Powell; Mustafizur Rahman	Azmatullah Omarzai; Blessing Muzarabani	Nicholas Pooran; Rashid Khan; Romario Shepherd	Sikandar Raza

== Pre-signed players ==
Abu Dhabi Knight Riders	Desert Vipers	Dubai Capitals	Gulf Giants	MI Emirates	Sharjah Warriors
Finn Allen; Matthew Tromp	Mujeeb Ur Rahman	Marcus Stoinis; Noor Ahmad	David Miller; Heinrich Klaasen	Sherfane Rutherford	James Vince; Adam Milne; Waqar Salamkheil

== Auction results ==
Name	National team	Playing role	Price (in US$)	Team	Notes
Muhammad Rohid	United Arab Emirates	Fast bowler	95,000	Abu Dhabi Knight Riders	
Khuzaima Bin Tanveer	United Arab Emirates	Fast bowler	75,000	Desert Vipers	RTM from Abu Dhabi Knight Riders

== Wildcard picks ==
Abu Dhabi Knight Riders	Desert Vipers	Dubai Capitals	Gulf Giants	MI Emirates	Sharjah Warriors
Andre Russell	Tom Curran	Sam Billings	Akeal Hosein	Kieron Pollard	Tim Seifert

- Source: Cricinfo

== Auction signings ==
Abu Dhabi Knight Riders	Desert Vipers	Dubai Capitals	Gulf Giants	MI Emirates	Sharjah Warriors
Muhammad Rohid; Alishan Sharafu; Moeen Ali; Andre Fletcher; Arab Gul; Jakeem Pollard; Gulbadin Naib; Amshi de Silva; Colin Munro; Qais Ahmad; Lorcan Tucker; Usman Tariq; Michael Pepper; Abdullah Tarakhail; Ravija Sandaruwan	Khuzaima Bin Tanveer; Vriitya Aravind; Nilansh Keswani; Babar Azam; Naseem Shah; Fakhar Zaman; David Payne; Aneurin Donald; Nangeyalia Kharote; Harry Tector; Saleem Safi; Joe Clarke; Abdullah Ahmadzai; Shadab Khan; Bilal Tahir; Sanjay Pahal; Wali Muhammad; Ishtiaq Ahmed	Zuhaib Zubair; Aayan Khan; Haider Ali; Faf du Plessis; Dasun Shanaka; Phil Salt; Max Holden; Darwish Rasooli; Sediqullah Atal; Karim Janat; Mark Adair; Hassan Khan; Matthew Potts; Tom Moores; Luke Wood; Masood ul Rahman Gurbaz; Anudeep Chenthamara; Usman Najeeb	Ibrahim Zadran; Liam Livingstone; Rahmanullah Gurbaz; Matiullah Khan; Dhruv Parashar; Curtis Campher; David Wiese; Alzarri Joseph; Shamar Joseph; Imran Mir; Shubham Ranjane; Meet Bhavsar; Haider Rarraq; Alick Athanaze; Sagar Kalyan; Tabraiz Shamsi; Awais Ahmad; Wahidullah Zadran	Muhammad Waseem; Fazalhaq Farooqi; Kusal Perera; Zahoor Khan; Allah Ghazanfar; Wasim Akram; Asa Tribe; James Coles; Jonny Bairstow; Chris Jordan; Lizaad Williams; Jordon Thompson; Ross Adair; Faridoon Dawoodzai; Sanjay Krishnamurthi; Raizal Nadir Nather Shah; Zain ul Abidin; Mohammad Shafeeq	Tanish Suri; Junaid Siddique; Ali Aamer Naseer; Adil Rashid; Mohammad Nabi; Richard Gleeson; George Linde; Paul Walter; George Dockrell; Brandon McMullen; Fareed Malik; Tom Banton; Craig Overton; James Rew; Sarafuddin Ashraf; Logan van Beek; Arunraj Selvaraj; Mohammad Saqib

== Live Auction ==
=== Accelerated round ===
- Chris Jordan - MI Emirates (USD 170,000)
- Dushmantha Chameera - unsold
- Chris Woakes - unsold
- Craig Overton - Sharjah Warriorz (USD 80,000)
- James Coles - MI Emirates (USD 100,000)
- Michael Pepper - Abu Dhabi Knight Riders (USD 40,000)
- Tom Moores - Dubai Capitals (USD 40,000)
- James Rew - Sharjah Warriorz (USD 10,000)
- Lorcan Tucker - Abu Dhabi Knight Riders (USD 10,000)
- Usman Tariq - Abu Dhabi Knight Riders (USD 80,000)
- Dwayne Pretorius - unsold
- Alick Athanaze - Gulf Giants (USD 10,000)
- Jaydon Seales - unsold
- Lizaad Williams - MI Emirates (USD 110,000)
- Luke Wood - Dubai Capitals (USD 40,000)
- Ollie Stone - unsold
- Jordon Thompson - MI Emirates (USD 40,000)
- Ross Adair - MI Emirates (USD 10,000)
- Tabraiz Shamsi - Gulf Giants (USD 40,000)
- Tymal Mills - unsold
- Henry Crocombe - unsold
- Zahir Khan Pakteen - unsold
- Faridoon Dawoodzai - MI Emirates (USD 10,000)
- Qais Ahmad - Abu Dhabi Knight Riders (USD 38,000)
- Jai Moondra - unsold
- Fareed Malik - Sharjah Warriorz (USD 40,000)
- Abdullah Tarakhail - Abu Dhabi Knight Riders (USD 10,000)
- Tom Banton - Sharjah Warriorz (USD 80,000)
- Bas de Leede - unsold
- Shayan Jahangir - unsold
- Ali Khan - unsold
- Saurabh Netravalkar - unsold
- Sanjay Krishnamurthi - MI Emirates (USD 10,000)
- Logan van Beek - Sharjah Warriorz (USD 40,000)
- Luqmen Faisal - unsold
- Masood ul Rahman Gurbaz - Dubai Capitals (USD 10,000)
- Sagar Kalyan - Gulf Giants (USD 10,000)
- KS Bharat - unsold
- Adithya Shetty - unsold
- Ansh Tandon - unsold
- Raizal Nadir Nather Shah - MI Emirates (USD 10,000)
- Usaid Amin - unsold
- Wali Muhammad - Desert Vipers (USD 10,000)
- Awais Ahmad - Gulf Giants (USD 10,000)
- Muhammad Jawadullah - unsold
- Ravija Sandaruwan - Abu Dhabi Knight Riders (USD 10,000)
- Sarafuddin Ashraf - Sharjah Warriorz (USD 40,000)
- Wahidullah Zadran - Gulf Giants (USD 10,000)
- Jonny Bairstow - MI Emirates (USD 80,000)

=== Set 24: Saudi Arabian bowlers ===
- Ishtiaq Ahmed - Desert Vipers (USD 12,000)
- Imtiaz Khan - Gulf Giants (USD 10,000)
- Mohammad Saqib - Sharjah Warriorz (USD 10,000)
- Mohammed Ahmed Raza - unsold
- Md Shaikh Saif - unsold
- Faisal Tahir - unsold
- Imran Yousuf - unsold

=== Round 23 ===
- Usman Najeeb - Dubai Capitals, RTM (USD 10,000)
- Siddharth Sankar - unsold
- Zain ul Abidin - MI Emirates (USD 10,000)
- Syed Ali Abbas - unsold
- Faisal Khan - unsold
- Zahid Iqbal - unsold
- Saeed Naqqash - unsold
- Mohammed Hisham Shaikh - unsold
- Abdul Mannan Ali - Abu Dhabi Knight Riders (USD 10,000)
- Mohammed Atif - unsold

=== Round 22 ===
- Arunraj Selvaraj - Sharjah Warriorz (USD 10,000)
- Vishwa Teja Nettem - unsold
- Prasath Jeyaprakash - unsold
- Ansal Nazar - unsold
- Naveen Raj - unsold
- Manjula Prasana - unsold
- Mohammad Adnan - unsold
- Ummer Abbas - unsold
- Umar Abdullah - unsold
- Sandaruwan Chinthaka - unsold
- Nimish Latheef - unsold
- Anudeep Chenthamara - Dubai Capitals (USD 10,000)
- Mohammad Shafeeq - MI Emirates (USD 10,000)

=== Round 21 ===
- Santosh Kumar - unsold
- Shiraz Khan - unsold
- Ravija Sandaruwan - unsold
- Bilal Tahir - Desert Vipers, RTM (USD 10,000)
- Adnan Idrees - unsold
- Ali Zaheer Uddin - unsold
- Usman Ghani Patel - unsold
- Yasin Patel - unsold
- Clinto Anto - unsold
- Mohamed Aslam - unsold
- Jude Saldanha - unsold
- Meet Bhavsar - Gulf Giants, RTM (USD 10,000)

=== Round 20 ===
- Najibullah Zadran - unsold
- Rilee Russouw - unsold
- Tim Tector - unsold
- Shadab Khan - Desert Vipers (USD 80,000)
- Rahmat Shah - unsold
- Najmul Hossain Shanto - unsold
- Fabian Allen - unsold
- Mohammad Ishaq - unsold
- Noor ul Rahman Akakhail - unsold
- Hassan Nawaz - unsold
- Andrew Balbirnie - unsold
- Jason Roy - unsold

=== Round 19 ===
- Colin Ackermann - unsold
- Shubham Ranjane - Gulf Giants (USD 10,000)
- Yuvraaj Samra - unsold
- Dipendra Singh Airee - unsold
- Carmi le Roux - unsold
- Obus Pienaar - unsold
- Mark Watt - unsold
- Aryan Dutt - unsold

=== Round 18 ===
- Tom Bruce - unsold
- Rushil Ugarkar - unsold
- Ali Khan - unsold
- Saurabh Netravalkar - unsold
- Jon Jon Smuts - unsold
- Monank Patel - unsold
- Harmeet Singh Baddhan - unsold
- Shadley van Schalkwyk - unsold
- Tajinder Singh Dhillon - unsold

=== Round 17 ===
- Asa Tribe - MI Emirates (USD 10,000)
- George Munsey - unsold
- David Wiese - Gulf Giants (USD 70,000)
- Gerhard Erasmus - unsold
- Sanjay Krishnamurthi - unsold
- Hassan Khan - Dubai Capitals (USD 90,000)
- Shayan Jahangir - unsold
- Amshi de Silva - Abu Dhabi Knight Riders (USD 100,000)
- Brandon McMullen - Sharjah Warriorz (USD 80,000)
- Bas de Leede - unsold
- Tom Kohler-Cadmore - unsold

=== Round 16 ===
- Shahidullah Kamal - unsold
- Sharafuddin Ashraf - unsold
- Imran Tahir - unsold
- Alzarri Joseph - Gulf Giants (USD 230,000)
- Khalil Gurbaz - unsold
- Dan Worrall - unsold
- Hasan Mahmud - unsold
- Abdullah Ahmadzai - Desert Vipers (USD 40,000)
- Josh Little - unsold
- Shakib al Hasan - unsold
- Farmanullah Safi - unsold
- Nooristani Omarzai - unsold

=== Round 15 ===
- Jordan Clark - unsold
- Bilal Sami - unsold
- Yama Arab - unsold
- Ollie Stone - unsold
- Ziaur Rahman Sharifi - unsold
- Hasan Ali - unsold
- Saleem Safi - Desert Vipers (USD 10,000)
- Tymal Mills - unsold
- Sachindu Colombage - unsold
- George Dockrell - Sharjah Warriorz (USD 10,000)
- Wahidullah Zadran - unsold

=== Round 14 ===
- Imran Mir - Gulf Giants (USD 10,000)
- Tom Alsop - unsold
- Ollie Sykes - unsold
- Max Chu - unsold
- Ben Calitz - unsold
- Ross Adair - unsold
- Michael Pepper - unsold
- Tom Abell - unsold
- Joe Clarke - Desert Vipers (USD 40,000)
- Kamil Pooran - unsold
- Tom Moores - unsold
- Brandon King - unsold

=== Round 13 ===
- Gareth Delany - unsold
- Lewis Gregory - unsold
- Dwayne Pretorius - unsold
- Paul Stirling - unsold
- Caleb Falconer - unsold
- Dan Mousley - unsold
- Jordon Thompson - unsold
- Roston Chase - unsold
- Alick Athanaze - unsold

=== Round 12 ===
- Reece Topley - unsold
- Jai Moondra - unsold
- Shamar Joseph - Gulf Giants (USD 80,000)
- Gudakesh Motie - unsold
- Zaheer Khan Pakteen - unsold
- Lizaad Williams - unsold
- Henry Crocombe - unsold
- Izharulhaq Naveed - unsold
- Matthew Potts - Dubai Capitals (USD 10,000)
- Allah Ghazanfar - MI Emirates, RTM (USD 150,000)
- Jayden Seales - unsold

=== Round 11 ===
- Wafiullah Tarakhil - unsold
- Hassan Eisakhil - unsold
- Quentin Sampson - unsold
- Kyle Mayers - unsold
- Reeza Hendricks - unsold
- Colin Munro - Abu Dhabi Knight Riders (USD 40,000)
- Adam Hose - unsold
- Rassie van der Dussen - unsold
- Harry Tector - Desert Vipers (USD 12,000)

=== Round 10 ===
- Zeeshan Naseer - unsold
- Mohammad Ibrahim Masood - unsold
- Wasim Akram - MI Emirates (USD 10,000)
- Falaknoor Noor - unsold
- Muhammad Farooq - unsold
- Hilal Afghan - unsold
- Awais Ahmad - unsold
- Farhan Khan - unsold

=== Round 9 ===
- Sanjay Pahal - Desert Vipers (USD 22,000)
- Saeed Nazeer - unsold
- Muhammad Arfan - Dubai Capitals (USD 10,000)
- Uddish Suri - unsold
- Haider Rarraq - Gulf Giants (USD 10,000)
- Wali Muhammad - unsold
- Tahir Zaman - unsold
- Usaid Amin - unsold
- Nabeel Aziz - Sharjah Warriorz (USD 10,000)
- Muhammad Uzair Khan - unsold
- Asel Sigera - unsold

=== Round 8 ===
- Ethan D'souza - unsold
- Ronak Panoly - unsold
- Ansh Tandon - unsold
- Israr Ahmad - unsold
- Masood ul Rahman Gurbaz - unsold
- Harshit Kaushik - unsold
- Akshdeep Nath - unsold
- KS Bharat - unsold
- Junaid Shamshuddin - unsold
- Luqmen Faisal - unsold

=== Round 7 ===
- Gulbadin Naib - Abu Dhabi Knight Riders (USD 75,000)
- Curtis Campher - Gulf Giants (USD 22,000)
- Nangeyalia Kharote - Desert Vipers (USD 28,000)
- George Linde - Sharjah Warriorz (USD 40,000)
- Rehan Ahmed - unsold
- Karim Janat - Dubai Capitals (USD 40,000)
- Liam Dawson - unsold
- James Coles - unsold
- Paul Walter - Sharjah Warriorz (USD 110,000)
- Mark Adair - Dubai Capitals (USD 55,000)

=== Round 6 ===
- Richard Gleeson - Sharjah Warriorz (USD 180,000)
- Arab Gul - Abu Dhabi Knight Riders (USD 80,000)
- Faridoon Dawoodzai - unsold
- David Payne - Desert Vipers (USD 150,000)
- Nathan Sowter - unsold
- Jakeem Pollard - Abu Dhabi Knight Riders (USD 10,000)
- Usman Tariq - unsold
- Qais Ahmad - unsold
- Matthew Forde - unsold

=== Round 5 ===
- Andre Fletcher - Abu Dhabi Knight Riders (USD 40,000)
- Lorcan Tucker - unsold
- Max Holden - Dubai Capitals (USD 100,000)
- James Rew - unsold
- Will Smeed - unsold
- Aneurin Donald - Desert Vipers (USD 40,000)
- Darwish Rasooli - Dubai Capitals (USD 10,000)
- Sediqullah Atal - Dubai Capitals (USD 70,000)
- Kusal Perera - MI Emirates (USD 40,000)

=== Round 4 ===
- Tom Banton - unsold
- Naseem Shah - Desert Vipers (USD 80,000)
- Fakhar Zaman - Desert Vipers (USD 80,000)
- Luke Wood - unsold
- Adil Rashid - Sharjah Warriorz (USD 80,000)
- Fazalhaq Farooqi - MI Emirates (USD 380,000)
- Alex Hales - unsold
- Phil Salt - Dubai Capitals (USD 80,000)
- Mohammad Nabi - Sharjah Warriorz (USD 140,000)
- Craig Overton - unsold
- Moeen Ali - Abu Dhabi Knight Riders (USD 80,000)

=== Round 3 ===
- Ibrahim Zadran - Gulf Giants (USD 65,000)
- Faf du Plessis - Dubai Capitals (USD 300,000)
- Wanindu Hasaranga - unsold
- Chris Jordan - unsold
- Rahmanullah Gurbaz - Gulf Giants, RTM (USD 310,000)
- Liam Livingstone - Gulf Giants (USD 350,000)
- Dasun Shanaka - Dubai Capitals (USD 100,000)
- Babar Azam - Desert Vipers (USD 80,000)
- Chris Woakes - unsold
- Jonny Bairstow - unsold
- Pathum Nissanka - unsold

=== Round 2 ===
- Zahour Khan - MI Emirates (USD 30,000)
- Ibrar Ahmad - Abu Dhabi Knight Riders (USD 46,000)
- Ajay Kumar - Abu Dhabi Knight Riders (USD 40,000)
- Nilansh Keswani - Desert Vipers (USD 10,000)
- Basil Hameed - unsold
- Matiullah Khan - Gulf Giants (USD 10,000)
- Muhammad Jawadullah - unsold
- Junaid Siddique - Sharjah Warriorz (USD 10,000)
- Mohammad Sohaib Khan - unsold
- Dhruv Parashar - Gulf Giants (USD 10,000)
- Ali Aamer Naseer - Sharjah Warriorz (USD 40,000)

=== Round 1 ===
- Muhammad Rohid - Abu Dhabi Knight Riders (USD 95,000)
- Harpreet Singh Bhatia - unsold
- Khuzaima Bin Tanveer - Desert Vipers, RTM (USD 75,000)
- Muhammad Waseem - MI Emirates, RTM (USD 210,000)
- Sagar Kalyan - unsold
- Alishan Sharafu - Abu Dhabi Knight Riders, RTM (USD 110,000)
- Vriitya Aravind - Desert Vipers (USD 70,000)
- Tanish Suri - Sharjah Warriorz (USD 10,000)
- Zuhaib Zubair - Dubai Capitals (USD 26,000)
- Aayan Khan - Dubai Capitals (USD 95,000)
- Haider Ali - Dubai Capitals (USD 38,000)
