= 2023 International League T20 =

Inaugural season of the ILT20

- Dates: 13 January – 12 February
- Administrator: Emirates Cricket Board
- Cricket format: Twenty20
- Tournament format(s): Double round-robin and Playoffs
- Champions: Gulf Giants (1st title)
- Runners-up: Desert Vipers
- Participants: 6
- Matches: 34
- Attendance: 1,000 (29 per match)
- Player of the series: Chris Jordan (Gulf Giants)
- Most runs: Alex Hales (Desert Vipers) (469)
- Most wickets: Chris Jordan (Gulf Giants) (20)
- Official website: www.ilt20.ae

The 2023 International League T20, also known as the DP World ILT20 2023 for sponsorship reasons, was the inaugural season of the International League T20, a professional Twenty20 cricket league in the United Arab Emirates, organised by the Emirates Cricket Board (ECB). In June 2022, it was confirmed that the season would be played in January and February 2023 with six teams participating. The fixtures were announced on 29 November with the league set to run from January 13 to February 12.

Although matches were played using standard Twenty20 formats, players' statistics were not included in official records because Emirates Cricket Board is not a full-member of the International Cricket Council.

In the final, Gulf Giants defeated Desert Vipers by seven wickets to win the inaugural title.

== Squads ==
Abu Dhabi Knight Riders Coach: (India) Abhishek Nayar	Desert Vipers Coach: (United Kingdom) James Foster	Dubai Capitals Coach: (Trinidad and Tobago) Phil Simmons	Gulf Giants Coach: (Zimbabwe) Andy Flower	MI Emirates Coach: (New Zealand) Shane Bond	Sharjah Warriors Coach: (United Kingdom) Paul Farbrace
(Trinidad and Tobago) Sunil Narine (c); (Jamaica) Andre Russell; (United Kingdom) Jonny Bairstow; (Ireland) Paul Stirling; (Sri Lanka) Lahiru Kumara; (Sri Lanka) Charith Asalanka; (South Africa) Colin Ingram; (Trinidad and Tobago) Akeal Hosein; (Sri Lanka) Seekkuge Prasanna; (Trinidad and Tobago) Ravi Rampaul; (Barbados) Raymon Reifer; (Jamaica) Kennar Lewis; (United States) Ali Khan; (Netherlands) Brandon Glover; (Afghanistan) Matiullah Khan; (United Arab Emirates) Fahad Nawaz; (United Arab Emirates) Sabir Ali; (United Arab Emirates) Zawar Farid; (South Africa) Marchant de Lange; (Sri Lanka) Dhananjaya De Silva; (South Africa) Connor Esterhuizen; (United Arab Emirates) Traveen Mathew; (United Kingdom) Joe Clarke	(New Zealand) Colin Munro (c); (Sri Lanka) Wanindu Hasaranga; (United Kingdom) Sam Billings; (United Kingdom) Alex Hales; (United Kingdom) Tom Curran; (Nepal) Sandeep Lamichhane; (United Kingdom) Saqib Mahmood; (Guyana) Sherfane Rutherford; (United Kingdom) Ben Duckett; (United Kingdom) Benny Howell; (Jamaica) Sheldon Cottrell; (Bermuda) Ruben Trumpelmann; (Pakistan) Qasim Akram; (United Arab Emirates) Rohan Mustafa; (United Arab Emirates) Shiraz Ahmed; (United Arab Emirates) Ali Naseer; (United Arab Emirates) Ronak Panoly; (United Arab Emirates) Aryan Lakra; (United Kingdom) Tymal Mills; (Sri Lanka) Matheesha Pathirana; (Sri Lanka) Dinesh Chandimal; (United Kingdom) Adam Lyth; (United Kingdom) Mark Watt; (United Kingdom) Gus Atkinson; (United Kingdom) Jake Lintott; (Canada) Saad Bin Zafar*; (Afghanistan) Shiraz Khan*; (Nepal) Kushal Malla*; (Pakistan) Shaheen Afridi	(Jamaica) Rovman Powell (c); (Sri Lanka) Dushmantha Chameera; (Afghanistan) Hazratullah Zazai; (Jamaica) Fabian Allen; (Afghanistan) Mujeeb Ur Rahman; (Zimbabwe) Sikandar Raza; (Sri Lanka) Niroshan Dickwella; (Sri Lanka) Dasun Shanaka; (Sri Lanka) Bhanuka Rajapaksa; (United Kingdom) Dan Lawrence; (Zimbabwe) Blessing Muzarabani; (Sri Lanka) Isuru Udana; (United Kingdom) George Munsey; (Netherlands) Fred Klaassen; (Netherlands) Tim Pringle*; (United Kingdom) Ravi Bopara; (United Arab Emirates) Hazrat Luqman; (United Arab Emirates) Chirag Suri; (United Arab Emirates) Jash Giyanani; (United Arab Emirates) Akif Raja; (India) Robin Uthappa; (India) Yusuf Pathan; (United Kingdom) Joe Root; (Sri Lanka) Chamika Karunaratne; (United Kingdom) Oliver White; (United States) Jonathan Figy*; (United Arab Emirates) Adhitya Shetty*; (United Arab Emirates) Yasir Mohammad*; (Australia) Adam Zampa	(United Kingdom) James Vince (c); (Guyana) Shimron Hetmyer; (United Kingdom) Chris Jordan; (Australia) Chris Lynn; (United Kingdom) Tom Banton; (Dominica) Dominic Drakes; (Namibia) David Wiese; (United Kingdom) Liam Dawson; (United Kingdom) Jamie Overton; (Afghanistan) Qais Ahmad; (United Kingdom) Richard Gleeson; (United Kingdom) Ollie Pope; (United Kingdom) Rehan Ahmed; (Australia) Wayne Madsen; (United Arab Emirates) Aayan Afzal Khan; (United Arab Emirates) Sanchit Sharma; (United Arab Emirates) Chundangapoyil Rizwan; (United Arab Emirates) Ashwanth Valthapa; (United Arab Emirates) Ansh Tandon*; (United Arab Emirates) Meet Bhavsar*; (United Kingdom) Thomas Helm; (Namibia) Gerhard Erasmus; (Barbados) Carlos Brathwaite; (New Zealand) Finn Allen*; (Zimbabwe) Richard Ngarava*; (Sri Lanka) Kusal Mendis*; (Pakistan) Asif Khan*; (United Arab Emirates) Ritwik Behera*; (Ireland) Harry Tector*; (United Kingdom) Phil Salt*; (Afghanistan) Izharulhaq Naveed*; (United Arab Emirates) Bilal Hassan*; (Sri Lanka) Nipun Malinga*	(Trinidad and Tobago) Kieron Pollard (c); (Trinidad and Tobago) Dwayne Bravo; (Trinidad and Tobago) Nicholas Pooran; (New Zealand) Trent Boult; (Grenada) Andre Fletcher; (South Africa) Imran Tahir; (United Kingdom) Samit Patel; (United Kingdom) Will Smeed; (United Kingdom) Jordan Thompson; (Afghanistan) Najibullah Zadran; (Afghanistan) Zahir Khan; (Afghanistan) Fazalhaq Farooqi; (United Kingdom) Brad Wheal; (Netherlands) Bas de Leede; (United Arab Emirates) Muhammad Waseem; (United Arab Emirates) Basil Hameed; (United Arab Emirates) Vriitya Aravind; (United Arab Emirates) Zahoor Khan; (Ireland) Lorcan Tucker; (United Kingdom) Craig Overton; (United Kingdom) Tom Lammonby; (United Kingdom) Dan Mousley; (United Arab Emirates) Rahul Bhatia*; (United Arab Emirates) Vatsal Vaghela*; (United Arab Emirates) Fayyaz Butt*; (United Arab Emirates) Mohammed Rizlan*; (United Arab Emirates) Waseeq Ahmed*; (United Arab Emirates) David Mathias*; (Afghanistan) Rashid Khan	(United Kingdom) Moeen Ali (c); (United Kingdom) Dawid Malan; (Trinidad and Tobago) Evin Lewis; (Afghanistan) Mohammad Nabi; (United Kingdom) Chris Woakes; (Afghanistan) Noor Ahmad; (Afghanistan) Rahmanullah Gurbaz; (Afghanistan) Naveen-ul-Haq; (United Kingdom) Tom Kohler-Cadmore; (United Kingdom) Chris Benjamin; (United Kingdom) Danny Briggs; (Trinidad and Tobago) Mark Deyal; (Oman) Bilal Khan; (Namibia) JJ Smit; (United Arab Emirates) Karthik Meiyappan; (United Arab Emirates) Alishan Sharafu; (United Arab Emirates) Junaid Siddique; (United Arab Emirates) Muhammad Jawadullah; (United Kingdom) Joe Denly; (Australia) Marcus Stoinis; (New Zealand) Jacob Duffy; (United Kingdom) Paul Walter

- * indicates Supportive players

== Venues ==

United Arab Emirates
Dubai	Sharjah	Abu Dhabi
Dubai International Cricket Stadium	Sharjah Cricket Stadium	Sheikh Zayed Cricket Stadium
Capacity: 25,000	Capacity: 16,000	Capacity: 20,000

== Points table ==
Pos	Team	Pld	W	L	NR	Pts	NRR
1	Gulf Giants (C)	10	7	1	2	16	1.258
2	Desert Vipers (R)	10	7	3	0	14	0.399
3	MI Emirates	10	5	4	1	11	1.059
4	Dubai Capitals	10	4	5	1	9	−0.386
5	Sharjah Warriors	10	3	6	1	7	−0.522
6	Abu Dhabi Knight Riders	10	1	8	1	3	−1.784

Source: ESPNCricinfo
(C) Champions; (R) Runners-up
- The top 4 teams qualified for the playoffs.
- Advanced to Qualifier 1
- Advanced to Eliminator

== League stage ==
13 January 2023	Dubai Capitals; 187/6 (20 overs)	v	Abu Dhabi Knight Riders; 114/9 (20 overs)	Dubai Capitals won by 73 runs.
18:00 Match 1 Scorecard	Dubai Capitals; 187/6 (20 overs)	v	Abu Dhabi Knight Riders; 114/9 (20 overs)	Dubai International Cricket Stadium, Dubai; Umpires: Simon Taufel (Aus) and Rod Tucker (Aus); Player of the match: Rovman Powell (Dubai Capitals)
18:00 Match 1 Scorecard	Rovman Powell 48 (29); Ravi Rampaul 2/36 (4 overs)		Paul Stirling 54 (38); Rovman Powell 2/15 (2 overs)	Dubai International Cricket Stadium, Dubai; Umpires: Simon Taufel (Aus) and Rod Tucker (Aus); Player of the match: Rovman Powell (Dubai Capitals)
Abu Dhabi Knight Riders won the toss and elected to field.				Dubai International Cricket Stadium, Dubai; Umpires: Simon Taufel (Aus) and Rod Tucker (Aus); Player of the match: Rovman Powell (Dubai Capitals)

14 January 2023	MI Emirates; 204/5 (20 overs)	v	Sharjah Warriors; 155/9 (20 overs)	MI Emirates won by 49 runs.
18:00 Match 2 Scorecard	MI Emirates; 204/5 (20 overs)	v	Sharjah Warriors; 155/9 (20 overs)	Sheikh Zayed Cricket Stadium, Abu Dhabi; Umpires: Akbar Ali (UAE) and Richard Kettleborough (Eng); Player of the match: Muhammad Waseem (MI Emirates)
18:00 Match 2 Scorecard	Muhammad Waseem 71 (39); Chris Woakes 2/23 (4 overs)		Chris Woakes 62 (29); Imran Tahir 3/26 (4 overs)	Sheikh Zayed Cricket Stadium, Abu Dhabi; Umpires: Akbar Ali (UAE) and Richard Kettleborough (Eng); Player of the match: Muhammad Waseem (MI Emirates)
Sharjah Warriors won the toss and elected to field.				Sheikh Zayed Cricket Stadium, Abu Dhabi; Umpires: Akbar Ali (UAE) and Richard Kettleborough (Eng); Player of the match: Muhammad Waseem (MI Emirates)

15 January 2023	Abu Dhabi Knight Riders; 114/9 (20 overs)	v	Gulf Giants; 115/4 (14.2 overs)	Gulf Giants won by 6 wickets
14:00 Match 3 Scorecard	Abu Dhabi Knight Riders; 114/9 (20 overs)	v	Gulf Giants; 115/4 (14.2 overs)	Sheikh Zayed Cricket Stadium, Abu Dhabi; Umpires: Ruchira Palliyaguruge (SL) and Martin Saggers (Eng); Player of the match: Sanchit Sharma (Gulf Giants)
14:00 Match 3 Scorecard	Andre Russell 26 (12); Sanchit Sharma 3/9 (3 overs)		James Vince 65 (44); Sunil Narine 2/21 (4 overs)	Sheikh Zayed Cricket Stadium, Abu Dhabi; Umpires: Ruchira Palliyaguruge (SL) and Martin Saggers (Eng); Player of the match: Sanchit Sharma (Gulf Giants)
Abu Dhabi Knight Riders won the toss and elected to bat.				Sheikh Zayed Cricket Stadium, Abu Dhabi; Umpires: Ruchira Palliyaguruge (SL) and Martin Saggers (Eng); Player of the match: Sanchit Sharma (Gulf Giants)

15 January 2023	Sharjah Warriors; 145/5 (20 overs)	v	Desert Vipers; 148/3 (16.4 overs)	Desert Vipers won by 7 wickets
18:00 Match 4 Scorecard	Sharjah Warriors; 145/5 (20 overs)	v	Desert Vipers; 148/3 (16.4 overs)	Dubai International Cricket Stadium, Dubai; Umpires: Leslie Reifer (WI) and Shiju Sam (UAE); Player of the match: Alex Hales (Desert Vipers)
18:00 Match 4 Scorecard	Joe Denly 36* (33); Tymal Mills 1/11 (3 overs)		Alex Hales 83* (52); Moeen Ali 1/8 (1 over)	Dubai International Cricket Stadium, Dubai; Umpires: Leslie Reifer (WI) and Shiju Sam (UAE); Player of the match: Alex Hales (Desert Vipers)
Desert Vipers won the toss and elected to field.				Dubai International Cricket Stadium, Dubai; Umpires: Leslie Reifer (WI) and Shiju Sam (UAE); Player of the match: Alex Hales (Desert Vipers)

16 January 2023	Dubai Capitals; 182/8 (20 overs)	v	Gulf Giants; 183/4 (19 overs)	Gulf Giants won by 6 wickets
18:00 Match 5 Scorecard	Dubai Capitals; 182/8 (20 overs)	v	Gulf Giants; 183/4 (19 overs)	Dubai International Cricket Stadium, Dubai; Umpires: Rod Tucker (Aus) and Alex Wharf (Eng); Player of the match: James Vince (Gulf Giants)
18:00 Match 5 Scorecard	Robin Uthappa 79 (46); Rehan Ahmed 3/28 (4 overs)		James Vince 83* (56); Mujeeb Ur Rahman 2/36 (4 overs)	Dubai International Cricket Stadium, Dubai; Umpires: Rod Tucker (Aus) and Alex Wharf (Eng); Player of the match: James Vince (Gulf Giants)
Gulf Giants won the toss and elected to field.				Dubai International Cricket Stadium, Dubai; Umpires: Rod Tucker (Aus) and Alex Wharf (Eng); Player of the match: James Vince (Gulf Giants)

17 January 2023	Sharjah Warriors; 146/7 (20 overs)	v	MI Emirates; 147/4 (17.1 overs)	MI Emirates won by 6 wickets
18:00 Match 6 Scorecard	Sharjah Warriors; 146/7 (20 overs)	v	MI Emirates; 147/4 (17.1 overs)	Sharjah Cricket Stadium, Sharjah; Umpires: Akbar Ali (UAE) and Ruchira Palliyaguruge (SL); Player of the match: Dwayne Bravo (MI Emirates)
18:00 Match 6 Scorecard	Tom Kohler-Cadmore 55 (41); Dwayne Bravo 3/25 (4 overs)		Muhammad Waseem 40 (36); Junaid Siddique 2/24 (3 overs)	Sharjah Cricket Stadium, Sharjah; Umpires: Akbar Ali (UAE) and Ruchira Palliyaguruge (SL); Player of the match: Dwayne Bravo (MI Emirates)
MI Emirates won the toss and elected to field.				Sharjah Cricket Stadium, Sharjah; Umpires: Akbar Ali (UAE) and Ruchira Palliyaguruge (SL); Player of the match: Dwayne Bravo (MI Emirates)

18 January 2023	Abu Dhabi Knight Riders; 133/8 (20 overs)	v	Desert Vipers; 135/3 (15.4 overs)	Desert Vipers won by 7 wickets
18:00 Match 7 Scorecard	Abu Dhabi Knight Riders; 133/8 (20 overs)	v	Desert Vipers; 135/3 (15.4 overs)	Dubai International Cricket Stadium, Dubai; Umpires: Shiju Sam (UAE) and Rod Tucker (Aus); Player of the match: Wanindu Hasaranga (Desert Vipers)
18:00 Match 7 Scorecard	Brandon King 57 (44); Wanindu Hasaranga 3/18 (4 overs)		Alex Hales 64 (47); Akeal Hosein 1/24 (4 overs)	Dubai International Cricket Stadium, Dubai; Umpires: Shiju Sam (UAE) and Rod Tucker (Aus); Player of the match: Wanindu Hasaranga (Desert Vipers)
Desert Vipers won the toss and elected to field.				Dubai International Cricket Stadium, Dubai; Umpires: Shiju Sam (UAE) and Rod Tucker (Aus); Player of the match: Wanindu Hasaranga (Desert Vipers)

19 January 2023	Gulf Giants; 181/6 (20 overs)	v	Dubai Capitals; 80 (14.3 overs)	Gulf Giants won by 101 runs.
18:00 Match 8 Scorecard	Gulf Giants; 181/6 (20 overs)	v	Dubai Capitals; 80 (14.3 overs)	Sharjah Cricket Stadium, Sharjah; Umpires: Akbar Ali (UAE) and Ruchira Palliyaguruge (SL); Player of the match: James Vince (Gulf Giants)
18:00 Match 8 Scorecard	James Vince 76 (48); Akif Raja 2/23 (4 overs)		Dasun Shanaka 23 (19); David Wiese 3/3 (2 overs)	Sharjah Cricket Stadium, Sharjah; Umpires: Akbar Ali (UAE) and Ruchira Palliyaguruge (SL); Player of the match: James Vince (Gulf Giants)
Dubai Capitals won the toss and elected to field.				Sharjah Cricket Stadium, Sharjah; Umpires: Akbar Ali (UAE) and Ruchira Palliyaguruge (SL); Player of the match: James Vince (Gulf Giants)

20 January 2023	Desert Vipers; 219/4 (20 overs)	v	Abu Dhabi Knight Riders; 108 (15.1 overs)	Desert Vipers won by 111 runs.
18:00 Match 9 Scorecard	Desert Vipers; 219/4 (20 overs)	v	Abu Dhabi Knight Riders; 108 (15.1 overs)	Sheikh Zayed Cricket Stadium, Abu Dhabi; Umpires: Leslie Reifer (WI) and Alex Wharf (Eng); Player of the match: Alex Hales (Desert Vipers)
18:00 Match 9 Scorecard	Alex Hales 110 (59); Lahiru Kumara 2/31 (4 overs)		Andre Russell 57 (29); Sheldon Cottrell 3/13 (4 overs)	Sheikh Zayed Cricket Stadium, Abu Dhabi; Umpires: Leslie Reifer (WI) and Alex Wharf (Eng); Player of the match: Alex Hales (Desert Vipers)
Abu Dhabi Knight Riders won the toss and elected to field.				Sheikh Zayed Cricket Stadium, Abu Dhabi; Umpires: Leslie Reifer (WI) and Alex Wharf (Eng); Player of the match: Alex Hales (Desert Vipers)

21 January 2023	Dubai Capitals; 177/4 (20 overs)	v	Sharjah Warriors; 182/3 (14.4 overs)	Sharjah Warriors won by 7 wickets
14:00 Match 10 Scorecard	Dubai Capitals; 177/4 (20 overs)	v	Sharjah Warriors; 182/3 (14.4 overs)	Dubai International Cricket Stadium, Dubai; Umpires: Ruchira Palliyaguruge (SL) and Martin Saggers (Eng); Player of the match: Tom Kohler-Cadmore (Sharjah Warriors)
14:00 Match 10 Scorecard	Joe Root 80* (54); Chris Woakes 2/35 (4 overs)		Tom Kohler-Cadmore 106* (47); Akif Raja 2/34 (3 overs)	Dubai International Cricket Stadium, Dubai; Umpires: Ruchira Palliyaguruge (SL) and Martin Saggers (Eng); Player of the match: Tom Kohler-Cadmore (Sharjah Warriors)
Sharjah Warriors won the toss and elected to field.				Dubai International Cricket Stadium, Dubai; Umpires: Ruchira Palliyaguruge (SL) and Martin Saggers (Eng); Player of the match: Tom Kohler-Cadmore (Sharjah Warriors)

21 January 2023	Abu Dhabi Knight Riders; 170/7 (20 overs)	v	MI Emirates; 176/5 (20 overs)	MI Emirates won by 5 wickets.
18:00 Match 11 Scorecard	Abu Dhabi Knight Riders; 170/7 (20 overs)	v	MI Emirates; 176/5 (20 overs)	Sheikh Zayed Cricket Stadium, Abu Dhabi; Umpires: Shiju Sam (UAE) and Alex Wharf (Eng); Player of the match: Najibullah Zadran (MI Emirates)
18:00 Match 11 Scorecard	Dhananjaya de Silva 65 (40); Fazalhaq Farooqi 2/27 (4 overs)		Andre Fletcher 53 (43); Lahiru Kumara 2/34 (4 overs)	Sheikh Zayed Cricket Stadium, Abu Dhabi; Umpires: Shiju Sam (UAE) and Alex Wharf (Eng); Player of the match: Najibullah Zadran (MI Emirates)
MI Emirates won the toss and elected to field.				Sheikh Zayed Cricket Stadium, Abu Dhabi; Umpires: Shiju Sam (UAE) and Alex Wharf (Eng); Player of the match: Najibullah Zadran (MI Emirates)

22 January 2023	Desert Vipers; 195/4 (20 overs)	v	Gulf Giants; 196/5 (19.3 overs)	Gulf Giants won by 5 wickets
14:00 Match 12 Scorecard	Desert Vipers; 195/4 (20 overs)	v	Gulf Giants; 196/5 (19.3 overs)	Dubai International Cricket Stadium, Dubai; Umpires: Akbar Ali (UAE) and Martin Saggers (Eng); Player of the match: Shimron Hetmyer (Gulf Giants)
14:00 Match 12 Scorecard	Alex Hales 99 (57); Richard Gleeson 1/19 (4 overs)		Chris Lynn 71 (42); Sheldon Cottrell 2/24 (3.3 overs)	Dubai International Cricket Stadium, Dubai; Umpires: Akbar Ali (UAE) and Martin Saggers (Eng); Player of the match: Shimron Hetmyer (Gulf Giants)
Gulf Giants won the toss and elected to field.				Dubai International Cricket Stadium, Dubai; Umpires: Akbar Ali (UAE) and Martin Saggers (Eng); Player of the match: Shimron Hetmyer (Gulf Giants)

22 January 2023	Dubai Capitals; 222/3 (20 overs)	v	MI Emirates; 206/5 (20 overs)	Dubai Capitals won by 16 runs
18:00 Match 13 Scorecard	Dubai Capitals; 222/3 (20 overs)	v	MI Emirates; 206/5 (20 overs)	Sheikh Zayed Cricket Stadium, Abu Dhabi; Umpires: Leslie Reifer (WI) and Alex Wharf (Eng); Player of the match: Rovman Powell (Dubai Capitals)
18:00 Match 13 Scorecard	Rovman Powell 97 (41); Fazalhaq Farooqi 1/39 (4 overs)		Kieron Pollard 86 (38); Hazrat Luqman 2/24 (4 overs)	Sheikh Zayed Cricket Stadium, Abu Dhabi; Umpires: Leslie Reifer (WI) and Alex Wharf (Eng); Player of the match: Rovman Powell (Dubai Capitals)
MI Emirates won the toss and elected to field.				Sheikh Zayed Cricket Stadium, Abu Dhabi; Umpires: Leslie Reifer (WI) and Alex Wharf (Eng); Player of the match: Rovman Powell (Dubai Capitals)

23 January 2023	Sharjah Warriors; 151/7 (20 overs)	v	Gulf Giants; 130 (19.4 overs)	Sharjah Warriors won by 21 runs
18:00 Match 14 Scorecard	Sharjah Warriors; 151/7 (20 overs)	v	Gulf Giants; 130 (19.4 overs)	Dubai International Cricket Stadium, Dubai; Umpires: Akbar Ali (UAE) and Richard Kettleborough (Eng); Player of the match: Naveen-ul-Haq (Sharjah Warriors)
18:00 Match 14 Scorecard	Joe Denly 58 (43); Chris Jordan 3/25 (4 overs)		Chris Jordan 37 (26); Naveen-ul-Haq 5/38 (3.4 overs)	Dubai International Cricket Stadium, Dubai; Umpires: Akbar Ali (UAE) and Richard Kettleborough (Eng); Player of the match: Naveen-ul-Haq (Sharjah Warriors)
Gulf Giants won the toss and elected to field.				Dubai International Cricket Stadium, Dubai; Umpires: Akbar Ali (UAE) and Richard Kettleborough (Eng); Player of the match: Naveen-ul-Haq (Sharjah Warriors)

24 January 2023	MI Emirates; 169/5 (20 overs)	v	Desert Vipers; 170/3 (16.3 overs)	Desert Vipers won by 7 wickets.
18:00 Match 15 Scorecard	MI Emirates; 169/5 (20 overs)	v	Desert Vipers; 170/3 (16.3 overs)	Sheikh Zayed Cricket Stadium, Abu Dhabi; Umpires: Leslie Reifer (WI) and Shiju Sam (UAE); Player of the match: Sherfane Rutherford (Desert Vipers)
18:00 Match 15 Scorecard	Kieron Pollard 67* (39); Tom Curran 2/38 (4 overs)		Alex Hales 62* (44); Samit Patel 2/23 (2 overs)	Sheikh Zayed Cricket Stadium, Abu Dhabi; Umpires: Leslie Reifer (WI) and Shiju Sam (UAE); Player of the match: Sherfane Rutherford (Desert Vipers)
Desert Vipers won the toss and elected to field.				Sheikh Zayed Cricket Stadium, Abu Dhabi; Umpires: Leslie Reifer (WI) and Shiju Sam (UAE); Player of the match: Sherfane Rutherford (Desert Vipers)

25 January 2023	Gulf Giants	v	Abu Dhabi Knight Riders	Match Abandoned.
18:00 Match 16 Scorecard	Gulf Giants	v	Abu Dhabi Knight Riders	Dubai International Cricket Stadium, Dubai; Umpires: Richard Kettleborough (Eng) and Ruchira Palliyaguruge (SL)
Abu Dhabi Knight Riders won the toss and elected to field.; No play was possible due to rain.				Dubai International Cricket Stadium, Dubai; Umpires: Richard Kettleborough (Eng) and Ruchira Palliyaguruge (SL)

26 January 2023	Dubai Capitals; 17/4 (5 overs)	v	Sharjah Warriors	No Result.
18:00 Match 17 Scorecard	Dubai Capitals; 17/4 (5 overs)	v	Sharjah Warriors	Sharjah Cricket Stadium, Sharjah; Umpires: Rod Tucker (Aus) and Alex Wharf (Eng)
18:00 Match 17 Scorecard	Rovman Powell 5* (4); Junaid Siddique 2/4 (2 overs)			Sharjah Cricket Stadium, Sharjah; Umpires: Rod Tucker (Aus) and Alex Wharf (Eng)
Sharjah Warriors won the toss and elected to field.; No Further play was possible due to rain.				Sharjah Cricket Stadium, Sharjah; Umpires: Rod Tucker (Aus) and Alex Wharf (Eng)

27 January 2023	Gulf Giants	v	MI Emirates	Match Abandoned.
18:00 Match 18 Scorecard	Gulf Giants	v	MI Emirates	Dubai International Cricket Stadium, Dubai; Umpires: Ruchira Palliyaguruge (SL) and Martin Saggers (Eng)
MI Emirates won the toss and elected to field.; No play was possible due to rain.				Dubai International Cricket Stadium, Dubai; Umpires: Ruchira Palliyaguruge (SL) and Martin Saggers (Eng)

28 January 2023	Abu Dhabi Knight Riders; 149/4 (20 overs)	v	Sharjah Warriors; 150/6 (17 overs)	Sharjah Warriors won by 4 wickets.
13:00 Match 19 Scorecard	Abu Dhabi Knight Riders; 149/4 (20 overs)	v	Sharjah Warriors; 150/6 (17 overs)	Sharjah Cricket Stadium, Sharjah; Umpires: Richard Kettleborough (Eng) and Leslie Reifer (WI); Player of the match: Rahmanullah Gurbaz (Sharjah Warriors)
13:00 Match 19 Scorecard	Paul Stirling 55 (50); Paul Walter 2/29 (4 overs)		Rahmanullah Gurbaz 56 (39); Lahiru Kumara 3/36 (4 overs)	Sharjah Cricket Stadium, Sharjah; Umpires: Richard Kettleborough (Eng) and Leslie Reifer (WI); Player of the match: Rahmanullah Gurbaz (Sharjah Warriors)
Sharjah Warriors won the toss and elected to field.				Sharjah Cricket Stadium, Sharjah; Umpires: Richard Kettleborough (Eng) and Leslie Reifer (WI); Player of the match: Rahmanullah Gurbaz (Sharjah Warriors)

28 January 2023	Desert Vipers; 149/9 (20 overs)	v	Dubai Capitals; 137/5 (20 overs)	Desert Vipers won by 12 runs.
18:00 Match 20 Scorecard	Desert Vipers; 149/9 (20 overs)	v	Dubai Capitals; 137/5 (20 overs)	Dubai International Cricket Stadium, Dubai; Umpires: Martin Saggers (Eng) and Rod Tucker (Aus); Player of the match: Adam Zampa (Dubai Capitals)
18:00 Match 20 Scorecard	Colin Munro 40 (32); Adam Zampa 3/16 (4 overs)		Yusuf Pathan 35* (26); Rohan Mustafa 2/27 (4 overs)	Dubai International Cricket Stadium, Dubai; Umpires: Martin Saggers (Eng) and Rod Tucker (Aus); Player of the match: Adam Zampa (Dubai Capitals)
Dubai Capitals won the toss and elected to field.				Dubai International Cricket Stadium, Dubai; Umpires: Martin Saggers (Eng) and Rod Tucker (Aus); Player of the match: Adam Zampa (Dubai Capitals)

29 January 2023	MI Emirates; 241/3 (20 overs)	v	Desert Vipers; 84 (12.1 overs)	MI Emirates won by 157 runs.
18:00 Match 21 Scorecard	MI Emirates; 241/3 (20 overs)	v	Desert Vipers; 84 (12.1 overs)	Sharjah Cricket Stadium, Sharjah; Umpires: Richard Kettleborough (Eng) and Alex Wharf (Eng); Player of the match: Muhammad Waseem (MI Emirates)
18:00 Match 21 Scorecard	Muhammad Waseem 86 (44); Tom Curran 2/63 (4 overs)		Tom Curran 12 (12); Fazalhaq Farooqi 3/13 (3 overs)	Sharjah Cricket Stadium, Sharjah; Umpires: Richard Kettleborough (Eng) and Alex Wharf (Eng); Player of the match: Muhammad Waseem (MI Emirates)
Desert Vipers won the toss and elected to field.				Sharjah Cricket Stadium, Sharjah; Umpires: Richard Kettleborough (Eng) and Alex Wharf (Eng); Player of the match: Muhammad Waseem (MI Emirates)

30 January 2023	Abu Dhabi Knight Riders; 149/9 (20 overs)	v	Dubai Capitals; 150/3 (17.4 overs)	Dubai Capitals won by 7 wickets
18:00 Match 22 Scorecard	Abu Dhabi Knight Riders; 149/9 (20 overs)	v	Dubai Capitals; 150/3 (17.4 overs)	Sheikh Zayed Cricket Stadium, Abu Dhabi; Umpires: Richard Kettleborough (Eng) and Leslie Reifer (WI); Player of the match: Adam Zampa (Dubai Capitals)
18:00 Match 22 Scorecard	Joe Clarke 52 (27); Adam Zampa 3/16 (4 overs)		George Munsey 57 (43); Akeal Hosein 1/21 (3.4 overs)	Sheikh Zayed Cricket Stadium, Abu Dhabi; Umpires: Richard Kettleborough (Eng) and Leslie Reifer (WI); Player of the match: Adam Zampa (Dubai Capitals)
Dubai Capitals won the toss and elected to field.				Sheikh Zayed Cricket Stadium, Abu Dhabi; Umpires: Richard Kettleborough (Eng) and Leslie Reifer (WI); Player of the match: Adam Zampa (Dubai Capitals)

31 January 2023	Desert Vipers; 148/6 (20 overs)	v	Sharjah Warriors; 126/8 (20 overs)	Desert Vipers won by 22 runs
18:00 Match 23 Scorecard	Desert Vipers; 148/6 (20 overs)	v	Sharjah Warriors; 126/8 (20 overs)	Sharjah Cricket Stadium, Sharjah; Umpires: Martin Saggers (Eng) and Rod Tucker (Aus); Player of the match: Wanindu Hasaranga (Desert Vipers)
18:00 Match 23 Scorecard	Benny Howell 34* (23); Noor Ahmad 2/27 (4 overs)		Paul Walter 27 (23); Wanindu Hasaranga 3/13 (4 overs)	Sharjah Cricket Stadium, Sharjah; Umpires: Martin Saggers (Eng) and Rod Tucker (Aus); Player of the match: Wanindu Hasaranga (Desert Vipers)
Desert Vipers won the toss and elected to bat.				Sharjah Cricket Stadium, Sharjah; Umpires: Martin Saggers (Eng) and Rod Tucker (Aus); Player of the match: Wanindu Hasaranga (Desert Vipers)

1 February 2023	MI Emirates; 139 (19.5 overs)	v	Gulf Giants; 143/5 (20 overs)	Gulf Giants won by 5 wickets
18:00 Match 24 Scorecard	MI Emirates; 139 (19.5 overs)	v	Gulf Giants; 143/5 (20 overs)	Sheikh Zayed Cricket Stadium, Abu Dhabi; Umpires: Martin Saggers (Eng) and Rod Tucker (Aus); Player of the match: Chris Jordan (Gulf Giants)
18:00 Match 24 Scorecard	Nicholas Pooran 42 (29); Chris Jordan 3/12 (3.5 overs)		Tom Banton 45 (39); Dwayne Bravo 2/32 (4 overs)	Sheikh Zayed Cricket Stadium, Abu Dhabi; Umpires: Martin Saggers (Eng) and Rod Tucker (Aus); Player of the match: Chris Jordan (Gulf Giants)
Gulf Giants won the toss and elected to field.				Sheikh Zayed Cricket Stadium, Abu Dhabi; Umpires: Martin Saggers (Eng) and Rod Tucker (Aus); Player of the match: Chris Jordan (Gulf Giants)

2 February 2023	Desert Vipers; 182/7 (20 overs)	v	Dubai Capitals; 160/7 (20 overs)	Desert Vipers won by 22 runs.
18:00 Match 25 Scorecard	Desert Vipers; 182/7 (20 overs)	v	Dubai Capitals; 160/7 (20 overs)	Dubai International Cricket Stadium, Dubai; Umpires: Richard Kettleborough (Eng) and Alex Wharf (Eng); Player of the match: Sherfane Rutherford (Desert Vipers)
18:00 Match 25 Scorecard	Sam Billings 54 (48); Fred Klaassen 3/34 (4 overs)		Sikandar Raza 41 (32); Sheldon Cottrell 2/36 (4 overs); Luke Wood 2/36 (4 overs)	Dubai International Cricket Stadium, Dubai; Umpires: Richard Kettleborough (Eng) and Alex Wharf (Eng); Player of the match: Sherfane Rutherford (Desert Vipers)
Dubai Capitals won the toss and elected to field.				Dubai International Cricket Stadium, Dubai; Umpires: Richard Kettleborough (Eng) and Alex Wharf (Eng); Player of the match: Sherfane Rutherford (Desert Vipers)

3 February 2023	MI Emirates; 180/4 (20 overs)	v	Abu Dhabi Knight Riders; 162 (19.2 overs)	MI Emirates won by 18 runs.
18:00 Match 26 Scorecard	MI Emirates; 180/4 (20 overs)	v	Abu Dhabi Knight Riders; 162 (19.2 overs)	Sheikh Zayed Cricket Stadium, Abu Dhabi; Umpires: Akbar Ali (UAE) and Ruchira Palliyaguruge (SL); Player of the match: Kieron Pollard (MI Emirates)
18:00 Match 26 Scorecard	Muhammad Waseem 60 (43); Sabir Ali 1/21 (2 overs)		Andre Russell 42 (22); Dwayne Bravo 3/37 (4 overs)	Sheikh Zayed Cricket Stadium, Abu Dhabi; Umpires: Akbar Ali (UAE) and Ruchira Palliyaguruge (SL); Player of the match: Kieron Pollard (MI Emirates)
Abu Dhabi Knight Riders won the toss and elected to field.				Sheikh Zayed Cricket Stadium, Abu Dhabi; Umpires: Akbar Ali (UAE) and Ruchira Palliyaguruge (SL); Player of the match: Kieron Pollard (MI Emirates)

4 February 2023	Gulf Giants; 180/6 (20 overs)	v	Desert Vipers; 155/6 (20 overs)	Gulf Giants won by 25 runs.
14:00 Match 27 Scorecard	Gulf Giants; 180/6 (20 overs)	v	Desert Vipers; 155/6 (20 overs)	Dubai International Cricket Stadium, Dubai; Umpires: Leslie Reifer (WI) and Shiju Sam (UAE); Player of the match: Shimron Hetmyer (Gulf Giants)
14:00 Match 27 Scorecard	Shimron Hetmyer 54 (35); Matheesha Pathirana 2/36 (4 overs)		Tom Curran 42* (33); Gerhard Erasmus 1/1 (1 over)	Dubai International Cricket Stadium, Dubai; Umpires: Leslie Reifer (WI) and Shiju Sam (UAE); Player of the match: Shimron Hetmyer (Gulf Giants)
Desert Vipers won the toss and elected to field.				Dubai International Cricket Stadium, Dubai; Umpires: Leslie Reifer (WI) and Shiju Sam (UAE); Player of the match: Shimron Hetmyer (Gulf Giants)

4 February 2023	Sharjah Warriors; 130/9 (20 overs)	v	Abu Dhabi Knight Riders; 133/5 (16.4 overs)	Abu Dhabi Knight Riders won by 5 wickets.
18:00 Match 28 Scorecard	Sharjah Warriors; 130/9 (20 overs)	v	Abu Dhabi Knight Riders; 133/5 (16.4 overs)	Sheikh Zayed Cricket Stadium, Abu Dhabi; Umpires: Ruchira Palliyaguruge (SL) and Rod Tucker (Aus); Player of the match: Joe Clarke (Abu Dhabi Knight Riders)
18:00 Match 28 Scorecard	Tom Kohler-Cadmore 46 (40); Matiullah Khan 2/24 (3 overs)		Joe Clarke 54 (32); Muhammad Jawadullah 3/24 (4 overs)	Sheikh Zayed Cricket Stadium, Abu Dhabi; Umpires: Ruchira Palliyaguruge (SL) and Rod Tucker (Aus); Player of the match: Joe Clarke (Abu Dhabi Knight Riders)
Abu Dhabi Knight Riders won the toss and elected to field.				Sheikh Zayed Cricket Stadium, Abu Dhabi; Umpires: Ruchira Palliyaguruge (SL) and Rod Tucker (Aus); Player of the match: Joe Clarke (Abu Dhabi Knight Riders)

5 February 2023	MI Emirates; 164/7 (20 overs)	v	Dubai Capitals; 166/3 (18.1 overs)	Dubai Capitals won by 7 wickets.
18:00 Match 29 Scorecard	MI Emirates; 164/7 (20 overs)	v	Dubai Capitals; 166/3 (18.1 overs)	Dubai International Cricket Stadium, Dubai; Umpires: Shiju Sam (UAE) and Alex Wharf (Eng); Player of the match: Dasun Shanaka (Dubai Capitals)
18:00 Match 29 Scorecard	Nicholas Pooran 43 (31); Jake Ball 3/37 (4 overs)		Dasun Shanaka 58* (36); Zahir Khan 2/32 (4 overs)	Dubai International Cricket Stadium, Dubai; Umpires: Shiju Sam (UAE) and Alex Wharf (Eng); Player of the match: Dasun Shanaka (Dubai Capitals)
Dubai Capitals won the toss and elected to field.				Dubai International Cricket Stadium, Dubai; Umpires: Shiju Sam (UAE) and Alex Wharf (Eng); Player of the match: Dasun Shanaka (Dubai Capitals)

6 February 2023	Sharjah Warriors; 107 (18.3 overs)	v	Gulf Giants; 108/3 (16.3 overs)	Gulf Giants won by 7 wickets
18:00 Match 30 Scorecard	Sharjah Warriors; 107 (18.3 overs)	v	Gulf Giants; 108/3 (16.3 overs)	Sharjah Cricket Stadium, Sharjah; Umpires: Akbar Ali (UAE) and Martin Saggers (Eng); Player of the match: David Wiese (Gulf Giants)
18:00 Match 30 Scorecard	Tom Kohler-Cadmore 32 (19); David Wiese 5/20 (4 overs)		Colin de Grandhomme 35 (28); Junaid Siddique 2/27 (4 overs)	Sharjah Cricket Stadium, Sharjah; Umpires: Akbar Ali (UAE) and Martin Saggers (Eng); Player of the match: David Wiese (Gulf Giants)
Gulf Giants won the toss and elected to field.				Sharjah Cricket Stadium, Sharjah; Umpires: Akbar Ali (UAE) and Martin Saggers (Eng); Player of the match: David Wiese (Gulf Giants)

== Playoffs ==
Qualifier 1 and Eliminator
8 February 2023 — Dubai
1	Gulf Giants	159 (19.4 overs)
2	Desert Vipers	178/7 (20 overs)
9 February 2023 — Sharjah
3	MI Emirates	152/2 (16.4 overs)
4	Dubai Capitals	151/5 (20 overs)

Qualifier 2
10 February 2023 — Dubai
1	Gulf Giants	168/6 (18.1 overs)
3	MI Emirates	167/5 (20 overs)

Final
12 February 2023 — Dubai
2	Desert Vipers	146/8 (20 overs)
1	Gulf Giants	149/3 (18.4 overs)

=== Qualifier 1 ===
8 February 2023	Desert Vipers; 178/7 (20 overs)	v	Gulf Giants; 159 (19.4 overs)	Desert Vipers won by 19 runs
18.00 Match 31 Scorecard	Desert Vipers; 178/7 (20 overs)	v	Gulf Giants; 159 (19.4 overs)	Dubai International Cricket Stadium, Dubai; Umpires: Richard Kettleborough (Eng) and Alex Wharf (Eng); Player of the match: Tom Curran (Desert Vipers)
18.00 Match 31 Scorecard	Sherfane Rutherford 37* (19); Chris Jordan 3/40 (4 overs)		Shimron Hetmyer 36 (21); Tom Curran 4/31 (4 overs)	Dubai International Cricket Stadium, Dubai; Umpires: Richard Kettleborough (Eng) and Alex Wharf (Eng); Player of the match: Tom Curran (Desert Vipers)
Gulf Giants won the toss and elected to field.				Dubai International Cricket Stadium, Dubai; Umpires: Richard Kettleborough (Eng) and Alex Wharf (Eng); Player of the match: Tom Curran (Desert Vipers)

=== Eliminator ===
9 February 2023	Dubai Capitals; 151/5 (20 overs)	v	MI Emirates; 152/2 (16.4 overs)	MI Emirates won by 8 wickets
18:00 Match 32 Scorecard	Dubai Capitals; 151/5 (20 overs)	v	MI Emirates; 152/2 (16.4 overs)	Sharjah Cricket Stadium, Sharjah; Umpires: Richard Kettleborough (Eng) and Ruchira Palliyaguruge (SL); Player of the match: Nicholas Pooran (MI Emirates)
18:00 Match 32 Scorecard	George Munsey 51 (43); Trent Boult 2/19 (4 overs)		Andre Fletcher 68* (45); Jake Ball 1/23 (3 overs)	Sharjah Cricket Stadium, Sharjah; Umpires: Richard Kettleborough (Eng) and Ruchira Palliyaguruge (SL); Player of the match: Nicholas Pooran (MI Emirates)
MI Emirates won the toss and elected to field.				Sharjah Cricket Stadium, Sharjah; Umpires: Richard Kettleborough (Eng) and Ruchira Palliyaguruge (SL); Player of the match: Nicholas Pooran (MI Emirates)

=== Qualifier 2 ===
10 February 2023	MI Emirates; 167/5 (20 overs)	v	Gulf Giants; 168/6 (18.1 overs)	Gulf Giants won by 4 wickets
18:00 Match 33 Scorecard	MI Emirates; 167/5 (20 overs)	v	Gulf Giants; 168/6 (18.1 overs)	Dubai International Cricket Stadium, Dubai; Umpires: Leslie Reifer (WI) and Martin Saggers (Eng); Player of the match: James Vince (Gulf Giants)
18:00 Match 33 Scorecard	Kieron Pollard 57* (35); Chris Jordan 2/25 (4 overs)		James Vince 83* (56); Fazalhaq Farooqi 2/27 (3.1 overs)	Dubai International Cricket Stadium, Dubai; Umpires: Leslie Reifer (WI) and Martin Saggers (Eng); Player of the match: James Vince (Gulf Giants)
Gulf Giants won the toss and elected to field.				Dubai International Cricket Stadium, Dubai; Umpires: Leslie Reifer (WI) and Martin Saggers (Eng); Player of the match: James Vince (Gulf Giants)

=== Final ===
12 February 2023	Desert Vipers; 146/8 (20 overs)	v	Gulf Giants; 149/3 (18.4 overs)	Gulf Giants won by 7 wickets
18:00 Match 34 Scorecard	Desert Vipers; 146/8 (20 overs)	v	Gulf Giants; 149/3 (18.4 overs)	Dubai International Cricket Stadium, Dubai; Umpires: Richard Kettleborough (Eng) and Alex Wharf (Eng); Player of the match: Carlos Brathwaite (Gulf Giants)
18:00 Match 34 Scorecard	Wanindu Hasaranga 55 (27); Carlos Brathwaite 3/19 (4 overs)		Chris Lynn 72* (50); Wanindu Hasaranga 1/28 (4 overs)	Dubai International Cricket Stadium, Dubai; Umpires: Richard Kettleborough (Eng) and Alex Wharf (Eng); Player of the match: Carlos Brathwaite (Gulf Giants)
Gulf Giants won the toss and elected to field.				Dubai International Cricket Stadium, Dubai; Umpires: Richard Kettleborough (Eng) and Alex Wharf (Eng); Player of the match: Carlos Brathwaite (Gulf Giants)

== Awards ==
Award	Winner	Team
Most runs	Alex Hales	Desert Vipers
Most wickets	Chris Jordan	Gulf Giants
Most Valuable Player (MVP)	Chris Jordan	Gulf Giants
Best UAE Player	Muhammad Waseem	MI Emirates
