= Desert Vipers =

Emirati Twenty20 cricket team

- League: International League T20

Personnel
- Captain: Babar Azam
- Coach: James Foster
- Owner: Avram Glazer

Team information
- Colours: Red and Black
- Founded: 2023; 3 years ago
- Home ground: Sharjah Cricket Stadium, Sharjah
- Capacity: 16,000

History
- Twenty20 debut: v. Sharjah Warriors at Dubai International Cricket Stadium, Dubai; 15 January 2023
- ILT20 wins: 1 (2025–26)
- Official website: Desert Vipers
T20 kit

The Desert Vipers is a professional Twenty20 franchise cricket team that plays in the Emirati International League T20 (ILT20). It was one of six teams that were announced for the inaugural season (2023); it was founded in 2022 and is owned by Lancer Capital LLC.

The team's chief executive officer is Phil Oliver; the cricket director is Tom Moody. The team is coached by James Foster and captained by Lockie Ferguson. The Vipers were runners-up in the inaugural season of the tournament, finished 5th in Season 2, were runners-up again in Season 3, and finally the champions in Season 4.

== History ==
In August 2022, the Emirates Cricket Board (ECB) announced the establishment of the International League T20, to be started in 2023. The teams for the competition, representing three different cities of the United Arab Emirates, and three general teams which were not tied exclusively to one city, were put up for auction in the UAE in September 2022. The franchise was purchased by Manchester United FC CEO Avram Glazer. The team unveiled their name Desert Vipers, logo and jersey in January 2023, through their social media handles.

== Current squad ==
As of 2 October 2026

- Players with international caps are listed in **bold**.

Name	Nationality	Birth date	Batting style	Bowling style	Year	Notes
Batsmen
**Harry Tector**	Ireland	6 December 1999 (age 26)	Right-handed	Right-arm off break	2026	
**Dan Lawrence**	England	12 July 1997 (age 29)	Right-handed	Right-arm off break	2026	
**Shimron Hetmyer**	West Indies	26 December 1996 (age 29)	Left-handed	Right-arm leg break	2025	
Joe Clarke	England	26 May 1996 (age 30)	Right-handed	Right-arm off break	2026	
Hassan Nawaz	Pakistan	21 August 2002 (age 24)	Right-handed	Right-arm medium	2025	
**Faisal Khan**	Saudi Arabia	2 November 1996 (age 30)	Right-handed	Right-arm off break	2025	
**Bilal Tahir**	Kuwait	31 May 1998 (age 28)	Left-handed	Leg break	2025	
**Fakhar Zaman**	Pakistan	10 April 1990 (age 36)	Left-handed	Slow left-arm orthodox	2025	
All-rounders
**Sam Curran**	England	3 June 1998 (age 28)	Left-handed	Left-arm medium-fast	2023	
**Wanindu Hasaranga**	Sri Lanka	29 July 1997 (age 29)	Right-handed	Right-arm leg break	2023	
Wicket-keepers
**Vriitya Aravind**	United Arab Emirates	11 June 2002 (age 24)	Right-handed		2025	
**Andries Gous**	United States	24 November 1993 (age 32)	Right-handed		2025	
Pace bowlers
**Lockie Ferguson (capt)**	New Zealand	13 June 1991 (age 35)	Right-handed	Right-arm fast	2025	
Sanjay Pahal	India	29 June 1993 (age 33)	Right-handed	Right-arm medium	2025	
**David Payne**	England	15 February 1991 (age 35)	Right-handed	Left-arm fast-medium	2025	
Faridoon Dawoodzai	Afghanistan	26 November 2005 (age 20)	Right-handed	Left-arm fast	2025	
**Naseem Shah**	Pakistan	15 February 2003 (age 23)	Right-handed	Right-arm fast	2025	
**Babar Azam**	Pakistan	15 October 1994 (age 32)	Right-handed	Right-arm spin-bowl	2026	
Khuzaima Tanveer	United Arab Emirates	20 December 1999 (age 26)	Right-handed	Right-arm fast	2025	
Spin bowlers
**Qais Ahmad**	Afghanistan	15 August 2000 (age 26)	Right-handed	Right-arm leg break	2025	

== Statistics ==
=== Season summary ===
Season	League standing	Final standing
2023	2nd out of 6	Runner Up
2024	5th out of 6	League Stage
2025	1st out of 6	Runner Up
2026	1st out of 6	Champions

== Administration and support staff ==
Position	Name
CEO	Phil Oliver
Director of cricket	Tom Moody
Head coach	James Foster
Batting coach	Neil McKenzie
Fast bowling coach	Azhar Mahmood
Spin bowling coach	Carl Crowe
Fielding coach	Simon Helmot

- Source

== Sustainability ==
The Desert Vipers became the first cricket franchise in the world to make their full season carbon footprint public, when they published their Season 1 footprint of 573 tonnes of carbon dioxide in 2023. In Season 2, they hosted their first 'Sustainability Match', which aimed to celebrate their achievements to date and trial new sustainability initiatives. They are Dubai's first signatory to the United Nations Sports for Climate Action Framework, and they have committed to Net Zero by 2040.

In Season 4 (2025–26) they unveiled a green playing kit as a sign of commitment to their sustainability values.
