= Martin Saggers =

English cricketer and umpire

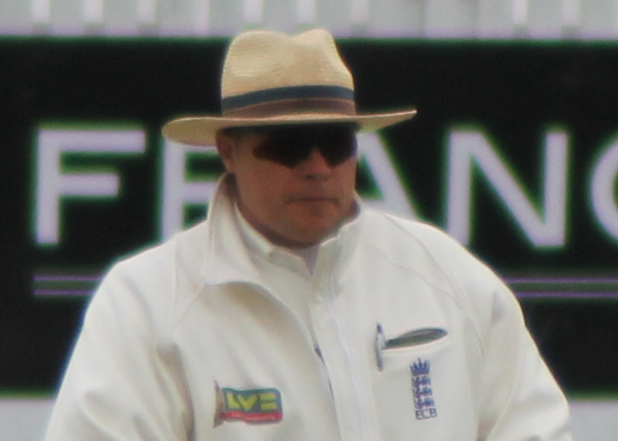

Personal information
- Full name: Martin John Saggers
- Born: 23 May 1972 (age 54); King's Lynn, Norfolk, England
- Height: 6 ft 2 in (1.88 m)
- Batting: Right-handed
- Bowling: Right arm fast-medium
- Role: Bowler

International information
- National side: England
- Test debut (cap 621): 29 October 2003 v Bangladesh
- Last Test: 13 June 2004 v New Zealand

Domestic team information
- Years: Team
- 1996–1998: Durham
- 1998–2009: Kent (squad no. 33)
- 2007: Essex (loan)

Umpiring information
- ODIs umpired: 17 (2020–2026)
- T20Is umpired: 28 (2020–2026)
- WTests umpired: 1 (2019–2019)
- WODIs umpired: 10 (2011–2022)
- WT20Is umpired: 7 (2012–2021)
- FC umpired: 175 (2011–present)
- LA umpired: 71 (2011–present)
- T20 umpired: 194 (2010–present)

Career statistics
Competition	Test	FC	LA	T20
Matches	3	119	124	10
Runs scored	1	1,165	313	5
Batting average	0.33	11.20	9.20	5.00
100s/50s	0/0	0/2	0/0	0/0
Top score	1	64	34*	5
Balls bowled	493	20,676	5,622	186
Wickets	7	415	166	6
Bowling average	35.28	25.33	25.47	25.47
5 wickets in innings	0	18	2	0
10 wickets in match	0	0	0	0
Best bowling	2/29	7/79	5/22	2/14
Catches/stumpings	1/–	27/–	23/–	2/–
- Source: Cricinfo, 05 October 2026

Martin John Saggers (born 23 May 1972) is an English county cricket umpire and a retired English cricketer. He played international cricket for the England cricket team, including appearing in three Test matches, and spent the majority of his first-class cricket career at Kent County Cricket Club. Saggers was born in King's Lynn in Norfolk.

Saggers had little success in his three seasons with Durham between 1996 and 1998, but then joined Kent and from 2000 to 2003 took more than 50 first-class wickets each year, his best being 83 in 2002. He also played for Essex on loan in 2007. He played for his native Norfolk in minor county matches in 1995–6.

Saggers made his Test match debut in 2003/04, as a replacement for the injured Andrew Flintoff in Dhaka, and also played in two of the three Tests against New Zealand the following summer. At Leeds he took the wicket of Mark Richardson with his first ball, but some wayward bowling and poor performances with the bat led to him being dropped for the games against the West Indies. With the bat, he scored 1, 0 and 0 in three innings, finishing his Test career with a batting average of 0.33.

Saggers suffered a knee injury in August 2009, and a month later announced his retirement from professional cricket. Graham Johnson, Kent's chairman of cricket, paid tribute to Saggers, saying "We owe Martin a great deal, especially during a period when he was our seam attack. Quite rightly, on the basis of this success, he received recognition at International level. Always enthusiastic and positive during his career, he will carry these qualities into his plans for what follows after cricket".

In 2012 Saggers became a full-time cricket umpire, standing in County Championship matches in England.

In 2020, he was appointed to the ICC International Umpires' Panel. He was one of the on-field umpires for the 2022 ICC Under-19 Cricket World Cup in the West Indies.

== See also ==
- List of One Day International cricket umpires
- List of Twenty20 International cricket umpires
