= Shimron Hetmyer =

West Indian cricketer (born 1996)

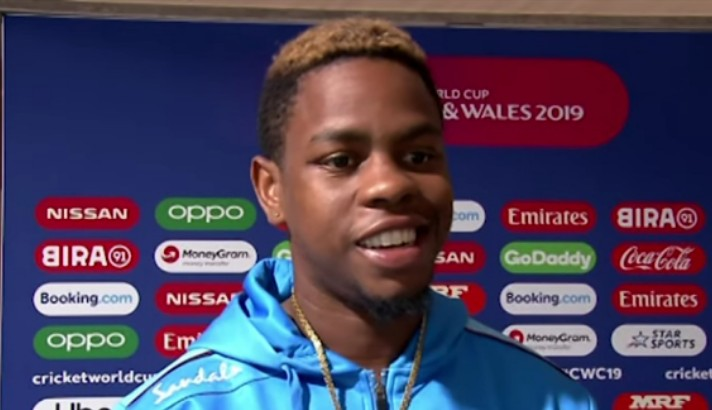
- Hetmyer during the Cricket World Cup 2019

Personal information
- Full name: Shimron Odilon Hetmyer
- Born: 26 December 1996 (age 29); Cumberland, East Berbice-Corentyne, Guyana
- Batting: Left-handed
- Role: Middle-order batter

International information
- National side: West Indies (2017–present)
- Test debut (cap 310): 21 April 2017 v Pakistan
- Last Test: 27 November 2019 v Afghanistan
- ODI debut (cap 183): 20 December 2017 v New Zealand
- Last ODI: 21 July 2026 v New Zealand
- ODI shirt no.: 2
- T20I debut (cap 69): 1 January 2018 v New Zealand
- Last T20I: 14 June 2026 v Sri Lanka
- T20I shirt no.: 2

Domestic team information
- Years: Team
- 2014–present: Guyana
- 2016–present: Guyana Amazon Warriors
- 2019: Royal Challengers Bangalore
- 2020–2021: Delhi Capitals
- 2021: Multan Sultans
- 2022-present: Rajasthan Royals
- 2024: London Spirit
- 2025: Khulna Tigers

Career statistics
Competition	Test	ODI	T20I	FC
Matches	16	59	85	41
Runs scored	838	1,638	1,678	2,163
Batting average	27.93	32.76	24.67	30.46
100s/50s	0/5	5/5	0/9	1/12
Top score	93	139	85	107
Catches/stumpings	7/0	23/0	43/0	32/0
- Source: Cricinfo, 28 July 2026

Shimron Odilon Hetmyer (born 26 December 1996) is a Guyanese cricketer who plays as a top order batsman for the West Indies cricket team. Hetmyer captained the Windies to win the 2016 Under-19 Cricket World Cup. During 2018 the International Cricket Council (ICC) named Hetmyer as one of the five breakout stars in men's cricket. He was also the captain of the Guyana Amazon Warriors in the 2022 season of the Caribbean Premier League.

== Domestic and T20 franchise career ==
He made his Twenty20 (T20) debut in the 2016 Caribbean Premier League (CPL) for the Guyana Amazon Warriors, and was retained for the 2017 edition. In August 2018, he became the youngest batsman to score a century in the CPL, when he made 100 runs for Guyana Amazon Warriors against the Jamaica Tallawahs.

In October 2018, Cricket West Indies (CWI) awarded him a red-ball contract for the 2018–19 season.

In December 2018, he was bought by the Royal Challengers Bangalore in the player auction for the 2019 Indian Premier League. In March 2019, he was named as one of eight players to watch by the International Cricket Council (ICC) ahead of the 2019 Indian Premier League tournament. He was released by the Royal Challengers Bangalore ahead of the 2020 IPL auction. In the 2020 IPL auction, he was bought by the Delhi Capitals ahead of the 2020 Indian Premier League.

In July 2020, he was named in the Guyana Amazon Warriors squad for the 2020 Caribbean Premier League.

In May 2021, in the mini-player replacement draft for the remainder of the postponed 2021 Pakistan Super League, Hetmyer was signed by the Multan Sultans as a replacement for Mahmudullah.

In the 2022 IPL Auction, Hetmyer was bought by the Rajasthan Royals.

Shimron Hetmyer made his BPL debut for Khulna Tigers in the 2025 Bangladesh Premier League on 2 February 2025.

Hetmyer hit his 2nd T20 century against the Trinbago Knight Riders during the 2026 Caribbean Premier League, smashing an unbeaten 111 runs of just 43 balls.During the qualifier 2 of the same season, Hetmyer smashed a century of just 45 balls, hitting 4 fours and 8 sixes against the Jamaica Kingsmen. He became the second player in CPL history to hit 2 centuries in the same season.

== International career ==
He represented the West Indies at Under-19 level, captaining the team to prevail in the 2016 Under-19 Cricket World Cup in Bangladesh, by defeating India in the tournament's final. Hetmyer scored two half centuries for the Windies during the World Cup.

In April 2017, he was named in the West Indies Test squad for their series against Pakistan. He made his Test debut for the West Indies against Pakistan on 21 April 2017.

In December 2017, he was added to the West Indies' One Day International (ODI) squad ahead of their series against New Zealand. He made his ODI debut for the West Indies against New Zealand on 20 December 2017. He was also added to the West Indies' Twenty20 International (T20I) squad for their series against New Zealand. He made his T20I debut for the West Indies against New Zealand on 1 January 2018.

On 6 March 2018, in the 2018 Cricket World Cup Qualifier, he scored his first ODI century, batting against the United Arab Emirates at the Old Hararians ground in Harare. The West Indies won the game by 60 runs and Hetmyer was named the man of the match.

In February 2019, Hetmyer scored the fastest century by a West Indies batsman against England in an ODI match, doing so from 82 balls.

In April 2019, he was named in the West Indies' squad for the 2019 Cricket World Cup. The International Cricket Council (ICC) named him as one of the five exciting talents making their Cricket World Cup debut. On 17 June 2019, in the match against Bangladesh, Hetmyer scored his 1,000th run in ODIs.

In September 2021, Hetmyer was named in the West Indies' squad for the 2021 ICC Men's T20 World Cup.

Hetmyer was dropped from the West Indies' squad for the tour of Australia and the 2022 ICC Men's T20 World Cup after missing his "rescheduled" flight to Australia.

In May 2024, he was named in the West Indies squad for the 2024 ICC Men's T20 World Cup tournament.

Hetmeyer was included in West Indies' squad for the 2026 ICC Men's T20 World Cup. In the tournament Hetmeyer had a notable outing against Zimbabwe in the Super 8 at the Whankede where he score 85 off 34 balls, and in doing so setting the record for the fastest T20 World Cup half-century by a West Indian, as he awarded the Man Of The Match after the West Indies defeated Zimbabwe by 107 runs.

== Personal life ==
On 8 May 2022, he announced the birth of his first child with wife Nirvani, his son was born while Hetmyer was playing in the IPL.
