= List of 2025–26 International League T20 auctions and personnel signings =

2025–26 International League T20 Player Auction

General information
- Sport: Cricket
- Date: 1 October 2025
- Time: 14:00 GST (UTC+04:00)
- Location: Four Seasons Hotel, Jumeirah, Dubai, United Arab Emirates
- Networks: ZEE5 (India); YouTube (Rest of the World)

Overview
- League: 2025–26 International League T20
- Teams: 6

This is a list of auction and personnel signings for the 2025–26 International League T20 cricket tournament, held in the United Arab Emirates, and organised by the Emirates Cricket Board.

== Background ==
For the first time, in the 2025–26 season, a player auction was held in ILT20 replacing the draft used in previous seasons. The auction was held in Jumeirah, Dubai on 1 October 2025.

The teams had already announced retentions and direct signings on 7 July 2025 and could spend USD 800,000 during the auction, with an overall squad budget ranging from USD 1.5 million to USD 2 million.

A total of 196 players were shortlisted for the auction, categorized by nationality and experience. Indian spinner Ravichandran Ashwin entered the auction with the highest base price of USD 120,000, the only player in the six-figure bracket. Other players were listed in base price categories of USD 80,000, USD 40,000, and USD 10,000.

Each franchise is allowed to build a squad of 19 to 21 players, excluding wildcard picks. Squad composition rules require a minimum of 11 players from ICC Full Member nations, four from the UAE, one each from Kuwait and Saudi Arabia, and two from other Associate Member countries. Teams are also permitted to sign up to two wildcard players after the auction, with a separate budget of USD 250,000 for such additions.

A Right-to-Match (RTM) card is available for each team, applicable only to UAE players who were part of their 2025 squads or development programs.

== Retained players ==
Abu Dhabi Knight Riders	Desert Vipers	Dubai Capitals	Gulf Giants	MI Emirates	Sharjah Warriors
Andre Russell; Alishan Sharafu; Charith Asalanka; Phil Salt; Sunil Narine	Dan Lawrence; David Payne; Lockie Ferguson; Max Holden; Sam Curran; Wanindu Hasaranga	Dasun Shanaka; Dushmantha Chameera; Gulbadin Naib; Rovman Powell; Shai Hope	Aayan Afzal Khan; Blessing Muzarabani; Gerhard Erasmus; Mark Adair; James Vince	Allah Ghazanfar; Fazalhaq Farooqi; Kusal Perera; Romario Shepherd; Tom Banton; Muhammad Waseem	Johnson Charles; Kusal Mendis; Tom Kohler-Cadmore; Tim Southee

== Pre-signed players ==
Abu Dhabi Knight Riders	Desert Vipers	Dubai Capitals	Gulf Giants	MI Emirates	Sharjah Warriors
Alex Hales; Liam Livingstone; Sherfane Rutherford	Andries Gous	Luke Wood; Waqar Salamkheil; Muhammad Jawadullah	Azmatullah Omarzai; Rahmanullah Gurbaz; Moeen Ali	Chris Woakes; Kamindu Mendis	Sikandar Raza; Maheesh Theekshana; Saurabh Netravalkar; Tim David; Dinesh Karthik

== Auction results ==
Name	National team	Playing role	Price (in US$)	Team	Notes
Vriitya Aravind	United Arab Emirates	Wicket keeper	10,000	Desert Vipers	
Asif Khan	United Arab Emirates	Batsman	26,000	Gulf Giants	
Muhammad Rohid	United Arab Emirates	Fast bowler	140,000	MI Emirates	RTM from Sharjah Warriorz
Zuhaib Zubair	United Arab Emirates	Spin bowler	10,000	Gulf Giants	RTM from Dubai Capitals
Muhammad Farooq	United Arab Emirates	All-rounder	10,000	Dubai Capitals	
Junaid Siddique	United Arab Emirates	Fast bowler	170,000	Sharjah Warriorz	RTM from Gulf Giants
Fakhar Zaman	Pakistan	Batsman	80,000	Desert Vipers	
James Rew	England	Wicket keeper	10,000	Sharjah Warriorz	
Jordan Thompson	England	All-rounder	48,000	MI Emirates	
Tymal Mills	England	Fast bowler	80,000	Dubai Capitals	
Nathan Sowter	England	Spin bowler	100,000	Sharjah Warriorz	
Naveen-ul-Haq	Afghanistan	Fast bowler	100,000	MI Emirates	
Sean Dickson	England	Batsman	10,000	Gulf Giants	
Andre Fletcher	West Indies	Batsman	260,000	MI Emirates	
Michael Pepper	England	Wicket keeper	40,000	Abu Dhabi Knight Riders	
Scott Currie	England	All-rounder	250,000	Dubai Capitals	
Dwaine Pretorius	South Africa	All-rounder	120,000	Sharjah Warriorz	
George Garton	England	All-rounder	10,000	Abu Dhabi Knight Riders	
Tabraiz Shamsi	South Africa	Spin bowler	40,000	Gulf Giants	
Naseem Shah	Pakistan	Fast bowler	80,000	Desert Vipers	
Jayden Seales	West Indies	Fast bowler	80,000	Sharjah Warriorz	
Qais Ahmed	Afghanistan	Spin bowler	40,000	Desert Vipers	
Liam Dawson	England	All-rounder	170,000	Gulf Giants	
Mohammad Nabi	Afghanistan	All-rounder	80,000	Dubai Capitals	
Brandon McMullen	Scotland	All-rounder	110,000	Abu Dhabi Knight Riders	
Nosthush Kenjige	United States	Spin bowler	10,000	MI Emirates	
Harmeet Singh	United States	All-rounder	10,000	Sharjah Warriorz	
Fred Klaassen	Netherlands	Fast bowler	40,000	Gulf Giants	
Farhan Khan	United Arab Emirates	Fast bowler	10,000	Dubai Capitals	
Haider Razzaq	United Arab Emirates	Fast bowler	50,000	Gulf Giants	
Sanjay Pahal	United Arab Emirates	Fast bowler	10,000	Desert Vipers	
Ibrar Ahmad	United Arab Emirates	Fast bowler	22,000	Abu Dhabi Knight Riders	
Wasim Akram	United Arab Emirates	Fast bowler	55,000	Sharjah Warriorz	
Ajay Kumar	United Arab Emirates	Fast bowler	10,000	Abu Dhabi Knight Riders	
Adnan Idrees	Kuwait	All-rounder	10,000	Abu Dhabi Knight Riders	
Meet Bhavsar	Kuwait	Batsman	14,000	Gulf Giants	
Anudeep Chenthamara	Kuwait	Fast bowler	10,000	Dubai Capitals	
Mohamed Shafeeq	Kuwait	Fast bowler	10,000	MI Emirates	
Mohammed Aslam	Kuwait	All-rounder	14,000	Sharjah Warriorz	
Bilal Tahir	Kuwait	Batsman	10,000	Desert Vipers	
Faisal Khan	Saudi Arabia	Batsman	10,000	Desert Vipers	
Abdul Manan Ali	Saudi Arabia	Batsman	10,000	Abu Dhabi Knight Riders	
Zain Ul Abidin	Saudi Arabia	Spin bowler	10,000	MI Emirates	
Ishtiaq Ahmad	Saudi Arabia	Fast bowler	16,000	Gulf Giants	
Usman Najeeb	Saudi Arabia	Fast bowler	10,000	Dubai Capitals	
Raees Ahmad Ayan	United Arab Emirates	All-rounder	10,000	Sharjah Warriorz	
Usman Khan Shinwari	Afghanistan	Batsman	10,000	MI Emirates	
Ritesh Grandhi	United Arab Emirates	All-rounder	10,000	Dubai Capitals	
Hassan Nawaz	Pakistan	Batsman	40,000	Desert Vipers	
Lorcan Tucker	Ireland	Wicket keeper	10,000	Gulf Giants	
Chris Wood	England	Fast bowler	40,000	Gulf Giants	
Ackeem Auguste	West Indies	Batsman	10,000	MI Emirates	
Tom Moores	England	Wicket keeper	40,000	Gulf Giants	
Richard Ngarava	Zimbabwe	Fast bowler	10,000	Sharjah Warriorz	
Ramon Simmonds	West Indies	Fast bowler	40,000	Gulf Giants	
Arab Gul	Afghanistan	Spin bowler	10,000	MI Emirates	
Tom Bruce	Scotland	Batsman	80,000	Desert Vipers	
Tajinder Dhillon	United States	All-rounder	10,000	MI Emirates	
Shayan Jahangir	United States	Batsman	10,000	Dubai Capitals	
Shubham Ranjane	United States	All-rounder	10,000	Sharjah Warriorz	
Rushil Ugarkar	United States	Fast bowler	10,000	Dubai Capitals	
Ethan D'Souza	United Arab Emirates	Batsman	10,000	Sharjah Warriorz	
Matiullah Khan	United Arab Emirates	Fast bowler	10,000	Desert Vipers	
Zahoor Khan	United Arab Emirates	Fast bowler	10,000	MI Emirates	
Naveen Bidaisee	West Indies	All-rounder	10,000	Dubai Capitals	
Toby Albert	England	Batsman	10,000	Dubai Capitals	
Shakib Al Hasan	Bangladesh	All-rounder	40,000	MI Emirates	
Taskin Ahmed	Bangladesh	Fast bowler	80,000	Sharjah Warriorz	
Tawanda Muyeye	England	Fast bowler	40,000	Desert Vipers	
Mayank Chowdary	United Arab Emirates	Wicket keeper	10,000	Abu Dhabi Knight Riders	
Akshay Wakhare	India	Spin bowler	10,000	Dubai Capitals	
Khary Pierre	West Indies	All-rounder	10,000	Abu Dhabi Knight Riders	
Faridoon Dawoodzai	Afghanistan	Fast bowler	10,000	Desert Vipers	
Shadley van Schalkwyk	United States	All-rounder	10,000	Abu Dhabi Knight Riders	
Unmukt Chand	United States	Wicket keeper	40,000	Abu Dhabi Knight Riders	
Abdul Salam Khan	Saudi Arabia	Spin bowler	10,000	Sharjah Warriorz	

== Wildcard picks ==
Abu Dhabi Knight Riders	Desert Vipers	Dubai Capitals	Gulf Giants	Sharjah Warriors
Piyush Chawla; Olly Stone	Shimron Hetmyer	David Willey; Leus du Plooy	Kyle Mayers; Matthew Forde	Tom Abell; Adil Rashid

== Auction Signings ==
Abu Dhabi Knight Riders	Desert Vipers	Dubai Capitals	Gulf Giants	MI Emirates	Sharjah Warriors
Michael Pepper; George Garton; Brandon McMullen; Ibrar Ahmed; Ajay Kumar; Adnan Idrees; Abdul Manan Ali; Mayank Chowdary; Khary Pierre; Shadley van Schalkwyk; Unmukt Chand	Vriitya Aravind; Fakhar Zaman; Naseem Shah; Qais Ahmad; Sanjay Pahal; Bilal Tahir; Faisal Khan; Hassan Nawaz; Tom Bruce; Matiullah Khan; Tawanda Muyeye; Faridoon Dawoodzai	Muhammad Farooq; Tymal Mills; Scott Currie; Mohammad Nabi; Farhan Khan; Anudeep Chenthamara; Usman Najeeb; Ritesh Grandhi; Shayan Jahangir; Rushil Ugarkar; Naveen Bidiasee; Toby Albert; Akshay Wakhare	Asif Khan; Zuhaib Zubair; Sean Dickson; Tabraiz Shamsi; Liam Dawson; Fred Klaassen; Haider Razzaq; Meet Bhavsar; Ishtiaq Ahmad; Lorcan Tucker; Chris Wood; Tom Moores; Ramon Simmonds	Muhammad Rohid; Jordan Thompson; Naveen-ul-Haq; Andre Fletcher; Nosthush Kenjige; Mohamed Shafeeq; Zain Ul Abidin; Usman Khan; Ackeem Auguste; Arab Gul; Tajinder Dhillon; Zahoor Khan; Shakib Al Hasan	Junaid Siddique; James Rew; Nathan Sowter; Dwaine Pretorius; Jayden Seales; Harmeet Singh; Wasim Akram; Mohamed Nawfer Mohamed Aslam; Raees Ahmad; Richard Ngarava; Shubham Ranjane; Ethan D'Souza; Taskin Ahmed; Abdul Salman Khan
