= 2024 Abu Dhabi Knight Riders season =

2024 International League T20 cricket team

Abu Dhabi Knight Riders in 2024
2024 season
- Coach: Bharat Arun
- Captain: Sunil Narine
- Ground(s): Sheikh Zayed Cricket Stadium, Abu Dhabi

The 2024 edition is the second season for the International League T20 franchise Abu Dhabi Knight Riders. They are one of the six teams competing in the 2024 International League T20.

== Squad ==
No.	Name	Nationality	Birth date	Batting style	Bowling style
Batters
48	Sam Hain	England	16 July 1995 (age 31)	Right-handed	Right-arm off break
	Alishan Sharafu	United Arab Emirates	10 January 2003 (age 23)	Right-handed	Right-arm medium
32	Laurie Evans	England	12 October 1987 (age 38)	Right-handed	Right-arm off break
Wicket-Keepers
19	Michael Pepper	England	25 June 1998 (age 28)	Right-handed	—
33	Joe Clarke	England	26 May 1996 (age 30)	Right-handed	—
	Andries Gous	United States	24 November 1993 (age 32)	Right-handed	—
All-rounders
74	Sunil Narine(c)	West Indies	26 May 1988 (age 38)	Left-handed	Right-arm off break
	Charith Asalanka	Sri Lanka	29 June 1997 (age 29)	Left-handed	Right-arm off break
	Ravi Bopara	England	4 May 1985 (age 41)	Right-handed	Right-arm medium
12	Andre Russell	(Jamaica)	29 April 1988 (age 38)	Right-handed	Right-arm fast-medium
15	David Willey	England	28 February 1990 (age 36)	Left-handed	Left-arm fast-medium
	Brandon McMullen	Scotland	18 October 1999 (age 26)	Right-handed	Right-arm medium
9	Imad Wasim	Pakistan	18 December 1988 (age 37)	Left-handed	Slow left-arm orthodox
Bowlers
82	Josh Little	Ireland	1 November 1999 (age 26)	Right-handed	Left-arm fast-medium
	Ali Khan	United States	13 December 1990 (age 35)	Right-handed	Right-arm fast-medium

== Points table ==
Pos	Team	Pld	W	L	NR	Pts	NRR	Qualification
1	MI Emirates (C)	10	6	4	0	12	1.469	Advance to Qualifier 1
2	Gulf Giants	10	6	4	0	12	0.386	Advance to Qualifier 1
3	Abu Dhabi Knight Riders	10	5	5	0	10	−0.084	Advance to Eliminator
4	Dubai Capitals (R)	10	5	5	0	10	−0.203	Advance to Eliminator
5	Desert Vipers	10	4	6	0	8	−0.010	
6	Sharjah Warriors	10	4	6	0	8	−1.608	

Source: ESPNcricinfo
(C) Champions; (R) Runners-up

== Fixtures ==
=== League stage ===
Match 3
21 January 2024
14:30 (D/N)
Scorecard

Desert Vipers; 164/8 (20 overs)	v	Abu Dhabi Knight Riders; 166/4 (17.4 overs)
Adam Hose 45 (30); Ali Khan 3/29 (4 overs)		Andries Gous 95* (50); Tymal Mills 2/21 (3.4 overs)

Abu Dhabi Knight Riders won by 6 wickets
Dubai International Cricket Stadium, Dubai
Umpires: Aleem Dar (Pak) and Aasif Iqbal (UAE)
Player of the match: Andries Gous (Abu Dhabi Knight Riders)

- Abu Dhabi Knight Riders won the toss and elected to field.
- Matiullah Khan (Abu Dhabi Knight Riders) made his T20 debut.

Match 6
23 January 2024
18:30 (N)
Scorecard

Abu Dhabi Knight Riders; 95 (14.1 overs)	v	MI Emirates; 96/1 (8.1 overs)
Andre Russell 48 (25); Trent Boult 3/14 (4 overs)		Nicholas Pooran 39* (16); Matiullah Khan 1/17 (1.1 overs)

MI Emirates won by 9 wickets
Sheikh Zayed Cricket Stadium, Abu Dhabi
Umpires: Martin Saggers (Eng) and Rod Tucker (Aus)
Player of the match: Trent Boult (MI Emirates)

- MI Emirates won the toss and elected to field.

Match 8
25 January 2024
18:30 (N)
Scorecard

Abu Dhabi Knight Riders; 183/4 (20 overs)	v	Dubai Capitals; 185/5 (16.1 overs)
Sam Hain 77 (49); Dushmantha Chameera 2/35 (4 overs)		Sam Billings 67 (35); Sunil Narine 2/23 (4 overs)

Dubai Capitals won by 5 wickets
Dubai International Cricket Stadium, Dubai
Umpires: Aleem Dar (Pak) and Aasif Iqbal (UAE)
Player of the match: Sam Billings (Dubai Capitals)

- Dubai Capitals won the toss and elected to field.

Match 10
27 January 2024
14:30 (D/N)
Scorecard

Desert Vipers; 154/8 (20 overs)	v	Abu Dhabi Knight Riders; 160/4 (17.2 overs)
Colin Munro 50 (44); Imad Wasim 2/19 (4 overs)		Alishan Sharafu 82* (47); Wanindu Hasaranga 2/12 (4 overs)

Abu Dhabi Knight Riders won by 6 wickets
Sheikh Zayed Cricket Stadium, Abu Dhabi
Umpires: Aleem Dar (Pak) and Aasif Iqbal (UAE)
Player of the match: Alishan Sharafu (Abu Dhabi Knight Riders)

- Abu Dhabi Knight Riders won the toss and elected to field.

Match 12
28 January 2024
14:30 (D/N)
Scorecard

Abu Dhabi Knight Riders; 188/5 (20 overs)	v	MI Emirates; 189/2 (19 overs)
Sam Hain 40 (31); Fazalhaq Farooqi 3/35 (4 overs)		Muhammad Waseem 89* (62); Ali Khan 1/26 (3 overs)

MI Emirates won by 8 wickets
Sheikh Zayed Cricket Stadium, Abu Dhabi
Umpires: Aleem Dar (Pak) and Ruchira Palliyaguruge (SL)
Player of the match: Muhammad Waseem (MI Emirates)

- MI Emirates won the toss and elected to field.

Match 16
31 January 2024
18:30 (N)
Scorecard

Gulf Giants; 161/6 (20 overs)	v	Abu Dhabi Knight Riders; 164/4 (18.2 overs)
Chris Lynn 67 (48); Imad Wasim 2/31 (4 overs)		Michael Pepper 59 (40); Mujeeb Ur Rahman 2/31 (3.2 overs)

Abu Dhabi Knight Riders won by 6 wickets
Sheikh Zayed Cricket Stadium, Abu Dhabi
Umpires: Martin Saggers (Eng) and Rod Tucker (Aus)
Player of the match: Michael Pepper (Abu Dhabi Knight Riders)

- Abu Dhabi Knight Riders won the toss and elected to field.
- Sagar Kalyan (Abu Dhabi Knight Riders) made his T20 debut.

Match 20
3 February 2024
18:30 (N)
Scorecard

Abu Dhabi Knight Riders; 183 (20 overs)	v	Dubai Capitals; 154/8 (20 overs)
Andre Russell 41 (16); Dushmantha Chameera 2/20 (4 overs)		Jason Holder 42 (21); Sunil Narine 2/22 (3 overs)

Abu Dhabi Knight Riders won by 29 runs
Sheikh Zayed Cricket Stadium, Abu Dhabi
Umpires: Shiju Sam (UAE) and Rod Tucker (Aus)
Player of the match: David Willey (Abu Dhabi Knight Riders)

- Dubai Capitals won the toss and elected to field.

Match 23
5 February 2024
18:30 (N)
Scorecard

Sharjah Warriors; 75 (17 overs)	v	Abu Dhabi Knight Riders; 79/3 (10.1 overs)
Daniel Sams 24 (19); Ravi Bopara 4/15 (4 overs)		Joe Clarke 34 (25); Muhammad Jawadullah 3/5 (2 overs)

Abu Dhabi Knight Riders won by 7 wickets
Sharjah Cricket Stadium, Sharjah
Umpires: Akbar Ali (UAE) and Ruchira Palliyaguruge (SL)
Player of the match: Josh Little (Abu Dhabi Knight Riders)

- Abu Dhabi Knight Riders won the toss and elected to field.

Match 25
7 February 2024
18:30 (N)
Scorecard

Abu Dhabi Knight Riders; 94 (17.1 overs)	v	Sharjah Warriors; 95/3 (13.5 overs)
Michael Pepper 32 (21); Adil Rashid 4/12 (4 overs)		Liam Livingstone 30 (13); Imad Wasim 2/20 (4 overs)

Sharjah Warriors won by 7 wickets
Sheikh Zayed Cricket Stadium, Abu Dhabi
Umpires: Aleem Dar (Pak) and Ruchira Palliyaguruge (SL)
Player of the match: Adil Rashid (Sharjah Warriors)

- Sharjah Warriors won the toss and elected to field.

Match 28
10 February 2024
14:30 (D/N)
Scorecard

Gulf Giants; 166/3 (20 overs)	v	Abu Dhabi Knight Riders; 163/9 (20 overs)
Jordan Cox 57 (38); Ali Khan 2/39 (4 overs)		Jason Roy 47 (31); Jamie Overton 3/32 (4 overs)

Gulf Giants won by 3 runs
Dubai International Cricket Stadium, Dubai
Umpires: Adrian Holdstock (SA) and Martin Saggers (Eng)
Player of the match: Jamie Overton (Gulf Giants)

- Gulf Giants won the toss and elected to bat.

=== Playoffs ===
==== Eliminator ====
Match 31
13 February 2024
18:30 (N)
Scorecard

Dubai Capitals; 188/5 (20 overs)	v	Abu Dhabi Knight Riders; 103 (16.5 overs)
Sam Billings 46* (26); Sabir Ali 2/35 (3 overs)		David Willey 36 (27); Scott Kuggeleijn 4/17 (3.5 overs)

Dubai Capitals won by 85 runs
Sheikh Zayed Cricket Stadium, Abu Dhabi
Umpires: Aleem Dar (Pak) and Ruchira Palliyaguruge (SL)
Player of the match: Sikandar Raza (Dubai Capitals)

- Abu Dhabi Knight Riders won the toss and elected to field.
