= 2026 International League T20 =

Fifth season of ILT20

- Dates: 21 November – 20 December 2026
- Administrator: Emirates Cricket Board
- Cricket format: Twenty20
- Tournament format(s): Double round-robin and playoffs
- Host: United Arab Emirates
- Participants: 6
- Matches: 34
- Official website: ilt20.ae

The 2026 International League T20, also known as DP World ILT20 Season 5, for sponsorship reasons, is the fifth season of the International League T20, a professional Twenty20 cricket league in the United Arab Emirates. The tournament is scheduled to be held from 21 November to 20 December 2026.

The Desert Vipers are the defending champions, having won their maiden title in the previous season by defeating MI Emirates in the final.

== Background ==
On 13 April 2026, the Emirates Cricket Board confirmed the window for the fifth season. To avoid overlapping with other global T20 leagues like the SA20, the tournament was moved forward to a November–December window, continuing the trend of shifting away from the original January–February slot used in the first three editions.

The player auction was held in Jumeirah, Dubai on 1 October 2026.

== Teams ==
The tournament features the same six franchises from the previous editions.

Team	Captain	Head coach
Abu Dhabi Knight Riders	Jason Holder	Dwayne Bravo
Desert Vipers	Shadab Khan	James Foster
Dubai Capitals	Sam Billings	Hemang Badani
Gulf Giants	Heinrich Klaasen	Simon Helmot
MI Emirates	Kieron Pollard	Mark Boucher
Sharjah Warriorz	Sikandar Raza	Adrian Birrell

== Squads ==
Retained players were announced on 11 August 2026. The player auction took place on 1 October 2026. On November wild card picks announced.

Abu Dhabi Knight Riders	Desert Vipers	Dubai Capitals	Gulf Giants	MI Emirates	Sharjah Warriorz
Jason Holder (c); Finn Allen; Kane Williamson; Sunil Narine; Moeen Ali; Andre Fletcher; Colin Munro; Qais Ahmad; Lorcan Tucker; Usman Tariq; Michael Pepper; Matthew Tromp; Gulbadin Naib; Amshi de Silva; Jakeem Pollard; Muhammad Rohid; Alishan Sharafu; Arab Gul; Abdullah Tarakhail; Ravija Sandaruwan	Shadab Khan (c); Joe Clarke; Andries Gous; Shimron Hetmyer; Harry Tector; Dan Lawrence; Mujeeb Ur Rahman; Babar Azam; Naseem Shah; Fakhar Zaman; David Payne; Aneurin Donald; Khuzaima Tanveer; Vriitya Aravind; Nilansh Keswani; Nangeyalia Kharote; Saleem Safi; Abdullah Ahmadzai; Bilal Tahir; Sanjay Pahal; Wali Muhammad; Ishtiaq Ahmed	Sam Billings (c); Faf du Plessis; Phil Salt; Marcus Stoinis; Dasun Shanaka; Rovman Powell; Max Holden; Tom Moores; Luke Wood; Matthew Potts; Mark Adair; Mustafizur Rahman; Noor Ahmad; Darwish Rasooli; Sediqullah Atal; Karim Janat; Hassan Khan; Zuhaib Zubair; Aayan Afzal Khan; Haider Ali; Masood ul Rahman Gurbaz; Anudeep Chenthamara; Usman Najeeb	Heinrich Klaasen (c); David Miller; Jos Buttler; Liam Livingstone; Curtis Campher; Rahmanullah Gurbaz; Ibrahim Zadran; Azmatullah Omarzai; David Wiese; Alzarri Joseph; Shamar Joseph; Tabraiz Shamsi; Blessing Muzarabani; Matiullah Khan; Dhruv Parashar; Imran Mir; Shubham Ranjane; Meet Bhavsar; Haider Rarraq; Alick Athanaze; Sagar Kalyan; Awais Ahmad; Wahidullah Zadran	Nicholas Pooran (c); Jonny Bairstow; James Coles; Rashid Khan; Kieron Pollard; Romario Shepherd; Sherfane Rutherford; Muhammad Waseem; Jordon Thompson; Ross Adair; Kusal Perera; Asa Tribe; Chris Jordan; Lizaad Williams; Fazalhaq Farooqi; Allah Ghazanfar; Zahoor Khan; Wasim Akram; Faridoon Dawoodzai; Sanjay Krishnamurthi; Raizal Nadir Nather Shah; Zain ul Abidin; Mohammad Shafeeq	James Vince (c); Tom Banton; Adam Milne; Logan van Beek; George Dockrell; Richard Gleeson; George Linde; Brandon McMullen; Mohammad Nabi; Craig Overton; Sikandar Raza; Adil Rashid; James Rew; Paul Walter; Fareed Malik; Waqar Salamkheil; Tanish Suri; Junaid Siddique; Ali Aamer Naseer; Sarafuddin Ashraf; Arunraj Selvaraj; Mohammad Saqib

== Venues ==

United Arab Emirates
Dubai	Sharjah	Abu Dhabi
Dubai International Cricket Stadium	Sharjah Cricket Stadium	Sheikh Zayed Cricket Stadium
Capacity: 25,000	Capacity: 16,000	Capacity: 20,000

== Match officials ==
On 12 November 2026, the ILT20 released the list of match referees and umpires for the tournament.

=== Match referees ===
- Simon Taufel
- Roshan Mahanama

=== Umpires ===
- Akbar Ali
- Chris Brown
- Adrian Holdstock
- Richard Illingworth
- Aasif Iqbal
- Wayne Knights
- Ahmed Shah Pakteen
- Leslie Reifer
- Martin Saggers
- Shiju Sam
- Paul Wilson

== Standings ==
=== Points table ===
Pos	Team	Pld	W	L	NR	Pts	NRR
1	Abu Dhabi Knight Riders	1	1	0	0	2	2.750
2	MI Emirates	1	1	0	0	2	2.600
3	Gulf Giants	1	1	0	0	2	0.350
4	Sharjah Warriorz	1	0	1	0	0	−0.350
5	Desert Vipers	1	0	1	0	0	−2.600
6	Dubai Capitals	1	0	1	0	0	−2.750

Updated to match(es) played on 22 November 2026. Source: Cricinfo

=== Match summary ===
Team	Group matches										Playoffs		
Team	1	2	3	4	5	6	7	8	9	10	Q1/E	Q2	F
Abu Dhabi Knight Riders	2	?	?	?	?	?	?	?	?	?			
Desert Vipers	0	?	?	?	?	?	?	?	?	?			
Dubai Capitals	0	?	?	?	?	?	?	?	?	?			
Gulf Giants	2	?	?	?	?	?	?	?	?	?			
MI Emirates	2	?	?	?	?	?	?	?	?	?			
Sharjah Warriorz	0	?	?	?	?	?	?	?	?	?			

Win	Loss	No result

- Note: The total points at the end of each group match are listed.
- Note: Click on the points (group matches) or W/L (playoffs) to see the match summary.

Visitor team →	ADKR	DV	DC	GG	MIE	SW
Home team ↓	ADKR	DV	DC	GG	MIE	SW
Abu Dhabi Knight Riders		Match 15	Match 30	Match 19	Match 13	Match 11
Desert Vipers	Match 27		Match 21	Match 12	Emirates; 52 runs	Match 18
Dubai Capitals	Abu Dhabi; 55 runs	Match 6		Match 10	Match 16	Match 23
Gulf Giants	Match 17	Match 29	Match 25		Match 5	Match 14
MI Emirates	Match 7	Match 9	Match 28	Match 22		Match 20
Sharjah Warriorz	Match 24	Match 4	Match 8	Giants; 7 runs	Match 26	

Visitor team won

- Note: Results listed are according to the home (horizontal) and visitor (vertical) teams.
- Note: Click on a result to see a summary of the match.

== League stage ==
The full fixture list was released on 7 October 2026.

Match 1
21 November 2026
18:30 (N)
Scorecard

MI Emirates; 174/8 (20 overs)	v	Desert Vipers; 122 (19.1 overs)
Kusal Perera 58 (40); Naseem Shah 2/24 (4 overs)		Joe Clarke 35 (28); Chris Jordan 4/19 (3 overs)

MI Emirates won by 52 runs
Dubai International Cricket Stadium, Dubai
Umpires: Chris Brown (NZ) and Martin Saggers (Eng)
Player of the match: Kusal Perera (MI Emirates)

- Desert Vipers won the toss and elected to field.

Match 2
22 November 2026
14:00
Scorecard

Gulf Giants; 168/8 (20 overs)	v	Sharjah Warriorz; 161/7 (20 overs)
Ibrahim Zadran 84 (53); Junaid Siddique 2/30 (4 overs)		Paul Walter 40 (24); David Wiese 2/16 (4 overs)

Gulf Giants won by 7 runs
Sharjah Cricket Stadium, Sharjah
Umpires: Martin Saggers (Eng) and Shiju Sam (UAE)
Player of the match: Ibrahim Zadran (Gulf Giants)

- Sharjah Warriorz won the toss and elected to field.

Match 3
22 November 2026
18:30 (N)
Scorecard

Abu Dhabi Knight Riders; 167/6 (20 overs)	v	Dubai Capitals; 112 (17.5 overs)
Finn Allen 74 (38); Karim Janat 2/8 (1 over)		Marcus Stoinis 47 (32); Usman Tariq 4/27 (4 overs)

Abu Dhabi Knight Riders won by 55 runs
Dubai International Cricket Stadium, Dubai
Umpires: Akbar Ali (UAE) and Wayne Knights (NZ)
Player of the match: Finn Allen (Abu Dhabi Knight Riders)

- Abu Dhabi Knight Riders won the toss and elected to bat.

Match 4
23 November 2026
18:30 (N)
Scorecard

Sharjah Warriorz	v	Desert Vipers

Sharjah Cricket Stadium, Sharjah

Match 5
24 November 2026
18:30 (N)
Scorecard

Gulf Giants	v	MI Emirates

Dubai International Cricket Stadium, Dubai

Match 6
25 November 2026
18:30 (N)
Scorecard

Dubai Capitals	v	Desert Vipers

Dubai International Cricket Stadium, Dubai

Match 7
26 November 2026
18:30 (N)
Scorecard

Abu Dhabi Knight Riders	v	MI Emirates

Sharjah Cricket Stadium, Sharjah

Match 8
27 November 2026
18:30 (N)
Scorecard

Sharjah Warriorz	v	Dubai Capitals

Dubai International Cricket Stadium, Dubai

Match 9
28 November 2026
14:00
Scorecard

Desert Vipers	v	MI Emirates

Sharjah Cricket Stadium, Sharjah

Match 10
28 November 2026
18:30 (N)
Scorecard

Dubai Capitals	v	Gulf Giants

Dubai International Cricket Stadium, Dubai

Match 11
29 November 2026
14:00
Scorecard

Abu Dhabi Knight Riders	v	Sharjah Warriorz

Dubai International Cricket Stadium, Dubai

Match 12
29 November 2026
18:30 (N)
Scorecard

Desert Vipers	v	Gulf Giants

Sharjah Cricket Stadium, Sharjah

Match 13
30 November 2026
18:30 (N)
Scorecard

Abu Dhabi Knight Riders	v	MI Emirates

Dubai International Cricket Stadium, Dubai

Match 14
1 December 2026
18:30 (N)
Scorecard

Sharjah Warriorz	v	Gulf Giants

Sharjah Cricket Stadium, Sharjah

Match 15
2 December 2026
14:00
Scorecard

Abu Dhabi Knight Riders	v	Desert Vipers

Dubai International Cricket Stadium, Dubai

Match 16
2 December 2026
18:30 (N)
Scorecard

Dubai Capitals	v	MI Emirates

Dubai International Cricket Stadium, Dubai

Match 17
3 December 2026
18:30 (N)
Scorecard

Gulf Giants	v	Abu Dhabi Knight Riders

Sharjah Cricket Stadium, Sharjah

Match 18
4 December 2026
18:30 (N)
Scorecard

Sharjah Warriorz	v	Desert Vipers

Dubai International Cricket Stadium, Dubai

Match 19
5 December 2026
18:30 (N)
Scorecard

Abu Dhabi Knight Riders	v	Gulf Giants

Sharjah Cricket Stadium, Sharjah

Match 20
6 December 2026
14:00
Scorecard

MI Emirates	v	Sharjah Warriorz

Dubai International Cricket Stadium, Dubai

Match 21
6 December 2026
18:30 (N)
Scorecard

Dubai Capitals	v	Desert Vipers

Dubai International Cricket Stadium, Dubai

Match 22
7 December 2026
18:30 (N)
Scorecard

Gulf Giants	v	MI Emirates

Sharjah Cricket Stadium, Sharjah

Match 23
8 December 2026
18:30 (N)
Scorecard

Dubai Capitals	v	Sharjah Warriorz

Dubai International Cricket Stadium, Dubai

Match 24
9 December 2026
18:30 (N)
Scorecard

Sharjah Warriorz	v	Abu Dhabi Knight Riders

Sharjah Cricket Stadium, Sharjah

Match 25
10 December 2026
18:30 (N)
Scorecard

Dubai Capitals	v	Gulf Giants

Dubai International Cricket Stadium, Dubai

Match 26
11 December 2026
18:30 (N)
Scorecard

Sharjah Warriorz	v	MI Emirates

Dubai International Cricket Stadium, Dubai

Match 27
12 December 2026
18:30 (N)
Scorecard

Abu Dhabi Knight Riders	v	Desert Vipers

Sharjah Cricket Stadium, Sharjah

Match 28
13 December 2026
14:00
Scorecard

Dubai Capitals	v	MI Emirates

Dubai International Cricket Stadium, Dubai

Match 29
13 December 2026
18:30 (N)
Scorecard

Desert Vipers	v	Gulf Giants

Sharjah Cricket Stadium, Sharjah

Match 30
14 December 2026
18:30 (N)
Scorecard

Abu Dhabi Knight Riders	v	Dubai Capitals

Dubai International Cricket Stadium, Dubai

== Playoffs ==
=== Bracket ===
Qualifier 1
16 December 2026 — Abu Dhabi
1
2
Eliminator
17 December 2026 — Dubai
3
4

Qualifier 2
18 December 2026 — Sharjah
Q1L
EW

Final
20 December 2026 — Dubai
Q1W
Q2W
