= 2026 Gulf Giants season =

Cricket league season

Gulf Giants
2026 season
- Coach: Simon Helmot
- Captain(s): Heinrich Klaasen
- Home ground: Dubai International Cricket Stadium, Dubai
- League: International League T20
- League Stage: –
- Playoffs: –

The 2026 Gulf Giants season is the fifth season of the franchise in the International League T20. The team is captained by Heinrich Klaasen and coached by Simon Helmot.

Ahead of the 2024 season, previous head coach Jonathan Trott resigned and Simon Helmot was appointed as the new head coach. James Vince who had captained the team in 2025, was not retained for the 2026 season. with Heinrich Klaasen appointed as the new captain.

== Current squads ==
Retained players were announced on 11 August 2026. The player auction took place on 1 October 2026. On 16 November wild card picks announced.

Gulf Giants 2026
No.	Name	Nationality	Birth date	Batting style	Bowling style	Year signed	Notes
Batters
10	David Miller	South Africa	10 June 1989 (age 37)	Left-handed	Right-arm off break	2026	
Wicket-keepers					Right-arm off break		
45	Heinrich Klaasen	South Africa	30 July 1991 (age 35)	Right-handed	Right-arm off break	Right-arm off break	2026
63	Jos Buttler	England	8 September 1990 (age 36)	Right-handed	Right-arm off break	—	2026
All-rounders					Right-arm off break		
9	Azmatullah Omarzai	Afghanistan	24 March 2000 (age 26)	Right-handed	Right-arm off break	Right-arm medium-fast	2026
Bowlers					Right-arm off break		
40	Blessing Muzarabani	Zimbabwe	2 October 1996 (age 30)	Right-handed	Right-arm fast medium	2026	

== Standings ==
=== Points table ===
Pos	Team	Pld	W	L	NR	Pts	NRR
1	Abu Dhabi Knight Riders	0	0	0	0	0	0.000
2	Desert Vipers	0	0	0	0	0	0.000
3	Dubai Capitals	0	0	0	0	0	0.000
4	Gulf Giants	0	0	0	0	0	0.000
5	MI Emirates	0	0	0	0	0	0.000
6	Sharjah Warriorz	0	0	0	0	0	0.000

First match(es) will be played: unknown. Source: ILT20

== Administration and support staff ==
Position	Name
Head coach	Simon Helmot
Batting coach	Michael Klinger
Bowling coach	Shane Bond
Fielding coach	Kadeer Ali
Strength & conditioning coach	Gary Brent
physiotherapist	James Pipe
