= 2024 International League T20 =

Cricket league in the United Arab Emirates

- Dates: 19 January – 17 February
- Administrator: Emirates Cricket Board
- Cricket format: Twenty20
- Tournament format(s): Double round-robin and Playoffs
- Champions: MI Emirates (1st title)
- Runners-up: Dubai Capitals
- Participants: 6
- Matches: 34
- Player of the series: Sikandar Raza (Dubai Capitals)
- Most runs: James Vince (356) (Gulf Giants)
- Most wickets: Fazalhaq Farooqi (17) (MI Emirates); Waqar Salamkheil (17) (MI Emirates)
- Official website: www.ilt20.ae

The 2024 International League T20, also known as DP World ILT20 2024 for sponsorship reasons, was the second season of the International League T20, a professional Twenty20 cricket league in the United Arab Emirates, organised by the Emirates Cricket Board. The tournament was played from 19 January 2024 and the final was held on 17 February 2024. Gulf Giants were the defending champions. The matches were granted List A status by the ICC for fielding less domestic players as stipulated.

In the final, MI Emirates defeated Dubai Capitals by 45 runs to win the title.

== Background ==
The UAE-based ILT20 was given List A status by the ICC shortly before the start of its second season. It is the first T20 league run by the board of an ICC Associate member nation to be given the status.

The tournament was thus recognised as an official T20 tournament, with all tournament statistics given official status. In a statement, the ILT20 called the update "a major milestone" and a "major boost".

== Squads ==
Teams had the option of retaining players from the tournament's first season or acquiring new signings.

Abu Dhabi Knight Riders	Desert Vipers	Dubai Capitals	Gulf Giants	MI Emirates	Sharjah Warriors
Head coaches
(India) Bharat Arun	(United Kingdom) James Foster	(Trinidad and Tobago) Phil Simmons	(Zimbabwe) Andy Flower	(India) Robin Singh	(United Kingdom) Paul Farbrace
Captains
(Trinidad and Tobago) Sunil Narine	(New Zealand) Colin Munro	(Australia) David Warner	(United Kingdom) James Vince	(Trinidad and Tobago) Nicholas Pooran	(United Kingdom) Tom Kohler-Cadmore
Players
(United Kingdom) David Willey; (United Kingdom) Jake Lintott; (United Kingdom) Jason Roy; (United Kingdom) Joe Clarke; (United Kingdom) Laurie Evans; (United Kingdom) Michael Pepper; (United Kingdom) Ravi Bopara; (United Kingdom) Sam Hain; (Ireland) Josh Little; (Jamaica) Brandon King; (Jamaica) Andre Russell; (Pakistan) Abbas Afridi; (Pakistan) Imad Wasim; (United Kingdom) Brandon McMullen; (South Africa) Marchant de Lange; (Sri Lanka) Charith Asalanka; (United Arab Emirates) Treveen Mathew; (United Arab Emirates) Adhitya Shetty; (United Arab Emirates) Alishan Sharafu; (Afghanistan) Matiullah Khan; (United Arab Emirates) Sabir Ali; (United States) Ali Khan	(United Kingdom) Adam Hose; (United Kingdom) Alex Hales; (United Kingdom) Dan Lawrence; (United Kingdom) Luke Wood; (United Kingdom) Nathan Sowter; (United Kingdom) Phil Salt; (United Kingdom) Sam Curran; (United Kingdom) Tom Curran; (United Kingdom) Tymal Mills; (Guyana) Sherfane Rutherford; (Jamaica) Sheldon Cottrell; (Netherlands) Bas de Leede; (Pakistan) Azam Khan; (Pakistan) Mohammad Amir; (Pakistan) Shadab Khan; (Pakistan) Shaheen Afridi; (United Kingdom) Michael Jones; (Sri Lanka) Dinesh Chandimal; (Sri Lanka) Matheesha Pathirana; (Sri Lanka) Wanindu Hasaranga; (United Arab Emirates) Ali Naseer; (United Arab Emirates) Aryan Lakra; (United Arab Emirates) Karthik Meiyappan; (United Arab Emirates) Rohan Mustafa	(Afghanistan) Rahmanullah Gurbaz; (Australia) Andrew Tye; (Australia) Ben Dunk; (Australia) Kane Richardson; (United Kingdom) ~~Joe Root~~; (United Kingdom) Leus du Plooy; (United Kingdom) ~~Mark Wood~~; (United Kingdom) Max Holden; (United Kingdom) Olly Stone; (United Kingdom) Sam Billings; (United Kingdom) Tom Abell; (United Kingdom) Tom Banton; (Jamaica) Rovman Powell; (Netherlands) Roelof van der Merwe; (New Zealand) Scott Kuggeleijn; (Pakistan) Haider Ali; (Pakistan) Mohammad Mohsin; (Sri Lanka) Dasun Shanaka; (Sri Lanka) Dushmantha Chameera; (Sri Lanka) Nuwan Thushara; (Sri Lanka) Sadeera Samarawickrama; (United Arab Emirates) Akif Raja; (India) Rahul Bhatia; (United Arab Emirates) Rahul Chopra; (Zimbabwe) Sikandar Raza	(Afghanistan) Karim Janat; (Afghanistan) Mujeeb Ur Rahman; (Australia) Chris Lynn; (Barbados) Carlos Brathwaite; (Dominica) Dominic Drakes; (United Kingdom) Chris Jordan; (United Kingdom) Jamie Overton; (United Kingdom) Jamie Smith; (United Kingdom) Jordan Cox; (United Kingdom) Richard Gleeson; (Guyana) Shimron Hetmyer; (Namibia) Gerhard Erasmus; (Nepal) Dipendra Singh Airee; (United Arab Emirates) Aayan Afzal Khan; (India) Sanchit Sharma; (United Arab Emirates) Usman Khan; (United Arab Emirates) Zohaib Zubair; (United States) Saurabh Netravalkar; (Zimbabwe) Blessing Muzarabani; (Australia) Daniel Worrall; (United Kingdom) Liam Dawson	(Afghanistan) Fazalhaq Farooqi; (Afghanistan) Waqar Salamkheil; (Australia) Tim David; (United Kingdom) Dan Mousley; (United Kingdom) Jordan Thompson; (United Kingdom) Will Smeed; (Grenada) Andre Fletcher; (India) Ambati Rayudu; (Saint Vincent and the Grenadines) Odean Smith; (New Zealand) Corey Anderson; (New Zealand) Trent Boult; (Pakistan) Mohammad Amir Khan; (Jamaica) McKenny Clarke; (Sri Lanka) Kusal Perera; (Sri Lanka) Vijayakanth Viyaskanth; (Trinidad and Tobago) Akeal Hosein; (Trinidad and Tobago) Dwayne Bravo; (Trinidad and Tobago) Kieron Pollard; (United Arab Emirates) Asif Khan; (United Arab Emirates) Mohammad Rohid Khan; (United Arab Emirates) Muhammad Waseem; (United Arab Emirates) Zahoor Khan; (United States) Nosthush Kenjige	(Afghanistan) Qais Ahmad; (Australia) Daniel Sams; (United Kingdom) Adil Rashid; (United Kingdom) Chris Woakes; (United Kingdom) Joe Denly; (United Kingdom) Lewis Gregory; (United Kingdom) Liam Livingstone; (United Kingdom) James Fuller; (New Zealand) Martin Guptill; (Pakistan) Hunain Shah; (Saint Lucia) Johnson Charles; (United Kingdom) Chris Sole; (United Kingdom) Mark Watt; (Sri Lanka) Dilshan Madushanka; (Sri Lanka) Kusal Mendis; (Sri Lanka) Maheesh Theekshana; (Sri Lanka) Niroshan Dickwella; (Trinidad and Tobago) Mark Deyal; (United Arab Emirates) Basil Hameed; (United Arab Emirates) Junaid Siddique; (United Arab Emirates) Muhammad Jawadullah; (United Arab Emirates) Nilesh Keswani; (Zimbabwe) Sean Williams

== Venues ==

United Arab Emirates
Dubai	Sharjah	Abu Dhabi
Dubai International Cricket Stadium	Sharjah Cricket Stadium	Sheikh Zayed Cricket Stadium
Capacity: 25,000	Capacity: 16,000	Capacity: 20,000

== Points table ==
Pos	Team	Pld	W	L	NR	Pts	NRR	Qualification
1	MI Emirates (C)	10	6	4	0	12	1.469	Advance to Qualifier 1
2	Gulf Giants	10	6	4	0	12	0.386	Advance to Qualifier 1
3	Abu Dhabi Knight Riders	10	5	5	0	10	−0.084	Advance to Eliminator
4	Dubai Capitals (R)	10	5	5	0	10	−0.203	Advance to Eliminator
5	Desert Vipers	10	4	6	0	8	−0.010	
6	Sharjah Warriors	10	4	6	0	8	−1.608	

Source: ESPNcricinfo
(C) Champions; (R) Runners-up

== League stage ==
Match 1
19 January 2024
18:30 (N)
Scorecard

Gulf Giants; 198/7 (20 overs)	v	Sharjah Warriors; 167/7 (20 overs)
James Vince 45 (35); Maheesh Theekshana 4/15 (4 overs)		Johnson Charles 57 (38); Jamie Overton 3/29 (4 overs)

Gulf Giants won by 31 runs
Sharjah Cricket Stadium, Sharjah
Umpires: Aleem Dar (Pak) and Simon Taufel (Aus)
Player of the match: Jamie Overton (Gulf Giants)

- Sharjah Warriors won the toss and elected to field.

Match 2
20 January 2024
18:30 (N)
Scorecard

MI Emirates; 159/9 (20 overs)	v	Dubai Capitals; 160/3 (16 overs)
Muhammad Waseem 51 (26); Sikandar Raza 3/21 (4 overs)		Rahmanullah Gurbaz 81 (39); Trent Boult 2/23 (4 overs)

Dubai Capitals won by 7 wickets
Dubai International Cricket Stadium, Dubai
Umpires: Ruchira Palliyaguruge (SL) and Rod Tucker (Aus)
Player of the match: Sikandar Raza (Dubai Capitals)

- Dubai Capitals won the toss and elected to field.
- Rahul Chopra (Dubai Capitals) made his T20 debut.

Match 3
21 January 2024
14:30 (D/N)
Scorecard

Desert Vipers; 164/8 (20 overs)	v	Abu Dhabi Knight Riders; 166/4 (17.4 overs)
Adam Hose 45 (30); Ali Khan 3/29 (4 overs)		Andries Gous 95* (50); Tymal Mills 2/21 (3.4 overs)

Abu Dhabi Knight Riders won by 6 wickets
Dubai International Cricket Stadium, Dubai
Umpires: Aleem Dar (Pak) and Aasif Iqbal (UAE)
Player of the match: Andries Gous (Abu Dhabi Knight Riders)

- Abu Dhabi Knight Riders won the toss and elected to field.
- Matiullah Khan (Abu Dhabi Knight Riders) made his T20 debut.

Match 4
21 January 2024
18:30 (N)
Scorecard

MI Emirates; 179/5 (20 overs)	v	Gulf Giants; 161/9 (20 overs)
Nicholas Pooran 51 (28); Chris Jordan 2/48 (4 overs)		James Vince 52 (43); Fazalhaq Farooqi 4/25 (4 overs)

MI Emirates won by 18 runs
Sheikh Zayed Cricket Stadium, Abu Dhabi
Umpires: Ahmed Shah Pakteen (Afg) and Martin Saggers (Eng)
Player of the match: Tim David (MI Emirates)

- Gulf Giants won the toss and elected to field.

Match 5
22 January 2024
18:30 (N)
Scorecard

Dubai Capitals; 170/7 (20 overs)	v	Sharjah Warriors; 171/5 (18.5 overs)
Sam Billings 52 (31); Daniel Sams 3/28 (4 overs)		Johnson Charles 93 (51); Dushmantha Chameera 4/28 (4 overs)

Sharjah Warriors won by 5 wickets
Dubai International Cricket Stadium, Dubai
Umpires: Aleem Dar (Pak) and Aasif Iqbal (UAE)
Player of the match: Johnson Charles (Sharjah Warriors)

- Sharjah Warriors won the toss and elected to field.

Match 6
23 January 2024
18:30 (N)
Scorecard

Abu Dhabi Knight Riders; 95 (14.1 overs)	v	MI Emirates; 96/1 (8.1 overs)
Andre Russell 48 (25); Trent Boult 3/14 (4 overs)		Nicholas Pooran 39* (16); Matiullah Khan 1/17 (1.1 overs)

MI Emirates won by 9 wickets
Sheikh Zayed Cricket Stadium, Abu Dhabi
Umpires: Martin Saggers (Eng) and Rod Tucker (Aus)
Player of the match: Trent Boult (MI Emirates)

- MI Emirates won the toss and elected to field.

Match 7
24 January 2024
18:30 (N)
Scorecard

Gulf Giants; 160/6 (20 overs)	v	Desert Vipers; 162/4 (18.4 overs)
Chris Lynn 63 (42); Shaheen Afridi 3/22 (4 overs)		Wanindu Hasaranga 42 (19); Dominic Drakes 2/19 (4 overs)

Desert Vipers won by 6 wickets
Dubai International Cricket Stadium, Dubai
Umpires: Aasif Iqbal (UAE) and Ruchira Palliyaguruge (SL)
Player of the match: Wanindu Hasaranga (Desert Vipers)

- Desert Vipers won the toss and elected to field.

Match 8
25 January 2024
18:30 (N)
Scorecard

Abu Dhabi Knight Riders; 183/4 (20 overs)	v	Dubai Capitals; 185/5 (16.1 overs)
Sam Hain 77 (49); Dushmantha Chameera 2/35 (4 overs)		Sam Billings 67 (35); Sunil Narine 2/23 (4 overs)

Dubai Capitals won by 5 wickets
Dubai International Cricket Stadium, Dubai
Umpires: Aleem Dar (Pak) and Aasif Iqbal (UAE)
Player of the match: Sam Billings (Dubai Capitals)

- Dubai Capitals won the toss and elected to field.

Match 9
26 January 2024
18:30 (N)
Scorecard

MI Emirates; 180/7 (20 overs)	v	Sharjah Warriors; 74 (12.1 overs)
Kusal Perera 42 (25); Muhammad Jawadullah 3/31 (4 overs)		Niroshan Dickwella 22 (13); Akeal Hosein 4/23 (4 overs)

MI Emirates won by 106 runs
Sharjah Cricket Stadium, Sharjah
Umpires: Martin Saggers (Eng) and Rod Tucker (Aus)
Player of the match: Akeal Hosein (MI Emirates)

- Sharjah Warriors won the toss and elected to field.

Match 10
27 January 2024
14:30 (D/N)
Scorecard

Desert Vipers; 154/8 (20 overs)	v	Abu Dhabi Knight Riders; 160/4 (17.2 overs)
Colin Munro 50 (44); Imad Wasim 2/19 (4 overs)		Alishan Sharafu 82* (47); Wanindu Hasaranga 2/12 (4 overs)

Abu Dhabi Knight Riders won by 6 wickets
Sheikh Zayed Cricket Stadium, Abu Dhabi
Umpires: Aleem Dar (Pak) and Aasif Iqbal (UAE)
Player of the match: Alishan Sharafu (Abu Dhabi Knight Riders)

- Abu Dhabi Knight Riders won the toss and elected to field.

Match 11
27 January 2024
18:30 (N)
Scorecard

Dubai Capitals; 132/7 (20 overs)	v	Gulf Giants; 133/7 (18.4 overs)
Sikandar Raza 47 (36); Carlos Brathwaite 3/26 (4 overs)		Jordan Cox 38* (30); Roelof van der Merwe 3/27 (3.4 overs)

Gulf Giants won by 3 wickets
Sharjah Cricket Stadium, Sharjah
Umpires: Martin Saggers (Eng) and Ahmed Shah Pakteen (Afg)
Player of the match: Carlos Brathwaite (Gulf Giants)

- Dubai Capitals won the toss and elected to bat.
- Zuhaib Zubair (Gulf Giants) made his T20 debuts.

Match 12
28 January 2024
14:30 (D/N)
Scorecard

Abu Dhabi Knight Riders; 188/5 (20 overs)	v	MI Emirates; 189/2 (19 overs)
Sam Hain 40 (31); Fazalhaq Farooqi 3/35 (4 overs)		Muhammad Waseem 89* (62); Ali Khan 1/26 (3 overs)

MI Emirates won by 8 wickets
Sheikh Zayed Cricket Stadium, Abu Dhabi
Umpires: Aleem Dar (Pak) and Ruchira Palliyaguruge (SL)
Player of the match: Muhammad Waseem (MI Emirates)

- MI Emirates won the toss and elected to field.

Match 13
28 January 2024
18:30 (N)
Scorecard

Sharjah Warriors; 174/7 (20 overs)	v	Desert Vipers; 167/7 (20 overs)
Tom Kohler-Cadmore 68 (34); Wanindu Hasaranga 3/30 (4 overs)		Alex Hales 61 (40); Chris Woakes 2/26 (4 overs)

Sharjah Warriors won by 7 runs
Sharjah Cricket Stadium, Sharjah
Umpires: Ahmed Shah Pakteen (Afg) and Rod Tucker (Aus)
Player of the match: Tom Kohler-Cadmore (Sharjah Warriors)

- Desert Vipers won the toss and elected to field.

Match 14
29 January 2024
18:30 (N)
Scorecard

Dubai Capitals; 104 (18.2 overs)	v	Sharjah Warriors; 105/1 (13.1 overs)
Sikandar Raza 22 (25); Maheesh Theekshana 4/20 (4 overs)		Johnson Charles 43* (33); Haider Ali 1/21 (4 overs)

Sharjah Warriors won by 9 wickets
Sharjah Cricket Stadium, Sharjah
Umpires: Ahmed Shah Pakteen (Afg) and Martin Saggers (Eng)
Player of the match: Maheesh Theekshana (Sharjah Warriors)

- Dubai Capitals won the toss and elected to bat.
- Haider Ali (Dubai capitals) made his T20 debut.

Match 15
30 January 2024
18:30 (N)
Scorecard

MI Emirates; 149/9 (20 overs)	v	Desert Vipers; 150/8 (20 overs)
Tim David 28 (14); Mohammad Amir 3/26 (4 overs)		Sherfane Rutherford 35 (22); Muhammad Rohid 3/21 (3 overs)

Desert Vipers won by 2 wickets
Dubai Cricket Stadium, Dubai
Umpires: Akbar Ali (UAE) and Ruchira Palliyaguruge (SL)
Player of the match: Mohammad Amir (Desert Vipers)

- Desert Vipers won the toss and elected to field.

Match 16
31 January 2024
18:30 (N)
Scorecard

Gulf Giants; 161/6 (20 overs)	v	Abu Dhabi Knight Riders; 164/4 (18.2 overs)
Chris Lynn 67 (48); Imad Wasim 2/31 (4 overs)		Michael Pepper 59 (40); Mujeeb Ur Rahman 2/31 (3.2 overs)

Abu Dhabi Knight Riders won by 6 wickets
Sheikh Zayed Cricket Stadium, Abu Dhabi
Umpires: Martin Saggers (Eng) and Rod Tucker (Aus)
Player of the match: Michael Pepper (Abu Dhabi Knight Riders)

- Abu Dhabi Knight Riders won the toss and elected to field.
- Sagar Kalyan (Abu Dhabi Knight Riders) made his T20 debut.

Match 17
1 February 2024
18:30 (N)
Scorecard

Desert Vipers; 169/6 (20 overs)	v	Dubai Capitals; 170/6 (20 overs)
Rohan Mustafa 50 (33); Sikandar Raza 1/28 (4 overs)		Ben Dunk 59 (30); Wanindu Hasaranga 2/25 (4 overs)

Dubai Capitals won by 4 wickets
Dubai Cricket Stadium, Dubai
Umpires: Akbar Ali (UAE) and Ruchira Palliyaguruge (SL)
Player of the match: Ben Dunk (Dubai Capitals)

- Dubai Capitals won the toss and elected to field.

Match 18
2 February 2024
18:30 (N)
Scorecard

Sharjah Warriors; 129 (20 overs)	v	MI Emirates; 133/2 (11.1 overs)
Sean Williams 35 (25); Waqar Salamkheil 3/18 (4 overs)		Kusal Perera 47 (27); James Fuller 1/18 (2 overs)

MI Emirates won by 8 wickets
Sheikh Zayed Cricket Stadium, Abu Dhabi
Umpires: Martin Saggers (Eng) and Shiju Sam (UAE)
Player of the match: Waqar Salamkheil (MI Emirates)

- MI Emirates won the toss and elected to field.

Match 19
3 February 2024
14:30 (D/N)
Scorecard

Gulf Giants; 160/7 (20 overs)	v	Desert Vipers; 161/4 (16.5 overs)
Shimron Hetmyer 40* (23); Mohammad Amir 3/34 (4 overs)		Colin Munro 51 (36); Zuhaib Zubair 2/49 (4 overs)

Desert Vipers won by 6 wickets
Dubai Cricket Stadium, Dubai
Umpires: Aleem Dar (Pak) and Ruchira Palliyaguruge (SL)
Player of the match: Azam Khan (Desert Vipers)

- Desert Vipers won the toss and elected to field.

Match 20
3 February 2024
18:30 (N)
Scorecard

Abu Dhabi Knight Riders; 183 (20 overs)	v	Dubai Capitals; 154/8 (20 overs)
Andre Russell 41 (16); Dushmantha Chameera 2/20 (4 overs)		Jason Holder 42 (21); Sunil Narine 2/22 (3 overs)

Abu Dhabi Knight Riders won by 29 runs
Sheikh Zayed Cricket Stadium, Abu Dhabi
Umpires: Shiju Sam (UAE) and Rod Tucker (Aus)
Player of the match: David Willey (Abu Dhabi Knight Riders)

- Dubai Capitals won the toss and elected to field.

Match 21
4 February 2024
14:30 (D/N)
Scorecard

MI Emirates; 188/5 (20 overs)	v	Desert Vipers; 158/8 (20 overs)
Kusal Perera 65 (46); Mohammad Amir 2/29 (4 overs)		Ali Naseer 63* (47); Fazalhaq Farooqi 4/31 (4 overs)

MI Emirates won by 30 runs
Sheikh Zayed Cricket Stadium, Abu Dhabi
Umpires: Martin Saggers (Eng) and Rod Tucker (Aus)
Player of the match: Nicholas Pooran (MI Emirates)

- Desert Vipers won the toss and elected to field.

Match 22
4 February 2024
18:30 (N)
Scorecard

Gulf Giants; 187/6 (20 overs)	v	Sharjah Warriors; 108 (17.3 overs)
Shimron Hetmyer 53* (28); Sean Williams 3/46 (4 overs)		Tom Kohler-Cadmore 39 (23); Zuhaib Zubair 4/22 (4 overs)

Gulf Giants won by 79 runs
Dubai International Cricket Stadium, Dubai
Umpires: Akbar Ali (UAE) and Ruchira Palliyaguruge (SL)
Player of the match: Zuhaib Zubair (Gulf Giants)

- Sharjah Warriors won the toss and elected to field.

Match 23
5 February 2024
18:30 (N)
Scorecard

Sharjah Warriors; 75 (17 overs)	v	Abu Dhabi Knight Riders; 79/3 (10.1 overs)
Daniel Sams 24 (19); Ravi Bopara 4/15 (4 overs)		Joe Clarke 34 (25); Muhammad Jawadullah 3/5 (2 overs)

Abu Dhabi Knight Riders won by 7 wickets
Sharjah Cricket Stadium, Sharjah
Umpires: Akbar Ali (UAE) and Ruchira Palliyaguruge (SL)
Player of the match: Josh Little (Abu Dhabi Knight Riders)

- Abu Dhabi Knight Riders won the toss and elected to field.

Match 24
6 February 2024
18:30 (N)
Scorecard

Gulf Giants; 126/9 (20 overs)	v	Dubai Capitals; 107 (18.3 overs)
Shimron Hetmyer 34 (28); Olly Stone 4/14 (4 overs)		Dasun Shanaka 24* (26); Aayan Afzal Khan 2/8 (3 overs)

Gulf Giants won by 19 runs
Dubai International Cricket Stadium, Dubai
Umpires: Martin Saggers (Eng) and Shiju Sam (UAE)
Player of the match: James Vince (Gulf Giants)

- Dubai Capitals won the toss and elected to field.

Match 25
7 February 2024
18:30 (N)
Scorecard

Abu Dhabi Knight Riders; 94 (17.1 overs)	v	Sharjah Warriors; 95/3 (13.5 overs)
Michael Pepper 32 (21); Adil Rashid 4/12 (4 overs)		Liam Livingstone 30 (13); Imad Wasim 2/20 (4 overs)

Sharjah Warriors won by 7 wickets
Sheikh Zayed Cricket Stadium, Abu Dhabi
Umpires: Aleem Dar (Pak) and Ruchira Palliyaguruge (SL)
Player of the match: Adil Rashid (Sharjah Warriors)

- Sharjah Warriors won the toss and elected to field.

Match 26
8 February 2024
18:30 (N)
Scorecard

Gulf Giants; 158/7 (20 overs)	v	MI Emirates; 153/7 (20 overs)
James Vince 59 (41); Waqar Salamkheil 3/19 (4 overs)		Kieron Pollard 40 (31); Chris Jordan 2/21 (3 overs)

Gulf Giants won by 5 runs
Dubai Cricket Stadium, Dubai
Umpires: Martin Saggers (Eng) and Shiju Sam (UAE)
Player of the match: Chris Jordan (Gulf Giants)

- MI Emirates won the toss and elected to field.

Match 27
9 February 2024
18:30 (N)
Scorecard

Desert Vipers; 171/7 (20 overs)	v	Dubai Capitals; 172/5 (20 overs)
Alex Hales 66 (37); Roelof van der Merwe 2/19 (3 overs)		Sikandar Raza 64* (45); Sam Curran 2/39 (4 overs)

Dubai Capitals won by 5 wickets
Dubai International Cricket Stadium, Dubai
Umpires: Adrian Holdstock (SA) and Shiju Sam (UAE)
Player of the match: Sikandar Raza (Dubai Capitals)

- Dubai Capitals won the toss and elected to field.

Match 28
10 February 2024
14:30 (D/N)
Scorecard

Gulf Giants; 166/3 (20 overs)	v	Abu Dhabi Knight Riders; 163/9 (20 overs)
Jordan Cox 57 (38); Ali Khan 2/39 (4 overs)		Jason Roy 47 (31); Jamie Overton 3/32 (4 overs)

Gulf Giants won by 3 runs
Dubai International Cricket Stadium, Dubai
Umpires: Adrian Holdstock (SA) and Martin Saggers (Eng)
Player of the match: Jamie Overton (Gulf Giants)

- Gulf Giants won the toss and elected to bat.

Match 29
10 February 2024
18:30 (N)
Scorecard

Dubai Capitals; 147/9 (20 overs)	v	MI Emirates; 128/8 (20 overs)
Max Holden 51 (33); Dan Mousley 2/22 (4 overs)		Andre Fletcher 45 (38); Haider Ali 3/16 (4 overs)

Dubai Capitals won by 19 runs
Sheikh Zayed Cricket Stadium, Abu Dhabi
Umpires: Akbar Ali (UAE) and Ruchira Palliyaguruge (SL)
Player of the match: Haider Ali (Dubai Capitals)

- MI Emirates won the toss and elected to field.

Match 30
11 February 2024
18:30 (N)
Scorecard

Sharjah Warriors; 121/9 (18 overs)	v	Desert Vipers; 123/4 (12.5 overs)
Luke Wells 31 (28); Nathan Sowter 3/21 (4 overs)		Phil Salt 30 (12); Junaid Siddique 2/16 (2 overs)

Desert Vipers won by 6 wickets
Sharjah Cricket Stadium, Sharjah
Umpires: Aleem Dar (Pak) and Ruchira Palliyaguruge (SL)
Player of the match: Nathan Sowter (Desert Vipers)

- Desert Vipers won the toss and elected to field.
- The match was reduced to 18 overs per side due to rain.

== Playoffs ==
Qualifier 1
14 February 2024 — Dubai
1	MI Emirates	163/7 (20 overs)
2	Gulf Giants	118 (18.2 overs)
Eliminator
13 February 2024 — Abu Dhabi
3	Abu Dhabi Knight Riders	103 (16.5 overs)
4	Dubai Capitals	188/5 (20 overs)

Qualifier 2
15 February 2024 — Sharjah
Q1L	Gulf Giants	138/6 (20 overs)
EW	Dubai Capitals	139/1 (15.5 overs)

Final
17 February 2024 — Dubai
Q1W	MI Emirates	208/3 (20 overs)
Q2W	Dubai Capitals	163/7 (20 overs)

=== Eliminator ===
Match 31
13 February 2024
18:30 (N)
Scorecard

Dubai Capitals; 188/5 (20 overs)	v	Abu Dhabi Knight Riders; 103 (16.5 overs)
Sam Billings 46* (26); Sabir Ali 2/35 (3 overs)		David Willey 36 (27); Scott Kuggeleijn 4/17 (3.5 overs)

Dubai Capitals won by 85 runs
Sheikh Zayed Cricket Stadium, Abu Dhabi
Umpires: Aleem Dar (Pak) and Ruchira Palliyaguruge (SL)
Player of the match: Sikandar Raza (Dubai Capitals)

- Abu Dhabi Knight Riders won the toss and elected to field.

=== Qualifier 1 ===
Match 32
14 February 2024
18:30 (N)
Scorecard

MI Emirates; 163/7 (20 overs)	v	Gulf Giants; 118 (18.2 overs)
Nicholas Pooran 36 (28); Daniel Worrall 3/15 (4 overs)		Chris Jordan 31 (15); Vijayakanth Viyaskanth 3/22 (4 overs)

MI Emirates won by 45 runs
Dubai International Cricket Stadium, Dubai
Umpires: Adrian Holdstock (SA) and Martin Saggers (Eng)
Player of the match: Akeal Hosein (MI Emirates)

- Gulf Giants won the toss and elected to field.

=== Qualifier 2 ===
Match 33
15 February 2024
18:30 (N)
Scorecard

Gulf Giants; 138/6 (20 overs)	v	Dubai Capitals; 139/1 (15.5 overs)
James Vince 58 (53); Jason Holder 1/7 (2 overs)		Leus du Plooy 63* (40); Liam Dawson 1/21 (4 overs)

Dubai Capitals won by 9 wickets
Sharjah Cricket Stadium, Sharjah
Umpires: Adrian Holdstock (SA) and Martin Saggers (Eng)
Player of the match: Leus du Plooy (Dubai Capitals)

- Gulf Giants won the toss and elected to bat.

=== Final ===
Match 34
17 February 2024
18:30 (N)
Scorecard

MI Emirates; 208/3 (20 overs)	v	Dubai Capitals; 163/7 (20 overs)
Nicholas Pooran 57* (27); Zahir Khan 1/21 (4 overs)		Sam Billings 40 (29); Trent Boult 2/20 (4 overs)

MI Emirates won by 45 runs
Dubai International Cricket Stadium, Dubai
Umpires: Adrian Holdstock (SA) and Ruchira Palliyaguruge (SL)
Player of the match: Nicholas Pooran (MI Emirates)

- Dubai Capitals won the toss and elected to field.

== Statistics ==
Most runs
Player	Team	Runs
James Vince	Gulf Giants	356
Nicholas Pooran	Desert Vipers	354
Kusal Perera	MI Emirates	335
Muhammad Waseem	MI Emirates	321
Sam Billings	Dubai Capitals	320

Most wickets
Player	Team	Wickets
Fazalhaq Farooqi	MI Emirates	17
Waqar Salamkheil	MI Emirates	17
Trent Boult	MI Emirates	16
Scott Kuggeleijn	Dubai Capitals	13
Sikandar Raza	Dubai Capitals	13

End of season awards
Award	Winner	Team
Most Valuable Player (MVP)	Sikandar Raza	Dubai Capitals
Best UAE player	Muhammad Waseem	MI Emirates

== Attendances ==
The average league attendance was 5,889 and the total attendance was over 200,000.

#	Club	Average
1	MI Emirates	6,473
2	Gulf Giants	6,197
3	Desert Vipers	6,156
4	Dubai Capitals	5,895
5	Abu Dhabi Knight Riders	5,624
6	Sharjah Warriors	4,991
