= Khuzaima Tanveer =

Pakistani-born Emirati cricketer

Personal information
- Full name: Khuzaima Iqbal Tanveer
- Born: 20 December 1999 (age 26); Faisalabad, Punjab, Pakistan
- Batting: Right-handed
- Bowling: Right-arm fast
- Role: Bowler

International information
- National side: United Arab Emirates
- ODI debut (cap 126): 25 April 2026 v Nepal
- Last ODI: 12 September 2026 v Nepal
- T20I debut (cap 99): 20 April 2026 v Nepal
- Last T20I: 17 September 2026 v Malaysia

Domestic team information
- Years: Team
- 2025–present: Desert Vipers
- 2026: Karachi Kings

Career statistics
Competition	ODI	T20I	LA	T20
Matches	5	5	9	24
Runs scored	79	70	111	164
Batting average	19.75	35.00	22.20	27.33
100s/50s	0/0	0/1	0/0	0/1
Top score	49	68*	49	68*
Balls bowled	225	107	328	491
Wickets	8	7	12	33
Bowling average	24.12	18.85	23.91	19.30
5 wickets in innings	0	0	0	0
10 wickets in match	0	0	0	0
Best bowling	3/12	3/29	3/21	4/10
Catches/stumpings	1/–	3/–	1/–	6/–
- Source: Cricinfo, 25 September 2026

Khuzaima Iqbal Tanveer (born 20 December 1999) is a Pakistani-born Emirati cricketer who represents the United Arab Emirates. A right-arm fast bowler and right-handed batsman, he was born in Faisalabad, Punjab, Pakistan, and relocated to the United Arab Emirates in 2023. He came to prominence in the International League T20 (ILT20) with the Desert Vipers, before being granted UAE citizenship through naturalisation in April 2026 and making his international debut for the UAE the same month.

== Early life ==
Khuzaima was born on 20 December 1999 in Faisalabad, Punjab, Pakistan. He relocated to the United Arab Emirates in 2023 to pursue a professional cricket career, having previously played club cricket in Pakistan.

== Career ==
=== Franchise cricket ===
Khuzaima made his franchise T20 debut for the Desert Vipers in the 2024–25 International League T20, playing against the Sharjah Warriorz on 25 January 2025. He took four wickets for 22 runs in four overs and was named player of the match as the Vipers won by eight wickets.

In December 2025, during the 2025–26 International League T20, he recorded career-best bowling figures of four for ten against the Gulf Giants, again winning the player-of-the-match award as the Vipers won by eight wickets. That performance earned him a nomination for the ESPNcricinfo Awards 2025 in the men's T20 leagues bowling category. He finished the season as the Vipers' leading wicket-taker, with seventeen wickets from eleven matches at an economy rate of 7.5, as the side won their first ILT20 title. Across both ILT20 seasons with the Vipers, he took 24 wickets in 18 matches.

In February 2026, he was selected by the Karachi Kings in the Pakistan Super League player draft. The Emirates Cricket Board subsequently recalled him from the Karachi Kings squad to join the UAE national team for a tour of Nepal.

=== International career ===
In April 2026, Khuzaima was one of five cricketers granted UAE citizenship through naturalisation under a 2018 Presidential decree that opened pathways for foreign-born athletes to represent the UAE in sport. He made his T20 International debut against Nepal on 20 April 2026, and his One Day International debut against the same opponents on 25 April 2026, as part of a Cricket World Cup League 2 tri-series in Kathmandu. In his third ODI appearance, on 1 May 2026, he contributed a batting innings of 49 from 26 balls before the UAE fell narrowly short of their target, losing by 37 runs.
