= Rahul Chopra =

Emirati cricketer (born 1994)

Personal information
- Born: 7 November 1994 (age 32); Sharjah, United Arab Emirates
- Batting: Right-handed
- Role: Wicket-keeper

International information
- National side: United Arab Emirates (2024-present)
- ODI debut (cap 108): 28 February 2024 v Canada
- Last ODI: 8 May 2025 v Scotland
- T20I debut (cap 74): 11 March 2024 v Scotland
- Last T20I: 21 December 2024 v Kuwait

Domestic team information
- Years: Team
- 2023-present: Dubai Capitals
- 2023: Johannesburg Buffaloes

Career statistics
Competition	ODI	T20I	LA	T20
Matches	14	20	14	32
Runs scored	383	454	383	556
Batting average	27.35	34.94	27.35	31.62
100s/50s	1/2	0/3	1/2	0/4
Top score	101	80	101	80
Catches/stumpings	7/0	11/0	7/0	16/0
- Source: Cricinfo, 21 May 2025

Rahul Chopra (born 7 November 1994) is an Emirati cricketer who plays for the United Arab Emirates cricket team. He primarily plays as a wicket-keeper and right-handed batsman.

== International career ==
In February 2024, Rahul Chopra was named in the UAE national squad for 2024–2026 Cricket World Cup League 2. He made his One Day International (ODI) debut against Canada on 28 February 2024. He scored his maiden ODI century against Scotland on 8 May 2025, making 101 at VRA Cricket Ground, Amstelveen, Netherlands.

== Franchise career ==
He made his Twenty20 debut for Dubai Capitals against MI Emirates in 2024 International League T20 on 20 January 2024.
