= Haider Ali (Emirati cricketer) =

Pakistani cricketer (born 1994)

Personal information
- Born: 5 July 1994 (age 32); Lahore, Punjab, Pakistan
- Batting: Left-handed
- Bowling: Slow left-arm orthodox
- Role: Bowler

International information
- National side: United Arab Emirates
- ODI debut (cap 116): 28 October 2025 v United States
- Last ODI: 30 October 2025 v Nepal
- T20I debut (cap 83): 17 May 2025 v Bangladesh
- Last T20I: 19 May 2025 v Bangladesh

Domestic team information
- Years: Team
- 2018: Zarai Taraqiati Bank Limited
- 2023–present: Dubai Capitals
- Source: Cricinfo, 29 January 2024

Haider Ali (born 5 July 1994) is a Pakistani-born cricketer who plays for the United Arab Emirates national cricket team.

== Career ==
He made his first-class debut for Zarai Taraqiati Bank Limited in the 2018–19 Quaid-e-Azam Trophy on 25 September 2018. In 2022, Ali moved to United Arab Emirates from Pakistan. He made his Twenty20 (T20) debut for Dubai Capitals in the 2024 International League T20 on 29 January 2024.

Ali made his List A debut on 22 September 2018 in 2018–19 Quaid-e-Azam One Day Cup.

In May 2025, he was named in UAE national team for the series against Bangladesh. He made his Twenty20 International (T20I) debut in the same series on 17 May 2025.

In January 2026, Haider Ali was named in UAE's squad for the 2026 T20 World Cup.
