= Gulf Giants =

Cricket team in UAE's ILT20

- League: International League T20

Personnel
- Captain: Heinrich Klaasen
- Coach: Simon Helmot
- Owner: Adani Group

Team information
- City: Dubai, United Arab Emirates
- Colours: Orange and Gold
- Founded: 2023; 3 years ago
- Home ground: Dubai International Cricket Stadium, Dubai
- Capacity: 25,000

History
- Twenty20 debut: v. Abu Dhabi Knight Riders at Sheikh Zayed Cricket Stadium, Abu Dhabi; 15 January 2023
- ILT20 wins: 1 (2023)
- Official website: http://www.gulfgiants.com
T20I kit

The Gulf Giants is a professional franchise cricket team that participates in the International League T20, organised by the Emirates Cricket Board. It was one of the six teams that were announced for the inaugural season of the tournament. Founded in 2022, the team is owned by the sports arm of India’s leading business conglomerate Adani Group, which also owns Gujarat Giants in the PKL and Gujarat Giants in the WPL.

The Gulf Giants became the inaugural champions of the ILT20 after they beat Desert Vipers by 7 wickets in the final at the Dubai International Stadium. The Giants are captained by English batter, James Vince, while Andy Flower serves as the head coach.

The Gulf Giants retained most of their core team ahead of the second season of the ILT20, and added other T20 stars such as Jamie Smith, Jordan Cox, and Usman Khan to their roster. They qualified for the Playoffs but were unable to reach the final.

== History ==
In August 2022, the Emirates Cricket Board (ECB) announced the establishment of the International League T20, a Twenty20 Cricket competition to be started in 2023. The teams for the competition, representing 6 different regions of the United Arab Emirates, including Dubai, were put up for auction in UAE in September 2022. The Gulf franchise was purchased by Adani Sportsline, led by Adani Group. The team unveiled their logo and jersey in January 2023 through their social media handles.

In January 2023, Gulf Giants released their anthem ‘Bring It On’, composed and performed by the popular Bollywood composer Salim-Sulaiman.

=== 2024 Season ===
The Gulf Giants started their second season strongly by defeating the Sharjah Warriors by 31 runs. Jamie Smith scored 42 runs off 18 balls. Contributions from Usman Khan and Jordan Cox helped Gulf Giants post 198. Jamie Overton then starred with a 3-wicket haul as the Giants got their season off to a winning start.

Overton scored 41 in 18 balls against the MI Emirates in the Giants’ second game during the run chase but it was not enough to chase the score set by the MI Emirates.

Chris Lynn then scored 67 against Abu Dhabi Knight Riders, but the Knight Riders managed to chase down the total. After the loss against the Vipers in their next game, the Gulf Giants went on a 4-match winning streak. Shimron Hetmyer's innings of 53 helped the Giants put up a score of 187. Zuhaib Zubair took 4 wickets for 22 runs and Giants picked up a crucial win.

They faced MI Emirates in Qualifier 1, where they were defeated by 45 runs. The Giants faced the Dubai Capitals in Qualifier 2, where James Vince scored a fifty. The Giants scored 138 runs in their 20 overs, which was not enough as the Dubai Capitals chased down the score in 15.5 overs.

Vince was the highest run-scorer in the tournament, scoring 356 runs, while Zuhaib Zubair was the highest wicket-taker for the Giants, with 11 wickets.

=== 2023 season ===
Gulf Giants began their season with a match-up against Abu Dhabi Knight Riders. Thanks to Sanchit Sharma's spell of 3/9 and Chris Jordan's 3/28, Giants were able to restrict Knight Riders to a low total of 114/9 in their 20 overs. Giants were able to chase down this target in 14.2 overs, with James Vince scoring the first half-century for the team. He finished with 62(44).

They played their second match against Dubai Capitals, which they won by 6 wickets. Rehan Ahmed scalped three wickets and Vince top-scored with his knock of 83*(56). Giants went on to win their next two matches, until their winning streak was broken by Sharjah Warriors, who defeated them by 21 runs. This was the only match that Giants lost in the league stage.

Their next two league matches were abandoned due to rain. They won their eighth match against MI Emirates, with this win they qualified into the play-offs with still two matches to spare. Giants moved on to win their last two league matches, where David Wiese took the best bowling figures against Sharjah Warriors, his figures read 5/20 in his quota of 4 overs. Giants finished the league stage by topping the table with 16 points from 7 wins in 10 matches.

In the play-offs, Giants faced Desert Vipers in the Qualifier-1. Vipers defeated Giants by 19 runs to qualify for the final, and the Giants had to play Qualifier-2 in order to play in the final. They were matched up against MI Emirates in the Qualifier-2, courtesy Vince's brilliant knock of 83*(56), they won the match by 4 wickets. They faced Vipers in the final at the Dubai International Stadium, Vipers posted a total of 146/8 with Wanindu Hasaranga scoring a quickfire 55 off 27 balls and Carlos Brathwaite finished with figures 3/19, he scalped the wickets of Alex Hales, Sam Billings and Tom Curran, Qais Ahmad restricted the Vipers by taking the wicket of in form Hasaranga. In the second innings, Chris Lynn smashed an unbeaten 72 off 50 deliveries to help the team win the match and the tournament. Brathwaite was adjudged the player of the match in the final, Chris Jordan ended up winning the green belt for taking most wickets (20) in the tournament, and Vince finished the season as the second highest run-scorer with 439 runs in 11 matches.

== Current squad ==
- Players with international caps are listed in **bold**.

Gulf Giants 2026
No.	Name	Nationality	Birth date	Batting style	Bowling style	Year signed	Notes
Batters
10	**David Miller**	South Africa	10 June 1989 (age 37)	Left-handed	Right-arm off break	2026	
Wicket-keepers
45	**Heinrich Klaasen**	South Africa	30 July 1991 (age 35)	Right-handed	Right-arm off break	2026	
63	**Jos Buttler**	England	8 September 1990 (age 36)	Right-handed	—	2026	
All-rounders
9	**Azmatullah Omarzai**	Afghanistan	24 March 2000 (age 26)	Right-handed	Right-arm medium-fast	2026	
Bowlers
40	**Blessing Muzarabani**	Zimbabwe	2 October 1996 (age 30)	Right-handed	Right-arm fast medium	2026	

== Season ==
Year	League standing	Final standing
2023	1st out of 6	Champion
2024	2nd out of 6	Playoffs
2025	5th out of 6	League Stage
2025–26	5th out of 6	League Stage

== Administration and support staff ==
Position	Name
Head coach	Simon Helmot
Batting coach	Michael Klinger
Bowling coach	Shane Bond
Fielding coach	Kadeer Ali
Strength & conditioning coach	Gary Brent
physiotherapist	James Pipe

=== Coaching history ===
Name	Years	Position	ref
Andy Flower	2023—2025	Head coach	
Jonathan Trott	2025–26	Head coach	
Simon Helmot	2026–present	Head coach	

== Statistics and records ==
=== Most runs ===
Name	Matches	Runs
James Vince	12	356
Chris Lynn	10	284
Shimron Hetmyer	12	228
Jordan Cox	12	215
Usman Khan	8	164

Source: ESPNCricinfo.

=== Most wickets ===
Player name	Matches	Wickets
Zuhaib Zubair	8	11
Chris Jordan	11	11
Jamie Overton	10	10
Aayan Khan	8	6
Blessing Muzarabani	7	6

Source: ESPNCricinfo.

=== Most runs ===
Name	Matches	Runs
James Vince	11	439
Chris Lynn	8	278
Shimron Hetmyer	10	257
Gerhard Erasmus	8	141
David Wiese	11	103

Source: ESPNCricinfo.

=== Most wickets ===
Player name	Matches	Wickets
Chris Jordan	10	20
David Wiese	11	18
Carlos Brathwaite	5	8
Rehan Ahmed	6	8
Sanchit Sharma	11	7

Source: ESPNCricinfo.

== Kit manufacturers and sponsors ==
Season	Kit manufacturer	Shirt sponsor (front)	Shirt sponsor (back)	Chest branding
2023	T10 Sports	Ambuja Cements	Fortune	Tata Capital
2024	T10 Sports	ACC Ltd.	Fortune	Unicon365
2025		ACC Ltd.	Fortune	
2025–26		ACC Ltd.	Fortune	Wolf 999 News
