= Sam Hain =

English cricketer (born 1995)

Personal information
- Full name: Samuel Robert Hain
- Born: 16 July 1995 (age 31); Hong Kong
- Height: 5 ft 10 in (1.78 m)
- Batting: Right-handed
- Bowling: Right-arm off break
- Role: Middle-order batter

International information
- National side: England (2023)
- ODI debut (cap 271): 23 September 2023 v Ireland
- Last ODI: 26 September 2023 v Ireland
- ODI shirt no.: 48

Domestic team information
- Years: Team
- 2013–present: Warwickshire (squad no. 16)
- 2017–2018: Marylebone Cricket Club (MCC)
- 2021: Manchester Originals
- 2022: Fortune Barishal
- 2022: Welsh Fire
- 2022/23: Brisbane Heat
- 2023–present: Trent Rockets
- 2023/24: Hobart Hurricanes
- 2024: Abu Dhabi Knight Riders
- 2025: Paarl Royals

Career statistics
Competition	ODI	FC	LA	T20
Matches	2	150	65	190
Runs scored	106	8,979	3,084	5,359
Batting average	53.00	42.96	58.18	38.83
100s/50s	0/1	21/50	10/18	1/40
Top score	89	208	161*	112*
Catches/stumpings	0/–	138/–	22/–	90/–
- Source: Cricinfo, 26 September 2026
- Hain's voice recorded April 2015

Samuel Robert Hain (born 16 July 1995) is a cricketer who plays for Warwickshire County Cricket Club and represents England. He is a right-handed batsman who bowls right-arm off spin. He made his debut for the county in the 2013 Yorkshire Bank 40 against Worcestershire.

== Early life and youth career ==
Hain was born in Hong Kong to two British parents. His family settled on Australia's Gold Coast when Hain was three years of age and there he began playing cricket for the Mudgeeraba-Nerang Cricket Club. He was raised in the Australian beachside city until the age of 14 when he relocated to Scotland on an exchange program with the Loretto School in Musselburgh, East Lothian. He was fast-tracked into Australian Under-19 cricket side as a 16-year-old. As a Loretto School student, he was spotted by former Warwickshire captain Michael Powell, who was coaching there. He returned to the Gold Coast for Year Twelve education where he completed his schooling at The Southport School.

Hain was sent for trials at Warwickshire where former England all-rounder Rikki Clarke rated his new colleague's batting in the nets as the best he had ever seen. Hain made his debut for the club's 2nd XI that year and impressed sufficiently to win Warwickshire's most promising young player award. He continued his progress by topping the county's Championship batting averages - for regular players, at least - in 2015.

In April 2022, he was bought by the Welsh Fire for the 2022 season of The Hundred.

== Domestic career ==
Hain was regarded as an excellent prospect for English cricket and known as a 360-degree hitter for having highest batting average than anyone to have played 50 innings or more in limited overs cricket.

He broke into the Australia U19 squad aged just 16, and played for Australia in the 2012 ICC Under-19 Cricket World Cup as the team finished runners-up. In March 2013, Hain committed himself to England and agreed a contract with Warwickshire.

He made his Twenty20 debut on 20 May 2016 for Birmingham Bears against Nottinghamshire in the 2016 NatWest t20 Blast. He impressively shone on his debut match scoring an unbeaten 92 off 54 balls, and was awarded the player of the match. This was also his first ever player of the match award in his career.

On 29 May 2020, Hain was named in a 55-man group of players to begin training ahead of international fixtures starting in England following the COVID-19 pandemic. On 9 July 2020, Hain was included in England's 24-man squad to start training behind closed doors for the One Day International (ODI) series against Ireland.

Hain is one of the all-time highest run scorers for the Birmingham Bears in T20 Blast. On 17 June 2022, in the 2022 T20 Blast, Hain scored his first century in Twenty20 cricket, with 112 not out.

Hain trained with the Brisbane Heat in the BBL12 and came in the starting XI after Sam Billings and Colin Munro departed to take part in other leagues, making 5 and 6 in his first two games. Hain was previously a part of the Queensland U19 Squad before he made the choice to pursue a career in England.

In March 2025, Hain signed a new three-year contract with Warwickshire.

== England ==
Hain was called into the England squad in September 2023 for the one day series against Ireland, his first call up for the senior team.
