= List of cricket grounds in the United Arab Emirates =

This is a list of cricket grounds in the United Arab Emirates. The grounds included in this list have held first-class, List-A and Twenty20 matches. Additionally, some have hosted Test matches, One Day Internationals and Twenty20 Internationals. The United Arab Emirates is the only nation that is not a full member of the International Cricket Council to have hosted Test matches.

== List of grounds ==
Name	City	First used	Last used	F/C	LA	T20	Notes
Al-Jazira Mohammed Bin Zayed Stadium	Abu Dhabi	1999	1999	0	3	0	Hosted 3 List A matches in 1999 between the 'A' teams of India, Pakistan and Sri Lanka.
Sheikh Zayed Cricket Stadium	Abu Dhabi	2004	2023	19	41	50	Test Venue
Tolerance Oval	Abu Dhabi	2012	2015	0	0	13	
Zayed Stadium Nursery 2	Abu Dhabi	2012	2021	0	0	8	
Ajman Oval	Ajman	2015	2015	0	0	0	
Dubai Cricket Council Ground No. 1	Dubai	2004	2004	0	6	0	Hosted 5 List A matches during the 2004 ICC Six Nations Challenge.
Dubai Cricket Council Ground No. 2	Dubai	2004	2004	0	5	0	Hosted 5 List A matches during the 2004 ICC Six Nations Challenge.
Dubai International Cricket Stadium	Dubai	2009	2023	10	27	53	Test Venue
ICC Cricket Academy Ground No. 1	Dubai	2010	2019	6	22	28	ODI & T20I Venue
ICC Cricket Academy Ground No. 2	Dubai	2011	2011	0	6	26	
Sharjah Cricket Stadium	Sharjah	1984	2023	22	238	38	Test Venue
