= Nathan Sowter =

Australian-born English cricketer (born 1992)

Personal information
- Full name: Nathan Adam Sowter
- Born: 12 October 1992 (age 34); Penrith, New South Wales, Australia
- Batting: Right-handed
- Bowling: Right-arm leg break
- Role: Bowler

Domestic team information
- Years: Team
- 2015–2022: Middlesex (squad no. 72)
- 2022: → Durham (on loan)
- 2021–present: MI London
- 2023–2026: Durham (squad no. 72)
- 2024–2025: Desert Vipers
- 2024: Guyana Amazon Warriors
- 2025/26: Sharjah Warriorz
- First-class debut: 6 August 2017 Middlesex v Warwickshire
- List A debut: 12 June 2016 Middlesex v Sussex

Career statistics
| Competition | FC | LA | T20 |
|---|---|---|---|
| Matches | 13 | 19 | 195 |
| Runs scored | 292 | 134 | 270 |
| Batting average | 15.36 | 14.88 | 9.00 |
| 100s/50s | 0/2 | 0/0 | 0/0 |
| Top score | 57* | 31 | 37* |
| Balls bowled | 1,870 | 1,008 | 3,628 |
| Wickets | 20 | 36 | 196 |
| Bowling average | 51.60 | 25.77 | 24.07 |
| 5 wickets in innings | 0 | 1 | 1 |
| 10 wickets in match | 0 | 0 | 0 |
| Best bowling | 3/42 | 6/62 | 5/15 |
| Catches/stumpings | 12/– | 17/– | 78/– |
- Source: ESPNcricinfo, 15 August 2026

Nathan Adam Sowter (born 12 October 1992) is an Australian-born English cricketer. He was born at Penrith, New South Wales.

A leg spinner, he made his debut for Middlesex in a T20 match in May 2015, taking 2 wickets for 2 runs in the four balls he delivered. He made his first-class debut for Middlesex in the 2017 County Championship on 6 August 2017.

In April 2022, he was bought by the Oval Invincibles for the 2022 season of The Hundred.

Sowter joined Durham on loan during the 2022 season before making the move permanent in December that year. In September 2026, it was announced that he had agreed a multi-year, white-ball only, contract with Surrey starting from the 2027 county season.
