= International League T20 =

Professional Twenty20 cricket league

- Tournament logo
- Administrator: Emirates Cricket Board
- Format: Twenty20
- First edition: 2023
- Latest edition: 2025–26
- Tournament format: Round-robin and playoffs
- Number of teams: 6
- Current champion: Desert Vipers (1st title)
- Most successful: Gulf Giants; MI Emirates; Dubai Capitals; Desert Vipers (1 title each)
- Most runs: James Vince (1,156)
- Most wickets: Fazalhaq Farooqi (50)
- Website: www.ilt20.ae
- 2026 International League T20

The International League T20 (ILT20) is a professional T20 cricket league held in the United Arab Emirates. The competition is sanctioned by the Emirates Cricket Board and features six franchise teams. The Gulf Giants won the inaugural season in 2023, followed by MI Emirates in 2024, Dubai Capitals in 2025, and the Desert Vipers in the 2025–26 season.

The ILT20 allows a higher number of overseas players than most T20 leagues, with up to nine overseas players permitted in a playing XI. Each team must also include at least one player from the UAE and one player from an Associate Member nation in the playing XI.

== History ==
The league was officially announced by the Emirates Cricket Board (ECB) in June 2022 as a professional Twenty20 franchise league based in the United Arab Emirates. The league was initially planned to begin in early 2023, with its first season window announced in June 2022. However, due to scheduling conflicts and organisational preparations, the inaugural edition was later rescheduled and eventually held from 13 January to 12 February 2023.

The league was created with the aim of establishing a world-class T20 tournament and positioning the UAE as a major destination on the global cricket calendar. The tournament featured six city-based franchises, several of which were owned by companies that also own teams in other major leagues such as the Indian Premier League, including ownership links to Mumbai Indians, Kolkata Knight Riders, and Delhi Capitals.

The ILT20 adopted a distinctive squad composition policy, allowing teams to field up to nine overseas players in a playing XI, significantly higher than most other franchise leagues. To support domestic cricket development, each team was required to include at least two UAE players in their squad.

Although the tournament initially did not have official status because the Emirates Cricket Board is an Associate member of the International Cricket Council, the ILT20 became the first Associate member–run franchise league to be granted List A status by the ICC in December 2023. As a result, all matches and player statistics are officially recognised.

The inaugural season was won by Gulf Giants, who defeated Desert Vipers in the final.

=== 2024 (2nd edition) ===
The second edition of the tournament began on 19 January and concluded on 17 February.

The first 2 seasons accumulated 340 Million views globally. 108 million people tuned in from across India even though attendance was low. The second ILT20 season was won by MI Emirates defeated Dubai Capitals by 45 runs to win the title.

=== 2025–26 (4th edition) ===
The fourth season of the International League T20 (ILT20) began on 2 December 2025, earlier than usual to avoid a clash with the 2026 Men's T20 World Cup in February. The tournament will conclude on 4 January 2026.

For the 2025–26 season, the ILT20 adopted a player auction format for the first time, replacing the draft system used in previous years. The auction is scheduled to take place in Dubai on 1 October 2025. Each team had already made retentions and direct signings earlier in the year, and was allowed to spend up to USD 800,000 during the auction, with an overall squad budget ranging from USD 1.5 million to USD 2 million.

=== 2026 (5th edition) ===
On 13 April 2026, the Emirates Cricket Board confirmed the window for the fifth season. To avoid overlapping with other global T20 leagues like the SA20, the tournament was moved forward to a November–December window, continuing the trend of shifting away from the original January–February slot used in the first three editions.

The fifth season will begin on 22 November 2026, earlier than usual to avoid a clash with the SA20.The tournament will conclude on 20 December 2026.

The auction took place on 1 October 2026. List of 2026 International League T20 auctions and personnel signings - Wikipedia.

== Organisation ==
=== Trophy ===
The ILT20 Trophy was designed and made by London-based silversmiths Thomas Lyte. Unveiled in October 2022, the trophy's design is intended to reflect the spirit of the league and the heritage and culture of the UAE. The trophy measures 830mm in height, directly proportional to the 830m Burj Khalifa. The falcon is the UAE’s national bird, and its teardrop shape makes up the trophy’s form, while the seven Emirates that make up the UAE form a seven-pointed crown. Inspired by the shape of the sands of Tel Moreeb, the finial sits on top of the trophy holding a cricket ball.

== Teams ==
Team	Captain	Owner	Head coach
Abu Dhabi Knight Riders	Jason Holder	Knight Riders Group	Dwayne Bravo
Desert Vipers	Sam Curran	Lancer Capital LLC	James Foster
Dubai Capitals	Dasun Shanaka	GMR Group	Hemang Badani
Gulf Giants	James Vince	Adani Group	Jonathan Trott
MI Emirates	Kieron Pollard	Reliance Industries	Robin Singh
Sharjah Warriorz	Tim Southee	Capri Global Holdings	JP Duminy

== Tournament results ==
Season	Final venue	Winners	Result	Runners-up	No. of teams	Player of the series
2023	Dubai International Cricket Stadium, Dubai	Gulf Giants; 149/3 (18.4 overs)	Gulf Giants won by 7 wickets Scorecard	Desert Vipers; 146/8 (20 overs)	6	Chris Jordan (GG)
2024	Dubai International Cricket Stadium, Dubai	MI Emirates; 208/3 (20 overs)	MI Emirates won by 45 runs Scorecard	Dubai Capitals; 163/7 (20 overs)	6	Sikandar Raza (DC)
2025	Dubai International Cricket Stadium, Dubai	Dubai Capitals; 191/6 (19.2 overs)	Dubai Capitals won by 4 wickets Scorecard	Desert Vipers; 189/5 (20 overs)	6	Sam Curran (DV)
2025–26	Dubai International Cricket Stadium, Dubai	Desert Vipers; 182/4 (20 overs)	Desert Vipers won by 46 runs Scorecard	MI Emirates; 136 (18.3 overs)	6	Sam Curran (DV)

== Grounds ==

Dubai	Sharjah	Abu Dhabi
Dubai International Cricket Stadium	Sharjah Cricket Stadium	Sheikh Zayed Cricket Stadium
Capacity: 25,000	Capacity: 16,000	Capacity: 20,000

== Teams' performances ==
Season	2023	2024	2025	2025–26
Abu Dhabi Knight Riders	6th	4th	6th	3rd
Dubai Capitals	4th	RU	C	4th
Desert Vipers	RU	5th	RU	C
Gulf Giants	C	3rd	5th	5th
MI Emirates	3rd	C	4th	RU
Sharjah Warriorz	5th	6th	3rd	6th

- Champions
- Runners Up

== Rules ==
The ILT20 has a number of rules which vary from the established Laws of cricket or those used in other Twenty20 leagues:

- Nine out of eleven players on each team can be overseas players, which will be significantly higher than the four or five overseas-player-limit of other major T20 leagues. Two players on each team must be a UAE player and a player from an Associate Member nation respectively.
- Teams can use a substitute, termed a "Super Sub", from a list of Seven players named as possible substitutes. The substitution can be made before the start of innings, when a wicket falls, when a batter retires, or at the end of an over. Both teams can introduce a substitute once per match.

== Controversy ==
There has been some controversy around the ILT20's plan to only require one local (UAE) player in the playing XI of each team, with several Full Members calling for regulations requiring a higher minimum number of local players in the ILT20 and other T20 leagues. Attendance was low due to lack of participation of Indian cricketers.

== Records and statistics ==
Batting
Most runs	Alex Hales (DV)	1,156
Highest score	Alex Hales (DV)	110 (59) vs Knight Riders (20 January 2023)
Highest partnership	Andre Fletcher & Tom Banton (MIE)	198 vs (Vipers) (27 January 2025)
Bowling
Most wickets	Fazalhaq Farooqi (MIE)	50
Fielding
Most dismissals (wicket-keeper)	Nicholas Pooran (MIE)	25
Most catches (fielder)	Muhammad Waseem (MIE)	20
Team records
Highest total	MI Emirates	241/3 (20) vs Vipers (29 January 2023)
Lowest total	Sharjah Warriorz	74 (12.1) vs Emirates (26 January 2024)
Lowest total	Desert Vipers	74 (12.3) vs Emirates (27 January 2025)

As of 14 February 2025

== Broadcasters ==
In May 2021, Essel Group owned Zee Entertainment Enterprises bought the media rights of this league for ten years from 2023 to 2032 at a cost of US$120 million. (Also see approx. $10.2 million a year). The events are attended by international celebrities and cricket legends every year.

Territory/Region	Channel
Afghanistan	Ariana Television
Australia	Fox Cricket
Bangladesh	Nagorik TV; T Sports; Toffee
Caribbean	Rush Sports
India	Zee (various channels)
Maldives	Medianet
Middle East and North Africa	Cricbuzz
Nepal	Styx Sports; Sim TV Nepal; Net TV Nepal
New Zealand	Sky Sport (New Zealand)
Pakistan	TAPMAD; PTV Sports; Geo Super; A Sports
Sri Lanka	&flix Supreme TV
UAE	Cricbuzz
United Kingdom	BT Sport; Zee TV; Sky Sports
North America	Willow (TV channel)

- Source: ILT20.
