= Matiullah Khan =

Pakistani cricketer (born 1993)

Personal information
- Born: 1 March 1993 (age 33); Bannu, Khyber Pakhtunkhwa, Pakistan
- Batting: Right-handed
- Bowling: Right-arm fast-medium
- Role: Bowler

International information
- National side: United Arab Emirates
- Only ODI (cap 100): 30 March 2023 v United States
- T20I debut (cap 84): 17 May 2025 v Bangladesh
- Last T20I: 19 May 2025 v Bangladesh

Domestic team information
- Years: Team
- 2024-present: Abu Dhabi Knight Riders

Career statistics
Competition	ODI	LA	T20
Matches	1	2	5
Runs scored	0	1	-
Batting average	-	-	-
100s/50s	0/0	0/0	0/0
Top score	0*	1*	-
Balls bowled	30	68	13
Wickets	1	3	1
Bowling average	37.00	30.00	35.00
5 wickets in innings	0	0	0
10 wickets in match	0	0	0
Best bowling	1/37	2/53	1/17
Catches/stumpings	0/–	0/–	0/–
- Source: Cricinfo, 13 March 2024

Matiullah Khan (born 1 March 1993) is a cricketer who plays for the United Arab Emirates cricket team.

== Early life ==
In 2011, he worked as a truck driver for a transport company in UAE. His home town is Bannu, a city in Pakistan's Khyber Pakhtunkhwa province, near the Afghan border.

== Career ==
In March 2023, he was named in the UAE's squad for the 2023 Cricket World Cup Qualifier Play-off. He made his One Day International (ODI) debut on 30 March 2023, against the United States.

In July 2023, he was named in the UAE's emerging squad for the 2023 ACC Emerging Teams Asia Cup.

He made his Twenty20 debut for Abu Dhabi Knight Riders against Desert Vipers in 2024 International League T20 on 21 January 2024.
