= Abu Dhabi Knight Riders =

Cricket team in UAE's ILT20

- Nickname: Knights
- League: International League T20

Personnel
- Captain: Jason Holder
- Coach: Dwayne Bravo
- Owner: Knight Riders Group
- Chief executive: Venky Mysore
- Manager: Wayne Bentley

Team information
- City: Abu Dhabi, United Arab Emirates
- Colours: Purple and gold
- Founded: 2023; 3 years ago
- Home ground: Sheikh Zayed Cricket Stadium, Abu Dhabi
- Capacity: 20,000
- Official website: www.adkriders.com
2023 T20 kit

Knight Riders Group

Current Teams
- Kolkata Knight Riders (2008–present) 🏆×3 (2012, 2014, 2024); Trinbago Knight Riders (2015–present) 🏆×5 (2015, 2017, 2018, 2020, 2025); Trinbago Knight Riders Women (2022–present) 🏆×1 (2022); Abu Dhabi Knight Riders (2023–present); Los Angeles Knight Riders (2023–present) 🏆×1 (2026)

Stadium
- Knight Riders Cricket Ground (2026–present)

Defunct Teams
- Cape Town Knight Riders (2017)

The Abu Dhabi Knight Riders (ADKR) is a professional Twenty20 franchise cricket team that competes in the International League T20, a men's Twenty20 league hosted by the Emirates Cricket Board. The franchise is owned by the Knight Riders Group, a sporting subsidiary alliance between the Red Chillies Entertainment and the Mehta Group. Their home ground is the Sheikh Zayed Cricket Stadium in Abu Dhabi.

== History ==
In August 2022, the Emirates Cricket Board (ECB) announced the establishment of the International League T20, a Twenty20 cricket competition to be started in 2023. The teams for the competition, representing 6 different cities of United Arab Emirates, including Abu Dhabi, were put up on auction in UAE in September 2022. The Abu Dhabi franchise was purchased & revealed by Kolkata Knight Riders, part of Knight Riders Franchise. The team unveiled their logo and jersey in January 2023, through their social media handles.

== Home ground ==
The Sheikh Zayed Cricket Stadium in Abu Dhabi (with the two ends of the crease called the North End and the Pavilion End) serves as the home ground of the Abu Dhabi Knight Riders. It is operated by the Emirates Cricket Board and is the third-oldest cricket stadium in the country. It is also the second-largest stadium in the UAE in terms of crowd capacity, with over 20,000 seats. In 2021, The stadium hosted some matches of the 2021 ICC Men's T20 World Cup as the tournament was shifted to UAE after the original hosts India were unable to host the tournament due to the outbreak of second-wave of COVID-19 in the whole country. The stadium also served as the home ground for the Kolkata Knight Riders during the 2020 and 2021 editions respectively.

== Captains ==
Player	Tenure	Matches	Won	Lost	NR
Sunil Narine	2023 - 2025	32	9	22	1
Andre Russell	2024	1	1	-	-
Jason Holder	2025 - 2026	10	4	6	-

== Statistics ==
=== Standings & Season Summary ===
Season	Played	Wins	Losses	NR	League standing	Final standing
2023	10	1	8	1	6th out of 6	League Stage
2024	11	5	6	–	4th out of 6	Playoffs
2025	10	3	7	–	6th out of 6	League Stage
2026	12	5	7	–	3rd out of 6	Playoffs

=== Team statistics ===
Team	Span	Played	Won	Lost	NR
Gulf Giants	2023–	8	4	3	1
Dubai Capitals	2023–	10	2	8	—N/a
Desert Vipers	2023–	8	3	5	—N/a
MI Emirates	2023–	9	1	8	—N/a
Sharjah Warriorz	2023–	8	4	4	—N/a

== Current squad ==
Name	Nationality	Batting style	Bowling style
Batsmen
Alishan Sharafu	United Arab Emirates	Right-handed	Right-arm medium
Laurie Evans	England	Right-handed	Right-arm off break
Charith Asalanka	Sri Lanka	Left-handed	Right-arm off break
Wicket-Keepers
Michael Pepper	England	Right-handed	—N/a
Joe Clarke	England	Right-handed	—N/a
Andries Gous	United States	Right-handed	—N/a
Phil Salt	England	Right-handed	—N/a
All-rounders
Sunil Narine	West Indies	Left-handed	Right-arm off break
Jason Holder (c)	West Indies	Right-handed	Right-arm fast medium
Andre Russell	West Indies	Right-handed	Right-arm fast-medium
David Willey	England	Left-handed	Left-arm fast-medium
Kyle Mayers	West Indies	Left-handed	Right-arm medium
Roston Chase	West Indies	Right-handed	Right-arm off break
Bowlers
Ali Khan	United States	Right-handed	Right-arm fast-medium
Adhitya Shetty	United Arab Emirates	Right-handed	Right-arm leg break
Gudakesh Motie	West Indies	Left-handed	Slow left-arm orthodox
Ibrar Ahmed	United Arab Emirates	Right-handed	Right-arm fast medium
Shahid Bhutta	United Arab Emirates	Right-handed	Right-arm fast medium
Sufyan Moqim	Pakistan	Left-handed	Left-arm chinnaman
Terrance Hinds	West Indies	Right-handed	Right-arm fast medium
Vijayakanth Viyaskanth	Sri Lanka	Right-handed	Right-arm leg break

== Administration and support staff ==
Position	Name
CEO/Managing Director	Venky Mysore
Team manager	Adrian Wayne Bentley
Head coach	Dwayne Bravo
Assistant coach	Ryan ten Doeschate

== Knight Riders Group ==
- Kolkata Knight Riders
- Trinbago Knight Riders (Men's)
- Los Angeles Knight Riders
- Trinbago Knight Riders (Women's)
