= Ali Khan (American cricketer) =

American cricketer (born 1990)

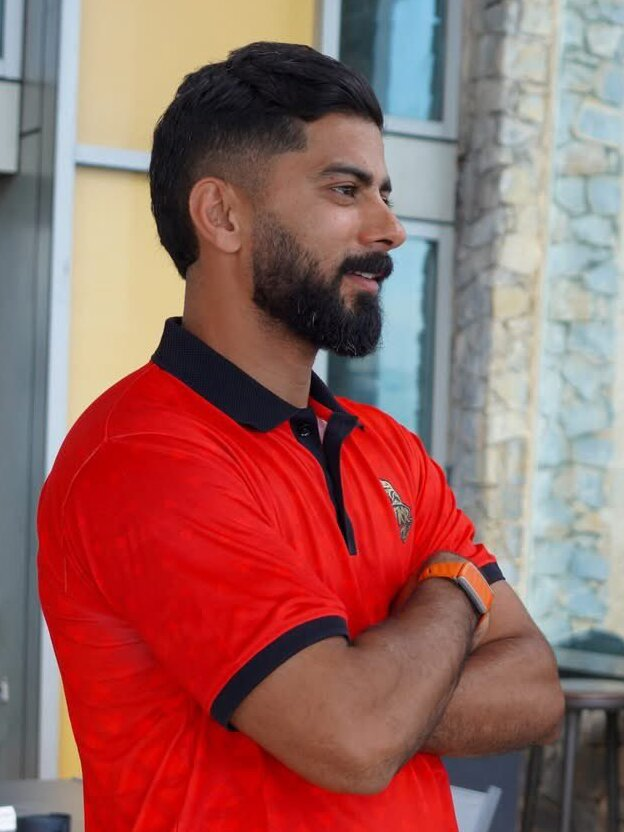
- Khan with 2024 Men's T20 World Cup

Personal information
- Full name: Mohammad Ahsan Ali Khan
- Born: December 13, 1990 (age 35); Attock, Punjab, Pakistan
- Batting: Right-handed
- Bowling: Right-arm fast-medium
- Role: Bowler

International information
- National side: United States (2019–present)
- ODI debut (cap 15): April 27, 2019 v Papua New Guinea
- Last ODI: July 6, 2023 v UAE
- T20I debut (cap 20): November 7, 2021 v Panama
- Last T20I: February 15, 2026 v Namibia

Domestic team information
- Years: Team
- 2015–2017: ICC Americas
- 2016–2017: Guyana Amazon Warriors
- 2018–present: Trinbago Knight Riders
- 2019: Khulna Titans
- 2020: Karachi Kings
- 2020: Kolkata Knight Riders
- 2021: Islamabad United
- 2024–present: Abu Dhabi Knight Riders
- 2023-present: Los Angeles Knight Riders

Career statistics
Competition	ODI	T20I	LA	T20
Matches	15	21	23	118
Runs scored	20	15	31	83
Batting average	3.33	7.50	3.87	4.88
100s/50s	0/0	0/0	0/0	0/0
Top score	6	14*	6	16*
Balls bowled	681	433	1,095	2,298
Wickets	33	18	55	110
Bowling average	16.42	34.22	16.10	31.39
5 wickets in innings	2	0	3	0
10 wickets in match	0	0	0	0
Best bowling	7/32	3/23	7/32	4/6
Catches/stumpings	2/–	3/–	4/–	21/–
- Source: ESPNCricInfo, September 26, 2026

Muhammad Ahsan Ali Khan (Note: Punjabi, Urdu: محمد احسن علی خان) (born December 13, 1990) is an American professional cricketer. He has played for the United States national cricket team since 2016 as a right-arm fast bowler. He has also played franchise Twenty20 cricket in the West Indies, Pakistan, India and the United Arab Emirates.

== Early life ==
Ali Khan was born and raised in Attock, Punjab, Pakistan. At the age of 19, his family moved to the United States, settling in Ohio. Before becoming a professional cricketer he worked as a sales representative for Cricket Wireless in Dayton, Ohio.

== International career ==
Khan made his List A debut in January 2016, playing for the ICC Americas team in the 2015–16 Regional Super50. On debut against Jamaica, he took the wickets of Devon Thomas and Aldane Thomas, finishing with 2/63 from ten overs. Khan was the only member of the ICC Americas squad to have not previously played for his national team. In July 2016 he was one of eleven uncapped players to be named for a USA selection camp ahead of the 2016 ICC World Cricket League Division Four tournament in October. He made his debut for the U.S. national team against Oman at the 2016 ICC World Cricket League Division Four tournament in Los Angeles.

In 2016, Khan suffered a major injury to his left hamstring and had limited game time over the following two years due to this and other leg injuries.

In August 2018, he was named in the United States' squad for the 2018–19 ICC World Twenty20 Americas Qualifier tournament in Morrisville, North Carolina. In October 2018, he was named in the United States' squad for the 2018 ICC World Cricket League Division Three tournament in Oman.

The International Cricket Council (ICC) named Khan as one of the five breakout stars in men's cricket in 2018 and in February 2019 he was named in the United States' Twenty20 International (T20I) squad for their series against the United Arab Emirates, but did not play due to injury concerns. The matches were the first T20I fixtures to be played by the United States cricket team.

In April 2019, he was named in the United States cricket team's squad for the 2019 ICC World Cricket League Division Two tournament in Namibia. In the United States' second match of the tournament, against hosts Namibia, Khan took his first five-wicket haul in List A cricket. He took five wickets for 63 runs from his ten overs, and was named the player of the match. The United States finished in the top four places in the tournament, therefore gaining One Day International (ODI) status. Khan made his ODI debut for the United States on April 27, 2019, against Papua New Guinea, in the tournament's third-place playoff. He was the leading wicket-taker in the tournament, with 17 dismissals in six matches.

In June 2019, he was named in a 30-man training squad for the United States cricket team, ahead of the Regional Finals of the 2018–19 ICC T20 World Cup Americas Qualifier tournament in Bermuda. Later the same month, he was selected to play for the Vancouver Knights franchise team in the 2019 Global T20 Canada tournament. In August 2019, he was named in the United States' squad for the Regional Finals of the 2018–19 ICC T20 World Cup Americas Qualifier tournament.

In October 2021, he was named in the American Twenty20 International (T20I) squad for the 2021 ICC Men's T20 World Cup Americas Qualifier tournament in Antigua. He made his T20I debut on 7 November 2021, for the United States against Panama.

In April 2023, Khan received a two-match ban from the International Cricket Council (ICC) for a Level 1 breach of the ICC Code of Conduct, in relation to a send-off of Jersey batsman Elliot Miles in the 2023 Cricket World Cup Qualifier Play-off.

In January 2026, Khan was named in USA's squad for the 2026 T20 World Cup.

== Franchise career ==
On June 3, 2018, he was selected to play for the Winnipeg Hawks in the players' draft for the inaugural edition of the Global T20 Canada tournament. In October 2018, he was named in the squad for the Khulna Titans team, following the draft for the 2018–19 Bangladesh Premier League.

During the 2020 Indian Premier League, on its 13th Season, he was picked by Kolkata Knight Riders. He was first American cricketer who was bought in IPL auction but he did not play any IPL match.

On March 15, 2020, he debuted for Karachi Kings against Quetta Gladiators and conceded 1/36 in his 3 overs.

During the 2019 Caribbean Premier League, Ali Khan was fined for an incident in the match between the Trinbago Knight Riders and St Kitts & Nevis Patriots, where he was involved in a heated exchange with batsman Evin Lewis. In July 2020, he was named in the Trinbago Knight Riders squad for the 2020 Caribbean Premier League. He was added to the Houston Hurricanes for the 2021 Minor League Cricket season.

He played for the Los Angeles Knight Riders in the inaugural season of the Major League Cricket in 2023.

In July 2026, He was drafted by Mississauga Masters for the 2026 Canada Super 60 season.
