= Waqar Salamkheil =

Afghan cricketer

Personal information
- Full name: Mohammad Waqar Salamkheil
- Born: 2 October 2001 (age 25); Kabul, Afghanistan
- Batting: Right-handed
- Bowling: Left-arm unorthodox spin
- Role: Bowler

International information
- National side: Afghanistan (2019)
- Only Test (cap 14): 15 March 2019 v Ireland

Domestic team information
- Years: Team
- 2017/18–2021/22: Band-e-Amir Dragons
- 2018: Kandahar Knights
- 2019: Comilla Victorians
- 2019: Tshwane Spartans
- 2021, 2024: Peshawar Zalmi
- 2022: Jaffna Kings
- 2023: MI Cape Town
- 2023–2024: Trinbago Knight Riders
- 2024–2025: MI Emirates
- 2024/25: Hobart Hurricanes
- 2025: St Kitts & Nevis Patriots
- 2026: Paarl Royals

Career statistics
Competition	Test	FC	LA	T20
Matches	1	12	8	101
Runs scored	1	110	3	24
Batting average	–	10.00	1.00	8.00
100s/50s	0/0	0/0	0/0	0/0
Top score	1*	29	2	7
Balls bowled	186	3,054	372	2,122
Wickets	4	74	4	133
Bowling average	25.25	24.48	73.50	21.52
5 wickets in innings	0	6	0	0
10 wickets in match	0	1	0	0
Best bowling	2/35	7/53	2/22	4/14
Catches/stumpings	0/–	9/–	3/–	9/–
- Source: Cricinfo, 23 March 2026

Mohammad Waqar Salamkheil (born 2 October 2001) is an Afghan cricketer. He made his Test cricket debut for the Afghanistan cricket team in March 2019.

== Domestic and T20 career ==
He made his first-class debut for Band-e-Amir Region in the 2017–18 Ahmad Shah Abdali 4-day Tournament on 19 November 2017, taking five wickets for 162 in the second innings. He finished the 2017–18 Ahmad Shah Abdali 4-day Tournament as the joint-leading wicket-taker, with a total of 55 wickets.

In September 2018, he was named in Kandahar's squad in the first edition of the Afghanistan Premier League tournament. He made his Twenty20 debut for Kandahar Knights in the 2018–19 Afghanistan Premier League on 6 October 2018. In October 2018, he was named in the squad for the Comilla Victorians team, following the draft for the 2018–19 Bangladesh Premier League.

In July 2019, he was selected to play for the Edinburgh Rocks in the inaugural edition of the Euro T20 Slam cricket tournament. However, the following month the tournament was cancelled, just two weeks before the tournament 's scheduled start. In September 2019, he was named in the squad for the Tshwane Spartans team for the 2019 Mzansi Super League tournament.

He made his List A debut for Band-e-Amir Region in the 2019 Ghazi Amanullah Khan Regional One Day Tournament on 10 September 2019. In September 2020, he was the joint-leading wicket-taker in the 2020 Shpageeza Cricket League, with thirteen dismissals in seven matches. In August 2021, he was selected to play for the Guyana Amazon Warriors in the 2021 Caribbean Premier League.

== International career ==
In February 2019, he was named in Afghanistan's Test squad for their one-off match against Ireland in India. He made his Test debut for Afghanistan against Ireland on 15 March 2019. In March 2021, the Afghanistan Cricket Board confirmed that he was pending selection for the Twenty20 International (T20I) matches against Zimbabwe, once his visa issues, along with the same for Mujeeb Ur Rahman, Gulbadin Naib, had been resolved.
