= James Vince =

English cricketer (born 1991)

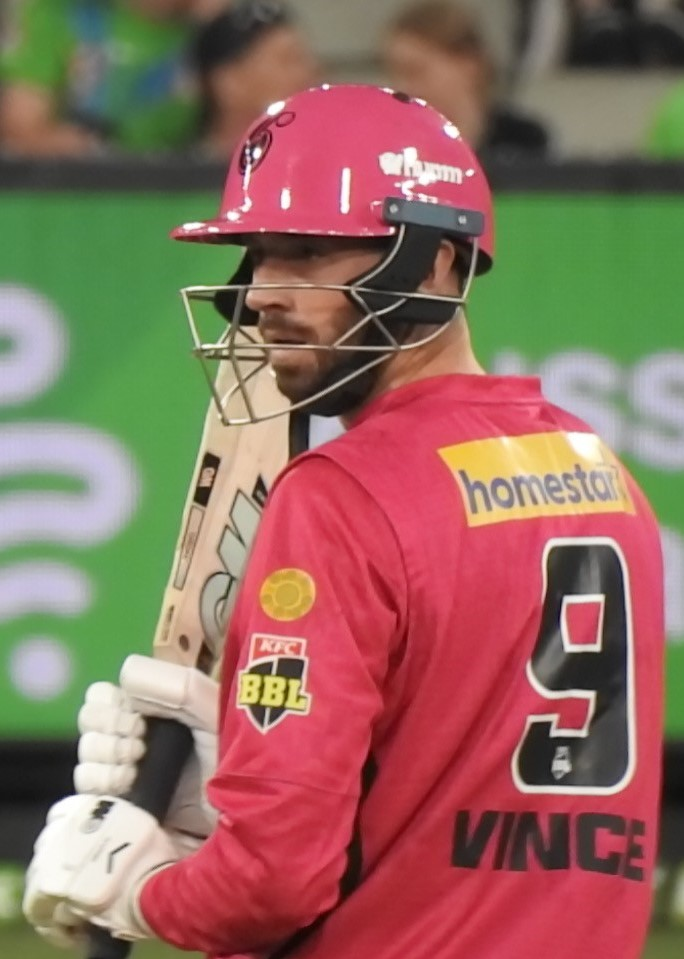
- Vince playing for Sydney Sixers, January 2023

Personal information
- Full name: James Michael Vince
- Born: 14 March 1991 (age 35); Cuckfield, West Sussex, England
- Height: 6 ft 3 in (1.91 m)
- Batting: Right-handed
- Bowling: Right-arm medium
- Role: Batter

International information
- National side: England (2015–2023)
- Test debut (cap 670): 19 May 2016 v Sri Lanka
- Last Test: 30 March 2018 v New Zealand
- ODI debut (cap 239): 8 May 2015 v Ireland
- Last ODI: 6 March 2023 v Bangladesh
- ODI shirt no.: 14
- T20I debut (cap 75): 26 November 2015 v Pakistan
- Last T20I: 30 January 2022 v West Indies
- T20I shirt no.: 14

Domestic team information
- Years: Team
- 2009–present: Hampshire (squad no. 14)
- 2016, 2023-2025: Karachi Kings
- 2016/17–2017/18: Sydney Thunder
- 2018/19: Auckland
- 2018/19–2024/25: Sydney Sixers
- 2019–2021: Multan Sultans
- 2019: Paarl Rocks
- 2021–2025: Southern Brave
- 2022: Quetta Gladiators
- 2022/23–2025/26: Gulf Giants
- 2024/25: Rangpur Riders
- 2026-present: Joburg Super Kings
- 2026-present: Peshawar Zalmi
- 2026-present: MI London
- 2026-present: Dublin Guardians
- 2026-present: Sharjah Warriorz

Career statistics
| Competition | Test | ODI | FC | LA |
|---|---|---|---|---|
| Matches | 13 | 25 | 216 | 148 |
| Runs scored | 548 | 616 | 13,340 | 5,199 |
| Batting average | 24.90 | 28.00 | 40.18 | 39.68 |
| 100s/50s | 0/3 | 1/3 | 30/58 | 10/25 |
| Top score | 83 | 102 | 240 | 190 |
| Balls bowled | 24 | 42 | 1,778 | 174 |
| Wickets | 0 | 1 | 24 | 3 |
| Bowling average | – | 38.00 | 47.54 | 54.00 |
| 5 wickets in innings | – | 0 | 1 | 0 |
| 10 wickets in match | – | 0 | 0 | 0 |
| Best bowling | – | 1/18 | 5/41 | 1/18 |
| Catches/stumpings | 8/– | 10/– | 211/– | 57/– |
Medal record
Men's Cricket
Representing England
ICC Cricket World Cup
| Winner | 2019 England and Wales |
ICC T20 World Cup
| Runner-up | 2016 India |
- Source: ESPNcricinfo, 28 September 2024

James Michael Vince (born 14 March 1991) is an English cricketer who plays for Hampshire County Cricket Club in T20 cricket and plays for the England cricket team.

He captained Hampshire in all formats until he declared his retirement from red ball cricket in 2025. Vince was part of the England squad that won the 2019 Cricket World Cup. He is a right-handed middle-order batter who is also a right-arm medium pace bowler. He made his international debut for England in May 2015.

== Early life and domestic career ==
Vince was educated at Warminster School in Wiltshire. While at school, he played football for Reading Academy for three years and from the age of sixteen played for Trowbridge Town F.C. On leaving school, he pursued a career as a professional cricketer.

After graduating from Hampshire's cricket academy, Vince signed a one-year deal with the club at the start of 2009. He made his Championship debut on 11 June 2009 against Nottinghamshire County Cricket Club. His batting performances earned him a call-up to the England under-19 team for a Test match series against Bangladesh.

According to Duncan Fletcher, who acted as a consultant for Hampshire and was the former coach of the England team, Vince is reminiscent of former England batsman Michael Vaughan.

Following the retirement of John Crawley during the 2009 season, Vince was a regular for Hampshire in all forms of the game. He was a member of Hampshire's 2010 Friends Provident t20 winning team which defeated Somerset. Vince scored his maiden first-class century in a county championship against Yorkshire, scoring 180 runs in a 278 run stand with James Adams, which is the county's fourth highest partnership in first-class cricket.

He announced his retirement from red ball cricket in 2025.

Vince relocated to Dubai after attacks on his family home in mid 2024.

== International career ==
Vince made his One Day International debut for England against Ireland on 8 May 2015, and his Twenty20 International debut against Pakistan on 26 November 2015. He scored 41 in the first game of the T20I series as England won by 14 runs, and then scored 38 in the second as England won again. Vince scored 46 in the final game as the scores finished tied and England won the Super Over. Vince was named man of the series after his contributions in all three games. He played one game in the 2016 World T20, replacing the injured Alex Hales for the match against Afghanistan. Vince scored 22 and England won the match.

In May 2016, Vince was named in the Test squad for Sri Lanka's tour of England, and won his first Test cap in the first Test at Headingley. However, in his first innings, he only scored 9 runs. In the second Test, Vince scored 35 in England's first innings, and was not required to bat in the second as England won by nine wickets. Vince played in the third and final Test of the series, scoring ten in the first innings before being dismissed for a duck in the second innings, as the match ended in a draw. He played in the final ODI match of the series, replacing the injured Alex Hales, and scored 51, helping England to reach 324 and win the match by 122 runs. He scored 16 in the only T20I match between the teams, which England won by eight wickets.

Vince kept his place for the Test series against Pakistan, and made 16 in the first innings of the first Test. He was dismissed for 42 in the second innings as England lost by 75 runs. In the second Test, he made 18 as England made 589/8 in their first innings and won the match by 330 runs. In the third Test, Vince made 39 in England's first innings and followed this up with 42 in their second innings to help England reach 445/6 and secure victory by a margin of 141 runs. Vince struggled in the final Test, making one in the first innings and being dismissed for a duck in the second innings as England lost by 10 wickets.

Vince scored 16 in the first ODI against Bangladesh, as England won by 21 runs. In the second match, he made 5 as England lost and Bangladesh levelled the series at 1-1. Vince made his highest score in the final match of the series, scoring 32 as England chased down Bangladesh's target of 278 to win the series 2–1.

On 21 May 2019, England finalised their squad for the 2019 Cricket World Cup, with Vince named in the 15 man squad. On 29 May 2020, Vince was named in a 55-man group of players to begin training ahead of international fixtures starting in England following the COVID-19 pandemic. On 9 July 2020, Vince was included in England's 24-man squad to start training behind closed doors for the ODI series against Ireland. On 27 July 2020, Vince was named in England's squad for the ODI series. In the second match, Vince took his first wicket in an ODI match, when he dismissed Ireland's captain Andrew Balbirnie.

In July 2021, in the third match against Pakistan, Vince scored his first century in ODI cricket, with 102 runs. England won the game by three wickets, with Vince named the player of the match. In September 2021, Vince was named as one of three travelling reserves in England's squad for the 2021 ICC Men's T20 World Cup.

== Franchise cricket ==
Vince has played for a number of teams in overseas T20 competitions, including the Pakistan Super League, Australian Big Bash League, New Zealand's Super Smash and South Arica's Mzansi Super League.

=== Pakistan Super League ===
In December 2015, Vince was selected by Karachi Kings and on 5 February 2016, he debuted for Karachi against Lahore Qalandars. For the 2019 Pakistan Super League, Vince was signed by Multan Sultans. In December 2019, he was retained by Multan Sultans and was assigned as a team ambassador.

=== Big Bash League ===
In 2016, Vince made his BBL debut for Sydney Thunder. He spent two seasons there before joining local rivals Sydney Sixers for their title winning 2019–20 Big Bash League season. The following season, Vince was again part of Sydney's title-winning team, scoring 95 runs in the final.

=== The Hundred ===
In 2021, he was drafted by Southern Brave for the inaugural season of The Hundred. He was also given the captaincy and under his leadership, Southern Brave won the first title of 'The Hundred' by beating Birmingham Phoenix in the finals. He was the highest run scorer for Southern Brave, scoring 229 runs in 10 matches. In April 2022, he was retained by the Southern Brave for the 2022 season of The Hundred.

== Career best performances ==
| | Batting | | | |
| | Score | Fixture | Venue | Season |
|---|---|---|---|---|
| Test | 83 | England v Australia | The Gabba, Brisbane | 2017/18 |
| ODI | 102 | England v Pakistan | Edgbaston Cricket Ground, Birmingham | 2021 |
| T20I | 59 | New Zealand v England | Hagley Oval, Christchurch | 2019/20 |
| FC | 240 | Hampshire v Essex | The Rose Bowl, Southampton | 2014 |
| LA | 190 | Hampshire v Gloucestershire | The Rose Bowl, Southampton | 2019 |
| T20 | 129* | Somerset v Hampshire | County Ground, Taunton | 2022 |

Sporting positions
| Preceded by James Adams | Hampshire County Captain; 2015 to date | Succeeded by Incumbent (T20); Ben Brown (first-class); Nick Gubbins (one-day) |
