= MI Emirates =

Professional UAE Twenty20 cricket team

- Nickname: Abu Dhabi Emirates
- League: International League T20

Personnel
- Captain: Nicholas Pooran
- Coach: Mark Boucher
- Owner: Reliance Industries
- Manager: Mukesh Ambani

Team information
- City: Abu Dhabi
- Colours: Blue and Gold
- Founded: 2023; 3 years ago
- Home ground: Sheikh Zayed Cricket Stadium, Abu Dhabi
- Capacity: 20,000

History
- Twenty20 debut: v. Sharjah Warriors at Sheikh Zayed Cricket Stadium, Abu Dhabi; 14 January 2023
- ILT20 wins: 1 (2024)
- Official website: miemirates.com

The MI Emirates is a professional Twenty20 franchise cricket team based in Abu Dhabi that competes in the UAE's International League T20. The franchise is owned by the Indiawin Sports.

== History ==
In August 2022, the Emirates Cricket Board (ECB) announced the establishment of the International League T20, a Twenty20 Cricket competition to be started in 2023. The teams for the competition, representing 6 different cities of United Arab Emirates, including MI Emirates, were put up on auction in UAE in September 2022. The franchise that purchased was revealed that Indiawin Sports, led by Reliance Industries, will be owning a team in the league. The team unveiled their logo and jersey in January 2023 through their social media handles.

== Seasons ==
Year	League standing	Final standing
2023	3rd	Playoffs
2024	1st	Champions
2025	2nd	Runner ups

== Current squad ==
- Players with international caps are listed in **bold**.

No.	Name	Nationally	Birth date	Batting style	Bowling style	Notes
Batters
5	**Ambati Rayudu**	India	23 September 1985 (age 41)	Right-Handed	Right-arm off spin	
10	**Muhammed Waseem**	United Arab Emirates	12 February 1996 (age 30)	Right-Handed	Right-arm medium	
11	**Asif Khan**	United Arab Emirates	15 February 1990 (age 36)	Right-Handed	Right-arm off spin	
23	Will Smeed	England	26 October 2001 (age 25)	Right-Handed	Right-arm off break	
All-rounders
15	Muhammad Rohid Khan	United Arab Emirates	29 September 2002 (age 24)	Left-Handed	Left-arm medium-fast	
21	**Akeal Hosein**	West Indies	25 April 1993 (age 33)	Left-Handed	Left-arm orthodox	
44	Jordan Thompson	England	9 October 1996 (age 30)	Left-Handed	Right-arm medium-fast	
47	**Dwayne Bravo**	West Indies	3 October 1983 (age 43)	Right-Handed	Right-arm medium-fast	
55	**Kieron Pollard**	West Indies	12 May 1987 (age 39)	Right-Handed	Right-arm medium	
58	**Odean Smith**	West Indies	1 November 1996 (age 30)	Right-Handed	Left-arm orthodox	
64	**Nosthush Kenjige**	United States	1 March 1991 (age 35)	Right-Handed	Left-arm orthodox	
78	**Corey Anderson**	United States	13 December 1990 (age 35)	Left-Handed	Left-arm medium	
80	**Dan Mousley**	England	8 July 2001 (age 25)	Left-Handed	Right-arm off break	
Wicket-keepers
29	**Nicholas Pooran**	West Indies	2 October 1995 (age 31)	Left-Handed	Right-arm off spin	Captain
54	**Kusal Perera**	Sri Lanka	17 August 1990 (age 36)	Left-Handed	Right-arm medium	
72	**Andre Fletcher**	West Indies	28 November 1987 (age 38)	Right-Handed	Right-arm medium fast	
Bowlers
18	**Trent Boult**	New Zealand	22 July 1989 (age 37)	Right-Handed	Left-arm fast medium	
16	**Zahoor Khan**	United Arab Emirates	25 May 1989 (age 37)	Right-Handed	Right-arm fast medium	
19	**Waqar Salamkheil**	Afghanistan	2 October 2001 (age 25)	Right-Handed	Left-arm unorthodox spin	
55	**Vijayakanth Viyaskanth**	Sri Lanka	5 December 2001 (age 24)	Right-Handed	Right-arm wrist spin	
66	McKenny Clarke	West Indies	5 June 2003 (age 23)	Right-Handed	Right-arm fast medium	
83	**Fazalhaq Farooqi**	Afghanistan	22 September 2000 (age 26)	Right-Handed	Left-arm fast medium	

== Administration and support staff ==
Position	Name
Head coach	Mark Boucher
Assistant coach	Colin Ingram
Bowling coach	Paras Mhambrey
Fielding coach	T.Dilip

== Honours ==
- Champions:
  - 2024

== Affiliated teams ==
- Mumbai Indians
- MI New York
- MI Cape Town
- Mumbai Indians (WPL)
