= Dubai Capitals =

Twenty20 Cricket team

- League: International League T20

Personnel
- Captain: Sam Billings
- Coach: Hemang Badani
- Chairman: Kiran Kumar Grandhi
- Bowling coach: Glen Chapple
- Owner: GMR Group

Team information
- City: Dubai, United Arab Emirates
- Colors: Blue and red
- Founded: 2023; 3 years ago
- Home ground: Dubai International Cricket Stadium, Dubai
- Capacity: 25,000

History
- Twenty20 debut: v. Abu Dhabi Knight Riders at Dubai International Cricket Stadium, Dubai; 13 January 2023
- ILT20 wins: (2025)
- Global Super League wins: 0
- Official website: https://www.gmrsports.in/dubai-capitals
- Dubai Capitals in 2026

Capitals Group

Current teams
- Delhi Capitals (2008–present); Delhi Capitals (WPL) (2023–present); Dubai Capitals (2023–present); X 1 (2025); Pretoria Capitals (2022–present); India Capitals; X 1 (2022)

Defunct teams
- Joburg Giants (2017)

Dubai Capitals is a Twenty20 franchise cricket team based in Dubai, United Arab Emirates that competes in the International League T20 tournament since 2023. The team's home ground is the Dubai International Cricket Stadium. The team is coached by Hemang Badani. The franchise is owned by the GMR Group.

== History ==
In August 2022, the Emirates Cricket Board (ECB) announced the establishment of the International League T20, a Twenty20 Cricket competition to be started in 2023. The teams for the competition, representing 6 different cities of the United Arab Emirates, including Dubai, were put up for auction in UAE in September 2022. The Dubai franchise was purchased was revealed that Delhi Capitals, led by JSW Group will be owning a team in the league. The team unveiled their logo and jersey in January 2023, through their social media handles.

== Seasons ==
Year	League standing	Final standing
2023	4th out of 6	Playoffs (E1)
2024	4th out of 6	Runners Up
2025	2nd out of 6	Champions

- C: champions
- RU: runner-up
- SF team qualified for the semi-final stage of the competition

=== Season summary ===
Year	Played	Wins	Losses	Tied/NR
2023	10	0	0	0
Source: ESPNCricinfo

Note:

- NR indicates No result.
- Abandoned matches are indicated as no result.
- Source: Dubai Capitals

== Current squad ==
- Players with international caps are listed in **bold**

No.	Name	Nationality	Birth date	Batting style	Bowling style	Notes					
Batsmen
31	**David Warner**	Australia	27 October 1986 (age 40)	Left-handed	Right-arm leg break	24	**Rahul Bhatia**	United Arab Emirates	24 November 1998 (age 27)	Left-handed	Slow left-arm orthodox
4	Max Holden	England	18 December 1997 (age 28)	Left-handed	Right-arm off break						
52	**Rovman Powell**	West Indies	23 July 1993 (age 33)	Right-handed	Right-arm fast-medium						
66	**Joe Root**	England	30 December 1990 (age 35)	Right-handed	Right-arm off break						
All-rounders
9	Mohammad Mohsin	United States	15 April 1996 (age 30)	Left-handed	Left-arm leg break googly						
52	**Roelof van der Merwe**	Netherlands	31 December 1984 (age 41)	Right-handed	Slow left-arm orthodox						
24	**Sikandar Raza**	Zimbabwe	24 April 1986 (age 40)	Right-handed	Right-arm off spin						
7	**Dasun Shanaka**	Sri Lanka	9 September 1991 (age 35)	Right-handed	Right-arm fast-medium						
28	Tom Abell	England	5 March 1994 (age 32)	Right-handed	Right-arm fast-medium						
Wicketkeepers
33	**Vriitya Aravind**	United Arab Emirates	11 June 2002 (age 24)	Right-handed	—						
33	**Rahul Chopra**	United Arab Emirates	7 November 1994 (age 32)	Right-handed	—						
7	**Sam Billings**	England	15 June 1991 (age 35)	Right-handed	—						
51	**Ben Dunk**	Australia	11 March 1987 (age 39)	Right-handed	Right-arm off break						
21	**Rahmanullah Gurbaz**	Afghanistan	28 November 2001 (age 24)	Right-handed	Right-arm medium fast						
50	**Sadeera Samarawickrama**	Sri Lanka	30 August 1995 (age 31)	Right-handed	—						
98	**Tom Banton**	England	11 November 1998 (age 28)	Right-handed	—						
Bowlers
5	**Dushmanta Chameera**	Sri Lanka	11 January 1992 (age 34)	Right-handed	Right-arm fast						
8	**Jason Holder**	West Indies	5 November 1991 (age 35)	Right-handed	Right-arm fast-medium	Overseas					
70	**Shamar Joseph**	West Indies	31 August 1999 (age 27)	Left-handed	Right-arm fast-medium						
46	**Akif Raja**	United Arab Emirates	24 November 1992 (age 33)	Left-handed	Right-arm medium-fast						
35	**Nuwan Thushara**	Sri Lanka	6 August 1994 (age 32)	Right-handed	Right-arm medium-fast						
68	**Andrew Tye**	Australia	12 December 1986 (age 39)	Right-handed	Right-arm medium-fast						
33	**Mark Wood**	England	11 January 1990 (age 36)	Right-handed	Right-arm fast						

== Administration and support staff ==
Position	Name
Head coach	Hemang Badani
Batting coach	Ross Taylor
Fielding coach	Gnaneswara Rao
Bowling coach	Lasith Malinga

== Honours ==
- Champion: 1
  - 2025
- Runners-up:
  - 2024

== Kit manufacturers and sponsors ==
Season	Kit manufacturer	Shirt sponsor (front)	Shirt sponsor (back)	Chest branding
2023		Atithya	1xBet	GMR Group
2024	GMR and Life Nstyle	GMR Group	Life Nstyle	Yolo
2025		Tamaska		GMR Group
2025–26	Vany Sports Wear	FUN88	Enclam	S&V Group, GMR Group
