= Emirates Cricket Board =

Cricket Board of United Arab Emirates

- Sport: Cricket
- Jurisdiction: United Arab Emirates
- Abbreviation: ECB
- Founded: 1936; 90 years ago
- Affiliation: International Cricket Council
- Affiliation date: 1990; 36 years ago
- Regional affiliation: Asian Cricket Council
- Affiliation date: 1990; 36 years ago
- Headquarters: Abu Dhabi, United Arab Emirates
- Location: Abu Dhabi, United Arab Emirates
- Chairman: Sheikh Nahayan Mabarak Al Nahyan
- Chairperson: Khalid Al Zarooni
- Secretary: Mubashshir Usmani

Official website
- emiratescricket.com
- (United Arab Emirates)

Emirates Cricket Board is the governing body of cricket in the United Arab Emirates. It is the United Arab Emirates' representative at the International Cricket Council and is an Associate Member and has been a Member of that body since 1990. It is also a Member of the Asian Cricket Council.

On 21 July 2016, UAE cricket took a step towards "full professionalism", with the Emirates Cricket Board granting two-year central contracts to eight of its players.

In June 2018, ECB announced the first ever T20 franchise league in UAE, scheduled to start later that year after the T10 tournament.

In August 2022, the board unveiled a new T20 tournament, known as the International League T20 or ILT20.

== See also ==
- United Arab Emirates national cricket team
- United Arab Emirates women's national cricket team
