= Sharjah Warriorz =

Emirati Twenty20 cricket team

Sharjah Warriors
- League: International League T20

Personnel
- Captain: Tim Southee
- Coach: Adrian Birrell
- Owner: Capri Global

Team information
- City: Sharjah, United Arab Emirates
- Founded: 2023; 3 years ago
- Home ground: Sharjah Cricket Stadium

History
- ILT20 wins: 0

Sharjah Warriorz (founded as Sharjah Warriors) is a professional Twenty20 franchise cricket team that plays in the International League T20 (ILT20), in the United Arab Emirates. It was one of the six teams that were announced for the inaugural season of the tournament. Founded in 2022, the team is owned by Capri Global.

The team is captained by Tim Southee, and coached by Johan Botha. The team's batting coach is JP Duminy.

== History ==
In August 2022, the Emirates Cricket Board (ECB) announced the establishment of the International League T20, a Twenty20 Cricket competition to be started in 2023. Six teams were announced for the competition, the team building took place in an auction held in UAE in September 2022. In August 2022, it was announced that Capri Global would be the owners of a team based in Sharjah.

== Current squad ==
- Players with international caps are listed in **bold**.

Name	Nationality	Birth date	Batting style	Bowling style	Year signed	Notes
Batsmen
**Avishka Fernando**	Sri Lanka	5 April 1998 (age 28)	Right-handed	Right-arm medium-fast	2025	
**Bhanuka Rajapaksa**	Sri Lanka	24 October 1991 (age 34)	Left-handed	Right-arm medium	2025	
**Ethan D'Souza**	United Arab Emirates	17 March 2006 (age 20)	Left-handed	Right-arm off-break	2025	
**Jason Roy**	England	21 July 1990 (age 36)	Right-handed	—N/a	2025	
**Rohan Mustafa**	United Arab Emirates	7 October 1988 (age 37)	Left-handed	Right-arm off-break	2025	
All-rounders
**Daniel Sams**	Australia	27 October 1992 (age 33)	Right-handed	Left-arm fast-medium	2024	
**Harmeet Singh Baddhan**	United States	7 September 1992 (age 34)	Left-handed	Slow left-arm orthodox	2025	
**Karim Janat**	Afghanistan	11 August 1998 (age 28)	Right-handed	Right-arm medium	2025	
**Keemo Paul**	West Indies	21 February 1998 (age 28)	Right-handed	Right-arm fast-medium	2025	
**Virandeep Singh**	Malaysia	23 March 1999 (age 27)	Right-handed	Slow left-arm orthodox	2025	
Wicket-keepers
**Johnson Charles**	West Indies	14 January 1989 (age 37)	Right-handed	Slow left-arm orthodox	2024	
**Kusal Mendis**	Sri Lanka	2 February 1995 (age 31)	Right-handed	Right-arm leg spin	2024	
**Matthew Wade**	Australia	26 December 1987 (age 38)	Left-handed	Right-arm medium	2025	
**Tim Seifert**	New Zealand	14 December 1994 (age 31)	Right-handed	—N/a	2025	
Tom Kohler-Cadmore	England	19 August 1994 (age 32)	Right-handed	Right-arm off-break	2023	
Spin bowlers
**Adil Rashid**	England	17 February 1988 (age 38)	Right-handed	Right-arm leg-break	2025	
**Ashton Agar**	Australia	14 October 1993 (age 32)	Left-handed	Slow left-arm orthodox	2025	
**Maheesh Theekshana**	Sri Lanka	1 August 2000 (age 26)	Right-handed	Right-arm off-break	2024	
Peter Hatzoglou	Australia	27 November 1998 (age 27)	Right-handed	Right-arm leg-break	2025	
Traveen Mathew	Sri Lanka	14 June 2004 (age 22)	Right-handed	Right-arm off-break	2025	
Pace bowlers
**Adam Milne**	New Zealand	13 April 1992 (age 34)	Right-handed	Right-arm fast	2025	
**Dilshan Madushanka**	Sri Lanka	18 September 2000 (age 26)	Right-handed	Left-arm fast-medium	2024	
**Gus Atkinson**	England	19 January 1998 (age 28)	Right-handed	Right-arm fast-medium	2025	
**Junaid Siddique**	United Arab Emirates	6 December 1992 (age 33)	Right-handed	Right-arm medium-fast	2023	
**Muhammad Jawadullah**	United Arab Emirates	12 March 1999 (age 27)	Left-handed	Left-arm fast-medium	2023	
**Tim Southee**	New Zealand	11 December 1988 (age 37)	Right-handed	Right-arm medium-fast	2025	

== Statistics and seasons ==
Year	Played	Wins	Losses	Tied/NR
2023	10	3	6	1
2024	10	4	6	0
2025	12	6	6	0
Source: ESPNCricinfo

Note:

- NR indicates No result.
- Abandoned matches are indicated as no result.

=== Seasons ===
Year	League standing	Final standing
2023	5th out of 5	5th Place
2024	6th out of 6	6th Place
2025	4th out of 4	Playoffs

== Administration and support staff ==
Position	Name	Ref.
Head coach	Adrian Birrell	
Batting coach	Grant Flower	
Fielding & assistant coach	Ian Westwood	
Team director	Ramakrishnan Sridhar	

=== Coaching history ===
Season	Head coach
2023	Paul Farbrace
2024	Johan Botha
2025	JP Duminy
2026-present	Adrian Birrell
