= New Zealand cricket team in England in 2015 =

International cricket tour

New Zealand in England in 2015
	England	New Zealand
- Dates: 8 May – 23 June 2015
Captains	Alastair Cook (Tests); Eoin Morgan (ODIs and T20I)	Brendon McCullum

Test series
- Result: 2-match series drawn 1–1
Most runs	Alastair Cook (309)	BJ Watling (254)
Most wickets	Stuart Broad (13)	Trent Boult (13)
- Player of the series: Alastair Cook (Eng) and Trent Boult (NZ)

One Day International series
- Results: England won the 5-match series 3–2
Most runs	Eoin Morgan (322)	Kane Williamson (396)
Most wickets	Ben Stokes (9)	Mitchell Santner (7)
- Player of the series: Kane Williamson (NZ)

Twenty20 International series
- Results: England won the 1-match series 1–0
Most runs	Joe Root (68)	Kane Williamson (57)
Most wickets	David Willey (3); Mark Wood (3)	Mitchell Santner (2); Mitchell McClenaghan (2)
- Player of the series: Joe Root (Eng)

The New Zealand national cricket team toured England from 8 May to 23 June 2015 for two Test matches, five One Day Internationals (ODIs) and a Twenty20 International (T20I) against the England cricket team. They also played two four-day tour matches and a one-day match against English county sides. England won the first Test at Lord's before New Zealand claimed victory in the second Test at Headingley to level the series. England then took an early lead in the ODI series after hitting more than 400 runs for the first time in their history in the first ODI at Edgbaston, before New Zealand reclaimed the lead with successive wins at The Oval and the Rose Bowl, only for England to mount successful run chases in the last two ODIs at Trent Bridge and the Riverside Ground to claim the series 3–2. England then won the only T20I at Old Trafford by 56 runs.

== Squads ==
Tests		ODIs		T20I	
England	New Zealand	England	New Zealand	England	New Zealand
Alastair Cook (c); Moeen Ali; James Anderson; Gary Ballance; Ian Bell; Stuart Broad; Jos Buttler (wk); Chris Jordan; Adam Lyth; Liam Plunkett†; Joe Root; Ben Stokes; Mark Wood	Brendon McCullum (c); Corey Anderson; Trent Boult; Doug Bracewell; Mark Craig; Martin Guptill; Matt Henry; Tom Latham (wk); Luke Ronchi (wk); Hamish Rutherford; Tim Southee; Ross Taylor; Neil Wagner; BJ Watling (wk); Kane Williamson	Eoin Morgan (c); Jonny Bairstow (wk) $; Sam Billings (wk); Jos Buttler (wk) $; Steven Finn; Alex Hales; Chris Jordan ‡; Craig Overton ‡; Jamie Overton ‡; Liam Plunkett ‡; Adil Rashid; Joe Root; Jason Roy; Ben Stokes; James Taylor; David Willey; Mark Wood	Brendon McCullum (c); Corey Anderson; Trent Boult; Grant Elliott; Martin Guptill; Matt Henry; Tom Latham (wk); Andrew Mathieson; Mitchell McClenaghan; Nathan McCullum; Adam Milne±; Luke Ronchi (wk); Mitchell Santner; Tim Southee; Ross Taylor; Ben Wheeler; Kane Williamson	Eoin Morgan (c); Sam Billings (wk); Jos Buttler (wk); Steven Finn; Alex Hales; Adil Rashid; Joe Root; Jason Roy; Ben Stokes; Reece Topley; James Vince; David Willey; Mark Wood	Brendon McCullum (c); Corey Anderson; Trent Boult ‡; Grant Elliott; Martin Guptill; Matt Henry; Tom Latham (wk); Mitchell McClenaghan; Nathan McCullum; Adam Milne±; Luke Ronchi (wk); Mitchell Santner; Tim Southee; Ross Taylor; Kane Williamson

± Adam Milne withdrew from the squad due to injury and was replaced by Ben Wheeler.
†Liam Plunkett was called up for the 2nd Test.
‡ After the second ODI, Chris Jordan and Liam Plunkett withdrew from the ODI series, and were replaced by Craig and Jamie Overton. Trent Boult also withdrew due to injury and was replaced by Andrew Mathieson.
$ Jos Buttler was ruled out of the last ODI, and replaced by Jonny Bairstow.

== Tour matches ==
=== First-class: Somerset vs New Zealanders ===
8–11 May 2015
Scorecard

New Zealanders	v	Somerset
237 (71.1 overs); BJ Watling 65 (125); Tim Groenewald 4/71 (22 overs)		204 (46.5 overs); Peter Trego 40 (46); Ben Wheeler 5/18 (11 overs)
310 (87.5 overs); Mitchell Santner 94 (151); Tim Groenewald 5/65 (18.5 overs)		277 (66.5 overs); James Hildreth 115 (135); Mark Craig 5/34 (11.5 overs)

New Zealanders won by 66 runs
County Ground, Taunton
Umpires: Neil Bainton and Steve O'Shaughnessy

- Somerset won the toss and elected to field.

=== Four-day: Worcestershire vs New Zealanders ===
14–17 May 2015
Scorecard

New Zealanders	v	Worcestershire
261/9d (71.4 overs); Hamish Rutherford 75 (140); Ross Whiteley 2/16 (9 overs)		291/7d (94 overs); Ross Whiteley 103* (176); Neil Wagner 2/17 (14 overs)
275/9d (72 overs); Martin Guptill 150 (210); Shaaiq Choudhry 5/78 (18 overs)		230 (47.2 overs); Tom Kohler-Cadmore 55 (71); Mark Craig 4/56 (12 overs)

New Zealanders won by 15 runs
New Road, Worcester
Umpires: Mike Burns and Alex Wharf

- New Zealanders won the toss and elected to bat.
- No play was possible on day 1 due to rain.
- Both teams were able to name up to 15 players in their squad (11 batting, 11 fielding).

=== List A: Leicestershire Foxes vs New Zealanders ===
6 June 2015
10:30
Scorecard

New Zealanders; 373/5 (50 overs)	v	Leicestershire Foxes; 175 (42.3 overs)
Luke Ronchi 106* (76); Atif Sheikh 3/49 (9 overs)		Angus Robson 67 (97); Mitchell McClenaghan 4/31 (9.3 overs)

New Zealanders won by 198 runs
Grace Road, Leicester
Umpires: Martin Saggers and Chris Watts

- New Zealanders won the toss and elected to bat.
- Aadil Ali, Rob Sayer and Atif Sheikh (all Leics) made their List A debuts.

== Test series ==
=== 1st Test ===
21–25 May 2015
Scorecard

England	v	New Zealand
389 (100.5 overs); Joe Root 98 (161); Trent Boult 4/79 (29 overs)		523 (131.2 overs); Kane Williamson 132 (262); Stuart Broad 3/77 (26.2 overs)
478 (129 overs); Alastair Cook 162 (345); Trent Boult 5/85 (34 overs)		220 (67.3 overs); Corey Anderson 67 (87); Ben Stokes 3/38 (11 overs)

England won by 124 runs
Lord's, London
Umpires: Marais Erasmus (SA) and Sundaram Ravi (Ind)
Player of the match: Ben Stokes (Eng)

- New Zealand won the toss and elected to field.
- Adam Lyth, Mark Wood (both Eng) and Matt Henry (NZ) made their Test debuts.
- The match was the 100th Test between the two sides.
- A total of 1,610 runs were scored, a record for a Test match played at Lord's.

=== 2nd Test ===
29 May–2 June 2015
Scorecard

New Zealand	v	England
350 (72.1 overs); Luke Ronchi 88 (70); Stuart Broad 5/109 (17.1 overs)		350 (108.2 overs); Adam Lyth 107 (212); Tim Southee 4/83 (30 overs)
454/8d (91 overs); BJ Watling 120 (163); Mark Wood 3/97 (19 overs)		255 (91.5 overs); Jos Buttler 73 (147); Kane Williamson 3/15 (7 overs)

New Zealand won by 199 runs
Headingley, Leeds
Umpires: Sundaram Ravi (Ind) and Rod Tucker (Aus)
Player of the match: BJ Watling (NZ)

- England won the toss and elected to field.
- Play on day 1 was delayed until after lunch due to rain.
- Play on day 3 was delayed until 11:15 due to rain.
- Play on day 4 was stopped at 1:55 due to rain.
- Luke Ronchi (NZ) made his Test debut.
- James Anderson (Eng) took his 400th Test wicket in this match.
- Alastair Cook (Eng) became England's leading run scorer in Test matches, as well as the first England player to score 9,000 runs in Tests and the first to score 1,000 Test runs against five different nations.
- Adam Lyth (Eng) scored his maiden Test match century.

== ODI series ==
=== 1st ODI ===
9 June 2015
14:00 (D/N)
Scorecard

England; 408/9 (50 overs)	v	New Zealand; 198 (31.1 overs)
Jos Buttler 129 (77); Trent Boult 4/55 (10 overs)		Ross Taylor 57 (54); Steven Finn 4/35 (7 overs)

England won by 210 runs
Edgbaston, Birmingham
Umpires: Michael Gough (Eng) and Bruce Oxenford (Aus)
Player of the match: Jos Buttler (Eng)

- New Zealand won the toss and elected to field.
- Sam Billings (Eng) and Mitchell Santner (NZ) made their ODI debuts.
- Jos Buttler (Eng) scored 129, his highest in ODIs.
- England's score of 408 was their first score of more than 400 in ODIs.
- England's winning margin of 210 runs was the most for England in ODIs.

=== 2nd ODI ===
12 June 2015
13:00 (D/N)
Scorecard

New Zealand; 398/5 (50 overs)	v	England; 365/9 (46 overs)
Ross Taylor 119* (96); Ben Stokes 2/66 (9 overs)		Eoin Morgan 88 (47); Nathan McCullum 3/86 (9 overs)

New Zealand won by 13 runs (DLS method)
The Oval, London
Umpires: Steve Davis (Aus) and Tim Robinson (Eng)
Player of the match: Ross Taylor (NZ)

- New Zealand won the toss and elected to bat.
- England's innings was reduced to 46 overs with a target of 379 due to rain.
- This was the highest aggregate ODI score in England, and the third highest aggregate ODI score overall.

=== 3rd ODI ===
14 June 2015
10:30
Scorecard

England; 302 (45.2 overs)	v	New Zealand; 306/7 (49 overs)
Eoin Morgan 71 (82); Tim Southee 3/44 (8.2 overs)		Kane Williamson 118 (113); David Willey 3/69 (10 overs)

New Zealand won by 3 wickets
Rose Bowl, Southampton
Umpires: Bruce Oxenford (Aus) and Tim Robinson (Eng)
Player of the match: Kane Williamson (NZ)

- England won the toss and elected to bat.
- Ben Wheeler (NZ) made his ODI debut.
- This was the first time that England made three consecutive scores of more than 300 in ODIs.
- Ross Taylor and Kane Williamson's partnership of 206 is the highest third-wicket stand for New Zealand in ODIs.

=== 4th ODI ===
17 June 2015
14:00 (D/N)
Scorecard

New Zealand; 349/7 (50 overs)	v	England; 350/3 (44 overs)
Kane Williamson 90 (70); Ben Stokes 2/73 (10 overs)		Eoin Morgan 113 (82); Matt Henry 2/77 (10 overs)

England won by 7 wickets
Trent Bridge, Nottingham
Umpires: Rob Bailey (Eng) and Steve Davis (Aus)
Player of the match: Eoin Morgan (Eng)

- New Zealand won the toss and elected to bat.
- This was England's highest ever successful run-chase in ODIs.
- Joe Root and Eoin Morgan's stand of 198 runs is the highest partnership against New Zealand in ODIs.
- This was umpire Steve Davis' final match before retiring.

=== 5th ODI ===
20 June 2015
10:30
Scorecard

New Zealand; 283/9 (50 overs)	v	England; 192/7 (25 overs)
Martin Guptill 67 (73); Ben Stokes 3/52 (10 overs)		Jonny Bairstow 83* (60); Mitchell Santner 3/31 (6 overs)

England won by 3 wickets (DLS method)
Riverside Ground, Chester-le-Street
Umpires: Michael Gough (Eng) and Bruce Oxenford (Aus)
Player of the match: Jonny Bairstow (Eng)

- England won the toss and elected to field.
- Rain reduced England's target to 192 from 26 overs.
- Andrew Mathieson (NZ) made his ODI debut.

== T20I series ==
=== Only T20I ===
23 June 2015
18:00 (D/N)
Scorecard

England; 191/7 (20 overs)	v	New Zealand; 135 (16.2 overs)
Joe Root 68 (46); Mitchell Santner 2/28 (4 overs)		Kane Williamson 57 (37); David Willey 3/22 (2.2 overs)

England won by 56 runs
Old Trafford, Manchester
Umpires: Rob Bailey (Eng) and Tim Robinson (Eng)
Player of the match: Joe Root (Eng)

- England won the toss and elected to bat.
- Mitchell Santner (NZ), Sam Billings, David Willey, Mark Wood (all Eng) made their T20I debuts.
