= Daniel Bell-Drummond =

English cricketer (born 1993)

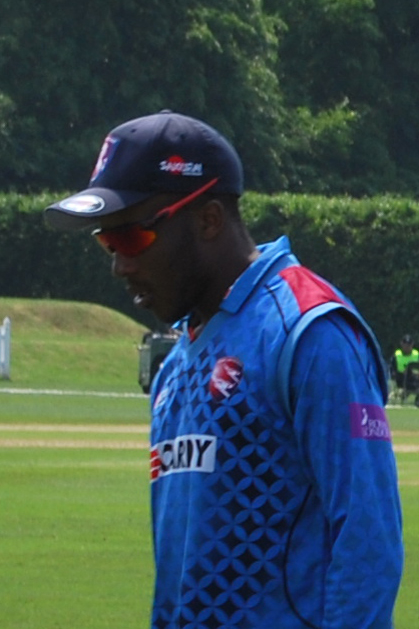
- Bell-Drummond playing for Kent at Beckenham in 2016

Personal information
- Full name: Daniel James Bell-Drummond
- Born: 4 August 1993 (age 33); Lewisham, London
- Nickname: DBD, Deebs
- Batting: Right-handed
- Bowling: Right-arm medium-fast
- Role: Batsman

Domestic team information
- Years: Team
- 2011–: Kent (squad no. 23)
- 2017: Rajshahi Kings
- 2018/19: Auckland (squad no. 23)
- 2020: Colombo Kings (squad no. 23)
- 2021: Birmingham Phoenix (squad no. 45)
- 2022–2024: London Spirit
- FC debut: 18 May 2011 Kent v Loughborough MCCU
- LA debut: 31 July 2011 Kent v Worcestershire

Career statistics
Competition	FC	LA	T20
Matches	187	102	191
Runs scored	10,254	4,186	5,347
Batting average	34.06	45.50	30.03
100s/50s	21/47	9/26	3/40
Top score	300*	171*	112*
Balls bowled	1,352	155	111
Wickets	25	5	5
Bowling average	29.80	24.20	38.20
5 wickets in innings	0	0	0
10 wickets in match	0	0	0
Best bowling	3/37	2/22	2/19
Catches/stumpings	79/0	38/–	60/–
- Source: Cricinfo, 27 September 2026

Daniel James Bell-Drummond (born 4 August 1993) is an English professional cricketer, who plays for Kent County Cricket Club. He has represented England at youth level and has played for the England Lions Cricket Team at a senior level.

Primarily a batsman, Bell-Drummond made his senior cricket debut in 2011. In October 2023 he was appointed as Kent's club captain, replacing Sam Billings who had resigned the role at the end of the 2023 season.

== Early life ==
Bell-Drummond was born in Lewisham in south-east London in 1993. His parents are of Jamaican descent and he has described how watching both West Indian and English cricket at home was a major influence on his development. He was spotted by Kent County Cricket Club playing for Catford Wanderers as a seven-year-old and progressed through the county system, scoring his first century for the under-10 team aged just seven. He played for Kent age group teams, scoring centuries at every level, before joining the Cricket Academy at Kent where he was awarded the John Aitken Gary Trophy as the Academy Scholar of the Year in 2010. He signed a three-year professional contract with Kent in September 2010 at age 17.

Bell-Drummond attended Dulwich Prep, won a scholarship to Millfield School, and played cricket for the school team as well as for England at under-15, under-17 and under-19 levels, captaining the under-17 team against Sri Lanka in 2010. He completed his sixth form studies at the school in 2012 after signing his professional contract with Kent and was named the Young Wisden Schools Cricketer of the Year in the 2012 edition of Wisden after scoring over 800 runs for Millfield in 2011.

== England youth cricket ==
Having represented England at under-15 and under-17 levels, Bell-Drummond played for the England under-19 cricket team against Sri Lanka in 2010. He made his youth Test debut on 21 July 2010 at the County Ground, Northampton before scoring unbeaten 88 in the second youth Test later in the same month, aged only 16. He played in both under-19 Test matches and in four youth one-day international matches during England's return tour of Sri Lanka in January and February 2011.

In July 2011 Bell-Drummond played in a one-day series against South Africa under-19s. He top-scored for England in three of the seven matches in the series and was the leading run scorer for the team in the series, scoring 329 runs in seven innings at an average of 47.00.

After touring Bangladesh with the England under-19 team during January and February 2012 and again leading the team in run scoring, playing in all seven youth ODIs, Bell-Drummond played in a four-way 50-over competition against Australia, India and New Zealand under-19s in North Queensland in April 2012. He was the leading run-scorer in the competition with 287 runs at an average of 95.66, including a match-winning 103 not out against Australia in an innings when the next highest score for the England team was 28. Later the same month he was described as "perhaps the most exciting young batsman in the country" and was named in the England team for the 2012 Under-19 World Cup, held in Queensland in August 2012. By his standards he had a disappointing tournament after being tipped as "one of the batsmen to watch".

== Senior cricket career ==
Bell-Drummond made his first-class cricket debut for Kent at the age of 17 in a university match against Loughborough MCCU in May 2011, scoring 80 runs from 103 balls. In July the same year he made his senior List A cricket debut in a Clydesdale Bank 40 match against Worcestershire before going on to play in three County Championship matches for Kent towards the end of the 2011 season. He spent most of the 2012 season playing for Kent's Second XI, making only two first-class appearances during the season, including against the touring South Africans at Canterbury.

He made his maiden first-class century in April 2013 against a Cardiff University team and used the innings to become a regular in the Kent team during the 2013 season. After cementing his place in the Kent team in all forms of cricket and scoring a century against the touring Australian team in June 2015, Bell-Drummond was awarded his county cap in August 2015. In August 2015 he deputised as an emergency wicket-keeper in Kent's County Championship match at Derby when Sam Billings suffered a finger injury, keeping wicket until Ryan Davies arrived from Second XI duty to act as a substitute. He deputised again in May 2017 when Adam Rouse injured a thumb, taking one catch behind the stumps.

In December 2015 Bell-Drummond made his first appearance for England Lions against the United Arab Emirates in a T20 match in Dubai. He scored 5 runs from 5 deliveries opening the batting. Later the same month, he played in the final game of the five match T20 series against Pakistan A scoring 17 runs.

Bell-Drummond made an excellent start to the 2016 domestic season, hitting his maiden first-class double-hundred against Loughborough MCCU followed by a century in his first innings of the County Championship season against Leicestershire. He and Tom Latham then combined for two first-wicket century partnerships in Kent's opening home match of the Championship against Glamorgan, only the third time this had been achieved in the same championship match in the county's history. Bell-Drummond was selected for England Lions again during the 2016 summer, playing limited overs matches against both Pakistan A and Sri Lanka A. He scored his highest List A cricket score of 171 not out against Sri Lanka A at Canterbury during the series of matches as he combined with Ben Duckett to post the second highest List A partnership on record.

During the 2016–17 English off-season Bell-Drummond was again selected for the Lions, playing against the UAE in Dubai during December and in the List A matches against Sri Lanka A in March, scoring a century in the 4th match of the series. He was also chosen to play in the North v South pre-season series in the United Arab Emirates.

Bell-Drummond was signed as injury cover by the Rajshahi Kings during the 2017–18 Bangladesh Premier League season. He made his debut in the competition on 21 November 2017, although only played once for the team. After playing for Kent in the Caribbean 2017–18 Regional Super50 competition, he played in the North v South pre-season series in Barbados and captained the MCC team in the Champion County match.

Good form in one-day cricket during the 2018 promotion season was followed by Bell-Drummond signing a new, long-term contract with Kent during the 2018/19 off-season. During the off-season he played Sydney Grade Cricket for Randwick Petersham Cricket Club, making a century on his debut in the first-grade competition before being signed to play in the later stages of the 2018–19 Super Smash T20 competition in New Zealand for Auckland.

The 2019 season saw Bell-Drummond lead Kent's batting, scoring a club best 987 runs in first-class cricket. He broke his run of seasons without a first-class hundred, scoring a century against Warwickshire, registering his highest County Championship score of 166 runs. He scored six half-centuries in first-class cricket, was Kent's leading T20 run scorer and scored a century in the Royal London Cup competition, averaging more than 60 runs per innings in four matches in the competition. The shortened 2020 season saw Bell-Drummond once again as Kent's leading T20 run scorer, although he failed to score a first-class half-century, playing in all of Kent's five matches and captaining the team in the absence of both club captain Sam Billings and Joe Denly, both of whom were on England duty. During the 2020/21 off-season he played for Colombo Kings in the inaugural season of the Lanka Premier League.

In February 2021, he was drafted by Birmingham Phoenix for the inaugural season of The Hundred. He featured in the team's first three group stage matches but failed to score more than 12 runs in an innings.

In April 2022, he was bought by the London Spirit for the 2022 season of The Hundred.

== Platform cricket project ==
During 2017 Bell-Drummond set up Platform, a cricket project aiming to increase participation in the sport by young people based in the London Borough of Lewisham, the area in which he grew up. The project involves reintroducing the sport into local primary schools and includes after-school and winter coaching. It ran a cricket festival for school children at Deptford during 2018 and was initially funded by Bell-Drummond and a business partner. Lewisham is a relatively low-income London borough with a significant Afro-Caribbean population and the initiative was partly influenced by a decline in participation in cricket in the Afro-Caribbean population. In 2018 it was revealed that Bell-Drummond was one of only eight black or mixed-race cricketers playing in the County Championship, with only three, including Bell-Drummond, aged 25 or under. A 2020 study revealed that Bell-Drummond was one of only nine black players who featured in the County Championship during the 2019 season, down from a figure of 33 in 1995.

== Career best performances ==
As of June 2025, Bell-Drummond has scored 19 first-class centuries, including two double-centuries and one triple-century. His highest score of 300 not out was made against Northants at Northampton during the 2023 season, surpassing the 206 not out he made against Loughborough MCC University at the start of the 2016 season at the St Lawrence Ground in Canterbury. His maiden first-class century was scored against Cardiff MCC University at the start of the 2013 season. In July 2022 he scored two centuries in a match for the first time, batting for nine hours in a match against Surrey at The Oval and making scores of 102 and 107 not out to help save the game for Kent.

He has scored seven List A centuries, with a highest score of 171 not out made for England Lions in 2016, and three Twenty20 centuries: scores of 112 not out against Surrey at Tunbridge Wells in 2016, 111 against Middlesex at Canterbury in 2023, and 100 against Somerset at Taunton in 2025. In 2017 he and Joe Denly set Kent's record partnership for any wicket in T20 cricket, adding 207 runs for the first wicket against Essex at Chelmsford. At the time this was a world record opening partnership in Twenty20 cricket, and the third highest in the world for any wicket in the format. Earlier in the same season he and Denly had scored 163 runs against Surrey for the first-wicket at The Oval, setting the previous highest partnership for any wicket for Kent.

Despite having bowled regularly whilst playing age-group cricket, Bell-Drummond began his career bowling infrequently in senior cricket, citing a number of injury concerns as the main reason for not doing so. He took his first professional wicket in 2018 and began to bowl rather more frequently during the start of the 2019 season, taking five wickets during Kent's 2019 Royal London One-Day Cup campaign with his "slippery right-arm seamers" and contributing wickets in the County Championship. His best first-class bowling figures of three wickets for 37 runs were taken against Essex at the end of the 2022 season. He took 2/22 against Surrey during the 2019 season's One-Day Cup, his best List A bowling figures, and 2/19 against Somerset in the 2019 t20 Blast, his first T20 wickets.

Updated 21 June 2025

	Batting				Bowling (innings)			
	Score	Fixture	Venue	Season	Analysis	Fixture	Venue	Season
First-class cricket	300 not out	Kent v Northants	Northampton	2023	3/37	Kent v Essex	Canterbury	2022
List A cricket	171 not out	England Lions v Sri Lanka A	Canterbury	2016	2/22	Kent v Surrey	Beckenham	2019
Twenty20 cricket	112 not out	Kent v Surrey	Tunbridge Wells	2016	2/19	Kent v Somerset	Taunton	2019

Preceded by Will Vanderspar	Young Wisden Schools Cricketer of the Year; 2012	Succeeded by Tom Abell
Preceded by Sam Billings	Kent County Cricket Club captain 2024	Succeeded by Incumbent
