= Jos Buttler =

English cricketer (born 1990)

Jos Buttler MBE
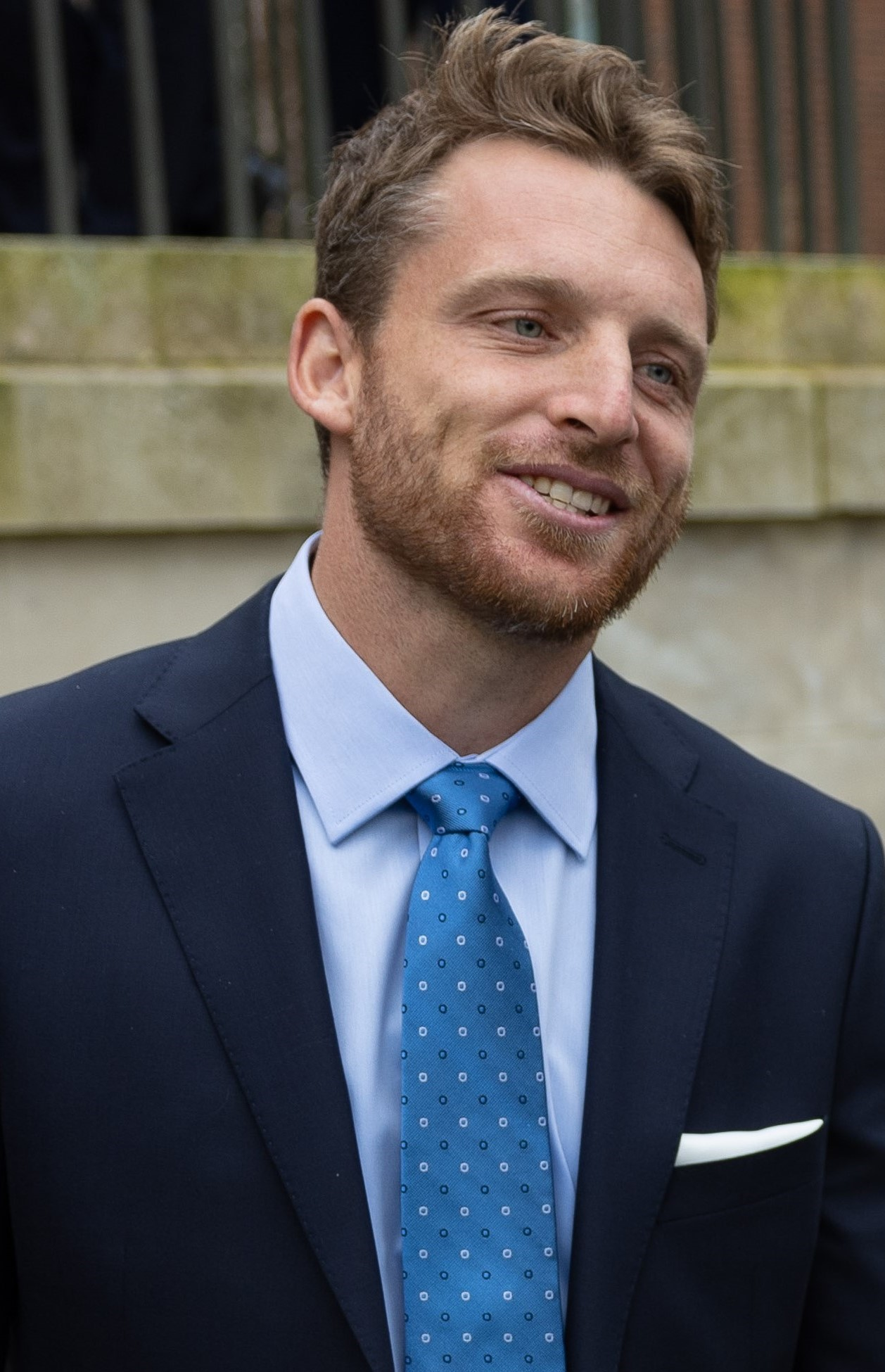
- Buttler in 2023

Personal information
- Full name: Joseph Charles Buttler
- Born: 8 September 1990 (age 36); Taunton, Somerset, England
- Height: 6 ft 0 in (1.83 m)
- Batting: Right-handed
- Bowling: none
- Role: Wicket-keeper-batsman

International information
- National side: England (2011–present)
- Test debut (cap 665): 27 July 2014 v India
- Last Test: 5 January 2022 v Australia
- ODI debut (cap 226): 21 February 2012 v Pakistan
- Last ODI: 24 September 2026 v Sri Lanka
- ODI shirt no.: 63
- T20I debut (cap 54): 31 August 2011 v India
- Last T20I: 19 September 2026 v Sri Lanka
- T20I shirt no.: 63

Domestic team information
- Years: Team
- 2009–2013: Somerset
- 2013/14: Melbourne Renegades
- 2014–present: Lancashire
- 2016–2017: Mumbai Indians
- 2017: Comilla Victorians
- 2017/18–2018/19: Sydney Thunder
- 2018–2024: Rajasthan Royals
- 2021–present: Manchester Super Giants
- 2023–2024: Paarl Royals
- 2025–present: Gujarat Titans
- 2025–present: Durban's Super Giants

Career statistics
Competition	Test	ODI	T20I	FC
Matches	57	204	163	122
Runs scored	2,907	5,678	4,384	5,888
Batting average	31.94	39.15	34.79	32.17
100s/50s	2/18	11/30	2/30	7/33
Top score	152	162*	131	152
Catches/stumpings	153/1	242/39	100/22	274/3
Medal record
Men's cricket
Representing England
ICC Cricket World Cup
Winner	2019 England and Wales
ICC T20 World Cup
Winner	2022 Australia
Runner-up	2016 India
ICC Champions Trophy
Runner-up	2013 England and Wales
- Source: ESPNcricinfo, 25 September 2026

Joseph Charles Buttler MBE (born 8 September 1990) is an English international cricketer and the former captain of the England cricket team. He plays for Lancashire in domestic cricket and has played in multiple T20 leagues. Widely regarded as England's greatest-ever white-ball cricketer, he is known for his innovative and aggressive batting style. He was part of the England team that won the 2019 ODI World Cup and led the team to victory at the 2022 T20 World Cup.

Buttler made his T20I debut in 2011, his ODI debut in 2012, and his Test debut in 2014. He was the vice-captain and a crucial member of the England team that won the 2019 Cricket World Cup, and made the run out during the Super Over which sealed victory in the final. He was appointed captain of England's limited-overs teams in June 2022. He captained England to victory at the 2022 T20 World Cup, top-scoring for his country at the tournament.

Buttler plays as a right-handed wicket-keeper-batsman and is England's most-capped T20I player. Along with Adil Rashid, he holds the world record for highest seventh-wicket stand in ODIs: 177 against New Zealand during their 2015 tour of England. He is England's highest run-scorer in T20Is, and is one of only two Englishmen to score multiple T20I centuries. As a wicket-keeper, he holds the England record for most dismissals in both ODI and T20I formats. In August 2026, Buttler became the highest run-scorer in men's T20 cricket, surpassing Kieron Pollard's previous record.

== Early life ==
Born in Taunton, Somerset, on 8 September 1990, Buttler was educated at King's College, Taunton, where he displayed his early talent in cricket.

== Domestic career ==
=== Youth ===
Buttler played extensively for Somerset's youth teams, appearing at Under-13, Under-15 and Under-17 level. He made his senior club cricket debut for Cheddar before moving to Glastonbury in the 2006 season, aged just 15, taking three catches and 15 runs as wicket-keeper. Later in the same season, he made his first appearance for Somerset Second XI, scoring 71 in the second-innings, and taking six catches in the three-day match against Nottinghamshire Second XI. Playing for King's College, he finished the 2006 season with the school's leading batting average, scoring 447 runs at an average of 49.66. The following season he played regularly for Glastonbury in the West of England Premier League, and for Somerset Under-17s, for whom he scored two centuries; an unbeaten 119 during a two-day match against Surrey Under-17s, and 110 against Sussex Under-17s. He once again led the batting averages for King's College, with his 358 runs coming at 51.14.

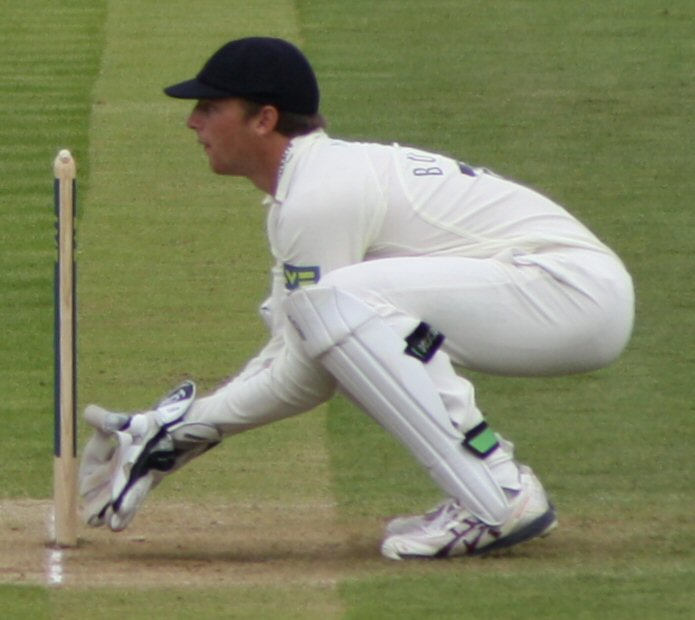
Buttler wicket keeping for Somerset

The highlight of his school career came in April 2008, when he scored 227 not out during a record-breaking opening stand in a 50-over national schools game, adding 340 with Alex Barrow. He captained King's during the 2008 season, and improved on his batting totals from the previous two years, scoring 851 runs, over 250 more than any other member of the team. His batting average of 94.55 was the sixth highest amongst all school's batsmen reported in Wisden, while his high-score of 227* was the highest score they recorded. During that 2008 season, Buttler also played for Somerset Second XI. With captain Carl Gazzard keeping wicket in the majority of these matches, Buttler played purely as a batsman, although in his final match of the season for the team, he kept wicket and took six catches in the first-innings against Worcestershire Second XI. In the previous match, against Hampshire Second XI, Buttler had made 140 batting from number four.

He made his first-class debut for Somerset in September 2009, replacing the injured Justin Langer for the County Championship match against Lancashire, scoring 30 in his only innings. He retained his place in the team for the following Pro40 match against Hampshire, making his List A debut, although he was not required to bat. Selected as part of the Somerset squad for the 2009 Champions League Twenty20, Buttler made his debut in the 20-over format of the game in Somerset's final match of the league stage, remaining six not out at the close of the innings. Buttler again captained King's in 2009, and in the seventeen matches under his leadership they lost only once, and also won the Western School Twenty20 competition. Coupled with his 554 runs for the school at an average of 61.55, and his performances for Somerset, he was named 2010 Young Wisden Schools Cricketer of the Year.

=== First-team opportunity ===
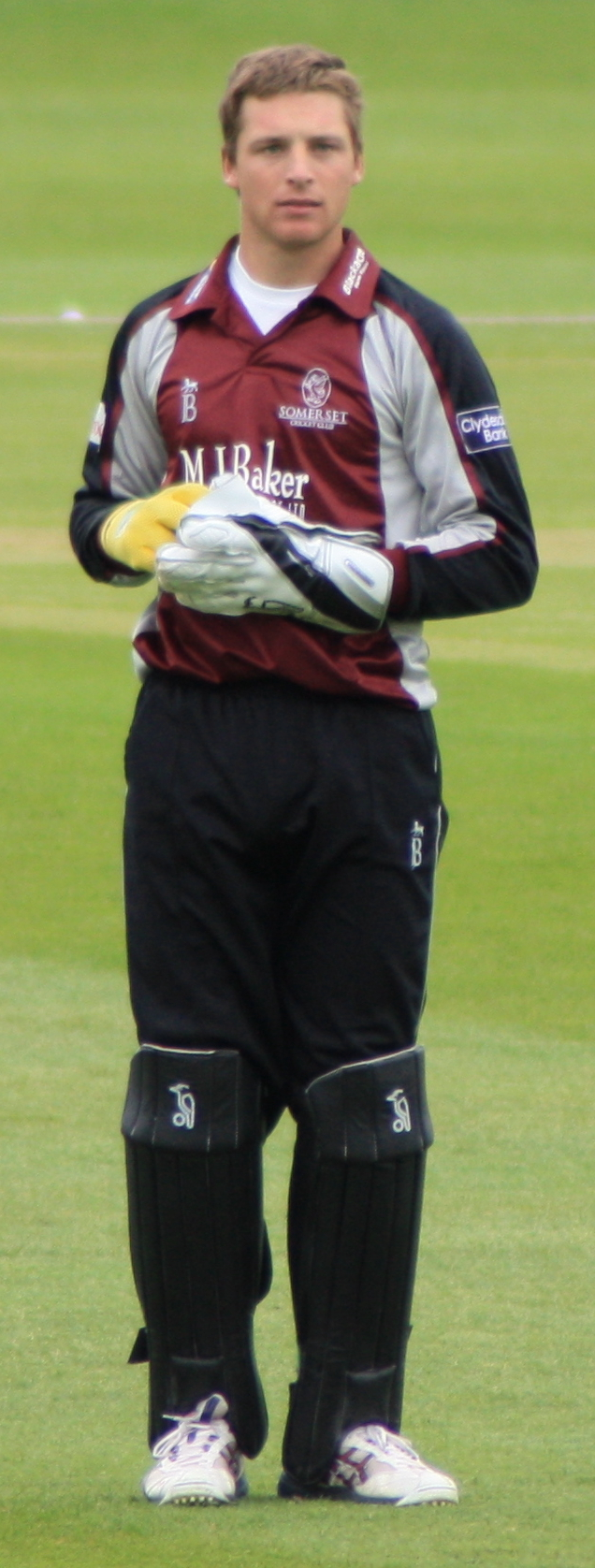
Buttler keeping wicket for Somerset in the ECB 40

When Craig Kieswetter was called up to the England one-day team in 2010, Buttler was given the chance of a prolonged run in Somerset's first team. Brian Rose, Somerset's Director of Cricket, chose not to bring in an experienced keeper to deputise, explaining that Kieswetter had been in a similar position three years earlier and that he had good reports of Buttler's ability. In his first match of the 2010 season, Buttler remained 22 not out at the close of Somerset's innings, posting his first runs in List A cricket, and he followed this up with two catches to help Somerset beat Glamorgan in their opening Clydesdale Bank 40 fixture.

He made his maiden first-class century in his fourth County Championship match, scoring 144 runs in an innings characterised by "dogged determination and [a] decent range of shots". In his next match, he scored his debut List A half-century against Sussex. Buttler joined James Hildreth at the crease with Somerset at 109/4, requiring 183 more runs to win off 129 balls. The pair put on a partnership of 158 runs "to turn the game on its head", with Buttler making 69 in 53 balls. In doing so, they set a new record partnership for the fifth-wicket against Sussex. His continued good batting form, which also saw him make scores of 52 and 31* in a County Championship match against Yorkshire, saw him retain his place in the Somerset team upon Kieswetter's return.

Buttler was named Man of the Match in Somerset's 2010 Friends Provident T20 semi-final victory over Nottinghamshire at the Rose Bowl, reaching a "breathtaking" half-century from 21 balls to score an unbeaten 55 runs in a partnership of 75 with Kieron Pollard. His aggressive batting won him many plaudits and helped Somerset reach the final of the 2010 Clydesdale Bank 40 as well as the Twenty20 cup.

His good form with the bat continued into 2011 as Somerset again reached the final of both the T20 and 40 over competitions, with Buttler top-scoring with a "mature" 86 runs from 72 balls in the 40 over final. In both 2010 and 2011 he was awarded the NBC Denis Compton Award as Somerset's most promising young player and made his full England debut at the end of the season.

The 2012 season proved similarly productive for Buttler, and featured a "brilliant" half-century scored from 36 balls against Northamptonshire in the domestic 40 over competition, although increasing international call-ups limited his appearances for Somerset and Kieswetter remained the first-choice wicket-keeper for Somerset. The second County Championship match of the 2013 season saw Buttler score 94 runs playing as a specialist batsman and an injury to Kieswetter at the end of April provided an opportunity for Buttler to claim his place as wicket-keeper in the team. Somerset started the County Championship season poorly, but Buttler was praised for adopting a mature approach to his batting, averaging over 40 with the bat in the Championship at the midpoint of the season and enjoying his most productive first-class season to date. After missing county matches again due to international call-ups, Buttler saw Kieswetter return as wicket-keeper in some T20 county matches and began to publicly question his future at the club if he was not to keep wicket regularly for the one-day team. He delayed signing a new contract he had been offered, concerned that by not being the main wicket-keeper for Somerset that he would put his international wicket-keeping place in jeopardy, despite a strong emotional attachment to the county. Despite Somerset's desire to keep Buttler at the club, they were unable to reach an agreement which satisfied Buttler's desire to keep wicket, and at the end of the season he announced that he would be leaving Somerset with the aim of securing his international place and breaking into the England Test team.

=== Move to Lancashire ===
At the end of September 2013, Lancashire announced they had signed Buttler. He scored 42 in his first Championship appearance for the county before compiling a "game-changing" innings of 72 on a difficult pitch at Northampton. This showcased Buttler's first-class batting potential and contributed to a record seventh wicket partnership for Lancashire against Northants. He scored his first century for Lancashire (his fourth in first-class cricket) in June against Durham before equalling the record for the fastest fifty scored in T20 cricket, hitting a half-century in 22 balls against Northants on his way to 58 not out in the 2014 NatWest T20 Blast. Lancashire finished runners-up of the T20 competition, losing to Warwickshire in the final. He played 10 first-class matches for Lancashire during the season and was called into the England Test team as wicket-keeper in July, replacing the injured Matt Prior, although doubts remained about the quality of his wicket-keeping.

He extended his stay with Lancashire, announcing a new three-year contract on 27 May 2016.

== England career ==
=== 2008–10: England youth career ===
Buttler's first taste of international cricket came in July 2008, when he represented England Under-17s in two warm-up matches against New Zealand Under-19s. Batting at number five, he scored a rapid 77 not out in the 50-over contest, hitting 11 fours and two sixes during the 49 deliveries he faced. He also played in the two-day match between the two teams, scoring 45 in the first-innings as the match was drawn.

In 2009, Buttler played four matches for England Under-18s, two each against Scotland A and Scotland Development XI. He scored 103 not out in the first of these matches, and made starts in each of the following matches, reaching double figures on each occasion, but not scoring higher than 28. Two months later, Buttler made his England Under-19 debut, appearing in the first T20 against Bangladesh Under-19s. Playing as a specialist batsman, he scored 33 runs off 17 balls as England won by five wickets.

During the 2009–10 English winter, Buttler toured with the England Under-19 team. He joined up with the squad in Bangladesh following Somerset's elimination from the Champions League Twenty20 for the seven-match youth One Day International (ODI) series, playing again as a specialist batsman. He failed to make a significant impact until the final match when he top-scored for England with 42 runs. He remained with the team for the Under-19 World Cup, where he played all but one of England's six matches, keeping wicket in three of them. He scored 91 runs in three innings, with a top-score of 78 against India in the fifth-place play-off semi-final. His batting average of 30.33 ranked him fifth on the England team.

=== 2011–12: Early senior career ===
Buttler was called into the senior England squad for the Twenty20 International (T20I) against the touring Indian team in September 2011. He made his debut for the team in the match as a specialist batsman before going on to play against the touring West Indies team later the same season. During the winter of 2011 he was part of the England performance programme for batting and wicket-keeping in India, and played in the England Lions tours of Bangladesh and Sri Lanka, scoring his maiden limited-overs century against Sri Lanka A in January 2012. He played a T20I against India in Kolkata and then toured with England to play Pakistan in the United Arab Emirates in early 2012, making his ODI debut, although he was out second ball without scoring.

Buttler continued to play regular T20 cricket for England throughout 2012. Against South Africa at Edgbaston, he joined Somerset teammate Craig Kieswetter with England on 64/3 with only 16 balls remaining. The pair gave "a brutal display of power hitting", raising the final score to 118/5, with Buttler hitting 30 runs from one 32-run over from Wayne Parnell, the second most productive over in International T20 at the time. The innings established Buttler as a key part of the England one-day team; he had made 10 appearances before the match but reached double figures only once in his six innings, and his performance made him "one of the most talked-about players" in the England team. Buttler spoke about how the innings made him feel "calmer, more myself, more relaxed" and he received an ECB incremental contract later in the same month. He was selected for the England squad for the 2012 ICC World Twenty20, playing in all five of England's matches in the competition, although he scored only 40 runs in his five innings.

=== 2013–14: Test debut, Champions Trophy and T20 World Cup ===
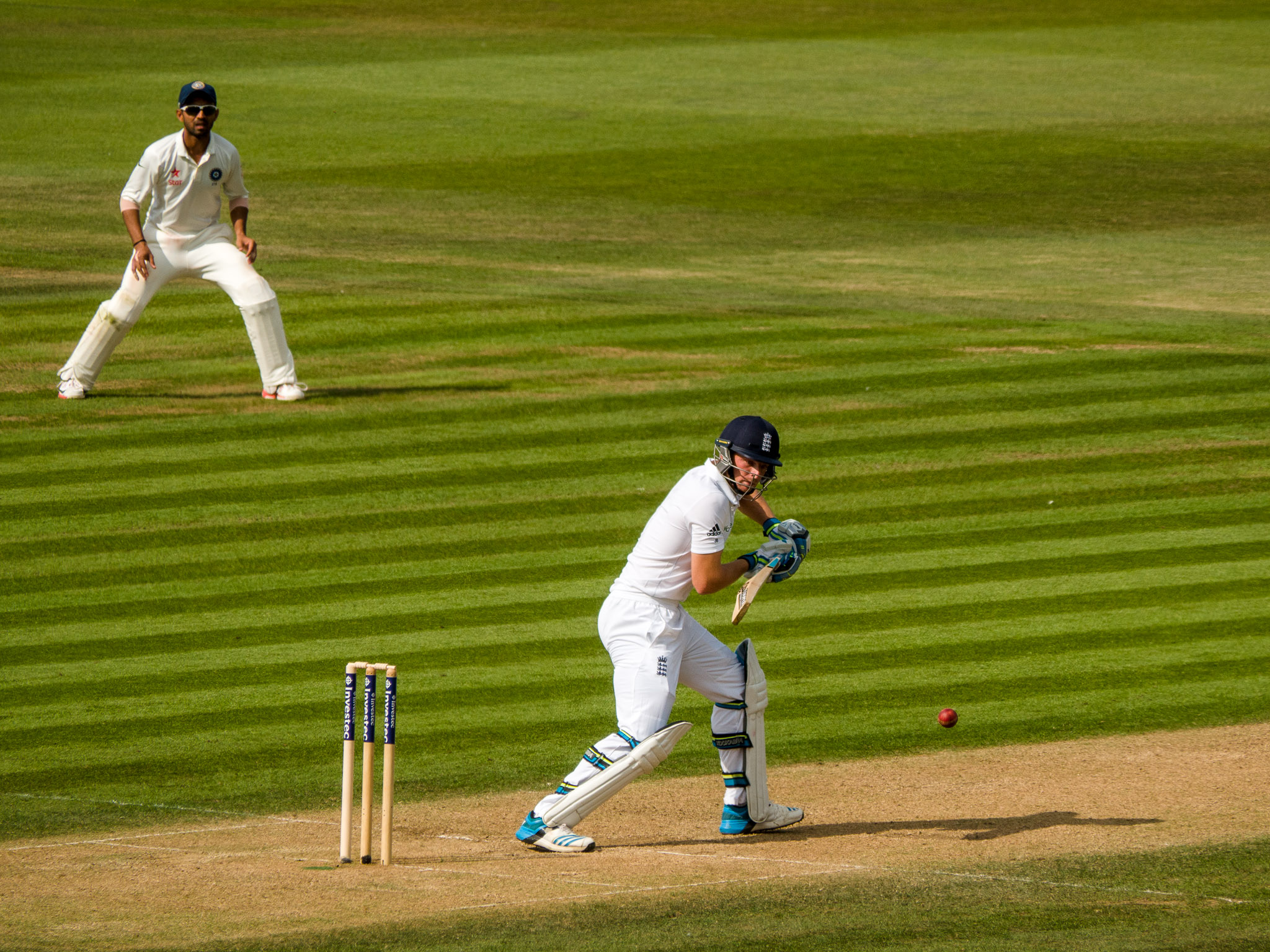
Buttler batting against India on Test debut in Southampton (2014).

Buttler replaced a rested Jonathan Trott in the England ODI squad in India in early 2013 and replaced Craig Kieswetter as the first-choice wicket-keeper halfway through the ODI series. This allowed Buttler to break into the England ODI team on a consistent basis, playing regularly throughout the year in both ODI and T20 formats and increasingly as a wicket-keeper, despite some reservations about the quality of his work behind the stumps. He scored his maiden half-century for England in a T20 warm-up match at the start of England's tour of New Zealand followed by his first T20I half-century in the second match of the series. After being confirmed as England's first-choice limited-overs wicket-keeper, he played in every match in the 2013 ICC Champions Trophy in England. For his performances in 2013, he was named in the T20I XI by Cricinfo.

Buttler played again in the 2014 ICC World Twenty20 in Bangladesh in March and played regular one-day cricket throughout the year. He scored his maiden ODI century against Sri Lanka at Lord's in May, scoring 121 in 61 balls with nine fours and four sixes, the then-fastest century by any England batsman. During the fifth ODI of the series at Edgbaston, Buttler was controversially 'Mankaded' by Sachithra Senanayake, leading to tension between the teams. England captain Alastair Cook expressed his disappointment, stating: "I've never seen it before in a game. I was pretty disappointed. If he was properly trying to steal the single then I could possibly understand it. But he was half a yard out of his crease.".

After first choice wicket-keeper Matt Prior stood down after injury on 22 July 2014, Buttler was called up for the England squad for the third Test against India. He made 85 runs from 83 balls in his first Test innings. He played in the final three Tests of the series before reverting to one-day duty, touring Sri Lanka at the end of the year.

=== 2015–17: World Cup, Ashes series, UAE and tour of Bangladesh ===
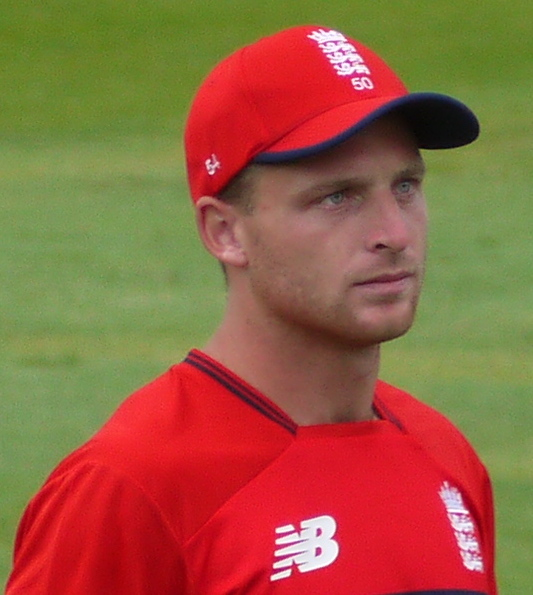
Jos Buttler representing England in a Twenty20 International against South Africa at Taunton in June 2017.

After playing for England in the Tri-series in Australia at the start of the year, Buttler was once again involved with England at an international tournament, playing in the 2015 Cricket World Cup in Australia and New Zealand. He scored an unbeaten 39 in 19 balls against Sri Lanka and made 65 against Bangladesh but ultimately England lost both matches in a disastrous campaign, failing to progress beyond the group stages.

Later in the English winter he was selected in the Test team, as wicket-keeper, for the tour of the West Indies. He continued in the role throughout the English summer, playing both Tests against New Zealand and all five Ashes Tests against Australia.

He continued to play one-day cricket alongside his Test role, making his then highest ODI score of 129 from 77 balls against New Zealand.

After playing in the first two Tests against Pakistan in the United Arab Emirates during October, Buttler was dropped for the third Test, replaced as wicket-keeper by Jonny Bairstow, and was not selected for any of the Test matches during England's tour of South Africa, although he did play again in the one-day fixtures during the tour. In the fourth ODI against Pakistan in Dubai in November, he scored a 46-ball century, the fastest ODI hundred by an England player.

Buttler again played for England in the 2016 ICC World Twenty20 and was a regular fixture in the limited-overs squad throughout the year. He scored an unbeaten 90 runs against Pakistan as part of an England record score of 444/3, the fastest half-century by an Englishman. Both records have since been surpassed.

Buttler captained the England team in the ODI series against Bangladesh in October 2016 after numerous players, including regular captain Eoin Morgan, declined to tour over raised security concerns following a terrorist attack in Dhaka in July. In the second ODI, there was some controversy as Buttler was involved in a heated exchange with numerous Bangladesh players following his dismissal to Taskin Ahmed. Buttler, aggravated by the opposition's excessive celebrations, turned to confront them, resulting in him being ushered away by the umpires. Following the incident, Buttler was kept away by the International Cricket Council (ICC) and received one demerit point to his peace record, while Bangladesh captain Mashrafe Mortaza and Sabbir Rahman were each fined 20% of their match fees and given a demerit point and their money removed.

Buttler was again reserve wicket-keeper for the Test series against Bangladesh. He returned to the England Test team for the third Test against India in November, playing in the final three Tests of the series. Buttler averaged just under 40 in a horror tour for England resulting in a 4–0 hammering, he top scored in Mumbai with a counter-attacking 76 to drag the visitors to a solid score. He continued as a regular in the limited-overs team throughout 2016 and 2017, playing again for England in the 2017 ICC Champions Trophy, but was unable to break back into the Test team and was not selected for the 2017–18 Ashes series in Australia. He was named in the ICC World ODI XI in 2016.

=== 2018–2022: Return to Test cricket, World Cup and Ashes series ===
In May 2018, Buttler was recalled into England's Test squad to play Pakistan at Lord's later that month. He had a successful return to Test cricket, scoring two half-centuries and scoring the most runs in the series; he also won the Man of the Match award at Headingley. His unbeaten 80 was the catalyst to put England ahead of the game after first innings.

In the subsequent ODI series against Australia in June 2018, he scored two half-centuries in the first four matches and then, in the fifth and final game of the series, he made 110 not out to take England to a historic series whitewash. In this match, no other English batsman made more than 20 and Buttler was afterwards described as "the best white-ball wicketkeeper batsman in the world". Buttler was named Man of the Match for his 110 not out, and also named Man of the Series for his impressive contributions with both bat and gloves. Buttler's innings was remarkable, coming in at 27–4, he looked the only settled batsman before the hosts slumped to 114–8. Alongside the tail, he dragged England home in dramatic style. In 2020, Wisden ranked it Buttler's finest ODI hundred, as well as the best ODI innings of 2018. In the T20I match of Australia's tour, Buttler scored the fastest T20I half-century by an English cricketer, in 22 balls.

Buttler replaced James Anderson as the Test vice-captain on 31 July 2018, thus combining the role in all formats. He registered his maiden Test century in the third Test of India's tour of England in August 2018, with a score of 106. Buttler then retained his place in the Test and one-day squads, being selected to tour Sri Lanka in October and into the following year. In a low-scoring series, Buttler hit two vital half-centuries as England romped to a 3–0 win. He was commended for nullifying the extremely difficult batting conditions by employing techniques such as using his feet and frequently playing sweep shots.

In February 2019, during the fourth ODI of England's tour of the West Indies, Buttler scored a career-best 150 from 77 deliveries as England reached 418/6. During this innings, he hit 12 sixes, at the time the most by any English batsman in an ODI, and went from 51 to 100 in just 15 balls and from 100 to 150 in just 16 deliveries. This was part of an England world record for the most sixes in an ODI, with 24. Following the innings, West Indian batsman Chris Gayle praised Buttler, stating, "He is superb, one of the best strikers [of the ball] in world cricket today. ... We can see he is a game-winner, a game-changer and every team needs a player like that to win games.", while England captain Eoin Morgan described him as "built like a champion racehorse".

In the second ODI of the five-match series against Pakistan in May, Buttler scored an unbeaten 110 from 55 balls, his century coming in only 50 deliveries. This is the second fastest hundred by an English batsman in ODI cricket after his own record set against Pakistan in 2015.

==== 2019 Cricket World Cup ====
In April 2019, he was named as the vice-captain of the England squad for the 2019 Cricket World Cup. The ICC named Buttler as the key player of England's squad prior to the tournament.

Buttler made a quiet start to the tournament, scoring only 18 runs in the opening match of the tournament against South Africa at The Oval, which ended in a comprehensive 104-run win for England. In the next match against Pakistan, he scored 103 from 76 balls (the then-fastest century by an English batsman in a World Cup) and shared a 130-run partnership with Joe Root for the fourth wicket, despite a shock 14-run defeat. He made 64 in the third match against Bangladesh as England posted 386/6, their highest ever World Cup score. However, he did not keep wicket during Bangladesh's innings after sustaining a minor hip injury while batting, making way for Jonny Bairstow to assume the role for the match, which England won by 106 runs.

Buttler scored 59 runs in the final against New Zealand and contributed to a crucial 110-run partnership with Ben Stokes to help tie the match. His innings was particularly crucial and game-changing as he scored at a quicker rate on a difficult pitch where other batsmen including his partner and Man Of the Match Ben Stokes struggled. Towards the end with both teams making 241 from their respective innings, he was selected to bat in the ensuing Super Over along with Stokes, from which the pair scored 15 runs; Buttler scoring seven with a boundary from the final ball. He completed the run out of Martin Guptill on the last ball of New Zealand's over as he attempted a match-winning second run. The throw was from Jason Roy which was quite wide of the stumps but Buttler's game awareness and compusure made up for it as he completed the run out. His match winning run out was later awarded as the moment of the year in 2020 in BBC Sports awards of 2019. This tied the Super Over and secured England's maiden World Cup title, winning by a superior boundary count.

In July 2019, following England's World Cup success, the ECB named Buttler in the fourteen-man Test squad for the upcoming Ashes series.

==== 2020 ====
Before the suspension of International Cricket in March, Buttler was part of the England team which beat South Africa in a 3 match T20 series, 2–1. Buttler scored 55 in the final match aiding a large England total and ultimate victory. On 29 May 2020, Buttler was named in a 55-man group of players to begin training ahead of international fixtures starting in England following the COVID-19 pandemic. On 17 June 2020, Buttler was included in England's 30-man squad to start training behind closed doors for the Test series against the West Indies. On 4 July 2020, Buttler was named in England's thirteen-man squad for the first Test match of the series. Buttler was England's stand out batsman of the summer, averaging 52 whilst notching up 2 half centuries, the latter a series winning 75 in the fourth innings at Old Trafford alongside Chris Woakes from almost certain defeat. It was later defined a career saving innings. In the final test of the summer at The Rose Bowl, Southampton, Buttler struck a second test century, 152 off 311 deliveries, in a record partnership with teammate Zak Crawley. It was described as a mature and coming-of-age innings. Despite Buttler's strong summer with the bat, his wicketkeeping was brought under heavy criticism as he dropped several key chances in both series. In September Buttler was named in the England squad for the upcoming Australia ODI and T20 series. Despite a lean ODI series, Buttler scored 43 and a match winning 77* in the first two matches before being rested for the final match. Buttler's year ended with a 3 match T20 visit to South Africa. In the final match of the series Buttler was part of a match-winning and record-breaking second-wicket partnership with teammate Dawid Malan, scoring 67* himself.

==== 2021 ====
On 11 December 2020, Buttler was named vice captain for the tour of Sri Lanka in January 2021 following Ben Stokes' resting. He made scores of 30, 55 and 46 not out in Galle as England won 2–0. He retained the wicket-keeping duties for the tour despite his troubled summer and performed impressively, taking 9 catches and executing his first Test stumping. It was announced on 21 January that Buttler would be returning home after the first test of the upcoming series in India in line with England's rotation and resting policy. This came a day after it was revealed that he had been retained by Rajasthan Royals for the 2021 Indian Premier League. Buttler made scores of 30 and 24 and took 5 catches helping England to a famous victory in the first test against India in Chennai before returning home to rest. Buttler returned to India for the white ball leg of the tour. In the 5 match T20 series in Ahmedabad, Buttler was England's stand out batsman with 2 half centuries and averaging over 40, including his highest T20I score of 83 not out in the 3rd outing. During the following ODI series, Buttler's lean 50 over form continued. However, through Eoin Morgan's finger injury, Buttler captained the final 2 games; winning 1.

In September 2021, Buttler was named in England's squad for the 2021 ICC Men's T20 World Cup. On 1 November 2021, in England's World Cup match against Sri Lanka, Buttler scored his first century in T20I cricket, with a 101*. and became the first English men's player to score a century in all three formats of cricket (Tests, ODIs and T20Is).

In November 2021, Buttler was named as the vice-captain of England's squad for the 2021–22 Ashes series.

==== 2022 ====
On 17 June 2022, Buttler featured in the first ODI as part of a three-match series against the Netherlands. He scored 162 not out in 70 balls, his personal ODI high score and England would score 498 runs, which is the highest ODI score of all time. During that match Buttler scored 150 runs in 65 balls, the second fastest in the history of ODI cricket, one ball behind AB de Villiers.

=== White-ball captaincy ===
Following the retirement of Eoin Morgan, Buttler was appointed as captain of the England ODI and T20I teams on 30 June 2022. His first series as permanent captain was at home to India, with England losing 2–1 in both T20Is and ODIs. This was followed by a drawn ODI series against South Africa and another 2–1 defeat in T20Is, with Buttler making a string of scores between 12 and 29.

==== 2022 T20 World Cup ====
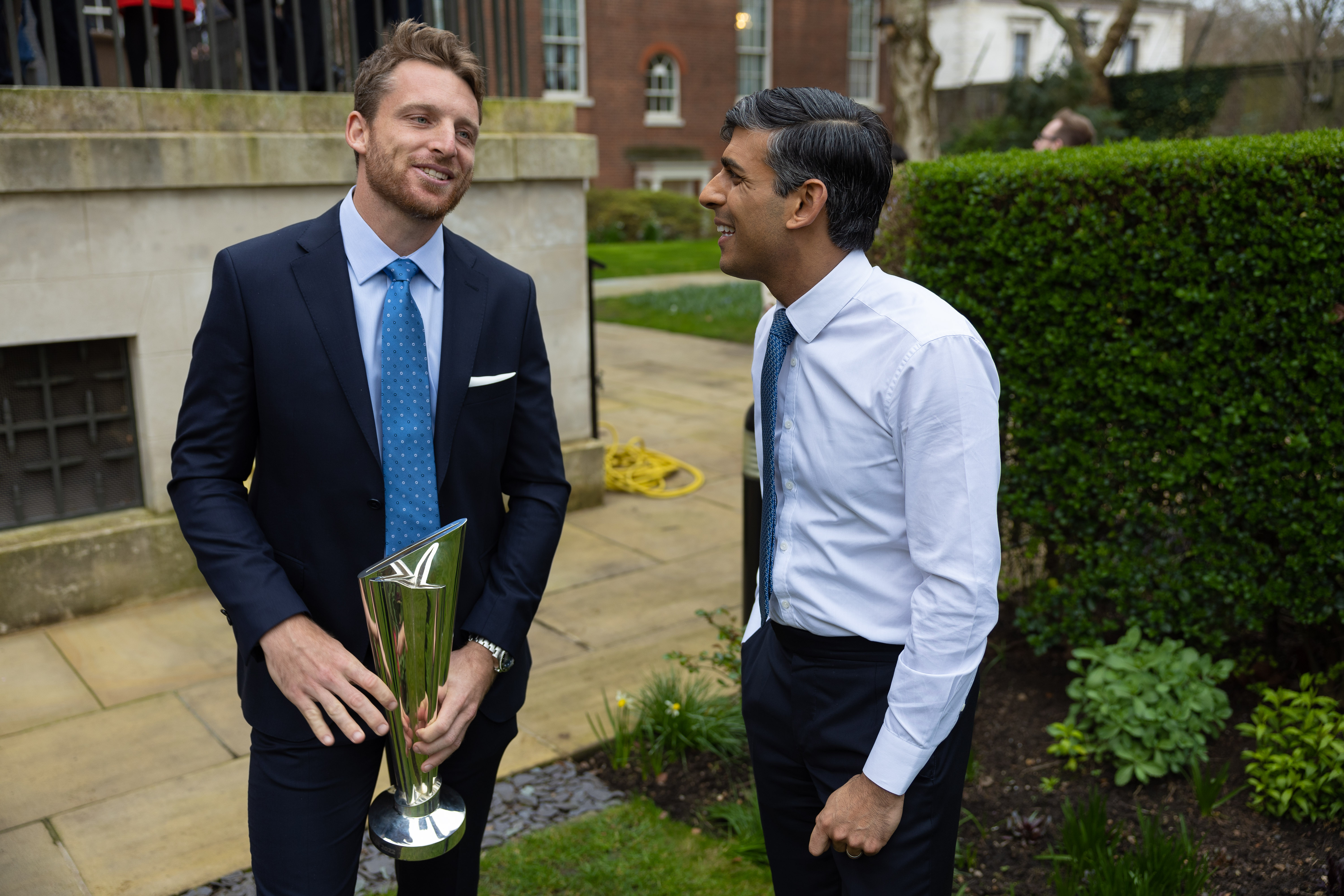
Buttler in a meeting with Prime Minister of the United Kingdom Rishi Sunak after England's 2022 T20 World Cup victory. He is holding the T20 World Cup trophy in his hand.

Buttler's first tournament as captain was the 2022 T20 World Cup. After an opening victory against Afghanistan, a surprise defeat against Ireland and a rained-out game against Australia saw England needing to win their remaining two games to qualify for the next round. In the match against New Zealand, Buttler scored 73 off 47 balls, which helped England seal a crucial victory. In the semi-final, he scored 80 not-out as part of a record opening stand of 170 with Alex Hales (86*), seeing England to a 10-wicket victory and a place in the final. England won the final against 2022 ICC Men's T20 World Cup Pakistan by 5 wickets, with another quickfire score of 26 from 17 balls by Buttler setting them off to a fast start; however, the team was reeling with his dismissal at 45–3, before Ben Stokes saw the team to victory with one over left. With this Buttler became only the second England captain to win a T20 World Cup, making him a World Cup-winning captain. Buttler's role as a captain was particularly the most important in England's victorious World Cup campaign as he gave all-rounders Sam Curran and Ben Stokes clarity about their roles and instilled confidence in the youngsters which helped them perform to their potential, and he succeeded both as a captain and as a batsman in the World Cup.

==== 2024 T20 World Cup ====
In May 2024, he was named the captain in England's squad for the 2024 ICC Men's T20 World Cup tournament. England reached the semi-final of the tournament, losing to eventual champions India.

==== 2025 Champions Trophy ====
Buttler resigned the captaincy during the Champions Trophy 2025, with England having lost their first two matches in the competition and being unable to qualify for the semi-final stage.

== T20 franchise career ==
Buttler has become increasingly involved in playing franchise T20 cricket around the world, and has been described as arguably England's "first ever global Twenty20 superstar". On 5 August 2026, Buttler became the all time leading run scorer in T20s, surpassing Kieron Pollard's tally of 14,803.

=== 2013–14 Big Bash League ===
Buttler's first experience of franchise cricket came in 2013/14 when he played for Melbourne Renegades in the 2013–14 Big Bash League season in Australia. This coincided with the buildup to the England one-day team playing in Australia at the beginning of 2014 and followed him having been with the England development squad in Perth for a month prior to the start of the competition. Buttler was initially only expected to play for Melbourne in their first two matches of the competition but this was extended due to the late arrival of Pakistani all-rounder Mohammad Hafeez, who had been called into the Pakistan Test squad. After having scored a "stunning" 61 runs against Brisbane Heat in his third match, Buttler eventually played in five Big Bash matches for Melbourne before leaving to join the England squad.

=== 2016 and 2017 Indian Premier League ===
Buttler played for Mumbai Indians in the 2016 and 2017 Indian Premier League (IPL) seasons.

=== 2017–18 Bangladesh Premier League ===
Expecting to be left out of the 2017–18 Ashes series in Australia, Buttler signed a two-year contract in August 2017 with Comilla Victorians to appear in the Bangladesh Premier League (BPL). He made his BPL debut in November 2017, scoring 48 runs from 42 balls in his second match for Comilla and recorded his first BPL half-century in his third match.

=== 2017–18 Big Bash League ===
In November 2017, Buttler was signed as an overseas player for Sydney Thunder for the Big Bash League season 7. He played in the first six games for Thunder before joining the England squad for the limited-over fixtures of England's tour of Australia. He scored 67 and 81 in separate games against Hobart Hurricanes, being named Player of the Match in the first fixture.

=== 2018 Indian Premier League ===
In January 2018, Buttler was bought by the Rajasthan Royals in the 2018 IPL auction for ₹44 million (US$470,000). Buttler had a difficult start for the Royals, making a high score of just 29 in his first seven innings. However, on being promoted to open the batting mid-tournament, his performances significantly improved. He subsequently became only the second batsman in IPL history to achieve five scores of fifty or more in consecutive matches. He made an unbeaten 95 from 60 balls against Chennai Super Kings, his highest score in the season at that time.

=== 2018–19 Big Bash League ===
Buttler again played for Sydney Thunder in the 2018–19 Big Bash League, this time alongside England teammate Joe Root. The England and Wales Cricket Board (ECB) allowed Buttler and Root to play the first half of the season, despite a busy international schedule throughout 2019.

Buttler made his highest BBL score of 89 from 54 deliveries against Hobart Hurricanes, despite a seven-wicket defeat, before making 55 in a thrilling one-run win over Perth Scorchers. Buttler departed as the tournament's leading run-scorer, with 273 from seven innings, making three half-centuries at an average of 39.00.

=== 2019 Indian Premier League ===
Rajasthan Royals retained Buttler for the 2019 IPL season. In a match between Rajasthan Royals and Punjab Kings, Buttler was controversially run out on 69 by Indian bowler Ravichandran Ashwin via 'Mankading', an act for which Ashwin was heavily criticised. Former Australian bowler and Rajasthan mentor Shane Warne called the incident a "disgraceful and low act". This is the second occasion on which Buttler has been dismissed in this fashion; the other is in an ODI match for England against Sri Lanka in 2014. In his next two matches for Rajasthan, he was dismissed for scores of just five and six but returned to form after hitting 59 from 43 balls in a fixture against Royal Challengers Bengaluru. He also made a score of 89 from 43 deliveries against Mumbai Indians, hitting 28 runs off the 13th over.

=== 2020 Indian Premier League ===
Following the rescheduling of the 2020 IPL to the autumn due to the COVID-19 pandemic, Buttler was retained by the Rajasthan Royals. He started the campaign opening the batting before moving to the middle order to aid the "balance of the team". He scored 328 runs at an average of 33 with 2 half-centuries, including a match-winning 70* against Chennai Super Kings in Sheikh Zayed Stadium.

=== 2021 Indian Premier League ===
Buttler started the IPL in batting at 4, scoring a rapid 25 in the opening game, continuing from the previous campaign. However, after Ben Stokes broke a finger in the team's first match, Buttler was promoted once again to the opening berth. On 2 May 2021, he scored his maiden IPL and T20 hundred, in 56 balls, against Sunrisers Hyderabad. His final score was 124 runs in just 64 balls and his contribution enabled Rajasthan Royals to win the game, for which he was named "Man of the Match".

=== 2022 Indian Premier League ===
In November 2021, Rajasthan Royals retained Jos Buttler for ₹10 crores ahead of the IPL Mega Auction 2022. He scored his first century of the season against Mumbai Indians. He scored his second century of the season against Kolkata Knight Riders, and third against Delhi Capitals. Buttler scored his 4th century of the season against Royal Challengers Bengaluru, which made him the first Overseas player to score 4 Hundreds in a single IPL edition and only the second player in the history of IPL after Virat Kohli . Buttler scored 39 runs in the IPL 2022 final and ended the season with a total of 863 runs, the second highest in IPL history beating David Warner's 848 in IPL 2016. Buttler secured the 2022 Orange Cap and the awards for most valuable player of the season, most sixes (45) and most fours (83) in the 2022 Edition.

=== The Hundred ===
In April 2022, Buttler was retained by the Manchester Super Giants for the 2022 season of The Hundred.

=== 2022 SA20 League ===
In August 2022, Jos Buttler was drafted by Paarl Royals, a franchise owned by Manoj Badale for US$500,000 in the inaugural season of the SA20 league. He is the highest-paid drafted player in the league along with Liam Livingstone.

=== 2023 Indian Premier League ===
Buttler was again retained by the Rajasthan Royals for the 2023 season. Buttler had a bittersweet season. He scored 392 runs in 14 game with half centuries. He also scored five ducks in the season, making him the player to be dismissed with most ducks in an IPL season.

=== 2024 Indian Premier League ===
In his 100th IPL Match, Buttler hit an unbeaten century in a man of the match performance against the Royal Challengers Bengaluru. Then against the Kolkata Knight Riders he scored another unbeaten century guiding the joint biggest run chase in the history of the IPL.

=== 2025 Indian Premier League ===
Jos Buttler was released by Rajasthan Royals ahead of the IPL 2025 mega auction. On auction day, 24 November 2024, Rajasthan Royals tried to bid back on Jos but he was finally sold to Gujarat Titans for 15.75 Crore Indian Rupees.

== Personal life ==
Buttler is a fan of English team Manchester City. On 21 October 2017, Buttler married Louise Webber. His English teammates Steven Finn and Alex Hales acted as ushers for the wedding. Their first daughter was born in April 2019, and their second daughter was born in September 2021. Their third child, a son, was born in May 2024.

Buttler was appointed Member of the Order of the British Empire (MBE) in the 2020 New Year Honours for services to cricket.

== Playing style ==
Jos Buttler is an extravagantly talented batsman with the power and range of strokes to damage any bowling attack. There may be moments, against the very best bowling, when his improvisation gets him into trouble but, so capable of unorthodoxy is he, that even the best could be discombobulated.

— George Dobell, June 2013

A skilled and experienced cricketer, Buttler has a powerful stance in the crease. During his maiden first-class century against Hampshire in 2010, he "hit the ball hard and straight", "moving his feet decisively, playing with his bat close to his body and selecting the right balls to attack". Buttler was praised for "remaining cool and composed at the crease" and for his "concentrated determination and high range of shots" during the innings. Somerset captain Marcus Trescothick suggested that Buttler could challenge teammate Craig Kieswetter's place in the England team.

Buttler's temperament in the longer forms of the game has been questioned at times as his career has developed. In 2013, he was out for 94 runs for Somerset while attempting to reach his century by hitting a six and George Dobell, writing for Cricinfo, questioned "his ability to defend and deny bowlers". Dobell praised the first half of Buttler's innings, which ensured a draw for Somerset, saying that "it showed a young man responding to his team's needs with a restrained, mature performance that exhibited a decent defence and an ability to leave and play straight" and that he had "produced some of those trademark straight drives and several powerful pulls" but felt that "it is the strokes he does not play that are as relevant as those he does".

In one day cricket, Buttler quickly established a reputation as an aggressive batsman who could take control of a game at the end of an innings. By the end of his first full-season he was producing "innings of huge promise" which were being described as "breathtaking" and "swashbuckling" and displaying "an array of explosive and innovative shots". Still a teenager, his displays in both 40 over and 20 over cricket in 2010 won him plaudits, including a description as a "supremely talented youngster" who batted with a "blend of power and sweet timing". His range of shots, including effective use of 'scoop' and 'ramp' shots over the wicket-keeper to fine leg and variations such as reverse and swivel scoop shots, mean that his game has been considered subtle rather than overly aggressive and his "stunning strokes", clean striking and "crispness when hitting" the ball along with his "audacity and adventure" have all been cited as making him an "exciting" batsman.

Despite not always being his county's first-choice wicket-keeper and reservations about the quality of his work behind the stumps, Buttler has frequently been used in that role by the England team since the beginning of 2013, especially in one-day cricket. He was installed in the wicket-keeper role ahead of the 2013 ICC Champions Trophy after Craig Kieswetter faltered in terms of his batting – Buttler's one-day batting, his potential and his ability to combine power with improvisation being seen as more important than any failings as a wicket-keeper – despite, by his own admission, his "keeping [being] a work in progress". His wicket-keeping was "seen by some as having more potential" than his main rival for the job Jonny Bairstow and England wicket-keeper coach Bruce French spoke of his "natural hands" behind the stumps.

Following Kieswetter's and Matt Prior's international retirements in 2015, Buttler became England's first-choice wicket-keeper in all formats. Whether he should play as a wicket-keeper or specialist batsman was questioned in middle of the 2015 season and Bairstow replaced him for the third ODI during Australia's 2015 tour due to Buttler's poor form with the bat throughout the Australian series. Bairstow eventually became the outright wicket-keeper for Tests in December 2015 for the series against South Africa, and Buttler was dropped from the Test team during 2016, whilst continuing to be the first-choice ODI and T20 wicket-keeper.

== Career best performances ==
As of November 2020, Buttler has scored seven first-class (two in Test matches) and 11 List A centuries, nine of which have been scored for England in One Day International matches. On 2 May 2021, he scored his maiden century in the T20 format of the game in 2021 IPL for Rajasthan Royals against Sunrisers Hyderabad.

Buttler made his maiden first-class century in May 2010, scoring 144 for Somerset against Hampshire at the Rose Bowl, Southampton. His highest Test match score of 152 was made for England against Pakistan in August 2020, at the same ground. As of November 2020, this remains Buttler's highest ever first-class score.

In limited overs cricket, Buttler's best List A and ODI score of 150 from 77 deliveries was made in February 2019 against the West Indies at the National Cricket Stadium, Grenada. This is also the highest ODI score for an Englishman against the West Indies. Buttler is yet to score a century in one-day matches in county cricket.

Buttler's highest T20 league score of 124 out from 64 balls was made for Rajasthan Royals against Sunrisers Hyderabad in the 2021 Indian Premier League at the Arun Jaitley Stadium, New Delhi and shattered the record for the highest score in the Indian Premier League (IPL) by an English player which was previously held by Jonny Bairstow. His highest Twenty20 International (T20I) score is 131 not out off 64 balls, hitting 12 fours and 8 sixes, and was achieved against India on 11 July 2026 at the Utilita Bowl cricket ground during the 5th T20I of the India tour of England.

== International Centuries ==
List of Test centuries scored by Jos Buttler
No.	Score	Opponent	Venue	Date	Result	Ref
1	106	India	Trent Bridge, Nottingham	18 August 2018	Loss	
2	152	Pakistan	Rose Bowl, Southampton	21 August 2020	Draw	

=== One Day International centuries ===
No.	Runs	Balls	Opponent	Venue	Date	Result
1	121	74	Sri Lanka	Lord's, London	31 May 2014	Loss
2	129	77	New Zealand	Edgbaston, Birmingham	9 June 2015	Won
3	116*	52	Pakistan	Dubai International Cricket Stadium, Dubai	20 November 2015	Won
4	105	76	South Africa	Mangaung Oval, Bloemfontein	3 February 2016	Won
5	100*	83	Australia	Sydney Cricket Ground, Sydney	21 January 2018	Won
6	110*	122	Australia	Old Trafford, Manchester	24 June 2018	Won
7	150	77	West Indies	National Cricket Stadium, Grenada	27 February 2019	Won
8	110*	55	Pakistan	Rose Bowl, Southampton	11 May 2019	Won
9	103	76	Pakistan	Trent Bridge, Nottingham	3 June 2019	Loss
10	162*	70	Netherlands	VRA Amsterdam Cricket Ground, Amstelveen	17 June 2022	Won
11	131	127	South Africa	De Beers Diamond Oval, Kimberley	1 February 2023	Won

=== Twenty20 International centuries ===
No.	Runs	Balls	Opponent	Venue	Date	Result
1	101*	67	Sri Lanka	Sharjah Cricket Stadium, Sharjah	1 November 2021	Won
2	131	64	India	Rose Bowl, Southampton	11 July 2026	Won

== Honours ==
- Buttler was appointed Member of the Most Excellent Order of the British Empire (MBE) in the 2020 New Year Honours for services to cricket.
- ICC Men's T20I Team of the Year: 2021.
- ICC Men's Player of the Month: November 2022.
- Somerset County Council: Chairman's Award.
- 2015 T20 Blast – Winner.
- 2017 Indian Premier League – Winner.
- 2019 ICC Cricket World Cup – Winner.
- 2022 ICC Men's T20 World Cup – Winner.

Preceded by James Taylor	Young Wisden Schools Cricketer of the Year; 2010	Succeeded by Will Vanderspar
