= Wisden Schools Cricketer of the Year =

Annual cricket award in the United Kingdom

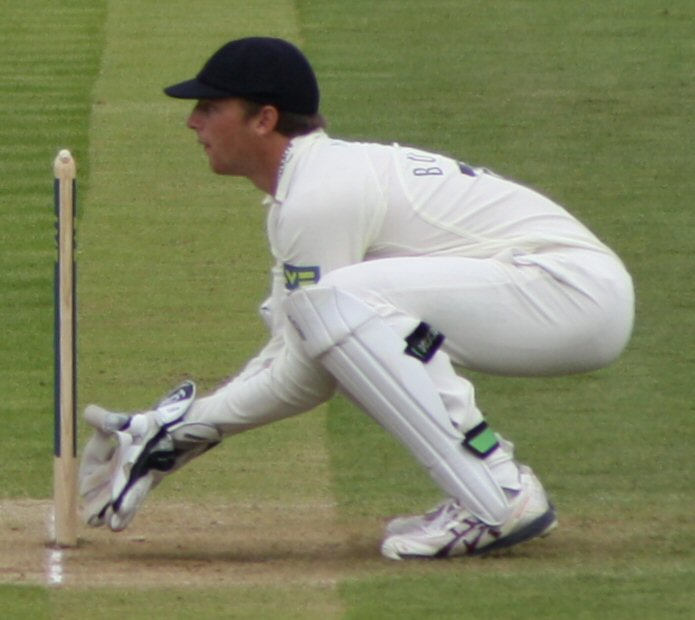
The 2010 winner, Jos Buttler has made over 400 appearances for England.

The Wisden Schools Cricketer of the Year is a cricketer selected for the honour by the annual publication Wisden Cricketers' Almanack. The decision is based upon "his or her performances in school's cricket, as reported in Wisden". Wisden has included details of schools cricket as far back as its second edition in 1865, when it carried an account of the match between Eton College and Harrow School. In 1918 and 1919, as no first-class cricket was being played due to the First World War, the five Wisden Cricketers of the Year were chosen from public schools. The first Young Wisden Cricketer of the Year was named in 2008, in the 144th edition of Wisden Cricketers' Almanack, in an effort to "help raise the profile of schools cricket, especially at state schools." The first winner was Jonny Bairstow of St Peter's School, York.

The first eight winners of the award were all batsman. Douglas Henderson partially explained the reason for this in the 2010 edition of Wisden, pointing out that restrictions on young pace bowlers restricts them to bowling no more than 21 overs per day, therefore limiting their chances of taking many wickets. (Note: The limit has since been reduced to 18 over per day.) The first three recipients of the award; Bairstow, James Taylor and Jos Buttler have gone on to represent England in Test cricket.

No award was made for the 2020 season, as the school cricket programme was reduced by the COVID-19 pandemic in the United Kingdom. To compensate, Wisden compiled a notional list of winners from 1900 to 2006, which included a number of future Test cricketers.

Following Douglas Henderson's sudden death in 2022, the award has been chosen by a panel of members of the Schools Cricket Committee (formerly the HMC Cricket Committee).

== Winners ==
Year	Recipient	School	Reason(s)	Ref
2008	Jonny Bairstow	St Peter's School, York	In eight innings for St Peter's School, York in 2007, he scored three centuries, 654 runs with an average of 218.00.	
2009	James Taylor	Shrewsbury School	Five years of consistently run-scoring for Shrewsbury School, culminating in 2008 when he scored 898 runs at an average of 179.60. He also played for England at the Under-19 World Cup.	
2010	Jos Buttler	King's College, Taunton	Scored 554 runs for King's College in 2009 at faster than a run-a-ball, and also played for Somerset, who included him in their squad for the inaugural Champions League Twenty20 competition in India, where he played against the eventual winners New South Wales Blues.	
2011	Will Vanderspar	Eton College	He scored 1,286 runs for Eton College, and captained the school in 2010, finishing as the leading run scorer on the school's circuit.	
2012	Daniel Bell-Drummond	Millfield, Street	Scored 801 runs for Millfield at an average of 133.50 in 2011, with four centuries.	
2013	Tom Abell	Taunton School	In eleven innings for Taunton School in 2012, he scored seven centuries, totalling 1,156 runs at an average of 192, and also took 19 wickets average of 15.	
2014	Tom Kohler-Cadmore	Malvern College	Scored 1,409 runs for Malvern College amassed three scores over 150 including a top score of 186 v Oundle and averaged over 100 in 2013, and also made his debut for Worcestershire, scoring 47 against Bangladesh A on his debut.	
2015	Dylan Budge	Woodhouse Grove School, Leeds	Scored 731 runs for Woodhouse at an average of 121 in 2014.	
2016	Ben Waring	Felsted School	Left-arm spinner who took 68 wickets at an average of 9.23 for Felsted in 2015.	
2017	AJ Woodland	St Edward's School, Oxford	Scored over 1,200 runs for St Edward's in all formats of cricket as a left-handed opening batsman.	
2018	Teddie Casterton	Royal Grammar School, High Wycombe	Scored 1,423 runs from 21 innings for RGS at an average of close to 90.	
2019	Nathan Tilley	Reed's School, Cobham	For his voracious appetite for runs: in 2018, four of his six centuries reached 150, and he averaged 139.	
2020	Tawanda Muyeye	Eastbourne College	Scoring 1,000 runs, including a double-hundred. Recognised as a player of immense presence, a batsman destined to empty bars and “the best off-spinner of his age group in the county”.	
2022	Jacob Bethell	Rugby School	Jacob Bethell batted seven times (twice not out) in compiling 654 runs for Rugby, and averaged a phenomenal 130. He also scored a double-hundred against historic rivals Marlborough.	
2023	Oliver Cox	Malvern College	Oliver Cox scored 1392 runs at nearly 70 with 3 centuries and a highest score of 170*. He scored against consistently strong opponents and was awarded a contract with Worcestershire.	
2024	Ollie Sykes	Tonbridge School	Oliver Sykes scored 935 runs, including 4 hundreds with a highest score of 157 vs Harrow as well as taking 30 wickets on a very challenging circuit including fixtures against 3 southern hemisphere schools.	
2025	Aryaman Varma	Eton College		

== See also ==
- Cricket Writers' Club Young Cricketer of the Year
