= Tom Abell =

English cricketer

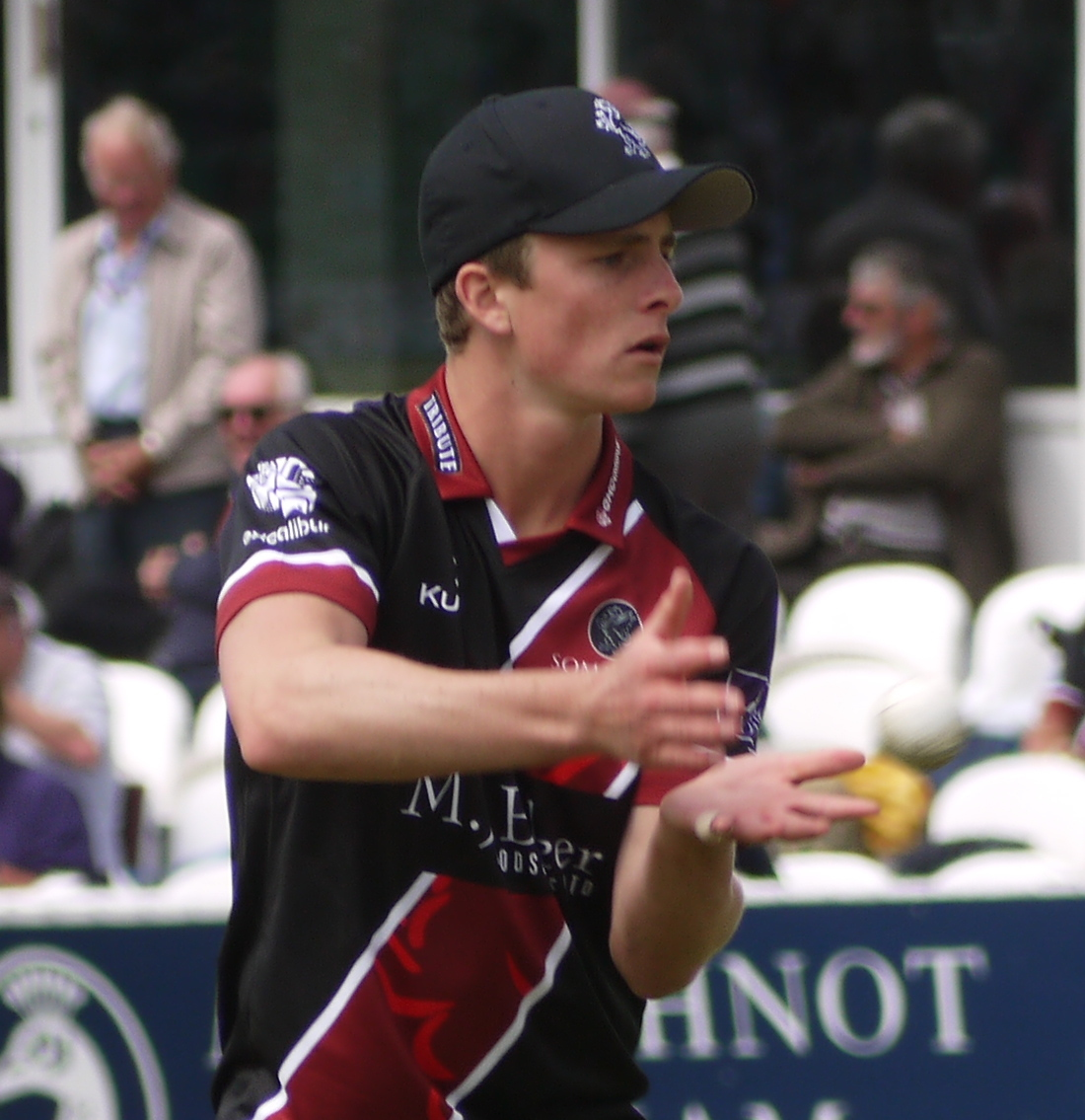
- Abell representing Somerset in 2015

Personal information
- Full name: Thomas Benjamin Abell
- Born: 5 March 1994 (age 32); Taunton, Somerset, England
- Height: 5 ft 11 in (1.80 m)
- Batting: Right-handed
- Bowling: Right-arm medium
- Role: Top order batter

Domestic team information
- Years: Team
- 2014–present: Somerset (squad no. 28)
- 2019/20: Rangpur Rangers
- 2021: Birmingham Phoenix
- 2021/22: Brisbane Heat
- 2022/23: Dambulla Aura
- 2022/23–2024/25: Sunrisers Eastern Cape
- 2023–2025: Welsh Fire
- 2024: Dubai Capitals
- 2024: Lahore Qalandars
- 2025/26: Sharjah Warriorz
- 2026: Southern Brave
- FC debut: 15 August 2014 Somerset v Warwickshire
- LA debut: 29 July 2015 Somerset v Durham

Career statistics
Competition	FC	LA	T20
Matches	155	27	189
Runs scored	9,627	649	3,979
Batting average	38.97	30.90	28.83
100s/50s	24/47	1/1	1/18
Top score	307	106	101*
Balls bowled	3,431	49	60
Wickets	64	2	2
Bowling average	31.62	14.00	50.00
5 wickets in innings	0	0	0
10 wickets in match	0	0	0
Best bowling	4/39	2/19	1/11
Catches/stumpings	138/–	8/–	102/–
- Source: CricketArchive (subscription required), 27 September 2026

Thomas Benjamin Abell (born 5 March 1994) is an English first-class cricketer who plays for Somerset County Cricket Club.

Primarily a right-handed batter, he also bowls right-arm medium pace. Abell enjoyed a prolific cricket record while at Taunton School, where in 2012 he accumulated seven centuries and passed 50 in every innings he played at an average of 193, and he was named 2013 Young Wisden Schools Cricketer of the Year. He made his Somerset first-class debut against Warwickshire in August 2014, scoring 95 in his first innings. He was appointed Somerset's County Championship skipper for the 2017 season.

== Career ==
=== Early life and career ===
Abell was born in Taunton, and educated at the independent Taunton School. He made his debut for the Taunton School's 1st XI team aged 14, where he became the youngest cricketer at the school to reach the 1000-run landmark at the age of just 16. By the time he left school he had scored a record 3,630 runs for the first XI, and as captain of the first team he finished the 2012 season with 1,156 runs at an average of 193 accumulating seven centuries and passing 50 in every innings he played, and also took 19 wickets average of 15. His performances led him to be named 2013 Young Wisden Schools Cricketer of the Year, and received the Wetherell Award, presented by The Cricket Society to the leading all rounder in School's Cricket, in 2012. As well as starring for the Taunton School cricket team, he also captained the school hockey team to a second consecutive undefeated season, and also represented the school rugby, rugby sevens and indoor hockey, in which the school reached the semi-finals at the national finals. His all-round sporting successes led him to be nominated for "Male Pupil of the Year" at the Aviva/Telegraph School Sport Matters Awards, where he finished as runner-up to British Olympic diver Tom Daley. While at school he also had a trial for the England men's national hockey team at under-16 level.

Abell played extensively for Somerset's youth teams, appearing at Under-14, Under-15, Under-17 and Under-19 level. He made his senior club cricket debut for Taunton in the 2009 season, aged just 15, scoring an unbeaten 22. At the age of 17, Abell scored 150 in a losing cause as he attempted to chase down a total in excess of 300 against Warminster, in 2013 he scored 768 runs for Taunton at an average of 76.80 and followed this up, in 2014 with 770 runs for Taunton in the West of England Premier League, with a highest score of 185* at an average of 128.33 as he helped the club earn promotion. Abell made his first appearances for the Somerset Second XI in 2010, Abell was named Second XI player of the year in 2013, after he amassed 1,234 runs at an average of 40.13, including four centuries and five scores of 50 or more.

After leaving Taunton School, Abell went on to study a degree in Flexible Combined Honours, Sports Science and French, at the University of Exeter. While at university he led the men's first team to the finals of the BUCS outdoor championships, and the indoor league title.

=== First-team breakthrough ===
He made his Somerset first-class debut against Warwickshire in August 2014, having been called up to the team as a late replacement for the county's overseas player Alviro Petersen who had suffered a knee injury. He scored 95 in his first innings, and was the last man out for Somerset with the total on 286, narrowly missing out on the becoming the first Somerset-born player, since Harold Gimblett in 1935, to score a century on their County Championship debut. Abell maintained his place in the Somerset team until the end of the season scoring two further half-centuries, scoring exactly 50 against Middlesex, and 75 in Somerset's final match of the season away at champions Yorkshire, he finished the season with 292 runs at an average of 41. At the end of the season Abell was one of four Somerset players to be awarded a new one-year contract.

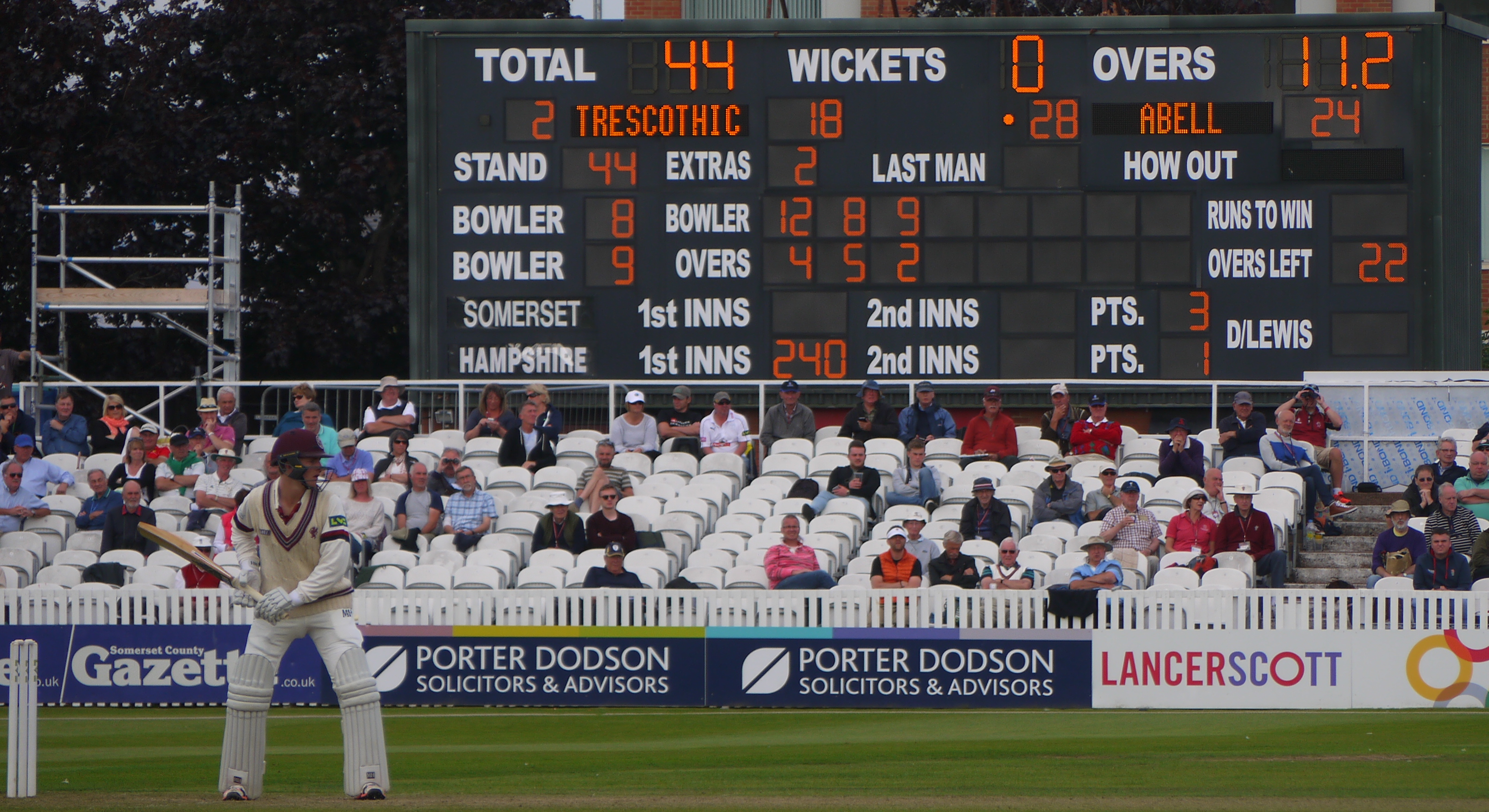
Abell batting against Hampshire, in the innings in which he made his maiden first-class century.

After breaking into the Somerset team batting at number four, Abell spent the 2015 season as Marcus Trescothick's regular opening partner. His season began poorly with a second ball duck in Somerset's opening match against the Durham MCC University team. Having missed games during the early part of the season due to university commitments, Abell made his first half-century of the season against defending champions Yorkshire, on 25 May 2015, he also took his maiden first-class wicket in the match having Yorkshire bowler Jack Brooks caught behind for 24, he ended the innings with bowling analysis of 1/11 from 4.4 overs. In early June 2015, Abell was awarded a new four-year contract extension with Somerset. On 15 June 2015, Abell carried his bat through Somerset's innings against Nottinghamshire scoring 76 from 150 balls out of the Somerset's total of 200. Abell also scored a further half century in Somerset's successful fourth innings chase of 401, the second highest in the county's history, to record his first victory in a Somerset shirt. He followed this up with a further half century away at Hampshire in Somerset's next Championship game, and scored an unbeaten 21 to guide Somerset to a nine-wicket victory. On 29 July 2015, Abell made his list A debut for Somerset against Durham, scoring 23 in Somerset's seven wicket defeat. He made his maiden list A half century against Yorkshire, scoring 80 from 112 balls as Somerset chased down 178 to win by six wickets. Somerset were knocked out of the 2015 Royal London One-Day Cup in the group stage, with Abell scoring 202 runs in the competition at an average of 33. Having suffered a number of near misses, Abell scored his maiden first-class century for Somerset against Hampshire, on 10 September 2015. He scored 131 from 203 balls, in a partnership of 272 with Marcus Trescothick. At the end of the 2015 season Abell won the LV= Breakthrough Player Award, for his performances in the County Championship. He ended the season with 726 runs in the Championship at an average of 36, with one century and five half centuries. Abell spent the 2015–16 winter playing grade cricket for Fremantle District Cricket Club in Western Australia, and had a highly successful winter twice winning the Kookaburra player of the round award, in total across all formats he scored 641 runs at an average of 40 while he took 21 wickets with the ball at an average of 18.

The 2016 season saw Abell continue to open in the County Championship with Marcus Trescothick with the club's new captain, former Australian Test match opener, Chris Rogers signed by the club to bat at number 3. After a disastrous campaign for Somerset in the 2016 t20 Blast, Abell made his Twenty20 debut in a much changed team for their final group match against Hampshire on 29 July 2016. Abell batted at number 5, scoring seven runs before being dismissed by Liam Dawson.

=== Somerset captaincy ===
On 21 December 2016, Abell was appointed Somerset County Cricket Club captain ahead of the 2017 season.

He resigned as Somerset captain in December 2023.

=== T20 franchise career ===
In December 2021, he was signed by the Karachi Kings following the players' draft for the 2022 Pakistan Super League. In April 2022, he was bought by the Birmingham Phoenix for the 2022 season of The Hundred.

=== International career ===
In February 2023, Abell was named in England's One Day International (ODI) and Twenty20 International (T20I) squad for their series against Bangladesh. Later he was ruled out of the squad due to side strain.

Preceded by Daniel Bell-Drummond	Young Wisden Schools Cricketer of the Year; 2013	Succeeded by Tom Kohler-Cadmore
Preceded by Chris Rogers	Somerset County Cricket Club captain 2017–2023	Succeeded by Lewis Gregory
