= Will Vanderspar =

English cricketer (born 1991)

Personal information
- Full name: William Gordon Rufus Vanderspar
- Born: 6 October 1991 (age 35); Camden, London, England
- Batting: Right-handed
- Bowling: Right arm fast
- Role: All-rounder

Domestic team information
- Years: Team
- 2013–2014: Leeds/Bradford MCCU
- FC debut: 5 April 2013 Leeds/Bradford MCCU v Yorkshire
- Last FC: 6 November 2019 MCC v Nepal

Career statistics
Competition	First-class
Matches	5
Runs scored	222
Batting average	31.71
100s/50s	0/2
Top score	60*
Balls bowled	149
Wickets	4
Bowling average	22.00
5 wickets in innings	0
10 wickets in match	0
Best bowling	2/52
Catches/stumpings	2/–
- Source: CricketArchive, 9 November 2019

William Gordon Rufus Vanderspar (born 6 October 1991) is an English cricketer who played for Leeds/Bradford MCCU and Middlesex 2nd XI. He is a right-handed batsman and right arm fast bowler. He enjoyed a prolific school career at Eton College and he was named 2011 Young Wisden Schools Cricketer of the Year. He made his first-class debut for Leeds/Bradford MCCU against Yorkshire, on 5 April 2013.

He is captain of the Eton Ramblers team in the Cricketer Cup, and holder of the highest score made for that team in that competition – 169 not out – against the Old Bedfordians.

Preceded by Jos Buttler	Young Wisden Schools Cricketer of the Year; 2011	Succeeded by Daniel Bell-Drummond
