= Tom Kohler-Cadmore =

English cricketer (born 1994)

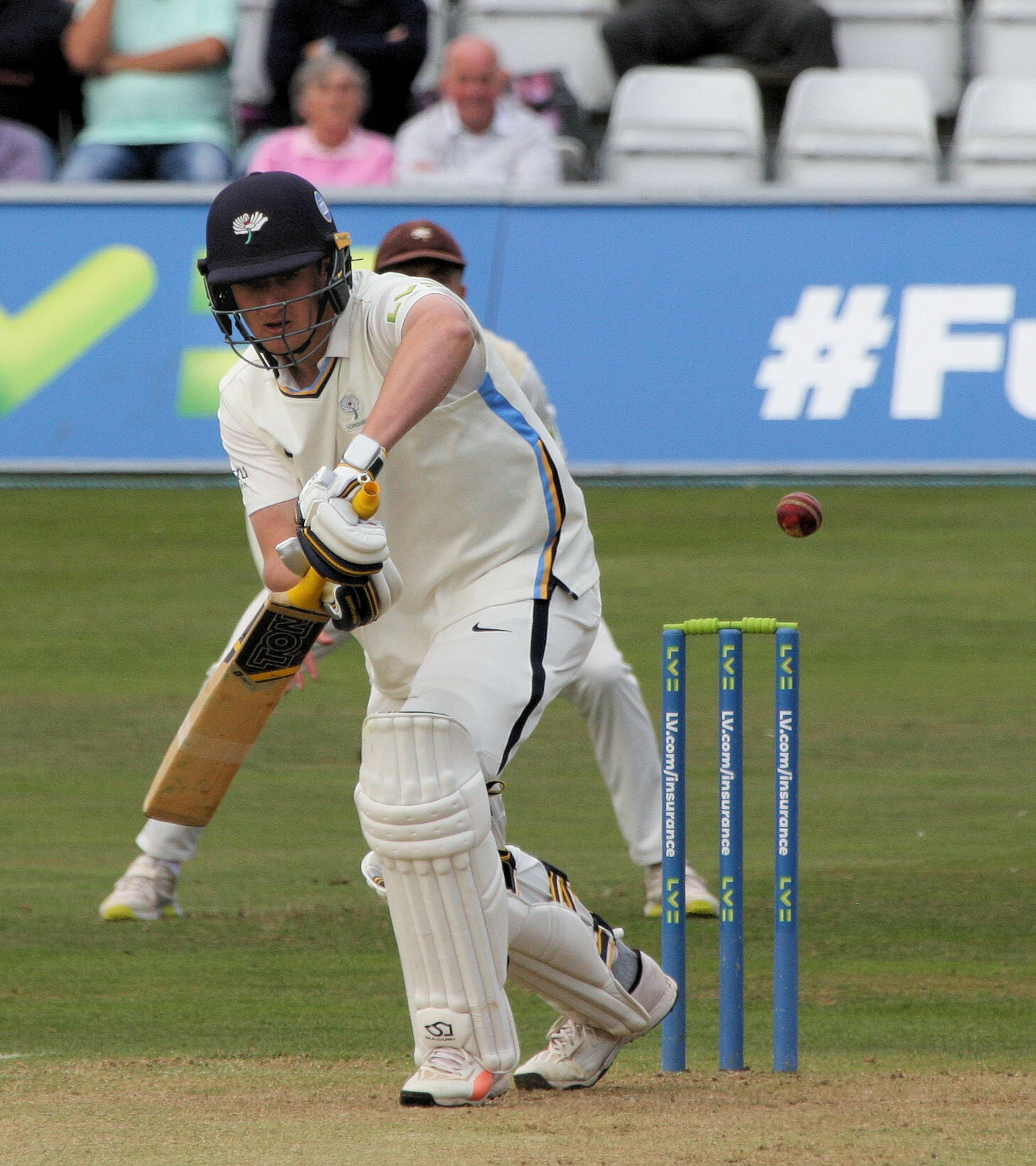
- Tom Kohler-Cadmore in 2021

Personal information
- Full name: Tom Kohler-Cadmore
- Born: 19 August 1994 (age 32); Chatham, Kent, England
- Nickname: Pepsi, TKC
- Height: 6 ft 2 in (1.88 m)
- Batting: Right-handed
- Bowling: Right-arm off break
- Role: Batsman

Domestic team information
- Years: Team
- 2013–2017: Worcestershire (squad no. 32)
- 2017–2022: Yorkshire (squad no. 32)
- 2018: Quetta Gladiators
- 2021–2025: Peshawar Zalmi (squad no. 32)
- 2021: Northern Superchargers
- 2021–2022: Jaffna Kings
- 2022–2023: Trent Rockets
- 2023: Rangpur Riders
- 2023–present: Somerset (squad no. 32)
- 2023/24: Sydney Thunder
- 2024–2025/26: Sharjah Warriorz
- 2024: Rajasthan Royals (squad no. 32)
- 2024–2026: Welsh Fire
- First-class debut: 6 April 2014 Worcestershire v Hampshire
- List A debut: 16 August 2013 Worcestershire v Bangladesh A

Career statistics
Competition	FC	LA	T20
Matches	110	56	283
Runs scored	5,704	1,808	6,882
Batting average	33.55	34.11	27.63
100s/50s	14/24	3/10	1/46
Top score	176	164	127
Catches/stumpings	144/1	29/–	146/5
- Source: ESPNcricinfo, 27 September 2026

Tom Kohler-Cadmore (born 19 August 1994) is an English professional cricketer who plays for Somerset. He is a right-handed batsman who also bowls right-arm off spin.

== Biography ==
Having come through the Yorkshire age-group system, Kohler-Cadmore left to complete his education at Malvern College where he was named 2014 Young Wisden Schools Cricketer of the Year. After leaving Malvern College, Kohler-Cadmore made his debut for Worcestershire in August 2013 against a touring Bangladesh A side. On 20 May 2016, at the age of 21, Kohler-Cadmore scored 127 runs from 54 balls for Worcestershire against Durham in the 2016 NatWest t20 Blast. It was the highest individual total for a Worcestershire player in a Twenty20 match.

In June 2017, Yorkshire announced that Kohler-Cadmore had signed a contract of an undisclosed length to rejoin them ahead of the 2018 season. On 8 June 2017, Worcestershire announced that they had mutually agreed to terminate his contract to allow him to immediately join Yorkshire. He had been left out of the previous match.

In May 2019, the England and Wales Cricket Board (ECB) withdrew Kohler-Cadmore from the England Lions' squad, after he was named during Alex Hepburn's rape trial. Hepburn was found guilty of rape, and although the judge said that Kohler-Cadmore "did nothing wrong", the ECB were concerned about the disrespectful messages about women that had been exchanged.

On 29 May 2020, Kohler-Cadmore was named in a 55-man group of players to begin training ahead of international fixtures starting in England following the COVID-19 pandemic.

On 1 December 2021, Kohler-Cadmore made the highest individual score in T10 history, scoring 96 off just 39 balls against Bangla Tigers in the Abu Dhabi T10 League. In April 2022, he was bought by the Trent Rockets for the 2022 season of The Hundred.

On 20 June 2022, Kohler-Cadmore agreed a three-year contract with Somerset County Cricket Club ahead of the 2023 season.

== Personal life ==
Kohler-Cadmore's mother Annette is German. He has an elder brother named Ben. Ben acquired German citizenship in 2024 and has represented Germany national cricket team. The German Cricket Federation attempted to convince Tom to follow the lead of his brother in a bid to qualify for an ICC Men's T20 World Cup for the first time.

Preceded by Tom Abell	Young Wisden Schools Cricketer of the Year; 2014	Succeeded by Dylan Budge
