= James Taylor (cricketer, born 1990) =

English cricketer

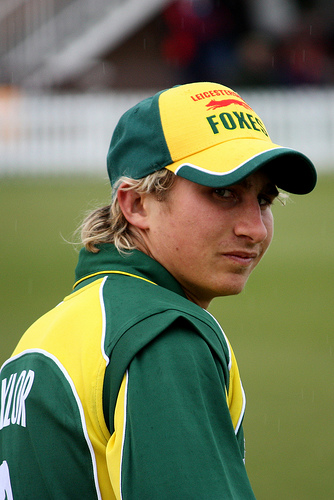
- Taylor playing for Leicestershire in 2009

Personal information
- Full name: James William Arthur Taylor
- Born: 6 January 1990 (age 36); Burrough on the Hill, Leicestershire, England
- Nickname: Titch
- Height: 5 ft 4 in (1.63 m)
- Batting: Right-handed
- Bowling: Right-arm leg break
- Role: Batsman

International information
- National side: England (2011–2016)
- Test debut (cap 653): 2 August 2012 v South Africa
- Last Test: 22 January 2016 v South Africa
- ODI debut (cap 222): 25 August 2011 v Ireland
- Last ODI: 20 November 2015 v Pakistan
- ODI shirt no.: 4

Domestic team information
- Years: Team
- 2008–2011: Leicestershire (squad no. 9)
- 2012–2016: Nottinghamshire (squad no. 4)

Career statistics
Competition	Test	ODI	FC	LA
Matches	7	27	139	136
Runs scored	312	887	9,306	5,365
Batting average	26.00	42.23	46.06	53.11
100s/50s	0/2	1/7	20/47	15/30
Top score	76	101	291	146*
Balls bowled	–	–	228	138
Wickets	–	–	0	5
Bowling average	–	–	–	34.00
5 wickets in innings	–	–	–	0
10 wickets in match	–	–	–	0
Best bowling	–	–	–	4/61
Catches/stumpings	7/–	7/–	91/–	30/–
- Source: ESPNcricinfo, 12 April 2016

James William Arthur Taylor (born 6 January 1990) is a former English cricketer and cricket selector who played for Leicestershire, Nottinghamshire and England. A right-handed batsman and occasional right-arm leg break bowler, Taylor made his debut in first-class cricket in 2008 for Leicestershire and made major impressions in his first county seasons. He was noted as a fine fielder in the covers. He became the youngest Leicestershire one-day centurion and first-class double centurion. In 2009, Taylor also became the youngest player in Leicestershire's history to score 1,000 championship runs in a season. A promising talent in his 34 appearances for England, Taylor was forced into retirement at just 26 years of age due to a previously undiagnosed heart condition.

Having represented England at under-19 level and captained the England Lions, Taylor made his One Day International (ODI) debut for England in August 2011. In December 2011, Taylor signed a contract to play for Nottinghamshire and the following summer he made his England Test debut when he faced South Africa at Headingley becoming the 653rd man to play Test cricket for England and the first born in the 1990s.

A serious heart condition, arrhythmogenic right ventricular cardiomyopathy (ARVC), forced him to retire from all cricket in April 2016. Two years after his retirement he was appointed as a selector for the England team.

== Early life ==
James Taylor was born in Burrough on the Hill, a small village in Leicestershire. His father, Steve, was a National Hunt jockey until injury forced him to retire and he is now a race starter.

Taylor attended Maidwell Hall and then Shrewsbury School where he studied for his A-levels and played for their cricket team.

== Cricket playing career ==
Standing 5 feet 4 inches tall, Taylor is known for his diminutive height and is one of the shortest cricketers to have played English county cricket. He believes that his batting is not weakened by his height and has said "It's good for hooking, and less can go wrong with my feet movement. I use it to my advantage as I like to cut and pull."

=== Debut and beginnings ===
In his early teens, Taylor had links to the Worcestershire academy and played for his local team Loughborough Town and Shrewsbury School. As an 18-year-old he made the headlines for Loughborough Town for becoming only the second batsmen to score a double-century in the top flight of the Everards League, and setting a record for the highest individual score for the club when he made 202 not out.

At the age of 18, Taylor was included in Leicestershire's 12-man squad to face Worcestershire at New Road in April 2008. At the time he was still studying for his A-levels but was given permission to play. Leicestershire coach, Tim Boon, said that whether Taylor played depended on the pitch and if it merited an extra batsman. Taylor was selected and batted at seven and scored eight runs before being trapped leg before wicket (lbw) in his only innings by Kabir Ali. The game ended in a draw, as both teams were frustrated by the weather. Two months later he made his Twenty20 (T20) debut along with teammate Sam Cliff in a seven-wicket defeat against Derbyshire. Despite two late victories, including a win in the return fixture against Derbyshire at Grace Road where Taylor contributed 10, Leicestershire finished bottom of their group in the 2008 Twenty20 Cup. In a three-day tour match against Bangladesh A as part of their 2008 tour of England, Taylor made only his second first-class appearance. The match ended in a draw and Taylor made his maiden half-century of 51 from 109 balls before being caught off Shakib Al Hasan. Taylor finished his one-day season with two Natwest pro40 games against Derbyshire and Surrey. He top scored with 43 not out in a narrow six-run victory against Derbyshire and hit 37 in a loss against Surrey before being caught off youngster Stuart Meaker to end his Leicestershire season on a high. Taylor was awarded the Young Wisden Schools Cricketer of the Year for his 898 runs for Shrewsbury School in 2008, at an average of 179.60. The award also recognised his Youth International appearances and his County matches.

=== 2009 – Breakthrough ===
Taylor played for Leicestershire against the West Indies as part of their 2009 tour of England but struggled, recording scores of just four and five in a drawn three-day match. Taylor was selected to play in his first County Championship match of 2009 against Middlesex on 28 April. In the second innings he scored his maiden first-class century, in his seventh game scoring 122 not out to help save the match and earn a draw. He followed this with a Man-of-the-Match performance in Leicestershire's victory in the Friends Provident Trophy against Worcestershire on 12 May. Taylor achieved his maiden one-day century, scoring 101 before being run out by Matthew Mason. This performance garnered much media attention and saw him become Leicestershire's youngest ever player to score a one-day century, taking the record from former England and Leicestershire player David Gower. Leicestershire missed qualification for the second round of the 2009 Twenty20 Cup by one point. In ten matches, Taylor scored 205 runs with a highest score of 41 not out. On 1 August Taylor scored an unbeaten double-century against Surrey, scoring 207 not out, spending seven hours at the crease, whilst sharing an unbeaten partnership of 230 runs with Jacques Du Toit who also made a century as Leicestershire declared on 593/5. In the process Taylor became the youngest Leicestershire player to score a double-century.

In a match against Essex at Chelmsford, Taylor scored his third first-class century of his career with a knock of 112 not out in the first innings, as well as scoring a further 62 in the second to earn a draw for Leicestershire. The knock was praised in particular for his play and survival against the spin of Pakistan international bowler Danish Kaneria who claimed eight wickets in Leicestershire's first innings and twelve in the match on a spinning pitch. In the second innings of the match Taylor surpassed 1,000 runs for the season making him the youngest player to achieve this feat for Leicestershire. In 17 first-class matches for Leicestershire in 2009 Taylor scored 1,207 runs, hitting three centuries and six half-centuries at an average of 57.47, making him the sixth-highest run-scorer in Division Two that season. Despite, Taylor's efforts Leicestershire still finished at the bottom of the Division, making it a disappointing season where eleven of the sixteen games were drawn. In September he was named the Cricket Writers' Club Young Cricketer of the Year, ahead of international all-rounder Stuart Broad, and the following month he was named the Professional Cricketers' Association Young Player of the Year. Taylor's breakthrough season helped him gain inclusion in the winter England Performance Programme (EPP), and he was named in the England Lions squad to travel to the UAE in January 2010. While part of the EPP Taylor received coaching from Dene Hills and Graham Gooch. In November 2009, he signed a three-year contract extension with Leicestershire keeping him at the club until 2012.

=== 2010 ===
Leicestershire began the 2010 County Championship with a six-wicket win against Northamptonshire, Taylor contributing 88 in the first innings. He then went through a poor run, not scoring above 50 in the County Championship for six games. In May, in a Pro40 match against Warwickshire he hit 92 not out in 77 balls in a losing cause in a rain affected match. In the County Championship, Taylor returned to form hitting the second unbeaten double-century of his career with a total of 206 not out against Middlesex. The 360-run partnership he shared with teammate Andrew McDonald is a record fourth-wicket partnership for Leicestershire and it is 30 runs short of the all-time Leicestershire partnership. The pair took just 73 overs to compile the runs and it was the first time in the 2010 season that Leicestershire were able to gain all five batting points. In June, Taylor hit his then highest T20 score, he scored 60 from 42 balls in a nine-wicket loss to Yorkshire.

Later the same month Taylor hit successive T20 half-centuries against Lancashire and Yorkshire, scoring 61 and 62 not out respectively, beating his previous highest score in the format. Taylor's T20 form continued as six days later he hit another unbeaten half-century against Nottinghamshire. On 25 July Taylor made his second List A century against Warwickshire. Taylor made 103 not out in a losing cause, and recorded his best one-day bowling figures of four wickets for the concession of 61 runs (4/61). On 9 August, Taylor hit his fifth first-class century, and his third against Middlesex, as he hit 106 not out in a drawn match. Taylor ended the season with his sixth century, this time against Northamptonshire as he hit 156 before being caught off the bowling of David Burton. Taylor finished the season with 1,095 runs in 18 first-class matches at an average of 43.80. As in the previous season, Taylor was selected for the England Lions winter tour.

=== 2011 ===
Taylor played in the first game of Leicestershire's 2011 County Championship season against Glamorgan scoring 45 and 14 as Leicestershire won by 89 runs. In April, Taylor played in a university match against Loughborough where he scored his third double century with a score of 237, making it his highest first-class score. With teammate Shiv Thakor put on a record 330 runs for the fifth wicket meaning that Taylor now holds Leicestershire records for the fourth and fifth wicket partnerships. Thakor was quick to acknowledge Taylor for his calming influence on him. On 1 May, Taylor scored his third one-day century, a score of 101 against Warwickshire before being bowled by Chris Woakes. His next considerable contribution for Leicestershire was a County Championship game against Kent where he made scores of 49 and 96 in a Leicester defeat.

In 2011, Taylor's commitments to the England Lions meant he was sometimes unavailable to play for Leicestershire. Taylor was appointed captain of the England Lions for the 2011 series against Sri Lanka A team. Impressive performances in the series, including an innings of 168 not out, meant that many were calling for Taylor to be elevated up to the full squad when Jonathan Trott was injured in the second Test against India, although in the end Ravi Bopara was preferred by the selectors. Taylor was not too disheartened and on 12 August made 106 whilst captaining the England Lions to victory against Sri Lanka in a one-day match. Taylor was the subject of a controversial approach from Warwickshire to try and sign him. Leicestershire's captain, Matthew Hoggard, criticised the approach as "rude" and accusing Warwickshire of using their money to attract players. In August 2011, Taylor scored the tenth century of his first-class career in a loss against Glamorgan, he scored 127 not out in the first innings before Leicestershire declared on 309/7, still 83 runs behind Glamorgan to try and force a result.

On 27 August, Leicestershire competed in the 2011 Friends Life t20 finals day. Taylor scored 19 runs from 23 balls in the semi-final against Lancashire, the game went to a Super Over which Leicestershire won. In the final against Somerset, Taylor scored 18 not out from 15 balls to help Leicestershire claim the trophy. That season he scored 1,602 first-class runs from 17 matches at an average of 55.24. As well as Warwickshire, Nottinghamshire expressed an interest in signing Taylor. Hoping to keep the batsman, Leicestershire offered him an extension of his contract which was due to expire at the end of the 2012 season but in December it was announced that Taylor had signed a three-year contract with Nottinghamshire.

=== 2012 ===
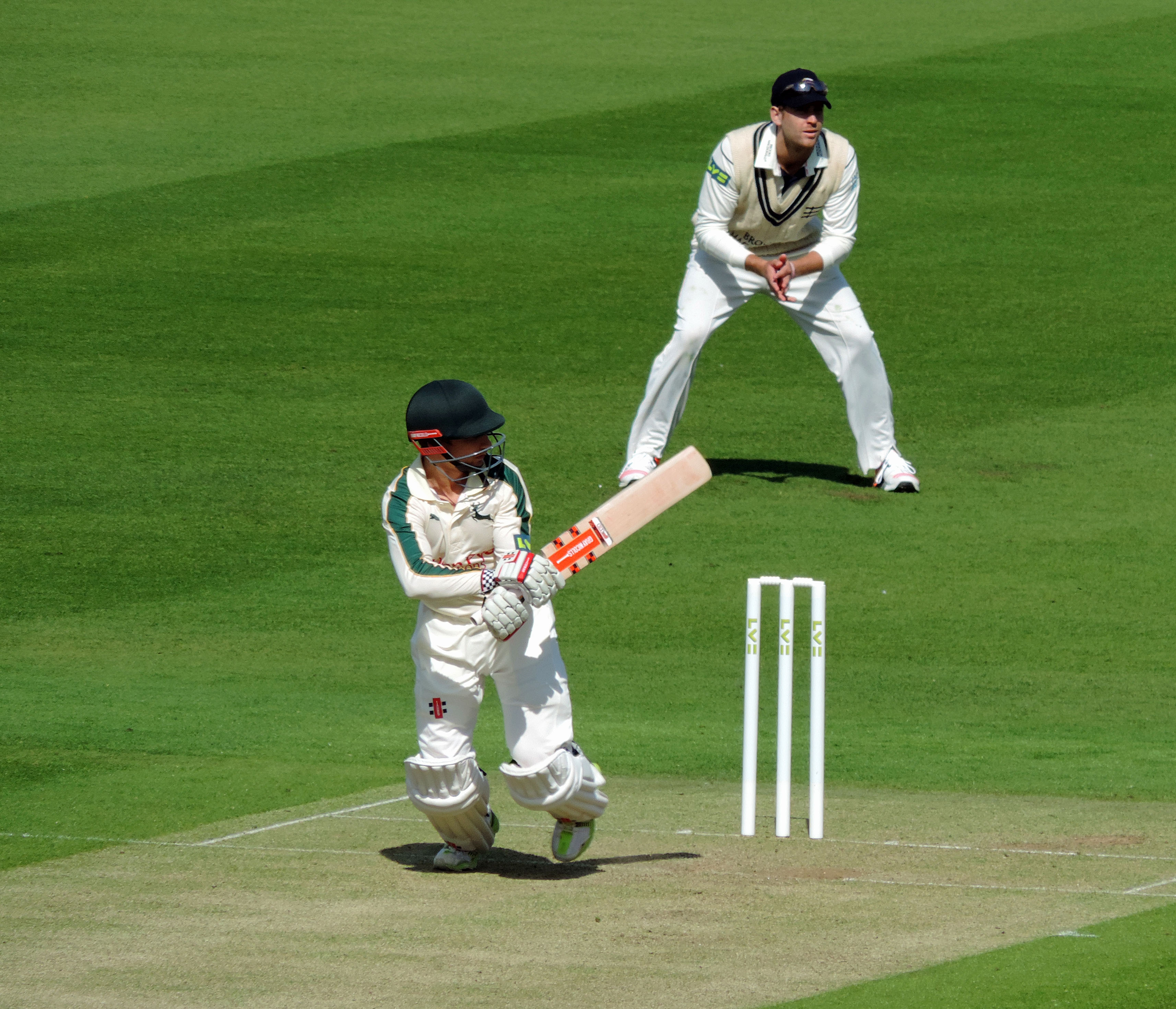
Taylor batting for Nottinghamshire at Lord's in 2015

Following his move to Nottinghamshire, Taylor endured a tricky start to a season in which poor weather and low scores prevailed. Although he scored a century as captain for the England Lions against the West Indies, his maiden County Championship ton for his new county did not come until 28 July against Sussex.

=== Youth international career and England Lions ===
Taylor was first selected for the England Under-19 cricket team whilst at Worcestershire as part of the performance program in September 2007 to play one-day matches against second XI teams. Taylor top-scored with 65 not out in a victory for England against Gloucestershire second XI. He was then selected in a tri-nations U-19 series against Pakistan and Sri Lanka. England missed out on reaching the final, which was eventually won by Pakistan, Taylor hit his highest score of 43 against Sri Lanka in an English defeat. In February 2008 Taylor was selected to participate in the 2008 ICC Under-19 Cricket World Cup, held in Malaysia. Despite a poor campaign by England, Taylor scored 200 runs in the series with a top score of 52 not out against Ireland U-19 in a 10-wicket victory, opening with Billy Godleman. In July 2008, Taylor was chosen again to face New Zealand U-19 in five one day matches. As well as being chosen to play in the 2009 England U-19 tour of South Africa. England played two Youth Test matches, five one-day matches and two T20 Youth matches. England were defeated in all three genres of the game. Taylor did however secure a win for England in the third ODI as he scored 85 to claw England a way back into the series at 1–2.

Taylor was first selected for the England Lions in February 2010 to play in the UAE against Pakistan A. Taylor scored 61 in the second one-day fixture, helping England to a three wicket victory and levelling the series at 1–1. Taylor played two matches for the Lions in June 2010 against India A hitting 24 and 19 not out. In February 2011 Taylor was picked for the England Lions, who had been invited by the West Indies Cricket Board to participate in the Regional Four Day Competition. Taylor enjoyed a successful series scoring 527 runs from six matches for the Lions, including his seventh first-class century. In May 2011, Taylor represented England Lions in a tour match against Sri Lanka at the County Ground, Derby. Taylor opened the batting hitting 76 in the first innings. For the August 2011 Sri Lanka A series, Taylor was appointed captain of the England Lions at the age of 21. In the four-day game against Sri Lanka, Taylor was in good form, making scores of 76 and 98 as the match ended in a draw. In the first one-day match against Sri Lanka A, Taylor again impressed hitting a match winning century, smashing 106 from 120 balls in an England victory putting more pressure on the England selectors. Sri Lanka won the second by 10 wickets taking the series to a decider. Taylor starred in the deciding match, scoring his highest List A score of 111, and the fifth century of his career, as England won by 135 runs. When the Lions toured Bangladesh in January 2012, Taylor was again chosen as captain. He scored 24, 0, 26, 13, 1 and 65* in the one day series.

=== International playing career ===
==== 2011–13 Ireland and South Africa ====
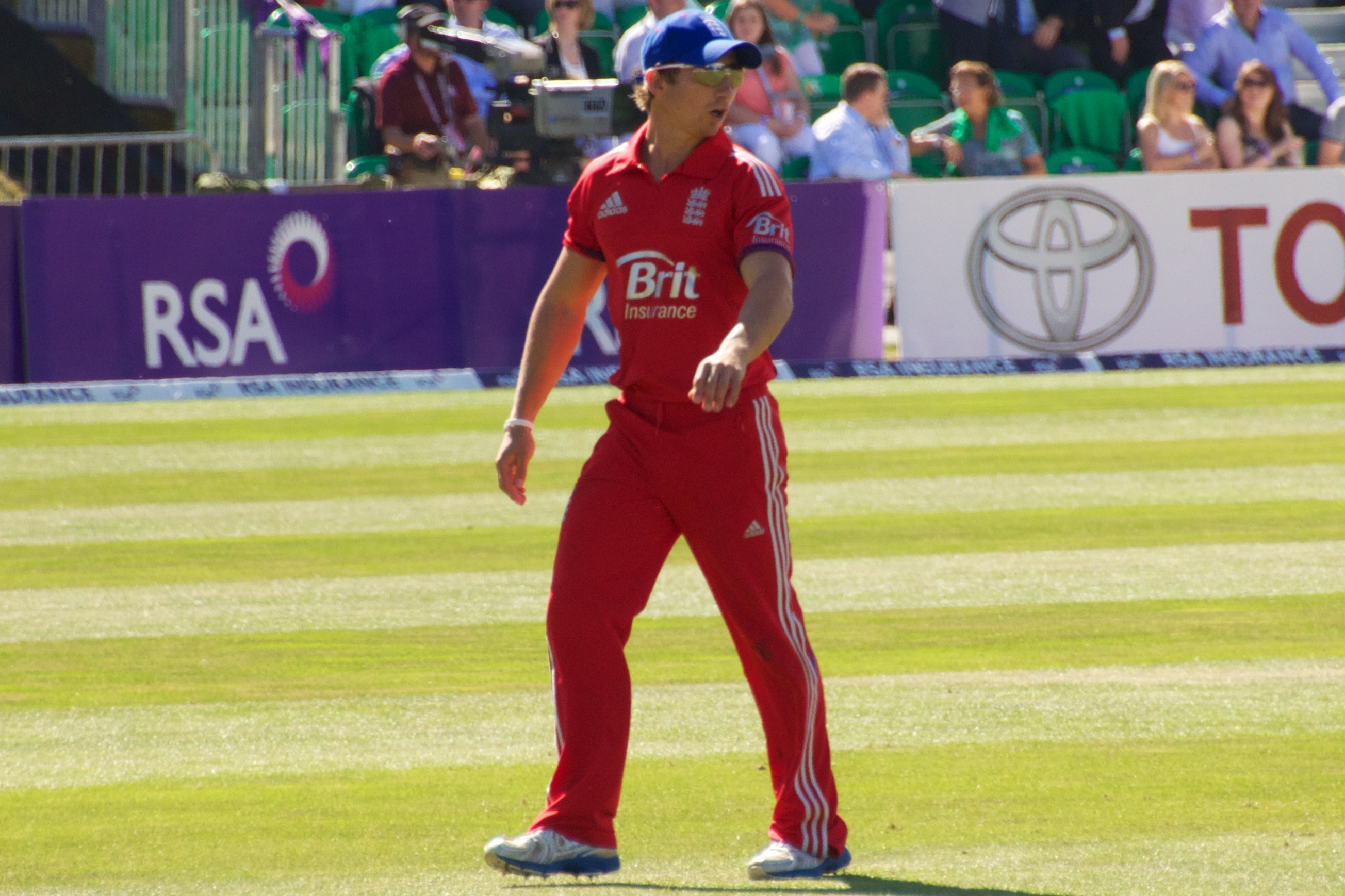
James Taylor in the field for England in the ODI against Ireland at Malahide Cricket Club Ground in September 2013

Taylor was included in the England ODI squad for the match against Ireland in August was 2011. England fielded a largely inexperienced side and he debuted alongside Ben Stokes and Scott Borthwick. Taylor contributed a single run to England's 11-run victory in a rain-affected match.

He was selected for the England Test squad for the first time in 2012 following the withdrawal of Ravi Bopara for 'personal reasons'. Taylor made his Test debut in the second Test against South Africa on 2 August 2012 and made 34 runs, sharing in a 147-run partnership with Kevin Pietersen which helped secure a draw for England. However, his efforts in two Tests were not enough to earn him selection for the winter tours of India and New Zealand, instead touring with England Lions once again.

Taylor returned to the England team for another ODI against Ireland. This time he fared better, making a score of 25 as England won the match by six wickets.

==== 2014–15 Sri Lanka and Tri Series ====
Following his form for Nottinghamshire, Taylor returned to the England squad for the limited overs tour against Sri Lanka. Taylor got his chance to play in the third ODI after Alistair Cook was suspended for a slow over rate. Taylor took his chance and made 90 to help England win the game. Following his performance, Taylor kept his place and made 68 in the next match, although this time it was in vain as England lost. He played in the final two games of the series although he failed to make another significant score, hitting a combined total of 12 runs in the two innings.

Taylor kept his place batting at number three for the Tri series against India and Australia. In the first game of the series he made a duck in the defeat to Australia, but performed better in the next match against India, hitting an unbeaten 56 to help guide England to victory. He again struggled against Australia in the next match, making just five. In the must win game against India he hit 82 to help England win the match and reach the final. However, in the final Taylor could only make four as England lost to Australia.

==== 2015 Cricket World Cup ====
Taylor continued his impressive form at the 2015 Cricket World Cup opener against Australia, where he scored an unbeaten 98 in a losing cause. He was involved in the controversial dismissal of James Anderson in the same match, which arguably prevented him from going on to make a maiden ODI century. Anderson was incorrectly ruled run out by ICC umpire Kumar Dharmasena. Taylor was dismissed for a duck in the next match as England suffered a humiliating eight wicket defeat by New Zealand. He made 17 against Scotland as England won their first match of the tournament. He made 25 against Sri Lanka but England again suffered a heavy defeat, this time by nine wickets. This set up a must win game against Bangladesh. Taylor was dismissed for just one as England failed to chase down 275 and went out of the tournament at the group stage. In their final game against Afghanistan England won by nine wickets, with Taylor hitting an unbeaten eight to help see England over the line.

In February 2015, Taylor was awarded an England increment contract after representing the team in 10 ODIs in a period of 12 months. Increment contracts are granted to county players who feature regularly in England's limited-overs teams.

==== 2015 Australia ====
He played in all five ODIs against Australia, and was one of England's stand out performers. He made a score of 49 in the first match but England were unable to chase down Australia's total of 305, losing by 59 runs. Taylor made 43 in the next game, which England also lost. In the third ODI, he made 101 to guide England to a total of 300, and helped England win their first match of the series. In the next match he scored 41 again as England won the game by three wickets to level the series at 2-2. In the final game of the series, Taylor could only manage 12, as England posted a small target 138. He captained England in the field in the final game after Eoin Morgan was injured while batting. This marked the first time in the series Taylor had scored below 40. Australia won the game by eight wickets and won the series 3–2.

==== 2015 Pakistan ====
After being selected for the squad for the tour of the UAE following his good performances in the ODI series against Australia, he wasn't picked for the First and Second Test. However, he was picked for the Third Test after Jos Buttler was dropped following a run of bad form. He went on to score 74* from 141 balls after day two making an 83 run partnership with Jonny Bairstow who made 37* off 94 balls. Despite this, England lost by 127 runs.

Taylor played in all four ODIs against Pakistan following his impressive performances against Australia. He scored 60 in the first game as England posted 216, but Pakistan chased down the target to win the match. Taylor finished unbeaten on nine in the second ODI, with England winning by 95 runs. He scored his second half century of the series, an unbeaten 67 in the third ODI as England chased down Pakistan's target of 209 in convincing fashion. In the final game he made 13, as England won the game and the series 3–1.

==== 2016 South Africa ====
He played in all four Tests in England's historic victory over South Africa. In the first Test he scored 70 in the first innings as England posted 303. He was dismissed for 42 in the second innings to help England set South Africa a competitive target, and England went on to win the game by 241 runs. In the second Test Taylor was out for a duck in the first innings and made 27 in the second innings in a game which proved to be a high scoring draw. Taylor made 7 in the first innings of the third Test and was unbeaten at the end of the second innings as England won by seven wickets to secure a series victory. During his time in the field, Taylor had taken two wonderful catches at short leg. In the final match of the series, Taylor failed to get going, scoring 14 in the first innings as England failed to get close to South Africa's first innings score of 475. England collapsed in the second innings, being bowled out for 101, with Taylor being one of the better performers, scoring 24. Despite the defeat, England won the series 2–1, and Taylor had cemented the number five spot in the side.

=== Retirement from playing ===
On 12 April 2016, it was announced that Taylor had been forced to retire from cricket following the diagnosis of a serious heart condition called arrhythmogenic right ventricular cardiomyopathy (ARVC), that is similar to that of Fabrice Muamba. His heart rate had reached 265 at some points.

== Activities after playing retirement ==
After playing retirement Taylor became involved in coaching, gave talks, and appeared as an occasional summariser on the BBC Radio cricket commentary show Test Match Special.

He released his autobiography, James Taylor: Cut Short for White Owl Books in June 2018.

He was appointed as a full-time selector for the England cricket team in July 2018. Taylor's role changed to head scout in April 2021.

It was announced in October 2022 that he would become batting coach for the Leicestershire first team. Taylor became joint interim head coach alongside Alfonso Thomas in June 2023, before being made permanent assistant coach in November that year.

== Personal life ==
Taylor married his girlfriend Josie in August 2017. They had a daughter in 2022.

== Career best performances ==
James Taylor's Career Best Performances
	Batting				Bowling			
	Score	Fixture	Venue	Season	Score	Fixture	Venue	Season
FC	291	Nottinghamshire v Sussex	Horsham	2015	-	-	-	-
LA	146*	Nottinghamshire v Derbyshire	Nottingham	2014	4-61	Leicestershire v Warwickshire	Leicester	2010
T20	62*	Leicestershire v Yorkshire	Leeds	2010	1-10	Leicestershire v Yorkshire	Leeds	2009

== Recognition ==
- 2009
  - PCA Young Cricketer of the Year
  - CWC Young Cricketer of the Year
  - NBC Denis Compton Award
  - Young Wisden Schools Cricketer of the Year

Preceded by Jonny Bairstow	Young Wisden Schools Cricketer of the Year; 2009	Succeeded by Jos Buttler
