= 2021 The Hundred season =

Inaugural season of The Hundred

- Dates: 21 July – 21 August 2021
- Administrator: England and Wales Cricket Board
- Cricket format: 100-ball cricket
- Tournament format(s): Group stage and knockout
- Champions: M: Southern Brave (1st title); W: Oval Invincibles (1st title)
- Participants: W: 8 M: 8
- Matches: 68; W: 34; M: 34
- Player of the series: W: Dane van Niekerk (Oval Invincibles); M: Liam Livingstone (Birmingham Phoenix)
- Most runs: W: Dane van Niekerk (Oval Invincibles) (259); M: Liam Livingstone (Birmingham Phoenix) (348)
- Most wickets: W: Tash Farrant (Oval Invincibles) (18); M: Four players (12) (Note: Adam Milne, Marchant de Lange, Adil Rashid and Rashid Khan all took 12 wickets in the men's competition.)
- Official website: The Hundred

The 2021 The Hundred season was the inaugural season of The Hundred, a professional franchise 100-ball cricket tournament involving eight men's and women's teams located in major cities across United Kingdom. The tournament was run by the England and Wales Cricket Board (ECB) and took place for the first time, having been delayed a year due to the COVID-19 pandemic.

The tournament gave equal weight to both men's and women's sides, with almost all the matches taking place as back-to-back double-headers at the same venue on the same day, with one ticket giving access to both the men's and women's games.

The women's Oval Invincibles and the men's Southern Brave were the inaugural champions.

== Background ==
Eight teams competed for the men's and women's titles over a month between 21 July and 21 August 2021, ensuring that the competition took place during the school summer holidays. Aside from the opening two fixtures featuring the Oval Invincibles vs the Manchester Originals, all men's and women's matches were held on the same day at the same grounds.

There were 64 matches in the league stage (32 men's, 32 women's). Each team played four matches at home and four matches away. This included one match against every other side and then a second bonus match against their nearest regional rivals.

Once the league stage was completed the top three teams competed in the knockout stage to decide the ultimate champions. The second and third teams met in a semi-final, which was played at the Oval. The winner of the semi-final then met the team that finished top of the league in the final at Lord's.

Semifinal	Final
	First-placed team
Second-placed team	Winner of semi-final
Third-placed team

== Teams and venues ==
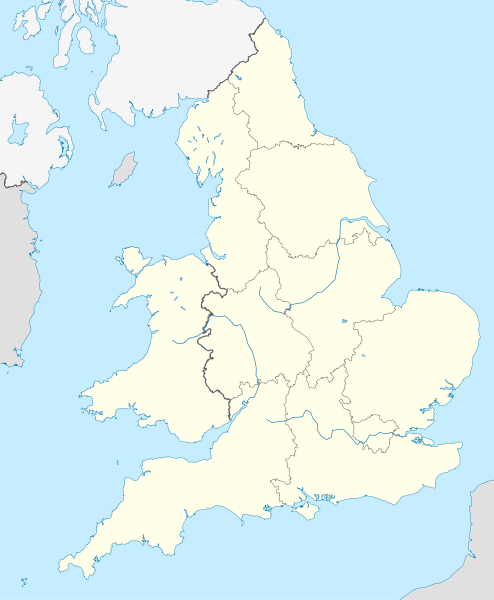
Venues in England and Wales

The eight teams competing were newly created franchises, operating separately from the existing county cricket clubs. Each represented a large area of England and Wales, with venues chosen for their locations in major cities.

Team personnel was initially announced in 2019. When the tournament finally took place in 2021, Andy Flower replaced Stephen Fleming as the coach of Trent Rockets men and Jonathan Batty replaced Lydia Greenway as the coach of Oval Invincibles women before the start of the season.

Team	Venue	Women's Coach	Men's Coach
Birmingham Phoenix	Edgbaston, Birmingham	Ben Sawyer	Andrew McDonald
London Spirit	Lord's, London	Lisa Keightley	Shane Warne
Manchester Originals	Old Trafford, Manchester	Paul Shaw	Simon Katich
Northern Superchargers	Headingley, Leeds	Danielle Hazell	Darren Lehmann
Oval Invincibles	The Oval, London	Jonathan Batty	Tom Moody
Southern Brave	Rose Bowl, Hampshire	Charlotte Edwards	Mahela Jayawardene
Trent Rockets	Trent Bridge, Nottingham	Salliann Briggs	Andy Flower
Welsh Fire (Welsh: Tân Cymreig)	Sophia Gardens, Cardiff	Matthew Mott	Gary Kirsten

== Draft and signings ==
=== 2019 ===
Each squad was initially made up of 15 players, of whom a maximum of three could be overseas players.

For the men's competition, each franchise could choose one centrally contracted England Test player, with first refusal granted to franchises whose affiliated counties had one or more centrally contracted players in their squads.

Trent Rockets, London Spirit and Welsh Fire, having no centrally contracted players at their affiliated counties, were then allowed to select from the remaining England players.

For the men's teams, each franchise could choose two "local icons", high-profile players who represented one of their affiliated counties.

For the women's teams, each franchise had two centrally contracted players.

On 3 October 2019 the first players to be allocated to teams were announced. They were as follows:

Team	England women's central contracted players	England men's central contract player	Men's local icons
Birmingham Phoenix	Amy Jones, Kirstie Gordon	Chris Woakes	Moeen Ali, Pat Brown
London Spirit	Heather Knight, Freya Davies	Rory Burns	Eoin Morgan, Dan Lawrence
Manchester Originals	Kate Cross, Sophie Ecclestone	Jos Buttler	Saqib Mahmood, Matt Parkinson
Northern Superchargers	Lauren Winfield, Linsey Smith	Ben Stokes	Adil Rashid, David Willey
Oval Invincibles	Laura Marsh, Fran Wilson	Sam Curran	Jason Roy, Tom Curran
Southern Brave	Anya Shrubsole, Danni Wyatt	Jofra Archer	James Vince, Chris Jordan
Trent Rockets	Nat Sciver, Katherine Brunt	Joe Root	Alex Hales, Harry Gurney
Welsh Fire (Tân Cymreig)	Katie George, Bryony Smith	Jonny Bairstow	Tom Banton, Colin Ingram

Players for the women's teams were selected between October and 2019 and May 2020, with three player pools established: the remaining England centrally contracted players, overseas players and domestic players.

Teams were allowed a maximum of three centrally contracted players and three overseas players.

Players for the men's teams were signed using a draft system common in other franchise leagues. The draft took place on 20 October 2019 at Sky Studios in Osterley. Sky Sports and BBC Sport showed the event live.

Round	Birmingham Phoenix	London Spirit	Manchester Originals	Northern Superchargers	Oval Invincibles	Southern Brave	Trent Rockets	Welsh Fire
Central	Chris Woakes	Rory Burns	Jos Buttler	Ben Stokes	Sam Curran	Jofra Archer	Joe Root	Jonny Bairstow
Rd 1	Liam Livingstone	Glenn Maxwell	Imran Tahir	Aaron Finch	Sunil Narine	Andre Russell	Rashid Khan	Mitchell Starc
Rd 1	Moeen Ali	Eoin Morgan	Dane Vilas	Mujeeb Ur Rahman	Jason Roy	David Warner	D'Arcy Short	Steve Smith
Rd 2	Kane Williamson	Mohammad Nabi	Phil Salt	Chris Lynn	Sam Billings	Liam Dawson	Lewis Gregory	Colin Ingram
Rd 2	Ravi Bopara	Mohammad Amir	Tom Abell	Adil Rashid	Sandeep Lamichhane	James Vince	Alex Hales	Tom Banton
Rd 3	Benny Howell	Roelof van der Merwe	Matt Parkinson	Adam Lyth	Rilee Rossouw	Shadab Khan	Nathan Coulter-Nile	Ben Duckett
Rd 3	Tom Helm	Mark Wood	Saqib Mahmood	David Willey	Tom Curran	Chris Jordan	Harry Gurney	Ravi Rampaul
Rd 4	Shaheen Afridi	Joe Denly	Daniel Christian	Richard Gleeson	Reece Topley	Tymal Mills	Steven Mullaney	Simon Harmer
Rd 4	Pat Brown	Dan Lawrence	Wayne Madsen	Ben Foakes	Hardus Viljoen	Ross Whiteley	Matthew Carter	Qais Ahmed
Rd 5	Adam Hose	Mason Crane	Wayne Parnell	Tom Kohler-Cadmore	Fabian Allen	Delray Rawlins	Luke Wood	Liam Plunkett
Rd 5	Cameron Delport	Kyle Abbott	Mitchell Santner	David Wiese	Alex Blake	Ollie Pope	Tom Moores	Ryan ten Doeschate
Rd 6	Henry Brookes	Adam Rossington	Joe Clarke	Nathan Rimmington	Will Jacks	George Garton	Dawid Malan	David Payne
Rd 6	Adam Zampa	Zak Crawley	Marchant de Lange	Brydon Carse	Chris Wood	Alex Davies	Ben Cox	Ryan Higgins
Rd 7	Riki Wessels	Jade Dernbach	Ed Pollock	Ed Barnard	Nathan Sowter	Max Waller	Luke Fletcher	Danny Briggs
Rd 7	Chris Cooke	Luis Reece	Eddie Byrom	John Simpson	Laurie Evans	Craig Overton	Luke Wright	Leus du Plooy

Changed teams in 2021
Released in 2021

=== 2021 ===
The delay caused by the COVID-19 pandemic had an impact on the squads.

Women's teams were less affected because they had had no draft: squads had been built in waves of signings, and were not complete when the pandemic hit. There was little movement among domestic players, as they were allowed to roll over their contracts, but by July 2021, fourteen overseas players had withdrawn.

With regards to the men's teams, changes to England's central contracts in 2020 forced squad changes. Jonny Bairstow lost his contract, so Ollie Pope became Welsh Fire's centrally contracted player, although Bairstow stayed with the side. Elsewhere, Essex's Zak Crawley became London Spirit's centrally contracted player, meaning Rory Burns moved to the Oval Invincibles, the franchise affiliated with his county Surrey. Both the Invincibles and Birmingham Phoenix were given permission to have two centrally contracted players.

In February 2021, teams were given the option to retain or release the players they had drafted in 2019, and took very different approaches. Trent Rockets, Southern Brave and London Spirit kept almost the entirety of the 15-man squads they had drafted in 2019, while Welsh Fire released half of their players and Manchester Originals kept only five.

A total of thirty-five players were released. In some cases this was due to the availability of foreign stars or the changing fortunes of local players, but Brexit was also a factor in this reshuffling. Players who had qualified as "local players" under Kolpak registrations were suddenly "overseas players", meaning eleven of them were released.

The pandemic also meant the men's salaries were reduced by 20%.

Round	Birmingham Phoenix	London Spirit	Manchester Originals	Northern Superchargers	Oval Invincibles	Southern Brave	Trent Rockets	Welsh Fire
Central	Chris Woakes	Zak Crawley	Jos Buttler	Ben Stokes	Sam Curran	Jofra Archer	Joe Root	Ollie Pope
Central	Dom Sibley				Rory Burns			
Rd 1	Liam Livingstone	Glenn Maxwell	Nicholas Pooran	Aaron Finch	Sunil Narine	David Warner	Rashid Khan	Kieron Pollard
Rd 1	Moeen Ali	Eoin Morgan	Kagiso Rabada	Mujeeb Ur Rahman	Jason Roy	Andre Russell	D'Arcy Short	Jonny Bairstow
Rd 2	Tom Abell	Mohammad Nabi	Harry Gurney	Chris Lynn	Sam Billings	Marcus Stoinis	Lewis Gregory	Jhye Richardson
Rd 2	Kane Williamson	Mohammad Amir	Phil Salt	Adil Rashid	Tom Curran	James Vince	Alex Hales	Tom Banton
Rd 3	Benny Howell	Ravi Bopara	Matt Parkinson	Adam Lyth	Saqib Mahmood	Liam Dawson	Nathan Coulter-Nile	Jake Ball
Rd 3	Tom Helm	Mark Wood	Joe Clarke	David Willey	Sandeep Lamichhane	Chris Jordan	Dawid Malan	Ben Duckett
Rd 4	Shaheen Afridi	Joe Denly	Jamie Overton	Olly Stone	Colin Ingram	Danny Briggs	Timm van der Gugten	Ian Cockbain
Rd 4	Pat Brown	Dan Lawrence	Shadab Khan	Matthew Potts	Reece Topley	Tymal Mills	Steven Mullaney	Qais Ahmed
Rd 5	Adam Hose	Chris Wood	Tom Lammonby	Matthew Fisher	Will Jacks	Delray Rawlins	Matthew Carter	Josh Cobb
Rd 5	Adam Zampa	Mason Crane	Wayne Madsen	Tom Kohler-Cadmore	Laurie Evans	Alex Davies	Tom Moores	Liam Plunkett
Rd 6	Daniel Bell-Drummond	Adam Rossington	Steven Finn	Harry Brook	Brandon Glover	George Garton	Luke Wood	David Payne
Rd 6	Henry Brookes	Roelof van der Merwe	Colin Ackermann	Brydon Carse	Jordan Clark	Ross Whiteley	Luke Wright	Ryan Higgins
Rd 7	Miles Hammond	Jade Dernbach	Richard Gleeson	Callum Parkinson	Nathan Sowter	Max Waller	Samit Patel	Matthew Critchley
Rd 7	Chris Cooke	Luis Reece	Tom Hartley	John Simpson	Alex Blake		Ben Cox	David Lloyd

Changed teams in 2021
Drafted in 2021

Squads were completed in July 2021, with each team being allowed a wildcard pick: a player who had performed well in the T20 Blast. They were as follows:

- Birmingham Phoenix - Dillon Pennington (Worcestershire)
- London Spirit - Blake Cullen (Middlesex)
- Manchester Originals - Fred Klaassen (Kent)
- Northern Superchargers - Ben Raine (Durham)
- Oval Invincibles - Jordan Cox (Kent)
- Southern Brave - Jake Lintott (Warwickshire)
- Trent Rockets - Sam Cook (Essex)
- Welsh Fire - Leus du Plooy (Derbyshire)

== Broadcasting ==
All games were televised by Sky Sports, with the BBC also showing 10 men's and 8 women's games free-to-air. Sky also showed all of the women's games and some of the men's games in full on its YouTube channel.

== Standings ==
=== Women ===
Pos	Team	Pld	W	L	T	NR	Pts	NRR
1	Southern Brave	8	7	1	0	0	14	1.056
2	Oval Invincibles (C)	8	4	3	0	1	9	0.015
3	Birmingham Phoenix	8	4	4	0	0	8	0.186
4	London Spirit	8	4	4	0	0	8	0.046
5	Manchester Originals	8	3	4	0	1	7	0.016
6	Northern Superchargers	8	3	4	0	1	7	−0.041
7	Trent Rockets	8	3	4	0	1	7	−0.293
8	Welsh Fire	8	2	6	0	0	4	−1.017

Source: ESPN Cricinfo, Sky Sports
(C) Champions

advances to the Final
advances to the Eliminator

=== Men ===
Pos	Team	Pld	W	L	T	NR	Pts	NRR
1	Birmingham Phoenix	8	6	2	0	0	12	1.087
2	Southern Brave (C)	8	5	2	0	1	11	0.034
3	Trent Rockets	8	5	3	0	0	10	0.035
4	Oval Invincibles	8	4	3	0	1	9	0.123
5	Northern Superchargers	8	3	4	0	1	7	0.510
6	Manchester Originals	8	2	4	0	2	6	−0.361
7	Welsh Fire	8	3	5	0	0	6	−0.827
8	London Spirit	8	1	6	0	1	3	−0.641

Source: ESPN Cricinfo, Sky Sports
(C) Champions

advances to the Final
advances to the Eliminator

== Results ==
=== Women ===
==== July ====
21 July 2021
18:30 (N)
Scorecard

Manchester Originals; 135/6 (100 balls)	v	Oval Invincibles (H); 139/5 (98 balls)
Lizelle Lee 42 (39); Tash Farrant 3/25 (20 balls)		Dane van Niekerk 56* (42); Kate Cross 3/28 (18 balls)

Oval Invincibles won by 5 wickets
The Oval, London
Umpires: Sue Redfern and Tim Robinson
Player of the match: Dane van Niekerk (Oval Invincibles)

- Manchester Originals won the toss and elected to bat.
- Points: Oval Invincibles 2, Manchester Originals 0.

23 July 2021
15:00
Scorecard

(H) Birmingham Phoenix; 128/6 (100 balls)	v	London Spirit; 132/7 (96 balls)
Evelyn Jones 47 (41); Deandra Dottin 2/28 (20 balls)		Naomi Dattani 34 (19); Erin Burns 2/15 (20 balls)

London Spirit won by 3 wickets
Edgbaston, Birmingham
Umpires: Rob Bailey and Jasmine Naeem
Player of the match: Evelyn Jones (Birmingham Phoenix)

- London Spirit won the toss and elected to field.
- Points: London Spirit 2, Birmingham Phoenix 0.

24 July 2021
11:00
Scorecard

Southern Brave; 133/5 (100 balls)	v	Trent Rockets (H); 110/7 (100 balls)
Stafanie Taylor 45* (31); Nat Sciver 2/33 (20 balls)		Nat Sciver 44 (29); Anya Shrubsole 4/13 (20 balls)

Southern Brave won by 23 runs
Trent Bridge, Nottingham
Umpires: Nick Cook and Sue Redfern
Player of the match: Stafanie Taylor (Southern Brave)

- Trent Rockets won the toss and elected to field.
- Points: Southern Brave 2, Trent Rockets 0.

24 July 2021
14:30
Scorecard

Welsh Fire; 130/8 (100 balls)	v	Northern Superchargers (H); 131/4 (85 balls)
Hayley Matthews 30 (20); Linsey Smith 3/14 (20 balls)		Jemimah Rodrigues 92* (43); Piepa Cleary 1/14 (15 balls)

Northern Superchargers won by 6 wickets
Headingley, Leeds
Umpires: Anna Harris and Steve O'Shaughnessy
Player of the match: Jemimah Rodrigues (Northern Superchargers)

- Northern Superchargers won the toss and elected to field.
- Points: Northern Superchargers 2, Welsh Fire 0.

25 July 2021
11:00
Scorecard

Oval Invincibles; 132/7 (100 balls)	v	London Spirit (H); 117/7 (100 balls)
Alice Capsey 59 (41); Naomi Dattani 2/23 (15 balls)		Heather Knight 40 (29); Dane van Niekerk 3/30 (20 balls)

Oval Invincibles won by 15 runs
Lord's, London
Umpires: Anna Harris and Graham Lloyd
Player of the match: Alice Capsey (Oval Invincibles)

- London Spirit won the toss and elected to field.
- Points: Oval Invincibles 2, London Spirit 0.

25 July 2021
14:30
Scorecard

Birmingham Phoenix; 113/9 (100 balls)	v	Manchester Originals (H); 93/8 (100 balls)
Amy Jones 31 (17); Emma Lamb 3/16 (20 balls)		Harmanpreet Kaur 49* (47); Kirstie Gordon 3/14 (20 balls)

Birmingham Phoenix won by 20 runs
Old Trafford, Manchester
Umpires: Neil Mallender and Jasmine Naeem
Player of the match: Kirstie Gordon (Birmingham Phoenix)

- Birmingham Phoenix won the toss and elected to bat.
- Points: Birmingham Phoenix 2, Manchester Originals 0.

26 July 2021
15:00
Scorecard

Northern Superchargers; 149/7 (100 balls)	v	Trent Rockets (H); 122/7 (100 balls)
Jemimah Rodrigues 60 (41); Sammy-Jo Johnson 4/15 (20 balls)		Katherine Brunt 43* (36); Katie Levick 2/20 (20 balls)

Northern Superchargers won by 27 runs
Trent Bridge, Nottingham
Umpires: David Millns and Sue Redfern
Player of the match: Jemimah Rodrigues (Northern Superchargers)

- Northern Superchargers won the toss and elected to bat.
- Points: Northern Superchargers 2, Trent Rockets 0.

27 July 2021
15:00
Scorecard

(H) Welsh Fire; 110/7 (100 balls)	v	Southern Brave; 112/2 (84 balls)
Hayley Matthews 33 (20); Lauren Bell 2/19 (20 balls); Amanda-Jade Wellington 2/19 (20 balls)		Smriti Mandhana 61* (39); Nicole Harvey 1/23 (15 balls)

Southern Brave won by 8 wickets
Sophia Gardens, Cardiff
Umpires: Jasmine Naeem and Alex Wharf
Player of the match: Smriti Mandhana (Southern Brave)

- Southern Brave won the toss and elected to field.
- Points: Southern Brave 2, Welsh Fire 0.

28 July 2021
15:00
Scorecard

(H) Manchester Originals	v	Northern Superchargers

Match abandoned
Old Trafford, Manchester
Umpires: Anna Harris and David Millns

- No toss.
- No play was possible due to rain.
- Points: Manchester Originals 1, Northern Superchargers 1.

29 July 2021
15:00
Scorecard

Trent Rockets; 151/4 (100 balls)	v	London Spirit (H); 133/7 (100 balls)
Rachel Priest 76 (42); Freya Davies 1/19 (20 balls)		Heather Knight 31 (25); Lucy Higham 2/12 (15 balls)

Trent Rockets won by 18 runs
Lord's, London
Umpires: Neil Mallender and Sue Redfern
Player of the match: Rachel Priest (Trent Rockets)

- Trent Rockets won the toss and elected to bat.
- Points: Trent Rockets 2, London Spirit 0.

30 July 2021
15:00
Scorecard

Birmingham Phoenix; 140/4 (100 balls)	v	Southern Brave (H); 141/2 (82 balls)
Amy Jones 42* (26); Amanda-Jade Wellington 2/16 (20 balls)		Danni Wyatt 69* (40); Erin Burns 1/28 (15 balls)

Southern Brave won by 8 wickets
Rose Bowl, Southampton
Umpires: Jasmine Naeem and Russell Warren
Player of the match: Danni Wyatt (Southern Brave)

- Southern Brave won the toss and elected to field.
- Points: Southern Brave 2, Birmingham Phoenix 0.

31 July 2021
11:00
Scorecard

Manchester Originals; 120/6 (100 balls)	v	Welsh Fire (H); 124/1 (88 balls)
Sophie Ecclestone 31* (15); Georgia Hennessy 2/24 (20 balls)		Hayley Matthews 71* (50); Laura Jackson 1/27 (15 balls)

Welsh Fire won by 9 wickets
Sophia Gardens, Cardiff
Umpires: Neil Mallender and Sue Redfern
Player of the match: Hayley Matthews (Welsh Fire)

- Welsh Fire won the toss and elected to field.
- Points: Welsh Fire 2, Manchester Originals 0.

31 July 2021
14:30
Scorecard

(H) Northern Superchargers; 109/8 (100 balls)	v	Oval Invincibles; 105/4 (100 balls)
Alice Davidson-Richards 42 (30); Alice Capsey 2/9 (20 balls)		Sarah Bryce 29 (33); Alice Davidson-Richards 2/17 (20 balls)

Northern Superchargers won by 4 runs
Headingley, Leeds
Umpires: Anna Harris and Steve O'Shaughnessy
Player of the match: Alice Davidson-Richards (Northern Superchargers)

- Oval Invincibles won the toss and elected to field.
- Points: Northern Superchargers 2, Oval Invincibles 0.

===== August =====
1 August 2021
11:00
Scorecard

Trent Rockets; 145/5 (100 balls)	v	Birmingham Phoenix (H); 134/9 (100 balls)
Heather Graham 44 (21); Kirstie Gordon 1/20 (20 balls)		Issy Wong 27 (11); Sammy-Jo Johnson 3/28 (20 balls)

Trent Rockets won by 11 runs
Edgbaston, Birmingham
Umpires: Rob Bailey and Jasmine Naeem
Player of the match: Heather Graham (Trent Rockets)

- Trent Rockets won the toss and elected to bat.
- Points: Trent Rockets 2, Birmingham Phoenix 0.

1 August 2021
14:30
Scorecard

(H) London Spirit; 93 (96 balls)	v	Southern Brave; 97/3 (92 balls)
Tammy Beaumont 34 (45); Amanda-Jade Wellington 4/14 (20 balls)		Stafanie Taylor 29* (32); Deepti Sharma 2/10 (20 balls)

Southern Brave won by 7 wickets
Lord's, London
Umpires: Sarah Bartlett and Peter Hartley
Player of the match: Amanda-Jade Wellington (Southern Brave)

- Southern Brave won the toss and elected to field.
- Points: Southern Brave 2, London Spirit 0.

2 August 2021
15:00
Scorecard

Welsh Fire; 112/6 (100 balls)	v	Oval Invincibles (H); 100/9 (100 balls)
Georgia Redmayne 30 (29); Dane van Niekerk 1/10 (20 balls)		Grace Gibbs 21 (22); Hayley Matthews 3/23 (20 balls)

Welsh Fire won by 12 runs
The Oval, London
Umpires: Graham Lloyd and Sue Redfern
Player of the match: Sarah Taylor (Welsh Fire)

- Oval Invincibles won the toss and elected to field.
- Points: Welsh Fire 2, Oval Invincibles 0.

3 August 2021
15:00
Scorecard

Northern Superchargers; 126/5 (100 balls)	v	London Spirit (H); 129/3 (98 balls)
Jemimah Rodrigues 57 (44); Sophie Munro 2/20 (15 balls)		Deandra Dottin 50* (34); Linsey Smith 2/15 (20 balls)

London Spirit won by 7 wickets
Lord's, London
Umpires: Rob Bailey and Anna Harris
Player of the match: Deandra Dottin (London Spirit)

- Northern Superchargers won the toss and elected to bat.
- Points: London Spirit 2, Northern Superchargers 0.

4 August 2021
15:30
Scorecard

(H) Birmingham Phoenix; 129/9 (100 balls)	v	Oval Invincibles; 133/2 (97 balls)
Erin Burns 45 (28); Tash Farrant 3/23 (20 balls)		Dane van Niekerk 67* (51); Kirstie Gordon 2/20 (20 balls)

Oval Invincibles won by 8 wickets
Edgbaston, Birmingham
Umpires: Jasmine Naeem and Martin Saggers
Player of the match: Tash Farrant (Oval Invincibles)

- Birmingham Phoenix won the toss and elected to bat.
- Points: Oval Invincibles 2, Birmingham Phoenix 0.

5 August 2021
15:30
Scorecard

Southern Brave; 123/7 (100 balls)	v	Manchester Originals (H); 97/1 (70 balls)
Sophia Dunkley 28 (25); Hannah Jones 3/17 (20 overs)		Lizelle Lee 43* (32)

Manchester Originals won by 17 runs (DLS Method)
Old Trafford, Manchester
Umpires: Anna Harris and Alex Wharf
Player of the match: Lizelle Lee (Manchester Originals)

- Manchester Originals won the toss and elected to field.
- No further play was possible due to rain. Manchester Originals were 17 runs ahead of the DLS par score of 80 runs from 70 balls.
- Points: Manchester Originals 2, Southern Brave 0.

6 August 2021
15:30
Scorecard

(H) Welsh Fire; 102 (100 balls)	v	Trent Rockets; 103/6 (92 balls)
Hayley Matthews 28 (32); Heather Graham 3/14 (20 balls)		Nat Sciver 54 (40); Hayley Matthews 2/13 (20 balls)

Trent Rockets won by 4 wickets
Sophia Gardens, Cardiff
Umpires: Peter Hartley and Jasmine Naeem
Player of the match: Nat Sciver (Trent Rockets)

- Trent Rockets won the toss and elected to field.
- Points: Trent Rockets 2, Welsh Fire 0.

7 August 2021
15:30
Scorecard

Northern Superchargers; 76/3 (73 balls)	v	Southern Brave (H); 89/3 (62 balls)
Laura Wolvaardt 21* (22); Lauren Bell 2/19 (15 balls)		Sophia Dunkley 50* (28); Kalea Moore 2/9 (15 balls)

Southern Brave won by 7 wickets (DLS Method)
Rose Bowl, Southampton
Umpires: Nick Cook and Anna Harris
Player of the match: Sophia Dunkley (Southern Brave)

- Southern Brave won the toss and elected to field.
- Rain stopped play during Northern Superchargers innings. Southern Brave were set a revised target of 89 runs from 75 balls.
- Points: Southern Brave 2, Northern Superchargers 0.

8 August 2021
15:30
Scorecard

Trent Rockets	v	Oval Invincibles (H)

No result
The Oval, London
Umpires: Rob Bailey and Sarah Bartlett

- Trent Rockets won the toss and elected to bat.
- No play was possible due to rain.
- Points: Oval Invincibles 1, Trent Rockets 1.

9 August 2021
15:00
Scorecard

Welsh Fire; 127/9 (100 balls)	v	Birmingham Phoenix (H); 131/0 (76 balls)
Bryony Smith 38 (36); Kirstie Gordon 2/30 (20 balls)		Shafali Verma 76* (42)

Birmingham Phoenix won by 10 wickets
Edgbaston, Birmingham
Umpires: Sarah Bartlett and Russell Warren
Player of the match: Shafali Verma (Birmingham Phoenix)

- Birmingham Phoenix won the toss and elected to field.
- Points: Birmingham Phoenix 2, Welsh Fire 0.

10 August 2021
15:00
Scorecard

(H) Manchester Originals; 127/5 (100 balls)	v	London Spirit; 131/5 (98 balls)
Emma Lamb 39 (30); Deepti Sharma 2/10 (20 balls)		Heather Knight 35 (26); Alex Hartley 3/32 (20 balls)

London Spirit won by 5 wickets
Old Trafford, Manchester
Umpires: Peter Hartley and Sue Redfern
Player of the match: Deepti Sharma (London Spirit)

- Manchester Originals won the toss and elected to bat.
- Points: London Spirit 2, Manchester Originals 0.

11 August 2021
15:00
Scorecard

(H) Southern Brave; 166/3 (100 balls)	v	Welsh Fire; 127/4 (100 balls)
Smriti Mandhana 78 (52); Hayley Matthews 2/27 (20 balls)		Georgia Redmayne 35* (27); Danni Wyatt 1/10 (5 balls)

Southern Brave won by 39 runs
Rose Bowl, Southampton
Umpires: Graham Lloyd and Jasmine Naeem
Player of the match: Smriti Mandhana (Southern Brave)

- Welsh Fire won the toss and elected to field.
- Points: Southern Brave 2, Welsh Fire 0.

12 August 2021
15:30
Scorecard

(H) Northern Superchargers; 126/5 (100 balls)	v	Manchester Originals; 127/2 (86 balls)
Laura Wolvaardt 75* (51); Kate Cross 3/19 (20 balls)		Lizelle Lee 68 (40); Kalea Moore 1/20 (15 balls)

Manchester Originals won by 8 wickets
Headingley, Leeds
Umpires: Nigel Llong and Sue Redfern
Player of the match: Kate Cross (Manchester Originals)

- Manchester Originals won the toss and elected to field.
- Points: Manchester Originals 2, Northern Superchargers 0.

13 August 2021
15:30
Scorecard

(H) Trent Rockets; 125/7 (100 balls)	v	Birmingham Phoenix; 129/7 (94 balls)
Abigail Freeborn 30 (23); Kirstie Gordon 3/26 (20 balls)		Erin Burns 38 (26); Sammy-Jo Johnson 3/22 (19 balls)

Birmingham Phoenix won by 3 wickets
Trent Bridge, Nottingham
Umpires: Rob Bailey and Jasmine Naeem
Player of the match: Erin Burns (Birmingham Phoenix)

- Birmingham Phoenix won the toss and elected to field.
- Points: Birmingham Phoenix 2, Trent Rockets 0.

14 August 2021
15:30
Scorecard

London Spirit; 103/9 (100 balls)	v	Oval Invincibles (H); 107/2 (87 balls)
Tammy Beaumont 42 (34); Marizanne Kapp 2/12 (20 balls)		Georgia Adams 37* (34); Charlie Dean 1/24 (17 balls)

Oval Invincibles won by 8 wickets
The Oval, London
Umpires: Anna Harris and Tim Robinson
Player of the match: Georgia Adams (Oval Invincibles)

- Oval Invincibles won the toss and elected to field.
- Points: Oval Invincibles 2, London Spirit 0.

15 August 2021
15:30
Scorecard

(H) Trent Rockets; 122/6 (100 balls)	v	Manchester Originals; 124/1 (87 balls)
Sammy-Jo Johnson 33 (20); Sophie Ecclestone 2/11 (20 balls)		Lizelle Lee 47* (45); Georgia Davis 1/9 (10 balls)

Manchester Originals won by 9 wickets
Trent Bridge, Nottingham
Umpires: Graham Lloyd and Sue Redfern
Player of the match: Lizelle Lee (Manchester Originals)

- Manchester Originals won the toss and elected to field.
- Points: Manchester Originals 2, Trent Rockets 0.

16 August 2021
15:30
Scorecard

(H) Southern Brave; 115/3 (100 balls)	v	Oval Invincibles; 85 (94 balls)
Sophia Dunkley 58* (39); Tash Farrant 2/22 (20 balls)		Dane van Niekerk 31 (32); Amanda-Jade Wellington 4/12 (20 balls)

Southern Brave won by 30 runs
Rose Bowl, Southampton
Umpires: Nick Cook and Jasmine Naeem
Player of the match: Sophia Dunkley (Southern Brave)

- Oval Invincibles won the toss and elected to field.
- Points: Southern Brave 2, Oval Invincibles 0.

17 August 2021
15:00
Scorecard

Birmingham Phoenix; 147/4 (100 balls)	v	Northern Superchargers (H); 133/6 (100 balls)
Evelyn Jones 64 (47); Katie Levick 2/23 (20 balls)		Lauren Winfield-Hill 64 (38); Issy Wong 2/23 (20 balls)

Birmingham Phoenix won by 14 runs
Headingley, Leeds
Umpires: Anna Harris and Steve O'Shaughnessy
Player of the match: Evelyn Jones (Birmingham Phoenix)

- Northern Superchargers won the toss and elected to field.
- Points: Birmingham Phoenix 2, Northern Superchargers 0.

18 August 2021
15:00
Scorecard

(H) Welsh Fire; 95/9 (100 balls)	v	London Spirit; 96/3 (58 balls)
Georgia Redmayne 35 (28); Danielle Gibson 2/10 (15 balls)		Heather Knight 34* (19); Danielle Gibson 34* (19); Hayley Matthews 2/28 (18 balls)

London Spirit won by 7 wickets
Sophia Gardens, Cardiff
Umpires: Sarah Bartlett and David Millns
Player of the match: Danielle Gibson (London Spirit)

- London Spirit won the toss and elected to field.
- Points: London Spirit 2, Welsh Fire 0.

=== Men ===
==== July ====
22 July 2021
18:30 (N)
Scorecard

(H) Oval Invincibles; 145/8 (100 balls)	v	Manchester Originals; 136/7 (100 balls)
Sam Billings 49 (30); Fred Klaassen 3/23 (15 balls)		Carlos Brathwaite 37 (29); Nathan Sowter 2/18 (15 balls)

Oval Invincibles won by 9 runs
The Oval, London
Attendance: 18,126
Umpires: David Millns and Martin Saggers
Player of the match: Sam Billings (Oval Invincibles)

- Manchester Originals won the toss and elected to field.
- Points: Oval Invincibles 2, Manchester Originals 0.

23 July 2021
18:30 (N)
Scorecard

London Spirit; 144/6 (100 balls)	v	Birmingham Phoenix (H); 148/7 (97 balls)
Zak Crawley 64 (40); Adam Milne 2/18 (20 balls)		Moeen Ali 40 (30); Mohammad Amir 2/34 (17 balls)

Birmingham Phoenix won by 3 wickets
Edgbaston, Birmingham
Attendance: 12,137
Umpires: Graham Lloyd and Tim Robinson
Player of the match: Zak Crawley (London Spirit)

- Birmingham Phoenix won the toss and elected to field.
- Points: Birmingham Phoenix 2, London Spirit 0.

24 July 2021
14:30
Scorecard

Southern Brave; 126/8 (100 balls)	v	Trent Rockets (H); 127/1 (82 balls)
Ross Whiteley 39* (29); Marchant de Lange 5/20 (20 balls)		Dawid Malan 62* (43); George Garton 1/29 (15 balls)

Trent Rockets won by 9 wickets
Trent Bridge, Nottingham
Attendance: 12,783
Umpires: David Millns and Russell Warren
Player of the match: Marchant de Lange (Trent Rockets)

- Southern Brave won the toss and elected to bat.
- Points: Trent Rockets 2, Southern Brave 0.

24 July 2021
18:00 (N)
Scorecard

Welsh Fire; 173/4 (100 balls)	v	Northern Superchargers (H); 168/7 (100 balls)
Jonny Bairstow 56 (36); Ben Stokes 1/8 (10 balls)		Harry Brook 62 (31); Qais Ahmad 4/13 (20 balls)

Welsh Fire won by 5 runs
Headingley, Leeds
Attendance: 10,324
Umpires: Nigel Llong and Neil Mallender
Player of the match: Qais Ahmad (Welsh Fire)

- Northern Superchargers won the toss and elected to field.
- Points: Welsh Fire 2, Northern Superchargers 0.

25 July 2021
14:30
Scorecard

Oval Invincibles	v	London Spirit (H)

No result
Lord's, London
Umpires: Rob Bailey and Peter Hartley

- London Spirit won the toss and elected to field.
- No play was possible due to rain.
- Points: London Spirit 1, Oval Invincibles 1.

25 July 2021
18:00 (N)
Scorecard

Birmingham Phoenix; 87 (84 balls)	v	Manchester Originals (H); 89/4 (73 balls)
Moeen Ali 15 (18); Matt Parkinson 4/9 (19 balls)		Jos Buttler 30 (31); Moeen Ali 1/15 (20 balls)

Manchester Originals won by 6 wickets
Old Trafford, Manchester
Attendance: 7,855
Umpires: Steve O'Shaughnessy and Alex Wharf
Player of the match: Matt Parkinson (Manchester Originals)

- Birmingham Phoenix won the toss and elected to bat.
- Points: Manchester Originals 2, Birmingham Phoenix 0.

26 July 2021
18:30 (N)
Scorecard

Northern Superchargers; 132 (99 balls)	v	Trent Rockets (H); 134/8 (94 balls)
John Simpson 42 (33); Marchant de Lange 3/22 (14 balls)		Alex Hales 40* (34); Callum Parkinson 2/19 (15 balls)

Trent Rockets won by 2 wickets
Trent Bridge, Nottingham
Attendance: 11,483
Umpires: Tim Robinson and Russell Warren
Player of the match: Rashid Khan (Trent Rockets)

- Northern Superchargers won the toss and elected to bat.
- Points: Trent Rockets 2, Northern Superchargers 0.

27 July 2021
18:30 (N)
Scorecard

(H) Welsh Fire; 165/4 (100 balls)	v	Southern Brave; 147/7 (100 balls)
Jonny Bairstow 72 (39); Danny Briggs 2/33 (15 balls)		James Vince 40 (27); James Neesham 3/5 (15 balls)

Welsh Fire won by 18 runs
Sophia Gardens, Cardiff
Attendance: 3,021
Umpires: Rob Bailey and Nigel Llong
Player of the match: Jonny Bairstow (Welsh Fire)

- Southern Brave won the toss and elected to field.
- Points: Welsh Fire 2, Southern Brave 0.

28 July 2021
18:30 (N)
Scorecard

(H) Manchester Originals	v	Northern Superchargers

Match abandoned
Old Trafford, Manchester
Umpires: Peter Hartley and Graham Lloyd

- No toss.
- No play was possible due to rain.
- Points: Manchester Originals 1, Northern Superchargers 1.

29 July 2021
18:30 (N)
Scorecard

Trent Rockets; 123/4 (100 balls)	v	London Spirit (H); 116/8 (100 balls)
D'Arcy Short 69* (47); Mohammad Nabi 2/20 (20 balls)		Roelof van der Merwe 25* (18); Matt Carter 3/17 (20 balls)

Trent Rockets won by 7 runs
Lord's, London
Attendance: 23,892
Umpires: Nigel Llong and Alex Wharf
Player of the match: D'Arcy Short (Trent Rockets)

- London Spirit won the toss and elected to field.
- Points: Trent Rockets 2, London Spirit 0.

30 July 2021
18:30 (N)
Scorecard

Birmingham Phoenix; 151/3 (100 balls)	v	Southern Brave (H); 152/6 (97 balls)
Liam Livingstone 68* (44); Jake Lintott 2/13 (15 balls)		James Vince 60 (38); Adam Milne 3/15 (20 balls)

Southern Brave won by 4 wickets
Rose Bowl, Southampton
Umpires: David Millns and Martin Saggers
Player of the match: James Vince (Southern Brave)

- Southern Brave won the toss and elected to field.
- Points: Southern Brave 2, Birmingham Phoenix 0.

31 July 2021
14:30
Scorecard

(H) Welsh Fire; 150/6 (100 balls)	v	Manchester Originals; 153/3 (95 balls)
Leus du Plooy 43 (22); Tom Hartley 2/11 (15 balls)		Joe Clarke 58 (31); Ryan Higgins 1/9 (10 balls)

Manchester Originals won by 7 wickets
Sophia Gardens, Cardiff
Umpires: Rob Bailey and Tim Robinson
Player of the match: Joe Clarke (Manchester Originals)

- Welsh Fire won the toss and elected to bat.
- Points: Manchester Originals 2, Welsh Fire 0.

31 July 2021
18:00 (N)
Scorecard

Oval Invincibles; 127/6 (100 balls)	v	Northern Superchargers (H); 128/4 (97 balls)
Jason Roy 52* (43); Adil Rashid 3/13 (20 balls)		Chris Lynn 48 (48); Saqib Mahmood 2/19 (20 balls)

Northern Superchargers won by 6 wickets
Headingley, Leeds
Attendance: 10,859
Umpires: Nick Cook and Alex Wharf
Player of the match: Harry Brook (Northern Superchargers)

- Oval Invincibles won the toss and elected to bat.
- Points: Northern Superchargers 2, Oval Invincibles 0.

==== August ====
1 August 2021
14:30
Scorecard

Trent Rockets; 144/6 (100 balls)	v	Birmingham Phoenix (H); 145/4 (74 balls)
Dawid Malan 51 (41); Adam Milne 2/13 (20 balls)		Finn Allen 43 (23); Rashid Khan 3/26 (20 balls)

Birmingham Phoenix won by 6 wickets
Edgbaston, Birmingham
Attendance: 17,479
Umpires: Nigel Llong and Steve O'Shaughnessy
Player of the match: Will Smeed (Birmingham Phoenix)

- Birmingham Phoenix won the toss and elected to field.
- Points: Birmingham Phoenix 2, Trent Rockets 0.

1 August 2021
18:00 (N)
Scorecard

Southern Brave; 145/6 (100 balls)	v	London Spirit (H); 141/7 (100 balls)
Alex Davies 50 (40); Blake Cullen 2/27 (20 balls)		Josh Inglis 55 (43); George Garton 2/30 (20 balls)

Southern Brave won by 4 runs
Lord's, London
Umpires: Graham Lloyd and Russell Warren
Player of the match: Chris Jordan (Southern Brave)

- London Spirit won the toss and elected to field.
- Points: Southern Brave 2, London Spirit 0.

2 August 2021
18:30 (N)
Scorecard

Welsh Fire; 121/7 (100 balls)	v	Oval Invincibles (H); 125/4 (93 balls)
Ben Duckett 65 (52); Tom Curran 3/29 (20 balls)		Sam Billings 40* (34); James Neesham 2/23 (20 balls)

Oval Invincibles won by 6 wickets
The Oval, London
Attendance: 21,279
Umpires: Neil Mallender and Alex Wharf
Player of the match: Sam Billings (Oval Invincibles)

- Oval Invincibles won the toss and elected to field.
- Points: Oval Invincibles 2, Welsh Fire 0.

3 August 2021
18:30 (N)
Scorecard

Northern Superchargers; 155/3 (100 balls)	v	London Spirit (H); 92/9 (100 balls)
David Willey 81* (45); Mohammad Nabi 1/19 (15 balls)		Eoin Morgan 27 (22); Ben Raine 3/20 (20 balls)

Northern Superchargers won by 63 runs
Lord's, London
Umpires: Nigel Llong and Steve O'Shaughnessy
Player of the match: David Willey (Northern Superchargers)

- Northern Superchargers won the toss and elected to bat.
- Points: Northern Superchargers 2, London Spirit 0.

4 August 2021
19:00 (N)
Scorecard

Oval Invincibles; 172/3 (100 balls)	v	Birmingham Phoenix (H); 174/4 (94 balls)
Colin Ingram 81* (43); Pat Brown 2/34 (20 balls)		Moeen Ali 49 (26); Saqib Mahmood 2/34 (20 balls)

Birmingham Phoenix won by 6 wickets
Edgbaston, Birmingham
Umpires: Peter Hartley and Russell Warren
Player of the match: Chris Benjamin (Birmingham Phoenix)

- Birmingham Phoenix won the toss and elected to field.
- Points: Birmingham Phoenix 2, Oval Invincibles 0.

5 August 2021
19:00 (N)
Scorecard

(H) Manchester Originals; 98/3 (71 balls)	v	Southern Brave
Colin Munro 41* (28); Tymal Mills 1/9 (11 balls)

No result
Old Trafford, Manchester
Umpires: Steve O'Shaughnessy and Tim Robinson

- Southern Brave won the toss and elected to field.
- No further play was possible due to rain.
- Points: Manchester Originals 1, Southern Brave 1.

6 August 2021
19:00 (N)
Scorecard

(H) Welsh Fire; 139/8 (100 balls)	v	Trent Rockets; 140/4 (90 balls)
Glenn Phillips 50 (35); Wahab Riaz 4/30 (20 balls)		Samit Patel 46* (20); Qais Ahmad 2/23 (20 balls)

Trent Rockets won by 6 wickets
Sophia Gardens, Cardiff
Umpires: Rob Bailey and Martin Saggers
Player of the match: Samit Patel (Trent Rockets)

- Trent Rockets won the toss and elected to field.
- Points: Trent Rockets 2, Welsh Fire 0.

7 August 2021
19:00 (N)
Scorecard

Northern Superchargers; 128/6 (100 balls)	v	Southern Brave (H); 131/5 (95 balls)
Dane Vilas 35* (24); Danny Briggs 2/28 (20 balls)		Quinton de Kock 72* (45); Adil Rashid 2/19 (20 balls)

Southern Brave won by 5 wickets
Rose Bowl, Southampton
Umpires: Graham Lloyd and Tim Robinson
Player of the match: Quinton de Kock (Southern Brave)

- Northern Superchargers won the toss and elected to bat.
- Points: Southern Brave 2, Northern Superchargers 0.

8 August 2021
19:00 (N)
Scorecard

(H) Oval Invincibles; 125/6 (65 balls)	v	Trent Rockets; 116/8 (65 balls)
Jason Roy 56* (29); Samit Patel 2/21 (15 balls)		Lewis Gregory 28* (12); Sunil Narine 3/11 (10 balls)

Oval Invincibles won by 9 runs
The Oval, London
Attendance: 19,382
Umpires: Nick Cook and Nigel Llong
Player of the match: Jason Roy (Oval Invincibles)

- Trent Rockets won the toss and elected to field.
- The match was reduced to 65 balls per side due to rain.
- Points: Oval Invincibles 2, Trent Rockets 0.

9 August 2021
18:30 (N)
Scorecard

(H) Birmingham Phoenix; 184/5 (100 balls)	v	Welsh Fire; 91 (74 balls)
Will Smeed 65* (38); David Payne 3/38 (20 balls)		Ian Cockbain 32 (25); Imran Tahir 5/25 (19 balls)

Birmingham Phoenix won by 93 runs
Edgbaston, Birmingham
Umpires: Steve O'Shaughnessy and Tim Robinson
Player of the match: Imran Tahir (Birmingham Phoenix)

- Welsh Fire won the toss and elected to field.
- Imran Tahir (Birmingham Phoenix) took a hat-trick.
- Points: Birmingham Phoenix 2, Welsh Fire 0.

10 August 2021
18:30 (N)
Scorecard

London Spirit; 142/6 (100 balls)	v	Manchester Originals (H); 136/9 (100 balls)
Adam Rossington 46 (29); Tom Hartley 3/27 (20 balls)		Colin Ackermann 53 (40); Brad Wheal 4/17 (20 balls)

London Spirit won by 6 runs
Old Trafford, Manchester
Umpires: Rob Bailey and Martin Saggers
Player of the match: Brad Wheal (London Spirit)

- London Spirit won the toss and elected to bat.
- Points: London Spirit 2, Manchester Originals 0.

11 August 2021
18:30 (N)
Scorecard

Welsh Fire; 144/5 (100 balls)	v	Southern Brave (H); 147/2 (87 balls)
Tom Banton 36 (20); Danny Briggs 2/17 (20 balls)		Quinton de Kock 57* (32); Luke Fletcher 1/24 (15 balls)

Southern Brave won by 8 wickets
Rose Bowl, Southampton
Umpires: David Millns and Russell Warren
Player of the match: Quinton de Kock (Southern Brave)

- Southern Brave won the toss and elected to field.
- Points: Southern Brave 2, Welsh Fire 0.

12 August 2021
19:00 (N)
Scorecard

(H) Northern Superchargers; 200/5 (100 balls)	v	Manchester Originals; 131 (99 balls)
John Simpson 71* (28); Lockie Ferguson 2/37 (20 balls)		Carlos Brathwaite 21 (14); Ben Raine 3/15 (14 balls)

Northern Superchargers won by 69 runs
Headingley, Leeds
Umpires: Rob Bailey and Martin Saggers
Player of the match: John Simpson (Northern Superchargers)

- Manchester Originals won the toss and elected to field.
- Points: Northern Superchargers 2, Manchester Originals 0.

13 August 2021
19:00 (N)
Scorecard

Birmingham Phoenix; 166/6 (100 balls)	v	Trent Rockets (H); 150/9 (100 balls)
Liam Livingstone 50 (31); Sam Cook 2/32 (20 balls)		Steven Mullaney 49 (33); Pat Brown 3/27 (20 balls)

Birmingham Phoenix won by 16 runs
Trent Bridge, Nottingham
Umpires: Peter Hartley and David Millns
Player of the match: Liam Livingstone (Birmingham Phoenix)

- Trent Rockets won the toss and elected to field.
- Points: Birmingham Phoenix 2, Trent Rockets 0.

14 August 2021
19:00 (N)
Scorecard

London Spirit; 146/7 (100 balls)	v	Oval Invincibles (H); 147/8 (95 balls)
Eoin Morgan 41 (20); Tabraiz Shamsi 3/25 (20 balls)		Laurie Evans 67* (37); Brad Wheal 2/23 (20 balls)

Oval Invincibles won by 2 wickets
The Oval, London
Umpires: Nick Cook and Neil Mallender
Player of the match: Laurie Evans (Oval Invincibles)

- London Spirit won the toss and elected to bat.
- Points: Oval Invincibles 2, London Spirit 0.

15 August 2021
19:00 (N)
Scorecard

Manchester Originals; 135/8 (100 balls)	v	Trent Rockets (H); 136/3 (95 balls)
Colin Munro 45 (22); Rashid Khan 3/16 (20 balls)		Dawid Malan 52 (46); Matt Parkinson 2/21 (20 balls)

Trent Rockets won by 7 wickets
Trent Bridge, Nottingham
Umpires: Steve O'Shaughnessy and Russell Warren
Player of the match: Dawid Malan (Trent Rockets)

- Manchester Originals won the toss and elected to bat.
- Points: Trent Rockets 2, Manchester Originals 0.

16 August 2021
19:00 (N)
Scorecard

Oval Invincibles; 134/7 (100 balls)	v	Southern Brave (H); 135/4 (95 balls)
Alex Blake 44* (28); Jake Lintott 3/14 (20 balls)		Colin de Grandhomme 40* (28); Tom Curran 1/8 (15 balls)

Southern Brave won by 6 wickets
Rose Bowl, Southampton
Umpires: Rob Bailey and Martin Saggers
Player of the match: Alex Davies (Southern Brave)

- Southern Brave won the toss and elected to field.
- Points: Southern Brave 2, Oval Invincibles 0.

17 August 2021
18:30 (N)
Scorecard

(H) Northern Superchargers; 143/8 (100 balls)	v	Birmingham Phoenix; 147/2 (74 balls)
Tom Kohler-Cadmore 71 (44); Liam Livingstone 3/25 (20 balls)		Liam Livingstone 92* (40); David Willey 1/26 (10 balls)

Birmingham Phoenix won by 8 wickets
Headingley, Leeds
Umpires: Neil Mallender and Russell Warren
Player of the match: Liam Livingstone (Birmingham Phoenix)

- Birmingham Phoenix won the toss and elected to field.
- Points: Birmingham Phoenix 2, Northern Superchargers 0.

18 August 2021
18:30 (N)
Scorecard

London Spirit; 163/5 (100 balls)	v	Welsh Fire (H); 165/7 (98 balls)
Josh Inglis 72 (45); Ryan Higgins 3/21 (20 balls)		Glenn Phillips 80 (35); Brad Wheal 3/30 (18 balls)

Welsh Fire won by 3 wickets
Sophia Gardens, Cardiff
Attendance: 9,261
Umpires: Nick Cook and Nigel Llong
Player of the match: Glenn Phillips (Welsh Fire)

- Welsh Fire won the toss and elected to field.
- Points: Welsh Fire 2, London Spirit 0.

== Knockout stages ==
=== Women ===
Eliminator			Final
			1	Southern Brave	73 (98 balls)
2	Oval Invincibles	114/7 (100 balls)	2	Oval Invincibles	121/6 (100 balls)
3	Birmingham Phoenix	94 (94 balls)

==== Eliminator ====
20 August 2021
15:00
Scorecard

Oval Invincibles; 114/7 (100 balls)	v	Birmingham Phoenix; 94 (94 balls)
Marizanne Kapp 37 (37); Kirstie Gordon 2/22 (20 balls)		Amy Jones 35 (25); Tash Farrant 4/10 (19 balls)

Oval Invincibles won by 20 runs
The Oval, London
Umpires: Rob Bailey and Anna Harris
Player of the match: Tash Farrant (Oval Invincibles)

- Birmingham Phoenix won the toss and elected to field.

==== Final ====
21 August 2021
15:00
Scorecard

Oval Invincibles; 121/6 (100 balls)	v	Southern Brave; 73 (98 balls)
Marizanne Kapp 26 (14); Anya Shrubsole 2/16 (20 balls)		Fi Morris 23 (26); Marizanne Kapp 4/9 (18 balls)

Oval Invincibles won by 48 runs
Lord's, London
Umpires: Steve O'Shaughnessy and Sue Redfern
Player of the match: Marizanne Kapp (Oval Invincibles)

- Southern Brave won the toss and elected to field.

=== Men ===
Semifinal			Final
			1	Birmingham Phoenix	136/5 (100 balls)
2	Southern Brave	97/3 (68 balls)	2	Southern Brave	168/5 (100 balls)
3	Trent Rockets	96 (91 balls)

==== Eliminator ====
20 August 2021
18:30 (D/N)
Scorecard

Trent Rockets; 96 (91 balls)	v	Southern Brave; 97/3 (68 balls)
Samit Patel 20 (21); Tymal Mills 3/8 (16 balls)		James Vince 45* (27); Marchant de Lange 2/16 (20 balls)

Southern Brave won by 7 wickets
The Oval, London
Umpires: David Millns and Russell Warren
Player of the match: George Garton (Southern Brave)

- Southern Brave won the toss and elected to field.

==== Final ====
21 August 2021
18:30 (D/N)
Scorecard

Southern Brave; 168/5 (100 balls)	v	Birmingham Phoenix; 136/5 (100 balls)
Paul Stirling 61 (36); Adam Milne 2/8 (20 balls)		Liam Livingstone 46 (19); Tymal Mills 1/13 (20 balls)

Southern Brave won by 32 runs
Lord's, London
Attendance: 24,556
Umpires: Martin Saggers and Alex Wharf
Player of the match: Paul Stirling (Southern Brave)

- Birmingham Phoenix won the toss and elected to field.

== Statistics ==
=== Most runs ===
Women
Runs	Player	Team	High score
259	Dane van Niekerk	Oval Invincibles	67 not out
249	Jemimah Rodrigues	Northern Superchargers	92 not out
244	Sophia Dunkley	Southern Brave	58 not out
233	Evelyn Jones	Birmingham Phoenix	64
221	Hayley Matthews	Welsh Fire	71 not out

- Source: ESPN Cricinfo

Men
Runs	Player	Team	High score
348	Liam Livingstone	Birmingham Phoenix	92 not out
232	Ben Duckett	Welsh Fire	65
229	James Vince	Southern Brave	60
225	Moeen Ali	Birmingham Phoenix	59
214	Glenn Phillips	Welsh Fire	80

- Source: ESPN Cricinfo

=== Most wickets ===
Women
Wickets	Player	Team	Best bowling
18	Tash Farrant	Oval Invincibles	4/10
15	Sammy-Jo Johnson	Trent Rockets	4/15
15	Kirstie Gordon	Birmingham Phoenix	3/14
14	Amanda-Jade Wellington	Southern Brave	4/12
12	Kate Cross	Manchester Originals	3/19

- Source: ESPN Cricinfo

Men
Wickets	Player	Team	Best bowling
12	Adam Milne	Birmingham Phoenix	3/15
12	Marchant de Lange	Trent Rockets	5/20
12	Adil Rashid	Northern Superchargers	3/13
12	Rashid Khan	Trent Rockets	3/16
11	Benny Howell	Birmingham Phoenix	2/12

- Source: ESPN Cricinfo
