= Independent Commission for Equity in Cricket =

The Independent Commission for Equity in Cricket (ICEC) was a commission set up in 2021 to investigate racial equality, gender equality and social equality in English cricket. Its report was published in June 2023 and detailed widespread racism, sexism and elitism in the game. On 25 September 2023, the England and Wales Cricket Board (ECB) responded to the report and said they had begun working on new procedures to remedy many of the problems highlighted.

== History ==
The commission was requested by the England and Wales Cricket Board (ECB) in 2021 to respond to the Yorkshire County Cricket Club racism scandal. The ICEC's evidence-gathering received a large response after English cricket was called institutionally racist by Azeem Rafiq at the UK government's Digital, Culture, Media and Sport select committee. In June 2023, the report was published; it was 317 pages long and took evidence from over 4,000 people. Those giving evidence included the current England men's Test captain Ben Stokes, the current women's captain Heather Knight, Joe Root, World Cup-winning skipper Eoin Morgan and Azeem Rafiq - the former Yorkshire player whose allegations of racism at the county were largely responsible for the setting up of the ICEC.

== Commission members ==
The members of the ICEC were:

- Cindy Butts (Chair): Lay member of the House of Commons Speaker’s Committee for the Independent Parliamentary Standards Authority and a lay member of the House of Lords Conduct Committee
- Sir Brendan Barber: Member of the Joint Industry Board for the electrical contracting industry. Chair of the Advisory, Conciliation and Arbitration Service (ACAS) from 2014 to 2020 and General Secretary of the Trades Union Congress (TUC) from 2003 to 2012.
- Zafar Ansari: Barrister and former professional cricketer.
- Michelle Moore: Leadership coach, author, educator and international speaker.
- Dr Michael Collins: Associate Professor of Modern British History at University College, London (UCL).

== Findings ==
The ECB were praised for commissioning the report and opening the game up to wholesale scrutiny. Entitled "Holding up a mirror to cricket", the report was damning and made 44 recommendations for the ECB to consider. The report gives numerous examples of a racist, sexist, elitist and homophobic comments at the highest and lowest levels. There is also a culture of drinking alcohol that alienates women, children and people from ethnically diverse communities.

=== Racism ===
A deep-seated issue of racism is described in cricket. It says that racism in cricket is not confined to "pockets" or "a few bad apples". The report described the routine use of racial slurs and players being told to "go back home".

=== Elitism ===
The report states that class-based discrimination and elitism is prevalent within the game of cricket. Much of which is structural and institutional in nature, caused partly by the lack of cricket in state schools and partly by a pervasive web of patronage and "old boy networks" that exist within the county game, that favour players from private schools.

County age and academy coaches, whose job is to recruit the best junior talent are routinely employed by fee-paying schools creating a conflict of interest that favours selection of the private schools' students ahead of more able state-schooled or Asian players.

A further conflict of interest occurs where the parents of a junior player privately recruit county coaches, often at great expense. The coaches then favour that player for places in the county setup ahead of more able juniors whose parents cannot afford to pay.

In 2023, 45 per cent of professional cricketers had attended a private school, although the privately educated make up less than 7% of the population. Amongst white English players in county academies, those at fee paying schools are 13 times more likely to become professional cricketers.

The commonality of privately educated children in the county setup has led to state-schooled players being called peasants and otherwise insulted.

=== Sexism ===
The report states that it has heard evidence of "a widespread culture of sexism and misogyny, and unacceptable behaviour towards women in both the recreational and professional game". Predatory sexual behaviour is also described.

== Response to the report ==
Sport England wrote: "It's essential that today's report leads to significant and lasting change and cricket as a sport must seize this opportunity to ensure it becomes a safe, welcoming and empowering environment for everyone."

On 30 August the ECB announced that, with immediate effect, the international match fees for England women cricketers would be increased to be the same as for the men, in accordance with one of the ICEC's recommendations. Previously women had been paid 25% of men's fees for white-ball and 15% for Tests.

On 19 September the ECB gave a brief outline of how they planned to address the report's 44 recommendations, at a meeting of county chief executives and other stakeholders. Their response would include diversity training for all those employed in professional cricket.

On 25 September the ECB published its formal response to the report. They accepted "most" of the ICEC report's 44 recommendations, including the setting up of an independent regulator for the game. The ECB's chief executive, Richard Gould, said: "The ICEC report was a massive moment for the sport and a responsibility we take extremely seriously, to bring about the changes we all want to see."

The ECB chairman, Richard Thompson, said: "Cricket hasn't got it right in the past, but this is an opportunity to move forwards together. I'd urge everyone to now come together, to put their energy and effort into delivering these actions, and to playing their part in ensuring cricket becomes England and Wales' most inclusive team sport."

The ECB response says that the ICEC report asked them to carry out about 137 actions in total (some of the 44 recommendations have multiple sub-clauses), and that they have a "positive direction of travel" on 94% of them. However they said that it was not yet possible to commit to all the ICEC's recommendations on equal pay and prize money for men and women in both international and domestic cricket because - "the gap between the value of commercial and media rights for the men's and women's games is still vast. By creating a thriving, viable and robust future for women's and girls' cricket at every level of the game, we can make real progress in closing that gap." "The amount of money that the ECB's got to invest in the game as a whole is not infinite," Claire Taylor told BBC Sport. "The ECB is working within its current knowledge of what its revenues are likely to be from its broadcast deals and so forth over the next few years.

In early December the ECB announced that they were setting up an independent regulator whose remit would include safeguarding, anti-corruption, anti-doping and anti-discrimination. It is to be ring-fenced from the rest of the ECB and a new independent cricket regulatory board will be set up to oversee its work. Dave Lewis, a former police officer, was named as interim director, with a permanent director to be appointed in 2024.
