= England Lions cricket team in the West Indies in 2018 =

International cricket series

England Lions tour of the West Indies, 2018
	West Indies 'A'	England Lions
- Dates: 11 February 2018 – 11 March 2018
Captains	Kieran Powell	Keaton Jennings

Test series
- Result: West Indies 'A' won the 3-match series 3–0
Most runs	Shane Dowrich (236)	Haseeb Hameed (167)
Most wickets	Jomel Warrican (31)	Jack Leach (18)

One Day International series
- Results: West Indies 'A' won the 3-match series 2–1
Most runs	Jermaine Blackwood (155)	Sam Hain (219)
Most wickets	Keemo Paul (8)	Matt Parkinson (8)

The England Lions cricket team toured the West Indies between 11 February 2018 and 11 March 2018, playing three first-class matches and three limited over fixtures.

== Test Series ==
=== Squads ===
West Indies A (Cricket West Indies)	England Lions
Kieran Powell (c); Shamarh Brooks; Jermaine Blackwood; John Campbell; Rahkeem Cornwall; Miguel Cummins; Shane Dowrich; Jahmar Hamilton; Keon Joseph; Jeremiah Louis; Raymon Reifer; Vishaul Singh; Jomel Warrican	Keaton Jennings (c); Joe Clarke; Liam Livingstone; Sam Curran; Paul Coughlin; Saqib Mahmood; Nick Gubbins; Alex Davies; Jamie Porter; Haseeb Hameed; Dan Lawrence; Ben Foakes; Toby Roland-Jones; Jack Leach; Mason Crane; Josh Tongue

=== 1st Unofficial Test ===
11–14 February 2018
Scorecard

England Lions	v	(Cricket West Indies) West Indies A
252 (107.5 overs); Paul Coughlin 60 (118); Rahkeem Cornwall 5/68 (37.5 overs)		279 (96 overs); Shane Dowrich 119 (222); Jack Leach 3/84 (34 overs)
132 (59.3 overs); Haseeb Hameed 39 (94); Jomel Warrican 7/33 (23.3 overs)		108/8 (29.4 overs); Kieran Powell 30 (33); Jack Leach 5/26 (13 overs)

West Indies A won by 2 wickets
Trelawny Stadium, Jamaica
Umpires: Verdayne Smith (WI) and Chris Wright (WI)
Player of the match: Jomel Warrican (West Indies A)

- West Indies A won the toss and elected to bowl

=== 2nd Unofficial Test ===
18–21 February 2018
Scorecard

England Lions	v	(Cricket West Indies) West Indies A
145 (57 overs); Joe Clarke 56 (114); Jomel Warrican 8/34 (20 overs)		422 (110.4 overs); Jahmar Hamilton 100 (186); Jack Leach 6/138 (41.4 overs)
260 (100.2 overs); Liam Livingstone 48 (121); Jomel Warrican 4/69 (27.2 overs)

West Indies A won by an innings and 17 runs
Sabina Park, Kingston, Jamaica
Umpires: Verdayne Smith (WI) and Chris Wright (WI)
Player of the match: Jomel Warrican (West Indies A)

- West Indies A won the toss and elected to bowl
- Liam Livingstone (England Lions) passed 2000 first-class runs.
- Alex Davies (England Lions) passed 2500 first-class runs.

=== 3rd Unofficial Test ===
26 Feb–01 March 2018
Scorecard

England Lions	v	(Cricket West Indies) West Indies A
102 (54.1 overs); Haseeb Hameed 48 (130); Jomel Warrican 6/33 (18.1 overs)		236 (76.2 overs); Shamarh Brooks 63 (130); Saqib Mahmood 3/50 (17 overs)
195 (70.3 overs); Haseeb Hameed 26 (78); Jomel Warrican 5/55 (27.3 overs)		9/273d (88.3 overs); Jahmar Hamilton 79 (147); Dominic Bess 5/88 (34 overs)

West Indies A won by 212 runs
Sir Vivian Richards Stadium, North Sound, Antigua
Umpires: Deighton Butler (WI) and Carl Tuckett (WI)
Player of the match: Jomel Warrican (West Indies A)

- West Indies A won the toss and elected to bat
- Dominic Bess (England Lions) passed 50 first-class wickets.
- Jomel Warrican (West Indies A) passed 200 first-class wickets.

== ODI Series ==
=== Squads ===
West Indies A (Cricket West Indies)	England Lions
Kieran Powell (c); Jahmar Hamilton; Jermaine Blackwood; Roston Chase; Rahkeem Cornwall; Chandrapaul Hemraj; Kavem Hodge; Andre McCarthy; Keemo Paul; Raymon Reifer; Romario Shepherd; Odean Smith; Jomel Warrican	Keaton Jennings (c); Joe Clarke; Liam Livingstone; Sam Curran; Paul Coughlin; Saqib Mahmood; Nick Gubbins; Alex Davies; Jamie Porter; Sam Northeast; Liam Dawson; Dom Bess; Tom Helm; George Garton; Matt Parkinson

=== 1st Unofficial ODI ===
06 March
09:30
scorecard

England Lions; 267 (49.4 overs)	v	(Cricket West Indies) West Indies A 272 (49.5 overs)
Sam Hain 144 (122); Keemo Paul 5/49 (10 overs)		Jermaine Blackwood 99 (115); Matt Parkinson 2/33 (10 overs)

West Indies A won by 5 runs
Coolidge Cricket Ground, Antigua
Umpires: Nigel Duguid (WI) and Jonathan Blades (WI)
Player of the match: Jermaine Blackwood (West Indies A)

- West Indies A won the toss and elected to bat
- Dominic Bess (England Lions) made his List A debut.
- Kieran Powell (West Indies A) passed 2000 List A runs.

=== 2nd Unofficial ODI ===
09 March
09:30
scorecard

England Lions; 231 (48.4 overs)	v	(Cricket West Indies) West Indies A 256/9 (50 overs)
Alex Davies 38 (62); Jomel Warrican 3/41 (10 overs)		Keemo Paul 55 (40); Sam Curran 3/41 (10 overs)

West Indies A won by 25 runs
Coolidge Cricket Ground, Antigua
Umpires: Nigel Duguid (WI) and Jonathan Blades (WI)
Player of the match: Keemo Paul (West Indies A)

- West Indies A won the toss and elected to bat
- Sam Curran (England Lions) passed 50 List A wickets.

=== 3rd Unofficial ODI ===
11 March
09:30
scorecard

England Lions; 171/3 (31.1 overs)	v	(Cricket West Indies) West Indies A 170 (38.1 overs)
Sam Hain 54* (63); Rahkeem Cornwall 2/26 (10 overs)		Roston Chase 67 (90); Matt Parkinson 4/26 (8.1 overs)

England Lions won by 7 wickets
Coolidge Cricket Ground, Antigua
Umpires: Nigel Duguid (WI) and Jonathan Blades (WI)
Player of the match: Matt Parkinson (England Lions)

- West Indies A won the toss and elected to bat
- Sam Northeast (England Lions) passed 2500 List A runs.
