= English cricket team in Bangladesh in 2016–17 =

International cricket tour

	Bangladesh	England
- Dates: 3 October – 1 November 2016
Captains	Mushfiqur Rahim (Tests); Mashrafe Mortaza (ODIs)	Alastair Cook (Tests); Jos Buttler (ODIs)

Test series
- Result: 2-match series drawn 1–1
Most runs	Tamim Iqbal (231)	Ben Stokes (128)
Most wickets	Mehidy Hasan (19)	Ben Stokes (11); Moeen Ali (11)
- Player of the series: Mehidy Hasan (Ban)

One Day International series
- Results: England won the 3-match series 2–1
Most runs	Imrul Kayes (169)	Ben Stokes (148)
Most wickets	Mashrafe Mortaza (8)	Adil Rashid (10)
- Player of the series: Ben Stokes (Eng)

The England cricket team toured Bangladesh in October and November 2016 to play three One Day Internationals (ODIs), two Test matches and three tour matches. A terrorist attack in Dhaka four months before the tour started raised concerns about team safety. This led to two members of the England team, regular one-day captain Eoin Morgan and opener Alex Hales, withdrawing from selection.

England won the ODI series 2–1. The Test series finished 1–1, with Bangladesh recording their first ever Test win against England, by 108 runs, in the second Test. The Bangladesh captain, Mushfiqur Rahim, said that "it's a great moment for Bangladesh cricket". In response to the defeat England captain Alastair Cook said "it's not easy for me to say, but it's a good win for Bangladesh cricket".

== Security concerns ==
Following a terrorist attack in Dhaka in July 2016, the England and Wales Cricket Board (ECB) said it would follow advice from the Bangladesh government on the forthcoming tour. In response the president of the Bangladesh Cricket Board (BCB), Nazmul Hassan, said that "England are coming after three months, by which time the situation in Bangladesh will get better". England's limited-overs captain Eoin Morgan said there were "big concerns" regarding the security of the England team following the attack. The BCB later rejected any plans to the matches at a neutral venue, should England pull out of the tour to Bangladesh. Bangladesh captain Mashrafe Mortaza said he was "hopeful" that the tour would go ahead. Zimbabwean Richard Halsall, Bangladesh's fielding coach, said that he feels safe working in Bangladesh and is hopeful of England's arrival.

In August the ECB sent a delegation to do a security inspection of venues in Mirpur, Chittagong and Fatullah. Following the inspection, the ECB confirmed that the tour would go ahead as planned. Following the confirmation that the tour would go ahead, England's director of cricket, Andrew Strauss, said that it is 100% safe to tour Bangladesh. Nazmul Hassan, the BCB president, said that the BCB would provide security for player's family members, journalists and travelling England fans.

Some England players talked about safety evaluations before confirming their participation but Moeen Ali was the first England player to confirm he would go to Bangladesh, saying "If selected, I'll definitely go". Andrew Strauss gave a deadline of 10 September 2016 for players to confirm their commitment to the tour and on 11 September the ECB announced that Alex Hales and Morgan both declined to tour. The England supporters' group, the Barmy Army, said there was "too much risk" for fans to travel to Bangladesh and later confirmed they would not be following the tour.

Jos Buttler was appointed captain of the ODI side in Morgan's absence. Buttler said that Morgan remains "very much the captain" and his choice not to tour Bangladesh "won't divide the dressing room". Morgan returned to his role of ODI captain when England tour India in November. Ahead of the ODI series, the Bangladesh Army ran a security drill to evacuate players.

== Squads ==
Tests		ODIs	
Bangladesh	England	Bangladesh	England
Mushfiqur Rahim (c, wk); Tamim Iqbal (vc); Mominul Haque; Mehidy Hasan; Nurul Hasan; Shakib Al Hasan; Shuvagata Hom; Mosaddek Hossain; Shafiul Islam; Taijul Islam; Imrul Kayes; Mahmudullah; Kamrul Islam Rabbi; Sabbir Rahman; Subashis Roy; Soumya Sarkar	Alastair Cook (c); Joe Root (vc); Moeen Ali; ~~James Anderson~~; Zafar Ansari; Jonny Bairstow (wk); Jake Ball; Gary Ballance; Gareth Batty; Stuart Broad; Jos Buttler (wk); Ben Duckett; Steven Finn; Haseeb Hameed; Adil Rashid; Ben Stokes; Chris Woakes; ~~Mark Wood~~	Mashrafe Mortaza (c); Taskin Ahmed; Shakib Al Hasan; Al-Amin Hossain; Mosaddek Hossain; ~~Mosharraf Hossain~~; Nasir Hossain; Tamim Iqbal; Shafiul Islam; Taijul Islam; Imrul Kayes; Mahmudullah; Mushfiqur Rahim (wk); Sabbir Rahman; Soumya Sarkar	Jos Buttler (c, wk); Ben Stokes (vc); Moeen Ali; Jonny Bairstow (wk); Jake Ball; Sam Billings (wk); Liam Dawson; Ben Duckett; Steven Finn; Liam Plunkett; Adil Rashid; Jason Roy; James Vince; David Willey; Chris Woakes; ~~Mark Wood~~

James Anderson and Mark Wood withdrew from the England squads before the tour started due to injury. Jake Ball was added to the Test squad and Steven Finn to the ODI squad to replace them. Taijul Islam was added to Bangladesh's squad for the third ODI as a replacement for Mosharraf Hossain. Subashis Roy and Mosaddek Hossain were added to Bangladesh's squad for the second Test. Hossain was a backup to Sabbir Rahman while Shafiul Islam was rested. However, a few days later the Bangladesh team announced that Sabbir Rahman would be fit for the second Test.

== Tour matches ==
=== One-day:Bangladesh Cricket Board Select XI vs England XI ===
4 October 2016
Scorecard

Bangladesh Cricket Board Select XI; 309/9 (50 overs)	v	England XI; 313/6 (46.1 overs)
Imrul Kayes 121 (91); Chris Woakes 3/52 (9 overs)		Jos Buttler 80* (64); Ebadot Hossain 2/26 (5 overs)

England XI won by 4 wickets
Khan Shaheb Osman Ali Stadium, Fatullah
Umpires: Masudur Rahman (Ban) and Sharfuddoula (Ban)

- Bangladesh Cricket Board Select XI won the toss and elected to bat.
- 14 players per side (11 batting, 11 fielding).

=== Two-day:Bangladesh Cricket Board XI vs England XI ===
14–15 October 2016
Scorecard

England XI	v	Bangladesh Cricket Board XI
137/4 (45 overs); Ben Duckett 59 (63); Sabbir Rahman 3/27 (9 overs)		136/4 (44 overs); Shahriar Nafees 51 (79); Gareth Batty 2/31 (10 overs)

Match drawn
M. A. Aziz Stadium, Chittagong
Umpires: Anisur Rahman (Ban) and Masudur Rahman (Ban)

- England XI won the toss and elected to bat.
- No play was possible on Day 1 due to a wet outfield.
- 12 players per side (11 batting, 11 fielding).

=== Two-day:Bangladesh Cricket Board XI vs England XI ===
16–17 October 2016
Scorecard

Bangladesh Cricket Board XI	v	England XI
294 (74.4 overs); Abdul Mazid 106 (95); Zafar Ansari 4/68 (16.4 overs)		256 (78.2 overs); Ben Duckett 60 (101); Tanveer Haider 4/53 (14 overs)

Match drawn
M. A. Aziz Stadium, Chittagong
Umpires: Anisur Rahman (Ban) and Gazi Sohel (Ban)

- Bangladesh Cricket Board XI won the toss and elected to bat.
- 14 players per side (11 batting, 11 fielding).

== ODI series ==
=== 1st ODI ===
7 October 2016 (D/N)
Scorecard

England; 309/8 (50 overs)	v	Bangladesh; 288 (47.5 overs)
Ben Stokes 101 (100); Mashrafe Mortaza 2/52 (10 overs)		Imrul Kayes 112 (119); Jake Ball 5/51 (9.5 overs)

England won by 21 runs
Sher-e-Bangla National Cricket Stadium, Mirpur
Umpires: Marais Erasmus (SA) and Sharfuddoula (Ban)
Player of the match: Jake Ball (Eng)

- England won the toss and elected to bat.
- Jake Ball and Ben Duckett (Eng) both made their ODI debuts.
- Ben Stokes (Eng) scored his maiden ODI century.
- Jake Ball (Eng) took his maiden ODI five-wicket haul and became the first player for England to take five wickets on debut in an ODI.

=== 2nd ODI ===
9 October 2016 (D/N)
Scorecard

Bangladesh; 238/8 (50 overs)	v	England; 204 (44.4 overs)
Mahmudullah 75 (88); Chris Woakes 2/40 (9 overs)		Jos Buttler 57 (57); Mashrafe Mortaza 4/29 (8.4 overs)

Bangladesh won by 34 runs
Sher-e-Bangla National Cricket Stadium, Mirpur
Umpires: Aleem Dar (Pak) and Sharfuddoula (Ban)
Player of the match: Mashrafe Mortaza (Ban)

- England won the toss and elected to field.

=== 3rd ODI ===
12 October 2016 (D/N)
Scorecard

Bangladesh; 277/6 (50 overs)	v	England; 278/6 (47.5 overs)
Mushfiqur Rahim 67* (62); Adil Rashid 4/43 (10 overs)		Ben Duckett 63 (68); Mashrafe Mortaza 2/51 (10 overs)

England won by 4 wickets
Zohur Ahmed Chowdhury Stadium, Chittagong
Umpires: Anisur Rahman (Ban) and Marais Erasmus (SA)
Player of the match: Adil Rashid (Eng)

- England won the toss and elected to field.
- Tamim Iqbal (Ban) became the first player for Bangladesh to score 5,000 runs in ODIs.

== Test series ==
=== 1st Test ===
20–24 October 2016
Scorecard

England	v	Bangladesh
293 (105.5 overs); Moeen Ali 68 (170); Mehidy Hasan 6/80 (39.5 overs)		248 (86 overs); Tamim Iqbal 78 (179); Ben Stokes 4/26 (14 overs)
240 (80.2 overs); Ben Stokes 85 (151); Shakib Al Hasan 5/85 (33 overs)		263 (81.3 overs); Sabbir Rahman 64* (102); Gareth Batty 3/65 (17 overs)

England won by 22 runs
Zohur Ahmed Chowdhury Stadium, Chittagong
Umpires: Kumar Dharmasena (SL) and Chris Gaffaney (NZ)
Player of the match: Ben Stokes (Eng)

- England won the toss and elected to bat.
- Alastair Cook became the most capped player for England in Tests (134).
- Kamrul Islam Rabbi, Mehidy Hasan, Sabbir Rahman (Ban) and Ben Duckett (Eng) all made their Test debuts.
- Gareth Batty (Eng) became the player who missed the greatest number of Test matches between appearances (142).
- In the first innings, Jonny Bairstow (Eng) became the first player to score 1,000 Test runs in a calendar year batting at number 6 or lower. He then became the highest scoring wicketkeeper in a calendar year in the second innings.
- Mehidy Hasan (Ban) became the seventh and youngest Bangladesh player to take a five-wicket haul on debut in a Test.
- Shakib Al Hasan (Ban) became the first Bangladesh player to take 150 Test wickets.
- This was the first time that Bangladesh took all 20 wickets against England in a Test and the first Test in Bangladesh when all 40 wickets were taken.
- This was England's narrowest win against Bangladesh, their narrowest win in Asia and Bangladesh's narrowest defeat in terms of runs in Tests.

=== 2nd Test ===
28 October–1 November 2016
Scorecard

Bangladesh	v	England
220 (63.5 overs); Tamim Iqbal 104 (147); Moeen Ali 5/57 (19.5 overs)		244 (81.3 overs); Joe Root 56 (122); Mehidy Hasan 6/82 (28 overs)
296 (66.5 overs); Imrul Kayes 78 (120); Adil Rashid 4/52 (11.5 overs)		164 (45.3 overs); Alastair Cook 59 (117); Mehidy Hasan 6/77 (21.3 overs)

Bangladesh won by 108 runs
Sher-e-Bangla National Cricket Stadium, Mirpur
Umpires: Kumar Dharmasena (SL) and Sundaram Ravi (Ind)
Player of the match: Mehidy Hasan (Ban)

- Bangladesh won the toss and elected to bat.
- Play on day one was reduced to 77 overs due to rain.
- Zafar Ansari (Eng) made his Test debut.
- Chris Woakes and Adil Rashid's 99-run partnership was England's highest ninth-wicket partnership in Tests in Asia.
- Mehidy Hasan's 19-wicket haul was the best for Bangladesh in a Test series.
- Mehidy Hasan's match figures of 12/159 were the best by a Bangladesh bowler in a Test match.
- This was Bangladesh's first Test win against England.
