= Ben Duckett =

English cricketer (born 1994)

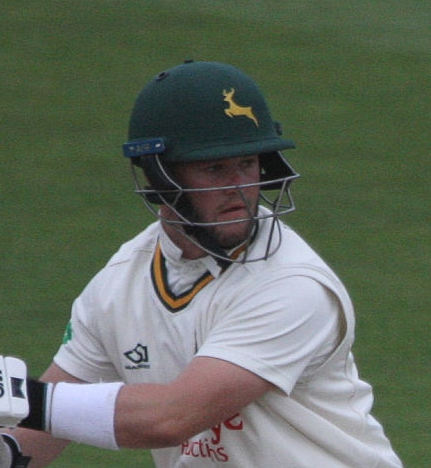

Personal information
- Full name: Ben Matthew Duckett
- Born: 17 October 1994 (age 32); Farnborough, London, England
- Height: 1.70 m (5 ft 7 in)
- Batting: Left-handed
- Bowling: Right-arm off break
- Role: Top-order batter

International information
- National side: England (2016–present)
- Test debut (cap 672): 20 October 2016 v Bangladesh
- Last Test: 9 September 2026 v Pakistan
- ODI debut (cap 246): 7 October 2016 v Bangladesh
- Last ODI: 18 November 2026 v Australia
- ODI shirt no.: 17
- T20I debut (cap 84): 5 May 2019 v Pakistan
- Last T20I: 3 February 2026 v Sri Lanka
- T20I shirt no.: 17

Domestic team information
- Years: Team
- 2012–2018: Northamptonshire
- 2017: Islamabad United
- 2018/19: Hobart Hurricanes
- 2018: Nelson Mandela Bay Giants
- 2019–present: Nottinghamshire
- 2021–2022: Welsh Fire
- 2021/22: Brisbane Heat
- 2022: Quetta Gladiators
- 2023–2025: Birmingham Phoenix
- 2024/25: Melbourne Stars
- 2026: Trent Rockets

Career statistics
Competition	Test	ODI	T20I	FC
Matches	49	47	21	176
Runs scored	3,364	2,125	527	12,406
Batting average	38.22	46.19	27.73	42.48
100s/50s	7/16	7/10	0/3	32/57
Top score	182	167	84	282*
Catches/stumpings	37/–	16/–	13/–	152/3
- Source: ESPNcricinfo, 18 November 2026

Ben Matthew Duckett (born 17 October 1994) is an English international cricketer who plays for the England cricket team as a top-order batsman in all formats of the game. Duckett represents Nottinghamshire in domestic cricket and Trent Rockets in The Hundred.

== Domestic, under 19 and national career ==
=== County cricket ===
Duckett made his debut for Northamptonshire in the 2012 Friends Life t20 against Gloucestershire on 8 July 2012, whilst in his first year of A-levels at Stowe School. During the 2015 season, he scored four centuries in the County Championship, just managing to break the barrier of a thousand first-class runs in the season, with 1002 at an average of 52.73.

The 2016 season was one of conspicuous success for Duckett. He began the season with a new highest score of 282 not out against Sussex. He scored three other first-class hundreds during the season, scoring 185, 189 and 205, with a total of 1338 runs at 58.17 and played in the semi-final and final of the Twenty20 Blast for Northants. He finished on the winning team in the final, and had particular success in the semi-final, scoring 84 off just 47 balls, and sharing a 132 run partnership with Alex Wakely.

At the end of the season, Duckett was named as the young cricketer of the year by both the Cricket Writers' Club and the Professional Cricketers' Association (PCA). He was also named PCA Player of the Year, the first player to win both PCA awards in the same season.

Duckett joined Nottinghamshire in August 2018. In March 2019, he scored a double century for the club against Cambridge MCCU during the 2019 Marylebone Cricket Club University Matches from 168 balls. It was the fastest first-class double century by a Nottinghamshire batsman, in terms of balls faced.

Duckett scored an unbeaten 53 off 38 balls to guide Nottinghamshire to a six-wicket victory in the 2020 T20 Blast final against Surrey.

During the 2022 County Championship season he scored 1,012 runs at an average of 72.28, including three centuries, as Nottinghamshire won Division Two. He signed a new three-year contract at the club in December 2022 and a further two-year extension in May 2025.

=== Under-19 career and national team ===
Duckett was included in the England Under-19 squad for the 2012 ICC Under-19 Cricket World Cup.

In July 2016, Duckett was selected for the England Lions squad for the series against Pakistan A and Sri Lanka A. In the first match, he scored 163 not out off just 104 balls. In the sixth match against Sri Lanka A, he scored 220* off just 131 balls during an unbeaten second wicket partnership of 367 with Daniel Bell-Drummond.

=== Franchise cricket ===
He played for the Welsh Fire in the first two editions of The Hundred. In the 2021 season, he captained the team. His performances gained widespread praise, despite a disappointing season for the team – being named in the team of the tournament by ESPNCricinfo. In the 2022 tournament, he again scored over 200 runs despite Welsh Fire ending the season without a win. He left the franchise in 2023, joining Birmingham Phoenix as their first pick of the draft.

In December 2025, he was bought by the Delhi Capitals in the auction for the 2026 Indian Premier League tournament for his base price of ₹2 crore (equivalent to ₹2.1 crore or US$220,000 in 2026).

== International career ==
=== 2016 Bangladesh ===
Duckett was selected in the squad for the Test and ODI matches in the tour of Bangladesh. He made his England debut in the first ODI against Bangladesh. He scored 60 as England made 309 to win the game by 21 runs. He was out for a duck in the second game, which England lost. He returned to form in the final game, top scoring for England with 63 to help them chase down Bangladesh's target of 278 and win the match by four wickets to win the series 2–1.

Duckett made his Test debut against Bangladesh following his good performances in the ODI team. He scored 14 in the first innings as England scored 293 in their first innings, before making 15 in the second innings as England won by 22 runs. He made seven in the first innings of the second Test, and scored his maiden Test half-century in the second innings, scoring 56, although England lost by 108 runs.

=== 2016 India ===
Duckett was selected for the tour to India though for batting at 4 with Haseeb Hameed opening. In the first Test between the two teams, he made 13 in the first innings and did not bat in the second as the match ended in a draw. In the second Test, he made five as England were dismissed for 255, and was out for a duck in the second innings as England went on to lose the match by 246 runs. He was dropped after the 2nd Test after a relatively poor series.

=== 2017–18 Ashes tour ===
Duckett was deselected from the England senior team picked to face a Cricket Australia XI as part the 2017–18 Ashes tour following an incident in a Perth bar. Duckett was alleged to have poured a drink over teammate James Anderson. Duckett was later suspended from playing in the final three England Lions games of the tour, and issued with a fine. He was also dropped for the 2018 England Lions tour of the West Indies on account of the incident.

=== 2019 Pakistan ===
In April 2019, Duckett was added to England's Twenty20 International (T20I) squad for their one-off match against Pakistan. He made his T20I debut for England against Pakistan on 5 May 2019.

=== 2020 ===
On 29 May 2020, Duckett was named in a 55-man group of players to begin training ahead of international fixtures starting in England following the COVID-19 pandemic. On 9 July 2020, Duckett was included in England's 24-man squad to start training behind closed doors for the ODI series against Ireland.

=== 2022 ===
Duckett came into the England team on a tour of Pakistan in late 2022. He was seen as having the skill necessary for the so-called Bazball style of cricket adopted by the England team under Ben Stokes and Brendon McCullum. The decision brought immediate success with Zak Crawley and Duckett scoring the fastest ever England century opening stand (83 balls), and Crawley and Duckett scoring the fastest double-century partnership in Test cricket history (233 balls). Duckett remained in the team for the rest of the series.

=== 2023 ===
Duckett continued to perform for England scoring 151 runs in a two Test series against New Zealand. He made his highest Test score of 182 against Ireland in June. Duckett also played in the 2023 Ashes, scoring 321 runs including two fifties, which was drawn 2–2. In September he made his first One Day International century with an unbeaten 107 off 78 balls against Ireland at Bristol County Ground.

=== 2024 ===
In May 2024, he was named in England’s squad for the 2024 ICC Men's T20 World Cup tournament. Selected for the home Test series against the West Indies, Duckett made 71 off 59 deliveries, including a 32-ball 50 and 14 boundaries, in first innings of the second Test at Trent Bridge. He then hit 76 from 92 balls in the second innings.

=== 2025 ===
In February 2025, Ben Duckett made history with a brilliant innings in the ICC Champions Trophy, albeit in a match England would go on to lose. Ben Duckett scored 165 runs off 143 balls against Australia, hitting 17 fours and three sixes. This was the highest individual score ever in the tournament’s history until Ibrahim Zadran broke Duckett's record in the 8th match between Afghanistan and England in ICC Champions Trophy. Duckett also recorded the fifth-highest ODI score for England and the fourth-highest in Pakistan.

In June 2025, Duckett was named in the squad for England in the five match home test series against India. In the first test, he received the man of the match award, scoring 62 in the first innings and 149 in the second, anchoring an England chase of 371. He was later selected for the 2025-26 Ashes series but struggled, failing to reach 50 once in 10 innings.

== International Centuries ==
List of Test centuries scored by Ben Duckett
No.	Score	Opponent	Venue	Date	Result	Ref
1	107	Pakistan	Rawalpindi Cricket Stadium, Rawalpindi	1 December 2022	Won	
2	182	Ireland	Lord's, London	1 June 2023	Won	
3	153	India	Niranjan Shah Stadium, Rajkot	15 February 2024	Loss	
4	114	Pakistan	Multan Cricket Stadium, Multan	15 October 2024	Loss	
5	140	Zimbabwe	Trent Bridge, Nottingham	22 May 2025	Won	
6	149	India	Headingley, Leeds	20 June 2025	Won	
7	113	New Zealand	Trent Bridge, Nottingham	25 June 2026	Loss	

=== One Day International centuries ===
No.	Runs	Balls	Opponent	Venue	Date	Result
1	107*	78	Ireland	County Ground, Bristol	26 September 2023	No Result
2	107	91	Australia	County Ground, Bristol	29 September 2024	Loss
3	165	143	Australia	Gaddafi Stadium, Lahore	22 February 2025	Loss
4	141	135	India	Lord's, London	19 July 2026	Won
5	105	111	Pakistan	Gaddafi Stadium, Lahore	25 October 2026	Lost
6	167	132	Sri Lanka	Gaddafi Stadium, Lahore	29 October 2026	Won
7	133	115	Australia	Bellerive Oval, Hobart	18 November 2026	Won
