= Akbar Ansari =

Cricketer (born 1988)

Personal information
- Full name: Akbar Shahzaman Ansari
- Born: 3 July 1988 (age 38); Reading, Berkshire, England
- Batting: Right-handed
- Bowling: Leg-break
- Role: All-rounder
- Relatives: Khizar Humayun Ansari (father); Zafar Ansari (brother)

Domestic team information
- Years: Team
- 2008–2013: Cambridge UCCE

Career statistics
| Competition | FC | LA |
|---|---|---|
| Matches | 17 | 1 |
| Runs scored | 675 | 0 |
| Batting average | 30.68 | 0.00 |
| 100s/50s | 2/1 | 0/0 |
| Top score | 193 | 0 |
| Balls bowled | 812 | 24 |
| Wickets | 14 | 0 |
| Bowling average | 43.21 | – |
| 5 wickets in innings | 0 | – |
| 10 wickets in match | 0 | – |
| Best bowling | 4/50 | – |
| Catches/stumpings | 5/– | 0/– |
- Source: CricketArchive, 26 April 2017

Akbar Shahzaman Ansari (Sindhi: اڪبر شاهزمان انصاري; born 3 July 1988) is an English First-class and List A cricketer of Pakistani descent who played for Cambridge University Cricket Club and Cambridge University Centre of Cricketing Excellence, and List A cricket for Marylebone Cricket Club. He captained Cambridge UCCE in 2009, and Cambridge University in 2009 and 2010. His highest score of 193 came when playing for Cambridge University in the match against Oxford University Cricket Club. His best bowling of 4/50 came in the same match.

His only List A appearance against Bangladesh A he scored 0 and did not take a wicket. He has a younger brother, Zafar Ansari.

He also played 3 Second Eleven Championship games for Surrey's Second XI. and 2 games for them in the Second Eleven Trophy.

He was educated at Hampton School and Trinity Hall, Cambridge.
