= Matt Parkinson (cricketer) =

English cricketer (born 1996)

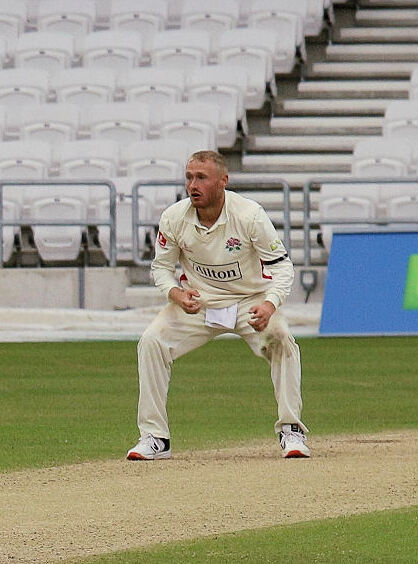
- Parkinson in 2022

Personal information
- Full name: Matthew William Parkinson
- Born: 24 October 1996 (age 30); Bolton, Manchester, England
- Batting: Right-handed
- Bowling: Right-arm leg break
- Role: Bowler
- Relatives: Callum Parkinson (twin-brother)

International information
- National side: England (2019–2022)
- Only Test (cap 705): 2 June 2022 v New Zealand
- ODI debut (cap 256): 4 February 2020 v South Africa
- Last ODI: 13 July 2021 v Pakistan
- T20I debut (cap 91): 5 November 2019 v New Zealand
- Last T20I: 9 July 2022 v India

Domestic team information
- Years: Team
- 2016–2023: Lancashire (squad no. 28)
- 2021–2022: Manchester Originals
- 2022/23: Mashonaland Eagles
- 2023: → Durham (on loan)
- 2023: → Kent (on loan) (squad no. 28)
- 2024–: Kent (squad no. 28)

Career statistics
| Competition | Test | ODI | FC | LA |
|---|---|---|---|---|
| Matches | 1 | 5 | 82 | 59 |
| Runs scored | 8 | 7 | 691 | 136 |
| Batting average | 8.00 | – | 8.74 | 13.60 |
| 100s/50s | 0/0 | 0/0 | 0/0 | 0/0 |
| Top score | 8 | 7* | 48 | 19 |
| Balls bowled | 93 | 208 | 15,113 | 2,973 |
| Wickets | 1 | 5 | 253 | 94 |
| Bowling average | 47.00 | 40.60 | 33.03 | 28.29 |
| 5 wickets in innings | 0 | 0 | 9 | 2 |
| 10 wickets in match | 0 | 0 | 1 | 0 |
| Best bowling | 1/47 | 2/28 | 7/126 | 5/51 |
| Catches/stumpings | 0/– | 1/– | 19/– | 6/– |
- Source: Cricinfo, 27 September 2026

Matthew William Parkinson (born 24 October 1996) is an English professional cricketer who plays for Kent County Cricket Club. He made his international debut for the England cricket team in November 2019. Parkinson made his Test debut for England in June 2022, as a concussion substitute. His twin brother, Callum, plays cricket for Durham CCC.

== Domestic career ==
A leg-spin bowler, Parkinson, who was born at Bolton and educated at Bolton School, made his first-class debut on 20 June 2016 for Lancashire against Warwickshire in the 2016 County Championship, taking 5 for 49 in the first innings. He made his Twenty20 debut for Lancashire in the 2017 NatWest t20 Blast on 16 July 2017.

In January 2022, Parkinson signed a contract extension to keep him at Lancashire until the end of the 2023 season. In April 2022, he was bought by the Manchester Originals for the 2022 season of The Hundred.

In June 2023, it was announced that Parkinson would join Kent at the end of the season.

== International career ==
Parkinson toured the West Indies with the England Lions in 2017-18, taking 4 for 26 in the final 50-over match against West Indies A and winning the player of the match award.

In September 2019, Parkinson was named in England's Test and Twenty20 International (T20I) squads for their series against New Zealand. He made his T20I debut for England, against New Zealand, on 5 November 2019. The following month, Parkinson was named in England's One Day International (ODI) squad for their series against South Africa. He made his ODI debut on 4 February 2020, for England against South Africa. Later the same month, Parkinson was also named in England's Test squad for their series against Sri Lanka.

On 29 May 2020, Parkinson was named in a 55-man group of players to begin training ahead of international fixtures starting in England following the COVID-19 pandemic. On 17 June 2020, Parkinson was included in England's 30-man squad to start training behind closed doors for the Test series against the West Indies. On 9 July 2020, Parkinson was also included in England's 24-man squad to start training behind closed doors for the ODI series against Ireland. However, on 21 July 2020 in the first intra-squad practice match, Parkinson suffered an ankle injury, and was ruled out of the ODI series.

In December 2020, Parkinson was named as one of seven reserve players in England's Test squad for their series against Sri Lanka. In January 2021, he was also named as a reserve player in England's Test squad for their series against India. In February 2022, Parkinson was again named in England's Test squad, this time for their series against the West Indies.

In the final ODI of the 2021 Pakistan Tour of England, Parkinson bowled Imam-ul-Haq, placing the ball in the rough, and generating a large amount of turn. The ball was stated to be the 'biggest spinning ball in the history of ODI cricket', as the ball spun 12.1 degrees.

Parkinson made his Test debut on 2 June 2022, for England against New Zealand, as a concussion substitute replacing Jack Leach.
