= George Garton =

English cricketer (born 1997)

Personal information
- Full name: George Henry Simmons Garton
- Born: 15 April 1997 (age 29); Brighton, East Sussex, England
- Height: 183 cm (6 ft 0 in)
- Batting: Left-handed
- Bowling: Left-arm fast medium
- Role: Bowling Allrounder

International information
- National side: England (2022)
- Only T20I (cap 93): 26 January 2022 v West Indies

Domestic team information
- Years: Team
- 2016–2023: Sussex (squad no. 15)
- 2021–2023: Southern Brave
- 2021: Royal Challengers Bangalore
- 2021/22: Adelaide Strikers (squad no. 15)
- 2022/23: Joburg Super Kings
- 2024–present: Warwickshire
- 2024/25: Sydney Thunder
- 2025: Manchester Originals
- 2025/26: Abu Dhabi Knight Riders

Career statistics
Competition	T20I	FC	LA	T20
Matches	1	26	32	122
Runs scored	2	650	313	835
Batting average	2.00	21.66	19.56	14.91
100s/50s	0/0	0/5	1/0	0/0
Top score	2	97	117	46
Balls bowled	24	2,990	942	1,773
Wickets	1	55	29	100
Bowling average	57.00	37.25	34.24	26.77
5 wickets in innings	0	1	0	0
10 wickets in match	0	0	0	0
Best bowling	1/57	5/26	4/43	4/16
Catches/stumpings	0/–	14/–	14/–	39/–
- Source: Cricinfo, 11 August 2026

George Henry Simmons Garton (born 15 April 1997) is an English international cricketer who plays for the England national cricket team and Warwickshire County Cricket Club. He is a left-handed batsman who bowls left-arm fast. He made his international debut for England in January 2022.

== Domestic career ==
Garton made his first-class debut for Sussex against the Leeds/Bradford MCC University side in April 2016. Prior to his first-class debut, Garton was named in England's U19 squad for the 2016 Under-19 Cricket World Cup.

In August 2020, in the third round of matches in the 2020 Bob Willis Trophy, Garton took his maiden five-wicket haul in first-class cricket. In 2021, he was drafted by Southern Brave for the inaugural season of The Hundred. He was the second highest wicket taker for Southern Brave with 10 wickets in 9 matches.

On 25 August 2021, Garton was included in the Royal Challengers Bangalore squad for the second phase of the 2021 Indian Premier League (IPL) in the UAE. He made his IPL debut on 29 September 2021 against Rajasthan Royals. In April 2022, he was bought by the Southern Brave for the 2022 season of The Hundred.

In September 2022 Garton was bought by the Joburg Super Kings for the inaugural season in the SA20 league in 2023.

In November 2023 Garton joined Warwickshire, having previously worked under Bears first-team coach Mark Robinson at Sussex.

On 23 July 2026, he made his maiden List A century, scoring 117 for Warwickshire against Nottinghamshire at the John Fretwell Sporting Complex.

== International career ==
In November 2017, Garton was added to England's Test squad for the 2017–18 Ashes series as cover for Jake Ball.

In June 2021, Garton was named in England's One Day International (ODI) squad for their series against Sri Lanka.

In December 2021, Garton was named in England's Twenty20 International (T20I) squad for their series against the West Indies. He made his T20I debut on 26 January 2022, for England against the West Indies.

== Education ==
Garton was educated at Hurstpierpoint College.
