= Richard Gould =

English sports administrator (born 1970)

Richard Alan Gould

CEO of England and Wales Cricket Board
- Incumbent
- Assumed office February 2023
- Preceded by: Tom Harrison

Personal details
- Born: 1970 (age 55–56)
- Spouse: Rebecca Gould (née Yelland)
- Education: Cranfield University (JDSC)
- Occupation: Sports executive

Military service
- Allegiance: United Kingdom
- Branch/service: British Army
- Years of service: 1990–2001
- Rank: Major
- Commands: Royal Tank Regiment

Richard Alan Gould (born 1970) is a British military officer, executive and sports administrator, who since February 2023 has been CEO of the England and Wales Cricket Board.

== Early life ==
The younger son of retired football manager Bobby Gould, he was educated at Bristol Grammar School (1981–88) before entering the Royal Military Academy, Sandhurst (SMC, Strategic and Military Leadership 1989–90). He then pursued further studies at Cranfield University (JDSC, Military and Strategic Leadership 1996) and Harvard Business School (AMP, Business/Commerce, General 2006).

Commissioned into the 1st Royal Tank Regiment, Gould was a tank commander (1990–2001), being promoted Major before leaving the army and entering sports administration.

== Career ==
Gould was Commercial Director of Bristol City Football Club (2001–05). He subsequently became CEO of Somerset County Cricket Club (2005–11), before joining Surrey County Cricket Club where he replaced Paul Sheldon at the Oval as CEO (2011–21).

Gould's departure from Surrey CCC was announced on 14 May 2021 upon his appointment as Chief Executive of Bristol City FC.

In October 2022 Gould was appointed Chief Executive of the England and Wales Cricket Board, taking office in February 2023.

Gould is an Honorary Life Vice President of Surrey CCC and a member of Marylebone Cricket Club.
