= Stephen Smith (cricketer) =

English cricketer

Stephen Smith (8 April 1822 – 20 February 1890) was an English first-class cricketer who played for Marylebone Cricket Club (MCC), the Gentlemen of Kent and Kent County Cricket Club.

Smith was born in Camberwell in Surrey in 1822. He played in seven first-class matches as a batsman, scoring 75 runs with a highest score of 41. As well as playing first-class matches, Smith is known to have played club cricket for MCC and the Gentlemen of Kent as well as organised by the Earl of Darnley.

Smith died at Blackheath in Kent in 1890. He was aged 67.

== Bibliography ==
- Carlaw, Derek (2020). Kent County Cricketers, A to Z: Part One (1806–1914) (PDF). Cardiff: ACS.
