= Richard Thompson (cricket administrator) =

English sports administrator (born 1966)

Richard William Thompson (born 25 October 1966) is a British advertising executive then sports administrator, who since 2022 serves as Chairman of the England and Wales Cricket Board.

== Life ==
Educated at Cheam High School in Surrey, Thompson joined a computer sales company in Croydon before founding sport and entertainment talent agency, Merlin Elite (now M&C Saatchi Merlin) in 2002.

After selling a 60% stake in the firm to M&C Saatchi in 2013, Thompson continued as Chairman of M&C Saatchi Talent, where he acquired other talent agencies including Red Hare and Grey Whippet. In 2021, he was appointed non-executive Chairman of the M&C Saatchi UK Group.

Thompson has held various chairmanships including of Debrett's Limited (2012–18), Mana Group (2014–18), Twofour Group (2014–19) and South Shore Productions since 2019. A keen cricketer, he served as Chairman of Surrey County Cricket Club (2010–22), before being elected Chairman of the ECB in 2022.

An Honorary Life Vice-President of Surrey CCC, Thompson was elected a member of BAFTA and admitted as a Freeman of the Haberdashers' Company as well as to the Freedom of the City of London in 2023.

He founded and is chair of the Sport United Against Dementia (SUAD) campaign which has raised millions for Alzheimer's Society.

== See also ==
- England and Wales Cricket Board

Sporting positions
| Preceded by Clare Connor (acting) | Chairman, England and Wales Cricket Board; 2022– | Succeeded by in office |
