= Alex Davies (cricketer) =

English cricketer (born 1994)

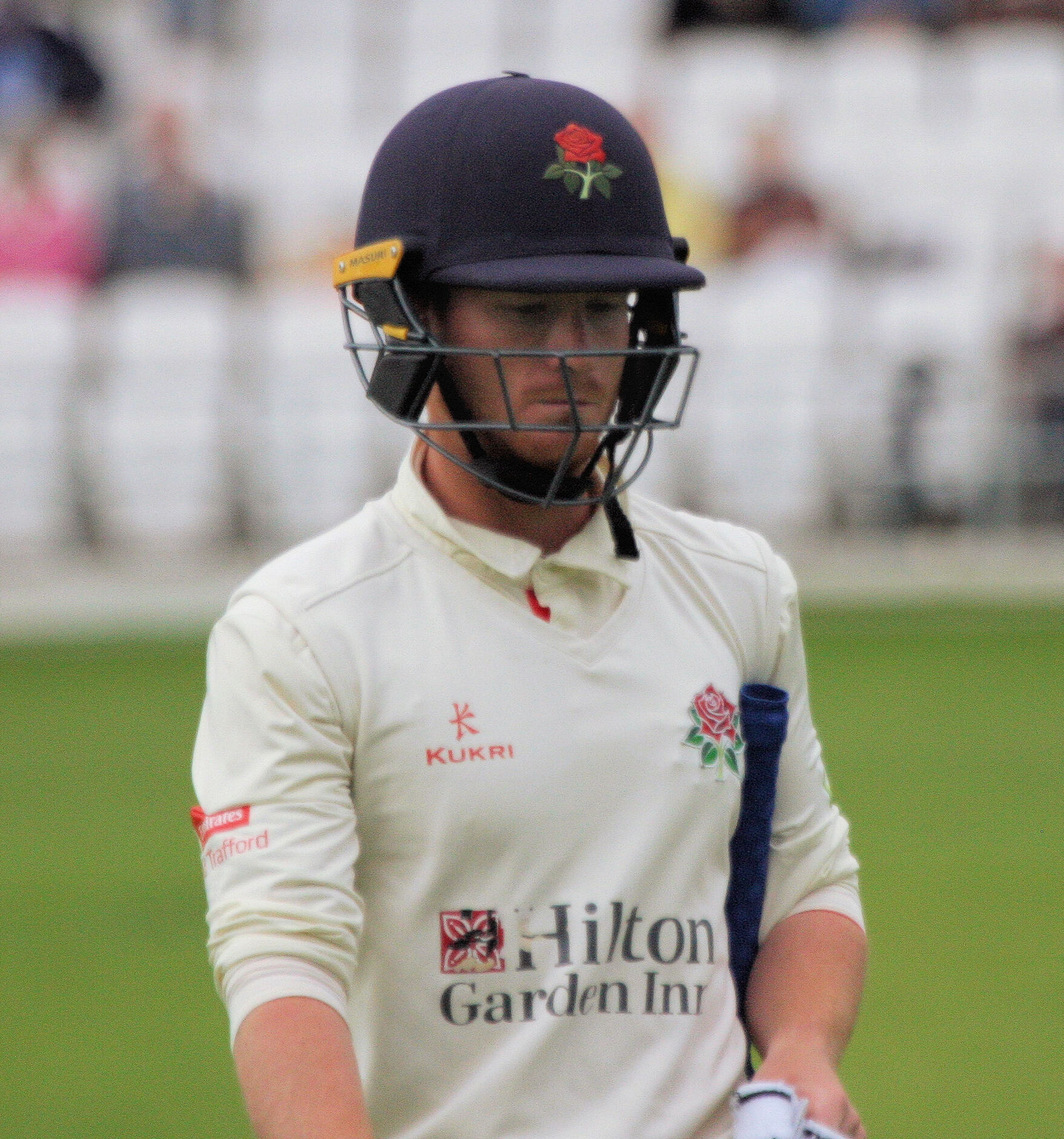
- Davies in 2021

Personal information
- Full name: Alexander Luke Davies
- Born: 23 August 1994 (age 32); Darwen, Lancashire, England
- Batting: Right-handed
- Role: Wicket-keeper

Domestic team information
- Years: Team
- 2011–2021: Lancashire (squad no. 17)
- 2021–2024: Southern Brave (squad no. 17)
- 2022–present: Warwickshire (squad no. 71)
- First-class debut: 11 September 2012 Lancashire v Surrey
- List A debut: 21 August 2011 Lancashire v Glamorgan

Career statistics
Competition	FC	LA	T20
Matches	158	67	170
Runs scored	7,877	1,829	3,519
Batting average	32.95	31.00	23.93
100s/50s	11/48	2/9	0/19
Top score	256	147	94*
Catches/stumpings	265/21	58/12	99/31
- Source: CricketArchive, 4 September 2026

Alexander Luke Davies (born 23 August 1994) is an English cricketer who plays for Warwickshire. He is a right-handed batsman who also plays as a wicket-keeper. Davies was included in the England Under-19 squad for the 2012 ICC Under-19 Cricket World Cup.

In the 2017 County Championship, he became the first wicket-keeper for Lancashire to score 1,000 runs in a season.

In July 2021, it was announced that Davies would join Warwickshire ahead of the 2022 season on a 3-year deal. In the inaugural season of The Hundred, he was signed by the Southern Brave. He was the joint second highest run scorer for Southern Brave, scoring 202 runs in 10 matches.

In February 2022, Davies was fined and banned from playing in the opening round of the 2022 County Championship over "historic offensive tweets".

In April 2022, he was bought by the Southern Brave for the 2022 season of The Hundred.

Davies was included in the England Lions squad to tour Australia in January 2025.
