= England and Wales Cricket Board =

Governing body of cricket in England and Wales

- Sport: Cricket
- Jurisdiction: England; Wales
- Abbreviation: ECB
- Founded: 1 January 1997 (29 years ago)
- Affiliation: International Cricket Council
- Affiliation date: 15 June 1909 (117 years ago)
- Regional affiliation: ICC Europe
- Affiliation date: 1997; 29 years ago
- Location: Lord's Cricket Ground, London NW8
- Chairman: Richard Thompson
- CEO: Richard Gould
- Sponsor: Cinch, Rothesay, Metro Bank, Vitality, IG, Castore, Chapel Down, Cognizant, Initial, Laithwaites, Rado, SunGod, Zoopla
- Replaced: TCCB

Official website
- www.ecb.co.uk
- (England)

The England and Wales Cricket Board (abbreviated as ECB) is the national governing body of cricket in England and Wales. It was formed on 1 January 1997 as a single governing body to combine the roles formerly fulfilled by the Test and County Cricket Board, the National Cricket Association and the Cricket Council. In April 1998 the Women's Cricket Association was integrated into the organisation. The ECB's head offices are at Lord's Cricket Ground in north-west London.

The board oversees all levels of cricket in England and Wales, including the national teams: England Men (Test, One Day International and T20I), England Women, England Lions (Men's second tier), Physical Disability, Learning Disability, Visually Impaired, and Deaf.

Although the organisation is the England and Wales Cricket Board, it is referred to as the ECB, as a result of a decision by those overseeing the transition from the previous bodies.

The ECB and The Hundred Board agreed an emergency clause allowing gambling firms to sponsor teams in the 2026 season after eight teams had failed to secure non-gambling sponsorships.

== Structure and role ==
The ECB is run by an executive management team that reports directly to the chief executive officer (CEO). Richard Gould took over as permanent CEO in February 2023, replacing Clare Connor, who had held the office on an interim basis since May 2022. He in turn reports to the Chairman of the ECB Board, a position held by Richard Thompson since September 2022.

An executive committee chaired by the CEO is responsible for delivering the ECB's strategic plans. Three other committees – Cricket; Audit, Risk and Governance; and Regulatory – work with the senior management team on policy, planning and strategic issues.

The ECB Management Board is composed of a Chair, a Senior Independent Non-Executive Director, three Independent Non-Executive Directors, five Cricket Non-Executive Directors, the CEO and the Chief Financial Officer.

There are 41 members of the ECB:

- The Chairs of the 18 First-Class Counties
- The Chairs of the 21 County Boards in National Counties (formerly the Minor Counties)
- The Chair of Marylebone Cricket Club (MCC)
- The Chair of the National Counties Cricket Association

One of the main responsibilities of the ECB is the preparation and development of the teams that represent England at the highest level in Test and ODI play. The National Selector, head coach and other coaches are ECB employees. The ECB also employs the English Test match captain and other centrally contracted players, as well as being responsible for the National Cricket Performance Centre, currently based at Loughborough University in Leicestershire.

The long-term strategy to deliver world championships in the men's and women's games had a successful conclusion in the summer of 2019. England won the ICC Cricket World Cup for the first time, emulating the feat of their female counterparts, who had become world champions for the fourth time in 2017.

The ECB is responsible for the financial direction and commercial exploitation of England cricket. It raises revenue from the proceeds of sales for tickets at One Day International and Test matches in England and Wales. The ECB is also responsible for the generation of income from the sale of sponsorship and broadcasting rights, primarily in relation to the English team.

Cricket is one of the most popular sports in the UK. More than 1.1 million adults attend cricket matches each year, while 2.5 million people play the game at all levels in England and Wales. Almost 10 million people – about 20% of the adult population – follow the sport. Since 2009, 4 million schoolchildren have been introduced to cricket by the Chance To Shine programme.

In 2017 the ECB signed a new media rights deal valued at £1.1 billion to cover the five years between 2020 and 2024. This deal will be used to fund a broad range of initiatives across the sport at all levels, including a guaranteed and unprecedented £475 million to fund the county network – First-Class Counties, National Counties and County Boards.

While the ECB administers all aspects of English cricket, the laws of the game remain under the control of MCC.

In April 2017 the Articles of Association were changed to allow a new White-ball Cricket competition to be run from 2020, comprising 8 teams and run during school summer holidays. The T20 event has become The Hundred.

In May 2018 ECB launched an action plan for engaging South Asian audiences in England and Wales. In January 2019 ECB launched its Inspiring Generations strategy for cricket across 2020–2024. The strategy aims to Inspire a generation to say Cricket is a game for me. Alongside its five-year plan, in October 2019 ECB launched plans to transform women's and girls' cricket.

The ECB also leads the sport's efforts with regard to the integrity of cricket, including anti-doping and anti-corruption initiatives, and safeguarding of all who play and administer the game. In the 2017-2018 financial year, the ECB's turnover was £125.5 million.

== National teams ==
Men's Test team: England played in the first Test match, against Australia in 1877, and has been one of the world's leading exponents of the five-day form of cricket ever since. England has been a full member of the International Cricket Council since 1909. The position of Men's Test captain, as of 28 April 2022, is occupied by Ben Stokes.

Men's white ball team: England featured in the first One-Day International, against Australia in 1971. England won the men's Cricket World Cup for the first time in a thrilling final against New Zealand at Lord's in July 2019. As of September 2025, the team's captain was Harry Brook.

Women's team: England featured in the first Women's Test series, against Australia in 1934–35, where they won 2-0 despite the enduring rancour from the Bodyline series of two winters before. They have won the World Cup four times, most recently in 2017. The team is captained, as of September 2025, by Nat Sciver-Brunt.

Disability teams: The ECB aims to have 300 clubs offering disabled provision by 2024. The four teams administered by the ECB are Physical Disability, Learning Disability, Visually Impaired, and Deaf. The ECB has also met with counties regarding Walking Cricket.

== County Cricket ==
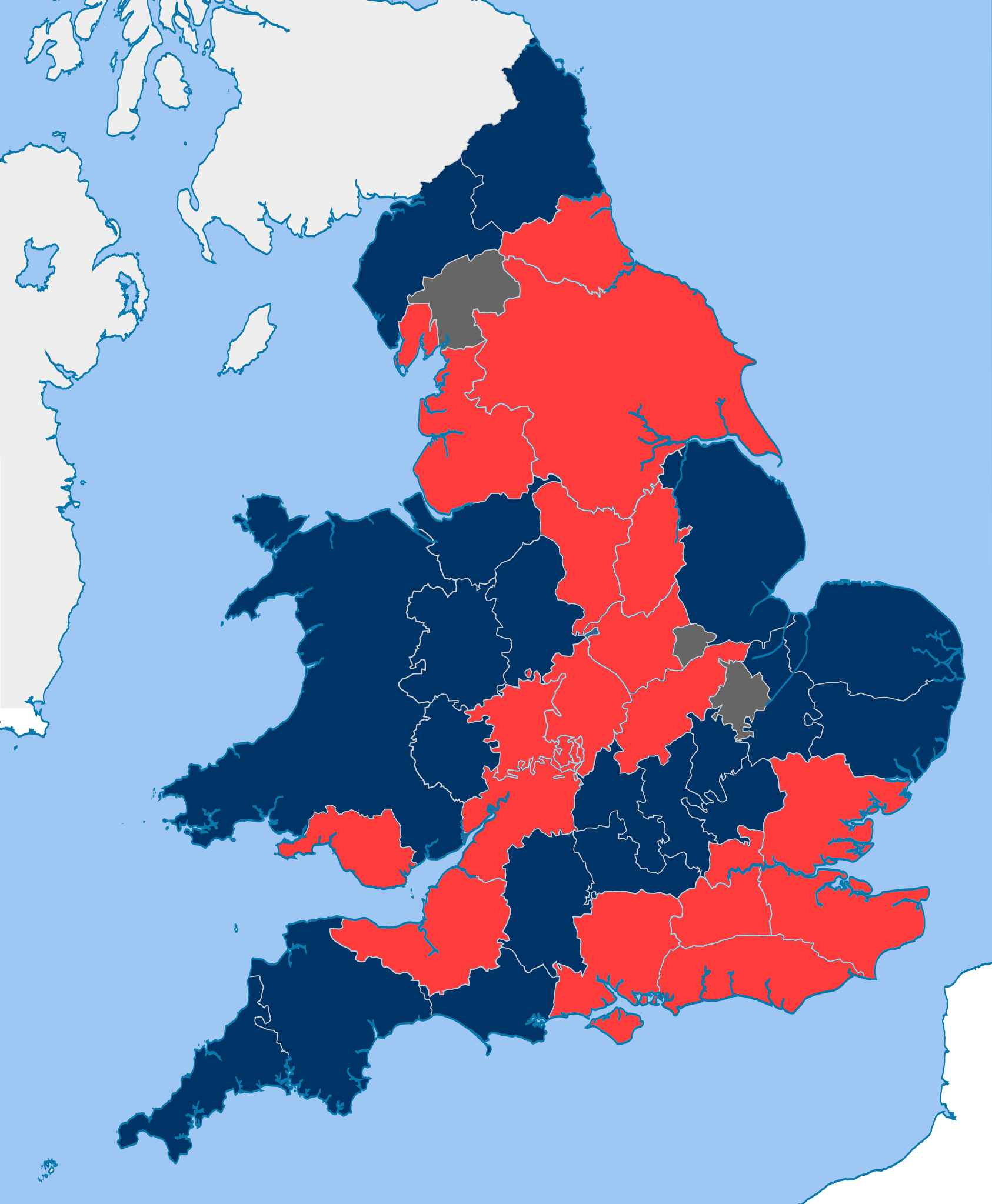
Map of cricket counties: First-Class Counties National Counties (formerly known as Minor Counties) Other counties

First-Class Counties: There are 18 First-Class Counties, 17 in England and one, Glamorgan, in Wales. County cricket developed in the 1740s and the first County Championship was played in 1890. From 2020 onwards there are 10 teams in Division One and eight in Division Two. The ECB plays a part in the administration of a county through the County Partnership Agreement, a structure set up in late 2019 designed to improve two-way communication between the ECB and the counties and to ensure the successful implementation of the inspiring Generations strategy between 2020 and 2024.

National Counties: Formerly known as the Minor Counties, these are the 21 areas where cricket is played on a county-wide basis but without first-class status. The Minor Counties Championship was first staged in 1895. From 2020 onwards, the counties' Western and Eastern divisions are split into two five-team groups between which sides are relegated and promoted. Each county also has a County Partnership Agreement with the ECB.

County Boards: Recreational cricket at all levels in each county is administered by a county board. There are more than 6,500 recreational cricket clubs and 40 county boards in total, including boards for Wales and the Isle of Wight. Each board has a County Partnership Agreement with the ECB. The intention is for the whole of cricket to think collectively about how to work together for the present and future stability and growth of the game.

The ECB also works at grassroots level with organisations such as Chance To Shine that are dedicated to encouraging talented and enthusiastic youngsters to play as much cricket as possible and maximise their potential.

Cricket in Wales: Historically, there have been claims that Wales should break away from the ECB and have its own international team, like Ireland and Scotland. However, Cricket Wales and Glamorgan have consistently supported the ECB and the concept that Welsh players of international standard will continue to represent England.

Domestic competitions: First-class counties compete in the following:

- Rothesay County Championship
- Metro Bank One-Day Cup
- Vitality Blast T20

=== The County Boards ===
Subject to certain exceptions, each historic county in England has either an ECB County Cricket Club or Cricket Board as below. The first-class counties are represented directly at the ECB, whereas the national counties retain a Cricket Board.

- Bedfordshire Cricket Board
- Berkshire Cricket Board
- Buckinghamshire Cricket Board
- Cambridgeshire Cricket Board
- Cheshire Cricket Board
- Cornwall Cricket Board
- Cumbria Cricket Board
- Derbyshire County Cricket Club
- Devon Cricket Board
- Dorset Cricket Board
- Durham County Cricket Club
- Essex County Cricket Club
- Glamorgan County Cricket Club
- Gloucestershire County Cricket Club
- Hampshire County Cricket Club
- Herefordshire Cricket Board
- Hertfordshire Cricket Board
- Huntingdonshire Cricket Board
- Isle of Wight Cricket Board
- Kent County Cricket Club
- Lancashire County Cricket Club
- Leicestershire County Cricket Club
- Lincolnshire Cricket Board
- Middlesex County Cricket Club
- Norfolk Cricket Board
- Northamptonshire County Cricket Club
- Northumberland Cricket Board
- Nottinghamshire County Cricket Club
- Oxfordshire Cricket Board
- Shropshire Cricket Board
- Somerset County Cricket Club
- Staffordshire Cricket Board
- Suffolk Cricket Board
- Surrey County Cricket Club
- Sussex County Cricket Club
- Cricket Wales
- Warwickshire County Cricket Club
- Wiltshire Cricket Board
- Worcestershire County Cricket Club
- Yorkshire County Cricket Club

Rutland shares a board with neighbouring Leicestershire, an echo of the 18th century Leicestershire and Rutland Cricket Club. Hampshire as such has two boards given that the Isle of Wight has its own. Westmorland and Cumberland are replaced by Cumbria, a ceremonial county created in 1974. An additional board exists for the whole country of Wales and is incorporated within the ECB.

Most counties have clubs which are members of either the County Championship or the National Counties Cricket Championship. Rutland and the Isle of Wight do not have county clubs and are wholly integrated for that purpose with Leicestershire and Hampshire respectively. Huntingdonshire County Cricket Club has a chequered history and now plays informal matches only. Cumberland and Westmorland originally shared Cumberland County Cricket Club as a joint county club. It is now representative of Cumbria as a whole and plays matches in both of the two traditional counties; there has never been a club called Westmorland.

== Status of Wales ==
Historically, the England team represented the whole of Great Britain in international cricket, with Scottish or Welsh national teams playing sporadically and players from both countries occasionally representing England. Following Ireland's membership in 1993, Scotland became an independent member of the ICC the next year.

With Welsh players pursuing international careers exclusively with an England team, there have been a number of calls for Wales to become an independent member of the ICC, or for the ECB to provide more fixtures for a Welsh national team. However, both Cricket Wales and Glamorgan County Cricket Club have continually supported the ECB, with Glamorgan arguing for the financial benefits of the Welsh county within the English structure, and Cricket Wales stating they are "committed to continuing to play a major role within the ECB"

The absence of a Welsh cricket team has been debated within the Welsh Parliament. During a 2013 debate, Conservative member Mohammad Asghar said he supported the establishment of an independent Welsh team.

In 2015, a report produced by the Welsh Parliament's petitions committee reflected the passionate debate around the issue. Bethan Jenkins, Plaid Cymru's spokesperson on heritage, culture, sport and broadcasting, and a member of the petitions committee, argued that Wales should have its own international team and withdraw from the ECB. Jenkins said that Ireland (with a population of 6.4 million) was an ICC member with 6,000 club players whereas Wales (with 3.2 million) had 7,500. Jenkins stated: "Cricket Wales and Glamorgan CCC say the idea of a Welsh national cricket team is 'an emotive subject', of course having a national team is emotive, you only have to look at the stands during any national game to see that. To suggest this as anything other than natural is a bit of a misleading argument."

In 2017, the First Minister of Wales, Carwyn Jones called for the reintroduction of the Welsh one day team stating: "[It] is odd that we see Ireland and Scotland playing in international tournaments and not Wales."

In 2019, Plaid Cymru member Jonathan Edwards called for Wales to separate from the England and Wales Cricket Board by 2020 and to establish itself as an independent national team. Edwards said: "We have a Welsh rugby team, football team, basketball team, even a national lacrosse team. In cricket, however, we are still incorporated into England. That surely can't be right."

== Inspiring Generations ==
In 2019 the ECB launched a game-wide strategy to grow interest in, and engagement with, cricket over the five years between 2020 and 2024. Its vision is that by the latter date a new generation of fans will have been inspired to say: "Cricket is a game for me."

Inspiring Generations has been made possible by the signing of a media rights deal worth about £1.1billion, the vast majority of which will be paid by Sky television. As a result, the ECB has identified 26 activities that will make up the overarching Inspiring Generations strategy.

The key focus is on six areas, in which the ECB has pledged to:

- Grow and nurture cricket's core, the county network
- Inspire through the exploits of elite teams
- Make cricket accessible to as many people as possible
- Engage children and young people
- Transform women's and girls' cricket
- Support its communities

== Women's and Girls' Strategy ==
One of the most important elements of the Inspiring Generations strategy is the delivery of a plan to make cricket a truly gender-balanced sport and to build on the significant progress in the women's game in the first two decades of the 21st century.

The ECB has promised by 2021 to invest £20million specifically into the transformation of women's and girls' cricket. This process is built around the following five targets:

- Participation – bringing girls' cricket to more schools and clubs
- Pathway – raising standards in local girls' cricket
- Performance – unveiling a new regional elite domestic structure for the women's game
- Profile – promoting awareness of elite female players
- People – increasing the number of women in the cricket workforce and leadership roles

More than 850 clubs now offer women's and girls' cricket, a total that was fewer than 100 in 2009.

== The Hundred ==
In 2020 the ECB launched a new competition called The Hundred which the board said was designed to appeal to families and younger cricket fans. The new competition, where each side has 100 balls, is aimed at a younger audience with the aim of games being completed in less than three hours.

Eight new teams were created by the ECB and based in cities across England and Wales. The teams do not align with existing counties, though they share stadiums. The team names are:

- Birmingham Phoenix
- London Spirit
- Manchester Super Giants (formerly Manchester Originals)
- SunRisers Leeds (formerly Northern Superchargers)
- MI London (formerly Oval Invincibles)
- Southern Brave
- Trent Rockets
- Welsh Fire

The competition also sees the return after 15 years of live cricket to free-to-air television, with a contract seeing the BBC screening at least ten matches live from the men's competition, including the final.

The launch of The Hundred competition was planned for 2020, but was officially delayed to 2021 as a result of the COVID-19 pandemic.

== The South Asian Action Plan ==
In 2018, the ECB launched an initiative designed to increase engagement in cricket in England and Wales among people who trace their ancestry to nations in south Asia – such as India, Pakistan, Bangladesh and Sri Lanka – where cricket has historically been hugely popular.

The decision was taken to engage with this community in particular because more than 30% of active cricketers in England and Wales at the time identified as being of South Asian extraction.

The SAAP was driven by research and community-led in an attempt to break down barriers to playing and watching cricket.

The 11 principal action points included installing non-traditional playing facilities in urban areas and delivering cricket at schools with a higher than national average representation of BAME pupils.

One significant early success was the opening in 2019 of the Leyton Cricket Hub in east London, the first urban cricket centre of its kind in the country. The SAAP also led to the installation of 110 non-turf pitches in urban areas and the recruitment of 600 female volunteers to boost the initiative.

== All Stars Cricket ==
All Stars Cricket is the ECB's entry-level participation programme for boys and girls aged between five and eight. It consists of eight one-hour sessions over eight weeks and the emphasis is on fun and activity.

The programme is designed for all children who are new to cricket and focuses on the sport's specific skills, as well as activity and teamwork in general.

In 2019, more than 67,000 children took part in sessions at more than 2,200 clubs.

== Disability Premier League (DPL) ==
In 2021, the ECB launched the Disability Premier League (DPL), a T20 competition bringing together players from three different disability groups – Physical Disability (PD), Learning Disability (LD) and Hearing Impairment/Deaf. The DPL sits between county cricket at the England international setups in the ECB Disability Cricket pathway. It is designed to benefit disability cricket in a number of ways, including promoting the sport to a new audience and encouraging new players to take up the sport.

There are four teams with 16 players in each squad (64 players overall). Every year, the squads are selected through a draft. Each squad has roughly five players from each impairment, who are also tiered to ensure each team is as evenly balanced as possible. Each disability group must bowl at least 20% of a team's overs, meaning a minimum of four overs are to be bowled at least one player from the PD, LD and Deaf pool.

The teams are:

- Black Cats
- Pirates
- Tridents
- Hawks

== Major domestic competitions ==
- County Championship
- One-Day Cup
- T20 Blast
- The Hundred

== See also ==
- Cricket in England
- Cricket in Wales
- Association of Cricket Officials
