= 2023 One-Day Cup =

Cricket tournament

- Dates: 1 August – 16 September 2023
- Administrator: England and Wales Cricket Board
- Cricket format: Limited overs cricket (50 overs)
- Tournament format(s): Group stage and knockout
- Champions: Leicestershire (1st title)
- Participants: 18
- Matches: 77
- Most runs: Ed Barnard (Warwickshire) (616)
- Most wickets: Oliver Hannon-Dalby (Warwickshire) (24)
- Official website: ecb.co.uk

The 2023 One-Day Cup (also known as for sponsorship reasons as 2023 Metro Bank One Day Cup) was a limited overs cricket competition that formed part of the 2023 domestic cricket season in England and Wales. Matches were contested over 50 overs per side, having List A cricket status, with all eighteen first-class counties competing in the tournament. The tournament started on 1 August 2023, with the final taking place on 16 September 2023 at Trent Bridge in Nottingham. Kent were the defending champions, having won the 2022 tournament.

Leicestershire beat Hampshire by two runs in the final, winning their first List A trophy since 1985.

== Teams ==
The teams were placed into the following groups:

- Group A: Essex, Hampshire, Kent, Lancashire, Leicestershire, Middlesex, Nottinghamshire, Surrey, Yorkshire
- Group B: Derbyshire, Durham, Glamorgan, Gloucestershire, Northamptonshire, Somerset, Sussex, Warwickshire, Worcestershire

== Standings ==
=== Group A standings ===
Pos	Team	Pld	W	L	T	NR	Ded	Pts	NRR
1	Leicestershire	8	7	1	0	0	0	14	1.302
2	Hampshire	8	7	1	0	0	0	14	1.048
3	Lancashire	8	4	2	0	2	0	10	0.827
4	Kent	8	4	4	0	0	0	8	−0.331
5	Nottinghamshire	8	3	4	0	1	0	7	−0.274
6	Yorkshire	8	2	4	0	2	0	6	−1.051
7	Middlesex	8	2	5	0	1	0	5	−0.104
8	Surrey	8	2	5	0	1	0	5	−1.250
9	Essex	8	1	6	0	1	0	3	−0.774

Source: BBC Sport, ECB, Cricinfo.
- Advanced directly to the semi-finals
- Advanced to the quarter-finals

=== Group B standings ===
Pos	Team	Pld	W	L	T	NR	Ded	Pts	NRR
1	Warwickshire	8	7	1	0	0	0	14	1.301
2	Gloucestershire	8	6	2	0	0	0	12	0.830
3	Worcestershire	8	6	2	0	0	0	12	0.533
4	Glamorgan	8	4	3	0	1	0	9	−0.065
5	Durham	8	3	4	0	1	0	7	−0.841
6	Northamptonshire	8	3	5	0	0	0	6	0.391
7	Somerset	8	3	5	0	0	0	6	−0.285
8	Derbyshire	8	2	6	0	0	0	4	−0.470
9	Sussex	8	1	7	0	0	0	2	−1.453

Source: BBC Sport, ECB, Cricinfo.
- Advanced directly to the semi-finals
- Advanced to the quarter-finals

== Group A fixtures ==
1 August 2023
11:00
Scorecard

Middlesex; 309/7 (50 overs)	v	Hampshire; 238/5 (37.1 overs)
Ryan Higgins 78 (53); Scott Currie 3/54 (10 overs)		Fletcha Middleton 100 (101); Sam Robson 2/12 (2.1 overs)

Hampshire won by 18 runs (DLS method)
Rose Bowl, Southampton
Umpires: Neil Bainton and Rob White

- Hampshire won the toss and elected to field.
- Hampshire innings curtailed at 37.1 overs due to rain; DLS par score was 221.
- Blake Cullen (Middlesex), Eddie Jack and Joseph Eckland (Hampshire) all made their List A debuts.
- Points: Hampshire 2, Middlesex 0.

1 August 2023
11:00
Scorecard

Lancashire; 270/7 (36 overs)	v	Essex; 23/2 (6 overs)
Dane Vilas 65 (44); Beau Webster 3/59 (7 overs)		Robin Das 8 (9); Jack Blatherwick 1/9 (3 overs)

No result
Sedbergh School, Sedbergh
Umpires: Peter Hartley and Neil Pratt

- Essex won the toss and elected to field.
- The match was reduced to 36 overs per side due to rain.
- No further play was possible due to rain.
- Thomas Aspinwall, Matthew Hurst (Lancashire), Charlie Allison and Noah Thain (Essex) all made their List A debuts.
- Points: Lancashire 1, Essex 1.

1 August 2023
11:00
Scorecard

Kent; 282/9 (50 overs)	v	Yorkshire; 117/4 (17 overs)
Joey Evison 136 (106); Ben Coad 3/16 (10 overs)		George Hill 35 (18); James Bazley 2/20 (5 overs)

Kent won by 2 runs (DLS method)
North Marine Road, Scarborough
Umpires: Neil Mallender and Surendiran Shanmugam

- Yorkshire won the toss and elected to field.
- Yorkshire innings curtailed at 17 overs; DLS par score was 119
- Dom Leech and James Wharton (Yorkshire) both made their List A debuts.
- Points: Kent 2, Yorkshire 0.

3 August 2023
11:00
Scorecard

Nottinghamshire; 237 (45.5 overs)	v	Essex; 69 (25.1 overs)
Ben Slater 79 (101); Aaron Beard 4/32 (7.5 overs)		Will Buttleman 19* (37); Dane Paterson 4/30 (9 overs)

Nottinghamshire won by 168 runs
County Ground, Chelmsford
Umpires: Ben Peverall and Surendiran Shanmugam

- Essex won the toss and elected to field.
- Calvin Harrison (Nottinghamshire) made his List A debut.
- Points: Nottinghamshire 2, Essex 0.

3 August 2023
11:00
Scorecard

Surrey; 325 (49.5 overs)	v	Leicestershire; 329/5 (42.2 overs)
Ben Foakes 106 (107); Tom Scriven 5/66 (9.5 overs)		Louis Kimber 89* (62); Cameron Steel 2/59 (9.2 overs)

Leicestershire won by 5 wickets
The Oval, London
Umpires: Neil Bainton and Phil Mustard

- Leicestershire won the toss and elected to field.
- Josh Hull (Leicestershire) made his List A debut.
- Points: Leicestershire 2, Surrey 0.

3 August 2023
11:00
Scorecard

Yorkshire	v	Lancashire

Match abandoned
North Marine Road, Scarborough
Umpires: Naeem Ashraf and Sue Redfern

- No toss.
- Points: Yorkshire 1, Lancashire 1.

5 August 2023
11:00
Scorecard

Middlesex	v	Surrey

Match abandoned
Radlett Cricket Club, Radlett

- No toss.
- Points: Middlesex 1, Surrey 1.

5 August 2023
11:00
Scorecard

Nottinghamshire	v	Yorkshire

Match abandoned
Trent Bridge, Nottingham
Umpires: Rob Bailey and Neil Mallender

- No toss.
- Points: Nottinghamshire 1, Yorkshire 1.

6 August 2023
11:00
Scorecard

Leicestershire; 380/5 (50 overs)	v	Kent; 116 (23.5 overs)
Peter Handscomb 87 (67); Matt Parkinson 2/64 (10 overs)		Jack Leaning 25 (23); Roman Walker 6/43 (6.5 overs)

Leicestershire won by 264 runs
County Cricket Ground, Beckenham
Umpires: Anna Harris and Rob White

- Kent won the toss and elected to field.
- Points: Leicestershire 2, Kent 0.

8 August 2023
11:00
Scorecard

Essex; 236/9 (45 overs)	v	Hampshire; 237/6 (43.4 overs)
Beau Webster 73 (99); Keith Barker 3/25 (9 overs)		Nick Gubbins 63 (89); Tom Westley 2/22 (5 overs)

Hampshire won by 4 wickets
Rose Bowl, Southampton
Umpires: Nigel Llong and Jack Shantry

- Essex won the toss and elected to bat.
- The match was reduced to 45 overs per side due to rain.
- Points: Hampshire 2, Essex 0.

8 August 2023
11:00
Scorecard

Leicestershire; 214/9 (44 overs)	v	Nottinghamshire; 206/6 (42 overs)
Wiaan Mulder 84* (92); Tom Loten 3/26 (9 overs)		Lyndon James 82 (90); Josh Hull 4/43 (9 overs)

Nottinghamshire won by 4 wickets (DLS method)
Grace Road, Leicester
Umpires: Sue Redfern and Surendiran Shanmugam

- Nottinghamshire won the toss and elected to field.
- The match was reduced to 44 overs per side due to rain.
- Nottinghamshire were set a revised target of 206 runs from 44 overs.
- Points: Nottinghamshire 2, Leicestershire 0.

9 August 2023
11:00
Scorecard

Lancashire; 328/5 (50 overs)	v	Kent; 203 (39.4 overs)
Josh Bohannon 105 (117); Jas Singh 3/74 (10 overs)		Daniel Bell-Drummond 38 (54); Jack Blatherwick 4/52 (10 overs)

Lancashire won by 125 runs
Stanley Park, Blackpool
Umpires: Neil Mallender and Steve O'Shaughnessy

- Kent won the toss and elected to field.
- Jas Singh (Kent) made his List A debut.
- Points: Lancashire 2, Kent 0.

11 August 2023
14:00 (D/N)
Scorecard

Essex; 298/9 (50 overs)	v	Middlesex; 295 (48.5 overs)
Tom Westley 80 (90); Josh de Caires 3/52 (9 overs)		Mark Stoneman 93 (97); Beau Webster 2/47 (9.5 overs)

Essex won by 3 runs
County Ground, Chelmsford
Umpires: Naeem Ashraf and Paul Nicholls

- Essex won the toss and elected to bat.
- Points: Essex 2, Middlesex 0.

11 August 2023
14:00 (D/N)
Scorecard

Leicestershire; 411/6 (50 overs)	v	Lancashire; 316 (42.2 overs)
Rishi Patel 161 (129); Jack Blatherwick 3/70 (9.3 overs)		Keaton Jennings 127 (109); Uttam Ramji 3/58 (6.2 overs)

Leicestershire won by 95 runs
Old Trafford Cricket Ground, Manchester
Umpires: Anthony Harris and James Tredwell

- Leicestershire won the toss and elected to bat.
- Uttam Ramji (Leicestershire) made his List A debut.
- Points: Leicestershire 2, Lancashire 0.

11 August 2023
11:00
Scorecard

Hampshire; 254 (49.5 overs)	v	Nottinghamshire; 163 (42.2 overs)
Nick Gubbins 119 (123); Dane Paterson 4/41 (9.5 overs)		Matt Montgomery 42 (45); Mason Crane 3/38 (8.2 overs)

Hampshire won by 91 runs
John Fretwell Sporting Complex, Warsop
Umpires: Jack Shantry and Paul Pollard

- Nottinghamshire won the toss and elected to field.
- Points: Hampshire 2, Nottinghamshire 0.

11 August 2023
11:00
Scorecard

Kent; 330/6 (50 overs)	v	Surrey; 243 (43.1 overs)
Jack Leaning 87 (94); Jordan Clark 2/54 (8 overs)		Ryan Patel 68 (67); Matt Parkinson 4/43 (9 overs)

Kent won by 87 runs
The Oval, London
Umpires: Neil Bainton and Nigel Llong

- Kent won the toss and elected to bat.
- Jaydn Denly (Kent) made his List A debut.
- Points: Kent 2, Surrey 0.

13 August 2023
11:00
Scorecard

Essex; 221 (35.4 overs)	v	Yorkshire; 222/5 (45.5 overs)
Michael Pepper 63 (34); Dom Bess 5/37 (7.4 overs)		James Wharton 54* (49); Aron Nijjar 2/43 (10 overs)

Yorkshire won by 5 wickets
County Ground, Chelmsford
Umpires: James Middlebrook and Phil Mustard

- Essex won the toss and elected to bat.
- Points: Yorkshire 2, Essex 0.

13 August 2023
11:00
Scorecard

Hampshire; 296 (48.4 overs)	v	Leicestershire; 298/6 (47.2 overs)
Fletcha Middleton 78 (79); Josh Hull 4/57 (9.4 overs)		Colin Ackermann 93* (93); Ian Holland 2/38 (6 overs)

Leicestershire won by 4 wickets
Rose Bowl, Southampton
Umpires: Paul Baldwin and Paul Nicholls

- Leicestershire won the toss and elected to field.
- Points: Leicestershire 2, Hampshire 0

13 August 2023
11:00
Scorecard

Kent; 288 (49.2 overs)	v	Middlesex; 155 (36.4 overs)
Jack Leaning 68 (68); Ryan Higgins 4/33 (10 overs)		John Simpson 39 (51); Jas Singh 2/17 (5 overs)

Kent won by 133 runs
County Cricket Ground, Beckenham
Umpires: Ben Debenham and James Tredwell

- Kent won the toss and elected to bat.
- Points: Kent 2, Middlesex 0.

13 August 2023
11:00
Scorecard

Surrey; 244/7 (40 overs)	v	Nottinghamshire; 237 (40 overs)
Ben Foakes 68 (64); Brett Hutton 2/45 (8 overs)		Lyndon James 71 (66); Cameron Steel 3/41 (8 overs)

Surrey won by 3 runs (DLS method)
John Fretwell Sporting Complex, Warsop
Umpires: Ben Peverall and Neil Mallender

- Nottinghamshire won the toss and elected to field.
- The match was reduced to 40 overs per side due to rain.
- Surrey were set a revised target of 241 runs from 40 overs.
- Points: Surrey 2, Nottinghamshire 0

15 August 2023
11:00
Scorecard

Hampshire; 234 (47.4 overs)	v	Lancashire; 223 (49 overs)
Nick Gubbins 66 (82); Will Williams 3/30 (8.4 overs)		George Lavelle 57 (82); Brad Wheal 5/47 (10 overs)

Hampshire won by 11 runs
Old Trafford Cricket Ground, Manchester
Umpires: Hassan Adnan and James Middlebrook

- Hampshire won the toss and elected to bat.
- Points: Hampshire 2, Lancashire 0.

15 August 2023
11:00
Scorecard

Essex; 250/8 (50 overs)	v	Leicestershire; 251/8 (48.3 overs)
Charlie Allison 85 (109); Chris Wright 2/50 (10 overs)		Sol Budinger 102 (74); Aron Nijjar 3/34 (10 overs)

Leicestershire won by 2 wickets
Kibworth Cricket Club New Ground, Kibworth
Umpires: Anthony Harris and Rob Bailey

- Essex won the toss and elected to bat.
- Points: Leicestershire 2, Essex 0.

15 August 2023
11:00
Scorecard

Middlesex; 365 (50 overs)	v	Nottinghamshire; 231 (40.1 overs)
Martin Andersson 100 (81); Lyndon James 3/82 (10 overs)		Tom Loten 44 (40); Ethan Bamber 3/32 (7 overs)

Middlesex won by 134 runs
Radlett Cricket Club, Radlett
Umpires: Paul Baldwin and Martin Saggers

- Nottinghamshire won the toss and elected to field.
- Points: Middlesex 2, Nottinghamshire 0.

15 August 2023
11:00
Scorecard

Surrey; 241 (47.5 overs)	v	Yorkshire; 243/9 (48.3 overs)
Ben Geddes 92 (90); Ben Mike 4/40 (7.5 overs)		Harry Duke 93* (132); Cameron Steel 3/49 (10 overs)

Yorkshire won by 1 wicket
Clifton Park Ground, York
Umpires: Neil Mallender and Surendiran Shanmugam

- Yorkshire won the toss and elected to field.
- Points: Yorkshire 2, Surrey 0.

17 August 2023
11:00
Scorecard

Kent; 259/9 (50 overs)	v	Nottinghamshire; 263/9 (49.5 overs)
Daniel Bell-Drummond 79 (89); Lyndon James 4/45 (10 overs)		Matt Montgomery 92* (84); Hamidullah Qadri 4/47 (10 overs)

Nottinghamshire won by 1 wicket
St Lawrence Ground, Canterbury
Umpires: Mansoor Qureshi and Paul Pollard

- Kent won the toss and elected to bat.
- Points: Nottinghamshire 2, Kent 0.

17 August 2023
11:00
Scorecard

Surrey; 153 (37.3 overs)	v	Lancashire; 157/0 (22.1 overs)
Josh Blake 34 (43); Will Williams 4/30 (7 overs)		George Bell 78* (59)

Lancashire won by 10 wickets
Woodbridge Road, Guildford
Umpires: Ben Debenham and Ben Peverall

- Lancashire won the toss and elected to field.
- Points: Lancashire 2, Surrey 0.

17 August 2023
11:00
Scorecard

Hampshire; 311/6 (50 overs)	v	Yorkshire; 134 (31.1 overs)
Tom Prest 105 (118); Ben Mike 3/84 (10 overs)		Dom Bess 24 (34); Ian Holland 3/12 (8 overs)

Hampshire won by 177 runs
Clifton Park Ground, York
Umpires: Naeem Ashraf and Steve O'Shaughnessy

- Yorkshire won the toss and elected to field.
- Points: Hampshire 2, Yorkshire 0.

18 August 2023
14:00 (D/N)
Scorecard

Middlesex; 191 (40.1 overs)	v	Leicestershire; 173/5 (40)
Sam Robson 58 (68); Tom Scriven 3/33 (7.1 overs)		Peter Handscomb 54* (74); Ethan Bamber 3/27 (10 overs)

Leicestershire won by 23 runs (DLS method)
Grace Road, Leicester
Umpires: Alex Wharf and Simon Widdup

- Leicestershire won the toss and elected to field.
- The match was reduced to 47 overs per side due to rain.
- Leicestershire innings curtailed at 40 overs due to rain; DLS par score was 150.
- Points: Leicestershire 2, Middlesex 0.

20 August 2023
11:00
Scorecard

Kent; 287/8 (50 overs)	v	Essex; 227 (44.5 overs)
Jack Leaning 137 (127); Beau Webster 3/38 (7 overs)		Will Buttleman 50* (51); Grant Stewart 2/25 (5.5 overs)

Kent won by 60 runs
St Lawrence Ground, Canterbury
Umpires: Sam Hollingshead and Sue Redfern

- Kent won the toss and elected to bat.
- Points: Kent 2, Essex 0.

20 August 2023
11:00
Scorecard

Yorkshire; 184 (47.5 overs)	v	Leicestershire; 186/4 (42.2 overs)
Ben Coad 45 (52); Matt Salisbury 3/28 (10 overs)		Peter Handscomb 60 (97); Ben Coad 2/33 (10 overs)

Leicestershire won by 6 wickets
Grace Road, Leicester
Umpires: Steve O'Shaughnessy and Neil Pratt

- Leicestershire won the toss and elected to field.
- Points: Leicestershire 2, Yorkshire 0.

20 August 2023
11:00
Scorecard

Lancashire; 303/7 (50 overs)	v	Middlesex; 293 (49.3 overs)
George Lavelle 72 (53); Martin Andersson 3/55 (10 overs)		Ryan Higgins 66 (68); Tom Aspinwall 4/52 (9.3 overs)

Lancashire won by 10 runs
Lord's, London
Umpires: Ben Debenham and Nigel Llong

- Lancashire won the toss and elected to bat.
- Points: Lancashire 2, Middlesex 0.

20 August 2023
11:00
Scorecard

Surrey; 203 (45 overs)	v	Hampshire; 206/2 (33.2 overs)
Ryan Patel 78 (88); Ian Holland 5/35 (10 overs)		Joe Weatherley 100 (100); Dan Moriarty 2/67 (9 overs)

Hampshire won by 8 wickets
Woodbridge Road, Guildford
Umpires: Paul Pollard and Simon Widdup

- Hampshire won the toss and elected to field.
- Tom Ealham (Surrey) made his List A debut.
- Points: Hampshire 2, Surrey 0.

22 August 2023
11:00
Scorecard

Essex; 259/9 (50 overs)	v	Surrey; 261/8 (50 overs)
Beau Webster 69 (86); Conor McKerr 4/55 (10 overs)		Ryan Patel 117 (119); Beau Webster 2/35 (10 overs)

Surrey won by 2 wickets
County Ground, Chelmsford
Umpires: Nigel Llong and Tom Lungley

- Surrey won the toss and elected to field.
- Krish Patel (Surrey) made his List A debut.
- Points: Surrey 2, Essex 0.

22 August 2023
11:00
Scorecard

Kent; 325/8 (50 overs)	v	Hampshire; 326/7 (48.3 overs)
Daniel Bell-Drummond 150 (133); Ian Holland 3/45 (10 overs)		Aneurin Donald 106 (73); Matt Parkinson 4/69 (10 overs)

Hampshire won by 3 wickets
Newclose Ground, Isle of Wight
Umpires: Ben Peverall and Mark Newell

- Kent won the toss and elected to bat.
- Points: Hampshire 2, Kent 0.

22 August 2023
11:00
Scorecard

Yorkshire; 253 (50 overs)	v	Middlesex; 254/5 (34.3 overs)
Shan Masood 96 (129); Ryan Higgins 4/39 (10 overs)		Joe Cracknell 87 (65); Jack Shutt 4/49 (10 overs)

Middlesex won by 5 wickets
Radlett Cricket Club, Radlett
Umpires: Neil Bainton and Rob Bailey

- Yorkshire won the toss and elected to bat.
- Points: Middlesex 2, Yorkshire 0.

22 August 2023
11:00
Scorecard

Nottinghamshire; 185 (48.5 overs)	v	Lancashire; 187/3 (40.5 overs)
Liam Patterson-White 39 (50); Will Williams 3/32 (9.5 overs)		Keaton Jennings 103* (125); Liam Patterson-White 2/54 (9.5 overs)

Lancashire won by 7 wickets
John Fretwell Sporting Complex, Warsop
Umpires: Peter Hartley and Simon Widdup

- Nottinghamshire won the toss and elected to bat.
- Points: Lancashire 2, Nottinghamshire 0.

== Group B fixtures ==
1 August 2023
11:00
Scorecard

Worcestershire; 318/9 (50 overs)	v	Durham; 276 (46.2 overs)
Kashif Ali 76 (59); Liam Trevaskis 4/50 (10 overs)		Graham Clark 79 (70); Josh Baker 3/53 (10 overs)

Worcestershire won by 42 runs
Riverside Ground, Chester-le-Street
Umpires: Naeem Ashraf and Richard Kettleborough

- Durham won the toss and elected to field.
- Ben McKinney (Durham) made his List A debut.
- Points: Worcestershire 2, Durham 0.

1 August 2023
11:00
Scorecard

Derbyshire; 298/9 (50 overs)	v	Gloucestershire; 299/4 (43.2 overs)
Haider Ali 82 (65); Paul van Meekeren 4/66 (10 overs)		Ollie Price 116* (115); Sam Conners 2/43 (8 overs)

Gloucestershire won by 6 wickets
College Ground, Cheltenham
Umpires: Rob Bailey and Mark Newell

- Gloucestershire won the toss and elected to field.
- Points: Gloucestershire 2, Derbyshire 0.

4 August 2023
11:00
Scorecard

Gloucestershire; 278 (48.4 overs)	v	Northamptonshire; 255 (48.1 overs)
Graeme van Buuren 108 (102); Ben Sanderson 3/34 (8 overs)		Tom Taylor 112 (88); Tom Price 4/26 (9.1 overs)

Gloucestershire won by 23 runs
College Ground, Cheltenham
Umpires: Sam Hollingshead and Rob White

- Northamptonshire won the toss and elected to field.
- Joe Phillips (Gloucestershire) made his List A debut.
- Points: Gloucestershire 2, Northamptonshire 0.

4 August 2023
14:00 (D/N)
Scorecard

Somerset; 230 (46.5 overs)	v	Warwickshire; 233/6 (43.4 overs)
Lewis Goldsworthy 78 (99); Jake Lintott 3/43 (10 overs)		Ed Barnard 94 (111); Curtis Campher 3/47 (10 overs)

Warwickshire won by 4 wickets
County Ground, Taunton
Umpires: Anthony Harris and James Tredwell

- Warwickshire won the toss and elected to field.
- Shoaib Bashir (Somerset) made his List A debut.
- Points: Warwickshire 2, Somerset 0.

4 August 2023
11:00
Scorecard

Durham; 427/9 (50 overs)	v	Sussex; 295 (39.1 overs)
Alex Lees 144 (107); Jack Carson 4/83 (9 overs)		Fynn Hudson-Prentice 65 (34); Liam Trevaskis 3/38 (6.1 overs)

Durham won by 132 runs
County Cricket Ground, Hove
Umpires: Ian Blackwell and Paul Nicholls

- Durham won the toss and elected to bat.
- Jack Carson (Sussex) made his List A debut.
- Points: Durham 2, Sussex 0,

4 August 2023
11:00
Scorecard

Glamorgan; 199 (40.2 overs)	v	Worcestershire; 200/6 (41.3 overs)
Ben Kellaway 82 (74); Brett D'Oliveira 3/37 (8.2 overs)		Azhar Ali 78 (104); Kiran Carlson 4/48 (10 overs)

Worcestershire won by 4 wickets
New Road, Worcester
Umpires: Jack Shantry and Simon Widdup

- Worcestershire won the toss and elected to field.
- Alex Horton, Ben Kellaway and Ben Morris (Glamorgan) all made their List A debuts.
- Points: Worcestershire 2, Glamorgan 0.

6 August 2023
11:00
Scorecard

Derbyshire; 298/8 (50 overs)	v	Glamorgan; 299/3 (47.1 overs)
Harry Came 73 (86); Ben Kellaway 3/41 (8 overs)		Colin Ingram 115* (108); Anuj Dal 1/30 (6 overs)

Glamorgan won by 7 wickets
County Ground, Derby
Umpires: James Tredwell and Mansoor Qureshi

- Glamorgan won the toss and elected to field.
- Points: Glamorgan 2, Derbyshire 0.

6 August 2023
11:00
Scorecard

Sussex; 240/7 (45 overs)	v	Northamptonshire; 243/7 (43.4 overs)
Cheteshwar Pujara 106* (119); Jack White 3/29 (9 overs)		Tom Taylor 42* (23); Brad Currie 2/18 (5 overs)

Northamptonshire won by 3 wickets
County Ground, Northampton
Umpires: Anthony Harris and Surendiran Shanmugam

- Sussex won the toss and elected to bat.
- The match was reduced to 45 overs per side due to rain.
- Justin Broad (Northamptonshire) made his List A debut.
- Points: Northamptonshire 2, Sussex 0.

6 August 2023
11:00
Scorecard

Somerset; 287/9 (50 overs)	v	Worcestershire; 251 (44.3 overs)
James Rew 101 (93); Ben Gibbon 3/58 (9 overs)		Ben Cox 58 (66); Curtis Campher 3/51 (8.3 overs)

Somerset won by 36 runs
County Ground, Taunton
Umpires: Sam Hollingshead and Simon Widdup

- Cameron Jones (Worcestershire) made his List A debut.
- Points: Somerset 2, Worcestershire 0.

7 August 2023
11:00
Scorecard

Gloucestershire; 120 (33.4 overs)	v	Warwickshire; 123/2 (25.5 overs)
Jack Taylor 55 (65); Oliver Hannon-Dalby 3/14 (8 overs)		Will Rhodes 36* (27); Tom Price 1/20 (7 overs)

Warwickshire won by 8 wickets
Edgbaston, Birmingham
Umpires: Graham Lloyd and Neil Pratt

- Warwickshire won the toss and elected to field.
- Points: Warwickshire 2, Gloucestershire 0.

8 August 2023
11:00
Scorecard

Glamorgan	v	Durham

Match abandoned
The Gnoll, Neath
Umpires: Anthony Harris and David Millns

- No toss.
- No play was possible due to rain.
- Points: Glamorgan 1, Durham 1.

9 August 2023
11:00
Scorecard

Sussex; 299/8 (50 overs)	v	Derbyshire; 302/2 (41.4 overs)
Tom Haines 94 (112); Suranga Lakmal 4/60 (10 overs)		Harry Came 94 (76); Archie Lenham 2/61 (10 overs)

Derbyshire won by 8 wickets
County Ground, Derby
Umpires: Ben Peverall and Peter Hartley

- Derbyshire won the toss and elected to field.
- Points: Derbyshire 2, Sussex 0.

9 August 2023
11:00
Scorecard

Northamptonshire; 415/8 (50 overs)	v	Somerset; 328 (45.1 overs)
Prithvi Shaw 244 (153); Jack Brooks 3/75 (9 overs)		Andrew Umeed 77 (67); Rob Keogh 4/49 (9.1 overs)

Northamptonshire won by 87 runs
County Ground, Northampton
Umpires: James Tredwell and Tom Lungley

- Northamptonshire won the toss and elected to bat.
- Points: Northamptonshire 2, Somerset 0.

10 August 2023
11:00
Scorecard

Warwickshire; 331/7 (50 overs)	v	Glamorgan; 307 (47.1 overs)
Rob Yates 102 (114); Ben Kellaway 3/56 (7 overs)		Sam Northeast 69 (89); Oliver Hannon-Dalby 4/43 (10 overs)

Warwickshire won by 24 runs
The Gnoll, Neath
Umpires: Hassan Adnan and Paul Baldwin

- Glamorgan won the toss and elected to field.
- Michael Booth (Warwickshire) made his List A debut
- Points: Warwickshire 2, Glamorgan 0

10 August 2023
14:00 (D/N)
Scorecard

Worcestershire; 375/7 (50 overs)	v	Gloucestershire; 290 (48.3 overs)
Gareth Roderick 137 (114); Tom Smith 2/70 (10 overs)		Jack Taylor 121 (106); Logan Van Beek 4/58 (9.3 overs)

Worcestershire won by 85 runs
New Road, Worcester
Umpires: Anna Harris and David Millns

- Gloucestershire won the toss and elected to field.
- Points: Worcestershire 2, Gloucestershire 0

11 August 2023
11:00
Scorecard

Durham; 333/8 (50 overs)	v	Derbyshire; 306 (47.1 overs)
Graham Clark 89 (78); Alex Thomson 3/53 (9 overs)		Wayne Madsen 65 (58); Migael Pretorius 4/56 (9 overs)

Durham won by 27 runs
Riverside Ground, Chester-le-Street
Umpires: Simon Widdup and Mansoor Qureshi

- Derbyshire won the toss and elected to field.
- Luke Robinson (Durham) made his List A debut.
- Points: Durham 2, Derbyshire 0

11 August 2023
11:00
Scorecard

Somerset; 318/6 (50 overs)	v	Sussex; 319/6 (48.1 overs)
Andrew Umeed 119 (130); Fynn Hudson-Prentice 3/50 (10 overs)		Cheteshwar Pujara 117* (113); Josh Thomas 2/57 (10 overs)

Sussex won by 4 wickets
County Ground, Taunton
Umpires: Ben Peverall and Surendiran Shanmugam

- Somerset won the toss and elected to bat.
- JT Langridge (Somerset) made his List A debut.
- Points: Sussex 2, Somerset 0

13 August 2023
11:00
Scorecard

Durham; 198 (43.2 overs)	v	Northamptonshire; 204/4 (25.4 overs)
Liam Trevaskis 37 (34); Luke Procter 4/34 (9 overs)		Prithvi Shaw 125 (76); George Drissell 3/46 (6.4 overs)

Northants won by 6 wickets
Riverside Ground, Chester-le-Street
Umpires: Anthony Harris and Surendiran Shanmugam

- Durham won the toss and elected to bat.
- Points: Northamptonshire 2, Durham 0

13 August 2023
11:00
Scorecard

Gloucestershire; 454/3 (50 overs)	v	Somerset; 256 (38.2 overs)
James Bracey 224* (151); George Thomas 1/44 (7 overs)		Andrew Umeed 55 (46); Paul van Meekeren 3/34 (7)

Gloucestershire won by 198 runs
County Ground, Bristol
Umpires: Hassan Adnan and Ian Blackwell

- Somerset won the toss and elected to field.
- Points: Gloucestershire 2, Somerset 0

13 August 2023
11:00
Scorecard

Sussex; 276/9 (50 overs)	v	Glamorgan; 278/6 (46.3 overs)
Fynn Hudson-Prentice 66 (54); Zain-ul-Hassan 4/25 (5 overs)		Colin Ingram 73 (75); Fynn Hudson-Prentice 2/45 (8.3 overs)

Glamorgan won by 4 wickets
County Cricket Ground, Hove
Umpires: Anna Harris and Nigel Llong

- Sussex won the toss and elected to bat.
- Points: Glamorgan 2, Sussex 0

13 August 2023
11:00
Scorecard

Worcestershire; 108 (30.2 overs)	v	Warwickshire; 111/1 (16.2 overs)
Matthew Waite 44 (60); Oliver Hannon-Dalby 5/31 (10 overs)		Ed Barnard 65* (44); Josh Baker 1/15 (2 overs)

Warwickshire won by 9 wickets
New Road, Worcester
Umpires: Naeem Ashraf and Rob White

- Warwickshire won the toss and elected to field.
- Points: Warwickshire 2, Worcestershire 0

15 August 2023
11:00
Scorecard

Derbyshire; 247/9 (50 overs)	v	Warwickshire; 248/6 (47.4 overs)
David Lloyd 65 (92); Oliver Hannon-Dalby 4/49 (9 overs)		Will Rhodes 75 (96); Luis Reece 4/43 (8.4 overs)

Warwickshire won by 4 wickets
Edgbaston, Birmingham
Umpires: Ben Peverall and James Tredwell

- Derbyshire won the toss and elected to bat.
- Tazeem Chaudri Ali (Warwickshire) made his List A debut.
- Points: Warwickshire 2, Derbyshire 0.

16 August 2023
11:00
Scorecard

Glamorgan; 217 (46 overs)	v	Gloucestershire; 218/5 (46.1 overs)
Eddie Byrom 60 (92); Zafar Gohar 2/36 (10 overs)		Ollie Price 109* (113); Ben Kellaway 3/47 (10 overs)

Gloucestershire won by 5 wickets
Sophia Gardens, Cardiff
Umpires: Mike Burns and Rob White

- Glamorgan won the toss and elected to bat.
- Points: Gloucestershire 2, Glamorgan 0.

16 August 2023
11:00
Scorecard

Northamptonshire; 252 (49 overs)	v	Worcestershire; 253/3 (43.1 overs)
Tom Taylor 100 (80); Dillon Pennington 3/47 (10 overs)		Rob Jones 122 (126); Tom Taylor 2/34 (7 overs)

Worcestershire won by 7 wickets
County Ground, Northampton
Umpires: Phil Mustard and Simon Widdup

- Worcestershire won the toss and elected to field.
- Points: Worcestershire 2, Northamptonshire 0.

17 August 2023
11:00
Scorecard

Durham; 181 (45 overs)	v	Somerset; 182/4 (27 overs)
Alex Lees 63 (89); Danny Lamb 3/25 (9 overs)		George Bartlett 55 (38); Liam Trevaskis 3/43 (9 overs)

Somerset won by 6 wickets
South Northumberland Cricket Club, Gosforth
Umpires: Hassan Adnan and Neil Mallender

- Somerset won the toss and elected to field.
- Finley Hill (Somerset) made his List A debut.
- Points: Somerset 2, Durham 0.

18 August 2023
11:00
Scorecard

Worcestershire; 254/5 (30 overs)	v	Derbyshire; 192 (25.1 overs)
Kashif Ali 88 (36); Sam Conners 2/45 (6 overs)		Luis Reece 96 (64); Pat Brown 4/51 (6 overs)

Worcestershire won by 62 runs
County Ground, Derby
Umpires: Rob Bailey and Jack Shantry

- Derbyshire won the toss and elected to field.
- The match was reduced to 30 overs per side due to rain.
- Harry Moore (Derbyshire) made his List A debut.
- Points: Worcestershire 2, Derbyshire 0.

18 August 2023
11:00
Scorecard

Gloucestershire; 311 (38 overs)	v	Sussex; 145 (25.1 overs)
Jack Taylor 106 (54); Henry Crocombe 4/63 (7 overs)		Cheteshwar Pujara 32 (40); Tom Smith 3/16 (4.1 overs)

Gloucestershire won by 166 runs
County Cricket Ground, Hove
Umpires: Sam Hollingshead and Mark Newell

- Sussex won the toss and elected to field.
- The match was reduced to 38 overs per side due to rain.
- Charlie Tear (Sussex) made his List A debut.
- Points: Gloucestershire 2, Sussex 0.

18 August 2023
11:00
Scorecard

Warwickshire; 104/3 (10 overs)	v	Northamptonshire; 80/6 (10 overs)
Ed Barnard 32 (14); Simon Kerrigan 2/14 (2 overs)		Tom Taylor 29 (14); Oliver Hannon-Dalby 2/10 (2 overs)

Warwickshire won by 24 runs
Edgbaston, Birmingham
Umpires: Richard Kettleborough and Graham Lloyd

- Northamptonshire won the toss and elected to field.
- The match was reduced to 10 overs per side due to rain.
- Points: Warwickshire 2, Northamptonshire 0.

20 August 2023
11:00
Scorecard

Northamptonshire; 201 (49.3 overs)	v	Derbyshire; 203/6 (49 overs)
Luke Procter 39 (69); Sam Conners 3/32 (10 overs)		Matt Lamb 63* (82); Rob Keogh 2/37 (8 overs)

Derbyshire won by 4 wickets
County Ground, Northampton
Umpires: Neil Mallender and Tom Lungley

- Derbyshire won the toss and elected to field.
- Points: Derbyshire 2, Northamptonshire 0.

20 August 2023
11:00
Scorecard

Somerset; 298/7 (50 overs)	v	Glamorgan; 301/8 (47.1 overs)
Andrew Umeed 116 (136); Ben Kellaway 3/49 (10 overs)		Eddie Byrom 108 (103); Andrew Umeed 3/31 (8 overs)

Glamorgan won by 2 wickets
County Ground, Taunton
Umpires: Ian Blackwell and Ben Peverall

- Somerset won the toss and elected to bat.
- Points: Glamorgan 2, Somerset 0.

20 August 2023
11:00
Scorecard

Durham; 338/8 (50 overs)	v	Warwickshire; 337/8 (50 overs)
David Bedingham 152 (108); Oliver Hannon-Dalby 3/54 (10 overs)		Ed Barnard 161 (152); Migael Pretorius 4/50 (10 overs)

Durham won by 1 run
Edgbaston, Birmingham
Umpires: Naeem Ashraf and Russell Warren

- Warwickshire won the toss and elected to field.
- Points: Durham 2, Warwickshire 0.

20 August 2023
11:00
Scorecard

Sussex; 190 (45.5 overs)	v	Worcestershire; 194/2 (26.4 overs)
Danial Ibrahim 51 (88); Josh Baker 3/35 (10 overs)		Azhar Ali 74 (76); Danial Ibrahim 1/19 (4 overs)

Worcestershire won by 8 wickets
New Road, Worcester
Umpires: Peter Hartley and David Millns

- Sussex won the toss and elected to bat.
- Jamie Atkins, Bertie Foreman and Zach Lion-Cachet (Sussex) all made their List A debut.
- Points: Worcestershire 2, Sussex 0.

22 August 2023
11:00
Scorecard

Somerset; 333/5 (50 overs)	v	Derbyshire; 261 (48.1 overs)
Andrew Umeed 172* (147); Luis Reece 3/62 (10 overs)		Anuj Dal 110 (109); Josh Davey 3/18 (6 overs)

Somerset won by 72 runs
County Ground, Derby
Umpires: Neil Mallender and Sue Redfern

- Derbyshire won the toss and elected to field.
- Points: Somerset 2, Derbyshire 0.

22 August 2023
11:00
Scorecard

Northamptonshire; 340/5 (50 overs)	v	Glamorgan; 343/5 (47.4 overs)
Ricardo Vasconcelos 106 (114); Andy Gorvin 2/56 (9 overs)		Sam Northeast 100 (105); Tom Taylor 2/75 (9 overs)

Glamorgan won by 5 wickets
Sophia Gardens, Cardiff
Umpires: Graham Lloyd and Naeem Ashraf

- Northamptonshire won the toss and elected to bat.
- Points: Glamorgan 2, Northamptonshire 0.

22 August 2023
11:00
Scorecard

Durham; 267 (49.3 overs)	v	Gloucestershire; 269/3 (36.3 overs)
David Bedingham 64 (71); Anwar Ali 3/38 (8 overs)		Ben Wells 108* (76); Migael Pretorius 1/34 (8 overs)

Gloucestershire won by 7 wickets
County Ground, Bristol
Umpires: Russell Warren and Surendiran Shanmugam

- Durham won the toss and elected to bat/
- Points: Gloucestershire 2, Durham 0.

22 August 2023
11:00
Scorecard

Sussex; 275/8 (50 overs)	v	Warwickshire; 279/9 (49 overs)
Tom Alsop 68 (87); Jake Lintott 2/62 (10 overs)		Ed Barnard 100 (106); Henry Crocombe 2/47 (8 overs)

Warwickshire won by 1 wicket
County Cricket Ground, Hove
Umpires: Anthony Harris and Ian Blackwell

- Warwickshire won the toss and elected to field.
- Points: Warwickshire 2, Sussex 0.

== Knockout stage ==
The winner of each group progressed straight to the semi-finals, with the second and third placed teams playing a play-off match against a team from the other group which made up the play-offs. The winner of each play-off will play one of the group winners in the semi-finals.

Quarter-finals
B2	Gloucestershire	181/2 (24.5 overs)
A3	Lancashire	177 (44.3 overs)
A2	Hampshire	306/9 (50 overs)
B3	Worcestershire	296/9 (50 overs)

Semi-finals
A1	Leicestershire	126/4 (28.3 overs)
QF1	Gloucestershire	125 (32.3 overs)
B1	Warwickshire	93 (25.5 overs)
QF2	Hampshire	95/1 (19.1 overs)

Final
SF1	Leicestershire	267/7 (50 overs)
SF2	Hampshire	265/8 (50 overs)

=== Quarter-finals ===
25 August 2023
11:00
Scorecard

Lancashire; 177 (44.3 overs)	v	Gloucestershire; 181/2 (24.5 overs)
Tom Aspinwall 47 (71); Ollie Price 2/12 (5 overs)		Miles Hammond 109* (85); George Bell 1/20 (3 overs)

Gloucestershire won by 8 wickets
County Ground, Bristol
Umpires: Hassan Adnan and Surendiran Shanmugam

- Lancashire won the toss and elected to bat.

27 August 2023
11:00
Scorecard

Hampshire; 306/9 (50 overs)	v	Worcestershire; 296/9 (50 overs)
Aneurin Donald 115 (73); Logan van Beek 2/62 (10 overs)		Jake Libby 70 (70); Brad Wheal 4/48 (7 overs)

Hampshire won by 10 runs
Rose Bowl, Southampton
Umpires: Neil Pratt and Nigel Llong

- Worcestershire won the toss and elected to field.

=== Semi-finals ===
29 August 2023
14:00 (D/N)
Scorecard

Gloucestershire; 125 (32.3 overs)	v	Leicestershire; 126/4 (28.3 overs)
Graeme van Buuren 44 (68); Tom Scriven 3/19 (5 overs)		Wiaan Mulder 55* (46); David Payne 2/35 (8 overs)

Leicestershire won by 6 wickets
Grace Road, Leicester
Umpires: Neil Mallender and Jack Shantry

- Leicestershire won the toss and elected to field.

29 August 2023
11:00
Scorecard

Warwickshire; 93 (25.5 overs)	v	Hampshire; 95/1 (19.1 overs)
Sam Hain 33* (48); Liam Dawson 7/15 (6.5 overs)		Fletcha Middleton 54* (65); Jake Lintott 1/43 (6.1 overs)

Hampshire won by 9 wickets
Edgbaston, Birmingham
Umpires: Tom Lungley and Steve O'Shaughnessy

- Hampshire won the toss and elected to field.

== Final ==
16 September 2023
11:00
Scorecard

Leicestershire; 267/7 (50 overs)	v	Hampshire; 265/8 (50 overs)
Harry Swindells 117* (96); Scott Currie 3/63 (10 overs)		Liam Dawson 57 (64); Wiaan Mulder 2/43 (10 overs)

Leicestershire won by 2 runs
Trent Bridge, Nottingham
Umpires: Graham Lloyd and James Middlebrook
Player of the match: Harry Swindells (Leicestershire)

- Leicestershire won the toss and elected to bat.

Leicestershire were reduced to 19 for 4, then 89 for 6, before a seventh-wicket partnership of 151 between Harry Swindells and Sam Evans. With three wickets in hand, Hampshire needed only eight runs to win from their final six balls, but these were defended by 19-year-old Josh Hull, who dismissed Liam Dawson in the process.
