= 2019 One-Day Cup =

Cricket tournament

2019 Royal London One-Day Cup
- Dates: 17 April – 25 May 2019
- Administrator: England and Wales Cricket Board
- Cricket format: Limited overs cricket (50 overs)
- Tournament format(s): Group stage and knockout
- Champions: Somerset (4th title)
- Participants: 18
- Matches: 77
- Most runs: Billy Godleman (521)
- Most wickets: Saqib Mahmood (28)
- Official website: ecb.co.uk

The 2019 Royal London One-Day Cup tournament was a limited overs cricket competition that formed part of the 2019 domestic cricket season in England and Wales. The tournament was won by Somerset, their first win in the tournament since 2001. Matches were contested over 50 overs per side and had List A cricket status. All eighteen first-class counties competed in the tournament, which due to the 2019 Cricket World Cup being hosted in England took place at the beginning of the English cricket season starting on 17 April 2019, with the final taking place just over a month later at Lord's on 25 May 2019. Hampshire were the defending champions.

== Format ==
Home grounds of each county

The competition featured two groups of nine teams, based on a rough North–South geographical split. Each team played eight matches during the group stage, playing every other member of their group once, with four matches at home and four away. The group stage took place from the middle of April to the end, taking place earlier than usual due to the 2019 Cricket World Cup taking place in England and Wales. The group winners progressed straight to the semi-finals and the second and third placed teams in each group played a play-off against a team from the other group with the winner progressing to one of the semi-final matches.

| North Group | South Group |
|---|---|
| Derbyshire | Essex |
| Durham | Glamorgan |
| Lancashire | Gloucestershire |
| Leicestershire | Hampshire |
| Northamptonshire | Kent |
| Nottinghamshire | Middlesex |
| Warwickshire | Somerset |
| Worcestershire | Surrey |
| Yorkshire | Sussex |

== North Group ==
=== Teams ===
| Team | Primary home ground | Other grounds | Coach | Captain | Overseas player(s) |
|---|---|---|---|---|---|
| Derbyshire | County Ground, Derby | — | (Zimbabwe) Dave Houghton | (England) Billy Godleman | (Netherlands) Logan van Beek |
| Durham | Riverside Ground, Chester-le-Street | Roseworth Terrace, Gosforth | (New Zealand) James Franklin | (Australia) Cameron Bancroft | (Australia) Cameron Bancroft |
| Lancashire | Old Trafford, Manchester | — | (England) Glen Chapple | (South Africa) Dane Vilas | (Australia) Glenn Maxwell (Australia) Jake Lehmann |
| Leicestershire | Grace Road, Leicester | — | (England) Paul Nixon | (England) Paul Horton | (Pakistan) Mohammad Abbas |
| Northamptonshire | County Ground, Northampton | — | (England) David Ripley | (England) Alex Wakely | (Cricket West Indies) Jason Holder |
| Nottinghamshire | Trent Bridge, Nottingham | Gorse Lane, Grantham | (England) Peter Moores | (England) Steven Mullaney | (Australia) James Pattinson |
| Warwickshire | Edgbaston, Birmingham | — | (England) Jim Troughton | (New Zealand) Jeetan Patel | (New Zealand) Jeetan Patel |
| Worcestershire | New Road, Worcester | — | (England) Alex Gidman | (England) Brett D'Oliveira | (New Zealand) Hamish Rutherford (Australia) Callum Ferguson |
| Yorkshire | Headingley, Leeds | — | (England) Andrew Gale | (England) Steven Patterson | — |

=== Table ===
| Pos | Team | Pld | W | L | T | NR | Ded | Pts | NRR |
|---|---|---|---|---|---|---|---|---|---|
| 1 | Nottinghamshire (Note: advanced directly to the semi-finals) | 8 | 6 | 1 | 0 | 1 | 0 | 13 | 0.619 |
| 2 | Worcestershire (Note: advanced to the quarter-finals) | 8 | 6 | 2 | 0 | 0 | 0 | 12 | 1.083 |
| 3 | Lancashire | 8 | 5 | 3 | 0 | 0 | 0 | 10 | 0.344 |
| 4 | Durham | 8 | 4 | 2 | 0 | 2 | 0 | 10 | 0.472 |
| 5 | Derbyshire | 8 | 3 | 4 | 1 | 0 | 0 | 7 | −0.070 |
| 6 | Yorkshire | 8 | 2 | 3 | 2 | 1 | 0 | 7 | −0.091 |
| 7 | Warwickshire | 8 | 2 | 5 | 1 | 0 | 0 | 5 | −0.911 |
| 8 | Northamptonshire | 8 | 2 | 6 | 0 | 0 | 0 | 4 | 0.069 |
| 9 | Leicestershire | 8 | 2 | 6 | 0 | 0 | 0 | 4 | −1.313 |

Source: BBC Sport, CricInfo

=== Results ===
==== April ====
17 April 2019
11:00 BST
Scorecard

| Durham (H); 342/5 (50 overs) | v | Northamptonshire; 270 (43.5 overs) |
| Cameron Bancroft 151* (130); Jason Holder 2/72 (10 overs) | | Jason Holder 86 (68); Matthew Potts 4/62 (10 overs maximum) |

Durham won by 72 runs
Riverside Ground, Chester-le-Street
Umpires: Michael Gough and Neil Mallender

- Northamptonshire won the toss and elected to field.
- Scott Steel, Brydon Carse and Liam Trevaskis (Durham) all made their List A debuts.
- Points: Durham 2, Northamptonshire 0.

17 April 2019
11:00 BST
Scorecard

| Worcestershire; 367 (49.1 overs) | v | Lancashire (H); 242 (40.4 overs) |
| Hamish Rutherford 108 (95); Matt Parkinson 5/51 (10 overs) | | Keaton Jennings 54 (60); Josh Tongue 2/35 (6.4 overs) |

Worcestershire won by 125 runs
Old Trafford Cricket Ground, Old Trafford, Manchester
Umpires: Peter Hartley and Nick Cook

- Worcestershire won the toss and elected to bat.
- Brooke Guest (Lancashire) made his List A debut.
- Points: Worcestershire 2, Lancashire 0.

17 April 2019
11:00 BST
Scorecard

| Yorkshire (H); 379/7 (50 overs) | v | Leicestershire; 166 (29.3 overs) |
| Gary Ballance 156 (133); Tom Taylor 3/57 (10 overs) | | Mark Cosgrove 42 (33); Mathew Pillans 5/29 (6.3 overs) |

Yorkshire won by 213 runs
Headingley Cricket Ground, Headingley, Leeds
Umpires: Graham Lloyd and Paul Pollard

- Leicestershire won the toss and elected to field.
- Points: Yorkshire 2, Leicestershire 0.

19 April 2019
11:00 BST
Scorecard

| Derbyshire (H); 268/6 (50 overs) | v | Northamptonshire; 215 (43.5 overs) |
| Billy Godleman 87 (124); Blessing Muzarabani 2/54 (9 overs) | | Luke Procter 50* (64); Alex Hughes 4/44 (7.5 overs) |

Derbyshire won by 53 runs
County Ground, Derby
Umpires: James Middlebrook and Nick Cook

- Derbyshire won the toss and elected to bat.
- Tom Lace (Derbyshire) made his List A debut.
- Points: Derbyshire 2, Northamptonshire 0.

19 April 2019
11:00 BST
Scorecard

| Leicestershire; 233/9 (50 overs) | v | Durham (H); 234/4 (45.3 overs) |
| Tom Taylor 59 (63); Matthew Potts 3/45 (10 overs) | | Cameron Bancroft 118* (117); Gavin Griffiths 2/44 (9 overs) |

Durham won by 6 wickets
Riverside Ground, Chester-le-Street
Umpires: Tim Robinson and Michael Gough

- Leicestershire won the toss and elected to bat.
- Points: Durham 2, Leicestershire 0.

19 April 2019
11:00 BST
Scorecard

| Nottinghamshire (H); 417/7 (50 overs) | v | Lancashire; 406/9 (50 overs) |
| Joe Clarke 139 (99); Graham Onions 2/70 (10 overs) | | Dane Vilas 166 (100); James Pattinson 5/61 (10 overs) |

Nottinghamshire won by 11 runs
Trent Bridge, West Bridgford, Nottingham
Umpires: Graham Lloyd and Peter Hartley

- Nottinghamshire won the toss and elected to bat.
- Jake Libby (Nottinghamshire) made his List A debut.
- Points: Nottinghamshire 2, Lancashire 0.

19 April 2019
11:00 BST
Scorecard

| Warwickshire (H); 270/8 (50 overs) | v | Yorkshire; 270/9 (50 overs) |
| Tim Ambrose 77 (108); Mathew Pillans 3/56 (8 overs) | | Tim Bresnan 89 (88); Chris Woakes 3/47 (10 overs) |

Match tied
Edgbaston Cricket Ground, Edgbaston, Birmingham
Umpires: Neil Bainton and Ian Blackwell

- Yorkshire won the toss and elected to field.
- Liam Banks (Warwickshire) made his List A debut.
- Points: Warwickshire 1, Yorkshire 1.

21 April 2019
11:00 BST
Scorecard

| Derbyshire (H); 297/8 (50 overs) | v | Nottinghamshire; 299/4 (45.1 overs) |
| Billy Godleman 116 (148); Luke Fletcher 5/56 (10 overs) | | Ben Slater 83 (100); Alfie Gleadall 3/43 (7 overs) |

Nottinghamshire won by 6 wickets
County Ground, Derby
Umpires: Richard Kettleborough and Paul Baldwin

- Derbyshire won the toss and elected to bat.
- Points: Nottinghamshire 2, Derbyshire 0.

21 April 2019
11:00 BST
Scorecard

| Leicestershire (H); 377/4 (50 overs) | v | Worcestershire; 339 (46.2 overs) |
| Colin Ackermann 152* (143); Josh Tongue 2/79 (10 overs) | | Ross Whiteley 131 (83); Dieter Klein 4/72 (8.2 overs) |

Leicestershire won by 38 runs
Grace Road, Leicester
Umpires: David Millns and Nick Cook

- Leicestershire won the toss and elected to bat.
- Points: Leicestershire 2, Worcestershire 0.

21 April 2019
11:00 BST
Scorecard

| Northamptonshire (H); 358/6 (50 overs) | v | Warwickshire; 164 (34.4 overs) |
| Rob Keogh 69 (87); Henry Brookes 3/80 (10 overs) | | Ed Pollock 36 (27); Jason Holder 3/26 (7 overs) |

Northamptonshire won by 194 runs
County Ground, Abington, Northampton
Umpires: Graham Lloyd and James Middlebrook

- Warwickshire won the toss and elected to field.
- Points: Northamptonshire 2, Warwickshire 0.

21 April 2019
11:00 BST
Scorecard

| Lancashire; 311/6 (50 overs) | v | Yorkshire (H); 310 (50 overs) |
| Steven Croft 97 (117); David Willey 2/51 (10 overs) | | Tom Kohler-Cadmore 97 (113); Saqib Mahmood 3/76 (10 overs) |

Lancashire won by 1 run
Headingley Cricket Ground, Headingley, Leeds
Umpires: Tim Robinson and Michael Gough

- Lancashire won the toss and elected to bat.
- Points: Lancashire 2, Yorkshire 0.

23 April 2019
11:00 BST
Scorecard

| Nottinghamshire; 301/9 (50 overs) | v | Warwickshire (H); 183 (37.5 overs) |
| Ben Slater 100 (115); Jeetan Patel 5/45 (10 overs) | | Liam Banks 57 (60); Luke Fletcher 3/21 (6.5 overs) |

Nottinghamshire won by 118 runs
Edgbaston Cricket Ground, Edgbaston, Birmingham
Umpires: Richard Kettleborough and Russell Warren

- Nottinghamshire won the toss and elected to bat.
- Points: Nottinghamshire 2, Warwickshire 0.

24 April 2019
11:00 BST
Scorecard

| Northamptonshire; 269 (50 overs) | v | Lancashire (H); 164/2 (28.4 overs) |
| Jason Holder 72 (58); Saqib Mahmood 6/37 (10 overs) | | Haseeb Hameed 65 (80); Luke Procter 1/31 (4.4 overs) |

Lancashire won by 45 runs (D/L method)
Old Trafford Cricket Ground, Old Trafford, Manchester
Umpires: Rob Bailey and Paul Baldwin

- Lancashire won the toss and elected to field.
- Lancashire were set a revised target of 120 from 28.4 overs due to rain.
- Points: Lancashire 2, Northamptonshire 0.

24 April 2019
11:00 BST
Scorecard

| Leicestershire (H); 312/8 (50 overs) | v | Derbyshire; 266/3 (39 overs) |
| Colin Ackermann 119 (112); Alex Hughes 2/55 (9 overs) | | Billy Godleman 106 (115); Colin Ackermann 1/42 (8 overs) |

Derbyshire won by 7 wickets (D/L method)
Grace Road, Leicester
Umpires: Peter Hartley and Michael Gough

- Derbyshire won the toss and elected to field.
- Derbyshire were set a revised target of 266 from 39 overs due to rain.
- Sam Conners (Derbyshire) made his List A debut.
- Points: Derbyshire 2, Leicestershire 0.

24 April 2019
11:00 BST
Scorecard

| Durham; 114/4 (27.2 overs) | v | Worcestershire (H); 152/6 (22.2 overs) |
| Alex Lees 52* (77); Brett D'Oliveira 1/16 (4 overs) | | Hamish Rutherford 33 (22); Brydon Carse 2/16 (5 overs) |

Worcestershire won by 4 wickets (D/L method)
New Road, Worcester
Umpires: Tom Lungley and Alex Wharf

- Worcestershire won the toss and elected to field.
- Worcestershire were set a revised target of 152 from 24 overs due to rain.
- Points: Worcestershire 2, Durham 0.

26 April 2019
11:00 BST
Scorecard

| Worcestershire; 254/9 (50 overs) | v | Northamptonshire (H); 234 (48.4 overs) |
| Hamish Rutherford 126 (135); Ben Sanderson 2/23 (7 overs) | | Alex Wakely 46 (58); Wayne Parnell 3/45 (7.4 overs) |

Worcestershire won by 20 runs
County Ground, Abington, Northampton
Umpires: Richard Kettleborough and Michael Gough

- Northamptonshire won the toss and elected to field.
- Ben Curran (Northamptonshire) made his List A debut.
- Points: Worcestershire 2, Northamptonshire 0.

26 April 2019
11:00 BST
Scorecard

| Nottinghamshire (H); 433/7 (50 overs) | v | Leicestershire; 259 (33.2 overs) |
| Ben Duckett 86 (61); Gavin Griffiths 3/92 (10 overs) | | Harry Dearden 74 (70); Luke Fletcher 3/53 (8 overs) |

Nottinghamshire won by 87 runs (D/L method)
Trent Bridge, West Bridgford, Nottingham
Umpires: Tom Lungley and Martin Saggers

- Leicestershire won the toss and elected to field.
- Leicestershire were set a revised target of 347 from 37 overs due to rain.
- Points: Nottinghamshire 2, Leicestershire 0.

26 April 2019
11:00 BST
Scorecard

| Warwickshire (H); 244/8 (50 overs) | v | Durham; 211/3 (33.4 overs) |
| Tim Ambrose 62 (89); Brydon Carse 3/52 (9 overs) | | Alex Lees 78* (69); Alex Thomson 1/31 (5 overs) |

Durham won by 7 wickets (D/L method)
Edgbaston Cricket Ground, Edgbaston, Birmingham
Umpires: Billy Taylor and Russell Warren

- Durham won the toss and elected to field.
- Durham were set a revised target of 211 from 36 overs due to rain.
- Points: Durham 2, Warwickshire 0.

26 April 2019
11:00 BST
Scorecard

| Yorkshire (H); 308/2 (40 overs) | v | Derbyshire; 224/3 (22 overs) |
| Tom Kohler-Cadmore 79 (92); Ravi Rampaul 1/44 (8 overs) | | Billy Godleman 107* (62); Adam Lyth 2/27 (3 overs) |

Match tied (D/L method)
Headingley Cricket Ground, Headingley, Leeds
Umpires: Rob Bailey and Paul Baldwin

- Yorkshire won the toss and elected to bat.
- Derbyshire were set a revised target of 225 from 22 overs due to rain.
- Anuj Dal (Derbyshire) made his List A debut.
- Points: Yorkshire 1, Derbyshire 1.

28 April 2019
11:00 BST
Scorecard

| Derbyshire; 255/8 (50 overs) | v | Durham (H); 260/7 (46.4 overs) |
| Matthew Critchley 49* (36); Ben Raine 2/40 (10 overs) | | Michael Richardson 72* (71); Tom Lace 2/20 (2 overs) |

Durham won by 3 wickets
Riverside Ground, Chester-le-Street
Umpires: Peter Hartley and David Millns

- Durham won the toss and elected to field.
- Points: Durham 2, Derbyshire 0.

28 April 2019
11:00 BST
Scorecard

| Leicestershire; 80 (37 overs) | v | Lancashire (H); 83/1 (19 overs) |
| Harry Dearden 20 (32); Saqib Mahmood 5/14 (10 overs) | | Steven Croft 37* (36); Dieter Klein 1/19 (7 overs) |

Lancashire won by 9 wickets
Old Trafford Cricket Ground, Old Trafford, Manchester
Umpires: Nick Cook and Paul Baldwin

- Lancashire won the toss and elected to field.
- Points: Lancashire 2, Leicestershire 0.

28 April 2019
11:00 BST
Scorecard

| Yorkshire; 213 (42.2 overs) | v | Nottinghamshire (H); 214/6 (34.3 overs) |
| Adam Lyth 63 (54); Jake Ball 3/32 (6 overs) | | Steven Mullaney 54* (58); Mathew Pillans 3/57 (8 overs) |

Nottinghamshire won by 4 wickets
Trent Bridge, West Bridgford, Nottingham
Umpires: Billy Taylor and Rob Bailey

- Yorkshire won the toss and elected to bat.
- Points: Nottinghamshire 2, Yorkshire 0.

28 April 2019
11:00 BST
Scorecard

| Warwickshire; 315/5 (50 overs) | v | Worcestershire (H); 281 (47.2 overs) |
| Sam Hain 161* (141); Charlie Morris 2/57 (10 overs) | | Wayne Parnell 76 (57); Jeetan Patel 4/37 (10 overs) |

Warwickshire won by 34 runs
New Road, Worcester
Umpires: Michael Gough and Steve O'Shaughnessyy
Player of the match: Sam Hain (Warwickshire)

- Warwickshire won the toss and elected to bat.
- Points: Warwickshire 2, Worcestershire 0.

30 April 2019
11:00 BST
Scorecard

| Warwickshire; 288/7 (50 overs) | v | Derbyshire (H); 289/5 (46.3 overs) |
| Alex Thomson 68* (78); Logan van Beek 3/69 (10 overs) | | Wayne Madsen 119* (104); Alex Thomson 3/57 (10 overs) |

Derbyshire won by 5 wickets
County Ground, Derby
Umpires: Paul Pollard and Michael Gough

- Derbyshire won the toss and elected to field.
- Points: Derbyshire 2, Warwickshire 0.

30 April 2019
11:00 BST
Scorecard

| Durham (H); 229 (48.2 overs) | v | Lancashire; 230/7 (49.2 overs) |
| Alex Lees 115 (127); Glenn Maxwell 3/42 (10 overs) | | Steven Croft 99 (122); Ben Raine 2/34 (9.2 overs) |

Lancashire won by 3 wickets
Roseworth Terrace, Gosforth, Newcastle upon Tyne
Umpires: Neil Mallender and David Millns

- Lancashire won the toss and elected to field.
- Points: Lancashire 2, Durham 0.

==== May ====
1 May 2019
11:00 BST
Scorecard

| Nottinghamshire; 121 (32 overs) | v | Worcestershire (H); 124/5 (25.1 overs) |
| Chris Nash 51 (67); Wayne Parnell 5/24 (9 overs) | | Tom Fell 48* (64); Luke Wood 2/36 (5 overs) |

Worcestershire won by 5 wickets
New Road, Worcester
Umpires: Mike Burns and Ian Blackwell

- Nottinghamshire won the toss and elected to bat.
- Lyndon James (Nottinghamshire) made his List A debut.
- Points: Worcestershire 2, Nottinghamshire 0.

1 May 2019
13:00 BST (D/N)
Scorecard

| Northamptonshire (H); 351 (49.3 overs) | v | Yorkshire; 175/5 (24.4 overs) |
| Ricardo Vasconcelos 112 (97); Mathew Pillans 3/65 (9.3 overs) | | Tom Kohler-Cadmore 67 (80); Ian Holland 2/38 (4.4 overs) |

Yorkshire won by 5 wickets (D/L method)
County Ground, Abington, Northampton
Umpires: Martin Saggers and Jeff Evans
Player of the match: Ricardo Vasconcelos (Northamptonshire)

- Northamptonshire won the toss and elected to bat.
- Yorkshire were set a revised target of 175 from 25 overs due to rain.
- Points: Yorkshire 2, Northamptonshire 0.

2 May 2019
11:00 BST
Scorecard

| Lancashire (H); 239/6 (38 overs) | v | Derbyshire; 209/7 (38 overs) |
| Keaton Jennings 84 (88); Mark Watt 2/50 (8 overs) | | Anuj Dal 52 (39); Steven Croft 2/20 (7 overs) |

Lancashire won by 30 runs
Old Trafford Cricket Ground, Old Trafford, Manchester
Umpires: Paul Pollard and Tim Robinson

- Derbyshire won the toss and elected to field.
- The match was reduced to 38 overs per side due to rain.
- Points: Lancashire 2, Derbyshire 0.

3 May 2019
11:00 BST
Scorecard

| Durham | v | Nottinghamshire (H) |

No result
Gorse Lane, Grantham
Umpires: Peter Hartley and Neil Bainton

- Nottinghamshire won the toss and elected to field.
- No play was possible due to rain.
- Points: Nottinghamshire 1, Durham 1.

4 May 2019
11:00 BST
Scorecard

| Northamptonshire; 290/6 (50 overs) | v | Leicestershire (H); 261/9 (50 overs) |
| Rob Keogh 102 (85); Mohammad Abbas 2/55 (10 overs) | | Ben Mike 41 (29); Nathan Buck 3/44 (10 overs) |

Northamptonshire won by 29 runs
Grace Road, Leicester
Umpires: Richard Kettleborough and Ben Debenham

- Northamptonshire won the toss and elected to bat.
- Points: Northamptonshire 2, Leicestershire 0.

4 May 2019
11:00 BST
Scorecard

| Lancashire; 277/7 (50 overs) | v | Warwickshire (H); 256/5 (44.3 overs) |
| Dane Vilas 83 (79); Alex Thomson 3/27 (10 overs) | | Sam Hain 84* (100); James Anderson 3/21 (9 overs) |

Warwickshire won by 5 wickets (D/L method)
Edgbaston Cricket Ground, Edgbaston, Birmingham
Umpires: Graham Lloyd and Paul Pollard

- Warwickshire won the toss and elected to field.
- Warwickshire were set a revised target of 255 from 45 overs due to rain.
- Points: Warwickshire 2, Lancashire 0.

4 May 2019
11:00 BST
Scorecard

| Worcestershire (H); 293/7 (50 overs) | v | Yorkshire; 143 (33 overs) |
| George Rhodes 106 (111); Steven Patterson 4/45 (9 overs) | | Mathew Pillans 31 (31); Wayne Parnell 5/25 (7 overs) |

Worcestershire won by 150 runs
New Road, Worcester
Umpires: Mike Burns and Paul Baldwin

- Worcestershire won the toss and elected to bat.
- Points: Worcestershire 2, Yorkshire 0.

6 May 2019
11:00 BST
Scorecard

| Derbyshire (H); 351/9 (50 overs) | v | Worcestershire; 353/6 (48.2 overs) |
| Luis Reece 128 (108); Wayne Parnell 2/75 (10 overs) | | Riki Wessels 130 (62); Matthew Critchley 3/73 (10 overs) |

Worcestershire won by 4 wickets
County Ground, Derby
Umpires: Graham Lloyd and Peter Hartley
Player of the match: Riki Wessels (Worcestershire)

- Derbyshire won the toss and elected to bat.
- Points: Worcestershire 2, Derbyshire 0.

6 May 2019
11:00 BST
Scorecard

| Leicestershire (H); 340 (49.3 overs) | v | Warwickshire; 304 (47.1 overs) |
| Tom Taylor 98* (56); Oliver Hannon-Dalby 3/81 (10 overs) | | Robert Yates 66 (74); Tom Taylor 3/58 (8.1 overs) |

Leicestershire won by 36 runs
Grace Road, Leicester
Umpires: Neil Mallender and Ian Ramage

- Leicestershire won the toss and elected to bat.
- Robert Yates (Warwickshire) made his List A debut.
- Points: Leicestershire 2, Warwickshire 0.

6 May 2019
11:00 BST
Scorecard

| Northamptonshire (H); 325/7 (50 overs) | v | Nottinghamshire; 328/9 (49.3 overs) |
| Ricardo Vasconcelos 74 (78); Samit Patel 2/51 (10 overs) | | Samit Patel 136* (124); Nathan Buck 3/60 (10 overs) |

Nottinghamshire won by 1 wicket
County Ground, Abington, Northampton
Umpires: Ben Debenham and Jeremy Lloyds

- Northamptonshire won the toss and elected to bat.
- Points: Nottinghamshire 2, Northamptonshire 0.

6 May 2019
11:00 BST
Scorecard

| Durham; 182/2 (34.2 overs) | v | Yorkshire (H) |
| Scott Steel 68 (87); Tim Bresnan 2/36 (10 overs) |

No result
Headingley Cricket Ground, Headingley, Leeds
Umpires: David Millns and Paul Baldwin

- Yorkshire won the toss and elected to field.
- Rain during Durham's innings prevented any further play.
- Tom Loten, Jordan Thompson, Ben Birkhead and Jared Warner (Yorkshire) all made their List A debuts.
- Points: Yorkshire 1, Durham 1.

== South Group ==
=== Teams ===
| Team | Primary home ground | Other grounds | Coach | Captain | Overseas player(s) |
|---|---|---|---|---|---|
| Essex | County Ground, Chelmsford | — | (England) Anthony McGrath | (Netherlands) Ryan ten Doeschate | (Australia) Peter Siddle |
| Glamorgan | Sophia Gardens, Cardiff | — | (England) Matthew Maynard | (South Africa) Chris Cooke | (Australia) Marnus Labuschagne |
| Gloucestershire | County Ground, Bristol | — | (England) Richard Dawson | (England) Chris Dent | (Australia) Daniel Worrall |
| Hampshire | Rose Bowl, Southampton | — | (South Africa) Adrian Birrell | (England) James Vince | (South Africa) Aiden Markram |
| Kent | St Lawrence Ground, Canterbury | County Ground, Beckenham | (England) Matt Walker | (England) Sam Billings | (Australia) Matt Renshaw |
| Middlesex | Lord's, London | Brunton Memorial Ground, Radlett | (Australia) Stuart Law | (England) Dawid Malan | (New Zealand) Ross Taylor |
| Somerset | County Ground, Taunton | — | (England) Jason Kerr | (England) Tom Abell | (Pakistan) Azhar Ali |
| Surrey | The Oval, London | — | (Australia) Michael Di Venuto | (England) Rory Burns | (South Africa) Dean Elgar |
| Sussex | County Ground, Hove | The Saffrons, Eastbourne | (Australia) Jason Gillespie | (England) Ben Brown | (Pakistan) Mir Hamza |

=== Table ===
| Pos | Team | Pld | W | L | T | NR | Ded | Pts | NRR |
|---|---|---|---|---|---|---|---|---|---|
| 1 | Hampshire (Note: advanced directly to the semi-finals) | 8 | 7 | 1 | 0 | 0 | 0 | 14 | 1.020 |
| 2 | Middlesex (Note: advanced to the quarter-finals) | 8 | 6 | 2 | 0 | 0 | 0 | 12 | 0.135 |
| 3 | Somerset | 8 | 5 | 3 | 0 | 0 | 0 | 10 | 0.505 |
| 4 | Gloucestershire | 8 | 5 | 3 | 0 | 0 | 0 | 10 | 0.270 |
| 5 | Sussex | 8 | 4 | 4 | 0 | 0 | 0 | 8 | 0.013 |
| 6 | Glamorgan | 8 | 3 | 4 | 0 | 1 | 0 | 7 | −0.298 |
| 7 | Kent | 8 | 2 | 5 | 0 | 1 | 0 | 5 | −0.966 |
| 8 | Essex | 8 | 2 | 6 | 0 | 0 | 0 | 4 | 0.325 |
| 9 | Surrey | 8 | 1 | 7 | 0 | 0 | 0 | 2 | −1.007 |

Source: BBC Sport, CricInfo

=== Results ===
==== April ====
17 April 2019
11:00 BST
Scorecard

| Essex; 326/7 (50 overs) | v | Glamorgan (H); 146 (31 overs) |
| Varun Chopra 111 (133); Graham Wagg 2/49 (10 overs maximum) | | Marchant de Lange 36 (22); Ravi Bopara 3/26 (7 overs) |

Essex won by 180 runs
Sophia Gardens, Cardiff
Umpires: Jeremy Lloyds and Steve O'Shaughnessy

- Glamorgan won the toss and elected to field.
- Points: Essex 2, Glamorgan 0.

17 April 2019
11:00 BST
Scorecard

| Gloucestershire (H); 235 (47.5 overs) | v | Surrey; 88 (24 overs) |
| Chris Dent 75 (86); Rikki Clarke 4/43 (10 overs) | | Jason Roy 19 (26); Tom Smith 3/7 (2 overs) |

Gloucestershire won by 147 runs
County Ground, Bristol
Umpires: Alex Wharf and Ian Blackwell

- Gloucestershire won the toss and elected to bat.
- Points: Gloucestershire 2, Surrey 0.

17 April 2019
13:00 BST (D/N)
Scorecard

| Hampshire; 310/9 (50 overs) | v | Kent (H); 220 (40 overs) |
| Sam Northeast 105* (95); Matt Milnes 5/79 (10 overs) | | Zak Crawley 49 (51); Liam Dawson 2/30 (9 overs) |

Hampshire won by 90 runs
St Lawrence Ground, Canterbury
Umpires: Neil Bainton and David Millns
Player of the match: Sam Northeast (Hampshire)

- Kent won the toss and elected to field.
- Matt Milnes (Kent) made his List A debut.
- Points: Hampshire 2, Kent 0.

19 April 2019
11:00 BST
Scorecard

| Middlesex; 366/8 (50 overs) | v | Essex (H); 328 (49.2 overs) |
| Dawid Malan 95 (102); Peter Siddle 3/71 (10 overs) | | Varun Chopra 127 (127); Nathan Sowter 6/62 (9.2 overs) |

Middlesex won by 38 runs
County Ground, Chelmsford
Umpires: Ben Debenham and David Millns

- Essex won the toss and elected to field.
- Points: Middlesex 2, Essex 0.

19 April 2019
11:00 BST
Scorecard

| Glamorgan; 292/9 (50 overs) | v | Hampshire (H); 293/3 (41.5 overs) |
| David Lloyd 68 (62); Kyle Abbott 3/47 (10 overs) | | Tom Alsop 130* (115); Graham Wagg 1/23 (3 overs) |

Hampshire won by 7 wickets
Rose Bowl, Southampton
Umpires: Mark Newell and Steve O'Shaughnessy

- Glamorgan won the toss and elected to bat.
- Points: Hampshire 2, Glamorgan 0.

19 April 2019
11:00 BST
Scorecard

| Somerset (H); 358/9 (50 overs) | v | Kent; 94 (27 overs) |
| Tom Banton 107 (79); Darren Stevens 2/50 (10 overs) | | Alex Blake 24 (33); Craig Overton 5/18 (7 overs) |

Somerset won by 264 runs
County Ground, Taunton
Umpires: Billy Taylor and Alex Wharf

- Kent won the toss and elected to field.
- Points: Somerset 2, Kent 0.

19 April 2019
13:00 BST (D/N)
Scorecard

| Surrey; 274/9 (50 overs) | v | Sussex (H); 278/8 (48.1 overs) |
| Ben Foakes 64 (67); Mir Hamza 4/43 (9 overs) | | David Wiese 92* (81); Tom Curran 3/37 (10 overs) |

Sussex won by 2 wickets
County Ground, Hove
Umpires: Martin Saggers and Jeff Evans
Player of the match: David Wiese (Sussex)

- Surrey won the toss and elected to bat.
- Points: Sussex 2, Surrey 0.

21 April 2019
11:00 BST
Scorecard

| Somerset; 261/9 (50 overs) | v | Glamorgan (H); 259 (48.1 overs) |
| James Hildreth 67 (76); Marchant de Lange 3/37 (10 overs) | | David Lloyd 84 (93); Josh Davey 4/36 (10 overs) |

Somerset won by 2 runs
Sophia Gardens, Cardiff
Umpires: Paul Pollard and Alex Wharf

- Somerset won the toss and elected to bat.
- Points: Somerset 2, Glamorgan 0.

21 April 2019
11:00 BST
Scorecard

| Kent (H); 298 (49.4 overs) | v | Sussex; 302/3 (40 overs) |
| Matt Renshaw 109 (111); George Garton 3/42 (8 overs) | | Phil Salt 137* (106); Matt Milnes 2/73 (9 overs) |

Sussex won by 7 wickets
County Ground, Beckenham
Umpires: Ben Debenham and Rob Bailey

- Kent won the toss and elected to bat.
- Points: Sussex 2, Kent 0.

21 April 2019
11:00 BST
Scorecard

| Gloucestershire; 283/7 (50 overs) | v | Middlesex (H); 287/4 (42.2 overs) |
| James Bracey 83 (61); Tim Murtagh 2/40 (10 overs) | | Stephen Eskinazi 107* (97); Daniel Worrall 2/30 (6 overs) |

Middlesex won by 6 wickets
Lord's, London
Umpires: Jeremy Lloyds and Steve O'Shaughnessy

- Middlesex won the toss and elected to field.
- James Bracey (Gloucestershire) made his List A debut.
- Points: Middlesex 2, Gloucestershire 0.

23 April 2019
11:00 BST
Scorecard

| Kent; 282/8 (50 overs) | v | Gloucestershire (H); 283/4 (46.5 overs) |
| Zak Crawley 85 (109); Benny Howell 2/39 (10 overs) | | Gareth Roderick 100* (80); Alex Blake 1/32 (6 overs) |

Gloucestershire won by 6 wickets
County Ground, Bristol
Umpires: Graham Lloyd and Ian Blackwell

- Gloucestershire won the toss and elected to field.
- Points: Gloucestershire 2, Kent 0.

23 April 2019
11:00 BST
Scorecard

| Hampshire (H); 301/9 (50 overs) | v | Middlesex; 182 (35.4 overs) |
| Aiden Markram 88 (90); Tom Helm 5/71 (9 overs) | | Eoin Morgan 41 (57); Kyle Abbott 3/36 (5 overs) |

Hampshire won by 119 runs
Rose Bowl, Southampton
Umpires: Billy Taylor and Jeremy Lloyds

- Middlesex won the toss and elected to field.
- Points: Hampshire 2, Middlesex 0.

23 April 2019
11:00 BST
Scorecard

| Surrey (H); 278/8 (50 overs) | v | Essex; 213 (42.5 overs) |
| Ben Foakes 82 (88); Sam Cook 3/37 (8 overs) | | Daniel Lawrence 50 (59); Morné Morkel 4/23 (8 overs) |

Surrey won by 65 runs
The Oval, London
Umpires: Ben Debenham and Mike Burns

- Essex won the toss and elected to field.
- Conor McKerr (Surrey) made his List A debut.
- Points: Surrey 2, Essex 0.

24 April 2019
11:00 BST
Scorecard

| Somerset; 283/8 (50 overs) | v | Sussex (H); 62/4 (16.3 overs) |
| James Hildreth 81 (92); Mir Hamza 3/54 (10 overs) | | Laurie Evans 25 (34); Tim Groenewald 1/7 (2.3 overs) |

Somerset won by 68 runs (D/L method)
County Ground, Hove
Umpires: Tim Robinson and Chris Watts

- Sussex won the toss and elected to field.
- Sussex were set a revised target of 131 from 16.3 overs due to rain.
- George Bartlett (Somerset) made his List A debut.
- Points: Somerset 2, Sussex 0.

25 April 2019
11:00 BST
Scorecard

| Glamorgan (H); 68/2 (15 overs) | v | Kent |
| Chris Cooke 29 (28); Fred Klaassen 1/9 (2 overs) |

No result
Sophia Gardens, Cardiff
Umpires: Paul Pollard and Mike Burns

- Glamorgan won the toss and elected to bat.
- Rain during Glamorgan's innings prevented any further play.
- Jeremy Lawlor (Glamorgan) made his List A debut.
- Points: Glamorgan 1, Kent 1.

25 April 2019
11:00 BST
Scorecard

| Middlesex; 277 (49.2 overs) | v | Surrey (H); 240 (48 overs) |
| Ross Taylor 64 (78); Gareth Batty 4/29 (10 overs) | | Ben Foakes 71 (80); Nathan Sowter 4/37 (10 overs) |

Middlesex won by 37 runs
The Oval, London
Umpires: Neil Mallender and Mark Newell

- Middlesex won the toss and elected to bat.
- Jamie Smith (Surrey) made his List A debut.
- Points: Middlesex 2, Surrey 0.

26 April 2019
11:00 BST
Scorecard

| Hampshire (H); 331/8 (50 overs) | v | Gloucestershire; 246 (43.5 overs) |
| James Vince 190 (154); Chris Liddle 4/66 (10 overs) | | Ryan Higgins 45 (45); Mason Crane 3/64 (10 overs) |

Hampshire won by 71 runs (D/L method)
Rose Bowl, Southampton
Umpires: Tim Robinson and Chris Watts

- Gloucestershire won the toss and elected to field.
- Gloucestershire were set a revised target of 318 from 47 overs due to rain.
- Points: Hampshire 2, Gloucestershire 0.

26 April 2019
13:00 BST (D/N)
Scorecard

| Somerset (H); 353/5 (39 overs) | v | Essex; 154/6 (17 overs) |
| Peter Trego 141 (101); Peter Siddle 4/60 (8 overs) | | Daniel Lawrence 51 (32); Tim Groenewald 3/34 (3 overs) |

Somerset won by 36 runs (D/L method)
County Ground, Taunton
Umpires: Jeff Evans and Jeremy Lloyds
Player of the match: Peter Trego (Somerset)

- Essex won the toss and elected to field.
- Essex were set a revised target of 191 from 17 overs due to rain.
- Points: Somerset 2, Essex 0.

27 April 2019
11:00 BST
Scorecard

| Sussex; 298 (48 overs) | v | Middlesex (H); 176 (33.3 overs) |
| Luke Wright 166 (142); Nathan Sowter 4/48 (10 overs) | | Stephen Eskinazi 42 (40); Mir Hamza 3/43 (7.3 overs) |

Sussex won by 122 runs
Lord's, London
Umpires: Neil Mallender and Mike Burns
Player of the match: Luke Wright (Sussex)

- Middlesex won the toss and elected to field.
- The match was reduced to 48 overs per side due to rain.
- Points: Sussex 2, Middlesex 0.

28 April 2019
11:00 BST
Scorecard

| Essex (H); 341/6 (50 overs) | v | Hampshire; 230 (40.5 overs) |
| Ryan ten Doeschate 89 (59); Liam Dawson 2/39 (10 overs) | | Rilee Rossouw 93 (72); Matt Coles 4/48 (6.5 overs) |

Essex won by 111 runs
County Ground, Chelmsford
Umpires: Richard Kettleborough and Paul Pollard

- Essex won the toss and elected to bat.
- Rishi Patel (Essex) made his List A debut.
- Points: Essex 2, Hampshire 0.

28 April 2019
11:00 BST
Scorecard

| Glamorgan (H); 323/7 (50 overs) | v | Surrey; 259 (46.4 overs) |
| Billy Root 113* (115); Morné Morkel 3/47 (10 overs) | | Jordan Clark 79 (82); Marchant de Lange 4/63 (10 overs) |

Glamorgan won by 64 runs
Sophia Gardens, Cardiff
Umpires: Jeff Evans and Russell Warren

- Surrey won the toss and elected to field.
- Points: Glamorgan 2, Surrey 0.

28 April 2019
11:00 BST
Scorecard

| Somerset; 242/9 (50 overs) | v | Gloucestershire (H); 246/6 (49.2 overs) |
| Lewis Gregory 52 (33); Benny Howell 3/45 (10 overs) | | Graeme van Buuren 61 (62); Lewis Gregory 2/38 (9.2 overs) |

Gloucestershire won by 4 wickets
County Ground, Bristol
Umpires: Tim Robinson and Ben Debenham

- Somerset won the toss and elected to bat.
- Points: Gloucestershire 2, Somerset 0.

30 April 2019
11:00 BST
Scorecard

| Essex (H); 283/7 (50 overs) | v | Sussex; 287/9 (49.5 overs) |
| Tom Westley 61 (65); David Wiese 3/54 (10 overs) | | Will Beer 75 (90); Matt Coles 3/72 (10 overs) |

Sussex won by 1 wicket
County Ground, Chelmsford
Umpires: Richard Kettleborough and Billy Taylor

- Essex won the toss and elected to bat.
- Points: Sussex 2, Essex 0.

30 April 2019
11:00 BST
Scorecard

| Glamorgan; 331/7 (50 overs) | v | Gloucestershire (H); 257 (48.3 overs) |
| Chris Cooke 161 (127); Benny Howell 3/83 (10 overs) | | Jack Taylor 75 (70); Marchant de Lange 3/41 (9 overs) |

Glamorgan won by 74 runs
County Ground, Bristol
Umpires: Richard Illingworth and Alex Wharf

- Glamorgan won the toss and elected to bat.
- Points: Glamorgan 2, Gloucestershire 0.

30 April 2019
11:00 BST
Scorecard

| Hampshire; 307 (49.2 overs) | v | Surrey (H); 254 (46.2 overs) |
| Liam Dawson 108 (93); Stuart Meaker 3/58 (8.5 overs) | | Mark Stoneman 70 (68); Kyle Abbott 3/58 (9.2 overs) |

Hampshire won by 53 runs
The Oval, London
Umpires: Ben Debenham and Neil Bainton

- Surrey won the toss and elected to field.
- Ryan Patel (Surrey) made his List A debut.
- Points: Hampshire 2, Surrey 0.

==== May ====
1 May 2019
11:00 BST
Scorecard

| Middlesex (H); 364/6 (50 overs) | v | Somerset; 246 (43.4 overs) |
| Sam Robson 106 (106); Lewis Gregory 2/71 (9 overs) | | Azhar Ali 46 (60); Nathan Sowter 3/50 (10 overs) |

Middlesex won by 118 runs
Brunton Memorial Ground, Radlett
Umpires: Rob Bailey and Paul Baldwin

- Somerset won the toss and elected to field.
- Points: Middlesex 2, Somerset 0.

2 May 2019
11:00 BST
Scorecard

| Hampshire (H); 355/5 (50 overs) | v | Sussex; 346 (49.3 overs) |
| Aiden Markram 130 (87); Mir Hamza 2/62 (10 overs) | | David Wiese 171 (126); Mason Crane 3/55 (7.3 overs) |

Hampshire won by 9 runs
Rose Bowl, Southampton
Umpires: Ben Debenham and Russell Warren

- Hampshire won the toss and elected to bat.
- Points: Hampshire 2, Sussex 0.

2 May 2019
11:00 BST
Scorecard

| Surrey (H); 127 (35.2 overs) | v | Kent; 131/2 (28 overs) |
| Dean Elgar 62* (94); Matt Milnes 3/37 (8 overs) | | Daniel Bell-Drummond 41 (62); Morné Morkel 1/20 (7 overs) |

Kent won by 8 wickets
The Oval, London
Umpires: Richard Kettleborough and Billy Taylor

- Surrey won the toss and elected to bat.
- Points: Kent 2, Surrey 0.

5 May 2019
11:00 BST
Scorecard

| Essex; 271/9 (50 overs) | v | Kent (H); 272/4 (46.4 overs) |
| Tom Westley 58 (66); Matt Milnes 3/60 (10 overs) | | Daniel Bell-Drummond 120* (122); Matt Coles 2/63 (8 overs) |

Kent won by 6 wickets
County Ground, Beckenham
Umpires: Russell Warren and Martin Saggers

- Kent won the toss and elected to field.
- Aaron Beard (Essex) made his List A debut.
- Points: Kent 2, Essex 0.

5 May 2019
11:00 BST
Scorecard

| Glamorgan; 285 (49.4 overs) | v | Middlesex (H); 289/5 (47.3 overs) |
| Charlie Hemphrey 87 (81); Nathan Sowter 4/58 (10 overs) | | Nick Gubbins 92 (91); Billy Root 2/36 (6 overs) |

Middlesex won by 5 wickets
Lord's, London
Umpires: Peter Hartley and Steve O'Shaughnessy

- Middlesex won the toss and elected to field.
- Points: Middlesex 2, Glamorgan 0.

5 May 2019
11:00 BST
Scorecard

| Somerset (H); 216 (40.3 overs) | v | Hampshire; 221/3 (31.3 overs) |
| George Bartlett 40 (42); Kyle Abbott 3/36 (7.3 overs) | | Aiden Markram 61 (60); Craig Overton 2/25 (7 overs) |

Hampshire won by 7 wickets
County Ground, Taunton
Umpires: Jeff Evans and Ian Blackwell

- Somerset won the toss and elected to bat.
- Points: Hampshire 2, Somerset 0.

5 May 2019
11:00 BST
Scorecard

| Gloucestershire; 335/6 (50 overs) | v | Sussex (H); 219 (43.2 overs) |
| Miles Hammond 95 (105); Will Beer 2/51 (9 overs) | | David Wiese 55 (58); Matthew Taylor 3/39 (8 overs) |

Gloucestershire won by 116 runs
The Saffrons, Eastbourne
Umpires: Billy Taylor and Nick Cook

- Gloucestershire won the toss and elected to bat.
- Points: Gloucestershire 2, Sussex 0.

7 May 2019
13:00 BST (D/N)
Scorecard

| Essex (H); 293 (49.5 overs) | v | Gloucestershire; 294/6 (48.5 overs) |
| Varun Chopra 156 (167); Ryan Higgins 2/55 (9.5 overs) | | James Bracey 113* (93); Aaron Beard 3/51 (10 overs) |

Gloucestershire won by 4 wickets
County Ground, Chelmsford
Umpires: Mike Burns and Chris Watts

- Essex won the toss and elected to bat.
- Points: Gloucestershire 2, Essex 0.

7 May 2019
13:00 BST (D/N)
Scorecard

| Middlesex; 380/5 (50 overs) | v | Kent (H); 347 (48.5 overs) |
| Max Holden 166 (139); Daniel Bell-Drummond 1/45 (7 overs) | | Zak Crawley 120 (123); James Harris 4/65 (10 overs) |

Middlesex won by 33 runs
St Lawrence Ground, Canterbury
Umpires: Paul Pollard and Steve O'Shaughnessy

- Middlesex won the toss and elected to bat.
- Points: Middlesex 2, Kent 0.

7 May 2019
13:00 BST (D/N)
Scorecard

| Surrey; 289/9 (50 overs) | v | Somerset (H); 292/5 (45.4 overs) |
| Dean Elgar 64 (77); Jamie Overton 4/64 (9 overs) | | James Hildreth 93 (89); Conor McKerr 3/56 (9.4 overs) |

Somerset won by 5 wickets
County Ground, Taunton
Umpires: Martin Saggers and Russell Warren

- Somerset won the toss and elected to field.
- Points: Somerset 2, Surrey 0.

7 May 2019
13:00 BST (D/N)
Scorecard

| Sussex (H); 347/7 (50 overs) | v | Glamorgan; 348/8 (48.4 overs) |
| Laurie Evans 110 (87); Marchant de Lange 3/74 (10 overs) | | Billy Root 78 (66); Danny Briggs 2/61 (10 overs) |

Glamorgan won by 2 wickets
County Ground, Hove
Umpires: Nick Cook and Ian Blackwell
Player of the match: Dan Douthwaite (Glamorgan)

- Sussex won the toss and elected to bat.
- Roman Walker (Glamorgan) made his List A debut.
- Points: Glamorgan 2, Sussex 0.

== Knockout stage ==
The winner of each group progressed straight to the semi-finals with the second and third placed teams playing a play-off match against a team from the other group which made up the play-offs. The winner of each play-off played one of the group winners in the semi-finals. The final took place at Lord's on 25 May 2019.

Play-offs
N2 | Worcestershire | 190
S3 | Somerset | 337/8
S2 | Middlesex | 284
N3 | Lancashire | 304/4

Semi-finals
N1 | Nottinghamshire | 222
S3 | Somerset | 337
S1 | Hampshire | 245/6
N3 | Lancashire | 241

Final
S3 | Somerset | 245/4
S1 | Hampshire | 244/8

=== Play-offs ===
10 May 2019
11:00 BST
Scorecard

| Somerset; 337/8 (50 overs) | v | Worcestershire (H); 190 (38 overs) |
| Tom Banton 112 (103); Wayne Parnell 3/50 (10 overs) | | Daryl Mitchell 34 (45); Azhar Ali 5/34 (7 overs) |

Somerset won by 147 runs
New Road, Worcester
Umpires: Steve O'Shaughnessy and Alex Wharf

- Worcestershire won the toss and elected to field.

10 May 2019
13:00 BST (D/N)
Scorecard

| Lancashire; 304/4 (50 overs) | v | Middlesex (H); 284 (48.5 overs) |
| Keaton Jennings 96 (111); Tom Helm 2/51 (10 overs) | | James Harris 117 (108); Saqib Mahmood 4/38 (10 overs) |

Lancashire won by 20 runs
Lord's, St John's Wood, London
Umpires: Peter Hartley and Rob Bailey
Player of the match: Saqib Mahmood (Lancashire)

- Middlesex won the toss and elected to field.

=== Semi-finals ===
12 May 2019
11:00 BST
Scorecard

| Somerset; 337 (50 overs) | v | Nottinghamshire (H); 222 (38.2 overs) |
| Peter Trego 73 (72); Jake Ball 4/62 (10 overs) | | Ben Slater 58 (60); Roelof van der Merwe 3/29 (9 overs) |

Somerset won by 115 runs
Trent Bridge, West Bridgford, Nottingham
Umpires: Mike Burns and Nick Cook

- Nottinghamshire won the toss and elected to field.

12 May 2019
11:30 BST
Scorecard

| Lancashire; 241 (47.4 overs) | v | Hampshire (H); 245/6 (49 overs) |
| Keaton Jennings 63 (74); Gareth Berg 5/26 (6.4 overs) | | Rilee Rossouw 85 (109); Saqib Mahmood 3/46 (10 overs) |

Hampshire won by 4 wickets
Rose Bowl, West End, Southampton
Umpires: Martin Saggers and David Millns
Player of the match: Gareth Berg (Hampshire)

- Lancashire won the toss and elected to bat.

=== Final ===
25 May 2019
11:00 BST
Scorecard

| Hampshire; 244/8 (50 overs) | v | Somerset; 245/4 (43.3 overs) |
| Sam Northeast 56 (89); Jamie Overton 3/48 | | James Hildreth 69* (68); Fidel Edwards 3/69 |

Somerset won by 6 wickets
Lord's, St John's Wood, London
Umpires: Martin Saggers and Rob Bailey
Player of the match: Jamie Overton

- Hampshire won the toss and elected to bat first

== Statistics ==
=== Highest score by a team ===
| Score | Team | Opposition | Ground |
|---|---|---|---|
| 433/7 (50 overs) | Nottinghamshire | Leicestershire | Trent Bridge, Nottingham |
| 417/7 (50 overs) | Nottinghamshire | Lancashire | Trent Bridge, Nottingham |
| 406/9 (50 overs) | Lancashire | Nottinghamshire | Trent Bridge, Nottingham |

As of 25 May 2019 — Source: ESPN Cricinfo

=== Lowest score by a team ===
| Score | Team | Opposition | Ground |
|---|---|---|---|
| 80 (37 overs) | Leicestershire | Lancashire | Old Trafford, Manchester |
| 88 (24 overs) | Surrey | Gloucestershire | County Ground, Bristol |
| 94 (27 overs) | Kent | Somerset | County Ground, Taunton |

As of 25 May 2019, completed innings only — Source: ESPN Cricinfo

=== Top score by an individual ===
| Score | Player | Team | Opposition | Ground |
|---|---|---|---|---|
| 190 | James Vince | Hampshire | Gloucestershire | Rose Bowl, Southampton |
| 171 | David Wiese | Sussex | Hampshire | Rose Bowl, Southampton |
| 166 | Dane Vilas | Lancashire | Nottinghamshire | Trent Bridge, Nottingham |
| 166 | Luke Wright | Sussex | Middlesex | Lord's, London |
| 166 | Max Holden | Middlesex | Kent | St Lawrence Ground, Canterbury |

As of 25 May 2019 — Source: ESPN Cricinfo

=== Best bowling figures by an individual ===
| BBI | Player | Team | Opposition | Ground |
|---|---|---|---|---|
| 6/37 | Saqib Mahmood | Lancashire | Northamptonshire | Old Trafford, Manchester |
| 6/62 | Nathan Sowter | Middlesex | Essex | County Ground, Chelmsford |
| 5/14 | Saqib Mahmood | Lancashire | Leicestershire | Old Trafford, Manchester |

As of 25 May 2019 — Source: ESPN Cricinfo

=== Most runs ===
| Player | Team | Matches | Innings | Runs | Average | HS | 100s | 50s |
|---|---|---|---|---|---|---|---|---|
| Billy Godleman | Derbyshire | 8 | 8 | 521 | 74.42 | 116 | 3 | 1 |
| Steven Croft | Lancashire | 10 | 9 | 516 | 73.71 | 110 | 1 | 3 |
| James Vince | Hampshire | 7 | 7 | 509 | 72.71 | 190 | 1 | 3 |
| Aiden Markram | Hampshire | 8 | 8 | 466 | 58.25 | 130 | 1 | 3 |
| James Hildreth | Somerset | 11 | 11 | 457 | 45.70 | 93 | 0 | 4 |

As of 25 May 2019 — Source: ESPN Cricinfo

=== Most wickets ===
| Players | Team | Matches | Overs | Wickets | Average | BBI | 4w | 5w |
|---|---|---|---|---|---|---|---|---|
| Saqib Mahmood | Lancashire | 10 | 95.3 | 28 | 18.50 | 6/37 | 1 | 2 |
| Nathan Sowter | Middlesex | 9 | 89.2 | 25 | 20.84 | 6/62 | 3 | 1 |
| Wayne Parnell | Worcestershire | 9 | 73.4 | 22 | 18.86 | 5/24 | 0 | 2 |
| Craig Overton | Somerset | 11 | 83.0 | 20 | 20.10 | 5/18 | 0 | 1 |
| Kyle Abbott | Hampshire | 10 | 81.5 | 20 | 23.55 | 3/36 | 0 | 0 |

As of 25 May 2019 — Source: ESPN Cricinfo
