= Sri Lankan cricket team in England and Ireland in 2016 =

International cricket tour

The Sri Lanka national cricket team toured England from 8 May to 5 July 2016 for a three-match Test series, a five-match One Day International (ODI) series and a one-off Twenty20 International (T20I) against the England cricket team. England won the Test series 2–0, the ODI series 3–0 and won the one-off T20I match by 8 wickets.

They also played two first-class matches against Essex and Leicestershire prior to the Test series, and two ODI matches against Ireland prior to the ODI series. The two first-class matches were both drawn and Sri Lanka won the ODI series against Ireland 2–0.

In April 2016, the ECB made a proposal that the series uses a points-based scoring system across all three formats, with both teams agreeing to the idea in principle. The following month, the points system was named Super Series and approved for this series and England's series against Pakistan. Four points were awarded for winning a Test match and two points for wins in ODIs or T20Is matches. No overall trophy was awarded, but there was a prize of £25,000, to be split amongst the players. England won the Super Series 20–4.

== England ==
Sri Lanka in England in 2016
	England	Sri Lanka
- Dates: 8 May – 5 July 2016
Captains	Alastair Cook (Tests); Eoin Morgan (ODIs, T20I)	Angelo Mathews

Test series
- Result: England won the 3-match series 2–0
Most runs	Jonny Bairstow (387)	Kaushal Silva (193)
Most wickets	James Anderson (21)	Nuwan Pradeep (10)
- Player of the series: Jonny Bairstow (Eng); Kaushal Silva (SL)

One Day International series
- Results: England won the 5-match series 3–0
Most runs	Jason Roy (316)	Dinesh Chandimal (267)
Most wickets	David Willey (10); Liam Plunkett (10)	Suranga Lakmal (5); Nuwan Pradeep (5)
- Player of the series: Jason Roy (Eng)

Twenty20 International series
- Results: England won the 1-match series 1–0
Most runs	Jos Buttler (73)	Danushka Gunathilaka (26)
Most wickets	Liam Dawson (3)	Angelo Mathews (2)

Super Series points
- England 20, Sri Lanka 4

=== Squads ===
Tests		ODIs		T20Is	
England	Sri Lanka	England	Sri Lanka	England	Sri Lanka
Alastair Cook (c); Moeen Ali; James Anderson; Jonny Bairstow (wk); Jake Ball; Stuart Broad; Nick Compton; Steven Finn; Alex Hales; Joe Root (vc); ~~Ben Stokes~~; James Vince; Chris Woakes	Angelo Mathews (c); ~~Dushmantha Chameera~~; Dinesh Chandimal (vc and wk); Chaminda Bandara; Dhananjaya de Silva; Niroshan Dickwella; Shaminda Eranga; Rangana Herath; Dimuth Karunaratne; Suranga Lakmal; Kusal Mendis; Dilruwan Perera; Kusal Perera; Nuwan Pradeep; ~~Dhammika Prasad~~; Dasun Shanaka; Kaushal Silva; Milinda Siriwardana; Lahiru Thirimanne	Eoin Morgan (c); Jonny Bairstow; Jos Buttler (vc and wk); Steven Finn; Alex Hales; Chris Jordan; Moeen Ali; Liam Plunkett; Adil Rashid; Joe Root; Jason Roy; James Vince; David Willey; Chris Woakes	Angelo Mathews (c); Dinesh Chandimal (vc and wk); Chaminda Bandara; Dhananjaya de Silva; Niroshan Dickwella; ~~Shaminda Eranga~~; Danushka Gunathilaka; Suraj Randiv; Suranga Lakmal; Farveez Maharoof; Kusal Mendis; Kusal Perera; Nuwan Pradeep; Seekkuge Prasanna; Dasun Shanaka; Milinda Siriwardana; Upul Tharanga; ~~Lahiru Thirimanne~~	Eoin Morgan (c); Jonny Bairstow; Jos Buttler (vc and wk); Sam Billings; Liam Dawson; Chris Jordan; Dawid Malan; Tymal Mills; Liam Plunkett; Adil Rashid; Jason Roy; James Vince; David Willey	Angelo Mathews (c); Dinesh Chandimal (vc and wk); Chaminda Bandara; Dhananjaya de Silva; Niroshan Dickwella; Danushka Gunathilaka; Suraj Randiv; Suranga Lakmal; Farveez Maharoof; Kusal Mendis; Kusal Perera; Nuwan Pradeep; Seekkuge Prasanna; Ramith Rambukwella; Dasun Shanaka; Milinda Siriwardana

Kusal Perera replaced Dhammika Prasad in Sri Lanka's Test squad. Chris Woakes was added to England's squad for the second Test as a replacement for the injured Ben Stokes, who was later ruled out of the series. Dushmantha Chameera suffered a stress fracture in his lower back and was ruled out of the tour. Chaminda Bandara was named as Chameera's replacement. Following the ODI matches in Ireland, Shaminda Eranga was admitted to hospital in Dublin to undergo tests on his heart. However, on the same day, he was suspended from bowling in international matches by the International Cricket Council (ICC) due to an illegal action reported during the second Test. Prior to the third ODI, Lahiru Thirimanne was ruled out of the rest of the series with a lower back strain.

=== Tour matches ===
==== First-class: Essex vs Sri Lankans ====
8–10 May 2016
Scorecard

Sri Lankans	v	Essex
254 (63 overs); Kusal Mendis 66 (106); Aaron Beard 4/62 (16 overs)		412/4d (100 overs); Jaik Mickleburgh 109 (188); Dhammika Prasad 2/78 (17.3 overs)
42/2 (13 overs); Dimuth Karunaratne 16* (32); Matt Dixon 1/17 (4 overs)

Match drawn
County Ground, Chelmsford
Umpires: Stephen Gale (Eng) and Steve O'Shaughnessy (Eng)

- Sri Lankans won the toss and elected to bat.
- No play was possible on day 3 due to rain.
- Aaron Beard (Essex) made his first-class debut.

==== First-class: Leicestershire vs Sri Lankans ====
13–15 May 2016
Scorecard

Sri Lankans	v	Leicestershire
367 (97.1 overs); Dasun Shanaka 112 (132); Rob Sayer 2/41 (12 overs)		375/5d (100 overs); Michael Burgess 98 (124); Rangana Herath 2/39 (24 overs)
200/4d (50.2 overs); Dimuth Karunaratne 100 (134); Robert Taylor 1/29 (11 overs)

Match drawn
Grace Road, Leicester
Umpires: Nick Cook (Eng) and Alex Wharf (Eng)

- Sri Lankans won the toss and elected to bat.

=== Test series ===
==== 1st Test ====
19–23 May 2016
Scorecard

England	v	Sri Lanka
298 (90.3 overs); Jonny Bairstow 140 (183); Dasun Shanaka 3/46 (13 overs)		91 (36.4 overs); Angelo Mathews 34 (62); James Anderson 5/16 (11.4 overs)
		119 (f/o) (35.2 overs); Kusal Mendis 53 (68); James Anderson 5/29 (13.3 overs)

England won by an innings and 88 runs
Headingley, Leeds
Umpires: Aleem Dar (Pak) and Rod Tucker (Aus)
Player of the match: Jonny Bairstow (Eng)

- Sri Lanka won the toss and elected to field.
- Play on day 1 was reduced to 53 overs due to rain.
- Play on day 2 ended early due to bad light.
- Rain stopped play before lunch on day 3 and play later resumed at 15:30.
- James Vince (Eng) and Dasun Shanaka (SL) made their Test debuts.
- James Anderson (Eng) took his first five-wicket haul at Leeds.
- James Anderson's match figures of 10 for 45 are the best for an England bowler against Sri Lanka.
- Points: England 4, Sri Lanka 0.

==== 2nd Test ====
27–31 May 2016
Scorecard

England	v	Sri Lanka
498/9d (132 overs); Moeen Ali 155* (207); Nuwan Pradeep 4/107 (33 overs)		101 (43.3 overs); Kusal Mendis 35 (62); Stuart Broad 4/40 (13 overs)
80/1 (23.2 overs); Alastair Cook 47* (65); Milinda Siriwardana 1/37 (7.2 overs)		475 (f/o) (128.2 overs); Dinesh Chandimal 126 (207); James Anderson 5/58 (27 overs)

England won by 9 wickets
Riverside Ground, Chester-le-Street
Umpires: Aleem Dar (Pak) and Sundaram Ravi (Ind)
Player of the match: James Anderson (Eng)

- England won the toss and elected to bat.
- Rangana Herath (SL) took his 300th Test wicket.
- James Anderson (Eng) took his 450th Test wicket.
- Alastair Cook (Eng) became the youngest player and the first England batsman to reach 10,000 runs in Test cricket.
- Umpire Aleem Dar was taken ill during the afternoon session on day 4 and was replaced by Rod Tucker, whose position as television umpire was taken by David Millns.
- Points: England 4, Sri Lanka 0.

==== 3rd Test ====
9–13 June 2016
Scorecard

England	v	Sri Lanka
416 (128.4 overs); Jonny Bairstow 167* (232); Rangana Herath 4/81 (36 overs)		288 (95.1 overs); Kaushal Silva 79 (152); Chris Woakes 3/31 (17.1 overs)
233/7d (71 overs); Alex Hales 94 (179); Nuwan Pradeep 3/37 (15 overs)		78/1 (24.2 overs); Dimuth Karunaratne 37* (66); James Anderson 1/27 (9 overs)

Match drawn
Lord's, London
Umpires: Sundaram Ravi (Ind) and Rod Tucker (Aus)
Player of the match: Jonny Bairstow (Eng)

- England won the toss and elected to bat.
- Play on day 4 was delayed until 14:40 due to rain.
- Play on day 5 was delayed until 13:20 due to rain. Rain then stopped play at 13:35.
- Jonny Bairstow's score of 167* is the highest score by an English wicket-keeper batsman in a home Test match and at Lord's.
- Points: England 2, Sri Lanka 2.

=== ODI series ===
==== 1st ODI ====
21 June 2016 (D/N)
Scorecard

Sri Lanka; 286/9 (50 overs)	v	England; 286/8 (50 overs)
Angelo Mathews 73 (109); Chris Woakes 2/56 (10 overs); David Willey 2/56 (10 overs)		Chris Woakes 95* (92); Angelo Mathews 2/22 (6 overs)

Match tied
Trent Bridge, Nottingham
Umpires: Rob Bailey (Eng) and Paul Reiffel (Aus)
Player of the match: Chris Woakes (Eng)

- England won the toss and elected to field.
- Chris Woakes' 95* is the highest score by a No. 8 batsman in ODIs.
- This was the first time that an ODI between England and Sri Lanka ended in a tie.
- Points: England 1, Sri Lanka 1.

==== 2nd ODI ====
24 June 2016 (D/N)
Scorecard

Sri Lanka; 254/7 (50 overs)	v	England; 256/0 (34.1 overs)
Upul Tharanga 53* (49); Adil Rashid 2/34 (10 overs)		Alex Hales 133* (110)

England won by 10 wickets
Edgbaston, Birmingham
Umpires: Michael Gough (Eng) and Bruce Oxenford (Aus)
Player of the match: Jason Roy (Eng)

- Sri Lanka won the toss and elected to bat.
- Alex Hales and Jason Roy made the highest first-wicket partnership (256) for England in ODIs.
- This partnership is also the first 200 run 1st wicket partnership for England vs Sri Lanka in ODIs.
- This partnership is also the highest for England for any wicket in ODIs.
- This was the highest total for a team that won by 10 wickets in ODIs.
- Points: England 2, Sri Lanka 0.

==== 3rd ODI ====
26 June 2016
Scorecard

Sri Lanka; 248/9 (50 overs)	v	England; 16/1 (4 overs)
Dinesh Chandimal 62 (77); Chris Woakes 3/34 (10 overs)		Joe Root 11* (16); Suranga Lakmal 1/8 (2 overs)

No result
County Ground, Bristol
Umpires: Paul Reiffel (Aus) and Tim Robinson (Eng)

- England won the toss and elected to field.
- The start of the England innings was delayed by nearly an hour due to the rain during the innings break.
- Rain stopped play at 16:28 and the match was abandoned with no further play possible.
- Liam Plunkett (Eng) took his 50th ODI wicket.
- Points: England 1, Sri Lanka 1.

==== 4th ODI ====
29 June 2016 (D/N)
Scorecard

Sri Lanka; 305/5 (42 overs)	v	England; 309/4 (40.1 overs)
Kusal Mendis 77 (64); Adil Rashid 2/57 (9 overs)		Jason Roy 162 (118); Nuwan Pradeep 2/78 (9 overs)

England won by 6 wickets (DLS method)
The Oval, London
Umpires: Rob Bailey (Eng) and Bruce Oxenford (Aus)
Player of the match: Jason Roy (Eng)

- England won the toss and elected to field.
- Rain stopped play during Sri Lanka's innings, the match was reduced to 42 overs per side and England's target was set at 308 runs.
- Jason Roy's score of 162 is the second highest score by an England player in ODIs.
- Roy's 162 was also the highest score made by a batsman in an ODI match at The Oval.
- This was England's second highest successful run chase in ODIs.
- Points: England 2, Sri Lanka 0.

==== 5th ODI ====
2 July 2016
Scorecard

England; 324/7 (50 overs)	v	Sri Lanka; 202 (42.4 overs)
Joe Root 93 (106); Danushka Gunathilaka 3/48 (10 overs)		Dinesh Chandimal 53 (66); David Willey 4/34 (9.4 overs)

England won by 122 runs
Sophia Gardens, Cardiff
Umpires: Michael Gough (Eng) and Paul Reiffel (Aus)
Player of the match: Jos Buttler (Eng)

- Sri Lanka won the toss and elected to field.
- Chaminda Bandara (SL) made his ODI debut.
- Chaminda Bandara conceded the most runs (83) for a Sri Lankan bowler on debut in an ODI.
- Points: England 2, Sri Lanka 0.

=== T20I series ===
==== Only T20I ====
5 July 2016
Scorecard

Sri Lanka; 140 (20 overs)	v	England; 144/2 (17.3 overs)
Danushka Gunathilaka 26 (16); Liam Dawson 3/27 (4 overs)		Jos Buttler 73* (49); Angelo Mathews 2/27 (4 overs)

England won by 8 wickets
Rose Bowl, Southampton
Umpires: Rob Bailey (Eng) and Michael Gough (Eng)
Player of the match: Jos Buttler (Eng)

- Sri Lanka won the toss and elected to bat.
- Liam Dawson and Tymal Mills (Eng); Chaminda Bandara, Kusal Mendis and Nuwan Pradeep (SL) all made their T20I debuts.
- Points: England 2, Sri Lanka 0.

== Ireland ==
Sri Lanka in Ireland in 2016
	Ireland	Sri Lanka
- Dates: 16 June – 18 June 2016
Captains	William Porterfield	Angelo Mathews

One Day International series
- Results: Sri Lanka won the 2-match series 2–0
Most runs	Kusal Perera (167)	William Porterfield (81)
Most wickets	Dasun Shanaka (6)	Barry McCarthy (4); Tim Murtagh (4)
- Player of the series: Dasun Shanaka (SL)

=== Squads ===
ODIs
Ireland	Sri Lanka
William Porterfield (c); John Anderson; George Dockrell; Ed Joyce; Tim Murtagh; Andrew McBrine; Barry McCarthy; Tim Murtagh; Kevin O'Brien; Niall O'Brien (wk); Stuart Poynter; Boyd Rankin; Max Sorensen; Paul Stirling; Stuart Thompson; Gary Wilson	Angelo Mathews (c); Dinesh Chandimal (vc and wk); Dhananjaya de Silva; Niroshan Dickwella; Shaminda Eranga; Nuwan Pradeep; Danushka Gunathilaka; Suraj Randiv; Suranga Lakmal; Farveez Maharoof; Kusal Mendis; Kusal Perera; Seekkuge Prasanna; Dasun Shanaka; Milinda Siriwardana; Upul Tharanga; Lahiru Thirimanne

=== ODI series ===
==== 1st ODI ====
16 June 2016
Scorecard

Sri Lanka; 303/7 (50 overs)	v	Ireland; 216 (40.4 overs)
Dinesh Chandimal 102* (109); Boyd Rankin 2/45 (10 overs)		William Porterfield 73 (88); Dasun Shanaka 5/43 (9 overs)

Sri Lanka won by 76 runs (DLS method)
Malahide Cricket Club Ground, Dublin
Umpires: Mark Hawthorne (Ire) and Paul Reiffel (Aus)

- Ireland won the toss and elected to field.
- Rain reduced Ireland's innings by 3 overs, with a revised target of 293 runs.
- Barry McCarthy (Ire), Dhananjaya de Silva, Kusal Mendis and Dasun Shanaka (SL) all made their ODI debuts.
- Dasun Shanaka (SL) became the twelfth player to take five wickets on debut in an ODI.

==== 2nd ODI ====
18 June 2016
Scorecard

Sri Lanka; 377/8 (50 overs)	v	Ireland; 241 (45 overs)
Kusal Perera 135 (128); Tim Murtagh 3/66 (10 overs)		Andrew McBrine 79 (64); Suranga Lakmal 4/38 (10 overs)

Sri Lanka won by 136 runs
Malahide Cricket Club Ground, Dublin
Umpires: Mark Hawthorne (Ire) and Bruce Oxenford (Aus)

- Ireland won the toss and elected to field.
- Sri Lanka's 377 is the highest batting total in an ODI in Ireland.
