= 2019 English cricket season =

English cricket season

County Championship
- Champions: Essex
- Runners-up: Somerset
- Most runs: Dom Sibley (1324)
- Most wickets: Simon Harmer (83)

Royal London One-Day Cup
- Champions: Somerset
- Runners-up: Hampshire
- Most runs: Billy Godleman (521)
- Most wickets: Saqib Mahmood (28)

t20 Blast
- Champions: Essex Eagles
- Runners-up: Worcestershire Rapids
- Most runs: Babar Azam (578)
- Most wickets: Ravi Rampaul (23)

Women's Cricket Super League
- Champions: Western Storm
- Runners-up: Southern Vipers
- Most runs: Danni Wyatt (466)
- Most wickets: Freya Davies (19)

Women's County Championship
- Champions: Kent
- Runners-up: Yorkshire
- Most runs: Sophia Dunkley (451)
- Most wickets: Katie Thompson (15); Natalie Rowbottom (15); Rebecca Silk (15); Beth Langston (15)

Women's Twenty20 Cup
- Champions: Warwickshire
- Runners-up: Lancashire
- Most runs: Sophie Luff (316)
- Most wickets: Laura Ellison (15)

PCA Player of the Year
- Ben Stokes

Wisden Cricketers of the Year
- Tammy Beaumont, Rory Burns, Jos Buttler, Sam Curran, Virat Kohli

The 2019 English cricket season ran between 26 March and 26 September. It was the 120th in which the County Championship has been an official competition and featured first-class, one-day and Twenty20 cricket competitions throughout England and Wales.

The season saw the 2019 Cricket World Cup played in the country between 30 May and 14 July, followed by an Ashes tour by Australia in August and September. Pakistan took part in a one-day tour before the World Cup and the England men's team played a One Day International in Ireland and a Test match against Ireland at Lord's, the first Test between the two teams. The West Indies and Australian women's teams both toured during the season.

The 18 first-class counties was competed in the 2019 County Championship, One-Day Cup and T20 Blast competitions, whilst women's teams competed for the Women's Cricket Super League, the Women's County Championship and the Women's Twenty20 Cup. The 2019 Minor Counties Championship and MCCA Knockout Trophy was competed for by the Minor Counties of England and Wales and club cricket was played throughout both countries.

The season was the last before the scheduled introduction of a city based 100-ball competition by the ECB in 2020 and changes to the organisation of Minor County cricket.

== International tours ==
Three men's international teams toured England and Wales during the season: Pakistan, Ireland and Australia. ODIs and T20Is were played against Pakistan, the first Test match between England and Ireland was played, and the Ashes contested between England and Australia. The Ashes series was played after the 2019 Cricket World Cup. The West Indies and Australian women's teams also toured the country, with Australia and England playing for the Women's Ashes.

=== Pakistan tour ===
Pakistan toured England during the end of April to play a complete limited overs leg, which consisted of a T20I and a five match ODI series ahead of the 2019 Cricket World Cup.

Pakistan played the one-off T20I at Cardiff, in which England won by 7 wickets to kick off the limited overs tour.

After playing the one-off T20I, Pakistan played a 5 match ODI series, with England winning all the matches except the first ODI which was ended in a no result due to rain.

Before both the limited over series, Pakistan played two List A matches against Kent and Northamptonshire followed by a T20 match played against Leicestershire.

=== Ireland tour ===
Ireland toured England to play a one-off four-day Test match, after they played their inaugural test match against Pakistan in 2018.

England won the Test by 143 runs.

=== 2019 Ashes series ===
After knocked out of the 2019 Cricket World Cup, in August, Australia played the 2019 edition of the Ashes series.

Australia retained the Ashes after winning the fourth Test to take an unassailable 2–1 lead in the series, but England's victory in the final Test meant the series was drawn 2–2, the first drawn Ashes series since 1972.

Before the series, Australia scheduled to play a first-class match against Australia A. Later, this match was replaced by a four-day intra squad match between Brad Haddin XII and Graeme Hick XII, which consisted of twelve Australian players each.

In between, after the completion of first Test, Australia played a three-day match against Worcestershire. Likewise, before the fourth Test, Australia played a three-day match against Derbyshire.

=== West Indies women's tour ===
The West Indies women's cricket team toured England in June 2019 to play three WODIs and three WT20Is. Before their visit to England, the West Indies women's team also toured Ireland to play three WT20I matches. England won the WODI series 3–0. England also won the T20I series 1–0, after two matches were abandoned due to rain.

=== Australia women's tour ===
The Australia women's cricket team toured England in June and July 2019 to play the England women's cricket team to contest the Women's Ashes. The tour consisted of three WODIs, a one-off Test match and three WT20Is.

Australia women won the WODI series 3–0, taking 6 points, and the one-off Test match was drawn, giving Australia an unassailable 8–2 lead in the series, to retain the Women's Ashes.

Later, Australia went on to win the WT20I series 2–1, therefore retaining the Ashes 12–4 in the points-based system.

== World Cup ==
The 12th edition of the Cricket World Cup took place at 11 grounds across England and Wales between 30 May and 14 July, with the final taking place at Lord's. A total of 48 matches were played in the tournament between 10 international teams, with the top four teams qualifying for the two semi-finals to determine the finalists. It was the fifth time that the Cricket World Cup had been held in the British Isles, following the 1975, 1979, 1983 and 1999 World Cups.

After six weeks of round-robin matches, which saw four games not have a result, India, Australia, England and New Zealand finished as the top four, with Pakistan missing out on net run rate.

In the knockout stage, England and New Zealand won their respective semi-finals to qualify for the final, which was played at Lord's in London. The final ended in a tie after the match ended with both teams scoring 241 runs, followed by the first Super Over in an ODI, England won the title, their first, on the boundary countback rule after the Super Over also finished level.

== Domestic cricket ==
=== MCCU matches ===
Between 26 March and 7 April, three rounds of matches between first-class counties and the six Marylebone Cricket Club University teams took place. Each first-class county played either a first-class match or a non first-class match against a university team before the start of the County Championship season in April.

In the opening round of fixtures, Alastair Cook scored 150* for Essex against Cambridge MCCU, in his first match since retiring from Test cricket. The opening round also saw Somerset beat Cardiff MCCU by 568 runs, a record margin for a first-class match in England. In the third and final round of matches, England Test cricketer Haseeb Hameed scored a double century, albeit in a fixture without first-class status.

In August 2019, the England and Wales Cricket Board (ECB) announced that the 2020 fixtures will be the last ones to have first-class status.

=== County Championship ===
The men's County Championship season began on 5 April and finished on 26 September, with each team playing 14 matches. As in 2018, Division One had eight teams and Division Two had ten teams. Essex won the Championship, with Nottinghamshire relegated and Lancashire, Northamptonshire and Gloucestershire promoted, as part of a plan to create a larger Division One for the 2020 County Championship.

=== One-Day Cup ===
The One-Day Cup competition was played in a block of matches starting on 17 April, having been brought forward to be played before the start of the World Cup. Teams was organised in two geographical divisions, with each team playing eight 50-over fixtures. Teams played every other team in their division, with the final played at Lord's on 25 May. Somerset beat defending champions Hampshire in the final.

=== t20 Blast ===
The men's Twenty20 Cup competition was played in a block of matches in the same geographical groups as the One-Day Cup. Group matches were played in a block starting on 18 July, with each team playing 14 group-stage matches. Finals Day took place on 21 September at Edgbaston. Essex beat defending champions Worcestershire in the final.

=== Women's County Championship ===
The 2019 Women's County Championship was played between 5 May and 2 June. Each of the eight teams in Division One of the Championship played seven one-day fixtures, once against each of the other teams. Kent won Division One, their eighth title. This was the final season of the Women's County Championship, with the tournament being replaced in the new women's domestic structure introduced from 2020.

=== Women's Twenty20 Cup ===
The 2019 Women's Twenty20 Cup took place in June 2019, with 35 county teams competing in three divisions. Warwickshire won Division One, claiming their first Twenty20 title.

=== Women's Cricket Super League ===
The group stages of the Women's Cricket Super League played between 6 and 28 August, with Finals Day taking place at Hove on 1 September. In the group stage, each team played each other both home and away with 10 group matches per side. Western Storm won the title, their second, beating Southern Vipers in the final. This was the last edition of the Women's Cricket Super League, being scheduled to be replaced in 2020 with The Hundred and the new women's regional structure.

=== Minor Counties Competitions ===
The Minor Counties Championship ran from June to September with teams organised in two divisions based on their geographical location. Each team played six three-day matches against teams from within their division, with the four-day final taking place at Banbury Cricket Club Ground in Oxfordshire.

The Unicorns Knockout Trophy and the group stages of the Unicorns T20 Cup competition took place before the start of the Championship, beginning in May. The finals of both competitions took place at Wormsley Park in Buckinghamshire in August.

This was the final year of the current format for Minor Counties competitions, with changes, including a change of name, scheduled to begin during 2020.
