= Chaminda Bandara =

Sri Lankan cricketer

Personal information
- Full name: Konara Mudiyanselage Chaminda Bandara
- Born: 22 May 1987 (age 39); Kegalle, Sri Lanka
- Batting: Left-handed
- Bowling: Left-arm medium-fast
- Role: Bowler

International information
- National side: Sri Lanka
- Only ODI (cap 172): 2 July 2016 v England
- Only T20I (cap 64): 5 July 2016 v England

Domestic team information
- Years: Team
- Kandy Youth Cricket Club
- Sinhalese Sports Club
- SLP Authority Cricket Club

Career statistics
Competition	ODI	T20I	FC	LA
Matches	1	1	75	46
Runs scored	1	1	515	66
Batting average	–	–	9.90	6.60
100s/50s	0/0	0/0	0/1	0/0
Top score	1*	1*	55	21
Balls bowled	60	6	8,650	1,919
Wickets	1	0	198	69
Bowling average	83.00	–	30.65	24.43
5 wickets in innings	0	–	3	1
10 wickets in match	0	–	1	0
Best bowling	1/83	–	9/68	5/39
Catches/stumpings	0/–	0/–	27/–	10/–
- Source: ESPNcricinfo, 28 April 2022

Konara Mudiyanselage Chaminda Bandara (born 22 May 1987) is a professional Sri Lankan cricketer. In June 2016, he was added to Sri Lanka's squad for the third Test against England, after Dushmantha Chameera was ruled out through injury.

== Domestic career ==
Bandara is a past pupil of St. Mary's College, Kegalle. He has played for five years in the domestic arena with 51 first-class matches and has taken 141 wickets. He took figures of 9 for 68 in his final first-class game before he represented his national team. The match was played in March against Sri Lanka Army Sports Club. During the AIA Premier League Tournament, in the 2015/16 season, Bandara was the only fast-bowler to feature in the top 15 wicket-takers list. He took 33 wickets from 9 matches at an average of 26.30.

== International career ==
On 2 July 2016 he made his One Day International (ODI) debut for Sri Lanka against England. He conceded 83 runs in ten overs, giving away eleven boundaries. His bowling figures are the worst by a Sri Lanka player on ODI debut. This is also the most by a bowler from a Full-Member team in a 50-over ODI. Sri Lanka lost the match by 133 runs and lost the series 3–0. On 5 July 2016 he made his Twenty20 International (T20I) debut for Sri Lanka against England.
