= Jared Warner =

English cricketer (born 1996)

Personal information
- Full name: Jared David Warner
- Born: 14 November 1996 (age 29); Wakefield, West Yorkshire, England
- Batting: Right-handed
- Bowling: Right-arm fast-medium

Domestic team information
- Years: Team
- 2019–2020: Yorkshire (squad no. 45)
- 2019: → Sussex (on loan)
- 2021–2023: Gloucestershire (squad no. 4)
- FC debut: 27 May 2019 Sussex v Glamorgan
- LA debut: 6 May 2019 Yorkshire v Durham

Career statistics
Competition	FC	LA	T20
Matches	7	10	1
Runs scored	97	0	1
Batting average	19.40	0.00	1.00
100s/50s	0/0	0/0	0/0
Top score	32*	0*	1
Balls bowled	643	432	12
Wickets	10	8	0
Bowling average	42.60	49.62	–
5 wickets in innings	0	0	–
10 wickets in match	0	0	–
Best bowling	3/35	3/42	–
Catches/stumpings	1/–	2/–	0/–
- Source: Cricinfo, 4 July 2022

Jared David Warner (born 14 November 1996) is an English cricketer who most recently played for Gloucestershire County Cricket Club. He made his List A debut on 6 May 2019, for Yorkshire in the 2019 Royal London One-Day Cup. He made his first-class debut on 27 May 2019, for Sussex in the 2019 County Championship. He made his Twenty20 debut on 29 May 2022, for Gloucestershire against the Sri Lanka Cricket Development XI during their tour of England. Gloucestershire announced at the end of the 2023 season that his contract would not be renewed.
