= Ben Birkhead =

English cricketer (born 1998)

Personal information
- Full name: Benjamin David Birkhead
- Born: 28 October 1998 (age 28); Halifax, West Yorkshire, England
- Batting: Right-handed
- Bowling: Right-arm fast-medium
- Role: Wicket-keeper

Domestic team information
- Years: Team
- 2019–2022: Yorkshire (squad no. 30)
- Only LA: 6 May 2019 Yorkshire v Durham
- Only T20: 20 September 2020 Yorkshire v Derbyshire

Career statistics
| Competition | List A | Twenty20 |
|---|---|---|
| Matches | 1 | 1 |
| Runs scored | – | – |
| Batting average | – | – |
| 100s/50s | – | – |
| Top score | – | – |
| Catches/stumpings | 1/0 | 1/0 |
- Source: CricketArchive, 20 September 2020

Benjamin David Birkhead (born 28 October 1998) is an English cricketer. He made his List A debut on 6 May 2019, for Yorkshire in the 2019 Royal London One-Day Cup. He made his Twenty20 debut 20 September 2020, for Yorkshire in the 2020 t20 Blast.
