= Tom Loten =

English cricketer (born 1999)

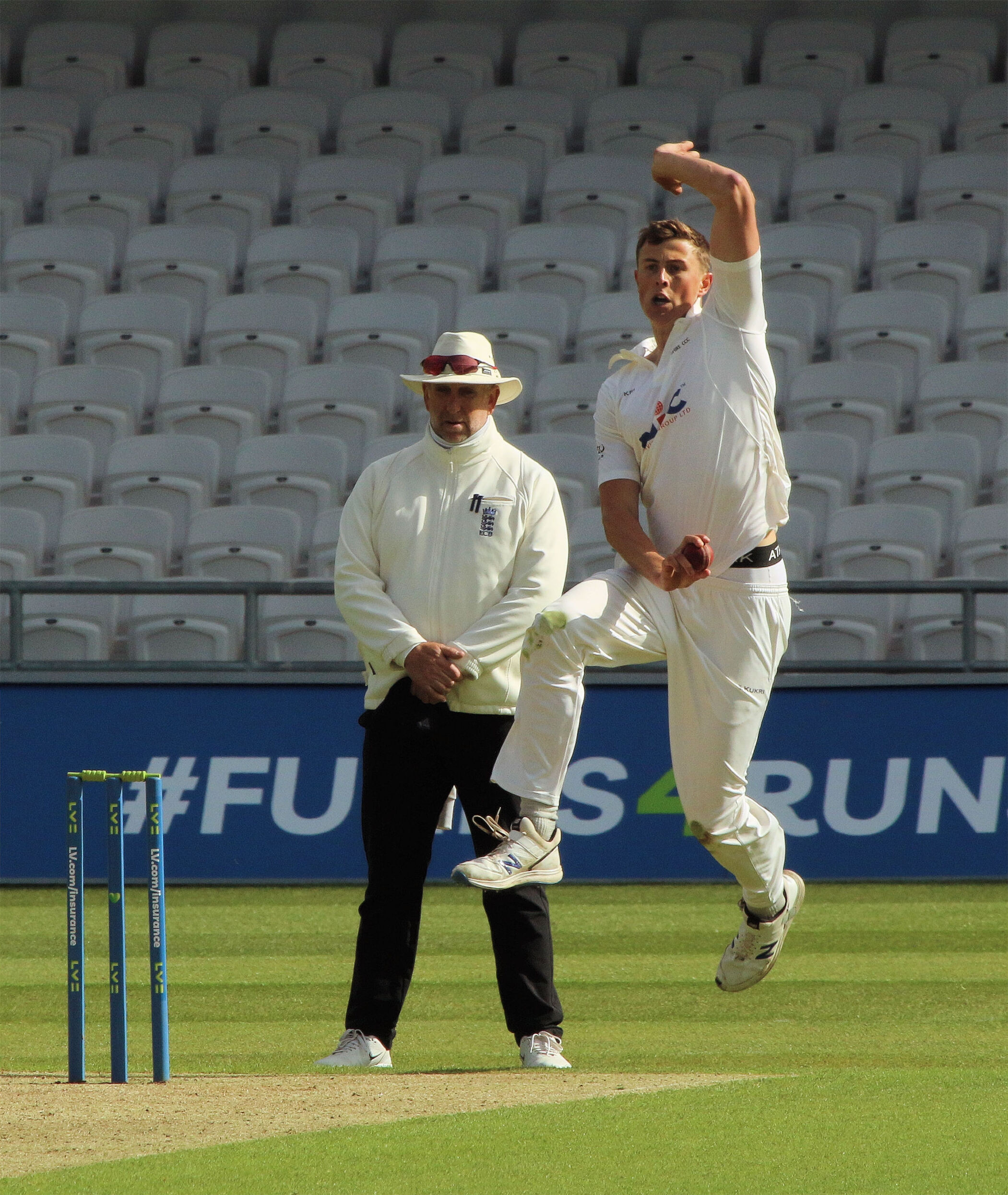
- Loten in 2022

Personal information
- Full name: Thomas William Loten
- Born: 8 January 1999 (age 27); York, North Yorkshire, England
- Batting: Right-handed
- Bowling: Right-arm medium-fast

Domestic team information
- Years: Team
- 2019–2022: Yorkshire (squad no. 40)
- 2023–2024: Nottinghamshire (squad no. 24)
- First-class debut: 23 September 2019 Yorkshire v Warwickshire
- List A debut: 6 May 2019 Yorkshire v Durham

Career statistics
Competition	FC	LA
Matches	7	16
Runs scored	137	170
Batting average	15.22	21.25
100s/50s	0/1	0/0
Top score	58	44
Balls bowled	289	578
Wickets	4	16
Bowling average	38.00	34.31
5 wickets in innings	0	0
10 wickets in match	0	0
Best bowling	2/31	3/26
Catches/stumpings	2/–	2/–
- Source: Cricinfo, 28 September 2024

Thomas William Loten (born 8 January 1999) is a retired English cricketer. William was educated at Pocklington School. He made his List A debut on 6 May 2019, for Yorkshire in the 2019 Royal London One-Day Cup. He made his first-class debut on 23 September 2019, for Yorkshire in the 2019 County Championship. He signed a two-year contract with Nottinghamshire after being released by Yorkshire at the end of the 2022 season. Loten announced his retirement from professional cricket in September 2024.
