= Mat Pillans =

South African cricketer (born 1991)

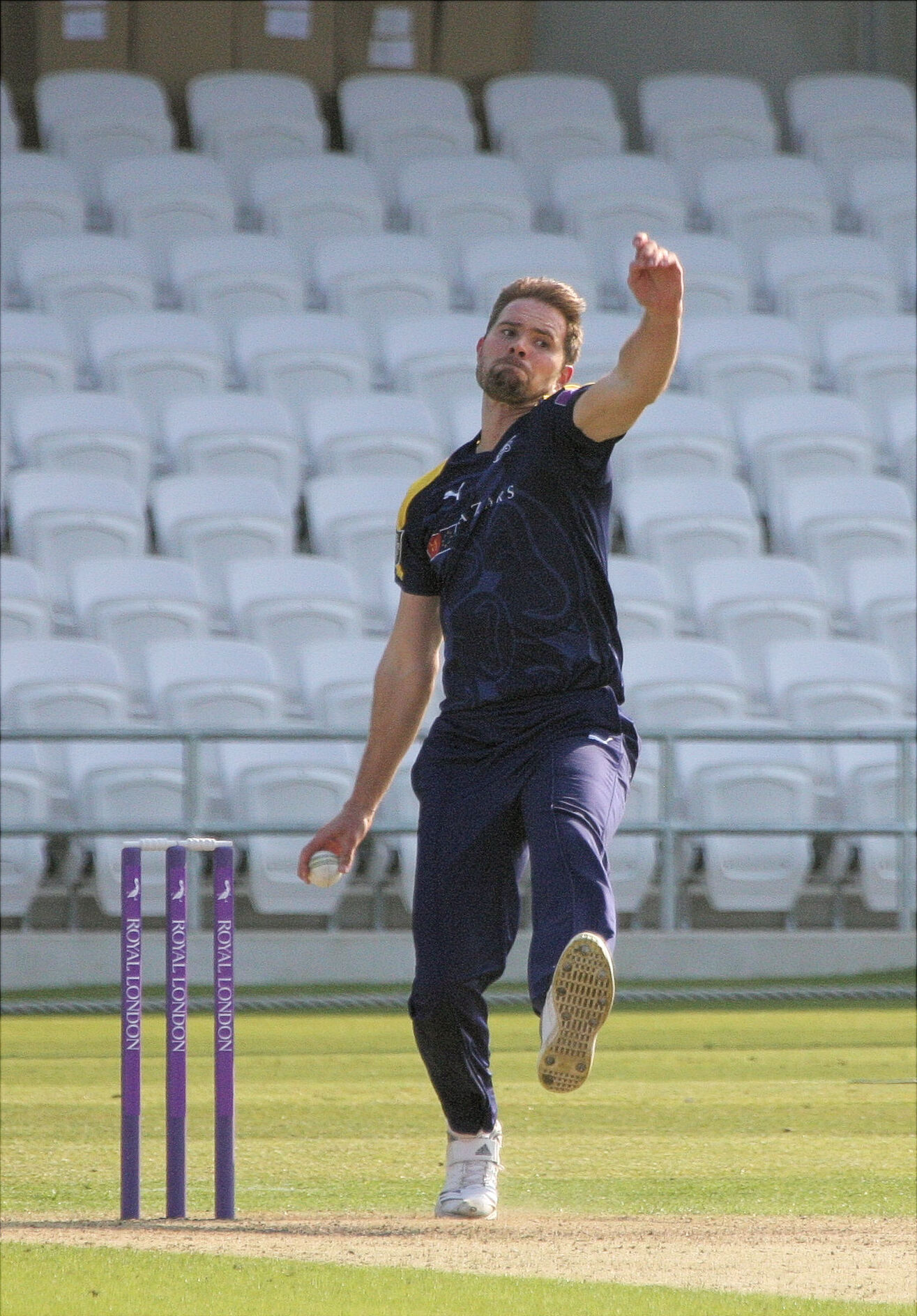
- Pillans in 2019

Personal information
- Full name: Mathew William Pillans
- Born: 4 July 1991 (age 35); Pretoria, Transvaal Province, South Africa
- Height: 6 ft 6 in (1.98 m)
- Batting: Right-handed
- Bowling: Right-arm fast-medium
- Role: Bowler

Domestic team information
- Years: Team
- 2012/13: Northerns
- 2013/14–2015/16: KwaZulu-Natal
- 2013/14–2015/16: Dolphins
- 2016–2018: Surrey (squad no. 47)
- 2017: → Leicestershire (on loan)
- 2018: → Yorkshire (on loan)
- 2019–2021: Yorkshire (squad no. 47)
- FC debut: 15 November 2012 Northerns v North West
- LA debut: 13 October 2013 KwaZulu-Natal v North West

Career statistics
Competition	FC	LA	T20
Matches	42	26	43
Runs scored	730	194	184
Batting average	13.51	19.39	16.72
100s/50s	0/1	0/0	0/0
Top score	56	40	34*
Balls bowled	6,505	938	782
Wickets	131	40	40
Bowling average	28.32	23.47	28.75
5 wickets in innings	3	1	0
10 wickets in match	1	0	0
Best bowling	6/67	5/29	3/15
Catches/stumpings	20/–	6/–	9/–
- Source: CricInfo, 15 July 2025

Mathew William Pillans (born 4 July 1991) is a South African cricketer who plays for Yorkshire, having previously played for Surrey. Primarily a right-arm fast-medium bowler, he also bats right handed. Pillans holds a British passport.

In August 2018, Pillans signed a three-year contract with Yorkshire, and joined them initially on loan until the end of the 2018 season.
