= Jack Blatherwick =

English cricketer (born 1998)

Personal information
- Full name: Jack Morgan Blatherwick
- Born: 4 June 1998 (age 28); Nottingham, Nottinghamshire, England
- Batting: Right-handed
- Bowling: Right-arm fast-medium
- Role: Bowler

Domestic team information
- Years: Team
- 2018–2020: Nottinghamshire (squad no. 80)
- 2021–present: Lancashire (squad no. 4)
- 2025: → Durham (loan)
- First-class debut: 16 September 2019 Notts v Warwickshire
- List A debut: 27 May 2018 Notts v Warwickshire

Career statistics
Competition	FC	LA	T20
Matches	19	23	34
Runs scored	204	240	204
Batting average	11.33	24.00	15.69
100s/50s	0/0	0/0	0/0
Top score	36	48*	34*
Balls bowled	1,881	929	512
Wickets	25	35	33
Bowling average	55.56	29.77	25.15
5 wickets in innings	0	0	0
10 wickets in match	0	0	0
Best bowling	4/28	4/30	3/14
Catches/stumpings	8/–	9/–	29/–
- Source: Cricinfo, 15 August 2026

Jack Morgan Blatherwick (born 4 June 1998) is an English cricketer who plays as a bowler: He made his List A debut for Nottinghamshire in the 2018 Royal London One-Day Cup on 27 May 2018. He made his first-class debut on 16 September 2019, for Nottinghamshire in the 2019 County Championship. Having moved to Lancashire in September 2020, he had a short-term loan spell at Durham in April 2025.

== Personal life ==
His uncle is the former Nottingham Forest, Burnley and Chesterfield footballer Steve Blatherwick.
