= Aaron Beard =

English cricketer (born 1997)

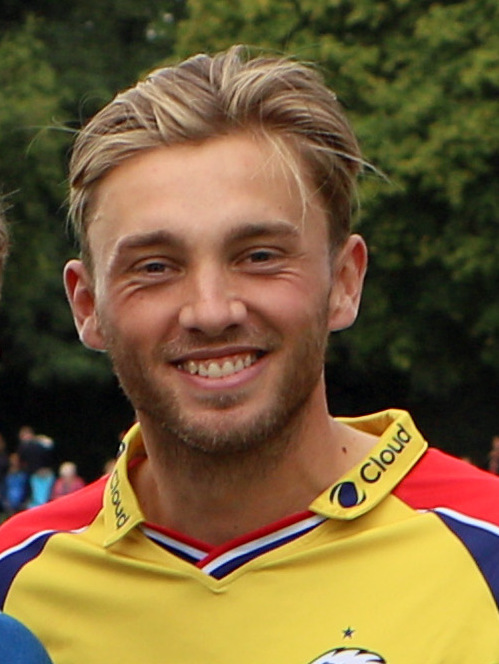

Personal information
- Full name: Aaron Paul Beard
- Born: 15 October 1997 (age 29); Chelmsford, Essex, England
- Batting: Left-handed
- Bowling: Right-arm fast-medium
- Role: Bowler

Domestic team information
- Years: Team
- 2015–2024: Essex (squad no. 14)
- 2022: → Sussex (loan) (squad no. 14)
- FC debut: 8 May 2016 Essex v Sri Lankans
- LA debut: 5 May 2019 Essex v Kent

Career statistics
Competition	FC	LA	T20
Matches	30	19	29
Runs scored	333	157	56
Batting average	19.58	17.44	18.66
100s/50s	0/1	0/0	0/0
Top score	58*	42*	13
Balls bowled	3,606	799	438
Wickets	62	21	25
Bowling average	34.77	43.76	27.72
5 wickets in innings	0	0	0
10 wickets in match	0	0	0
Best bowling	4/21	4/32	4/29
Catches/stumpings	12/–	4/–	6/–
- Source: Cricinfo, 19 August 2024

Aaron Paul Beard (born 15 October 1997) is a retired English cricketer. He made his first-class debut on 8 May 2016 for Essex against Sri Lankans during Sri Lanka's tour of England. Opening the bowling, he took a wicket in each of his first two overs, finishing with figures of 4/62 in the first innings. He made his List A debut on 5 May 2019, for Essex in the 2019 Royal London One-Day Cup. He made his Twenty20 debut on 2 August 2019, for Essex in the 2019 t20 Blast.

In April 2022, Beard and Mason Crane were signed on loan for one month to Sussex, after the club had multiple players unavailable due to injury. Beard announced his retirement from professional cricket in September 2024.
