= Gorse Lane =

Cricket ground in Grantham, Lincolnshire

Coordinates: 52°53′32″N 0°39′09″W

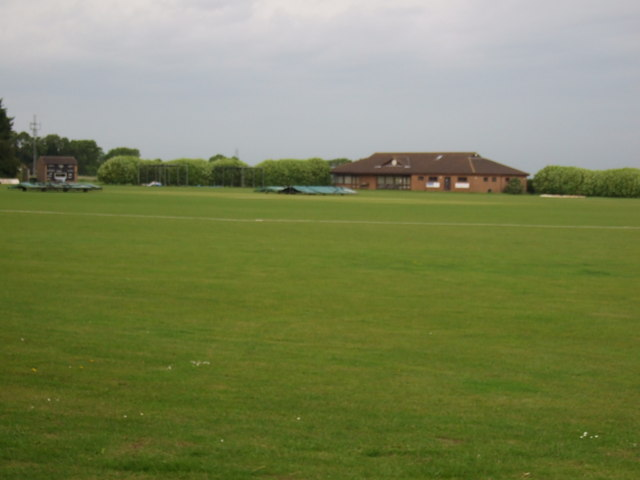

Ground information
- Location: Grantham, Lincolnshire
- Establishment: 1941 (first recorded match)

Team information
Lincolnshire	(1994-present)
Nottinghamshire	(2019-present)
- As of 3 May 2019; Source: Ground profile

Gorse Lane is a cricket ground in Grantham, Lincolnshire. It was constructed from scratch when the London Road ground was sold to Safeway. Opened for junior cricket in 1991, the club began using the field a year later. Lincolnshire first played at the ground in the 1994 MCCA Knockout Trophy against Northumberland. The ground has held five MCCA Knockout Trophy matches. In 1996 they played their first Minor Counties Championship match at the ground against Cumberland. From 1996 to present, the ground has hosted 20 Minor Counties Championship matches.

The ground has also held a single List-A match in the 2000 NatWest Trophy, which saw Lincolnshire play the Netherlands, a match which Lincolnshire won by 95 runs.

The ground was scheduled to host its second List A match with a Royal London One Day Cup match between Nottinghamshire and Durham in the North Group on 3 May 2019 however the match was abandoned without a ball being bowled due to persistent heavy rain and a wet outfield.

Gorse Lane is the home ground of Grantham Cricket Club.
