= George Lavelle =

English cricketer (born 2000)

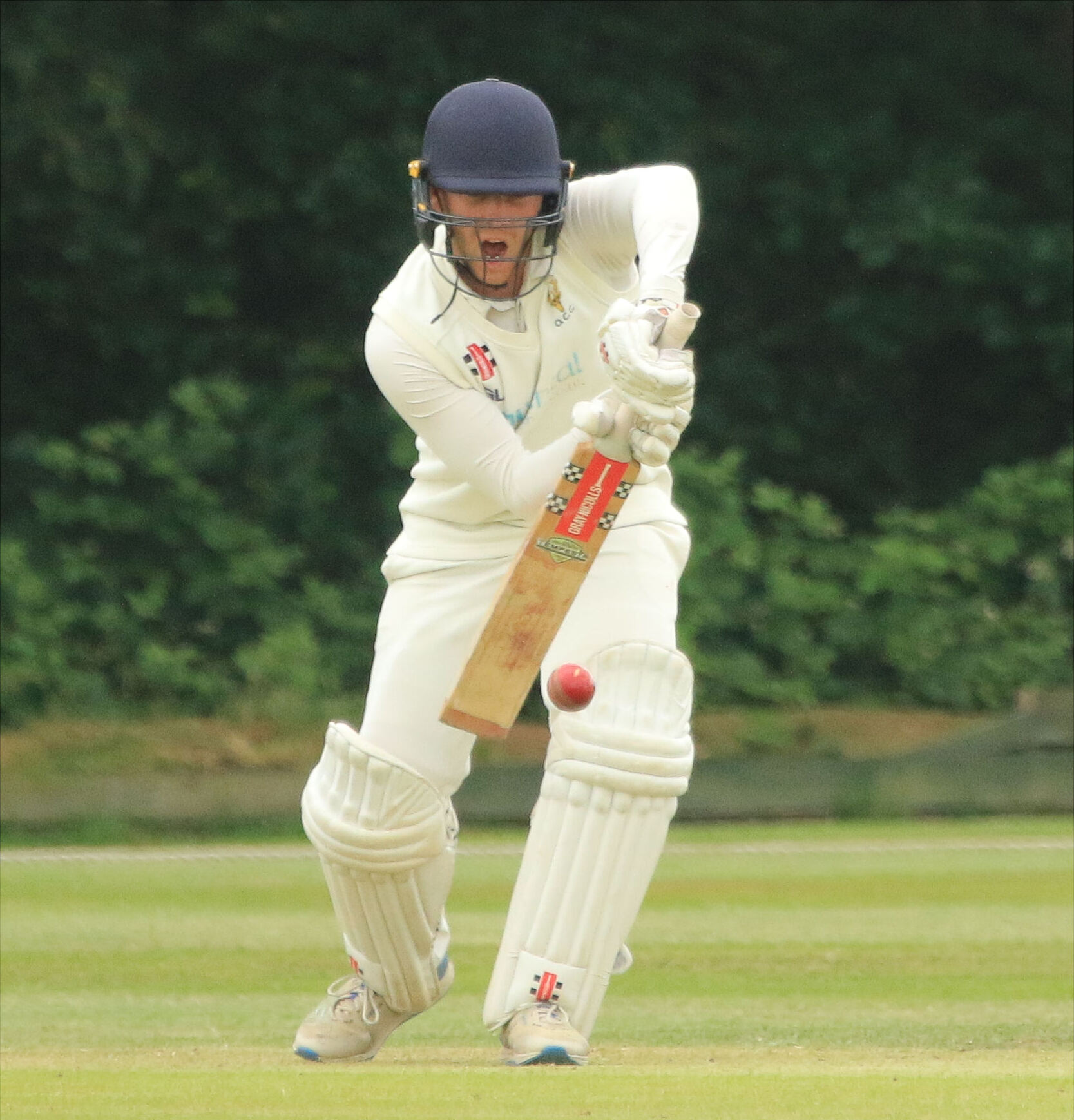
- Lavelle in 2025

Personal information
- Full name: George Isaac Davies Lavelle
- Born: 24 March 2000 (age 26); Lancashire, England
- Batting: Right-handed
- Role: Batsman, wicket-keeper

Domestic team information
- Years: Team
- 2018–2024: Lancashire (squad no. 24)
- First-class debut: 6 September 2020 Lancashire v Derbyshire
- List A debut: 23 July 2021 Lancashire v Sussex

Career statistics
Competition	FC	LA	T20
Matches	6	27	4
Runs scored	105	454	53
Batting average	10.50	28.37	13.25
100s/50s	0/0	0/5	0/0
Top score	32	72	20
Catches/stumpings	18/1	29/1	1/0
- Source: Cricinfo, 19 August 2024

George Isaac Davies Lavelle (born 24 March 2000) is an English professional cricketer. He plays as a wicket-keeper batsman. Lavelle signed his first professional contract with Lancashire in November 2018, having played for Lancashire's second XI and represented England at Under-19 level earlier that year. His deal was extended in November 2019. He made his first-class debut on 6 September 2020, for Lancashire in the 2020 Bob Willis Trophy. He made his Twenty20 debut 17 September 2020, for Lancashire in the 2020 t20 Blast. He made his List A debut on 23 July 2021, for Lancashire in the 2021 Royal London One-Day Cup.
