= Glamorgan County Cricket Club in 2021 =

Welsh cricket club season

Glamorgan County Cricket Club
2021 season
- Coach: (Wales) Matthew Maynard (Wales) David Harrison (One-Day Cup)
- Captain: (South Africa) Chris Cooke (Wales) Kiran Carlson (One-Day Cup)
- Overseas player: (Ireland) Andrew Balbirnie (Australia) Marnus Labuschagne (Australia) Michael Neser (South Africa) Colin Ingram (New Zealand) Hamish Rutherford
- Ground(s): Sophia Gardens, Cardiff
- County Championship: 6th, Division Two
- One-Day Cup: Winners
- T20 Blast: 9th, South Group
- Most runs: FC: Kiran Carlson (928); LA: Nick Selman (421); T20: Marnus Labuschagne (390)
- Most wickets: FC: Michael Hogan (34); LA: Joe Cooke (20); T20: Dan Douthwaite (15)
- Most catches: FC: Joe Cooke (7); David Lloyd (7); LA: Nick Selman (9); T20: Nick Selman (5); Marnus Labuschagne (5)
- Most wicket-keeping dismissals: FC: Chris Cooke (40 ct + 1 st); LA: Tom Cullen (18 ct + 1 st); T20: Chris Cooke (9 ct + 1 st)

The 2021 season was Glamorgan County Cricket Club's 134th year in existence and their 101st as a first-class cricket county. They played all of their home matches at Sophia Gardens in Cardiff. Due to the COVID-19 pandemic, the County Championship adopted a new, two-stage format for the 2021 season; in the first stage, the 18 counties were placed into three groups of six teams each, and played each of the other counties in their group home and away. At the end of the stage, the top two teams from each group were placed into Division One, the next two teams into Division Two and the bottom two teams into Division Three. In the second stage, they would then play home and away against each of the teams they had not already faced, carrying forward the average of the points they had accrued in the two games against the team they had already played in the first stage. Glamorgan finished third in Group 3, before coming last in Division Two with three defeats in their four matches. They also finished bottom of the South Group of the 2021 T20 Blast, although they finished top of Group B in the 2021 One-Day Cup, which meant they qualified directly for the semi-finals. There they beat Essex by five wickets, chasing down a target of 290 with two overs to spare. In the final against Durham, they were put in to bat and set a total of 296 before bowling Durham out for 238 to claim a first title since 2004.

The team was led by Matthew Maynard for a second year as head coach, although David Harrison handled coaching duties in the One-Day Cup while Maynard was serving as an assistant coach for Welsh Fire in the Hundred. Wicketkeeper-batsman Chris Cooke served as captain in the County Championship and the T20 Blast, while Kiran Carlson took over the captaincy for the One-Day Cup, while Cooke was playing for Birmingham Phoenix in The Hundred. Glamorgan's overseas players were Ireland batsman Andrew Balbirnie, who signed for the first month of the season; Australians Marnus Labuschagne and Michael Neser; South African Colin Ingram; and New Zealand batsman Hamish Rutherford, who signed for the One-Day Cup campaign and the last four matches of the County Championship season. Also brought in for the 2021 season was Durham bowler James Weighell, who signed a two-year contract, while former bowler James Harris returned on a two-week loan in late April, and Somerset batter Eddie Byrom joined on loan for the last month of the season before a permanent move ahead of the 2022 season.

Bowler Marchant de Lange left Glamorgan after four seasons as a domestic player to join Somerset as an overseas player. All-rounder Graham Wagg was released by Glamorgan at the end of the 2020 season after 10 years with the Welsh county, while Kieran Bull, Connor Brown and Owen Morgan were also allowed to leave. Glamorgan released England-born batter Charlie Hemphrey in May 2021 after he was deemed to no longer be considered qualified to play for England and would therefore be treated as an overseas player. Bowler Roman Walker joined Leicestershire on loan in July 2021, before moving permanently at the end of the season.

== County Championship ==
=== Group 3 ===
Team	Pld	W	L	T	D	A	Bat	Bowl	Ded	PCF	Pts	Qualification
Lancashire	10	4	1	0	5	0	22	24	0	0	150	Qualification for Division One of the Division Stage
Yorkshire	10	5	1	0	4	0	14	23	0	0	149	Qualification for Division One of the Division Stage
Glamorgan	10	2	2	0	6	0	18	29	0	0	127	Qualification for Division Two of the Division Stage
Northamptonshire	10	3	3	0	4	0	22	21	0	0	123	Qualification for Division Two of the Division Stage
Kent	10	0	3	0	7	0	15	26	0	0	97	Qualification for Division Three of the Division Stage
Sussex	10	1	5	0	4	0	18	28	0	0	94	Qualification for Division Three of the Division Stage

Updated to match(es) played on 14 July 2021. Source: BBC Sport, CricInfo, ECB

==== Yorkshire v Glamorgan (8–11 April) ====
8–11 April 2021
Scorecard

Glamorgan	v	Yorkshire
330 (101.4 overs); Timm van der Gugten 85* (145); Ben Coad 4/94 (26 overs)		193 (58.2 overs); Adam Lyth 52 (70); Callum Taylor 2/16 (4.2 overs)
241/4d (78.4 overs); Billy Root 110* (217); Ben Coad 3/18 (7 overs)		223/4 (66 overs); Adam Lyth 115* (196); Michael Hogan 2/32 (13 overs)

Match drawn
Headingley Cricket Ground, Leeds
Umpires: Paul Baldwin and Russell Warren

- Yorkshire won the toss and elected to field.
- Jamie McIlroy (Glam) made his first-class debut.

==== Glamorgan v Sussex (15–18 April) ====
15–18 April 2021
Scorecard

Glamorgan	v	Sussex
285 (75 overs); Kiran Carlson 127* (182); Ollie Robinson 4/50 (18 overs)		481 (123.3 overs); Stiaan van Zyl 113 (153); Michael Hogan 4/46 (23.3 overs)
349 (127.1 overs); Kiran Carlson 132* (198); Ollie Robinson 9/78 (30.1 overs)		154/2 (40.1 overs); Aaron Thomason 78* (118); David Lloyd 1/22 (5 overs)

Sussex won by 8 wickets
Sophia Gardens, Cardiff
Umpires: Alex Wharf and Ben Debenham

- Sussex won the toss and elected to field.

==== Northamptonshire v Glamorgan (22–25 April) ====
22–25 April 2021
Scorecard

Glamorgan	v	Northamptonshire
407 (113.1 overs); Chris Cooke 136 (227); Gareth Berg 3/69 (25 overs)		364 (105 overs); Adam Rossington 76 (95); James Weighell 2/56 (21 overs)
311/5d (82 overs); Nick Selman 69 (166); Nathan Buck 3/65 (15 overs)		357/3 (72.4 overs); Ricardo Vasconcelos 185* (221); David Lloyd 1/47 (10.4 overs)

Northamptonshire won by 7 wickets
County Cricket Ground, Northampton
Umpires: Peter Hartley and Steve O'Shaughnessy

- Northamptonshire won the toss and elected to field.

==== Glamorgan v Kent (29 April – 2 May) ====
29 April–2 May 2021
Scorecard

Kent	v	Glamorgan
138 (45.3 overs); Zak Crawley 33 (66); Timm van der Gugten 4/41 (11.3 overs)		197 (61.5 overs); David Lloyd 62 (103); Darren Stevens 5/53 (23 overs)
74 (26.5 overs); Heino Kuhn 14 (18); Michael Hogan 5/28 (10 overs)		19/0 (2.2 overs); David Lloyd 19* (8)

Glamorgan won by 10 wickets
Sophia Gardens, Cardiff
Umpires: Ian Blackwell and Neil Bainton

- Glamorgan won the toss and elected to field.
- Darren Stevens (Kent) took his 30th five-wicket haul in first-class cricket.
- 136.3 overs were bowled in total, making this the shortest four-day County Championship match involving Glamorgan.

==== Lancashire v Glamorgan (6–9 May) ====
6–9 May 2021
Scorecard

Glamorgan	v	Lancashire
344 (109.5 overs); David Lloyd 78 (129); James Anderson 3/40 (24 overs)		301/9d (94.3 overs); Keaton Jennings 64 (174); Andrew Salter 2/49 (13 overs)

Match drawn
Old Trafford Cricket Ground, Manchester
Umpires: Michael Gough and Nick Cook

- Glamorgan won the toss and elected to bat.
- No play was possible on day 3 due to rain.

==== Glamorgan v Yorkshire (13–16 May) ====
13–16 May 2021
Scorecard

Glamorgan	v	Yorkshire
149 (53.5 overs); David Lloyd 31 (70); Harry Brook 3/15 (8 overs)		230 (75.3 overs); Joe Root 99 (199); Michael Neser 5/39 (15 overs)
164/4 (40 overs); Kiran Carlson 88* (84); Ben Coad 2/16 (9 overs)

Match drawn
Sophia Gardens, Cardiff
Umpires: Martin Saggers and Nigel Llong

- Yorkshire won the toss and elected to field.
- No play was possible on day 1 due to rain.
- Harry Duke (Yorks) made his first-class debut.

==== Kent v Glamorgan (20–23 May) ====
20–23 May 2021
Scorecard

Kent	v	Glamorgan
307 (76.2 overs); Darren Stevens 190 (149); Timm van der Gugten 4/34 (19 overs)		64/3d (26 overs); Billy Root 26* (59); Matt Quinn 2/10 (10 overs)
60/1d (10 overs); Jordan Cox 27* (27); Michael Neser 1/28 (4 overs)		23/1 (7 overs); David Lloyd 17 (14); Matt Quinn 1/14 (4 overs)

Match drawn
St Lawrence Ground, Canterbury
Umpires: James Middlebrook and Richard Illingworth

- Glamorgan won the toss and elected to field.
- Only 22 overs of play were possible on day 1 due to rain.

==== Glamorgan v Lancashire (3–6 June) ====
3–6 June 2021
Scorecard

Lancashire	v	Glamorgan
173 (56.1 overs); Luke Wood 28 (39); Michael Neser 3/46 (15 overs)		150 (39.2 overs); Marnus Labuschagne 44 (55); Saqib Mahmood 3/34 (11.2 overs)
164 (51.1 overs); Alex Davies 47 (79); Michael Neser 4/53 (13 overs)		188/4 (58.1 overs); Marnus Labuschagne 63* (72); Matt Parkinson 1/22 (6 overs)

Glamorgan won by 6 wickets
Sophia Gardens, Cardiff
Umpires: Alex Wharf and Paul Baldwin

- Glamorgan won the toss and elected to field.

==== Sussex v Glamorgan (4–7 July) ====
4–7 July 2021
Scorecard

Sussex	v	Glamorgan
226 (75.3 overs); Danial Ibrahim 58 (147); Timm van der Gugten 3/45 (21 overs)		215 (64.5 overs); David Lloyd 38 (62); Jack Carson 3/39 (16.5 overs)
263/6d (79 overs); Ben Brown 100* (134); Timm van der Gugten 3/94 (23 overs)		154/5 (50.2 overs); Colin Ingram 27 (44); Jack Carson 3/61 (20.2 overs)

Match drawn
County Cricket Ground, Hove
Umpires: Ben Debenham and Russell Warren

- Sussex won the toss and elected to bat.
- Oli Carter (Sussex) made his first-class debut.

==== Glamorgan v Northamptonshire (11–14 July) ====
11–14 July 2021
Scorecard

Glamorgan	v	Northamptonshire
215 (77.3 overs); Saif Zaib 50 (95); Andrew Salter 4/18 (10.3 overs)		462/4d (113 overs); Kiran Carlson 170* (227); Luke Procter 3/77 (20 overs)
250/5 (92.4 overs); Rob Keogh 71* (137); Michael Neser 3/52 (20 overs)

Match drawn
Sophia Gardens, Cardiff
Umpires: Graham Lloyd and Tom Lungley

- Northamptonshire won the toss and elected to field.

=== Division 2 ===
Team	Pld	W	L	T	D	A	Bat	Bowl	Ded	PCF	Pts
Essex	4	3	0	0	1	0	9	12	0	19	96
Gloucestershire	4	3	1	0	0	0	4	12	0	12	76
Durham (Note: The scheduled Round 1 match between Durham and Surrey (30 August–2 September) was cancelled due to COVID-19. As a result, Division Two standings were decided on an average points per completed match basis.)	3	1	1	0	1	0	7	9	0	4	44
Northamptonshire	4	1	2	0	1	0	3	11	0	16	54
Surrey	3	0	1	0	2	0	5	6	0	13	40
Glamorgan	4	0	3	0	1	0	6	9	0	11.5	34.5

Source: CricketArchive, ESPNCricinfo, ECB

==== Glamorgan v Essex (30 August – 2 September) ====
30 August–2 September 2021
Scorecard

Glamorgan	v	Essex
134 (44.5 overs); Dan Douthwaite 39 (69); Shane Snater 6/39 (11.5 overs)		320 (101.2 overs); Nick Browne 102 (223); Steven Reingold 3/15 (6 overs)
112 (33.5 overs); Chris Cooke 47* (73); Sam Cook 5/37 (10.5 overs)

Essex won by an innings and 74 runs
Sophia Gardens, Cardiff
Umpires: Ben Debenham and Tim Robinson

- Glamorgan won the toss and elected to bat.
- Josh Rymell (Essex) made his first-class debut.

==== Durham v Glamorgan (5–8 September) ====
5–8 September 2021
Scorecard

Glamorgan	v	Durham
97 (32 overs); Hamish Rutherford 43 (43); Paul Coughlin 4/11 (5 overs)		503/8d (131.1 overs); Michael Jones 81 (157); Michael Hogan 3/80 (28 overs)
364 (130 overs); Dan Douthwaite 96 (185); Paul Coughlin 5/64 (23 overs)

Durham won by an innings and 42 runs
Riverside Ground, Chester-le-Street
Umpires: Ian Blackwell and Neil Pratt

- Durham won the toss and elected to field.

==== Glamorgan v Gloucestershire (12–15 September) ====
12–15 September 2021
Scorecard

Glamorgan	v	Gloucestershire
309 (107.3 overs); Eddie Byrom 78 (210); Tom Price 3/44 (18 overs)		419 (140.4 overs); Chris Dent 75 (153); Michael Hogan 3/49 (27.4 overs)
124 (42 overs); Andrew Salter 19 (35); Zafar Gohar 6/43 (18 overs)		15/0 (1.3 overs); Chris Dent 11* (6)

Gloucestershire won by 10 wickets
Sophia Gardens, Cardiff
Umpires: Ian Blackwell and Neil Pratt

- Gloucestershire won the toss and elected to field.
- Ben Wells (Glos) made his first-class debut.

==== Surrey v Glamorgan (21–24 September) ====
21–24 September 2021
Scorecard

Glamorgan	v	Surrey
672/6d (177 overs); Chris Cooke 205* (299); Amar Virdi 3/140 (39 overs)		722/4d (196 overs); Ollie Pope 274 (345); Eddie Byrom 2/64 (16 overs)

Match drawn
The Oval, London
Umpires: Ian Blackwell and Nigel Llong

- Glamorgan won the toss and elected to bat.
- Chris Cooke (Glam) scored his maiden double century in first-class cricket.

== One-Day Cup ==
=== Group stage ===
Pos	Team	Pld	W	L	T	NR	Ded	Pts	NRR
1	Glamorgan	8	4	2	0	2	0	10	0.818
2	Surrey	8	4	2	0	2	0	10	0.409
3	Yorkshire	8	4	2	0	2	0	10	−0.024
4	Leicestershire	8	4	3	0	1	0	9	−0.428
5	Nottinghamshire	8	3	3	0	2	0	8	0.686
6	Warwickshire	8	4	4	0	0	0	8	−0.025
7	Somerset	8	3	3	0	2	0	8	−0.412
8	Northamptonshire	8	2	4	0	2	0	6	−0.412
9	Derbyshire	8	1	6	0	1	0	3	−0.558

Updated to match(es) played on completed. Source: BBC Sport, ECB, ESPNcricinfo.
- advanced directly to the semi-finals
- advanced to the quarter-finals

==== Glamorgan v Warwickshire (22 July) ====
22 July 2021
11:00
Scorecard

Warwickshire; 221 (49.2 overs)	v	Glamorgan; 225/8 (49.4 overs)
Michael Burgess 73 (91); Joe Cooke 3/35 (10 overs)		Kiran Carlson 60 (67); Jacob Bethell 4/39 (10 overs)

Glamorgan won by 2 wickets
Sophia Gardens, Cardiff
Umpires: Ben Debenham and James Middlebrook

- Warwickshire won the toss and elected to bat.
- Chris Benjamin, Jacob Bethell, Ethan Brookes, Ashish Chakrapani, George Garrett, Manraj Johal, Ryan Sidebottom, Kiel van Vollenhoven (all Warks), Joe Cooke, Tom Cullen, Steven Reingold and Callum Taylor (all Glam) made their List A debuts.
- Points: Glamorgan 2, Warwickshire 0.

==== Northamptonshire v Glamorgan (25 July) ====
25 July 2021
11:00
Scorecard

Glamorgan; 295/6 (50 overs)	v	Northamptonshire; 236 (44.2 overs)
Hamish Rutherford 86 (97); Tom Taylor 2/54 (10 overs)		Tom Taylor 65* (59); Michael Hogan 3/26 (8 overs)

Glamorgan won by 59 runs
County Ground, Northampton
Umpires: James Middlebrook and Richard Kettleborough

- Northamptonshire won the toss and elected to field.
- Andy Gorvin (Glam), Emilio Gay and Freddie Heldreich (both Northants) made their List A debuts.
- Points: Glamorgan 2, Northamptonshire 0.

==== Somerset v Glamorgan (28 July) ====
28 July 2021
11:00
Scorecard

Somerset; 180/7 (37 overs)	v	Glamorgan; 179/9 (37 overs)
Ben Green 87 (72); Michael Hogan 4/33 (8 overs)		Billy Root 37 (51); Kasey Aldridge 3/39 (8 overs)

Somerset won by 1 run
County Ground, Taunton
Umpires: Ian Ramage and Russell Warren

- Glamorgan won the toss and elected to field.
- The match was reduced to 37 overs per side due to rain.
- Points: Somerset 2, Glamorgan 0.

==== Derbyshire v Glamorgan (30 July) ====
30 July 2021
11:00
Scorecard

Glamorgan	v	Derbyshire

No result
County Ground, Derby
Umpires: Graham Lloyd and Neil Pratt

- Derbyshire won the toss and elected to field.
- No play was possible due to rain.
- Mitch Wagstaff (Derbs) made his List A debut.
- Points: Derbyshire 1, Glamorgan 1.

==== Glamorgan v Surrey (3 August) ====
3 August 2021
11:00
Scorecard

Surrey; 132 (44.1 overs)	v	Glamorgan; 133/5 (26.5 overs)
Rikki Clarke 35 (62); Andrew Salter 3/37 (10 overs)		Hamish Rutherford 58 (52); Dan Moriarty 2/25 (9.5 overs)

Glamorgan won by 5 wickets
Sophia Gardens, Cardiff
Umpires: Ian Blackwell and Mark Newell

- Surrey won the toss and elected to bat.
- Points: Glamorgan 2, Surrey 0.

==== Leicestershire v Glamorgan (5 August) ====
5 August 2021
11:00
Scorecard

Glamorgan; 277/8 (50 overs)	v	Leicestershire; 0/0 (1 over)
Nick Selman 140 (144); George Rhodes 3/44 (8 overs)

No result
Grace Road, Leicester
Umpires: Paul Baldwin and Nick Cook

- Leicestershire won the toss and elected to field.
- Leicestershire were set a revised target of 257 runs from 43 overs due to rain.
- No further play was possible due to rain.
- Nick Selman (Glamorgan) scored his first century in List A cricket.
- Points: Glamorgan 1, Leicestershire 1.

==== Glamorgan v Nottinghamshire (8 August) ====
8 August 2021
11:00
Scorecard

Nottinghamshire; 73 (20.2 overs)	v	Glamorgan; 76/2 (16 overs)
Fateh Singh 21 (19); James Weighell 3/7 (4.2 overs)		Nick Selman 37* (47); Dane Paterson 1/5 (2 overs)

Glamorgan won by 8 wickets
Sophia Gardens, Cardiff
Umpires: Ian Gould and Neil Mallender

- Glamorgan won the toss and elected to field.
- The match was reduced to 23 overs per side due to rain.
- Sam King (Notts) made his List A debut.
- Sam King replaced Lyndon James for Nottinghamshire during the 1st innings as a concussion substitute.
- Points: Glamorgan 2, Nottinghamshire 0.

==== Glamorgan v Yorkshire (12 August) ====
12 August 2021
11:00
Scorecard

Yorkshire; 230 (48.5 overs)	v	Glamorgan; 226/8 (50 overs)
Jonny Tattersall 53 (62); James Weighell 3/55 (9.5 overs)		Nick Selman 92 (128); George Hill 3/49 (10 overs)

Yorkshire won by 4 runs
Sophia Gardens, Cardiff
Umpires: Ian Blackwell and Tom Lungley

- Glamorgan won the toss and elected to field.
- Points: Yorkshire 2, Glamorgan 0.

=== Knockout stage ===
Quarter-finals
A2	Essex	317/7
B3	Yorkshire	188
B2	Surrey	246/5
A3	Gloucestershire	242/7

Semi-finals
B1	Glamorgan	293/5
QF1	Essex	289
A1	Durham	281/5
QF2	Surrey	280/8

Final
SF1	Glamorgan	296/9
SF2	Durham	238

==== Semi-final: Glamorgan v Essex (16 August) ====
16 August 2021
11:00
Scorecard

Essex; 289 (49.4 overs)	v	Glamorgan; 293/5 (48 overs)
Alastair Cook 68 (66); Joe Cooke 5/61 (9.4 overs)		Hamish Rutherford 67 (44); Tom Westley 2/41 (10 overs)

Glamorgan won by 5 wickets
Sophia Gardens, Cardiff
Umpires: Mike Burns and Ian Gould

- Glamorgan won the toss and elected to field.
- Joe Cooke (Glamorgan) took his first five-wicket haul in List A cricket.

==== Final: Glamorgan v Durham (19 August) ====
19 August 2021
13:00 (D/N)
Scorecard

Glamorgan; 296/9 (50 overs)	v	Durham; 238 (45.1 overs)
Kiran Carlson 82 (59); Matty Potts 3/55 (10 overs)		Sean Dickson 84* (83); Andrew Salter 3/42 (10 overs)

Glamorgan won by 58 runs
Trent Bridge, Nottingham
Umpires: Neil Mallender and Steve O'Shaughnessy

- Durham won the toss and elected to field.

== T20 Blast ==
=== Standings ===
Pos	Team	Pld	W	L	T	NR	Pts	NRR
1	Kent Spitfires	14	9	4	0	1	19	0.657
2	Somerset	14	8	4	0	2	18	0.371
3	Sussex Sharks	14	6	3	0	5	17	0.479
4	Hampshire Hawks	14	6	5	0	3	15	0.388
5	Surrey	14	6	5	0	3	15	0.332
6	Gloucestershire	14	6	6	0	2	14	0.201
7	Essex Eagles	14	5	8	0	1	11	−0.468
8	Middlesex	14	4	9	0	1	9	−0.389
9	Glamorgan	14	3	9	0	2	8	−1.371

Source: BBC Sport, England and Wales Cricket Board

Advance to quarter-finals

=== Matches ===
==== Glamorgan v Gloucestershire (10 June) ====
10 June 2021
17:30 (D/N)
Scorecard

Gloucestershire; 179/6 (20 overs)	v	Glamorgan; 175/9 (20 overs)
Glenn Phillips 44 (32); Dan Douthwaite 3/28 (4 overs)		Marnus Labuschagne 93* (56); Benny Howell 3/39 (4 overs)

Gloucestershire won by 4 runs
Sophia Gardens, Cardiff
Umpires: Ian Gould and Nigel Llong
Player of the match: Marnus Labuschagne (Glam)

- Gloucestershire won the toss and elected to bat.
- Points: Gloucestershire 2, Glamorgan 0.

==== Glamorgan v Essex (13 June) ====
13 June 2021
14:30
Scorecard

Essex Eagles; 153/6 (20 overs)	v	Glamorgan; 156/3 (19 overs)
Will Buttleman 36 (26); Ruaidhri Smith 2/13 (3 overs)		Nick Selman 65 (45); Jack Plom 1/30 (3 overs)

Glamorgan won by 7 wickets
Sophia Gardens, Cardiff
Umpires: David Millns and Steve O'Shaughnessy
Player of the match: Nick Selman (Glam)

- Glamorgan won the toss and elected to field.
- Points: Glamorgan 2, Essex Eagles 0.

==== Surrey v Glamorgan (14 June) ====
14 June 2021
18:30 (D/N)
Scorecard

Glamorgan; 166/8 (20 overs)	v	Surrey; 167/5 (18.2 overs)
Marnus Labuschagne 74 (51); Dan Moriarty 3/26 (4 overs)		Jason Roy 64 (35); Marnus Labuschagne 2/31 (4 overs)

Surrey won by 5 wickets
The Oval, London
Umpires: Nick Cook and Peter Hartley
Player of the match: Jason Roy (Surrey)

- Surrey won the toss and elected to field.
- Points: Surrey 2, Glamorgan 0.

==== Glamorgan v Kent (16 June) ====
16 June 2021
17:00 (D/N)
Scorecard

Kent Spitfires; 144/7 (20 overs)	v	Glamorgan; 104 (17.4 overs)
Jordan Cox 32* (24); Dan Douthwaite 2/17 (3 overs)		James Weighell 24 (20); Matt Milnes 5/22 (3.4 overs)

Kent Spitfires won by 40 runs
Sophia Gardens, Cardiff
Umpires: Ian Blackwell and Ian Ramage
Player of the match: Matt Milnes (Kent)

- Kent Spitfires won the toss and elected to bat.
- Points: Kent Spitfires 2, Glamorgan 0.

==== Glamorgan v Middlesex (18 June) ====
18 June 2021
17:00 (D/N)
Scorecard

Glamorgan; 150/9 (20 overs)	v	Middlesex; 129/9 (20 overs)
Colin Ingram 75 (48); Steven Finn 4/19 (4 overs)		Paul Stirling 46 (36); Timm van der Gugten 3/16 (4 overs)

Glamorgan won by 21 runs
Sophia Gardens, Cardiff
Umpires: Mark Newell and Neil Bainton
Player of the match: Colin Ingram (Glam)

- Glamorgan won the toss and elected to bat.
- Tom Cullen (Glam) made his T20 debut.
- Points: Glamorgan 2, Middlesex 0.

==== Somerset v Glamorgan (19 June) ====
19 June 2021
19:00 (N)
Scorecard

Somerset	v	Glamorgan

Match abandoned
County Ground, Taunton
Umpires: Nigel Llong and Steve O'Shaughnessy

- No toss.
- No play was possible due to rain.
- Points: Somerset 1, Glamorgan 1.

==== Sussex v Glamorgan (22 June) ====
22 June 2021
19:00 (N)
Scorecard

Sussex Sharks	v	Glamorgan

Match abandoned
County Cricket Ground, Hove

- No toss.
- No play was possible due to a wet outfield.
- Points: Sussex Sharks 1, Glamorgan 1.

==== Gloucestershire v Glamorgan (24 June) ====
24 June 2021
18:30 (D/N)
Scorecard

Gloucestershire; 216/2 (20 overs)	v	Glamorgan; 182/8 (20 overs)
Glenn Phillips 94* (41); Callum Taylor 1/21 (2 overs); Marnus Labuschagne 1/21 (2 overs)		David Lloyd 44 (22); Ryan Higgins 2/27 (3 overs)

Gloucestershire won by 34 runs
County Ground, Bristol
Umpires: James Middlebrook and Tim Robinson
Player of the match: Glenn Phillips (Glos)

- Glamorgan won the toss and elected to field.
- Points: Gloucestershire 2, Glamorgan 0.

==== Middlesex v Glamorgan (27 June) ====
27 June 2021
14:30
Scorecard

Glamorgan; 170/8 (20 overs)	v	Middlesex; 171/3 (17.4 overs)
Dan Douthwaite 53 (31); Daryl Mitchell 3/37 (4 overs)		Stephen Eskinazi 91* (56); Dan Douthwaite 2/27 (2.4 overs)

Middlesex won by 7 wickets
Radlett Cricket Club, Radlett
Umpires: Nick Cook and Tom Lungley
Player of the match: Stephen Eskinazi (Middx)

- Glamorgan won the toss and elected to bat.
- Points: Middlesex 2, Glamorgan 0.

==== Glamorgan v Surrey (29 June) ====
29 June 2021
17:30 (D/N)
Scorecard

Glamorgan; 153/6 (20 overs)	v	Surrey; 152/9 (20 overs)
Billy Root 41* (28); Gus Atkinson 2/46 (4 overs)		Ollie Pope 60 (45); Prem Sisodiya 2/22 (4 overs)

Glamorgan won by 1 run
Sophia Gardens, Cardiff
Umpires: Hassan Adnan and Paul Baldwin
Player of the match: Billy Root (Glam)

- Surrey won the toss and elected to field.
- Sam Pearce (Glam) made his T20 debut.
- Points: Glamorgan 2, Surrey 0.

==== Essex v Glamorgan (1 July) ====
1 July 2021
19:00 (N)
Scorecard

Glamorgan; 104 (17 overs)	v	Essex Eagles; 108/2 (12.2 overs)
Chris Cooke 25 (22); Jack Plom 2/16 (3 overs)		Dan Lawrence 55* (31); Roman Walker 1/8 (2 overs)

Essex Eagles won by 8 wickets
County Cricket Ground, Chelmsford
Umpires: Mark Newell and Neil Mallender
Player of the match: Dan Lawrence (Essex)

- Glamorgan won the toss and elected to bat.
- Points: Essex Eagles 2, Glamorgan 0.

==== Glamorgan v Sussex (2 July) ====
2 July 2021
17:30 (D/N)
Scorecard

Sussex Sharks; 201/8 (20 overs)	v	Glamorgan; 168 (18.4 overs)
Luke Wright 77 (41); Dan Douthwaite 3/28 (4 overs)		David Lloyd 51 (29); Archie Lenham 4/26 (4 overs)

Sussex Sharks won by 33 runs
Sophia Gardens, Cardiff
Umpires: Ian Ramage and Paul Pollard
Player of the match: Archie Lenham (Sussex)

- Sussex Sharks won the toss and elected to bat.
- Points: Sussex Sharks 2, Glamorgan 0.

==== Glamorgan v Somerset (16 July) ====
16 July 2021
18:30 (D/N)
Scorecard

Somerset; 181/5 (20 overs)	v	Glamorgan; 107 (17.4 overs)
Devon Conway 70* (52); Roman Walker 3/15 (4 overs)		Dan Douthwaite 25 (16); Lewis Goldsworthy 3/14 (4 overs)

Somerset won by 74 runs
Sophia Gardens, Cardiff
Umpires: Graham Lloyd and Peter Hartley
Player of the match: Devon Conway (Som)

- Somerset won the toss and elected to bat.
- Points: Somerset 2, Glamorgan 0.

==== Hampshire v Glamorgan (18 July) ====
18 July 2021
14:30
Scorecard

Glamorgan; 184/4 (20 overs)	v	Hampshire Hawks; 187/4 (13 overs)
Marnus Labuschagne 78 (47); Brad Wheal 3/39 (4 overs)		D'Arcy Short 69 (30); Andrew Salter 2/31 (3 overs)

Hampshire Hawks won by 6 wickets
Rose Bowl, Southampton
Umpires: Ben Debenham and Neil Pratt
Player of the match: D'Arcy Short (Hants)

- Hampshire Hawks won the toss and elected to field.
- Points: Hampshire Hawks 2, Glamorgan 0.

== Pre-season and friendlies ==
=== Three-day: Glamorgan v Cardiff UCCE (29–31 March) ===
29–31 March
Scorecard

Cardiff UCCE	v	Glamorgan
285 (102.2 overs); Lorenzo Machado 73 (130); Michael Hogan 2/28 (20 overs)		273 (73.2 overs); Billy Root 59 (111); Steven Reingold 4/37 (14.2 overs)
117 (59.3 overs); Sam Pearce 20 (47); Dan Douthwaite 3/6 (5 overs)		106/6 (19.3 overs); Andrew Balbirnie 31 (38); Tim Wyatt 2/12 (5 overs)

Match drawn
Sophia Gardens, Cardiff
Umpires: Alex Wharf and Russell Warren

- Glamorgan won the toss and elected to field.
- Both teams could name up to 13 players (11 batting, 11 fielding).

=== 50-over: Glamorgan v Wales National County (20 July) ===
20 July
Scorecard

Glamorgan; 202 (48.4 overs)	v	Wales National County; 205/7 (49.4 overs)
Tom Cullen 41 (82); Lukas Carey 3/39 (9.4 overs)		Connor Brown 67 (99); Roman Walker 2/35 (9.5 overs)

Wales National County won by 3 wickets
Sophia Gardens, Cardiff
Umpires: Ian Ramage and Russell Warren

- Glamorgan won the toss and elected to bat.

== Statistics ==
=== Batting ===
First-class
Player	Matches	Innings	NO	Runs	HS	Ave	SR	100	50	0	4s	6s
Kiran Carlson	14	23	4	928	170*	48.84	66.47	3	5	2	120	0
David Lloyd	14	25	1	828	121	34.50	63.59	1	5	2	116	3
Chris Cooke	14	21	7	816	205*	58.28	54.18	4	1	3	75	6
Dan Douthwaite	13	16	1	482	96	32.13	46.88	0	4	3	63	6
Billy Root	11	18	2	442	110*	27.62	45.61	1	1	2	51	3
Hamish Rutherford	4	7	0	260	71	37.14	54.16	0	2	1	38	0
Marnus Labuschagne	6	9	2	228	77	32.57	65.51	0	2	1	32	0
Andrew Salter	10	11	4	221	90	31.57	34.69	0	1	1	34	0
Callum Taylor	6	8	2	215	84	35.83	38.94	0	2	1	23	1
Joe Cooke	8	13	2	203	68	18.45	35.48	0	1	1	28	1
Source: ESPNcricinfo

List A
Player	Matches	Innings	NO	Runs	HS	Ave	SR	100	50	0	4s	6s
Nick Selman	10	9	1	421	140	52.62	73.60	1	2	0	34	1
Hamish Rutherford	10	9	0	308	86	34.22	93.61	0	4	0	36	7
Kiran Carlson	10	9	1	232	82	29.00	98.72	0	2	0	27	4
Billy Root	10	8	0	191	67	23.87	77.01	0	2	1	14	1
Steven Reingold	10	9	0	187	40	20.77	59.74	0	0	0	22	1
Tom Cullen	10	8	3	175	58*	35.00	79.18	0	1	1	14	1
Joe Cooke	10	8	3	174	66*	34.80	119.17	0	1	0	20	3
Callum Taylor	3	3	0	53	36	17.66	82.81	0	0	0	3	1
Lukas Carey	10	5	4	51	19*	51.00	121.42	0	0	0	7	0
Andrew Salter	7	3	2	42	33	42.00	150.00	0	0	0	3	1
Source: ESPNcricinfo

Twenty20
Player	Matches	Innings	NO	Runs	HS	Ave	SR	100	50	0	4s	6s
Marnus Labuschagne	8	8	1	390	93*	55.71	140.79	0	4	0	35	11
David Lloyd	12	12	0	302	52	25.16	147.31	0	2	1	31	15
Dan Douthwaite	12	11	1	203	53	20.30	153.78	0	1	2	7	18
Colin Ingram	12	12	1	174	75	15.81	104.19	0	1	1	18	4
Kiran Carlson	12	11	0	141	32	12.81	127.02	0	0	0	12	4
Nick Selman	6	6	0	130	65	21.66	126.21	0	1	0	12	5
Chris Cooke	11	11	2	122	26	13.55	103.38	0	0	0	11	1
James Weighell	7	7	0	96	51	13.71	135.21	0	1	1	8	6
Billy Root	6	5	1	88	41*	22.00	110.00	0	0	1	5	5
Callum Taylor	5	5	1	39	16	9.75	88.63	0	0	0	2	1
Source: ESPNcricinfo

=== Bowling ===
First-class
Player	Matches	Innings	Overs	Maidens	Runs	Wickets	BBI	BBM	Ave	Econ	SR	5w	10w
Michael Hogan	13	21	332.5	78	874	34	5/28	7/61	25.70	2.62	58.73	1	0
Timm van der Gugten	11	17	274.3	54	823	27	4/34	6/139	30.48	2.99	61.00	0	0
Michael Neser	5	8	127.0	29	386	23	5/39	7/99	16.78	3.03	33.13	1	0
David Lloyd	14	20	170.3	24	558	21	4/11	6/32	26.57	3.27	48.71	0	0
Dan Douthwaite	13	20	181.1	18	781	17	2/16	4/48	45.94	4.31	63.94	0	0
Andrew Salter	10	13	218.5	41	687	15	4/18	4/58	45.80	3.13	87.53	0	0
James Weighell	4	8	80.1	9	359	7	2/46	3/69	51.28	4.47	68.71	0	0
Callum Taylor	6	8	146.2	16	484	5	2/16	2/78	96.80	3.30	175.60	0	0
James Harris (cricketer, born 1990)	2	4	44.5	3	159	4	2/5	2/21	39.75	3.54	67.25	0	0
Lukas Carey	3	4	54.0	9	179	4	3/56	3/56	44.75	3.31	81.00	0	0
Source: ESPNcricinfo

List A
Player	Matches	Innings	Overs	Maidens	Runs	Wickets	BBI	Ave	Econ	SR	4w	5w
Joe Cooke	10	8	62.5	2	286	20	5/61	14.30	4.55	18.85	0	1
Michael Hogan	10	9	67.1	7	201	16	4/33	12.56	2.99	25.18	1	0
Lukas Carey	10	8	63.2	2	352	12	2/24	29.33	5.55	31.66	0	0
Andrew Salter	7	5	44.0	2	164	9	3/37	18.22	3.72	29.33	0	0
James Weighell	5	4	30.1	0	169	8	3/7	21.12	5.60	22.62	0	0
Steven Reingold	10	6	27.0	0	163	5	1/16	32.60	6.03	32.40	0	0
Callum Taylor	3	3	18.0	0	91	3	1/6	30.33	5.05	36.00	0	0
Roman Walker	1	1	9.2	0	53	1	1/53	53.00	5.67	56.00	0	0
Andy Gorvin	4	3	18.0	0	74	1	1/11	74.00	4.11	108.00	0	0
Source: ESPNcricinfo

Twenty20
Player	Matches	Innings	Overs	Maidens	Runs	Wickets	BBI	Ave	Econ	SR	4w	5w
Dan Douthwaite	12	12	34.4	0	294	15	3/28	19.60	8.48	13.86	0	0
Marnus Labuschagne	8	8	22.0	0	193	9	2/22	21.44	8.77	14.66	0	0
Roman Walker	6	6	18.0	0	128	8	3/15	16.00	7.11	13.50	0	0
Prem Sisodiya	8	8	31.0	0	256	7	2/22	36.57	8.25	26.57	0	0
Andrew Salter	8	8	26.0	0	243	7	2/31	34.71	9.34	22.28	0	0
Timm van der Gugten	9	9	30.2	1	292	7	3/16	41.71	9.62	26.00	0	0
Ruaidhri Smith	5	5	19.0	0	138	4	2/13	34.50	7.26	28.50	0	0
James Weighell	7	7	17.0	0	195	3	1/22	65.00	11.47	34.00	0	0
Callum Taylor	5	2	4.0	0	34	2	1/13	17.00	8.50	12.00	0	0
David Lloyd	12	4	8.0	0	71	1	1/18	71.00	8.87	48.00	0	0
Source: ESPNcricinfo
