= Josh Sullivan =

Josh Sullivan may refer to:

- Josh Sullivan (baseball)
- Josh Sullivan (cricketer)
