= 2021 One-Day Cup =

Cricket tournament

2021 Royal London One-Day Cup
- Dates: 22 July – 19 August 2021
- Administrator: England and Wales Cricket Board
- Cricket format: Limited overs cricket (50 overs)
- Tournament format(s): Group stage and knockout
- Champions: Glamorgan (4th title)
- Participants: 18
- Matches: 77
- Most runs: Graham Clark (646)
- Most wickets: Joe Cooke (19)
- Official website: ecb.co.uk

The 2021 Royal London One-Day Cup tournament was a limited overs cricket competition that formed part of the 2021 English cricket season in England and Wales. Matches were contested over 50 overs per side, having List A cricket status, with all eighteen first-class counties competing in the tournament. The tournament started on 22 July 2021, with the final taking place on 19 August 2021 at Trent Bridge in Nottingham. Somerset were the defending champions winning the 2019 tournament, with no tournament taking place in 2020 due to the COVID-19 pandemic.

In August 2021, the Group A match between Middlesex and Gloucestershire was cancelled due to a COVID-19 outbreak in the Gloucestershire team. Therefore, the group was decided on an average points per game basis.

On the final day of group stage matches, Durham and Glamorgan qualified to the semi-finals, after finishing at top of their respective groups. Gloucestershire, Essex from group A, and Surrey, Yorkshire from group B, all qualified to the quarter-finals. In the first quarter-final, Essex beat Yorkshire by 129 runs to advance. The second quarter-final saw Surrey beat Gloucestershire by five wickets to also advance. Glamorgan beat Essex by five wickets in the first semi-final to progress to the final of the tournament. They were joined in the final by Durham, who beat Surrey by five wickets in the second semi-final match. Glamorgan won the tournament, beating Durham by 58 runs in the final.

== Format ==
Each county played eight group stage matches – four at home and four away, with the top three counties in each group progressing to the knockout stages.

== Teams ==
The teams were placed into the following groups:

- Group A: Durham, Essex, Gloucestershire, Hampshire, Kent, Lancashire, Middlesex, Sussex, Worcestershire
- Group B: Derbyshire, Glamorgan, Leicestershire, Northamptonshire, Nottinghamshire, Somerset, Surrey, Warwickshire, Yorkshire

=== Group A ===
Team	Primary home ground	Other grounds	Coach	Captain
Durham	Riverside Ground, Chester-le-Street	North Marine Road Ground, Scarborough; Roseworth Terrace, Gosforth	(New Zealand) James Franklin	(England) Scott Borthwick
Essex	County Ground, Chelmsford	—	(England) Anthony McGrath	(England) Tom Westley
Gloucestershire	County Ground, Bristol	–	(Australia) Ian Harvey (interim)	(England) Chris Dent
Hampshire	Rose Bowl, Southampton	–	(South Africa) Adrian Birrell	(South Africa) Kyle Abbott
Kent	County Cricket Ground, Beckenham	–	(England) Matt Walker	(England) Sam Billings
Lancashire	Old Trafford, Manchester	Sedbergh School, Sedbergh	(England) Glen Chapple	(South Africa) Dane Vilas
Middlesex	Radlett Cricket Club, Radlett	–	(Australia) Stuart Law	(England) Stephen Eskinazi
Sussex	County Ground, Hove	–	(England) Ian Salisbury	(England) Ben Brown (England) Tom Haines (from 24 July)
Worcestershire	New Road, Worcester	–	(England) Alex Gidman	(England) Joe Leach

=== Group B ===
Team	Primary home ground	Other grounds	Coach	Captain
Derbyshire	County Ground, Derby	Queen's Park, Chesterfield	(Zimbabwe) Dave Houghton	(England) Billy Godleman
Glamorgan	Sophia Gardens, Cardiff	–	(England) David Harrison	(England) Kiran Carlson
Leicestershire	Grace Road, Leicester	—	(England) Paul Nixon	(Netherlands) Colin Ackermann
Northamptonshire	County Ground, Northampton	—	(England) David Ripley	(South Africa) Ricardo Vasconcelos
Nottinghamshire	John Fretwell Sporting Complex, Nettleworth	Gorse Lane, Grantham	(England) Peter Moores	(England) Peter Trego
Somerset	County Ground, Taunton	—	(England) Paul Tweddle	(England) Ben Green
Surrey	The Oval, London	Woodbridge Road, Guildford	(England) Vikram Solanki	(England) Rory Burns
Warwickshire	Edgbaston, Birmingham	—	(England) Mark Robinson	(England) Will Rhodes
Yorkshire	North Marine Road Ground, Scarborough	Clifton Park, York	(England) Rich Pyrah	(England) Gary Ballance

== Group A ==
=== Fixtures ===
==== July ====
22 July 2021
11:00
Scorecard

Hampshire; 273 (49.1 overs)	v	Essex; 275/7 (44.3 overs)
Nick Gubbins 62 (59); Simon Harmer 3/42 (10 overs)		Tom Westley 69 (70); Scott Currie 3/58 (8 overs)

Essex won by 3 wickets
Rose Bowl, Southampton
Umpires: Ian Blackwell and Mark Newell

- Essex won the toss and elected to field.
- Scott Currie, Tom Prest, Tom Scriven, John Turner (Hampshire), Will Buttleman and Michael Pepper (Essex) all made their List A debuts.
- Points: Essex 2, Hampshire 0.

22 July 2021
11:00
Scorecard

Durham; 405/4 (50 overs)	v	Kent; 302/8 (50 overs)
Graham Clark 141 (119); Darren Stevens 1/50 (8 overs)		George Munsey 96 (79); Chris Rushworth 3/29 (7 overs)

Durham won by 103 runs
County Cricket Ground, Beckenham
Umpires: Nick Cook and Chris Watts

- Kent won the toss and elected to field.
- Jack Campbell, Luke Doneathy (Durham), James Logan, Tawanda Muyeye and Marcus O'Riordan (Kent) all made their List A debuts.
- Points: Durham 2, Kent 0.

23 July 2021
11:00
Scorecard

Sussex; 270/9 (50 overs)	v	Lancashire; 274/8 (49 overs)
Travis Head 56 (60); Liam Hurt 3/55 (10 overs)		Danny Lamb 86* (69); Archie Lenham 4/59 (9 overs)

Lancashire won by 2 wickets
Sedbergh School, Sedbergh
Umpires: Neil Pratt and Paul Baldwin

- Sussex won the toss and elected to bat.
- George Lavelle, Jack Morley (Lancashire), Oli Carter, Tom Clark, James Coles, Henry Crocombe, Tom Haines, Danial Ibrahim, Archie Lenham, Joe Sarro and Harrison Ward (Sussex) all made their List A debuts.
- Points: Lancashire 2, Sussex 0.

25 July 2021
11:00
Scorecard

Middlesex; 212 (45.4 overs)	v	Essex; 213/1 (39 overs)
Jack Davies 70 (81); Shane Snater 3/45 (8.4 overs)		Alastair Cook 92* (111); Ethan Bamber 1/41 (5 overs)

Essex won by 9 wickets
County Ground, Chelmsford
Umpires: Chris Watts and Ian Gould

- Essex won the toss and elected to field.
- Ethan Bamber, Joe Cracknell, Jack Davies, Luke Hollman and Thilan Walallawita (Middlesex) all made their List A debuts.
- Points: Essex 2, Middlesex 0.

25 July 2021
11:00
Scorecard

Gloucestershire; 171 (48 overs)	v	Lancashire; 177/4 (43.4 overs)
Matthew Taylor 51* (64); Danny Lamb 5/30 (9 overs)		Keaton Jennings 47 (84); Josh Shaw 4/36 (10 overs)

Lancashire won by 6 wickets
County Ground, Bristol
Umpires: Ian Ramage and Neil Bainton

- Lancashire won the toss and elected to field.
- Ben Wells (Gloucestershire) and George Balderson (Lancashire) both made their List A debuts.
- Danny Lamb (Lancashire) took his first five-wicket haul in List A cricket.
- Points: Lancashire 2, Gloucestershire 0.

25 July 2021
11:00
Scorecard

Sussex	v	Durham

Match abandoned
County Cricket Ground, Hove
Umpires: Billy Taylor and Mark Newell

- No toss.
- No play was possible due to rain.
- Points: Sussex 1, Durham 1.

25 July 2021
11:00
Scorecard

Kent; 322/7 (50 overs)	v	Worcestershire; 323/7 (49.1 overs)
George Munsey 108 (113); Ed Barnard 2/72 (9 overs)		Joe Leach 88 (51); James Logan 2/45 (8 overs)

Worcestershire won by 3 wickets
New Road, Worcester
Umpires: Paul Pollard and Tom Lungley

- Worcestershire won the toss and elected to field.
- Josh Baker, Jacques Banton and Adam Finch (Worcestershire) made their List A debuts.
- George Munsey (Kent) scored his first century in List A cricket.
- Points: Worcestershire 2, Kent 0.

27 July 2021
11:00
Scorecard

Worcestershire; 228/7 (40.3 overs)	v	Gloucestershire; 82/4 (11 overs)
Jack Haynes 59 (61); Tom Smith 2/36 (7.3 overs)		Graeme van Buuren 38* (29); Joe Leach 2/15 (3 overs)

Worcestershire won by 11 runs (DLS method)
County Ground, Bristol
Umpires: Nick Cook and Paul Baldwin

- Gloucestershire won the toss and elected to field.
- Gloucestershire were set a revised target of 94 runs from 11 overs due to rain.
- Points: Worcestershire 2, Gloucestershire 0.

27 July 2021
11:00
Scorecard

Hampshire; 328/7 (50 overs)	v	Sussex; 230 (41.2 overs)
Nick Gubbins 131* (119); Will Beer 2/34 (6 overs)		Travis Head 52 (48); Nick Gubbins 4/38 (7 overs)

Hampshire won by 98 runs
Rose Bowl, Southampton
Umpires: Richard Illingworth and Tom Lungley

- Hampshire won the toss and elected to bat.
- Points: Hampshire 2, Sussex 0.

27 July 2021
11:00
Scorecard

Durham; 288/8 (50 overs)	v	Middlesex; 225/9 (36 overs)
Scott Borthwick 76 (86); Tim Murtagh 2/38 (5 overs)		Peter Handscomb 75 (71); Paul van Meekeren 3/47 (7 overs)

Durham won by 2 runs (DLS method)
Radlett Cricket Club, Radlett
Umpires: Mark Newell and Richard Kettleborough

- Durham won the toss and elected to bat.
- Middlesex were set a revised target of 228 runs from 36 overs due to rain.
- Points: Durham 2, Middlesex 0.

28 July 2021
11:00
Scorecard

Lancashire; 71/0 (14.5 overs)	v	Kent
Josh Bohannon 39* (54)

No result
County Cricket Ground, Beckenham
Umpires: Ian Blackwell and Ian Gould

- Kent won the toss and elected to field.
- No further play was possible due to rain.
- Nathan Gilchrist (Kent) made his List A debut.
- Points: Lancashire 1, Kent 1.

29 July 2021
11:00
Scorecard

Durham; 335/4 (50 overs)	v	Gloucestershire; 336/6 (49.4 overs)
Graham Clark 140 (125); Daniel Worrall 4/58 (10 overs)		James Bracey 90 (72); Liam Trevaskis 2/53 (10 overs)

Gloucestershire won by 4 wickets
North Marine Road, Scarborough
Umpires: Paul Pollard and Rob White

- Gloucestershire won the toss and elected to field.
- Points: Gloucestershire 2, Durham 0.

29 July 2021
14:00 (D/N)
Scorecard

Worcestershire; 338/7 (50 overs)	v	Essex; 156 (31.3 overs)
Jack Haynes 153 (128); Simon Harmer 2/54 (10 overs)		Adam Wheater 77 (82); Brett D'Oliveira 3/8 (2.3 overs)

Worcestershire won by 182 runs
County Ground, Chelmsford
Umpires: Chris Watts and Richard Illingworth

- Essex won the toss and elected to field.
- Ben Allison and Jack Plom (Essex) both made their List A debuts.
- Jack Haynes and Brett D'Oliveira (Worcestershire) both scored their respective maiden centuries in List A cricket.
- Points: Worcestershire 2, Essex 0.

30 July 2021
11:00
Scorecard

Middlesex	v	Hampshire

Match abandoned
Radlett Cricket Club, Radlett
Umpires: Peter Hartley and Ian Ramage

- No toss.
- No play was possible due to rain.
- Points: Middlesex 1, Hampshire 1.

30 July 2021
11:00
Scorecard

Sussex; 209/7 (29 overs)	v	Kent; 50/1 (5.4 overs)
Travis Head 52 (37); Nathan Gilchrist 3/45 (6 overs)		Tawanda Muyeye 24* (12); James Coles 1/2 (0.4 overs)

No result
County Cricket Ground, Hove
Umpires: Ben Debenham and Ian Gould

- Kent won the toss and elected to field.
- The match was reduced to 29 overs per side due to rain.
- No further play was possible due to rain.
- Ali Orr (Sussex) made his List A debut.
- Points: Sussex 1, Kent 1.

==== August ====
1 August 2021
11:00
Scorecard

Kent; 158 (47.5 overs)	v	Essex; 159/1 (31.1 overs)
George Munsey 39 (62); Ryan ten Doeschate 2/7 (3 overs)		Alastair Cook 77 (90); Matt Milnes 1/29 (5 overs)

Essex won by 9 wickets
County Ground, Chelmsford
Umpires: Ian Gould and James Middlebrook

- Kent won the toss and elected to bat.
- Josh Rymell (Essex) made his List A debut.
- Points: Essex 2, Kent 0.

1 August 2021
11:00
Scorecard

Hampshire; 162 (43.1 overs)	v	Lancashire; 115/2 (25.3 overs)
Lewis McManus 45 (51); Tom Bailey 3/23 (10 overs)		Luke Wells 66 (62); John Turner 1/13 (4 overs)

Lancashire won by 51 runs (DLS method)
Rose Bowl, Southampton
Umpires: Ben Debenham and Rob White

- Lancashire won the toss and elected to field.
- No further play was possible due to rain.
- Lancashire were 51 runs ahead of the revised target of 65 runs from 25.3 overs.
- Points: Lancashire 2, Hampshire 0.

1 August 2021
11:00
Scorecard

Gloucestershire; 218/8 (42 overs)	v	Sussex; 214 (40.5 overs)
Jack Taylor 52 (60); Will Beer 2/30 (9 overs)		Ben Brown 63 (78); Tom Smith 3/28 (9 overs)

Gloucestershire won by 3 runs (DLS method)
County Cricket Ground, Hove
Umpires: Neil Bainton and Chris Watts

- Sussex won the toss and elected to field.
- Sussex were set a revised target of 218 runs from 42 overs due to rain.
- Points: Gloucestershire 2, Sussex 0.

1 August 2021
11:00
Scorecard

Middlesex; 302/5 (41 overs)	v	Worcestershire; 288/7 (41 overs)
Stephen Eskinazi 130 (101); Ed Barnard 2/54 (8 overs)		Brett D'Oliveira 74 (64); James Harris 2/46 (8 overs)

Middlesex won by 13 runs
New Road, Worcester
Umpires: Paul Pollard and Neil Pratt

- Middlesex won the toss and elected to bat.
- The match was reduced to 41 overs per side due to rain.
- Martin Andersson (Middlesex) made his List A debut.
- Points: Middlesex 2, Worcestershire 0.

3 August 2021
11:00
Scorecard

Gloucestershire; 204 (49.1 overs)	v	Essex; 207/8 (50 overs)
George Scott 64 (86); Shane Snater 4/48 (10 overs)		Tom Westley 71 (90); Graeme van Buuren 3/32 (10 overs)

Essex won by 2 wickets
County Ground, Bristol
Umpires: Ben Debenham and Neil Pratt

- Essex won the toss and elected to field.
- Points: Essex 2, Gloucestershire 0.

3 August 2021
11:00
Scorecard

Middlesex; 257 (49.3 overs)	v	Lancashire; 251 (49.2 overs)
Sam Robson 76 (81); Tom Bailey 3/33 (9 overs)		Rob Jones 72 (98); Luke Hollman 4/56 (10 overs)

Middlesex won by 6 runs
Old Trafford, Manchester
Umpires: Hassan Adnan and Nick Cook

- Middlesex won the toss and elected to bat.
- Josh de Caires (Middlesex) made his List A debut.
- Points: Middlesex 2, Lancashire 0.

4 August 2021
11:00
Scorecard

Worcestershire; 176 (39 overs)	v	Hampshire; 180/4 (39.5 overs)
Brett D'Oliveira 40 (41); Kyle Abbott 5/43 (10 overs)		Nick Gubbins 59 (69); Brett D'Oliveira 2/30 (8 overs)

Hampshire won by 6 wickets
Rose Bowl, Southampton
Umpires: Neil Mallender and Ian Ramage

- Worcestershire won the toss and elected to bat.
- Kyle Abbott (Hampshire) took his first five-wicket haul in List A cricket.
- Points: Hampshire 2, Worcestershire 0.

5 August 2021
11:00
Scorecard

Durham; 327/6 (50 overs)	v	Lancashire; 240 (44.3 overs)
Sean Dickson 103* (76); Jack Morley 2/55 (10 overs)		Rob Jones 65 (68); Luke Doneathy 4/36 (6.3 overs)

Durham won by 87 runs
Roseworth Terrace, Gosforth
Umpires: Tom Lungley and Paul Pollard

- Lancashire won the toss and elected to field.
- Taylor Cornall (Lancashire) made his List A debut.
- Sean Dickson (Durham) scored his first century in List A cricket.
- Points: Durham 2, Lancashire 0.

6 August 2021
11:00
Scorecard

Hampshire; 204/8 (37 overs)	v	Gloucestershire; 205/3 (35.3 overs)
Tom Alsop 57 (67); Graeme van Buuren 3/36 (8 overs)		Ben Charlesworth 99* (104); Tom Prest 2/28 (6 overs)

Gloucestershire won by 7 wickets
County Ground, Bristol
Umpires: Ian Gould and Mark Newell

- Hampshire won the toss and elected to bat.
- The match was reduced to 37 overs per side due to rain.
- Points: Gloucestershire 2, Hampshire 0.

6 August 2021
11:00
Scorecard

Kent; 217/9 (35 overs)	v	Middlesex; 196 (32.3 overs)
Marcus O'Riordan 60 (51); Ethan Bamber 3/41 (7 overs)		Josh de Caires 43 (40); Nathan Gilchrist 5/45 (6.3 overs)

Kent won by 21 runs
Radlett Cricket Club, Radlett
Umpires: Neil Mallender and Rob White

- Middlesex won the toss and elected to field.
- The match was reduced to 35 overs per side due to rain.
- Toby Greatwood (Middlesex) made his List A debut.
- Nathan Gilchrist (Kent) took his first five-wicket haul in List A cricket.
- Points: Kent 2, Middlesex 0.

6 August 2021
11:00
Scorecard

Worcestershire; 233/9 (50 overs)	v	Sussex; 234/8 (49.3 overs)
Jake Libby 40 (58); James Coles 3/27 (10 overs)		Ali Orr 108 (133); Jacques Banton 3/15 (4 overs)

Sussex won by 2 wickets
New Road, Worcester
Umpires: Hassan Adnan and Ben Debenham

- Worcestershire won the toss and elected to bat.
- Ali Orr (Sussex) scored his first century in List A cricket.
- Points: Sussex 2, Worcestershire 0.

8 August 2021
11:00
Scorecard

Essex; 227/6 (45 overs)	v	Durham; 233/8 (44.1 overs)
Feroze Khushi 109 (111); Jack Campbell 3/58 (9 overs)		Alex Lees 126* (132); Simon Harmer 2/34 (9 overs)

Durham won by 2 wickets
Riverside Ground, Chester-le-Street
Umpires: James Middlebrook and Paul Pollard

- Durham won the toss and elected to field.
- Durham were set a revised target of 232 runs from 45 overs due to rain.
- Luc Benkenstein and Feroze Khushi (Essex) both made their List A debuts.
- Feroze Khushi (Essex) scored his first century in List A cricket.
- Points: Durham 2, Essex 0.

8 August 2021
11:00
Scorecard

Kent; 105 (22.5 overs)	v	Hampshire; 107/4 (18.2 overs)
Ollie Robinson 27 (35); Ian Holland 4/12 (5 overs)		Tom Alsop 37 (43); Harry Podmore 2/26 (4.2 overs)

Hampshire won by 6 wickets
County Cricket Ground, Beckenham
Umpires: Billy Taylor and Chris Watts

- Hampshire won the toss and elected to field.
- The match was reduced to 24 overs per side due to rain.
- Hampshire were set a revised target of 107 runs from 24 overs due to rain.
- Joe Gordon (Kent) made his List A debut.
- Points: Hampshire 2, Kent 0.

8 August 2021
11:00
Scorecard

Lancashire	v	Worcestershire

Match abandoned
Old Trafford, Manchester
Umpires: Peter Hartley and Mark Newell

- No toss.
- No play was possible due to rain.
- Points: Lancashire 1, Worcestershire 1.

8 August 2021
11:00
Scorecard

Middlesex	v	Gloucestershire

Match cancelled
Radlett Cricket Club, Radlett

- The match was cancelled due to COVID-19.

10 August 2021
11:00
Scorecard

Essex; 321/8 (50 overs)	v	Sussex; 224 (43.2 overs)
Josh Rymell 78 (96); Will Beer 2/45 (7 overs)		Travis Head 38 (35); Ryan ten Doeschate 4/34 (9.2 overs)

Essex won by 97 runs
County Ground, Chelmsford
Umpires: Nick Cook and Ian Ramage

- Sussex won the toss and elected to field.
- Points: Essex 2, Sussex 0.

10 August 2021
11:00
Scorecard

Durham; 289/9 (50 overs)	v	Worcestershire; 243 (45.1 overs)
Alex Lees 93 (109); Ed Barnard 2/50 (9 overs)		Jake Libby 76 (88); Liam Trevaskis 3/38 (10 overs)

Durham won by 46 runs
New Road, Worcester
Umpires: Ian Blackwell and Neil Pratt

- Durham won the toss and elected to bat.
- Points: Durham 2, Worcestershire 0.

12 August 2021
11:00
Scorecard

Hampshire; 225/9 (50 overs)	v	Durham; 228/1 (40.4 overs)
Felix Organ 79 (106); Chris Rushworth 4/37 (10 overs)		Graham Clark 141* (140); James Fuller 1/26 (4 overs)

Durham won by 9 wickets
Riverside Ground, Chester-le-Street
Umpires: Hassan Adnan and Steve O'Shaughnessy

- Durham won the toss and elected to field.
- Fletcha Middleton (Hampshire) made his List A debut.
- Points: Durham 2, Hampshire 0.

12 August 2021
11:00
Scorecard

Kent; 218/9 (50 overs)	v	Gloucestershire; 219/2 (37.4 overs)
Ollie Robinson 75 (102); Graeme van Buuren 3/34 (10 overs)		Chris Dent 112* (108); James Logan 1/35 (5 overs)

Gloucestershire won by 8 wickets
County Cricket Ground, Beckenham
Umpires: Nick Cook and Ian Ramage

- Gloucestershire won the toss and elected to field.
- Ollie Price (Gloucestershire) made his List A debut.
- Points: Gloucestershire 2, Kent 0.

12 August 2021
11:00
Scorecard

Lancashire; 250/6 (50 overs)	v	Essex; 250/8 (50 overs)
Steven Croft 93 (112); Ryan ten Doeschate 2/33 (8 overs)		Alastair Cook 110 (128); Luke Wells 2/33 (8 overs)

Match tied
Old Trafford, Manchester
Umpires: Paul Baldwin and Neil Pratt

- Essex won the toss and elected to field.
- Points: Essex 1, Lancashire 1.

12 August 2021
11:00
Scorecard

Sussex; 333/4 (50 overs)	v	Middlesex; 330/8 (50 overs)
Tom Haines 123 (131); James Harris 1/68 (10 overs)		Max Holden 94 (95); Travis Head 2/35 (7 overs)

Sussex won by 3 runs
County Cricket Ground, Hove
Umpires: Ian Gould and Neil Mallender

- Sussex won the toss and elected to bat.
- Ben Brown and Tom Haines (Sussex) both scored their respective maiden centuries in List A cricket.
- Points: Sussex 2, Middlesex 0.

== Group B ==
=== Fixtures ===
==== July ====
22 July 2021
11:00
Scorecard

Warwickshire; 221 (49.2 overs)	v	Glamorgan; 225/8 (49.4 overs)
Michael Burgess 73 (91); Joe Cooke 3/35 (10 overs)		Kiran Carlson 60 (67); Jacob Bethell 4/39 (10 overs)

Glamorgan won by 2 wickets
Sophia Gardens, Cardiff
Umpires: Ben Debenham and James Middlebrook

- Warwickshire won the toss and elected to bat.
- Chris Benjamin, Jacob Bethell, Ethan Brookes, Ashish Chakrapani, George Garrett, Manraj Johal, Ryan Sidebottom, Kiel van Vollenhoven (Warwickshire), Joe Cooke, Tom Cullen, Steven Reingold and Callum Taylor (Glamorgan) all made their List A debuts.
- Points: Glamorgan 2, Warwickshire 0.

22 July 2021
11:00
Scorecard

Derbyshire; 275/7 (50 overs)	v	Leicestershire; 279/4 (46.3 overs)
Billy Godleman 116 (129); Arron Lilley 3/49 (10 overs)		Marcus Harris 75 (85); Ben Aitchison 2/51 (9 overs)

Leicestershire won by 6 wickets
Grace Road, Leicester
Umpires: Ian Gould and Richard Kettleborough

- Derbyshire won the toss and elected to bat.
- Ben Aitchison, Harry Came, Connor Marshall, Mattie McKiernan, Nils Priestley (Derbyshire), Ed Barnes and Louis Kimber (Leicestershire) all made their List A debuts.
- Points: Leicestershire 2, Derbyshire 0.

22 July 2021
11:00
Scorecard

Yorkshire; 165 (34.1 overs)	v	Surrey; 168/5 (39.1 overs)
Matt Revis 43 (43); Gus Atkinson 4/43 (10 overs)		Mark Stoneman 73* (110); Mat Pillans 4/57 (9 overs)

Surrey won by 5 wickets
North Marine Road, Scarborough
Umpires: Neil Mallender and Peter Hartley

- Surrey won the toss and elected to field.
- Harry Duke, George Hill, Matt Revis, Jack Shutt (Yorkshire), Gus Atkinson, Ben Geddes, Dan Moriarty and Nico Reifer (Surrey) all made their List A debuts.
- Points: Surrey 2, Yorkshire 0.

25 July 2021
11:00
Scorecard

Leicestershire; 327/7 (50 overs)	v	Yorkshire; 329/3 (47.5 overs)
Marcus Harris 127 (130); Matthew Waite 5/59 (8 overs)		Harry Duke 125 (130); Chris Wright 1/48 (8 overs)

Yorkshire won by 7 wickets
Grace Road, Leicester
Umpires: Ben Debenham and Nick Cook

- Leicestershire won the toss and elected to bat.
- Rehan Ahmed (Leicestershire) made his List A debut.
- Marcus Harris (Leicestershire) and Harry Duke (Yorkshire) scored their respective maiden centuries, while Matthew Waite (Yorkshire) took his first five-wicket haul in List A cricket.
- Points: Yorkshire 2, Leicestershire 0.

25 July 2021
11:00
Scorecard

Glamorgan; 295/6 (50 overs)	v	Northamptonshire; 236 (44.2 overs)
Hamish Rutherford 86 (97); Tom Taylor 2/54 (10 overs)		Tom Taylor 65* (59); Michael Hogan 3/26 (8 overs)

Glamorgan won by 59 runs
County Ground, Northampton
Umpires: James Middlebrook and Richard Kettleborough

- Northamptonshire won the toss and elected to field.
- Andy Gorvin (Glamorgan), Emilio Gay and Freddie Heldreich (Northamptonshire) made their List A debut.
- Points: Glamorgan 2, Northamptonshire 0.

25 July 2021
11:00
Scorecard

Nottinghamshire; 323 (49.4 overs)	v	Warwickshire; 237 (44 overs)
Haseeb Hameed 103 (92); Will Rhodes 3/40 (7 overs)		Rob Yates 103 (105); Liam Patterson-White 3/46 (9 overs)

Nottinghamshire won by 86 runs
Edgbaston, Birmingham
Umpires: Ian Blackwell and Neil Pratt

- Warwickshire won the toss and elected to field.
- Sol Budinger, Joey Evison, Liam Patterson-White and Dane Schadendorf (Nottinghamshire) all made their List A debuts.
- Haseeb Hameed (Nottinghamshire) scored his first century in List A cricket.
- Points: Nottinghamshire 2, Warwickshire 0.

25 July 2021
14:00 (D/N)
Scorecard

Derbyshire; 298 (49.3 overs)	v	Somerset; 299/4 (48 overs)
Fynn Hudson-Prentice 93 (87); Sonny Baker 3/46 (10 overs)		James Hildreth 110 (109); Alex Thomson 2/48 (10 overs)

Somerset won by 6 wickets
County Ground, Taunton
Umpires: Richard Illingworth and Rob White

- Somerset won the toss and elected to field.
- Kasey Aldridge, Sonny Baker, Eddie Byrom, Lewis Goldsworthy and Sam Young (Somerset) all made their List A debuts.
- Points: Somerset 2, Derbyshire 0.

27 July 2021
11:00
Scorecard

Derbyshire; 200/9 (42 overs)	v	Warwickshire; 207/2 (37 overs)
Fynn Hudson-Prentice 51 (57); Jacob Bethell 3/32 (9 overs)		Ed Pollock 103* (115); Fynn Hudson-Prentice 1/29 (5 overs)

Warwickshire won by 8 wickets (DLS method)
County Ground, Derby
Umpires: Neil Mallender and Paul Pollard

- Warwickshire won the toss and elected to field.
- Warwickshire were set a revised target of 205 runs from 42 overs due to rain.
- Jordan Bulpitt (Warwickshire) made his List A debut.
- Ed Pollock (Warwickshire) scored his first century in List A cricket.
- Points: Warwickshire 2, Derbyshire 0.

27 July 2021
11:00
Scorecard

Surrey; 311/8 (30 overs)	v	Nottinghamshire; 266/7 (30 overs)
Ryan Patel 131 (70); Brett Hutton 2/27 (6 overs)		Ben Slater 69 (48); Conor McKerr 3/41 (6 overs)

Surrey won by 33 runs (DLS method)
Woodbridge Road, Guildford
Umpires: Ben Debenham and Chris Watts

- Nottinghamshire won the toss and elected to field.
- Nottinghamshire were set a revised target of 300 runs from 30 overs due to rain.
- Ryan Patel (Surrey) scored his first century in List A cricket.
- Points: Surrey 2, Nottinghamshire 0.

28 July 2021
11:00
Scorecard

Somerset; 180/7 (37 overs)	v	Glamorgan; 179/9 (37 overs)
Ben Green 87 (72); Michael Hogan 4/33 (8 overs)		Billy Root 37 (51); Kasey Aldridge 3/39 (8 overs)

Somerset won by 1 run
County Ground, Taunton
Umpires: Ian Ramage and Russell Warren

- Glamorgan won the toss and elected to field.
- The match was reduced to 37 overs per side due to rain.
- Points: Somerset 2, Glamorgan 0.

28 July 2021
11:00
Scorecard

Yorkshire; 222 (49.3 overs)	v	Northamptonshire; 2/0 (0.2 overs)
Will Luxton 68 (85); Jack White 3/38 (10 overs)		Emilio Gay 1* (1)

No result
North Marine Road, Scarborough
Umpires: Steve O'Shaughnessy and Neil Pratt

- Northamptonshire won the toss and elected to field.
- No further play was possible due to rain.
- Jack White (Northamptonshire) and Will Luxton (Yorkshire) both made their List A debuts.
- Points: Northamptonshire 1, Yorkshire 1.

29 July 2021
11:00
Scorecard

Warwickshire; 303/6 (50 overs)	v	Leicestershire; 296/9 (50 overs)
Matt Lamb 119* (105); George Rhodes 2/54 (10 overs)		Rishi Patel 118 (107); Will Rhodes 3/49 (10 overs)

Warwickshire won by 7 runs
Edgbaston, Birmingham
Umpires: Nick Cook and Mark Newell

- Warwickshire won the toss and elected to bat.
- Matt Lamb (Warwickshire) and Rishi Patel (Leicestershire) both scored their respective maiden centuries in List A cricket.
- Points: Warwickshire 2, Leicestershire 0.

30 July 2021
11:00
Scorecard

Glamorgan	v	Derbyshire

No result
County Ground, Derby
Umpires: Graham Lloyd and Neil Pratt

- Derbyshire won the toss and elected to field.
- No play was possible due to rain.
- Mitch Wagstaff (Derbyshire) made his List A debut.
- Points: Derbyshire 1, Glamorgan 1.

30 July 2021
11:00
Scorecard

Nottinghamshire; 92/2 (21 overs)	v	Somerset
Ben Slater 42* (57); Ben Green 1/18 (4 overs)

No result
John Fretwell Sporting Complex, Nettleworth
Umpires: Richard Kettleborough and Tom Lungley

- Somerset won the toss and elected to field.
- No further play was possible due to rain.
- Ned Leonard (Somerset) made his List A debut.
- Points: Nottinghamshire 1, Somerset 1.

30 July 2021
11:00
Scorecard

Northamptonshire; 31/1 (5.3 overs)	v	Surrey
Ricardo Vasconcelos 17 (16); Conor McKerr 1/1 (1 over)

No result
The Oval, London
Umpires: Ian Blackwell and James Middlebrook

- Surrey won the toss and elected to field.
- No further play was possible due to rain.
- Nick Kimber (Surrey) made his List A debut.
- Points: Northamptonshire 1, Surrey 1.

==== August ====
1 August 2021
11:00
Scorecard

Derbyshire; 177/9 (28 overs)	v	Northamptonshire; 183/2 (27.3 overs)
Fynn Hudson-Prentice 64 (43); Jack White 4/20 (6 overs)		Emilio Gay 84* (73); Tom Wood 1/37 (6 overs)

Northamptonshire won by 8 wickets
County Ground, Northampton
Umpires: Nick Cook and Tom Lungley

- Northamptonshire won the toss and elected to field.
- The match was reduced to 28 overs per side due to rain.
- Points: Northamptonshire 2, Derbyshire 0.

1 August 2021
11:00
Scorecard

Leicestershire; 144 (43.1 overs)	v	Nottinghamshire; 145/3 (20.1 overs)
Rehan Ahmed 35 (69); Luke Fletcher 4/30 (10 overs)		Peter Trego 39 (31); Ed Barnes 1/19 (4 overs)

Nottinghamshire won by 7 wickets
John Fretwell Sporting Complex, Nettleworth
Umpires: Ian Blackwell and Ian Ramage

- Nottinghamshire won the toss and elected to field.
- Points: Nottinghamshire 2, Leicestershire 0.

1 August 2021
11:00
Scorecard

Yorkshire; 158/5 (20 overs)	v	Somerset; 159/5 (19.1 overs)
Matt Revis 58* (41); Kasey Aldridge 2/46 (4 overs)		James Hildreth 61* (34); Matthew Waite 2/19 (3.1 overs)

Somerset won by 5 wickets
County Ground, Taunton
Umpires: Mike Burns and Billy Taylor

- Somerset won the toss and elected to field.
- The match was reduced to 20 overs per side due to rain.
- James Rew (Somerset) made his List A debut.
- Points: Somerset 2, Yorkshire 0.

3 August 2021
11:00
Scorecard

Surrey; 132 (44.1 overs)	v	Glamorgan; 133/5 (26.5 overs)
Rikki Clarke 35 (62); Andrew Salter 3/37 (10 overs)		Hamish Rutherford 58 (52); Dan Moriarty 2/25 (9.5 overs)

Glamorgan won by 5 wickets
Sophia Gardens, Cardiff
Umpires: Ian Blackwell and Mark Newell

- Surrey won the toss and elected to bat.
- Points: Glamorgan 2, Surrey 0.

3 August 2021
11:00
Scorecard

Yorkshire; 320/7 (50 overs)	v	Warwickshire; 281 (47.2 overs)
Jonny Tattersall 70 (67); George Garrett 2/24 (7 overs)		Jacob Bethell 66 (41); Ben Coad 3/30 (9.2 overs)

Yorkshire won by 39 runs
Clifton Park Ground, York
Umpires: Tom Lungley and Paul Pollard

- Warwickshire won the toss and elected to field.
- Dan Mousley (Warwickshire) made his List A debut.
- Points: Yorkshire 2, Warwickshire 0.

4 August 2021
11:00
Scorecard

Derbyshire; 258/6 (27 overs)	v	Nottinghamshire; 217 (27 overs)
Tom Wood 109 (59); Liam Patterson-White 3/41 (5 overs)		Brett Hutton 46 (20); Fynn Hudson-Prentice 3/37 (6 overs)

Derbyshire won by 41 runs
County Ground, Derby
Umpires: Billy Taylor and James Middlebrook

- Nottinghamshire won the toss and elected to field.
- The match was reduced to 27 overs per side due to rain.
- George Scrimshaw (Derbyshire) made his List A debut.
- Tom Wood (Derbyshire) scored his first century in List A cricket.
- Points: Derbyshire 2, Nottinghamshire 0.

5 August 2021
11:00
Scorecard

Glamorgan; 277/8 (50 overs)	v	Leicestershire; 0/0 (1 over)
Nick Selman 140 (144); George Rhodes 3/44 (8 overs)

No result
Grace Road, Leicester
Umpires: Paul Baldwin and Nick Cook

- Leicestershire won the toss and elected to field.
- Leicestershire were set a revised target of 257 runs from 43 overs due to rain.
- No further play was possible due to rain.
- Nick Selman (Glamorgan) scored his first century in List A cricket.
- Points: Glamorgan 1, Leicestershire 1.

5 August 2021
11:00
Scorecard

Somerset; 220 (48.3 overs)	v	Surrey; 66/0 (8 overs)
Lewis Goldsworthy 96 (105); Dan Moriarty 4/30 (10 overs)		Ben Geddes 31* (25)

No result
The Oval, London
Umpires: Mike Burns and Graham Lloyd

- Somerset won the toss and elected to bat.
- Surrey were set a revised target of 147 runs from 25 overs due to rain.
- No further play was possible due to rain.
- Points: Somerset 1, Surrey 1.

6 August 2021
11:00
Scorecard

Warwickshire; 278/6 (46 overs)	v	Northamptonshire; 144 (33.4 overs)
Michael Burgess 73 (87); Rob Keogh 2/35 (6 overs)		Tom Taylor 57* (65); Ethan Brookes 3/15 (4.4 overs)

Warwickshire won by 134 runs
Edgbaston, Birmingham
Umpires: Ian Blackwell and Ian Ramage

- Northamptonshire won the toss and elected to field.
- The match was reduced to 46 overs per side due to rain.
- Points: Warwickshire 2, Northamptonshire 0.

6 August 2021
11:00
Scorecard

Nottinghamshire; 185/5 (33 overs)	v	Yorkshire
Ben Slater 74 (83); Mat Pillans 4/26 (6 overs)

No result
Clifton Park Ground, York
Umpires: James Middlebrook and Russell Warren

- Yorkshire won the toss and elected to field.
- The match was reduced to 41 overs per side due to rain.
- No further play was possible due to rain.
- Josh Sullivan (Yorkshire) and Fateh Singh (Nottinghamshire) both made their List A debuts.
- Points: Nottinghamshire 1, Yorkshire 1.

7 August 2021
11:00
Scorecard

Leicestershire; 253/9 (50 overs)	v	Surrey; 225 (38.5 overs)
Harry Swindells 75 (96); Cameron Steel 4/33 (10 overs)		Rikki Clarke 82 (84); Ben Mike 3/34 (5.5 overs)

Leicestershire won by 1 run (DLS method)
Grace Road, Leicester
Umpires: Steve O'Shaughnessy and Neil Pratt

- Surrey won the toss and elected to field.
- Surrey were set a revised target of 227 runs from 39 overs due to rain.
- Points: Leicestershire 2, Surrey 0.

8 August 2021
11:00
Scorecard

Nottinghamshire; 73 (20.2 overs)	v	Glamorgan; 76/2 (16 overs)
Fateh Singh 21 (19); James Weighell 3/7 (4.2 overs)		Nick Selman 37* (47); Dane Paterson 1/5 (2 overs)

Glamorgan won by 8 wickets
Sophia Gardens, Cardiff
Umpires: Ian Gould and Neil Mallender

- Glamorgan won the toss and elected to field.
- The match was reduced to 23 overs per side due to rain.
- Sam King (Nottinghamshire) made his List A debut.
- Sam King replaced Lyndon James for Nottinghamshire during the 1st innings as a concussion substitute.
- Points: Glamorgan 2, Nottinghamshire 0.

8 August 2021
11:00
Scorecard

Northamptonshire; 305/6 (46 overs)	v	Somerset; 223 (40.5 overs)
Ben Curran 94 (93); Josh Davey 2/42 (10 overs)		Lewis Goldsworthy 80 (61); Simon Kerrigan 4/48 (8.5 overs)

Northamptonshire won by 81 runs (DLS method)
County Ground, Northampton
Umpires: Ian Ramage and Neil Bainton

- Somerset won the toss and elected to field.
- The match was reduced to 46 overs per side due to rain.
- Somerset were set a revised target of 305 runs from 46 overs due to rain.
- James Sales (Northamptonshire) made his List A debut.
- Points: Northamptonshire 2, Somerset 0.

8 August 2021
11:00
Scorecard

Derbyshire; 108/6 (10 overs)	v	Yorkshire; 109/2 (8.4 overs)
Fynn Hudson-Prentice 38* (17); Josh Sullivan 4/11 (2 overs)		Will Fraine 69* (32); Ravi Rampaul 1/15 (2 overs)

Yorkshire won by 8 wickets
Queen's Park, Chesterfield
Umpires: Hassan Adnan and Ben Debenham

- Yorkshire won the toss and elected to field.
- The match was reduced to 10 overs per side due to rain.
- Points: Yorkshire 2, Derbyshire 0.

10 August 2021
11:00
Scorecard

Northamptonshire; 210 (49.5 overs)	v	Nottinghamshire; 211/8 (49.4 overs)
Luke Procter 44 (72); Liam Patterson-White 5/19 (10 overs)		Ben Compton 71 (101); Tom Taylor 3/24 (6 overs)

Nottinghamshire won by 2 wickets
Gorse Lane, Grantham
Umpires: Mark Newell and Paul Pollard

- Northamptonshire won the toss and elected to bat.
- Ben Compton (Nottinghamshire) made his List A debut.
- Points: Nottinghamshire 2, Northamptonshire 0.

10 August 2021
11:00
Scorecard

Somerset; 326/7 (50 overs)	v	Leicestershire; 327/6 (44.4 overs)
George Bartlett 108 (89); Ben Mike 3/75 (10 overs)		Lewis Hill 107 (106); Sonny Baker 2/46 (8.4 overs)

Leicestershire won by 4 wickets
County Ground, Taunton
Umpires: Ben Debenham and Tom Lungley

- Leicestershire won the toss and elected to field.
- George Thomas (Somerset) made his List A debut.
- Points: Leicestershire 2, Somerset 0.

10 August 2021
11:00
Scorecard

Warwickshire; 268/9 (50 overs)	v	Surrey; 269/3 (39.4 overs)
Craig Miles 31* (31); Cameron Steel 4/39 (10 overs)		Tim David 140* (70); Rob Yates 1/27 (8.4 overs)

Surrey won by 7 wickets
The Oval, London
Umpires: Neil Mallender and Billy Taylor

- Warwickshire won the toss and elected to bat.
- Tim David (Surrey) scored his first century in List A cricket.
- Points: Surrey 2, Warwickshire 0.

12 August 2021
11:00
Scorecard

Derbyshire; 215 (46.2 overs)	v	Surrey; 219/2 (37 overs)
Mattie McKiernan 38 (30); Conor McKerr 3/43 (6.2 overs)		Ryan Patel 111* (116); Tom Wood 1/13 (3 overs)

Surrey won by 2 wickets
County Ground, Derby
Umpires: Mike Burns and Paul Pollard

- Derbyshire won the toss and elected to bat.
- Points: Surrey 2, Derbyshire 0.

12 August 2021
11:00
Scorecard

Yorkshire; 230 (48.5 overs)	v	Glamorgan; 226/8 (50 overs)
Jonny Tattersall 53 (62); James Weighell 3/55 (9.5 overs)		Nick Selman 92 (128); George Hill 3/49 (10 overs)

Yorkshire won by 4 runs
Sophia Gardens, Cardiff
Umpires: Ian Blackwell and Tom Lungley

- Glamorgan won the toss and elected to field.
- Points: Yorkshire 2, Glamorgan 0.

12 August 2021
11:00
Scorecard

Leicestershire; 271 (50 overs)	v	Northamptonshire; 261/9 (48 overs)
Louis Kimber 63 (68); Ben Sanderson 3/30 (7 overs)		Rob Keogh 52 (61); Ben Mike 2/24 (4 overs)

Leicestershire won by 4 runs (DLS method)
County Ground, Northampton
Umpires: Billy Taylor and Chris Watts

- Leicestershire won the toss and elected to bat.
- Northamptonshire were set a revised target of 266 runs from 48 overs due to rain.
- Points: Leicestershire 2, Northamptonshire 0.

12 August 2021
11:00
Scorecard

Somerset; 287/8 (50 overs)	v	Warwickshire; 289/7 (49 overs)
Lewis Goldsworthy 79 (93); Matt Lamb 4/35 (5 overs)		Matt Lamb 92 (103); Josh Davey 4/57 (10 overs)

Warwickshire won by 3 wickets
Edgbaston, Birmingham
Umpires: Ben Debenham and James Middlebrook

- Somerset won the toss and elected to bat.
- Points: Warwickshire 2, Somerset 0.

== Standings ==
=== Group A ===
Pos	Team	Pld	W	L	T	NR	Ded	Pts	NRR
1	Durham	8	6	1	0	1	0	13	0.921
2	Essex	8	5	2	1	0	0	11	0.238
3	Gloucestershire	7	4	3	0	0	0	8	0.094
4	Lancashire	8	3	2	1	2	0	9	0.014
5	Worcestershire	8	3	4	0	1	0	7	0.256
6	Hampshire	8	3	4	0	1	0	7	0.161
7	Sussex	8	2	4	0	2	0	6	−0.689
8	Middlesex (Note: Middlesex's match against Gloucestershire (8 August) was cancelled due to COVID-19. As a result, the Group A qualifications were decided on an average points per completed match basis.)	7	2	4	0	1	0	5	−0.286
9	Kent	8	1	5	0	2	0	4	−1.258

Updated to match(es) played on completed. Source: BBC Sport, ECB, ESPNcricinfo.
Notes:
- advanced directly to the semi-finals
- advanced to the quarter-finals

=== Group B ===
Pos	Team	Pld	W	L	T	NR	Ded	Pts	NRR
1	Glamorgan	8	4	2	0	2	0	10	0.818
2	Surrey	8	4	2	0	2	0	10	0.409
3	Yorkshire	8	4	2	0	2	0	10	−0.024
4	Leicestershire	8	4	3	0	1	0	9	−0.428
5	Nottinghamshire	8	3	3	0	2	0	8	0.686
6	Warwickshire	8	4	4	0	0	0	8	−0.025
7	Somerset	8	3	3	0	2	0	8	−0.412
8	Northamptonshire	8	2	4	0	2	0	6	−0.412
9	Derbyshire	8	1	6	0	1	0	3	−0.558

Updated to match(es) played on completed. Source: BBC Sport, ECB, ESPNcricinfo.
- advanced directly to the semi-finals
- advanced to the quarter-finals

== Knockout stage ==
The winner of each group progressed directly to the semi-finals. The second and third placed teams in each group then played a play-off match against a team from the other group. The winners of those matches then played one of the group winners in the semi-finals.

Quarter-finals
A2	Essex	317/7
B3	Yorkshire	188
B2	Surrey	246/5
A3	Gloucestershire	242/7

Semi-finals
B1	Glamorgan	293/5
QF1	Essex	289
A1	Durham	281/5
QF2	Surrey	280/8

Final
SF1	Glamorgan	296/9
SF2	Durham	238

=== Quarter-finals ===
14 August 2021
11:00
Scorecard

Essex; 317/7 (50 overs)	v	Yorkshire; 188 (38.4 overs)
Josh Rymell 121 (130); George Hill 3/51 (10 overs)		Matt Revis 42 (38); Tom Westley 3/33 (6 overs)

Essex won by 129 runs
County Cricket Ground, Chelmsford
Umpires: Mike Burns and Billy Taylor

- Essex won the toss and elected to bat.
- Josh Rymell (Essex) scored his first century in List A cricket.

15 August 2021
11:00
Scorecard

Gloucestershire; 242/7 (50 overs)	v	Surrey; 246/5 (42.4 overs)
George Scott 66* (67); Dan Moriarty 2/30 (10 overs)		Tim David 102 (73); Matthew Taylor 1/36 (8 overs)

Surrey won by 5 wickets
The Oval, London
Umpires: Ian Blackwell and Paul Pollard

- Surrey won the toss and elected to field.

=== Semi-finals ===
16 August 2021
11:00
Scorecard

Essex; 289 (49.4 overs)	v	Glamorgan; 293/5 (48 overs)
Alastair Cook 68 (66); Joe Cooke 5/61 (9.4 overs)		Hamish Rutherford 67 (44); Tom Westley 2/41 (10 overs)

Glamorgan won by 5 wickets
Sophia Gardens, Cardiff
Umpires: Mike Burns and Ian Gould

- Glamorgan won the toss and elected to field.
- Joe Cooke (Glamorgan) took his first five-wicket haul in List A cricket.

17 August 2021
11:00
Scorecard

Surrey; 280/8 (50 overs)	v	Durham; 281/5 (47.3 overs)
Mark Stoneman 117 (134); Chris Rushworth 3/49 (10 overs)		Alex Lees 75 (99); Matt Dunn 2/49 (7 overs)

Durham won by 5 wickets
Riverside Ground, Chester-le-Street
Umpires: Peter Hartley and Graham Lloyd

- Durham won the toss and elected to field.

== Final ==
19 August 2021
13:00 (D/N)
Scorecard

Glamorgan; 296/9 (50 overs)	v	Durham; 238 (45.1 overs)
Kiran Carlson 82 (59); Matty Potts 3/55 (10 overs)		Sean Dickson 84* (83); Andrew Salter 3/42 (10 overs)

Glamorgan won by 58 runs
Trent Bridge, Nottingham
Umpires: Neil Mallender and Steve O'Shaughnessy

- Durham won the toss and elected to field.
