= Luke Pilkington =

Australian soccer player

Personal information
- Full name: Luke Thomas Pilkington
- Date of birth: 12 July 1990 (age 36)
- Place of birth: Wanniassa, A.C.T., Australia
- Height: 1.81 m (5 ft 11 in)
- Positions: Left back; left winger

Youth career
- ANU FC
- 2009–2011: Melbourne Victory

Senior career*
Years	Team	Apps	(Gls)
2009–2011	Melbourne Victory	3	(0)
2011	VTC Football	8	(0)
2011–2017	Bentleigh Greens	133	(5)
2018–2020	Dandenong City	51	(8)
2021–2022	Canberra Croatia	31	(3)
- * Club domestic league appearances and goals as of 12 August 2024

Luke Pilkington (born 12 July 1990 in Canberra, Australia) is an Australian footballer who won the Foxtel reality television show Football Superstar.

== Club career ==
Pilkington was previously the captain of Australian National University Football Club. As a result of his victory on Football Superstar, Luke was awarded a contract with A-League franchise, Melbourne Victory F.C. He was also awarded a scholarship with Monash University, one of Australia's premier sporting universities. Pilkington made his first team debut for Melbourne Victory on 27 December 2009 in an A League match against North Queensland Fury, he has also been a regular fixture in their youth side. He also came on as a substitute in an Asian Champions League match in April 2010.
