= Calum O'Connell =

Australian soccer player

Personal information
- Full name: Calum O'Connell
- Date of birth: 2 May 1990 (age 36)
- Place of birth: Perth, Western Australia
- Height: 1.86 m (6 ft 1 in)
- Position: Left back

Team information
- Current team: Olympic Kingsway

Youth career
- 2001–2006: Perth Juniors

Senior career*
Years	Team	Apps	(Gls)
2007	ECU Joondalup	2	(0)
2008	Sorrento FC	8	(0)
2009	Brisbane Wolves	26	(2)
2009–2010	Brisbane Roar	4	(0)
2011	Floreat Athena	22	(5)
2012	Western Knights	10	(2)
2013–2014	Sydney United	30	(0)
2015	Perth SC	4	(0)
2016	Inglewood United	24	(6)
2017–2021	Balcatta	106	(19)
2022–	Olympic Kingsway	41	(2)

International career^{‡}
	Australian Schoolboys	7	(1)
- * Club domestic league appearances and goals as of 23 November 2023 ‡ National team caps and goals as of 11:55, 18 October 2009 (UTC)

Calum O'Connell (born 2 May 1990 in Perth, Western Australia) is an Australian footballer who plays for Kingsway.

== Club career ==
O'Connell was a contestant on the First Season of the 2008 FOX8 television series Football Superstar. He made it to the top 10 of the competition, but lost out to eventual winner Adam Hett who won a youth contract with Sydney FC.

On 20 September 2009 he made his professional senior debut in a 4–2 loss against Perth Glory.

== Business ==
O'Connell in his spare time has built his own Activewear label called "Fearless Activewear" which started in 2015.
