= Tom Banton =

English cricketer (born 1998)

Personal information
- Full name: Thomas Banton
- Born: 11 November 1998 (age 28); Chiltern, Buckinghamshire, England
- Batting: Right-handed
- Bowling: Right-arm off break
- Role: Batsman
- Relatives: Colin Banton (father); Jacques Banton (brother)

International information
- National side: England (2019–present)
- ODI debut (cap 255): 4 February 2020 v South Africa
- Last ODI: 18 November 2026 v Australia
- T20I debut (cap 90): 5 November 2019 v New Zealand
- Last T20I: 21 November 2026 v Australia

Domestic team information
- Years: Team
- 2017–present: Somerset
- 2019/20, 2024/25: Brisbane Heat
- 2020: Peshawar Zalmi
- 2020: Kolkata Knight Riders
- 2021: Quetta Gladiators
- 2021–2022: Welsh Fire
- 2021: Colombo Stars
- 2023: Northern Superchargers
- 2024: Dubai Capitals
- 2024: Fortune Barishal
- 2024–2026: Trent Rockets
- 2025/26: MI Emirates
- 2026: Gujarat Titans

Career statistics
Competition	ODI	T20I	FC	T20
Matches	17	44	52	242
Runs scored	756	836	2,758	5,915
Batting average	47.25	26.96	34.47	27.90
100s/50s	2/5	0/5	4/14	4/33
Top score	126	73	371	107*
Catches/stumpings	11/–	31/0	29/0	143/10
- Source: ESPNcricinfo, 21 November 2026

Thomas Banton (born 11 November 1998) is an English cricketer who plays for the England cricket team in One Day International (ODI) and Twenty20 International (T20I) formats of the game. He made his international debut for England in November 2019.

== Domestic and franchise career ==
Banton made his Twenty20 cricket debut for Somerset in the 2017 NatWest t20 Blast on 16 July 2017. He made his first-class debut for Somerset in the 2018 County Championship on 18 September 2018. In 2019, he became a regular in all three formats, scoring two centuries in Somerset's victorious Royal London One-Day Cup campaign as well as a maiden T20 century against Kent in the Vitality Blast.

Banton was signed by Brisbane Heat in the Australian Big Bash League for the 2019/20 season. In December 2019, he was drafted by Pakistan Super League (PSL) franchise team Peshawar Zalmi as their Diamond Category pick at the 2020 PSL draft. Later the same month, in the 2020 IPL auction, he was bought by the Kolkata Knight Riders ahead of the 2020 Indian Premier League. Banton was set to play for the Brisbane Heat in the 2020–21 Big Bash League, but pulled out of the tournament on 5 December 2020.

In April 2022, he was bought by the Welsh Fire for the 2022 season of The Hundred. In July 2022, in the County Championship match against Essex, Banton scored his maiden century in first-class cricket.

Banton signed a two-year contract extension with Somerset in September 2024.

He made his maiden first-class triple century and the highest individual first-class score by a Somerset player when he compiled 371 against Worcestershire in the opening round of the 2025 County Championship.

Ahead of 2026 Indian Premier League, Banton was acquired by Gujarat Titans. On 17 April 2026, Banton was ruled out of the remainder of the IPL season with a finger injury, having not featured in a game during the season.

In June 2026, Banton signed a new white-ball only contract with Somerset tying him into the club until at least the end of the 2028 season.

== International career ==
In December 2017, he was named in England's squad for the 2018 ICC Under-19 Cricket World Cup.

In September 2019, Banton was named in England's Twenty20 International (T20I) squad for their series against New Zealand. He made his T20I debut for England, against New Zealand, on 5 November 2019. The following month, Banton was named in England's One Day International (ODI) squad for their series against South Africa. He made his ODI debut on 4 February 2020, for England against South Africa.

On 29 May 2020, Banton was named in a 55-man group of players to begin training ahead of international fixtures starting in England following the COVID-19 pandemic. On 9 July 2020, Banton was included in England's 24-man squad to start training behind closed doors for the ODI series against Ireland. On 27 July 2020, Banton was named in England's squad for the ODI series.

Banton was recalled for England to play the T20I series against the West Indies in 2025.

On 27 September, 2026, during the 3rd ODI against Sri Lanka, Banton hit his maiden one day and international century for England, hitting 126 runs of 105 balls, as the team posted 355/7.

== International Centuries ==
=== One Day International Centuries ===
No.	Runs	Balls	Opponent	Venue	Date	Result
1	126*	105	Sri Lanka	The Oval, London	27 September 2026	Won
2	121	99	Australia	Adelaide Oval, Adelaide	15 November 2026	Won
