= Jack Davies (cricketer, born 2000) =

English cricketer (born 2000)

Personal information
- Full name: Jack Leo Benjamin Davies
- Born: 30 March 2000 (age 26); Reading, Berkshire, England
- Batting: Left-handed
- Role: Wicketkeeper-batsman

Domestic team information
- Years: Team
- 2020–2026: Middlesex (squad no. 23)
- First-class debut: 22 August 2020 Middlesex v Sussex
- List A debut: 25 July 2021 Middlesex v Essex

Career statistics
Competition	FC	LA	T20
Matches	32	27	44
Runs scored	1,016	602	681
Batting average	22.57	24.08	19.45
100s/50s	0/7	0/4	0/2
Top score	91	70	53
Catches/stumpings	52/0	12/4	12/8
- Source: ESPNcricinfo, 18 August 2026

Jack Leo Benjamin Davies (born 30 March 2000) is an English former professional cricketer. He made his first-class debut on 15 August 2020, for Middlesex in the 2020 Bob Willis Trophy. Prior to his first-class debut, he was named in England's squad for the 2018 Under-19 Cricket World Cup. He made his Twenty20 debut on 5 September 2020, for Middlesex in the 2020 t20 Blast. He made his List A debut on 25 July 2021, for Middlesex in the 2021 Royal London One-Day Cup. Davies announced his retirement from professional cricket on 18 August 2026.
