= Football Superstar =

Australian television series (2008–2010)

- Genre: Reality
- Developed by: North One Television Australia
- Presented by: Lee Furlong (season 2–3); Kris Smith (season 3); Brian McFadden (season 1–2); Amy Taylor (season 1)
- Judges: Ange Postecoglou; Steve O'Connor; Nik Hagicostas; Vitale Ferrante
- Country of origin: Australia
- No. of seasons: 3
- No. of episodes: 24

Original release
- Network: Fox8
- Release: 19 June 2008 – 22 July 2010

Related
- Cricket Superstar

Football Superstar is an Australian reality television series that aired on FOX8. It was hosted by Lee Furlong and Brian McFadden, with Kris Smith replacing McFadden in the third season. The show aimed to find a new football (soccer) star from male contestants aged 16 to 21. In its three seasons, the winners were Adam Hett, Luke Pilkington and Liam McCormick.

== Season One (2008) ==
The first series aired between 19 June 2008 and 7 August 2008, and had an initial first-season run of 8 episodes. The series was hosted by Brian McFadden with former Australian Women's player Amy Taylor co-hosting. The winner was Adam Hett from Perth who beat out Evan Christodoulou in the final. Hett scored a contract under Australian association football club, Sydney FC. He started playing immediately for Sydney FC in the 2008–2009 season of the new 8 team A-League National Youth League. The team was coached by Steve O'Connor. Hett also won a one-year sports scholarship with Macquarie University. The series was co-funded by Kellogg's Nutri-Grain and FOXTEL at the instigation of Mindshare Australia's Adam Ross.

=== Contestants ===
(Ages stated are at commencement of airing)

==== Eliminated ====
- Aleksander Milisavljevic, 17, Sydney
- Oscar Sanchez, 17, Adelaide, South Australia
- Christopher Roulston, 17, Brisbane, Queensland
- Rhys Giovenali, 17, Sydney
- Tom Cullen, 16, Perth, Western Australia
- Carlo Coelho, 17, Perth, Western Australia
- William Dixon, 18, Melbourne
- Alexander Sopina, 18, Sydney
- Calum O'Connell, 19, Perth, Western Australia
- Zachary Tung, 19, Brisbane, Queensland
- David Price, 19, Perth, Western Australia
- Corey Slevin, 19, Brisbane, Queensland

==== Finalists ====
- Reno Damianou, 19, Melbourne
- Evan Christodoulou, 17, Melbourne

==== Winner ====
- Adam Hett, 17, Sydney, NSW

== Season Two (2009) ==
In March 2009 a second series was announced. The winner of the contract to Melbourne Victory was Luke Pilkington. The producers were offering, as a major prize open to any permanent resident of Australia aged between 16 and 20 years of age, a contract with the Melbourne Victory organisation for season 5 of the A-League. Lee Furlong co-hosted with Brian McFadden.

Trial days were held in all mainland state capitals beginning on 22 March in Perth and ending in Melbourne on 19 April. Intending trialists had to submit an audition form and a short video before being invited to attend the one-day trials.

Ten players were selected on merit from each of the trials and invited to attend an intensive training camp in Melbourne over a weekend in late April. Fifteen players from the weekend camp were then selected for an all expenses paid month long training camp under the supervision of Melbourne Victory staff as well as play competitive matches against local teams whilst living as a group in a house in Melbourne.

As with the 2008 series the hopeful participants where culled from the groups at each level using both objective and subjective criteria.

=== Contestants ===
(Ages stated are at commencement of airing)

==== Eliminated ====
- Kynon Melling, 18, Perth, Western Australia
- Michael Marchi, 20, Adelaide, South Australia
- Thomas Renzi, 19, Mount Gambier, South Australia
- Daniel Mitwali, 17, Sydney
- John Lazaridis, 20, Melbourne
- Tom Cullen, 16, Perth, Western Australia
- Trent Wood, 19, Perth, Western Australia
- Matthew Heath, 19, Brisbane, Queensland
- Gilly Buckley, 20, Sydney
- Sebastian Petralito, 20, Brisbane, Queensland
- Steven Topalovic, 18, Melbourne
- David McMurray, 19, Sydney

==== Finalists ====
- Chris Kozionas, 20, Brisbane, Queensland
- Jack Petrie, 20, Brisbane, Queensland

==== Winner ====
- Luke Pilkington, 19, Canberra, ACT

== Season Three (2010) ==
Foxtel confirmed a third season of the show during the Melbourne Victory vs Sydney FC game on 7 March 2010. The Major Prize was a contract with Brisbane Roar. Auditions started in late March. The show returned in June with Furlong co hosting with Kris Smith, a former rugby player, model and partner of Dannii Minogue. Roar manager Ange Postecoglou was head coach. The winner of the Brisbane Roar contract was Liam McCormick.

=== Eliminated ===
(Ages stated are at commencement of airing)

- Jeremy Walker, 16, Taroona, Tasmania (Episode 3)
- Nicholas Krousoratis, 16, Templestowe, Victoria (Episode 3)
- Phillipe Bernabo-Madrid, 18, Mawson, Australian Capital Territory (Episode 4)
- Jesse Fuller, 19, Bunbury, Western Australia (Episode 4)
- Ahmed Yakoub, 19, Modbury, South Australia (Episode 4)
- Alessandro Stazio, 18, Sandringham, Victoria (Episode 5)
- Jesse McDonnell, 17, Lennox Head, New South Wales (Episode 5)
- Jared Austin, 19, Albany Creek, Queensland (Episode 6)
- Ian Kamau, 18, Magill, South Australia (Episode 6)
- Elias Tsintzas, 19, Northcote, Victoria (Episode 6)
- Julian Zullo, 19, West End, Queensland (Episode 7)
- Troy Ruthven, 19, Menai, New South Wales (Episode 7)

=== Finalists ===
- Devon Gibson, 18, Casuarina, Western Australia
- Aaron Turner, 18, Elizabeth Grove, South Australia

=== Winner ===
- Liam McCormick, 18

== See also ==
- List of Australian television series
