= Les Lenham =

English cricketer

Personal information
- Full name: Leslie John Lenham
- Born: 24 May 1936 (age 90); Worthing, Sussex, England
- Batting: Right-handed
- Bowling: Right-arm off-spin
- Relatives: Neil Lenham (son); Archie Lenham (grandson)

Domestic team information
- Years: Team
- 1956–1970: Sussex

Career statistics
Competition	First-class	List A
Matches	300	23
Runs scored	12,796	396
Batting average	26.16	19.80
100s/50s	7/66	0/1
Top score	191*	70
Balls bowled	562	0
Wickets	6	–
Bowling average	51.80	–
5 wickets in innings	0	–
10 wickets in match	0	n/a
Best bowling	2/24	–
Catches/stumpings	110/–	4/–
- Source: Cricinfo, 15 January 2014

Leslie John Lenham (born 24 May 1936) is an English former cricketer who played first-class cricket for Sussex from 1956 to 1970. He appeared in 300 first-class matches as a right-handed batsman who occasionally bowled off breaks. He scored 12,796 runs with a highest score of 191 not out among seven centuries and took six wickets with a best performance of two for 24.

== Sources ==
- John Wallace, 100 Greats – Sussex County Cricket Club, Tempus, 2002
