= Luke Doneathy =

English cricketer (born 2002)

Personal information
- Born: 26 July 2002 (age 24); Newcastle upon Tyne, Tyne and Wear, England
- Batting: Right-handed
- Bowling: Right-arm fast-medium
- Role: Bowler

Domestic team information
- Years: Team
- 2021–2023: Durham (squad no. 24)
- LA debut: 22 July 2021 Durham v Kent
- T20 debut: 9 July 2021 Durham v Derbyshire

Career statistics
Competition	List A	T20
Matches	11	7
Runs scored	188	24
Batting average	31.33	8.00
100s/50s	0/2	0/0
Top score	69*	12
Balls bowled	284	12
Wickets	8	1
Bowling average	39.00	19.00
5 wickets in innings	0	0
10 wickets in match	0	0
Best bowling	4/36	1/19
Catches/stumpings	5/–	0/–
- Source: Cricinfo, 13 August 2023

Luke Doneathy (born 26 July 2002) is an English cricketer. In 2019, aged just 16, Doneathy was given the opportunity to captain the first eleven of Benwell Hill Cricket Club by director of cricket Kyle Coetzer. He made his Twenty20 debut on 9 July 2021, for Durham in the 2021 T20 Blast. Prior to his Twenty20 debut, Doneathy played for the England under-19 cricket team. He made his List A debut on 22 July 2021, for Durham in the 2021 Royal London One-Day Cup.
