= Daniel Mitwali =

Australian soccer player (born 1992)

Personal information
- Date of birth: 20 January 1992 (age 34)
- Place of birth: Sydney, Australia
- Height: 1.81 m (5 ft 11 1/2 in)
- Positions: Central defender; defensive midfielder

Team information
- Current team: Altona Magic SC

Senior career*
Years	Team	Apps	(Gls)
2010–2011	Persiwa Wamena	4	(0)
2011	Kfarsoum	14	(3)
2012	Rockdale City Suns	12	(0)
2013	SV Rot-Weiß Hadamar	13	(1)
2013	SV Wehen Wiesbaden	0	(0)
2014	St George	5	(0)
2014–2016	Sutherland Sharks	38	(1)
2017	St George	24	(3)
2018	Altona Magic SC	28	(1)
2019–	Whittlesea Ranges FC	24	(1)
- * Club domestic league appearances and goals as of 2 October 2019

Daniel Mitwali (born 20 January 1992) is an Australian soccer player who plays for Altona Magic SC in the National Premier Leagues.

== Reality television ==
In 2009, Daniel was chosen from a large pool of young footballers throughout Australia to take part in a reality television program Football Superstar to be aired on Foxtel. After proceeding through to the final 15 contestants, he was unable to win the professional contract with A-League club Melbourne Victory.
