= Colin Banton =

English cricketer

Personal information
- Born: 15 September 1969 (age 57); Fish Hoek, Cape Province, South Africa
- Batting: Right-handed
- Relatives: Tom Banton (son); Jacques Banton (son)

Domestic team information
- Years: Team
- 1996: Buckinghamshire
- 1995: Nottinghamshire

Career statistics
Competition	First-class	List A
Matches	7	2
Runs scored	292	41
Batting average	29.20	20.50
100s/50s	0/2	0/0
Top score	80*	40
Balls bowled	48	–
Wickets	0	–
Bowling average	–	–
5 wickets in innings	–	–
10 wickets in match	–	–
Best bowling	–	–
Catches/stumpings	4/–	0/–
- Source: Cricinfo, 8 May 2011

Colin Banton (born 15 September 1969) is a South African born former English cricketer. Banton was a right-handed batsman. He was born in Fish Hoek, Cape Province.

Banton made his first-class debut for Nottinghamshire in 1995. He made 6 further first-class appearances for the county that season, the last coming against Warwickshire in the County Championship. In his 7 first-class appearances for Nottinghamshire, he scored 292 runs at a batting average of 29.20, with 2 half centuries and a high score of 80*. His highest score came on debut against Cambridge University. In that same season he made his List A debut for the county against Lancashire in the 1995 Benson & Hedges Cup. His second and final List A appearance came in the same season against Essex. In his 2 matches, he scored 41 runs at an average of 20.50, with a high score of 40.

After leaving Nottinghamshire, he made a single MCCA Knockout Trophy appearance for Buckinghamshire in 1996 against Devon. He also previously had played Second XI cricket for the Middlesex Second XI in 1993.
