= Connor Marshall =

Welsh cricketer (born 1998)

Personal information
- Full name: Connor Robert Marshall
- Born: 28 January 1998 (age 28); Cardiff, Wales
- Batting: Left-handed
- Bowling: Right-arm leg break
- Role: All-rounder

Domestic team information
- Years: Team
- 2021: Derbyshire (squad no. 5)
- List A debut: 22 July 2021; Derbyshire v Leicestershire

Career statistics
Competition	List A
Matches	5
Runs scored	55
Batting average	13.75
100s/50s	0/0
Top score	19
Balls bowled	114
Wickets	0
Bowling average	–
5 wickets in innings	–
10 wickets in match	–
Best bowling	–
Catches/stumpings	0/–
- Source: Cricinfo, 15 August 2021

Connor Robert Marshall (born 28 January 1998) is a Welsh cricketer. He made his List A debut on 22 July 2021, for Derbyshire in the 2021 Royal London One-Day Cup, after signing for Derbyshire earlier in the month.
