= Neil Lenham =

English cricketer (born 1965)

Personal information
- Full name: Neil John Lenham
- Born: 17 December 1965 (age 60); Worthing, Sussex, England
- Batting: Right-handed
- Bowling: Right-arm medium-fast
- Relatives: Les Lenham (father); Archie Lenham (son)

Domestic team information
- Years: Team
- 1984–1997: Sussex
- FC debut: 18 August 1984; Sussex v Sri Lankans
- Last FC: 16 July 1997 Sussex v Lancashire
- LA debut: 13 July 1985 Sussex v Zimbabweans
- Last LA: 13 July 1997 Sussex v Gloucestershire

Career statistics
Competition	First-class	List A
Matches	192	147
Runs scored	10,135	3,207
Batting average	33.44	31.13
100s/50s	20/49	1/20
Top score	222*	129*
Balls bowled	3,637	1,653
Wickets	42	44
Bowling average	43.97	31.59
5 wickets in innings	0	1
10 wickets in match	0	0
Best bowling	4/13	5/28
Catches/stumpings	73/–	24/–
- Source: Cricinfo, 14 June 2021

Neil John Lenham (born 17 December 1965) is a former English cricketer who played for Sussex and captained the England Under-19 cricket team in 3 Tests and 3 ODIs earlier in his career. He was born in Worthing.

Lenham played 192 first-class matches during his career, scoring 10,135 runs at an average of 33.44 in the process. He made 20 centuries with the highest being an unbeaten 222. With the ball, Lenham took 42 first-class wickets at a bowling average of 43.97 with best figures of 4 for 13.

In List A cricket he made 3,207 runs at an average of 31.13 with one century, an innings of 129 not out. He took 44 wickets at average of 31.59 with a best of 5 for 28.

After retiring from playing, Lenham took up coaching. He coached the Namibian national team at the 1997 ICC Trophy in Malaysia.
