= Nils Priestley =

English cricketer (born 2000)

Personal information
- Full name: Nils Oscar Priestley
- Born: 18 September 2000 (age 26); Sutton Coldfield, Warwickshire, England
- Batting: Left-handed
- Bowling: Left-arm Orthodox
- Role: All-rounder

Domestic team information
- Years: Team
- 2021: Derbyshire (squad no. 53)
- List A debut: 22 July 2021; Derbyshire v Leicestershire

Career statistics
Competition	List A
Matches	4
Runs scored	50
Batting average	50.00
100s/50s	0/0
Top score	25*
Balls bowled	36
Wickets	0
Bowling average	–
5 wickets in innings	–
10 wickets in match	–
Best bowling	–
Catches/stumpings	0/–
- Source: Cricinfo, 25 September 2021

Nils Oscar Priestley (born 18 September 2000) is an English cricketer. He attended Abbotsholme School and is a graduate of the Cricket Derbyshire Academy in partnership with the University of Derby. In 2023, he completed a degree at Loughborough University, having enrolled on the Loughborough MCCU programme.

He made his List A debut on 22 July 2021, for Derbyshire in the 2021 Royal London One-Day Cup.
