= Matt Revis =

English cricketer (born 2001)

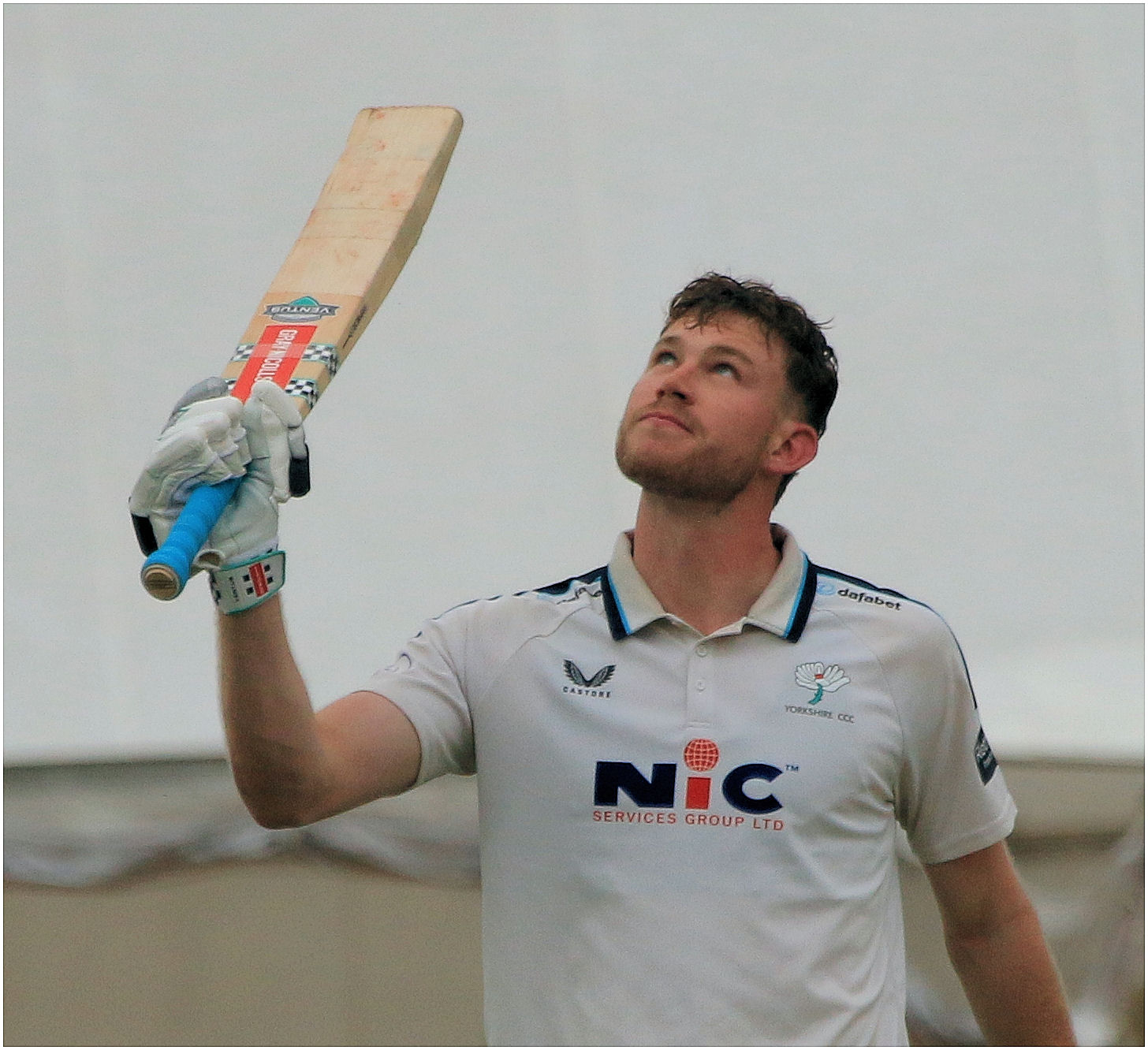
- Revis in 2025

Personal information
- Full name: Matthew Liam Revis
- Born: 15 November 2001 (age 24); Steeton, West Yorkshire, England
- Batting: Right-handed
- Bowling: Right-arm medium-fast
- Role: Batsman

Domestic team information
- Years: Team
- 2019–present: Yorkshire
- 2026–present: Sunrisers Leeds
- FC debut: 16 September 2019 Yorkshire v Kent
- List A debut: 22 July 2021 Yorkshire v Surrey

Career statistics
Competition	FC	LA	T20
Matches	52	37	70
Runs scored	2,178	859	695
Batting average	34.03	34.36	19.30
100s/50s	5/6	0/6	0/3
Top score	152*	85	69*
Balls bowled	4,304	1,374	753
Wickets	63	40	36
Bowling average	43.88	33.42	35.61
5 wickets in innings	1	0	0
10 wickets in match	0	0	0
Best bowling	5/50	4/54	2/10
Catches/stumpings	29/–	16/–	32/–
- Source: Cricinfo, 26 September 2026

Matthew Liam Revis (born 15 November 2001) is an English cricketer. He made his first-class debut on 16 September 2019, for Yorkshire in the 2019 County Championship. He made his Twenty20 debut 17 September 2020, for Yorkshire in the 2020 T20 Blast. He made his List A debut on 22 July 2021, for Yorkshire in the 2021 Royal London One-Day Cup.
