= Jacques Banton =

English cricketer (born 2001)

Personal information
- Born: 6 July 2001 (age 25); Perpignan, France
- Batting: Right-handed
- Bowling: Slow left-arm orthodox
- Role: All-rounder
- Relatives: Colin Banton (father); Tom Banton (brother)

Domestic team information
- Years: Team
- 2021–2022: Worcestershire (squad no. 77)
- List A debut: 25 July 2021 Worcestershire v Kent
- Only Twenty20: 9 June 2022 Worcestershire v Northamptonshire

Career statistics
| Competition | List A | Twenty20 |
|---|---|---|
| Matches | 3 | 1 |
| Runs scored | 56 | 0 |
| Batting average | 18.66 | 0.00 |
| 100s/50s | 0/0 | 0/0 |
| Top score | 33 | 0 |
| Balls bowled | 72 | 6 |
| Wickets | 4 | 1 |
| Bowling average | 13.75 | 6.00 |
| 5 wickets in innings | 0 | 0 |
| 10 wickets in match | 0 | 0 |
| Best bowling | 3/15 | 1/6 |
| Catches/stumpings | 2/– | 0/– |
- Source: Cricinfo, 21 June 2022

Jacques Banton (born 6 July 2001) is an English cricketer. He is the brother of Somerset and England wicket-keeper batsman Tom Banton. His father Colin Banton played seven first-class and two List A games for Nottinghamshire in 1995. A former pupil at Bromsgrove School and King's College, Taunton, Jacques was part of the Worcestershire Academy intake for 2018–2019 after switching from Warwickshire, and signed a rookie contract with Worcestershire on 16 June 2021. He made his List A debut on 25 July 2021, for Worcestershire in the 2021 Royal London One-Day Cup. He made his Twenty20 debut on 9 June 2022, for Worcestershire in the 2022 T20 Blast.
