= Josh Rymell =

English cricketer (born 2001)

Personal information
- Full name: Joshua Sean Rymell
- Born: 4 April 2001 (age 25); Ipswich, Suffolk, England
- Batting: Right-handed
- Role: Batsman

Domestic team information
- Years: Team
- 2021–2023: Essex (squad no. 49)
- First-class debut: 30 August 2021 Essex v Glamorgan
- List A debut: 1 August 2021 Essex v Kent

Career statistics
Competition	FC	LA	T20
Matches	4	16	3
Runs scored	49	428	28
Batting average	9.80	28.53	9.33
100s/50s	0/0	1/1	0/0
Top score	21	121	21
Catches/stumpings	4/–	13/–	2/–
- Source: Cricinfo, 29 September 2023

Joshua Sean Rymell (born 4 April 2001) is an English cricketer. Rymell joined Essex age group teams in 2015, but had to overcome the setback of an anterior cruciate ligament injury in August 2019, prior to signing his first rookie contract with Essex in 2020. He made his Twenty20 debut on 18 July 2021, for Essex in the 2021 T20 Blast.

== Cricket career ==
Rymell made his List A debut on 1 August 2021, for Essex in the 2021 Royal London One-Day Cup. During the tournament, Rymell scored his first century in a List A match, with 121 runs against Yorkshire in the quarter-finals. Rymell made his first-class debut on 30 August 2021, for Essex in the 2021 County Championship. He was released by Essex at the end of the 2023 season.
