= Matt Lamb (cricketer) =

English cricketer (born 1996)

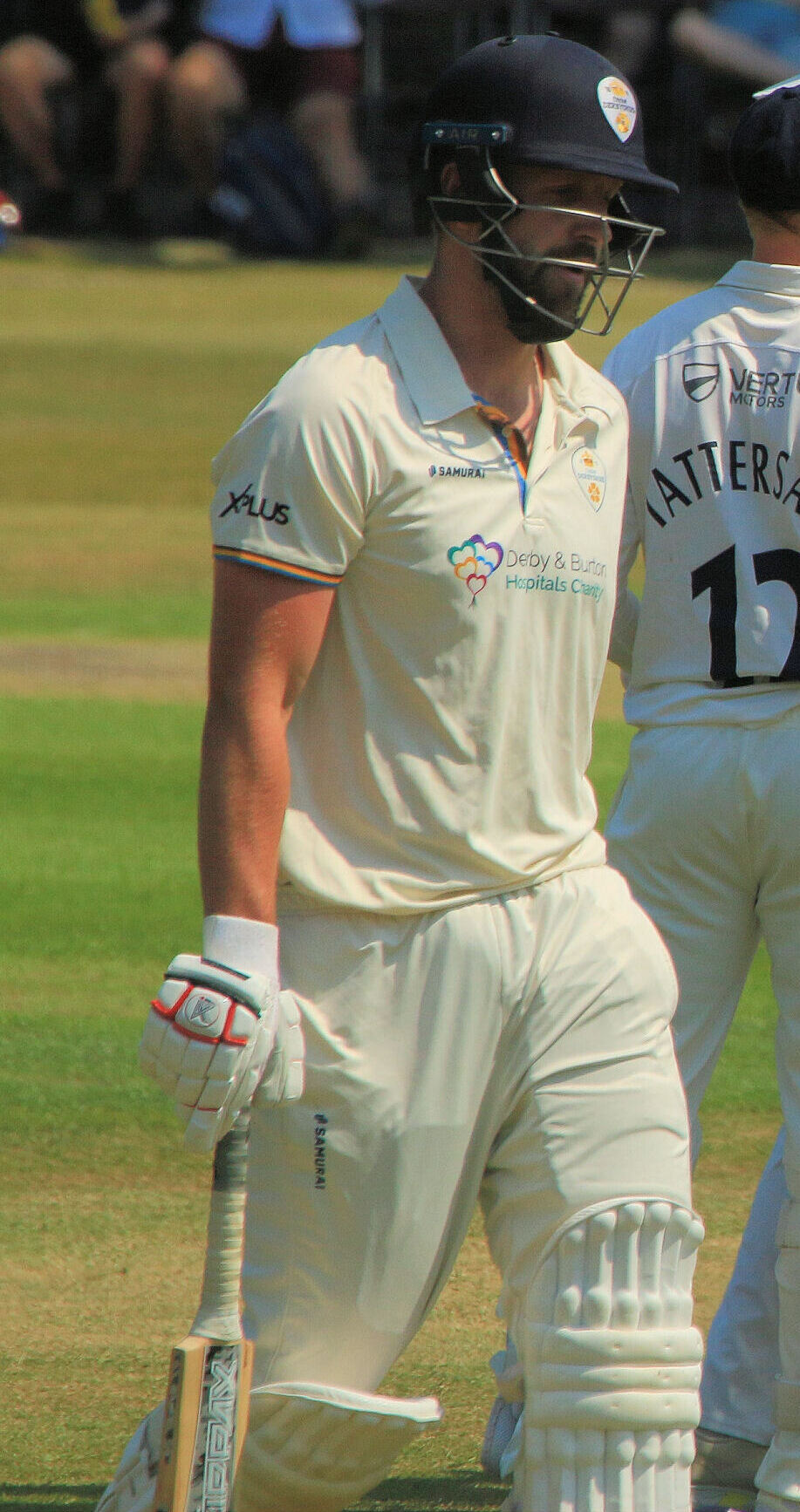
- Lamb in 2023

Personal information
- Full name: Matthew James Lamb
- Born: 19 July 1996 (age 30); Wolverhampton, West Midlands, England
- Height: 6 ft 3 in (1.91 m)
- Batting: Right-handed
- Bowling: Right-arm spin
- Role: Batsman

Domestic team information
- Years: Team
- 2016–2022: Warwickshire (squad no. 7)
- 2023–2024: Derbyshire (squad no. 7)
- First-class debut: 6 September 2016 Warwickshire v Somerset
- List A debut: 5 May 2017 Warwickshire v Nottinghamshire

Career statistics
Competition	FC	LA	T20
Matches	54	28	10
Runs scored	2,468	647	168
Batting average	31.24	34.05	24.00
100s/50s	4/10	1/3	0/0
Top score	207	119*	39
Balls bowled	710	234	6
Wickets	9	4	0
Bowling average	49.66	57.00	–
5 wickets in innings	0	0	–
10 wickets in match	0	0	–
Best bowling	2/38	4/35	–
Catches/stumpings	19/–	14/–	4/–
- Source: Cricinfo, 19 August 2024

Matthew James Lamb (born 19 July 1996) is a former English cricketer. He made his first-class debut for Warwickshire on 6 September 2016 in the 2016 County Championship. He made his List A debut for Warwickshire in the 2017 Royal London One-Day Cup on 5 May 2017. He made his Twenty20 debut on 11 August 2019, for Warwickshire in the 2019 t20 Blast.

At the end of the 2022 season, Lamb signed a two-year contract with Derbyshire. In September 2024 Lamb announced his retirement from professional cricket.
