= Roman Walker =

Welsh cricketer (born 2000)

Personal information
- Full name: Roman Isaac Walker
- Born: 6 August 2000 (age 26); Wrexham, Clwyd, Wales
- Batting: Right-handed
- Bowling: Right-arm medium-fast
- Role: All-rounder

Domestic team information
- Years: Team
- 2019–2021: Glamorgan (squad no. 37)
- 2021: → Leicestershire (squad no. 49)
- 2022–2025: Leicestershire (squad no. 49)
- FC debut: 20 July 2022 Leicestershire v Glamorgan
- LA debut: 7 May 2019 Glamorgan v Sussex

Career statistics
Competition	FC	LA	T20
Matches	5	18	20
Runs scored	152	174	54
Batting average	21.71	19.33	7.71
100s/50s	0/1	0/0	0/0
Top score	64	44	19*
Balls bowled	654	759	373
Wickets	10	19	24
Bowling average	39.80	42.26	24.16
5 wickets in innings	0	1	0
10 wickets in match	0	0	0
Best bowling	3/78	6/43	3/15
Catches/stumpings	2/–	6/–	6/–
- Source: Cricinfo, 26 August 2025

Roman Isaac Walker (born 6 August 2000) is a Welsh cricketer, who played internationally for England at age-group level. He made his List A debut on 7 May 2019, for Glamorgan in the 2019 Royal London One-Day Cup. Prior to his List A debut, he was named in England's squad for the 2018 Under-19 Cricket World Cup. He made his Twenty20 debut on 24 August 2019, for Glamorgan in the 2019 t20 Blast. He made his first-class debut on 20 July 2022, for Leicestershire in the 2022 County Championship. Walker signed a new one-year contract with Leicestershire in October 2024. He was released by Leicestershire in September 2026 and signed for National Counties club.Shropshire.
