= Steven Reingold =

English cricketer

Personal information
- Full name: Steven Jack Reingold
- Born: 7 August 1998 (age 28); Cape Town, Western Cape, South Africa
- Batting: Right-handed
- Bowling: Right-arm off break

Domestic team information
- Years: Team
- 2019: Cardiff MCCU
- 2021: Glamorgan
- First-class debut: 26 March 2019 Cardiff MCCU v Somerset
- List A debut: 22 July 2021 Glamorgan v Warwickshire

Career statistics
Competition	FC	LA
Matches	3	10
Runs scored	42	187
Batting average	8.40	20.77
100s/50s	0/0	0/0
Top score	22	40
Balls bowled	366	162
Wickets	6	5
Bowling average	45.16	32.60
5 wickets in innings	0	0
10 wickets in match	0	0
Best bowling	3/15	1/16
Catches/stumpings	1/–	8/–
- Source: Cricinfo, 25 September 2021

Steven Jack Reingold (born 7 August 1998) is a South African-born English first-class cricketer.

Reingold was born at Cape Town in August 1998. He moved to England at a young age and was educated in London at the Jewish Free School, before going up to Cardiff University. While studying at Cardiff, he made his First-class debut for Cardiff MCCU against Somerset on 26 March 2019 and played against Sussex in the same year. He scored 29 runs in his two matches, while with his off break bowling he took 3 wickets at an expensive average of 85.33. He made his List A debut on 22 July 2021, for Glamorgan in the 2021 Royal London One-Day Cup.
