= Tom Cullen (cricketer) =

Australian-English cricketer (born 1992)

Personal information
- Full name: Thomas Nicholas Cullen
- Born: 4 January 1992 (age 34); Perth, Western Australia
- Batting: Right-handed
- Role: Wicket-keeper

Domestic team information
- Years: Team
- 2015–2017: Cardiff MCCU
- 2017–2022: Glamorgan
- FC debut: 7 April 2015 Cardiff MCCU v Gloucestershire
- LA debut: 22 July 2021 Glamorgan v Warwickshire

Career statistics
Competition	FC	LA	T20
Matches	22	17	1
Runs scored	629	321	5
Batting average	19.65	35.66	5.00
100s/50s	0/4	0/2	0/0
Top score	63	80*	5
Catches/stumpings	58/1	21/3	1/0
- Source: ESPNcricinfo, 13 August 2021

Thomas Nicholas Cullen (born 4 January 1992) is an Australian professional cricketer. He attended Aquinas College in Perth. He played as a right-handed batsman and wicketkeeper for Glamorgan County Cricket Club. He made his first-class debut for Cardiff MCC University against Gloucestershire in April 2015. He made his Twenty20 debut on 18 June 2021, for Glamorgan in the 2021 T20 Blast. He made his List A debut on 22 July 2021, for Glamorgan in the 2021 Royal London One-Day Cup. Glamorgan would later go on to win the 2021 tournament with Cullen taking the winning catch in the final against Durham. When Tom was younger, he was selected as one of four Western Australian contestants for FOX 8's reality TV show Football Superstar. He would compete on the Australia wide show for season one and two as West Australia's captain and have a best place finish getting to the last 8 to be awarded a contract for an A-League club.
