= Sam King (cricketer) =

English cricketer (born 2003)

Personal information
- Full name: Samuel Isaac Michael King
- Born: 12 January 2003 (age 23); Nottingham, Nottinghamshire, England
- Batting: Right-handed
- Bowling: Right-arm fast-medium

Domestic team information
- Years: Team
- 2021–2025: Nottinghamshire (squad no. 1)
- 2026: Northamptonshire
- LA debut: 8 August 2021 Nottinghamshire v Glamorgan
- T20 debut: 19 July 2024 Nottinghamshire v Yorkshire

Career statistics
Competition	List A	T20
Matches	9	1
Runs scored	160	44
Batting average	20.00	44.00
100s/50s	0/1	0/0
Top score	67	44
Catches/stumpings	5/–	1/–
- Source: Cricinfo, 11 August 2026

Samuel Isaac Michael King (born 12 January 2003) is an English cricketer He made his List A debut on 8 August 2021, for Nottinghamshire in the 2021 Royal London One-Day Cup, as a concussion replacement for Lyndon James. King made his first T20 appearance for Nottinghamshire in a T20 Blast match against Yorkshire at Headingley on 19 July 2024, scoring 44. He left Nottinghamshire in October 2025 after his contract expired.
