= Josh Sullivan (cricketer) =

English cricketer (born 2000)

Personal information
- Full name: Joshua Richard Sullivan
- Born: 4 August 2000 (age 26); Leeds, West Yorkshire, England
- Batting: Right-handed
- Bowling: Right-arm leg break

Domestic team information
- Years: Team
- 2021: Yorkshire (squad no. 4)
- List A debut: 6 August 2021 Yorkshire v Nottinghamshire

Career statistics
Competition	List A
Matches	3
Runs scored	6
Batting average	6.00
100s/50s	0/0
Top score	6
Balls bowled	84
Wickets	5
Bowling average	15.80
5 wickets in innings	0
10 wickets in match	0
Best bowling	4/11
Catches/stumpings	0/–
- Source: Cricinfo, 15 August 2021

Joshua Richard Sullivan (born 4 August 2000) is an English cricketer. He made his List A debut on 6 August 2021, for Yorkshire in the 2021 Royal London One-Day Cup.
