= Ashish Chakrapani =

English cricketer

Personal information
- Full name: Ashish M Chakrapani
- Batting: Left-handed

Domestic team information
- Years: Team
- 2021: Warwickshire
- List A debut: 22 July 2021 Warwickshire v Glamorgan

Career statistics
Competition	List A
Matches	2
Runs scored	22
Batting average	11.00
100s/50s	0/0
Top score	18
Balls bowled	–
Wickets	0
Bowling average	–
5 wickets in innings	–
10 wickets in match	–
Best bowling	–
Catches/stumpings	0/–
- Source: Cricinfo, 25 August 2021

Ashish Chakrapani is an English cricketer. He made his List A debut on 22 July 2021, for Warwickshire in the 2021 Royal London One-Day Cup. He also played at the Birmingham League Premier.
