= Josh Sullivan (baseball) =

American baseball and football player (born 1984)

- Pitcher
- Born: July 5, 1984 (age 41); Little Rock, Arkansas, U.S.
- Bats: Right Throws: Right
- Stats at Baseball Reference

Joshua David Sullivan (born July 5, 1984) is an American former professional baseball pitcher. Prior to becoming a professional, Sullivan attended Auburn University, where he played college baseball and college football for the Auburn Tigers.

== Career ==
Sullivan attended Little Rock Central High School in Little Rock, Arkansas, graduating in 2002. He played for the baseball and American football teams at Little Rock Central. Recruited as a pitcher and infielder by many baseball programs, Sullivan chose to enroll at Auburn University, which offered him the opportunity to play football as well as baseball.

Sullivan played college baseball for the Auburn Tigers baseball team. He was also a walk-on for the Auburn Tigers football team as a quarterback, backing up Jason Campbell as a redshirt freshman, surpassing Brandon Cox on the Tigers' depth chart. As a sophomore, Sullivan chose to pursue baseball full-time, giving up football.

The Rockies drafted Sullivan in the fifth round of the 2005 Major League Baseball draft. He endured arm surgeries that limited his appearances in minor league baseball. These surgeries included shoulder surgery in 2007, elbow surgery in 2008, and elbow ligament replacement surgery in March 2009. Sullivan opened the 2011 and 2012 seasons with the Tulsa Drillers of the Class AA Texas League.

The Rockies added Sullivan to their forty-man roster after the 2012 season. Sullivan was designated for assignment on August 1, 2013, to make room on the forty-man roster for Chad Bettis.

== Personal ==
Sullivan is the third of ten children. His father played college football for the Arkansas Razorbacks football team. He is married; his wife's name is Lyndsey.
