= Tom Wood (Derbyshire cricketer) =

English cricketer

Personal information
- Full name: Thomas Anthony Wood
- Born: 11 May 1994 (age 32); Derbyshire, England
- Batting: Right-handed
- Bowling: Right-arm medium

Domestic team information
- Years: Team
- 2016–2017: Derbyshire (squad no. 23)
- 2020–present: Derbyshire (squad no. 24)
- First-class debut: 12 September 2016 Derbyshire v Leicestershire
- List A debut: 15 July 2016 Derbyshire v Sri Lanka A

Career statistics
Competition	FC	LA	T20
Matches	12	17	15
Runs scored	217	299	460
Batting average	10.85	19.93	38.33
100s/50s	0/0	1/0	1/2
Top score	31	109	110*
Balls bowled	–	132	36
Wickets	–	3	1
Bowling average	–	41.66	56.00
5 wickets in innings	–	0	0
10 wickets in match	–	0	0
Best bowling	–	1/13	1/17
Catches/stumpings	9/–	2/–	7/–
- Source: Cricinfo, 23 August 2023

Thomas Anthony Wood (born 11 May 1994) is an English cricketer who plays for Derbyshire County Cricket Club. His career started with a cover drive for four runs off his very first ball against a Sri Lanka A touring team in a List A game, where he went onto score 44 off 41 balls. After scoring heavily in Derbyshire's second XI, Wood went onto make his first-class debut for Derbyshire at the end of 2016 where he played the last two games of the season against Leicestershire and Worcestershire. Primarily an aggressive right-handed batsman, he also bowls right-arm off spin. He made his Twenty20 debut for Derbyshire in the 2017 NatWest t20 Blast on 3 August 2017.

Wood was released by Derbyshire after the 2017 season but continued to make appearances for the second XI and in local cricket. After a number of impressive appearances in 2019 he rejoined the county on a short-term contract intended to cover the 2020 Royal London One-Day Cup, which was ultimately cancelled due to the COVID-19 pandemic. Wood's contract would instead cover all formats for the truncated 2020 season.
