= Joe Cooke (cricketer) =

English cricketer (born 1997)

Personal information
- Full name: Joseph Michael Cooke
- Born: 30 May 1997 (age 29); Hemel Hempstead, Hertfordshire, England
- Batting: Left-handed
- Bowling: Right-arm medium-fast

Domestic team information
- Years: Team
- 2017–2018: Durham MCCU
- 2020–2022: Glamorgan (squad no. 57)
- First-class debut: 28 March 2017 Durham MCCU v Gloucestershire
- List A debut: 22 July 2021 Glamorgan v Warwickshire

Career statistics
| Competition | FC | LA | T20 |
|---|---|---|---|
| Matches | 14 | 17 | 2 |
| Runs scored | 279 | 266 | 10 |
| Batting average | 16.41 | 29.55 | – |
| 100s/50s | 0/1 | 0/1 | 0/0 |
| Top score | 68 | 66* | 10* |
| Balls bowled | 534 | 623 | – |
| Wickets | 3 | 22 | – |
| Bowling average | 119.66 | 22.04 | – |
| 5 wickets in innings | 0 | 1 | – |
| 10 wickets in match | 0 | 0 | – |
| Best bowling | 1/26 | 5/61 | – |
| Catches/stumpings | 14/– | 9/– | 0/– |
- Source: Cricinfo, 30 September 2022

Joseph Michael Cooke (born 30 May 1997) is an English cricketer. He made his first-class debut on 28 March 2017 for Durham MCCU against Gloucestershire as part of the Marylebone Cricket Club University fixtures. He made his List A debut on 22 July 2021, for Glamorgan in the 2021 Royal London One-Day Cup. On 16 August 2021, in the semi-final of the tournament, Cooke took his first five-wicket haul in List A cricket. He made his Twenty20 debut on 26 May 2022, for Glamorgan in the 2022 T20 Blast.

Cooke studied at Durham University.
