= Archie Lenham =

English cricketer (born 2004)

Personal information
- Full name: Archie David Lenham
- Born: 23 July 2004 (age 22); Eastbourne, East Sussex, England
- Batting: Right-handed
- Bowling: Right-arm leg break
- Relatives: Neil Lenham (father); Les Lenham (grandfather)

Domestic team information
- Years: Team
- 2021–2025: Sussex (squad no. 41)
- 2021: Southern Brave
- FC debut: 30 August 2021 Sussex v Worcestershire
- LA debut: 23 July 2021 Sussex v Lancashire

Career statistics
Competition	FC	LA	T20
Matches	7	28	24
Runs scored	206	228	15
Batting average	20.60	16.28	15.00
100s/50s	0/0	0/0	0/0
Top score	48	45*	7*
Balls bowled	835	1,222	366
Wickets	7	30	14
Bowling average	75.42	39.00	35.78
5 wickets in innings	0	1	0
10 wickets in match	0	0	0
Best bowling	4/84	5/48	4/26
Catches/stumpings	2/–	9/–	5/–
- Source: Cricinfo, 26 August 2025

Archie David Lenham (born 23 July 2004) is an English professional cricketer who plays for Sussex County Cricket Club. Lenham is a right-handed batsman and a right-arm leg break bowler.

== Early and personal life ==
The son of Neil Lenham and grandson of Les Lenham, Archie is believed to be the youngest ever player to play for Eastbourne Cricket Club's First XI when playing against Horsham in the Sussex Premier League in July 2019 at the age of 14. His older brother Scott played in the same match.

He featured as a youngster at the Bunbury Cricket Festival in 2021.

== Career ==
Lenham made his T20 debut for Sussex, aged 16, against Gloucestershire in the 2021 t20 Blast on 11 June 2021 and became the second youngest player ever to play in t20 Blast history after Derbyshire's Hamidullah Qadri. He also became the first player ever to make his T20 Blast debut who was born after the inception of the tournament. He made his List A debut on 23 July 2021, for Sussex in the 2021 Royal London One-Day Cup. In August 2021, Lenham was signed for Southern Brave as a replacement for Liam Dawson in the 2021 season of The Hundred. Lenham made his first-class debut on 30 August 2021, for Sussex in the 2021 County Championship.

In January 2023 Lenhman signed a new contract with Sussex.

== International career ==
In December 2022 he was selected for the England national under-19 cricket team to play Australia in January 2023 under head coach Michael Yardy.
