= Mitch Wagstaff =

English cricketer (born 2003)

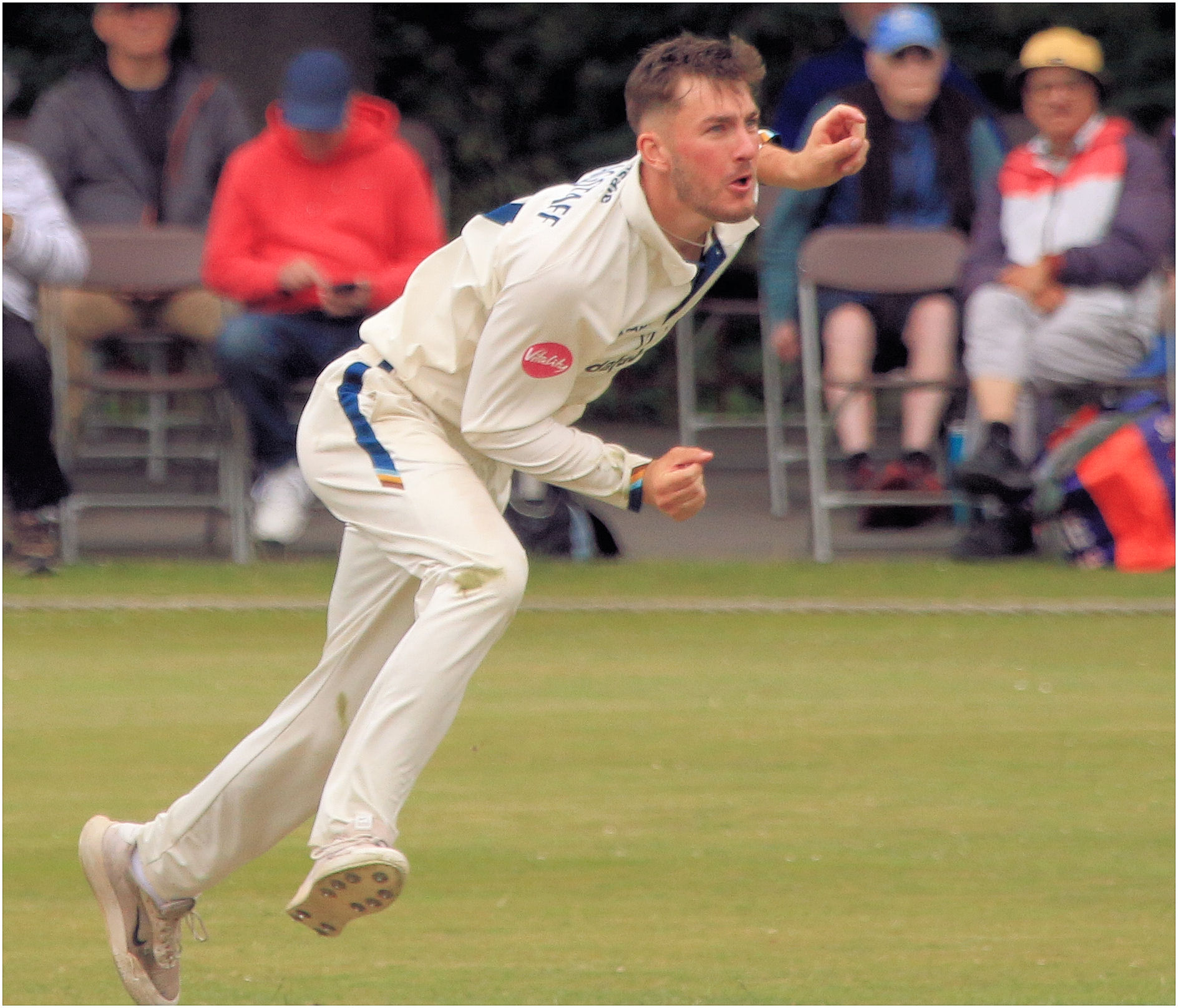
- Wagstaff in 2024

Personal information
- Full name: Mitchell David Wagstaff
- Born: 2 September 2003 (age 23); Derby, Derbyshire, England
- Batting: Left-handed
- Bowling: Right-arm leg break

Domestic team information
- Years: Team
- 2021–present: Derbyshire (squad no. 22)
- First-class debut: 11 May 2023 Derbyshire v Gloucestershire
- List A debut: 30 July 2021 Derbyshire v Glamorgan

Career statistics
Competition	FC	LA	T20
Matches	7	9	6
Runs scored	240	81	1
Batting average	21.81	11.57	–
100s/50s	0/2	0/0	0/0
Top score	78	36	1*
Balls bowled	420	108	102
Wickets	5	2	1
Bowling average	51.60	46.00	142.00
5 wickets in innings	0	0	0
10 wickets in match	0	0	0
Best bowling	2/24	1/37	1/31
Catches/stumpings	2/–	3/–	4/–
- Source: Cricinfo, 12 August 2026

Mitchell David Wagstaff (born 2 September 2003) is an English cricketer. He made his List A debut on 30 July 2021, for Derbyshire in the 2021 Royal London One-Day Cup.

Wagstaff attended Trent College.
