= Callum Taylor (Welsh cricketer) =

Welsh cricketer (born 1998)

Personal information
- Full name: Callum Zinzan Taylor
- Born: 19 June 1998 (age 28); Newport, Wales
- Batting: Right-handed
- Bowling: Right-arm off break
- Role: All-rounder

Domestic team information
- Years: Team
- 2019–2023: Glamorgan (squad no. 4)
- First-class debut: 22 August 2020 Glamorgan v Northamptonshire
- List A debut: 22 July 2021 Glamorgan v Warwickshire

Career statistics
Competition	FC	LA	T20
Matches	11	3	20
Runs scored	425	53	169
Batting average	30.35	17.66	13.00
100s/50s	1/2	0/0	0/0
Top score	106	36	23
Balls bowled	1,154	108	78
Wickets	7	3	5
Bowling average	90.85	30.33	23.60
5 wickets in innings	0	0	0
10 wickets in match	0	0	0
Best bowling	2/16	1/6	2/9
Catches/stumpings	2/–	0/–	7/–
- Source: Cricinfo, 29 September 2023

Callum Zinzan Taylor (born 19 June 1998) is a Welsh cricketer. He made his Twenty20 debut on 9 August 2019, for Glamorgan in the 2019 t20 Blast. He made his first-class debut on 22 August 2020, for Glamorgan in the 2020 Bob Willis Trophy, scoring a century in the first innings. Taylor became the fourth batsman for Glamorgan to score a century on debut in a first-class match. He made his List A debut on 22 July 2021, for Glamorgan in the 2021 Royal London One-Day Cup.
