= Kent County Cricket Club in 2024 =

2024 season of an English cricket team

Kent County Cricket Club
2024 season
- Coach: (England) Matthew Walker
- Captain: (England) Daniel Bell-Drummond
- Overseas players: (Australia) Wes Agar; (South Africa) Beyers Swanepoel; (Australia) Charlie Stobo; (Australia) Xavier Bartlett (T20 only); (Australia) Tom Rogers (T20 only); (Barbados) Akeem Jordan
- Ground(s): St Lawrence Ground, Canterbury; County Ground, Beckenham
- County Championship: 9th
- One-Day Cup: 10th, Division one
- T20 Blast: 9th, South group

In 2024, Kent County Cricket Club will compete in the 2024 County Championship, the 2024 One-Day Cup and the 2024 T20 Blast. The season was the eighth in charge for head coach, and former player, Matthew Walker. Sam Billings stepped down as club captain, signed a white-ball only contract and retained captaincy of the Twenty20 side. Daniel Bell-Drummond was named as the 36th men's Captain of Kent Cricket. Paul Downton retired as Director of Cricket at the end of the 2023 season, and was replaced by bowling coach Simon Cook. Former Kent bowler Robbie Joseph replaced Cook as bowling coach. Batting coach Alex Gidman left his role to become assistant coach with the England women's team. Gidman was replaced by Toby Radford.

== Squad ==
=== Departures ===
Michael Hogan retired from cricket at the end of the 2023 season. Wicket-keeper Jordan Cox signed for Essex. Alex Blake, who made his debut for Kent in 2008, and James Logan were both released by the county after the 2023 season.

=== Arrivals ===
In June 2023, Kent announced that England leg-spinner Matt Parkinson would join from Lancashire at the end of the season. In 2023, Parkinson played on loan for Kent in the One Day Cup. In October 2023, Kent announced the signing of bowler George Garrett. The following month, Kent signed bowler Michael Cohen, a South African who qualifies as a non-overseas player through residency.

Kent re-signed Australian fast bowler Wes Agar for the first four months of the season, having represented the county in 2023. Kent also signed a second Australian fast bowler for the first half of the season, Xavier Bartlett, who had played alongside Sam Billings for Brisbane Heat during Big Bash 13. However, Cricket Australia withdrew permission for Bartlett's Championship stint the day before the start of the season. Kent signed South African all-rounder Beyers Swanepoel from 1 May. It was later announced that Bartlett would join up with Kent for eight matches in the 2024 T20 Blast. On 1 May, Kent announced a fourth overseas player, with Australian pace bowler Charlie Stobo signing a contract until 16 September, making him available for all formats.

On 28 June, Kent signed Essex batsman Feroze Khushi on a short-term loan deal to play one match in the County Championship and three in the T20 Blast. On 4 July, Kent signed their fifth overseas player of the season, with Australian bowler Tom Rogers joining the club for the remainder of the T20 Blast. Rogers arrived after Bartlett's spell had ended and Wes Agar had been forced to leave due to injury.

Swanepoel left the club after the conclusion of the One Day Cup due to being selected for South Africa A. He was replaced by West Indian fast bowler Akeem Jordan for the remainder of the County Championship fixtures. Somerset bowler Alfie Ogborne joined Kent on loan for two Championship matches from 21 August.

=== Squad list ===
- Ages given as of the first day of the County Championship, 5 April 2024.

No.	Name	Nationality	Birth date	Batting style	Bowling style	Notes
Batsmen
2	Ben Compton	England	29 March 1994 (aged 30)	Left-handed	Right-arm off break	
5	Ekansh Singh	England	16 July 2006 (aged 17)	Right-handed	Right-arm medium	
6	Joe Denly	England	16 March 1986 (aged 38)	Right-handed	Right-arm leg break	
14	Tawanda Muyeye	Zimbabwe	5 March 2001 (aged 23)	Right-handed	Right-arm off break	Qualifies as a domestic player
16	Zak Crawley	England	3 February 1998 (aged 26)	Right-handed	Right-arm medium	
23	Daniel Bell-Drummond	England	3 August 1993 (aged 30)	Right-handed	Right-arm medium	Club captain
34	Jack Leaning	England	18 October 1993 (aged 30)	Right-handed	Right-arm medium/off break	Vice-captain
All-rounders
9	Grant Stewart	Italy	19 February 1994 (aged 30)	Right-handed	Right-arm medium	EU passport
13	Beyers Swanepoel	South Africa	6 May 1998 (aged 25)	Left-handed	Right-arm fast	Overseas player (May–August)
33	Joey Evison	England	14 November 2001 (aged 22)	Right-handed	Right arm medium	
42	Jaydn Denly	England	5 January 2006 (aged 18)	Left-handed	Slow left arm orthodox	
55	Marcus O'Riordan	England	25 January 1998 (aged 26)	Right-handed	Right-arm off break	
Wicket-keepers
7	Sam Billings	England	15 June 1991 (aged 32)	Right-handed	—	White-ball contract only
72	Harry Finch	England	10 February 1995 (aged 29)	Right-handed	Right-arm medium-fast	
Bowlers
8	Wes Agar	Australia	5 February 1997 (aged 27)	Right-handed	Right-arm fast-medium	Overseas player (April–July)
15	Xavier Bartlett	Australia	17 December 1998 (aged 25)	Right-handed	Right-arm fast-medium	Overseas player (T20 only)
17	Nathan Gilchrist	South Africa	11 June 2000 (aged 23)	Left-handed	Right-arm fast-medium	UK passport
18	Fred Klaassen	Netherlands	13 November 1992 (aged 31)	Right-handed	Left-arm medium-fast	
19	Jas Singh	England	19 September 2002 (aged 21)	Right-handed	Right-arm fast-medium	
26	Arafat Bhuiyan	England	11 October 1996 (aged 27)	Right-handed	Right-arm fast-medium	
28	Matt Parkinson	England	24 October 1996 (aged 27)	Right-handed	Right-arm leg break	
35	Charlie Stobo	Australia	8 March 1995 (aged 29)	Right-handed	Right-arm fast-medium	Overseas player (May–September)
44	George Garrett	England	4 March 2000 (aged 24)	Left-handed	Left-arm fast	
45	Michael Cohen	South Africa	4 August 1998 (aged 25)	Left-handed	Left-arm fast-medium	UK residency
64	Matt Quinn	New Zealand	28 February 1993 (aged 31)	Right-handed	Right-arm medium-fast	UK passport
75	Hamidullah Qadri	England	5 January 2000 (aged 24)	Right-handed	Right-arm off break	
81	Akeem Jordan	Barbados	18 October 1994 (aged 29)	Right-handed	Right-arm fast-medium	Overseas player (August–September)

== County Championship ==
=== Division One ===
Pos	Team	Pld	W	L	T	D	A	Bat	Bowl	Ded	Pts	
1	Surrey	14	8	2	0	4	0	34	37	0	231	
2	Hampshire	14	6	1	0	6	1	31	33	2	214	
3	Somerset	14	5	3	0	6	0	28	40	0	196	
4	Essex	14	6	3	0	5	0	34	36	12	194	
5	Durham	14	4	4	0	5	1	30	30	1	171	
6	Worcestershire	14	3	4	0	7	0	21	37	0	162	
7	Warwickshire	14	1	4	0	9	0	33	38	0	159	
8	Nottinghamshire	14	2	4	0	8	0	25	35	1	155	
9	Lancashire	14	3	6	0	5	0	15	34	3	134	Relegation to Division 2
10	Kent	14	1	8	0	5	0	12	32	1	99	Relegation to Division 2

Source: Cricinfo

5–8 April	Kent (H)	v	Somerset	Match drawn
Scorecard	284 (78.4 overs); Joey Evison 85 (116); Lewis Gregory 4/66 (14.4 overs)		403 (110.1 overs); Tom Lammonby 90 (185); Nathan Gilchrist 3/64 (19.1 overs)	St Lawrence Ground, Canterbury; Umpires: Rob Bailey and Russell Warren
Scorecard	290/4d (63 overs); Joe Denly 110 (142); Lewis Goldsworthy 2/73 (15 overs)			St Lawrence Ground, Canterbury; Umpires: Rob Bailey and Russell Warren
Somerset won the toss and elected to field.; No play was possible on day one due to rain.; Points: Kent 12, Somerset 15; George Garrett played his first game for Kent.

12–15 April	Essex (H)	v	Kent	Match drawn
Scorecard	530/7d (112 overs); Matt Critchley 151* (212); George Garrett 2/80 (23 overs)		413 (135.1 overs); Ben Compton 165 (363); Matt Critchley 5/105 (29 overs)	County Ground, Chelmsford; Umpires: Ian Blackwell and Graham Lloyd
Scorecard	257/4d (40 overs); Jordan Cox 116* (89); Wes Agar 2/47 (9 overs)		164/7 (67.4 overs); Jaydn Denly 41* (128); Jamie Porter 4/20 (11 overs)	County Ground, Chelmsford; Umpires: Ian Blackwell and Graham Lloyd
Essex won the toss and elected to bat.; No play was possible before lunch on day four due to rain.; Points: Essex 15, Kent 12; Jaydn Denly made his first-class debut.

19–22 April	Kent (H)	v	Surrey	Surrey won by an innings and 37 runs
Scorecard	244 (81.4 overs); Daniel Bell-Drummond 70 (109); Cameron Steel 3/34 (14 overs)		543/7d (114 overs); Dom Sibley 150 (253); Matt Parkinson 5/177 (36 overs)	St Lawrence Ground, Canterbury; Umpires: Mike Burns and Ben Debenham
Scorecard	262 (86.2 overs); Joey Evison 53 (119); Daniel Worrall 4/31 (19 overs)			St Lawrence Ground, Canterbury; Umpires: Mike Burns and Ben Debenham
Surrey won the toss and elected to field.; Only 11 balls were bowled before tea on day one.; Points: Kent 2, Surrey 24

3–6 May	Kent	v	Lancashire (H)	Kent won by 7 wickets
Scorecard	261 (85.1 overs); Joey Evison 71* (150); Will Williams 3/44 (19.1 overs)		92 (30 overs); Matthew Hurst 36 (46); Nathan Gilchrist 6/24 (8 overs)	Old Trafford, Manchester; Umpires: Graham Lloyd and Paul Pollard
Scorecard	166/3 (50.2 overs); Daniel Bell-Drummond 79* (156); Nathan Lyon 2/48 (22 overs)		332 (106.3 overs) (f/o); George Bell 65 (143); Wes Agar 3/65 (21 overs)	Old Trafford, Manchester; Umpires: Graham Lloyd and Paul Pollard
Lancashire won the toss and elected to field.; Points: Lancashire 3, Kent 20

10–13 May	Worcestershire	v	Kent (H)	Match drawn
Scorecard	618/7d (158.5 overs); Jason Holder 123* (110); Joey Evison 3/58 (26 overs)		407 (149.2 overs); Jack Leaning 179* (403); Joe Leach 3/37 (25 overs)	St Lawrence Ground, Canterbury; Umpires: Mike Burns and Ben Debenham
Scorecard			146/4 (57 overs) (f/o); Harry Finch 48* (116); Ben Gibbon 2/38 (10 overs)	St Lawrence Ground, Canterbury; Umpires: Mike Burns and Ben Debenham
Worcestershire win the toss and elected to bat.; Points: Kent 10, Worcestershire 13; Beyers Swanepoel played his first game for Kent.

17–20 May	Somerset (H)	v	Kent	Somerset won by 8 wickets
Scorecard	554 (120.1 overs); Tom Banton 133 (174); Joey Evison 3/92 (21.5 overs)		178 (48.1 overs); Joe Denly 61 (98); Craig Overton 3/38 (11 overs)	County Ground, Taunton; Umpires: Neil Mallender and Rob White
Scorecard	194/2 (44 overs); Matt Renshaw 82* (122); Beyers Swanepoel 1/35 (9 overs)		564 (126 overs) (f/o); Zak Crawley 238 (267); Migael Pretorius 3/110 (25 overs)	County Ground, Taunton; Umpires: Neil Mallender and Rob White
Kent won the toss and elected to field.; Points: Somerset 24, Kent 2

24–27 May	Essex	v	Kent (H)	Essex won by an innings and 96 runs
Scorecard	591/7d (142.4 overs); Jordan Cox 207 (255); 2/93 (29 overs)		394 (143.1 overs); Joe Denly 87 (179); Matt Critchley 5/88 (40.1 overs)	St Lawrence Ground, Canterbury; Umpires: Tom Lungley and Mark Newell
Scorecard			101 (57.2 overs) (f/o); Joe Denly 23 (73); Simon Harmer 4/32 (23 overs)	St Lawrence Ground, Canterbury; Umpires: Tom Lungley and Mark Newell
Essex won the toss and elected to bat.; Kent 3, Essex 21

23–26 June	Kent (H)	v	Lancashire	Lancashire won by an innings and 83 runs
Scorecard	244 (79.1 overs); Tawanda Muyeye 59 (121); George Balderson 3/38 (16 overs)		549/9d (150.4 overs); Josh Bohannon 205 (372); George Garrett 3/89 (20.4 overs)	St Lawrence Ground, Canterbury; Umpires: James Middlebrook and David Millns
Scorecard	222 (83.2 overs); Charlie Stobo 64 (151); Will Williams 3/26 (14.2 overs)			St Lawrence Ground, Canterbury; Umpires: James Middlebrook and David Millns
Lancashire won the toss and elected to field.; Points: Kent 1, Lancashire 23

30 June–3 July	Hampshire (H)	v	Kent	Hampshire won by 6 wickets
Scorecard	505/8d (130 overs); James Vince 211 (279); Joey Evison 4/83 (19 overs)		343 (99.3 overs); Jack Leaning 118 (228); Keith Barker 4/85 (24.3 overs)	Rose Bowl, Southampton; Umpires: Ben Debenham and Paul Pollard
Scorecard	180/4 (22.1 overs); Liam Dawson 56* (28); Matt Parkinson 2/48 (6 overs)		340 (118.2 overs) (f/o); Ben Compton 92 (210); Kyle Abbott 5/89 (24.3 overs)	Rose Bowl, Southampton; Umpires: Ben Debenham and Paul Pollard
Kent won the toss and elected to field.; Points: Hampshire 23, Kent 4; Feroze Khushi played his first game for Kent.

22–25 August	Kent	v	Worcestershire (H)	Worcestershire won by 8 wickets
Scorecard	171 (49.5); Tawanda Muyeye 56 (64); Joe Leach 6/52 (11.5 overs)		447 (15.1 overs); Brett D'Oliveira 97 (90); Akeem Jordan 5/97 (26.1 overs)	New Road, Worcester; Umpires: Mark Newell and Paul Pollard
Scorecard	376 (101.5 overs); Tawanda Muyeye 211 (279); Tom Taylor 4/99 (27 overs)		102/2 (24.3 overs); Kashif Ali 52* (67); George Garrett 1/15 (7 overs)	New Road, Worcester; Umpires: Mark Newell and Paul Pollard
Worcestershire won the toss and elected to field.; Points: Worcestershire 23, Kent 3; Akeem Jordan and Alfie Ogborne played their first games for Kent.

29 August–1 September	Warwickshire (H)	v	Kent	Warwickshire won by an innings and 21 runs
Scorecard	156 (39.5 overs); Ben Compton 70 (103); Michael Booth 3/13 (4 overs)		420 (107 overs); Will Rhodes 201 (295); George Garrett 3/75 (15 overs)	Edgbaston, Birmingham; Umpires: Peter Hartley and Alex Wharf
Scorecard	243 (69.3 overs); Daniel Bell-Drummond 78 (94); Oliver Hannon-Dalby 6/43 (19 overs)			Edgbaston, Birmingham; Umpires: Peter Hartley and Alex Wharf
Warwickshire won the toss and elected to bat.; Points: Warwickshire 23, Kent 3

9–12 September	Hampshire	v	Kent (H)	Match drawn
Scorecard	403 (106.3 overs); Tom Prest 102 (107); George Garrett 3/76 (21 overs)		207 (82.2 overs); Ben Compton 51 (146); Kyle Abbott 5/46 (16 overs)	St Lawrence Ground, Canterbury; Umpires: Ian Blackwell and Paul Pollard
Scorecard	24/1 (2.4 overs); James Vince 11 (10); George Garrett 1/17 (1.4 overs)		338 (102.4 overs) (f/o); Jack Leaning 100 (161); Kyle Abbott 4/66 (25 overs)	St Lawrence Ground, Canterbury; Umpires: Ian Blackwell and Paul Pollard
Kent won the toss and elected to field.; Points: Kent 11, Hampshire 15

17–20 September	Nottinghamshire	v	Kent (H)	Nottinghamshire won by 10 wickets
Scorecard	433 (106.4 overs); Ben Slater 160 (217); Nathan Gilchrist 4/101 (24 overs)		225 (55.3 overs); Joey Evison 76 (106); Farhan Ahmed	St Lawrence Ground, Canterbury; Umpires: James Middlebrook and Surendiran Shanmugam
Scorecard	28/0 (3.3 overs); Ben Slater 22* (8)		230 (64.1 overs) (f/o); Tawanda Muyeye 60 (59); Jacob Duffy 4/60 (17 overs)	St Lawrence Ground, Canterbury; Umpires: James Middlebrook and Surendiran Shanmugam
Kent won the toss and elected to field.; Points: Kent 3, Nottinghamshire 23

26–29 September	Durham (H)	v	Kent	Match drawn
Scorecard	360 (77.1 overs); Alex Lees 144 (180); Matt Parkinson 6/109 (24.1 overs)		353/8d (100 overs); Jack Leaning 84 (168); Bas de Leede 3/64 (18 overs)	Riverside Ground, Chester-le-Street; Umpires: Russell Warren and Rob White
Kent won the toss and elected to field.; No play was possible on days 1 or 2 due to rain.; Points: Durham 13, Kent 14

== One-Day Cup ==
=== Group A ===
Pos	Team	Pld	W	L	T	NR	Pts	NRR
1	Somerset	8	6	2	0	0	12	1.217
2	Worcestershire	8	5	3	0	0	10	0.564
3	Hampshire	8	5	3	0	0	10	0.191
4	Derbyshire	8	5	3	0	0	10	0.048
5	Durham	8	4	3	0	1	9	−0.048
6	Middlesex	8	3	4	0	1	7	−0.764
7	Kent	8	3	5	0	0	6	−0.619
8	Northamptonshire	8	2	6	0	0	4	0.231
9	Lancashire	8	2	6	0	0	4	−0.841

Source: ESPNcricinfo

26 July	Kent; 267 (49 overs)	v	Somerset (H); 270/7 (46.3 overs)	Somerset won by 3 wickets
Scorecard	Kent; 267 (49 overs)	v	Somerset (H); 270/7 (46.3 overs)	County Ground, Taunton; Umpires: Paul Baldwin and Ben Peverall
Scorecard	Joey Evison 55 (69); Lewis Goldsworthy 4/44 (10 overs)		Andrew Umeed 114*; Beyers Swanepoel 2/32 (7 overs)	County Ground, Taunton; Umpires: Paul Baldwin and Ben Peverall
Kent won the toss and elected to bat.; Points: Somerset 2, Kent 0; Ekansh Singh made his List A debut.				County Ground, Taunton; Umpires: Paul Baldwin and Ben Peverall

28 July	Kent (H); 209 (48.4 overs)	v	Lancashire; 204 (49.2 overs)	Kent won by 5 runs
Scorecard	Kent (H); 209 (48.4 overs)	v	Lancashire; 204 (49.2 overs)	Stanley Park, Blackpool; Umpires: Graham Lloyd and David Millns
Scorecard	Harry Finch 48 (63); Chris Green 3/38 (9.4 overs)		Keaton Jennings 107* (140); Matt Parkinson 4/30 (8.2 overs)	Stanley Park, Blackpool; Umpires: Graham Lloyd and David Millns
Lancashire won the toss and elected to field.; Points: Lancashire 0, Kent 2				Stanley Park, Blackpool; Umpires: Graham Lloyd and David Millns

31 July	Hampshire; 168 (41)	v	Kent (H); 170/6 (40.3 overs)	Kent won by 4 wickets
Scorecard	Hampshire; 168 (41)	v	Kent (H); 170/6 (40.3 overs)	County Cricket Ground, Beckenham; Umpires: Surendiran Shanmugam and Chris Watts
Scorecard	Kyle Abbott 37 (34); Beyers Swanepoel 3/28 (9 overs)		Harry Finch 53* (94); Kyle Abbott 3/16 (10 overs)	County Cricket Ground, Beckenham; Umpires: Surendiran Shanmugam and Chris Watts
Hampshire won the toss and elected to bat.; Points: Kent 2, Hampshire 0				County Cricket Ground, Beckenham; Umpires: Surendiran Shanmugam and Chris Watts

4 August	Kent (H); 204 (44.4 overs)	v	Middlesex; 206/5 (31.2 overs)	Middlesex won by 5 wickets
Scorecard	Kent (H); 204 (44.4 overs)	v	Middlesex; 206/5 (31.2 overs)	County Cricket Ground, Beckenham; Umpires: Ben Peverall and James Tredwell
Scorecard	Marcus O'Riordan 58 (46); Josh de Caires 2/25 (6 overs)		Joe Cracknell 88 (82); Grant Stewart 2/35 (6 overs)	County Cricket Ground, Beckenham; Umpires: Ben Peverall and James Tredwell
Kent won the toss and elected to bat.; Points: Kent 0, Middlesex 2				County Cricket Ground, Beckenham; Umpires: Ben Peverall and James Tredwell

7 August	Kent; 259 (47.3 overs)	v	Worcestershire (H); 260/7 (46.5 overs)	Worcestershire won by 3 wickets
Scorecard	Kent; 259 (47.3 overs)	v	Worcestershire (H); 260/7 (46.5 overs)	New Road, Worcester; Umpires: Nigel Llong and Simon Widdup
Scorecard	Grant Stewart 78 (60); Fateh Singh 3/51 (8 overs)		Jake Libby 75 (68); Grant Stewart 3/73 (10 overs)	New Road, Worcester; Umpires: Nigel Llong and Simon Widdup
Worcestershire won the toss and elected to field.; Points: Worcestershire 2, Kent 0				New Road, Worcester; Umpires: Nigel Llong and Simon Widdup

9 August	Derbyshire (H); 206 (46.3 overs)	v	Kent; 207/7 (45.2 overs)	Kent won by 3 wickets
Scorecard	Derbyshire (H); 206 (46.3 overs)	v	Kent; 207/7 (45.2 overs)	County Ground, Derby; Umpires: Phil Mustard and James Tredwell
Scorecard	Brooke Guest 85 (117); Matt Parkinson 3/23 (10 overs)		Jack Leaning 81* (117); Samit Patel 3/30 (10 overs)	County Ground, Derby; Umpires: Phil Mustard and James Tredwell
Kent won the toss and elected to field.; Points: Derbyshire 2, Kent 0				County Ground, Derby; Umpires: Phil Mustard and James Tredwell

11 August	Durham; 307 (50 overs)	v	Kent (H); 300/9 (50 overs)	Durham won by 7 runs
Scorecard	Durham; 307 (50 overs)	v	Kent (H); 300/9 (50 overs)	St Lawrence Ground, Canterbury; Umpires: Casper Viljoen and Chris Watts
Scorecard	Jaydn Denly 3/15 (3 overs); Ben McKinney 115 (116)		Harry Finch 104 (91); George Drissell 4/38 (10 overs)	St Lawrence Ground, Canterbury; Umpires: Casper Viljoen and Chris Watts
Durham won the toss and elected to bat.; Points: Kent 0, Durham 2				St Lawrence Ground, Canterbury; Umpires: Casper Viljoen and Chris Watts

14 August	Kent (H); 82 (35.1 overs)	v	Northamptonshire; 86/1 (14 overs)	Northamptonshire won by 9 wickets
Scorecard	Kent (H); 82 (35.1 overs)	v	Northamptonshire; 86/1 (14 overs)	St Lawrence Ground, Canterbury; Umpires: Ben Debenham and Surendiran Shanmugam
Scorecard	Jaydn Denly 22 (49); Yuzvendra Chahal 5/14 (10 overs)		James Sales 33* (37); Beyers Swanepoel 1/23 (4 overs)	St Lawrence Ground, Canterbury; Umpires: Ben Debenham and Surendiran Shanmugam
Kent won the toss and elected to bat.; Points: Kent 0, Northamptonshire 2				St Lawrence Ground, Canterbury; Umpires: Ben Debenham and Surendiran Shanmugam

== T20 Blast ==
=== South Group ===
Pos	Team	Pld	W	L	T	NR	Pts	NRR	Qualification
1	Surrey	14	9	3	1	1	20	0.777	Advanced to the Quarter-finals
2	Sussex Sharks	14	9	5	0	0	18	0.607	Advanced to the Quarter-finals
3	Somerset	14	8	5	0	1	17	0.497	Advanced to the Quarter-finals
4	Gloucestershire	14	7	6	1	0	15	0.503	Advanced to the Quarter-finals
5	Essex Eagles	14	7	6	0	1	15	0.201	
6	Glamorgan	14	6	7	0	1	13	−0.592	
7	Hampshire Hawks	14	4	7	0	3	11	−0.556	
8	Middlesex	14	3	8	0	3	9	−1.487	
9	Kent Spitfires	14	4	10	0	0	8	−0.486	

Source: Cricinfo

31 May	Kent; 205/8 (20 overs)	v	Middlesex (H); 107 (14.1 overs)	Kent won by 98 runs
8 Scorecard	Kent; 205/8 (20 overs)	v	Middlesex (H); 107 (14.1 overs)	County Ground, Chelmsford; Umpires: Neil Bainton and Ben Debenham
8 Scorecard	Joe Denly 56 (33); Blake Cullen 3/47 (4 overs)		Luke Hollman 23 (15); Matt Parkinson 4/25 (4 overs)	County Ground, Chelmsford; Umpires: Neil Bainton and Ben Debenham
Middlesex won the toss and elected to field.; Points: Middlesex 0, Kent 2.; Xavier Bartlett played his first game for Kent.				County Ground, Chelmsford; Umpires: Neil Bainton and Ben Debenham

2 June	Kent; 165/9 (20 overs)	v	Hampshire (H); 166/7 (19.5 overs)	Hampshire won by 3 wickets
Scorecard	Kent; 165/9 (20 overs)	v	Hampshire (H); 166/7 (19.5 overs)	Rose Bowl, Southampton; Umpires: Nigel Llong and Rob White
Scorecard	Sam Billings 43 (30); Chris Wood 2/19 (4 overs)		Joe Weatherley 49 (32); Joey Evison 3/31 (4 overs)	Rose Bowl, Southampton; Umpires: Nigel Llong and Rob White
Kent won the toss and elected to bat.; Points: Hampshire 2, Kent 0				Rose Bowl, Southampton; Umpires: Nigel Llong and Rob White

7 June	Somerset; 197/6 (20 overs)	v	Kent (H); 198/6 (19.2 overs)	Kent won by 4 wickets
Scorecard	Somerset; 197/6 (20 overs)	v	Kent (H); 198/6 (19.2 overs)	St Lawrence Ground, Canterbury; Umpires: Ian Blackwell and Ben Debenham
Scorecard	Will Smeed 68 (30); Matt Parkinson 2/36 (4 overs)		Sam Billings 106 (58); Jake Ball 2/14 (3 overs)	St Lawrence Ground, Canterbury; Umpires: Ian Blackwell and Ben Debenham
Kent won the toss and elected to field.; Points: Kent 2, Somerset 0				St Lawrence Ground, Canterbury; Umpires: Ian Blackwell and Ben Debenham

9 June	Kent (H); 173/8 (20 overs)	v	Middlesex; 178/6 (19.2 overs)	Middlesex won by 4 wickets
Scorecard	Kent (H); 173/8 (20 overs)	v	Middlesex; 178/6 (19.2 overs)	St Lawrence Ground, Canterbury; Umpires: Neil Bainton and Mark Newell
Scorecard	Daniel Bell-Drummond 60 (38); Luke Hollman 2/18 (4 overs)		Ryan Higgins 44 (29); Xavier Bartlett 3/34 (4 overs)	St Lawrence Ground, Canterbury; Umpires: Neil Bainton and Mark Newell
Middlesex won the toss and elected to field.; Points: Kent 0, Middlesex 2				St Lawrence Ground, Canterbury; Umpires: Neil Bainton and Mark Newell

14 June	Somerset (H); 55/6 (5 overs)	v	Kent; 46/5 (5 overs)	Somerset won by 14 runs (DLS method)
Scorecard	Somerset (H); 55/6 (5 overs)	v	Kent; 46/5 (5 overs)	County Ground, Taunton; Umpires: Ian Blackwell and Mark Newell
Scorecard	Tom Kohler-Cadmore 24 (9); Nathan Gilchrist 2/12 (1 over)		Sam Billings 16 (10); Ben Green 1/11 (1 over)	County Ground, Taunton; Umpires: Ian Blackwell and Mark Newell
Kent won the toss and elected to field.; The match was reduced to 5 overs per side.; Points: Somerset 2, Kent 0; Charlie Stobo played his first game for Kent.; Nathan Gilchrist made his T20 debut.				County Ground, Taunton; Umpires: Ian Blackwell and Mark Newell

16 June	Kent (H); 125 (19.5 overs)	v	Gloucestershire; 127/1 (11.4 overs)	Gloucestershire won by 8 wickets
Scorecard	Kent (H); 125 (19.5 overs)	v	Gloucestershire; 127/1 (11.4 overs)	St Lawrence Ground, Canterbury; Umpires: David Millns and Surendiran Shanmugam
Scorecard	Sam Billings 36 (26); Matt Taylor 3/30 (4 overs)		Miles Hammond 80 (41); Nathan Gilchrist 1/42 (3 overs)	St Lawrence Ground, Canterbury; Umpires: David Millns and Surendiran Shanmugam
Gloucestershire won the toss and elected to field.; Points: Kent 0, Gloucestershire 2				St Lawrence Ground, Canterbury; Umpires: David Millns and Surendiran Shanmugam

20 June	Sussex (H); 201/7 (20 overs)	v	Kent; 170/7 (20 overs)	Sussex won by 31 runs
Scorecard	Sussex (H); 201/7 (20 overs)	v	Kent; 170/7 (20 overs)	County Ground, Hove; Umpires: Neil Bainton and Chris Watts
Scorecard	Harrison Ward 61 (28); Matt Parkinson 3/31 (4 overs)		Sam Billings 51 (35); Danny Lamb 3/37 (4 overs)	County Ground, Hove; Umpires: Neil Bainton and Chris Watts
Kent won the toss and elected to field.; Points: Sussex 2, Kent 0				County Ground, Hove; Umpires: Neil Bainton and Chris Watts

21 June	Kent (H); 156/7 (20 overs)	v	Essex; 157/5 (15 overs)	Essex won by 5 wickets
Scorecard	Kent (H); 156/7 (20 overs)	v	Essex; 157/5 (15 overs)	St Lawrence Ground, Canterbury; Umpires: Martin Saggers and James Tredwell
Scorecard	Sam Billings 38 (20); Matt Critchley 2/28 (4 overs)		Michael Peppern 76 (42); Nathan Gilchrist 3/46 (3 overs)	St Lawrence Ground, Canterbury; Umpires: Martin Saggers and James Tredwell
Essex won the toss and elected to field.; Points: Kent 0, Essex 2				St Lawrence Ground, Canterbury; Umpires: Martin Saggers and James Tredwell

5 July	Kent; 150 (19.2 overs)	v	Gloucestershire (H); 29/2 (5 overs)	Kent won by 8 runs (DLS method)
Scorecard	Kent; 150 (19.2 overs)	v	Gloucestershire (H); 29/2 (5 overs)	College Ground, Cheltenham; Umpires: Ben Peverall and Alex Wharf
Scorecard	Daniel Bell-Drummond 76 (52); David Payne 4/25 (4 overs)		Miles Hammond 21* (20); Nathan Gilchrist 2/1 (1 over)	College Ground, Cheltenham; Umpires: Ben Peverall and Alex Wharf
Gloucestershire won the toss and elected to field.; No further play was possible due to rain.; Points: Gloucestershire 0, Kent 2; Tom Rogers played his first game for Kent.				College Ground, Cheltenham; Umpires: Ben Peverall and Alex Wharf

7 July	Surrey (H); 103/5 (10 overs)	v	Kent; 81/3 (8 overs)	Surrey won by 5 runs (DLS method)
Scorecard	Surrey (H); 103/5 (10 overs)	v	Kent; 81/3 (8 overs)	The Oval, London; Umpires: Neil Pratt and Martin Saggers
Scorecard	Laurie Evans 25 (13); Grant Stewart 2/24 (2 overs)		Feroze Khushi 35 (19); Reece Topley 2/27 (2 overs)	The Oval, London; Umpires: Neil Pratt and Martin Saggers
Kent won the toss and elected to field.; Kent were set a revised target of 87 runs in 8 overs due to rain.; Points: Surrey 2, Kent 0				The Oval, London; Umpires: Neil Pratt and Martin Saggers

11 July	Essex (H); 187/3 (20 overs)	v	Kent; 165/5 (20 overs)	Essex won by 22 runs
Scorecard	Essex (H); 187/3 (20 overs)	v	Kent; 165/5 (20 overs)	County Ground, Chelmsford; Umpires: Neil Bainton and Chris Watts
Scorecard	Paul Walter 46* (27); Matt Parkinson 2/29 (4 overs)		Tawanda Muyeye 73 (49); Shane Snater 2/25 (3 overs)	County Ground, Chelmsford; Umpires: Neil Bainton and Chris Watts
Kent won the toss and elected to field.; Points: Essex 2, Kent 0				County Ground, Chelmsford; Umpires: Neil Bainton and Chris Watts

12 July	Sussex; 203/4 (20 overs)	v	Kent (H); 115 (16.2 overs)	Sussex won by 88 runs
Scorecard	Sussex; 203/4 (20 overs)	v	Kent (H); 115 (16.2 overs)	St Lawrence Ground, Canterbury; Umpires: Neil Bainton and Jack Shantry
Scorecard	Tom Alsop 87* (41); Jas Singh 2/37 (4 overs)		Tawanda Muyeye 45 (26); James Coles 4/12 (4 overs)	St Lawrence Ground, Canterbury; Umpires: Neil Bainton and Jack Shantry
Kent won the toss and elected to field.; Points: Kent 0, Sussex 2				St Lawrence Ground, Canterbury; Umpires: Neil Bainton and Jack Shantry

16 July	Glamorgan; 145/6 (13 overs)	v	Kent (H); 132/5 (13 overs)	Glamorgan won by 13 runs
Scorecard	Glamorgan; 145/6 (13 overs)	v	Kent (H); 132/5 (13 overs)	St Lawrence Ground, Canterbury; Umpires: Rob Bailey and Ben Debenham; Player of the match: Marnus Labuschagne (Glamorgan)
Scorecard	Marnus Labuschagne 50* (26); Nathan Gilchrist 2/21 (3 overs)		Sam Billings 33 (17); Timm van der Gugten 2/26 (3 overs)	St Lawrence Ground, Canterbury; Umpires: Rob Bailey and Ben Debenham; Player of the match: Marnus Labuschagne (Glamorgan)
Kent won the toss and elected to field.; The match was reduced to 13 overs per side due to rain.; Points: Kent 0, Glamorgan 2				St Lawrence Ground, Canterbury; Umpires: Rob Bailey and Ben Debenham; Player of the match: Marnus Labuschagne (Glamorgan)

19 July	Kent (H); 217/5 (20 overs)	v	Surrey; 131 (16 overs)	Kent won by 86 runs
Scorecard	Kent (H); 217/5 (20 overs)	v	Surrey; 131 (16 overs)	St Lawrence Ground, Canterbury; Umpires: Nigel Llong and Chris Watts
Scorecard	Tawanda Muyeye 61 (31); Matt Dunn 2/40 (4 overs)		Sam Curran 24 (19); Matt Parkinson 3/23 (4 overs)	St Lawrence Ground, Canterbury; Umpires: Nigel Llong and Chris Watts
Surrey won the toss and elected to field.; Points: Kent 2, Surrey 0				St Lawrence Ground, Canterbury; Umpires: Nigel Llong and Chris Watts
