= 2024 T20 Blast =

English T20 Cricket tournament in 2024

2024 Vitality Blast
- Dates: 30 May – 14 September 2024
- Administrator: England and Wales Cricket Board
- Cricket format: Twenty20
- Tournament format(s): Group stage and knockout
- Host: England
- Champions: Gloucestershire (1st title)
- Participants: 18
- Matches: 133
- Most runs: Daniel Hughes (Sussex Sharks) (596)
- Most wickets: David Payne (Gloucestershire) (33)
- Official website: Vitality Blast

The 2024 T20 Blast (also known as 2024 Vitality Blast for sponsorship reasons) was the 22nd edition of the T20 Blast (currently known as the Vitality Blast), a professional Twenty20 cricket league played in England and Wales. The tournament ran from 30 May to 14 September 2024. The domestic T20 competition was run by the England and Wales Cricket Board (ECB) and was branded as the Vitality Blast due to the tournament's sponsorship. Somerset were the defending champions, having won their second title during the previous season. On 23 November 2023, the ECB announced the fixtures for the tournament.

Surrey and Sussex Sharks won their home quarter-finals, while Somesert and the Gloucestershire also secured a place at Finals day with away wins against Northamptonshire Steelbacks and Birmingham Bears respectively, thus producing an all South Group finals for second season running; and third in total. In the final, Gloucestershire beat Somerset by 8 wickets to win their first title after a 22-year wait.

== Format ==
The playing format is the same as the previous season, where groups remain the same with the familiar North and South split, while each county will play 14 group-stage matches, seven at home and seven away.

== Teams ==
The teams are divided into the following groups:

- North Group: Birmingham Bears, Derbyshire Falcons, Durham, Lancashire Lightning, Leicestershire Foxes, Northants Steelbacks, Notts Outlaws, Worcestershire Rapids, Yorkshire Vikings
- South Group: Essex Eagles, Glamorgan, Gloucestershire, Hampshire Hawks, Kent Spitfires, Middlesex, Somerset, Surrey, Sussex Sharks

== North Group ==
| Pos | Team | Pld | W | L | T | NR | Pts | NRR | Qualification |
|---|---|---|---|---|---|---|---|---|---|
| 1 | Birmingham Bears | 14 | 10 | 4 | 0 | 0 | 20 | 1.308 | Advanced to the Quarter-finals |
| 2 | Northants Steelbacks | 14 | 8 | 4 | 1 | 1 | 18 | −0.151 | Advanced to the Quarter-finals |
| 3 | Lancashire Lightning | 14 | 7 | 4 | 0 | 3 | 17 | 1.109 | Advanced to the Quarter-finals |
| 4 | Durham | 14 | 7 | 6 | 0 | 1 | 15 | −0.325 | Advanced to the Quarter-finals |
| 5 | Leicestershire Foxes | 14 | 6 | 6 | 1 | 1 | 14 | −0.119 | |
| 6 | Derbyshire Falcons | 14 | 6 | 7 | 0 | 1 | 13 | 0.112 | |
| 7 | Yorkshire Vikings | 14 | 6 | 7 | 0 | 1 | 13 | −0.035 | |
| 8 | Worcestershire Rapids | 14 | 4 | 10 | 0 | 0 | 8 | −0.192 | |
| 9 | Notts Outlaws | 14 | 3 | 9 | 0 | 2 | 8 | −1.699 | |

Source: Cricinfo

30 May 2024 (D/N)
Scorecard

| Durham; 75 (14.3 overs) | v | Lancashire Lightning; 76/1 (8 overs) |
| Matthew Potts 15 (14); Tom Aspinwall 4/18 (4 overs) | | Luke Wells 49* (25); Callum Parkinson 1/9 (1 over) |

Lancashire Lightning won by 9 wickets
Old Trafford, Manchester
Umpires: Peter Hartley and Steve O'Shaughnessy

- Lancashire Lightning won the toss and elected to field.
- Matthew Hurst and Tom Aspinwall (Lancashire Lightning) both made their T20 debut.

30 May 2024 (D/N)
Scorecard

| Derbyshire Falcons; 162/7 (20 overs) | v | Northants Steelbacks; 163/5 (20 overs) |
| David Lloyd 41 (22); David Willey 2/17 (4 overs) | | Ravi Bopara 56* (42); Pat Brown 3/33 (4 overs) |

Northants Steelbacks won by 5 wickets
County Cricket Ground, Northampton
Umpires: Rob Bailey and Ben Debenham

- Northants Steelbacks won the toss and elected to field.
- Raphael Weatherall (Northants Steelbacks) made his T20 debut.

30 May 2024 (D/N)
Scorecard

| Worcestershire Rapids; 101 (15.4 overs) | v | Yorkshire Vikings; 104/2 (11.4 overs) |
| Ethan Brookes 42 (32); Dan Moriarty 4/25 (4 overs) | | Adam Lyth 55* (33); Adam Finch 1/11 (2 overs) |

Yorkshire Vikings won by 8 wickets
Headingley, Leeds
Umpires: Neil Mallender and Surendiran Shanmugam

- Worcestershire Rapids won the toss and elected to bat.
- Ethan Brookes (Worcestershire Rapids) made his T20 debut.

31 May 2024 (D/N)
Scorecard

| Durham; 101 (18.1 overs) | v | Birmingham Bears; 105/4 (16.1 overs) |
| Michael Jones 29 (29); Hasan Ali 3/20 (3.1 overs) | | Rob Yates 29 (23); Ben Raine 1/21 (4 overs) |

Birmingham Bears won by 6 wickets
Riverside Ground, Chester-le-Street
Umpires: Neil Mallender and Neil Pratt

- Birmingham Bears won the toss and elected to field.

31 May 2024 (D/N)
Scorecard

| Yorkshire Vikings; 151/7 (20 overs) | v | Leicestershire Foxes; 155/3 (14.1 overs) |
| Shan Masood 45 (32); Josh Hull 3/28 (4 overs) | | Sol Budinger 50 (22); Jafer Chohan 2/32 (4 overs) |

Leicestershire Foxes won by 7 wickets
Grace Road, Leicester
Umpires: Hassan Adnan and Rob Bailey

- Leicestershire Foxes won the toss elected to field.

31 May 2024 (D/N)
Scorecard

| Notts Outlaws; 154 (19.2 overs) | v | Northants Steelbacks; 157/2 (13.2 overs) |
| Jack Haynes 51 (32); Saif Zaib 3/12 (3 overs) | | David Willey 79 (34); Dillon Pennington 1/37 (3 overs) |

Northants Steelbacks won by 8 wickets
Trent Bridge, Nottingham
Umpires: James Middlebrook and David Millns

- Northants Steelbacks won the toss and elected to field.

31 May 2024
Scorecard

| Lancashire Lightning; 169/5 (20 overs) | v | Worcestershire Rapids; 172/5 (19.3 overs) |
| Steven Croft 52* (33); Nathan Smith 2/32 (4 overs) | | Brett D'Oliveira 61 (47); Luke Wells 2/24 (4 overs) |

Worcestershire Rapids won by 5 wickets
New Road, Worcester
Umpires: Paul Pollard and Chris Watts

- Worcestershire Rapids won the toss and elected to field.

1 June 2024
Scorecard

| Leicestershire Foxes; 176/6 (20 overs) | v | Derbyshire Falcons; 178/6 (19.1 overs) |
| Peter Handscomb 75* (51); Samit Patel 2/21 (4 overs) | | Samit Patel 64 (32); Ben Mike 2/36 (4 overs) |

Derbyshire Falcons won by 4 wickets
Edgbaston, Birmingham
Umpires: Graham Lloyd and David Millns
Player of the match: Samit Patel (Derbyshire)

- Leicestershire Foxes won the toss and elected to bat.
- Mitch Wagstaff (Derbyshire) made his T20 debut.

1 June 2024 (D/N)
Scorecard

| Birmingham Bears; 149 (19.3 overs) | v | Notts Outlaws; 127 (19.2 overs) |
| Rob Yates 68 (48); Olly Stone 3/30 (4 overs) | | Matthew Montgomery 33 (31); Dan Mousley 3/22 (3.2 overs) |

Birmingham Bears won by 22 runs
Edgbaston, Birmingham
Umpires: Steve O'Shaughnessy and Paul Pollard
Player of the match: Danny Briggs (Birmingham Bears)

- Birmingham Bears won the toss and elected to bat.

2 June 2024
12:00
Scorecard

| Lancashire Lightning; 179/7 (20 overs) | v | Derbyshire Falcons; 122/ (17.4 overs) |
| Josh Bohannon 39 (24); Zak Chappell 3/38 (4 overs) | | Brooke Guest 42 (32); Chris Green 4/12 (3.4 overs) |

Lancashire Lightning won by 57 runs
Old Trafford, Manchester
Umpires: Steve O'Shaughnessy and Neil Pratt
Player of the match: Chris Green (Lancashire)

- Derbyshire Falcons won the toss and elected to field.

2 June 2024
Scorecard

| Yorkshire Vikings; 186/6 (20 overs) | v | Northants Steelbacks; 157/8 (20 overs) |
| Dawid Malan 41 (37); Ravi Bopara 4/34 (4 overs) | | Ricardo Vasconcelos 37 (26); Jordan Thompson 3/18 (4 overs) |

Yorkshire Vikings won by 29 runs
County Cricket Ground, Northampton
Umpires: Peter Hartley and Chris Watts

- Yorkshire Vikings won the toss and elected to bat.

6 June 2024 (D/N)
Scorecard

| Worcestershire Rapids; 154/8 (20 overs) | v | Notts Outlaws; 134/7 (20 overs) |
| Nathan Smith 51* (35); Ben Lister 2/20 (4 overs) | | Will Young 25 (27); Tom Taylor 2/23 (4 overs) |

Worcestershire Rapids won by 20 runs
Trent Bridge, Nottingham
Umpires: Hassan Adnan and Neil Pratt

- Worcestershire Rapids won the toss and elected to bat.

7 June 2024 (D/N)
Scorecard

| Derbyshire Falcons; 198/6 (20 overs) | v | Notts Outlaws; 102 (16.4 overs) |
| Wayne Madsen 53 (32); Olly Stone 3/42 (4 overs) | | Tom Moores 17 (14); Daryn Dupavillon 3/15 (3 overs) |

Derbyshire Falcons won by 96 runs
County Cricket Ground, Derby
Umpires: Steve O'Shaughnessy and Jack Shantry

- Notts Outlaws won the toss and elected to field.
- James Hayes (Nottinghamshire) made his T20 debut.

7 June 2024 (D/N)
Scorecard

| Lancashire Lightning; 176/8 (20 overs) | v | Birmingham Bears; 168/6 (20 overs) |
| Luke Wells 66 (32); Hasan Ali 3/47 (3 overs) | | Sam Hain 59 (44); Luke Wells 2/25 (4 overs) |

Lancashire Lightning won by 8 runs
Old Trafford, Manchester
Umpires: Peter Hartley and Tom Lungley

- Birmingham Bears won the toss and elected to field.

7 June 2024 (D/N)
Scorecard

| Leicestershire Foxes; 176/7 (20 overs) | v | Durham; 178/3 (19.3 overs) |
| Ben Cox 50* (31); Nathan Sowter 3/23 (4 overs) | | Alex Lees 71* (53); Rehan Ahmed 1/22 (4 overs) |

Durham won by 7 wickets
Grace Road, Leicester
Umpires: Graham Lloyd and Neil Mallender

- Durham won the toss and elected to field.

7 June 2024 (D/N)
Scorecard

| Northants Steelbacks; 169/4 (20 overs) | v | Worcestershire Rapids; 163/9 (20 overs) |
| Saif Zaib 44* (21); Shoaib Bashir 2/38 (4 overs) | | Gareth Roderick 39 (22); Saif Zaib 3/20 (4 overs) |

Northants Steelbacks won by 6 runs
County Cricket Ground, Northampton
Umpires: James Middlebrook and Russell Warren
Player of the match: Saif Zaib (Northants Steelbacks)

- Northants Steelbacks won the toss and elected to bat.

8 June 2024 (D/N)
Scorecard

| Durham; 194/9 (20 overs) | v | Birmingham Bears; 168 (18.4 overs) |
| David Bedingham 63 (27); George Garton 3/41 (4 overs) | | Jacob Bethell 50 (32); Ben Raine 5/21 (3.4 overs) |

Durham won by 26 runs
Edgbaston, Birmingham
Umpires: Rob Bailey and Sue Redfern

- Durham won the toss and elected to bat.

9 June 2024
Scorecard

| Leicestershire Foxes; 176/8 (20 overs) | v | Worcestershire Rapids; 172/6 (20 overs) |
| Rishi Patel 48 (42); Nathan Smith 3/39 (4 overs) | | Matthew Waite 40 (36); Scott Currie 2/22 (3 overs) |

Leicestershire Foxes won by 4 runs
Grace Road, Leicester
Umpires: Tom Lungley and Chris Watts

- Worcestershire Rapids won the toss and elected to field.

9 June 2024
Scorecard

| Notts Outlaws; 153/8 (20 overs) | v | Lancashire Lightning; 155/4 (18.3 overs) |
| Jack Haynes 45 (36); Chris Green 2/16 (4 overs) | | Keaton Jennings 64 (49); Liam Patterson-White 1/22 (4 overs) |

Lancashire Lightning won by 6 wickets
Trent Bridge, Nottingham
Umpires: Graham Lloyd and Steve O'Shaughnessy

- Notts Outlaws won the toss and elected to bat.
- Jack Morley (Lancashire Lightning) and Liam Patterson-White (Notts Outlaws) both made their T20 debut.

9 June 2024
Scorecard

| Derbyshire Falcons; 179/6 (20 overs) | v | Yorkshire Vikings; 182/1 (18.1 overs) |
| Aneurin Donald 84 (41); Joe Root 2/20 (3 overs) | | Adam Lyth 84 (51); Daryn Dupavillon 1/31 (4 overs) |

Yorkshire Vikings won by 9 wickets
Headingley, Leeds
Umpires: James Middlebrook and Neil Pratt

- Yorkshire Vikings won the toss and elected to field.
- Ben Cliff (Yorkshire Vikings) made his T20 debut.

12 June 2024 (D/N)
Scorecard

| Leicestershire Foxes; 140/8 (20 overs) | v | Durham; 130/8 (20 overs) |
| Rishi Patel 48 (44); Matthew Potts 3/20 (4 overs) | | Graham Clark 53* (56); Wiaan Mulder 2/19 (4 overs) |

Leicestershire Foxes won by 10 runs
Riverside Ground, Chester-le-Street
Umpires: Peter Hartley and Paul Pollard

- Durham won the toss and elected to field.

14 June 2024 (D/N)
Scorecard

| Yorkshire Vikings; 145 (19.5 overs) | v | Birmingham Bears; 151/6 (18.1 overs) |
| Joe Root 39 (27); Jake Lintott 3/15 (2 overs) | | Sam Hain 53* (40); Jordan Thompson 4/31 (4 overs) |

Birmingham Bears won by 4 wickets
Edgbaston, Birmingham
Umpires: Tom Lungley and Paul Pollard
Player of the match: Sam Hain (Birmingham Bears)

- Birmingham Bears won the toss and elected to field.

14 June 2024 (D/N)
Scorecard

| Northants Steelbacks; 193/8 (20 overs) | v | Derbyshire Falcons; 123/3 (11 overs) |
| Matthew Breetzke 94 (54); Daryn Dupavillon 3/43 (4 overs) | | Aneurin Donald 68 (26); Freddie Heldreich 2/34 (3 overs) |

Derbyshire Falcons won by 24 runs (DLS method)
County Cricket Ground, Derby
Umpires: Neil Mallender and Neil Pratt

- Derbyshire Falcons won the toss and elected to field.
- Rain prevented any further play.
- Derbyshire Falcons were 24 runs ahead of the DLS par score of 99 runs from 11 overs.

14 June 2024 (D/N)
Scorecard

| Lancashire Lightning; 162 (18.5 overs) | v | Leicestershire Foxes; 137/9 (20 overs) |
| Luke Wells 35 (18); Scott Currie 4/25 (3.5 overs) | | Rishi Patel 43 (31); George Balderson 2/15 (2 overs) |

Lancashire Lightning won by 25 runs
Grace Road, Leicester
Umpires: Peter Hartley and Sue Redfern

- Leicestershire Foxes won the toss and elected to field.
- George Balderson (Lancashire Lightning) made his T20 debut.

14 June 2024
Scorecard

| Worcestershire Rapids; 141/6 (20 overs) | v | Notts Outlaws; 100/3 (15 overs) |
| Adam Hose 43 (35); Calvin Harrison 2/22 (4 overs) | | Alex Hales 50* (37); Hayden Walsh 2/16 (2 overs) |

Notts Outlaws won by 1 run (DLS method)
New Road, Worcester
Umpires: Rob Bailey and Russell Warren

- Notts Outlaws won the toss and elected to field.
- Rain prevented any further play.
- Notts Outlaws were 1 run ahead of the DLS par score of 99 runs from 15 overs.

15 June 2024
Scorecard

| Durham; 58/0 (5 overs) | v | Notts Outlaws |
| Graham Clark 31* (15) |

No result
Trent Bridge, Nottingham
Umpires: Paul Baldwin and James Middlebrook

- Notts Outlaws won the toss and elected to field.
- The match was reduced to 17 overs per side due to rain.
- Rain prevented any further play.
- Benjamin Martindale (Notts Outlaws) made his T20 debut.

16 June 2024
Scorecard

| Derbyshire Falcons; 133/7 (20 overs) | v | Birmingham Bears; 136/3 (18.5 overs) |
| David Lloyd 50 (38); Richard Gleeson 2/25 (4 overs) | | Dan Mousley 66* (53); Pat Brown 2/25 (4 overs) |

Birmingham Bears won by 7 wickets
County Cricket Ground, Derby
Umpires: Rob Bailey and Sue Redfern

- Derbyshire Falcons won the toss and elected to bat.

16 June 2024
Scorecard

| Durham; 218/3 (20 overs) | v | Lancashire Lightning; 216/8 (20 overs) |
| Graham Clark 87 (57); Saqib Mahmood 1/47 (4 overs) | | Chris Green 38 (18); Callum Parkinson 3/31 (4 overs) |

Durham won by 2 runs
Riverside Ground, Chester-le-Street
Umpires: Tom Lungley and Steve O'Shaughnessy

- Durham won the toss and elected to bat.

16 June 2024
Scorecard

| Worcestershire Rapids; 143/6 (20 overs) | v | Northants Steelbacks; 132/7 (20 overs) |
| Matthew Breetzke 52 (43); Adam Finch 2/31 (4 overs) | | Ethan Brookes 42 (32); Ben Sanderson 3/16 (4 overs) |

Northants Steelbacks won by 11 runs
New Road, Worcester
Umpires: Paul Baldwin and Ian Blackwell

- Northants Steelbacks won the toss and elected to bat.

16 June 2024
Scorecard

| Yorkshire Vikings; 166 (19.5 overs) | v | Leicestershire Foxes; 146/9 (20 overs) |
| Rishi Patel 64 (47); Dan Moriarty 2/43 (4 overs) | | Dawid Malan 32 (23); Scott Currie 3/19 (4 overs) |

Leicestershire Foxes won by 20 runs
Headingley, Leeds
Umpires: Graham Lloyd and Neil Pratt

- Leicestershire Foxes won the toss and elected to bat.

20 June 2024 (D/N)
Scorecard

| Birmingham Bears; 219/4 (20 overs) | v | Northants Steelbacks; 129/9 (20 overs) |
| Jacob Bethell 56* (16); Ravi Bopara 2/21 (4 overs) | | Ravi Bopara 34 (28); George Garton 2/23 (2 overs) |

Birmingham Bears won by 90 runs
Edgbaston, Birmingham
Umpires: Steve O'Shaughnessy and Paul Pollard

- Birmingham Bears won the toss and elected to bat.

20 June 2024 (D/N)
Scorecard

| Yorkshire Vikings; 173/8 (20 overs) | v | Lancashire Lightning; 166/8 (20 overs) |
| Shan Masood 61 (41); Saqib Mahmood 3/41 (4 overs) | | Keaton Jennings 46 (24); Jordan Thompson 2/49 (4 overs) |

Yorkshire Vikings won by 7 runs
Headingley, Leeds
Umpires: Graham Lloyd and James Middlebrook
Player of the match: Shan Masood (Yorkshire Vikings)

- Yorkshire Vikings won the toss and elected to bat.

21 June 2024 (D/N)
Scorecard

| Durham; 170/6 (20 overs) | v | Yorkshire Vikings; 167/7 (20 overs) |
| Graham Clark 49 (35); Jordan Thompson 2/36 (4 overs) | | Adam Lyth 54 (40); Nathan Sowter 2/31 (4 overs) |

Durham won by 3 runs
Riverside Ground, Chester-le-Street
Umpires: Neil Mallender and Neil Pratt

- Durham won the toss and elected to bat.

21 June 2024 (D/N)
Scorecard

| Northants Steelbacks; 208/5 (20 overs) | v | Leicestershire Foxes; 208/7 (20 overs) |
| David Willey 71 (48); Josh Hull 2/38 (4 overs) | | Rishi Patel 104 (45); Raphael Weatherall 4/50 (4 overs) |

Match tied
County Cricket Ground, Northampton
Umpires: Nigel Llong and Jack Shantry

- Northants Steelbacks won the toss and elected to bat.

21 June 2024 (D/N)
Scorecard

| Notts Outlaws; 173/5 (20 overs) | v | Derbyshire Falcons; 165/8 (20 overs) |
| Joe Clarke 47 (28); Pat Brown 2/39 (4 overs) | | Aneurin Donald 52 (26); Liam Patterson-White 2/41 (4 overs) |

Notts Outlaws won by 8 runs
Trent Bridge, Nottingham
Umpires: Graham Lloyd and Steve O'Shaughnessy

- Notts Outlaws won the toss and elected to bat.

21 June 2024
Scorecard

| Worcestershire Rapids; 155/7 (20 overs) | v | Birmingham Bears; 159/5 (17.5 overs) |
| Rob Jones 26* (21); Danny Briggs 2/22 (4 overs) | | Sam Hain 76 (53); Tom Taylor 3/36 (3.5 overs) |

Birmingham Bears won by 5 wickets
New Road, Worcester
Umpires: Tom Lungley and Russell Warren

- Birmingham Bears won the toss and elected to field.

5 July 2024 (D/N)
Scorecard

| Durham; 190/5 (20 overs) | v | Worcestershire Rapids; 168 (19.5 overs) |
| Ollie Robinson 41 (30); Brett D'Oliveira 2/28 (3 overs) | | Kashif Ali 45 (25); Ben Raine 3/30 (4 overs) |

Durham won by 22 runs
Riverside Ground, Chester-le-Street
Umpires: Steve O'Shaughnessy and Simon Widdup

- Durham won the toss and elected to bat.

5 July 2024 (D/N)
Scorecard

| Northants Steelbacks | v | Lancashire Lightning |

Match abandoned
County Cricket Ground, Northampton

- No toss.
- No play was possible due to rain.

5 July 2024 (D/N)
Scorecard

| Notts Outlaws; 175/5 (17 overs) | v | Leicestershire Foxes |
| Joe Clarke 79 (41); Lewis Goldsworthy 3/36 (4 overs) |

No result
Trent Bridge, Nottingham
Umpires: Naeem Ashraf and Neil Mallender

- Leicestershire Foxes won the toss and elected to field.
- Rain prevented any further play.
- Sam Wood (Leicestershire Foxes) made his T20 debut.

5 July 2024 (D/N)
Scorecard

| Birmingham Bears; 214/7 (20 overs) | v | Yorkshire Vikings; 210/5 (20 overs) |
| Sam Hain 98* (48); Dan Moriarty 2/35 (4 overs) | | Donovan Ferreira 66 (32); Danny Briggs 3/35 (4 overs) |

Birmingham Bears won by 4 runs
Headingley, Leeds
Umpires: Peter Hartley and Surendiran Shanmugam

- Birmingham Bears won the toss and elected to bat.

6 July 2024 (D/N)
Scorecard

| Leicestershire Foxes; 184/6 (20 overs) | v | Derbyshire Falcons; 188/6 (19.2 overs) |
| Ben Cox 61* (30); Zak Chappell 3/42 (4 overs) | | Samit Patel 67* (44); Josh Hull 2/25 (3.2 overs) |

Derbyshire Falcons won by 4 wickets
Grace Road, Leicester
Umpires: Graham Lloyd and Simon Widdup

- Derbyshire Falcons won the toss and elected to field.

7 July 2024
Scorecard

| Yorkshire Vikings; 130/9 (20 overs) | v | Derbyshire Falcons; 131/3 (15 overs) |
| Donovan Ferreira 44 (32); Alex Thomson 3/26 (4 overs) | | David Lloyd 50 (32); Matt Revis 1/18 (1 over) |

Derbyshire Falcons won by 7 wickets
Queen's Park, Chesterfield
Umpires: Richard Kettleborough and Graham Lloyd

- Derbyshire Falcons won the toss and elected to field.

7 July 2024
Scorecard

| Worcestershire Rapids; 181/4 (20 overs) | v | Lancashire Lightning; 182/8 (19.5 overs) |
| Josh Cobb 74 (53); Saqib Mahmood 2/30 (4 overs) | | Tom Bruce 50* (36); Matthew Waite 3/19 (3 overs) |

Lancashire Lightning won by 2 wickets
Old Trafford, Manchester
Umpires: Naeem Ashraf and Neil Mallender

- Lancashire Lightning won the toss and elected to field.
- Harry Darley (Worcestershire Rapids) made his T20 debut.

7 July 2024
Scorecard

| Durham; 140 (20 overs) | v | Northants Steelbacks; 141/5 (19.4 overs) |
| Colin Ackermann 70 (52); Ben Sanderson 4/15 (4 overs) | | Ricardo Vasconcelos 41 (33); Nathan Sowter 2/17 (4 overs) |

Northants Steelbacks won by 5 wickets
County Cricket Ground, Northampton
Umpires: Ben Debenham and James Tredwell

- Northants Steelbacks won the toss and elected to field.

7 July 2024
Scorecard

| Notts Outlaws; 57 (17.2 overs) | v | Birmingham Bears; 61/1 (5.2 overs) |
| Lyndon James 15 (23); Moeen Ali 2/2 (1.2 overs) | | Robert Yates 35* (20); Fazalhaq Farooqi 1/31 (3 overs) |

Birmingham Bears won by 9 wickets
Trent Bridge, Nottingham
Umpires: Peter Hartley and Simon Widdup

- Birmingham Bears won the toss and elected to field.

11 July 2024 (D/N)
Scorecard

| Derbyshire Falcons | v | Lancashire Lightning |

Match abandoned
County Cricket Ground, Derby

- No toss.
- No play was possible due to rain.

11 July 2024 (D/N)
Scorecard

| Worcestershire Rapids; 184/8 (20 overs) | v | Leicestershire Foxes; 168 (19.5 overs) |
| Adam Hose 63 (39); Lewis Goldsworthy 2/25 (4 overs) | | Ben Cox 55 (40); Matthew Waite 5/21 (3.5 overs) |

Worcestershire Rapids won by 16 runs
New Road, Worcester
Umpires: Anthony Harris and Alex Wharf

- Leicestershire Foxes won the toss and elected to field.

11 July 2024 (D/N)
Scorecard

| Durham; 107 (16.4 overs) | v | Yorkshire Vikings; 108/3 (16.4 overs) |
| Ben Raine 33 (28); Jafer Chohan 5/14 (3.4 overs) | | Adam Lyth 30 (23); Bas de Leede 1/2 (1 over) |

Yorkshire Vikings won by 7 wickets
Headingley, Leeds
Umpires: Richard Kettleborough and Neil Mallender

- Durham won the toss and elected to bat.

12 July 2024 (D/N)
Scorecard

| Worcestershire Rapids; 187/6 (17 overs) | v | Birmingham Bears; 132 (15.2 overs) |
| Kashif Ali 46 (30); Danny Briggs 2/25 (3 overs) | | Dan Mousley 68 (44); Tom Taylor 3/31 (4 overs) |

Worcestershire Rapids won by 55 runs
Edgbaston, Birmingham
Umpires: Graham Lloyd and Surendiran Shanmugam

- Worcestershire Rapids won the toss and elected to bat.
- The match was reduced to 17 overs per side due to rain.

12 July 2024 (D/N)
Scorecard

| Durham; 160/6 (20 overs) | v | Notts Outlaws; 130/9 (20 overs) |
| Ashton Turner 44* (31); Lyndon James 3/31 (4 overs) | | Matthew Montgomery 30 (24); Callum Parkinson 3/15 (4 overs) |

Durham won by 30 runs
Riverside Ground, Chester-le-Street
Umpires: Neil Mallender and Neil Pratt

- Notts Outlaws won the toss and elected to field.

12 July 2024 (D/N)
Scorecard

| Lancashire Lightning | v | Yorkshire Vikings |

Match abandoned
Old Trafford, Manchester
Umpires: Alex Wharf and Rob White

- No toss.
- No play was possible due to rain.

12 July 2024 (D/N)
Scorecard

| Northants Steelbacks; 183/7 (20 overs) | v | Leicestershire Foxes; 186/7 (19.1 overs) |
| Ravi Bopara 61 (44); Ben Mike 3/17 (3 overs) | | James Neesham 67 (34); David Willey 2/18 (4 overs) |

Leicestershire Foxes won by 3 wickets
Grace Road, Leicester
Umpires: Naeem Ashraf and Paul Pollard

- Leicestershire Foxes won the toss and elected to field.

14 July 2024
Scorecard

| Birmingham Bears; 198/2 (20 overs) | v | Derbyshire Falcons; 154 (19.2 overs) |
| Dan Mousley 60* (44); Pat Brown 1/33 (4 overs) | | Aneurin Donald 30 (19); Danny Briggs 3/24 (4 overs) |

Birmingham Bears won by 44 runs
Edgbaston, Birmingham
Umpires: Richard Kettleborough and Rob White

- Derbyshire Falcons won the toss and elected to field.

14 July 2024
Scorecard

| Durham; 90/5 (8 overs) | v | Northants Steelbacks; 91/4 (7.1 overs) |
| Ashton Turner 36* (17); Jack White 1/5 (2 overs) | | Ashton Agar 31 (14); Nathan Sowter 2/12 (2 overs) |

Northants Steelbacks won by 6 wickets
Riverside Ground, Chester-le-Street
Umpires: Paul Pollard and Neil Pratt

- Northants Steelbacks won the toss and elected to field.
- The match was reduced to 8 overs per side due to rain.
- Jack White (Northants Steelbacks) made his T20 debut.

14 July 2024
Scorecard

| Notts Outlaws; 160/6 (20 overs) | v | Leicestershire Foxes; 161/5 (19 overs) |
| Benjamin Martindale 44 (42); Scott Currie 2/35 (4 overs) | | Lewis Goldsworthy 67 (39); Olly Stone 2/22 (4 overs) |

Leicestershire Foxes won by 5 wickets
Grace Road, Leicester
Umpires: Paul Baldwin and Graham Lloyd

- Notts Outlaws won the toss and elected to bat.

14 July 2024
Scorecard

| Worcestershire Rapids; 205/6 (20 overs) | v | Yorkshire Vikings; 208/4 (19.3 overs) |
| Ethan Brookes 44 (21); Jafer Chohan 4/30 (4 overs) | | Dawid Malan 93* (50); Ethan Brookes 4/41 (4 overs) |

Yorkshire Vikings won by 6 wickets
New Road, Worcester
Umpires: Anthony Harris and Richard Illingworth

- Yorkshire Vikings won the toss and elected to field.

17 July 2024 (D/N)
Scorecard

| Notts Outlaws; 131/7 (20 overs) | v | Lancashire Lightning; 136/2 (14.3 overs) |
| Lyndon James 51 (38); Luke Wood 3/23 (4 overs) | | Phil Salt 70 (42); Liam Patterson-White 1/13 (3 overs) |

Lancashire Lightning won by 8 wickets
Old Trafford, Manchester
Umpires: David Millns and Steve O'Shaughnessy

- Lancashire Lightning won the toss and elected to field.

18 July 2024 (D/N)
Scorecard

| Northants Steelbacks; 197/6 (20 overs) | v | Birmingham Bears; 186/6 (20 overs) |
| Saif Zaib 86 (41); Danny Briggs 2/38 (4 overs) | | Sam Hain 93 (60); David Willey 2/34 (4 overs) |

Northants Steelbacks won by 11 runs
County Cricket Ground, Northampton
Umpires: Paul Pollard and Chris Watts

- Birmingham Bears won the toss and elected to field.

18 July 2024 (D/N)
Scorecard

| Worcestershire Rapids; 169/8 (20 overs) | v | Derbyshire Falcons; 170/5 (20 overs) |
| Ed Pollock 67 (47); Pat Brown 4/23 (4 overs) | | Wayne Madsen 44 (40); Harry Darley 2/26 (4 overs) |

Derbyshire Falcons won by 5 wickets
New Road, Worcester
Umpires: Anthony Harris and Richard Illingworth

- Derbyshire Falcons won the toss and elected to field.
- Henry Cullen and Jack Home (Worcestershire Rapids) both made their T20 debut.

19 July 2024 (D/N)
Scorecard

| Birmingham Bears; 194/5 (20 overs) | v | Leicestershire Foxes; 122 (16.4 overs) |
| Moeen Ali 103 (59); Josh Hull 2/34 (4 overs) | | Lewis Goldsworthy 35 (24); Danny Briggs 3/30 (4 overs) |

Birmingham Bears won by 72 runs
Edgbaston, Birmingham
Umpires: Paul Pollard and Richard Illingworth
Player of the match: Moeen Ali (Birmingham Bears)

- Birmingham Bears won the toss and elected to bat.

19 July 2024 (D/N)
Scorecard

| Derbyshire Falcons; 155/8 (20 overs) | v | Durham; 159/2 (18.5 overs) |
| Wayne Madsen 22 (15); Nathan Sowter 2/18 (4 overs) | | Alex Lees 72* (60); Pat Brown 1/28 (4 overs) |

Durham won by 8 wickets
County Cricket Ground, Derby
Umpires: Hassan Adnan and David Millns

- Durham won the toss and elected to field.

19 July 2024 (D/N)
Scorecard

| Lancashire Lightning; 201/9 (20 overs) | v | Northants Steelbacks; 203/6 (18.1 overs) |
| George Dockrell 45 (25); Jack White 3/16 (2 overs) | | Matthew Breetzke 76 (31); Luke Wells 2/23 (4 overs) |

Northants Steelbacks won by 4 wickets
Old Trafford, Manchester
Umpires: Graham Lloyd and Steve O'Shaughnessy

- Northants Steelbacks won the toss and elected to field.

19 July 2024 (D/N)
Scorecard

| Notts Outlaws; 209/9 (20 overs) | v | Yorkshire Vikings; 181/6 (20 overs) |
| Jack Haynes 50 (21); Benjamin Cliff 4/31 (4 overs) | | James Wharton 52 (46); Calvin Harrison 2/19 (4 overs) |

Notts Outlaws won by 28 runs
Headingley, Leeds
Umpires: Peter Hartley and Richard Kettleborough

- Yorkshire Vikings won the toss and elected to field.
- Freddie McCann and Sam King (Notts Outlaws) both made their T20 debut.

== South Group ==
| Pos | Team | Pld | W | L | T | NR | Pts | NRR | Qualification |
|---|---|---|---|---|---|---|---|---|---|
| 1 | Surrey | 14 | 9 | 3 | 1 | 1 | 20 | 0.777 | Advanced to the Quarter-finals |
| 2 | Sussex Sharks | 14 | 9 | 5 | 0 | 0 | 18 | 0.607 | Advanced to the Quarter-finals |
| 3 | Somerset | 14 | 8 | 5 | 0 | 1 | 17 | 0.497 | Advanced to the Quarter-finals |
| 4 | Gloucestershire | 14 | 7 | 6 | 1 | 0 | 15 | 0.503 | Advanced to the Quarter-finals |
| 5 | Essex Eagles | 14 | 7 | 6 | 0 | 1 | 15 | 0.201 | |
| 6 | Glamorgan | 14 | 6 | 7 | 0 | 1 | 13 | −0.592 | |
| 7 | Hampshire Hawks | 14 | 4 | 7 | 0 | 3 | 11 | −0.556 | |
| 8 | Middlesex | 14 | 3 | 8 | 0 | 3 | 9 | −1.487 | |
| 9 | Kent Spitfires | 14 | 4 | 10 | 0 | 0 | 8 | −0.486 | |

Source: Cricinfo

30 May 2024 (D/N)
Scorecard

| Essex Eagles; 141/9 (20 overs) | v | Gloucestershire; 142/5 (17 overs) |
| Jordan Cox 48 (27); Matthew Taylor 4/22 (4 overs) | | James Bracey 49 (30); Luc Benkenstein 2/24 (3 overs) |

Gloucestershire won by 5 wickets
County Ground, Bristol
Umpires: Paul Baldwin and Jack Shantry

- Gloucestershire won the toss and elected to field.
- Luc Benkenstein (Essex Eagles) made his T20 debut.

30 May 2024 (D/N)
Scorecard

| Hampshire Hawks; 162/9 (20 overs) | v | Surrey; 163/5 (19.2 overs) |
| Toby Albert 46 (32); Tom Curran 3/32 (4 overs) | | Tom Curran 37* (20); Michael Neser 2/33 (4 overs) |

Surrey won by 5 wickets
Rose Bowl, Southampton
Umpires: Nigel Llong and Mark Newell

- Surrey won the toss and elected to field.

31 May 2024 (D/N)
Scorecard

| Surrey; 200/8 (20 overs) | v | Glamorgan; 181/7 (20 overs) |
| Jamie Smith 76 (38); Dan Douthwaite 2/26 (4 overs) | | Marnus Labuschagne 58 (34); Jordan Clark 2/27 (4 overs) |

Surrey won by 19 runs
Sophia Gardens, Cardiff
Umpires: Tom Lungley and Jack Shantry

- Glamorgan won the toss and elected to field.

31 May 2024 (D/N)
Scorecard

| Kent Spitfires; 205/8 (20 overs) | v | Middlesex; 107 (14.1 overs) |
| Joe Denly 56 (33); Luke Hollman 3/27 (4 overs) | | Luke Hollman 23 (15); Matt Parkinson 4/25 (4 overs) |

Kent Spitfires won by 98 runs
County Ground, Chelmsford
Umpires: Neil Bainton and Ben Debenham

- Middlesex won the toss and elected to field.
- Noah Cornwell (Middlesex) made his T20 debut.

31 May 2024 (D/N)
Scorecard

| Essex Eagles; 193/6 (20 overs) | v | Somerset; 197/6 (19.1 overs) |
| Dean Elgar 77 (51); Lewis Gregory 3/42 (4 overs) | | Tom Abell 55 (36); Aaron Beard 2/11 (3 overs) |

Somerset won by 4 wickets
County Ground, Taunton
Umpires: Ian Blackwell and Rob White
Player of the match: Lewis Gregory (Somerset)

- Somerset won the toss and elected to field.

31 May 2024 (D/N)
Scorecard

| Gloucestershire; 167/8 (20 overs) | v | Sussex Sharks; 168/7 (20 overs) |
| Jack Taylor 52 (35); Tymal Mills 4/25 (4 overs) | | Fynn Hudson-Prentice 47 (36); Matthew Taylor 3/32 (4 overs) |

Sussex Sharks won by 3 wickets
County Ground, Hove
Umpires: Nigel Llong and Mark Newell

- Sussex Sharks won the toss and elected to field.
- Jack Carson (Sussex Sharks) made his T20 debut.

2 June 2024
Scorecard

| Middlesex; 203/7 (20 overs) | v | Essex Eagles; 207/6 (17.4 overs) |
| Max Holden 85* (42); Paul Walter 2/28 (3 overs) | | Michael Pepper 101 (44); Luke Hollman 2/50 (4 overs) |

Essex Eagles won by 4 wickets
County Ground, Chelmsford
Umpires: Neil Bainton and Mark Newell

- Essex Eagles won the toss and elected to field.

2 June 2024
Scorecard

| Glamorgan; 183/7 (20 overs) | v | Sussex Sharks; 158/6 (20 overs) |
| Sam Northeast 61* (43); Tymal Mills 4/33 (4 overs) | | James Coles 69* (49); Mason Crane 2/22 (4 overs) |

Glamorgan won by 25 runs
Sophia Gardens, Cardiff
Umpires: Mike Burns and David Millns

- Glamorgan won the toss and elected to bat.

2 June 2024
Scorecard

| Kent Spitfires; 165/9 (20 overs) | v | Hampshire Hawks; 166/7 (19.5 overs) |
| Sam Billings 43 (30); Chris Wood 2/19 (4 overs) | | Joe Weatherley 49 (32); Joey Evison 3/31 (4 overs) |

Hampshire Hawks won by 3 wickets
Rose Bowl, Southampton
Umpires: Nigel Llong and Rob White

- Kent Spitfires won the toss and elected to bat.

2 June 2024
Scorecard

| Surrey; 163 (19 overs) | v | Somerset; 106 (15.4 overs) |
| Jamie Smith 87 (38); Ben Green 4/32 (4 overs) | | Tom Kohler-Cadmore 25 (10); Sean Abbott 3/8 (3 overs) |

Surrey won by 57 runs
The Oval, London
Umpires: Rob Bailey and Jack Shantry

- Somerset won the toss and elected to field.

6 June 2024 (D/N)
Scorecard

| Middlesex; 173 (20 overs) | v | Glamorgan; 177/7 (18.2 overs) |
| Martin Andersson 57 (34); Mason Crane 3/28 (3 overs) | | Sam Northeast 67 (46); Henry Brookes 3/31 (3 overs) |

Glamorgan won by 3 wickets
Lord's, London
Umpires: Ian Blackwell and Nigel Llong

- Middlesex won the toss and elected to bat.

7 June 2024 (D/N)
Scorecard

| Glamorgan; 166/8 (20 overs) | v | Essex Eagles; 168/8 (18.4 overs) |
| Colin Ingram 52 (29); Daniel Sams 3/28 (4 overs) | | Adam Rossington 48 (24); Mason Crane 4/25 (4 overs) |

Essex Eagles won by 2 wickets
County Ground, Chelmsford
Umpires: Mark Newell and Paul Pollard

- Essex Eagles won the toss and elected to field.

7 June 2024 (D/N)
Scorecard

| Gloucestershire; 124 (18.2 overs) | v | Hampshire Hawks; 128/5 (16.5 overs) |
| Cameron Bancroft 29 (23); John Turner 3/24 (3.2 overs) | | Toby Albert 41* (32); David Payne 3/17 (4 overs) |

Hampshire Hawks won by 5 wickets
County Ground, Bristol
Umpires: Mike Burns and Nigel Llong

- Hampshire Hawks won the toss and elected to field.

7 June 2024 (D/N)
Scorecard

| Somerset; 197/6 (20 overs) | v | Kent Spitfires; 198/6 (19.2 overs) |
| Will Smeed 68 (30); Matt Parkinson 2/36 (4 overs) | | Sam Billings 106 (58); Jake Ball 2/14 (3 overs) |

Kent Spitfires won by 4 wickets
St Lawrence Ground, Canterbury
Umpires: Ian Blackwell and Ben Debenham

- Kent Spitfires won the toss and elected to field.

7 June 2024 (D/N)
Scorecard

| Sussex Sharks; 213/7 (20 overs) | v | Surrey; 177/7 (20 overs) |
| Tom Alsop 68 (35); Tom Curran 3/32 (4 overs) | | Ollie Pope 99* (59); Nathan McAndrew 3/32 (4 overs) |

Sussex Sharks won by 36 runs
The Oval, London
Umpires: Neil Bainton and David Millns

- Surrey won the toss and elected to field.

9 June 2024
Scorecard

| Sussex Sharks; 208/6 (20 overs) | v | Gloucestershire; 160/8 (20 overs) |
| Daniel Hughes 65 (35); Josh Shaw 3/27 (4 overs) | | Cameron Bancroft 42 (32); Tymal Mills 2/24 (4 overs) |

Sussex Sharks won by 48 runs
County Ground, Bristol
Umpires: Sue Redfern and Russell Warren

- Gloucestershire won the toss and elected to field.

9 June 2024
Scorecard

| Kent Spitfires; 173/8 (20 overs) | v | Middlesex; 178/6 (19.2 overs) |
| Daniel Bell-Drummond 60 (38); Luke Hollman 2/18 (4 overs) | | Ryan Higgins 44 (29); Xavier Bartlett 3/34 (4 overs) |

Middlesex won by 4 wickets
St Lawrence Ground, Canterbury
Umpires: Neil Bainton and Mark Newell

- Middlesex won the toss and elected to field.

9 June 2024
Scorecard

| Somerset; 241/5 (20 overs) | v | Hampshire Hawks; 178 (19.3 overs) |
| Tom Abell 96* (47); Michael Neser 2/30 (3 overs) | | Ben McDermott 46 (29); Ben Green 5/29 (3.3 overs) |

Somerset won by 63 runs
County Ground, Taunton
Umpires: Mike Burns and Nigel Llong

- Hampshire Hawks won the toss and elected to field.

11 June 2024 (D/N)
Scorecard

| Middlesex; 78 (16.3 overs) | v | Somerset; 82/1 (12.3 overs) |
| Noah Cornwell 15* (14); Riley Meredith 4/12 (4 overs) | | Tom Banton 49* (42); Tom Helm 1/20 (4 overs) |

Somerset win by 9 wickets
Lord's, London
Umpires: Rob Bailey and Rob White
Player of the match: Riley Meredith (Somerset)

- Somerset won the toss and elected to field.

13 June 2024 (D/N)
Scorecard

| Glamorgan | v | Hampshire Hawks |

Match abandoned
Sophia Gardens, Cardiff

- No toss.
- No play was possible due to rain.

13 June 2024 (D/N)
Scorecard

| Essex Eagles; 129/4 (12.4 overs) | v | Middlesex; 63/2 (6 overs) |
| Jordan Cox 31* (19); Noah Cornwell 2/29 (2.4 overs) | | Max Holden 41* (24); Paul Walter 2/16 (2 overs) |

Essex Eagles won by 16 runs (DLS method)
Lord's, London
Umpires: Ben Debenham and Chris Watts

- Middlesex won the toss and elected to field.
- Essex Eagles innings was reduced to 12.4 overs due to rain.
- Middlesex were set a revised target of 143 runs off 12 overs and later 80 runs off 6 overs due to rain.

14 June 2024 (D/N)
Scorecard

| Essex Eagles; 178/9 (20 overs) | v | Sussex Sharks; 181/2 (15.4 overs) |
| Dean Elgar 54 (39); Nathan McAndrew 3/33 (4 overs) | | Harrison Ward 68 (36); Matt Critchley 1/29 (2 overs) |

Sussex Sharks won by 8 wickets
County Ground, Chelmsford
Umpires: David Millns and Chris Watts

- Sussex Sharks won the toss and elected to field.

14 June 2024 (D/N)
Scorecard

| Middlesex; 113/8 (16.5 overs) | v | Hampshire Hawks |
| Ryan Higgins 27 (26); James Fuller 2/11 (2.5 overs) |

No result
Rose Bowl, Southampton
Umpires: Nigel Llong and Surendiran Shanmugam

- Hampshire Hawks won the toss and elected to field.
- The match was reduced to 18 overs per side due to rain.
- No further play was possible due to rain.

14 June 2024 (D/N)
Scorecard

| Somerset; 55/6 (5 overs) | v | Kent Spitfires; 46/5 (5 overs) |
| Tom Kohler-Cadmore 24 (9); Nathan Gilchrist 2/12 (1 over) | | Sam Billings 16 (10); Ben Green 1/11 (1 over) |

Somerset won by 14 runs (DLS method)
County Ground, Taunton
Umpires: Ian Blackwell and Mark Newell

- Kent Spitfires won the toss and elected to field.
- The match was reduced to 5 overs per side due to rain.
- Kent Spitfires were set a revised target of 61 runs from 5 overs.
- Nathan Gilchrist and Charlie Stobo (Kent Spitfires) both made their T20 debut.

14 June 2024 (D/N)
Scorecard

| Gloucestershire; 170/6 (20 overs) | v | Surrey; 170/9 (20 overs) |
| Beau Webster 40 (31); Jordan Clark 1/20 (2 overs) | | Jason Roy 55 (40); Matthew Taylor 3/27 (4 overs) |

Match tied
The Oval, London
Umpires: Mike Burns and Ben Debenham

- Surrey won the toss and elected to field.

15 June 2024 (D/N)
Scorecard

| Surrey; 184/8 (20 overs) | v | Sussex Sharks; 130 (18.1 overs) |
| Jamie Smith 45 (22); Danny Lamb 3/36 (4 overs) | | John Simpson 25 (21); Tom Curran 3/39 (4 overs) |

Surrey won by 54 runs
County Ground, Hove
Umpires: Nigel Llong and Surendiran Shanmugam

- Sussex Sharks won the toss and elected to field.

16 June 2024
Scorecard

| Kent Spitfires; 125 (19.5 overs) | v | Gloucestershire; 127/1 (11.4 overs) |
| Sam Billings 36 (26); Matthew Taylor 3/30 (4 overs) | | Miles Hammond 80 (41); Nathan Gilchrist 1/42 (3 overs) |

Gloucestershire won by 9 wickets
St Lawrence Ground, Canterbury
Umpires: David Millns and Surendiran Shanmugam

- Gloucestershire won the toss and elected to field.

16 June 2024
Scorecard

| Somerset; 193/8 (20 overs) | v | Glamorgan; 85 (13.2 overs) |
| Will Smeed 86 (48); Dan Douthwaite 4/37 (4 overs) | | Sam Northeast 24 (15); Lewis Gregory 3/11 (3 overs) |

Somerset won by 108 runs
County Ground, Taunton
Umpires: Mike Burns and Jack Shantry

- Glamorgan won the toss and elected to field.

20 June 2024 (D/N)
Scorecard

| Hampshire Hawks; 166/7 (20 overs) | v | Essex Eagles; 170/2 (16.5 overs) |
| Joe Weatherley 48 (38); Ben Allison 3/44 (4 overs) | | Dean Elgar 60* (44); Chris Wood 1/33 (4 overs) |

Essex Eagles won by 8 wickets
County Ground, Chelmsford
Umpires: Ian Blackwell and Anthony Harris

- Essex Eagles won the toss and elected to field.
- Charlie Allison (Essex Eagles) and Fletcha Middleton (Hampshire Hawks) both made their T20 debut.

20 June 2024 (D/N)
Scorecard

| Glamorgan; 140/6 (20 overs) | v | Gloucestershire; 142/8 (20 overs) |
| Sam Northeast 46* (42); Matthew Taylor 3/21 (4 overs) | | Jack Taylor 70 (48); Timm van der Gugten 2/8 (4 overs) |

Gloucestershire won by 2 wickets
Sophia Gardens, Cardiff
Umpires: Paul Baldwin and Russell Warren

- Glamorgan won the toss and elected to bat.

20 June 2024 (D/N)
Scorecard

| Surrey; 185/9 (20 overs) | v | Middlesex; 129/8 (20 overs) |
| Tom Curran 48 (28); Luke Hollman 5/16 (4 overs) | | Jack Davies 35 (30); Sean Abbott 5/18 (4 overs) |

Surrey won by 56 runs
Lord's, London
Umpires: Nigel Llong and Martin Saggers

- Middlesex won the toss and elected to field.

20 June 2024 (D/N)
Scorecard

| Sussex Sharks; 201/7 (20 overs) | v | Kent Spitfires; 170/7 (20 overs) |
| Harrison Ward 61 (28); Matt Parkinson 3/31 (4 overs) | | Sam Billings 51 (35); Danny Lamb 3/37 (4 overs) |

Sussex Sharks won by 31 runs
County Ground, Hove
Umpires: Neil Bainton and Chris Watts

- Kent Spitfires won the toss and elected to field.

21 June 2024 (D/N)
Scorecard

| Somerset; 188/4 (20 overs) | v | Gloucestershire; 190/5 (18.4 overs) |
| Tom Banton 79 (53); Josh Shaw 2/38 (4 overs) | | James Bracey 44 (31); Jack Leach 2/36 (4 overs) |

Gloucestershire won by 5 wickets
County Ground, Bristol
Umpires: Paul Baldwin and Ben Peverall

- Gloucestershire won the toss and elected to field.

21 June 2024 (D/N)
Scorecard

| Sussex Sharks; 184/8 (20 overs) | v | Hampshire Hawks; 177/3 (20 overs) |
| Tom Alsop 43 (27); Michael Neser 3/32 (4 overs) | | Joe Weatherley 68 (47); Nathan McAndrew 1/21 (4 overs) |

Sussex Sharks won by 7 runs
Rose Bowl, Southampton
Umpires: Mike Burns and Ben Debenham
Player of the match: Nathan McAndrew (Sussex Sharks)

- Hampshire Hawks won the toss and elected to field.

21 June 2024 (D/N)
Scorecard

| Kent Spitfires; 156/7 (20 overs) | v | Essex Eagles; 157/5 (15 overs) |
| Sam Billings 38 (20); Matt Critchley 2/28 (4 overs) | | Michael Pepper 76 (42); Nathan Gilchrist 3/46 (3 overs) |

Essex Eagles won by 5 wickets
St Lawrence Ground, Canterbury
Umpires: Martin Saggers and James Tredwell

- Essex Eagles won the toss and elected to field.

21 June 2024 (D/N)
Scorecard

| Glamorgan; 107/9 (20 overs) | v | Surrey; 108/1 (9 overs) |
| Marnus Labuschagne 20 (24); Gus Atkinson 3/19 (4 overs) | | Dom Sibley 44* (26); Chris Sole 1/22 (2 overs) |

Surrey won by 9 wickets
The Oval, London
Umpires: Ian Blackwell and Mark Newell

- Glamorgan won the toss and elected to bat.

5 July 2024
Scorecard

| Kent Spitfires; 150 (19.2 overs) | v | Gloucestershire; 29/2 (5 overs) |
| Daniel Bell-Drummond 76 (52); David Payne 4/25 (4 overs) | | Miles Hammond 21* (20); Nathan Gilchrist 2/1 (1 over) |

Kent Spitfires won by 8 runs (DLS method)
College Ground, Cheltenham
Umpires: Ben Peverall and Alex Wharf

- Gloucestershire won the toss and elected to field.
- Rain prevented any further play.
- Gloucestershire were below the DLS par score of 37 in 5 overs.

5 July 2024 (D/N)
Scorecard

| Essex Eagles | v | Somerset |

Match abandoned
County Ground, Chelmsford
Umpires: Ben Debenham and Jack Shantry

- No toss.
- No play was possible due to rain.

5 July 2024 (D/N)
Scorecard

| Surrey | v | Middlesex |

Match abandoned
The Oval, London
Umpires: Tom Lungley and Martin Saggers

- No toss.
- No play was possible due to rain.

5 July 2024 (D/N)
Scorecard

| Glamorgan; 235/6 (20 overs) | v | Sussex Sharks; 190/8 (18 overs) |
| Kiran Carlson 87 (47); Tymal Mills 4/29 (4 overs) | | Daniel Hughes 74 (38); Dan Douthwaite 2/31 (3 overs) |

Glamorgan won by 24 runs (DLS method)
County Ground, Hove
Umpires: Mark Newell and James Tredwell

- Sussex Sharks won the toss and elected to field.
- Sussex Sharks were set a revised target of 215 runs off 18 overs due to rain.

6 July 2024
Scorecard

| Middlesex | v | Hampshire Hawks |

Match abandoned
Radlett Cricket Club, Radlett

- No toss.
- No play was possible due to rain.

7 July 2024
Scorecard

| Glamorgan; 182/8 (20 overs) | v | Essex Eagles; 156 (18.5 overs) |
| Colin Ingram 47 (28); Ben Allison 3/52 (4 overs) | | Paul Walter 53 (33); Timm van der Gugten 3/20 (4 overs) |

Glamorgan won by 26 runs
Sophia Gardens, Cardiff
Umpires: Ben Peverall and Rob White

- Essex Eagles won the toss and elected to field.

7 July 2024
Scorecard

| Somerset; 194/6 (20 overs) | v | Gloucestershire; 196/5 (19.5 overs) |
| Tom Banton 77* (46); Marchant de Lange 2/25 (4 overs) | | Miles Hammond 42 (32); Lewis Gregory 3/34 (4 overs) |

Gloucestershire won by 5 wickets
County Ground, Taunton
Umpires: Mark Newell and Alex Wharf
Player of the match: Beau Webster (Gloucestershire)

- Gloucestershire won the toss and elected to field.

7 July 2024
Scorecard

| Surrey; 103/5 (10 overs) | v | Kent Spitfires; 81/3 (8 overs) |
| Laurie Evans 25 (13); Grant Stewart 2/24 (2 overs) | | Feroze Khushi 35 (19); Reece Topley 2/27 (2 overs) |

Surrey won by 5 runs (DLS method)
The Oval, London
Umpires: Neil Pratt and Martin Saggers

- Kent Spitfires won the toss and elected to field.
- The match was reduced to 10 overs per side due to rain.
- Kent Spitfires were set a revised target of 87 runs from 8 overs due to rain.
- Ollie Sykes (Surrey) made his T20 debut.

10 July 2024 (D/N)
Scorecard

| Sussex Sharks; 200/7 (20 overs) | v | Hampshire Hawks; 178 (19.1 overs) |
| James Coles 46 (33); James Fuller 2/20 (3 overs) | | Joe Weatherley 34 (23); James Coles 4/34 (4 overs) |

Sussex Sharks won by 22 runs
County Ground, Hove
Umpires: Ben Debenham and Jack Shantry

- Hampshire Hawks won the toss and elected to field.

11 July 2024 (D/N)
Scorecard

| Essex Eagles; 187/3 (20 overs) | v | Kent Spitfires; 165/5 (20 overs) |
| Paul Walter 46* (27); Matt Parkinson 2/29 (4 overs) | | Tawanda Muyeye 73 (49); Shane Snater 2/25 (3 overs) |

Essex Eagles won by 22 runs
County Ground, Chelmsford
Umpires: Neil Bainton and Chris Watts

- Kent Spitfires won the toss and elected to field.

11 July 2024 (D/N)
Scorecard

| Middlesex; 181/8 (20 overs) | v | Gloucestershire; 152 (19.5 overs) |
| Martin Andersson 52 (39); David Payne 3/28 (4 overs) | | Jack Taylor 45 (24); Luke Hollman 3/37 (4 overs) |

Middlesex won by 29 runs
College Ground, Cheltenham
Umpires: Ian Blackwell and Richard Illingworth

- Gloucestershire won the toss and elected to field.

12 July 2024 (D/N)
Scorecard

| Glamorgan; 88/9 (10 overs) | v | Middlesex; 89/4 (9.3 overs) |
| Mason Crane 18* (9); Luke Hollman 4/13 (2 overs) | | Martin Andersson 30 (23); Dan Douthwaite 1/13 (2 overs) |

Middlesex won by 6 wickets
Sophia Gardens, Cardiff
Umpires: Richard Illingworth and Ben Peverall

- Middlesex won the toss and elected to field.
- The match was reduced to 10 overs per side due to rain.

12 July 2024 (D/N)
Scorecard

| Gloucestershire; 176/9 (20 overs) | v | Hampshire Hawks; 177/5 (20 overs) |
| Miles Hammond 66 (47); Brad Wheal 4/35 (4 overs) | | Benny Howell 62* (27); Tom Smith 3/35 (4 overs) |

Hampshire Hawks won by 5 wickets
Rose Bowl, Southampton
Umpires: Hassan Adnan and Chris Watts

- Gloucestershire won the toss and elected to bat.

12 July 2024 (D/N)
Scorecard

| Sussex Sharks; 203/4 (20 overs) | v | Kent Spitfires; 115 (16.2 overs) |
| Tom Alsop 87* (41); Jas Singh 2/37 (4 overs) | | Tawanda Muyeye 45 (26); James Coles 4/12 (4 overs) |

Sussex Sharks won by 88 runs
St Lawrence Ground, Canterbury
Umpires: Neil Bainton and Jack Shantry

- Kent Spitfires won the toss and elected to field.

12 July 2024 (D/N)
Scorecard

| Surrey; 182/5 (20 overs) | v | Somerset; 183/4 (19 overs) |
| Rory Burns 62 (44); Jack Leach 1/4 (1 over) | | Tom Kohler-Cadmore 51 (32); Will Jacks 1/19 (2 overs) |

Somerset won by 6 wickets
County Ground, Taunton
Umpires: Ian Blackwell and Anthony Harris

- Surrey won the toss and elected to bat.
- George Thomas (Somerset) made his T20 debut.

13 July 2024
Scorecard

| Sussex Sharks; 207/2 (20 overs) | v | Essex Eagles; 211/5 (18.3 overs) |
| Daniel Hughes 81 (43); Matt Critchley 1/20 (2 overs) | | Michael Pepper 120* (53); Ollie Robinson 3/27 (4 overs) |

Essex Eagles won by 5 wickets
County Ground, Hove
Umpires: Hassan Adnan and Jack Shantry

- Essex Eagles won the toss and elected to field.

14 July 2024
Scorecard

| Surrey; 189/9 (20 overs) | v | Essex Eagles; 176/8 (20 overs) |
| Will Jacks 86 (46); Simon Harmer 3/44 (4 overs) | | Adam Rossington 78 (49); Chris Jordan 3/34 (4 overs) |

Surrey won by 13 runs
County Ground, Chelmsford
Umpires: Hassan Adnan and Rob Bailey

- Essex Eagles won the toss and elected to field.

14 July 2024
Scorecard

| Gloucestershire; 206/6 (20 overs) | v | Glamorgan; 85 (15.5 overs) |
| Jack Taylor 80* (35); Andy Gorvin 3/26 (4 overs) | | Colin Ingram 20 (12); David Payne 3/7 (3 overs) |

Gloucestershire won by 121 runs
College Ground, Cheltenham
Umpires: Surendiran Shanmugam and Alex Wharf

- Glamorgan won the toss and elected to field.

14 July 2024
Scorecard

| Hampshire Hawks; 157/7 (20 overs) | v | Somerset; 158/1 (18 overs) |
| Tom Prest 51 (32); Migael Pretorius 2/22 (3 overs) | | Tom Banton 79* (52); Benny Howell 1/16 (3 overs) |

Somerset won by 9 wickets
Rose Bowl, Southampton
Umpires: Ben Debenham and Jack Shantry

- Hampshire Hawks won the toss and elected to bat.
- Eddie Jack (Hampshire Hawks) made his T20 debut

16 July 2024 (D/N)
Scorecard

| Glamorgan; 145/6 (13 overs) | v | Kent Spitfires; 132/5 (13 overs) |
| Marnus Labuschagne 50* (26); Nathan Gilchrist 2/21 (3 overs) | | Sam Billings 33 (17); Timm van der Gugten 2/26 (3 overs) |

Glamorgan won by 13 runs
St Lawrence Ground, Canterbury
Umpires: Rob Bailey and Ben Debenham
Player of the match: Marnus Labuschagne (Glamorgan)

- Kent Spitfires won the toss and elected to field.
- The match was reduced to 13 overs per side due to rain.

18 July 2024 (D/N)
Scorecard

| Gloucestershire; 179/8 (20 overs) | v | Middlesex; 169/7 (20 overs) |
| Cameron Bancroft 87 (54); Ryan Higgins 2/25 (4 overs) | | Leus du Plooy 73* (52); Matthew Taylor 2/17 (4 overs) |

Gloucestershire won by 10 runs
County Ground, Chelmsford
Umpires: Neil Bainton and Jack Shantry

- Gloucestershire won the toss and elected to bat.

18 July 2024 (D/N)
Scorecard

| Sussex Sharks; 158/9 (20 overs) | v | Somerset; 162/4 (17.4 overs) |
| Harrison Ward 39 (23); Ben Green 4/17 (3 overs) | | Tom Abell 47* (34); Tymal Mills 2/28 (4 overs) |

Somerset won by 6 wickets
County Ground, Taunton
Umpires: Mike Burns and Surendiran Shanmugam

- Somerset won the toss and elected to field.

18 July 2024 (D/N)
Scorecard

| Hampshire Hawks; 183 (19.5 overs) | v | Surrey; 188/5 (19.1 overs) |
| Toby Albert 66 (45); Jordan Clark 3/24 (3 overs) | | Sam Curran 102* (58); John Turner 2/30 (4 overs) |

Surrey won by 5 wickets
The Oval, London
Umpires: Nigel Llong and Rob White

- Surrey won the toss and elected to field.
- Sam Curran (Surrey) scored his first century in T20s.

19 July 2024 (D/N)
Scorecard

| Glamorgan; 243/4 (20 overs) | v | Somerset; 123 (13.3 overs) |
| Kiran Carlson 135 (64); Ben Green 2/48 (3 overs) | | Tom Abell 29 (20); Marnus Labuschagne 5/11 (2.3 overs) |

Glamorgan won by 120 runs
Sophia Gardens, Cardiff
Umpires: Paul Baldwin and Surendiran Shanmugam

- Glamorgan won the toss and elected to bat.

19 July 2024 (D/N)
Scorecard

| Hampshire Hawks; 181/5 (20 overs) | v | Essex Eagles; 174/7 (20 overs) |
| Ben McDermott 64 (48); Shane Snater 2/22 (4 overs) | | Charlie Allison 69* (49); John Turner 4/23 (4 overs) |

Hampshire Hawks won by 7 runs
Rose Bowl, Southampton
Umpires: Mike Burns and Rob White

- Essex Eagles won the toss and elected to field.

19 July 2024 (D/N)
Scorecard

| Kent Spitfires; 217/5 (20 overs) | v | Surrey; 131 (16 overs) |
| Tawanda Muyeye 61 (31); Matt Dunn 2/40 (4 overs) | | Sam Curran 24 (19); Matt Parkinson 3/23 (4 overs) |

Kent Spitfires won by 86 runs
St Lawrence Ground, Canterbury
Umpires: Nigel Llong and Chris Watts

- Surrey won the toss and elected to field.

19 July 2024 (D/N)
Scorecard

| Middlesex; 159/9 (20 overs) | v | Sussex Sharks; 161/1 (16.2 overs) |
| Jack Davies 52 (35); Ollie Robinson 3/27 (4 overs) | | Daniel Hughes 96* (54); Blake Cullen 1/31 (3 overs) |

Sussex Sharks won by 9 wickets
County Ground, Hove
Umpires: Ben Debenham and Jack Shantry

- Middlesex won the toss and elected to bat.

== Knock-out stage ==
=== Bracket ===
Quarter-finals
S1 | Surrey | 164/5 (18 overs)
N4 | Durham | 162/8 (20 overs)
N2 | Northants Steelbacks | 198/5 (20 overs)
S3 | Somerset | 215/3 (20 overs)
N1 | Birmingham Bears | 124/9 (20 overs)
S4 | Gloucestershire | 138 (19.2 overs)
S2 | Sussex Sharks | 118/2 (14.1 overs)
N3 | Lancashire Lightning | 114 (15.3 overs)

Semi-finals
QF1 | Surrey | 153/9 (20 overs)
QF3 | Somerset | 159/4 (18.4 overs)
QF4 | Gloucestershire | 109/2 (13.4 overs)
QF2 | Sussex Sharks | 106 (18.1 overs)

Final
SF1 | Somerset | 124 (19.4 overs)
SF2 | Gloucestershire | 129/2 (15 overs)

=== Quarter-finals ===
Quarter-final 1
3 September 2024
18:00 (D/N)
Scorecard

| Durham; 162/8 (20 overs) | v | Surrey; 164/5 (18 overs) |
| Michael Jones 37* (24); Daniel Worrall 2/14 (4 overs) | | Dom Sibley 67 (48); Brydon Carse 2/34 (4 overs) |

Surrey won by 5 wickets
The Oval, London
Umpires: James Middlebrook and Martin Saggers
Player of the match: Dom Sibley (Surrey)

- Surrey won the toss and elected to field.

Quarter-final 2
4 September 2024
19:00 (D/N)
Scorecard

| Lancashire Lightning; 114 (15.3 overs) | v | Sussex Sharks; 118/2 (14.1 overs) |
| Liam Livingstone 43 (35); James Coles 2/9 (2 overs) | | Daniel Hughes 35 (22); Liam Livingstone 1/17 (3 overs) |

Sussex Sharks won by 8 wickets
County Ground, Hove
Umpires: Mike Burns and Ben Debenham
Player of the match: James Coles (Sussex Sharks)

- Sussex Sharks won the toss and elected to field.

Quarter-final 3
5 September 2024
18:30 (D/N)
Scorecard

| Somerset; 215/3 (20 overs) | v | Northants Steelbacks; 198/5 (20 overs) |
| Tom Banton 75 (43); Ben Sanderson 1/23 (4 overs) | | David Willey 57 (39); Lewis Gregory 3/35 (4 overs) |

Somerset won by 17 runs
County Ground, Northampton
Umpires: Paul Pollard and Russell Warren
Player of the match: Tom Banton (Somerset)

- Northants Steelbacks won the toss and elected to field.

Quarter-final 4
6 September 2024
19:00 (D/N)
Scorecard

| Gloucestershire; 138 (19.2 overs) | v | Birmingham Bears; 124/9 (20 overs) |
| Cameron Bancroft 43 (35); Zak Foulkes 3/22 (3 overs) | | Chris Benjamin 33 (27); David Payne 4/23 (4 overs) |

Gloucestershire won by 14 runs
Edgbaston, Birmingham
Umpires: Steve O'Shaughnessy and Alex Wharf
Player of the match: Oliver Price (Gloucestershire)

- Birmingham Bears won the toss and elected to field.

== Finals Day ==
=== Semi-finals ===
Semi-final 1
14 September 2024
11:00
Scorecard

| Surrey; 153/9 (20 overs) | v | Somerset; 159/4 (18.4 overs) |
| Dom Sibley 48 (36); Lewis Gregory 3/15 (4 overs) | | Sean Dickson 78 (57); Daniel Worrall 2/15 (4 overs) |

Somerset won by 6 wickets
Edgbaston, Birmingham
Umpires: James Middlebrook and Paul Pollard
Player of the match: Sean Dickson (Somerset)

- Somerset won the toss and elected to field.

Semi-final 2
14 September 2024
14:30
Scorecard

| Sussex Sharks; 106 (18.1 overs) | v | Gloucestershire; 109/2 (13.4 overs) |
| Jack Carson 26 (29); Tom Smith 3/25 (4 overs) | | James Bracey 49* (28); Brad Currie 1/12 (2 overs) |

Gloucestershire won by 8 wickets
Edgbaston, Birmingham
Umpires: Ben Debenham and Paul Pollard
Player of the match: David Payne (Gloucestershire)

- Sussex Sharks won the toss and elected to bat.

=== Final ===
14 September 2024
18:45 (N)
Scorecard

| Somerset; 124 (19.4 overs) | v | Gloucestershire; 129/2 (15 overs) |
| Lewis Gregory 53 (37); Matthew Taylor 3/18 (4 overs) | | Miles Hammond 58* (41); Josh Davey 1/18 (3 overs) |

Gloucestershire won by 8 wickets
Edgbaston, Birmingham
Umpires: Graham Lloyd and Steve O'Shaughnessy
Player of the match: Matthew Taylor (Gloucestershire)

- Gloucestershire won the toss and elected to field.

== Statistics ==
=== Most runs ===
| Player | Runs | Team | Inns | HS |
|---|---|---|---|---|
| 596 | Daniel Hughes | Sussex Sharks | 16 | 96* |
| 569 | Sam Hain | Birmingham Bears | 13 | 98* |
| 535 | Michael Pepper | Essex Eagles | 13 | 120* |
| 534 | Cameron Bancroft | Gloucestershire | 17 | 94 |
| 515 | Tom Banton | Somerset | 14 | 79* |
Source: ESPNcricinfo

=== Most wickets ===
| Wkts | Player | Team | Inn |
|---|---|---|---|
| 33 | David Payne | Gloucestershire | 17 |
| 29 | Danny Briggs | Birmingham Bears | 15 |
| 29 | Matthew Taylor | Gloucestershire | 16 |
| 24 | Tymal Mills | Sussex Sharks | 14 |
| 23 | Luke Hollman | Middlesex | 11 |
Source: ESPNcricinfo

=== Team records ===
==== Highest totals ====
| Teams | Scores | Opponent | Result | Venue |
|---|---|---|---|---|
| Glamorgan | 243/4 (20 overs) | Somerset | Won | Cardiff |
| Somerset | 241/5 (20 overs) | Hampshire Hawks | Won | Taunton |
| Glamorgan | 235/6 (20 overs) | Sussex Sharks | Won | Hove |
| Birmingham Bears | 219/4 (20 overs) | Northamptonshire Steelbacks | Won | Birmingham |
| Durham | 218/3 (20 overs) | Lancashire Lightning | Won | Chester-le-Street |
Source: ESPNcricinfo
