= 2024 English cricket season =

County Championship
- Champions: Surrey
- Runners-up: Hampshire

One-Day Cup
- Champions: Glamorgan
- Runners-up: Somerset

T20 Blast
- Champions: Gloucestershire
- Runners-up: Somerset

Rachael Heyhoe Flint Trophy
- Champions: Sunrisers
- Runners-up: South East Stars

Charlotte Edwards Cup
- Champions: The Blaze
- Runners-up: South East Stars

The Hundred
- Champions: London Spirit (women's); Oval Invincibles (men's)
- Runners-up: Welsh Fire (women's); Southern Brave (men's)

The 2024 English cricket season commenced on 5 April and finished on 29 September 2024.

It was the 124th season in which the County Championship has been an official competition and featured First-Class, List-A, and Twenty20 cricket competitions throughout England and Wales.

For both men and women, the fourth edition of The Hundred was played from 23 July – 18 August 2024.

== International tours ==
=== Pakistan men's tour ===
In May 2024, Pakistan toured England to play four Twenty20 International (T20I) matches as part of their preparation for the 2024 ICC Men's T20 World Cup. England won the series 2–0 with two matches being abandoned.

=== West Indies men's tour ===
In July 2024, West Indies toured England to play three Test matches which formed part of the 2023–2025 ICC World Test Championship. England won all three Tests with Gus Atkinson named player of the series after taking 22 wickets.

=== Sri Lanka men's tour ===
In August and September 2024, Sri Lanka toured England to play three Test matches which formed part of the 2023–2025 ICC World Test Championship. England won the series with victories in the first two Tests before Sri Lanka won the final Test at The Oval.

=== Australia men's tour ===
In September 2024, Australia toured England for three T20I and five One Day International matches. The T20I series was drawn 1–1 with one match abandoned before Australia secured a 3–2 victory in the ODI series.

=== Pakistan women's tour ===
The Pakistan women's team toured England in May to play three Women's One Day International (WODI) and three Women's Twenty20 International (WT20I) matches. England won the WT20I series 3–0 before a 2–0 victory in the WODI series with one match abandoned. The WODI series formed part of the 2022–2025 ICC Women's Championship.

=== New Zealand women's tour ===
The New Zealand women's team toured England in June and July to play three WODI and five WT20I matches. England won the WODI series 3–0 and completed a clean sweep by triumphing 5–0 in the WT20Is.

== Domestic cricket ==
=== County Championship ===
The County Championship began on 5 April and finished on 29 September with each team playing 14 fixtures. Defending champions Surrey retained their title to complete a third consecutive championship win. Lancashire and Kent were relegated from Division One, with Sussex and Yorkshire earning promotion from Division Two.

=== One-Day Cup ===
The One-Day Cup ran from 24 July to 23 September with the counties separated into two groups of nine. Glamorgan defeated Somerset in the final, winning by 15 runs.

=== T20 Blast ===
The T20 Blast ran from 30 May until 14 September with the eighteen counties divided into two groups of nine - the North Group and the South Group. All four teams to reach finals day came from the South Group with Gloucestershire beating Somerset by eight wickets in the final.

=== The Hundred ===
The fourth season of The Hundred took place in July and August, with eight men's and eight women's teams competing. The Oval Invincibles defended the men's title with London Spirit securing a first title in the women's competition.

=== Rachael Heyhoe Flint Trophy ===
The Rachael Heyhoe Flint Trophy took place from 20 April to 21 September, with eight regional teams competing in a round-robin group. The final took place on 21 September at Grace Road, Leicester. The Sunrisers won their first title, beating South East Stars.

=== Charlotte Edwards Cup ===
The Charlotte Edwards Cup took place from 18 May to 22 June, with eight regional teams competing in a round-robin group. The Blaze beat South East Stars in the final by seven wickets.

=== Women's County Cricket ===
The Women's Twenty20 Cup took place from 26 May to 26 August, with four regional groups leading to national finals with Derbyshire winning the competition.

=== National Counties Cricket ===
The National Counties Cricket Championship title was shared between Berkshire and Staffordshire after the final ended in a draw. The NCCA Knockout Trophy was won by Norfolk who beat Cheshire in the final.
