= Ben Cliff =

English cricketer (born 2002)

Personal information
- Full name: Benjamin Michael Clifff
- Born: 23 October 2002 (age 24); Halifax, Yorkshire, England
- Batting: Right-handed
- Bowling: Right arm medium

Domestic team information
- Years: Team
- 2023–present: Yorkshire (squad no. 26)
- FC debut: 10 September 2023 Yorkshire v Glamorgan
- LA debut: 2 August 2022 Yorkshire v Northamptonshire

Career statistics
Competition	FC	LA	T20
Matches	12	21	5
Runs scored	99	50	2
Batting average	6.18	10.00	–
100s/50s	0/0	0/0	0
Top score	22	12*	2*
Balls bowled	1,090	908	96
Wickets	22	37	8
Bowling average	28.90	23.56	18.62
5 wickets in innings	1	1	0
10 wickets in match	1	0	0
Best bowling	8/76	5/46	4/31
Catches/stumpings	4/–	7/–	0/–
- Source: Cricinfo, 26 September 2026

Benjamin Michael Cliff (born 23 October 2002) is an English cricketer who plays for Yorkshire Cricket Club. He is a right handed batsman and right arm medium pace bowler.

== Early life ==
From Halifax, West Yorkshire, Cliff played as a youngster at Copley Cricket Club in the Halifax League.

== Career ==
He signed a rookie contract with Yorkshire in July 2022. He began to be included in first-team squads which Yorkshire Director of Cricket Darren Gough described as “recognition for his performances” in second-XI cricket for Yorkshire. He made his List A debut for Yorkshire on 2 August 2022 against Northamptonshire, in 2022 One-Day Cup.

During the 2023 season, he remained part of the Yorkshire red ball first team and in July 2023, was given a two-year professional contract with the county. He made his first-class debut for Yorkshire against Glamorgan on 10 September 2023 in 2023 County Championship.

Playing in the 2nd XI T20 final in July 2024, he took an unusual caught and bowled when Somerset batter Ned Leonard struck the ball against the batter at the non-strikers end which deflected it back to Cliff.

He made his Twenty20 debut for Yorkshire earlier in the 2024 season in 2024 T20 Blast, Cliff took career-best figures of 4/31 against Nottinghamshire at Headingley on 19 July 2024.

== International career ==
Cliff played for England U19 on their tour of Sri Lanka in December 2021, where he took four wickets at an average of 23.25. In January 2022, he was added to 2022 Under-19 Men's Cricket World Cup squad in the place of Sonny Baker, who was ruled out of England's squad due to a back injury. He also featured for the team in the 2022 summer season.
