= Jack Taylor (cricketer) =

English cricketer

Personal information
- Full name: Jack Martin Robert Taylor
- Born: 12 November 1991 (age 35); Banbury, Oxfordshire, England
- Batting: Right-handed
- Bowling: Right-arm leg spin
- Role: All-rounder
- Relatives: Matthew Taylor (brother)

Domestic team information
- Years: Team
- 2010–present: Gloucestershire (squad no. 10)
- FC debut: 31 August 2010 Gloucestershire v Derbyshire
- LA debut: 8 May 2011 Gloucestershire v Somerset

Career statistics
Competition	FC	LA	T20
Matches	96	100	170
Runs scored	3,959	2,742	2,567
Batting average	28.27	39.73	23.12
100s/50s	7/13	3/21	0/7
Top score	156	139*	80*
Balls bowled	5,942	1,864	900
Wickets	78	57	37
Bowling average	45.48	30.33	33.21
5 wickets in innings	0	1	0
10 wickets in match	0	0	0
Best bowling	4/16	5/61	4/16
Catches/stumpings	49/–	44/–	70/–
- Source: ESPNcricinfo, 11 August 2026

Jack Martin Robert Taylor (born 12 November 1991) is an English cricketer, a right-handed batsman and right-arm leg-break bowler who currently plays for Gloucestershire County Cricket Club. He made his first-class debut for Gloucestershire against Derbyshire in August 2010. Taylor signed a two-year contract with Gloucestershire in February 2009. Taylor's younger brother, Matthew Taylor is also a professional player and has played more than 100 games for Gloucestershire.

== County career ==
Born 12 November 1991 at Banbury in Oxfordshire, Taylor made his debut in September 2010 as an 18-year-old against Derbyshire at Bristol. Taylor made 6 and 3 batting and did not bowl in a 54 run loss for Gloucestershire. In the following game against Surrey, Taylor took his maiden first-class wicket, he clean bowled England international Chris Tremlett for 4 runs as he bowled four overs in the first innings. He was again disappointing with the bat recording scores of 0 and 2 and he bowled just one over in the Surrey second innings. Taylor made his List A debut the following season against Somerset at Taunton. He made 2 with the bat and bowled 3 overs that went for 29 runs in an unremarkable one-day debut. In Gloucestershire T20 fixture against Somerset in April 2011, Taylor starred with the ball in the first innings taking 4 wickets for just 16 runs in his four overs playing alongside Sri Lankan Muttiah Muralitharan. He then top scored with the bat hitting 38 runs in 28 balls in a two wicket victory. On 24 July 2011, Taylor took 3 wickets for 50 runs in one-day loss against Nottinghamshire. His one-day form continued as he also took 3 wickets in August 2011 against Unicorns in a six wicket finish.

== Suspension from county cricket ==
On 28 May 2013, the England and Wales Cricket Board announced that they were suspending Taylor, as well as Hampshire's Glen Querl, because of an illegal bowling action.

Both had been reported twice in the previous 12 months for 'displaying elbow extensions in excess of the permitted 15 degrees'. The ban started immediately and ruled Taylor out of the rest of the 2013 season. Consequently, he only played 2nd XI cricket, and only as a batsman. It is hoped that after surgery on his shoulder and coaching he will return for the 2014 season.

== Career best performances ==
as of 28 August 2025

	Batting				Bowling			
	Score	Fixture	Venue	Season	Score	Fixture	Venue	Season
FC	156	Gloucestershire v Northamptonshire	Cheltenham	2015	4–16	Gloucestershire v Glamorgan	Bristol	2016
LA	139*	Gloucestershire v Warwickshire	Bristol	2024	5–61	Gloucestershire v Essex	Chelmsford	2025
T20	80*	Gloucestershire v Glamorgan	Cheltenham	2024	4–16	Gloucestershire Gladiators v Somerset	Bristol	2011
