= Noah Cornwell =

English cricketer (born 2004)

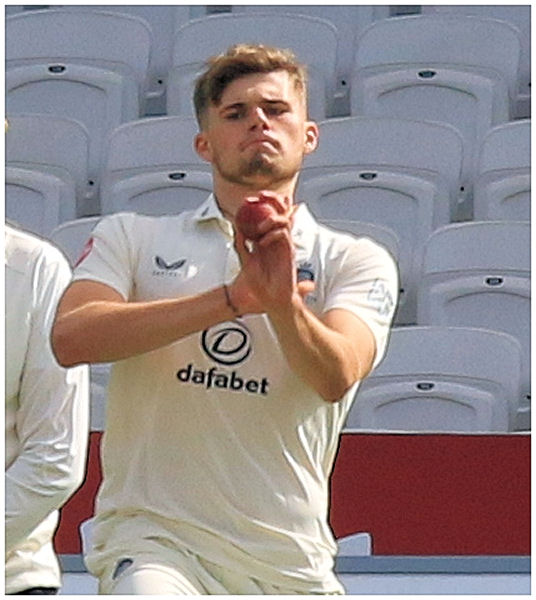
- Cornwell in 2024

Personal information
- Full name: Noah Bo Cornwell
- Born: 10 September 2004 (age 22); Barnet, London, England
- Batting: Left-handed
- Bowling: Left-arm medium

Domestic team information
- Years: Team
- 2024–2026: Middlesex (squad no. 10)
- FC debut: 29 August 2024 Middlesex v Yorkshire
- LA debut: 24 July 2024 Middlesex v Worcestershire

Career statistics
Competition	FC	LA	T20
Matches	7	20	31
Runs scored	2	59	55
Batting average	0.50	19.66	13.75
100s/50s	0/0	0/0	0/0
Top score	2*	28*	15*
Balls bowled	722	863	577
Wickets	16	23	30
Bowling average	34.06	37.78	28.60
5 wickets in innings	0	0	0
10 wickets in match	0	0	0
Best bowling	4/58	3/1	3/34
Catches/stumpings	2/–	6/–	4/–
- Source: Cricinfo, 27 September 2026

Noah Bo Cornwell (born 10 September 2004) is an English cricketer who plays for Middlesex County Cricket Club and has represented England at under-19 level. He is a left arm bowler and left-handed batter.

== Early life ==
Born in Barnet, he featured for Hertfordshire in age-group cricket and played club cricket for Radlett Cricket Club. He joined the Middlesex Elite Player Group (Academy) and signed a rookie contract lasting until 2026.

== Career ==
After featuring for the Middlesex second-XI, he made his Twenty20 debut for Middlesex on 31 May 2024 against Kent, opening the bowling in the 2024 T20 Blast. He made his List A debut in One-Day Cup debut against Worcestershire at New Road on 24 July 2024. He made his first-class debut for Middlesex against Yorkshire on 29 August 2024 in 2024 County Championship.

He was named in the England Lions squad for the 2026 50-overs series against South Africa A.
