= Jafer Chohan =

English cricketer (born 2002)

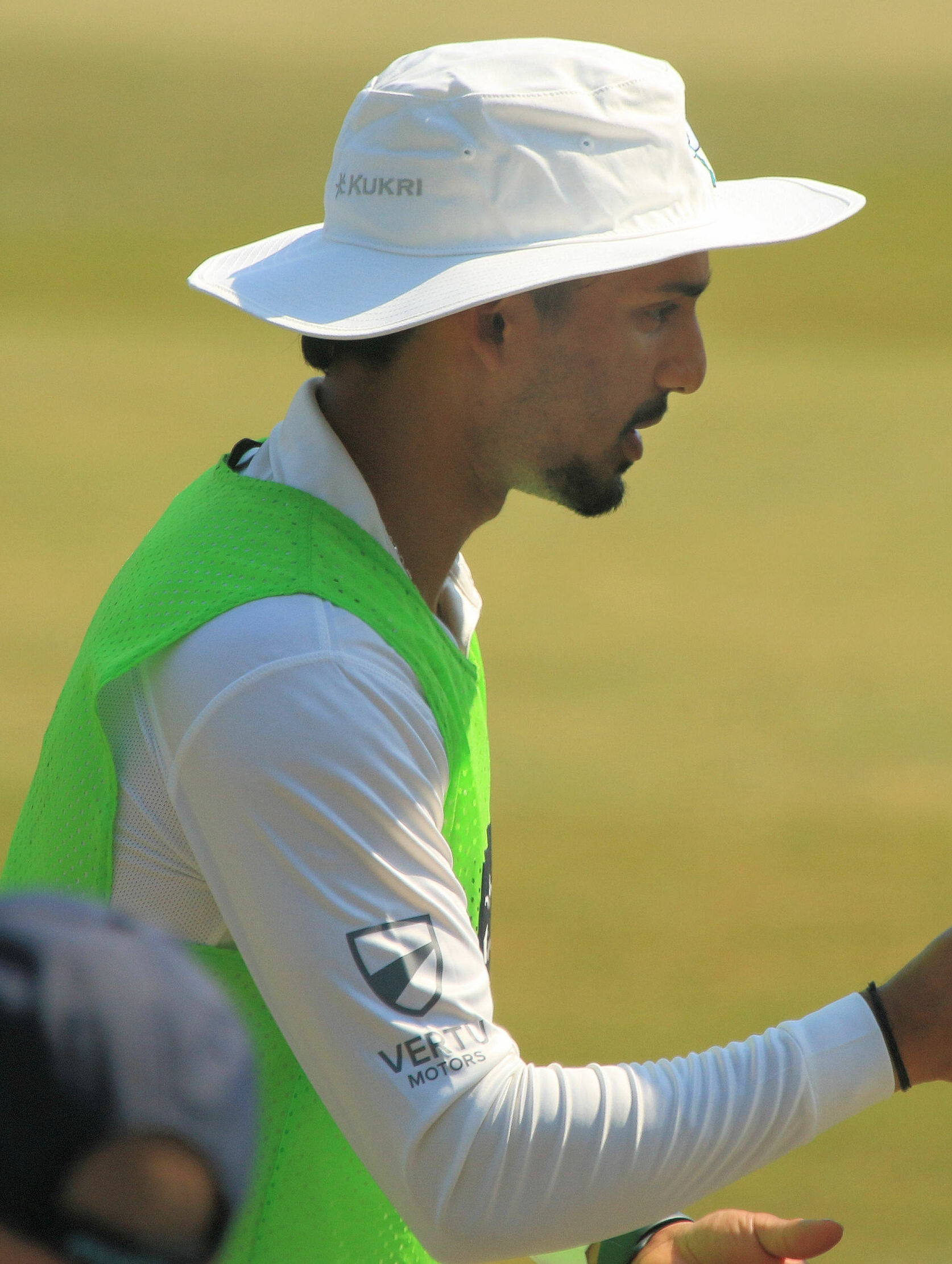
- Chohan in 2023

Personal information
- Full name: Jafer Ali Chohan
- Born: 11 July 2002 (age 24); Camden, London, England
- Batting: Right-handed
- Bowling: Right-arm leg break
- Role: Bowler

Domestic team information
- Years: Team
- 2023–: Yorkshire (squad no. 5)
- 2024/25–2025/26: Sydney Sixers
- 2025: London Spirit
- First-class debut: 20 August 2026 Yorkshire v Hampshire
- List A debut: 22 July 2025; PCC XI v Pakistan Shaheens

Career statistics
Competition	FC	LA	T20
Matches	1	4	59
Runs scored	5	0	126
Batting average	2.50	0.00	9.69
100s/50s	0/0	0/0	0/0
Top score	5	0	37
Balls bowled	96	147	1,089
Wickets	2	7	58
Bowling average	28.50	24.85	26.22
5 wickets in innings	0	0	1
10 wickets in match	0	0	0
Best bowling	1/28	4/43	5/14
Catches/stumpings	0/–	0/–	9/–
- Source: ESPNcricinfo, 12 September 2026

Jafer Ali Chohan (born 11 July 2002) is an English professional cricketer who plays for Yorkshire County Cricket Club. He is a right-handed batsman and a right-arm leg break bowler.

== Early life ==
He was born into a British Pakistani family and developed his leg-spin bowling style by emulating former Pakistan international Shahid Afridi. He was also inspired to bowl leg-spin by seeing Shane Warne play for Rajasthan Royals at Lord's in 2009. He received a cricket scholarship to attend Harrow School. He played in the age groups at Middlesex County Cricket Club from nine years-old to the Academy. In 2021 he started a degree in International Relations at Loughborough University.

== Domestic career ==
He played for Berkshire County Cricket Club as they won the National Counties 50-over competition in 2022. Impressing at Berkshire he was recommended to the South Asian Cricket Academy, where performances against county 2nd XIs and as a net bowler for the England Test squad ahead of their 2022-2023 tour of Pakistan earned Chohan a trial with Yorkshire CCC where he was offered a rookie contract in January 2023. Bowling at the England test team he dismissed both Joe Root and Ben Duckett, with Root recommending him a trial at Yorkshire. Chohan impressed in Cape Town on Yorkshire’s pre-season tour of South Africa in March 2023.

In May 2023, Chohan was named in the Yorkshire side for their opening T20 Blast match of the 2023 season, against Birmingham Bears at Edgbaston Cricket Ground. In July 2023, he was drafted into The Hundred by the Southern Brave. In the same month, it was announced he had signed a new two-year contract with Yorkshire.

In September 2024, he was drafted by the Sydney Sixers for the 2024–25 BBL. Chohan signed a new three-year contract with Yorkshire on 1 October 2024, He made his Big Bash League debut on 15 January 2025 against Adelaide Strikers.

== International career ==
In October 2024, he was named in the England Lions squad for their tour of South Africa and received his first call-up to the senior England squad for their white-ball tour of the West Indies later that month.

== Personal life ==
He is a Muslim and wears a chain necklace during matches, fitted with religious gemstones.
