= George Garrett (cricketer) =

English cricketer (born 2000)

Personal information
- Full name: George Anthony Garrett
- Born: 4 March 2000 (age 26); Harpenden, Hertfordshire, England
- Batting: Left-handed
- Bowling: Right-arm fast-medium
- Role: Bowler

Domestic team information
- Years: Team
- 2019–2023: Warwickshire (squad no. 44)
- 2024–2025: Kent (squad no. 44)
- FC debut: 18 August 2019 Warwickshire v Somerset
- LA debut: 22 July 2021 Warwickshire v Glamorgan

Career statistics
Competition	FC	LA	T20
Matches	17	15	2
Runs scored	230	52	–
Batting average	16.42	10.40	–
100s/50s	0/0	0/0	–
Top score	48	18	–
Balls bowled	2,259	629	24
Wickets	37	16	1
Bowling average	41.08	38.12	39.00
5 wickets in innings	0	0	0
10 wickets in match	0	0	0
Best bowling	3/57	3/50	1/19
Catches/stumpings	6/–	1/–	0/–
- Source: Cricinfo, 28 September 2025

George Anthony Garrett (born 4 March 2000) is an English former professional cricketer. He played as a fast bowler for Kent County Cricket Club and Warwickshire.

Born at Harpenden in Hertfordshire in 2000, Garrett played age-group cricket for Warwickshire from 2014 before making his Second XI debut for the county during the 2018 season. He was educated at Shrewsbury School, where he played for the school XI, and studied history at the University of Birmingham. He played club cricket for Harpenden Cricket Club in the Hertfordshire Cricket League before moving to play for Shrewsbury CC in 2019. Although still a member of Warwickshire's Academy team, he made his First XI debut for the county team during the same season, taking a place in the team after the fast bowling attack had been reduced due to a series of injuries. He took two wickets on his senior debut in August in a County Championship match against Somerset at Edgbaston, before making his Twenty20 debut for the team later in the month.

After playing for the team during 2020, Garrett moved on to a full-time contract with Warwickshire at the beginning of the 2021 season. He made his List A debut in July 2021, but his opportunities in First XI cricket were limited and after six List A and a single first-class appearance during 2022, he made only one senior appearance for the team during the 2023 season and at the end of the season signed a two-year contract to play for Kent.

After two seasons with Kent, during which he played 17 times for the First XI, Garrett announced his retirement from professional cricket in September 2025 in order to train as a lawyer.
