= Matthew Taylor (cricketer, born 1994) =

English cricketer

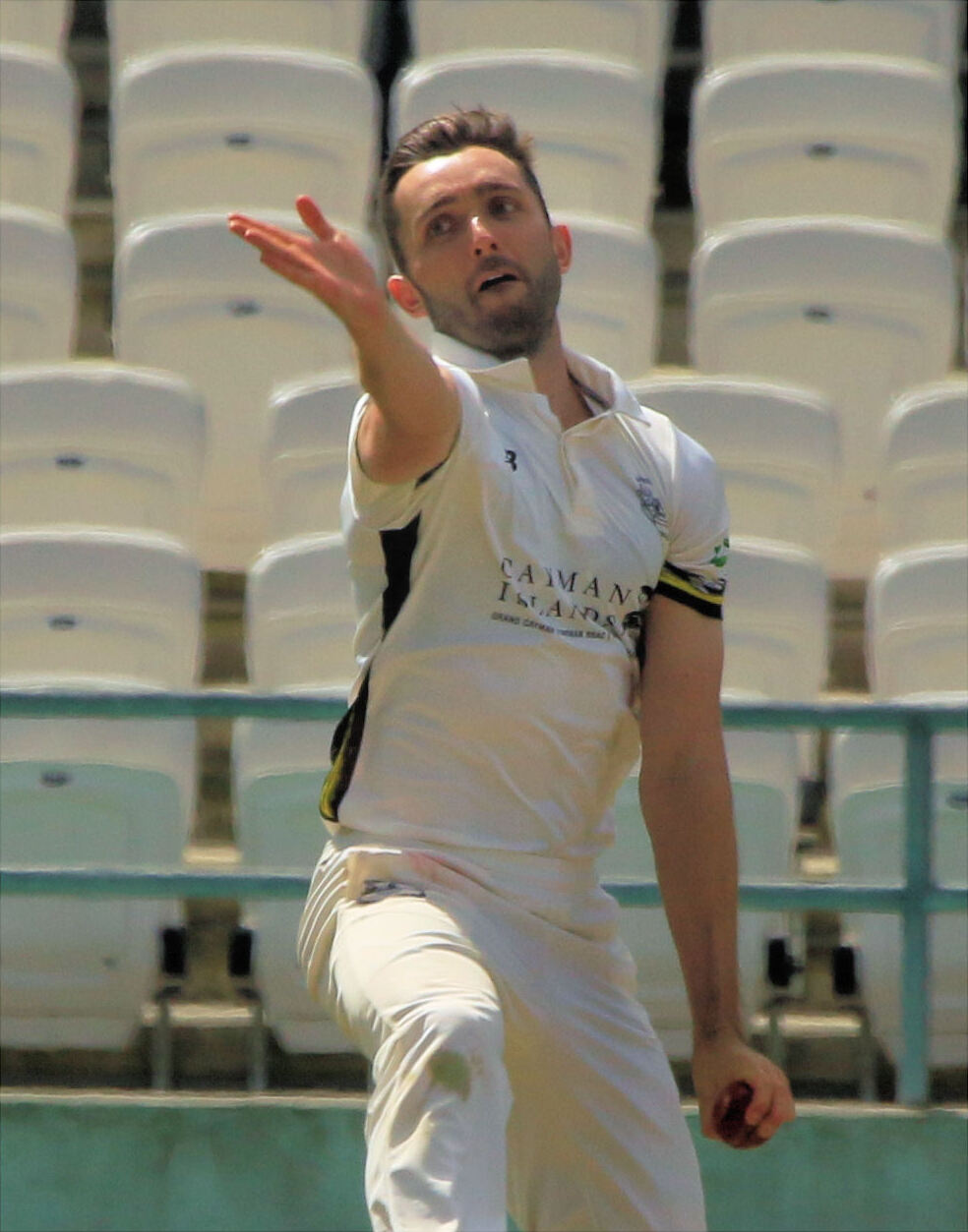
- Taylor in 2023

Personal information
- Full name: Matthew David Taylor
- Born: 8 July 1994 (age 32); Banbury, Oxfordshire, England
- Batting: Right-handed
- Bowling: Left-arm medium-fast
- Role: Bowler
- Relatives: Jack Taylor (brother)

Domestic team information
- Years: Team
- 2011–present: Gloucestershire (squad no. 36)
- FC debut: 3 September 2013 Gloucestershire v Leicestershire
- LA debut: 24 July 2011 Gloucestershire v Nottinghamshire

Career statistics
Competition	FC	LA	T20
Matches	100	49	92
Runs scored	1,421	189	257
Batting average	14.95	21.00	9.17
100s/50s	0/2	0/1	0/0
Top score	57*	51*	27
Balls bowled	15,869	2,276	1,798
Wickets	261	51	95
Bowling average	34.21	38.78	27.29
5 wickets in innings	10	0	0
10 wickets in match	0	0	0
Best bowling	6/43	4/44	4/22
Catches/stumpings	19/–	8/–	23/–
- Source: CricketArchive, 27 September 2026

Matthew David Taylor (born 8 July 1994) is an English cricketer. Taylor is a left-arm fast-medium bowler who bats right-handed. Taylor made his first-class debut for Gloucestershire on 3 September 2013 against Leicestershire.
