= Harrison Ward =

English cricketer (born 1999)

Personal information
- Full name: Harrison David Ward
- Born: 25 October 1999 (age 27); Oxford, Oxfordshire, England
- Batting: Left-handed
- Bowling: Right-arm off break
- Role: Batsman

Domestic team information
- Years: Team
- 2021–2026: Sussex (squad no. 35)
- First-class debut: 11 July 2021 Sussex v Kent
- List A debut: 23 July 2021 Sussex v Lancashire

Career statistics
Competition	FC	LA	T20
Matches	4	12	57
Runs scored	32	215	1,199
Batting average	4.57	17.91	22.62
100s/50s	0/0	0/0	0/7
Top score	19	37	68
Balls bowled	6	66	13
Wickets	0	0	1
Bowling average	–	–	16.00
5 wickets in innings	–	–	0
10 wickets in match	–	–	0
Best bowling	–	–	1/5
Catches/stumpings	2/–	2/–	21/–
- Source: Cricinfo, 18 July 2026

Harrison David Ward (born 25 October 1999) is an English cricketer. He made his Twenty20 debut on 1 July 2021 for Sussex in the 2021 T20 Blast. Prior to his Twenty20 debut, Ward had previously been selected to represent the England under-19 cricket team. He made his first-class debut on 11 July 2021 for Sussex in the 2021 County Championship. He made his List A debut on 23 July 2021 for Sussex in the 2021 Royal London One-Day Cup.
