= Graham Lloyd =

English cricketer (born 1969)

Personal information
- Full name: Graham David Lloyd
- Born: 1 July 1969 (age 57); Accrington, Lancashire
- Batting: Right-handed
- Bowling: Right-arm medium
- Relatives: David Lloyd (father)

Domestic team information
- Years: Team
- 1988-2002: Lancashire
- 2003-2005: Cumberland

Umpiring information
- ODIs umpired: 1 (2025)
- T20Is umpired: 3 (2025)
- WODIs umpired: 6 (2011–2022)
- WT20Is umpired: 7 (2012–2021)
- FC umpired: 150 (2009–2025)
- LA umpired: 60 (2010–2025)
- T20 umpired: 141 (2012–2025)

Career statistics
Competition	ODI	FC	LA
Matches	6	203	296
Runs scored	39	11,279	6,117
Batting average	9.75	38.23	29.12
100s/50s	0/0	24/64	4/29
Top score	22	241	134
Balls bowled	0	339	72
Wickets	–	2	1
Bowling average	–	220.00	103.00
5 wickets in innings	–	0	0
10 wickets in match	–	0	0
Best bowling	–	1/4	1/23
Catches/stumpings	2/–	140/–	67/–
- Source: CricketArchive (subscription required), 31 May 2025

Graham David Lloyd (born 1 July 1969) is a former English cricketer who played for Lancashire County Cricket Club (1988–2002) and in six One Day Internationals for England between 1996 and 1998. His final List A cricket appearance was for Cumberland County Cricket Club in 2003 against Scotland, a match in which he scored 123 runs.

Lloyd played club cricket for Accrington Cricket Club, the town in which he was born. He is the son of former England coach and batsman David Lloyd, under whom he made all of his appearances for England. When Lloyd Senior came out of retirement at the age of 61 to play again for Accrington in 2008 he batted alongside son Graham with father and son making 15 and 78 respectively in a loss against Haslingden Cricket Club.

Lloyd is now an umpire on the first-class umpires list of the England and Wales Cricket Board.

== Personal life ==
Lloyd married Sharon Tandy in 1998. They had 2 sons Joseph and Joshua. Sharon Lloyd died after a five-year battle with a brain tumour in 2011.

== See also ==
- List of One Day International cricket umpires
- List of Twenty20 International cricket umpires
