= College Ground, Cheltenham =

Cricket ground in Gloucestershire, England

Coordinates: 51°53′28″N 2°04′26″W

College Ground
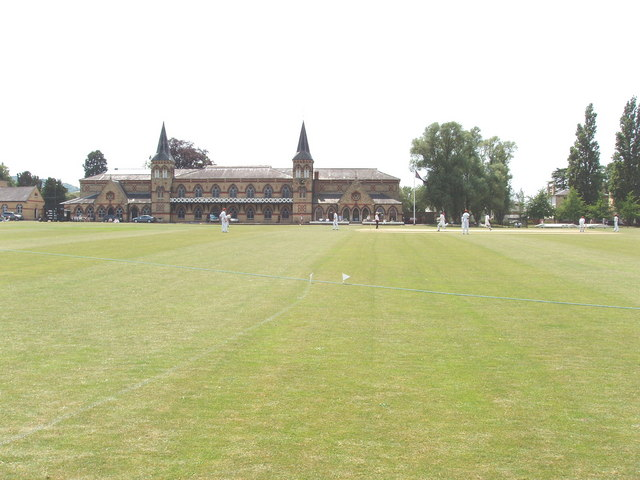
- College Ground, Cheltenham
- Interactive map of College Ground

Ground information
- Location: Cheltenham, Gloucestershire
- Country: England

International information
- Only women's ODI: 15 August 2005: England v Australia
- As of 6 September 2020; Source: CricketArchive

The College Ground is a cricket ground in the grounds of Cheltenham College in Cheltenham, Gloucestershire, England. Gloucestershire County Cricket Club have played more than 300 first-class and more than 70 List A matches there. It also hosted a women's One-Day International between England and Australia in 2005.

The College Ground first hosted first-class cricket in 1872 when Gloucestershire played Surrey; Gloucestershire won the game by an innings and 37 runs thanks largely to W. G. Grace's match haul of 12–63. In August 1876, Grace became the first man to score a triple century in a county match when he hit 318 not out against Yorkshire; he had made the first triple hundred in all first-class cricket for the Gentlemen of Marylebone Cricket Club at Canterbury just one week earlier.

The Cheltenham Cricket Festival, held during the school holidays, has been a part of Gloucestershire's season ever since the 1870s.

== See also ==
- List of cricket grounds in England and Wales
