= 2019 T20 Blast =

Cricket tournament

2019 Vitality Blast
- Dates: 18 July 2019 – 21 September 2019
- Administrator: England and Wales Cricket Board
- Cricket format: Twenty20
- Tournament format(s): Group stage and knockout
- Champions: Essex Eagles (1st title)
- Participants: 18
- Matches: 133
- Attendance: 920,000 (6,917 per match)
- Most runs: Babar Azam (578)
- Most wickets: Ravi Rampaul (23)
- Official website: Vitality Blast

The 2019 Vitality Blast was the seventeenth edition of the T20 Blast currently known as the Vitality Blast, a professional Twenty20 cricket league that was played in England and Wales which was run by the ECB, has been branded as the Vitality Blast due to a new sponsorship deal. The league consisted of the 18 first-class county teams divided into two divisions of nine teams each with fixtures played, slightly later than usual, between July and September. Finals Day took place at Edgbaston Cricket Ground in Birmingham on 21 September 2019. Worcestershire Rapids were the defending champions.

On 7 August 2019, in the match between the Leicestershire Foxes and the Birmingham Bears, Leicestershire's Colin Ackermann took seven wickets for eighteen runs. These were the best bowling figures in a Twenty20 cricket match.

== Points tables ==
=== North Division ===
Pos	Team	Pld	W	L	T	NR	Ded	Pts	NRR
1	Lancashire Lightning	14	8	2	0	4	0	20	0.755
2	Notts Outlaws	14	6	4	0	4	0	16	0.336
3	Derbyshire Falcons	14	7	5	0	2	0	16	0.022
4	Worcestershire Rapids	14	6	5	0	3	0	15	0.205
5	Yorkshire Vikings	14	4	5	1	4	0	13	0.339
6	Durham	14	5	7	0	2	0	12	−0.049
7	Northants Steelbacks	14	4	6	0	4	0	12	−0.543
8	Birmingham Bears	14	4	7	1	2	0	11	−0.467
9	Leicestershire Foxes	14	4	7	0	3	0	11	−0.471

Source: Cricinfo

=== South Division ===
Pos	Team	Pld	W	L	T	NR	Ded	Pts	NRR
1	Sussex Sharks	14	8	3	1	2	0	19	0.803
2	Gloucestershire	14	7	3	1	3	0	18	0.242
3	Middlesex	14	7	6	0	1	0	15	0.216
4	Essex Eagles	14	5	4	1	4	0	15	−0.464
5	Kent Spitfires	14	6	6	0	2	0	14	0.000
6	Somerset	14	6	7	0	1	0	13	0.448
7	Hampshire	14	5	6	1	2	0	13	0.021
8	Surrey	14	5	7	1	1	0	12	−0.246
9	Glamorgan	14	1	8	1	4	0	7	−1.381

Source: Cricinfo

The top four teams from each division will qualify for the knockout stage.

== Results ==
=== League stage ===
All times are in British Summer Time (UTC+01:00)

=== North Group ===
==== July ====
18 July 2019
19:00 (D/N)
Scorecard

Worcestershire Rapids; 161/6 (20 overs)	v	Nottinghamshire Outlaws (H); 133/9 (20 overs)
Ed Barnard 42* (19); Samit Patel 2/26 (4 overs)		Alex Hales 52 (34); Moeen Ali 4/18 (4 overs)

Worcestershire Rapids won by 28 runs
Trent Bridge, Nottingham
Umpires: Mike Burns and Nigel Llong
Player of the match: Ed Barnard (Worcestershire Rapids)

- Worcestershire Rapids won the toss and elected to bat.
- Points: Worcestershire Rapids 2, Nottinghamshire Outlaws 0.

19 July 2019
17:15
Scorecard

Worcestershire Rapids (H)	v	Birmingham Bears

Match abandoned without a ball bowled
New Road, Worcester

- No toss.
- Points: Birmingham Bears 1, Worcestershire Rapids 1.

19 July 2019
18:30 (D/N)
Scorecard

Durham (H); 148/4 (20 overs)	v	Northamptonshire Steelbacks; 141/9 (20 overs)
D'Arcy Short 46 (40); Graeme White 2/36 (4 overs)		Adam Rossington 47 (31); Matthew Potts 2/11 (3 overs)

Durham won by 7 runs
Riverside Ground, Chester-le-Street
Umpires: Paul Pollard and Steve O'Shaughnessy
Player of the match: D'Arcy Short (Durham)

- Northamptonshire Steelbacks won the toss and elected to field.
- Matthew Potts and Scott Steel (Durham) both made their T20 debuts.
- Points: Durham 2, Northamptonshire Steelbacks 0.

19 July 2019
18:30 (D/N)
Scorecard

Lancashire Lightning	v	Leicestershire Foxes (H)

Match abandoned without a ball bowled
Grace Road, Leicester
Umpires: Ben Debenham and Mike Burns

- Leicestershire Foxes won the toss and elected to field.
- Points: Lancashire Lightning 1, Leicestershire Foxes 1.

19 July 2019
18:30 (D/N)
Scorecard

Yorkshire Vikings (H)	v	Nottinghamshire Outlaws

Match abandoned without a ball bowled
Headingley, Leeds

- No toss.
- Points: Yorkshire Vikings 1, Nottinghamshire Outlaws 1 .

20 July 2019
14:30
Scorecard

Yorkshire Vikings; 164/8 (20 overs)	v	Derbyshire Falcons (H); 166/5 (19.1 overs)
Jordan Thompson 50 (27); Mark Watt 4/19 (4 overs)		Billy Godleman 70* (56); Dom Bess 2/30 (4 overs)

Derbyshire Falcons won by 5 wickets
Queen's Park, Chesterfield
Umpires: Tom Lungley and Nigel Llong
Player of the match: Billy Godleman (Derbyshire Falcons)

- Yorkshire Vikings won the toss and elected to bat.
- Fynn Hudson-Prentice (Derbyshire Falcons) made his T20 debut.
- Points: Derbyshire Falcons 2, Yorkshire Vikings 0.

21 July 2019
14:30
Scorecard

Leicestershire Foxes; 115/9 (20 overs)	v	Birmingham Bears (H); 117/3 (14.5 overs)
Harry Dearden 27 (23); Fidel Edwards 4/22 (4 overs)		Ashton Agar 41* (28); Ben Mike 1/17 (1.5 overs)

Birmingham Bears won by 7 wickets
Edgbaston, Birmingham
Umpires: Neil Mallender and Ian Blackwell
Player of the match: Fidel Edwards (Birmingham Bears)

- Birmingham Bears won the toss and elected to field.
- Liam Banks (Birmingham Bears) made his T20 debut.
- Points: Birmingham Bears 2, Leicestershire Foxes 0.

21 July 2019
14:30
Scorecard

Lancashire Lightning (H); 189/3 (20 overs)	v	Durham; 117 (16.4 overs)
Steven Croft 65* (43); Nathan Rimmington 2/30 (4 overs)		Scott Steel 58 (46); Matt Parkinson 3/30 (3.4 overs)

Lancashire Lightning won by 72 runs
Old Trafford, Manchester
Umpires: Billy Taylor and Mike Burns
Player of the match: Glenn Maxwell (Lancashire Lightning)

- Lancashire Lightning won the toss and elected to bat.
- Points: Lancashire Lightning 2, Durham 0.

23 July 2019
18:30 (D/N)
Scorecard

Yorkshire Vikings; 255/2 (20 overs)	v	Leicestershire Foxes (H); 201/4 (20 overs)
Tom Kohler-Cadmore 96* (54); Dieter Klein 1/40 (4 overs)		Lewis Hill 49* (28); Jordan Thompson 1/19 (3 overs)

Yorkshire Vikings won by 54 runs
Grace Road, Leicester
Umpires: Billy Taylor and Alex Wharf
Player of the match: Tom Kohler-Cadmore (Yorkshire Vikings)

- Leicestershire Foxes won the toss and elected to field.
- Points: Yorkshire Vikings 2, Leicestershire Foxes 0.

24 July 2019
18:30 (D/N)
Scorecard

Northamptonshire Steelbacks; 152/8 (20 overs)	v	Nottinghamshire Outlaws (H); 155/3 (18.1 overs)
Josh Cobb 36 (28); Dan Christian 3/32 (4 overs)		Joe Clarke 45 (34); Graeme White 1/19 (4 overs)

Nottinghamshire Outlaws won by 7 wickets
Trent Bridge, Nottingham
Umpires: Peter Hartley and Russell Warren
Player of the match: Dan Christian (Nottinghamshire Outlaws)

- Northamptonshire Steelbacks won the toss and elected to bat.
- Points: Nottinghamshire Outlaws 2, Northamptonshire Steelbacks 0.

24 July 2019
19:00 (D/N)
Scorecard

Birmingham Bears (H); 205/5 (20 overs)	v	Derbyshire Falcons; 156/9 (20 overs)
Sam Hain 85 (61); Ravi Rampaul 3/21 (4 overs)		Leus du Plooy 70 (43); Fidel Edwards 2/29 (4 overs)

Birmingham Bears won by 49 runs
Edgbaston, Birmingham
Umpires: Mike Burns and Paul Baldwin
Player of the match: Sam Hain (Birmingham Bears)

- Derbyshire Falcons won the toss and elected to field.
- Points: Birmingham Bears 2, Derbyshire Falcons 0.

25 July 2019
19:00 (D/N)
Scorecard

Lancashire Lightning; 170/6 (20 overs)	v	Yorkshire Vikings (H); 161/9 (20 overs)
Dane Vilas 43 (24); Jack Shutt 2/31 (4 overs)		Nicholas Pooran 43 (31); Saqib Mahmood 3/33 (4 overs)

Lancashire Lightning won by 9 runs
Headingley, Leeds
Umpires: Neil Mallender and Jeff Evans
Player of the match: Saqib Mahmood (Lancashire Lightning)

- Lancashire Lightning won the toss and elected to bat.
- Jack Shutt (Yorkshire Vikings) made his T20 debut.
- Points: Lancashire Lightning 2, Yorkshire Vikings 0.

26 July 2019
18:30 (D/N)
Scorecard

Northamptonshire Steelbacks (H); 155/6 (20 overs)	v	Birmingham Bears; 111/8 (16 overs)
Rob Keogh 59* (48); Fidel Edwards 2/16 (4 overs)		Sam Hain 29 (23); Ben Sanderson 2/17 (3 overs)

Northamptonshire Steelbacks won by 21 runs (D/L/S method)
County Ground, Northampton
Umpires: Richard Illingworth and Ian Blackwell
Player of the match: Rob Keogh (Northamptonshire Steelbacks)

- Birmingham Bears won the toss and elected to field.
- Birmingham Bears' innings reduced to 16 overs due to rain.
- Points: Northamptonshire Steelbacks 2, Birmingham Bears 0.

26 July 2019
18:30 (D/N)
Scorecard

Leicestershire Foxes (H); 158 (20 overs)	v	Durham; 161/1 (11.1 overs)
Colin Ackermann 58 (41); Nathan Rimmington 3/26 (4 overs)		D'Arcy Short 77* (36); Chris Wright 1/34 (3.1 overs)

Durham won by 9 wickets
Grace Road, Leicester
Umpires: Jeff Evans and Paul Baldwin
Player of the match: D'Arcy Short (Durham)

- Leicestershire Foxes won the toss and elected to bat.
- Matthew Potts (Durham) took a hat-trick.
- Points: Durham 2, Leicestershire Foxes 0.

26 July 2019
18:30 (D/N)
Scorecard

Worcestershire Rapids; 130/9 (20 overs)	v	Lancashire Lightning (H); 71/1 (9 overs)
Martin Guptill 37 (33); Liam Livingstone 3/21 (4 overs)		Alex Davies 29* (24); Wayne Parnell 1/19 (2 overs)

Lancashire Lightning won by 21 runs (D/L/S method)
Old Trafford, Manchester
Umpires: Jeremy Lloyds and Rob White
Player of the match: Liam Livingstone (Lancashire Lightning)

- Worcestershire Rapids won the toss and elected to bat.
- Lancashire Lightning's innings was reduced to 9 overs due to rain.
- Points: Lancashire Lightning 2, Worcestershire Rapids 0.

26 July 2019
19:00 (D/N)
Scorecard

Derbyshire Falcons (H); 198/5 (20 overs)	v	Nottinghamshire Outlaws; 171/8 (20 overs)
Ben Duckett 64 (40 overs); Matt Critchley 2/43 (4 overs)		Luis Reece 61 (42); Harry Gurney 5/30 (4 overs)

Nottinghamshire Outlaws won by 27 runs
County Ground, Derby
Umpires: Neil Mallender and Chris Watts
Player of the match: Harry Gurney (Nottinghamshire Outlaws)

- Derbyshire Falcons won the toss and elected to field.
- Points: Nottinghamshire Outlaws 2, Derbyshire Falcons 0.

27 July 2019
14:30
Scorecard

Leicestershire Foxes; 125/3 (11 overs)	v	Nottinghamshire Outlaws (H); 104/6 (11 overs)
Arron Lilley 66 (30); Luke Wood 1/10 (1 over)		Tom Moores 44* (19); Gavin Griffiths 2/22 (3 overs)

Leicestershire Foxes won by 21 runs
Trent Bridge, Nottingham
Umpires: Jeremy Lloyds and Ian Blackwell
Player of the match: Arron Lilley (Leicestershire Foxes)

- Nottinghamshire Outlaws won the toss and elected to field.
- Match reduced to 11 overs per side due to rain.
- Points: Leicestershire Foxes 2, Nottinghamshire Outlaws 0.

28 July 2019
14:30
Scorecard

Durham; 181/8 (20 overs)	v	Worcestershire Rapids (H); 184/1 (12.1 overs)
Alex Lees 44 (31); Dillon Pennington 2/26 (3 overs)		Martin Guptill 86* (31); Brydon Carse 1/37 (3 overs)

Worcestershire Rapids won by 9 wickets
New Road, Worcester
Umpires: Paul Pollard and Jeff Evans
Player of the match: Martin Guptill (Worcestershire Rapids)

- Worcestershire Rapids won the toss and elected to field.
- Points: Worcestershire Rapids 2, Durham 0.

28 July 2019
14:30
Scorecard

Derbyshire Falcons (H)	v	Lancashire Lightning

Match abandoned without a ball bowled
County Ground, Derby
Umpires: Steve O'Shaughnessy and Paul Baldwin

- No toss.
- Points: Derbyshire Falcons 1, Lancashire Lightning 1.

28 July 2019
14:30
Scorecard

Northamptonshire Steelbacks (H)	v	Yorkshire Vikings

Match abandoned without a ball bowled
County Ground, Northampton

- No toss.
- Points: Northamptonshire Steelbacks 1, Yorkshire Vikings 1.

31 July 2019
17:00
Scorecard

Derbyshire Falcons; 156/4 (20 overs)	v	Worcestershire Rapids (H); 159/8 (19 overs)
Leus du Plooy 52* (48); Brett D'Oliveira 2/25 (3 overs)		Wayne Parnell 81* (46); Ravi Rampaul 2/17 (4 overs)

Worcestershire Rapids won by 2 wickets
New Road, Worcester
Umpires: Richard Illingworth and Chris Watts
Player of the match: Wayne Parnell (Worcestershire Rapids)

- Worcestershire Rapids won the toss and elected to field.
- Points: Worcestershire Rapids 2, Derbyshire Falcons 0.

31 July 2019
18:30 (D/N)
Scorecard

Leicestershire Foxes; 142/7 (20 overs)	v	Durham (H); 143/2 (14.4 overs)
Colin Ackermann 52 (41); D'Arcy Short 2/23 (4 overs)		D'Arcy Short 70 (36); Callum Parkinson 2/36 (4 overs)

Durham won by 8 wickets
Riverside Ground, Chester-le-Street
Umpires: Nick Cook and Rob Bailey
Player of the match: D'Arcy Short (Durham)

- Durham won the toss and elected to field.
- Points: Durham 2, Leicestershire Foxes 0.

==== August ====
2 August 2019
18:30 (D/N)
Scorecard

Yorkshire Vikings (H); 177/7 (20 overs)	v	Worcestershire Rapids; 179/5 (17.3 overs)
Adam Lyth 68 (48); George Rhodes 2/12 (2 overs)		Riki Wessels 91 (51); Duanne Olivier 2/29 (3 overs)

Worcestershire Rapids won by 5 wickets
Headingley, Leeds
Umpires: James Middlebrook and Nick Cook
Player of the match: Riki Wessels (Worcestershire Rapids)

- Yorkshire Vikings won the toss and elected to bat.
- Points: Worcestershire Rapids 2, Yorkshire Vikings 0.

2 August 2019
18:30 (D/N)
Scorecard

Durham (H); 139 (19.5 overs)	v	Lancashire Lightning; 140/5 (18.5 overs)
Alex Lees 39 (37); Matt Parkinson 4/30 (4 overs)		Liam Livingstone 70 (48); D'Arcy Short 2/27 (4 overs)

Lancashire Lightning won by 5 wickets
Riverside Ground, Chester-le-Street
Umpires: Tom Lungley and Rob Bailey
Player of the match: Liam Livingstone (Lancashire Lightning)

- Durham won the toss and elected to bat.
- Points: Lancashire Lightning 2, Durham 0.

2 August 2019
18:30 (D/N)
Scorecard

Nottinghamshire Outlaws (H); 184/4 (20 overs)	v	Birmingham Bears; 113 (17.3 overs)
Tom Moores 69 (38); Olly Stone 1/29 (4 overs)		Sam Hain 29 (28); Matthew Carter 3/14 (4 overs)

Nottinghamshire Outlaws won by 71 runs
Trent Bridge, Nottingham
Umpires: Paul Pollard and Alex Wharf
Player of the match: Matthew Carter (Nottinghamshire Outlaws)

- Nottinghamshire Outlaws won the toss and elected to bat.
- Points: Nottinghamshire Outlaws 2, Birmingham Bears 0.

2 August 2019
19:00 (D/N)
Scorecard

Northamptonshire Steelbacks (H); 180/5 (20 overs)	v	Derbyshire Falcons; 184/4 (18 overs)
Josh Cobb 84 (50); Ravi Rampaul 3/17 (4 overs)		Luis Reece 60 (37); Josh Cobb 1/17 (2 overs)

Derbyshire Falcons won by 6 wickets
County Ground, Northampton
Umpires: Neil Bainton and Jeremy Lloyds
Player of the match: Wayne Madsen (Derbyshire Falcons)

- Northamptonshire Steelbacks won the toss and elected to bat.
- Points: Derbyshire Falcons 2, Northamptonshire Steelbacks 0.

3 August 2019
19:00 (D/N)
Scorecard

Lancashire Lightning (H); 151/6 (20 overs)	v	Nottinghamshire Outlaws; 148/9 (20 overs)
Glenn Maxwell 73 (46); Luke Wood 2/10 (3 overs)		Dan Christian 41* (24); Matt Parkinson 3/22 (4 overs)

Lancashire Lightning won by 3 runs
Old Trafford, Manchester
Umpires: Neil Mallender and Nick Cook
Player of the match: Glenn Maxwell (Lancashire Lightning)

- Lancashire Lightning won the toss and elected to bat.
- Points: Lancashire Lightning 2, Nottinghamshire Outlaws 0.

4 August 2019
14:30
Scorecard

Birmingham Bears; 177/4 (20 overs)	v	Yorkshire Vikings (H); 177/4 (20 overs)
Dominic Sibley 64 (43); Duanne Olivier 2/31 (3 overs)		Tom Kohler-Cadmore 76* (54); Jeetan Patel 2/21 (4 overs)

Match tied
Headingley, Leeds
Umpires: Paul Pollard and Rob Bailey
Player of the match: Tom Kohler-Cadmore (Yorkshire Vikings)

- Yorkshire Vikings won the toss and elected to field.
- Points: Yorkshire Vikings 1, Birmingham Bears 1.

4 August 2019
14:30
Scorecard

Leicestershire Foxes; 152 (20 overs)	v	Worcestershire Rapids (H); 119 (19.2 overs)
Colin Ackermann 37 (30); Wayne Parnell 4/25 (4 overs)		Ben Cox 30 (29); Gavin Griffiths 3/23 (3.2 overs)

Leicestershire Foxes won by 33 runs
New Road, Worcester
Umpires: Graham Lloyd and Steve O'Shaughnessy
Player of the match: Colin Ackermann (Leicestershire Foxes)

- Worcestershire Rapids won the toss and elected to field.
- Points: Leicestershire Foxes 2, Worcestershire Rapids 0.

7 August 2019
18:30 (D/N)
Scorecard

Northamptonshire Steelbacks (H); 145/6 (20 overs)	v	Durham; 124/8 (20 overs)
Alex Wakely 47* (35); Matthew Potts 3/31 (4 overs)		Peter Handscomb 65* (54); Rob Keogh 3/30 (4 overs)

Northamptonshire Steelbacks won by 21 runs
County Ground, Northampton
Umpires: Ben Debenham and Richard Illingworth
Player of the match: Alex Wakely (Northamptonshire Steelbacks)

- Durham won the toss and elected to field.
- Points: Northamptonshire Steelbacks 2, Durham 0.

7 August 2019
18:30 (D/N)
Scorecard

Leicestershire Foxes (H); 189/6 (20 overs)	v	Birmingham Bears; 134 (17.4 overs)
Harry Swindells 63 (50); Henry Brookes 3/26 (4 overs)		Sam Hain 61 (44); Colin Ackermann 7/18 (4 overs)

Leicestershire Foxes won by 55 runs
Grace Road, Leicester
Umpires: Mike Burns and David Millns
Player of the match: Colin Ackermann (Leicestershire Foxes)

- Leicestershire Foxes won the toss and elected to bat.
- Colin Ackermann (Leicestershire Foxes) recorded the best T20 bowling figures of all time.
- Points: Leicestershire Foxes 2, Birmingham Bears 0.

9 August 2019
18:30 (D/N)
Scorecard

Lancashire Lightning (H)	v	Yorkshire Vikings

Match abandoned without a ball bowled
Old Trafford, Manchester
Umpires: Ian Gould and Jeremy Lloyds

- No toss.
- Points: Lancashire Lightning 1, Yorkshire Vikings 1.

9 August 2019
18:30 (D/N)
Scorecard

Leicestershire Foxes (H); 137/9 (20 overs)	v	Northamptonshire Steelbacks; 16/0 (2.4 overs)
Harry Dearden 37 (31); Ben Sanderson 4/28 (4 overs)		Richard Levi 12* (10)

No result
Grace Road, Leicester
Umpires: Russell Warren and Rob Bailey

- Leicestershire Foxes won the toss and elected to field.
- Points: Leicestershire Foxes 1, Northamptonshire Steelbacks 1.

9 August 2019
19:00 (D/N)
Scorecard

Durham; 160/5 (20 overs)	v	Derbyshire Falcons (H); 153/7 (20 overs)
D'Arcy Short 68 (48); Matt Critchley 2/22 (4 overs)		Billy Godleman 39 (20); Liam Trevaskis 3/16 (4 overs)

Durham won by 7 runs
County Ground, Derby
Umpires: Paul Pollard and Mike Burns
Player of the match: Liam Trevaskis (Durham)

- Durham won the toss and elected to bat.
- Points: Durham 2, Derbyshire Falcons 0.

9 August 2019
19:00 (D/N)
Scorecard

Birmingham Bears (H); 119/9 (20 overs)	v	Nottinghamshire Outlaws; 86/2 (11 overs)
Sam Hain 49 (47); Luke Wood 3/24 (4 overs)		Joe Clarke 47* (32); Jeetan Patel 1/17 (3 overs)

Nottinghamshire Outlaws won by 28 runs (D/L/S method)
Edgbaston, Birmingham
Umpires: Graham Lloyd and Ben Debenham
Player of the match: Joe Clarke (Nottinghamshire Outlaws)

- Nottinghamshire Outlaws won the toss and elected to field.
- Points: Nottinghamshire Outlaws 2, Birmingham Bears 0.

11 August 2019
14:30
Scorecard

Durham (H)	v	Nottinghamshire Outlaws

Match abandoned without a ball bowled
Riverside Ground, Chester-le-Street

- No toss.
- Points: Durham 1, Nottinghamshire Outlaws 1.

11 August 2019
14:30
Scorecard

Worcestershire Rapids (H)	v	Northamptonshire Steelbacks

Match abandoned without a ball bowled
New Road, Worcester
Umpires: Martin Saggers and Rob Bailey

- No toss.
- Points: Worcestershire Rapids 1, Northamptonshire Steelbacks 1.

11 August 2019
14:30
Scorecard

Birmingham Bears (H); 179/6 (20 overs)	v	Lancashire Lightning; 164/7 (20 overs)
Adam Hose 65 (34); Matt Parkinson 3/23 (4 overs)		Glenn Maxwell 79 (39); Will Rhodes 2/25 (3 overs)

Birmingham Bears won by 15 runs
Edgbaston, Birmingham
Umpires: Mike Burns and Russell Warren
Player of the match: Adam Hose (Birmingham Bears)

- Birmingham Bears won the toss and elected to bat.
- Matthew Lamb (Birmingham Bears) made his T20 debut.
- Points: Birmingham Bears 2, Lancashire Lightning 0.

11 August 2019
15:00
Scorecard

Derbyshire Falcons; 207/5 (20 overs)	v	Yorkshire Vikings (H); 152 (17.1 overs)
Wayne Madsen 66 (37); Tim Bresnan 2/17 (2 overs)		Jack Leaning 36 (30); Logan van Beek 4/17 (3 overs)

Derbyshire Falcons won by 55 runs
Headingley, Leeds
Umpires: Ben Debenham and Ian Gould
Player of the match: Wayne Madsen (Derbyshire Falcons)

- Yorkshire Vikings won the toss and elected to field.
- Points: Derbyshire Falcons 2, Yorkshire Vikings 0.

13 August 2019
19:00 (D/N)
Scorecard

Derbyshire Falcons (H); 181/2 (20 overs)	v	Worcestershire Rapids; 161/7 (20 overs)
Billy Godleman 92 (67); Daryl Mitchell 1/23 (4 overs)		Martin Guptill 45 (40); Matt Critchley 4/36 (4 overs)

Derbyshire Falcons won by 20 runs
County Ground, Derby
Umpires: Steve O'Shaughnessy and Ian Blackwell
Player of the match: Billy Godleman (Derbyshire Falcons)

- Derbyshire Falcons won the toss and elected to bat.
- Points: Derbyshire Falcons 2, Worcestershire Rapids 0.

14 August 2019
18:30 (D/N)
Scorecard

Northamptonshire Steelbacks (H); 157/7 (20 overs)	v	Lancashire Lightning; 160/2 (18.3 overs)
Adam Rossington 40 (32); James Faulkner 3/36 (4 overs)		Alex Davies 75* (58); Josh Cobb 1/24 (3 overs)

Lancashire Lightning won by 8 wickets
County Ground, Northampton
Umpires: Peter Hartley and Nick Cook
Player of the match: Alex Davies (Lancashire Lightning)

- Lancashire Lightning won the toss and elected to field.
- Points: Lancashire Lightning 2, Northamptonshire Steelbacks 0.

15 August 2019
18:30 (D/N)
Scorecard

Worcestershire Rapids; 117/7 (20 overs)	v	Durham (H); 114/6 (20 overs)
Tom Fell 28 (24); Matthew Potts 3/22 (3 overs)		D'Arcy Short 42 (40); Daryl Mitchell 2/17 (4 overs)

Worcestershire Rapids won by 3 runs
Riverside Ground, Chester-le-Street
Umpires: David Millns and Paul Baldwin
Player of the match: Pat Brown (Worcestershire Rapids)

- Durham won the toss and elected to field.
- Points: Worcestershire Rapids 2, Durham 0.

15 August 2019
19:05 (D/N)
Scorecard

Leicestershire Foxes; 149/7 (20 overs)	v	Derbyshire Falcons (H); 94 (18.2 overs)
Mark Cosgrove 38 (26); Matt Critchley 2/25 (4 overs)		Matt Critchley 21 (20); Colin Ackermann 3/9 (4 overs)

Leicestershire Foxes won by 55 runs
County Ground, Derby
Umpires: Neil Mallender and Martin Saggers
Player of the match: Colin Ackermann (Leicestershire Foxes)

- Leicestershire Foxes won the toss and elected to bat.
- Points: Leicestershire Foxes 2, Derbyshire Falcons 0.

16 August 2019
18:30 (D/N)
Scorecard

Nottinghamshire Outlaws (H)	v	Derbyshire Falcons

Match abandoned without a ball bowled
Trent Bridge, Nottingham

- No toss.
- Points: Nottinghamshire Outlaws 1, Derbyshire Falcons 1.

16 August 2019
18:30 (D/N)
Scorecard

Northamptonshire Steelbacks (H)	v	Leicestershire Foxes

Match abandoned without a ball bowled
County Ground, Northampton
Umpires: Paul Pollard and James Middlebrook

- No toss.
- Points: Northamptonshire Steelbacks 1, Leicestershire Foxes 1.

16 August 2019
18:30 (D/N)
Scorecard

Lancashire Lightning (H)	v	Birmingham Bears

Match abandoned without a ball bowled
Old Trafford, Manchester

- No toss.
- Points: Lancashire Lightning 1, Birmingham Bears 1.

16 August 2019
19:00 (D/N)
Scorecard

Yorkshire Vikings (H)	v	Durham

Match abandoned without a ball bowled
Headingley, Leeds
Umpires: Graham Lloyd and Mike Burns

- No toss.
- Points: Yorkshire Vikings 1, Durham 1.

23 August 2019
18:30 (D/N)
Scorecard

Yorkshire Vikings; 146/6 (20 overs)	v	Durham (H); 132 (19 overs)
Tom Kohler-Cadmore 52 (42); Nathan Rimmington 3/16 (3 overs)		Scott Steel 49 (42); Jack Shutt 5/11 (4 overs)

Yorkshire Vikings won by 14 runs
Riverside Ground, Chester-le-Street
Umpires: Martin Saggers and Russell Warren
Player of the match: Jack Shutt (Yorkshire Vikings)

- Durham won the toss and elected to field.
- Harry Adair (Durham) made his T20 debut.
- Points: Yorkshire Vikings 2, Durham 0.

23 August 2019
18:30 (D/N)
Scorecard

Leicestershire Foxes (H); 161/8 (20 overs)	v	Nottinghamshire Outlaws; 165/3 (18.5 overs)
Harry Swindells 61 (46); Luke Fletcher 3/17 (3 overs)		Alex Hales 60 (39); Colin Ackermann 1/22 (3 overs)

Nottinghamshire Outlaws won by 7 wickets
Grace Road, Leicester
Umpires: Graham Lloyd and Paul Baldwin
Player of the match: Alex Hales (Nottinghamshire Outlaws)

- Leicestershire Foxes won the toss and elected to bat.
- Points: Nottinghamshire Outlaws 2, Leicestershire Foxes 0.

23 August 2019
19:00 (D/N)
Scorecard

Birmingham Bears (H); 184/5 (20 overs)	v	Worcestershire Rapids; 188/1 (18.4 overs)
Adam Hose 48 (23); Ed Barnard 2/43 (4 overs)		Moeen Ali 85* (46); Chris Green 1/27 (3.4 overs)

Worcestershire Rapids won by 9 wickets
Edgbaston, Birmingham
Umpires: Neil Bainton and Jeremy Lloyds
Player of the match: Moeen Ali (Worcestershire Rapids)

- Birmingham Bears won the toss and elected to bat.
- Points: Worcestershire Rapids 2, Birmingham Bears 0.

23 August 2019
19:00 (D/N)
Scorecard

Northamptonshire Steelbacks; 100 (18 overs)	v	Derbyshire Falcons (H); 101/1 (17.1 overs)
Rob Keogh 28 (31); Alex Hughes 3/13 (4 overs)		Wayne Madsen 51* (42); Rob Keogh 1/12 (4 overs)

Derbyshire Falcons won by 9 wickets
County Ground, Derby
Umpires: David Millns and Steve O'Shaughnessy
Player of the match: Wayne Madsen (Derbyshire Falcons)

- Northamptonshire Steelbacks won the toss and elected to bat.
- Points: Derbyshire Falcons 2, Northamptonshire Steelbacks 0.

25 August 2019
14:30
Scorecard

Leicestershire Foxes (H); 124/9 (20 overs)	v	Derbyshire Falcons; 128/1 (18.3 overs)
Mark Cosgrove 45 (26); Luis Reece 2/9 (2 overs)		Billy Godleman 52* (58); Callum Parkinson 1/25 (4 overs)

Derbyshire Falcons won by 9 wickets
Grace Road, Leicester
Umpires: Nick Cook and Rob Bailey
Player of the match: Billy Godleman (Derbyshire Falcons)

- Leicestershire Foxes won the toss and elected to bat.
- Points: Derbyshire Falcons 2, Leicestershire Foxes 0.

25 August 2019
14:30
Scorecard

Lancashire Lightning; 218/5 (20 overs)	v	Worcestershire Rapids (H); 193/7 (20 overs)
Steven Croft 94 (55); Ed Barnard 2/42 (4 overs)		Ross Whiteley 89* (40); Glenn Maxwell 3/23 (4 overs)

Lancashire Lightning won by 25 runs
New Road, Worcester
Umpires: Neil Bainton and Steve O'Shaughnessy
Player of the match: Steven Croft (Lancashire Lightning)

- Worcestershire Rapids won the toss and elected to field.
- Points: Lancashire Lightning 2, Worcestershire Rapids 0.

25 August 2019
14:30
Scorecard

Birmingham Bears (H); 150/6 (20 overs)	v	Northamptonshire Steelbacks; 153/6 (19.4 overs)
Will Rhodes 45 (31); Rob Keogh 2/23 (4 overs)		Richard Levi 44 (27); Jeetan Patel 2/21 (4 overs)

Northamptonshire Steelbacks won by 4 wickets
Edgbaston, Birmingham
Umpires: Paul Pollard and Martin Saggers
Player of the match: Josh Cobb (Northamptonshire Steelbacks)

- Birmingham Bears won the toss and elected to bat.
- Points: Northamptonshire Steelbacks 2, Birmingham Bears 0.

25 August 2019
15:30
Scorecard

Nottinghamshire Outlaws (H); 148/7 (20 overs)	v	Yorkshire Vikings; 145/7 (20 overs)
Joe Clarke 50 (46); Adam Lyth 5/31 (4 overs)		Adam Lyth 48 (39); Harry Gurney 2/29 (4 overs)

Nottinghamshire Outlaws won by 3 runs
Trent Bridge, Nottingham
Umpires: Graham Lloyd and Jeremy Lloyds
Player of the match: Matthew Carter (Nottinghamshire Outlaws)

- Nottinghamshire Outlaws won the toss and elected to bat.
- Points: Nottinghamshire Outlaws 2, Yorkshire Vikings 0.

26 August 2019
14:30
Scorecard

Derbyshire Falcons; 162/3 (20 overs)	v	Lancashire Lightning (H); 151/9 (20 overs)
Wayne Madsen 69 (39); Steven Croft 1/13 (3 overs)		Liam Livingstone 58 (36); Ravi Rampaul 3/19 (4 overs)

Derbyshire Falcons won by 11 runs
Old Trafford, Manchester
Umpires: Martin Saggers and Alex Wharf
Player of the match: Wayne Madsen (Derbyshire Falcons)

- Derbyshire Falcons won the toss and elected to bat.
- Liam Hurt (Lancashire Lightning) made his T20 debut.
- Points: Derbyshire Falcons 2, Lancashire Lightning 0.

27 August 2019
18:30 (D/N)
Scorecard

Durham (H); 151/5 (19 overs)	v	Birmingham Bears; 153/3 (18.5 overs)
D'Arcy Short 50 (39); Will Rhodes 1/17 (2 overs)		Ed Pollock 77 (45); D'Arcy Short 2/33 (4 overs)

Birmingham Bears won by 7 wickets
Riverside Ground, Chester-le-Street
Umpires: Peter Hartley and Jeff Evans
Player of the match: Ed Pollock (Birmingham Bears)

- Birmingham Bears won the toss and elected to field.
- Match reduced to 19 overs per side due to rain.
- George Garrett (Birmingham Bears) made his T20 debut.
- Points: Birmingham Bears 2, Durham 0.

28 August 2019
16:00
Scorecard

Worcestershire Rapids (H)	v	Nottinghamshire Outlaws

Match abandoned without a ball bowled
New Road, Worcester
Umpires: Martin Saggers and Alex Wharf

- No toss.
- Points: Worcestershire Rapids 1, Nottinghamshire Outlaws 1.

29 August 2019
18:30 (D/N)
Scorecard

Yorkshire Vikings (H); 187/7 (20 overs)	v	Northamptonshire Steelbacks; 107 (18 overs)
Tom Kohler-Cadmore 51 (41); Graeme White 2/18 (4 overs)		Tom Sole 41* (35); David Willey 4/18 (4 overs)

Yorkshire Vikings won by 80 runs
Headingley, Leeds
Umpires: Peter Hartley and Tim Robinson
Player of the match: David Willey (Yorkshire Vikings)

- Yorkshire Vikings won the toss and elected to bat.
- Points: Yorkshire Vikings 2, Northamptonshire Steelbacks 0.

30 August 2019
18:30 (D/N)
Scorecard

Durham; 171/8 (20 overs)	v	Nottinghamshire Outlaws (H); 124 (17.2 overs)
Scott Steel 45 (24); Dan Christian 3/26 (3 overs)		Tom Moores 33 (26); Nathan Rimmington 3/15 (3 overs)

Durham won by 47 runs
Trent Bridge, Nottingham
Umpires: Billy Taylor and Neil Mallender
Player of the match: Nathan Rimmington (Durham)

- Durham won the toss and elected to bat.
- Points: Durham 2, Nottinghamshire Outlaws 0.

30 August 2019
18:30 (D/N)
Scorecard

Leicestershire Foxes; 142/9 (20 overs)	v	Lancashire Lightning (H); 143/5 (18.4 overs)
Mark Cosgrove 39 (19); Matt Parkinson 2/26 (4 overs)		Alex Davies 39 (30); Callum Parkinson 2/17 (4 overs)

Lancashire Lightning won by 5 wickets
Old Trafford, Manchester
Umpires: Russell Warren and Ian Blackwell
Player of the match: Glenn Maxwell (Lancashire Lightning)

- Leicestershire Foxes won the toss and elected to bat.
- Points: Lancashire Lightning 2, Leicestershire Foxes 0.

30 August 2019
18:30 (D/N)
Scorecard

Yorkshire Vikings; 200/3 (20 overs)	v	Birmingham Bears (H); 181/5 (20 overs)
Tom Kohler-Cadmore 94* (63); George Garrett 1/19 (3 overs)		Sam Hain 64* (46); Tim Bresnan 2/30 (3 overs)

Yorkshire Vikings won by 19 runs
Edgbaston, Birmingham
Umpires: David Millns and Rob White
Player of the match: Tom Kohler-Cadmore (Yorkshire Vikings)

- Birmingham Bears won the toss and elected to field.
- Points: Yorkshire Vikings 2, Birmingham Bears 0.

30 August 2019
18:30 (D/N)
Scorecard

Worcestershire Rapids; 188/5 (20 overs)	v	Northamptonshire Steelbacks (H); 189/3 (18.5 overs)
Moeen Ali 51 (31); Rob Keogh 2/12 (2 overs)		Josh Cobb 62 (32); Pat Brown 1/25 (3.5 overs)

Northamptonshire Steelbacks won by 7 wickets
County Ground, Northampton
Umpires: Steve O'Shaughnessy and Nick Cook
Player of the match: Josh Cobb (Northamptonshire Steelbacks)

- Worcestershire Rapids won the toss and elected to bat.
- Points: Northamptonshire Steelbacks 2, Worcestershire Rapids 0.

=== South Group ===
==== July ====
18 July 2019
18:15 (D/N)
Scorecard

Essex Eagles; 164/6 (20 overs)	v	Middlesex (H); 166/3 (17 overs)
Ryan ten Doeschate 74* (46); Tom Helm 3/27 (4 overs)		AB de Villiers 88* (43); Matt Quinn 1/20 (3 overs)

Middlesex won by 7 wickets
Lord's, London
Umpires: Graham Lloyd and Rob Bailey
Player of the match: AB de Villiers (Middlesex)

- Middlesex won the toss and elected to field.
- Points: Middlesex 2, Essex Eagles 0.

18 July 2019
18:30 (D/N)
Scorecard

Glamorgan (H); 180/5 (20 overs)	v	Somerset; 181/2 (18 overs)
David Lloyd 57 (37); Roelof van der Merwe 2/17 (4 overs)		Tom Banton 64 (34); Andrew Salter 1/22 (2 overs)

Somerset won by 8 wickets
Sophia Gardens, Cardiff
Umpires: James Middlebrook and Richard Illingworth
Player of the match: Tom Banton (Somerset)

- Somerset won the toss and elected to field.
- Jeremy Lawlor and Owen Morgan (both Glamorgan) made their T20 debuts.
- Points: Somerset 2, Glamorgan 0.

19 July 2019
14:30
Scorecard

Glamorgan; 96/8 (15.3 overs)	v	Gloucestershire (H)
David Lloyd 21 (20); Benny Howell 5/18 (4 overs)

No result
College Ground, Cheltenham
Umpires: Nick Cook and Russell Warren

- Gloucestershire won the toss and elected to field.
- James Bracey (Gloucestershire) made his T20 debut.
- Points: Glamorgan 1, Gloucestershire 1.

19 July 2019
19:00 (D/N)
Scorecard

Essex Eagles (H); 226/4 (15 overs)	v	Surrey; 174/7 (15 overs)
Cameron Delport 129 (49); Gareth Batty 2/38 (3 overs)		Rory Burns 47* (26); Matt Quinn 3/34 (3 overs)

Essex Eagles won by 52 runs
County Ground, Chelmsford
Umpires: Jeff Evans and Jeremy Lloyds
Player of the match: Cameron Delport (Essex Eagles)

- Surrey won the toss and elected to field.
- Points: Essex Eagles 2, Surrey 0.

19 July 2019
19:00 (D/N)
Scorecard

Hampshire (H)	v	Sussex Sharks

Match abandoned without a ball bowled
Rose Bowl, Southampton
Umpires: Graham Lloyd and David Millns

- Sussex Sharks won the toss and elected to field.
- Points: Hampshire 1, Sussex Sharks 1.

20 July 2019
19:00 (D/N)
Scorecard

Kent Spitfires (H); 165/9 (20 overs)	v	Somerset; 124 (18.3 overs)
Ollie Robinson 53 (49); Roelof van der Merwe 3/19 (4 overs)		Tom Banton 28 (24); Imran Qayyum 5/21 (4 overs)

Kent Spitfires won by 41 runs
St Lawrence Ground, Canterbury
Umpires: Jeremy Lloyds and Rob Bailey
Player of the match: Imran Qayyum (Kent Spitfires)

- Kent Spitfires won the toss and elected to bat.
- Ollie Robinson, Jordan Cox (both Kent Spitfires) and Tom Lammonby (Somerset) made their T20 debuts.
- Imran Qayyum took the first five-wicket haul by a spin bowler for Kent in a T20 match.
- Points: Kent Spitfires 2, Somerset 0.

21 July 2019
14:30
Scorecard

Hampshire (H); 145/5 (20 overs)	v	Kent Spitfires; 146/8 (19.5 overs)
James Vince 51 (35); Hardus Viljoen 2/20 (4 overs)		Alex Blake 57* (38); Kyle Abbott 3/22 (4 overs)

Kent Spitfires won by 2 wickets
Rose Bowl, Southampton
Umpires: Jeff Evans and Nick Cook
Player of the match: Alex Blake (Kent Spitfires)

- Hampshire won the toss and elected to bat.
- Points: Kent Spitfires 2, Hampshire 0.

23 July 2019
18:30 (D/N)
Scorecard

Middlesex; 209/3 (20 overs)	v	Surrey (H); 172/9 (20 overs)
Dawid Malan 117 (57); Tom Curran 2/29 (4 overs)		Ollie Pope 47 (31); Toby Roland-Jones 4/35 (4 overs)

Middlesex won by 37 runs
The Oval, London
Umpires: Tim Robinson and Nigel Llong
Player of the match: Dawid Malan (Middlesex)

- Middlesex won the toss and elected to bat.
- Points: Middlesex 2, Surrey 0.

24 July 2019
19:00 (D/N)
Scorecard

Sussex Sharks (H); 188/6 (20 overs)	v	Hampshire; 174 (19 overs)
Phil Salt 73 (46); Chris Wood 2/30 (4 overs)		Rilee Rossouw 60 (38); Reece Topley 4/33 (4 overs)

Sussex Sharks won by 14 runs
County Ground, Hove
Umpires: Tim Robinson and Steve O'Shaughnessy
Player of the match: Reece Topley (Sussex Sharks)

- Hampshire won the toss and elected to field.
- Rilee Rossouw retired hurt on 47* at 99/6, before returning at 112/7.
- Points: Sussex Sharks 2, Hampshire 0.

25 July 2019
14:30
Scorecard

Middlesex; 148/9 (20 overs)	v	Gloucestershire (H); 151/8 (19.2 overs)
John Simpson 42* (29); David Payne 3/32 (4 overs)		Miles Hammond 63 (35); Steven Finn 3/30 (4 overs)

Gloucestershire won by 2 wickets
College Ground, Cheltenham
Umpires: Graham Lloyd and Billy Taylor
Player of the match: Miles Hammond (Gloucestershire)

- Middlesex won the toss and elected to bat.
- Dan Lincoln (Middlesex) made his T20 debut.
- Points: Gloucestershire 2, Middlesex 0.

25 July 2019
18:30 (D/N)
Scorecard

Surrey (H); 141 (20 overs)	v	Glamorgan; 44 (12.5 overs)
Will Jacks 40 (26); Marchant de Lange 4/26 (2.5 overs)		Fakhar Zaman 17 (27); Tom Curran 3/3 (2 overs)

Surrey won by 97 runs
The Oval, London
Umpires: Ben Debenham and Alex Wharf
Player of the match: Tom Curran (Surrey)

- Glamorgan won the toss and elected to field.
- Tom Curran (Surrey) took a hat-trick.
- This was Glamorgan's lowest total in a T20 match.
- Points: Surrey 2, Glamorgan 0.

26 July 2019
18:30 (D/N)
Scorecard

Somerset (H); 172/3 (20 overs)	v	Hampshire; 174/6 (19.3 overs)
Babar Azam 95* (61); Chris Wood 1/22 (4 overs)		Aneurin Donald 48 (34); Lewis Gregory 2/31 (4 overs)

Hampshire won by 4 wickets
County Ground, Taunton
Umpires: Graham Lloyd and Billy Taylor
Player of the match: James Fuller (Hampshire)

- Hampshire won the toss and elected to field.
- Points: Hampshire 2, Somerset 0.

26 July 2019
18:30 (D/N)
Scorecard

Glamorgan (H); 136 (19.3 overs)	v	Middlesex; 137/2 (17.2 overs)
Chris Cooke 29 (16); Toby Roland-Jones 5/21 (3.3 overs)		Stephen Eskinazi 51 (29); Marchant de Lange 1/16 (3.2 overs)

Middlesex won by 8 wickets
Sophia Gardens, Cardiff
Umpires: Mark Newell and David Millns
Player of the match: Toby Roland-Jones (Middlesex)

- Middlesex won the toss and elected to field.
- Toby Roland-Jones (Middlesex) took a hat-trick.
- Points: Middlesex 2, Glamorgan 0.

26 July 2019
19:00 (D/N)
Scorecard

Kent Spitfires (H); 175/6 (20 overs)	v	Essex Eagles; 153/7 (20 overs)
Heino Kuhn 55* (31); Matt Quinn 2/40 (4 overs)		Ryan ten Doeschate 58* (46); Hardus Viljoen 2/28 (4 overs)

Kent Spitfires won by 22 runs
St Lawrence Ground, Canterbury
Umpires: Tim Robinson and Ben Debenham
Player of the match: Heino Kuhn (Kent Spitfires)

- Kent Spitfires won the toss and elected to field first.
- Points: Kent Spitfires 2, Essex Eagles 0.

26 July 2019
19:00 (D/N)
Scorecard

Sussex Sharks (H); 144/8 (20 overs)	v	Surrey; 144/8 (20 overs)
Luke Wright 76* (59); Gareth Batty 3/20 (4 overs)		Ollie Pope 43 (29); Tymal Mills 2/16 (4 overs)

Match tied
County Ground, Hove
Umpires: Paul Pollard and Neil Bainton
Player of the match: Luke Wright (Sussex Sharks)

- Surrey won the toss and elected to field.
- Ryan Patel (Surrey) made his T20 debut.
- Points: Sussex Sharks 1, Surrey 1.

27 July 2019
19:00 (D/N)
Scorecard

Essex Eagles (H)	v	Gloucestershire

Match abandoned without a ball bowled
County Ground, Chelmsford

- No toss.
- Points: Essex Eagles 1, Gloucestershire 1.

28 July 2019
14:30
Scorecard

Sussex Sharks; 184/8 (20 overs)	v	Somerset (H); 171/5 (20 overs)
Alex Carey 78 (46); Lewis Gregory 3/30 (4 overs)		Babar Azam 83 (50); Ollie Robinson 1/24 (3 overs)

Sussex Sharks won by 13 runs
County Ground, Taunton
Umpires: Richard Illingworth and Martin Saggers
Player of the match: Alex Carey (Sussex Sharks)

- Somerset won the toss and elected to field.
- Points: Sussex Sharks 2, Somerset 0.

30 July 2019
18:30
Scorecard

Surrey (H); 54/4 (7 overs)	v	Kent Spitfires; 55/1 (4 overs)
Aaron Finch 36* (20); Hardus Viljoen 2/10 (2 overs)		Mohammad Nabi 43* (12); Imran Tahir 1/22 (2 overs)

Kent Spitfires won by 9 wickets
The Oval, London
Umpires: Neil Mallender and Russell Warren
Player of the match: Mohammad Nabi (Kent Spitfires)

- Kent Spitfires won the toss and elected to field.
- Match reduced to 7 overs per side due to rain.
- Points: Kent Spitfires 2, Surrey 0.

==== August ====
1 August 2019
18:15 (D/N)
Scorecard

Kent Spitfires; 204/4 (20 overs)	v	Middlesex (H); 176/7 (20 overs)
Alex Blake 66* (29); Steven Finn 2/40 (4 overs)		John Simpson 37 (27); Hardus Viljoen 3/32 (4 overs)

Kent Spitfires won by 28 runs
Lord's, London
Umpires: Ian Gould and David Millns
Player of the match: Alex Blake

- Middlesex won the toss and elected to field.
- Points: Kent Spitfires 2, Middlesex 0.

1 August 2019
19:00 (D/N)
Scorecard

Essex Eagles (H); 133 (16.4 overs)	v	Hampshire; 134/3 (15.4 overs)
Tom Westley 44 (29); Mason Crane 3/24 (4 overs)		James Vince 87* (54); Simon Harmer 2/31 (3.4 overs)

Hampshire won by 7 wickets
County Ground, Chelmsford
Umpires: Jeremy Lloyds and Russell Warren
Player of the match: James Vince (Hampshire)

- Hampshire won the toss and elected to field.
- Points: Hampshire 2, Essex Eagles 0.

1 August 2019
19:00 (D/N)
Scorecard

Glamorgan (H); 172/5 (20 overs)	v	Gloucestershire; 172/7 (20 overs)
Fakhar Zaman 58 (43); Ryan Higgins 1/29 (3 overs)		Ian Cockbain 40 (33); Andrew Salter 4/12 (3 overs)

Match tied
Sophia Gardens, Cardiff
Umpires: Neil Mallender and Jeff Evans
Player of the match: Andrew Tye (Gloucestershire)

- Gloucestershire won the toss and elected to field.
- Points: Glamorgan 1, Gloucestershire 1.

2 August 2019
18:30 (D/N)
Scorecard

Surrey; 203/4 (20 overs)	v	Somerset (H); 207/2 (18.4 overs)
Aaron Finch 72 (44); Max Waller 2/34 (4 overs)		Tom Banton 71 (37); Imran Tahir 1/31 (4 overs)

Somerset won by 8 wickets
County Ground, Taunton
Umpires: Mark Newell and Martin Saggers
Player of the match: Eddie Byrom (Somerset)

- Somerset won the toss and elected to field first.
- Eddie Byrom (Somerset) made his T20 debut.
- Points: Somerset 2, Surrey 0.

2 August 2019
18:30 (D/N)
Scorecard

Essex Eagles; 206/3 (20 overs)	v	Gloucestershire (H); 181/5 (20 overs)
Tom Westley 86* (54); Benny Howell 2/13 (4 overs)		Ryan Higgins 77* (43); Adam Zampa 2/31 (4 overs)

Essex Eagles won by 25 runs
County Ground, Bristol
Umpires: Richard Illingworth and Paul Baldwin
Player of the match: Tom Westley (Essex Eagles)

- Essex Eagles won the toss and elected to bat.
- Aaron Beard (Essex Eagles) made his T20 debut.
- Points: Essex Eagles 2, Gloucestershire 0.

2 August 2019
19:00 (D/N)
Scorecard

Kent Spitfires; 154/8 (20 overs)	v	Sussex Sharks (H); 158/1 (16 overs)
Daniel Bell-Drummond 50 (36); Tymal Mills 3/23 (4 overs)		Laurie Evans 65* (35); Adam Milne 1/27 (3 overs)

Sussex Sharks won by 9 wickets
County Ground, Hove
Umpires: Steve O'Shaughnessy and Russell Warren
Player of the match: Laurie Evans (Sussex Sharks)

- Sussex Sharks won the toss an elected to field.
- Points: Sussex Sharks 2, Kent Spitfires 0.

2 August 2019
19:00 (D/N)
Scorecard

Hampshire (H); 128/7 (20 overs)	v	Glamorgan; 87 (15.3 overs)
James Vince 25 (21); Marchant de Lange 2/24 (4 overs)		David Lloyd 26 (29); Liam Dawson 3/11 (3.3 overs)

Hampshire won by 41 runs
Rose Bowl, Southampton
Umpires: Ben Debenham and Mike Burns
Player of the match: Liam Dawson (Hampshire)

- Hampshire won the toss and elected to bat.
- Points: Hampshire 2, Glamorgan 0.

4 August 2019
14:30
Scorecard

Middlesex (H); 215/4 (20 overs)	v	Somerset; 180 (17.2 overs)
AB de Villiers 88* (35); Tom Lammonby 2/32 (3 overs)		Tom Abell 41 (23); Nathan Sowter 4/29 (4 overs)

Middlesex won by 35 runs
Old Deer Park, Richmond
Umpires: Richard Illingworth and Alex Wharf
Player of the match: AB de Villiers (Middlesex)

- Somerset won the toss and elected to field.
- Points: Middlesex 2, Somerset 0.

4 August 2019
14:30
Scorecard

Gloucestershire (H); 159/6 (20 overs)	v	Sussex Sharks; 163/7 (19.4 overs)
Ian Cockbain 61* (49); Ollie Robinson 2/34 (4 overs)		David Wiese 37 (29); David Payne 3/35 (4 overs)

Sussex Sharks won by 3 wickets
County Ground, Bristol
Umpires: Ian Gould and Mike Burns
Player of the match: Delray Rawlins (Sussex Sharks)

- Sussex Sharks won the toss and elected to field.
- Sussex Sharks awarded 6 penalty runs due to Gloucestershire's slow over-rate.
- Points: Sussex Sharks 2, Gloucestershire 0.

4 August 2019
15:00
Scorecard

Hampshire; 135 (19.2 overs)	v	Kent Spitfires (H); 138/6 (19.5 overs)
James Vince 44 (47); Adam Milne 3/21 (4 overs)		Heino Kuhn 41 (33); Kyle Abbott 3/31 (3.5 overs)

Kent Spitfires won by 4 wickets
Kent County Cricket Ground, Beckenham
Umpires: Neil Bainton and Paul Baldwin
Player of the match: Adam Milne (Kent Spitfires)

- Kent Spitfires won the toss and elected to field.
- Points: Kent Spitfires 2, Hampshire 0.

6 August 2019
19:00 (D/N)
Scorecard

Glamorgan; 146/9 (20 overs)	v	Sussex Sharks (H); 150/1 (13.5 overs)
David Lloyd 50 (37); Reece Topley 3/20 (4 overs)		Phil Salt 78* (42); Michael Hogan 1/48 (3.5 overs)

Sussex Sharks won by 9 wickets
County Ground, Hove
Umpires: Ian Gould and Rob Bailey
Player of the match: Phil Salt (Sussex Sharks)

- Glamorgan won the toss and elected to bat.
- Points: Sussex Sharks 2, Glamorgan 0.

7 August 2019
18:30 (D/N)
Scorecard

Kent Spitfires; 125/8 (20 overs)	v	Gloucestershire (H); 131/5 (18.5 overs)
Daniel Bell-Drummond 62 (56); Chris Liddle 2/23 (4 overs)		Benny Howell 25* (14); Fred Klaassen 2/24 (3.5 overs)

Gloucestershire won by 5 wickets
County Ground, Bristol
Umpires: Tom Robinson and Alex Wharf
Player of the match: Benny Howell (Gloucestershire)

- Gloucestershire won the toss and elected to field.
- Points: Gloucestershire 2, Kent Spitfires 0.

7 August 2019
19:00 (D/N)
Scorecard

Somerset; 225/6 (20 overs)	v	Essex Eagles (H); 111 (12.5 overs)
Babar Azam 56 (39); Ravi Bopara 3/18 (4 overs)		Dan Lawrence 24 (12); Roelof van der Merwe 5/32 (3 overs)

Somerset won by 114 runs
County Ground, Chelmsford
Umpires: Graham Lloyd and Neil Bainton
Player of the match: Roelof van der Merwe (Somerset)

- Somerset won the toss and elected to bat.
- Points: Somerset 2, Essex Eagles 0.

8 August 2019
18:15 (D/N)
Scorecard

Middlesex (H); 210/8 (20 overs)	v	Surrey; 146 (18.4 overs)
Eoin Morgan 70 (37); Tom Curran 3/36 (4 overs)		Aaron Finch 47 (25); Steven Finn 5/16 (4 overs)

Middlesex won by 64 runs
Lord's, London
Umpires: Peter Hartley and Jeff Evans
Player of the match: Steven Finn (Middlesex)

- Surrey won the toss and elected to field.
- Points: Middlesex 2, Surrey 0.

9 August 2019
18:30 (D/N)
Scorecard

Essex Eagles; 30/1 (4 overs)	v	Glamorgan (H)
Cameron Delport 20 (19); Graham Wagg 1/6 (1 over)

No result
Sophia Gardens, Cardiff
Umpires: James Middlebrook and Alex Wharf

- Glamorgan won the toss and elected to field.
- Match reduced to 11 overs per side due to rain.
- Callum Taylor (Glamorgan) made his T20 debut.
- Points: Glamorgan 1, Essex Eagles 1.

9 August 2019
18:30 (D/N)
Scorecard

Gloucestershire; 165/8 (20 overs)	v	Surrey (H); 94/2 (12 overs)
Ian Cockbain 40 (28); Sam Curran 2/23 (3 overs)		Sam Curran 51* (35); Tom Smith 1/6 (1 over)

Gloucestershire won by 9 runs (D/L/S method)
The Oval, London
Umpires: Billy Taylor and Steve O'Shaughnessy
Player of the match: David Payne (Gloucestershire)

- Gloucestershire won the toss and elected to bat.
- Points: Gloucestershire 2, Surrey 0.

9 August 2019
19:00 (D/N)
Scorecard

Somerset; 202/4 (20 overs)	v	Hampshire (H); 69/6 (12.1 overs)
Babar Azam 102* (55); Kyle Abbott 2/41 (4 overs)		Sam Northeast 16 (21); Jerome Taylor 2/12 (2.1 overs)

Somerset won by 63 runs (D/L/S method)
Rose Bowl, Southampton
Umpires: Peter Hartley and Paul Baldwin
Player of the match: Babar Azam (Somerset)

- Hampshire won the toss and elected to field.
- Points: Somerset 2, Hampshire 0.

9 August 2019
19:00 (D/N)
Scorecard

Middlesex; 127/6 (20 overs)	v	Sussex Sharks (H); 130/6 (16.2 overs)
Stephen Eskinazi 57* (48); Ollie Robinson 4/15 (4 overs)		Alex Carey 32 (26); Nathan Sowter 3/20 (4 overs)

Sussex Sharks won by 4 wickets
County Ground, Hove
Umpires: Chris Watts and Nick Cook
Player of the match: Ollie Robinson (Sussex Sharks)

- Sussex Sharks won the toss and elected to field.
- Points: Sussex Sharks 2, Middlesex 0.

10 August 2019
19:00 (D/N)
Scorecard

Somerset (H); 206/8 (20 overs)	v	Kent Spitfires; 151 (18.4 overs)
Tom Banton 100 (52); Daniel Bell-Drummond 2/19 (2 overs)		Daniel Bell-Drummond 36 (26); Craig Overton 3/32 (4 overs)

Somerset won by 55 runs
County Ground, Taunton
Umpires: Neil Bainton and Alex Wharf
Player of the match: Tom Banton (Somerset)

- Somerset won the toss and elected to bat.
- Points: Somerset 2, Kent Spitfires 0.

11 August 2019
14:30
Scorecard

Gloucestershire; 168/8 (20 overs)	v	Middlesex (H); 156/3 (18.1 overs)
Miles Hammond 42 (26); Steven Finn 3/18 (4 overs)		Dawid Malan 91* (59); Chris Liddle 2/32 (4 overs)

Middlesex won by 9 runs (D/L/S method)
Brunton Memorial Ground, Radlett
Umpires: Neil Mallender and David Millns
Player of the match: Dawid Malan (Middlesex)

- Gloucestershire won the toss and elected to bat.
- Points: Middlesex 2, Gloucestershire 0.

11 August 2019
14:30
Scorecard

Glamorgan (H); 152/6 (20 overs)	v	Surrey; 155/3 (19 overs)
Colin Ingram 41 (33); Tom Curran 2/30 (4 overs)		Mark Stoneman 53 (49); Ruaidhri Smith 3/21 (4 overs)

Surrey won by 7 wickets
Sophia Gardens, Cardiff
Umpires: Nick Cook and Paul Baldwin
Player of the match: Mark Stoneman (Surrey)

- Surrey won the toss and elected to field.
- Points: Surrey 2, Glamorgan 0.

13 August 2019
18:30 (D/N)
Scorecard

Hampshire; 139/6 (20 overs)	v	Gloucestershire (H); 144/3 (17.5 overs)
Aneurin Donald 44 (23); Chris Liddle 3/25 (4 overs)		James Bracey 64 (48); Chris Morris 2/27 (4 overs)

Gloucestershire won by 7 wickets
County Ground, Bristol
Umpires: Mike Burns and David Millns
Player of the match: James Bracey (Gloucestershire)

- Hampshire won the toss and elected to bat.
- Points: Gloucestershire 2, Hampshire 0.

14 August 2019
19:00 (D/N)
Scorecard

Essex Eagles	v	Middlesex

Match abandoned without a ball bowled
County Ground, Chelmsford
Umpires: Tim Robinson and Neil Bainton

- No toss.
- Points: Essex Eagles 1, Middlesex 1.

14 August 2019
19:00 (D/N)
Scorecard

Kent Spitfires	v	Glamorgan

Match abandoned without a ball bowled
St Lawrence Ground, Canterbury
Umpires: Ben Debenham and Jeremy Lloyds

- No toss.
- Points: Kent Spitfires 1, Glamorgan 1.

15 August 2019
18:30 (D/N)
Scorecard

Surrey (H); 163/8 (20 overs)	v	Sussex Sharks; 137/8 (20 overs)
Ollie Pope 48 (44); Will Beer 3/22 (4 overs)		Laurie Evans 34 (35); Tom Curran 3/20 (3.3 overs)

Surrey won by 26 runs
The Oval, London
Umpires: Ian Blackwell and Rob Bailey

- Sussex Sharks won the toss and elected to field.
- Points: Surrey 2, Sussex Sharks 0.

16 August 2019
18:30 (D/N)
Scorecard

Somerset (H)	v	Gloucestershire

Match abandoned without a ball bowled
County Ground, Taunton
Umpires: Jeff Evans and Jeremy Lloyds

- No toss.
- Points: Somerset 1, Gloucestershire 1.

16 August 2019
19:00 (D/N)
Scorecard

Kent Spitfires (H)	v	Sussex Sharks

Match abandoned without a ball bowled
St Lawrence Ground, Canterbury
Umpires: Tim Robinson and Neil Bainton

- No toss.
- Points: Kent Spitfires 1, Sussex Sharks 1.

16 August 2019
19:00 (D/N)
Scorecard

Hampshire (H)	v	Surrey

Match abandoned without a ball bowled
Rose Bowl, Southampton
Umpires: Ian Gould and Russell Warren

- No toss.
- Points: Hampshire 1, Surrey 1.

16 August 2019
19:00 (D/N)
Scorecard

Essex Eagles (H)	v	Glamorgan

Match abandoned without a ball bowled
County Ground, Chelmsford
Umpires: Ian Blackwell and Rob Bailey

- No toss.
- Points: Essex Eagles 1, Glamorgan 1.

22 August 2019
18:15 (D/N)
Scorecard

Middlesex (H); 128 (20 overs)	v	Hampshire; 131/3 (14.5 overs)
Mohammad Hafeez 34 (34); Chris Morris 3/22 (4 overs)		James Vince 69 (42); Toby Roland-Jones 1/20 (3 overs)

Hampshire won by 7 wickets
Lord's, London
Umpires: Neil Mallender and Neil Bainton
Player of the match: James Vince (Hampshire)

- Hampshire won the toss and elected to field.
- Points: Hampshire 2, Middlesex 0.

22 August 2019
19:00 (D/N)
Scorecard

Essex Eagles; 168/5 (20 overs)	v	Sussex Sharks (H); 159/9 (20 overs)
Dan Lawrence 59* (43); Will Beer 2/19 (4 overs)		David Wiese 66 (37); Mohammad Amir 4/29 (4 overs)

Essex Eagles won by 9 runs
County Ground, Hove
Umpires: Alex Wharf and Rob Bailey
Player of the match: Dan Lawrence (Essex Eagles)

- Sussex Sharks won the toss and elected to field.
- Points: Essex Eagles 2, Sussex Sharks 0.

23 August 2019
18:30 (D/N)
Scorecard

Gloucestershire (H); 189/4 (20 overs)	v	Somerset; 164 (19.3 overs)
Michael Klinger 74 (52); Tim Groenewald 2/33 (4 overs)		Babar Azam 44 (29); Tom Smith 3/19 (4 overs)

Gloucestershire won by 25 runs
County Ground, Bristol
Umpires: Peter Hartley and Ian Blackwell
Player of the match: Tom Smith (Gloucestershire)

- Somerset won the toss and elected to field.
- Points: Gloucestershire 2, Somerset 0.

23 August 2019
19:00 (D/N)
Scorecard

Surrey; 171/7 (20 overs)	v	Kent Spitfires (H); 170/3 (20 overs)
Will Jacks 63 (27); Imran Qayyum 3/22 (4 overs)		Daniel Bell-Drummond 64 (49); Jade Dernbach 2/27 (4 overs)

Surrey won by 1 run
St Lawrence Ground, Canterbury
Umpires: Paul Pollard and Nigel Llong
Player of the match: Will Jacks (Surrey)

- Surrey won the toss and elected to bat.
- Marcus O'Riordan and Matt Milnes (both Kent Spitfires) made their T20 debuts.
- Points: Surrey 2, Kent Spitfires 0.

24 August 2019
14:30
Scorecard

Middlesex (H); 171/5 (20 overs)	v	Sussex Sharks; 172/2 (16 overs)
Mohammad Hafeez 48 (37); Will Beer 1/28 (3 overs)		Laurie Evans 52* (25); Paul Stirling 1/11 (1 over)

Sussex Sharks won by 8 wickets
Uxbridge Cricket Club Ground, Uxbridge
Umpires: Nigel Llong and Alex Wharf
Player of the match: Laurie Evans (Sussex Sharks)

- Middlesex won the toss and elected to bat.
- Points: Sussex Sharks 2, Middlesex 0.

24 August 2019
19:00 (D/N)
Scorecard

Somerset (H); 177/8 (20 overs)	v	Glamorgan; 152 (20 overs)
Babar Azam 63 (42); Marchant de Lange 3/36 (4 overs)		David Lloyd 63 (37); Max Waller 3/19 (4 overs)

Somerset won by 25 runs
County Ground, Taunton
Umpires: Neil Mallender and David Millns
Player of the match: Babar Azam (Somerset)

- Glamorgan won the toss and elected to field.
- Roman Walker (Glamorgan) made his T20 debut.
- This match was played on an experimental hybrid pitch.
- Points: Somerset 2, Glamorgan 0.

25 August 2019
14:30
Scorecard

Essex Eagles; 139/7 (20 overs)	v	Hampshire (H); 139/6 (20 overs)
Dan Lawrence 69 (47); Kyle Abbott 3/15 (4 overs)		Sam Northeast 73 (56); Simon Harmer 2/23 (4 overs)

Match tied
Rose Bowl, Southampton
Umpires: Billy Taylor and Ian Gould
Player of the match: Dan Lawrence (Essex Eagles)

- Hampshire won the toss and elected to field.
- Points: Hampshire 1, Essex Eagles 1.

26 August 2019
14:30
Scorecard

Glamorgan (H); 174/4 (20 overs)	v	Sussex Sharks; 176/3 (16.5 overs)
Shaun Marsh 52 (50); Chris Jordan 2/35 (4 overs)		Alex Carey 61 (30); Andrew Salter 3/37 (4 overs)

Sussex Sharks won by 7 wickets
Sophia Gardens, Cardiff
Umpires: Neil Mallender and Mike Burns
Player of the match: Alex Carey (Sussex Sharks)

- Glamorgan won the toss and elected to bat.
- Prem Sisodiya (Glamorgan) made his T20 debut.
- Points: Sussex Sharks 2, Glamorgan 0.

27 August 2019
18:30 (D/N)
Scorecard

Somerset (H); 157/9 (20 overs)	v	Surrey; 158/4 (16.3 overs)
Tom Banton 47 (28); Imran Tahir 4/25 (4 overs)		Aaron Finch 102* (53); Roelof van der Merwe 2/34 (4 overs)

Surrey won by 6 wickets
The Oval, London
Umpires: Billy Taylor and Nigel Llong
Player of the match: Aaron Finch (Surrey)

- Somerset won the toss and elected to bat.
- Points: Surrey 2, Somerset 0.

29 August 2019
18:30 (D/N)
Scorecard

Essex Eagles; 186/4 (20 overs)	v	Surrey (H); 167 (19.5 overs)
Ravi Bopara 70* (35); Gareth Batty 1/15 (4 overs)		Jordan Clark 60 (32); Jamie Porter 4/38 (3.5 overs)

Essex Eagles won by 19 runs
The Oval, London
Umpires: Paul Pollard and Ian Gould
Player of the match: Ravi Bopara (Essex Eagles)

- Essex Eagles won the toss and elected to bat.
- Points: Essex Eagles 2, Surrey 0.

29 August 2019
18:30 (D/N)
Scorecard

Middlesex; 153/5 (20 overs)	v	Hampshire (H); 155/2 (18.3 overs)
AB de Villiers 52* (34); Mason Crane 2/22 (4 overs)		James Vince 66* (55); Paul Stirling 1/6 (1 over)

Hampshire won by 8 wickets
Rose Bowl, Southampton
Umpires: Nigel Llong and Steve O'Shaughnessy
Player of the match: James Vince (Hampshire)

- Middlesex won the toss and elected to bat.
- Point: Hampshire 2, Middlesex 0.

29 August 2019
19:00 (D/N)
Scorecard

Gloucestershire; 180/3 (20 overs)	v	Kent Spitfires (H); 175/8 (20 overs)
Michael Klinger 102* (65); Alex Blake 1/17 (4 overs)		Faf du Plessis 60 (45); Ryan Higgins 3/36 (4 overs)

Gloucestershire won by 5 runs
St Lawrence Ground, Canterbury
Umpires: Mike Burns and David Millns
Player of the match: Michael Klinger (Gloucestershire)

- Kent Spitfires won the toss and elected to field.
- Points: Gloucestershire 2, Kent Spitfires 0.

30 August 2019
18:30 (D/N)
Scorecard

Glamorgan (H); 216/5 (20 overs)	v	Hampshire; 188/8 (20 overs)
Chris Cooke 45 (23); Chris Wood 2/67 (4 overs)		Sam Northeast 60 (41); Roman Walker 3/39 (4 overs)

Glamorgan won by 28 runs
Sophia Gardens, Cardiff
Umpires: Tom Lungley and Jeremy Lloyds
Player of the match: Chris Cooke (Glamorgan)

- Glamorgan won the toss and elected to bat.
- Points: Glamorgan 2, Hampshire 0.

30 August 2019
18:30 (D/N)
Scorecard

Somerset (H); 226/5 (20 overs)	v	Middlesex; 227/4 (17 overs)
Tom Abell 101* (47); Toby Roland-Jones 2/32 (4 overs)		Eoin Morgan 83* (29); Tim Groenewald 2/38 (3 overs)

Middlesex won by 6 wickets
County Ground, Taunton
Umpires: Alex Wharf and Rob Bailey
Player of the match: Eoin Morgan (Middlesex)

- Somerset won the toss and elected to bat.
- This was a record chase in English T20 cricket.
- Points: Middlesex 2, Somerset 0.

30 August 2019
18:30 (D/N)
Scorecard

Sussex Sharks (H); 163/8 (20 overs)	v	Gloucestershire; 168/7 (20 overs)
Delray Rawlins 69 (41); David Payne 3/36 (4 overs)		Michael Klinger 48 (39); Delray Rawlins 2/19 (4 overs)

Gloucestershire won by 3 wickets
County Ground, Hove
Umpires: Graham Lloyd and Paul Pollard
Player of the match: Delray Rawlins (Sussex Sharks)

- Gloucestershire won the toss and elected to field.
- Points: Gloucestershire 2, Sussex Sharks 0.

30 August 2019
18:30 (D/N)
Scorecard

Essex Eagles (H); 189/6 (20 overs)	v	Kent Spitfires; 179 (20 overs)
Cameron Delport 64 (29); Daniel Bell-Drummond 2/25 (3 overs)		Zak Crawley 89 (55); Jamie Porter 3/28 (3 overs)

Essex Eagles won by 10 runs
County Ground, Chelmsford
Umpires: Ian Gould and Paul Baldwin
Player of the match: Ravi Bopara (Essex Eagles)

- Essex Eagles won the toss and elected to bat.
- Points: Essex Eagles 2, Kent Spitfires 0.

== Knock-out stage ==
Quarter-finals
N1	Lancashire Lightning	159/5
S4	Essex Eagles	165/4
S2	Gloucestershire	135/7
N3	Derbyshire Falcons	137/3
N2	Nottinghamshire Outlaws	165/0
S3	Middlesex	160/8
S1	Sussex Sharks	184/6
N4	Worcestershire Rapids	187/2

Semi-finals
S4	Essex Eagles	160/5
N3	Derbyshire Falcons	126
N2	Nottinghamshire Outlaws	146/5
N4	Worcestershire Rapids	147/9

Final
S4	Essex Eagles	148/6
N4	Worcestershire Rapids	145/9

=== Quarter-finals ===
4 September 2019
19:00 (D/N)
Scorecard

Lancashire Lightning (H); 159/5 (20 overs)	v	Essex Eagles; 165/4 (19.2 overs)
Alex Davies 80* (55); Ravi Bopara 2/28 (4 overs)		Ryan ten Doeschate 45* (31); Saqib Mahmood 1/10 (2 overs)

Essex Eagles won by 6 wickets
Riverside Ground, Chester-le-Street
Umpires: Martin Saggers and Mike Burns
Player of the match: Ravi Bopara (Essex Eagles)

- Essex Eagles won the toss and elected to field.
- Essex Eagles advance to Finals Day.

5 September 2019
19:00 (D/N)
Scorecard

Middlesex; 160/8 (20 overs)	v	Nottinghamshire Outlaws (H); 165/0 (16.2 overs)
Eoin Morgan 53 (31); Matthew Carter 2/16 (4 overs)		Alex Hales 83* (47)

Nottinghamshire Outlaws won by 10 wickets
Trent Bridge, Nottingham
Umpires: Peter Hartley and Nick Cook
Player of the match: Chris Nash (Nottinghamshire Outlaws)

- Nottingham Outlaws won the toss and elected to field.
- Nottinghamshire Outlaws advance to Finals Day.

6 September 2019
19:00 (D/N)
Scorecard

Sussex Sharks (H); 184/6 (20 overs)	v	Worcestershire Rapids; 187/2 (17.4 overs)
Phil Salt 72 (40); Ed Barnard 2/21 (4 overs)		Moeen Ali 121* (60); Ollie Robinson 1/24 (2.4 overs)

Worcestershire Rapids won by 8 wickets
County Cricket Ground, Hove
Umpires: Alex Wharf and Russell Warren
Player of the match: Moeen Ali (Worcestershire Rapids)

- Worcestershire Rapids won the toss and elected to field.
- Worcestershire Rapids advance to Finals Day.

7 September 2019
19:00 (D/N)
Scorecard

Gloucestershire (H); 135/7 (20 overs)	v	Derbyshire Falcons; 137/3 (17.1 overs)
Ian Cockbain 45* (34); Matthew Critchley 2/21 (4 overs)		Wayne Madsen 47 (37); Andrew Tye 2/33 (4 overs)

Derbyshire Falcons won by 7 wickets
Bristol County Ground, Bristol
Umpires: David Millns and Steve O'Shaughnessy
Player of the match: Wayne Madsen (Derbyshire Falcons)

- Derbyshire Falcons won the toss and elected to field.
- Derbyshire Falcons advance to Finals Day.

=== Finals Day ===
==== Semi-finals ====
21 September 2019
11:00
Scorecard

Worcestershire Rapids; 147/9 (20 overs)	v	Nottinghamshire Outlaws; 146/5 (20 overs)
Ross Whiteley 36 (24); Matthew Carter 3/32 (4 overs)		Alex Hales 52 (42); Pat Brown 2/21 (4 overs)

Worcestershire Rapids won by 1 run
Edgbaston, Birmingham
Umpires: Rob Bailey and Alex Wharf
Player of the match: Moeen Ali (Worcestershire Rapids)

- Nottinghamshire Outlaws won the toss and elected to field.
- Worcestershire Rapids advance to the final.

21 September 2019
14:30
Scorecard

Essex Eagles; 160/5 (20 overs)	v	Derbyshire Falcons; 126 (18.4 overs)
Cameron Delport 55 (31); Luis Reece 2/24 (4 overs)		Alex Hughes 23 (27); Simon Harmer 4/19 (4 overs)

Essex Eagles won by 34 runs
Edgbaston, Birmingham
Umpires: Martin Saggers and David Millns
Player of the match: Simon Harmer (Essex Eagles)

- Essex Eagles won the toss and elected to bat.
- Essex Eagles advance to the final.

==== Final ====
21 September 2019
18:45 (D/N)
Scorecard

Worcestershire Rapids; 145/9 (20 overs)	v	Essex Eagles; 148/6 (20 overs)
Moeen Ali 32 (26); Simon Harmer 3/16 (4 overs)		Ravi Bopara 36* (22); Moeen Ali 2/22 (4 overs)

Essex Eagles won by 4 wickets
Edgbaston, Birmingham
Umpires: David Millns and Alex Wharf
Player of the match: Simon Harmer (Essex Eagles)

- Essex Eagles won the toss and elected to field.

== Personnel ==
Team	Coach	Captain	Overseas Player(s)
Birmingham Bears	(England) Jim Troughton	(New Zealand) Jeetan Patel	(New Zealand) Jeetan Patel (Australia) Ashton Agar (Australia) Chris Green
Derbyshire Falcons	(England) Dominic Cork	(England) Billy Godleman	(Netherlands) Logan van Beek (Ireland) Boyd Rankin
Durham	(New Zealand) James Franklin	(Ireland) Stuart Poynter (Australia) Peter Handscomb	(Australia) D'Arcy Short (Australia) Peter Handscomb
Essex Eagles	(England) Anthony McGrath	(South Africa) Simon Harmer	(Australia) Adam Zampa (Pakistan) Mohammad Amir
Glamorgan	(Wales) Matthew Maynard	(South Africa) Colin Ingram	(Pakistan) Fakhar Zaman (Australia) Shaun Marsh
Gloucestershire	(England) Richard Dawson	(Australia) Michael Klinger	(Australia) Michael Klinger (Australia) Andrew Tye
Hampshire	(South Africa) Adrian Birrell	(England) James Vince	(South Africa) Chris Morris (South Africa) Tabraiz Shamsi
Kent Spitfires	(England) Matt Walker	(England) Daniel Bell-Drummond (England) Sam Billings	(New Zealand) Adam Milne (Afghanistan) Mohammad Nabi (South Africa) Faf du Plessis
Lancashire Lightning	(England) Glen Chapple	(South Africa) Dane Vilas	(Australia) Glenn Maxwell (Australia) James Faulkner
Leicestershire Foxes	(England) Paul Nixon	(South Africa) Colin Ackermann	None
Middlesex	(Australia) Stuart Law	(England) Dawid Malan	(Afghanistan) Mujeeb Ur Rahman (South Africa) AB de Villiers (Pakistan) Mohammad Hafeez
Northamptonshire Steelbacks	(England) David Ripley	(England) Josh Cobb	(Pakistan) Faheem Ashraf (South Africa) Dwaine Pretorius
Nottinghamshire Outlaws	(England) Peter Moores	(Australia) Dan Christian	(Australia) Dan Christian (Pakistan) Imad Wasim
Somerset	(England) Jason Kerr	(England) Lewis Gregory (England) Tom Abell	(Cricket West Indies) Jerome Taylor (Pakistan) Babar Azam
Surrey	(Australia) Michael Di Venuto	(England) Jade Dernbach (Australia) Aaron Finch	(Australia) Aaron Finch (South Africa) Imran Tahir
Sussex Sharks	(Australia) Jason Gillespie	(England) Luke Wright	(Australia) Alex Carey (Afghanistan) Rashid Khan (Australia) Jason Behrendorff
Worcestershire Rapids	(England) Alex Gidman	(England) Moeen Ali (Australia) Callum Ferguson	(New Zealand) Martin Guptill (Australia) Callum Ferguson (New Zealand) Hamish Rutherford
Yorkshire Vikings	(England) Andrew Gale	(England) Tom Kohler-Cadmore	(Cricket West Indies) Nicholas Pooran (South Africa) Keshav Maharaj

== Statistics ==
=== North Group ===
As of 31 August 2019

- Highest score by a team: Yorkshire Vikings − 255/2 (20 overs) vs. Leicestershire Foxes (23 July)
- Top score by an individual: Tom Kohler-Cadmore (Yorkshire Vikings) − 96* (54) vs Leicestershire Foxes (23 July)
- Best bowling figures by an individual: Colin Ackermann (Leicestershire Foxes) − 7/18 (4 overs) vs Birmingham Bears (7 August)

==== Most runs ====
Player	Team	Matches	Innings	Runs	Average	HS	100s	50s
D'Arcy Short	Durham	12	12	483	43.90	77*	0	4
Sam Hain	Birmingham Bears	12	12	459	41.72	85	0	3
Tom Kohler-Cadmore	Yorkshire Vikings	10	10	435	62.14	96*	0	5
Billy Godleman	Derbyshire Falcons	12	12	419	46.55	92	0	4
Wayne Madsen	Derbyshire Falcons	12	12	400	50.00	69	0	4

Source: ESPNcricinfo

==== Most wickets ====
Players	Team	Matches	Overs	Wickets	Average	BBI	4w	5w
Matt Parkinson	Lancashire Lightning	11	37.4	21	13.38	4/30	1	0
Ravi Rampaul	Derbyshire Falcons	12	46.0	21	14.71	3/17	0	0
Harry Gurney	Nottinghamshire Outlaws	10	36.0	18	18.05	5/30	0	1
Matthew Potts	Durham	12	39.5	17	19.52	3/22	0	0
Nathan Rimmington	Durham	12	43.5	16	19.06	3/15	0	0

Source: ESPNcricinfo

=== South Group ===
As of 31 August 2019

- Highest score by a team: Middlesex − 227/4 (17 overs) vs Somerset (30 August)
- Top score by an individual: Cameron Delport (Essex Eagles) − 129 (49) vs Surrey (19 July)
- Best bowling figures by an individual: Steven Finn (Middlesex) − 5/16 (4 overs) vs Surrey (8 August)

==== Most runs ====
Player	Team	Matches	Innings	Runs	Average	HS	100s	50s
Babar Azam	Somerset	13	13	578	52.54	102*	1	4
Tom Banton	Somerset	13	13	549	42.23	100	1	4
Dawid Malan	Middlesex	13	13	488	44.36	117	1	2
James Vince	Hampshire	13	12	407	40.70	87*	0	4
Aaron Finch	Surrey	13	13	398	36.18	102*	1	1

Source: ESPNcricinfo

==== Most wickets ====
Players	Team	Matches	Overs	Wickets	Average	BBI	4w	5w
Kyle Abbott	Hampshire	13	43.3	20	17.80	3/15	0	0
Toby Roland-Jones	Middlesex	13	41.1	19	18.57	5/21	1	1
Imran Tahir	Surrey	13	47.0	19	20.26	4/25	1	0
Steven Finn	Middlesex	13	46.0	19	22.36	5/16	0	1
Hardus Viljoen	Kent Spitfires	12	45.2	18	19.72	3/15	0	0

Source: ESPNcricinfo
