= Liversedge =

Town in West Yorkshire, England

Coordinates: 53.706667°N 1.69°W

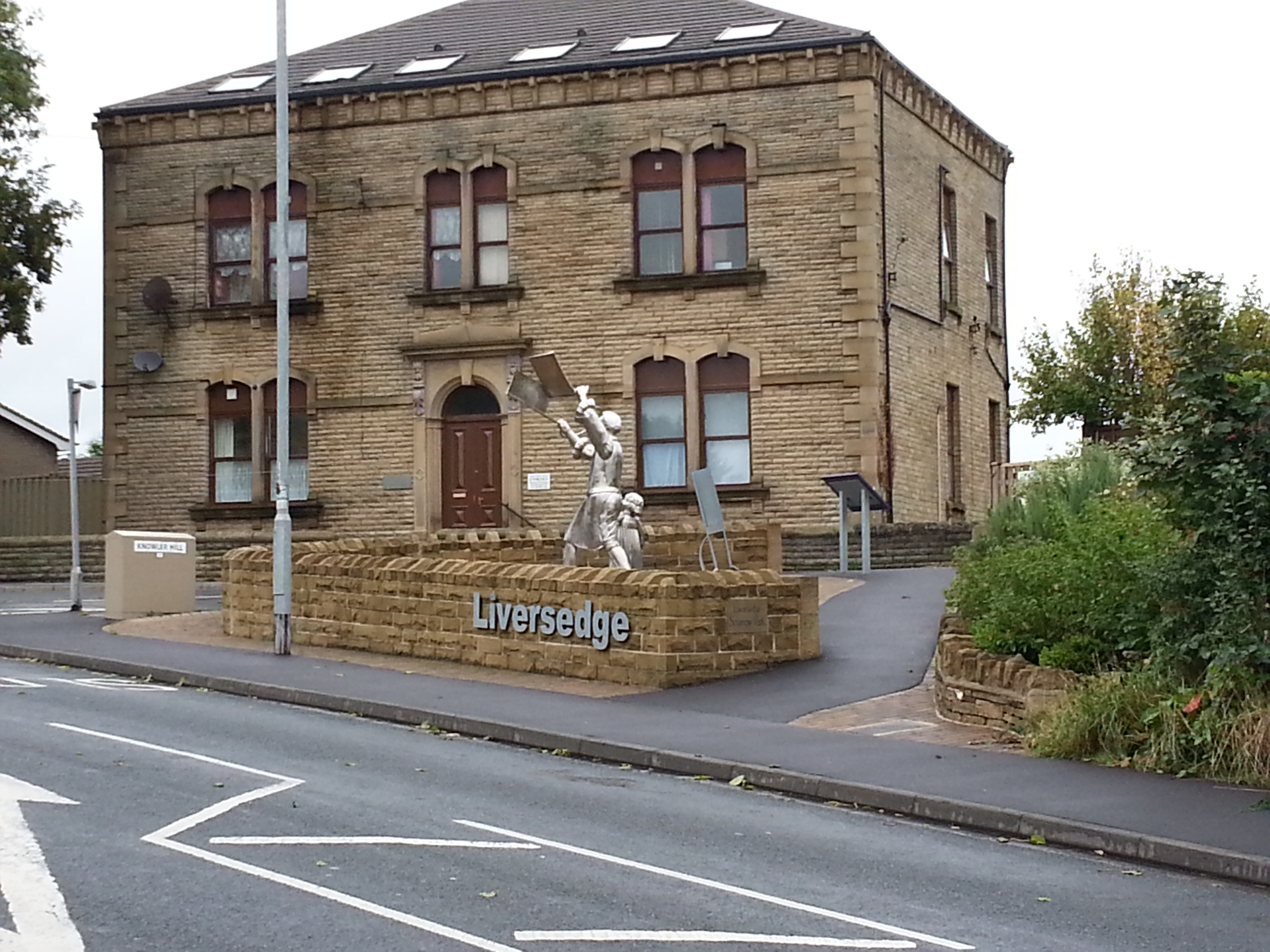
- Sparrow Park and the Liversedge Town Hall

- Location within West Yorkshire
- Population: 19,420 (Ward. Liversedge and Gomersal)
- OS grid reference: SE186240
- Metropolitan borough: Kirklees
- Metropolitan county: West Yorkshire
- Region: Yorkshire and the Humber
- Country: England
- Sovereign state: United Kingdom
- Areas of the town: List: Hartshead; Hightown; Littletown; Norristhorpe; Roberttown
- Post town: LIVERSEDGE
- Postcode district: WF15
- Dialling code: 01274; 01924
- Police: West Yorkshire
- Fire: West Yorkshire
- Ambulance: Yorkshire
- UK Parliament: Spen Valley

Liversedge is an industrial town in the Kirklees district, in West Yorkshire, England. Historically part of the West Riding of Yorkshire, Liversedge lies between Cleckheaton and Heckmondwike. The Kirklees ward is now called Liversedge and Gomersal with a population at the 2011 Census of 19,420. Liversedge forms part of the Heavy Woollen District and was historically part of the parish of Birstall. Spen Beck runs through Liversedge.

== Settlements ==
Liversedge comprises several settlements that are all distinctive. Norristhorpe clings to one side of the Spen Valley, looking over the town of Heckmondwike. Roberttown is on the opposite side of the A62. Millbridge is the geographical centre of Liversedge and, with the neighbouring village of Flush, is the place the mills of the woollen industry stood. Towards Cleckheaton are Hightown, Littletown and Popeley Hill.

Liversedge has a Wakefield postcode (WF15). Some areas have a Wakefield dialling code (01924) while others have a Bradford dialling code (01274).

== History ==
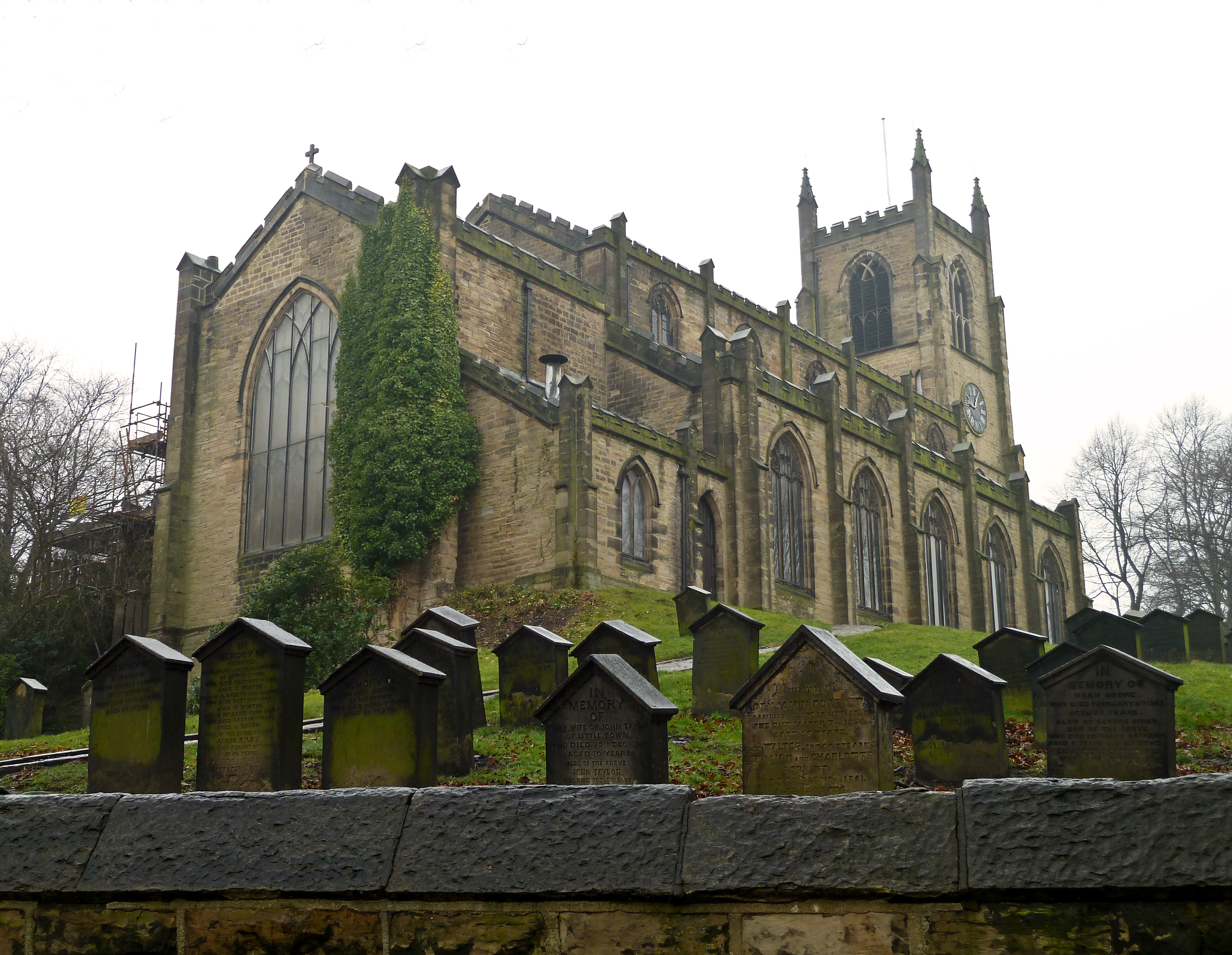
Christ Church, Liversedge

Liversedge is recorded in the Domesday Book as Livresec, a manor belonging to Radulf, a vassal of Ilbert de Lacy. There are two possible etymologies for the name: from the Old English Lēofheres-ecg meaning 'a ridge or edge belonging to Lēofhere'; or, alternatively, the first element could have originally been *Lēfer-, related to the Old English word lifer used in the sense of 'thick clotted water', and the second element secg, 'a bed of reeds or rushes'.

In the 15th century, the lord of the manor was a member of the Neville family and Liversedge was already involved in woollen manufacture. The trade grew and by the 19th century the town was busy in the manufacture of woollen goods. In 1812, the town was the scene of a Luddite attack on Rawfolds Mill, when approximately two hundred armed weavers, croppers and other artisans attempted to destroy cropping frames at a mill operated by William Cartwright. Two Luddites were killed and some were injured by four soldiers and armed workmen defending the mill, with no losses on Cartwright's side. Liversedge Town Hall at the top of Knowler Hill was built for Liversedge Local Board and completed in around 1880.

In 2012, Sparrow Park was constructed outside Liversedge Town Hall in commemoration of the 200th anniversary of the uprising and attack on Rawfolds Mill, which began just up the road from the monument in the still-operational "Shears" pub.

Healds Hall, formerly the Spenborough Museum, is now a hotel. In the days of Charlotte Brontë it was home to Hammond Roberson whom she transformed into the Reverend Matthewman Helstone in her novel Shirley.

== Governance ==
Politically, for Kirklees Council, the Leeds/Huddersfield Road acts as a boundary between electoral wards. Roberttown, Hightown and Littletown are within the Liversedge and Gomersal ward, while Norristhorpe and Flush are part of the Heckmondwike ward.

Liversedge was formerly a township and chapelry in the parish of Birstal, and in 1866 Liversedge became a separate civil parish. In 1894 Liversedge became an urban district, but on 1 April 1915 the district was abolished to form Spenborough Urban District. In 1951 the parish had a population of 15,590. On 1 April 1974 the parish was abolished.

== Religion ==
Liversedge has a parish church which was built at the time of the Battle of Waterloo. St. Andrew's Methodist Church is part of the North Kirklees and Morley Circuit.

== Sport ==
=== Football ===
Liversedge F.C. are a football club in the football league pyramid, playing in the Northern Counties East Football League Premier Division for the 2017–18 season. They play at Clayborn, 0.6 miles (1 km) from Cleckheaton town centre.

There are also many Sunday League football teams in and around Liversedge playing in the Heavy Woollen Sunday League.

=== Cricket ===
Liversedge Cricket Club play at Roberttown Lane near to the New Inn and play in the Central Yorkshire League.

=== Rugby league ===
In the late 19th century, and before the 1895 schism, Harry Varley, and Bob Wood played rugby union for England, and Liversedge FC, who were founded in 1877. When the rugby football schism occurred in 1895, Liversedge F.C. became founder members of the Northern Rugby Football Union (now Rugby Football League). Liversedge F.C. played for seven seasons from the 1895–96 season through to the end of 1901–02 season, they finished 15th of 22 in the initial combined league, and then 11th, 16th, 15th, 16th, and 16th of 16, and finally 14th of 14, in the Yorkshire Senior Competition, after which they withdrew from the Northern Rugby Football Union. Rugby league in the town is now represented by Liversedge ARLFC, who play behind Spenborough Swimming Pool off Bradford Road and currently play in the Third Division of the Pennine Amateur Rugby League pyramid.

== Notable people ==
- Ken Mackintosh (1919–2005), bandleader; accompanied the likes of Tom Jones and Shirley Bassey on stage.
- John Fozard (1928–96), aeronautical engineer who helped design the Hawker Siddeley Harrier.
- Norman Field (born 1939), English rugby league footballer who played in the 1950s and 1960s.
- Jeff Wooller (born 1940), English accountant
- Angus Pollock (born 1962), cricketer
- Luke Menzies (born 1988), English rugby league player and professional wrestler for WWE as Ridge Holland.
- The Burgess brothers; Sam (born 1988), Luke (born 1987), Tom (born 1992) and George (born 1992); rugby league players

== See also ==
- Listed buildings in Liversedge and Gomersal
