= Littletown, West Yorkshire =

Village in West Yorkshire, England

Coordinates: 53°42.9′N 1°41.8′W

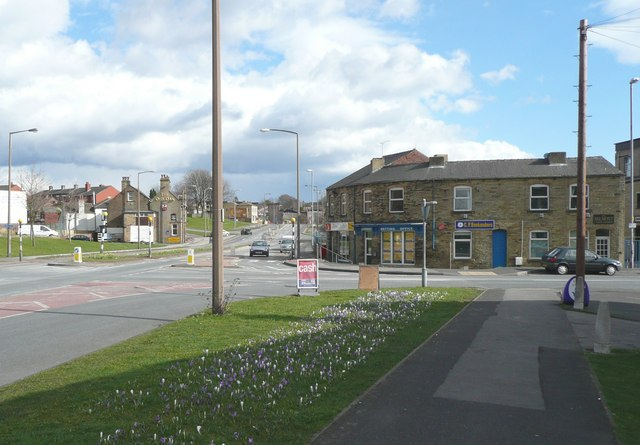
Bradford Road

Littletown is one of the constituent settlements of the district of Liversedge, West Yorkshire, England. Historically part of the West Riding of Yorkshire, much of the town centre was demolished in the 1960s for road widening.

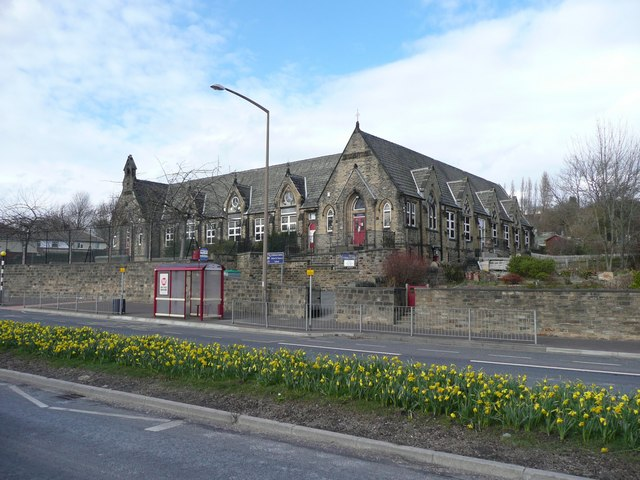
Junior and Infants School

Although local residents always refer to it as a town, its size and population are similar to that of a village. Although it is literally a little town the place name is reputedly named after a Mr Little.

== Education ==
Littletown Junior Infant & Nursery School is in the settlement.

== Church ==
St Andrew's Methodist church is in Littletown.

== Sports ==
Littletown is represented by an amateur football team, Littletown FC, who run a number of teams, the mens first team play in the West Yorkshire Football League. The home ground is Beck Lane, in nearby Heckmondwike
