= Healds Hall =

Listed building in Liversedge, Yorkshire, England

Coordinates: 53.7118°N 1.6862°W

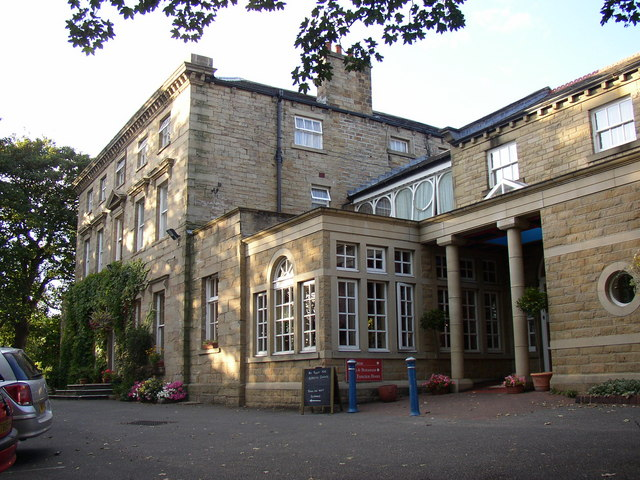
Healds Hall, Liversedge

Healds Hall is a house in Liversedge, Yorkshire, now a hotel. It is listed at Grade II on the English Heritage Register. It was built in 1764 and was a private residence for several notable people. In 1926 it became the headquarters and museum for the Spen Valley Literary and Scientific Society. It is now a hotel, restaurant and function venue.

== Early residents ==
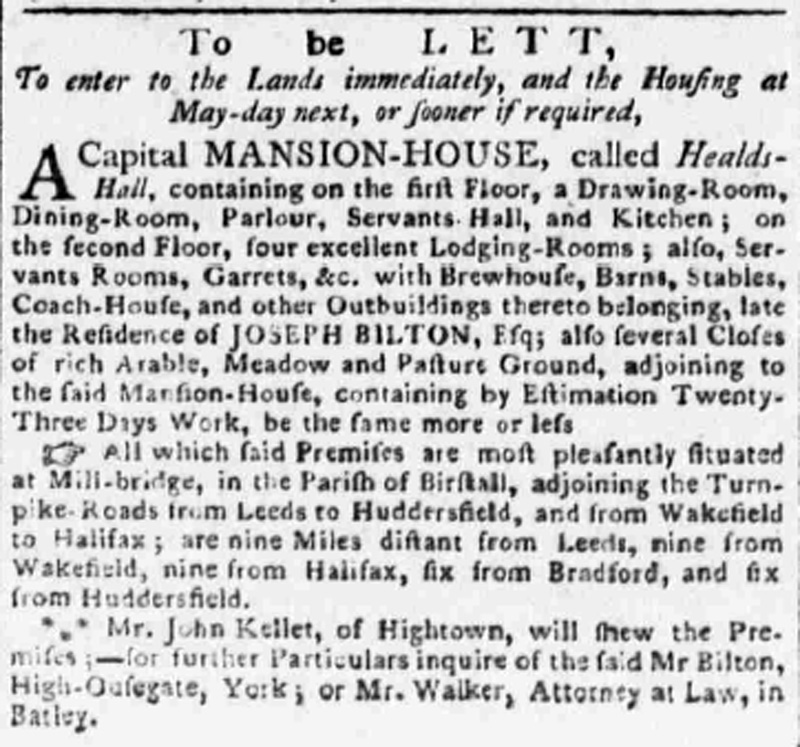
Rental notice for Healds Hall in 1791

Joseph Bilton (1734–1781) who came from a wealthy family in the area built Healds Hall in 1764. In that year he also married at St John the Baptist Church, Halifax in Yorkshire Tamar Wood who was the daughter of William Wood, a merchant. The couple had six children while they were living at the Hall, three sons and three daughters. Joseph died in 1781 and his wife Tamar continued to live at the Hall for some time and later moved to Leeds where she died in 1795. The eldest son was also called Joseph and he was born in 1768. He inherited the house when he came of age. In 1791 he placed a rental notice in the newspaper which describes the house at that time. The notice is shown.

In 1795 Reverend Hammond Roberson bought the property. Hammond Roberson (1757–1841) was born in 1757 in Norfolk. He was educated at Cambridge and later became the curate of Dewsbury. He knew Reverend Patrick Brontë, the father of Charlotte Brontë. Charlotte portrayed him in her novel Shirley as Parson Helstone. His character was described by one writer “as in many ways resembling Patrick Bronte for he was a bold and fearless preacher with a strong personality, a stalwart Tory of the old school, a man of indomitable will and self-sacrificing and generous in his nature.”

In 1786 he married Phoebe Ashworth but the couple appear to have had no children. In 1788 he resigned his curacy in Dewsbury and started a school at Squirril Hall on Dewsbury Moor. He transferred this school to Healds Hall when he bought it. He continued operating the school for many years and in his later years he was assisted by his nephew Henry Roberson (1802–1894) who was a teacher. In 1810 phoebe died and Hammond erected Christ Church in Liversedge in her honour. He paid for the Church from the profits from his school which was extremely successful.

Hammond died in 1841 and left Healds Hall to his nephew Henry Roberson who continued operating the school until 1857. He then sold the Hall and moved the school to The Grange in Tadcaster.

== The Cooke family ==
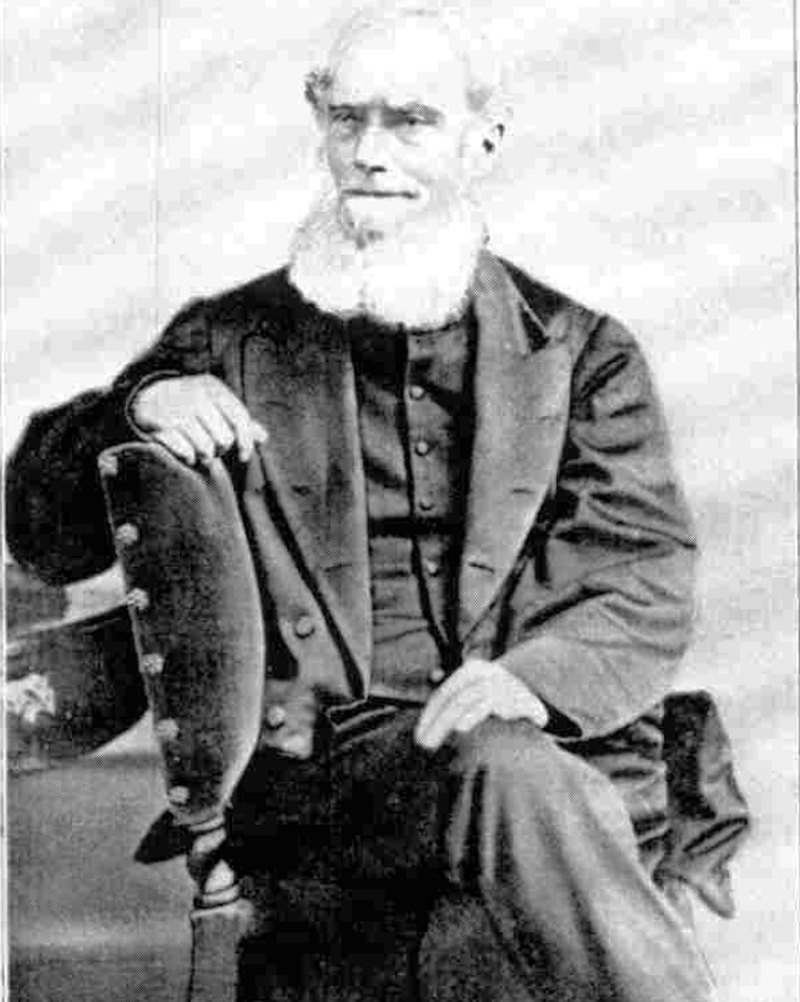
Samuel Cooke (1801–1893)

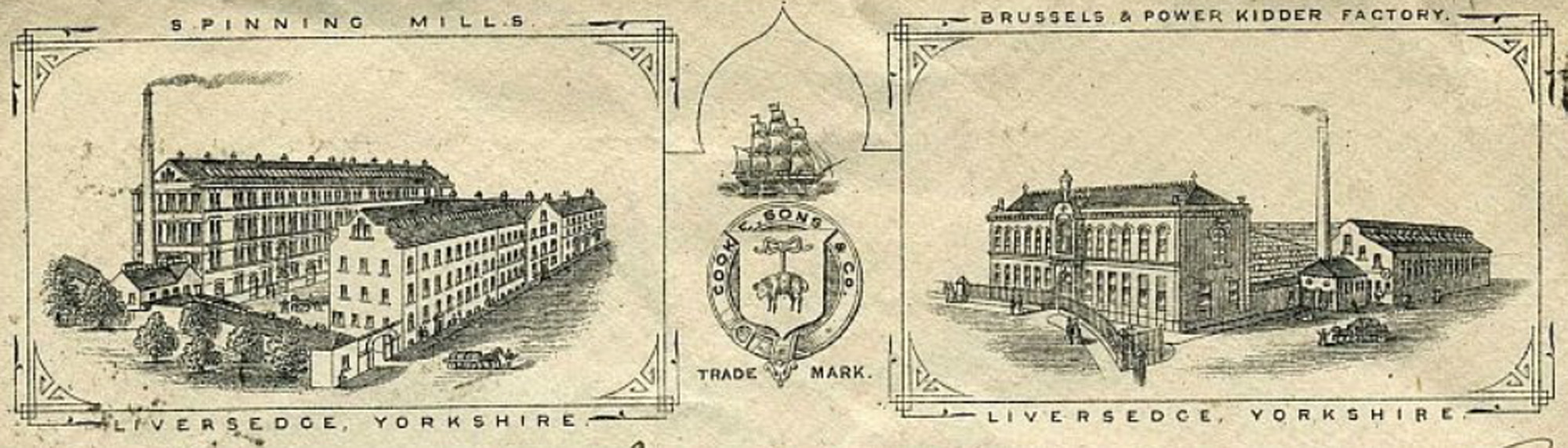
Logo for Cooke, Sons and Co, 1890

Samuel Cooke (1801–1893) bought Healds Hall in 1857. Samuel was born in 1801 in Sheffield in Yorkshire. His father was William Peabody Cooke who in 1795 had established a small carpet and rug making firm in Heckmondwike. He built up a successful business and in 1825 divided the firm to create separate units for the making of “Brussels” and “Kidderminster” carpets. He gave the controlling share of the “Brussels” business to his son, Samuel, who moved the undertaking to an old mill in Millbridge, Liversedge. William continued to make the Kidderminster rugs and carpets in Heckmondwike.

Samuel Cooke named his business Cooke, Son and Co and was so successful that by 1833 – just eight years after starting – he was able to open a six-storey warehouse and sales office. In 1823 Samuel married Rhoda Hinscliffe and the couple had 15 children. They lived for many years in Millbridge and when Samuel bought Healds Hall in 1857 he was 56 years old and most of his children were married and no longer living with them. His sons James and William joined the carpet making business and it prospered further. The logo of the firm in 1890 is shown.

Samuel died in 1893 and Rhoda his wife continued to live at Healds Hall until her death in 1900. After this the property was rented for some time. In 1926 the Cooke family presented the Hall for the use of the Spen Valley Literary and Scientific Society as a museum and headquarters. It served this purpose for the next forty years. It is now a hotel, restaurant and function venue. It has been owned by the Harrington family since 1979. They have extended the original building and added a restaurant and function room as well as hotel bedrooms.
