= Scott Steel =

English cricketer (born 1999)

Personal information
- Born: 20 April 1999 (age 27); Durham, County Durham, England
- Batting: Right-handed
- Bowling: Right-arm off break

Domestic team information
- Years: Team
- 2019–2020: Durham (squad no. 55)
- 2021–2023: Leicestershire (squad no. 55)
- First-class debut: 10 September 2019 Durham v Middlesex
- List A debut: 17 April 2019 Durham v Northamptonshire

Career statistics
Competition	FC	LA	T20
Matches	3	10	41
Runs scored	66	296	909
Batting average	11.00	32.88	25.25
100s/50s	0/0	0/3	0/6
Top score	39	68	72
Balls bowled	82	150	476
Wickets	1	3	17
Bowling average	49.00	48.66	33.41
5 wickets in innings	0	0	0
10 wickets in match	0	0	0
Best bowling	1/20	1/31	3/20
Catches/stumpings	2/–	5/–	4/–
- Source: Cricinfo, 5 October 2022

Scott Steel (born 20 April 1999) is an English cricketer. He made his List A debut on 17 April 2019, for Durham County Cricket Club in the 2019 Royal London One-Day Cup. He made his T20 debut on 19 July 2019, for Durham against Northamptonshire, in the 2019 t20 Blast. He made his first-class debut on 10 September 2019, for Durham in the 2019 County Championship. Steel left Durham at the end of the 2020 season, and joined Leicestershire in October 2020.
