= Alasdair Pollock =

English cricketer (born 1993)

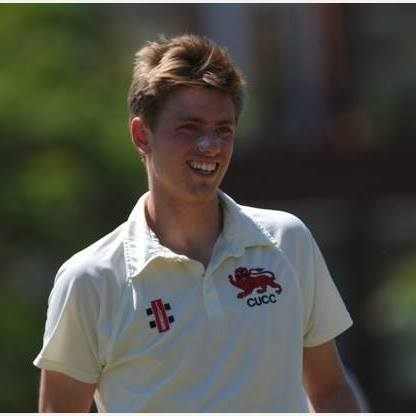
- Pollock at the Varsity cricket match in 2015, Fenner's

Personal information
- Full name: Alasdair William Pollock
- Born: 24 October 1993 (age 33); High Wycombe, Buckinghamshire, England
- Height: 6 ft 0 in (1.83 m)
- Batting: Right-handed
- Bowling: Right-arm medium-fast
- Role: Bowler
- Relatives: Angus Pollock (father); Ed Pollock (brother)

Domestic team information
- Years: Team
- 2013–2015: Cambridge University
- First-class debut: 5 April 2013 Cambridge v Essex
- Last First-class: 30 June 2015 Cambridge v Oxford

Career statistics
Competition	First-class
Matches	8
Runs scored	158
Batting average	15.80
100s/50s	0/0
Top score	45
Balls bowled	1,613
Wickets	25
Bowling average	34.96
5 wickets in innings	0
10 wickets in match	0
Best bowling	4/43
Catches/stumpings	2/–
- Source: ESPNcricinfo, 26 July 2017

Alasdair Pollock (born 24 October 1993) is an English cricketer, who played first-class cricket for Cambridge MCCU. A right-arm medium-pacer, Pollock scored 44 not out on his first-class debut, against Essex County Cricket Club, at number 9 in the order, out of a total of just 99. Pollock played 7 further first-class matches between 2013 and 2015. In his second match against Essex County Cricket Club in 2014, Pollock dismissed the then England Test Cricket captain Alastair Cook in both innings.

Pollock studied at Royal Grammar School, Worcester and, for sixth form, Shrewsbury School, then afterwards at Robinson College, Cambridge, where he obtained a BA in geography. He captained the Cambridge blues cricket team to T20 and four-day glory, but was not as successful in the one-day format.
