= Liversedge Town Hall =

Municipal building in Liversedge, West Yorkshire, England

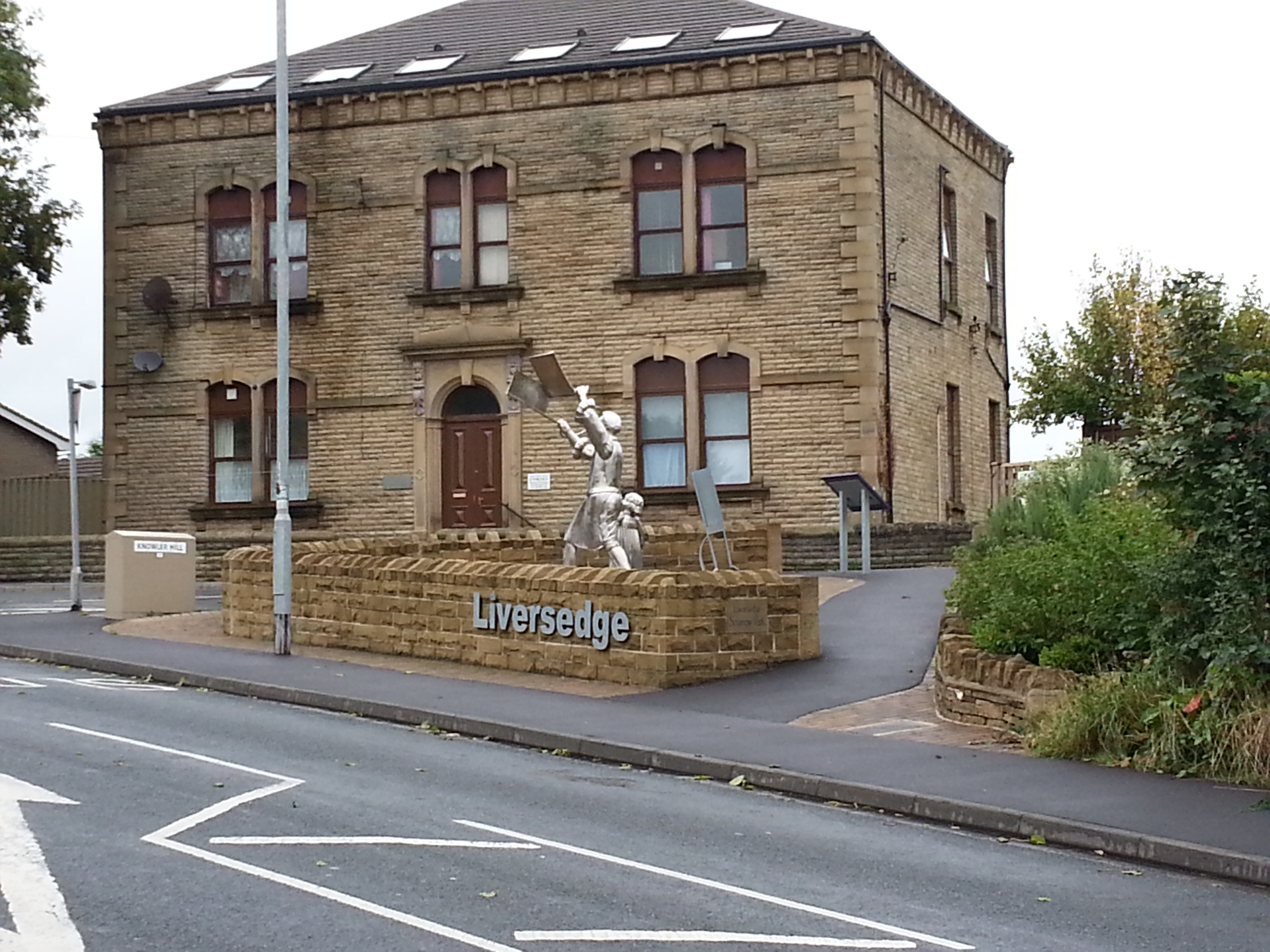
- Liversedge Town Hall

- Shown in West Yorkshire
- 53.7109°N 1.6986°W
- Location: Knowler Hill, Liversedge

History
- Built: c.1880

Site notes
- Architect: William Ellis
- Architectural style: Italianate style

Liversedge Town Hall is a former municipal building and town hall on Knowler Hill in the town of Liversedge, West Yorkshire, England. The building, which formerly operated as the offices of Liversedge Urban District Council, is now used as private residential accommodation.

== History ==
Following significant population growth, largely associated with the woollen industry, a local board of health was established in the Liversedge area in 1875. The main reason for the formation of the board was to establish proper drainage in the township, but a second order priority was to commission offices for the board itself: the site they selected for the new building was open land at the top of Knowler Hill.

The building was designed by William Ellis of Heckmondwike in the Italianate style, built in limestone brick and was completed in around 1880. The design involved a symmetrical main frontage with three bays facing onto Knowler Hill. The central bay featured a doorway with a fanlight, an archivolt and a keystone which was flanked by pilasters supporting a cornice; the pilasters were decorated with carved floral bosses. On the first floor, the central bay was fenestrated by a pair of round headed windows and the other bays were fenestrated in a similar style. At roof level there was a heavily bracketed cornice. Internally, the principal room was the boardroom for the local board.

The local board was replaced by Liversedge Urban District Council, with its headquarters in the former public offices, in 1894. The building became known as the "Town Hall" in the late 19th century and continued to serve as the headquarters of the urban district council into the early 20th century, but ceased to be the local seat of government when the enlarged Spenborough Urban District Council was formed in Cleckheaton in 1915. The building, by then known as the "Old Town Hall", was subsequently used as a community centre and a clinic with visiting medical staff. After the Second World War, it was converted for commercial use and served as an electrical store, known as "Padgett's Radio Stores", in the 1960s and 1970s, before being converted into private residential accommodation.

The significance of the building was recognised when, in 2012, a garden known as "Sparrow Park" was constructed outside the building in commemoration of the 200th anniversary of the uprising and Luddite attack on Rawfolds Mill, which began just up the road from the monument in the still-operational "Shears" public house.
