= Norristhorpe =

Village in West Yorkshire, England

Coordinates: 53.7019°N 1.6831°W

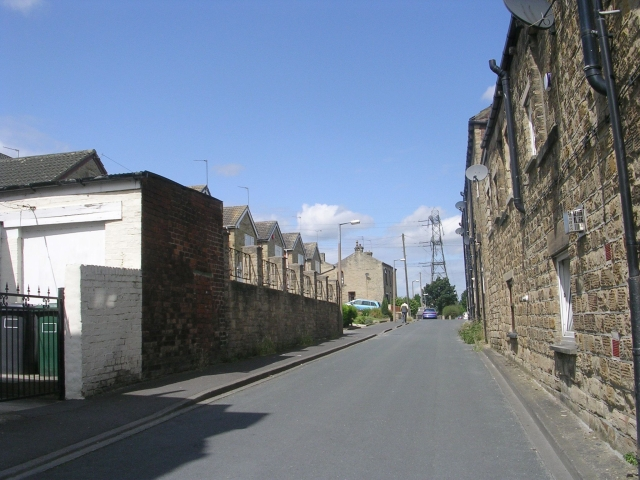
- Forge Lane

- Location within West Yorkshire
- Metropolitan borough: Kirklees
- Metropolitan county: West Yorkshire
- Region: Yorkshire and the Humber
- Country: England
- Sovereign state: United Kingdom
- Post town: LIVERSEDGE
- Postcode district: WF15
- Dialling code: 01274; 01924
- Police: West Yorkshire
- Fire: West Yorkshire
- Ambulance: Yorkshire
- UK Parliament: Spen Valley

Norristhorpe is a village in the township of Liversedge in Kirklees, West Yorkshire, England, and is historically part of the West Riding of Yorkshire.

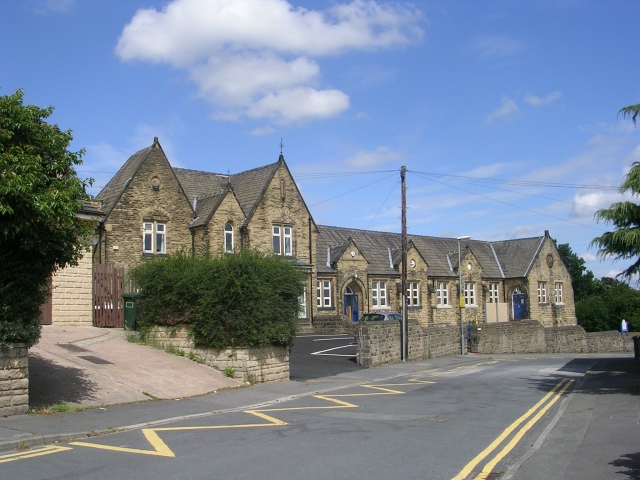
Norristhorpe Junior and Infants School

Norristhorpe has a primary school, an Anglican church, and a United Reformed Church. A Methodist chapel, built in 1906, was closed in 2004 and is now a private house.
