= Jack Shutt =

English cricketer (born 1997)

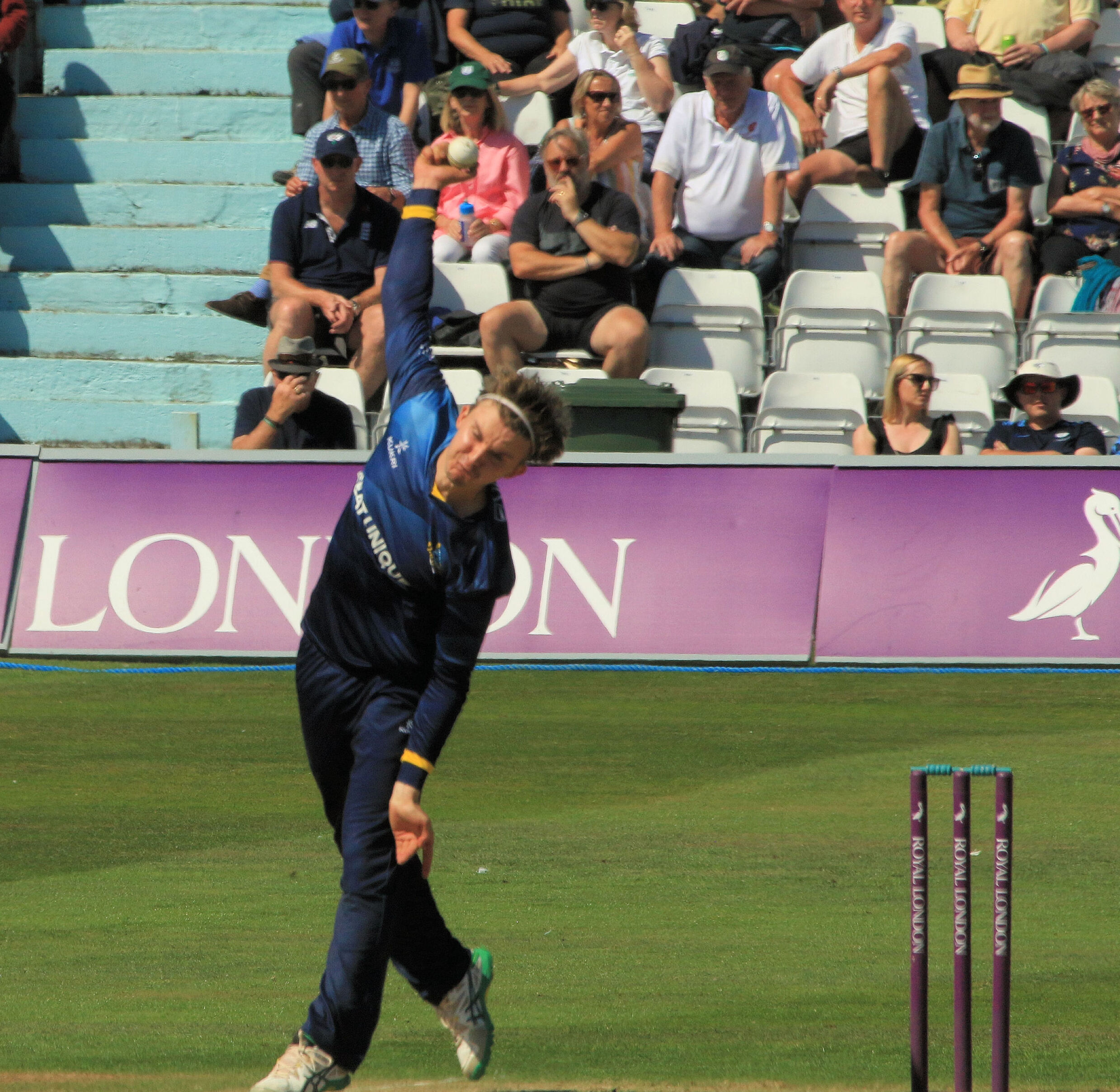
- Shutt in 2022

Personal information
- Full name: Jack William Shutt
- Born: 24 June 1997 (age 29); Barnsley, South Yorkshire, England
- Batting: Right-handed
- Bowling: Right-arm off break

Domestic team information
- Years: Team
- 2019–present: Yorkshire (squad no. 24)
- FC debut: 1 August 2020 Yorkshire v Durham
- LA debut: 22 July 2021 Yorkshire v Surrey

Career statistics
| Competition | FC | LA | T20 |
|---|---|---|---|
| Matches | 5 | 14 | 13 |
| Runs scored | 12 | 9 | 0 |
| Batting average | 6.00 | 4.50 | 0.00 |
| 100s/50s | 0/0 | 0/0 | 0/0 |
| Top score | 7* | 6* | 0* |
| Balls bowled | 230 | 472 | 252 |
| Wickets | 5 | 15 | 16 |
| Bowling average | 40.00 | 29.13 | 20.43 |
| 5 wickets in innings | 0 | 0 | 1 |
| 10 wickets in match | 0 | 0 | 0 |
| Best bowling | 2/14 | 4/46 | 5/11 |
| Catches/stumpings | 3/– | 7/– | 3/– |
- Source: Cricinfo, 1 October 2023

Jack William Shutt (born 24 June 1997) is an English cricketer. He made his Twenty20 debut on 25 July 2019, for Yorkshire in the 2019 t20 Blast. He made his first-class debut on 1 August 2020, for Yorkshire in the 2020 Bob Willis Trophy. He made his List A debut on 22 July 2021, for Yorkshire in the 2021 Royal London One-Day Cup.
