= Angus Pollock =

English cricketer

Personal information
- Full name: Angus John Pollock
- Born: 19 April 1962 (age 64); Liversedge, Yorkshire, England
- Batting: Right-handed
- Bowling: Right-arm medium
- Relatives: Alasdair Pollock (son); Ed Pollock (son)

Domestic team information
- Years: Team
- 1982–1984: Cambridge University

Career statistics
Competition	First-class	List A
Matches	23	6
Runs scored	198	49
Batting average	9.00	9.80
100s/50s	0/0	0/0
Top score	32	18
Balls bowled	3,045	341
Wickets	49	6
Bowling average	37.81	37.83
5 wickets in innings	2	0
10 wickets in match	0	0
Best bowling	5/107	2/50
Catches/stumpings	7/–	1/–
- Source: Cricinfo, 4 September 2019

Angus John Pollock (born 19 April 1962) is an English former cricketer.

Pollock was born in April 1962 at Liversedge, Yorkshire. He was educated at Shrewsbury School, before going up to Trinity College, Cambridge. While studying at Cambridge, he made his debut in first-class cricket for Cambridge University against Middlesex at Fenner's in 1982. He played first-class cricket for Cambridge until 1984, making 23 appearances. In his 24 matches, he took 49 wickets with his right-arm medium pace bowling at an average of 37.81, with best figures of 5 for 107. These figures, which were one of two five wicket hauls he took, came against Worcestershire in 1983. A lower-order batsman, he scored 198 runs at a batting average of 9.00 and a high score of 32. In addition to playing first-class cricket while at Cambridge, he also made six List A one-day appearances for the Combined Universities cricket team, making three appearances apiece in the 1982 and 1983 Benson & Hedges Cup. His sons, Alasdair and Ed, have both played first-class cricket.
