= Ed Pollock =

English cricketer (born 1995)

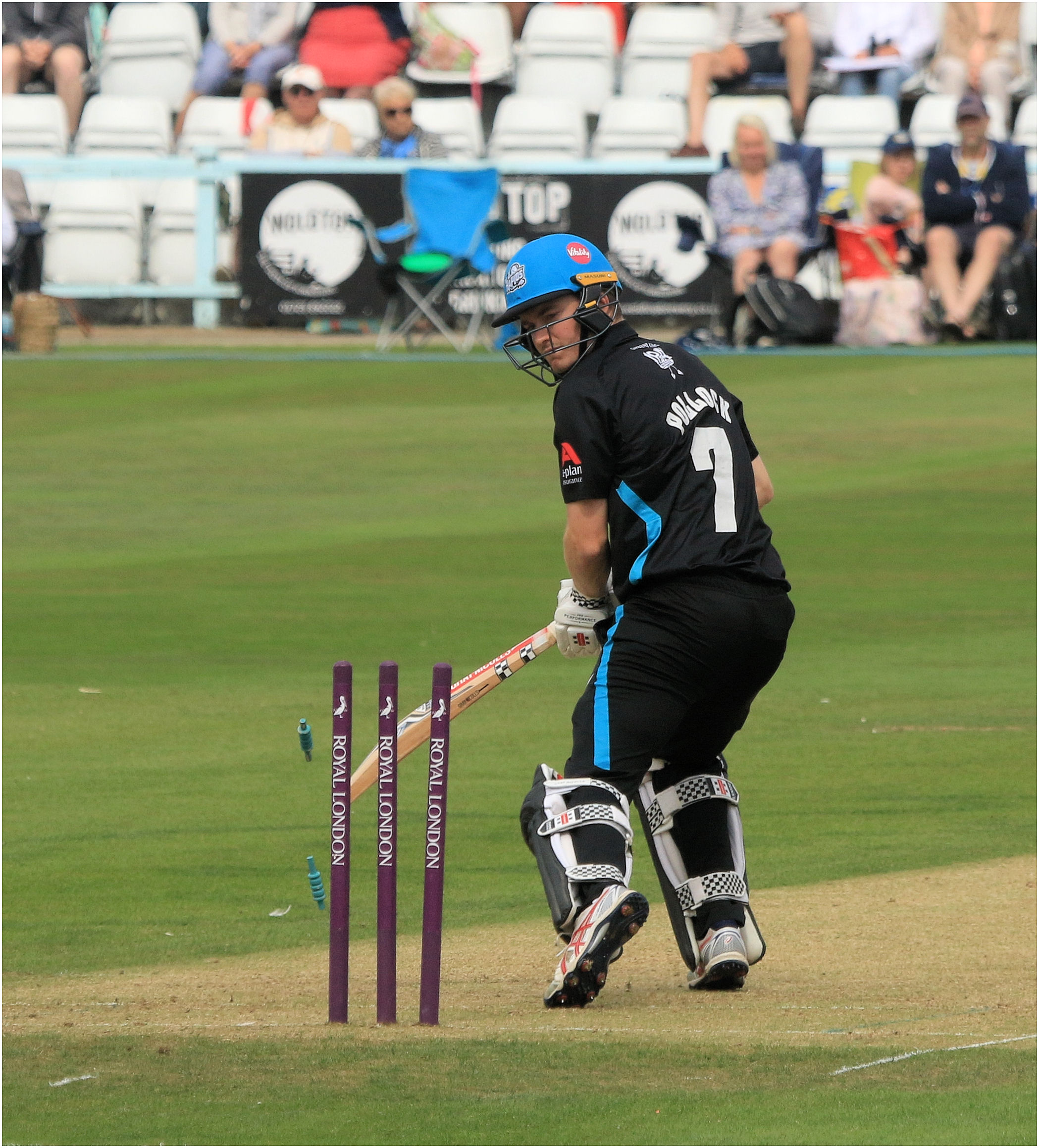
- Pollock in 2022

Personal information
- Full name: Edward John Pollock
- Born: 10 July 1995 (age 31); High Wycombe, Buckinghamshire, England
- Batting: Left-handed
- Bowling: Right-arm off break
- Role: Batsman
- Relatives: Angus Pollock (father); Alasdair Pollock (brother)

Domestic team information
- Years: Team
- 2014–2016: Herefordshire
- 2015–2017: Durham MCCU
- 2016–2021: Warwickshire
- 2022–2025: Worcestershire
- First-class debut: 2 April 2015; Durham MCCU v Somerset
- List A debut: 17 May 2018 Warwickshire v Derbyshire

Career statistics
Competition	FC	LA	T20
Matches	27	44	91
Runs scored	1,085	1,100	1,453
Batting average	25.83	26.82	19.11
100s/50s	2/5	2/4	0/7
Top score	113	180	77
Catches/stumpings	19/–	12/–	22/–
- Source: Cricinfo, 21 June 2025

Edward John Pollock (born 10 July 1995) is an English cricketer. He made his Twenty20 cricket debut for Warwickshire in the 2017 NatWest t20 Blast on 23 July 2017. He made his List A debut for Warwickshire in the 2018 Royal London One-Day Cup on 17 May 2018. In July 2021, in the 2021 Royal London One-Day Cup, Pollock scored his first century in List A cricket. In April 2022, in the opening round of matches in the 2022 County Championship, Pollock scored his maiden century in first-class cricket, with 112 runs against Leicestershire.
