= 2021 County Championship =

Cricket tournament

- Dates: 8 April – 24 September 2021
- Administrator: England and Wales Cricket Board
- Cricket format: First-class cricket (4 days)
- Tournament format: League system
- Champions: Warwickshire (8th title)
- Participants: 18
- Most runs: Tom Haines (1,176)
- Most wickets: Luke Fletcher (66)

The 2021 County Championship (referred to as the LV= Insurance County Championship for sponsorship reasons) was the 121st cricket County Championship season in England and Wales. For the first phase of the tournament, the teams were split into three groups of six, with each side playing ten matches. The top two teams from each group progressed into Division One for the second phase of the competition, with the other teams progressing to Divisions Two and Three. The team that finished top of Division One became the county champions; and the top two teams from Division One contested a five-day match at Lord's for the Bob Willis Trophy. On 17 December 2020, the England and Wales Cricket Board (ECB) confirmed all the fixtures for the tournament. After completion of the group stage on 14 July 2021, the ECB confirmed the fixtures for the division stage on 22 July 2021.

In July 2021, in Lancashire's match against Kent, James Anderson took his 1,000th first-class wicket. In September 2021, Tom Haines became the first batsman to score 1,000 runs in this edition of the Championship.

For their final match in Group 3, Kent were forced to replace their entire side for their match against Sussex, after a positive test for COVID-19 in their first XI. On the second day of Kent's match, Nathan Gilchrist was forced to withdraw from the game, after being told to self-isolate. The final Group 1 match between Derbyshire and Essex was called off prior to the start of the second day, after a member of Derbyshire's team tested positive for COVID-19. The ECB confirmed that the result of the match would be treated as a draw. On 28 August 2021, the ECB announced that the Division 2 match between Durham and Surrey had been cancelled, after a member of the Surrey team had tested positive for COVID-19.

Warwickshire won the Division One group to win their first County Championship title since 2012, with Lancashire finishing in second place. Warwickshire won the five-day match against Lancashire, to become the second winners of the Bob Willis Trophy. The Division Two title was won by Essex, with Kent winning the Division Three title.

== Teams ==
The following teams took part in the County Championship:

Team	Primary home ground	Other grounds	Coach	Captain
Derbyshire	County Ground, Derby	Queen's Park, Chesterfield	(Zimbabwe) Dave Houghton	(England) Billy Godleman
Durham	Riverside Ground, Chester-le-Street	–	(New Zealand) James Franklin	(England) Scott Borthwick
Essex	County Ground, Chelmsford	–	(England) Anthony McGrath	(England) Tom Westley
Glamorgan	Sophia Gardens, Cardiff	–	(England) Matthew Maynard	(South Africa) Chris Cooke
Gloucestershire	County Ground, Bristol	College Ground, Cheltenham	(Australia) Ian Harvey (interim)	(England) Chris Dent
Hampshire	Rose Bowl, Southampton	–	(South Africa) Adrian Birrell	(England) James Vince
Kent	St Lawrence Ground, Canterbury	–	(England) Matt Walker	(England) Sam Billings
Lancashire	Old Trafford, Manchester	Liverpool CC, Liverpool	(England) Glen Chapple	(South Africa) Dane Vilas
Leicestershire	Grace Road, Leicester	–	(England) Paul Nixon	(Netherlands) Colin Ackermann
Middlesex	Lord's, London	Merchant Taylors' School Ground, Northwood	(Australia) Stuart Law	(England) Stephen Eskinazi
Northamptonshire	County Ground, Northampton	–	(England) David Ripley	(England) Adam Rossington
Nottinghamshire	Trent Bridge, Nottingham	–	(England) Peter Moores	(England) Steven Mullaney
Somerset	County Ground, Taunton	–	(England) Jason Kerr	(England) Tom Abell
Surrey	The Oval, London	–	(England) Vikram Solanki	(England) Rory Burns
Sussex	County Ground, Hove	–	(England) Ian Salisbury	(England) Ben Brown
Warwickshire	Edgbaston, Birmingham	–	(England) Mark Robinson	(England) Will Rhodes
Worcestershire	New Road, Worcester	–	(England) Alex Gidman	(England) Joe Leach
Yorkshire	Headingley, Leeds	North Marine Road Ground, Scarborough	(England) Andrew Gale	(England) Steven Patterson

== Group stage ==
=== Teams ===
The teams were placed into the following groups for the group stage:

- Group 1: Derbyshire, Durham, Essex, Nottinghamshire, Warwickshire, Worcestershire
- Group 2: Gloucestershire, Hampshire, Leicestershire, Middlesex, Somerset, Surrey
- Group 3: Glamorgan, Kent, Lancashire, Northamptonshire, Sussex, Yorkshire

=== Fixtures ===
==== Group 1 ====
8–11 April 2021
Scorecard

Essex	v	Worcestershire
490/9d (157.4 overs); Tom Westley 213 (408); Ed Barnard 2/67 (27 overs)		475 (177.3 overs); Jake Libby 180* (496); Sam Cook 4/100 (37 overs)
28/1 (10 overs); Alastair Cook 12* (17); Joe Leach 1/14 (4 overs)

Match drawn
County Cricket Ground, Chelmsford
Umpires: David Millns and Neil Mallender

- Essex won the toss and elected to bat.
- Jake Libby (Worcestershire) carried the bat.

8–11 April 2021
Scorecard

Derbyshire	v	Warwickshire
189 (78.2 overs); Matt Critchley 64 (97); Liam Norwell 5/32 (18 overs)		221 (75.2 overs); Matt Lamb 54 (113); Matt Critchley 2/22 (6 overs)
244 (72.4 overs); Matt Critchley 83 (158); Oliver Hannon-Dalby 5/29 (9 overs)		7/0 (4.1 overs); Will Rhodes 5* (16)

Match drawn
Edgbaston Cricket Ground, Birmingham
Umpires: Alex Wharf and Richard Illingworth

- Warwickshire won the toss and elected to field.

8–11 April 2021
Scorecard

Durham	v	Nottinghamshire
330 (121.2 overs); Ben Raine 59* (121); Luke Fletcher 3/83 (29.3 overs)		267 (74.1 overs); Tom Moores 96* (151); Matt Salisbury 4/74 (19 overs)
332/4d (76 overs); David Bedingham 180* (228); Brett Hutton 2/33 (10.5 overs)		298/5 (83.3 overs); Lyndon James 79* (155); Chris Rushworth 2/36 (17 overs)

Match drawn
Trent Bridge, Nottingham
Umpires: Ben Debenham and Ian Gould

- Nottinghamshire won the toss and elected to field.

15–18 April 2021
Scorecard

Derbyshire	v	Worcestershire
390 (111.2 overs); Matt Critchley 109 (159); Ed Barnard 4/67 (25.2 overs)		305 (102 overs); Tom Fell 69 (147); Matt Critchley 5/67 (25 overs)
312/5d (80 overs); Matt Critchley 84 (109); Daryl Mitchell 2/34 (15 overs)		193/8 (83.5 overs); Ben Cox 60* (148); Ben Aitchison 3/18 (12 overs)

Match drawn
County Cricket Ground, Derby
Umpires: Paul Baldwin and Tim Robinson

- Worcestershire won the toss and elected to field.

15–18 April 2021
Scorecard

Essex	v	Durham
96 (41.3 overs); Dan Lawrence 32 (68); Chris Rushworth 3/13 (11 overs)		259 (82.3 overs); Scott Borthwick 100 (129); Simon Harmer 5/79 (34 overs)
330 (122.2 overs); Paul Walter 77 (134); Brydon Carse 5/82 (27.2 overs)		123 (56.4 overs); Jack Burnham 43 (82); Simon Harmer 5/57 (24 overs)

Essex won by 44 runs
County Cricket Ground, Chelmsford
Umpires: Billy Taylor and Peter Hartley

- Essex won the toss and elected to bat.

15–18 April 2021
Scorecard

Nottinghamshire	v	Warwickshire
273 (88 overs); Liam Patterson-White 73* (117); Will Rhodes 4/53 (18 overs)		201 (70.4 overs); Sam Hain 72 (142); Stuart Broad 3/50 (19 overs)
260 (88.2 overs); Joe Clarke 56 (96); Danny Briggs 4/68 (23.2 overs)		333/7 (121.5 overs); Tim Bresnan 68* (149); Dane Paterson 3/77 (29.5 overs)

Warwickshire won by 3 wickets
Trent Bridge, Nottingham
Umpires: Neil Mallender and Steve O'Shaughnessy

- Nottinghamshire won the toss and elected to bat.

22–25 April 2021
Scorecard

Worcestershire	v	Nottinghamshire
436 (145.1 overs); Jake Libby 117 (217); Liam Patterson-White 4/114 (41.1 overs)		276 (104.4 overs); Haseeb Hameed 111 (304); Charlie Morris 3/30 (20 overs)
		236/0d (109 overs) (f/o); Ben Slater 114* (323)

Match drawn
New Road, Worcester
Umpires: Richard Illingworth and Russell Warren

- Worcestershire won the toss and elected to bat.

22–25 April 2021
Scorecard

Essex	v	Warwickshire
295 (89.5 overs); Nick Browne 68 (169); Oliver Hannon-Dalby 4/73 (20.5 overs)		284 (111.1 overs); Danny Briggs 66* (119); Simon Harmer 4/89 (38.1 overs)
244 (94 overs); Simon Harmer 82* (217); Craig Miles 4/70 (22 overs)		256/3 (80.4 overs); Rob Yates 120* (231); Paul Walter 2/18 (5 overs)

Warwickshire won by 7 wickets
Edgbaston Cricket Ground, Birmingham
Umpires: Alex Wharf and Mike Burns

- Essex won the toss and elected to bat.

22–25 April 2021
Scorecard

Durham	v	Derbyshire
475 (147.4 overs); David Bedingham 257 (410); Sam Conners 5/83 (24.4 overs)		267 (83.1 overs); Wayne Madsen 76 (111); Chris Rushworth 6/58 (22 overs)
175/2d (44.5 overs); Alex Lees 78* (131); Fynn Hudson-Prentice 1/27 (8 overs)		280/5 (97 overs); Wayne Madsen 74 (138); Ben Raine 3/58 (24 overs)

Match drawn
Riverside Ground, Chester-le-Street
Umpires: Neil Mallender and Richard Kettleborough

- Durham won the toss and elected to bat.
- George Scrimshaw (Derbyshire) made his first-class debut.
- David Bedingham (Durham) scored his maiden double century in first-class cricket.
- Chris Rushworth (Durham) took his 500th wicket in the County Championship.
- Sam Conners (Derbyshire) took his maiden five-wicket haul in first-class cricket.

29 April–2 May 2021
Scorecard

Nottinghamshire	v	Derbyshire
256 (68.4 overs); Ben Slater 107 (191); Fynn Hudson-Prentice 4/36 (16.4 overs)		105 (34.5 overs); Matt Critchley 33 (30); Luke Fletcher 5/28 (14.5 overs)
318 (70.4 overs); Haseeb Hameed 94 (142); Fynn Hudson-Prentice 4/40 (12.4 overs)		159 (41.5 overs); Ben Aitchison 50 (49); Stuart Broad 4/37 (13 overs)

Nottinghamshire won by 310 runs
County Cricket Ground, Derby
Umpires: Billy Taylor and Tim Robinson

- Derbyshire won the toss and elected to field.

29 April–2 May 2021
Scorecard

Essex	v	Worcestershire
561/8d (174 overs); Alastair Cook 115 (263); Brett D'Oliveira 3/147 (46 overs)		364 (138.1 overs); Daryl Mitchell 67 (141); Sam Cook 4/60 (29 overs)
		129/2 (57 overs) (f/o); Jake Libby 52* (139); Sam Cook 2/7 (11 overs)

Match drawn
New Road, Worcester
Umpires: Graham Lloyd and Rob White

- Essex won the toss and elected to bat.

29 April–2 May 2021
Scorecard

Warwickshire	v	Durham
87 (42.5 overs); Liam Norwell 25 (66); Ben Raine 5/9 (13 overs)		391/9d (145 overs); Alex Lees 129 (353); Danny Briggs 4/93 (31 overs)
177 (67.3 overs); Tim Bresnan 39* (89); Brydon Carse 5/49 (14 overs)

Durham won by an innings and 127 runs
Riverside Ground, Chester-le-Street
Umpires: Michael Gough and Russell Warren

- Durham won the toss and elected to field.

6–9 May 2021
Scorecard

Warwickshire	v	Worcestershire
343 (117.2 overs); Rob Yates 104 (229); Ed Barnard 3/76 (21.2 overs)		364/8d (113 overs); Jack Haynes 87 (211); Will Rhodes 2/39 (12 overs)
70/3 (25 overs); Pieter Malan 28 (31); Alzarri Joseph 2/22 (6 overs)

Match drawn
Edgbaston Cricket Ground, Birmingham
Umpires: Ian Blackwell and Martin Saggers

- Worcestershire won the toss and elected to field.
- No play was possible on day 3 due to rain.

6–9 May 2021
Scorecard

Essex	v	Nottinghamshire
99 (41 overs); Nick Browne 53 (112); Luke Fletcher 6/24 (16 overs)		323 (86 overs); Steven Mullaney 117 (160); Shane Snater 7/98 (26 overs)
194 (85.2 overs); Nick Browne 64 (197); Lyndon James 4/51 (20 overs)

Nottinghamshire won by an innings and 30 runs
Trent Bridge, Nottingham
Umpires: Rob Bailey and Steve O'Shaughnessy

- Nottinghamshire won the toss and elected to field.
- No play was possible on day 3 due to rain.

13–16 May 2021
Scorecard

Durham	v	Worcestershire
246 (82.2 overs); Alex Lees 99 (202); Josh Tongue 5/39 (19.2 overs)		213 (69.4 overs); Tom Fell 44 (95); Chris Rushworth 5/56 (18.4 overs)
389/5d (110.5 overs); Will Young 103 (254); Josh Tongue 2/59 (21 overs)		164 (60.2 overs); Daryl Mitchell 62 (72); Chris Rushworth 4/52 (20 overs)

Durham won by 258 runs
Riverside Ground, Chester-le-Street
Umpires: Michael Gough and Steve O'Shaughnessy

- Worcestershire won the toss and elected to field.
- Chris Rushworth became the leading wicket-taker for Durham, taking his 528th first-class wicket for the county.

13–16 May 2021
Scorecard

Essex	v	Derbyshire
412/3d (76 overs); Dan Lawrence 152* (133); Billy Stanlake 2/91 (17 overs)		146 (56.5 overs); Brooke Guest 49 (116); Simon Harmer 9/80 (25.5 overs)
		251 (92.4 overs) (f/o); Brooke Guest 65 (141); Jamie Porter 3/41 (19 overs)

Essex won by an innings and 15 runs
County Cricket Ground, Chelmsford
Umpires: Hassan Adnan and Ian Blackwell

- Derbyshire won the toss and elected to field.
- No play was possible on day 1 due to rain.

20–23 May 2021
Scorecard

Nottinghamshire	v	Worcestershire
400/5d (84.3 overs); Ben Duckett 177* (196); Dillon Pennington 2/66 (19 overs)		80 (32.5 overs); Ben Cox 12 (61); Luke Fletcher 7/37 (16 overs)
		150 (57.4 overs) (f/o); Jake Libby 64 (80); Dane Paterson 4/49 (18.4 overs)

Nottinghamshire won by an innings and 170 runs
Trent Bridge, Nottingham
Umpires: Alex Wharf and Billy Taylor

- Worcestershire won the toss and elected to field.
- Only 15.5 overs of play were possible on day 1 due to rain.
- No play was possible on day 2 due to rain.

20–23 May 2021
Scorecard

Warwickshire	v	Essex
166 (69.2 overs); Tim Bresnan 50 (105); Peter Siddle 6/38 (21 overs)		217 (82.3 overs); Alastair Cook 57 (105); Will Rhodes 3/21 (11 overs)
66/1 (23.5 overs); Danny Briggs 37* (66); Sam Cook 1/7 (8.5 overs)

Match drawn
County Cricket Ground, Chelmsford
Umpires: Ben Debenham and Ian Gould

- Warwickshire won the toss and elected to bat.
- Only 10.3 overs of play were possible on day 2 due to rain.

20–23 May 2021
Scorecard

Derbyshire	v	Durham
258 (87.4 overs); Matt Critchley 49 (92); Chris Rushworth 6/49 (19.4 overs)		208 (67.4 overs); Ned Eckersley 82 (96); Ben Aitchison 6/28 (16 overs)

Match drawn
County Cricket Ground, Derby
Umpires: Peter Hartley and Tim Robinson

- Durham won the toss and elected to field.
- Only 17 overs of play were possible on day 1 due to rain.
- No play was possible on day 2 due to rain.
- Anuj Dal replaced Harvey Hosein for Derbyshire during day 3 as a concussion substitute.

27–30 May 2021
Scorecard

Essex	v	Durham
182 (62.2 overs); Michael Pepper 92 (167); Chris Rushworth 4/32 (16 overs)		99 (47.4 overs); Cameron Bancroft 20 (67); Sam Cook 4/38 (21 overs)
301 (89.5 overs); Adam Wheater 81 (132); Ben Raine 5/64 (23.5 overs)		189 (87 overs); Alex Lees 48 (119); Jamie Porter 4/31 (19 overs)

Essex won by 195 runs
Riverside Ground, Chester-le-Street
Umpires: David Millns and James Middlebrook

- Durham won the toss and elected to field.

27–30 May 2021
Scorecard

Warwickshire	v	Nottinghamshire
341 (119.1 overs); Will Rhodes 91 (189); Dane Paterson 5/90 (28 overs)		297 (95.2 overs); Ben Slater 77 (160); Liam Norwell 4/64 (20 overs)
264 (85.1 overs); Michael Burgess 80 (128); Luke Fletcher 4/38 (14.1 overs)		138 (65.3 overs); Ben Slater 27 (36); Danny Briggs 4/36 (24.3 overs)

Warwickshire won by 170 runs
Edgbaston Cricket Ground, Birmingham
Umpires: Graham Lloyd and Russell Warren

- Nottinghamshire won the toss and elected to field.

27–30 May 2021
Scorecard

Worcestershire	v	Derbyshire
421 (121.2 overs); Jack Haynes 97 (187); Dustin Melton 3/76 (16 overs)		270 (82.4 overs); Wayne Madsen 51 (132); Dillon Pennington 4/44 (19.4 overs)
		128 (58.2 overs) (f/o); Wayne Madsen 45 (86); Dillon Pennington 5/32 (14 overs)

Worcestershire won by an innings and 23 runs
New Road, Worcester
Umpires: Ben Debenham and Rob Bailey

- Worcestershire won the toss and elected to bat.
- Dillon Pennington (Worcestershire) took his maiden five-wicket haul in first-class cricket.

3–6 June 2021
Scorecard

Worcestershire	v	Durham
131 (50.3 overs); Brett D'Oliveira 39* (111); Brydon Carse 4/25 (13 overs)		381 (109.3 overs); David Bedingham 121 (183); Josh Tongue 4/73 (25 overs)
336 (102.5 overs); Jake Libby 126 (210); Matty Potts 4/66 (24 overs)		89/0 (20.2 overs); Cameron Bancroft 46* (71)

Durham won by 10 wickets
New Road, Worcester
Umpires: David Millns and Neil Bainton

- Durham won the toss and elected to field.

3–6 June 2021
Scorecard

Nottinghamshire	v	Essex
293 (118.1 overs); Joe Clarke 67 (119); Simon Harmer 4/71 (33.1 overs)		210 (89.1 overs); Tom Westley 71 (174); Brett Hutton 5/65 (26.1 overs)
44/2 (27.2 overs); Ben Slater 19* (87); Peter Siddle 1/10 (6.2 overs)

Match drawn
County Cricket Ground, Chelmsford
Umpires: Ian Blackwell and Neil Mallender

- Nottinghamshire won the toss and elected to bat.
- No play was possible on day 2 due to rain.
- Brett Hutton (Nottinghamshire) took his 200th first-class wicket.

3–6 June 2021
Scorecard

Warwickshire	v	Derbyshire
274 (99.3 overs); Sam Hain 77 (161); Sam Conners 4/46 (18 overs)		121 (39.4 overs); Billy Godleman 32 (48); Craig Miles 5/30 (11.4 overs)
155 (58 overs); Sam Hain 46 (90); Michael Cohen 5/43 (16 overs)		117 (39.5 overs); Wayne Madsen 29 (50); Oliver Hannon-Dalby 4/24 (12 overs)

Warwickshire won by 191 runs
County Cricket Ground, Derby
Umpires: Billy Taylor and Nigel Llong

- Derbyshire won the toss and elected to field.

4–7 July 2021
Scorecard

Derbyshire	v	Nottinghamshire
149 (79.1 overs); Fynn Hudson-Prentice 30 (53); Luke Fletcher 3/36 (24 overs)		307 (88.4 overs); Ben Duckett 69* (81); Fynn Hudson-Prentice 5/68 (28 overs)
122 (46.4 overs); Matt Critchley 36 (47); Luke Fletcher 5/28 (11.4 overs)

Nottinghamshire won by an innings and 36 runs
Trent Bridge, Nottingham
Umpires: Neil Bainton and Neil Pratt

- Nottinghamshire won the toss and elected to field.
- Dane Schadendorf (Nottinghamshire) made his first-class debut.
- Dane Schadendorf replaced Ben Duckett for Nottinghamshire on day 3 due to an international call-up.

4–7 July 2021
Scorecard

Warwickshire	v	Durham
237 (95 overs); Rob Yates 102 (239); Ben Raine 3/51 (22 overs)		253/7 (90 overs); David Bedingham 92* (161); Craig Miles 5/62 (23 overs)

Match drawn
Edgbaston Cricket Ground, Birmingham
Umpires: Ian Ramage and Paul Pollard

- Durham won the toss and elected to field.
- No play was possible on day 1 due to rain.
- Ethan Brookes replaced Danny Briggs (Warwickshire), while Jack Burnham and Graham Clark replaced Brydon Carse and Ben Stokes (Durham), on day 3 due to international call-ups.

11–14 July 2021
Scorecard

Nottinghamshire	v	Durham
328 (100.2 overs); Liam Patterson-White 73 (116); Chris Rushworth 4/75 (26.2 overs)		165 (54.1 overs); Scott Borthwick 38 (89); Joey Evison 5/21 (8 overs)
217 (64.3 overs); Haseeb Hameed 58 (117); Scott Borthwick 4/32 (5.3 overs)		188/4 (55 overs); Michael Jones 46 (95); Steven Mullaney 1/16 (9 overs)

Match drawn
Riverside Ground, Chester-le-Street
Umpires: Nigel Llong and Neil Pratt

- Durham won the toss and elected to field.
- No play was possible on day 2 due to rain.

11–14 July 2021
Scorecard

Warwickshire	v	Worcestershire
395 (120.2 overs); Pieter Malan 141 (207); Ish Sodhi 6/89 (30.2 overs)		447/9d (174 overs); Daryl Mitchell 113 (280); Liam Norwell 3/69 (30 overs)
215/2d (59.5 overs); Rob Yates 88 (173); Josh Baker 1/67 (17 overs)

Match drawn
New Road, Worcester
Umpires: Nick Cook and Chris Watts

- Warwickshire won the toss and elected to bat.
- Josh Baker (Worcestershire) and Jake Lintott (Warwickshire) both made their first-class debuts.

11–14 July 2021
Scorecard

Derbyshire	v	Essex
146 (57.1 overs); Leus du Plooy 43 (91); Shane Snater 3/45 (14 overs)		86/3 (38 overs); Alastair Cook 30 (46); Fynn Hudson-Prentice 2/24 (10 overs)

Match drawn
Queen's Park, Chesterfield
Umpires: James Middlebrook and Neil Mallender

- Derbyshire won the toss and elected to bat.
- The match was abandoned ahead of the second day due to a positive COVID-19 test in Derbyshire's squad.

==== Group 2 ====
8–11 April 2021
Scorecard

Middlesex	v	Somerset
313 (102.4 overs); Sam Robson 165 (263); Lewis Gregory 5/68 (20 overs)		172 (48.5 overs); Marchant de Lange 51 (50); Tim Murtagh 4/46 (14 overs)
143 (51.4 overs); Stephen Eskinazi 53 (126); Jack Leach 3/18 (11.4 overs)		285/6 (77.2 overs); Tom Abell 84 (145); Ethan Bamber 3/77 (20.2 overs)

Somerset won by 4 wickets
Lord's, London
Umpires: Chris Watts and Richard Kettleborough

- Somerset won the toss and elected to field.

8–11 April 2021
Scorecard

Hampshire	v	Leicestershire
612/5d (120 overs); James Vince 231 (220); Chris Wright 2/111 (26 overs)		202 (76.5 overs); Harry Swindells 59 (109); Kyle Abbott 3/27 (14 overs)
		305 (95.5 overs) (f/o); Lewis Hill 65 (121); Mason Crane 3/102 (29 overs)

Hampshire won by an innings and 105 runs
Grace Road, Leicester
Umpires: Billy Taylor and Michael Gough

- Hampshire won the toss and elected to bat.

8–11 April 2021
Scorecard

Surrey	v	Gloucestershire
220 (70.3 overs); Hashim Amla 56 (99); Josh Shaw 4/48 (16 overs)		326 (94 overs); Chris Dent 78 (96); Reece Topley 5/66 (24 overs)
333 (104 overs); Ben Foakes 133 (250); Matthew Taylor 4/94 (29 overs)		229/2 (37.1 overs); Graeme van Buuren 110* (98); Amar Virdi 1/54 (11 overs)

Gloucestershire won by 8 wickets
Bristol County Ground, Bristol
Umpires: Ian Blackwell and Rob White

- Gloucestershire won the toss and elected to field.

15–18 April 2021
Scorecard

Somerset	v	Gloucestershire
312 (94.1 overs); Steven Davies 87 (180); Matthew Taylor 3/67 (17.1 overs)		309 (110.1 overs); James Bracey 118 (234); Marchant de Lange 4/63 (21.1 overs)
149 (65.5 overs); James Hildreth 64 (150); Ryan Higgins 4/29 (16.5 overs)		156/2 (41.1 overs); James Bracey 83* (122); Marchant de Lange 1/13 (6 overs)

Gloucestershire won by 8 wickets
County Ground, Taunton
Umpires: Neil Bainton and Richard Illingworth

- Gloucestershire won the toss and elected to field.
- Dominic Goodman (Gloucestershire) made his first-class debut.

15–18 April 2021
Scorecard

Hampshire	v	Middlesex
319 (110.2 overs); Ian Holland 64 (138); Steven Finn 4/96 (25.2 overs)		79 (34.4 overs); Nathan Sowter 24* (57); Mohammad Abbas 6/11 (11 overs)
290/4d (67 overs); Ian Holland 146* (186); Steven Finn 2/47 (11 overs)		281 (99 overs); Robbie White 73 (161); Ian Holland 3/19 (9 overs)

Hampshire won by 249 runs
Rose Bowl, Southampton
Umpires: Nigel Llong and Tom Lungley

- Hampshire won the toss and elected to bat.
- Mohammad Abbas (Hampshire) took a hat-trick during Middlesex's first innings.

15–18 April 2021
Scorecard

Leicestershire	v	Surrey
375 (117.3 overs); Sam Evans 138 (280); Jordan Clark 3/52 (20 overs)		672/8d (141.4 overs); Ollie Pope 245 (272); Colin Ackermann 2/90 (21 overs)
295/3 (92 overs); Hassan Azad 144* (280); Jordan Clark 2/37 (11 overs)

Match drawn
The Oval, London
Umpires: Graham Lloyd and Paul Pollard

- Leicestershire won the toss and elected to bat.

22–25 April 2021
Scorecard

Leicestershire	v	Somerset
233 (82.4 overs); Lewis Hill 68 (119); Craig Overton 3/39 (17.4 overs)		318 (80.2 overs); Tom Abell 88 (142); Ben Mike 3/50 (14 overs)
199 (70.4 overs); Harry Swindells 49 (98); Craig Overton 5/25 (18 overs)		118/1 (26.5 overs); Tom Lammonby 70* (80); Chris Wright 1/16 (5 overs)

Somerset won by 9 wickets
Grace Road, Leicester
Umpires: Rob Bailey and Tim Robinson

- Leicestershire won the toss and elected to bat.
- Rishi Patel replaced Colin Ackermann for Leicestershire ahead of Day 3 as a concussion replacement.

22–25 April 2021
Scorecard

Hampshire	v	Gloucestershire
470 (144.1 overs); Tom Alsop 149 (290); Daniel Worrall 4/75 (31)		320 (132.1 overs); Ryan Higgins 73 (139); Mohammad Abbas 4/41 (19 overs)
		197/9 (97 overs) (f/o); Tom Lace 38 (102); Brad Wheal 4/59 (21 overs)

Match drawn
Rose Bowl, Southampton
Umpires: Ben Debenham and David Millns

- Hampshire won the toss and elected to bat.

22–25 April 2021
Scorecard

Surrey	v	Middlesex
154 (55.4 overs); Mark Stoneman 44 (106); Tim Murtagh 4/28 (15 overs)		268 (100.5 overs); Sam Robson 95 (256); Reece Topley 4/56 (26 overs)
130 (52 overs); Rory Burns 54 (103); Toby Roland-Jones 4/29 (12 overs)		18/0 (2.3 overs); Max Holden 11* (11)

Middlesex won by 10 wickets
Lord's, London
Umpires: Michael Gough and Neil Bainton

- Middlesex won the toss and elected to field.
- Luke Hollman (Middlesex) made his first-class debut.

29 April–2 May 2021
Scorecard

Middlesex	v	Somerset
357 (110 overs); Robbie White 92 (244); Josh Davey 3/33 (14 overs)		268 (80.2 overs); George Bartlett 55 (114); Steven Finn 5/77 (20 overs)
117 (50 overs); Max Holden 30 (40); Craig Overton 5/34 (19 overs)		209/6 (57.4 overs); Tom Abell 49 (107); Tim Murtagh 4/53 (21 overs)

Somerset won by 4 wickets
County Ground, Taunton
Umpires: Ian Gould and Mike Burns

- Somerset won the toss and elected to field.
- Lewis Goldsworthy (Somerset) made his first-class debut.
- Jack Brooks replaced Lewis Gregory for Somerset ahead of Day 3 as a COVID-19 replacement.

29 April–2 May 2021
Scorecard

Hampshire	v	Surrey
92 (34.3 overs); Lewis McManus 31* (44); Jordan Clark 6/91 (10.3 overs)		560/7d (142.5 overs); Hashim Amla 215* (367); Scott Currie 4/109 (27.5 overs)
179 (60.3 overs); Lewis McManus 51 (129); Kemar Roach 8/40 (18.3 overs)

Surrey won by an innings and 289 runs
The Oval, London
Umpires: Paul Baldwin and Richard Kettleborough

- Surrey won the toss and elected to field.

29 April–2 May 2021
Scorecard

Leicestershire	v	Gloucestershire
421 (144.1 overs); Lewis Hill 121 (221); Daniel Worrall 5/79 (34.1 overs)		275 (78.2 overs); Chris Dent 53 (83); Chris Wright 7/53 (24.2 overs)
201 (49.4 overs); Rishi Patel 44 (48); Ryan Higgins 5/62 (16.4 overs)		348/6 (78.2 overs); Ian Cockbain 117 (179); Callum Parkinson 3/93 (26 overs)

Gloucestershire won by 4 wickets
Bristol County Ground, Bristol
Umpires: Nigel Llong and Richard Illingworth

- Gloucestershire won the toss and elected to field.

6–9 May 2021
Scorecard

Middlesex	v	Gloucestershire
210 (80.5 overs); Robbie White 76* (149); David Payne 5/31 (18.5 overs)		273 (87.2 overs); James Bracey 75 (143); Martin Andersson 3/64 (15 overs)
152 (51.1 overs); Nick Gubbins 52 (100); David Payne 6/56 (17 overs)		93/3 (26.1 overs); Tom Lace 31* (34); Ethan Bamber 2/30 (9 overs)

Gloucestershire won by 7 wickets
Lord's, London
Umpires: Billy Taylor and Paul Pollard

- Gloucestershire won the toss and elected to field.

6–9 May 2021
Scorecard

Hampshire	v	Somerset
79 (40.3 overs); Joe Weatherley 20 (69); Lewis Gregory 4/26 (13.3 overs)		336 (99 overs); Craig Overton 74 (93); Keith Barker 4/67 (24 overs)
258 (131 overs); Keith Barker 52* (95); Josh Davey 5/30 (24 overs)		2/0 (0.1 overs); Eddie Byrom 2* (1)

Somerset won by 10 wickets
Rose Bowl, Southampton
Umpires: Alex Wharf and Graham Lloyd

- Somerset won the toss and elected to field.
- Only 9.3 overs of play were possible on day 3 due to rain.

6–9 May 2021
Scorecard

Leicestershire	v	Surrey
496 (141.2 overs); Sam Evans 112 (221); Amar Virdi 6/171 (44.2 overs)		324 (87.5 overs); Mark Stoneman 119 (247); Chris Wright 5/60 (24 overs)

Match drawn
Grace Road, Leicester
Umpires: Ian Gould and Richard Illingworth

- Leicestershire won the toss and elected to bat.
- No play was possible on day 3 due to rain.

13–16 May 2021
Scorecard

Middlesex	v	Hampshire
172 (68.1 overs); Nick Gubbins 51 (131); Kyle Abbott 6/44 (18.1 overs)		208 (73 overs); Keith Barker 84 (116); Tim Murtagh 3/48 (16 overs)
101 (29.5 overs); Peter Handscomb 24 (12); Kyle Abbott 5/41 (9.5 overs)		66/3 (15.3 overs); Ian Holland 22 (32); Tim Murtagh 2/29 (3.3 overs)

Hampshire won by 7 wickets
Lord's, London
Umpires: Neil Bainton and Neil Mallender

- Hampshire won the toss and elected to field.

13–16 May 2021
Scorecard

Surrey	v	Somerset
206/4 (68 overs); Rory Burns 55 (104); Lewis Gregory 2/64 (22 overs)

Match drawn
County Ground, Taunton
Umpires: Nick Cook and Russell Warren

- Somerset won the toss and elected to field.
- No play was possible on day 1 due to rain.
- Only 9 overs of play was possible on day 3 due to rain.
- No play was possible on day 4 due to a wet outfield.

19–22 May 2021
Scorecard

Hampshire	v	Leicestershire
233 (71 overs); Ian Holland 82 (136); Ed Barnes 4/61 (19 overs)		84 (35.5 overs); Rishi Patel 27 (54); Kyle Abbott 6/47 (14 overs)
0/0f (0 overs)		26/1 (17 overs); Sam Evans 8 (23); Kyle Abbott 1/6 (6 overs)

Match drawn
Rose Bowl, Southampton
Umpires: Martin Saggers and Nigel Llong

- Leicestershire won the toss and elected to field.
- Only 26.2 overs of play were possible on day 1 due to rain.
- With overs lost in the game due to the weather, Hampshire forfeited their second innings in an attempt to produce a result.

20–23 May 2021
Scorecard

Surrey	v	Middlesex
190 (77.1 overs); Rory Burns 64 (156); Martin Andersson 3/30 (7 overs)		160 (46.3 overs); John Simpson 68 (100); Jordan Clark 4/41 (13.3 overs)
259/2d (56.1 overs); Rory Burns 104* (160); Ethan Bamber 1/39 (9 overs)		250/6 (56.3 overs); Nick Gubbins 124 (145); Kemar Roach 5/86 (19 overs)

Match drawn
The Oval, London
Umpires: Graham Lloyd and Ian Blackwell

- Middlesex won the toss and elected to field.
- Only 18 overs of play were possible on day 2 due to rain.

20–23 May 2021
Scorecard

Somerset	v	Gloucestershire
300/8d (101.3 overs); Tom Abell 132* (287); Daniel Worrall 3/52 (20.3 overs)		27/6 (14.2 overs); Kraigg Brathwaite 15 (42); Craig Overton 4/16 (7.2 overs)

Match drawn
Bristol County Ground, Bristol
Umpires: Paul Baldwin and Steve O'Shaughnessy

- Gloucestershire won the toss and elected to field.
- Only 20.2 overs of play were possible on day 1 due to rain.
- No play was possible on day 2 due to rain.

27–30 May 2021
Scorecard

Surrey	v	Gloucestershire
473 (158 overs); Hashim Amla 173 (347); Ryan Higgins 4/69 (29 overs)		158 (75.5 overs); Miles Hammond 77 (188); Dan Moriarty 6/60 (26.5 overs)
		268 (78.5 overs) (f/o); Jonny Tattersall 86* (136); Amar Virdi 4/96 (26 overs)

Surrey won by an innings and 47 runs
The Oval, London
Umpires: Billy Taylor and Ian Gould

- Surrey won the toss and elected to bat.

27–30 May 2021
Scorecard

Middlesex	v	Leicestershire
295 (111 overs); John Simpson 95* (176); Callum Parkinson 3/76 (29 overs)		136 (55.1 overs); Callum Parkinson 41 (103); Martin Andersson 4/27 (11 overs)
218 (82.1 overs); Stephen Eskinazi 46 (112); Chris Wright 6/48 (23.1 overs)		378/5 (123.1 overs); Marcus Harris 185 (311); Ethan Bamber 2/75 (26 overs)

Leicestershire won by 5 wickets
Grace Road, Leicester
Umpires: Mark Newell and Tim Robinson

- Middlesex won the toss and elected to bat.

3–6 June 2021
Scorecard

Somerset	v	Hampshire
360 (83.2 overs); Lewis Gregory 107 (143); Keith Barker 6/72 (24 overs)		311 (104.2 overs); Lewis McManus 91 (161); Josh Davey 5/78 (25.2 overs)
409/7d (103.1 overs); George Bartlett 100 (161); Felix Organ 3/115 (29 overs)		88/2 (33.2 overs); Tom Alsop 23* (68); Lewis Gregory 2/18 (10 overs)

Match drawn
County Ground, Taunton
Umpires: Peter Hartley and Steve O'Shaughnessy

- Hampshire won the toss and elected to field.

3–6 June 2021
Scorecard

Leicestershire	v	Gloucestershire
451 (132 overs); Marcus Harris 148 (236); Josh Shaw 2/55 (16 overs)		158 (50.3 overs); Miles Hammond 67 (107); Callum Parkinson 5/45 (18 overs)
		200 (70 overs) (f/o); Ian Cockbain 59 (136); Callum Parkinson 5/63 (32 overs)

Leicestershire won by an innings and 93 runs
Grace Road, Leicester
Umpires: Nick Cook and Russell Warren

- Leicestershire won the toss and elected to bat.

4–7 July 2021
Scorecard

Hampshire	v	Surrey
488 (134.5 overs); Colin de Grandhomme 174* (213); Jordan Clark 4/110 (33 overs)		72 (31.4 overs); Hashim Amla 29 (65); Keith Barker 4/24 (14 overs)
		122/8 (104.5 overs) (f/o); Hashim Amla 37* (278); Keith Barker 3/9 (22 overs)

Match drawn
Rose Bowl, Southampton
Umpires: Chris Watts and Ian Gould

- Surrey won the toss and elected to field.
- Ben Geddes (Surrey) and Tom Prest (Hampshire) both made their first-class debuts.
- Tom Prest replaced James Vince (Hampshire), while Ben Geddes replaced Will Jacks (Surrey), on day 3 due to international call-ups.

4–7 July 2021
Scorecard

Somerset	v	Leicestershire
461/9d (115 overs); Devon Conway 88 (146); Gavin Griffiths 3/93 (20 overs)		475/7 (152 overs); Harry Swindells 171* (322); Marchant de Lange 3/110 (30 overs)

Match drawn
County Ground, Taunton
Umpires: James Middlebrook and Neil Mallender

- Leicestershire won the toss and elected to field.
- Kasey Aldridge (Somerset) made his first-class debut.
- Kasey Aldridge replaced Craig Overton for Somerset on day 3 due to an international call-up.

5–8 July 2021
Scorecard

Gloucestershire	v	Middlesex
248 (94.1 overs); Miles Hammond 75 (180); Ethan Bamber 3/39 (22 overs)		101 (36 overs); Sam Robson 37 (91); Matthew Taylor 4/19 (9 overs)
272 (72.2 overs); James Bracey 88 (149); Daryl Mitchell 4/42 (10 overs)		255 (127.3 overs); Stephen Eskinazi 102 (300); Matthew Taylor 5/40 (29 overs)

Gloucestershire won by 164 runs
College Ground, Cheltenham
Umpires: Graham Lloyd and Mark Newell

- Middlesex won the toss and elected to field.
- Josh de Caires (Middlesex) and Ollie Price (Gloucestershire) both made their first-class debuts.
- Dominic Goodman replaced David Payne (Gloucestershire), while Robbie White replaced John Simpson (Middlesex), on day 2 due to international call-ups.

11–14 July 2021
Scorecard

Gloucestershire	v	Hampshire
229 (73.4 overs); Glenn Phillips 47 (77); Colin de Grandhomme 4/31 (18 overs)		486/7d (143 overs); Nick Gubbins 137* (248); Ryan Higgins 3/92 (35 overs)
310 (126.1 overs); Tom Lace 118 (241); Mason Crane 3/55 (39 overs)		56/3 (10.3 overs); Ian Holland 19 (25); Daniel Worrall 3/21 (5.3 overs)

Hampshire won by 7 wickets
College Ground, Cheltenham
Umpires: Paul Pollard and Rob White

- Gloucestershire won the toss and elected to bat.

11–14 July 2021
Scorecard

Middlesex	v	Leicestershire
324 (108.4 overs); Sam Robson 154 (277); Will Davis 5/66 (27.4 overs)		228 (86 overs); Colin Ackermann 82 (226); Tim Murtagh 3/49 (20 overs)
196 (77.4 overs); Stephen Eskinazi 66* (184); Callum Parkinson 4/35 (20.4 overs)		171 (61 overs); Josh Inglis 52 (85); Tim Murtagh 4/36 (15.3 overs)

Middlesex won by 121 runs
Merchant Taylors' School Ground, Northwood
Umpires: Ben Debenham and Mark Newell

- Middlesex won the toss and elected to bat.
- Joe Cracknell (Middlesex) made his first-class debut.

11–14 July 2021
Scorecard

Somerset	v	Surrey
429 (148.5 overs); James Hildreth 107 (212); Jordan Clark 3/75 (27 overs)		240 (114.1 overs); Mark Stoneman 67 (167); Jack Leach 6/43 (35.1 overs)
69 (29.1 overs); James Hildreth 14 (20); Ravichandran Ashwin 6/27 (15 overs)		106/4 (41 overs); Jamie Smith 46* (98); Roelof van der Merwe 3/60 (17 overs)

Match drawn
The Oval, London
Umpires: Peter Hartley and Russell Warren

- Somerset won the toss and elected to bat.

==== Group 3 ====
8–11 April 2021
Scorecard

Kent	v	Northamptonshire
445 (128.5 overs); Darren Stevens 116* (134); Nathan Buck 3/84 (24 overs)		434 (123.4 overs); Ricardo Vasconcelos 154 (209); Harry Podmore 4/77 (21.4 overs)
42/1 (13.1 overs); Zak Crawley 19* (34); Ben Sanderson 1/6 (6 overs)

Match drawn
County Cricket Ground, Northampton
Umpires: Paul Pollard and Rob Bailey

- Northamptonshire won the toss and elected to field.

8–11 April 2021
Scorecard

Glamorgan	v	Yorkshire
330 (101.4 overs); Timm van der Gugten 85* (145); Ben Coad 4/94 (26 overs)		193 (58.2 overs); Adam Lyth 52 (70); Callum Taylor 2/16 (4.2 overs)
241/4d (78.4 overs); Billy Root 110* (217); Ben Coad 3/18 (7 overs)		223/4 (66 overs); Adam Lyth 115* (196); Michael Hogan 2/32 (13 overs)

Match drawn
Headingley Cricket Ground, Leeds
Umpires: Paul Baldwin and Russell Warren

- Yorkshire won the toss and elected to field.
- Jamie McIlroy (Glamorgan) made his first-class debut.

8–11 April 2021
Scorecard

Sussex	v	Lancashire
301 (100.4 overs); Tom Haines 155 (263); Tom Bailey 4/48 (22.4 overs)		407 (109.4 overs); Dane Vilas 189 (252); Sean Hunt 3/47 (21 overs)
103/2 (56.3 overs); Aaron Thomason 46* (189); Saqib Mahmood 2/19 (13 overs)

Match drawn
Old Trafford Cricket Ground, Manchester
Umpires: Martin Saggers and Neil Bainton

- Sussex won the toss and elected to bat.
- Sean Hunt (Sussex) made his first-class debut.

15–18 April 2021
Scorecard

Lancashire	v	Northamptonshire
305 (115.2 overs); Josh Bohannon 68 (156); Simon Kerrigan 4/60 (34 overs)		177 (62 overs); Adam Rossington 49 (84); Tom Bailey 3/32 (10 overs)
296/7d (81 overs); Steven Croft 103* (174); Nathan Buck 2/70 (18 overs)		218 (105.3 overs); Luke Procter 93 (294); Luke Wood 3/31 (13 overs)

Lancashire won by 206 runs
Old Trafford Cricket Ground, Manchester
Umpires: Mike Burns and Richard Kettleborough

- Lancashire won the toss and elected to bat.

15–18 April 2021
Scorecard

Yorkshire	v	Kent
379 (105.2 overs); Adam Lyth 97 (116); Darren Stevens 4/60 (19.2 overs)		265 (87.1 overs); Darren Stevens 52 (99); Steven Patterson 3/43 (18 overs)
330/5d (75.2 overs); Adam Lyth 116 (169); Joe Denly 2/61 (13.2 overs)		244 (88.4 overs); Matt Milnes 78 (210); David Willey 5/61 (16.4 overs)

Yorkshire won by 200 runs
St Lawrence Ground, Canterbury
Umpires: Ian Gould and Martin Saggers

- Yorkshire won the toss and elected to bat.

15–18 April 2021
Scorecard

Glamorgan	v	Sussex
285 (75 overs); Kiran Carlson 127* (182); Ollie Robinson 4/50 (18 overs)		481 (123.3 overs); Stiaan van Zyl 113 (153); Michael Hogan 4/46 (23.3 overs)
349 (127.1 overs); Kiran Carlson 132* (198); Ollie Robinson 9/78 (30.1 overs)		154/2 (40.1 overs); Aaron Thomason 78* (118); David Lloyd 1/22 (5 overs)

Sussex won by 8 wickets
Sophia Gardens, Cardiff
Umpires: Alex Wharf and Ben Debenham

- Sussex won the toss and elected to field.

22–25 April 2021
Scorecard

Glamorgan	v	Northamptonshire
407 (113.1 overs); Chris Cooke 136 (227); Gareth Berg 3/69 (25 overs)		364 (105 overs); Adam Rossington 76 (95); James Weighell 2/56 (21 overs)
311/5d (82 overs); Nick Selman 69 (166); Nathan Buck 3/65 (15 overs)		357/3 (72.4 overs); Ricardo Vasconcelos 185* (221); David Lloyd 1/47 (10.4 overs)

Northamptonshire won by 7 wickets
County Cricket Ground, Northampton
Umpires: Peter Hartley and Steve O'Shaughnessy

- Northamptonshire won the toss and elected to field.

22–25 April 2021
Scorecard

Lancashire	v	Kent
525 (167.2 overs); Danny Lamb 125 (232); Darren Stevens 2/44 (26 overs)		169 (50.3 overs); Zak Crawley 60 (65); Tom Bailey 4/46 (15 overs)
		351 (138 overs) (f/o); Daniel Bell-Drummond 114 (219); Matt Parkinson 7/126 (52 overs)

Lancashire won by an innings and 5 runs
St Lawrence Ground, Canterbury
Umpires: Billy Taylor and Nigel Llong

- Kent won the toss and elected to field.
- Danny Lamb (Lancashire) scored his maiden century in first-class cricket.

22–25 April 2021
Scorecard

Yorkshire	v	Sussex
150 (50.5 overs); Adam Lyth 42 (58); George Garton 3/25 (11 overs)		221 (76.3 overs); Tom Haines 86 (142); Steven Patterson 4/26 (12.3 overs)
305 (103.4 overs); Gary Ballance 74 (151); Jack Carson 5/85 (39.4 overs)		186 (69.5 overs); Ben Brown 46 (111); Dom Bess 6/53 (29.5 overs)

Yorkshire won by 48 runs
County Cricket Ground, Hove
Umpires: Ian Blackwell and Paul Pollard

- Yorkshire won the toss and elected to bat.

29 April–2 May 2021
Scorecard

Kent	v	Glamorgan
138 (45.3 overs); Zak Crawley 33 (66); Timm van der Gugten 4/41 (11.3 overs)		197 (61.5 overs); David Lloyd 62 (103); Darren Stevens 5/53 (23 overs)
74 (26.5 overs); Heino Kuhn 14 (18); Michael Hogan 5/28 (10 overs)		19/0 (2.2 overs); David Lloyd 19* (8)

Glamorgan won by 10 wickets
Sophia Gardens, Cardiff
Umpires: Ian Blackwell and Neil Bainton

- Glamorgan won the toss and elected to field.
- Darren Stevens (Kent) took his 30th five-wicket haul in first-class cricket.
- 136.3 overs were bowled in total, making this the shortest four-day County match involving Glamorgan.

29 April–2 May 2021
Scorecard

Sussex	v	Lancashire
328 (102.2 overs); Stiaan van Zyl 79 (145); Danny Lamb 3/59 (23.2 overs)		230 (98.2 overs); Keaton Jennings 60 (151); Jack Carson 4/51 (29 overs)
154 (46.1 overs); Delray Rawlins 45 (78); Tom Bailey 3/28 (10 overs)		255/5 (68.2 overs); Keaton Jennings 91* (194); Jack Carson 3/45 (24 overs)

Lancashire won by 5 wickets
Old Trafford Cricket Ground, Manchester
Umpires: Neil Mallender and Peter Hartley

- Sussex won the toss and elected to bat.
- Jamie Atkins (Sussex) made his first-class debut.

29 April–2 May 2021
Scorecard

Yorkshire	v	Northamptonshire
206 (63.3 overs); Dom Bess 56 (95); Wayne Parnell 5/64 (15.3 overs)		234 (88.5 overs); Saif Zaib 55 (134); Steven Patterson 3/35 (18 overs)
247 (78.4 overs); David Willey 41* (73); Wayne Parnell 5/79 (17.4 overs)		218 (73.5 overs); Ricardo Vasconcelos 41 (62); David Willey 3/39 (18 overs)

Yorkshire won by 1 run
Headingley Cricket Ground, Leeds
Umpires: David Millns and Nick Cook

- Northamptonshire won the toss and elected to field.
- This was the first time that Northamptonshire had lost a first-class match by one run.
- It was the second time that Yorkshire had won a first-class match by one run, after they beat Middlesex by one run in the 1976 County Championship.

6–9 May 2021
Scorecard

Glamorgan	v	Lancashire
344 (109.5 overs); David Lloyd 78 (129); James Anderson 3/40 (24 overs)		301/9d (94.3 overs); Keaton Jennings 64 (174); Andrew Salter 2/49 (13 overs)

Match drawn
Old Trafford Cricket Ground, Manchester
Umpires: Michael Gough and Nick Cook

- Glamorgan won the toss and elected to bat.
- No play was possible on day 3 due to rain.

6–9 May 2021
Scorecard

Sussex	v	Northamptonshire
106 (42.2 overs); Ollie Robinson 49* (92); Gareth Berg 5/18 (13 overs)		441/9d (102 overs); Saif Zaib 135 (202); Ollie Robinson 5/58 (26 overs)
215 (63.2 overs); Stiaan van Zyl 72 (123); Ben Sanderson 5/71 (22 overs)

Northamptonshire won by an innings and 120 runs
County Cricket Ground, Northampton
Umpires: Neil Bainton and Paul Baldwin

- Northamptonshire won the toss and elected to field.
- No play was possible on day 3 due to rain.
- Joe Sarro (Sussex) made his first-class debut.
- Saif Zaib (Northamptonshire) scored his maiden century in first-class cricket.

6–9 May 2021
Scorecard

Kent	v	Yorkshire
305 (111.3 overs); Zak Crawley 90 (171); Ben Coad 3/53 (22 overs)		321 (105.3 overs); Gary Ballance 96 (201); Nathan Gilchrist 4/74 (18 overs)

Match drawn
Headingley Cricket Ground, Leeds
Umpires: Peter Hartley and Richard Kettleborough

- Yorkshire won the toss and elected to field.
- No play was possible on day 3 due to rain.

13–16 May 2021
Scorecard

Kent	v	Sussex
145 (54.3 overs); Jack Leaning 63 (128); Ollie Robinson 3/29 (18 overs)		256 (76.3 overs); Stiaan van Zyl 52 (83); Matt Quinn 4/54 (19.3 overs)
387/4d (111 overs); Jack Leaning 127* (263); Jofra Archer 1/14 (5 overs)

Match drawn
County Cricket Ground, Hove
Umpires: David Millns and Graham Lloyd

- Sussex won the toss and elected to field.
- Tawanda Muyeye (Kent) made his first-class debut.

13–16 May 2021
Scorecard

Glamorgan	v	Yorkshire
149 (53.5 overs); David Lloyd 31 (70); Harry Brook 3/15 (8 overs)		230 (75.3 overs); Joe Root 99 (199); Michael Neser 5/39 (15 overs)
164/4 (40 overs); Kiran Carlson 88* (84); Ben Coad 2/16 (9 overs)

Match drawn
Sophia Gardens, Cardiff
Umpires: Martin Saggers and Nigel Llong

- Yorkshire won the toss and elected to field.
- No play was possible on day 1 due to rain.
- Harry Duke (Yorkshire) made his first-class debut.

20–23 May 2021
Scorecard

Lancashire	v	Northamptonshire
88/1 (34.3 overs); Alex Davies 51* (105); Gareth Berg 1/28 (13 overs)

Match drawn
County Cricket Ground, Northampton
Umpires: Richard Kettleborough and Rob Bailey

- Northamptonshire won the toss and elected to field.
- Only 16.5 overs of play were possible on day 1 due to rain.
- No play was possible on day 2 due to rain.
- Only 11 overs of play were possible on day 3 due to rain.

20–23 May 2021
Scorecard

Kent	v	Glamorgan
307 (76.2 overs); Darren Stevens 190 (149); Timm van der Gugten 4/34 (19 overs)		64/3d (26 overs); Billy Root 26* (59); Matt Quinn 2/10 (10 overs)
60/1d (10 overs); Jordan Cox 27* (27); Michael Neser 1/28 (4 overs)		23/1 (7 overs); David Lloyd 17 (14); Matt Quinn 1/14 (4 overs)

Match drawn
St Lawrence Ground, Canterbury
Umpires: James Middlebrook and Richard Illingworth

- Glamorgan won the toss and elected to field.
- Only 22 overs of play were possible on day 1 due to rain.

27–30 May 2021
Scorecard

Yorkshire	v	Lancashire
159 (64.1 overs); Harry Duke 52 (120); Tom Bailey 3/6 (14 overs)		509/9d (173.4 overs); Josh Bohannon 127* (277); Jordan Thompson 3/86 (25 overs)
271 (136.2 overs); Harry Brook 52 (116); Saqib Mahmood 5/47 (26 overs)

Lancashire won by an innings and 79 runs
Old Trafford Cricket Ground, Manchester
Umpires: Alex Wharf and Steve O'Shaughnessy

- Yorkshire won the toss and elected to bat.
- Saqib Mahmood (Lancashire) took his maiden five-wicket haul in first-class cricket.

27–30 May 2021
Scorecard

Sussex	v	Northamptonshire
175 (59.3 overs); Jack Carson 52 (106); Ben Sanderson 3/45 (18 overs)		256 (81.5 overs); Saif Zaib 64 (123); George Garton 4/69 (14.5 overs)
298 (99.1 overs); Tom Haines 103 (221); Simon Kerrigan 5/70 (34.1 overs)		218/3 (61.4 overs); Rob Keogh 60* (112); Jamie Atkins 2/39 (16 overs)

Northamptonshire won by 7 wickets
County Cricket Ground, Hove
Umpires: Nigel Llong and Paul Baldwin

- Sussex won the toss and elected to bat.

3–6 June 2021
Scorecard

Lancashire	v	Glamorgan
173 (56.1 overs); Luke Wood 28 (39); Michael Neser 3/46 (15 overs)		150 (39.2 overs); Marnus Labuschagne 44 (55); Saqib Mahmood 3/34 (11.2 overs)
164 (51.1 overs); Alex Davies 47 (79); Michael Neser 4/53 (13 overs)		188/4 (58.1 overs); Marnus Labuschagne 63* (72); Matt Parkinson 1/22 (6 overs)

Glamorgan won by 6 wickets
Sophia Gardens, Cardiff
Umpires: Alex Wharf and Paul Baldwin

- Glamorgan won the toss and elected to field.

3–6 June 2021
Scorecard

Sussex	v	Yorkshire
313 (115.3 overs); Ben Brown 127 (177); Jordan Thompson 3/53 (24 overs)		558 (145 overs); Dawid Malan 199 (289); Jamie Atkins 5/98 (26 overs)
215 (113.4 overs); Ali Orr 67 (216); Dom Bess 4/51 (35 overs)

Yorkshire won by an innings and 30 runs
Headingley Cricket Ground, Leeds
Umpires: Graham Lloyd and Rob Bailey

- Yorkshire won the toss and elected to field.
- Danial Ibrahim and Ali Orr (Sussex) both made their first-class debuts.
- Danial Ibrahim (Sussex), at the age of 16 years and 299 days, became the youngest cricketer to score a half-century in the history of the County Championship.

3–6 June 2021
Scorecard

Northamptonshire	v	Kent
392 (104.4 overs); Emilio Gay 101 (160); Darren Stevens 5/73 (26.4 overs)		330/5d (69 overs); Ollie Robinson 120 (119); Simon Kerrigan 2/80 (14 overs)
184/8d (69 overs); Adam Rossington 59* (124); Nathan Gilchrist 3/57 (15 overs)

Match drawn
St Lawrence Ground, Canterbury
Umpires: Ian Gould and Ian Ramage

- Northamptonshire won the toss and elected to bat.
- No play was possible on day 2 due to rain.
- Emilio Gay (Northamptonshire) scored his maiden century in first-class cricket.

4–7 July 2021
Scorecard

Sussex	v	Glamorgan
226 (75.3 overs); Danial Ibrahim 58 (147); Timm van der Gugten 3/45 (21 overs)		215 (64.5 overs); David Lloyd 38 (62); Jack Carson 3/39 (16.5 overs)
263/6d (79 overs); Ben Brown 100* (134); Timm van der Gugten 3/94 (23 overs)		154/5 (50.2 overs); Colin Ingram 27 (44); Jack Carson 3/61 (20.2 overs)

Match drawn
County Cricket Ground, Hove
Umpires: Ben Debenham and Russell Warren

- Sussex won the toss and elected to bat.
- Oli Carter (Sussex) made his first-class debut.

4–7 July 2021
Scorecard

Kent	v	Lancashire
74 (26.2 overs); Darren Stevens 19 (24); James Anderson 7/19 (10 overs)		259/9d (91 overs); Luke Wood 63* (133); Matt Quinn 3/37 (15 overs)
149/8 (49 overs); Jack Leaning 53* (199); Tom Hartley 4/42 (30 overs)

Match drawn
Old Trafford Cricket Ground, Manchester
Umpires: Rob White and Steve O'Shaughnessy

- Kent won the toss and elected to bat.
- No play was possible on day 1 due to rain.
- Tawanda Muyeye replaced Zak Crawley (Kent), while Tom Hartley replaced Matt Parkinson (Lancashire), on day 3 due to international call-ups.

4–7 July 2021
Scorecard

Yorkshire	v	Northamptonshire
158 (64.3 overs); George Hill 71 (170); Rob Keogh 2/8 (7 overs)		170 (61.4 overs); Ricardo Vasconcelos 55 (98); Dom Bess 7/43 (24.4 overs)
217 (83.2 overs); Harry Brook 113 (178); Simon Kerrigan 5/39 (30.2 overs)		152 (52 overs); Luke Procter 42* (111); Duanne Olivier 3/34 (8 overs)

Yorkshire won by 53 runs
County Cricket Ground, Northampton
Umpires: Billy Taylor and Tom Lungley

- Yorkshire won the toss and elected to bat.

11–14 July 2021
Scorecard

Glamorgan	v	Northamptonshire
215 (77.3 overs); Saif Zaib 50 (95); Andrew Salter 4/18 (10.3 overs)		462/4d (113 overs); Kiran Carlson 170* (227); Luke Procter 3/77 (20 overs)
250/5 (92.4 overs); Rob Keogh 71* (137); Michael Neser 3/52 (20 overs)

Match drawn
Sophia Gardens, Cardiff
Umpires: Graham Lloyd and Tom Lungley

- Northamptonshire won the toss and elected to field.

11–14 July 2021
Scorecard

Sussex	v	Kent
181 (57.5 overs); James Coles 36 (60); Jas Singh 4/51 (11 overs)		165 (51.5 overs); Harry Podmore 37 (84); Jamie Atkins 5/51 (14 overs)
332/4d (99 overs); Ali Orr 119 (254); Matt Quinn 3/188 (24 overs)		275/7 (85.4 overs); Harry Finch 115 (212); Jack Carson 3/87 (32.4 overs)

Match drawn
St Lawrence Ground, Canterbury
Umpires: Billy Taylor and Hassan Adnan

- Kent won the toss and elected to field.
- Joe Gordon, Harry Houillon, Dan Lincoln, Jas Singh and Bailey Wightman (Kent) and Harrison Ward (Sussex) all made their first-class debuts.
- Bailey Wightman replaced Nathan Gilchrist (Kent) as a COVID-19 replacement on Day 2.
- Ali Orr (Sussex) scored his maiden century in first-class cricket.

11–14 July 2021
Scorecard

Lancashire	v	Yorkshire
411/2 (119.2 overs); Keaton Jennings 132 (253); Jordan Thompson 2/76 (20 overs)

Match drawn
Headingley Cricket Ground, Leeds
Umpires: Ian Gould and Nigel Llong

- Yorkshire won the toss and elected to field.
- No play was possible on day 2 due to rain.
- Play was suspended on day 3 due to an unsafe outfield, with the match abandoned the following day.

=== Standings ===
Teams receive 16 points for a win and 8 for a draw or tie. Bonus points (a maximum of 5 batting points and 3 bowling points) could be scored during the first 110 overs of each team's first innings.

==== Group 1 ====
Team	Pld	W	L	T	D	A	Bat	Bowl	Ded	PCF	Pts	Qualification
Nottinghamshire	10	4	2	0	4	0	26	29	0	0	151	Qualification for Division One of the Division Stage
Warwickshire (Note: Warwickshire were deducted 1 point for a slow over rate against Derbyshire on 3 June 2021.)	10	4	1	0	5	0	17	25	1	0	145	Qualification for Division One of the Division Stage
Durham (Note: Durham were deducted 2 points for a slow over rate against Warwickshire on 4 July 2021, and 1 point for a slow over rate against Nottinghamshire on 11 July 2021.)	10	3	2	0	5	0	17	30	3	0	132	Qualification for Division Two of the Division Stage
Essex	10	3	2	0	5	0	15	26	0	0	129	Qualification for Division Two of the Division Stage
Worcestershire	10	1	3	0	6	0	24	21	0	0	109	Qualification for Division Three of the Division Stage
Derbyshire (Note: Derbyshire were deducted 1 point for a slow over rate against Warwickshire on 3 June 2021.)	10	0	5	0	5	0	10	23	1	0	72	Qualification for Division Three of the Division Stage

Source: BBC Sport, ESPNcricinfo, ECB

==== Group 2 ====
Team	Pld	W	L	T	D	A	Bat	Bowl	Ded	PCF	Pts	Qualification
Somerset (Note: Somerset were deducted 8 points for a poor pitch against Essex in 2019.)	10	4	1	0	5	0	26	26	8	0	148	Qualification for Division One of the Division Stage
Hampshire	10	4	2	0	4	0	23	26	0	0	145	Qualification for Division One of the Division Stage
Gloucestershire	10	5	3	0	2	0	14	21	0	0	131	Qualification for Division Two of the Division Stage
Surrey	10	2	2	0	6	0	19	24	0	0	123	Qualification for Division Two of the Division Stage
Leicestershire	10	2	4	0	4	0	22	25	0	0	111	Qualification for Division Three of the Division Stage
Middlesex (Note: Middlesex were deducted 1 point for a slow over rate against Leicestershire on 11 July 2021.)	10	2	7	0	1	0	15	30	1	0	84	Qualification for Division Three of the Division Stage

Source: BBC Sport, ESPNcricinfo, ECB

==== Group 3 ====
Team	Pld	W	L	T	D	A	Bat	Bowl	Ded	PCF	Pts	Qualification
Lancashire	10	4	1	0	5	0	22	24	0	0	150	Qualification for Division One of the Division Stage
Yorkshire	10	5	1	0	4	0	14	23	0	0	149	Qualification for Division One of the Division Stage
Glamorgan	10	2	2	0	6	0	18	29	0	0	127	Qualification for Division Two of the Division Stage
Northamptonshire	10	3	3	0	4	0	22	21	0	0	123	Qualification for Division Two of the Division Stage
Kent	10	0	3	0	7	0	15	26	0	0	97	Qualification for Division Three of the Division Stage
Sussex	10	1	5	0	4	0	18	28	0	0	94	Qualification for Division Three of the Division Stage

Source: BBC Sport, ESPNcricinfo, ECB

== Qualification ==
=== Teams ===
The teams qualified into the following divisions for the Division Stage:

- Division One: Hampshire, Lancashire, Nottinghamshire, Somerset, Warwickshire, Yorkshire
- Division Two: Durham, Essex, Glamorgan, Gloucestershire, Northamptonshire, Surrey
- Division Three: Derbyshire, Kent, Leicestershire, Middlesex, Sussex, Worcestershire

==== Points carried forward ====
Each county played four games in the Division stage. They did not play against the team in their Division that was in their Group for the group stage. Instead, they carried forward into the Division stage half the total points they scored in the two matches played against that team in the group stage, that is, the average points they scored from their two matches against that opponent.

Division One
Group	Team	Team from the same group	Points scored against during		PCF	Match Ref.
Group	Team	Team from the same group	1st group match	2nd group match	PCF	Match Ref.
1	Nottinghamshire	Warwickshire	5	5	5	15–18 Apr 2021; 27–30 May 2021
1	Warwickshire	Nottinghamshire	20	22	21	15–18 Apr 2021; 27–30 May 2021
2	Somerset	Hampshire	22	15	18.5	6–9 May 2021; 3–6 July 2021
2	Hampshire	Somerset	3	14	8.5	6–9 May 2021; 3–6 July 2021
3	Lancashire	Yorkshire	22	11	16.5	27–30 May 2021; 11–14 July 2021
3	Yorkshire	Lancashire	1	8	4.5	27–30 May 2021; 11–14 July 2021

Division Two
Group	Team	Team from the same group	Points scored against during		PCF	Match Ref.
Group	Team	Team from the same group	1st group match	2nd group match	PCF	Match Ref.
1	Durham	Essex	5	3	4	15–18 Apr 2021; 27–30 May 2021
1	Essex	Durham	19	19	19	15–18 Apr 2021; 27–30 May 2021
2	Gloucestershire	Surrey	22	2	12	8–11 Apr 2021; 27–30 May 2021
2	Surrey	Gloucestershire	4	22	13	8–11 Apr 2021; 27–30 May 2021
3	Glamorgan	Northamptonshire	7	16	11.5	22–25 Apr 2021; 11–14 July 2021
3	Northamptonshire	Glamorgan	22	10	16	22–25 Apr 2021; 11–14 July 2021

Division Three
Group	Team	Team from the same group	Points scored against during		PCF	Match Ref.
Group	Team	Team from the same group	1st group match	2nd group match	PCF	Match Ref.
1	Worcestershire	Derbyshire	14	23	18.5	15–18 Apr 2021; 27–30 May 2021
1	Derbyshire	Worcestershire	15	4	9.5	15–18 Apr 2021; 27–30 May 2021
2	Leicestershire	Middlesex	19	4	11.5	27–30 May 2021; 11–14 Jul 2021
2	Middlesex	Leicestershire	5	21	13	27–30 May 2021; 11–14 Jul 2021
3	Kent	Sussex	11	11	11	13–16 May 2021; 11–14 July 2021
3	Sussex	Kent	13	11	12	13–16 May 2021; 11–14 July 2021

== Division stage ==
=== Fixtures ===
==== Division One ====
30 August–2 September 2021
Round 1
Scorecard

Yorkshire	v	Hampshire
243 (106.1 overs); Dom Bess 54 (105); Kyle Abbott 3/47 (20 overs)		163 (62.3 overs); James Vince 49 (90); Ben Coad 3/29 (12.3 overs)
312/6d (87 overs); Gary Ballance 101* (86); Keith Barker 2/39 (18 overs)		177/9 (115 overs); Joe Weatherley 43 (137); Jordan Thompson 4/18 (17 overs)

Match drawn
Rose Bowl, Southampton
Umpires: Nigel Llong and James Middlebrook

- Hampshire won the toss and elected to field.

30 August–2 September 2021
Round 1
Scorecard

Warwickshire	v	Lancashire
371 (139.1 overs); Chris Benjamin 127 (245); Saqib Mahmood 4/77 (28.1 overs)		341 (118.3 overs); Josh Bohannon 170 (334); Liam Norwell 6/57 (20.3 overs)
239/6d (100 overs); Dom Sibley 57 (168); Matt Parkinson 4/94 (45 overs)

Match drawn
Old Trafford, Manchester
Umpires: Ian Blackwell and Russell Warren

- Warwickshire won the toss and elected to bat.
- Chris Benjamin (Warwickshire) scored his maiden century in first-class cricket.

30 August–2 September 2021
Round 1
Scorecard

Nottinghamshire	v	Somerset
448 (142.1 overs); Liam Patterson-White 101 (121); Tom Abell 3/84 (25 overs)		107 (38.5 overs); Tom Abell 35 (63); Luke Fletcher 4/21 (11 overs)
		181 (66.3 overs) (f/o); Marchant de Lange 36 (29); Dane Paterson 4/46 (16 overs)

Nottinghamshire won by an innings and 160 runs
County Ground, Taunton
Umpires: David Millns and Paul Pollard

- Somerset won the toss and elected to field.
- Liam Patterson-White (Nottinghamshire) scored his maiden century in first-class cricket.

5–8 September 2021
Round 2
Scorecard

Nottinghamshire	v	Lancashire
272 (82.2 overs); Sam Northeast 65 (136); Tom Bailey 4/48 (19.2 overs)		168 (52.3 overs); Josh Bohannon 35 (48); Brett Hutton 5/62 (19 overs)
339/8d (107 overs); Tom Moores 97 (154); Tom Bailey 3/84 (25 overs)		341 (39 overs); George Balderson 77 (235); Dane Paterson 4/78 (32 overs)

Nottinghamshire won by 102 runs
Trent Bridge, Nottingham
Umpires: Nick Cook and Peter Hartley

- Lancashire won the toss and elected to field.

5–8 September 2021
Round 2
Scorecard

Hampshire	v	Warwickshire
89 (28.1 overs); Ian Holland 28 (46); Will Rhodes 5/23 (8 overs)		116 (46 overs); Sam Hain 41 (102); Mohammad Abbas 5/29 (18 overs)
322 (133.4 overs); Keith Barker 75 (192); Liam Norwell 4/72 (28 overs)		235 (108.4 overs); Rob Yates 77 (229); Liam Dawson 3/42 (24 overs)

Hampshire won by 60 runs
Edgbaston, Birmingham
Umpires: Ian Gould and James Middlebrook

- Warwickshire won the toss and elected to field.

5–8 September 2021
Round 2
Scorecard

Somerset	v	Yorkshire
134 (42 overs); James Hildreth 24 (54); Matthew Fisher 5/41 (11 overs)		308 (103.3 overs); Harry Brook 118 (165); Marchant de Lange 4/55 (25.3 overs)
141 (51.5 overs); Ben Green 32 (77); Matthew Fisher 4/23 (9 overs)

Yorkshire won by an innings and 33 runs
North Marine Road, Scarborough
Umpires: Rob White and Tim Robinson

- Somerset won the toss and elected to bat.

12–15 September 2021
Round 3
Scorecard

Hampshire	v	Nottinghamshire
226 (82.2 overs); Nick Gubbins 54 (116); Brett Hutton 3/40 (18 overs)		155 (52.1 overs); Ben Slater 55 (103); Keith Barker 7/46 (20 overs)
178 (65.4 overs); James Vince 52 (104); Liam Patterson-White 5/41 (15.4 overs)		127 (54.3 overs); Ben Duckett 33 (45); Liam Dawson 5/45 (17.3 overs)

Hampshire won by 122 runs
Rose Bowl, Southampton
Umpires: Mike Burns and Martin Saggers

- Hampshire won the toss and elected to bat.

12–15 September 2021
Round 3
Scorecard

Lancashire	v	Somerset
373 (99.3 overs); Luke Wells 103 (113); Jack Brooks 4/77 (22 overs)		90 (38.2 overs); Azhar Ali 39 (105); Jack Blatherwick 4/28 (10 overs)
32/0 (6 overs); Alex Davies 22* (20)		314 (72.1 overs) (f/o); Tom Lammonby 100 (103); Luke Wells 3/8 (7 overs)

Lancashire won by 10 wickets
County Ground, Taunton
Umpires: Graham Lloyd and Steve O'Shaughnessy

- Somerset won the toss and elected to field.
- Ned Leonard (Somerset) made his first-class debut.

12–15 September 2021
Round 3
Scorecard

Warwickshire	v	Yorkshire
155 (42.4 overs); Michael Burgess 66 (90); Steven Patterson 4/34 (14 overs)		108 (42.5 overs); Gary Ballance 58 (106); Liam Norwell 4/27 (14 overs)
176 (61.4 overs); Dom Sibley 45 (117); Jordan Thompson 5/52 (15.4 overs)		117 (49.3 overs); Gary Ballance 21 (47); Chris Woakes 3/26 (14 overs)

Warwickshire won by 106 runs
Headingley, Leeds
Umpires: Nigel Llong and Neil Mallender

- Yorkshire won the toss and elected to field.
- No play was possible on day 3 due to rain.
- Jacob Bethell (Warwickshire) made his first-class debut.

21–24 September 2021
Round 4
Scorecard

Hampshire	v	Lancashire
143 (73.2 overs); Mason Crane 25 (101); Matt Parkinson 3/9 (11.2 overs)		141 (54 overs); Steven Croft 40 (56); Mohammad Abbas 5/48 (22 overs)
193 (74.2 overs); James Vince 69 (132); Tom Bailey 7/37 (24 overs)		198/9 (66.2 overs); Dane Vilas 47* (87); Mason Crane 5/41 (16 overs)

Lancashire won by 1 wicket
Liverpool CC, Liverpool
Umpires: Alex Wharf and Peter Hartley

- Lancashire won the toss and elected to field.

21–24 September 2021
Round 4
Scorecard

Nottinghamshire	v	Yorkshire
296 (97.3 overs); Joe Clarke 109 (204); Ben Coad 3/75 (25 overs)		73 (29.2 overs); Jordan Thompson 16 (10); Joey Evison 4/13 (7 overs)
174/5 (48 overs); Ben Slater 79* (132); Ben Coad 3/58 (17 overs)		396 (142.2 overs) (f/o); Adam Lyth 153 (381); Dane Paterson 3/39 (21.2 overs)

Nottinghamshire won by 5 wickets
Trent Bridge, Nottingham
Umpires: Rob Bailey and Richard Kettleborough

- Yorkshire won the toss and elected to field.

21–24 September 2021
Round 4
Scorecard

Warwickshire	v	Somerset
367 (112.5 overs); Sam Hain 83* (161); Craig Overton 5/88 (30.5 overs)		389 (136.3 overs); Lewis Gregory 68 (139); Tim Bresnan 3/35 (20 overs)
294/3d (51 overs); Rob Yates 132* (168); Josh Davey 1/55 (9 overs)		154 (52 overs); Lewis Goldsworthy 31 (44); Craig Miles 3/26 (9 overs)

Warwickshire won by 118 runs
Edgbaston, Birmingham
Umpires: Steve O'Shaughnessy and Russell Warren

- Somerset won the toss and elected to field.

==== Division Two ====
30 August–2 September 2021
Round 1
Scorecard

Durham	v	Surrey

Match cancelled
Riverside Ground, Chester-le-Street

- The match was cancelled due to COVID-19.

30 August–2 September 2021
Round 1
Scorecard

Glamorgan	v	Essex
134 (44.5 overs); Dan Douthwaite 39 (69); Shane Snater 6/39 (11.5 overs)		320 (101.2 overs); Nick Browne 102 (223); Steven Reingold 3/15 (6 overs)
112 (33.5 overs); Chris Cooke 47* (73); Sam Cook 5/37 (10.5 overs)

Essex won by an innings and 74 runs
Sophia Gardens, Cardiff
Umpires: Ben Debenham and Tim Robinson

- Glamorgan won the toss and elected to bat.
- Josh Rymell (Essex) made his first-class debut.

30 August–2 September 2021
Round 1
Scorecard

Northamptonshire	v	Gloucestershire
327 (98.3 overs); Adam Rossington 94 (134); Tom Price 4/72 (20 overs)		191 (90.5 overs); Graeme van Buuren 56 (132); Luke Procter 5/42 (18.5 overs)
129 (38.1 overs); Simon Kerrigan 27 (32); Ryan Higgins 5/46 (14.1 overs)		267/4 (80.4 overs); Miles Hammond 94 (211); Tom Taylor 2/41 (13 overs)

Gloucestershire won by 6 wickets
Bristol County Ground, Bristol
Umpires: Steve O'Shaughnessy and Ian Ramage

- Gloucestershire won the toss and elected to field.

5–8 September 2021
Round 2
Scorecard

Glamorgan	v	Durham
97 (32 overs); Hamish Rutherford 43 (43); Paul Coughlin 4/11 (5 overs)		503/8d (131.1 overs); Michael Jones 81 (157); Michael Hogan 3/80 (28 overs)
364 (130 overs); Dan Douthwaite 96 (185); Paul Coughlin 5/64 (23 overs)

Durham won by an innings and 42 runs
Riverside Ground, Chester-le-Street
Umpires: Ian Blackwell and Neil Pratt

- Durham won the toss and elected to field.

5–8 September 2021
Round 2
Scorecard

Gloucestershire	v	Essex
76 (28 overs); Ryan Higgins 25 (60); Jamie Porter 4/32 (10 overs)		276 (102.4 overs); Paul Walter 96 (241); David Payne 3/71 (22 overs)
197 (90.1 overs); James Bracey 50 (122); Simon Harmer 4/78 (40 overs)

Essex won by an innings and 3 runs
County Cricket Ground, Chelmsford
Umpires: Neil Bainton and Tom Lungley

- Essex won the toss and elected to field.

5–8 September 2021
Round 2
Scorecard

Surrey	v	Northamptonshire
252 (90.3 overs); Jamie Smith 123 (265); Tom Taylor 5/41 (19 overs)		171 (58.5 overs); Saif Zaib 37 (88); Rikki Clarke 3/34 (15 overs)
238 (104.3 overs); Will Jacks 50 (115); Simon Kerrigan 4/36 (29.2 overs)		322/8 (99.1 overs); Rob Keogh 99 (127); Jordan Clark 5/76 (26 overs)

Northamptonshire won by 2 wickets
County Cricket Ground, Northampton
Umpires: Mark Newell and Russell Warren

- Surrey won the toss and elected to bat.
- James Sales (Northamptonshire) made his first-class debut.

12–15 September 2021
Round 3
Scorecard

Glamorgan	v	Gloucestershire
309 (107.3 overs); Eddie Byrom 78 (210); Tom Price 3/44 (18 overs)		419 (140.4 overs); Chris Dent 75 (153); Michael Hogan 3/49 (27.4 overs)
124 (42 overs); Andrew Salter 19 (35); Zafar Gohar 6/43 (18 overs)		15/0 (1.3 overs); Chris Dent 11* (6)

Gloucestershire won by 10 wickets
Sophia Gardens, Cardiff
Umpires: Ian Blackwell and Neil Pratt

- Gloucestershire won the toss and elected to field.
- Ben Wells (Gloucestershire) made his first-class debut.

12–15 September 2021
Round 3
Scorecard

Northamptonshire	v	Durham
183 (55.3 overs); Luke Procter 76 (136); Matty Potts 4/42 (12 overs)		400 (130 overs); Liam Trevaskis 77* (100); Ben Sanderson 4/41 (24 overs)
231/9 (97 overs); James Sales 53 (120); Matty Potts 4/68 (20 overs)

Match drawn
County Cricket Ground, Northampton
Umpires: Ben Debenham and Peter Hartley

- Northamptonshire won the toss and elected to bat.
- No play was possible on day 3 due to rain.

12–15 September 2021
Round 3
Scorecard

Essex	v	Surrey
439 (143.1 overs); Alastair Cook 165 (330); James Taylor 2/44 (15.1 overs)		161 (86.3 overs); Hashim Amla 84 (209); Jamie Porter 3/27 (18.3 overs)
		113/2 (36 overs) (f/o); Hashim Amla 34* (72); Shane Snater 1/19 (9 overs)

Match drawn
The Oval, London
Umpires: Paul Baldwin and Billy Taylor

- Essex won the toss and elected to bat.
- No play was possible on day 3 due to rain.

21–24 September 2021
Round 4
Scorecard

Northamptonshire	v	Essex
81 (34.5 overs); Emilio Gay 38 (74); Sam Cook 5/21 (12 overs)		170 (43.2 overs); Adam Wheater 34 (38); Jack White 4/40 (14 overs)
45 (18.2 overs); Luke Procter 24 (56); Sam Cook 5/20 (8.2 overs)

Essex won by an innings and 44 runs
County Cricket Ground, Chelmsford
Umpires: Martin Saggers and Neil Mallender

- Northamptonshire won the toss and elected to bat.

21–24 September 2021
Round 4
Scorecard

Durham	v	Gloucestershire
140 (45.5 overs); Alex Lees 40 (60); Zafar Gohar 5/50 (15.5 overs)		218 (74.4 overs); Graeme van Buuren 62 (77); Liam Trevaskis 5/78 (33 overs)
131 (52.4 overs); Ben Raine 38* (72); Zafar Gohar 6/51 (23 overs)		54/3 (9.1 overs); Chris Dent 22 (22); Chris Rushworth 2/26 (5 overs)

Gloucestershire won by 7 wickets
Bristol County Ground, Bristol
Umpires: Graham Lloyd and Ben Debenham

- Durham won the toss and elected to bat.

21–24 September 2021
Round 4
Scorecard

Glamorgan	v	Surrey
672/6d (177 overs); Chris Cooke 205* (299); Amar Virdi 3/140 (39 overs)		722/4d (196 overs); Ollie Pope 274 (345); Eddie Byrom 2/64 (16 overs)

Match drawn
The Oval, London
Umpires: Ian Blackwell and Nigel Llong

- Glamorgan won the toss and elected to bat.
- Chris Cooke (Glamorgan) scored his maiden double century in first-class cricket.

==== Division Three ====
30 August–2 September 2021
Round 1
Scorecard

Kent	v	Leicestershire
232 (70 overs); Jack Leaning 75* (161); Callum Parkinson 4/68 (28 overs)		109 (44.1 overs); Ed Barnes 22* (27); James Logan 3/8 (8.1 overs)
262 (61 overs); Darren Stevens 107* (70); Callum Parkinson 5/75 (23 overs)		253 (51.2 overs); Ed Barnes 70* (74); Matt Milnes 6/53 (12 overs)

Kent won by 132 runs
Grace Road, Leicester
Umpires: Ian Gould and Chris Watts

- Kent won the toss and elected to bat.

30 August–2 September 2021
Round 1
Scorecard

Middlesex	v	Derbyshire
282 (88.2 overs); Robbie White 120 (240); Sam Conners 3/65 (18 overs)		205 (61.5 overs); Leus du Plooy 90 (115); Ethan Bamber 5/41 (15.5 overs)
256 (64.3 overs); Sam Robson 52 (61); Alex Thomson 3/71 (17 overs)		221 (81.2 overs); Billy Godleman 70 (156); Toby Roland-Jones 5/36 (16.2 overs)

Middlesex won by 112 runs
Lord's, London
Umpires: Hassan Adnan and Peter Hartley

- Middlesex won the toss and elected to bat.
- Robbie White (Middlesex) scored his maiden century in first-class cricket.

30 August–2 September 2021
Round 1
Scorecard

Sussex	v	Worcestershire
264 (82.4 overs); Jack Carson 87 (113); Joe Leach 5/68 (22.4 overs)		213 (64 overs); Jack Haynes 47 (71); Henry Crocombe 3/44 (16 overs)
263 (84.5 overs); Danial Ibrahim 94 (172); Joe Leach 4/68 (21.5 overs)		315/4 (74.2 overs); Jake Libby 125* (224); Henry Crocombe 2/39 (9 overs)

Worcestershire won by 6 wickets
New Road, Worcester
Umpires: Neil Bainton and Neil Pratt

- Sussex won the toss and elected to bat.
- Archie Lenham (Sussex) made his first-class debut.

5–8 September 2021
Round 2
Scorecard

Leicestershire	v	Derbyshire
528 (96 overs); Lewis Hill 113 (174); Ben Aitchison 3/71 (28 overs)		340 (130.5 overs); Brooke Guest 116 (275); Ben Mike 3/88 (21 overs)
		203/3 (62.3 overs) (f/o); Billy Godleman 100* (183); Chris Wright 3/36 (9 overs)

Match drawn
County Cricket Ground, Derby
Umpires: Rob Bailey and Ian Ramage

- Leicestershire won the toss and elected to bat.
- Chris Wright (Leicestershire) took his 500th first-class wicket.
- Brooke Guest and Anuj Dal (Derbyshire) both scored their maiden centuries in first-class cricket.

5–8 September 2021
Round 2
Scorecard

Worcestershire	v	Kent
133 (39.4 overs); Ben Cox 41* (72); Nathan Gilchrist 5/38 (11.4 overs)		393 (114.2 overs); Jack Leaning 97 (259); Dillon Pennington 4/80 (24 overs)
204 (60.5 overs); Joe Leach 49* (54); Nathan Gilchrist 3/36 (13.5 overs)

Kent won by an innings and 56 runs
St Lawrence Ground, Canterbury
Umpires: Hassan Adnan and Paul Pollard

- Kent won the toss and elected to field.
- Nathan Gilchrist (Kent) took his maiden five-wicket haul in first-class cricket.
- Sam Billings replaced Marcus O'Riordan for Kent ahead of Day 2.

6–9 September 2021
Round 2
Scorecard

Middlesex	v	Sussex
676/5d (161 overs); Sam Robson 253 (356); Jack Carson 2/183 (46 overs)		319 (95.4 overs); Tom Haines 156 (255); Luke Hollman 5/65 (20 overs)
		303 (89.2 overs) (f/o); Tom Haines 87 (170); Luke Hollman 5/90 (28 overs)

Middlesex won by an innings and 54 runs
County Cricket Ground, Hove
Umpires: Nigel Llong and Chris Watts

- Middlesex won the toss and elected to bat.
- Luke Hollman (Middlesex) took his maiden five-wicket haul in first-class cricket.

12–15 September 2021
Round 3
Scorecard

Kent	v	Derbyshire
285 (91.5 overs); Jack Leaning 82* (167); Ben Aitchison 4/83 (20.5 overs)		156 (43.3 overs); Sam Conners 39 (28); Grant Stewart 5/23 (13 overs)
211/2d (50 overs); Jordan Cox 81 (138); Matt Critchley 1/48 (9 overs)		210 (58.5 overs); Anuj Dal 58* (98); Nathan Gilchrist 4/30 (10.5 overs)

Kent won by 130 runs
County Cricket Ground, Derby
Umpires: Nick Cook and Tom Lungley

- Derbyshire won the toss and elected to field.
- No play was possible on day 3 due to rain.

12–15 September 2021
Round 3
Scorecard

Sussex	v	Leicestershire
359 (107.4 overs); Ben Brown 133* (234); Chris Wright 6/94 (29 overs)		492/4d (102 overs); Hassan Azad 152 (260); Henry Crocombe 2/70 (21 overs)
128 (45.2 overs); Ali Orr 34 (35); Callum Parkinson 4/18 (14.2 overs)

Leicestershire won by an innings and 5 runs
Grace Road, Leicester
Umpires: Mark Newell and Tim Robinson

- Sussex won the toss and elected to bat.
- No play was possible on day 3 due to rain.
- Tom Hinley (Sussex) made his first-class debut.

12–15 September 2021
Round 3
Scorecard

Middlesex	v	Worcestershire
144 (51 overs); Max Holden 52 (94); Ed Barnard 4/43 (15 overs)		171 (43.4 overs); Josh Baker 61* (51); Tim Murtagh 5/64 (17 overs)
247 (93.4 overs); John Simpson 59* (144); Charlie Morris 6/52 (22.4 overs)		119 (35.3 overs); Gareth Roderick 42 (77); Ethan Bamber 4/28 (11.3 overs)

Middlesex won by 101 runs
Lord's, London
Umpires: Neil Bainton and Rob White

- Worcestershire won the toss and elected to field.
- No play was possible on day 3 due to rain.

21–24 September 2021
Round 4
Scorecard

Middlesex	v	Kent
147 (60.5 overs); Mark Stoneman 59 (130); Darren Stevens 4/21 (15 overs)		138 (54.4 overs); Tawanda Muyeye 30 (46); Ethan Bamber 3/36 (19 overs)
363 (86.4 overs); Mark Stoneman 109 (148); Matt Milnes 5/87 (19.4 overs)		375/8 (105.2 overs); Ollie Robinson 112 (163); Tim Murtagh 2/45 (25 overs)

Kent won by 2 wickets
St Lawrence Ground, Canterbury
Umpires: Billy Taylor and Mike Burns

- Kent won the toss and elected to field.

21–24 September 2021
Round 4
Scorecard

Derbyshire	v	Sussex
465 (118.4 overs); Wayne Madsen 111 (182); Henry Crocombe 4/92 (26 overs)		300 (84.4 overs); Ben Brown 157 (190); Ben Aitchison 4/80 (21 overs)
23/1 (3.4 overs); Matt Critchley 15* (11); Henry Crocombe 1/8 (2 overs)		187 (50.3 overs) (f/o); Delray Rawlins 58 (46); Wayne Madsen 2/8 (2.3 overs)

Derbyshire won by 9 wickets
County Cricket Ground, Hove
Umpires: Neil Bainton and Paul Baldwin

- Derbyshire won the toss and elected to bat.

21–24 September 2021
Round 4
Scorecard

Leicestershire	v	Worcestershire
222 (82.3 overs); Louis Kimber 71 (150); Joe Leach 3/38 (17.3 overs)		422 (119.2 overs); Jake Libby 77 (136); Abidine Sakande 3/66 (21.2 overs)
211 (81 overs); George Rhodes 90 (220); Joe Leach 3/25 (18 overs)		12/0 (2.4 overs); Daryl Mitchell 9* (7)

Worcestershire won by 10 wickets
New Road, Worcester
Umpires: Hassan Adnan and Nick Cook

- Leicestershire won the toss and elected to bat.
- Sam Bates (Leicestershire) made his first-class debut.

=== Standings ===
==== Division One ====
Team	Pld	W	L	T	D	A	Bat	Bowl	Ded	PCF	Pts
Warwickshire (C) (Q)	4	2	1	0	1	0	6	10	0	21	77
Lancashire (Q)	4	2	1	0	1	0	7	10	0	16.5	73.5
Nottinghamshire	4	3	1	0	0	0	8	12	0	5	73
Hampshire	4	2	1	0	1	0	1	12	0	8.5	61.5
Yorkshire	4	1	2	0	1	0	4	12	0	4.5	44.5
Somerset	4	0	4	0	0	0	3	11	0	18.5	32.5

Source: CricketArchive, ESPNCricinfo, ECB
- (C) Warwickshire were the County Champions after finishing top of Division One.
- (Q) The teams that finished in the top two played for the Bob Willis Trophy.

==== Division Two ====
Team	Pld	W	L	T	D	A	Bat	Bowl	Ded	PCF	Pts
Essex	4	3	0	0	1	0	9	12	0	19	96
Gloucestershire	4	3	1	0	0	0	4	12	0	12	76
Durham (Note: The scheduled Round 1 match between Durham and Surrey (30 August–2 September) was cancelled due to COVID-19. As a result, Division Two standings were decided on an average points per completed match basis.)	3	1	1	0	1	0	7	9	0	4	44
Northamptonshire	4	1	2	0	1	0	3	11	0	16	54
Surrey	3	0	1	0	2	0	5	6	0	13	40
Glamorgan	4	0	3	0	1	0	6	9	0	11.5	34.5

Source: CricketArchive, ESPNCricinfo, ECB

==== Division Three ====
Team	Pld	W	L	T	D	A	Bat	Bowl	Ded	PCF	Pts
Kent	4	4	0	0	0	0	7	12	0	11	94
Middlesex	4	3	1	0	0	0	7	12	0	13	80
Worcestershire	4	2	2	0	0	0	5	12	0	18.5	67.5
Leicestershire	4	1	2	0	1	0	9	10	0	11.5	54.5
Derbyshire	4	1	2	0	1	0	8	10	0	9.5	51.5
Sussex	4	0	4	0	0	0	12	6	0	12	30

Source: CricketArchive, ESPNCricinfo

== Bob Willis Trophy ==
2021 Bob Willis Trophy
- Cricket format: First-class cricket (5 days)
- Champions: Warwickshire (1st title)
- Runners-up: Lancashire
- Most runs: Will Rhodes (156)
- Most wickets: Craig Miles (6)

Warwickshire and Lancashire finished first and second of County Championship Division One respectively, to play for the Bob Willis Trophy at Lord's.

28 September – 2 October 2021
Scorecard

Lancashire	v	Warwickshire
78 (27.5 overs); Luke Wood 46* (60); Craig Miles 5/28 (9.5 overs)		518 (147.3 overs); Will Rhodes 156 (291); Matt Parkinson 4/78 (31.3 overs)
241 (68.2 overs); George Balderson 65 (131); Danny Briggs 3/58 (19 overs)

Warwickshire won by an innings and 199 runs
Lord's, London
Umpires: David Millns and Mike Burns

- Warwickshire won the toss and elected to field.
- Manraj Johal (Warwickshire) made his first-class debut.
