= BWT =

BWT may refer to

- the Burrows–Wheeler transform, an algorithm used in file compression
- BWT, an Austrian wastewater company
- Bridgwater railway station, station code
- Bob Willis Trophy, English cricket competition
- Burnie Airport, IATA airport code "BWT"
- Barron William Trump (born 2006), youngest son of Donald Trump the 45th and 47th president of the United States

== See also ==
- .bwt files, produced by BlindWrite
