= Danial Ibrahim =

English cricketer (born 2004)

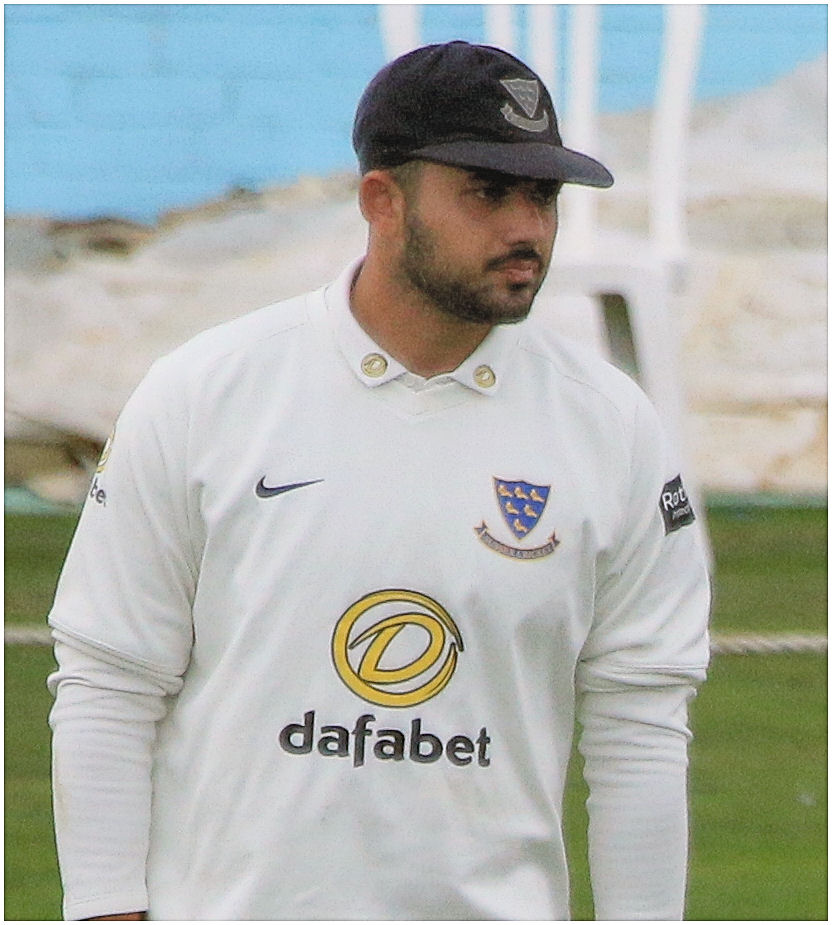
- Ibrahim in 2025

Personal information
- Full name: Danial Ibrahim
- Born: 9 August 2004 (age 22); Burnley, Lancashire, England
- Batting: Right-handed
- Bowling: Right-arm fast-medium
- Role: All-rounder

Domestic team information
- Years: Team
- 2021–present: Sussex (squad no. 40)
- First-class debut: 3 June 2021 Sussex v Yorkshire
- List A debut: 23 July 2021 Sussex v Lancashire

Career statistics
Competition	FC	LA	T20
Matches	23	35	4
Runs scored	940	530	47
Batting average	24.73	17.66	11.75
100s/50s	2/4	0/4	0/0
Top score	121*	56	18
Balls bowled	937	828	–
Wickets	7	15	–
Bowling average	87.28	50.86	–
5 wickets in innings	0	0	–
10 wickets in match	0	0	–
Best bowling	2/9	3/34	–
Catches/stumpings	11/–	14/–	0/–
- Source: Cricinfo, 26 September 2026

Danial Ibrahim (born 9 August 2004) is an English cricketer.

== Early life ==
Ibrahim's parents are from Pakistan, where his father played some first-class cricket.

He was educated at Bede's School, and played club cricket for Preston Nomads.1st at the age of 15

== Domestic career ==
He made his first-class debut on 3 June 2021, for Sussex in the 2021 County Championship. At the age of 16 years and 299 days, Ibrahim became the youngest cricketer to score a half-century in the history of the County Championship. He made his List A debut on 23 July 2021, for Sussex in the 2021 Royal London One-Day Cup.

== International career ==
In December 2022 he was selected for the England national under-19 cricket team to play Australia in January 2023 under head coach Michael Yardy.
