= Dane Schadendorf =

Zimbabwean cricketer (born 2002)

Personal information
- Full name: Dane Schadendorf
- Born: 31 July 2002 (age 24); Harare, Zimbabwe
- Batting: Right-handed
- Bowling: Right-arm medium
- Role: Wicket-keeper

Domestic team information
- Years: Team
- 2021–2025: Nottinghamshire (squad no. 89)
- 2023/24: Mountaineers
- First-class debut: 4 July 2021 Nottinghamshire v Derbyshire
- List A debut: 25 July 2021 Nottinghamshire v Warwickshire

Career statistics
Competition	FC	LA
Matches	3	34
Runs scored	93	502
Batting average	23.25	20.08
100s/50s	0/0	0/1
Top score	29	51
Catches/stumpings	11/–	22/5
- Source: Cricinfo, 6 October 2025

Dane Schadendorf (born 31 July 2002) is a Zimbabwean (Note: Schadendorf also holds a British passport.) cricketer. He made his first-class debut on 4 July 2021, for Nottinghamshire in the 2021 County Championship. Prior to his first-class debut, Schadendorf was named in Zimbabwe's squad for the 2020 Under-19 Cricket World Cup.

In 2020, Schadendorf relocated to England to progress his cricket. He signed for Nottinghamshire in December 2020 on professional terms, having already played club cricket for Caythorpe as well as for Nottinghamshire's Under-18s and second XI in the 2020 season. He made his List A debut on 25 July 2021, for Nottinghamshire in the 2021 Royal London One-Day Cup. Schadendorf signed a one-year contract extension with Nottinghamshire in October 2024. He left the club in October 2025 after his contract expired.
