= Jamie Atkins =

English cricketer (born 2002)

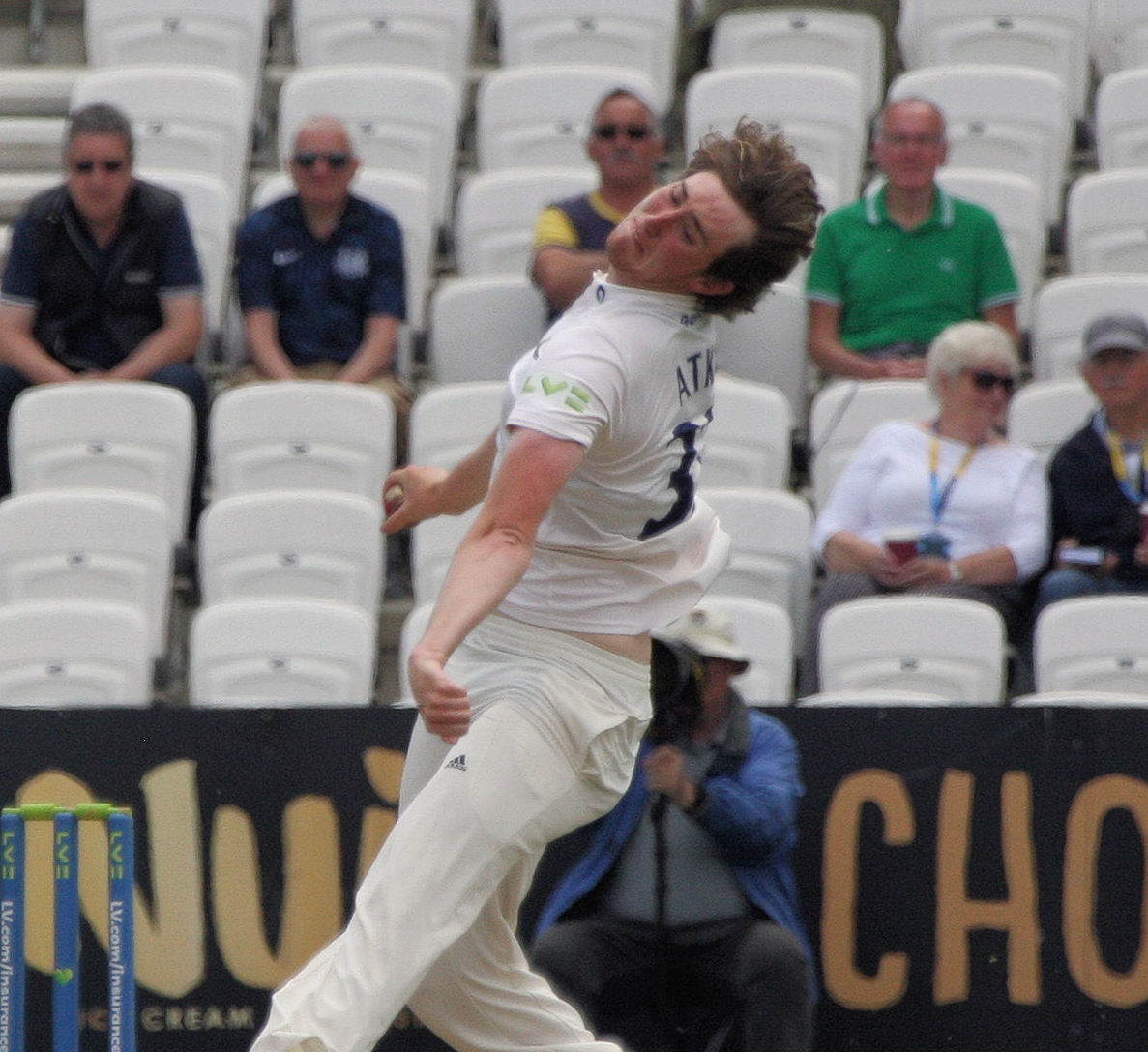
- Atkins bowling for Sussex CCC in June 2021

Personal information
- Full name: Jamie Ardley Atkins
- Born: 20 May 2002 (age 24); Redhill, Surrey, England
- Batting: Right-handed
- Bowling: Right-arm fast-medium
- Role: Bowler

Domestic team information
- Years: Team
- 2021–2023: Sussex (squad no. 88)
- First-class debut: 29 April 2021 Sussex v Lancashire
- Last First-class: 21 April 2022 Sussex v Worcestershire
- Only List A: 20 August 2023 Sussex v Worcestershire

Career statistics
Competition	FC	LA
Matches	8	1
Runs scored	57	1
Batting average	8.14	—
100s/50s	0/0	0/0
Top score	17	1*
Balls bowled	1,157	22
Wickets	24	0
Bowling average	30.12	—
5 wickets in innings	2	—
10 wickets in match	0	—
Best bowling	5/51	—
Catches/stumpings	0/–	0/–
- Source: Cricinfo, 23 August 2023

Jamie Ardley Atkins (born 20 May 2002) is a former English cricketer. He made his first-class debut on 29 April 2021, for Sussex in the 2021 County Championship. Prior to his first-class debut, Atkins has played in Sussex's under-15 and under-17 teams.

At the end of the 2023 season, Atkins retired from cricket to pursue a career outside of the professional game.
