= Joe Sarro =

English cricketer (born 2002)

Personal information
- Full name: Joseph Peter Sarro
- Born: 27 January 2002 (age 24); Eastbourne, Sussex, England
- Batting: Right-handed
- Bowling: Right-arm fast-medium

Domestic team information
- Years: Team
- 2021: Sussex (squad no. 29)
- First-class debut: 6 May 2021 Sussex v Northamptonshire
- List A debut: 23 July 2021 Sussex v Lancashire

Career statistics
Competition	FC	LA
Matches	3	5
Runs scored	8	4
Batting average	2.66	–
100s/50s	0/0	–/–
Top score	7*	4*
Balls bowled	258	156
Wickets	4	4
Bowling average	55.00	47.25
5 wickets in innings	0	0
10 wickets in match	0	0
Best bowling	2/53	2/41
Catches/stumpings	1/–	0/–
- Source: Cricinfo, 23 September 2021

Joseph Peter Sarro (born 27 January 2002) is an English professional cricketer who plays for Sussex County Cricket Club. Sarro is a right-handed batsman and a right-arm fast-medium bowler.

Educated at Bede's School, Sarro studies business management at Loughborough University. He started playing for Sussex at the under-11s age group, signing his first professional contract for the team in April 2021.

He made his first-class debut on 6 May 2021 for Sussex against Northamptonshire in the 2021 County Championship at the County Cricket Ground, Northampton. He made his List A debut on 23 July 2021, for Sussex in the 2021 Royal London One-Day Cup.
