= Robbie White =

English cricketer (born 1995)

Personal information
- Full name: Robert George White
- Born: 15 September 1995 (age 31); Ealing, London, England
- Batting: Right-handed
- Bowling: Right-arm medium
- Role: Batsman, wicket-keeper

Domestic team information
- Years: Team
- 2015–2017: Loughborough MCCU
- 2015–2024: Middlesex (squad no. 14)
- 2019: → Essex (on loan)
- FC debut: 2 April 2015 Loughborough MCCU v Hampshire
- LA debut: 9 June 2018 Middlesex v Australia

Career statistics
Competition	FC	LA	T20
Matches	40	16	3
Runs scored	1,481	289	11
Batting average	24.68	26.27	11.00
100s/50s	2/8	0/2	0/0
Top score	120	55	11*
Catches/stumpings	51/2	19/3	1/0
- Source: Cricinfo, 28 September 2024

Robert George White (born 15 September 1995) is a retired English cricketer who played for Middlesex County Cricket Club. A wicket-keeper, who was a right-handed batsman, who also bowled right-arm medium pace. He made his first-class debut for Loughborough MCC University against Hampshire County Cricket Club in April 2015. He made his List A debut for Middlesex against Australia on 9 June 2018, during Australia's tour of England.

He made his Twenty20 debut for Middlesex in the 2018 t20 Blast on 3 August 2018. In August 2021, in the 2021 County Championship, White scored his maiden century in first-class cricket. White announced his retirement from professional cricket in September 2024.
