= Sam Evans (cricketer) =

English cricketer (born 1997)

Personal information
- Full name: Sam Thomas Evans
- Born: 20 December 1997 (age 28); Leicester, Leicestershire, England
- Batting: Right-handed
- Role: Batsman

Domestic team information
- Years: Team
- 2017–2018: Loughborough MCCU
- 2017–2024: Leicestershire (squad no. 21)
- First-class debut: 28 March 2017; Loughborough MCCU v Leics
- List A debut: 19 June 2018 Leics v India A

Career statistics
Competition	FC	LA
Matches	34	6
Runs scored	1,492	116
Batting average	27.62	38.66
100s/50s	4/6	0/1
Top score	138	60
Balls bowled	54	–
Wickets	0	–
Bowling average	–	–
5 wickets in innings	–	–
10 wickets in match	–	–
Best bowling	–	–
Catches/stumpings	11/–	0/–
- Source: Cricinfo, 30 September 2023

Sam Thomas Evans (born 20 December 1997) is an English cricketer. He made his first-class debut on 28 March 2017 for Loughborough MCCU against Leicestershire as part of the Marylebone Cricket Club University fixtures. He made his List A debut for Leicestershire against India A in a tri-series warm-up match on 19 June 2018. He scored 60 and featured in a 151 run seventh-wicket partnership with Harry Swindells as Leicestershire won the 2023 One-Day Cup final against Hampshire. Evans was released by Leicestershire at the end of the 2024 season.
