= Josh Baker (cricketer) =

English cricketer (2003–2024)

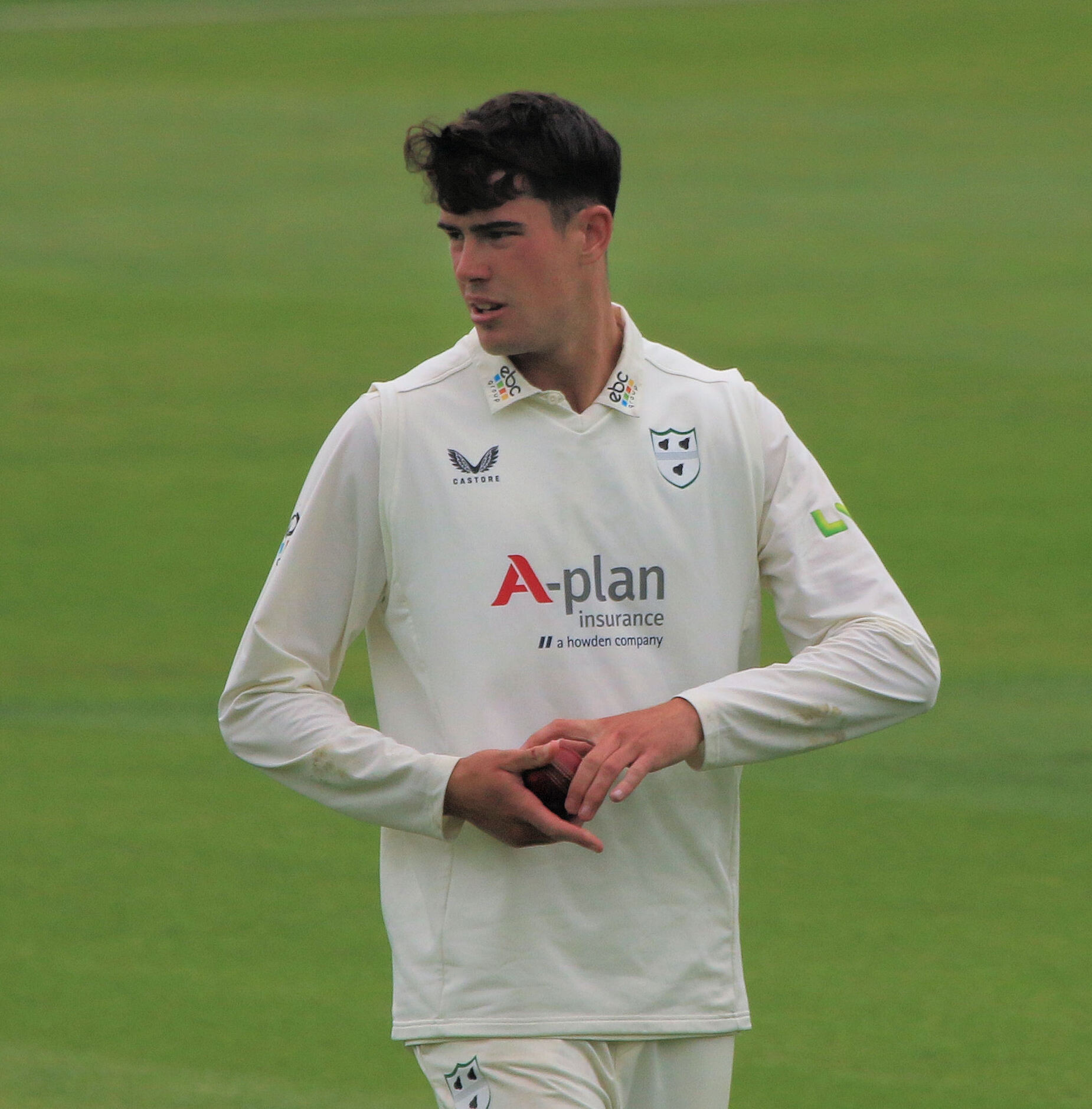
- Baker in 2023

Personal information
- Full name: Josh Oliver Baker
- Born: 16 May 2003; Redditch, Worcestershire, England
- Died: 2 May 2024 (aged 20)
- Batting: Right-handed
- Bowling: Slow left-arm orthodox
- Role: Bowler

Domestic team information
- Years: Team
- 2021–2024: Worcestershire (squad no. 33)
- First-class debut: 11 July 2021 Worcestershire v Warwickshire
- List A debut: 25 July 2021 Worcestershire v Kent

Career statistics
Competition	FC	LA	T20
Matches	22	17	8
Runs scored	411	100	14
Batting average	16.44	14.28	3.50
100s/50s	0/2	0/0	0/0
Top score	75	25	5
Balls bowled	3,728	789	132
Wickets	43	24	3
Bowling average	49.53	31.25	68.66
5 wickets in innings	0	0	0
10 wickets in match	0	0	0
Best bowling	4/51	3/29	2/26
Catches/stumpings	20/–	4/–	4/–
- Source: ESPNCricinfo

Josh Oliver Baker (16 May 2003 – 2 May 2024) was an English cricketer. Born in Redditch, Worcestershire, he was a student at Malvern College from 2016 to 2021. He made his first-class debut on 11 July 2021, for Worcestershire in the 2021 County Championship, after signing a rookie contract with the club the previous day. He made his List A debut on 25 July 2021, for Worcestershire in the 2021 Royal London One-Day Cup.

In December 2021, he was named as one of two reserve players in England's team for the 2022 ICC Under-19 Cricket World Cup in the West Indies. He made his Twenty20 debut on 25 May 2022, for the Worcestershire Rapids in the 2022 T20 Blast. In August 2022, Baker sustained a lower back injury that caused him to miss the rest of the season. On 21 March 2023, he signed three-year deal at Worcestershire County Cricket Club.

Baker died on 2 May 2024, at the age of 20, after collapsing due to an undiagnosed heart defect. On 9 May 2024, Worcestershire announced that all players would wear the 33 jerseys for the rest of the domestic season as a tribute to him. Worcestershire retired the number 33 shirt in Baker's memory in September 2024.
