= Sam Conners =

English cricketer (born 1999)

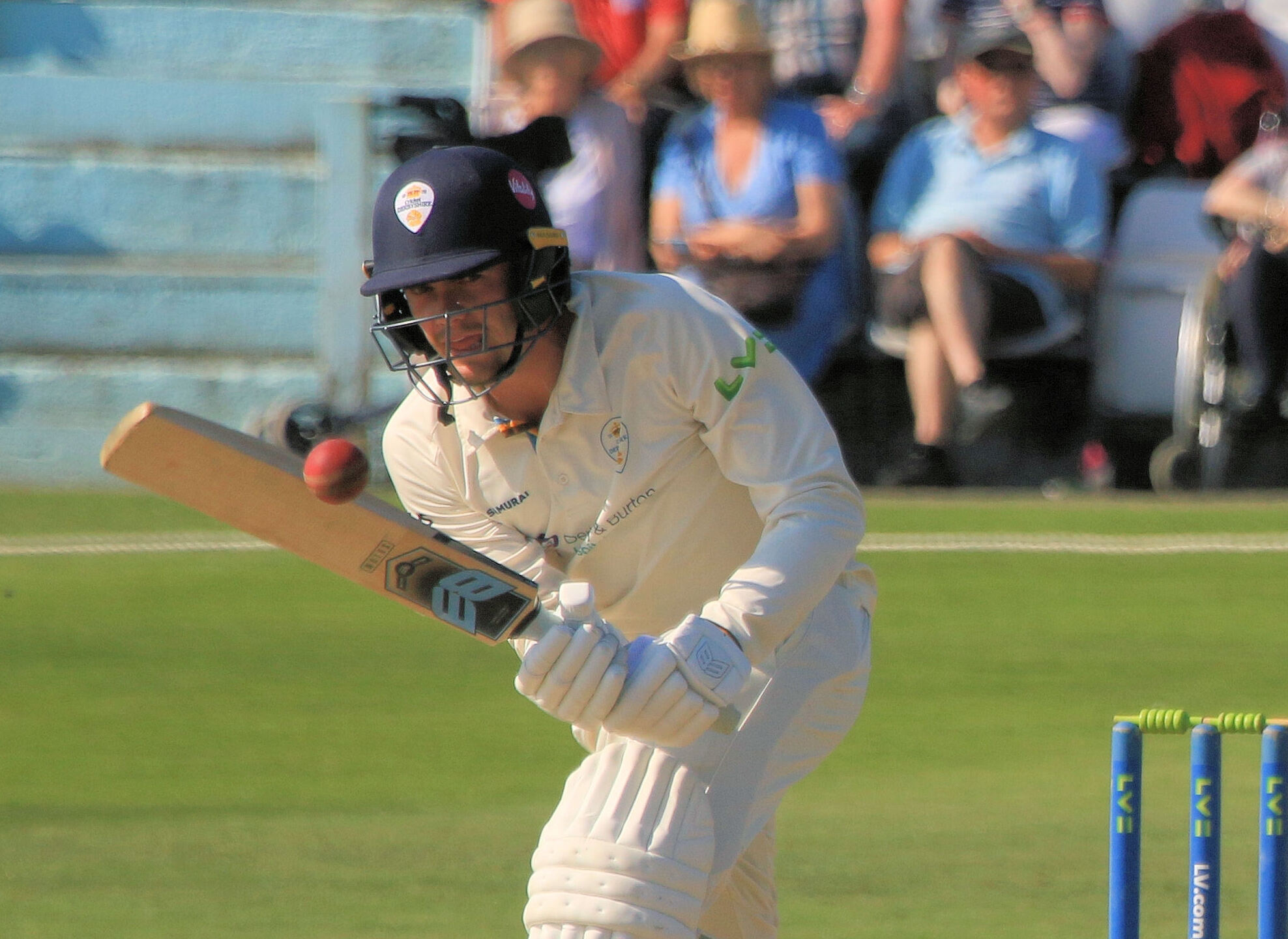
- Conners in 2023

Personal information
- Full name: Samuel Conners
- Born: 13 February 1999 (age 27); Nottingham, Nottinghamshire, England
- Batting: Right-handed
- Bowling: Right-arm fast

Domestic team information
- Years: Team
- 2019–2024: Derbyshire (squad no. 59)
- 2025–2026: Durham (squad no. 59)

Career statistics
Competition	FC	LA	T20
Matches	53	26	18
Runs scored	435	71	7
Batting average	9.66	7.88	2.33
100s/50s	0/0	0/0	0/0
Top score	39	36*	2*
Balls bowled	8,141	1,278	218
Wickets	134	32	13
Bowling average	38.34	38.59	31.30
5 wickets in innings	4	1	0
10 wickets in match	0	0	0
Best bowling	5/51	5/28	3/25
Catches/stumpings	14/–	6/–	5/–
- Source: Cricinfo, 5 May 2026

Samuel Conners (born 13 February 1999) is an English cricketer. He was born in Nottingham and attended George Spencer Academy in Stapleford, Nottinghamshire. In July 2018, he played for the England under-19 cricket team against South Africa, before signing a two-year deal with Derbyshire.

He made his first-class debut on 26 March 2019 for Derbyshire against Leeds/Bradford MCCU, as part of the Marylebone Cricket Club University fixtures. He made his List A debut on 24 April 2019 for Derbyshire in the 2019 Royal London One-Day Cup. He made his Twenty20 debut on 30 August 2020, for Derbyshire in the 2020 t20 Blast.

In April 2021, Conners took his maiden five-wicket haul in first-class cricket, with 5/83 against Durham in the 2021 County Championship.

Conners joined Durham on a two-year contract in August 2024. He agreed a one-year contract extension in October 2026.
