= Manraj Johal =

English cricketer (born 2001)

Personal information
- Full name: Manraj Singh Johal
- Born: 12 October 2001 (age 25); Birmingham, West Midlands, England
- Batting: Right-handed
- Bowling: Right-arm fast-medium
- Role: Bowler

Domestic team information
- Years: Team
- 2021: Warwickshire (squad no. 5)
- Only FC: 28 September 2021 Warwickshire v Lancashire
- LA debut: 22 July 2021 Warwickshire v Glamorgan

Career statistics
Competition	First-class	List A
Matches	1	6
Runs scored	19	16
Batting average	19.00	8.00
100s/50s	0/0	0/0
Top score	19	10*
Balls bowled	108	250
Wickets	4	7
Bowling average	14.75	32.57
5 wickets in innings	0	0
10 wickets in match	0	0
Best bowling	3/29	2/35
Catches/stumpings	0/–	2/–
- Source: Cricinfo, 1 October 2021

Manraj Singh Johal (born 12 October 2001) is an English cricketer. Johal studied at Sandwell College and Oldbury Academy, and played age group cricket with Warwickshire from the U-11s onwards. He also played minor league cricket for Staffordshire. In October 2020, he signed a professional contract with Warwickshire. He made his List A debut on 22 July 2021, for Warwickshire in the 2021 Royal London One-Day Cup.

Johal made his first-class debut on 28 September 2021, for Warwickshire in the 2021 Bob Willis Trophy, the final of the 2021 County Championship.
