= Jack Carson (cricketer) =

English cricketer (born 2000)

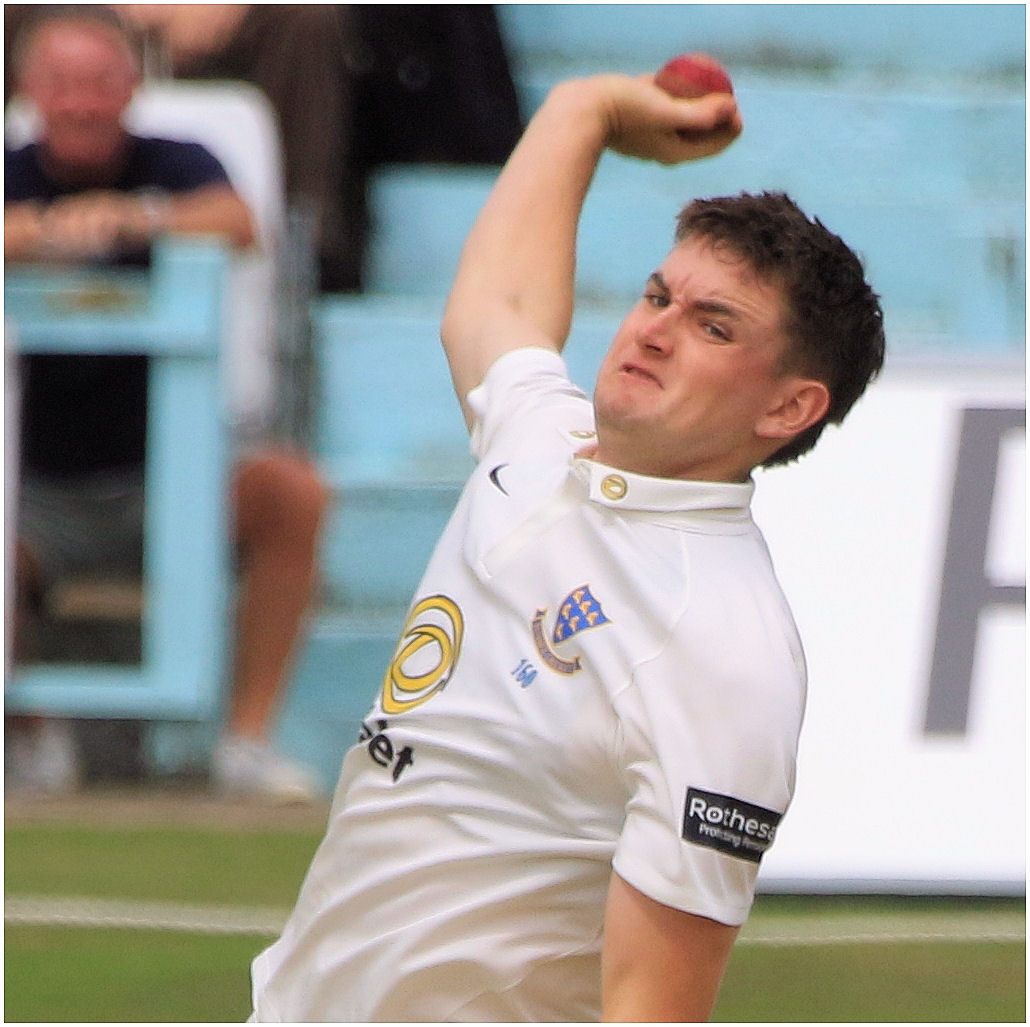
- Carson in 2025

Personal information
- Full name: Jack Joshua Carson
- Born: 3 December 2000 (age 25); Craigavon, County Armagh, Northern Ireland
- Batting: Right-handed
- Bowling: Right-arm off break
- Role: Bowler

Domestic team information
- Years: Team
- 2020–present: Sussex (squad no. 16)
- First-class debut: 1 August 2020 Sussex v Hampshire
- List A debut: 4 August 2023 Sussex v Durham

Career statistics
Competition	FC	LA	T20
Matches	78	23	25
Runs scored	2,550	556	140
Batting average	23.83	34.75	14.00
100s/50s	2/13	0/4	0/0
Top score	105	81	26
Balls bowled	12,410	1,157	281
Wickets	205	24	20
Bowling average	33.96	48.66	22.90
5 wickets in innings	7	0	0
10 wickets in match	1	0	0
Best bowling	6/67	4/83	3/43
Catches/stumpings	42/–	10/–	7/–
- Source: Cricinfo, 26 September 2026

Jack Joshua Carson (born 3 December 2000) is a professional cricketer. He made his first-class debut on 1 August 2020, for Sussex in the 2020 Bob Willis Trophy. He was Sussex's leading wicket-taker in the competition, and also the 2021 County Championship. Carson is eligible to play international cricket for either England or Ireland.

== Career ==
Carson began his career as a batsman, but is now predominantly a bowler. He is eligible to play for England having met the residency requirements to play for England in April 2020. As Carson is currently signed to English county Sussex as a domestic player, he is presently ineligible to play for Ireland, as since 2019, Irish international cricketers have to be registered as overseas players.

As a youngster, Carson played for Waringstown Cricket Club youth teams. In 2012, he scored 121* in the All-Ireland Cup Final. He scored 600 runs without being dismissed in the season. He captained Waringstown in the Under-13 inter-provincial championships in 2014, and also played for Sussex from under-12 level, after being recommended by Sussex and Ireland cricketer Ed Joyce. In 2015, Carson was signed up to the Cricket Ireland Academy, and made his last appearance for the academy in 2016. In 2018, he played in a Sussex pre-season tour with the senior squad in Cape Town, South Africa.

Carson made his first-class debut on 1 August 2020, for Sussex in the 2020 Bob Willis Trophy. He took a wicket with the second delivery that he bowled in the match, and finished with match figures of 5/52. Carson took his first five-wicket haul in a Bob Willis Trophy match against Surrey at The Oval. In total, he took 15 wickets in the competition, the most of any Sussex player. In October 2020, Carson signed a two-year rookie contract with Sussex, which would be upgraded to a fully professional contract once Carson played five first-class matches. After Sussex's 2021 County Championship match against Yorkshire, Carson was compared to England off-spinner Dom Bess. Carson had taken a five-wicket haul in the match, including the wicket of England captain Joe Root. In June 2021, Carson signed a multi-year contract extension with Sussex. He was Sussex's top wicket-taker in the 2021 County Championship with 37 wickets at an average of 36.10.

In January 2026, Carson was named as captain of Sussex 50-over team for that year's season.

== Personal life ==
Carson is from Craigavon, County Armagh, Northern Ireland, and his family now live in Waringstown, County Down. He has two older brothers, and their father played cricket for Donacloney Cricket Club. He attended Banbridge Academy, and Hurstpierpoint College.
