= Liam Norwell =

English cricketer (born 1991)

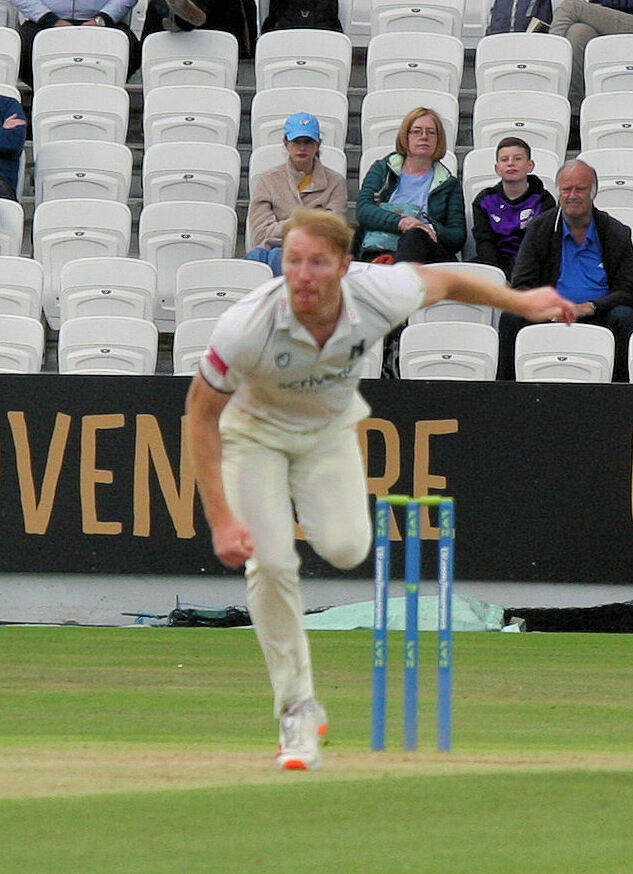
- Norwell in 2021

Personal information
- Full name: Liam Connor Norwell
- Born: 27 December 1991 (age 34); Bournemouth, Dorset, England
- Batting: Right-handed
- Bowling: Right arm medium

Domestic team information
- Years: Team
- 2011–2018: Gloucestershire (squad no. 24)
- 2019–2024: Warwickshire (squad no. 24)
- First-class debut: 8 April 2011 Gloucestershire v Derbyshire
- List A debut: 17 July 2012 Gloucestershire v Worcestershire

Career statistics
Competition	FC	LA	T20
Matches	91	26	26
Runs scored	1,058	63	5
Batting average	14.10	6.30	5.00
100s/50s	1/2	0/0	0/0
Top score	102	16	2*
Balls bowled	15,933	1,291	459
Wickets	347	33	13
Bowling average	24.66	35.63	56.69
5 wickets in innings	16	2	0
10 wickets in match	4	0	0
Best bowling	9/62	6/52	3/27
Catches/stumpings	18/–	4/–	10/–
- Source: ESPNcricinfo, 29 September 2022

Liam Connor Norwell (born 27 December 1991) is a former English cricketer who last played for Warwickshire. A right-handed batsman and right-hand medium pace bowler he made his first-class debut for Gloucestershire against Derbyshire in April 2011. Norwell signed a new two-year contract for Gloucestershire in 2013. He retired from professional cricket in 2024 after a series of injuries.

== County career ==
Born in Bournemouth, Dorset, Norwell made his first-class debut for Gloucestershire in April 2011 against Derbyshire as a 19-year-old. In the first innings Norwell made 19 runs before being run out by Tim Groenewald helping Gloucestershire to 343. In the Derbyshire first innings, Norwell produced an impressive display bowling 11 overs taking 6 wickets for just 46 runs as he helped bowl Derbyshire out for just 157. This remains to this day his best first-class bowling performance. In the second innings Norwell managed 1 wicket, that of Wayne Madsen to take match figures of 7–112 as Gloucestershire won by 7 wickets. Norwell followed up this performance with an appearance in the following first-class game against Glamorgan. Norwell took 2 wickets for 49 runs in the first innings helping bowl out Glamorgan for 202. He scored 11 not out in the reply and was wicketless in the second as Gloucestershire lost by 189 runs. Norwell then appeared for Gloucestershire in a drawn match against Middlesex. He opened the bowling in the Middlesex innings along with captain Jon Lewis and took 3 wickets for 102 runs, dismissing Middlesex for 406.

Norwell was hit by injuries in 2013, but coach John Bracewell saw enough for Norwell to be offered a new contract, which he signed through to the end of the 2015 season.

Norwell moved to Warwickshire in 2018, and was the County's top wicket taker as Warwickshire won the 2021 County Championship, taking 49 wickets at an average of 18.21.. Despite winning the title, the next season Warwickshire were nearly relegated and were saved by Norwell as he took 9/62 in the second innings against Hampshire at Edgbaston on the final day of the 2022 County Championship season to help his club win by five runs and avoid relegation from Division One. A series of injuries meant he did not play another first-team match for Warwickshire and he left the club in August 2024.

On 12 November 2024, he was retired from professional cricket at the age of 32, due to failing to recover from a series of long-standing injuries.

== Career best performances ==
as of 29 September 2022

	Batting					Bowling				
	Score	Fixture	Venue	Season	Ref	Figures	Fixture	Venue	Season	Ref
FC	102	Gloucestershire v Derbyshire	Bristol	2016		9-62	Warwickshire v Hampshire	Birmingham	2022	
LA	16	Gloucestershire v Somerset	Bristol	2017		6–52	Gloucestershire Gladiators v Leicestershire Foxes	Leicester	2012	
T20	2*	Gloucestershire v Kent	Bristol	2016		3–27	Gloucestershire Gladiators v Middlesex	Bristol	2014	
