= Brooke Guest =

English cricketer (born 1997)

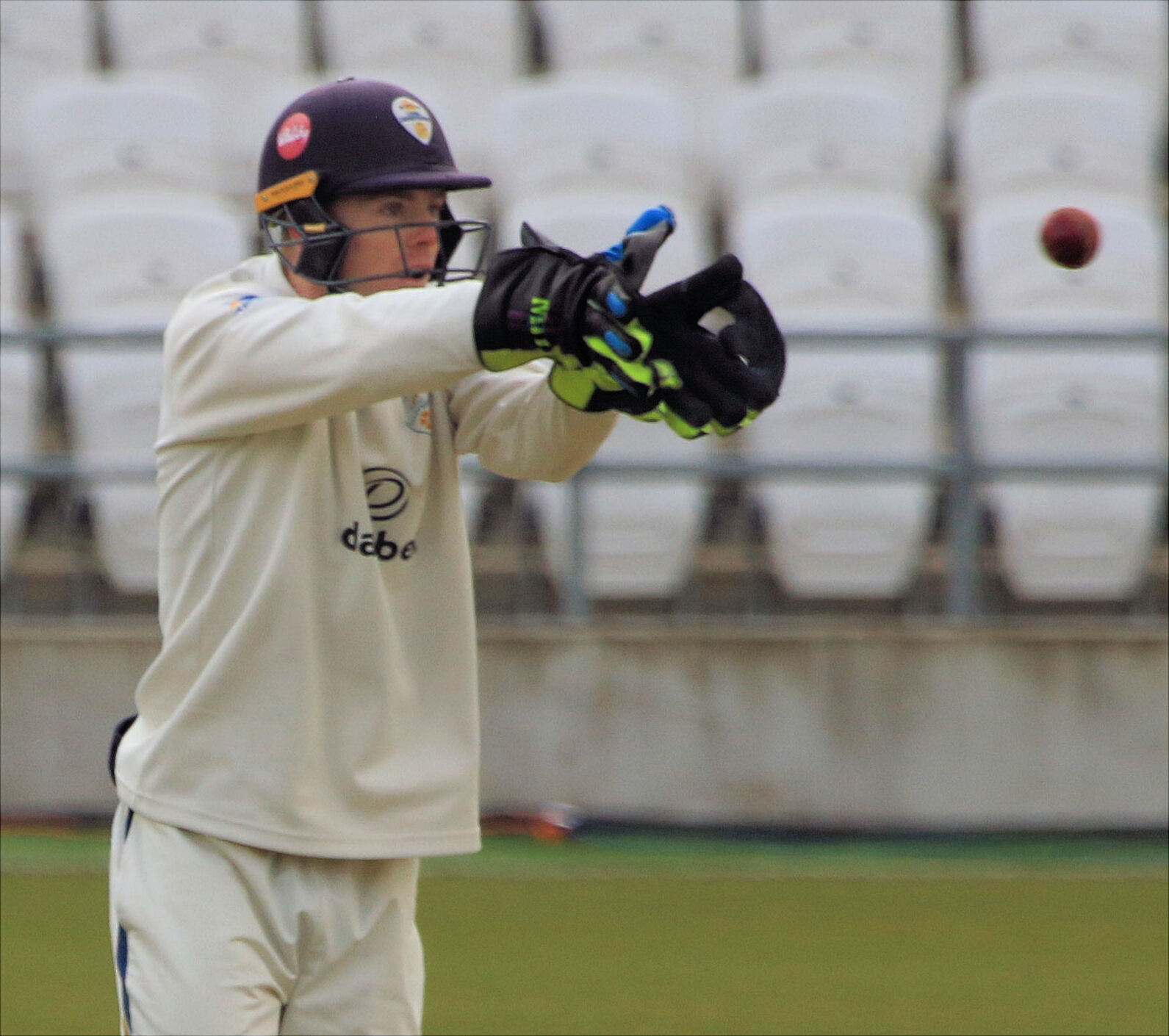
- Guest in 2024

Personal information
- Full name: Brooke David Guest
- Born: 14 May 1997 (age 29); Manchester, England
- Batting: Right-handed
- Role: Wicket-keeper

Domestic team information
- Years: Team
- 2017–2020: Lancashire (squad no. 29)
- 2020: → Derbyshire (on loan)
- 2021–present: Derbyshire (squad no. 29)
- 2024: Comilla Victorians
- First-class debut: 24 September 2018 Lancashire v Hampshire
- List A debut: 17 April 2019 Lancashire v Worcestershire

Career statistics
Competition	FC	LA	T20
Matches	84	47	64
Runs scored	3,957	1,503	934
Batting average	30.67	36.65	27.47
100s/50s	8/17	1/9	0/1
Top score	197	108*	54
Catches/stumpings	238/7	49/3	37/8
- Source: Cricinfo, 27 September 2026

Brooke David Guest (born 14 May 1997) is an English cricketer. He made his first-class debut for Lancashire in the 2018 County Championship on 24 September 2018. He made his List A debut on 17 April 2019, for Lancashire in the 2019 Royal London One-Day Cup. On 10 August 2020, Derbyshire announced they had signed Guest on a two-year deal. He's since extended the deal by another year. He made his Twenty20 debut on 30 August 2020, for Derbyshire in the 2020 t20 Blast. In September 2021, in the 2021 County Championship, Guest scored his maiden century in first-class cricket. Guest signed a new two-year contract with Derbyshire in April 2025, tying him into the club until the end of the 2027 season.
