= Sam Bates (cricketer) =

English cricketer (born 1999)

Personal information
- Full name: Samuel David Bates
- Born: 14 September 1999 (age 27); Leicester, Leicestershire, England
- Batting: Left-handed
- Role: Wicket-keeper

Domestic team information
- Years: Team
- 2021: Leicestershire (squad no. 14)
- Only FC: 21 September 2021 Leicestershire v Worcestershire

Career statistics
Competition	First-class
Matches	1
Runs scored	6
Batting average	3.00
100s/50s	0/0
Top score	6
Catches/stumpings	2/1
- Source: Cricinfo, 21 September 2021

Samuel David Bates (born 14 September 1999) is an English cricketer. He made his first-class debut on 21 September 2021, for Leicestershire in the 2021 County Championship.
