= Bob Willis Trophy =

Cricket competition

- Countries: England and Wales
- Administrator: England and Wales Cricket Board
- Format: First-class cricket
- First edition: 2020
- Latest edition: 2021
- Tournament format: Final
- Number of teams: 2
- Current champion: Warwickshire (1st title)
- Most successful: Warwickshire; Essex (1 title each)

The Bob Willis Trophy was a domestic first-class cricket competition in England and Wales for the eighteen first-class counties, organised by the England and Wales Cricket Board (ECB).

It was established in the 2020 English cricket season. The tournament was named the Bob Willis Trophy in honour of former England cricket captain and fast bowler Bob Willis, who died in December 2019.

While in 2020 it was promoted as being a one-off competition, the Bob Willis Trophy was contested again in 2021 as a five-day final between the top two teams in County Championship Division One. In January 2022, the ECB announced that the Bob Willis Trophy would not be played to end that year's championship; managing director of county cricket Neil Snowball said that the ECB was discussing the future format of the trophy with Willis's family.

From 2022 the trophy was adopted by the Cricket Writers' Club, to be presented to England's player of the year. The inaugural winner was Jonny Bairstow.

== Results ==
Year	Format	Final			
Year	Format	Venue	Winners	Result	Runners-up
2020	Leagues and final	Lord's	Essex; 337/8 & 179/6	Essex won on first innings scores after match drawn Scorecard	Somerset; 301 & 272/7d
2021	Single match	Lord's	Warwickshire; 518	Warwickshire won by an innings and 199 runs Scorecard	Lancashire; 78 & 241
