= Henry Crocombe =

English cricketer (born 2001)

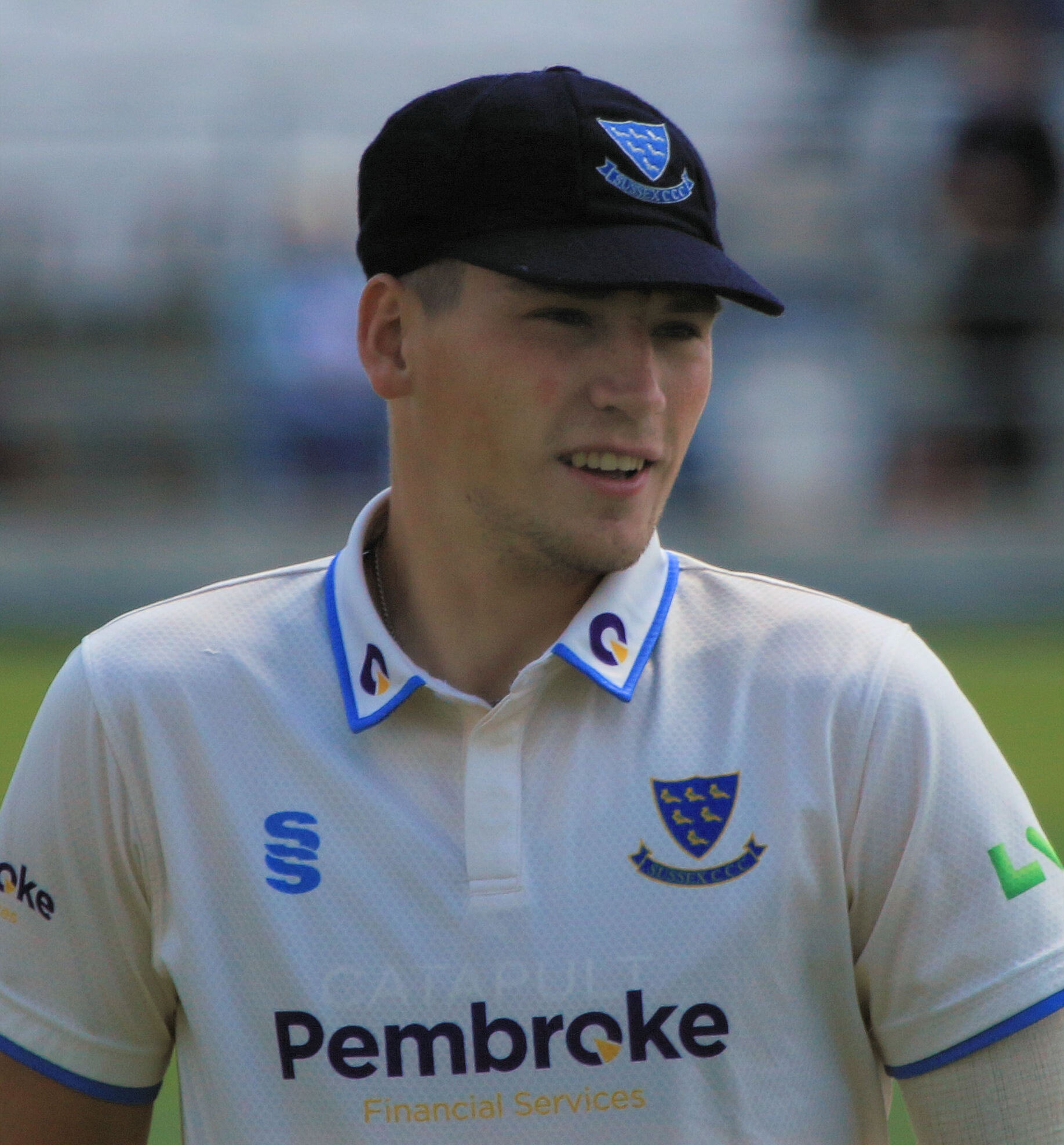
- Crocombe in 2023

Personal information
- Full name: Henry Thomas Crocombe
- Born: 20 September 2001 (age 25); Eastbourne, East Sussex, England
- Nickname: Crocs
- Batting: Right-handed
- Bowling: Right-arm medium-fast
- Role: Bowler

International information
- National side: England (2026–present)
- ODI debut (cap 282): 25 October 2026 v Pakistan
- Last ODI: 29 October 2026 v Sri Lanka
- Only T20I (cap 112): 21 November 2026 v Australia

Domestic team information
- Years: Team
- 2020–2026: Sussex (squad no. 5)
- 2026: London Spirit

Career statistics
Competition	ODI	T20I	FC	LA
Matches	2	1	51	38
Runs scored	8	–	540	211
Batting average	8.00	–	10.18	15.07
100s/50s	0/0	–/–	0/1	0/0
Top score	8	–	54	47
Balls bowled	55	14	6,538	1,701
Wickets	2	1	125	51
Bowling average	42.00	20.00	33.27	33.80
5 wickets in innings	0	0	3	0
10 wickets in match	0	0	0	0
Best bowling	1/27	1/20	5/33	4/47
Catches/stumpings	0/–	0/–	14/–	13/–
- Source: Cricinfo, 21 November 2026

Henry Thomas Crocombe (born 20 September 2001) is an English cricketer. He made his first-class debut on 1 August 2020, for Sussex in the 2020 Bob Willis Trophy. He made his Twenty20 debut on 11 June 2021, for Sussex in the 2021 T20 Blast. He made his List A debut on 23 July 2021, for Sussex in the 2021 Royal London One-Day Cup. In February 2025, Crocombe agreed a contract extension to keep him at Sussex until the end of the 2026 season.. In mid 2026 it was announced that he will join Surrey from the start of the 2027 season.

In June 2026, Crocombe was named in the England Lions squad for their 50-over series against South Africa A, marking his first selection at England Lions level.

His selection followed a strong start to the 2026 domestic season for Sussex, during which he took 19 wickets in the County Championship and established himself as a leading seam option in the attack. He was also highlighted for his performances in Division Two cricket as Sussex’s bowling unit impressed early in the season.

On 1 July 2026, it was announced that Crocombe would be leaving Sussex at the end of the 2026 season to join Surrey.

In rounds 10 and 11 of the 2026 County Championship, Crocombe took two hat-tricks in the space of eight days, firstly against Somerset at Hove on 27 August, and then against Essex at Chelmsford on 3 September.
