= Jake Libby =

English cricketer (born 1993)

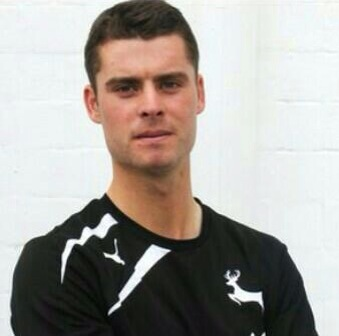

Personal information
- Full name: Jacob Daniel Libby
- Born: 3 January 1993 (age 33); Plymouth, Devon, England
- Height: 5 ft 9 in (1.75 m)
- Batting: Right-handed
- Bowling: Right-arm off-break
- Role: Batsman

Domestic team information
- Years: Team
- 2014: Cardiff MCCU
- 2014–2019: Nottinghamshire (squad no. 2)
- 2016: → Northamptonshire (on loan)
- 2020–present: Worcestershire (squad no. 2)
- First-class debut: 1 April 2014; Cardiff MCCU v Glamorgan
- List A debut: 19 April 2019 Nottinghamshire v Lancashire

Career statistics
Competition	FC	LA	T20
Matches	143	58	58
Runs scored	8,477	2,607	1,209
Batting average	36.85	62.07	28.11
100s/50s	22/37	7/18	0/5
Top score	228*	126*	78*
Balls bowled	1,354	273	54
Wickets	13	6	1
Bowling average	64.61	40.66	77.00
5 wickets in innings	0	0	0
10 wickets in match	0	0	0
Best bowling	2/10	2/47	1/11
Catches/stumpings	64/–	22/–	17/–
- Source: Cricinfo, 27 September 2026

Jacob Daniel Libby (born 3 January 1993) is an English cricketer. He is a right-handed batsman who plays for Worcestershire.

== Biography ==
Born to parents Debbie and Paul, and brother to Aidan, Libby first played a Devon Premier League match in July 2008, before becoming a regular with Callington in the Cornwall Premier League from 2009. He played for Callington until 2014, while also representing Cornwall in minor counties cricket from 2011 to 2014.

Libby attended Cardiff Metropolitan University to study Sports Science, where he secured a 2:1 grade. He failed to make the team for Cardiff MCCU in his first two years at the University, before breaking into the side in his third-year. He made first-class debut against Glamorgan on 1 April 2014, scoring 5 and 11* in two innings as the match was drawn. The following week he scored 65 in another draw against Gloucestershire.

Following the end of the MCCU season, Libby returned to playing cricket in Cornwall. In July 2014 he was offered a trial at Nottinghamshire on the recommendation of his coaches in Cornwall and at Cardiff MCCU. On 15 July 2014, the first day of his Second XI Championship debut he scored 225* for Notts against Warwickshire. Off the back of his form in the second XI, he secured a two-year contract with the club.

On 15 September 2014 Libby made his County Championship Division One debut for Nottinghamshire against Sussex. Opening the batting, he scored 108 in his side's first innings, becoming the first Nottinghamshire player to score a century on debut since 1946. He spent the 2014–15 English off-season playing first grade cricket for Latrobe Cricket Club in Tasmania, averaging 82.6 with the bat and 13.8 with the ball.

He made his Twenty20 debut for Nottinghamshire in the 2018 t20 Blast on 13 July 2018. He made his List A debut on 19 April 2019, for Nottinghamshire in the 2019 Royal London One-Day Cup.

Libby joined Worcestershire in November 2019. In January 2024, he signed a new four-year contract with the club.
