= Harry Swindells =

English cricketer (born 1999)

Personal information
- Full name: Harry John Swindells
- Born: 21 February 1999 (age 27); Leicester, Leicestershire, England
- Batting: Right-handed
- Role: Wicket-keeper

Domestic team information
- Years: Team
- 2018–2025: Leicestershire (squad no. 28)
- First-class debut: 3 June 2019 Leics v Lancashire
- List A debut: 7 June 2018 Leicestershire v Durham

Career statistics
Competition	FC	LA	T20
Matches	43	23	36
Runs scored	1,629	567	521
Batting average	26.27	31.50	19.29
100s/50s	2/8	1/4	0/3
Top score	171*	117*	63
Catches/stumpings	75/3	16/3	15/3
- Source: Cricinfo, 30 July 2025

Harry John Swindells (born 21 February 1999) is an English cricketer. He made his List A debut for Leicestershire in the 2018 Royal London One-Day Cup on 7 June 2018. Swindells made his Twenty20 debut in the 2018 T20 Blast on 3 August 2018 and his first-class debut on 3 June 2019. He made 117 not out in the final of the Metro Bank One Day Cup at Trent Bridge on 16 September 2023. Leicestershire went on to win the Cup by a margin of two runs. On 30 July 2025, Swindells announced his retirement from professional cricket due to a finger injury.
