= 2024 County Championship =

Cricket tournament

- Dates: 5 April 2024 – 29 September 2024
- Administrator: England and Wales Cricket Board
- Cricket format: First-class cricket (4 days)
- Tournament format: League system
- Champions: Surrey (23rd title)
- Participants: 18
- Matches: 126
- Most runs: David Bedingham (1,331) (Div 1); Colin Ingram (1,351) (Div 2)
- Most wickets: Jamie Porter (56) (Div 1); Ben Coad (56) (Div 2)

The 2024 County Championship (referred to as the Vitality County Championship for sponsorship reasons) was the 124th County Championship cricket season in England and Wales. As in 2023, Division One had ten teams and Division Two had eight teams. The season began on 5 April and ended on 29 September 2024. Surrey won the title with one match remaining, repeating their success in 2022 and 2023. They were the first team to become champions in three successive years since Yorkshire in 1966–68, having last achieved this feat themselves in 1958.

== Overview ==
For the 2024 season, the number of points for a draw was increased from five to eight, as had been the case from 2019 to 2022. The use of hybrid pitches (Note: In a hybrid pitch, plastic is used to hold the grass roots together below ground level, allowing the wicket to be used three or four times without needing to be prepared again.) was permitted for the first time, despite previous concerns that they do not deteriorate enough during a four-day match and are therefore suitable only for limited overs cricket. On 29 August, however, the game between Gloucestershire and Northamptonshire at Bristol had to be abandoned on the first day after the surface produced uneven bounce, resulting in two Northamptonshire batters being injured.

In research carried out by the Professional Cricketers' Association prior to the start of the season, concerns were expressed about players' welfare due to the congested schedule (including the T20 Blast, One-Day Cup, and The Hundred).

=== The Kookaburra debate ===
Following a trial during the 2023 County Championship, when the traditional English Dukes ball was replaced for two rounds by the less bowler-friendly Australian Kookaburra, the England and Wales Cricket Board (ECB) mandated using the Kookaburra ball for four rounds of the 2024 season. The motivation behind this was to develop bowlers with the skills to compete at an international level, give spinners more of a role at the beginning of the season, and encourage batters to score quickly.

After the Kookaburra had been used during the first two rounds of the 2024 season, England men's team director Rob Key hailed the experiment a success. Spin bowlers contributed 37% (1035.4 overs) of deliveries in the opening two rounds, compared with 17% (767.3 overs) in 2023, and took 135 (72 more) wickets. Batters hit as many double centuries as in the entire previous season, and in the second round accumulated 10 scores of 150 or more, which was a record for a set of matches starting on the same day. However, all but one of the 19 games played in the opening two rounds ended in a draw. In the second round, all matches were drawn for just the third time when all counties had played simultaneously, and matches were criticised for being dull. Key's comments "caused something of a furore".

Writing in Wisden Cricket Monthly, Laurence Booth noted that using the Kookaburra on spongy pitches during one of the UK's wettest springs was "like mixing oil with water – and expecting nectar", but pointed to the first-round performance of seam bowler Sam Cook in explaining Key's perspective. Mike Selvey commented in The Cricketer that rather than resorting to the use of a "substandard ball", Key's objectives might better be achieved by requiring groundsmen to cut the grass shorter and use a hard roller on pitches, whilst also making some changes to the Dukes ball so that the seam would flatten more quickly.

Across the four rounds played with the Kookaburra, statistics showed that seam bowlers achieved the best bowling average and strike rate at an average speed of 82–84 mph, compared to 76–79 mph with the Dukes ball, whilst spinners bowled around 50 per cent more deliveries.

== Teams ==
The teams were split based on the finishing positions in the 2023 season, with 10 teams in Division One and 8 in Division Two.

Division One sides played five teams both home and away, and four teams either home or away. All Division Two sides played each other home and away. Teams were allowed to field a maximum of two overseas players in a match.

=== Division One ===
Team	Primary home ground	Captain	Coach
Durham	Riverside Ground, Chester-le-Street	(England) Scott Borthwick	(Australia) Ryan Campbell
Essex	County Ground, Chelmsford	(England) Tom Westley	(England) Anthony McGrath
Hampshire	Rose Bowl, Southampton	(England) James Vince	(South Africa) Adi Birrell
Kent	St Lawrence Ground, Canterbury	(England) Daniel Bell-Drummond	(England) Matt Walker
Lancashire	Old Trafford, Manchester	(England) Keaton Jennings	(South Africa) Dale Benkenstein
Nottinghamshire	Trent Bridge, Nottingham	(England) Haseeb Hameed	(England) Peter Moores
Somerset	County Ground, Taunton	(England) Lewis Gregory	(England) Jason Kerr
Surrey	The Oval, London	(England) Rory Burns	(England) Gareth Batty
Warwickshire	Edgbaston, Birmingham	(England) Alex Davies	(England) Mark Robinson
Worcestershire	New Road, Worcester	(England) Brett D'Oliveira	(England) Alan Richardson

Team promoted from Division Two in 2023

=== Division Two ===
Team	Primary home ground	Captain	Coach
Derbyshire	County Ground, Derby	(Wales) David Lloyd	(South Africa) Mickey Arthur
Glamorgan	Sophia Gardens, Cardiff	(England) Sam Northeast	(New Zealand) Grant Bradburn
Gloucestershire	County Ground, Bristol	(South Africa) Graeme van Buuren	(England) Mark Alleyne
Leicestershire	Grace Road, Leicester	(England) Lewis Hill	(South Africa) Alfonso Thomas
Middlesex	Lord's, London	(England) Toby Roland-Jones	(England) Richard Johnson
Northamptonshire	County Ground, Northampton	(England) Luke Procter	(England) John Sadler
Sussex	County Ground, Hove	(England) John Simpson	(England) Paul Farbrace
Yorkshire	Headingley, Leeds	(Pakistan) Shan Masood	(Barbados) Ottis Gibson

Team relegated from Division One in 2023

== Division One results ==
=== April ===
5–8 April 2024 (Round 1 (Note: Wisden distinguishes rounds by date, so that there are 15 rounds even though teams in each division play only 14 matches. Here rounds are numbered according to how many matches have been played.))
Scorecard

Durham	v	Hampshire

Match abandoned
Riverside Ground, Chester-le-Street

- No toss
- No play was possible on all 4 days due to rain and a wet outfield.
- Points: Durham 8, Hampshire 8.

5–8 April 2024 (Round 1)
Scorecard

Kent	v	Somerset
284 (78.4 overs); Joey Evison 85 (116); Lewis Gregory 4/66 (14.4 overs)		403 (110.1 overs); Tom Lammonby 90 (185); Nathan Gilchrist 3/64 (19.1 overs)
290/4d (63 overs); Joe Denly 110 (142); Lewis Goldsworthy 2/73 (15 overs)

Match drawn
St Lawrence Ground, Canterbury
Umpires: Rob Bailey and Russell Warren

- Somerset won the toss and elected to field.
- No play was possible on day 1 due to rain and a wet outfield.
- George Garrett and Matt Parkinson made their debuts for Kent.
- Points: Kent 12, Somerset 15.

5–8 April 2024 (Round 1)
Scorecard

Lancashire	v	Surrey
202 (72.4 overs); Josh Bohannon 84 (155); Cameron Steel 5/25 (9.4 overs)		15/0 (8.3 overs); Dom Sibley 6* (26)

Match drawn
Old Trafford Cricket Ground, Manchester
Umpires: Peter Hartley and Paul Pollard

- Surrey won the toss and elected to field.
- No play was possible on day 1 and day 4 due to rain and a wet outfield. Only 3.3 overs of play were possible on day 3 due to safety concerns caused by high winds, rain and a wet outfield.
- Tom Aspinwall (Lancashire) made his first-class debut.
- Nathan Lyon played his first match for Lancashire.
- Cameron Steel (Surrey) took his maiden five-wicket haul in first-class cricket.
- Points: Lancashire 8, Surrey 11.

5–8 April 2024 (Round 1)
Scorecard

Nottinghamshire	v	Essex
293 (82.4 overs); Joe Clarke 104 (185); Sam Cook 4/59 (18 overs)		253 (79.1 overs); Jordan Cox 84 (150); Dane Paterson 5/49 (14 overs)
80 (34.3 overs); Joe Clarke 19 (41); Sam Cook 6/14 (14 overs)		374/9d (97 overs); Paul Walter 79 (105); Brett Hutton 3/73 (24 overs)

Essex won by 254 runs
Trent Bridge, Nottingham
Umpires: Tom Lungley and Steve O'Shaughnessy

- Nottinghamshire won the toss and elected to field.
- Jordan Cox and Dean Elgar made their debuts for Essex, as did Jack Haynes for Nottinghamshire.
- Cook took a hat-trick in Nottinghamshire's first innings.
- Essex had 12 points deducted for use of an oversize bat by Feroze Khushi.
- Points: Nottinghamshire 4, Essex 8.

5–8 April 2024 (Round 1)
Scorecard

Worcestershire	v	Warwickshire
360 (107.1 overs); Kashif Ali 110 (188); Chris Rushworth 3/97 (23 overs)		333 (94.1 overs); Ed Barnard 89 (124); Nathan Smith 3/49 (21 overs)
295/3 (69 overs); Kashif Ali 133 (128); Oliver Hannon-Dalby 2/52 (20 overs)

Match drawn
Edgbaston, Birmingham
Umpires: Graham Lloyd and Martin Saggers

- Warwickshire won the toss and elected to field.
- Michael Booth (Warwickshire) made his first-class debut.
- Jason Holder and Nathan Smith made their debuts for Worcestershire. Rob Jones played his first Championship match for the county, having been a member of their One-Day Cup squad in 2023 whilst on loan from Lancashire.
- Kashif Ali (Worcestershire) scored his maiden century in first-class cricket, and a century in each innings for the first time
- Points: Warwickshire 13, Worcestershire 14.

12–15 April 2024 (Round 2)
Scorecard

Essex	v	Kent
530/7d (112 overs); Matt Critchley 151* (212); George Garrett 2/80 (23 overs)		413 (135.1 overs); Ben Compton 165 (363); Matt Critchley 5/105 (29 overs)
257/4d (40 overs); Jordan Cox 116* (89); Wes Agar 2/47 (9 overs)		164/7 (67.4 overs); Jaydn Denly 41* (128); Jamie Porter 4/20 (11 overs)

Match drawn
County Ground, Chelmsford
Umpires: Ian Blackwell and Graham Lloyd

- Essex won the toss and elected to bat.
- Only 67.4 overs were possible on day 4 due to rain.
- Matt Critchley hit a career-best score in Essex's first innings.
- In Kent's first innings, Shane Snater bowled Joe Denly for 16 runs to claim his 100th first-class wicket, and Nathan Gilchrist hit a career-best score of 41 (off 64 balls).
- Jordan Cox scored his first century for Essex in the club's second innings.
- In Kent's second innings, Jaydn Denly, making his first-class debut, contributed to a sixth-wicket stand of 51 (off 96 balls) with his uncle, Joe Denly.
- Points: Essex 15, Kent 12

12–15 April 2024 (Round 2)
Scorecard

Hampshire	v	Lancashire
367 (116.1 overs); Liam Dawson 86 (170); Nathan Lyon 3/110 (38.1 overs)		484 (145.3 overs); Keaton Jennings 172 (297); Liam Dawson 4/156 (49 overs)
179/4 (70.1 overs); Nick Gubbins 69* (179); Will Williams 2/26 (10 overs)

Match drawn
Rose Bowl, Southampton
Umpires: Mike Burns and Russell Warren

- Hampshire won the toss and elected to bat.
- Only 49.1 overs were possible on day 4 due to rain.
- Ali Orr (previously with Sussex) made his debut for Hampshire.
- In Hampshire"s second innings, George Bell was run out when requiring only one run to score his maiden first-class century.
- Points: Hampshire 12, Lancashire 13

12–15 April 2024 (Round 2)
Scorecard

Nottinghamshire	v	Worcestershire
399 (128.2 overs); Joe Clarke 105 (185); Nathan Smith 3/67 (22 overs)		355 (108.3 overs); Rob Jones 90 (142); Calvin Harrison 5/128 (36.3 overs)
151/7 (48 overs); Ben Duckett 63 (87); Nathan Smith 4/29 (11 overs)

Match drawn
Trent Bridge, Nottingham
Umpires: Ben Debenham and Alex Wharf

- Nottinghamshire won the toss and elected to bat.
- No play was possible on day 4 due to rain.
- Calvin Harrison (Nottinghamshire) took his maiden five-wicket haul in first-class cricket.
- Points: Nottinghamshire 14, Worcestershire 13

12–15 April 2024 (Round 2)
Scorecard

Somerset	v	Surrey
285 (78.1 overs); Tom Lammonby 100 (133); Cameron Steel 4/50 (12.1 overs)		428 (135.2 overs); Dom Sibley 100 (215); Kasey Aldridge 5/64 (24 overs)
351 (69 overs); Lewis Gregory 80 (188); Cameron Steel 5/96 (35.4 overs)		123/5 (14 overs); Dan Lawrence 53* (34); Kasey Aldridge 3/14 (3 overs)

Match drawn
The Oval, London
Umpires: Richard Kettleborough and Martin Saggers

- Surrey won the toss and elected to field.
- Only 69.4 overs were possible on day 4 due to rain.
- Points: Surrey 14, Somerset 11.

12–15 April 2024 (Round 2)
Scorecard

Warwickshire	v	Durham
698/3d (134 overs); Alex Davies 256 (311); Callum Parkinson 2/206 (40 overs)		517 (139.5 overs); Alex Lees 145 (240); Rob Yates 4/137 (42 overs)
		293/6 (84 overs) (f/o); Matthew Potts 149* (254); Rob Yates 3/121 (32 overs)

Match drawn
Edgbaston, Birmingham
Umpires: Richard Illingworth and Steve O'Shaughnessy

- Durham won the toss and elected to field.
- Alex Davies scored his maiden double-century in first-class cricket, contributing to Warwickshire's second highest ever total.
- Matthew Potts (Durham) scored his maiden century in first-class cricket.
- Jacob Bethell (Warwickshire) took his maiden first-class wicket.
- Points: Warwickshire 15, Durham 11.

19–22 April 2024 (Round 3)
Scorecard

Lancashire	v	Essex
146 (42 overs); Will Williams 32* (29); Shane Snater 4/42 (13 overs)		377 (103.2 overs); Tom Westley 81 (138); George Balderson 3/75 (19 overs)
107 (40.3 overs); George Bell 35 (40); Shane Snater 3/17 (8 overs)

Essex won by an innings and 124 runs
County Ground, Chelmsford
Umpires: James Middlebrook and Alex Wharf

- Essex won the toss and elected to field.
- Only 54 overs were possible on day 1 due to rain.
- Noah Thain (Essex) made his first-class debut, claiming a wicket with his third delivery.
- Essex fielded Ronnie McKenna as substitute wicketkeeper on day 3 due to an injury sustained by Michael Pepper the previous night.
- Points: Essex 22, Lancashire 3.

19–22 April 2024 (Round 3)
Scorecard

Warwickshire	v	Hampshire
455 (133.1 overs); Alex Davies 149 (229); Liam Dawson 5/146 (40.1 overs)		365 (134.4 overs); Nick Gubbins 119 (241); Rob Yates 4/37 (19 overs)
205/4 (49 overs); Rob Yates 84* (136); Liam Dawson 2/72 (18 overs)

Match drawn
Rose Bowl, Southampton
Umpires: Rob Bailey and Martin Saggers

- Warwickshire won the toss and elected to bat.
- Only 34 overs were possible on day 4 due to rain.
- Fletcha Middleton (Hampshire) scored his maiden century in first-class cricket.
- Points: Hampshire 10, Warwickshire 13.

19–22 April 2024 (Round 3)
Scorecard

Kent	v	Surrey
244 (81.4 overs); Daniel Bell-Drummond 70 (109); Cameron Steel 3/34 (15 overs)		543/7d (114 overs); Dom Sibley 150 (253); Matt Parkinson 5/177 (36 overs)
262 (86.2 overs); Joey Evison 53 (119); Daniel Worrall 4/31 (19 overs)

Surrey won by an innings and 37 runs
St Lawrence Ground, Canterbury
Umpires: Mike Burns and Ben Debenham

- Surrey won the toss and elected to field.
- Only 39 overs were possible on day 1 due to rain.
- George Garrett hit a career-best score of 48 in Kent's first innings, whilst in their second, Matt Parkinson's score of 39 was his highest in first-class cricket. Two other Kent players, Arafat Bhuiyan and Jaskaran Singh, also hit career-best scores during the match.
- Points: Kent 2, Surrey 24.

19–22 April 2024 (Round 3)
Scorecard

Nottinghamshire	v	Somerset
193 (62.4 overs); Matthew Montgomery 48 (84); Craig Overton 3/57 (18 overs)		454 (112.5 overs); Craig Overton 95* (111); Calvin Harrison 4/93 (22.5 overs)
440/2 (119 overs); Joe Clarke 213* (327); Craig Overton 1/55 (24 overs)

Match drawn
County Ground, Taunton
Umpires: David Millns and Russell Warren

- Nottinghamshire won the toss and elected to bat.
- Only 9 overs were possible on day 4 due to rain.
- Migael Pretorius took his first wicket for Somerset.
- Nottinghamshire's unbroken second-innings partnership of 392 (from 112 overs) between Joe Clarke and Will Young broke the county's record of 367 for the third-wicket, set in 1903. Young finished with a career-best score of 174 not out (from 334 balls).
- Points: Somerset 15, Nottinghamshire 10.

19–22 April 2024 (Round 3)
Scorecard

Durham	v	Worcestershire
244 (61.3 overs); Ollie Robinson 55 (43); Adam Finch 3/37 (10.3 overs)		184 (59.3 overs); Jake Libby 61 (122); Matthew Potts 3/40 (17.3 overs)
397/5d (77 overs); David Bedingham 138 (99); Nathan Smith 2/68 (14 overs)		272 (76.4 overs); Matthew Waite 62 (134); Paul Coughlin 4/45 (16 overs)

Durham won by 185 runs
Chester Road North, Kidderminster (Note: Worcestershire's opening two home games were moved due to flooding at New Road.)
Umpires: Tom Lungley and Paul Pollard

- Durham won the toss and elected to bat.
- Matthew Waite and Nathan Smith's second-innings partnership of 103 (off 173 balls) was Worcestershire's highest for the seventh wicket against Durham.
- Points: Worcestershire 3, Durham 19.

26–29 April 2024 (Round 4)
Scorecard

Durham	v	Essex
358 (91.4 overs); Colin Ackermann 112 (231); Jamie Porter 3/57 (19 overs)		488 (133 overs); Nick Browne 184 (321); Callum Parkinson 5/131 (31 overs)
131/2 (39.2 overs); Alex Lees 48* (123); Jamie Porter 1/9 (6 overs)

Match drawn
Riverside Ground, Chester-le-Street
Umpires: David Millns and Rob White

- Durham won the toss and elected to bat.
- There was no play on day 3 due to rain.
- Callum Parkinson (Durham) took his maiden five-wicket haul.
- Points: Durham 12, Essex 14

26–29 April 2024 (Round 4)
Scorecard

Hampshire	v	Surrey
151 (44.4 overs); Nick Gubbins 45 (114); Jordan Clark 3/29 (9.4 overs)		359 (109.4 overs); Rory Burns 113 (256); Kyle Abbott 4/104 (30 overs)
197 (77.2 overs); Ben Brown 45 (122); Daniel Worrall 5/47 (25.2 overs)

Surrey won by an innings and 11 runs.
The Oval, London
Umpires: Russell Warren and Alex Wharf

- Surrey won the toss and elected to field.
- Only 32 overs were possible on day 3 due to rain.
- Daniel Worrall took his 100th wicket for Surrey.
- Hampshire were deducted 2 points for a slow over rate.
- Points: Surrey 22, Hampshire 1.

26–29 April 2024 (Round 4)
Scorecard

Nottinghamshire	v	Warwickshire
400 (100.1 overs); Ben Duckett 218 (264); Oliver Hannon-Dalby 5/78 (24.1 overs)		361 (105.3 overs); Jacob Bethell 93 (163); Lyndon James 3/65 (15.3 overs)
75/1 (22 overs); Haseeb Hameed 41* (69); Oliver Hannon-Dalby 1/16 (5 overs)

Match drawn
Edgbaston, Birmingham
Umpires: Richard Kettleborough and Paul Pollard

- Nottinghamshire won the toss and elected to bat.
- Only 34.2 overs on day 2 and 35 overs on day 3 were possible due to rain.
- Aamer Jamal made his debut for Warwickshire, for whom Oliver Hannon-Dalby made his 200th appearance.
- Jacob Bethell (Warwickshire) posted a career-best total.
- Points: Warwickshire 14, Nottinghamshire 15.

26–29 April 2024 (Round 4)
Scorecard

Somerset	v	Worcestershire
309/9d (89 overs); Tom Banton 92 (140); Jason Holder 3/72 (19 overs)		451/9d (115 overs); Gareth Roderick 112 (220); Jake Ball 3/72 (26 overs)
190/4 (75 overs); Tom Lammonby 81* (171); Brett D'Oliveira 1/15 (7 overs)

Match drawn
Chester Road North, Kidderminster
Umpires: Mike Burns and Richard Illingworth

- Worcestershire won the toss and elected to field.
- Rain and bad light restricted play to 29 overs on day 2, and only 86 overs were possible on day 3 due to a wet outfield.
- Points: Worcestershire 15, Somerset 12.

=== May ===
3–6 May 2024 (Round 4)
Scorecard

Kent	v	Lancashire
261 (85.1 overs); Joey Evison 71* (150); Will Williams 3/44 (19.1 overs)		92 (30 overs); Matthew Hurst 36 (46); Nathan Gilchrist 6/24 (8 overs)
166/3 (50.2 overs); Daniel Bell-Drummond 79* (156); Nathan Lyon 2/48 (22 overs)		332 (106.3 overs) (f/o); George Bell 65 (143); Wes Agar 3/65 (21 overs)

Kent won by 7 wickets.
Old Trafford Cricket Ground, Manchester
Umpires: Graham Lloyd and Paul Pollard

- Lancashire won the toss and elected to field.
- Only 69 overs on day 1, and 75.1 overs on day 2 were possible due to rain.
- Will Williams took his 200th first-class wicket in Kent's first innings.
- Nathan Gilchrist posted career-best figures in Lancashire's first innings.
- Points: Lancashire 3, Kent 20

3–6 May 2024 (Round 5)
Scorecard

Essex	v	Somerset
156 (51 overs); Tom Westley 43 (84); Migael Pretorius 4/36 (12 overs)		128 (41.4 overs); Tom Lammonby 38 (116); Jamie Porter 5/37 (16 overs)
138 (51.3 overs); Jordan Cox 27 (84); Josh Davey 3/20 (11 overs)		170/7 (44.1 overs); Sean Dickson 42 (40); Shane Snater 4/55 (12 overs)

Somerset won by 3 wickets
County Ground, Taunton
Umpires: James Middlebrook and Alex Wharf

- Somerset won the toss and elected to field.
- Points: Somerset 19, Essex 3.

10–13 May 2024 (Round 5)
Scorecard

Hampshire	v	Durham
503 (146.4 overs); Ali Orr 126 (211); Callum Parkinson 4/176 (43 overs)		432 (148.5 overs); David Bedingham 144 (294); Liam Dawson 5/184 (66 overs)
62/2 (37 overs); James Vince 35* (108); Matthew Potts 2/19 (10 overs)

Match drawn
Rose Bowl, Southampton
Umpires: Russell Warren and Alex Wharf

- Hampshire won the toss and elected to bat.
- Only 45.5 overs were possible on day 4 due to rain,
- Ali Orr scored his maiden century for Hampshire.
- Points: Hampshire 13, Durham 11

10–13 May 2024 (Round 5)
Scorecard

Worcestershire	v	Kent
618/7d (158.5 overs); Jason Holder 123* (110); Joey Evison 3/58 (26 overs)		407 (149.2 overs); Jack Leaning 179* (403); Joe Leach 3/37 (25 overs)
		146/4 (57 overs) (f/o); Harry Finch 48* (116); Ben Gibbon 2/38 (10 overs)

Match drawn
St Lawrence Ground, Canterbury
Umpires: Mike Burns and Ben Debenham

- Worcestershire won the toss and elected to bat.
- Jack Leaning's 179 runs were accumulated in 9 hours and 48 minutes, making his innings the second longest in Kent's history.
- Beyers Swanepoel made his Kent debut.
- Points: Kent 10, Worcestershire 13

10–13 May 2024 (Round 5)
Scorecard

Lancashire	v	Nottinghamshire
331 (100.2 overs); Keaton Jennings 91 (180); Olly Stone 3/56 (23.2 overs)		503 (153.4 overs); Haseeb Hameed 247* (459); George Balderson 4/102 (30 overs)
252 (74.3 overs); Matthew Hurst 104 (158); Dillon Pennington 4/61 (19 overs)		81/1 (18.4 overs); Ben Slater 31 (32); Saqib Mahmood 1/22 (5 overs)

Nottinghamshire won by 9 wickets.
Trent Bridge, Nottingham
Umpires: Richard Kettleborough and Tom Lungley

- Lancashire won the toss and elected to bat.
- Haseeb Hameed hit his maiden double-century in first-class cricket, breaking Nottinghamshire's 74-year-old record for the highest score by a player who carried their bat.
- Matthew Hurst (Lancashire) scored his maiden first-class century.
- Points: Nottinghamshire 22, Lancashire 4.

10–13 May 2024 (Round 5)
Scorecard

Warwickshire	v	Surrey
343 (102.5 overs); Ed Barnard 108 (179); Jordan Clark 4/65 (24 overs)		464 (111.4 overs); Jamie Smith 155 (179); Craig Miles 5/43 (14 overs)
209 (59 overs); Rob Yates 52 (68); Kemar Roach 6/46 (14 overs)		89/1 (22.4 overs); Dom Sibley 46* (79); Jacob Bethell 1/38 (8 overs)

Surrey won by 9 wickets
The Oval, London
Umpires: Rob Bailey and Steve O'Shaughnessy

- Surrey won the toss and elected to field.
- Jamie Smith and Sean Abbott's first-innings partnership of 115 (off 110 balls) surpassed the previous Surrey record of 107 for the ninth wicket against Warwickshire, set in 1926 by Douglas Jardine and Ted Brooks.
- Points: Surrey 24, Warwickshire 4

17–20 May 2024 (Round 6)
Scorecard

Warwickshire	v	Essex
397 (117.4 overs); Ed Barnard 165 (285); Shane Snater 3/58 (25 overs)		162 (51.2 overs); Jordan Cox 47 (60); Che Simmons 3/12 (7 overs)
94 (37.1 overs); Rob Yates 28 (44); Matt Critchley 4/24 (9 overs)		331/6 (97.2 overs); Jordan Cox 112 (192); Michael Rae 3/86 (20 overs)

Essex won by 4 wickets
County Ground, Chelmsford
Umpires: Ben Debenham and James Middlebrook

- Warwickshire won the toss and elected to bat.
- Che Simmons (Warwickshire) made his first-class debut.
- Michael Rae played his first match for Warwickshire.
- In Warwickshire's first innings, Ed Barnard and Michael Burgess broke the county's record for the seventh wicket against Essex, adding 209 runs in 352 deliveries.
- Points: Warwickshire 6, Essex 18

17–20 May 2024 (Round 6)
Scorecard

Lancashire	v	Durham
357 (98 overs); Keaton Jennings 115 (155); Ben Raine 3/67 (24 overs)		236 (68.4 overs); David Bedingham 101 (151); Tom Aspinwall 5/41 (9.4 overs)
353/9d (83.1 overs); Keaton Jennings 155 (213); Ben Stokes 5/98 (20 overs)		414 (93 overs); Ollie Robinson 171* ( George Balderson 4/52 (13 overs)

Lancashire won by 16 runs
Stanley Park, Blackpool
Umpires: Rob Bailey and Richard Illingworth

- Durham won the toss and elected to field.
- Tom Aspinwall (Lancashire) took his maiden five-wicket haul in first-class cricket.
- Points: Lancashire 22, Durham 3

17–20 May 2024 (Round 6)
Scorecard

Nottinghamshire	v	Hampshire
235 (103.1 overs); Lyndon James 106* (246); Mohammad Abbas 4/49 (27 overs)		276 (68.1 overs); Liam Dawson 95 (158); Olly Stone 4/62 (16 overs)
209 (79.2 overs); Jack Haynes 59 (127); Felix Organ 3/38 (12.2 overs)		171/5 (51 overs); James Fuller 77* (97); Dane Paterson 2/31 (15 overs)

Hampshire won by 5 wickets
Trent Bridge, Nottingham
Umpires: Nigel Llong and Steve O'Shaughnessy

- Hampshire won the toss and elected to field.
- Points: Nottinghamshire 3, Hampshire 20

17–20 May 2024 (Round 6)
Scorecard

Somerset	v	Kent
554 (120.1 overs); Tom Banton 133 (174); Joey Evison 3/92 (21.5 overs)		178 (48.1 overs); Joe Denly 61 (98); Craig Overton 3/38 (11 overs)
194/2 (44 overs); Matt Renshaw 82* (122); Beyers Swanepoel 1/35 (9 overs)		564 (126 overs) (f/o); Zak Crawley 238 (267); Migael Pretorius 3/110 (25 overs)

Somerset won by 8 wickets
County Ground, Taunton
Umpires: Neil Mallender and Rob White

- Kent won the toss and elected to field.
- Points: Somerset 24, Kent 2

17–20 May 2024 (Round 6)
Scorecard

Surrey	v	Worcestershire
213 (54.1 overs); Dan Lawrence 84 (102); Matthew Waite 3/19 (12 overs)		128 (42 overs); Matthew Waite 35 (42); Daniel Worrall 6/22 (12 overs)
427 (103.3 overs); Jordan Clark 98 (116); Yadvinder Singh 4/103 (19.3 overs)		231 (57.3 overs); Ben Gibbon 75 (63); Daniel Worrall 4/35 (16 overs)

Surrey won by 281 runs
The Oval, London
Umpires: Ian Blackwell and Graham Lloyd

- Worcestershire won the toss and elected to field.
- Yadvinder Singh (Worcestershire) made his first-class debut.
- Points: Surrey 19, Worcestershire 3

24–27 May 2024 (Round 7)
Scorecard

Somerset	v	Durham
171 (52.1 overs); Migael Pretorius 53 (63); Ben Stokes 4/54 (15.1 overs)		265 (61.5 overs); David Bedingham 101 (114); Jake Ball 5/62 (20 overs)
88 (33.4 overs); Andrew Umeed 16 (26); Ben Stokes 4/23 (10 overs)

Durham won by an innings and 6 runs
Riverside Ground, Chester-le-Street
Umpires: Jack Shantry and Peter Hartley

- Durham won the toss and elected to field.
- Durham were deducted 1 point due to a slow over rate.
- Points: Durham 19, Somerset 3

24–27 May 2024 (Round 7)
Scorecard

Surrey	v	Hampshire
127 (46.3 overs); Rory Burns 33 (73); Kyle Abbott 5/25 (11 overs)		608/8d (161 overs); Ben Brown 165* (178); Daniel Worrall 2/53 (27 overs)
203 (80.1 overs); Daniel Worrall 48 (57); Felix Organ 5/104 (31 overs)

Hampshire won by an innings and 278 runs
Rose Bowl, Southampton
Umpires: David Millns and James Middlebrook

- Surrey won the toss and elected to bat.
- Hampshire recorded their biggest-ever win in the County Championship, and Surrey their worst defeat.
- Toby Albert (Hampshire) scored his maiden first-class century. His partnership with Nick Gubbins of 201 runs (off 74.2 overs) was a club record for the second wicket against Surrey.
- Ben Brown (Hampshire) hit his highest first-class score.
- Points: Hampshire 21, Surrey 1

24–27 May 2024 (Round 7)
Scorecard

Essex	v	Kent
519/7d (142.4 overs); Jordan Cox 207 (255); Joey Evison 2/93 (29 overs)		394 (143.1 overs); Joe Denly 87 (179); Matt Critchley 5/88 (40.1 overs)
		101 (57.2 overs) (f/o); Joe Denly 23 (73); Simon Harmer 4/32 (23 overs)

Essex won by an innings and 96 runs
St Lawrence Ground, Canterbury
Umpires: Mark Newell and Tom Lungley

- Essex won the toss and elected to bat.
- Shane Snater (Essex) hit a career-best 83 not out (from 84 balls).
- Points: Kent 3, Essex 21

24–27 May 2024 (Round 7)
Scorecard

Warwickshire	v	Lancashire
284 (110.5 overs); Alex Davies 127* (296); Tom Bailey 3/49 (24 overs)		149 (65.5 overs); George Bell 40 (74); Jacob Bethell 4/20 (16 overs)
96/3d (24 overs); Ed Barnard 40* (46); George Balderson 1/9 (6 overs)		89/4 (15 overs); Tom Bruce 31* (22); Michael Rae 3/39 (6 overs)

Match drawn
Old Trafford Cricket Ground, Manchester
Umpires: Ian Blackwell and Rob White

- Warwickshire won the toss and elected to bat.
- Only 39 overs on day 1, 50.5 overs on day 3 and 15 overs on day 4 were possible due to rain.
- Points: Lancashire 11, Warwickshire 12

24–27 May 2024 (Round 7)
Scorecard

Worcestershire	v	Nottinghamshire
80 (31.1 overs); Rob Jones 19 (29); Luke Fletcher 3/18 (9 overs)		234/3 (72 overs); Haseeb Hameed 100 (219); Nathan Smith 2/31 (14 overs)

Match drawn
New Road, Worcester
Umpires: Nigel Llong and Surendiran Shanmugam

- Nottinghamshire won the toss and elected to field.
- No play was possible on day 1 due to a wet outfield. There was also no play on days 3 and 4 due to rain and a wet outfield.
- Points: Worcestershire: 9, Nottinghamshire 11

=== June ===
23–26 June 2024 (Round 8)
Scorecard

Essex	v	Durham
339 (99 overs); Paul Walter 134 (181); Matthew Potts 4/71 (21 overs)		587 (122 overs); Ollie Robinson 198 (209); Matt Critchley 4/158 (26 overs)
184/8d (52 overs); Scott Borthwick 71 (146); Simon Harmer 4/75 (21 overs)		208/2 (85 overs); Dean Elgar 120* (232); Matthew Potts 2/38 (19 overs)

Match drawn
County Ground, Chelmsford
Umpires: Martin Saggers and Paul Pollard

- Durham won the toss and elected to bat.
- Ollie Robinson (Durham) made his highest first-class score.
- Points: Essex 4, Durham 16

23–26 June 2024 (Round 8)
Scorecard

Kent	v	Lancashire
244 (79.1 overs); Tawanda Muyeye 59 (121); George Balderson 3/38 (16 overs)		549/9d (150.4 overs); Josh Bohannon 205 (372); George Garrett 3/89 (20.4 overs)
222 (83.2 overs); Charlie Stobo 64 (151); Will Williams 3/26 (14.2 overs)

Lancashire won by an innings and 83 runs
St Lawrence Ground, Canterbury
Umpires: David Millns and James Middlebrook

- Luke Wells and Josh Bohannon's partnership of 312 was Lancashire's highest ever against Kent.
- On his Kent debut, Charlie Stobo took his maiden Championship wicket, and in the county's second innings, recorded his highest first-class score.
- Points: Kent 1, Lancashire 23

23–26 June 2024 (Round 8)
Scorecard

Nottinghamshire	v	Somerset
360 (105 overs); Olly Stone 83 (148); Kasey Aldridge 5/94 (23 overs)		470 (121 overs); Tom Abell 111 (230); Dillon Pennington 5/96 (25 overs)
425/2d (130 overs); Ben Slater 168 (377); Craig Overton 1/34 (14 overs)

Match drawn
Trent Bridge, Nottingham
Umpires: Ben Debenham and Neil Mallender

- Nottinghamshire won the toss and elected to bat.
- Dillon Pennington took his first five-wicket haul for Nottinghamshire.
- Points: Nottinghamshire 13, Somerset 15

23–26 June 2024 (Round 8)
Scorecard

Warwickshire	v	Hampshire
254 (72.5 overs); Jacob Bethell 69 (140); Keith Barker 6/74 (20 overs)		298 (81.4 overs); Fletcha Middleton 74 (135); Oliver Hannon-Dalby 3/35 (16 overs)
321/9 (108 overs); Sam Hain 111* (254); James Fuller 3/55 (16 overs)		453/6d (117 overs); James Vince 166* (197); Oliver Hannon-Dalby 3/65 (18 overs)

Match drawn
Edgbaston, Birmingham
Umpires: Peter Hartley and Steve O'Shaughnessy

- Hampshire won the toss and elected to bat.
- Points: Warwickshire 12, Hampshire 12

23–26 June 2024 (Round 8)
Scorecard

Worcestershire	v	Surrey
212 (85.3 overs); Jake Libby 77 (211); James Taylor 3/19 (8.3 overs)		490 (131.1 overs); Dan Lawrence 175 (223); Tom Taylor 3/99 (24 overs)
273 (92 overs) (f/o); Kashif Ali 66 (106); Jordan Clark 5/65 (18 overs)

Surrey won by an innings and 5 runs.
New Road, Worcester
Umpires: Mike Burns and Surendiran Shanmugam

- Worcestershire won the toss and elected to field.
- Points: Worcestershire 2, Surrey 22

30 June–3 July 2024 (Round 9)
Scorecard

Durham	v	Worcestershire
190 (48.3 overs); Ben Stokes 56 (79); Nathan Smith 4/36 (11.3 overs)		112 (33 overs); Kashif Ali 55 (81); Matthew Potts 4/29 (8 overs)
152 (50.1 overs); Colin Ackermann 40 (87); Tom Taylor 4/48 (16 overs)		231/4 (61.2 overs); Kashif Ali 76* (118); Ben Stokes 2/70 (18 overs)

Worcestershire won by 6 wickets
Riverside Ground, Chester-le-Street
Umpires: Steve O'Shaughnessy and Surendiran Shanmugam

- Worcestershire won the toss and elected to field.
- Only 35.2 overs were possible on day 2 due to rain.
- Points: Durham 3, Worcestershire 19

30 June–3 July 2024 (Round 9)
Scorecard

Hampshire	v	Kent
505/8d (130 overs); James Vince 211 (279); Joey Evison 4/83 (19 overs)		343 (99.3 overs); Jack Leaning 118 (228); Keith Barker 4/85 (24.3 overs)
180/4 (22.1 overs); Ben Compton 92 (210); Kyle Abbott 5/89 (25.2 overs)		340 (118.2 overs) (f/o); Liam Dawson 56* (28); Matt Parkinson 2/48 (6 overs)

Hampshire won by 6 wickets
Rose Bowl, Southampton
Umpires: Ben Debenham and Paul Pollard

- Kent won the toss and elected to field.
- Only 83 overs were possible on day 1 due to rain.
- James Vince and Ben Brown's partnership of 259 (off 408 balls) in Hampshire's first innings was the county's highest for the fourth wicket against Kent.
- Points: Hampshire 23, Kent 4

30 June–3 July 2024 (Round 9)
Scorecard

Lancashire	v	Nottinghamshire
353/9d (97 overs); Keaton Jennings 187* (259); Lyndon James 4/61 (18 overs)		126 (44.4 overs); Ben Slater 64* (126); James Anderson 7/35 (16 overs)
		270/4d (102 overs) (f/o); Joe Clarke 115* (193); Nathan Lyon 2/65 (27 overs)

Match drawn
Trafalgar Road Ground, Southport
Umpires: Martin Saggers and Tom Lungley

- Nottinghamshire won the toss and elected to field.
- Rain prevented play on day 2, and permitted only 56 overs on day 4.
- Nathan Lyon took his 800th first-class wicket, dismissing Ben Slater lbw for 17 runs in Nottinghamshire's second innings.
- Chris Green took his maiden first-class wicket for Lancashire on his Championship debut.
- Nottinghamshire were deducted 1 point for a slow over rate.
- Points: Lancashire 14, Nottinghamshire 10

30 June–3 July 2024 (Round 9)
Scorecard

Somerset	v	Warwickshire
284 (83.2 overs); Tom Banton 78 (143); Oliver Hannon-Dalby 6/56 (18.2 overs)		412 (109.1 overs); Michael Burgess 147 (208); Migael Pretorius 5/104 (27 overs)
413/5 (91.4 overs); Tom Abell 152* (207); Oliver Hannon-Dalby 2/73 (15 overs)		281/8d (83.2 overs); Jacob Bethell 66 (83); Craig Overton 4/57 (19 overs)

Somerset won by 5 wickets
County Ground, Taunton
Umpires: Mark Newell and Rob Bailey

- Somerset won the toss and elected to field.
- Only 79.1 overs were possible on day 2 due to rain.
- Somerset completed their second highest run chase in the fourth innings of a match.
- Points: Somerset 20, Warwickshire 7

30 June–3 July 2024 (Round 9)
Scorecard

Surrey	v	Essex
262 (83.2 overs); Jamie Smith 100 (133); Shane Snater 3/56 (21.2)		180 (51.3 overs); Paul Walter 64 (104); Jordan Clark 3/33 (15.3)
278 (75 overs); Ryan Patel 107 (125); Eathan Bosch 3/57 (17)		215 (61.1 overs); Dean Elgar 60 (95); Tom Lawes 4/26 (13)

Surrey won by 145 runs
The Oval, London
Umpires: Graham Lloyd and Peter Hartley

- Essex won the toss and elected to field.
- Only 79 overs were possible on day 1 due to rain, and 73.5 overs on day 2 due to bad light. Rain and bad light restricted play on day 3 to 69 overs.
- Jordan Cox left the field before batting on day 1 due to illness, and did not return for the remainder of the match.
- Points: Surrey 20, Essex 3

=== August ===
22–25 August 2024 (Round 10)
Scorecard

Durham	v	Nottinghamshire
531/7d (117.2 overs); Alex Lees 145 (275); Lyndon James 3/84 (21 overs)		229 (78.3 overs); Lyndon James 56 (137); Neil Wagner 4/68 (18 overs)
		285 (117 overs) (f/o); Jack Haynes 69 (172); Daniel Hogg 7/66 (25 overs)

Durham won by an innings and 17 runs
Riverside Ground, Chester-le-Street
Umpires: Paul Baldwin and Peter Hartley

- Nottinghamshire won the toss and elected to field.
- Durham's Daniel Hogg took a maiden five-wicket haul on his first-class debut, whilst Ashton Turner scored a century in his first match for the county.
- Freddie McCann (Nottinghamshire) made his first-class debut.
- Ben McKinney scored his maiden hundred from 117 balls, in his second Championship game.
- Points: Durham 24, Nottinghamshire 2

22–25 August 2024 (Round 10)
Scorecard

Hampshire	v	Essex
424/8d (105.5 overs); Tom Prest 156 (177); Matt Critchley 5/96 (15.5 overs)		438/8d (109.4 overs); Jordan Cox 141 (124); Mohammad Abbas 3/76 (26 overs)

Match drawn
Rose Bowl, Southampton
Umpires: Ian Blackwell and Martin Saggers

- Hampshire won the toss and elected to field.
- No play was possible on day 1 due to rain.
- Points: Hampshire 14, Essex 14

22–25 August 2024 (Round 10)
Scorecard

Surrey	v	Lancashire
444/9d (114 overs); Rory Burns 227 (348); Tom Aspinwall 3/88 (18 overs)		204 (58.4 overs); Matthew Hurst 46 (64); Jordan Clark 4/57 (13.4 overs)
		177 (62 overs); Matthew Hurst 64 (116); Conor McKerr 4/27 (9 overs)

Surrey won by an innings and 63 runs
The Oval, London
Umpires: David Millns and Rob White

- Surrey won the toss and elected to field.
- Josh Boyden and 16-year-old Rocky Flintoff (Lancashire) both made their first-class debuts, with Flintoff becoming the youngest player to represent the county at this level.
- Indian batter Sai Sudharsan returned to Surrey for the first of two matches.
- Points: Surrey 23, Lancashire 2

22–25 August 2024 (Round 10)
Scorecard

Warwickshire	v	Somerset
337 (86.1 overs); Michael Burgess 69 (90); Josh Davey 4/80 (22 overs)		239 (65.1 overs); Kasey Aldridge 84 (139); Ed Barnard 5/54 (16.1 overs)
270 (89 overs); Alex Davies 131 (225); Jack Leach 5/77 (24 overs)		206/4 (35 overs); James Rew 55* (24); Michael Rae 3/39 (10 overs)

Match drawn
Edgbaston, Birmingham
Umpires: Steve O'Shaughnessy and Alex Wharf

- Somerset won the toss and elected to field.
- Points: Warwickshire 13, Somerset 11

22–25 August 2024 (Round 10)
Scorecard

Worcestershire	v	Kent
447 (115.1 overs); Brett D'Oliveira 97 (90); Akeem Jordan 5/97 (26.1 overs)		171 (49.5 overs); Tawanda Muyeye 56 (64); Joe Leach 6/52 (11.5 overs)
102/2 (24.3 overs); Kashif Ali 52* (67); George Garrett 1/15 (7 overs)		376 (101.5 overs); Tawanda Muyeye 211 (279); Tom Taylor 4/99 (27 overs)

Worcestershire won by 8 wickets
New Road, Worcester
Umpires: Mark Newell and Paul Pollard

- Worcestershire won the toss and elected to field.
- Akeem Jordan made his Kent debut, after signing a four-match deal with the club.
- Alfie Osbourne (Kent) was on loan from Somerset, for the first of two matches.
- Points: Worcestnershire 23, Kent 3

29 August–1 September 2024 (Round 11)
Scorecard

Essex	v	Worcestershire
404 (107.3 overs); Michael Pepper 112* (125); Ethan Brookes 3/34 (10 overs)		266 (75 overs); Brett D'Oliveira 68 (136); Jamie Porter 5/52 (17 overs)
140 (46.3 overs); Robin Das 32 (67); Logan van Beek 4/26 (9.3 overs)		321 (86 overs); Jake Libby 65 (112); Sam Cook 4/23 (15 overs)

Worcestershire won by 43 runs
County Ground, Chelmsford
Umpires: David Millns and Steve O'Shaughnessy

- Worcestershire won the toss and elected to bat.
- Michael Pepper (Essex) scored his maiden first-class century.
- Points: Essex 7, Worcestershire 20

29 August–1 September 2024 (Round 11)
Scorecard

Lancashire	v	Hampshire
200 (77.3 overs); Keaton Jennings 56 (131); Liam Dawson 5/47 (28.3 overs)		389 (114 overs); Fletcha Middleton 109 (190); Luke Wells 4/94 (25 overs)
152 (77.3 overs) (f/o); Luke Wells 51 (148); Liam Dawson 5/52 (29.3 overs)

Hampshire won by an innings and 37 runs
Old Trafford Cricket Ground, Manchester
Umpires: Ben Debenham and Tom Lungley

- Lancashire won the toss and elected to field.
- Lancashire suffered successive innings defeats for the first time since 1907, with Hampshire winning by an innings for only the third time out of the 158 occasions on which the two sides had met in the competition since 1870.
- Points: Lancashire 3, Hampshire 22

29 August–1 September 2024 (Round 11)
Scorecard

Nottinghamshire	v	Surrey
405 (114.5 overs); Freddie McCann 154 (268); Will Jacks 7/129 (43.5 overs)		525 (150.4 overs); Rory Burns 161 (266); Farhan Ahmed 7/140 (50.4 overs)
121/0 (33 overs); Haseeb Hameed 61 (93); Jordan Clark 0/2 (1 over)		177/9d (53 overs); Rory Burns 71 (131); Liam Patterson-White 5/96 (27 overs)

Match drawn
Trent Bridge, Nottingham
Umpires: James Middlebrook and Paul Pollard

- Surrey won the toss and elected to bat.
- Robert Lord (Nottinghamshire) made his first-class debut.
- In his Championship debut, Farhan Ahmed became the youngest first-class player in Nottinghamshire's history at the age of 16 years and 189 days, breaking a record which had stood for 177 years. In Surrey's first innings, he then became the youngest player to take a five-wicket haul in a first-class match in England. In their second, he also broke the record set by W. G. Grace in 1865 as the youngest player to take ten wickets in an English first-class match, which was one of the longest-standing in the domestic game.
- South African Kyle Verreynne (Nottinghamshire) made his Championship debut.
- Freddie McCann (Nottinghamshire) scored a maiden first-class century in his third innings.
- Points: Nottinghamshire 12, Surrey 13

29 August–1 September 2024 (Round 11)
Scorecard

Somerset	v	Durham
492 (116.2 overs); Tom Abell 124 (181); Jack Leach 5/124 (41.1 overs)		336 (100.1 overs); Brydon Carse 104* (161); Callum Parkinson 4/136 (35.2 overs)
263/5d Tom Abell 56 (75); Callum Parkinson 2/143 (26 overs)		126 (60.3 overs); George Drissell 33 (70); Jack Leach 7/50 (30.3 overs)

Somerset won by 293 runs
County Ground, Taunton
Umpires: Rob Bailey and Mike Burns

- Somerset won the toss and elected to bat.
- Archie Vaughan (Somerset) made his first-class debut, and took his maiden first-class wicket in Durham's first innings.
- In Somerset's first innings, Tom Abell and James Rew set a county record for the fourth-wicket against Durham of 185 runs (from 275 deliveries).
- Points: Somerset 24, Durham 4

29 August–1 September 2024 (Round 11)
Scorecard

Warwickshire	v	Kent
420 (107 overs); Will Rhodes 201 (295); George Garrett 3/75 (15 overs)		156 (39.5 overs); Ben Compton 70 (103); Michael Booth 3/13 (4 overs)
		243 (69.3 overs); Daniel Bell-Drummond 78 (94); Oliver Hannon-Dalby 6/43 (19 overs)

Warwickshire won by an innings and 21 runs
Edgbaston, Birmingham
Umpires: Peter Hartley and Alex Wharf

- Warwickshire won the toss and elected to field.
- Kent were deducted 1 point for a slow over rate.
- Points: Warwickshire 23, Kent 2

=== September ===
9–12 September 2024 (Round 12)
Scorecard

Lancashire	v	Durham
228 (94.3 overs); Matthew Hurst 90 (198); Ben Raine 5/44 (25 overs)		573/9d (135.3 overs); David Bedingham 279 (359); Luke Wells 4/69 (13.3 overs)
282 (80.2 overs); Matthew Hurst 67 (125); Matthew Potts 9/68 (24.2 overs)

Durham won by an innings and 63 runs
Riverside Ground, Chester-le-Street
Umpires: Michael Gough and Graham Lloyd

- Durham won the toss and elected to field.
- David Bedingham's individual score was the highest in Durham's first-class history, surpassing Martin Love's 2003 record by six runs. His fifth-wicket partnership with Colin Ackermann of 424 (from 97.8 overs) was also the county's highest for any wicket at first-class level.
- Matthew Potts returned career-best bowling figures in Lancashire's second innings, during which he dismissed three members of the opposing side in four balls. His performance was the best of the season in either division.
- Points: Lancashire 1, Durham 24

9–12 September 2024 (Round 12)
Scorecard

Essex	v	Nottinghamshire
457 (118.3 overs); Tom Westley 122 (241); Robert Lord 3/88 (23 overs)		93 (40.5 overs); Ben Slater 29 (70); Jamie Porter 5/35 (10 overs)
		281 (93.2 overs) (f/o); Haseeb Hameed 105 (166); Simon Harmer 4/93 (40 overs)

Essex won by an innings and 83 runs
County Ground, Chelmsford
Umpires: Peter Hartley and Rob White

- Nottinghamshire won the toss and elected to field.
- Rain restricted play to 74 overs on day 1, and 55.2 overs on day 2.
- Luc Benkenstein (Essex) made his first-class debut.
- Points: Essex 23, Nottinghamshire 2

9–12 September 2024 (Round 12)
Scorecard

Hampshire	v	Kent
403 (106.3 overs); Tom Prest 102 (107); George Garrett 3/76 (21 overs)		207 (82.2 overs); Ben Compton 51 (146); Kyle Abbott 5/46 (16 overs)
24/1 (2.4 overs); James Vince 11 (10); George Garrett 1/17 (1.4 overs)		338 (102.4 overs) (f/o); Jack Leaning 100 (161); Kyle Abbott 4/66 (25 overs)

Match drawn
St Lawrence Ground, Canterbury
Umpires: Ian Blackwell and Paul Pollard

- Kent won the toss and elected to field.
- Rain and bad light restricted play to 61 overs on day 1, and 71.1 overs on day 2. Only 74.1 overs were possible on day 3 due to rain.
- Jack Leaning and Harry Finch's partnership of 149 (from 249 balls) was a Kent record for the sixth wicket against Hampshire.
- Points: Hampshire 15, Kent 11

9–12 September 2024 (Round 12)
Scorecard

Somerset	v	Surrey
317 (95.5 overs); Tom Banton 132 (172); Shakib Al Hasan 4/97 (33.5 overs)		321 (112.2 overs); Tom Curran 86 (75); Archie Vaughan 6/102 (37 overs)
224 (63.3 overs); Craig Overton 49* (78); Shakib Al Hasan 5/96 (29.3 overs)		109 (78 overs); Dom Sibley 56 (183); Jack Leach 5/37 (37 overs)

Somerset won by 111 runs
County Ground, Taunton
Umpires: David Millns and Steve O'Shaughnessy

- Somerset won the toss and elected to bat.
- Only 70 overs were possible on day 2 due to rain.
- New Zealander Brett Randell made his Somerset debut.
- Bangladeshi Skakib Al Hasan made his Surrey debut, having been signed on a one-match deal.
- Appearing in only his second first-class game, Archie Vaughan took his maiden five-wicket haul in Surrey's first innings, then went on to record a maiden ten-wicket haul by taking five wickets in their second. He finished with match figures of 11/140.
- Lying second behind Surrey in the table, Somerset bowled out the visitors with less than five minutes of the match to spare, registering what the Times described as "one of the greatest County Championship victories in their history".
- Points: Somerset 21, Surrey 5

9–12 September 2024 (Round 12)
Scorecard

Worcestershire	v	Warwickshire
307 (100 overs); Brett D'Oliveira 76 (150); Oliver Hannon-Dalby 3/64 (19 overs)		128 (42.2 overs); Alex Davies 58 (72); Tom Taylor 6/28 (11 overs)
		252/3 (86.1 overs) (f/o); Will Rhodes 121* (258); Matthew Waite 1/24 (17 overs)

Match drawn
New Road, Worcester
Umpires: Ben Debenham and James Middlebrook

- Warwickshire won the toss and elected to field.
- Only 37 overs were possible on day 2 due to rain and bad light. Rain restricted play to 62.4 overs on day 3, and 32.5 overs on day 4.
- Jack Home (Worcestershire) made his first-class debut.
- In Warwickshire's first innings, Alex Davies became the first player in division one to pass 1,000 runs for the season.
- Tom Taylor recorded career-best bowling figures during Warwickshire's first innings.
- Points: Worcestershire 13, Warwickshire 11

17–20 September 2024 (Round 13)
Scorecard

Hampshire	v	Worcestershire
462 (111.5 overs); Nick Gubbins 201 (317); Amar Virdi 5/133 (36 overs)		273 (69.4 overs); Ethan Brookes 132 (154); Liam Dawson 5/88 (24.4 overs)
204 (57 overs); Liam Dawson 51 (67); Amar Virdi 4/108 (25 overs)		158 (58.2 overs); Jake Libby 57 (154); Kyle Abbott 5/36 (16.2 overs)

Hampshire won by 235 runs
Rose Bowl, Southampton
Umpires: Mark Newell and Rob White

- Hampshire won the toss and elected to field.
- Points: Hampshire 24, Worcestershire 4

17–20 September 2024 (Round 13)
Scorecard

Kent	v	Nottinghamshire
225 (55.3 overs); Joey Evison 76 (106); Farhan Ahmed 4/37 (15.3 overs)		433 (106.4 overs); Ben Slater 160 (217); Nathan Gilchrist 4/101 (24 overs)
230 (64.4 overs) (f/o); Tawanda Muyeye 60 (59); Jacob Duffy 4/60 (17 overs)		28/0 (3.3 overs); Ben Slater 22* (8 overs); Akeem Jordan 0/12 (1.3 overs)

Nottinghamshire won by 10 wickets
St Lawrence Ground, Canterbury
Umpires: James Middlebrook and Surendiran Shanmugam

- Kent won the toss and elected to field
- Points: Kent 3, Nottinghamshire 23

17–20 September 2024 (Round 13)
Scorecard

Lancashire	v	Somerset
140 (40 overs); Keaton Jennings 56 (68); Craig Overton 4/32 (15 overs)		146 (39.5 overs); Tom Lammonby 36 (64); Tom Bailey 4/36 (11 overs)
398 (140.3 overs); Luke Wells 130 (231); Jack Leach 3/57 (26 overs)		224 (69.3 overs); Archie Vaughan 68 (121); Luke Wells 4/36 (13 overs)

Lancashire won by 168 runs
Old Trafford Cricket Ground, Manchester
Umpires: Martin Saggers and Steve O'Shaughnessy

- Somerset won the toss and elected to field.
- Harry Singh (Lancashire) made his first-class debut.
- Points: Lancashire 19, Somerset 3

17–20 September 2024 (Round 13)
Scorecard

Surrey	v	Durham
415 (103.4 overs); Ryan Patel 134 (183); Bas de Leede 4/106 (26 overs)		262 (81.5 overs); Colin Ackermann 78* (125); Daniel Worrall 4/39 (13.5 overs)
25/0 (5 overs); Rory Burns 13* (18); Chemar Holder 0/7 (3 overs)		177 (55.4 overs); Emilio Gay 48 (98); Sam Curran 4/23 (13.4 overs)

Surrey won by 10 wickets.
The Oval, London
Umpires: Ben Debenham and Nigel Llong

- Surrey won the toss and elected to field.
- At the age of 16 years and 296 days, James Minto became the youngest first-class debutant in Durham's history.
- With this victory on 19 September, and Somerset's defeat by Lancashire the following day, Surrey were confirmed as champions for the third successive year.
- Points: Surrey 23, Durham 4

17–20 September 2024 (Round 13)
Scorecard

Warwickshire	v	Essex
78 (27.4 overs); Will Rhodes 29 (60); Shane Snater 5/13 (7.4 overs)		232 (65.5 overs); Shane Snater 69 (72); Craig Miles 4/58 (9.5 overs)
114 (34.1 overs); Danny Briggs 51 (48); Jamie Porter 6/36 (12.1 overs)

Essex won by an innings and 40 runs
Edgbaston, Birmingham
Umpires: Graham Lloyd and Neil Pratt

- Essex won the toss and elected to field
- Points: Warwickshire 3, Essex 19

26–29 September 2024 (Round 14)
Scorecard

Durham	v	Kent
360 (77.1 overs); Alex Lees 144 (180); Matt Parkinson 6/109 (24.1 overs)		353/8d (100 overs); Jack Leaning 84 (168); Bas de Leede 3/64 (18 overs)

Match drawn
Riverside Ground, Chester-le-Street
Umpires: Russell Warren and Rob White

- Kent won the toss and elected to field.
- No play was possible on day 1 and day 2 due to rain and wet outfield.
- Points: Durham 13, Kent 14

26–29 September 2024 (Round 14)
Scorecard

Essex	v	Surrey
508/8d (117.3 overs); Dean Elgar 182 (284); Ryan Patel 3/41 (12 overs)		267/7 (84 overs); Dom Sibley 125 (189); Simon Harmer 3/88 (34 overs)

Match drawn
County Ground, Chelmsford
Umpires: Ian Blackwell and Rob Bailey

- Essex won the toss and elected to bat.
- Only 28.3 overs were possible on Day 1, and no play was possible on Day 2 due to rain and wet outfield.
- Josh Blake, Yousef Majid, and Ollie Sykes (Surrey) all made their first-class debuts.
- Points: Essex 15, Surrey 10

26–29 September 2024 (Round 14)
Scorecard

Nottinghamshire	v	Warwickshire
487 (125.3 overs); Kyle Verreynne 148* (167); Rob Yates 2/28 (8 overs)		373/7 (110 overs); Sam Hain 153* (309); Farhan Ahmed 3/102 (35 overs)

Match drawn
Trent Bridge, Nottingham
Umpires: David Millns and Jack Chantry

- Warwickshire won the toss and elected to field.
- Rain and bad light restricted play to 15.2 overs on Day 1, and 67.2 overs on Day 2. Only 86.5 overs were possible on day 3 due to bad light.
- Points: Nottinghamshire 14, Warwickshire 13

26–29 September 2024 (Round 14)
Scorecard

Somerset	v	Hampshire
136 (53.5 overs); Tom Kohler-Cadmore 63 (135); Liam Dawson 4/28 (18 overs)		196 (60.4 overs); Toby Albert 77 (162); Jack Leach 5/52 (20 overs)
180 (53.3 overs); Lewis Gregory 59 (47); Kyle Abbott 5/37 (18 overs)		121/5 (27 overs); James Vince 54 (68); Lewis Gregory 3/30 (6 overs)

Hampshire won by 5 wickets
County Ground, Taunton
Umpires: James Middlebrook and Peter Hartley

- Somerset won the toss and elected to bat.
- Only 71.5 overs were bowled on Day 1 and 54.4 overs on Day 2 due to rain.
- Points: Hampshire 19, Somerset 3

26–29 September 2024 (Round 14)
Scorecard

Worcestershire	v	Lancashire
180 (45 overs); Matthew Waite 60 (58); Anderson Phillip 5/65 (13 overs)		177 (55.1 overs); Luke Wells 38 (42); Matthew Waite 3/38 (14 overs)
223/9 (56 overs); Logan van Beek 44 (61); Anderson Phillip 4/77 (18 overs)

Match drawn
New Road, Worcester
Umpires: Alex Wharf and Graham Lloyd

- Lancashire won the toss and elected to field.
- Only 26 overs of play was possible on Day 1 and no play was possible on Day 2 due to rain and wet outfield.
- After 13 seasons, Joe Leach played in his final game for Worcestershire prior to retirement.
- Points: Worcestershire 11, Lancashire 11

== Division Two results ==
=== April ===
5–8 April 2024 (Round 1)
Scorecard

Derbyshire	v	Gloucestershire

Match abandoned
County Ground, Derby

- No toss.
- No play was possible on all 4 days due to rain and wet outfield.
- Points: Derbyshire 8, Gloucestershire 8.

5–8 April 2024 (Round 1)
Scorecard

Glamorgan	v	Middlesex
620/3d (139 overs); Sam Northeast 335* (412); Ethan Bamber 2/90 (25 overs)		655 (211.2 overs); Ryan Higgins 221 (360); Kiran Carlson 3/147 (47 overs)
31/2 (16 overs); Sam Northeast 14* (42); Ethan Bamber 1/8 (4 overs)

Match drawn
Lord's, London
Umpires: Hassan Adnan and James Middlebrook

- Middlesex won the toss and elected to field.
- Sam Northeast (Glamorgan) made the highest first-class score at Lord's.
- Points: Middlesex 11, Glamorgan 13.

5–8 April 2024 (Round 1)
Scorecard

Northamptonshire	v	Sussex
371 (117 overs); Luke Procter 92 (225); Jayden Seales 4/86 (26 overs)		478/9d (99.4 overs); Tom Haines 133 (183); Saif Zaib 4/84 (15.4 overs)
170/9 (55 overs); Rob Keogh 55 (67); James Coles 3/36 (14 overs)

Match drawn
County Ground, Hove
Umpires: Paul Baldwin and Surendiran Shanmugam

- Sussex won the toss and elected to field.
- Points: Sussex 15, Northamptonshire 13.

5–8 April 2024 (Round 1)
Scorecard

Leicestershire	v	Yorkshire
354 (93.3 overs); Ben Mike 90 (113); Matt Milnes 4/73 (17.3 overs)		264/6d (42.4 overs); Adam Lyth 101 (100); Ben Mike 4/44 (8.4 overs)
26/0 (7.2 overs); Rishi Patel 16* (19); Adam Lyth 0/12 (3.2 overs)

Match drawn
Headingley, Leeds
Umpires: Mark Newell and Jack Shantry

- Yorkshire won the toss and elected to field.
- No play was possible on day 3 due to rain.
- Points: Yorkshire 12, Leicestershire 13.

12–15 April 2024 (Round 2)
Scorecard

Glamorgan	v	Derbyshire
237 (78 overs); Kiran Carlson 74 (99); Alex Thomson 7/65 (26 overs)		198 (79.5 overs); Wayne Madsen 63 (113); Mason Crane 4/60 (25.5 overs)
361/7d (104.3 overs); Chris Cooke 126* (195); Alex Thomson 5/136 (44 overs)		225/3 (75 overs); Luis Reece 91* (209); James Harris 2/24 (11 overs)

Match drawn
Sophia Gardens, Cardiff
Umpires: Rob Bailey and Neil Bainton

- Derbyshire won the toss and elected to field.
- Alex Thomson (Derbyshire) took his maiden ten-wicket haul in first-class cricket.
- Points: Glamorgan 11, Derbyshire 11

12–15 April 2024 (Round 2)
Scorecard

Yorkshire	v	Gloucestershire
326 (79.3 overs); Shan Masood 140 (184); Zaman Akhter 5/89 (18.3 overs)		263 (92 overs); Cameron Bancroft 70 (196); Ben Coad 3/44 (21 overs)
434/6d (82 overs); Adam Lyth 113 (150); Graeme van Buuren 2/83 (15 overs)		405/6 (116 overs); Oliver Price 147 (220); Ben Coad 3/43 (16 overs)

Match drawn
County Ground, Bristol
Umpires: Hassan Adnan and Peter Hartley

- Gloucestershire won the toss and elected to field.
- Zaman Akhter (Gloucestershire) took his maiden five-wicket haul in first-class cricket.
- Points: Gloucestershire 12, Yorkshire 13.

12–15 April 2024 (Round 2)
Scorecard

Leicestershire	v	Sussex
338 (98.4 overs); Rishi Patel 87 (98); Fynn Hudson-Prentice 5/50 (22.4 overs)		694/9d (160.5 overs); John Simpson 205* (295); Matt Salisbury 3/77 (28 overs)
86/1 (24 overs); Rishi Patel 37* (71); Jack Carson 1/15 (5 overs)

Match drawn
Grace Road, Leicester
Umpires: James Middlebrook and Paul Pollard

- Sussex won the toss and elected to field.
- No play was possible on day 4 due to rain.
- John Simpson (Sussex) scored his maiden double century in first-class cricket.
- Points: Leicestershire 12, Sussex 14

12–15 April 2024 (Round 2)
Scorecard

Northamptonshire	v	Middlesex
552/6d (152 overs); Emilio Gay 261 (401); Toby Roland-Jones 2/81 (22 overs)		553/2 (138 overs); Max Holden 211* (377); Luke Procter 1/44 (14 overs)

Match drawn
County Ground, Northampton
Umpires: Tom Lungley and Rob White

- Middlesex won the toss and elected to field.
- No play was possible on day 4 due to rain.
- Nathan Fernandes (Middlesex) and Raphael Weatherall (Northamptonshire) made their first-class debuts.
- Emilio Gay (Northamptonshire) and Max Holden (Middlesex) scored their maiden double centuries in first-class cricket.
- James Sales (Northamptonshire) and Nathan Fernandes (Middlesex) scored their maiden centuries in first-class cricket.
- Points: Northamptonshire 11, Middlesex 12

19–22 April 2024 (Round 3)
Scorecard

Leicestershire	v	Derbyshire
574/7d (130 overs); Marcus Harris 214 (303); Blair Tickner 2/83 (25 overs)		167 (46 overs); David Lloyd 54 (76); Tom Scriven 3/30 (14 overs)
		224/6 (74 overs) (f/o); Wayne Madsen 59* (114); Scott Currie 3/36 (14 overs)

Match drawn
County Ground, Derby
Umpires: Peter Hartley and Surendiram Shanmugam

- Derbyshire won the toss and elected to field.
- Only 46 overs were possible on day 1 and there was no play on day 4 due to rain.
- Points: Derbyshire 9, Leicestershire 16

19–22 April 2024 (Round 3)
Scorecard

Yorkshire	v	Middlesex
159 (37.4 overs); Shan Masood 33 (51); Ryan Higgins 4/31 (6 overs)		246 (56.2 overs); Leus du Plooy 51 (47); Jordan Thompson 5/80 (17.2 overs)
244 (71.3 overs); George Hill 75 (151); Ryan Higgins 3/41 (14 overs)		158/4 (57.4 overs); Leus du Plooy 42 (78); Ben Coad 2/20 (14 overs)

Middlesex won by 6 wickets
Lord's, London
Umpires: Richard Illingworth and Jack Shantry

- Middlesex won the toss and elected to field.
- Only 55.4 overs were possible on day 1 due to rain.
- Points: Middlesex 19, Yorkshire 3

19–22 April 2024 (Round 3)
Scorecard

Glamorgan	v	Northamptonshire
271 (74.2 overs); Colin Ingram 82 (125); Ben Sanderson 5/92 (26 overs)		605/6d (145.4 overs); Karun Nair 202* (253); James Harris 2/109 (26 overs)
104/3 (40 overs); Billy Root 41 (61); Saif Zaib 1/22 (11 overs)

Match drawn
County Ground, Northampton
Umpires: Graham Lloyd and Sue Redfern

- Northamptonshire won the toss and elected to field.
- Only 56.1 overs were possible on day 1 and there was no play on day 4 due to rain.
- Points: Northamptonshire 15, Glamorgan 10

19–22 April 2024 (Round 3)
Scorecard

Gloucestershire	v	Sussex
417 (108.5 overs); James Bracey 69 (97); Danny Lamb 3/69 (20 overs)		479 (135.5 overs); Cheteshwar Pujara 86 (148); Dominic Goodman 3/79 (25.5 overs)
205 (85.2 overs); Miles Hammond 77 (204); Jayden Seales 4/18 (16.2 overs)		144/6 (37.4 overs); Cheteshwar Pujara 44* (102 overs); Zafar Gohar 5/59 (18.4 overs)

Sussex won by 4 wickets
County Ground, Hove
Umpires: Neil Bainton and Mark Newell

- Sussex won the toss and elected to field.
- Points: Sussex 22, Gloucestershire 6

26–29 April 2024 (Round 4)
Scorecard

Middlesex	v	Gloucestershire
203 (59.5 overs); Josh de Caires 37 (77); Marchant de Lange 6/49 (16 overs)		322 (98 overs); Miles Hammond 81 (111); Henry Brookes 3/55 (13 overs)
449/7d (96 overs); Ryan Higgins 155 (174); Dominic Goodman 3/94 (21 overs)		127/3 (39.3 overs); Oliver Price 52* (128); Tom Helm 2/25 (9 overs)

Match drawn
County Ground, Bristol
Umpires: Neil Pratt and Surendiran Shanmugam

- Gloucestershire won the toss and elected to field.
- Only 50.4 overs were possible on day 2 due to rain.
- Points: Gloucestershire 13, Middlesex 11

26–29 April 2024 (Round 4)
Scorecard

Northamptonshire	v	Leicestershire
453/7d (110 overs); George Bartlett 126* (194); Rehan Ahmed 2/64 (20 overs)		452/8d (108.1 overs); Peter Handscomb 99 (117); Ben Sanderson 4/92 (31 overs)

Match drawn
Grace Road, Leicester
Umpires: Ben Debenham and Jack Shantry

- Leicestershire won the toss and elected to field.
- Only 27.1 overs were possible on day 2 due to rain, and there was no play on day 3 due to a wet outfield.
- Points: Leicestershire 15, Northamptonshire 15

26–29 April 2024 (Round 4)
Scorecard

Yorkshire	v	Derbyshire
450/5d (97.2 overs); Harry Brook 126* (135); Zak Chappell 2/73 (16 overs)		447 (114 overs); Wayne Madsen 104 (226); Matthew Fisher 4/96 (27 overs)
59/1d (21 overs); Finlay Bean 33 (64); David Lloyd 1/0 (1 over)

Match drawn
Headingley Cricket Ground, Leeds
Umpires: Hassan Adnan and Martin Saggers

- Derbyshire won the toss and elected to field.
- Only 59 overs were possible on day 1 due to rain and bad light, and there was no play on day 3 due to rain.
- Points: Yorkshire 16, Derbyshire 13

=== May ===
3–5 May 2024 (Round 4/5 (Note: Derbyshire had played one more game than Sussex prior to this match.))
Scorecard

Derbyshire	v	Sussex
246 (63.3 overs); Luis Reece 50 (78); James Coles 2/6 (4.3 overs)		479 (109.4 overs); Cheteshwar Pujara 113 (186); Daryn Dupavillon 3/89 (20 overs)
109 (26 overs); David Lloyd 26 (32); Jayden Seales 5/29 (8 overs)

Sussex won by an innings and 124 runs
County Ground, Derby
Umpires: Nigel Llong and Tom Lungley

- Sussex won the toss and elected to field.
- Only 44.5 overs were possible on day 1 due to rain.
- Jayden Seales (Sussex) posted career-best figures in Derbyshire's second innings.
- Sussex and Derbyshire were each deducted one point due to a slow over rate.
- Points: Derbyshire 2, Sussex 23

3–6 May 2024 (Round 4/5 (Note: Yorkshire had played one more game than Glamorgan prior to this match.))
Scorecard

Glamorgan	v	Yorkshire
221 (79 overs); Billy Root 51 (95); Dom Bess 4/25 (13 overs)		519/7d (94.1 overs); Finlay Bean 173 (189); Mason Crane 5/152 (23.1 overs)
372/7 (138 overs); Sam Northeast 142* (336); Adam Lyth 2/21 (6 overs)

Match drawn
Headingley Cricket Ground, Leeds
Umpires: Ian Blackwell and Mark Newell

- Glamorgan won the toss and elected to bat.
- Only 41 overs were possible on day 1 due to rain.
- Points: Yorkshire 16, Glamorgan 10

3–6 May 2024 (Round 5)
Scorecard

Leicestershire	v	Middlesex
306 (83.2 overs); Peter Handscomb 109 (188); Ethan Bamber 4/68 (23.2 overs)		407/8 (103 overs); Sam Robson 162 (273); Scott Currie 2/66 (20 overs)

Match drawn
Lord's, London
Umpires: Paul Baldwin and Rob White

- Middlesex won the toss and elected to field.
- No play was possible on day 1 and 4 due to rain.
- Points: Middlesex 15, Leicestershire 12

10–13 May 2024 (Round 5)
Scorecard

Sussex	v	Glamorgan
278 (87.2 overs); Fynn Hudson-Prentice 48 (64); Mir Hamza 4/70 (23 overs)		411 (102.2 overs); Colin Ingram 170 (248); Jayden Seales 5/101 (23.2 overs)
188 (49.3 overs); Fynn Hudson-Prentice 70 (74); Andy Gorvin 4/50 (13 overs)		58/1 (7.5 overs); Billy Root 36* (28); Aristides Karvelas 1/33 (3.5 overs)

Glamorgan won by 9 wickets
Sophia Gardens, Cardiff
Umpires: Surendiran Shanmugam and Chris Watts

- Glamorgan won the toss and elected to field.
- Colin Ingram and Kiran Carlson's first-innings partnership of 315 (off 75.5 overs) was a Glamorgan record for the fifth wicket.
- Points: Sussex 4, Glamorgan 23

10–13 May 2024 (Round 5)
Scorecard

Gloucestershire	v	Northamptonshire
409 (107.2 overs); Miles Hammond 112 (133); Siddarth Kaul 5/76 (29 overs)		171 (58.4 overs); Ricardo Vasconcelos 43 (45); Marchant de Lange 5/52 (16 overs)
319/5d (71.4 overs); Cameron Bancroft 130* (205); Liam Patterson-White 3/110 (29 overs)		301 (94.2 overs); Emilio Gay 74 (118); Marchant de Lange 3/58 (20 overs)

Gloucestershire won by 256 runs.
County Ground, Northampton
Umpires: Neil Bainton and Martin Saggers

- Northamptonshire won the toss and elected to field.
- Siddarth Kaul made his debut for Northamptonshire.
- Points: Northamptonshire 3, Gloucestershire 23

17–20 May 2024 (Round 6)
Scorecard

Northamptonshire	v	Derbyshire
422 (133.3 overs); Rob Keogh 102 (220); David Lloyd 2/53 (18 overs)		362 (111.2 overs); Brooke Guest 76 (173); Ben Sanderson 5/76 (27 overs)
310/3d (53 overs); Emilio Gay 153* (166); Zak Chappell 1/50 (6 overs)		261/9 (83 overs); Zak Chappell 72 (101); Rob Keogh 5/62 (22 overs)

Match drawn
County Ground, Derby
Umpires: Mark Newell and Neil Pratt

- Northamptonshire won the toss and elected to bat.
- Points: Derbyshire 12, Northamptonshire 13

17–20 May 2024 (Round 6)
Scorecard

Glamorgan	v	Middlesex
183 (72.5 overs); Zain-ul-Hassan 34 (78); Tom Helm 4/44 (17 overs)		343 (117 overs); Mark Stoneman 129 (244); James Harris 4/84 (28 overs)
372 (112.2 overs); Marnus Labuschagne 111 (200); Luke Hollman 3/57 (14.2 overs)		213/8 (64 overs); Mark Stoneman 63 (117); Mason Crane 5/99 (27 overs)

Middlesex won by 2 wickets
Sophia Gardens, Cardiff
Umpires: Paul Baldwin and Jack Shantry

- Middlesex won the toss and elected to field.
- Points: Glamorgan 2, Middlesex 21

17–20 May 2024 (Round 6)
Scorecard

Gloucestershire	v	Leicestershire
706/6d (148.4 overs); Cameron Bancroft 160 (267); Scott Currie 2/84 (29 overs)		371 (122.3 overs); Rishi Patel 117 (252); Matt Taylor 3/62 (22 overs)
		377/7 (105 overs) (f/o); Peter Handscomb 81 (135); Josh Shaw 2/56 (19 overs)

Match drawn
Grace Road, Leicester
Umpires: Surendiran Shanmugam and Chris Watts

- Leicestershire won the toss and elected to field.
- Gloucestershire's first innings total was their highest ever in first-class cricket.
- The 316-run partnership between Cameron Bancroft and Ben Charlesworth, who scored his maiden century as a professional, was a record for the first wicket against Leicestershire by any side in first-class cricket.
- Points: Leicestershire 11, Gloucestershire 14

17–20 May 2024 (Round 6)
Scorecard

Sussex	v	Yorkshire
150 (44.1 overs); James Coles 38 (86); George Hill 4/22 (10 overs)		195 (56.3 overs); Joe Root 67 (88); Sean Hunt 4/64 (14 overs)
227 (87.5 overs); Tom Alsop 86 (256); George Hill 3/44 (22.5 overs)		161 (57 overs); Adam Lyth 73 (152); Ollie Robinson 4/42 (17 overs)

Sussex won by 21 runs
County Ground, Hove
Umpires: Hassan Adnan and David Millns

- Yorkshire won the toss and elected to field.
- Sussex were deducted 1 point for a slow over rate.
- Points: Sussex 18, Yorkshire 3

24–27 May 2024 (Round 7)
Scorecard

Derbyshire	v	Gloucestershire
526 (125.4 overs); Matthew Lamb 207 (278); Beau Webster 6/100 (26 overs)		530 (117.1 overs); Graeme van Buuren 187 (236); Zak Chappell 5/58 (19 overs)
166/4d (45.5 overs); Brooke Guest 57 (129); Ed Middleton 2/40 (14 overs)

Match drawn
County Ground, Bristol
Umpires: Naeem Ashraf and Paul Pollard

- Derbyshire won the toss and elected to bat.
- Only 21 overs were possible on day 3 due to rain.
- Matthew Lamb (Derbyshire) scored his maiden double-century in first-class cricket.
- Beau Webster (Gloucestershire) took his maiden five-wicket haul in first-class cricket.
- Points: Gloucestershire 14, Derbyshire 15

24–27 May 2024 (Round 7)
Scorecard

Glamorgan	v	Leicestershire
387 (104.5 overs); Eddie Byrom 86 (135); Scott Currie 5/64 (26 overs)		343/9d (119 overs); Peter Handscomb 103 (178); Timm van der Gugten 5/65 (26 overs)
157/4 (59.3 overs); Sam Northeast 41* (86); Ben Mike 2/29 (11 overs)

Match drawn
Grace Road, Leicester
Umpires: Hassan Adnan and Neil Bainton

- Leicestershire won the toss and elected to field.
- Only 43 overs were possible on day 3 due to rain.
- Scott Currie (Leicestershire) took his maiden five-wicket haul in first-class cricket.
- Ian Holland (on loan from Hampshire) made his Leicestershire debut.
- Points: Leicestershire 13, Glamorgan 13

24–27 May 2024 (Round 7)
Scorecard

Sussex	v	Middlesex
554/9d (164.3 overs); John Simpson 167 (336); Ethan Bamber 3/114 (36 overs)		613/9d (196 overs); Sam Robson 136 (236); Jack Carson 4/166 (56 overs)

Match drawn
Lord's, London
Umpires: Neil Pratt and Chris Watts

- Middlesex won the toss and elected to field.
- Points: Middlesex 12, Sussex 13

24–27 May 2024 (Round 7)
Scorecard

Yorkshire	v	Northamptonshire
362 (104.1 overs); Adam Lyth 109 (205); Luke Procter 3/63 (21 overs)		301 (82 overs); Luke Procter 116* (201); Vishwa Fernando 4/48 (19 overs)
264/6d (59 overs); Shan Masood 131* (152); Ben Sanderson 3/51 (21 overs)		250/8 (56.5 overs); Ricardo Vasconcelos 129* (183); Adam Lyth 4/56 (14 overs)

Match drawn
County Ground, Northampton
Umpires: Paul Baldwin and Anthony Harris

- Northamptonshire won the toss and elected to field.
- Only 38.2 overs were possible on day 3 due to rain.
- Points: Northamptonshire 13, Yorkshire 14

=== June ===
23–26 June 2024 (Round 8)
Scorecard

Northamptonshire	v	Glamorgan
279 (86.3 overs); Emilio Gay 65 (93); Timm van der Gugten 3/39 (22.3 overs)		490 (131.5 overs); Marnus Labuschagne 93 (124); Luke Procter 3/51 (20 overs)
472/8d (120 overs); Lewis McManus 168 (200); Mason Crane 3/178 (41 overs)		207/7 (38.5 overs); Marnus Labuschagne 64 (61); Liam Patterson-White 3/101 (18.5 overs)

Match drawn
Sophia Gardens, Cardiff
Umpires: Hassan Adnan and Sue Redfern

- Northamptonshire won the toss and elected to bat.
- Gus Miller (Northamptonshire) made his first-class debut.
- Points: Northamptonshire 3, Glamorgan 7

23–26 June 2024 (Round 8)
Scorecard

Middlesex	v	Derbyshire
433 (115.3 overs); Ryan Higgins 163 (226); Zak Chappell 3/69 (23 overs)		339 (87.2 overs); Luis Reece 125 (257); Toby Roland-Jones 5/81 (19.2 overs)
302 (79.4 overs); Sam Robson 67 (59); Alex Thomson 4/115 (33.4 overs)		202 (78 overs); Zak Chappell 50 (90); Henry Brookes 3/29 (13 overs)

Middlesex won by 194 runs
Lord's, London
Umpires: Naeem Ashraf and Chris Watts

- Middlesex won the toss and elected to bat.
- Points: Middlesex 23, Derbyshire 5

23–26 June 2024 (Round 8)
Scorecard

Sussex	v	Leicestershire
442 (102 overs); John Simpson 183* (258); Ian Holland 4/64 (21 overs)		275 (70.3 overs); Peter Handscomb 92 (176); Sean Hunt 4/70 (11.3 overs)
296/6d (69 overs); Tom Alsop 81* (122); Scott Currie 2/28 (10 overs)		445 (80.4 overs); Louis Kimber 243 (127); James Coles 3/95 (15 overs)

Sussex won by 18 runs
County Ground, Hove
Umpires: Neil Pratt and Paul Baldwin

- Leicestershire won the toss and elected to field.
- Ollie Robinson bowled the most expensive over in County Championship history where declaration bowling was not involved, conceding 43 runs (6, 6nb, 4, 6, 4, 6nb, 4, 6nb, 1) in Leicestershire's second innings.
- Louis Kimber (Leicestershire) reached his double century from only 100 balls, making it the fastest ever in the Championship, and the second fastest recorded in first-class cricket worldwide. During the course of his innings, he also hit the most sixes (21) and scored the most runs in an over (the 43 off Robinson). His total of 243 was the highest in first-class cricket by a player batting at number eight, and was described in Wisden Cricket Monthly as "one of the most extraordinary innings in Championship history".
- Points: Sussex 23, Leicestershire 4

23–26 June 2024 (Round 8)
Scorecard

Yorkshire	v	Gloucestershire
456 (120.1 overs); Finlay Bean 164 (250); Ajeet Singh Dale 3/70 (24 overs)		197 (82.3 overs); Oliver Price 47 (105); Matthew Revis 3/30 (13 overs)
		237 (68.4 overs) (f/o); Zaman Akhter 70 (83); George Hill 3/43 (15 overs)

Yorkshire won by an innings and 22 runs
North Marine Road, Scarborough
Umpires: Neil Bainton and Anthony Harris

- Gloucestershire won the toss and elected to field.
- Points: Yorkshire 22, Gloucestershire 2

30 June–3 July 2024 (Round 9)
Scorecard

Derbyshire	v	Yorkshire
76 (27.4 overs); Zak Chappell 18 (18); Vishwa Fernando 5/30 (10 overs)		451/9d (101.1 overs); James Wharton 188 (241); Luis Reece 4/74 (24 overs)
171 (42.5 overs); David Lloyd 57 (84); Ben Coad 6/30 (15 overs)

Yorkshire won by an innings and 204 runs
Queen's Park, Chesterfield
Umpires: Neil Pratt and Sue Redfern

- Derbyshire won the toss and elected to bat.
- Rain limited play to 58 overs on day 1, and 35.1 overs on day 2.
- James Wharton hit his maiden first-class century. His partnership with Jonny Tattersall of 241 runs (from 323 balls) broke the Yorkshire record for the sixth wicket against Derbyshire, which had stood since 1921.
- Points: Derbyshire 3, Yorkshire 24

30 June–3 July 2024 (Round 9)
Scorecard

Gloucestershire	v	Glamorgan
179 (44.4 overs); Marchant de Lange 46* (37); Timm van der Gugten 5/49 (15 overs)		197 (61.1 overs); Mason Crane 44 (56); Beau Webster 5/17 (10.1 overs)
610/5d (116 overs); James Bracey 204* (231); Timm van der Gugten 2/98 (22 overs)		592 (152 overs); Sam Northeast 187 (277); Matt Taylor 3/120 (31 overs)

Match tied
College Ground, Cheltenham
Umpires: Naeem Ashraf and Paul Baldwin

- Glamorgan won the toss and elected to field.
- Marchant de Lange and Ajeet Singh Dale shared the highest tenth-wicket partnership for Gloucestershire against Glamorgan, hitting 75 runs (off 73 balls) in the home side's first innings.
- James Bracey (Gloucestershire) become only the tenth player to hit a double century at the College Ground.
- When Jamie McIlroy was dismissed by Ajeet Singh Dale with the final ball of the match, Glamorgan were just one run short of setting a new world record for highest successful run chase in first-class cricket.
- Points: Gloucestershire 11, Glamorgan 11

30 June–3 July 2024 (Round 9)
Scorecard

Leicestershire	v	Middlesex
179 (49.3 overs); Lewis Goldsworthy 41 (68); Ryan Higgins 4/35 (16 overs)		86 (32.3 overs); Leus du Plooy 28 (53); Ben Mike 5/22 (11 overs)
372 (79.5 overs); Ben Green 77 (86); Toby Roland-Jones 5/76 (22 overs)		342 (88.3 overs); Leus du Plooy 60 (133); Ben Mike 3/88 (20 overs)

Leicestershire won by 123 runs
Grace Road, Leicester
Umpires: Ian Blackwell and Ben Peverall

- Leicestershire won the toss and elected to bat.
- Lewis Goldsworthy and Ben Green (Leicestershire) were both on loan from Somerset.
- Ben Mike posted career-best bowling figures in Middlesex's first innings, as also did Green (4/28 off 9 overs).
- Points: Leicestershire 19, Middlesex 3

30 June–3 July 2024 (Round 9)
Scorecard

Northamptonshire	v	Sussex
97 (20.1 overs); Ricardo Vasconcelos 33 (23); Ollie Robinson 4/42 (9 overs)		143 (47.2 overs); Daniel Hughes 35 (60); Jack White 4/23 (12 overs)
220 (69.2 overs); Emilio Gay 67 (111); Nathan McAndrew 5/73 (21.2 overs)		237 (73.1 overs); Tom Haines 45 (48); Luke Procter 4/45 (15.1 overs)

Sussex won by 53 runs
County Ground, Northampton
Umpires: Hassan Adnan and Anthony Harris

- Northamptonshire won the toss and elected to field.
- Matthew Breetzke (Northamptonshire) made his Championship debut.
- Sussex were deducted one point for a slow over rate.
- Points: Northamptonshire 3, Sussex 18

=== August ===
22–25 August 2024 (Round 10)
Scorecard

Glamorgan	v	Derbyshire
168 (47.3 overs); Timm van der Gugten 46* (99); Zak Chappell 6/47 (16 overs)		429 (117.1 overs); Anuj Dal 94 (135); Mason Crane 3/43 (17.1 overs)
287 (99 overs); Kiran Carlson 56 (139); Jack Morley 3/46 (27 overs)		27/0 (6.4 overs); Harry Came 16* (22)

Derbyshire won by 10 wickets
County Ground, Derby
Umpires: Ben Debenham and Ben Peverall

- Derbyshire won the toss and elected to field.
- Points: Derbyshire 23, Glamorgan 3

22–25 August 2024 (Round 10)
Scorecard

Leicestershire	v	Gloucestershire
402 (103.1 overs); Ian Holland 104 (173); Zaman Akhter 3/110 (20 overs)		544/4d (123 overs); Ben Charlesworth 210 (311); Ben Green 2/99 (22 overs)
304/5 (79 overs); Rishi Patel 75 (102); Marchant de Lange 2/31 (13 overs)

Match drawn
County Ground, Bristol
Umpires: Surendiran Shanmugam and Jack Shantry

- Gloucestershire won the toss and elected to field.
- Points: Gloucestershire 16, Leicestershire 13

22–25 August 2024 (Round 10)
Scorecard

Northamptonshire	v	Middlesex
207 (56.5 overs); Emilio Gay 42 (77); Toby Roland-Jones 5/49 (18.5 overs)		264 (91.1 overs); Leus du Plooy 71 (110); Ben Sanderson 6/64 (24 overs)
167 (60.1 overs); Luke Procter 33 (72); Toby Roland-Jones 6/58 (23.1 overs)		114/2 (16.4 overs); Sam Robson 64* (42); Ben Sanderson 2/34 (7 overs)

Middlesex won by 8 wickets
Merchant Taylors' School Ground, Northwood
Umpires: Hassan Adnan and Neil Pratt

- Middlesex won the toss and elected to field.
- No play was possible on day 3 due to rain.
- Indian leg-spinner Yuzvendra Chahal made his first-class debut for Northamptonshire, with whom he had signed for the remainder of the season.
- Points: Middlesex 20, Northamptonshire 3

22–25 August 2024 (Round 10)
Scorecard

Sussex	v	Yorkshire
189 (73.5 overs); Tom Alsop 86* (187); Matt Revis 3/38 (16 overs)		326 (82.5 overs); Will Luxton 59 (130); Jack Carson 5/83 (20 overs)
239 (90.2 overs); John Simpson 67 (151); Ben Coad 5/69 (23.2 overs)		103/6 (27.5 overs); Adam Lyth 40 (60); Jack Carson 4/37 (7.5 overs)

Yorkshire won by 4 wickets
North Marine Road, Scarborough
Umpires: Tom Lungley and James Middlebrook

- Yorkshire won the toss and elected to field.
- Points: Yorkshire 21, Sussex 3

29 August–1 September 2024 (Round 11)
Scorecard

Leicestershire	v	Glamorgan
251 (68.5 overs); Peter Handscomb 46 (63); Timm van der Gugten 4/45 (19 overs)		550/9d (147 overs); Colin Ingram 257* (375); Ian Holland 4/96 (29 overs)
369/6 (117.2 overs); Peter Handscomb 139* (253); Kiran Carlson 2/17 (12 overs)

Match drawn
Sophia Gardens, Cardiff
Umpires: Hassan Adnan and Neil Pratt

- Glamorgan won the toss and elected to field.
- Sam Wood (Leicestershire) and Asa Tribe (Glamorgan) both made their first-class debuts.
- Points: Leicestershire 11, Glamorgan 14

29 August–1 September 2024 (Round 11)
Scorecard

Gloucestershire	v	Northamptonshire
125 (36.1 overs); Oliver Price 52 (85); Justin Broad 7/33 (15.1 overs)		116/2 (29.3 overs); Prithvi Shaw 34 (37); Dominic Goodman 1/30 (9 overs)

Match drawn
County Ground, Bristol
Umpires: Sue Redfern and Chris Watts

- Northamptonshire won the toss and elected to field.
- The game was abandoned late on day 1 due to an unsafe pitch.
- Justin Broad's bowling figures were the best of the season in division two.
- Points: Gloucestershire 0, Northamptonshire 11.

29 August–1 September 2024 (Round 11)
Scorecard

Sussex	v	Derbyshire
607/8d (140.2 overs); Daniel Hughes 144 (142); Daryn Dupavillon 3/107 (20.2 overs)		290 (83.3 overs); Wayne Madsen 138 (210); Jack Carson 5/90 (24 overs)
		258 (109.5 overs) (f/o); Harry Came 79 (273); Jack Carson 6/67 (37 overs)

Sussex won by an innings and 59 runs
County Ground, Hove
Umpires: Paul Baldwin and Ian Blackwell

- Derbyshire won the toss and elected to field.
- Sussex recorded their highest score against Derbyshire.
- Setting two career records, Jack Carson (Sussex) hit 97 from 129 balls and returned match bowling figures of 11/157.
- Points: Sussex 24, Derbyshire 3

29 August–1 September 2024 (Round 11)
Scorecard

Yorkshire	v	Middlesex
601/6d (144 overs); George Hill 169* (257); Luke Hollman 4/194 (47 overs)		522 (174.4 overs); Ryan Higgins 155 (259); Dom Bess 7/179 (70.4 overs)
150/2 (35 overs); Adam Lyth 62 (99); Tom Helm 1/19 (9 overs)

Match drawn
Headingley Cricket Ground, Leeds
Umpires: Mark Newell and Rob White

- Yorkshire won the toss and elected to bat.
- Noah Cornwell (Middlesex) made his first-class debut.
- Jonny Bairstow and George Hill shared a record partnership of 238 (from 58.4 overs) for Yorkshire's sixth wicket against Middlesex.
- George Hill (Yorkshire) hit a career-best score.
- Points: Yorkshire 13, Middlesex 11

=== September ===
9–12 September 2024 (Round 12)
Scorecard

Leicestershire	v	Yorkshire
98 (24.2 overs); Ben Cox 51* (31); Ben Coad 5/15 (10 overs)		379 (98 overs); Jonny Tattersall 126 (215); Tom Scriven 4/103 (23 overs)
209 (53.3 overs); Rehan Ahmed 77 (86); George Hill 6/59 (13.3 overs)

Yorkshire won by an innings and 72 runs
Grace Road, Leicester
Umpires: Jack Shantry and Chris Watts

- Yorkshire won the toss and elected to field.
- Rain restricted play to 37.1 overs on day 2.
- Leicestershire were without Peter Handscomb, who had returned home for the Australian domestic season.
- Matthew Fisher (Yorkshire) posted a career-best score of 88 (from 124 deliveries).
- Points: Yorkshire 22, Leicestershire 3

9–12 September 2024 (Round 12)
Scorecard

Middlesex	v	Gloucestershire
377 (93.2 overs); Jack Davies 91 (137); Tom Price 5/81 (21.2 overs)		309/9d (87.1 overs); Zafar Gohar 86 (158); Toby Roland-Jones 5/79 (24 overs)
165 (29.2 overs); Sam Robson 50 (54); Archie Bailey 4/30 (6 overs)		236/6 (65.5 overs); Miles Hammond 78 (126); Josh de Caires 3/45 (12.5 overs)

Gloucestershire won by 4 wickets
Lord's, London
Umpires: Paul Baldwin and Anthony Harris

- Gloucestershire won the toss and elected to field.
- Rain and bad light limited play to 41.4 overs on day 2. Only 74.5 overs were possible on day 3 due to rain.
- Archie Bailey (Gloucestershire) made his first-class debut, and took his maiden first-class wicket in Middlesex's second innings.
- In Middlesex's first innings, Jack Davies posted a career-best first-class score.
- Gloucestershire were deducted 2 points for a slow over rate.
- Points: Gloucestershire 19, Middlesex 6

9–12 September 2024 (Round 12)
Scorecard

Northamptonshire	v	Derbyshire
219 (66.5 overs); Saif Zaib 90 (144); Martin Andersson 2/28 (10 overs)		165 (61.3 overs); Luis Reece 50 (123); Yuzvendra Chahal 5/45 (16.3 overs)
211 (62.2 overs); Rob Keogh 63 (99); Martin Andersson 3/23 (7.2 overs)		132 (46 overs); Wayne Madsen 48* (94); Rob Keogh 5/44 (15 overs)

Northamptonshire won by 133 runs
County Ground, Northampton
Umpires: Rob Bailey and James Tredwell

- Northamptonshire won the toss and elected to bat.
- Rain restricted play to 78.5 overs on day 2.
- Harry Moore (Derbyshire) made his first-class debut, and took his maiden first-class wicket.
- Martin Andersson was on loan from Middlesex for the remainder of the season, having signed a two-year deal with Derbyshire to begin in 2025.
- In Northamptonshire's first innings, all seven bowlers used by Derbyshire (including Moore) took a wicket for only the second time in their history.
- Yuzvendra Chahal finished with career-best match figures of 9/99.
- Points: Northamptonshire 19, Derbyshire 3

9–12 September 2024 (Round 12)
Scorecard

Glamorgan	v	Sussex
186 (57.3 overs); Kiran Carlson 56 (81); Jaydev Unadkat 4/52 (15 overs)		491 (132 overs); John Simpson 117 (160); Ben Kellaway 5/142 (43 overs)
218 (72.2 overs); Colin Ingram 71 (102); Ollie Robinson 3/38 (17 overs)

Sussex won by an innings and 87 runs
County Ground, Hove
Umpires: Nigel Llong and Sue Redfern

- Sussex won the toss and elected to field.
- John Simpson (Sussex) passed the 1,000 run mark for the season.
- Points: Sussex 23, Glamorgan 1

17–20 September 2024 (Round 13)
Scorecard

Derbyshire	v	Middlesex
173 (61.2 overs); Harry Came 66 (132); Toby Roland-Jones 5/34 (17 overs)		358 (107.3 overs); Mark Stoneman 115 (223); Jack Morley 3/76 (30.3 overs)
119 (38.4 overs); Wayne Madsen 32 (59); Toby Roland-Jones 5/38 (13 overs)

Middlesex won by an innings and 66 runs
County Ground, Derby
Umpires: Hassan Adnan and Paul Baldwin

- Derbyshire won the toss and elected to bat
- Points: Middlesex 22, Derbyshire 3

17–20 September 2024 (Round 13)
Scorecard

Glamorgan	v	Yorkshire
239 (68.5 overs); Colin Ingram 82 (117); Matthew Fisher 4/55 (18 overs)		361 (91.1 overs); George Hill 90 (115); Andy Gorvin 4/67 (22.1)
209 (67.5 overs); Asa Tribe 58 (155); Ben Coad 4/51 (20 overs)		273 (65.5 overs); Finlay Bean 57 (93); James Harris 5/73 (17.5 overs)

Yorkshire won by 186 runs
Sophia Gardens, Cardiff
Umpires: David Millns and Naeem Ashraf

- Glamorgan won the toss and elected to field.
- Ben Morris (Glamorgan) made his first-class debut.
- In Yorkshire's second innings, Ben Morris took his maiden first-class wicket, whilst James Harris claimed his 600th.
- Points: Yorkshire 22, Glamorgan 3

17–20 September 2024 (Round 13)
Scorecard

Gloucestershire	v	Sussex
109 (43.4 overs); Tom Price 25 (62); Jaydev Unadkat 4/32 (13 overs)		311 (92.5 overs); Jack Carson 71 (94); Zafar Gohar 6/76 (26.5 overs)
195 (72.1 overs); Chris Dent 61 (158); Henry Crocombe 4/22 (6.1 overs)

Sussex won by an innings and 7 runs
County Ground, Bristol
Umpires: Neil Bainton and Rob Bailey

- Gloucestershire won the toss and elected to bat
- Bertie Foreman (Sussex) made his first-class debut.
- Sussex gained promotion to division one.
- Points: Sussex 21, Gloucestershire 3

17–20 September 2024 (Round 13)
Scorecard

Northamptonshire	v	Leicestershire
383 (91.2 overs); James Sales 135 (197); Ian Holland 4/53 (12 overs)		203 (62.3 overs); Sol Budinger 56 (94); Yuzvendra Chahal 4/82 (23 overs)
137/1 (30.3 overs); Luke Procter 68* (76); Sam Wood 1/32 (8 overs)		316 (102.1 overs); Scott Currie 120 (192); Yuzvendra Chahal 5/134 (43 overs)

Northamptonshire won by 9 wickets
County Ground, Northampton
Umpires: Anthony Harris and Paul Pollard

- Leicestershire won the toss and elected to bat
- James Sales hit a career-best score.
- Scott Currie recorded his maiden first-class century.
- In Leicestershire's second innings, Ben Sanderson claimed his 400th first-class wicket.
- Points: Northamptonshire 22, Leicestershire 3

26–29 September 2024 (Round 14)
Scorecard

Glamorgan	v	Gloucestershire
381/4d (85.3 overs); Chris Cooke 101* (121); Matt Taylor 3/71 (19 overs)		Forfeit
Forfeit		189 (63.5 overs); Joe Phillips 64 (115); Andy Gorvin 3/22 (13 overs)

Glamorgan won by 192 runs
Sophia Gardens, Cardiff
Umpires: Mark Newell and Simon Widdup

- Rain prevented any play on day 1, and reduced that on day 2 to 65.2 overs.
- After the time lost to bad weather, both captains agreed to forfeit an innings in orders to avoid the teams playing out a draw.
- Glamorgan were deducted 1 point for a slow over rate.
- Points: Glamorgan 18, Gloucestershire 1

26–29 September 2024 (Round 14)
Scorecard

Leicestershire	v	Derbyshire
280 (87.1 overs); Sol Budinger 87 (67); David Lloyd 3/43 (17 overs)		252/3d (65 overs); Wayne Madsen 105* (123); Ben Green 1/27 (6 overs)

Match drawn
Grace Road, Leicester
Umpires: Neil Bainton and Nigel Llong

- Derbyshire won the toss and elected to field.
- There was no play on day 1 and day 2 due to rain.
- Alex Green (Leicestershire) made his first-class debut.
- Points: Leicestershire 10, Derbyshire 12

26–29 September 2024 (Round 14)
Scorecard

Sussex	v	Middlesex
459/4d (108.3 overs); James Coles 132* (150); Tom Helm 2/45 (11 overs)		271 (44.3 overs); Sam Robson 113 (103); James Coles 4/61 (9.3 overs)

Match drawn
County Ground, Hove
Umpires: Paul Pollard and Surendiran Shanmugam

- Sussex won the toss and elected to field.
- There was no play on day 1 and day 2 due to rain.
- Points: Sussex 16, Middlesex 10

26–29 September 2024 (Round 14)
Scorecard

Yorkshire	v	Northamptonshire
726/7d (141 overs); James Wharton 285 (319); Fateh Singh 3/193 (40 overs)		147 (53.3 overs); George Bartlett 64 (92); Ben Coad 4/51 (19 overs)
		71/2 (13 overs); Gus Miller 22 (19); Matthew Fisher 2/16 (6 overs)

Match drawn
Headingley Cricket Ground, Leeds
Umpires: Chris Watts and Hassan Adnan

- Yorkshire won the toss and elected to field.
- There was no play on day 1 due to rain.
- Krish Patel and Fateh Singh (Northamptonshire) both made their first-class debuts.
- Yorkshire's first innings total was their second highest ever in first-class cricket.
- It was also the highest ever first-class total in a match at Headingley.
- James Wharton hit his first double century, surpassing his previous career-best score by 97 runs.
- In Northamptonshire's first innings, Ben Coad took his 300th first-class wicket.
- Matthew Fisher completed his last match as a Yorkshire player.
- Points: Yorkshire 16, Northamptonshire 9

== Standings ==
Teams in both divisions played a total of 14 games, with seven home matches and seven away matches. There was a two-up, two-down promotion and relegation system.

Teams received 16 points for a win, and 8 for a draw or tie. Bonus points could be earned during the first 110 overs of each team's first innings, with up to 5 for batting and 3 for bowling available.

Bonus points awarded
Runs scored	Wickets taken	Points
250–299	3–5	1
300–349	6–8	2
350–399	9–10	3
400–449		4
450 or more		5

If a match was abandoned without a ball being bowled, then each team was awarded 8 points. If abandoned once a game has started because the pitch was deemed to be unsafe, then the home side received no points. The away side were awarded 8 points plus whatever bonus points had accrued.

=== Division One ===
Pos	Team	Pld	W	L	T	D	A	Bat	Bowl	Ded	Pts	
1	Surrey	14	8	2	0	4	0	34	37	0	231	Champions
2	Hampshire	14	6	1	0	6	1	31	33	2	214	
3	Somerset	14	5	3	0	6	0	28	40	0	196	
4	Essex	14	6	3	0	5	0	34	36	12	194	
5	Durham	14	4	4	0	5	1	30	30	1	171	
6	Worcestershire	14	3	4	0	7	0	21	37	0	162	
7	Warwickshire	14	1	4	0	9	0	33	38	0	159	
8	Nottinghamshire	14	2	4	0	8	0	25	35	1	155	
9	Lancashire	14	3	6	0	5	0	15	34	3	134	Relegation to Division 2
10	Kent	14	1	8	0	5	0	12	32	1	99	Relegation to Division 2

Source: ESPNcricinfo, ECB, BBC

=== Division Two ===
Pos	Team	Pld	W	L	T	D	A	Bat	Bowl	Ded	Pts	
1	Sussex	14	8	2	0	4	0	40	40	3	237	Promotion to Division 1
2	Yorkshire	14	5	2	0	7	0	41	40	0	217	Promotion to Division 1
3	Middlesex	14	5	2	0	7	0	28	32	0	196	
4	Northamptonshire	14	2	3	0	9	0	22	35	0	161	
5	Leicestershire	14	1	3	0	10	0	28	31	0	155	
6	Glamorgan	14	2	4	1	7	0	22	30	2	146	
7	Gloucestershire	14	2	5	1	5	1	27	29	2	142	
8	Derbyshire	14	1	6	0	6	1	20	31	1	122	

Source: ESPNcricinfo, ECB, BBC

== Leading players ==
=== Division One ===
Leading run scorers (Division One)
Player	County	Matches	Runs	High score	Average	100	50
David Bedingham	Durham	11	1,331	279	78.29	6	3
Dean Elgar	Essex	14	1,144	182	57.20	4	5
Alex Davies	Warwickshire	14	1,115	256	50.68	4	3
Haseeb Hameed	Nottinghamshire	14	1,091	247*	51.95	3	4
Rory Burns	Surrey	14	1,073	227	53.65	3	5
Will Rhodes	Warwickshire	14	1,020	201	48.57	3	3
Keaton Jennings	Lancashire	14	1,006	187*	45.72	4	3
James Vince	Hampshire	13	986	211	49.30	2	5
Liam Dawson	Hampshire	13	956	120	59.75	3	5
Ben Slater	Nottinghamshire	14	949	168*	45.19	2	5

Leading wicket takers (Division One)
Player	County	Matches	Overs	Wickets	Average	Best	5W
Jamie Porter	Essex	14	362.0	56	19.25	6/36	4
Kyle Abbott	Hampshire	13	382.2	55	20.36	5/25	5
Liam Dawson	Hampshire	13	509.3	54	25.14	5/47	5
Dan Worrall	Surrey	11	331.1	52	16.15	6/22	2
Oliver Hannon-Dalby	Warwickshire	14	380.3	50	22.28	6/43	3
Jack Leach	Somerset	9	395.2	45	22.27	7/50	5
Simon Harmer	Essex	14	492.5	45	33.15	4/16	0
Sam Cook	Essex	11	269.1	43	17.30	6/14	2
Shane Snater	Essex	14	272.0	41	22.12	5/13	1
Jordan Clark	Surrey	13	329.0	38	25.97	5/65	1

=== Division Two ===
Leading run scorers (Division Two)
Player	County	Matches	Runs	High score	Average	100	50
Colin Ingram	Glamorgan	11	1,351	257*	90.06	5	6
Adam Lyth	Yorkshire	14	1,215	147	57.85	5	5
John Simpson	Sussex	14	1,197	205*	74.81	5	4
Ryan Higgins	Middlesex	13	1,133	221	70.81	5	2
James Bracey	Gloucestershire	13	1,089	207*	60.50	4	3
Wayne Madsen	Derbyshire	13	1,005	138	50.25	3	5
Sam Northeast	Glamorgan	14	1,004	335*	50.20	3	2
Max Holden	Middlesex	14	981	211*	49.05	2	5
Leus du Plooy	Middlesex	14	955	196*	50.26	2	5
Luke Procter	Northamptonshire	14	923	116*	48.57	1	7

Leading wicket takers (Division Two)
Player	County	Matches	Overs	Wickets	Average	Best	5W
Ben Coad	Yorkshire	12	334.3	56	15.80	6/30	3
Toby Roland-Jones	Middlesex	12	353.0	52	22.55	6/58	7
Jack Carson	Sussex	14	352.1	50	22.46	6/67	3
Ben Sanderson	Northamptonshire	12	374.3	41	26.73	6/64	3
Ollie Robinson	Sussex	12	343.2	39	25.53	4/42	0
Jordan Thompson	Yorkshire	12	264.5	32	30.78	5/80	1
Zak Chappell	Derbyshire	12	261.1	31	30.41	6/47	2
Timm van der Gugten	Leicestershire	7	228.3	30	21.96	5/59	2
Marchant de Lange	Gloucestershire	6	216.0	30	26.93	6/49	0
Ryan Higgins	Middlesex	13	274.1	30	28.60	4/31	0

Ethan Bamber (Middlesex) and James Harris (Glamorgan) also took 30 wickets, but had a higher average than Ryan Higgins.
