= Gus Miller =

Gus Miller may refer to:

- Gus Miller (coach) (1900–1992), American football and basketball coach and college athletics administrator
- Gus Miller (cricketer) (born 2002), English cricketer
- Gus Miller (politician) (1852–1918), Australian politician
