= Ryan Patel =

English cricketer (born 1997)

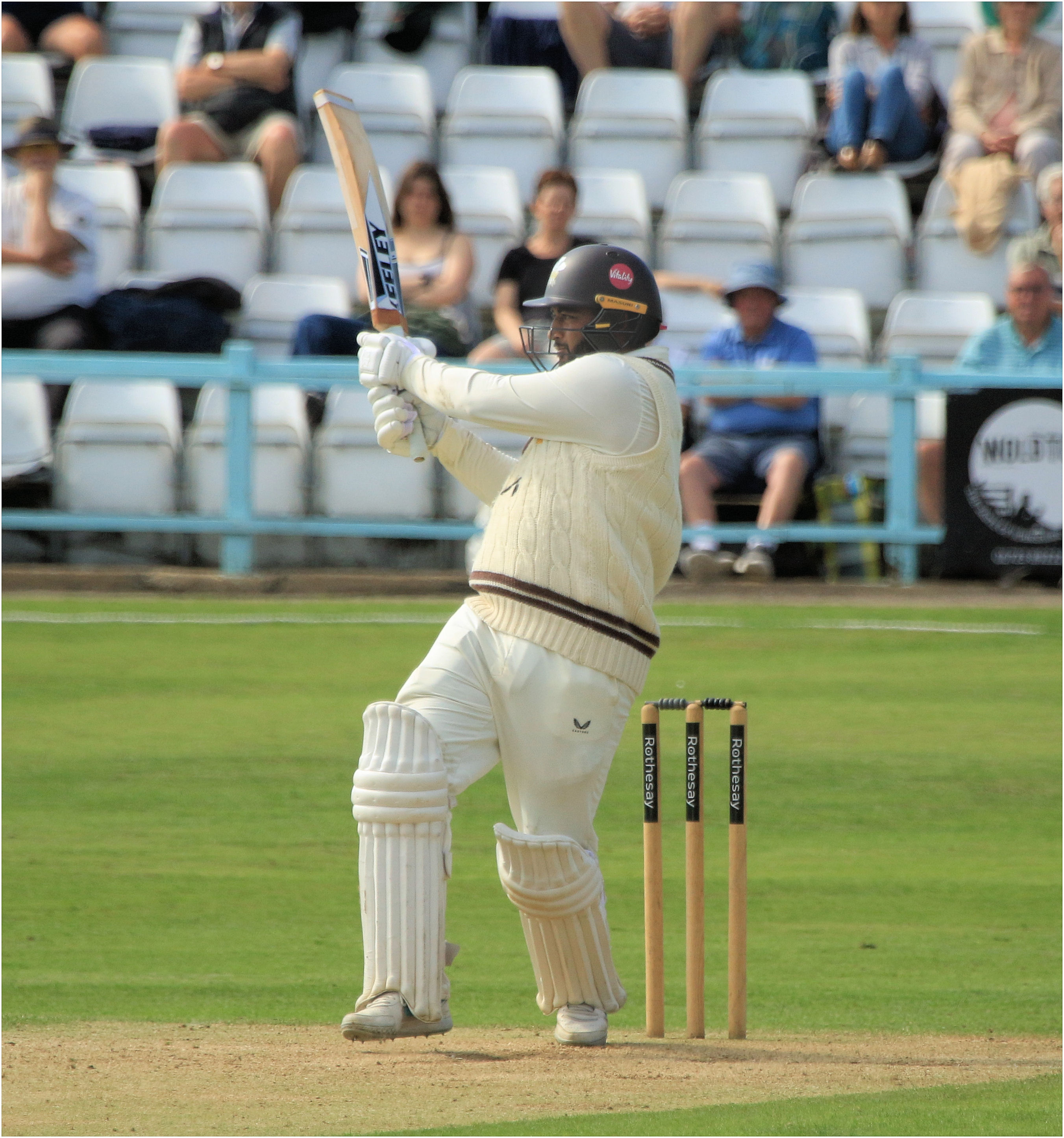
- Patel in 2025

Personal information
- Full name: Ryan Samir Patel
- Born: 26 October 1997 (age 29); Sutton, London, England
- Height: 5 ft 10 in (1.78 m)
- Batting: Left-handed
- Bowling: Right-arm medium
- Role: Batting all-rounder

Domestic team information
- Years: Team
- 2017–present: Surrey (squad no. 26)
- First-class debut: 28 August 2017 Surrey v Middlesex
- List A debut: 30 April 2019 Surrey v Hampshire

Career statistics
Competition	FC	LA	T20
Matches	83	46	13
Runs scored	3,606	1,968	88
Batting average	31.08	48.00	11.00
100s/50s	6/15	5/13	0/0
Top score	134	131	30
Balls bowled	2,302	697	21
Wickets	23	16	0
Bowling average	59.82	43.00	–
5 wickets in innings	1	0	–
10 wickets in match	0	0	–
Best bowling	6/5	3/44	–
Catches/stumpings	50/–	18/–	2/–
- Source: Cricinfo, 27 September 2026

Ryan Samir Patel (born 26 October 1997) is an English cricketer who plays for Surrey.

== Career ==
He made his first-class debut in the 2017 County Championship on 28 August 2017.

In June 2018, during the 2018 County Championship match against Somerset, he took his maiden five-wicket haul in first-class cricket, with six wickets for five runs in eleven balls. Patel was part of the Surrey team that won the 2018 County Championship.

He made his List A debut on 30 April 2019, for Surrey in the 2019 Royal London One-Day Cup. He made his Twenty20 debut on 26 July 2019, for Surrey in the 2019 t20 Blast. Patel was part of the Surrey team that won the 2022, 2023 and 2024 County Championship seasons.
