= Sam Wood (cricketer, born 2004) =

English cricketer (born 2004)

Personal information
- Full name: Samuel Berridge Wood
- Born: 11 September 2004 (age 22); Leicester, Leicestershire, England
- Height: 6 ft 4 in (1.93 m)
- Batting: Left-handed
- Bowling: Right-arm medium
- Role: All-rounder

Domestic team information
- Years: Team
- 2024–2026: Leicestershire
- 2026: → Nottinghamshire (loan)
- FC debut: 29 August 2024 Leicestershire v Glamorgan
- LA debut: 6 August 2024 Leicestershire v Surrey

Career statistics
Competition	FC	LA	T20
Matches	6	5	10
Runs scored	172	68	22
Batting average	24.57	17.00	22.00
100s/50s	0/1	0/0	0/0
Top score	57*	22	18*
Balls bowled	680	210	156
Wickets	4	2	6
Bowling average	108.25	111.50	41.83
5 wickets in innings	0	0	0
10 wickets in match	0	0	0
Best bowling	1/32	1/34	1/21
Catches/stumpings	2/–	1/–	2/–
- Source: Cricinfo, 18 August 2026

Samuel Berridge Wood (born 11 September 2004) is an English cricketer who has played for Leicestershire and Nottinghamshire. He is a left handed batsman and right arm medium pace bowler. He was born at Markfield at Leicester and he played for Leicestershire as an all-rounder.

== Career ==
He signed a professional contract with Leicestershire in December 2023. He made his T20 debut for Leicestershire against Nottinghamshire in the 2024 T20 Blast on 5 July 2024. He made his List A debut against Surrey in One-Day Cup debut on 6 August 2024. He made his first-class debut against Glamorgan in 2024 County Championship on 29 August 2024.
