= Cameron Steel =

English cricketer (born 1995)

Personal information
- Full name: Cameron Tate Steel
- Born: 13 September 1995 (age 31); Greenbrae, California, U.S.
- Batting: Right-handed
- Bowling: Right arm leg break
- Role: All-rounder

Domestic team information
- Years: Team
- 2014–2016: Middlesex (squad no. 22)
- 2014–2016: Durham MCCU
- 2017–2021: Durham (squad no. 14)
- 2021: → Hampshire (on loan)
- 2021: → Surrey (on loan)
- 2022–2026: Surrey (squad no. 44)
- FC debut: 1 April 2014 Durham MCCU v Derbyshire
- LA debut: 27 April 2017 Durham v Derbyshire

Career statistics
| Competition | FC | LA | T20 |
|---|---|---|---|
| Matches | 66 | 42 | 24 |
| Runs scored | 2,733 | 666 | 165 |
| Batting average | 27.05 | 20.18 | 16.50 |
| 100s/50s | 4/13 | 0/5 | 0/0 |
| Top score | 224 | 77 | 37 |
| Balls bowled | 3,024 | 1,477 | 264 |
| Wickets | 60 | 45 | 12 |
| Bowling average | 35.18 | 32.00 | 36.33 |
| 5 wickets in innings | 2 | 0 | 0 |
| 10 wickets in match | 0 | 0 | 0 |
| Best bowling | 5/25 | 4/33 | 3/41 |
| Catches/stumpings | 30/– | 19/– | 12/– |
- Source: ESPNcricinfo, 26 August 2025

Cameron Tate Steel (born 13 September 1995) is an English and American former cricketer who played as a right-handed batter and right arm leg spinner at the domestic level in England from 2014 to 2026.

== Career ==
While studying at Durham University, Steel made his first-class debut for Durham MCCU against Derbyshire on 1 April 2014. In October 2016, after his release from Middlesex, Steel signed for Durham ahead of the 2017 season. He made his List A debut for Durham in the 2017 Royal London One-Day Cup on 27 April 2017. He made his Twenty20 cricket debut for Durham in the 2017 NatWest t20 Blast on 23 July 2017. In 2017 he scored 224 for Durham against Leicestershire.

Born in California, Steel holds a United States passport. In June 2019, he was named in a 30-man training squad for the United States cricket team, ahead of the Regional Finals of the 2018–19 ICC T20 World Cup Americas Qualifier tournament in Bermuda.

On 18 April 2021, Steel signed for Hampshire on a two-month loan deal. On 16 July 2021 Steel signed for Surrey on a two-year contract until the end of the 2023 season. For the remainder of the 2021 season he joined Surrey on loan Steel was part of the Surrey team that won the 2022 County Championship.

On 18 September 2023, Steel signed a new multi-year contract extension at Surrey. In the opening three rounds of the 2024 County Championship he was the competition's highest wicket-taker, with 20 wickets.

Steel retired from cricket in April 2026 due to complications from an ankle injury he suffered in 2024.
