= Yadvinder Singh =

English cricketer

Personal information
- Full name: Yadvinder Singh
- Born: January 18, 1996 (age 30); Rajasthan, India
- Batting: Right-handed
- Bowling: Right-arm medium fast
- Role: Bowler

Domestic team information
- Years: Team
- 2024–2025: Worcestershire
- 2026: Leicestershire
- First-class debut: 17 May 2024 Worcestershire v Surrey

Career statistics
Competition	FC
Matches	3
Runs scored	26
Batting average	8.66
100s/50s	0/0
Top score	14*
Balls bowled	363
Wickets	7
Bowling average	46.14
5 wickets in innings	0
10 wickets in match	0
Best bowling	4/103
Catches/stumpings	0/–
- Source: ESPNcricinfo, 7 April 2026

Yadvinder Singh (born 18 January 1996) is an English cricketer, who is a right-arm medium fast bowler and plays for Leicestershire.

== Career ==
Born in Rajasthan, Yadvinder started playing cricket at 17. He moved to England in 2011 and played club cricket for Moseley, leading them to win the 2023 Birmingham and District Premier League with 39 wickets. He is a graduate of the South Asian Cricket Academy (SACA). In January 2024, he signed a professional contract for the first time by Worcestershire County Cricket Club, becoming the second player from SACA to join the club. He made his first-class debut for Worcestershire on 17 May 2024, against Surrey in the 2024 County Championship.
