= Matthew Hurst =

English cricketer (born 2003)

Personal information
- Full name: Matthew Frederick Hurst
- Born: 10 December 2003 (age 22); Billinge, Wigan, England
- Batting: Right-handed
- Role: Wicket-keeper

Domestic team information
- Years: Team
- 2023–present: Lancashire (squad no. 21)
- 2024–2025: Manchester Originals
- 2024/25: Perth Scorchers
- FC debut: 19 September 2023 Lancashire v Nottinghamshire
- LA debut: 1 August 2023 Lancashire v Essex

Career statistics
Competition	FC	LA	T20
Matches	42	16	48
Runs scored	2,017	303	808
Batting average	32.01	25.25	18.79
100s/50s	2/13	0/2	0/4
Top score	106	66	78
Catches/stumpings	120/4	9/0	27/3
- Source: CricInfo, 27 September 2026

Matthew Frederick Hurst (born 10 December 2003) is an English cricketer who plays for Lancashire County Cricket Club and Perth Scorchers in Australia's Big Bash League. Hurst is a right-handed batsman and wicket-keeper. He made his List-A debut for Lancashire against Essex on 1 August 2023. The following month he made his first class debut against Nottinghamshire.

== Early life ==
From Billinge, Merseyside, Hurst attended Byrchall High School and Winstanley College. He has played club cricket at Newton le Willows CC and Leigh CC. He made his debut for the Lancashire Second XI in 2020.

== Domestic career ==
Hurst signed a rookie contract with Lancashire in September 2022. He made his List-A debut for Lancashire on 1 August 2023 against Essex. He scored his first half century on 20 August 2023 against Middlesex when he scored 66 from 42 balls.

On his first-class debut, he scored an unbeaten half century against Nottinghamshire in September 2023 in Division One of the County Championship. The following week he hit a new top score as he hit an unbeaten 76 against Kent.

In May 2024, he hit a first-class century for the first time, scoring 104 against Nottinghamshire. He signed a new three-year contract with Lancashire after the conclusion of the 2024 season.

In September 2024, Hurst was drafted by the Perth Scorchers for the 2024–25 BBL.

== International career ==
An England U19 international, he scored a century against Sri Lanka U19 in 2022. He was selected for the U19 Ashes away against Australia U19 in the 2022-23 winter. He was a substitute fielder for the senior England team during the 2023 home Ashes series. In October 2024, he was named in the England Lions squad for their tour of South Africa.
