= Luke Procter =

English cricketer (born 1988)

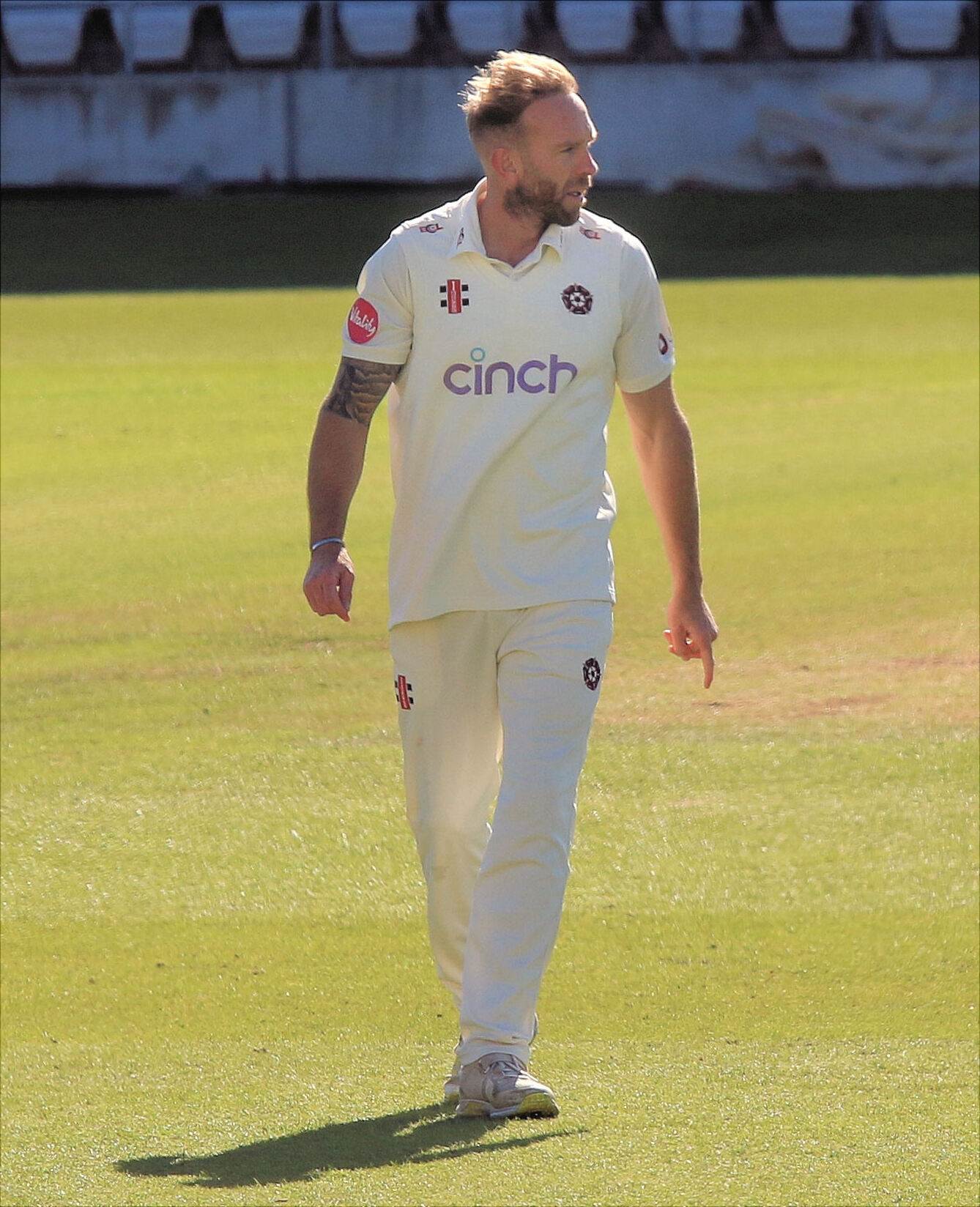
- Procter in 2024

Personal information
- Full name: Luke Anthony Procter
- Born: 24 June 1988 (age 38); Oldham, Greater Manchester, England
- Batting: Left-handed
- Bowling: Right-arm medium-fast
- Role: All-rounder; Captain

Domestic team information
- Years: Team
- 2009–2017: Lancashire (squad no. 2)
- 2017: → Northamptonshire (on loan)
- 2018–present: Northamptonshire (squad no. 2)
- First-class debut: 17 May 2010 Lancashire v Warwickshire
- List A debut: 27 September 2009 Lancashire v Warwickshire

Career statistics
Competition	FC	LA	T20
Matches	175	69	54
Runs scored	8,814	1,210	369
Batting average	35.11	29.51	18.45
100s/50s	11/51	0/7	0/0
Top score	261*	97	33*
Balls bowled	13,632	2,162	569
Wickets	210	49	30
Bowling average	35.94	41.28	29.23
5 wickets in innings	5	0	0
10 wickets in match	0	0	0
Best bowling	7/71	4/34	3/22
Catches/stumpings	44/–	13/–	16/–
- Source: ESPNcricinfo, 27 September 2026

Luke Anthony Procter (born 24 June 1988) is an English cricketer. He is a left-handed batsman and right-arm medium-fast bowler who captains Northamptonshire in first-class cricket.

== Career ==
Born in Oldham, Greater Manchester, Procter played for Cumberland in the Minor Counties Trophy in 2007.

He first represented Lancashire in the Second XI Championship in 2006, made his List A debut in September 2009, against Warwickshire, opening the batting with Tom Smith, Procter scored 2 runs and suffered a broken thumb. Procter graduated from Lancashire's cricket academy, and after impressing for the Second XI in 2009 (the year he was granted a scholarship) he signed his first professional contract with the club.

In March 2010 Lancashire went to the Caribbean to prepare for the upcoming English season. In a friendly match against Yorkshire Procter suffered a broken left hand while fielding, preventing him from playing cricket for several weeks. He went on to make his County Championship debut in May that year against Warwickshire; he scored 13 runs in the first innings and bowled a single over but he was replaced by fast-bowler James Anderson for the second innings. Procter played one further County Championship match that year in September; he made scores of 19 and 32 and took his maiden first-class wicket, that of Nick Compton leg before wicket.

Procter's first County Championship match of 2011 was against Sussex in which he scored his first half-century. His innings of 89 runs from 170 balls included five sixes off the bowling of spinner Monty Panesar. He scored one further first-class fifty in 2011 and that year he played seven matches in the County Championship, which was more than he anticipated. Scoring 366 runs, Procter's average of 40.66 was the best for Lancashire in 2011. In the last match of the season, Lancashire won the County Championship for the first time since 1950 when they shared the title.

He joined Northamptonshire in October 2017 and became the club's red-ball captain in 2023.

Proctor scored a first-class career-best 261 not out for Northamptonshire in their County Championship match against Kent at the County Cricket Ground, Northampton in April 2026.
