= Che Simmons =

Barbadian cricketer

Personal information
- Full name: Che Brendon Simmons
- Born: 18 December 2003 (age 22)
- Batting: Right-handed
- Bowling: Right arm fast

Domestic team information
- Years: Team
- 2024–2025: Warwickshire (squad no. 99)
- 2026–: Gloucestershire
- FC debut: 17 May 2024 Warwickshire v Essex

Career statistics
| Competition | First-class |
|---|---|
| Matches | 5 |
| Runs scored | 59 |
| Batting average | 8.42 |
| 100s/50s | 0/0 |
| Top score | 17 |
| Balls bowled | 534 |
| Wickets | 12 |
| Bowling average | 30.91 |
| 5 wickets in innings | 0 |
| 10 wickets in match | 0 |
| Best bowling | 3/12 |
| Catches/stumpings | 1/– |
- Source: ESPNcricinfo, 26 September 2026

Che Brendon Simmons (born 18 December 2003) is a Barbadian cricketer who plays for Gloucestershire County Cricket Club. He is a right arm fast bowler and right handed batsman. He made his first class debut in May 2024 for Warwickshire against Essex.

== Early life ==
He was born and raised in Barbados. He attended Combermere School and represented Barbados Under-15s. He once claimed all 10 wickets in an innings while playing for the Franklyn Stephenson Academy, finishing with figures of 10 for 16 from 5.3 overs. The possessor of a UK passport through his father, he signed for Warwickshire County Cricket Club in June 2021 following a trial, having been recommended to Warwickshire's director of sport, Paul Farbrace, by fellow Barbadian fast bowler Ottis Gibson.

== Career ==
Having joined the Warwickshire County Cricket Club academy in 2021, he signed a three-year contract with the county in 2022.

He made his first-class debut for Warwickshire on 17 May 2024 against Essex, and had an immediate impact on debut taking three wickets in 15 balls in the County Championship match at Chelmsford and finished the Essex first innings with figures of 3/12. He signed a new contract in August 2024, keeping him at the county until 2026.

In September 2026, he signed for Gloucestershire County Cricket Club initially on loan ahead of a permanent move in 2027 on a two-year contract.

== Style of play ==
His fast and fluid bowling style has been compared to Jofra Archer.

== Personal life ==
Eligible to play for the West Indies by birth, he opted-out of a West Indies U19 training camp in 2021 ahead of the U19 World Cup. He qualified to play for England on residency grounds in 2024.
