= Ben Coad =

English cricketer (born 1994)

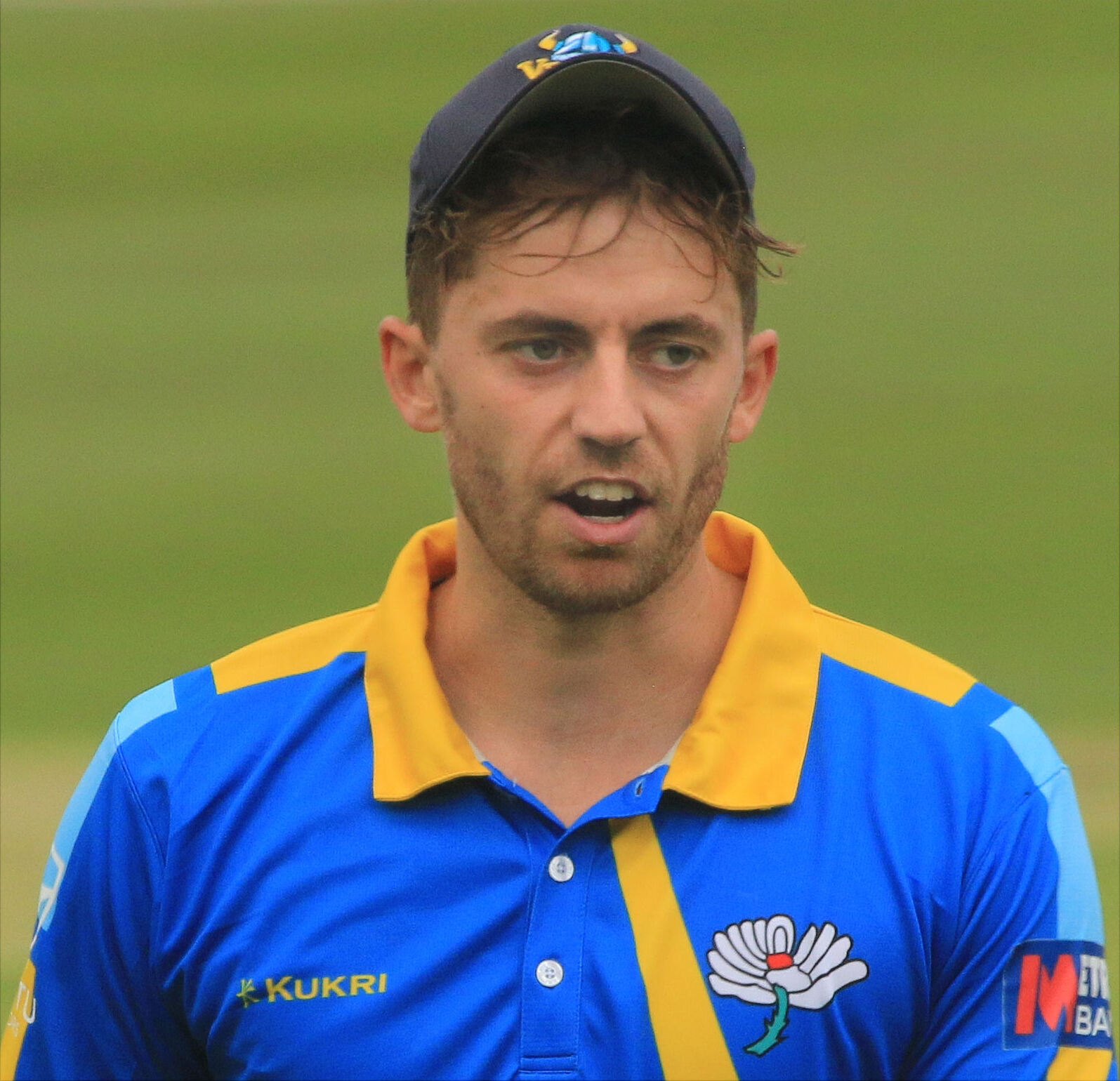
- Coad in 2023

Personal information
- Full name: Benjamin Oliver Coad
- Born: 10 January 1994 (age 32); Harrogate, North Yorkshire, England
- Batting: Right-handed
- Bowling: Right-arm fast-medium
- Role: Bowler

Domestic team information
- Years: Team
- 2013–present: Yorkshire (squad no. 10)
- First-class debut: 20 June 2016 Yorkshire v Durham
- List A debut: 2 June 2013 Yorkshire v Gloucestershire

Career statistics
Competition	FC	LA	T20
Matches	91	54	12
Runs scored	1,266	225	14
Batting average	15.07	18.75	4.66
100s/50s	0/2	0/0	0/0
Top score	89	45	7
Balls bowled	15,926	2,661	217
Wickets	347	76	13
Bowling average	20.33	25.96	24.84
5 wickets in innings	14	2	0
10 wickets in match	2	0	0
Best bowling	6/25	5/12	3/40
Catches/stumpings	7/–	10/–	6/–
- Source: ESPNcricinfo, 26 September 2026

Benjamin Oliver Coad (born 10 January 1994) is an English cricketer who plays for Yorkshire County Cricket Club.

== Early life and education ==
Coad was born on 10 January 1994 in Harrogate, North Yorkshire, England. He was educated at Thirsk School and Sixth Form College, a state secondary school in Sowerby, Thirsk, North Yorkshire.

== Cricket career ==
Coad made his county debut on 2 June 2013 in the 2013 Yorkshire Bank 40 fixture against Gloucestershire. His maiden first-class match was for Yorkshire against Durham at the Riverside Ground in Chester-le-Street, which started on 20 June 2016. He had figures of 0-38, and 1-70 when bowling, and scored 17 not out in his only innings. In February 2025, Coad signed a new contract with Yorkshire which tied him into the club until the end of the 2028 season.
