= Dom Goodman =

English cricketer (born 2000)

Personal information
- Full name: Dominic Charles Goodman
- Born: 23 October 2000 (age 26); Ashford, Kent, England
- Batting: Right-handed
- Bowling: Right-arm fast-medium

Domestic team information
- Years: Team
- 2021–2025: Gloucestershire (squad no. 83)
- 2026: Sussex (squad no. 83)
- FC debut: 15 April 2021 Gloucestershire v Somerset
- LA debut: 7 August 2022 Gloucestershire v Somerset

Career statistics
Competition	FC	LA
Matches	19	11
Runs scored	152	21
Batting average	7.23	3.50
100s/50s	0/0	0/0
Top score	38*	15
Balls bowled	2,397	480
Wickets	41	13
Bowling average	32.46	35.76
5 wickets in innings	1	0
10 wickets in match	0	0
Best bowling	5/54	4/43
Catches/stumpings	8/–	2/–
- Source: Cricinfo, 26 September 2026

Dominic Charles Goodman (born 23 October 2000) is an English cricketer. He made his first-class debut on 15 April 2021, for Gloucestershire in the 2021 County Championship. He made his List A debut on 7 August 2022, for Gloucestershire in the 2022 Royal London One-Day Cup.

Goodman was born in Ashford, Kent. He attended Dr Challoner's Grammar School in Amersham. Having moved to Bristol, he studied at Clifton College before moving on to the University of Exeter. As a young cricketer he represented Buckinghamshire at age-group level. He joined the academy at Gloucestershire in 2017, and signed his first professional contract with the club in 2020.
