= Gus Miller (cricketer) =

English cricketer (born 2002)

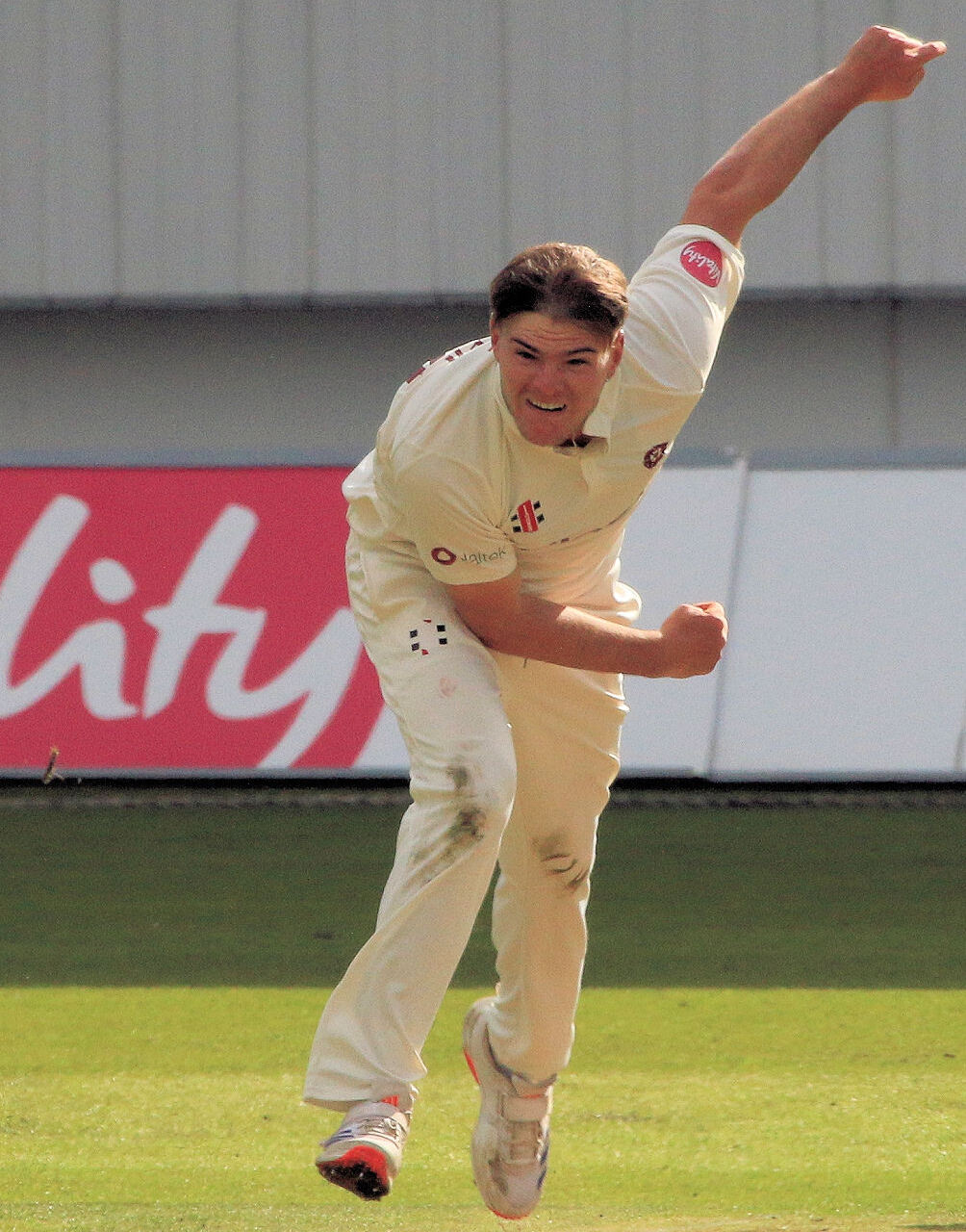
- Miller in 2024

Personal information
- Full name: Augustus Horatio Miller
- Born: 8 January 2002 (age 24); Oxford, England
- Batting: Right-handed
- Bowling: Right-arm medium-fast

Domestic team information
- Years: Team
- 2022–present: Northamptonshire (squad no. 24)
- First-class debut: 23 June 2024 Northamptonshire v Glamorgan
- List A debut: 9 August 2022 Northamptonshire v Hampshire

Career statistics
Competition	FC	LA	T20
Matches	9	21	8
Runs scored	293	470	22
Batting average	19.53	31.33	7.33
100s/50s	0/1	1/1	0/0
Top score	61	115	8*
Balls bowled	216	520	12
Wickets	1	6	0
Bowling average	216.00	86.33	–
5 wickets in innings	0	0	–
10 wickets in match	0	0	–
Best bowling	1/43	1/19	–
Catches/stumpings	2/–	6/–	2/–
- Source: ESPNcricinfo, 27 September 2026

Augustus Horatio Miller (born 8 January 2002) is an English cricketer. He is a right-handed batsman and right-arm medium-fast bowler who plays for Northamptonshire.

== Career ==
Born in Oxford, Miller played for Bedfordshire in the Minor Counties Championship in 2018, Minor Counties Trophy in 2021 and Minor Counties Twenty20 in 2022. In October 2021, he signed rookie contract with Northamptonshire. In April 2023, he signed his first professional contract with Northamptonshire County Cricket Club.

He made his Twenty20 (T20) debut for Northamptonshire against India on 3 July 2022. He made his List A debut for Northamptonshire against Hampshire in the 2022 One-Day Cup, on 9 August 2022. He made his first-class debut for Northamptonshire against Glamorgan in the 2024 County Championship, on 23 June 2024. Miller signed a one-year contract extension with Northamptonshire in September 2024, tying him to the club until the end of the 2026 season. In September 2026, he agreed a further year-long deal running until the end of the 2027 season.
