= 2020 T20 Blast =

Cricket tournament

2020 Vitality Blast
- Dates: 27 August – 4 October 2020
- Administrator: England and Wales Cricket Board
- Cricket format: Twenty20
- Tournament format(s): Group stage and knockout
- Champions: Notts Outlaws (2nd title)
- Participants: 18
- Matches: 97
- Most runs: Daniel Bell-Drummond (423)
- Most wickets: Jake Ball (19)
- Official website: Vitality Blast

The 2020 Vitality Blast was the eighteenth edition of the T20 Blast currently known as the Vitality Blast, a professional Twenty20 cricket league being played in England and Wales. run by the England and Wales Cricket Board (ECB), which was branded as the Vitality Blast due to the tournament's sponsorship deal. On 12 August 2020, following a delay due to the COVID-19 pandemic, the ECB confirmed the fixtures for the tournament.

In the North Group, the Notts Outlaws and Lancashire Lightning qualified for the quarter-finals. In the Central Group, Gloucestershire became the first team to qualify. The South Group saw Surrey and Kent Spitfires qualify. Following the conclusion of the group stage, the Northants Steelbacks, the Leicestershire Foxes and the Sussex Sharks had also confirmed their spots in the quarter-finals.

Surrey, Lancashire Lightning and Gloucestershire all won their quarter-final matches to progress to Finals Day. The match between the Leicestershire Foxes and the Notts Outlaws finished in a tie. The Notts Outlaws advanced to Finals Day after they had scored more runs in the powerplay.

For the first time in the tournament's history, Finals Day was washed out, with all the matches rescheduled to be played on 4 October 2020, the designated reserve day. If no play was possible on the reserve day, the ECB announced that the matches would have been played on 7 October 2020. Play was delayed further on the reserve day due to rain, and as a result the two semi-finals were reduced to 11 overs per side, and the final was shortened to 16 overs per side. Surrey beat Gloucestershire by six wickets in the first semi-final, and the Notts Outlaws beat Lancashire Lightning by five wickets in the second semi-final. In the final, the Notts Outlaws beat Surrey by six wickets to win the tournament and their second domestic T20 title.

== Background ==
The tournament was scheduled to start on 28 May 2020, and finish on 5 September 2020. However, on 24 April 2020, due to the COVID-19 pandemic, the England and Wales Cricket Board (ECB) confirmed that no professional cricket would be played in England before 1 July 2020. In late May 2020, the ECB looked at the scheduling of domestic cricket for the summer, with the t20 Blast likely to go ahead, including the traditional Final's Day at Edgbaston. The ECB also confirmed that no domestic cricket would be played before 1 August 2020. On 29 June 2020, the ECB confirmed that the county cricket season would begin on 1 August 2020, with the format agreed in early July.

On 7 July 2020, the majority of counties voted to start the tournament on 27 August 2020, with Finals Day taking place at Edgbaston on 3 October 2020.

== Teams ==
The teams were placed into the following groups. The top two teams in each group progressed to the quarter-finals, where they were joined by the two best third-placed teams:

- North Group: Derbyshire Falcons, Durham, Lancashire Lightning, Leicestershire Foxes, Notts Outlaws, Yorkshire Vikings
- Central Group: Birmingham Bears, Glamorgan, Gloucestershire, Northants Steelbacks, Somerset, Worcestershire Rapids
- South Group: Essex Eagles, Hampshire, Kent Spitfires, Middlesex, Surrey, Sussex Sharks

== Results and standings ==
=== North Group ===
Pos	Team	Pld	W	L	T	NR	Pts	NRR
1	Notts Outlaws	10	7	1	0	2	16	1.315
2	Lancashire Lightning	10	5	3	0	2	12	−0.250
3	Leicestershire Foxes	10	4	3	0	3	11	−0.180
4	Durham	10	4	5	0	1	9	0.421
5	Yorkshire Vikings	10	3	5	0	2	8	0.297
6	Derbyshire Falcons	10	1	7	0	2	4	−1.583

Updated to match(es) played on 20 September 2020. Source: BBC Sport, England and Wales Cricket Board

27 August 2020
14:30
Scorecard

Lancashire Lightning; 190/3 (20 overs)	v	Durham; 163/7 (20 overs)
Keaton Jennings 108 (63); Mark Wood 1/24 (4 overs)		Alex Lees 51 (39); Tom Bailey 2/22 (3 overs)

Lancashire Lightning won by 27 runs
Riverside Ground, Chester-le-Street
Umpires: Neil Pratt and Steve O'Shaughnessy
Player of the match: Keaton Jennings (Lancashire Lightning)

- Lancashire Lightning won the toss and elected to bat.
- Tom Hartley (Lancashire Lightning) made his T20 debut.
- Keaton Jennings (Lancashire Lightning) scored his first century in a T20 match.
- Points: Lancashire Lightning 2, Durham 0.

27 August 2020
18:30 (D/N)
Scorecard

Derbyshire Falcons	v	Leicestershire Foxes

Match abandoned without a ball bowled
Grace Road, Leicester
Umpires: Tim Robinson and Hassan Adnan

- No toss.
- No play was possible due to rain.
- Points: Derbyshire Falcons 1, Leicestershire Foxes 1.

27 August 2020
18:35 (D/N)
Scorecard

Yorkshire Vikings	v	Notts Outlaws

Match abandoned without a ball bowled
Headingley Cricket Ground, Leeds
Umpires: Peter Hartley and Neil Mallender

- No toss.
- No play was possible due to rain.
- Points: Yorkshire Vikings 1, Notts Outlaws 1.

29 August 2020
14:00
Scorecard

Durham; 181/3 (20 overs)	v	Notts Outlaws; 185/4 (16.2 overs)
Graham Clark 60 (36); Steven Mullaney 1/30 (4 overs)		Joe Clarke 100* (44); Scott Steel 1/12 (2 overs)

Notts Outlaws won by 6 wickets
Riverside Ground, Chester-le-Street
Umpires: Neil Pratt and Neil Mallender
Player of the match: Joe Clarke (Notts Outlaws)

- Durham won the toss and elected to bat.
- Points: Notts Outlaws 2, Durham 0.

29 August 2020
14:00
Scorecard

Leicestershire Foxes; 150/9 (20 overs)	v	Lancashire Lightning
Harry Dearden 31 (34); Tom Bailey 5/17 (4 overs)

No result
Grace Road, Leicester
Umpires: Rob White and Nick Cook

- Lancashire Lightning won the toss and elected to field.
- Rain prevented any further play.
- Tom Taylor (Leicestershire Foxes) made his T20 debut.
- Tom Bailey (Lancashire Lightning) took his first five-wicket haul in a T20 match.
- Points: Leicestershire Foxes 1, Lancashire Lightning 1.

30 August 2020
14:00
Scorecard

Yorkshire Vikings; 220/5 (20 overs)	v	Derbyshire Falcons; 121/9 (20 overs)
Joe Root 64 (40); Mattie McKiernan 2/22 (3 overs)		Matt Critchley 26 (28); Matthew Fisher 3/21 (4 overs)

Yorkshire Vikings won by 99 runs
Headingley Cricket Ground, Leeds
Umpires: James Middlebrook and Neil Mallender
Player of the match: Adam Lyth (Yorkshire Vikings)

- Yorkshire Vikings won the toss and elected to bat.
- Brooke Guest, Sam Conners (Derbyshire Falcons) and George Hill (Yorkshire Vikings) all made their T20 debuts.
- Points: Yorkshire Vikings 2, Derbyshire Falcons 0.

31 August 2020
13:05
Scorecard

Leicestershire Foxes; 177/6 (20 overs)	v	Durham; 147/8 (20 overs)
Arron Lilley 69 (45); Liam Trevaskis 2/30 (4 overs)		Alex Lees 36 (29); Callum Parkinson 3/21 (4 overs)

Leicestershire Foxes won by 30 runs
Headingley Cricket Ground, Leeds
Umpires: Tim Robinson and James Middlebrook
Player of the match: Arron Lilley (Leicestershire Foxes)

- Leicestershire Foxes won the toss and elected to bat.
- Points: Leicestershire Foxes 2, Durham 0.

31 August 2020
14:00
Scorecard

Yorkshire Vikings; 190 (20 overs)	v	Notts Outlaws; 194/4 (19.2 overs)
Joe Root 65 (43); Luke Fletcher 5/43 (4 overs)		Ben Duckett 86* (53); Jordan Thompson 2/25 (3 overs)

Notts Outlaws won by 6 wickets
Trent Bridge, Nottinghamshire
Umpires: Ian Ramage and Nick Cook
Player of the match: Ben Duckett (Notts Outlaws)

- Yorkshire Vikings won the toss and elected to bat.
- Points: Notts Outlaws 2, Yorkshire Vikings 0.

31 August 2020
18:35 (D/N)
Scorecard

Lancashire Lightning; 178/5 (20 overs)	v	Derbyshire Falcons; 174/7 (20 overs)
Alex Davies 82 (56); Ed Barnes 2/27 (3 overs)		Wayne Madsen 44 (27); Steven Croft 2/29 (4 overs)

Lancashire Lightning won by 4 runs
Headingley Cricket Ground, Leeds
Umpires: Peter Hartley and James Middlebrook
Player of the match: Alex Davies (Lancashire Lightning)

- Lancashire Lightning won the toss and elected to bat.
- Ed Barnes (Derbyshire Falcons) made his T20 debut.
- Points: Lancashire Lightning 2, Derbyshire Falcons 0.

2 September 2020
14:30
Scorecard

Lancashire Lightning	v	Notts Outlaws

Match abandoned without a ball bowled
Aigburth Cricket Ground, Liverpool
Umpires: Hassan Adnan and Steve O'Shaughnessy

- No toss.
- No play was possible due to rain.
- Points: Lancashire Lightning 1, Notts Outlaws 1.

2 September 2020
18:30 (D/N)
Scorecard

Durham	v	Derbyshire Falcons

No result
Riverside Ground, Chester-le-Street
Umpires: Peter Hartley and Neil Pratt

- Derbyshire Falcons won the toss and elected to field.
- No play was possible due to rain.
- Points: Durham 1, Derbyshire Falcons 1.

2 September 2020
18:30 (D/N)
Scorecard

Yorkshire Vikings	v	Leicestershire Foxes

Match abandoned without a ball bowled
Headingley Cricket Ground, Leeds
Umpires: Rob Bailey and Ian Ramage

- No toss.
- No play was possible due to rain.
- Points: Yorkshire Vikings 1, Leicestershire Foxes 1.

4 September 2020
14:30
Scorecard

Derbyshire Falcons; 98/7 (20 overs)	v	Lancashire Lightning; 102/2 (17.2 overs)
Alex Hughes 32 (31); Tom Bailey 2/13 (3 overs)		Keaton Jennings 49* (67); Leus du Plooy 1/17 (1.2 overs)

Lancashire Lightning won by 8 wickets
Aigburth Cricket Ground, Liverpool
Umpires: Graham Lloyd and Steve O'Shaughnessy
Player of the match: Keaton Jennings (Lancashire Lightning)

- Lancashire Lightning won the toss and elected to field.
- Points: Lancashire Lightning 2, Derbyshire Falcons 0.

4 September 2020
18:00 (D/N)
Scorecard

Notts Outlaws; 123/8 (20 overs)	v	Leicestershire Foxes; 124/5 (15 overs)
Gareth Delany 25 (15); Jake Ball 2/17 (4 overs)		Alex Hales 44 (16); Gareth Delany 2/37 (3 overs)

Notts Outlaws won by 5 wickets
Trent Bridge, Nottinghamshire
Umpires: James Middlebrook and Paul Baldwin
Player of the match: Dan Christian (Notts Outlaws)

- Notts Outlaws won the toss and elected to bat.
- Points: Notts Outlaws 2, Leicestershire Foxes 0.

4 September 2020
18:30 (D/N)
Scorecard

Yorkshire Vikings; 198/3 (20 overs)	v	Durham; 169 (19.1 overs)
Tom Kohler-Cadmore 85* (57); Paul Coughlin 2/37 (4 overs)		Graham Clark 68 (39); David Willey 3/26 (3.1 overs)

Yorkshire Vikings won by 29 runs
Riverside Ground, Chester-le-Street
Umpires: Neil Pratt and Neil Mallender
Player of the match: Tom Kohler-Cadmore (Yorkshire Vikings)

- Durham won the toss and elected to field.
- Points: Yorkshire Vikings 2, Durham 0.

11 September 2020
18:00 (D/N)
Scorecard

Lancashire Lightning; 167/5 (20 overs)	v	Notts Outlaws; 169/4 (17 overs)
Steven Croft 37 (38); Samit Patel 2/19 (4 overs)		Joe Clarke 77 (36); Liam Livingstone 2/13 (4 overs)

Notts Outlaws won by 6 wickets
Trent Bridge, Nottinghamshire
Umpires: Neil Mallender and Tim Robinson
Player of the match: Joe Clarke (Notts Outlaws)

- Notts Outlaws won the toss and elected to field.
- Points: Notts Outlaws 2, Lancashire Lightning 0.

11 September 2020
18:30 (D/N)
Scorecard

Durham; 223/2 (20 overs)	v	Derbyshire Falcons; 168/5 (20 overs)
Alex Lees 77* (87); Luis Reece 1/22 (2 overs)		Leus du Plooy 53* (32); Paul Coughlin 2/20 (2 overs)

Durham won by 55 runs
Riverside Ground, Chester-le-Street
Umpires: Peter Hartley and Neil Pratt
Player of the match: Ben Raine (Durham)

- Durham won the toss and elected to bat.
- Points: Durham 2, Derbyshire Falcons 0.

11 September 2020
18:30 (D/N)
Scorecard

Yorkshire Vikings; 188/6 (20 overs)	v	Leicestershire Foxes; 192/7 (20 overs)
Adam Lyth 71 (46); Gareth Delany 2/26 (3 overs)		Gareth Delany 64 (41); Matthew Fisher 3/35 (4 overs)

Leicestershire Foxes won by 3 wickets
Grace Road, Leicester
Umpires: Paul Pollard and Ian Ramage
Player of the match: Gareth Delany (Leicestershire Foxes)

- Leicestershire Foxes won the toss and elected to field.
- Points: Leicestershire Foxes 2, Yorkshire Vikings 0.

13 September 2020
14:00
Scorecard

Notts Outlaws; 198/6 (20 overs)	v	Derbyshire Falcons; 185/6 (20 overs)
Joe Clarke 57 (35); Alex Hughes 2/34 (4 overs)		Wayne Madsen 68 (46); Imad Wasim 2/29 (4 overs)

Notts Outlaws won by 13 runs
Trent Bridge, Nottinghamshire
Umpires: James Middlebrook and Paul Baldwin
Player of the match: Joe Clarke (Notts Outlaws)

- Notts Outlaws won the toss and elected to bat.
- Dustin Melton (Derbyshire Falcons) made his T20 debut.
- Points: Notts Outlaws 2, Derbyshire Falcons 0.

13 September 2020
14:00
Scorecard

Leicestershire Foxes; 130/9 (20 overs)	v	Durham; 132/4 (15.2 overs)
Arron Lilley 45 (31); Matty Potts 3/19 (4 overs)		Ben Raine 50* (34); Ben Mike 2/19 (3 overs)

Durham won by 6 wickets
Riverside Ground, Chester-le-Street
Umpires: Steve O'Shaughnessy and Ian Ramage
Player of the match: Matty Potts (Durham)

- Leicestershire Foxes won the toss and elected to bat.
- Nick Welch (Leicestershire Foxes) made his T20 debut.
- Points: Durham 2, Leicestershire Foxes 0.

14 September 2020
18:30 (D/N)
Scorecard

Yorkshire Vikings; 145/9 (20 overs)	v	Lancashire Lightning; 148/4 (17.5 overs)
Adam Lyth 36 (20); Luke Wood 3/21 (4 overs)		Dane Vilas 44* (36); Ben Coad 1/27 (4 overs)

Lancashire Lightning won by 6 wickets
Headingley Cricket Ground, Leeds
Umpires: James Middlebrook and Neil Mallender
Player of the match: Matt Parkinson (Lancashire Lightning)

- Yorkshire Vikings won the toss and elected to bat.
- James Wharton (Yorkshire Vikings) made his T20 debut.
- Points: Lancashire Lightning 2, Yorkshire Vikings 0.

15 September 2020
18:30 (D/N)
Scorecard

Derbyshire Falcons; 147/8 (20 overs)	v	Leicestershire Foxes; 143/4 (20 overs)
Billy Godleman 34 (36); Gavin Griffiths 4/35 (4 overs)		Harry Dearden 36* (30); Michael Cohen 2/23 (4 overs)

Derbyshire Falcons won by 4 runs
Grace Road, Leicester
Umpires: Hassan Adnan and Nick Cook
Player of the match: Alex Hughes (Derbyshire Falcons)

- Derbyshire Falcons won the toss and elected to bat.
- Points: Derbyshire Falcons 2, Leicestershire Foxes 0.

16 September 2020
18:30 (D/N)
Scorecard

Durham; 147 (19.3 overs)	v	Yorkshire Vikings; 104 (16.4 overs)
Graham Clark 28 (22); Duanne Olivier 2/16 (4 overs)		Will Fraine 28 (21); Matty Potts 3/14 (3 overs)

Durham won by 43 runs
Headingley Cricket Ground, Leeds
Umpires: Peter Hartley and Neil Mallender
Player of the match: Matty Potts (Durham)

- Yorkshire Vikings won the toss and elected to field.
- Points: Durham 2, Yorkshire Vikings 0.

17 September 2020
18:00 (D/N)
Scorecard

Derbyshire Falcons; 142/8 (20 overs)	v	Notts Outlaws; 143/2 (14.1 overs)
Billy Godleman 47 (47); Jake Ball 3/28 (4 overs)		Ben Duckett 57* (31); Dustin Melton 1/17 (1 over)

Notts Outlaws won by 8 wickets
Trent Bridge, Nottinghamshire
Umpires: Tim Robinson and Ian Ramage
Player of the match: Ben Duckett (Notts Outlaws)

- Notts Outlaws won the toss and elected to field.
- Samit Patel played in his 100th consecutive T20 match for the Notts Outlaws.
- Points: Notts Outlaws 2, Derbyshire Falcons 0.

17 September 2020
18:35 (D/N)
Scorecard

Lancashire Lightning; 167/6 (20 overs)	v	Yorkshire Vikings; 160/6 (20 overs)
Liam Livingstone 69 (43); Joe Root 2/25 (4 overs)		Joe Root 64 (39); Danny Lamb 1/15 (2 overs)

Lancashire Lightning won by 7 runs
Old Trafford, Manchester
Umpires: Steve O'Shaughnessy and Peter Hartley
Player of the match: Liam Livingstone (Lancashire Lightning)

- Lancashire Lightning won the toss and elected to bat.
- George Lavelle (Lancashire Lightning), Matt Revis and Sam Wisniewski (Yorkshire Vikings) all made their T20 debuts.
- Points: Lancashire Lightning 2, Yorkshire Vikings 0.

18 September 2020
16:00 (D/N)
Scorecard

Durham; 152/5 (20 overs)	v	Lancashire Lightning; 83 (15 overs)
Alex Lees 67* (60); Luke Wood 2/16 (2 overs)		Danny Lamb 29* (31); Matty Potts 3/8 (3 overs)

Durham won by 74 runs
Old Trafford, Manchester
Umpires: Steve O'Shaughnessy and James Middlebrook
Player of the match: Alex Lees (Durham)

- Durham won the toss and elected to bat.
- Points: Durham 2, Lancashire Lightning 0.

18 September 2020
17:00 (D/N)
Scorecard

Notts Outlaws; 162/7 (20 overs)	v	Leicestershire Foxes; 163/6 (19.5 overs)
Ben Duckett 53 (43); Will Davis 3/38 (4 overs)		Colin Ackermann 67* (53); Steven Mullaney 2/17 (4 overs)

Leicestershire Foxes won by 4 wickets
Grace Road, Leicester
Umpires: Nick Cook and Paul Pollard
Player of the match: Colin Ackermann (Leicestershire Foxes)

- Notts Outlaws won the toss and elected to bat.
- Leicestershire Foxes were awarded five penalty runs following a fake fielding incident in the first over of their innings.
- Points: Leicestershire Foxes 2, Notts Outlaws 0.

20 September 2020
13:00
Scorecard

Derbyshire Falcons; 167/6 (20 overs)	v	Yorkshire Vikings; 171/4 (20 overs)
Thomas Wood 67 (48); Ben Coad 3/40 (4 overs)		Joe Root 60* (50); Sam Conners 2/38 (4 overs)

Yorkshire Vikings won by 6 wickets
Headingley Cricket Ground, Leeds
Umpires: Neil Mallender and Peter Hartley
Player of the match: Joe Root (Yorkshire Vikings)

- Derbyshire Falcons won the toss and elected to bat.
- Ben Birkhead (Yorkshire Vikings) made his T20 debut.
- Points: Yorkshire Vikings 2, Derbyshire Falcons 0.

20 September 2020
13:00
Scorecard

Leicestershire Foxes; 154/5 (20 overs)	v	Lancashire Lightning; 132/5 (20 overs)
Arron Lilley 49 (41); Luke Wood 1/5 (3 overs)		Alex Davies 52 (48); Colin Ackermann 3/18 (4 overs)

Leicestershire Foxes won by 22 runs
Old Trafford, Manchester
Umpires: Steve O'Shaughnessy and James Middlebrook
Player of the match: Colin Ackermann (Leicestershire Foxes)

- Leicestershire Foxes won the toss and elected to bat.
- Points: Leicestershire Foxes 2, Lancashire Lightning 0.

20 September 2020
13:00
Scorecard

Notts Outlaws; 150/6 (20 overs)	v	Durham; 132 (19.1 overs)
Ben Duckett 29 (26); Paul Coughlin 2/24 (2 overs)		Alex Lees 28 (15); Jake Ball 2/7 (2.1 overs)

Notts Outlaws won by 18 runs
Trent Bridge, Nottinghamshire
Umpires: Paul Baldwin and Tim Robinson
Player of the match: Imad Wasim (Notts Outlaws)

- Durham won the toss and elected to field.
- Points: Notts Outlaws 2, Durham 0.

=== Central Group ===
Pos	Team	Pld	W	L	T	NR	Pts	NRR
1	Gloucestershire	10	7	2	0	1	15	1.017
2	Northants Steelbacks	10	5	4	0	1	11	0.053
3	Birmingham Bears	10	5	4	0	1	11	−0.634
4	Somerset	10	4	5	0	1	9	0.653
5	Glamorgan	10	4	5	0	1	9	−0.304
6	Worcestershire Rapids	10	2	7	0	1	5	−0.789

Updated to match(es) played on 20 September 2020. Source: BBC Sport, England and Wales Cricket Board

27 August 2020
14:00
Scorecard

Gloucestershire	v	Northants Steelbacks

Match abandoned without a ball bowled
Bristol County Ground, Bristol
Umpires: Russell Warren and Ian Blackwell

- No toss.
- No play was possible due to rain.
- Points: Gloucestershire 1, Northants Steelbacks 1.

27 August 2020
18:30 (D/N)
Scorecard

Glamorgan	v	Worcestershire Rapids

Match abandoned without a ball bowled
Sophia Gardens, Cardiff
Umpires: Jeff Evans and Jeremy Lloyds

- No toss.
- No play was possible due to rain.
- Points: Glamorgan 1, Worcestershire Rapids 1.

28 August 2020
18:30 (D/N)
Scorecard

Birmingham Bears	v	Somerset

Match abandoned without a ball bowled
Edgbaston Cricket Ground, Birmingham
Umpires: Tom Lungley and Nick Cook

- No toss.
- No play was possible due to rain.
- Points: Birmingham Bears 1, Somerset 1.

29 August 2020
13:00
Scorecard

Worcestershire Rapids; 124/7 (20 overs)	v	Northants Steelbacks; 128/1 (15.1 overs)
Jack Haynes 41 (27); Paul Stirling 2/26 (4 overs)		Paul Stirling 80* (48); Dillon Pennington 1/32 (4 overs)

Northants Steelbacks won by 9 wickets
New Road, Worcester
Umpires: Jeremy Lloyds and Russell Warren
Player of the match: Paul Stirling (Northants Steelbacks)

- Northants Steelbacks won the toss and elected to field.
- Jack Haynes (Worcestershire Rapids) made his T20 debut.
- Points: Northants Steelbacks 2, Worcestershire Rapids 0.

29 August 2020
14:00
Scorecard

Glamorgan; 150/7 (20 overs)	v	Gloucestershire; 135 (20 overs)
Chris Cooke 51* (35); Ryan Higgins 3/29 (4 overs)		Graeme van Buuren 53 (27); Andrew Salter 4/20 (4 overs)

Glamorgan won by 15 runs
Bristol County Ground, Bristol
Umpires: Jeff Evans and Ian Blackwell
Player of the match: Andrew Salter (Glamorgan)

- Gloucestershire won the toss and elected to field.
- Points: Glamorgan 2, Gloucestershire 0.

30 August 2020
14:00
Scorecard

Northants Steelbacks; 171/6 (20 overs)	v	Somerset; 162/8 (20 overs)
Adam Rossington 51 (31); Ollie Sale 2/28 (4 overs)		Roelof van der Merwe 41* (25); Ben Sanderson 3/36 (4 overs)

Northants Steelbacks won by 9 runs
County Cricket Ground, Northampton
Umpires: Rob White and Rob Bailey
Player of the match: Saif Zaib (Northants Steelbacks)

- Somerset won the toss and elected to field.
- George Bartlett (Somerset) made his T20 debut.
- Points: Northants Steelbacks 2, Somerset 0.

30 August 2020
14:00
Scorecard

Glamorgan; 140/9 (20 overs)	v	Birmingham Bears; 141/4 (18.5 overs)
Chris Cooke 72 (56); Tim Bresnan 3/33 (4 overs)		Adam Hose 38 (22); Marchant de Lange 1/19 (3 overs)

Birmingham Bears won by 6 wickets
Sophia Gardens, Cardiff
Umpires: Jeff Evans and Ian Blackwell
Player of the match: Chris Cooke (Glamorgan)

- Glamorgan won the toss and elected to bat.
- Points Birmingham Bears 2, Glamorgan 0.

31 August 2020
13:00
Scorecard

Gloucestershire; 197/3 (20 overs)	v	Worcestershire Rapids; 175/8 (20 overs)
Chris Dent 60 (33); Dillon Pennington 2/27 (3 overs)		Hamish Rutherford 30 (14); David Payne 3/32 (4 overs)

Gloucestershire won by 22 runs
New Road, Worcester
Umpires: Hassan Adnan and Russell Warren
Player of the match: Tom Smith (Gloucestershire)

- Gloucestershire won the toss and elected to bat.
- Points: Gloucestershire 2, Worcestershire Rapids 0.

1 September 2020
18:30 (D/N)
Scorecard

Northants Steelbacks; 158/7 (20 overs)	v	Birmingham Bears; 120 (19.5 overs)
Richard Levi 35 (18); Jake Lintott 2/18 (4 overs)		Henry Brookes 31* (19); Brandon Glover 2/32 (4 overs)

Northants Steelbacks won by 38 runs
County Cricket Ground, Northampton
Umpires: Rob White and Nick Cook
Player of the match: Nathan Buck (Northants Steelbacks)

- Birmingham Bears won the toss and elected to field.
- Vikai Kelley (Birmingham Bears) made his T20 debut.
- Points: Northants Steelbacks 2, Birmingham Bears 0.

1 September 2020
18:30 (D/N)
Scorecard

Glamorgan; 133/8 (20 overs)	v	Somerset; 134/2 (16.1 overs)
Chris Cooke 42 (34); Ben Green 4/26 (4 overs)		Tom Abell 74* (45); Timm van der Gugten 1/15 (2.1 overs)

Somerset won by 8 wickets
County Ground, Taunton
Umpires: Jeremy Lloyds and Ian Blackwell
Player of the match: Ben Green (Somerset)

- Somerset won the toss and elected to field.
- Points: Somerset 2, Glamorgan 0.

2 September 2020
18:35 (D/N)
Scorecard

Gloucestershire; 157/3 (12 overs)	v	Birmingham Bears; 100 (11.1 overs)
Ian Cockbain 84* (35); Dan Mousley 1/9 (1 over)		Ed Pollock 21 (13); Tom Smith 5/16 (3 overs)

Gloucestershire won by 57 runs
Edgbaston Cricket Ground, Birmingham
Umpires: Russell Warren and Paul Baldwin
Player of the match: Ian Cockbain (Gloucestershire)

- Birmingham Bears won the toss and elected to field.
- The match was reduced to 12 overs per side due to rain.
- Dan Mousley (Birmingham Bears) made his T20 debut.
- Points: Gloucestershire 2, Birmingham Bears 0.

3 September 2020
13:05
Scorecard

Somerset; 229/8 (20 overs)	v	Worcestershire Rapids; 213/7 (20 overs)
Steven Davies 60 (35); Daryl Mitchell 3/35 (4 overs)		Jake Libby 75* (46); Josh Davey 4/41 (4 overs)

Somerset won by 16 runs
Edgbaston Cricket Ground, Birmingham
Umpires: Paul Pollard and Nick Cook
Player of the match: Steven Davies (Somerset)

- Worcestershire Rapids won the toss and elected to field.
- Adam Finch (Worcestershire Rapids) made his T20 debut.
- Points: Somerset 2, Worcestershire Rapids 0.

3 September 2020
18:35 (D/N)
Scorecard

Glamorgan; 160/7 (20 overs)	v	Northants Steelbacks; 161/6 (19.2 overs)
Andrew Balbirnie 58 (38); Nathan Buck 4/29 (4 overs)		Alex Wakely 36* (29); Prem Sisodiya 1/29 (4 overs)

Northants Steelbacks won by 4 wickets
Edgbaston Cricket Ground, Birmingham
Umpires: Rob Bailey and Nick Cook
Player of the match: Andrew Balbirnie (Glamorgan)

- Northants Steelbacks won the toss and elected to field.
- Points: Northants Steelbacks 2, Glamorgan 0.

4 September 2020
14:00
Scorecard

Gloucestershire; 181/4 (20 overs)	v	Worcestershire Rapids; 151/9 (20 overs)
Chris Dent 87 (52); Ed Barnard 3/44 (4 overs)		Jake Libby 33 (23); Ryan Higgins 4/34 (4 overs)

Gloucestershire won by 30 runs
Bristol County Ground, Bristol
Umpires: Russell Warren and Jeff Evans
Player of the match: Chris Dent (Gloucestershire)

- Worcestershire Rapids won the toss and elected to field.
- Points: Gloucestershire 2, Worcestershire Rapids 0.

4 September 2020
18:30 (D/N)
Scorecard

Birmingham Bears; 107/4 (12 overs)	v	Somerset; 120/7 (12 overs)
Sam Hain 55* (31); Lewis Gregory 2/18 (2 overs)		Tom Lammonby 43* (20); Olly Stone 2/24 (2 overs)

Birmingham Bears won by 4 runs (DLS method)
County Ground, Taunton
Umpires: Jeremy Lloyds and Ian Blackwell
Player of the match: Sam Hain (Birmingham Bears)

- Somerset won the toss and elected to field.
- Somerset were set a revised target of 125 runs from 12 overs.
- Points: Birmingham Bears 2, Somerset 0.

11 September 2020
14:30
Scorecard

Gloucestershire; 185/6 (20 overs)	v	Northants Steelbacks; 150/6 (20 overs)
Chris Dent 50 (27); Graeme White 3/28 (4 overs)		Paul Stirling 32 (20); Graeme van Buuren 3/15 (4 overs)

Gloucestershire won by 35 runs
County Cricket Ground, Northampton
Umpires: Nick Cook and Rob White
Player of the match: Graeme van Buuren (Gloucestershire)

- Northants Steelbacks won the toss and elected to field.
- Points: Gloucestershire 2, Northants Steelbacks 0.

11 September 2020
18:30 (D/N)
Scorecard

Worcestershire Rapids; 168/4 (20 overs)	v	Somerset; 165/8 (20 overs)
Ben Cox 56* (34); Lewis Gregory 2/31 (4 overs)		Tom Abell 60 (39); Pat Brown 3/39 (4 overs)

Worcestershire Rapids won by 3 runs
County Ground, Taunton
Umpires: Jeremy Lloyds and Ian Blackwell
Player of the match: Ben Cox (Worcestershire Rapids)

- Worcestershire Rapids won the toss and elected to bat.
- Will Smeed (Somerset) made his T20 debut.
- Points: Worcestershire Rapids 2, Somerset 0.

11 September 2020
18:30 (D/N)
Scorecard

Birmingham Bears; 142/9 (20 overs)	v	Glamorgan; 129/8 (20 overs)
Will Rhodes 46 (31); Timm van der Gugten 3/27 (4 overs)		Andrew Balbirnie 30 (29); Jake Lintott 3/11 (4 overs)

Birmingham Bears won by 13 runs
Edgbaston Cricket Ground, Birmingham
Umpires: Russell Warren and Tom Lungley
Player of the match: Jake Lintott (Birmingham Bears)

- Birmingham Bears won the toss and elected to bat.
- Points: Birmingham Bears 2, Glamorgan 0.

13 September 2020
13:00
Scorecard

Worcestershire Rapids; 178/4 (20 overs)	v	Birmingham Bears; 181/4 (19.1 overs)
Jake Libby 63 (40); Olly Stone 3/45 (4 overs)		Sam Hain 73* (44); Ed Barnard 1/24 (3 overs)

Birmingham Bears won by 6 wickets
New Road, Worcester
Umpires: Nick Cook and Paul Pollard
Player of the match: Sam Hain (Birmingham Bears)

- Worcestershire Rapids won the toss and elected to bat.
- Rob Yates (Birmingham Bears) made his T20 debut.
- Points: Birmingham Bears 2, Worcestershire Rapids 0.

13 September 2020
14:00
Scorecard

Northants Steelbacks; 98 (17.2 overs)	v	Glamorgan; 99/3 (16 overs)
Tom Sole 25 (31); Timm van der Gugten 3/17 (3 overs)		David Lloyd 40 (29); Gareth Berg 1/8 (2 overs)

Glamorgan won by 7 wickets
Sophia Gardens, Cardiff
Umpires: Jeff Evans and Russell Warren
Player of the match: David Lloyd (Glamorgan)

- Northants Steelbacks won the toss and elected to bat.
- Points: Glamorgan 2, Northants Steelbacks 0.

13 September 2020
14:00
Scorecard

Gloucestershire; 203/6 (20 overs)	v	Somerset; 192/8 (20 overs)
Ian Cockbain 50 (27); Max Waller 3/18 (4 overs)		Will Smeed 82 (49); Ryan Higgins 3/47 (4 overs)

Gloucestershire won by 11 runs
County Ground, Taunton
Umpires: Jeremy Lloyds and Ian Blackwell
Player of the match: Will Smeed (Somerset)

- Somerset won the toss and elected to field.
- Points: Gloucestershire 2, Somerset 0.

15 September 2020
14:00
Scorecard

Gloucestershire; 173/6 (20 overs)	v	Birmingham Bears; 123 (17.1 overs)
Miles Hammond 49 (41); Olly Stone 2/31 (4 overs)		Sam Hain 43* (34); Matthew Taylor 3/29 (4 overs)

Gloucestershire won by 50 runs
Bristol County Ground, Bristol
Umpires: Jeremy Lloyds and Ian Blackwell
Player of the match: Ian Cockbain (Gloucestershire)

- Gloucestershire won the toss and elected to bat.
- Points: Gloucestershire 2, Birmingham Bears 0.

15 September 2020
18:30 (D/N)
Scorecard

Worcestershire Rapids; 178/6 (20 overs)	v	Northants Steelbacks; 170/7 (20 overs)
Hamish Rutherford 62 (37); Ben Sanderson 2/26 (4 overs)		Richard Levi 50 (29); Ed Barnard 2/15 (4 overs)

Worcestershire Rapids won by 8 runs
County Cricket Ground, Northampton
Umpires: Rob White and Rob Bailey
Player of the match: Ed Barnard (Worcestershire Rapids)

- Worcestershire Rapids won the toss and elected to bat.
- Points: Worcestershire Rapids 2, Northants Steelbacks 0.

16 September 2020
18:30 (D/N)
Scorecard

Somerset; 183/3 (20 overs)	v	Glamorgan; 117 (15.5 overs)
Babar Azam 114* (62); Prem Sisodiya 1/26 (4 overs)		Owen Morgan 24 (13); Craig Overton 3/36 (2.5 overs)

Somerset won by 66 runs
Sophia Gardens, Cardiff
Umpires: Jeff Evans and Jeremy Lloyds
Player of the match: Babar Azam (Somerset)

- Glamorgan won the toss and elected to field.
- Lewis Goldsworthy (Somerset) made his T20 debut.
- Babar Azam (Somerset) scored his 5,000th run in T20s.
- Points: Somerset 2, Glamorgan 0.

18 September 2020
17:00 (D/N)
Scorecard

Northants Steelbacks; 140/9 (20 overs)	v	Somerset; 146/3 (18 overs)
Josh Cobb 49 (41); Lewis Goldsworthy 2/21 (3 overs)		Steven Davies 45 (38); Luke Procter 1/11 (1 over)

Somerset won by 7 wickets
County Ground, Taunton
Umpires: Ian Blackwell and Russell Warren
Player of the match: Tom Lammonby (Somerset)

- Northants Steelbacks won the toss and elected to bat.
- Points: Somerset 2, Northants Steelbacks 0.

18 September 2020
18:30 (D/N)
Scorecard

Birmingham Bears; 179/6 (20 overs)	v	Worcestershire Rapids; 163/8 (20 overs)
Sam Hain 61 (33); Ed Barnard 2/20 (4 overs)		Brett D'Oliveira 61 (40); Ethan Brookes 2/24 (4 overs)

Birmingham Bears won by 16 runs
Edgbaston Cricket Ground, Birmingham
Umpires: Paul Baldwin and Chris Watts
Player of the match: Sam Hain (Birmingham Bears)

- Birmingham Bears won the toss and elected to bat.
- Points: Birmingham Bears 2, Worcestershire Rapids 0.

18 September 2020
18:30 (D/N)
Scorecard

Glamorgan; 188/4 (20 overs)	v	Gloucestershire; 171/6 (20 overs)
Andrew Balbirnie 99* (54); Tom Smith 1/26 (4 overs)		Chris Dent 55 (36); Graham Wagg 3/34 (4 overs)

Glamorgan won by 17 runs
Sophia Gardens, Cardiff
Umpires: Jeff Evans and Jeremy Lloyds
Player of the match: Andrew Balbirnie (Glamorgan)

- Glamorgan won the toss and elected to bat.
- Points: Glamorgan 2, Gloucestershire 0.

20 September 2020
13:00
Scorecard

Somerset; 161/7 (20 overs)	v	Gloucestershire; 163/8 (20 overs)
Lewis Gregory 50 (28); Tom Smith 2/25 (4 overs)		Ian Cockbain 89 (57); Josh Davey 3/24 (3 overs)

Gloucestershire won by 2 wickets
Bristol County Ground, Bristol
Umpires: Jeff Evans and Alex Wharf
Player of the match: Ian Cockbain (Gloucestershire)

- Somerset won the toss and elected to bat.
- Points: Gloucestershire 2, Somerset 0.

20 September 2020
13:00
Scorecard

Birmingham Bears; 191/5 (20 overs)	v	Northants Steelbacks; 193/7 (18.5 overs)
Adam Hose 119 (64); Ben Sanderson 2/26 (4 overs)		Tom Taylor 50* (27); Tim Bresnan 3/25 (3.5 overs)

Northants Steelbacks won by 3 wickets
Edgbaston Cricket Ground, Birmingham
Umpires: Jeremy Lloyds and Paul Pollard
Player of the match: Graeme White (Northants Steelbacks)

- Birmingham Bears won the toss and elected to bat.
- Adam Hose (Birmingham Bears) scored his maiden century in T20s.
- Points: Northants Steelbacks 2, Birmingham Bears 0.

20 September 2020
13:00
Scorecard

Worcestershire Rapids; 190/3 (20 overs)	v	Glamorgan; 196/4 (19.4 overs)
Hamish Rutherford 100 (62); Timm van der Gugten 3/28 (4 overs)		Nick Selman 78 (53); Pat Brown 2/63 (3.4 overs)

Glamorgan won by 6 wickets
New Road, Worcester
Umpires: Ian Blackwell and Ian Ramage
Player of the match: Hamish Rutherford (Worcestershire Rapids)

- Worcestershire Rapids won the toss and elected to bat.
- Points: Glamorgan 2, Worcestershire Rapids 0.

=== South Group ===
Pos	Team	Pld	W	L	T	NR	Pts	NRR
1	Surrey	10	7	1	1	1	16	0.651
2	Sussex Sharks	10	6	3	0	1	13	0.377
3	Kent Spitfires	10	5	3	1	1	12	0.108
4	Middlesex	10	3	5	1	1	8	−0.296
5	Essex Eagles	10	2	6	1	1	6	−0.003
6	Hampshire	10	2	7	0	1	5	−0.803

Updated to match(es) played on 20 September 2020. Source: BBC Sport, England and Wales Cricket Board

27 August 2020
14:00
Scorecard

Hampshire; 139/6 (20 overs)	v	Kent Spitfires; 52/0 (4.1 overs)
Joe Weatherley 68 (49); Matt Milnes 3/20 (4 overs)		Daniel Bell-Drummond 28* (16)

No result
St Lawrence Ground, Canterbury
Umpires: Mark Newell and Nigel Llong

- Kent Spitfires won the toss and elected to field.
- Rain during Kent Spitfires' innings prevented any further play.
- Scott Currie (Hampshire) made his T20 debut.
- Points: Hampshire 1, Kent Spitfires 1.

27 August 2020
14:00
Scorecard

Middlesex; 184/5 (20 overs)	v	Essex Eagles; 10/0 (1.3 overs)
Max Holden 102* (60); Matt Quinn 2/24 (4 overs)		Cameron Delport 8* (4)

No result
County Cricket Ground, Chelmsford
Umpires: Neil Bainton and Chris Watts

- Essex Eagles won the toss and elected to field.
- Rain during Essex Eagles' innings prevented any further play.
- Max Holden (Middlesex) scored his first century in a T20 match.
- Points: Essex Eagles 1, Middlesex 1.

28 August 2020
14:00
Scorecard

Sussex Sharks; 116/5 (15.2 overs)	v	Surrey
Phil Salt 40 (22); Gareth Batty 2/17 (3 overs)

No result
County Cricket Ground, Hove
Umpires: Billy Taylor and Ian Gould

- Surrey won the toss and elected to field.
- Rain during Sussex Sharks' innings prevented any further play.
- Gus Atkinson, Dan Moriarty and James Taylor (Surrey) all made their T20 debuts.
- Points: Sussex Sharks 1, Surrey 1.

29 August 2020
14:00
Scorecard

Middlesex; 209/4 (20 overs)	v	Kent Spitfires; 209/5 (20 overs)
Stephen Eskinazi 84 (52); Fred Klaassen 2/50 (4 overs)		Daniel Bell-Drummond 72 (32); Steven Finn 2/34 (4 overs)

Match tied
Lord's, London
Umpires: Neil Bainton and Ben Debenham
Player of the match: Daniel Bell-Drummond (Kent Spitfires)

- Kent Spitfires won the toss and elected to field.
- Points: Middlesex 1, Kent Spitfires 1.

30 August 2020
14:00
Scorecard

Hampshire; 176/5 (20 overs)	v	Sussex Sharks; 177/4 (19.5 overs)
James Fuller 53* (31); Danny Briggs 3/17 (4 overs)		Luke Wright 82 (55); Mason Crane 1/20 (4 overs)

Sussex Sharks won by 6 wickets
County Cricket Ground, Hove
Umpires: Billy Taylor and Mark Newell
Player of the match: Luke Wright (Sussex Sharks)

- Sussex Sharks won the toss and elected to field.
- Points: Sussex Sharks 2, Hampshire 0.

30 August 2020
14:00
Scorecard

Essex Eagles; 143/6 (20 overs)	v	Surrey; 143/8 (20 overs)
Ryan ten Doeschate 35 (32); Scott Borthwick 2/34 (4 overs)		Ben Foakes 44 (37); Paul Walter 2/13 (2 overs)

Match tied
The Oval, London
Umpires: Ben Debenham and Ian Gould
Player of the match: Ben Foakes (Surrey)

- Surrey won the toss and elected to field.
- Points: Essex Eagles 1, Surrey 1.

1 September 2020
14:00
Scorecard

Surrey; 161/4 (20 overs)	v	Kent Spitfires; 162/5 (18.3 overs)
Hashim Amla 75 (56); Tim Groenewald 2/31 (4 overs)		Heino Kuhn 42* (31); Dan Moriarty 3/25 (4 overs)

Kent Spitfires won by 5 wickets
St Lawrence Ground, Canterbury
Umpires: Mark Newell and Nigel Llong
Player of the match: Heino Kuhn (Kent Spitfires)

- Kent Spitfires won the toss and elected to field.
- Points: Kent Spitfires 2, Surrey 0.

1 September 2020
14:00
Scorecard

Essex Eagles; 139/6 (20 overs)	v	Hampshire; 140/5 (19.5 overs)
Ryan ten Doeschate 37* (29); Mason Crane 3/18 (4 overs)		George Munsey 32 (32); Aron Nijjar 2/25 (4 overs)

Hampshire won by 5 wickets
County Cricket Ground, Chelmsford
Umpires: Neil Bainton and Chris Watts
Player of the match: Mason Crane (Hampshire)

- Hampshire won the toss and elected to field.
- Points: Hampshire 2, Essex Eagles 0.

1 September 2020
18:15 (D/N)
Scorecard

Middlesex; 165/5 (20 overs)	v	Sussex Sharks; 168/7 (19.2 overs)
Stephen Eskinazi 79 (48); Danny Briggs 2/21 (4 overs)		David Wiese 79* (46); Tom Helm 2/17 (3.2 overs)

Sussex Sharks won by 3 wickets
Lord's, London
Umpires: Billy Taylor and Ben Debenham
Player of the match: David Wiese (Sussex Sharks)

- Sussex Sharks won the toss and elected to field.
- Luke Hollman (Middlesex) made his T20 debut.
- Points: Sussex Sharks 2, Middlesex 0.

3 September 2020
14:00
Scorecard

Kent Spitfires; 195/5 (20 overs)	v	Sussex Sharks; 194/7 (20 overs)
Zak Crawley 67 (49); George Garton 2/31 (4 overs)		Luke Wright 40 (20); Imran Qayyum 2/27 (4 overs)

Kent Spitfires won by 1 run
County Cricket Ground, Hove
Umpires: Mark Newell and Billy Taylor
Player of the match: Zak Crawley (Kent Spitfires)

- Sussex Sharks won the toss and elected to field.
- Points: Kent Spitfires 2, Sussex Sharks 0.

3 September 2020
18:15 (D/N)
Scorecard

Middlesex; 167/7 (20 overs)	v	Essex Eagles; 156/8 (20 overs)
Stephen Eskinazi 51 (38); Simon Harmer 2/23 (4 overs)		Ryan ten Doeschate 32 (25); Steven Finn 3/18 (4 overs)

Middlesex won by 11 runs
Lord's, London
Umpires: Neil Bainton and Ian Gould
Player of the match: Steven Finn (Middlesex)

- Essex Eagles won the toss and elected to field.
- Points: Middlesex 2, Essex Eagles 0.

3 September 2020
18:30 (D/N)
Scorecard

Hampshire; 77/5 (11 overs)	v	Surrey; 81/1 (10.4 overs)
Sam Northeast 31 (31); Dan Moriarty 2/12 (3 overs)		Will Jacks 45* (31); Mason Crane 1/13 (2 overs)

Surrey won by 9 wickets (DLS method)
The Oval, London
Umpires: Nigel Llong and Ben Debenham
Player of the match: Will Jacks (Surrey)

- Surrey won the toss and elected to field.
- Surrey were set a revised target of 80 runs from 11 overs.
- Felix Organ (Hampshire) made his T20 debut.
- Points: Surrey 2, Hampshire 0.

5 September 2020
13:05
Scorecard

Kent Spitfires; 192/6 (20 overs)	v	Essex Eagles; 163/7 (20 overs)
Daniel Bell-Drummond 81 (45); Simon Harmer 2/21 (4 overs)		Ryan ten Doeschate 42 (24); Imran Qayyum 3/25 (4 overs)

Kent Spitfires won by 29 runs
The Oval, London
Umpires: Ian Gould and Ben Debenham
Player of the match: Daniel Bell-Drummond (Kent Spitfires)

- Kent Spitfire won the toss and elected to bat.
- Points: Kent Spitfires 2, Essex Eagles 0.

5 September 2020
18:35 (D/N)
Scorecard

Middlesex; 113/9 (20 overs)	v	Surrey; 116/4 (18.1 overs)
Max Holden 29 (29); Gareth Batty 3/18 (4 overs)		Ben Foakes 60* (50); Nathan Sowter 2/16 (4 overs)

Surrey won by 6 wickets
The Oval, London
Umpires: Ian Gould and Neil Bainton
Player of the match: Ben Foakes (Surrey)

- Middlesex won the toss and elected to bat.
- Jack Davies (Middlesex) made his T20 debut.
- Points: Surrey 2, Middlesex 0.

10 September 2020
18:35 (D/N)
Scorecard

Sussex Sharks; 159/5 (20 overs)	v	Hampshire; 146/6 (20 overs)
Luke Wright 83 (59); Chris Wood 2/29 (4 overs)		Tom Alsop 43 (37); Danny Briggs 2/20 (4 overs)

Sussex Sharks won by 13 runs
Rose Bowl, Southampton
Umpires: Billy Taylor and Ian Gould
Player of the match: Luke Wright (Sussex Sharks)

- Hampshire won the toss and elected to field.
- Calvin Harrison (Hampshire) made his T20 debut.
- Points: Sussex Sharks 2, Hampshire 0.

11 September 2020
18:35 (D/N)
Scorecard

Essex Eagles; 195/8 (20 overs)	v	Surrey; 198/6 (20 overs)
Cameron Delport 64 (32); Dan Moriarty 3/38 (4 overs)		Laurie Evans 88* (52); Aaron Beard 3/41 (3 overs)

Surrey won by 4 wickets
County Cricket Ground, Chelmsford
Umpires: Ben Debenham and Nigel Llong
Player of the match: Laurie Evans (Surrey)

- Essex Eagles won the toss and elected to bat.
- Jack Plom (Essex Eagles) made his T20 debut.
- Points: Surrey 2, Essex Eagles 0.

12 September 2020
14:00
Scorecard

Kent Spitfires; 141/8 (20 overs)	v	Sussex Sharks; 145/2 (15.4 overs)
Joe Denly 32 (17); Danny Briggs 3/27 (4 overs)		Delray Rawlins 62* (33); Joe Denly 1/19 (3 overs)

Sussex Sharks won by 8 wickets
St Lawrence Ground, Canterbury
Umpires: Ian Gould and Nigel Llong
Player of the match: Delray Rawlins (Sussex Sharks)

- Sussex Sharks won the toss and elected to field.
- Points: Sussex Sharks 2, Kent Spitfires 0.

12 September 2020
14:00
Scorecard

Middlesex; 142/6 (20 overs)	v	Hampshire; 123 (18.5 overs)
Stephen Eskinazi 33 (28); Mason Crane 2/20 (4 overs)		Tom Alsop 43 (41); Steven Finn 3/27 (4 overs)

Middlesex won by 19 runs
Lord's, London
Umpires: Billy Taylor and Rob Bailey
Player of the match: Tom Helm (Middlesex)

- Middlesex won the toss and elected to bat.
- Points: Middlesex 2, Hampshire 0.

14 September 2020
14:00
Scorecard

Essex Eagles; 197/5 (20 overs)	v	Sussex Sharks; 185/8 (20 overs)
Dan Lawrence 81 (44); Delray Rawlins 2/18 (3 overs)		Aaron Thomason 47 (36); Dan Lawrence 2/3 (1 over)

Essex Eagles won by 12 runs
County Cricket Ground, Hove
Umpires: Neil Bainton and Ian Gould
Player of the match: Dan Lawrence (Essex Eagles)

- Sussex Sharks won the toss and elected to field.
- Points: Essex Eagles 2, Sussex Sharks 0.

14 September 2020
14:00
Scorecard

Hampshire; 182/6 (20 overs)	v	Kent Spitfires; 183/2 (17.1 overs)
James Fuller 50* (23); Fred Klaassen 1/24 (3 overs)		Zak Crawley 108* (54); Ian Holland 1/27 (2.1 overs)

Kent Spitfires won by 8 wickets
Rose Bowl, Southampton
Umpires: Billy Taylor and Mark Newell
Player of the match: Zak Crawley (Kent Spitfires)

- Kent Spitfires won the toss and elected to field.
- Points: Kent Spitfires 2, Hampshire 0.

14 September 2020
18:15 (D/N)
Scorecard

Surrey; 218/5 (20 overs)	v	Middlesex; 188/5 (20 overs)
Hashim Amla 67 (49); Tom Helm 2/44 (4 overs)		Stephen Eskinazi 77 (44); Dan Moriarty 2/34 (4 overs)

Surrey won by 30 runs
Lord's, London
Umpires: Rob Bailey and Ben Debenham
Player of the match: Will Jacks (Surrey)

- Middlesex won the toss and elected to field.
- Points Surrey 2, Middlesex 0.
- Surrey's score of 218 was a record high total for a T20 match at Lord's

16 September 2020
14:00
Scorecard

Essex Eagles; 168/3 (20 overs)	v	Hampshire; 114/9 (20 overs)
Tom Westley 51 (37); Mason Crane 1/27 (4 overs)		Chris Wood 18 (30); Aron Nijjar 3/22 (4 overs)

Essex Eagles won by 54 runs
Rose Bowl, Southampton
Umpires: Billy Taylor and Ben Debenham
Player of the match: Aron Nijjar (Essex Eagles)

- Essex Eagles won the toss and elected to bat.
- Points: Essex Eagles 2, Hampshire 0.

16 September 2020
14:00
Scorecard

Middlesex; 184/6 (20 overs)	v	Kent Spitfires; 182/7 (20 overs)
Joe Cracknell 50 (22); Imran Qayyum 1/21 (4 overs)		Daniel Bell-Drummond 89 (54); Tim Murtagh 2/23 (4 overs)

Middlesex won by 2 runs
St Lawrence Ground, Canterbury
Umpires: Nigel Llong and Neil Bainton
Player of the match: Luke Hollman (Middlesex)

- Kent Spitfires won the toss and elected to field.
- Points: Middlesex 2, Kent Spitfires 0.

16 September 2020
18:30 (D/N)
Scorecard

Sussex Sharks; 165/7 (20 overs)	v	Surrey; 167/6 (19.1 overs)
Luke Wright 45 (37); Will Jacks 2/29 (3 overs)		Will Jacks 63 (39); Will Beer 3/34 (4 overs)

Surrey won by 4 wickets
The Oval, London
Umpires: Ian Gould and Chris Watts
Player of the match: Will Jacks (Surrey)

- Surrey won the toss and elected to field.
- Points: Surrey 2, Sussex Sharks 0.

18 September 2020
14:00
Scorecard

Essex Eagles; 167/9 (20 overs)	v	Kent Spitfires; 171/6 (19.4 overs)
Ryan ten Doeschate 52 (33); Fred Klaassen 3/36 (4 overs)		Jack Leaning 55* (32); Jack Plom 3/32 (3.4 overs)

Kent Spitfires won by 4 wickets
St Lawrence Ground, Canterbury
Umpires: Martin Saggers and Nigel Llong
Player of the match: Jack Leaning (Kent Spitfires)

- Essex Eagles won the toss and elected to bat.
- Points: Kent Spitfires 2, Essex Eagles 0.

18 September 2020
14:00
Scorecard

Hampshire; 138/8 (20 overs)	v	Surrey; 143/1 (15.2 overs)
Ian Holland 65 (51); Reece Topley 4/20 (4 overs)		Laurie Evans 81* (46); Felix Organ 1/26 (3 overs)

Surrey won by 9 wickets
Rose Bowl, Southampton
Umpires: Billy Taylor and Rob Bailey
Player of the match: Laurie Evans (Surrey)

- Surrey won the toss and elected to field.
- Points: Surrey 2, Hampshire 0.

18 September 2020
14:00
Scorecard

Middlesex; 155/8 (20 overs)	v	Sussex Sharks; 158/7 (19.2 overs)
John Simpson 46 (30); George Garton 4/27 (4 overs)		Phil Salt 56 (40); Luke Hollman 3/18 (4 overs)

Sussex Sharks won by 3 wickets
County Cricket Ground, Hove
Umpires: Ian Gould and Rob White
Player of the match: Luke Hollman (Middlesex)

- Sussex Sharks won the toss and elected to field.
- Points: Sussex Sharks 2, Middlesex 0.

20 September 2020
13:00
Scorecard

Essex Eagles; 136/9 (20 overs)	v	Sussex Sharks; 137/6 (18.2 overs)
Paul Walter 76 (45); George Garton 4/21 (4 overs)		Phil Salt 42 (22); Shane Snater 2/22 (3 overs)

Sussex Sharks won by 4 wickets
County Cricket Ground, Chelmsford
Umpires: Rob Bailey and Ben Debenham
Player of the match: George Garton (Sussex Sharks)

- Sussex Sharks won the toss and elected to field.
- Ben Allison, Robin Das and Feroze Khushi (Essex Eagles) all made their T20 debuts.
- Points: Sussex Sharks 2, Essex Sharks 0.

20 September 2020
13:00
Scorecard

Hampshire; 141/9 (20 overs)	v	Middlesex; 121 (18 overs)
Sam Northeast 31 (28); Thilan Walallawita 3/19 (4 overs)		John Simpson 48 (40); Shaheen Afridi 6/19 (4 overs)

Hampshire won by 20 runs
Rose Bowl, Southampton
Umpires: Martin Saggers and Billy Taylor
Player of the match: Shaheen Afridi (Hampshire)

- Hampshire won the toss and elected to bat.
- Thilan Walallawita (Middlesex) made his T20 debut.
- Shaheen Afridi (Hampshire) took a hat-trick and four wickets in four balls.
- Points: Hampshire 2, Middlesex 0.

20 September 2020
13:00
Scorecard

Kent Spitfires; 159/8 (20 overs)	v	Surrey; 161/4 (18.4 overs)
Sam Billings 50 (33); Liam Plunkett 3/19 (4 overs)		Laurie Evans 73 (45); Grant Stewart 2/28 (3.4 overs)

Surrey won by 6 wickets
The Oval, London
Umpires: Ian Gould and Nigel Llong
Player of the match: Laurie Evans (Surrey)

- Surrey won the toss and elected to field.
- Points: Surrey 2, Kent Spitfires 0.

== Knock-out stage ==
Quarter-finals
S1	Surrey	169/2
S3	Kent Spitfires	113/7
C1	Gloucestershire	114/3
C2	Northants Steelbacks	113
S2	Sussex Sharks	95
N2	Lancashire Lightning	140/8
N1	Notts Outlaws	139/7
N3	Leicestershire Foxes	139/7

Semi-finals
S1	Surrey	74/4
C1	Gloucestershire	73/7
N2	Lancashire Lightning	94/4
N1	Notts Outlaws	95/5

Final
S1	Surrey	127/7
N1	Notts Outlaws	129/4

=== Quarter-finals ===
1 October 2020
13:00
Scorecard

Surrey; 169/2 (20 overs)	v	Kent Spitfires; 113/7 (20 overs)
Hashim Amla 73* (53); Imran Qayyum 2/34 (4 overs)		Jack Leaning 34 (28); Will Jacks 4/15 (4 overs)

Surrey won by 56 runs
The Oval, London
Umpires: Nick Cook and Martin Saggers
Player of the match: Will Jacks (Surrey)

- Kent Spitfires won the toss and elected to field.

1 October 2020
13:00
Scorecard

Lancashire Lightning; 140/8 (20 overs)	v	Sussex Sharks; 95 (17.2 overs)
Steven Croft 41 (37); George Garton 3/24 (4 overs)		Luke Wright 36 (35); Liam Livingstone 4/23 (3.2 overs)

Lancashire Lightning won by 45 runs
County Cricket Ground, Hove
Umpires: Ian Gould and Nigel Llong
Player of the match: Liam Livingstone (Lancashire Lightning)

- Sussex Sharks won the toss and elected to field.

1 October 2020
14:00
Scorecard

Northants Steelbacks; 113 (19.4 overs)	v	Gloucestershire; 114/3 (11.5 overs)
Tom Taylor 27 (15); Benny Howell 3/16 (4 overs)		Chris Dent 40 (25); Graeme White 2/43 (3.5 overs)

Gloucestershire won by 7 wickets
Bristol County Ground, Bristol
Umpires: Alex Wharf and Russell Warren
Player of the match: Benny Howell (Gloucestershire)

- Northants Steelbacks won the toss and elected to bat.

1 October 2020
18:00 (D/N)
Scorecard

Leicestershire Foxes; 139/7 (20 overs)	v	Notts Outlaws; 139/7 (20 overs)
Harry Swindells 58 (43); Dan Christian 2/24 (4 overs)		Joe Clarke 35 (22); Gavin Griffiths 3/21 (4 overs)

Match tied
Trent Bridge, Nottinghamshire
Umpires: Tim Robinson and Neil Mallender
Player of the match: Samit Patel (Notts Outlaws)

- Notts Outlaws won the toss and elected to field.
- Notts Outlaws progressed to the semi-finals on account of scoring more runs in the powerplay.

== Finals Day ==
=== Semi-finals ===
4 October 2020
11:00
Scorecard

Gloucestershire; 73/7 (11 overs)	v	Surrey; 74/4 (9.4 overs)
Ryan Higgins 19 (14); Liam Plunkett 3/12 (2 overs)		Ben Foakes 20 (20); David Payne 3/18 (2.4 overs)

Surrey won by 6 wickets
Edgbaston Cricket Ground, Birmingham
Umpires: Mike Burns and Alex Wharf
Player of the match: Liam Plunkett (Surrey)

- Surrey won the toss and elected to field.
- The match was reduced to 11 overs per side due to rain.

4 October 2020
14:30
Scorecard

Lancashire Lightning; 94/4 (11 overs)	v	Notts Outlaws; 95/5 (8.2 overs)
Steven Croft 33 (22); Matt Carter 2/16 (2 overs)		Dan Christian 30 (13); Matt Parkinson 2/12 (2.2 overs)

Notts Outlaws won by 5 wickets
Edgbaston Cricket Ground, Birmingham
Umpires: David Millns and Martin Saggers
Player of the match: Dan Christian (Notts Outlaws)

- Lancashire Lightning won the toss and elected to bat.
- The match was reduced to 11 overs per side due to rain.

=== Final ===
4 October 2020
18:45 (D/N)
Scorecard

Surrey; 127/7 (16 overs)	v	Notts Outlaws; 129/4 (13.2 overs)
Jason Roy 66 (47); Dan Christian 4/23 (3 overs)		Ben Duckett 53* (38); Will Jacks 2/32 (3 overs)

Notts Outlaws won by 6 wickets
Edgbaston Cricket Ground, Birmingham
Umpires: Mike Burns and David Millns
Player of the match: Dan Christian (Notts Outlaws)

- Notts Outlaws won the toss and elected to field.
- The match was reduced to 16 overs per side due to rain.
