= 2020 Bob Willis Trophy =

2020 cricket tournament

- Tournament logo
- Administrator: England and Wales Cricket Board
- Cricket format: First-class cricket (4 days)
- Tournament format: League system
- Champions: Essex (1st title)
- Runners-up: Somerset
- Participants: 18
- Matches: 46
- Most runs: Alastair Cook (563)
- Most wickets: Simon Harmer (38)

The 2020 Bob Willis Trophy was a first-class cricket tournament during the 2020 English cricket season, and the inaugural edition of the Bob Willis Trophy. It replaced the County Championship, not held due to the COVID-19 pandemic. The eighteen county cricket teams were split into three regional groups of six, with the two group winners with the most points advancing to a final held at Lord's. The maximum number of overs bowled in a day was reduced from 96 to 90, and the team's first innings could be no longer than 120 overs.

After a pandemic-induced delay, the counties voted for the Trophy to begin on 1 August 2020, with the final starting on 23 September 2020.

In the final round of matches, the game between Gloucestershire and Northamptonshire was abandoned at lunch on the first day, after a member of the Northamptonshire squad provided a positive test for COVID-19. The match was recorded as a draw, with Northamptonshire taking ten points, and Gloucestershire eight. Neither side were in contention to reach the final of the tournament.

Essex became the first team to qualify for the final, after they beat Middlesex by nine wickets in their final match, and Derbyshire failed to gain a batting point in their match against Lancashire. Somerset advanced after they beat Worcestershire by 60 runs in their fifth match. The final was drawn, with Essex winning the Trophy on a first-innings lead.

In October 2020, Sussex were deducted 24 points after bowler Mitchell Claydon was found guilty of a ball tampering offence. Claydon was adjudged to have applied hand sanitiser to the ball during a game against Middlesex in August. The player also received a nine-game ban.

While the Trophy was promoted as a one-off competition, the structure of three groups of six was retained for the 2021 County Championship.

== Background ==
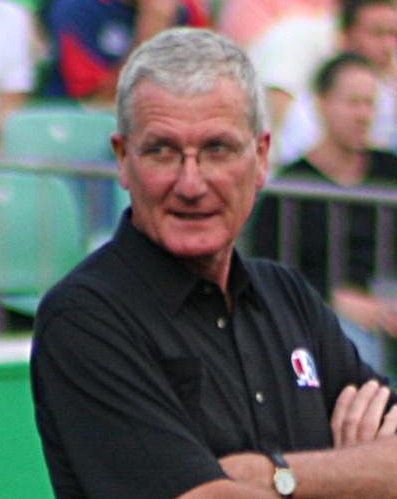
The competition was named after former England bowler Bob Willis.

The first round of matches in the County Championship were originally scheduled to start on 12 April, with the final round of matches finishing on 25 September. However, in March 2020, due to the COVID-19 pandemic, the England and Wales Cricket Board (ECB) announced that the season would be delayed until at least 28 May 2020. The following month, Abu Dhabi Cricket (ADC) suggested using facilities in the United Arab Emirates between October and January as a possible solution to playing some fixtures. On 24 April 2020, the ECB confirmed that no professional cricket would be played in England before 1 July 2020. As a result of the pandemic, the vast majority of clubs placed players and staff on furlough.

In late May 2020, the ECB looked at the idea of starting the County Championship in August, split into three groups of six teams, with a final at Lord's. The ECB also confirmed that no domestic cricket would be played before 1 August 2020. In June 2020, some clubs raised concerns about the logistics of travelling and the financial viability of playing first-class cricket, with 50-over matches being a more realistic possibility. On 29 June 2020, the ECB confirmed that the domestic cricket season would begin on 1 August 2020, with the format to be agreed in early July. On 7 July 2020, the majority of counties voted to start the season on 1 August 2020.

On 26 July 2020, a crowd of 1,000 spectators were allowed to watch a test event at The Oval in London, the first time people had been to see a live cricket match since the start of the pandemic. Following the success of the trial, a pilot scheme would have allowed up to 2,500 fans to attend the first two days of play of Surrey and Warwickshire's first matches. However, on 31 July 2020 Prime Minister Boris Johnson announced crowds would not be allowed to attend sporting events following an increase in COVID-19 infection rates.

== Teams ==
The teams were placed into the following groups:

- North Group: Derbyshire, Durham, Lancashire, Leicestershire, Nottinghamshire, Yorkshire
- Central Group: Glamorgan, Gloucestershire, Northamptonshire, Somerset, Warwickshire, Worcestershire
- South Group: Essex, Hampshire, Kent, Middlesex, Surrey, Sussex

== Fixtures ==
The fixtures for the tournament were announced on 24 July 2020. Following local COVID-19 lockdown restrictions in Leicester, Leicestershire County Cricket Club's first home fixture was moved to a neutral venue.

=== North Group ===
1–4 August 2020
Scorecard

| Nottinghamshire | v | Derbyshire |
| 324 (77.2 overs); Haseeb Hameed 68 (143); Michael Cohen 3/47 (9 overs) | | 239 (71 overs); Leus du Plooy 130 (177); Joey Evison 3/38 (11 overs) |
| 279 (83.2 overs); Samit Patel 80 (94); Ben Aitchison 3/55 (23 overs) | | 363/7 (120.4 overs); Fynn Hudson-Prentice 91* (169); Jake Ball 3/98 (33.5 overs) |

Derbyshire won by 3 wickets
Trent Bridge, Nottinghamshire
Umpires: Neil Mallender and Paul Pollard

- Derbyshire won the toss and elected to field.
- Ben Aitchison (Derbyshire) made his first-class debut.
- This was Derbyshire's highest successful run-chase against another county team.
- Points: Derbyshire 20, Nottinghamshire 6.

1–4 August 2020
Scorecard

| Durham | v | Yorkshire |
| 103 (58.4 overs); Gareth Harte 33* (87); Ben Coad 4/23 (16.4 overs) | | 199 (62.4 overs); Tom Kohler-Cadmore 41 (41); Paul Coughlin 3/46 (14.4 overs) |
| 266 (109.2 overs); Alex Lees 106 (263); Matthew Fisher 4/54 (26 overs) | | 172/4 (44.4 overs); Dawid Malan 73 (105); Chris Rushworth 3/52 (15 overs) |

Yorkshire won by 6 wickets
Riverside Ground, Chester-le-Street
Umpires: Graham Lloyd and Neil Pratt

- Durham won the toss and elected to bat.
- Jack Shutt (Yorkshire) made his first-class debut.
- Chris Rushworth (Durham) took his 500th first-class wicket.
- Points: Yorkshire 19, Durham 3.

1–4 August 2020
Scorecard

| Lancashire | v | Leicestershire |
| 322 (107.5 overs); Dane Vilas 90 (125); Dieter Klein 3/81 (20 overs) | | 409/8d (119 overs); Ben Slater 172 (338); Tom Hartley 3/117 (33 overs) |
| 236 (109.1 overs); Alex Davies 54 (85); Ben Mike 4/39 (17.1 overs) | | 150/3 (15.4 overs); Colin Ackermann 73* (41); Tom Bailey 2/63 (6.4 overs) |

Leicestershire won by 7 wickets
New Road, Worcester
Umpires: Nick Cook and Rob White

- Lancashire won the toss and elected to bat.
- George Balderson, Tom Hartley and Ed Moulton (Lancashire) all made their first-class debuts.
- Points: Leicestershire 22, Lancashire 4.

8–11 August 2020
Scorecard

| Leicestershire | v | Derbyshire |
| 199 (68 overs); Harry Dearden 70 (107); Dustin Melton 4/22 (13 overs) | | 408 (106.4 overs); Wayne Madsen 103 (174); Colin Ackermann 2/24 (9 overs) |
| 220 (80.3 overs); Harry Dearden 47 (83); Matt Critchley 6/73 (25.3 overs) | | 12/1 (4 overs); Billy Godleman 4 (10); Callum Parkinson 1/5 (2 overs) |

Derbyshire won by 9 wickets
Grace Road, Leicester
Umpires: Paul Pollard and Tom Lungley

- Leicestershire won the toss and elected to bat.
- Ed Barnes (Derbyshire) made his first-class debut.
- Points: Derbyshire 24, Leicestershire 3.

8–11 August 2020
Scorecard

| Yorkshire | v | Nottinghamshire |
| 264 (81.2 overs); Jordan Thompson 98 (103); Chris Nash 3/20 (6.4 overs) | | 355 (95.1 overs); Tom Moores 106 (140); Dawid Malan 2/24 (6 overs) |
| 278 (108 overs); Jonny Bairstow 75 (140); Zak Chappell 4/59 (17 overs) | | 97 (29.2 overs); Ben Duckett 19 (22); Jordan Thompson 3/6 (5 overs) |

Yorkshire won by 90 runs
Trent Bridge, Nottinghamshire
Umpires: James Middlebrook and Tim Robinson

- Yorkshire won the toss and elected to bat.
- Dom Leech (Yorkshire) made his first-class debut.
- Points: Yorkshire 21, Nottinghamshire 7.

8–11 August 2020
Scorecard

| Durham | v | Lancashire |
| 180 (78.3 overs); Alex Lees 66 (205); Richard Gleeson 3/32 (14 overs) | | 308 (105.1 overs); Josh Bohannon 75 (190); Matt Salisbury 4/57 (23.1 overs) |
| 110 (42.1 overs); Jack Burnham 27 (41); Liam Hurt 4/27 (10 overs) |

Lancashire won by an innings and 18 runs
Riverside Ground, Chester-le-Street
Umpires: Neil Mallender and Neil Pratt

- Durham won the toss and elected to bat.
- Points: Lancashire 22, Durham 3.

15–18 August 2020
Scorecard

| Durham | v | Leicestershire |
| 291/8d (89.1 overs); David Bedingham 96 (139); Gavin Griffiths 3/52 (23 overs) | | 0/0f (0 overs) |
| 0/0f (0 overs) | | 208/3 (63.5 overs); Sam Evans 85 (175); Cameron Steel 1/8 (12 overs) |

Match drawn
Grace Road, Leicester
Umpires: Nick Cook and Neil Mallender

- Leicestershire won the toss and elected to field.
- After rain washed out most of the match, both teams agreed to forfeit an innings in an attempt to produce a result.
- Points: Durham 10, Leicestershire 10.

15–18 August 2020
Scorecard

| Nottinghamshire | v | Lancashire |
| 472 (119.5 overs); Ben Slater 142 (298); Liam Livingstone 3/79 (14.5 overs) | | 173 (64.3 overs); Steven Croft 59 (114); Peter Trego 3/33 (14.3 overs) |
| | | 120/0 (40 overs) (f/o); Alex Davies 69* (112) |

Match drawn
Trent Bridge Cricket Ground, Nottingham
Umpires: Paul Baldwin and Tim Robinson

- Lancashire won the toss and elected to field.
- No play was possible on day 2 due to rain.
- Points: Nottinghamshire 16, Lancashire 9.

15–18 August 2020
Scorecard

| Yorkshire | v | Derbyshire |
| 400/6d (101.1 overs); Dawid Malan 219 (244); Michael Cohen 2/93 (22 overs) | | 300/7d (107.1 overs); Anuj Dal 78* (115); Steven Patterson 3/27 (22 overs) |

Match drawn
Headingley Cricket Ground, Leeds
Umpires: Peter Hartley and James Middlebrook

- Derbyshire won the toss and elected to field.
- Only 1 over was bowled on day 2 due to rain.
- George Hill (Yorkshire) made his first-class debut.
- Dawid Malan (Yorkshire) scored his maiden double century in first-class cricket.
- Points: Yorkshire 15, Derbyshire 13.

22–25 August 2020
Scorecard

| Yorkshire | v | Lancashire |
| 260 (93 overs); Adam Lyth 103 (235); Danny Lamb 4/55 (23 overs) | | 195/5 (69 overs); Alex Davies 73 (134); Adam Lyth 1/12 (6 overs) |

Match drawn
Headingley Cricket Ground, Leeds
Umpires: Peter Hartley and James Middlebrook

- Yorkshire won the toss and elected to bat.
- Only 2.1 overs were bowled on day 1 due to rain.
- No play was possible on day 4 due to rain.
- George Burrows (Lancashire) made his first-class debut.
- Points: Yorkshire 11, Lancashire 11.

22–25 August 2020
Scorecard

| Durham | v | Derbyshire |
| 337/9d (114 overs); Paul Coughlin 90 (146); Matt Critchley 4/53 (18 overs) | | 355/4 (98 overs); Luis Reece 122 (235); Matt Salisbury 1/42 (18 overs) |

Match drawn
Riverside Ground, Chester-le-Street
Umpires: Neil Pratt and Steve O'Shaughnessy

- Derbyshire won the toss and elected to field.
- No play was possible on day 4 due to rain.
- Points: Derbyshire 14, Durham 12.

22–25 August 2020
Scorecard

| Leicestershire | v | Nottinghamshire |
| 222 (74.1 overs); Tom Taylor 57 (78); Peter Trego 3/46 (22 overs) | | 343/8d (99.5 overs); Haseeb Hameed 87 (188); Ben Mike 3/48 (20 overs) |
| 237/4 (91.2 overs); Colin Ackermann 65 (159); Peter Trego 2/63 (17 overs) |

Match drawn
Grace Road, Leicester
Umpires: Hassan Adnan and Nick Cook

- Nottinghamshire won the toss and elected to field.
- Points: Nottinghamshire 14, Leicestershire 11.

6–9 September 2020
Scorecard

| Lancashire | v | Derbyshire |
| 219 (101.3 overs); Josh Bohannon 94 (217); Dustin Melton 3/46 (17 overs) | | 195 (93.3 overs); Harvey Hosein 84 (226); Danny Lamb 4/60 (22.3 overs) |
| 356/6d (72.2 overs); Alex Davies 86 (92); Matt Critchley 4/126 (26 overs) | | 202 (90.4 overs); Luis Reece 69 (135); Jack Morley 4/62 (30 overs) |

Lancashire won by 178 runs
Aigburth Cricket Ground, Liverpool
Umpires: Steve O'Shaughnessy and Graham Lloyd

- Lancashire won the toss and elected to bat.
- George Lavelle and Jack Morley (Lancashire) both made their first-class debuts.
- Points: Lancashire 20, Derbyshire 3.

6–9 September 2020
Scorecard

| Durham | v | Nottinghamshire |
| 294 (103 overs); Gareth Harte 72 (143); Zak Chappell 4/92 (23 overs) | | 422 (101 overs); Ben Duckett 150 (210); Chris Rushworth 7/108 (26 overs) |
| 329 (140 overs); Michael Jones 82 (224); Samit Patel 4/80 (38 overs) | | 82/1 (9.2 overs); Ben Duckett 36* (28); Ben Raine 1/43 (4.2 overs) |

Match drawn
Trent Bridge, Nottinghamshire
Umpires: Nick Cook and Ian Ramage

- Durham won the toss and elected to bat.
- Points: Nottinghamshire 16, Durham 13.

6–9 September 2020
Scorecard

| Leicestershire | v | Yorkshire |
| 124 (48.2 overs); Harry Swindells 36 (93); Ben Coad 5/18 (13.2 overs) | | 252 (69 overs); Jonny Tattersall 71 (133); Arron Lilley 3/21 (6 overs) |
| 161 (51 overs); Colin Ackermann 47 (83); Jordan Thompson 5/31 (11 overs) | | 37/0 (6.2 overs); Tom Kohler-Cadmore 23* (18) |

Yorkshire won by 10 wickets
Headingley Cricket Ground, Leeds
Umpires: James Middlebrook and Peter Hartley

- Yorkshire won the toss and elected to field.
- No play was possible on day 2 due to rain.
- Points: Yorkshire 21, Leicestershire 3.

=== Central Group ===
1–4 August 2020
Scorecard

| Gloucestershire | v | Worcestershire |
| 267 (96.3 overs); Chris Dent 92 (184); Charlie Morris 4/52 (22.3 overs) | | 428/5 (120 overs); Brett D'Oliveira 91* (104); David Payne 1/54 (22 overs) |
| 270 (104.3 overs); George Hankins 69 (195); Joe Leach 4/72 (26.3 overs) | | 113/2 (26.1 overs); Tom Fell 32* (32); Josh Shaw 2/26 (5 overs) |

Worcestershire won by 8 wickets
Bristol County Ground, Bristol
Umpires: Jeremy Lloyds and Mark Newell

- Gloucestershire won the toss and elected to bat.
- Tom Price (Gloucestershire) made his first-class debut.
- Points: Worcestershire 22, Gloucestershire 3.

1–4 August 2020
Scorecard

| Somerset | v | Glamorgan |
| 296 (81 overs); Steven Davies 81* (108); Ruaidhri Smith 3/41 (14 overs) | | 131 (46.1 overs); Graham Wagg 28 (60); Craig Overton 5/38 (17 overs) |
| 290/8d (80.1 overs); Tom Abell 119 (167); Kieran Bull 3/112 (19.1 overs) | | 166 (64.2 overs); Chris Cooke 82 (138); Jamie Overton 5/48 (17 overs) |

Somerset won by 289 runs
County Ground, Taunton
Umpires: Ian Blackwell and Russell Warren

- Somerset won the toss and elected to bat.
- Tom Lammonby (Somerset) made his first-class debut.
- Ben Green replaced George Bartlett for Somerset on day 3 as a concussion substitute.
- Points: Somerset 21, Glamorgan 3.

1–4 August 2020
Scorecard

| Northamptonshire | v | Warwickshire |
| 142 (51 overs); Luke Procter 29 (47); Olly Stone 4/39 (14 overs) | | 369/8 (120 overs); Tim Bresnan 105 (209); Nathan Buck 3/64 (26 overs) |
| 507/6d (175 overs); Adam Rossington 135* (399); Tim Bresnan 3/37 (26 overs) |

Match drawn
Edgbaston Cricket Ground, Birmingham
Umpires: Hassan Adnan and Tim Robinson

- Warwickshire won the toss and elected to field.
- Jack White (Northamptonshire) made his first-class debut.
- Points: Warwickshire 14, Northamptonshire 10.

8–11 August 2020
Scorecard

| Gloucestershire | v | Warwickshire |
| 210 (96.3 overs); Ben Charlesworth 51 (124); Oliver Hannon-Dalby 6/33 (23.3 overs) | | 247 (90.3 overs); Matt Lamb 65 (137); Ryan Higgins 4/54 (24.3 overs) |
| 275 (95 overs); Graeme van Buuren 72 (132); Oliver Hannon-Dalby 6/77 (23 overs) | | 160 (60.1 overs); Will Rhodes 48 (100); Ryan Higgins 7/42 (19.1 overs) |

Gloucestershire won by 78 runs
Bristol County Ground, Bristol
Umpires: Ian Blackwell and Russell Warren

- Warwickshire won the toss and elected to field.
- Points: Gloucestershire 20, Warwickshire 4.

8–11 August 2020
Scorecard

| Somerset | v | Northamptonshire |
| 166 (47.2 overs); Jack Brooks 36 (23); Ben Sanderson 5/28 (15 overs) | | 67 (32 overs); Ben Curran 35 (59); Craig Overton 4/12 (11 overs) |
| 222 (39.1 overs); Jamie Overton 68 (43); Ben Sanderson 4/61 (13.1 overs) | | 154 (43 overs); Ricardo Vasconcelos 52 (64); Jamie Overton 4/26 (8 overs) |

Somerset won by 167 runs
County Cricket Ground, Northampton
Umpires: Rob Bailey and Nick Cook

- Somerset won the toss and elected to bat.
- Craig Overton (Somerset) took his 300th first-class wicket.
- Points: Somerset 19, Northamptonshire 3.

8–11 August 2020
Scorecard

| Worcestershire | v | Glamorgan |
| 455/8 (120 overs); Jake Libby 184 (319); Michael Hogan 3/59 (22 overs) | | 374 (116.3 overs); Billy Root 118 (284); Joe Leach 4/67 (26 overs) |
| 276/6d (71 overs); Daryl Mitchell 94 (163); Graham Wagg 2/73 (12 overs) | | 141/7 (50.4 overs); Chris Cooke 74 (133); Joe Leach 2/12 (7 overs) |

Match drawn
New Road, Worcester
Umpires: Graham Lloyd and Jeremy Lloyds

- Worcestershire won the toss and elected to bat.
- Jake Libby and Brett D'Oliveira set a new partnership record for any wicket for Worcestershire (318 runs).
- Points: Worcestershire 15, Glamorgan 12.

15–18 August 2020
Scorecard

| Warwickshire | v | Somerset |
| 121 (45.2 overs); Tim Bresnan 32* (51); Tom Abell 3/4 (3.2 overs) | | 413/9d (99 overs); Steven Davies 123* (182); Tim Bresnan 4/99 (26 overs) |
| 140/8 (56 overs); Will Rhodes 41 (117); Josh Davey 3/21 (12 overs) |

Match drawn
Edgbaston Cricket Ground, Birmingham
Umpires: Tom Lungley and Russell Warren

- Warwickshire won the toss and elected to bat.
- Jamie Overton (Somerset) scored his maiden century in first-class cricket.
- Points: Somerset 16, Warwickshire 11.

15–18 August 2020
Scorecard

| Glamorgan | v | Gloucestershire |
| 116 (59.3 overs); Dan Douthwaite 30* (52); David Payne 5/31 (17 overs) | | 181 (64.2 overs); Ryan Higgins 48 (62); Graham Wagg 3/38 (13 overs) |
| 197/8 (91 overs); Chris Cooke 59* (158); David Payne 3/30 (20 overs) |

Match drawn
Sophia Gardens, Cardiff
Umpires: Ian Blackwell and Jeff Evans

- Gloucestershire won the toss and elected to field.
- No play was possible on day 1 due to rain.
- Points: Glamorgan 11, Gloucestershire 11.

15–18 August 2020
Scorecard

| Worcestershire | v | Northamptonshire |
| 219 (64.3 overs); Riki Wessels 88 (78); Blessing Muzarabani 4/29 (12.3 overs) | | 212 (61 overs); Gareth Berg 45 (72); Ed Barnard 4/46 (17 overs) |
| 255/6d (86 overs); Tom Fell 110* (208); Nathan Buck 3/42 (19 overs) | | 184 (40.4 overs); Adam Rossington 44 (49); Dillon Pennington 3/30 (9 overs) |

Worcestershire won by 78 runs
County Cricket Ground, Northampton
Umpires: Rob Bailey and Rob White

- Northamptonshire won the toss and elected to field.
- Points: Worcestershire 20, Northamptonshire 4.

22–25 August 2020
Scorecard

| Glamorgan | v | Northamptonshire |
| 259 (67 overs); Callum Taylor 106 (94); Jack White 4/48 (12 overs) | | 332 (108.2 overs); Charlie Thurston 115 (163); Marchant de Lange 4/84 (23.2 overs) |
| 261 (53.5 overs); Marchant de Lange 113 (78); Jack White 4/35 (12 overs) | | 192/4 (42.3 overs); Emilio Gay 77* (145); Dan Douthwaite 1/33 (7 overs) |

Northamptonshire won by 6 wickets
County Cricket Ground, Northampton
Umpires: Chris Watts and Russell Warren

- Northamptonshire won the toss and elected to field.
- Callum Taylor (Glamorgan) made his first-class debut.
- Callum Taylor became the fourth batsman for Glamorgan to score a century on debut in a first-class match.
- Marchant de Lange scored the fastest century by a batsman for Glamorgan in first-class cricket, reaching the milestone in 62 balls.
- Points: Northamptonshire 22, Glamorgan 5.

22–25 August 2020
Scorecard

| Somerset | v | Gloucestershire |
| 237 (72.2 overs); George Bartlett 100* (143); David Payne 4/44 (19 overs) | | 76 (38.2 overs); Tom Lace 21 (59); Craig Overton 4/25 (13.2 overs) |
| 223/1d (54 overs); Tom Abell 101* (157); David Payne 1/31 (11 overs) | | 70 (35.3 overs); Ryan Higgins 21 (55); Craig Overton 5/26 (13 overs) |

Somerset won by 314 runs
County Ground, Taunton
Umpires: Ian Blackwell and Paul Baldwin

- Gloucestershire won the toss and elected to field.
- Points: Somerset 20, Gloucestershire 3.

22–25 August 2020
Scorecard

| Warwickshire | v | Worcestershire |
| 355/9d (119.1 overs); Will Rhodes 207 (328); Charlie Morris 5/80 (23 overs) | | 410/7 (120 overs); Daryl Mitchell 110 (235); Oliver Hannon-Dalby 3/70 (26 overs) |
| 68/0 (23 overs); Will Rhodes 42* (61) |

Match drawn
New Road, Worcester
Umpires: Jeremy Lloyds and Rob Bailey

- Worcestershire won the toss and elected to field.
- No play was possible on day 4 due to rain.
- Points: Worcestershire 13, Warwickshire 13.

6–9 September 2020
Scorecard

| Somerset | v | Worcestershire |
| 251 (83.1 overs); Tom Abell 59 (112); Dillon Pennington 3/49 (20 overs) | | 200 (62 overs); Jake Libby 58 (133); Josh Davey 3/32 (14 overs) |
| 193 (70.4 overs); Tom Lammonby 107* (220); Ed Barnard 4/25 (17 overs) | | 184 (71.2 overs); Ben Cox 32 (68); Josh Davey 3/16 (14.2 overs) |

Somerset won by 60 runs
New Road, Worcester
Umpires: Rob Bailey and Neil Mallender

- Somerset won the toss and elected to bat.
- Points: Somerset 21, Worcestershire 4.

6–9 September 2020
Scorecard

| Warwickshire | v | Glamorgan |
| 186 (66.3 overs); Ian Bell 50 (116); Dan Douthwaite 3/42 (13 overs) | | 203 (68.4 overs); Billy Root 51* (100); Liam Norwell 4/43 (20 overs) |
| 347/7d (88.5 overs); Ian Bell 90 (148); Dan Douthwaite 2/61 (13.1 overs) | | 265/9 (95 overs); Nick Selman 73 (215); Oliver Hannon-Dalby 4/59 (25 overs) |

Match drawn
Sophia Gardens, Cardiff
Umpires: Jeff Evans and Rob White

- Glamorgan won the toss and elected to field.
- Points: Glamorgan 12, Warwickshire 11.

6–9 September 2020
Scorecard

| Gloucestershire | v | Northamptonshire |
| 66/6 (29.4 overs); Graeme van Buuren 22 (42); Jack White 2/18 (8 overs) |

Match drawn
Bristol County Ground, Bristol
Umpires: Jeremy Lloyds and Ian Blackwell

- Northamptonshire won the toss and elected to field.
- The match was called off after lunch on day 1 due to a COVID-19 related issue.
- Harry Gouldstone (Northamptonshire) made his first-class debut.
- Points: Northamptonshire 10, Gloucestershire 8.

=== South Group ===
1–4 August 2020
Scorecard

| Middlesex | v | Surrey |
| 347/6d (111.3 overs); Nick Gubbins 192 (315); Rikki Clarke 3/48 (19 overs) | | 282 (101 overs); Scott Borthwick 92 (240); Tim Murtagh 5/47 (25 overs) |
| 347/6d (70.2 overs); Nick Gubbins 60 (93); Dan Moriarty 5/64 (23.2 overs) | | 123 (62.5 overs); Ryan Patel 44 (82); Miguel Cummins 3/30 (14 overs) |

Middlesex won by 190 runs
The Oval, London
Umpires: Rob Bailey and Nigel Llong

- Middlesex won the toss and elected to bat.
- Thilan Walallawita (Middlesex) and Dan Moriarty (Surrey) both made their first-class debuts.
- Dan Moriarty (Surrey) took his maiden five-wicket haul in first-class cricket.
- Points: Middlesex 22, Surrey 3.

1–4 August 2020
Scorecard

| Sussex | v | Hampshire |
| 176 (61.1 overs); Phil Salt 68 (83); Ajeet Singh Dale 3/20 (10 overs) | | 153 (62.2 overs); Harry Came 25 (67); Mitch Claydon 3/31 (14 overs) |
| 221 (71 overs); Phil Salt 80 (134); Felix Organ 3/41 (11 overs) | | 150 (43.1 overs); James Fuller 30 (31); Ollie Robinson 5/29 (13.1 overs) |

Sussex won by 94 runs
County Cricket Ground, Hove
Umpires: Ian Gould and Billy Taylor

- Sussex won the toss and elected to bat.
- Jack Carson, Henry Crocombe (Sussex) and Ajeet Singh Dale (Hampshire) all made their first-class debuts.
- Mitch Claydon (Sussex) took his 300th first-class wicket.
- Keith Barker (Hampshire) took his 400th first-class wicket.
- Points: Sussex 19, Hampshire 3.

1–4 August 2020
Scorecard

| Kent | v | Essex |
| 387 (104.3 overs); Heino Kuhn 140 (248); Jamie Porter 4/107 (26 overs) | | 298 (108.2 overs); Ryan ten Doeschate 78 (170); Matt Milnes 4/46 (20.2 overs) |
| 112 (49.1 overs); Jordan Cox 29 (116); Simon Harmer 4/35 (18.1 overs) | | 202/8 (69.4 overs); Alastair Cook 66 (116); Ivan Thomas 4/32 (8 overs) |

Essex won by 2 wickets
County Cricket Ground, Chelmsford
Umpires: Neil Bainton and Ben Debenham

- Kent won the toss and elected to bat.
- Feroze Khushi (Essex) made his first-class debut.
- Points: Essex 21, Kent 7.

8–11 August 2020
Scorecard

| Essex | v | Surrey |
| 262 (95.4 overs); Feroze Khushi 66 (108); Rikki Clarke 3/26 (21 overs) | | 187 (75.3 overs); Will Jacks 70 (127); Simon Harmer 6/67 (31.3 overs) |
| 261 (75.4 overs); Paul Walter 46 (97); Adam Finch 4/38 (12 overs) | | 167 (75.1 overs); Jamie Smith 45 (89); Simon Harmer 8/64 (34.1 overs) |

Essex won by 169 runs
County Cricket Ground, Chelmsford
Umpires: Ben Debenham and Chris Watts

- Essex won the toss and elected to bat.
- Gus Atkinson (Surrey) made his first-class debut.
- Points: Essex 21, Surrey 3.

8–11 August 2020
Scorecard

| Sussex | v | Kent |
| 332 (94.3 overs); Ben Brown 98 (175); Harry Podmore 4/85 (23.3 overs) | | 530/1 (120 overs); Jordan Cox 238* (345); Mitch Claydon 1/86 (24 overs) |
| 173 (46.1 overs); Harry Finch 66 (98); Darren Stevens 5/50 (15 overs) |

Kent won by an innings and 25 runs
St Lawrence Ground, Canterbury
Umpires: Nigel Llong and Mark Newell

- Sussex won the toss and elected to bat.
- Jordan Cox (Kent) scored his maiden century in first-class cricket.
- Jordan Cox and Jack Leaning (Kent) both scored their maiden double centuries in first-class cricket.
- Jordan Cox and Jack Leaning also set a new record for the highest partnership for any wicket for Kent in a first-class match (423 runs).
- Points: Kent 24, Sussex 3.

8–11 August 2020
Scorecard

| Middlesex | v | Hampshire |
| 252 (73.5 overs); Martin Andersson 92 (133); Ryan Stevenson 4/71 (19 overs) | | 296 (111 overs); Joe Weatherley 98 (226); Tim Murtagh 4/61 (30 overs) |
| 201 (53 overs); Nick Gubbins 46 (65); Felix Organ 4/42 (13 overs) | | 161/7 (61.3 overs); Joe Weatherley 64* (178); Thilan Walallawita 3/28 (16 overs) |

Hampshire won by 3 wickets
Brunton Memorial Ground, Radlett
Umpires: Neil Bainton and Rob White

- Hampshire won the toss and elected to field.
- Points: Hampshire 21, Middlesex 5.

15–18 August 2020
Scorecard

| Middlesex | v | Kent |
| 269 (108 overs); Robbie White 99 (220); Darren Stevens 5/79 (31 overs) | | 191 (64.1 overs); Joe Denly 89 (154); Miguel Cummins 5/62 (19.1 overs) |
| 169/1d (40 overs); Sam Robson 82* (143); Marcus O'Riordan 1/42 (8 overs) | | 70/0 (14 overs); Marcus O'Riordan 34* (41) |

Match drawn
St Lawrence Ground, Canterbury
Umpires: Neil Bainton and Nigel Llong

- Kent won the toss and elected to field.
- Jack Davies (Middlesex) made his first-class debut.
- Points: Middlesex 13, Kent 11.

15–18 August 2020
Scorecard

| Sussex | v | Essex |
| 194 (77.1 overs); Phil Salt 57 (82); Jamie Porter 5/60 (24 overs) | | 140 (55.3 overs); Paul Walter 33 (77); George Garton 5/26 (10.3 overs) |
| 141 (56.5 overs); Delray Rawlins 40 (42); Simon Harmer 5/54 (19 overs) | | 199/7 (45.5 overs); Dan Lawrence 60 (77); George Garton 4/50 (12 overs) |

Essex won by 3 wickets
County Cricket Ground, Hove
Umpires: Ian Gould and Mark Newell

- Essex won the toss and elected to field.
- George Garton (Sussex) took his maiden five-wicket haul in first-class cricket.
- Points: Essex 19, Sussex 3.

15–18 August 2020
Scorecard

| Surrey | v | Hampshire |
| 172 (49 overs); Laurie Evans 65 (87); Ian Holland 6/60 (20 overs) | | 298 (80.4 overs); Tom Alsop 87 (160); Amar Virdi 6/101 (26 overs) |
| 74 (32.4 overs); Jamie Smith 22* (41); James Fuller 4/17 (7 overs) |

Hampshire won by an innings and 52 runs
Arundel Castle Cricket Ground, Arundel
Umpires: Ben Debenham and Billy Taylor

- Surrey won the toss and elected to bat.
- Tom Scriven (Hampshire) made his first-class debut.
- Ian Holland (Hampshire) took his maiden five-wicket haul in first-class cricket.
- James Fuller (Hampshire) took a hat-trick during Surrey's second innings.
- Points: Hampshire 21, Surrey 3.

22–25 August 2020
Scorecard

| Essex | v | Hampshire |
| 249/3 (78 overs); Alastair Cook 129* (215); Ian Holland 1/25 (17 overs) |

Match drawn
Arundel Castle Cricket Ground, Arundel
Umpires: Billy Taylor and Ian Gould

- Hampshire won the toss and elected to field.
- No play was possible on days 1 and 4 due to rain.
- Alastair Cook (Essex) scored his 24,000th run in first-class cricket.
- Points: Hampshire 9, Essex 9.

22–25 August 2020
Scorecard

| Sussex | v | Middlesex |
| 293 (87.5 overs); Harry Finch 69 (159); Martin Andersson 4/77 (18 overs) | | 203 (68 overs); John Simpson 48 (64); Jack Carson 4/46 (15 overs) |
| 102 (35.5 overs); Ben Brown 45 (78); Tim Murtagh 5/34 (13 overs) | | 193/5 (54 overs); Robbie White 35 (81); Ollie Robinson 4/54 (18 overs) |

Middlesex won by 5 wickets
Brunton Memorial Ground, Radlett
Umpires: Tim Robinson and Ben Debenham

- Sussex won the toss and elected to bat.
- Blake Cullen (Middlesex) and Will Sheffield (Sussex) both made their first-class debuts.
- Points: Middlesex 20, Sussex 5.

22–25 August 2020
Scorecard

| Kent | v | Surrey |
| 342 (103.1 overs); Grant Stewart 58 (103); Adam Finch 4/69 (23.1 overs) | | 278 (91.4 overs); Ben Foakes 118 (188); Darren Stevens 3/45 (25 overs) |
| 127 (46.5 overs); Jordan Cox 32 (74); Rikki Clarke 5/20 (14 overs) | | 174 (48.1 overs); Ben Foakes 57 (131); Darren Stevens 4/41 (13 overs) |

Kent won by 17 runs
The Oval, London
Umpires: Neil Bainton and Nigel Llong

- Surrey won the toss and elected to field.
- Nathan Gilchrist (Kent) made his first-class debut.
- Points: Kent 21, Surrey 5.
- Kent were deducted one point for a slow over-rate.

6–9 September 2020
Scorecard

| Middlesex | v | Essex |
| 138 (53.3 overs); James Harris 34 (64); Sam Cook 4/27 (15 overs) | | 236 (73 overs); Adam Wheater 83* (142); Martin Andersson 4/38 (11 overs) |
| 150 (69.5 overs); Max Holden 37 (98); Aaron Beard 4/21 (10 overs) | | 53/1 (13.5 overs); Alastair Cook 21 (34); Tim Murtagh 1/17 (6 overs) |

Essex won by 9 wickets
County Cricket Ground, Chelmsford
Umpires: Russell Warren and Paul Pollard

- Middlesex won the toss and elected to bat.
- Points: Essex 20, Middlesex 3.

6–9 September 2020
Scorecard

| Hampshire | v | Kent |
| 191 (75 overs); Ian Holland 42 (69); Darren Stevens 5/37 (27 overs) | | 170 (61 overs); Marcus O'Riordan 37 (82); Scott Currie 3/42 (13 overs) |
| 159 (64.1 overs); Tom Scriven 68 (132); Harry Podmore 5/43 (23 overs) | | 185/3 (41.5 overs); Zak Crawley 105 (100); Ajeet Singh Dale 1/22 (5 overs) |

Kent won by 7 wickets
St Lawrence Ground, Canterbury
Umpires: Nigel Llong and Billy Taylor

- Kent won the toss and elected to field.
- Scott Currie (Hampshire) made his first-class debut.
- Points: Kent 19, Hampshire 3.

6–9 September 2020
Scorecard

| Sussex | v | Surrey |
| 415 (118.3 overs); Tom Haines 117 (249); Dan Moriarty 5/154 (37.3 overs) | | 388 (113.5 overs); Rory Burns 103 (121); Jack Carson 5/93 (34.5 overs) |
| 128 (38.2 overs); Stuart Meaker 42 (71); Dan Moriarty 6/70 (19 overs) | | 157/4 (44.5 overs); Rory Burns 52 (71); James Coles 2/32 (11 overs) |

Surrey won by 6 wickets
The Oval, London
Umpires: Ben Debenham and Neil Bainton

- Sussex won the toss and elected to bat.
- James Coles (Sussex) made his first-class debut.
- Points: Surrey 22, Sussex 6.

== Standings ==
Teams receive 16 points for a win and 8 for a draw or tie. Bonus points (a maximum of 5 batting points and 3 bowling points) may be scored during the first 110 overs of each team's first innings.

=== North Group ===
| Team | Pld | W | L | T | D | A | Bat | Bowl | Ded | PCF | Pts |
|---|---|---|---|---|---|---|---|---|---|---|---|
| Yorkshire | 5 | 3 | 0 | 0 | 2 | 0 | 11 | 12 | 0 | 0 | 87 |
| Derbyshire | 5 | 2 | 1 | 0 | 2 | 0 | 13 | 13 | 0 | 0 | 74 |
| Lancashire | 5 | 2 | 1 | 0 | 2 | 0 | 7 | 11 | 0 | 0 | 66 |
| Nottinghamshire | 5 | 0 | 2 | 0 | 3 | 0 | 20 | 15 | 0 | 0 | 59 |
| Leicestershire | 5 | 1 | 2 | 0 | 2 | 0 | 4 | 13 | 0 | 0 | 49 |
| Durham | 5 | 0 | 2 | 0 | 3 | 0 | 7 | 10 | 0 | 0 | 41 |

Source: BBC Sport, CricInfo, ECB

=== Central Group ===
| Team | Pld | W | L | T | D | A | Bat | Bowl | Ded | PCF | Pts |
|---|---|---|---|---|---|---|---|---|---|---|---|
| Somerset (Q) | 5 | 4 | 0 | 0 | 1 | 0 | 10 | 15 | 0 | 0 | 97 |
| Worcestershire | 5 | 2 | 1 | 0 | 2 | 0 | 14 | 12 | 0 | 0 | 74 |
| Warwickshire | 5 | 0 | 1 | 0 | 4 | 0 | 7 | 14 | 0 | 0 | 53 |
| Northamptonshire | 5 | 1 | 2 | 0 | 2 | 0 | 4 | 13 | 0 | 0 | 49 |
| Gloucestershire | 5 | 1 | 2 | 0 | 2 | 0 | 3 | 10 | 0 | 0 | 45 |
| Glamorgan | 5 | 0 | 2 | 0 | 3 | 0 | 6 | 13 | 0 | 0 | 43 |

Source: BBC Sport, CricInfo, ECB
(Q) Qualified for Final

=== South Group ===
| Team | Pld | W | L | T | D | A | Bat | Bowl | Ded | PCF | Pts |
|---|---|---|---|---|---|---|---|---|---|---|---|
| Essex (Q) | 5 | 4 | 0 | 0 | 1 | 0 | 6 | 12 | 0 | 0 | 90 |
| Kent (Note: Kent were deducted 1 point for a slow over rate against Surrey.) | 5 | 3 | 1 | 0 | 1 | 0 | 12 | 15 | 1 | 0 | 82 |
| Middlesex | 5 | 2 | 2 | 0 | 1 | 0 | 8 | 14 | 0 | 0 | 62 |
| Hampshire | 5 | 2 | 2 | 0 | 1 | 0 | 4 | 13 | 0 | 0 | 57 |
| Surrey | 5 | 1 | 4 | 0 | 0 | 0 | 8 | 12 | 0 | 0 | 36 |
| Sussex (Note: Sussex were deducted 24 points for ball tampering against Middlesex.) | 5 | 1 | 4 | 0 | 0 | 0 | 9 | 11 | 24 | 0 | 12 |

Source: BBC Sport, CricInfo, ECB
(Q) Qualified for Final

== Final ==
23–27 September 2020
Scorecard

| Somerset | v | Essex |
| 301 (102 overs); Eddie Byrom 117 (217); Sam Cook 5/76 (32 overs) | | 337/8 (120 overs); Alastair Cook 172 (289); Lewis Gregory 6/72 (27 overs) |
| 272/7d (76 overs); Tom Lammonby 116 (151); Jamie Porter 4/73 (23 overs) | | 179/6 (80.3 overs); Ryan ten Doeschate 46 (137); Jack Leach 3/38 (22 overs) |

Match drawn
Lord's, London
Umpires: Russell Warren and Rob Bailey

- Essex won the toss and elected to field.
- Only 44 overs were bowled on day 1 due to rain.
- Essex won the Bob Willis Trophy on first innings lead.
