= Michael Barnard =

Michael or Mike Barnard may refer to:

- Mike Barnard (cricketer, born 1990), English cricketer
- Mike Barnard (sportsman) (1933–2018), English cricketer and footballer
- Michael Barnard (politician) (1942–1999), Australian politician
