= Thilan Walallawita =

English cricketer (born 1998)

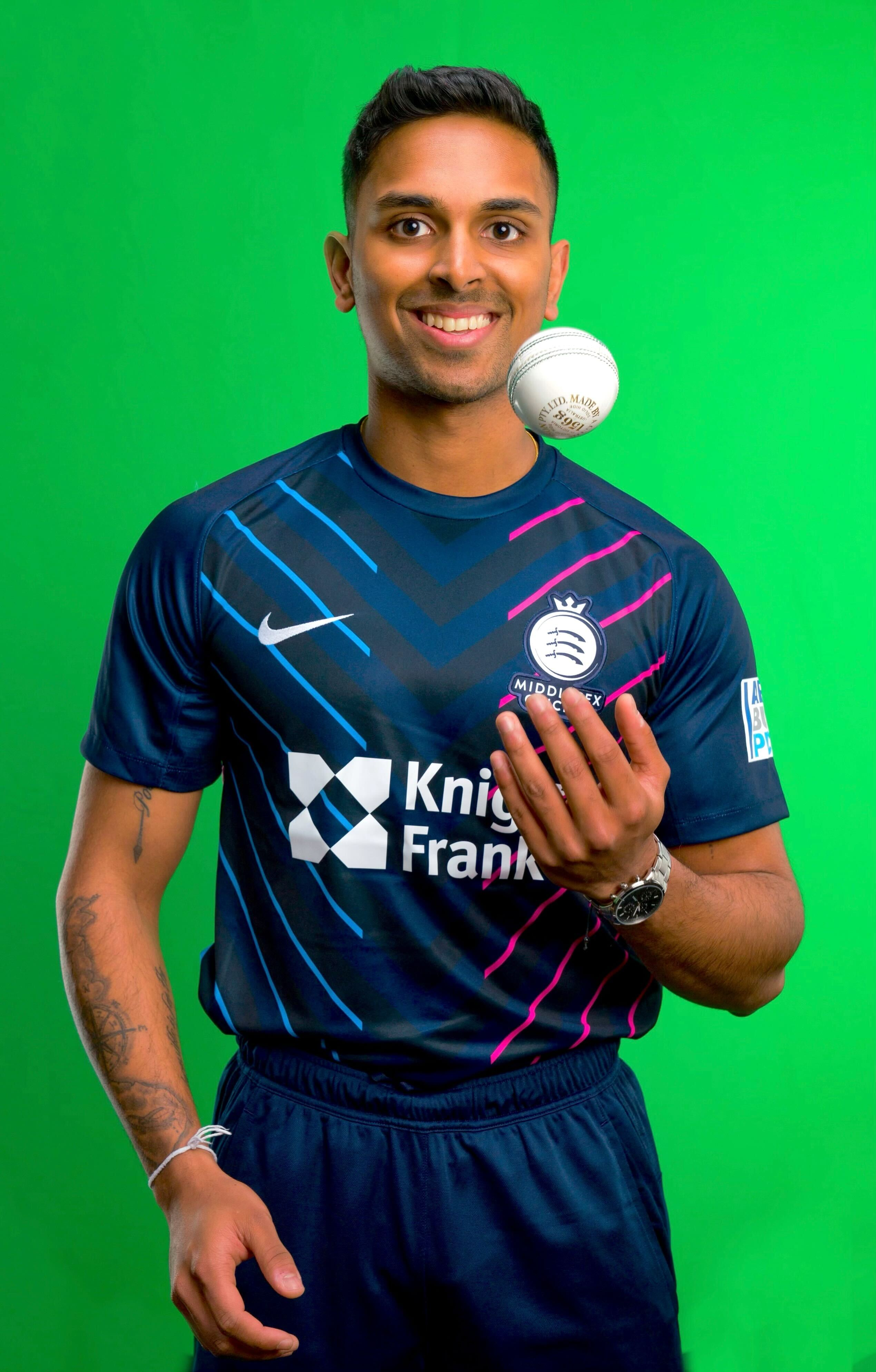
- Thilan Walallawita in 2022

Personal information
- Full name: Thilan Nipuna Walallawita
- Born: 23 June 1998 (age 28); Colombo, Sri Lanka
- Batting: Left-handed
- Bowling: Slow left-arm orthodox
- Role: Bowler

Domestic team information
- Years: Team
- 2020–2024: Middlesex (squad no. 32)
- 2022/23: Panadura Sports Club
- FC debut: 1 August 2020 Middlesex v Surrey
- LA debut: 25 July 2021 Middlesex v Essex

Career statistics
Competition	FC	LA	T20
Matches	12	9	15
Runs scored	92	83	23
Batting average	8.36	11.85	4.60
100s/50s	0/0	0/0	0/0
Top score	20*	29	10
Balls bowled	1,294	480	246
Wickets	11	5	12
Bowling average	61.54	87.20	28.41
5 wickets in innings	0	0	0
10 wickets in match	0	0	0
Best bowling	3/28	2/54	3/18
Catches/stumpings	3/–	1/–	4/–
- Source: Cricinfo, 30 September 2023

Thilan Nipuna Walallawita (born 23 June 1998) is an English cricketer. Walallawita was born in Colombo, Sri Lanka and survived the Boxing Day Tsunami in 2004. In March 2022, he was granted British Citizenship, making him a home-registered player ahead of the 2022 domestic season in England.

He made his first-class debut on 1 August 2020, for Middlesex in the 2020 Bob Willis Trophy. He made his Twenty20 debut 20 September 2020, for Middlesex in the 2020 t20 Blast. He made his List A debut on 25 July 2021, for Middlesex in the 2021 Royal London One-Day Cup.
