= Jack Plom =

English cricketer (born 1999)

Personal information
- Full name: Jack Henry Plom
- Born: 27 August 1999 (age 27); Basildon, Essex, England
- Batting: Left-handed
- Bowling: Right-arm fast-medium
- Role: Bowler

Domestic team information
- Years: Team
- 2018–2022: Essex (squad no. 77)
- 2020: → Surrey (on loan)
- Only First-class: 7 April 2018; Essex v Cambridge MCCU
- List A debut: 29 July 2021 Essex v Worcestershire

Career statistics
Competition	FC	LA	T20
Matches	1	5	13
Runs scored	–	11	38
Batting average	–	11.00	7.60
100s/50s	–/–	0/0	0/0
Top score	–	9*	12
Balls bowled	–	220	244
Wickets	–	6	16
Bowling average	–	40.50	24.43
5 wickets in innings	–	0	0
10 wickets in match	–	0	0
Best bowling	–	3/34	3/31
Catches/stumpings	–/–	3/–	5/–
- Source: ESPNcricinfo, 29 July 2021

Jack Henry Plom (born 27 August 1999) is an English cricketer. He made his first-class debut on 7 April 2018 for Essex against Cambridge MCCU as part of the Marylebone Cricket Club University fixtures. He made his Twenty20 debut on 11 September 2020, for Essex in the 2020 t20 Blast. He made his List A debut on 29 July 2021, for Essex in the 2021 Royal London One-Day Cup.
