= Will Sheffield =

English cricketer (born 2000)

Personal information
- Full name: William Arthur Sheffield
- Born: 26 August 2000 (age 26); Haywards Heath, West Sussex, England
- Batting: Left-handed
- Bowling: Left-arm medium-fast
- Role: Bowler

Domestic team information
- Years: Team
- 2020: Sussex (squad no. 29)
- Only First-class: 22 August 2020 Sussex v Middlesex

Career statistics
Competition	First-class
Matches	1
Runs scored	7
Batting average	3.50
100s/50s	0/0
Top score	6
Balls bowled	90
Wickets	1
Bowling average	54.00
5 wickets in innings	0
10 wickets in match	0
Best bowling	1/45
Catches/stumpings	0/–
- Source: Cricinfo, 24 August 2020

William Arthur Sheffield (born 26 August 2000) is an English cricketer. He made his first-class debut on 22 August 2020, for Sussex in the 2020 Bob Willis Trophy.
