= Sam Wisniewski =

English cricketer (born 2001)

Personal information
- Full name: Sam Alex Wisniewski
- Born: 2 October 2001 (age 25); Huddersfield, England
- Batting: Left-handed
- Bowling: Left-arm unorthodox spin

Domestic team information
- Years: Team
- 2020: Yorkshire
- 2022: Staffordshire
- 2025: Shropshire
- T20 debut: 17 September 2020 Yorkshire v Lancashire

Career statistics
Competition	Twenty20
Matches	2
Runs scored	–
Batting average	–
100s/50s	–
Top score	–
Balls bowled	24
Wickets	0
Bowling average	–
5 wickets in innings	–
10 wickets in match	–
Best bowling	–
Catches/stumpings	0/–
- Source: Cricinfo, 20 September 2020

Sam Alex Wisniewski (born 2 October 2001) is an English cricketer. He made his Twenty20 debut 17 September 2020, for Yorkshire in the 2020 t20 Blast. He played for Pune Devils in the Abu Dhabi T10 league in 2020/21.

Wisniewski acted in the 2013 film Believe. He played the character Paul, aged 11.
