= Vikai Kelley =

English cricketer (born 2002)

Personal information
- Born: 2 September 2002 (age 24); Wolverhampton, England
- Batting: Right-handed
- Role: Wicket-keeper

Domestic team information
- Years: Team
- 2020–2021: Warwickshire
- Only T20: 1 September 2020 Bears v Northamptonshire

Career statistics
Competition	Twenty20
Matches	1
Runs scored	5
Batting average	5.00
100s/50s	0/0
Top score	5
Catches/stumpings	0/2
- Source: Cricinfo, 5 September 2020

Vikai Kelley (born 2 September 2002) is an English cricketer. He made his Twenty20 debut on 1 September 2020, for the Birmingham Bears in the 2020 t20 Blast. He moved into the Leicestershire academy prior to the 2022 season.
