= Harry Gouldstone =

English cricketer (born 2001)

Personal information
- Full name: Harry Oliver Michael Gouldstone
- Born: 26 March 2001 (age 25); Kettering, Northamptonshire, England
- Batting: Right-handed
- Role: Wicket-keeper

Domestic team information
- Years: Team
- 2020–2023: Northamptonshire
- FC debut: 6 September 2020 Northamptonshire v Gloucestershire

Career statistics
Competition	First-class
Matches	7
Runs scored	163
Batting average	16.30
100s/50s	0/1
Top score	67*
Catches/stumpings	4/0
- Source: Cricinfo, 13 May 2023

Harry Oliver Michael Gouldstone (born 26 March 2001) is an English cricketer. He made his first-class debut on 6 September 2020, for Northamptonshire in the 2020 Bob Willis Trophy.
