= George Burrows (cricketer) =

English cricketer (born 1998)

Personal information
- Full name: George Davidson Burrows
- Born: 22 June 1998 (age 28); Wigan, Greater Manchester, England
- Batting: Right-handed
- Bowling: Right-arm fast-medium
- Role: Bowler

Domestic team information
- Years: Team
- 2020–2021: Lancashire (squad no. 21)
- 2022: Sussex (squad no. 31)
- FC debut: 22 August 2020 Lancashire v Yorkshire

Career statistics
Competition	First-class
Matches	4
Runs scored	3
Batting average	0.75
100s/50s	0/0
Top score	2
Balls bowled	504
Wickets	5
Bowling average	63.00
5 wickets in innings	0
10 wickets in match	0
Best bowling	2/20
Catches/stumpings	0/–
- Source: Cricinfo, 1 May 2022

George Davidson Burrows (born 22 June 1998) is an English cricketer. He made his first-class debut on 22 August 2020, for Lancashire in the 2020 Bob Willis Trophy. In November 2021, he was released by Lancashire. In March 2022, Burrows was signed by Sussex for a month-long contract for the start of the 2022 cricket season.
