= Andrew Barnard (cricketer) =

English cricketer (born 1957)

Personal information
- Full name: Andrew Simon Barnard
- Born: 3 July 1957 (age 69); Gloucester, Gloucestershire, England
- Batting: Right-handed
- Bowling: Right-arm fast-medium
- Relatives: Ed Barnard (son); Mike Barnard (son)

Domestic team information
- Years: Team
- 1976–1999: Shropshire

Career statistics
Competition	List A
Matches	13
Runs scored	69
Batting average	13.80
100s/50s	0/0
Top score	28
Balls bowled	785
Wickets	13
Bowling average	33.76
5 wickets in innings	0
10 wickets in match	0
Best bowling	4/47
Catches/stumpings	5/–
- Source: Cricinfo, 28 July 2011

Andrew Simon Barnard (born 3 July 1957) is a former English cricketer. Barnard was a right-handed batsman who bowled right-arm fast-medium. He was born in Gloucester, Gloucestershire and educated at the Priory Boys' Grammar School in Shrewsbury and Loughborough College.

Barnard made his debut for Shropshire in the 1976 Minor Counties Championship against Durham. He played Minor counties cricket for Shropshire from 1976 to 1999, making 113 Minor Counties Championship appearances and 18 MCCA Knockout Trophy. He made his List A debut against Surrey in the 1978 Gillette Cup. He made 9 further List A appearances for Shropshire, the last of which came against Middlesex in the 1992 NatWest Trophy. In his 10 List A matches for the county, he took 12 wickets at an average of 31.58, with best figures of 4/47. With the bat, he scored 54 runs at an average of 18.00, with a high score of 28. He also played 4 List A matches for the Minor Counties in the 1985 Benson & Hedges Cup, although without success.

While playing for Shropshire, he was also a member of Shrewsbury Cricket Club.
