= Ed Moulton =

English cricketer (born 1999)

Personal information
- Full name: Edwin Henry Taylor Moulton
- Born: 18 April 1999 (age 27); Preston, Lancashire, England
- Batting: Right-handed
- Bowling: Right-arm medium

Domestic team information
- Years: Team
- 2020–present: Lancashire (squad no. 27)
- 2021: → Derbyshire (on loan)
- First-class debut: 1 August 2020 Lancashire v Leicestershire

Career statistics
Competition	First-class
Matches	3
Runs scored	9
Batting average	3.00
100s/50s	0/0
Top score	6*
Balls bowled	402
Wickets	3
Bowling average	89.66
5 wickets in innings	0
10 wickets in match	0
Best bowling	2/24
Catches/stumpings	0/–
- Source: Cricinfo, 26 September 2021

Edwin Henry Taylor Moulton (born 18 April 1999) is an English cricketer. He made his first-class debut on 1 August 2020, for Lancashire in the 2020 Bob Willis Trophy. Moulton signed for Lancashire ahead of the 2020 season, after playing for Chorley Cricket Club and Lancashire's second XI. In September 2021, Moulton was signed on loan to Derbyshire for the rest of the season. In November 2021, he was released by Lancashire.
