= Ollie Sale =

English cricketer (born 1995)

Personal information
- Full name: Oliver Richard Trethowan Sale
- Born: 30 September 1995 (age 31); Newcastle-under-Lyme, Staffordshire, England
- Batting: Right-handed
- Bowling: Right-arm fast-medium
- Role: Bowler

Domestic team information
- Years: Team
- 2016–2022: Somerset (squad no. 82)
- 2023: Northamptonshire
- List A debut: 12 August 2022 Somerset v Leicestershire
- Twenty20 debut: 29 July 2016 Somerset v Hampshire

Career statistics
Competition	LA	T20
Matches	3	10
Runs scored	13	20
Batting average	13.00	10.00
100s/50s	0/0	0/0
Top score	13	14*
Balls bowled	144	196
Wickets	3	13
Bowling average	60.66	26.23
5 wickets in innings	0	0
10 wickets in match	0	0
Best bowling	3/80	3/32
Catches/stumpings	1/–	3/–
- Source: CricketArchive, 17 August 2022

Oliver Richard Trethowan Sale (born 30 September 1995) is an English former cricketer who played for Somerset County Cricket Club and Northamptonshire County Cricket Club. On 29 July 2016 he made his Twenty20 debut for Somerset against Hampshire in the 2016 NatWest t20 Blast.

In September 2022, Sale confirmed he would be leaving Somerset at the end of the 2022 season to sign for Northamptonshire. In December 2023, after failing to make an appearance for Northamptonshire during the 2023 season due to injury, Sale announced his retirement from professional cricket.

== Early life ==
Ollie Sale was born on 30 September 1995 in Newcastle-under-Lyme, Staffordshire, England and attended Sherborne School in Sherborne, Dorset.
