= Mike Barnard (cricketer, born 1990) =

English cricketer

Personal information
- Full name: Michael Robert Barnard
- Born: 8 February 1990 (age 36); Shrewsbury, Shropshire, England
- Batting: Right-handed
- Bowling: Right-arm fast-medium
- Relatives: Andrew Barnard (father); Ed Barnard (brother)

Domestic team information
- Years: Team
- 2008–2019: Shropshire
- 2010: Oxford UCCE

Career statistics
Competition	First-class
Matches	1
Runs scored	0
Batting average	0.00
100s/50s	0/0
Top score	0
Balls bowled	133
Wickets	1
Bowling average	64.00
5 wickets in innings	0
10 wickets in match	0
Best bowling	1/14
Catches/stumpings	0/–
- Source: Cricinfo, 10 July 2019

Michael Robert Barnard (born 8 February 1990) is an English former first-class cricketer.

The son of the cricketer Andrew Barnard, he was born at Shrewsbury in February 1990. He was educated at Shrewsbury School, before going up to Oxford Brookes University. While studying at Oxford Brookes, he made a single appearance in first-class cricket for Oxford UCCE against Middlesex at Oxford in 2010. He took a single wicket in the match, dismissing Stuart Poynter in Middlesex's first-innings, to finish with match figures of 1 for 64. He batted once in the Oxford MCCU second-innings, when he was dismissed for a duck by Danny Evans. In addition to playing first-class cricket, he also played minor counties cricket for Shropshire from 2008–19, making eight appearances in the Minor Counties Championship, nineteen appearances in the MCCA Knockout Trophy, and two appearances in the Minor Counties T20. His brother, Ed, is also a first-class cricketer.
