= Ed Barnard =

English cricketer (born 1995)

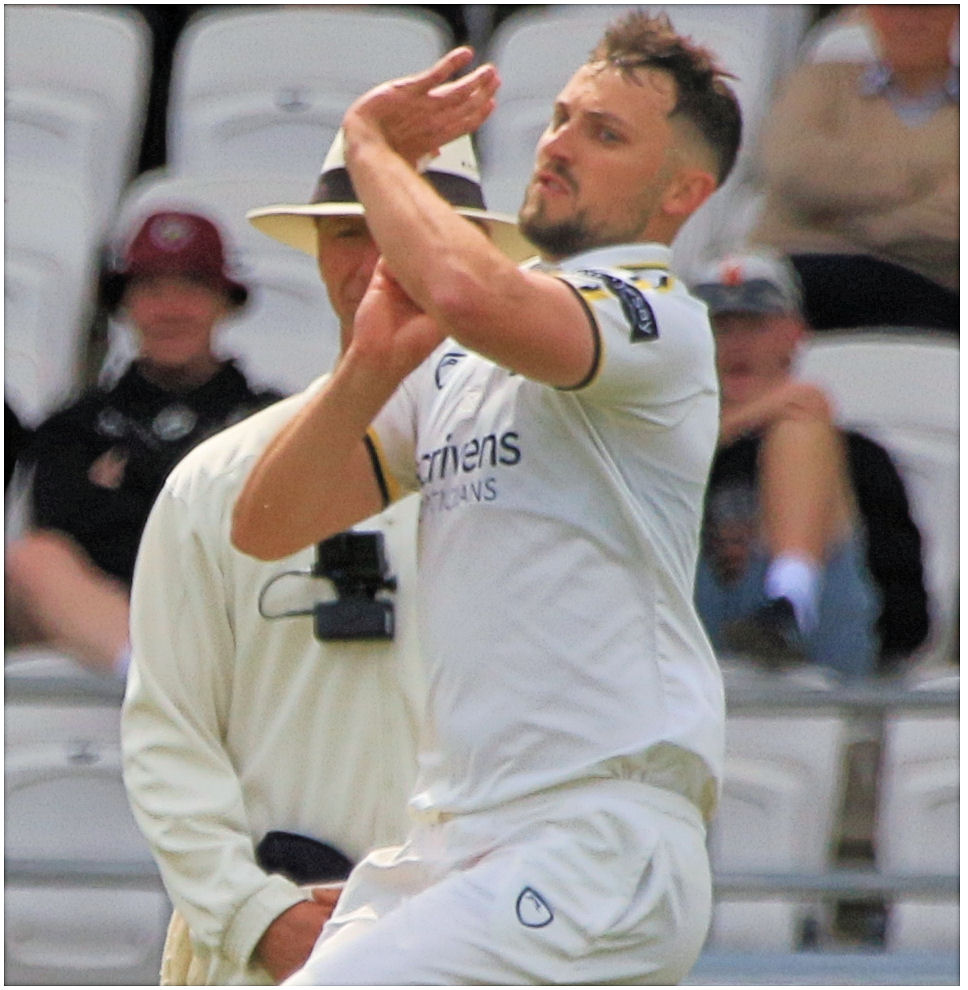
- Barnard in 2025

Personal information
- Full name: Edward George Barnard
- Born: 20 November 1995 (age 30); Shrewsbury, Shropshire, England
- Height: 6 ft 1 in (1.85 m)
- Batting: Right-handed
- Bowling: Right-arm fast-medium
- Relatives: Andrew Barnard (father); Mike Barnard (brother)

Domestic team information
- Years: Team
- 2015–2022: Worcestershire (squad no. 30)
- 2023–present: Warwickshire (squad no. 30)
- FC debut: 31 May 2015 Worcestershire v Hampshire
- LA debut: 30 July 2015 Worcestershire v Yorkshire

Career statistics
Competition	FC	LA	T20
Matches	148	87	143
Runs scored	6,676	2,468	1,359
Batting average	36.68	46.70	17.20
100s/50s	11/36	6/10	0/3
Top score	177*	173*	67
Balls bowled	21,102	3,639	1,773
Wickets	374	105	66
Bowling average	30.26	31.90	40.65
5 wickets in innings	8	0	0
10 wickets in match	1	0	0
Best bowling	6/37	4/21	3/29
Catches/stumpings	85/–	36/–	67/–
- Source: Cricinfo, 26 September 2026

Edward George Barnard (born 20 November 1995) is an English cricketer who plays for Warwickshire County Cricket Club. A batting all-rounder, he bowls right-arm fast-medium, and bats right-handed. He made his first-class debut for Worcestershire against Hampshire in May 2015. Barnard joined Warwickshire at the end of the 2022 season and signed a two-year contract extension in March 2025. He was named Warwickshire captain for all formats in March 2026. In his first season as captain, Warwickshire won the 2026 County Championship.

== Early life ==
Edward Barnard, known more commonly as "Ed" Barnard was born in Shrewsbury. Barnard played cricket at a young age at Shrewsbury School and Shrewsbury Cricket Club, where his father, Andrew, was first captain and then chairman. Barnard played with former Worcetershire teammate, Joe Clarke, when they were both young. His brother Mike Barnard, also played professionally for Shropshire County Cricket Club where his father Andrew also played. He supports Newcastle United.

== Career ==
Barnard progressed through Worcestershire's academy, playing for the under-19s side. He also played for England's under-19s, most notably making a century against South Africa national under-19's in the 2014 Under-19 Cricket World Cup. He made his first-class debut against Hampshire, picking up three wickets in both innings of the game. He continued to impress for Worcestershire claiming 47 wickets in the 2017 season and averaging 36.25 with the bat. He won the 2017 County championship division two title and T20 Blast 2018 whilst at the club.

After spending 15 years at Worcestershire, he left to join local rivals Warwickshire. It was reported he was offered better terms to stay at Worcestershire however he opted to signed a 3-year deal at Edgbaston. He was named Warwickshire captain for all formats in March 2026.

In his first season as captain, Warwickshire won the County Championship for the ninth time in their history.
