= Arron Lilley =

English cricketer

Personal information
- Full name: Arron Mark Lilley
- Born: 1 April 1991 (age 35); Ashton-under-Lyne, Greater Manchester, England
- Height: 6 ft 1 in (1.85 m)
- Batting: Right-handed
- Bowling: Right-arm off-break
- Role: All-rounder

Domestic team information
- Years: Team
- 2012–2018: Lancashire
- 2019–2023: Leicestershire
- First-class debut: 15 July 2013 Lancashire v Glamorgan
- List A debut: 27 August 2012 Lancashire v Worcestershire

Career statistics
Competition	FC	LA	T20
Matches	16	36	127
Runs scored	444	471	1,764
Batting average	29.60	19.62	20.27
100s/50s	0/2	0/1	0/5
Top score	63	60	99*
Balls bowled	2,721	852	1,268
Wickets	43	21	50
Bowling average	33.20	38.14	32.02
5 wickets in innings	2	0	0
10 wickets in match	0	0	0
Best bowling	5/23	4/30	3/26
Catches/stumpings	5/–	15/–	62/–
- Source: CricketArchive, 30 September 2023

Arron Mark Lilley (born 1 April 1991) is an English cricketer who most recently played for Leicestershire. He is a right-handed batsman and an off-break bowler.

== Club career ==
Lilley started his career with the reserve team of Lancashire. He scored 1,008 runs in the Huddersfield Cricket League and that led to his getting a professional contract in October 2012. On 15 July 2013, he made his First Class debut against Glamorgan.

On 5 September 2013, he was fined £100 by the Drakes League for disciplinary problems. He was given a one-week ban, suspended for a year.

After being released by Lancashire at the end of the 2018 season Lilley signed for Leicestershire on a two-year deal.
