= 2022 County Championship =

Cricket tournament

- Dates: 7 April 2022 – 29 September 2022
- Administrator: England and Wales Cricket Board
- Cricket format: First-class cricket (4 days)
- Tournament format: League system
- Champions: Surrey (21st title)
- Participants: 18
- Matches: 126
- Most runs: Keaton Jennings (1,233) (Div 1); Wayne Madsen (1,273) (Div 2)
- Most wickets: Simon Harmer (59) (Div 1); Toby Roland-Jones (67) (Div 2)

The 2022 County Championship (referred to as the LV= Insurance County Championship for sponsorship reasons) was the 122nd cricket County Championship season in England and Wales. The season began on 7 April and ended on 29 September 2022. Warwickshire were the defending champions.

In October 2021, the England and Wales Cricket Board (ECB) announced that the tournament would return to the format of two divisions, with ten teams in Division One, and eight teams in Division Two. The teams were placed into the division they qualified for following the 2019 County Championship, after the 2020 season was completely cancelled due to the COVID-19 pandemic. In January 2022, the ECB confirmed all the fixtures for the tournament, with the Bob Willis Trophy being scrapped.

On 28 April 2022, Ben Stokes was named as England's new Test captain, replacing Joe Root. On 6 May 2022, in Stokes' first match since becoming England's captain, he hit 17 sixes against Worcestershire, setting a new record for sixes hit in a single innings of a match in the County Championship. Stokes scored 161 runs from 88 balls, which included the fastest century in first-class cricket by a Durham player.

In May 2022, in the Division One match between Surrey and Kent, Surrey set a new first-class cricket record for the highest innings score without a batter scoring a century, when they made 671/9 declared. In the process, Surrey also equalled the first-class record of seven for batters making a half-century without going on to reach triple figures. In July 2022, in Kent's match against Warwickshire, Sam Billings set a new record for the most catches in a County Championship match with twelve. Also in July 2022, Sam Northeast scored the third-highest score in a County Championship match, with 410 not out for Glamorgan against Leicestershire.

== Teams ==
The teams were split based on the finishing positions in the 2019 season, the last before two seasons were affected by the COVID-19 pandemic. The following teams took part in the County Championship:

=== Division One ===
Team promoted from Division Two in 2019

Team	Primary home ground	Captain	Coach
Essex	County Ground, Chelmsford	(England) Tom Westley	(England) Anthony McGrath
Gloucestershire	County Ground, Bristol	(South Africa) Graeme van Buuren	(South Africa) Dale Benkenstein
Hampshire	Rose Bowl, Southampton	(England) James Vince	(South Africa) Adi Birrell
Kent	St Lawrence Ground, Canterbury	(England) Sam Billings	(England) Matt Walker
Lancashire	Old Trafford, Manchester	(South Africa) Dane Vilas	(England) Glen Chapple
Northamptonshire	County Ground, Northampton	(South Africa) Ricardo Vasconcelos	(England) John Sadler
Somerset	County Ground, Taunton	(England) Tom Abell	(England) Jason Kerr
Surrey	The Oval, London	(England) Rory Burns	(England) Gareth Batty (Interim)
Warwickshire	Edgbaston, Birmingham	(England) Will Rhodes	(England) Mark Robinson
Yorkshire	Headingley, Leeds	(England) Steve Patterson	(Barbados) Ottis Gibson

=== Division Two ===
Team relegated from Division One in 2019

Team	Primary home ground	Captain	Coach
Derbyshire	County Ground, Derby	(England) Billy Godleman	(South Africa) Mickey Arthur
Durham	Riverside Ground, Chester-le-Street	(England) Scott Borthwick	(New Zealand) James Franklin
Glamorgan	Sophia Gardens, Cardiff	(Wales) David Lloyd	(England) Matthew Maynard
Leicestershire	Grace Road, Leicester	(Netherlands) Colin Ackermann	(England) Paul Nixon
Middlesex	Lord's, London	(Australia) Peter Handscomb	(England) Richard Johnson
Nottinghamshire	Trent Bridge, Nottingham	(England) Steven Mullaney	(England) Peter Moores
Sussex	County Ground, Hove	(England) Tom Haines	(England) Ian Salisbury
Worcestershire	New Road, Worcester	(England) Brett D’Oliveira	(England) Alex Gidman

== Division One ==
=== April ===
7–10 April 2022
Scorecard

Essex	v	Kent
514 (158.5 overs); Matt Critchley 132 (179); Jackson Bird 3/85 (28 overs)		581 (187.3 overs); Ben Compton 129 (289); Matt Critchley 4/114 (46 overs)
68/1d (22 overs); Tom Westley 32* (51); Nathan Gilchrist 1/6 (4 overs)

Match drawn
County Ground, Chelmsford
Umpires: Nick Cook and Paul Pollard

- Kent won the toss and elected to field.
- Alastair Cook (Essex) scored his 70th century in first-class cricket.

7–10 April 2022
Scorecard

Somerset	v	Hampshire
180 (63.4 overs); James Hildreth 87 (129); Keith Barker 3/33 (14.4 overs)		428 (119.4 overs); Joe Weatherley 168 (281); Ben Green 3/31 (8.4 overs)
135 (50.2 overs); Tom Lammonby 32 (74); Mohammad Abbas 4/22 (10.2 overs)

Hampshire won by an innings and 113 runs
Rose Bowl, Southampton
Umpires: Neil Bainton and Nigel Llong

- Somerset won the toss and elected to bat.

7–10 April 2022
Scorecard

Gloucestershire	v	Northamptonshire
223 (70.4 overs); James Bracey 117 (209); Ben Sanderson 4/66 (25 overs)		288 (77.1 overs); Rob Keogh 113 (180); Ryan Higgins 4/68 (17 overs)
363 (107.2 overs); Ryan Higgins 139 (213); Ben Sanderson 5/66 (24.2 overs)		272/8 (81.5 overs); Rob Keogh 74 (101); Ryan Higgins 3/47 (22.5 overs)

Match drawn
County Ground, Northampton
Umpires: Tom Lungley and James Middlebrook

- Northamptonshire won the toss and elected to field.

7–10 April 2022
Scorecard

Surrey	v	Warwickshire
428/8d (136 overs); Ben Foakes 132* (263); Oliver Hannon-Dalby 4/78 (30 overs)		531 (170.5 overs); Michael Burgess 178 (221); Reece Topley 3/97 (33 overs)
43/0 (13.1 overs); Rory Burns 22* (44)

Match drawn
Edgbaston, Birmingham
Umpires: Tim Robinson and Steve O'Shaughnessy

- Surrey won the toss and elected to bat.

14–17 April 2022
Scorecard

Gloucestershire	v	Yorkshire
227 (78.1 overs); Marcus Harris 136 (231); Matthew Fisher 4/19 (14.1 overs)		376 (120.3 overs); Harry Brook 101 (164); Ajeet Singh Dale 4/72 (23.3 overs)
359 (117.2 overs); James Bracey 177 (331); Steven Patterson 4/43 (24.2 overs)		213/4 (49.1 overs); Dawid Malan 65 (65); Ajeet Singh Dale 2/30 (9 overs)

Yorkshire won by 6 wickets
County Ground, Bristol
Umpires: Ian Blackwell and Alex Wharf

- Yorkshire won the toss and elected to field.
- James Wharton (Yorkshire) made his first-class debut.

14–17 April 2022
Scorecard

Lancashire	v	Kent
506 (137 overs); Steven Croft 155 (336); Hamidullah Qadri 6/129 (37 overs)		260 (97.3 overs); Ben Compton 104* (289); Matt Parkinson 4/66 (31 overs)
36/0 (7.1 overs); George Balderson 23* (23)		279 (123.2 overs) (f/o); Ben Compton 115 (340); Hasan Ali 3/36 (21 overs)

Lancashire won by 10 wickets
St Lawrence Ground, Canterbury
Umpires: Neil Bainton and Martin Saggers

- Lancashire won the toss and elected to bat.
- Ben Compton (Kent) carried his bat.

14–17 April 2022
Scorecard

Somerset	v	Essex
109 (45.4 overs); Tom Lammonby 48 (120); Simon Harmer 3/14 (4.4 overs)		180 (79 overs); Alastair Cook 59 (125); Craig Overton 7/57 (25 overs)
154 (60.2 overs); Steven Davies 51 (100); Shane Snater 6/36 (14.2 overs)		84/9 (32 overs); Adam Rossington 29* (49); Craig Overton 6/30 (13 overs)

Essex won by 1 wicket
County Ground, Taunton
Umpires: Mike Burns and Russell Warren

- Essex won the toss and elected to field.

14–17 April 2022
Scorecard

Surrey	v	Hampshire
467 (142.1 overs); Ollie Pope 127 (215); Keith Barker 4/80 (27.1 overs)		223 (56.1 overs); Keith Barker 57 (68); Jamie Overton 5/54 (12.1 overs)
		227 (62.5 overs) (f/o); Joe Weatherley 87 (96); Jordan Clark 4/55 (13.5 overs)

Surrey won by an innings and 17 runs
The Oval, London
Umpires: David Millns and Tim Robinson

- Hampshire won the toss and elected to field.

21–24 April 2022
Scorecard

Kent	v	Hampshire
305 (106.2 overs); Daniel Bell-Drummond 149 (231); Keith Barker 6/53 (24 overs)		652/6d (147 overs); Liam Dawson 171 (268); Nathan Gilchrist 3/124 (29 overs)
296 (95 overs); Ben Compton 89 (194); Kyle Abbott 5/29 (16 overs)

Hampshire won by an innings and 51 runs
St Lawrence Ground, Canterbury
Umpires: Rob Bailey and Mark Newell

- Kent won the toss and elected to bat.

21–24 April 2022
Scorecard

Gloucestershire	v	Lancashire
252 (88 overs); Marcus Harris 67 (117); Hasan Ali 6/47 (17 overs)		556/7d (166 overs); Josh Bohannon 231 (467); Zafar Gohar 4/135 (65 overs)
247 (124.1 overs); Tom Lace 71 (201); Hasan Ali 3/49 (27.1 overs)

Lancashire won by an innings and 57 runs
Old Trafford Cricket Ground, Manchester
Umpires: Steve O'Shaughnessy and Richard Illingworth

- Gloucestershire won the toss and elected to bat.
- Josh Bohannon (Lancashire) scored his maiden double century in first-class cricket.

21–24 April 2022
Scorecard

Yorkshire	v	Northamptonshire
296 (78.3 overs); Harry Brook 84 (112); Gareth Berg 5/58 (17.3 overs)		204 (84.5 overs); Emilio Gay 65 (162); Jordan Thompson 4/54 (16.5 overs)
406/3d (95 overs); George Hill 151* (248); Luke Procter 1/37 (10 overs)		318/7 (119.4 overs); Will Young 96 (241); Matt Revis 3/57 (20.4 overs)

Match drawn
County Ground, Northampton
Umpires: Peter Hartley and David Millns

- Yorkshire won the toss and elected to bat.
- George Hill (Yorkshire) scored his maiden century in first-class cricket.

21–24 April 2022
Scorecard

Somerset	v	Surrey
337 (116.4 overs); Tom Abell 150* (298); Reece Topley 3/62 (26.4 overs)		308 (100 overs); Sam Curran 80 (124); Peter Siddle 6/51 (26 overs)
207 (66.2 overs); Tom Abell 53 (68); Jordan Clark 4/52 (21.2 overs)		239/7 (67.5 overs); Ryan Patel 102 (133); Jack Brooks 4/73 (18.5 overs)

Surrey won by 3 wickets
The Oval, London
Umpires: Paul Pollard and Martin Saggers

- Somerset won the toss and elected to bat.

21–24 April 2022
Scorecard

Essex	v	Warwickshire
168 (64.2 overs); Tom Westley 80 (176); Danny Briggs 4/31 (15.2 overs)		385 (121.2 overs); Michael Burgess 170 (217); Mark Steketee 4/130 (26.2 overs)
323 (107.5 overs); Simon Harmer 75* (156); Craig Miles 4/85 (22.5 overs)		110/0 (37.4 overs); Alex Davies 65* (131)

Warwickshire won by 10 wickets
Edgbaston, Birmingham
Umpires: Richard Kettleborough and Neil Mallender

- Essex won the toss and elected to bat.

28 April–1 May 2022
Scorecard

Northamptonshire	v	Essex
390 (141.4 overs); Luke Procter 113 (271); Shane Snater 3/56 (24 overs)		193 (79.5 overs); Shane Snater 79* (94); Ben Sanderson 4/32 (19 overs)
		328/9 (145 overs) (f/o); Paul Walter 93 (246); Rob Keogh 4/51 (33 overs)

Match drawn
County Ground, Chelmsford
Umpires: Nigel Llong and Tom Lungley

- Essex won the toss and elected to field.

28 April–1 May 2022
Scorecard

Surrey	v	Gloucestershire
603 (165.4 overs); Jamie Smith 234* (430); Matthew Taylor 3/85 (29 overs)		443/2 (120 overs); Chris Dent 207* (389); Colin de Grandhomme 1/53 (16 overs)

Match drawn
County Ground, Bristol
Umpires: Hassan Adnan and Mike Burns

- Gloucestershire won the toss and elected to field.
- No play was possible on day 4 due to rain.
- Jamie Smith (Surrey) scored his maiden double century in first-class cricket.
- Chris Dent (Gloucestershire) scored his 10,000th run in first-class cricket.

28 April–1 May 2022
Scorecard

Hampshire	v	Lancashire
246 (77 overs); Nick Gubbins 101* (212); Hasan Ali 5/45 (15 overs)		240 (71.4 overs); Tom Bailey 59 (84); Keith Barker 5/67 (20.4 overs)
344 (123.5 overs); Nick Gubbins 130 (303); James Anderson 3/36 (23 overs)		9/0 (6 overs); Luke Wells 5* (11)

Match drawn
Rose Bowl, Southampton
Umpires: Nick Cook and Rob White

- Hampshire won the toss and elected to bat.
- No play was possible on day 4 due to rain.

28 April–1 May 2022
Scorecard

Somerset	v	Warwickshire
458 (128.4 overs); Matt Renshaw 129 (192); Oliver Hannon-Dalby 5/89 (31.4 overs)		209 (65.1 overs); Sam Hain 54 (115); Josh Davey 3/30 (9.1 overs)
		167 (73.1 overs) (f/o); Sam Hain 43 (116); Jack Brooks 4/44 (16 overs)

Somerset won by an innings and 82 runs
County Ground, Taunton
Umpires: Rob Bailey and Alex Wharf

- Warwickshire won the toss and elected to field.

28 April–1 May 2022
Scorecard

Kent	v	Yorkshire
291 (86.4 overs); Daniel Bell-Drummond 109 (194); Haris Rauf 5/65 (14 overs)		571 (138.4 overs); Harry Brook 194 (265); Nathan Gilchrist 3/114 (22 overs)
393 (122.3 overs); Ben Compton 93 (220); Steven Patterson 5/54 (29.3 overs)

Match drawn
Headingley Cricket Ground, Leeds
Umpires: Steve O'Shaughnessy and Graham Lloyd

- Yorkshire won the toss and elected to field.

=== May ===
5–8 May 2022
Scorecard

Essex	v	Yorkshire
403 (156.3 overs); Paul Walter 141 (322); Dom Bess 3/82 (44 overs)		465 (144.2 overs); Harry Brook 123 (152); Shane Snater 3/62 (24.2 overs)
167/0d (59.4 overs); Alastair Cook 102* (183)

Match drawn
County Ground, Chelmsford
Umpires: Rob Bailey and Tim Robinson

- Yorkshire won the toss and elected to field.
- Paul Walter (Essex) scored his maiden century in first-class cricket.

5–8 May 2022
Scorecard

Hampshire	v	Gloucestershire
342 (108.2 overs); Felix Organ 107 (234); Graeme van Buuren 3/53 (14.2 overs)		179 (68 overs); Ryan Higgins 46 (72); Mohammad Abbas 6/45 (17 overs)
204 (59.2 overs); Aneurin Donald 89 (97); Mohammad Amir 3/33 (13 overs)		280 (114.4 overs); George Scott 77 (164); Mohammad Abbas 3/62 (26 overs)

Hampshire won by 87 runs
Rose Bowl, Southampton
Umpires: Ben Debenham and Martin Saggers

- Hampshire won the toss and elected to bat.

5–8 May 2022
Scorecard

Warwickshire	v	Lancashire
315 (113 overs); Dom Sibley 142* (329); Matt Parkinson 3/60 (21 overs)		361 (128.3 overs); Keaton Jennings 110 (264); Nathan McAndrew 4/85 (29 overs)
184/6 (80 overs); Rob Yates 55 (157); Matt Parkinson 3/64 (34 overs)

Match drawn
Old Trafford Cricket Ground, Manchester
Umpires: Nigel Llong and Graham Lloyd

- Warwickshire won the toss and elected to bat.
- Dom Sibley (Warwickshire) carried his bat.

5–8 May 2022
Scorecard

Surrey	v	Northamptonshire
401 (126.3 overs); Rory Burns 107 (259); Luke Procter 3/68 (23 overs)		194 (74.5 overs); Luke Procter 83* (196); Colin de Grandhomme 4/39 (14.5 overs)
		194 (57.5 overs) (f/o); Emilio Gay 51 (73); Gus Atkinson 3/26 (7.5 overs)

Surrey won by an innings and 5 runs
The Oval, London
Umpires: Nick Cook and Russell Warren

- Northamptonshire won the toss and elected to field.

12–15 May 2022
Scorecard

Somerset	v	Gloucestershire
591/7d (147 overs); Tom Abell 142 (246); Zak Chappell 2/91 (26 overs)		186 (76.4 overs); James Bracey 39 (73); Jack Leach 5/49 (25.4 overs)
		159 (56.1 overs) (f/o); Jacob Bethell 61 (98); Jack Leach 3/41 (20.1 overs)

Somerset won by an innings and 246 runs
County Ground, Bristol
Umpires: Nigel Llong and Paul Baldwin

- Gloucestershire won the toss and elected to field.

12–15 May 2022
Scorecard

Surrey	v	Kent
671/9d (173 overs); Ollie Pope 96 (184); Nathan Gilchrist 3/121 (27 overs)		230 (82.5 overs); Ollie Robinson 71 (147); Will Jacks 4/65 (30 overs)
		114/1 (41.2 overs) (f/o); Ben Compton 63* (125); Will Jacks 1/27 (12 overs)

Match drawn
County Cricket Ground, Beckenham
Umpires: Ben Debenham and Neil Bainton

- Surrey won the toss and elected to bat.
- Only 9.2 overs of play were possible on day 4 due to rain.

12–15 May 2022
Scorecard

Northamptonshire	v	Warwickshire
597/6d (154.1 overs); Ricardo Vasconcelos 156 (197); Nathan McAndrew 3/121 (35 overs)		568/4 (187.4 overs); Sam Hain 202* (494); Jack White 2/102 (33 overs)

Match drawn
Edgbaston, Birmingham
Umpires: Mike Burns and Peter Hartley

- Warwickshire won the toss and elected to field.

12–15 May 2022
Scorecard

Lancashire	v	Yorkshire
566/9d (167.1 overs); Keaton Jennings 238 (408); Dom Bess 3/151 (39 overs)		379 (126.5 overs); Joe Root 147 (218); Matt Parkinson 4/90 (38.5 overs)
		169/6 (78) (f/o); Harry Brook 82* (157); James Anderson 2/15 (17 overs)

Match drawn
Headingley Cricket Ground, Leeds
Umpires: Martin Saggers and Paul Pollard

- Yorkshire won the toss and elected to field.
- Dane Vilas (Lancashire) scored his 10,000th run in first-class cricket.

19–22 May 2022
Scorecard

Essex	v	Lancashire
391 (120.5 overs); Dan Lawrence 120 (207); Tom Bailey 3/61 (22 overs)		103 (40.5 overs); Phil Salt 44 (74); Sam Cook 4/18 (13 overs)
		232 (92.3 overs) (f/o); Dane Vilas 62 (103); Simon Harmer 5/89 (41 overs)

Essex won by an innings and 56 runs
Old Trafford Cricket Ground, Manchester
Umpires: Steve O'Shaughnessy and Peter Hartley

- Essex won the toss and elected to bat.

19–22 May 2022
Scorecard

Kent	v	Northamptonshire
519/9d (146.1 overs); Ben Compton 140 (294); Ben Sanderson 2/82 (28 overs)		430 (149.1 overs); Luke Procter 76 (200); Matt Quinn 3/82 (27 overs)
170/1 (48 overs); Ben Compton 68* (140); Ben Curran 1/31 (8 overs)

Match drawn
County Ground, Northampton
Umpires: Billy Taylor and Tom Lungley

- Northamptonshire won the toss and elected to field.

19–22 May 2022
Scorecard

Somerset	v	Hampshire
211 (78.4 overs); Craig Overton 44 (54); Kyle Abbott 3/60 (18 overs)		280 (87.3 overs); Aneurin Donald 57 (80); Craig Overton 4/57 (26 overs)
69 (25 overs); Steven Davies 19 (30); Keith Barker 6/27 (13 overs)		1/0 (0.4 overs); Felix Organ 1* (4)

Hampshire won by 10 wickets
County Ground, Taunton
Umpires: Ian Blackwell and Alex Wharf

- Somerset won the toss and elected to bat.
- Craig Overton (Somerset) took his 400th wicket in first-class cricket.

19–22 May 2022
Scorecard

Warwickshire	v	Yorkshire
244 (81.4 overs); Michael Burgess 96 (106); Steven Patterson 3/43 (20.4 overs)		450 (144.3 overs); Adam Lyth 145 (330); Nathan McAndrew 4/111 (34.3 overs)
252/3 (116 overs); Will Rhodes 111* (297); Jordan Thompson 3/54 (20 overs)

Match drawn
Headingley Cricket Ground, Leeds
Umpires: Nick Cook and Neil Pratt

- Warwickshire won the toss and elected to bat.

=== June ===
12–15 June 2022
Scorecard

Yorkshire	v	Hampshire
428 (122.2 overs); George Hill 131 (257); Brad Wheal 4/59 (24.2 overs)		410 (118.1 overs); Ben Brown 83 (158); Jordan Thompson 4/68 (17.1 overs)
178 (78.5 overs); Matt Revis 28* (73); Brad Wheal 3/32 (15.5 overs)		198/8 (45.2 overs); Liam Dawson 67 (68); Steven Patterson 2/40 (12 overs)

Hampshire won by 2 wickets
Rose Bowl, Southampton
Umpires: Mike Burns and Richard Kettleborough

- Yorkshire won the toss and elected to bat.

12–15 June 2022
Scorecard

Gloucestershire	v	Kent
438 (110.5 overs); Glenn Phillips 125 (157); Matt Milnes 4/93 (23 overs)		564 (163.2 overs); Jordan Cox 158 (264); Tom Price 5/58 (18 overs)
213 (67 overs); Glenn Phillips 59 (134); Jacob Duffy 5/66 (17 overs)		91/2 (22.4 overs); Ben Compton 30 (67); Glenn Phillips 1/8 (2.4 overs)

Kent won by 8 wickets
St Lawrence Ground, Canterbury
Umpires: Nigel Llong and Steve O'Shaughnessy

- Kent won the toss and elected to field.
- Tom Price (Gloucestershire) took a hat-trick and his maiden five-wicket haul in first-class cricket.

12–15 June 2022
Scorecard

Somerset	v	Surrey
180 (67.3 overs); Craig Overton 29 (57); Daniel Worrall 3/28 (16 overs)		382 (123 overs); Rory Burns 113 (217); Marchant de Lange 2/51 (17 overs)
394 (117.3 overs); Lewis Gregory 110* (190); Daniel Worrall 3/77 (30.3 overs)		195/7 (50 overs); Will Jacks 62 (80); Kasey Aldridge 4/61 (15 overs)

Surrey won by 3 wickets
County Ground, Taunton
Umpires: Ben Debenham and Neil Pratt

- Somerset won the toss and elected to bat.

12–15 June 2022
Scorecard

Warwickshire	v	Lancashire
292 (94.2 overs); Sam Hain 130 (228); Danny Lamb 3/43 (12 overs)		286 (97.1 overs); Steven Croft 90 (183); Liam Norwell 5/78 (23.1 overs)
327/9d (86 overs); Alex Davies 121 (221); Will Williams 4/70 (23 overs)		329/6 (95.3 overs); Luke Wells 175* (285); Oliver Hannon-Dalby 3/77 (25 overs)

Lancashire won by 4 wickets
Edgbaston, Birmingham
Umpires: Peter Hartley and Neil Mallender

- Warwickshire won the toss and elected to bat.

26–29 June 2022
Scorecard

Essex	v	Hampshire
238 (71.5 overs); Shane Snater 71 (73); Kyle Abbott 3/41 (19 overs)		163 (35.2 overs); Ben Brown 38 (63); Simon Harmer 8/46 (14.2 overs)
223 (63.5 overs); Simon Harmer 61 (99); Liam Dawson 7/68 (28.5 overs)		286 (65.3 overs); Felix Organ 65 (79); Simon Harmer 7/161 (32.3 overs)

Essex won by 12 runs
County Ground, Chelmsford
Umpires: Chris Watts and Martin Saggers
Player of the match: Simon Harmer (Essex)

- Essex won the toss and elected to bat.

26–29 June 2022
Scorecard

Gloucestershire	v	Lancashire
337 (110.1 overs); Chris Dent 110 (274); Jack Morley 4/91 (29 overs)		402 (132.2 overs); Keaton Jennings 94 (152); Ryan Higgins 3/55 (27 overs)
176/3 (61.1 overs); Miles Hammond 58* (129); Will Williams 1/24 (19 overs)

Match drawn
County Ground, Bristol
Umpires: Rob Bailey and Neil Pratt

- Gloucestershire won the toss and elected to bat.

26–29 June 2022
Scorecard

Northamptonshire	v	Warwickshire
451 (103 overs); Rob Keogh 130 (155); Oliver Hannon-Dalby 4/84 (24 overs)		405 (145.4 overs); Dom Sibley 102 (273); Jack White 4/66 (28 overs)
273/4 (71.2 overs); Luke Procter 144* (204); Michael Burgess 1/17 (6.2 overs)

Match drawn
County Ground, Northampton
Umpires: Neil Bainton and Alex Wharf

- Northamptonshire won the toss and elected to bat.

26–29 June 2022
Scorecard

Surrey	v	Kent
673/7d (129.2 overs); Sam Curran 126 (75); Toby Pettman 2/102 (22 overs)		331 (103 overs); Daniel Bell-Drummond 102 (202); Tom Lawes 4/51 (13 overs)
361/4 (117 overs); Daniel Bell-Drummond 107* (195); Sam Curran 2/43 (15 overs)

Match drawn
The Oval, London
Umpires: Mike Burns and James Middlebrook

- Kent won the toss and elected to field.
- Sam Curran (Surrey) scored his maiden century in first-class cricket.

=== July ===
11–14 July 2022
Scorecard

Gloucestershire	v	Essex
136 (39 overs); Graeme van Buuren 34 (37)stu Simon Harmer 5/44 (15 overs)		310 (111.4 overs); Alastair Cook 145 (311); Zafar Gohar 5/84 (31.4 overs)
252 (58 overs); Zafar Gohar 81 (75); Simon Harmer 8/112 (27 overs)		79/1 (17 overs); Nick Browne 43* (55); Ryan Higgins 1/25 (4 overs)

Essex won by 9 wickets
County Ground, Chelmsford
Umpires: Paul Baldwin and Paul Pollard

- Gloucestershire won the toss and elected to bat.

11–14 July 2022
Scorecard

Warwickshire	v	Hampshire
217 (70.5 overs); Nathan McAndrew 63 (109); Kyle Abbott 5/45 (18.5 overs)		370/9d (111 overs); Ian Holland 99 (203); Oliver Hannon-Dalby 5/86 (31 overs)
243 (111.5 overs); Michael Burgess 58 (123); Keith Barker 4/35 (22 overs)		91/2 (16.5 overs); Felix Organ 41 (36); George Garrett 1/16 (3 overs)

Hampshire won by 8 wickets
Rose Bowl, Southampton
Umpires: Steve O'Shaughnessy and Russell Warren

- Warwickshire won the toss and elected to bat.

11–14 July 2022
Scorecard

Northamptonshire	v	Kent
303 (93.3 overs); Emilio Gay 112 (195); Matt Milnes 3/47 (15 overs)		335 (109.2 overs); Jordan Cox 72 (174); Jack White 4/62 (25 overs)
396/d (100 overs); Ryan Rickelton 133 (257); George Linde 3/43 (12 overs)		161 (74.5 overs); Zak Crawley 35 (66); Rob Keogh 5/31 (21.5 overs)

Northamptonshire won by 203 runs
St Lawrence Ground, Canterbury
Umpires: Rob Bailey and Rob White

- Northamptonshire won the toss and elected to bat.

11–14 July 2022
Scorecard

Somerset	v	Lancashire
446 (135.1 overs); Lewis Goldsworthy 130 (262); Will Williams 3/85 (31 overs)		624/9d (149.2 overs); Keaton Jennings 318 (426); Roelof van der Merwe 5/174 (40.2 overs)
213/7 (94 overs); Lewis Goldsworthy 73* (213); Jack Morley 5/69 (35.1 overs)

Match drawn
Trafalgar Road Ground, Southport
Umpires: Peter Hartley and James Middlebrook

- Somerset won the toss and elected to bat.
- Lewis Goldsworthy (Somerset) scored his maiden century in first-class cricket.
- Keaton Jennings (Lancashire) scored his maiden triple century in first-class cricket.
- Roelof van der Merwe (Somerset) took his maiden five-wicket haul in first-class cricket.

11–14 July 2022
Scorecard

Yorkshire	v	Surrey
521 (134.2 overs); Adam Lyth 183 (306); Tom Lawes 4/51 (13.2 overs)		515 (129 overs); Rory Burns 132 (260); Dom Bess 5/126 (35 overs)
220 (64.5 overs); Matthew Waite 59 (77); Jamie Overton 6/61 (17.5 overs)		228/6 (43.3 overs); Ben Foakes 42* (41); Shannon Gabriel 2/18 (3 overs)

Surrey won by 4 wickets
North Marine Road, Scarborough
Umpires: Chris Watts and Tom Lungley

- Yorkshire won the toss and elected to bat.
- Will Luxton (Yorkshire) made his first-class debut.

19–22 July 2022
Scorecard

Hampshire	v	Gloucestershire
457 (126.2 overs); Felix Organ 118 (251); Ryan Higgins 2/72 (26 overs)		201 (64.2 overs); Ollie Price 59 (129); Liam Dawson 4/44 (15 overs)
82/4 (9.3 overs); James Vince 24 (16); Ryan Higgins 3/41 (5 overs)		337 (98.2 overs) (f/o); Miles Hammond 169 (278); Kyle Abbott 6/76 (19.2 overs)

Hampshire won by 6 wickets
College Ground, Cheltenham
Umpires: Nick Cook and Graham Lloyd

- Hampshire won the toss and elected to bat.
- Kyle Abbott (Hampshire) took a hat-trick.

19–22 July 2022
Scorecard

Northamptonshire	v	Lancashire
235 (76.3 overs); Lewis McManus 61 (88); Washington Sundar 5/76 (22 overs)		132 (57.2 overs); Josh Bohannon 31 (99); Jack White 5/14 (13 overs)
174 (60.1 overs); Ryan Rickelton 59* (81); Will Williams 5/41 (19.1 overs)		278/6 (86.2 overs); Josh Bohannon 103 (168); Ben Sanderson 3/76 (24 overs)

Lancashire won by 4 wickets
County Ground, Northampton
Umpires: Ben Debenham and Neil Pratt

- Northamptonshire won the toss and elected to bat.
- Jack White (Northamptonshire) took his maiden five-wicket haul in first-class cricket.

19–22 July 2022
Scorecard

Somerset	v	Yorkshire
424 (121.4 overs); Tom Abell 116 (239); Dom Bess 4/68 (29 overs)		276 (95.2 overs); Tom Kohler-Cadmore 100 (201); Kasey Aldridge 3/23 (16.2 overs)
225/6 (51 overs); George Bartlett 88* (110); Dom Bess 3/70 (21 overs)

Match drawn
County Ground, Taunton
Umpires: Tom Lungley and Hassan Adnan

- Somerset won the toss and elected to bat.
- No play was possible on day 4 due to rain.

19–22 July 2022
Scorecard

Essex	v	Surrey
271 (84 overs); Adam Rossington 100 (151); Daniel Worrall 6/56 (19 overs)		319 (97.5 overs); Will Jacks 150* (184); Shane Snater 3/35 (21 overs)
208 (63.5 overs); Nick Browne 48 (101); Daniel Worrall 5/66 (17.5 overs)		162/4 (57.4 overs); Rory Burns 40 (91); Simon Harmer 2/38 (15.4 overs)

Surrey won by 6 wickets
The Oval, London
Umpires: Neil Bainton and Peter Hartley

- Essex won the toss and elected to bat.

19–22 July 2022
Scorecard

Kent	v	Warwickshire
165 (40.1 overs); Jordan Cox 48 (69); Oliver Hannon-Dalby 6/40 (13 overs)		225 (85.1 overs); Sam Hain 99 (215); Navdeep Saini 5/72 (18 overs)
384/9d (110 overs); Joe Denly 141 (269); Danny Briggs 3/54 (15 overs)		147 (39.5 overs); Dom Sibley 33 (74); Matt Milnes 4/11 (6.5 overs)

Kent won by 177 runs
Edgbaston, Birmingham
Umpires: Michael Gough and Ian Blackwell

- Warwickshire won the toss and elected to field.

25–28 July 2022
Scorecard

Essex	v	Somerset
505/9d (163 overs); Nick Browne 234* (454); Tom Lammonby 3/35 (12 overs)		605/6d (176.5 overs); Matt Renshaw 146 (313); Simon Harmer 2/123 (57 overs)
30/1 (17 overs); Tom Westley 15* (43); Peter Siddle 1/10 (5 overs)

Match drawn
County Ground, Chelmsford
Umpires: Nick Cook and Chris Watts

- Essex won the toss and elected to bat.
- Tom Banton (Somerset) scored his maiden century in first-class cricket.
- James Rew (Somerset) scored his maiden century in first-class cricket.

25–28 July 2022
Scorecard

Gloucestershire	v	Northamptonshire
317 (81.2 overs); Chris Dent 54 (96); Rob Keogh 3/61 (16 overs)		479 (144.1 overs); Ryan Rickelton 95 (173); Zafar Gohar 5/134 (42 overs)
363/9d (101 overs); Graeme van Buuren 127* (187); Tom Taylor 5/49 (15 overs)		205/8 (33.4 overs); Ryan Rickelton 68 (47); Zafar Gohar 5/62 (13 overs)

Northamptonshire won by 2 wickets
College Ground, Cheltenham
Umpires: Hassan Adnan and Ben Debenham

- Gloucestershire won the toss and elected to bat.

25–28 July 2022
Scorecard

Lancashire	v	Kent
145 (45.2 overs); Luke Wells 35 (80); Matt Henry 5/45 (18 overs)		270 (87 overs); Jack Leaning 90 (209); Tom Bailey 6/64 (23 overs)
436/9d (118 overs); Josh Bohannon 134 (239); Matt Henry 4/82 (27 overs)		127 (52.2 overs); Daniel Bell-Drummond 69* (151); Tom Bailey 5/46 (16.2 overs)

Lancashire won by 184 runs
Old Trafford Cricket Ground, Manchester
Umpires: Graham Lloyd and Neil Pratt

- Kent won the toss and elected to field.

25–28 July 2022
Scorecard

Warwickshire	v	Surrey
253 (104.4 overs); Nathan McAndrew 44 (101); Tom Lawes 3/38 (20.4 overs)		316 (80.1 overs); Ollie Pope 65 (73); Oliver Hannon-Dalby 3/44 (18.1 overs)
310 (102.5 overs); Sam Hain 96 (200); Kemar Roach 5/72 (26 overs)		252/4 (60.4 overs); Hashim Amla 80* (113); Danny Briggs 2/65 (14 overs)

Surrey won by 6 wickets
The Oval, London
Umpires: Nigel Llong and Billy Taylor

- Surrey won the toss and elected to field.

25–28 July 2022
Scorecard

Yorkshire	v	Hampshire
159 (56.1 overs); Dom Bess 67 (105); Kyle Abbott 6/36 (12.1 overs)		218 (51.2 overs); Ben Brown 53 (76); Jordan Thompson 5/60 (15.2 overs)
272 (111.1 overs); Jonny Tattersall 63 (140); Kyle Abbott 4/77 (27 overs)		214/3 (59.4 overs); Felix Organ 72 (127); Ben Coad 2/31 (13 overs)

Hampshire won by 7 wickets
North Marine Road, Scarborough
Umpires: Peter Hartley and Neil Mallender

- Yorkshire won the toss and elected to bat.

=== September ===
5–8 September 2022
Scorecard

Hampshire	v	Northamptonshire
400/9d (90 overs); Aneurin Donald 94 (84); Ben Sanderson 3/68 (23 overs)		175 (64 overs); Luke Procter 40 (119); Kyle Abbott 4/52 (19 overs)
		221 (70.3 overs) (f/o); Emilio Gay 74 (129); Mohammad Abbas 4/32 (17 overs)

Hampshire won by an innings and 4 runs
Rose Bowl, Southampton
Umpires: David Millns and Steve O'Shaughnessy

- Northamptonshire won the toss and elected to field.

5–8 September 2022
Scorecard

Essex	v	Kent
573 (160.2 overs); Feroze Khushi 164 (228); Daniel Bell-Drummond 3/37 (10 overs)		164 (50.2 overs); Jordan Cox 34 (55); Ben Allison 4/40 (12 overs)
		149 (62.4 overs) (f/o); Jordan Cox 65 (137); Sam Cook 7/33 (19 overs)

Essex won by an innings and 260 runs
St Lawrence Ground, Canterbury
Umpires: Mike Burns and Ben Debenham

- Kent won the toss and elected to field.

5–8 September 2022
Scorecard

Lancashire	v	Yorkshire
276 (100.2 overs); Keaton Jennings 119 (236); George Hill 6/26 (16 overs)		255 (105.3 overs); Tom Kohler-Cadmore 51 (139); Tom Bailey 4/56 (24 overs)
280/5d (43 overs); Luke Wells 124 (82); Dom Bess 3/84 (13 overs)		102/3 (63.2 overs); Tom Kohler-Cadmore 34* (159); Tom Hartley 2/27 (18 overs)

Match drawn
Old Trafford Cricket Ground, Manchester
Umpires: Russell Warren and Alex Wharf

- Lancashire won the toss and elected to bat.
- Finlay Bean (Yorkshire) made his first-class debut.

5–8 September 2022
Scorecard

Gloucestershire	v	Somerset
343 (102.1 overs); Marcus Harris 159 (263); Lewis Gregory 4/62 (16.1 overs)		248 (81.3 overs); Imam-ul-Haq 90 (162); Tom Price 5/75 (21.3 overs)
279/7d (96 overs); Ben Charlesworth 64 (207); Josh Davey 2/42 (14 overs)		11/0 (3.5 overs); Tom Lammonby 6* (15)

Match drawn
County Ground, Taunton
Umpires: Nigel Llong and Tom Lungley

- Somerset won the toss and elected to field.

12–15 September 2022
Scorecard

Northamptonshire	v	Surrey
339 (89.1 overs); Emilio Gay 145 (189); Kemar Roach 5/95 (20 overs)		421 (104.3 overs); Hashim Amla 133 (278); Rob Keogh 4/51 (13.3 overs)
426 (121.2 overs); Saif Zaib 124 (204); Daniel Worrall 3/69 (21 overs)		48/1 (20.3 overs); Ryan Patel 32* (70)

Match drawn
County Ground, Northampton
Umpires: Peter Hartley and Graham Lloyd

- Surrey won the toss and elected to field.
- Tom Curran (Surrey) scored his maiden century in first-class cricket.

12–15 September 2022
Scorecard

Somerset	v	Warwickshire
219 (65.4 overs); Lewis Gregory 60 (97); Mohammed Siraj 5/82 (24 overs)		196 (81.2 overs); Sam Hain 67 (166); Jack Brooks 4/40 (18 overs)
340/7d (121 overs); George Bartlett 111 (228); Danny Briggs 2/75 (22 overs)		256/6 (74 overs); Alex Davies 58 (95); Jack Brooks 2/28 (13 overs)

Match drawn
Edgbaston, Birmingham
Umpires: Neil Mallender and James Middlebrook

- Somerset won the toss and elected to bat.

12–15 September 2022
Scorecard

Yorkshire	v	Essex
134 (52.2 overs); George Hill 36 (76); Sam Cook 3/31 (15 overs)		225 (73.2 overs); Dan Lawrence 61 (145); Jordan Thompson 4/60 (14 overs)
252 (77.4 overs); Ben Coad 69 (70); Jamie Porter 4/64 (19.4 overs)		162/9 (48.1 overs); Shane Snater 65* (51); Steven Patterson 5/46 (16 overs)

Essex won by 1 wicket
Headingley Cricket Ground, Leeds
Umpires: Rob Bailey and Rob White

- Essex won the toss and elected to field.

20–23 September 2022
Scorecard

Lancashire	v	Essex
131 (39.5 overs); Tom Bailey 24* (23); Simon Harmer 5/41 (11.5 overs)		107 (39.1 overs); Alastair Cook 40 (98); Tom Bailey 5/36 (11.1 overs)
73 (23.4 overs); George Bell 24 (28); Shane Snater 6/10 (8 overs)		59 (22.2 overs); Alastair Cook 14 (22); George Balderson 5/14 (7 overs)

Lancashire won by 38 runs
County Ground, Chelmsford
Umpires: Richard Kettleborough and David Millns

- Lancashire won the toss and elected to bat.
- George Bell (Lancashire) made his first-class debut.

20–23 September 2022
Scorecard

Kent	v	Hampshire
165 (65.4 overs); Ben Compton 63 (161); Kyle Abbott 4/46 (14 overs)		57 (16.5 overs); Ian Holland 19 (34); Matt Quinn 6/23 (6.5 overs)
269 (71.5 overs); Jack Leaning 112 (178); Mohammad Abbas 4/68 (18.5 overs)		300 (85 overs); James Fuller 78* (92); Nathan Gilchrist 4/60 (19 overs)

Kent won by 77 runs
Rose Bowl, Southampton
Umpires: Rob Bailey and Nigel Llong

- Hampshire won the toss and elected to field.

20–23 September 2022
Scorecard

Surrey	v	Yorkshire
333 (80.5 overs); Ollie Pope 136 (131); Steven Patterson 4/69 (20 overs)		179 (58.4 overs); Tom Kohler-Cadmore 55 (75); Tom Lawes 4/31 (12 overs)
55/0 (6 overs); Rory Burns 30* (16)		208 (65.3 overs) (f/o); Adam Lyth 46 (99); Daniel Worrall 4/61 (15.3 overs)

Surrey won by 10 wickets
The Oval, London
Umpires: Russell Warren and Alex Wharf

- Yorkshire won the toss and elected to field.

20–23 September 2022
Scorecard

Warwickshire	v	Gloucestershire
274 (104.2 overs); Dom Sibley 120* (280); Zafar Gohar 5/64 (35 overs)		255 (74.3 overs); Jack Taylor 71 (106); Jayant Yadav 5/90 (29.3 overs)
128 (38.5 overs); Alex Davies 60 (90); Tom Price 8/27 (13.5 overs)		149/7 (48.2 overs); Chris Dent 64 (145); Jayant Yadav 4/47 (20.2 overs)

Gloucestershire won by 3 wickets
County Ground, Bristol
Umpires: Peter Hartley and Rob White

- Warwickshire won the toss and elected to bat.
- Dom Sibley (Warwickshire) carried his bat.

20–23 September 2022
Scorecard

Somerset	v	Northamptonshire
389 (137.3 overs); Tom Abell 111 (179); Rob Keogh 4/99 (30.3 overs)		265 (77.2 overs); Will Young 85 (153); Craig Overton 5/38 (17.2 overs)
337/4d (75 overs); Tom Abell 115 (98); Ben Sanderson 2/53 (16 overs)		109 (30.4 overs); Tom Taylor 25 (23); Josh Davey 3/25 (10 overs)

Somerset won by 352 runs
County Ground, Taunton
Umpires: Graham Lloyd and Neil Pratt

- Somerset won the toss and elected to bat.

26–29 September 2022
Scorecard

Somerset	v	Kent
202 (63.5 overs); Lewis Goldsworthy 94 (155); Nathan Gilchrist 6/61 (19.5 overs)		492 (106.5 overs); Hamidullah Qadri 87 (91); Kasey Aldridge 6/110 (24.5 overs)
139 (40.4 overs); Sajid Khan 40 (19); Matt Quinn 3/14 (11 overs)

Kent won by an innings and 151 runs
St Lawrence Ground, Canterbury
Umpires: Ben Debenham and Paul Pollard

- Somerset won the toss and elected to bat.

26–29 September 2022
Scorecard

Gloucestershire	v	Yorkshire
190 (57.2); James Bracey 71 (112); Matthew Fisher 4/45 (12 overs)		183 (57.4 overs); Tom Kohler-Cadmore 46 (45); Zafar Gohar 5/40 (14 overs)
233 (76.2 overs); Oliver Price 68 (179); George Hill 2/12 (6.2 overs)		222 (69.2 overs); Dom Bess 79* (103); David Payne 4/51 (18.2 overs)

Gloucestershire won by 18 runs
Headingley, Leeds
Umpires: Ian Blackwell and James Middlebrook

- Gloucestershire won the toss and elected to bat.

26–29 September 2022
Scorecard

Warwickshire	v	Hampshire
272/4d (70 overs); Rob Yates 104 (185); Ian Holland 3/85 (15 overs)		311 (81.5 overs); James Vince 98 (150); Liam Norwell 4/38 (16.5 overs)
177 (39.2 overs); Dom Sibley 77 (101); James Fuller 4/34 (9 overs)		133 (43.5 overs); Nick Gubbins 46 (104); Liam Norwell 9/62 (18.5 overs)

Warwickshire won by 5 runs
Edgbaston, Birmingham
Umpires: Richard Kettleborough and Russell Warren

- Hampshire won the toss and elected to field.

26–29 September 2022
Scorecard

Lancashire	v	Surrey
512 (124.1 overs); Keaton Jennings 199 (276); Dan Moriarty 5/163 (37.1 overs)		209 (79.2 overs); Cameron Steel 47 (163); Tom Hartley 3/28 (9.2 overs)
		173 (73.1 overs) (f/o); Rory Burns 61 (79); Tom Hartley 5/32 (29 overs)

Lancashire won by an innings and 130 runs
Old Trafford, Manchester
Umpires: Mike Burns and Martin Saggers

- Lancashire won the toss and elected to bat.
- Tom Hartley (Lancashire) took his maiden five-wicket haul in first-class cricket

26–29 September 2022
Scorecard

Essex	v	Northamptonshire
263 (82 overs); Ben Allison 69* (114); Tom Taylor 4/59 (16 overs)		163 (68.1 overs); Will Young 37 (91); Ben Allison 5/32 (15. overs)
110 (48.5 overs); Matt Critchley 20 (59); Jack White 6/38 (17 overs)		163 (45.3 overs); Gareth Berg 39 (46); Simon Harmer 6/49 (15.3 overs)

Essex won by 47 runs
County Ground, Northampton
Umpires: Peter Hartley and Steve O'Shaughnessy

- Northamptonshire won the toss and elected to field.

== Division Two ==
=== April ===
7–10 April 2022
Scorecard

Glamorgan	v	Durham
234 (72.5 overs); Colin Ingram 87 (152); Ben Raine 3/35 (18 overs)		383 (115 over); Alex Lees 182* (358); Andrew Salter 7/45 (12 overs)
220/5 (68 overs); Chris Cooke 85* (144); Chris Rushworth 2/38 (17 overs)

Match drawn
Sophia Gardens, Cardiff
Umpires: Ian Blackwell and Russell Warren

- Durham won the toss and elected to field.
- Alex Lees (Durham) carried his bat.
- Andrew Salter (Glamorgan) took his maiden five-wicket haul in first-class cricket.

7–10 April 2022
Scorecard

Worcestershire	v	Leicestershire
348 (93.3 overs); Brett D'Oliveira 118* (235); Chris Wright 3/53 (25 overs)		213 (70 overs); Lewis Hill 93 (114); Joe Leach 4/37 (17 overs)
234/5d (42.5 overs); Ed Pollock 112 (122); Ben Mike 4/27 (4.5 overs)		218/9 (96 overs); Hassan Azad 104* (280); Josh Baker 4/51 (30 overs)

Match drawn
Grace Road, Leicester
Umpires: Neil Mallender and Chris Watts

- Worcestershire won the toss and elected to bat.
- Ed Pollock (Worcestershire) scored his maiden century in first-class cricket.

7–10 April 2022
Scorecard

Middlesex	v	Derbyshire
401 (125 overs); Stephen Eskinazi 118 (216); Alex Thomson 4/103 (32.5 overs)		304 (116.4 overs); Shan Masood 91 (152); Tom Helm 3/52 (25 overs)
258/5d (50 overs); Max Holden 82 (91); Sam Conners 3/61 (12 overs)		255/5 (83 overs); Shan Masood 62 (68); Tom Helm 3/49 (19.4 overs)

Match drawn
Lord's, London
Umpires: Richard Illingworth and Richard Kettleborough

- Derbyshire won the toss and elected to field.
- Tim Murtagh (Middlesex) took his 900th wicket in first-class cricket.

7–10 April 2022
Scorecard

Sussex	v	Nottinghamshire
375 (127.1 overs); Tom Clark 100 (187); Liam Patterson-White 5/84 (45.1 overs)		534/9d (143 overs); Steven Mullaney 192 (279); Steven Finn 3/84 (28 overs)
172 (78 overs); Ali Orr 45 (161); Brett Hutton 3/39 (17 overs)		14/0 (2.1 overs); Haseeb Hameed 12* (6)

Nottinghamshire won by 10 wickets
County Ground, Hove
Umpires: Rob Bailey and Martin Saggers

- Nottinghamshire won the toss and elected to field.
- Tom Clark (Sussex) scored his maiden century in first-class cricket.
- Joey Evison (Nottinghamshire) scored his maiden century in first-class cricket.

14–17 April 2022
Scorecard

Derbyshire	v	Sussex
505/8d (133 overs); Shan Masood 239 (340); Henry Crocombe 3/131 (29 overs)		174 (56.3 overs); Tom Haines 41 (34); Nick Potts 3/43 (10 overs)
		513/3 (176.1 overs) (f/o); Tom Haines 243 (491); Sam Conners 1/67 (22 overs)

Match drawn
County Ground, Derby
Umpires: Paul Baldwin and Peter Hartley

- Derbyshire won the toss and elected to bat.
- Nick Potts (Derbyshire) made his first-class debut.
- Shan Masood (Derbyshire) scored his maiden double century in first-class cricket.
- Tom Haines (Sussex) scored his maiden double century in first-class cricket.
- Tom Haines and Cheteshwar Pujara (Sussex) became the first batters to score double centuries in the same innings of a first-class match while following-on.

14–17 April 2022
Scorecard

Durham	v	Leicestershire
428 (125 overs); David Bedingham 191 (256); Ed Barnes 3/101 (28.4 overs)		273 (110.5 overs); Colin Ackermann 81 (182); Matty Potts 6/58 (27 overs)
239/2d (50 overs); Michael Jones 108 (141); George Rhodes 1/64 (15 overs)		183/2 (80 overs); Sam Evans 77* (254); Liam Trevaskis 1/13 (13 overs)

Match drawn
Riverside Ground, Chester-le-Street
Umpires: Ben Debenham and Steve O'Shaughnessy

- Leicestershire won the toss and elected to field.
- Oli Gibson (Durham) made his first-class debut.
- Matty Potts (Durham) took his maiden five-wicket haul in first-class cricket.
- Michael Jones (Durham) scored his maiden century in first-class cricket.

14–17 April 2022
Scorecard

Nottinghamshire	v	Glamorgan
302 (88.1 overs); Ben Duckett 122 (207); Michael Neser 3/56 (17.1 overs)		379 (107.5 overs); Sam Northeast 85 (162); Joey Evison 3/67 (16 overs)
242 (96.5 overs); Ben Duckett 95 (178); Timm van der Gugten 4/60 (25 overs)		166/3 (45 overs); Marnus Labuschagne 50* (93); Dane Paterson 1/29 (13 overs)

Glamorgan won by 7 wickets
Trent Bridge, Nottingham
Umpires: Richard Illingworth and Chris Watts

- Glamorgan won the toss and elected to field.

21–24 April 2022
Scorecard

Durham	v	Nottinghamshire
230 (78.4 overs); Sean Dickson 54 (95); Liam Patterson-White 5/54 (26.4 overs)		488/9d (153 overs); Ben Slater 225* (445); Matty Potts 6/107 (35 overs)
117 (33.5 overs); Scott Borthwick 25 (60); James Pattinson 3/34 (8.5 overs)

Nottinghamshire won by an innings and 141 runs
Riverside Ground, Chester-le-Street
Umpires: Graham Lloyd and Tom Lungley

- Nottinghamshire won the toss and elected to field.
- Lyndon James (Nottinghamshire) scored his maiden century in first-class cricket.
- Ben Slater (Nottinghamshire) scored his maiden double century in first-class cricket.

21–24 April 2022
Scorecard

Glamorgan	v	Middlesex
122 (41.1 overs); Chris Cooke 31 (68); Toby Roland-Jones 3/34 (13 overs)		336 (104.2 overs); John Simpson 104* (246); James Harris 4/68 (20 overs)
132 (46.5 overs); Michael Neser 27 (32); Toby Roland-Jones 5/40 (17 overs)

Middlesex won by an innings and 82 runs
Sophia Gardens, Cardiff
Umpires: Mike Burns and Rob White

- Middlesex won the toss and elected to field.

21–24 April 2022
Scorecard

Leicestershire	v	Derbyshire
213 (77.2 overs); Sam Evans 63 (147); Sam Conners 4/62 (22 overs)		531 (141.5 overs); Shan Masood 219 (268); Ed Barnes 5/101 (25 overs)
250 (117.1 overs); Louis Kimber 54 (163); Alex Thomson 3/50 (39 overs)

Derbyshire won by an innings and 68 runs
Grace Road, Leicester
Umpires: Neil Bainton and Neil Pratt

- Leicestershire won the toss and elected to bat.
- Shan Masood became the first batter for Derbyshire to score back-to-back double centuries in first-class cricket.
- Mattie McKiernan (Derbyshire) scored his maiden century in first-class cricket.
- Ed Barnes (Leicestershire) took his maiden five-wicket haul in first-class cricket.

21–24 April 2022
Scorecard

Worcestershire	v	Sussex
491 (136.5 overs); Brett D'Oliveira 169* (333); Tom Haines 3/50 (19 overs)		269 (81.5 overs); Cheteshwar Pujara 109 (206); Joe Leach 4/60 (17 overs)
		188 (63 overs) (f/o); Grant Stewart 67* (58); Josh Baker 3/75 (24 overs)

Worcestershire won by an innings and 34 runs
New Road, Worcester
Umpires: James Middlebrook and Alex Wharf

- Worcestershire won the toss and elected to bat.

28 April–1 May 2022
Scorecard

Derbyshire	v	Glamorgan
368 (126.2 overs); Brooke Guest 109 (251); Michael Hogan 4/55 (26 overs)		387 (101.4 overs); Marnus Labuschagne 130 (199); Suranga Lakmal 5/82 (29.4 overs)
349/3d (89.1 overs); Brooke Guest 138 (242); Timm van der Gugten 1/17 (6.1 overs)		310/8 (54.5 overs); Marnus Labuschagne 85 (87); Ryan Sidebottom 4/50 (14 overs)

Match drawn
County Ground, Derby
Umpires: Paul Pollard and Neil Pratt

- Derbyshire won the toss and elected to bat.

28 April–1 May 2022
Scorecard

Leicestershire	v	Middlesex
149 (56.5 overs); Callum Parkinson 25* (69); Tom Helm 3/23 (12 overs)		370 (110.2 overs); Mark Stoneman 108 (165); Ben Mike 4/15 (7 overs)
272 (76.5 overs); Ben Mike 99* (108); Toby Roland-Jones 3/67 (19.5 overs)		52/0 (10.3 overs); Mark Stoneman 30* (32)

Middlesex won by 10 wickets
Lord's, London
Umpires: David Millns and Mark Newell

- Middlesex won the toss and elected to field.

28 April–1 May 2022
Scorecard

Worcestershire	v	Nottinghamshire
159 (41 overs); Jack Haynes 37 (64); Dane Paterson 8/52 (15 overs)		266 (59.5 overs); Haseeb Hameed 53 (56); Adam Finch 3/59 (11.5 overs)
339 (121.2 overs); Ed Barnard 163* (310); Luke Fletcher 4/65 (28 overs)		233/5 (56 overs); Ben Duckett 78 (85); Charlie Morris 2/34 (12 overs)

Nottinghamshire won by 5 wickets
Trent Bridge, Nottingham
Umpires: Neil Bainton and Peter Hartley

- Nottinghamshire won the toss and elected to field.

28 April–1 May 2022
Scorecard

Durham	v	Sussex
223 (73.5 overs); Liam Trevaskis 88 (116); Tom Clark 3/21 (17 overs)		538 (153.5 overs); Cheteshwar Pujara 203 (334); Liam Trevaskis 5/128 (35.5 overs)
364/3d (113 overs); Sean Dickson 186 (290); Mason Crane 2/110 (33 overs)

Match drawn
County Ground, Hove
Umpires: Ben Debenham and Ian Blackwell

- Durham won the toss and elected to bat.

=== May ===
5–8 May 2022
Scorecard

Leicestershire	v	Glamorgan
320 (107.5 overs); Rishi Patel 82 (164); Marnus Labuschagne 3/65 (17 overs)		437 (118.4 overs); Kiran Carlson 91 (135); Chris Wright 3/83 (27 overs)
266 (86.2 overs); Ben Mike 64 (100); Michael Hogan 3/33 (13.2 overs)		153/4 (40.4 overs); Sam Northeast 40* (87); Callum Parkinson 3/38 (17 overs)

Glamorgan won by 6 wickets
Sophia Gardens, Cardiff
Umpires: Rob White and Alex Wharf

- Glamorgan won the toss and elected to field.
- Andy Gorvin (Glamorgan) made his first-class debut.

5–8 May 2022
Scorecard

Sussex	v	Middlesex
392 (106.4 overs); Tom Alsop 113 (179); Martin Andersson 3/88 (24 overs)		358 (102.2 overs); Luke Hollman 82 (148); Ollie Robinson 5/66 (24 overs)
335/4d (68 overs); Cheteshwar Pujara 170* (197); Shaheen Afridi 1/43 (12 overs)		370/3 (73.5 overs); Sam Robson 149 (181); Ollie Robinson 2/51 (14 overs)

Middlesex won by 7 wickets
County Ground, Hove
Umpires: Ian Blackwell and Chris Watts

- Sussex won the toss and elected to bat.

5–8 May 2022
Scorecard

Durham	v	Worcestershire
580/6d (128 overs); Ben Stokes 161 (88); Ben Gibbon 2/94 (25 overs)		309 (99.5 overs); Joe Leach 62 (105); Matty Potts 6/62 (24 overs)
170/1d (21.3 overs); Sean Dickson 105 (73); Adam Finch 1/16 (1.3 overs)		262/3 (100 overs); Jack Haynes 120* (276); Chris Rushworth 3/43 (24 overs)

Match drawn
New Road, Worcester
Umpires: Paul Baldwin and Richard Illingworth

- Durham won the toss and elected to bat.
- Ben Gibbon (Worcestershire) made his first-class debut.
- Jack Haynes (Worcestershire) scored his maiden century in first-class cricket.

12–15 May 2022
Scorecard

Worcestershire	v	Derbyshire
368 (114.1 overs); Jack Haynes 133 (207); Sam Conners 5/109 (31 overs)		565/8d (153 overs); Anuj Dal 114 (177); Ed Barnard 3/65 (24 overs)
252/2d (101 overs); Jake Libby 105* (306); Suranga Lakmal 1/41 (15 overs)

Match drawn
County Ground, Derby
Umpires: Graham Lloyd and Rob White

- Derbyshire won the toss and elected to field.

12–15 May 2022
Scorecard

Durham	v	Glamorgan
311 (84.3 overs); Ben Stokes 82 (110); Michael Hogan 4/67 (16.3 overs)		365 (89 overs); Billy Root 88 (148); Matty Potts 4/61 (20 overs); Ben Raine 4/61 (20 overs)
244 (86.2 overs); Scott Borthwick 90 (124); Michael Neser 4/57 (21.2 overs)		137 (53.5 overs); Marnus Labuschagne 31 (46); Matty Potts 7/40 (18.5 overs)

Durham won by 58 runs
Riverside Ground, Chester-le-Street
Umpires: Alex Wharf and James Middlebrook

- Glamorgan won the toss and elected to field.

12–15 May 2022
Scorecard

Leicestershire	v	Sussex
210 (83.4 overs); Lewis Hill 35 (36); Henry Crocombe 3/37 (18 overs)		450 (126.3 overs); Tom Clark 138 (262); Callum Parkinson 3/98 (29 overs)
333/9 (136 overs); Rishi Patel 68 (209); Archie Lenham 4/84 (29 overs)

Match drawn
Grace Road, Leicester
Umpires: Tom Lungley and Neil Mallender

- Leicestershire won the toss and elected to bat.

12–15 May 2022
Scorecard

Nottinghamshire	v	Middlesex
415 (120.2 overs); Haseeb Hameed 112 (217); Toby Roland-Jones 4/64 (32 overs)		195 (64.5 overs); Peter Handscomb 48 (89); James Pattinson 4/49 (17 overs)
295/5d (60 overs); Steven Mullaney 100* (58); Luke Hollman 3/77 (13 overs)		133/3 (58.2 overs); Sam Robson 101* (180); Luke Fletcher 2/9 (14 overs)

Match drawn
Lord's, London
Umpires: Nick Cook and Mark Newell

- Middlesex won the toss and elected to field.

19–22 May 2022
Scorecard

Durham	v	Middlesex
350 (122 overs); Liam Trevaskis 80* (156); Toby Roland-Jones 4/72 (25 overs)		422 (113.2 overs); Sam Robson 84 (160); Ben Stokes 4/72 (21.2 overs)
188 (63 overs); Scott Borthwick 60 (111); Toby Roland-Jones 6/35 (18 overs)		119/4 (26.3 overs); Peter Handscomb 39* (50); Liam Trevaskis 2/28 (9 overs)

Middlesex won by 6 wickets
Lord's, London
Umpires: Nigel Llong and Martin Saggers

- Middlesex won the toss and elected to field.

19–22 May 2022
Scorecard

Derbyshire	v	Nottinghamshire
260 (90.3 overs); Leus du Plooy 57 (121); Dane Paterson 3/36 (16.3 overs)		358 (89.2 overs); Ben Duckett 86 (114); Nick Potts 4/50 (15.2 overs)
262 (93 overs); Wayne Madsen 52 (75); Dane Paterson 3/35 (21 overs)		167/0 (36.3 overs); Haseeb Hameed 93* (96)

Nottinghamshire won by 10 wickets
Trent Bridge, Nottingham
Umpires: Neil Mallender and David Millns

- Nottinghamshire won the toss and elected to field.

19–22 May 2022
Scorecard

Leicestershire	v	Worcestershire
148 (52.2 overs); Chris Wright 27* (28); Ed Barnard 3/45 (14.2 overs)		577/6d (138 overs); Azhar Ali 225 (350); Wiaan Mulder 4/125 (30 overs)
170 (58 overs); Lewis Hill 50 (66); Matthew Waite 4/35 (14 overs)

Worcestershire won by an innings and 259 runs
New Road, Worcester
Umpires: Paul Pollard and Russell Warren

- Worcestershire won the toss and elected to field.
- Rehan Ahmed (Leicestershire) made his first-class debut.

=== June ===
12–15 June 2022
Scorecard

Middlesex	v	Derbyshire
251 (85.5 overs); Luke Hollman 48 (96); Toby Pettman 3/40 (14.5 overs)		229 (66.5 overs); Wayne Madsen 62 (89); Toby Roland-Jones 5/45 (17 overs)
196 (72.5 overs); Mark Stoneman 67 (138); Luis Reece 3/26 (16.5 overs)		222/4 (54.4 overs); Shan Masood 98 (113); Tim Murtagh 2/29 (11 overs)

Derbyshire won by 6 wickets
Queen's Park, Chesterfield
Umpires: Hassan Adnan and Tim Robinson

- Middlesex won the toss and elected to bat.

12–15 June 2022
Scorecard

Durham	v	Worcestershire
642/7d (155 overs); Rachin Ravindra 217 (318); Ben Gibbon 4/127 (6 overs)		550 (178.5 overs); Ed Barnard 128 (253); Ben Raine 4/76 (38 overs)
102/0d (30 overs); Michael Jones 50* (91)

Match drawn
Riverside Ground, Chester-le-Street
Umpires: James Middlebrook and Mark Newell

- Durham won the toss and elected to bat.
- Jonathan Bushnell (Durham) made his first-class debut.
- Rachin Ravindra (Durham) scored his maiden double century in first-class cricket.
- Paul Coughlin (Durham) scored his maiden century in first-class cricket.
- Ben Raine (Durham) scored his maiden century in first-class cricket.

12–15 June 2022
Scorecard

Sussex	v	Glamorgan
376 (119.4 overs); Oli Carter 185 (289); Andrew Salter 4/107 (41.4 overs)		494 (131.3 overs); Colin Ingram 178 (272); Henry Crocombe 4/84 (22 overs)
258 (86.5 overs); Oli Carter 83 (172); Michael Neser 3/58 (21.5 overs)		141/5 (39.1 overs); Sam Northeast 45* (86); Jack Brooks 2/22 (11 overs)

Glamorgan won by 5 wickets
Sophia Gardens, Cardiff
Umpires: Billy Taylor and Rob White

- Glamorgan won the toss and elected to field.
- Oli Carter (Sussex) scored his maiden century in first-class cricket.

12–15 June 2022
Scorecard

Leicestershire	v	Nottinghamshire
440 (116.3 overs); Colin Ackermann 116 (253); Liam Patterson-White 3/45 (16 overs)		548 (108.3 overs); Ben Duckett 145 (153); Wiaan Mulder 3/102 (22.3 overs)
99 (45 overs); Hassan Azad 34 (72); Liam Patterson-White 4/15 (13 overs)

Nottinghamshire won by an innings and 9 runs
Grace Road, Leicester
Umpires: Russell Warren and Chris Watts

- Nottinghamshire won the toss and elected to field.

26–29 June 2022
Scorecard

Nottinghamshire	v	Middlesex
551/8d (132.3 overs); Lyndon James 155 (249); Luke Hollman 4/122 (25.3 overs)		376 (117.2 overs); John Simpson 92 (184); James Pattinson 4/65 (22.2 overs)
		261/1 (100 overs) (f/o); Mark Stoneman 109* (296); Ben Duckett 1/15 (7 overs)

Match drawn
Trent Bridge, Nottingham
Umpires: Paul Baldwin and Ben Debenham

- Nottinghamshire won the toss and elected to bat.

26–29 June 2022
Scorecard

Derbyshire	v	Sussex
551/8d (151 overs); Wayne Madsen 176 (263); Delray Rawlins 3/129 (31 overs)		337 (94.4 overs); Mohammad Rizwan 130* (227); Hayden Kerr 3/63 (18.4 overs)
127/7d (41 overs); Luis Reece 42* (85); Jack Brooks 5/46 (10 overs)		345/5 (73.1 overs); Ali Orr 144 (203); Luis Reece 2/47 (9 overs)

Sussex won by 5 wickets
County Ground, Hove
Umpires: Hassan Adnan and Graham Lloyd

- Derbyshire won the toss and elected to bat.

26–29 June 2022
Scorecard

Worcestershire	v	Glamorgan
271 (84.4 overs); Ed Barnard 131 (182); Michael Neser 3/40 (17.4 overs)		139 (44.3 overs); Eddie Byrom 57 (131); Joe Leach 6/44 (13 overs)
199 (71.4 overs); Jake Libby 49 (140); Michael Neser 4/50 (19 overs)		334/7 (111.1 overs); Colin Ingram 102 (203); Charlie Morris 2/39 (17 overs)

Glamorgan won by 3 wickets
New Road, Worcester
Umpires: Tom Lungley and Steve O'Shaughnessy

- Glamorgan won the toss and elected to field.

=== July ===
11–14 July 2022
Scorecard

Derbyshire	v	Durham
283 (92.1 overs); Leus du Plooy 123* (234); Chris Rushworth 7/45 (21 overs)		296 (85.2 over); Tom Mackintosh 51 (100); Toby Pettman 3/40 (19 overs)
398/8d (115 overs); Leus du Plooy 134 (206); Chris Rushworth 4/62 (24 overs)		221/7 (83.4 overs); Alex Lees 41 (65); Anuj Dal 2/22 (10 overs)

Match drawn
Riverside Ground, Chester-le-Street
Umpires: Neil Mallender and Ian Blackwell

- Durham won the toss and elected to field.
- Tom Mackintosh and Stanley McAlindon (Durham) both made their first-class debuts.

11–14 July 2022
Scorecard

Glamorgan	v	Nottinghamshire
318 (84.2 overs); Sam Northeast 56 (84); Brett Hutton 4/76 (17 overs)		285 (86 overs); Matt Montgomery 80 (166); Michael Hogan 4/47 (20 overs)
421/5d (101.3 overs); Eddie Byrom 144 (204); Liam Patterson-White 2/116 (26 overs)		259/4 (95.4 overs); Joe Clarke 95 (155); Kiran Carlson 1/17 (4.4 overs)

Match drawn
Sophia Gardens, Cardiff
Umpires: Hassan Adnan and Mark Newell

- Nottinghamshire won the toss and elected to field.

11–14 July 2022
Scorecard

Middlesex	v	Worcestershire
188 (59.1 overs); Luke Hollman 62 (110); Joe Leach 3/58 (14 overs)		191 (58.5 overs); Ed Barnard 69* (96); Toby Roland-Jones 4/60 (14.5 overs)
240 (80.3 overs); Luke Hollman 46 (86); Dillon Pennington 3/54 (19 overs)		238/3 (46.4 overs); Ed Pollock 113 (77); Umesh Yadav 1/25 (9 overs)

Worcestershire won by 7 wickets
Merchant Taylors' School Ground, Northwood
Umpires: Neil Bainton and Jack Shantry

- Middlesex won the toss and elected to bat.

11–14 July 2022
Scorecard

Sussex	v	Leicestershire
588 (142.5 overs); Tom Alsop 150 (243); Callum Parkinson 5/128 (41.5 overs)		756/4d (177 overs); Colin Ackermann 277* (375); Steven Finn 3/108 (33 overs)
220/1 (42 overs); Ali Orr 106* (123); Colin Ackermann 1/27 (10 overs)

Match drawn
County Ground, Hove
Umpires: Neil Pratt and Ben Debenham

- Sussex won the toss and elected to bat.
- Colin Ackermann and Wiaan Mulder (Leicestershire) both scored their maiden double centuries in first-class cricket.
- Leicestershire made their highest total in a first-class cricket match.

19–22 July 2022
Scorecard

Nottinghamshire	v	Derbyshire
618/8d (134 overs); Ben Duckett 241 (273); Ben Aitchison 3/119 (25 overs)		318 (111.5 overs); Brooke Guest 109 (267); Luke Fletcher 3/44 (25 overs)
		249/4 (97 overs) (f/o); Luis Reece 86 (237); Dane Paterson 2/62 (20 overs)

Match drawn
County Ground, Derby
Umpires: James Middlebrook and Paul Pollard

- Nottinghamshire won the toss and elected to bat.

19–22 July 2022
Scorecard

Sussex	v	Middlesex
523 (162.3 overs); Cheteshwar Pujara 231 (403); Tom Helm 5/109 (31.2 overs)		485 (124.5 overs); John Simpson 109 (225); Brad Currie 6/93 (27 overs)
181/9 (78 overs); Aristides Karvelas 57 (97); Tom Helm 4/37 (18 overs)

Match drawn
Lord's, London
Umpires: Mark Newell and Rob White

- Middlesex won the toss and elected to field.
- Brad Currie (Sussex) made his first-class debut.

20–23 July 2022
Scorecard

Leicestershire	v	Glamorgan
584 (148 overs); Wiaan Mulder 156 (201); Andrew Salter 4/158 (42 overs)		795/5d (160 overs); Sam Northeast 410* (450); Chris Wright 3/99 (27 overs)
183 (59.4 overs); Wiaan Mulder 59 (92); Michael Hogan 4/43 (14 overs)

Glamorgan won by an innings and 28 runs
Grace Road, Leicester
Umpires: Nigel Llong and Paul Baldwin

- Leicestershire won the toss and elected to bat.
- Roman Walker (Leicestershire) made his first-class debut.
- Sam Northeast (Glamorgan) scored his maiden double century and his maiden triple century in first-class cricket.
- Sam Northeast went on to become the first batter to score 400 runs in a first-class innings since Brian Lara made 400 not out for the West Indies against England in April 2004.

25–28 July 2022
Scorecard

Durham	v	Middlesex
421/7d (126.3 overs); Michael Jones 206 (381); Toby Roland-Jones 4/67 (28.3 overs)		455 (128.1 overs); John Simpson 132 (195); Ben Raine 3/73 (24.1 overs)
142/3 (55 overs); Scott Borthwick 34* (104); Tom Helm 2/21 (10 overs)

Match drawn
Riverside Ground, Chester-le-Street
Umpires: James Middlebrook and Paul Pollard

- Middlesex won the toss and elected to field.
- Michael Jones (Durham) scored his maiden double century in first-class cricket.
- Chris Rushworth (Durham) took his 600th wicket in first-class cricket.

25–28 July 2022
Scorecard

Derbyshire	v	Worcestershire
130 (51.1 overs); Anuj Dal 55 (112); Dillon Pennington 4/36 (12 overs)		185 (45.1 overs); Kashif Ali 52 (74); Ben Aitchison 4/40 (15 overs)
343 (104.5 overs); Anuj Dal 112* (217); Dillon Pennington 3/70 (21 overs)		190 (64.1 overs); Gareth Roderick 53* (126); Anuj Dal 5/40 (15 overs)

Derbyshire won by 98 runs
New Road, Worcester
Umpires: Ian Blackwell and Mark Newell

- Worcestershire won the toss and elected to field.
- Kashif Ali (Worcestershire) made his first-class debut.

26–29 July 2022
Scorecard

Nottinghamshire	v	Sussex
240 (61.4 overs); Steven Mullaney 70 (109); Ollie Robinson 4/44 (16 overs)		143 (45.2 overs); Cheteshwar Pujara 49 (85); Dane Paterson 5/43 (15.2 overs)
301 (84.1 overs); Haseeb Hameed 94 (115); Ollie Robinson 5/60 (20.1 overs)		142 (47.3 overs); Cheteshwar Pujara 46* (75); Dane Paterson 3/14 (12.3 overs)

Nottinghamshire won by 256 runs
Trent Bridge, Nottingham
Umpires: Neil Bainton and Paul Baldwin

- Sussex won the toss and elected to field.

=== September ===
5–8 September 2022
Scorecard

Derbyshire	v	Durham
306 (95.2 overs); Leus du Plooy 82 (124); Chris Rushworth 3/60 (21 overs)		223 (79 overs); Michael Jones 87 (152); Sam Conners 4/55 (16 overs)
214/9d (79 overs); Wayne Madsen 58 (85); Ben Raine 5/43 (22 overs)		176/5 (53 overs); Liam Trevaskis 42* (57); Mark Watt 2/37 (13 overs)

Match drawn
County Ground, Derby
Umpires: Hassan Adnan and Nick Cook

- Durham won the toss and elected to field.

5–8 September 2022
Scorecard

Worcestershire	v	Glamorgan
454/9d (138 overs); Gareth Roderick 172* (348); Timm van der Gugten 4/81 (30 overs)		295 (85.3 overs); Shubman Gill 92 (148); Dillon Pennington 4/78 (22.3 overs)
		5/0 (1.3 overs) (f/o); David Lloyd 4* (7)

Match drawn
Sophia Gardens, Cardiff
Umpires: Paul Baldwin and Billy Taylor

- Worcestershire won the toss and elected to bat.

5–8 September 2022
Scorecard

Nottinghamshire	v	Leicestershire
201 (61.3 overs); Matt Montgomery 43 (86); Chris Wright 3/26 (15 overs)		93 (29.5 overs); Sam Evans 50* (71); Luke Fletcher 4/23 (9 overs)
390/7d (82.3 overs); Joe Clarke 67 (72); Ed Barnes 2/83 (13.3 overs)		257 (84.4 overs); Michael Finan 58 (46); Steven Mullaney 3/29 (11 overs)

Nottinghamshire won by 241 runs
Trent Bridge, Nottingham
Umpires: Richard Illingworth and Neil Pratt

- Leicestershire won the toss and elected to field.
- Michael Finan (Leicestershire) made his first-class debut.

12–15 September 2022
Scorecard

Leicestershire	v	Durham
202 (56 overs); Sol Budinger 64 (72); Matthew Potts 6/52 (19 overs)		296 (91 overs); Michael Jones 97 (157); Callum Parkinson 3/56 (18 overs)
198 (63.5 overs); Louis Kimber 75 (142); Matthew Potts 7/49 (19.5 overs)		108/3 (23.5 overs); Michael Jones 50 (58); Michael Finan 2/54 (9.5 overs)

Durham won by 7 wickets
Grace Road, Leicester
Umpires: Tom Lungley and Chris Watts

- Durham won the toss and elected to field.
- Sol Budinger (Leicestershire) made his first-class debut.

12–15 September 2022
Scorecard

Glamorgan	v	Middlesex
214 (54.1 overs); Chris Cooke 52 (83); Ryan Higgins 4/59 (15.1 overs)		390 (112.1 overs); Mark Stoneman 128 (203); James Harris 5/90 (29.1 overs)
220 (74.5 overs); David Lloyd 70 (92); Toby Roland-Jones 5/61 (21.5 overs)		45/0 (5.2 overs); Sam Robson 25* (15)

Middlesex won by 10 wickets
Lord's, London
Umpires: David Millns and Mark Newell

- Middlesex won the toss and elected to field.

12–15 September 2022
Scorecard

Sussex	v	Worcestershire
220 (59.2 overs); Jack Carson 58 (74); Joe Leach 4/37 (13 overs)		438/5d (100 overs); Jake Libby 215 (294); Jack Carson 2/40 (20 overs)
312/6 (95 overs); Tom Alsop 137* (228); Dillon Pennington 2/54 (16 overs)

Match drawn
County Ground, Hove
Umpires: Hassan Adnan and Nigel Llong

- Sussex won the toss and elected to bat.

20–23 September 2022
Scorecard

Middlesex	v	Leicestershire
297 (98 overs); John Simpson 92 (177); Michael Finan 5/58 (18 overs)		294 (98.2 overs); Harry Swindells 67 (180); Toby Roland-Jones 4/70 (27.2 overs)
271 (69 overs); Max Holden 91 (112); Callum Parkinson 4/69 (26 overs)		194 (68.3 overs); Colin Ackermann 80 (156); Toby Roland-Jones 4/50 (19 overs)

Middlesex won by 80 runs
Grace Road, Leicester
Umpires: Nick Cook and Steve O'Shaughnessy

- Leicestershire won the toss and elected to field.

20–23 September 2022
Scorecard

Worcestershire	v	Nottinghamshire
390 (118.3 overs); Gareth Roderick 102 (208); Jake Ball 3/60 (21 overs)		128 (34.2 overs); Haseeb Hameed 37 (92); Ed Barnard 4/26 (6 overs)
		183 (52.2 overs) (f/o); Haseeb Hameed 58 (102); Matthew Waite 3/34 (9.2 overs)

Worcestershire won by an innings and 79 runs
New Road, Worcester
Umpires: Ben Debenham and James Middlebrook

- Nottinghamshire won the toss and elected to field.

20–23 September 2022
Scorecard

Sussex	v	Durham
162 (59.4 overs); Ali Orr 36 (82); Paul Coughlin 3/33 (15 overs)		459/7d (103 overs); Michael Jones 96 (193); James Coles 3/91 (19 overs)
157 (48.3 overs); Tom Haines 37 (62); Ben Raine 5/54 (18 overs)

Durham won by an innings and 140 runs
Riverside Ground, Chester-le-Street
Umpires: Neil Mallender and Surendiran Shanmugam

- Durham won the toss and elected to field.
- Charlie Tear (Sussex) made his first-class debut.

20–23 September 2022
Scorecard

Glamorgan	v	Derbyshire
550/5d (135.2 overs); David Lloyd 313* (398); Anuj Dal 2/67 (21.3 overs)		253 (112.4 overs); Anuj Dal 92 (212); Ajaz Patel 5/68 (38.4 overs)
		273 (83.4 overs) (f/o); Wayne Madsen 77 (163); Timm van der Gugten 3/41 (13.4 overs)

Glamorgan won by an innings and 24 runs
Sophia Gardens, Cardiff
Umpires: Ian Blackwell and Billy Taylor

- Derbyshire won the toss and elected to field.
- Tom Bevan (Glamorgan) and Adam Sylvester (Derbyshire) both made their first-class debuts.

26–29 September 2022
Scorecard

Worcestershire	v	Middlesex
225 (82.5 overs); Brett D'Oliveira 44 (137); Toby Roland-Jones 4/50 (25.5 overs)		509 (145.3 overs); Stephen Eskinazi 115 (208); Jake Libby 2/10 (10.3 overs)

Match drawn
New Road, Worcester
Umpires: Rob Bailey and Nick Cook

- Middlesex won the toss and elected to field.

26–29 September 2022
Scorecard

Glamorgan	v	Sussex
533/9d (106.2 overs); Chris Cooke 141 (165); Sean Hunt 3/84 (23.2 overs)		258 (62.4 overs); Tom Haines 108* (169); Timm van der Gugten 3/56 (13.4 overs)
		554/8d (106.2 overs) (f/o); Ali Orr 198 (174); Andrew Salter 5/138 (54 overs)

Match drawn
County Ground, Hove
Umpires: Paul Baldwin and Tom Lungley

- Glamorgan won the toss and elected to bat.

26–29 September 2022
Scorecard

Nottinghamshire	v	Durham
662/5d (161.5 overs); Matt Montgomery 178 (353); Matthew Potts 3/83 (35 overs)		207 (57.4 overs); Matthew Potts 40 (36); Dane Paterson 3/50 (15.4 overs)
121/2d (30.2 overs); Haseeb Hameed 49* (87); Matthew Potts 1/14 (6 overs)		114 (38.5 overs); Chris Benjamin 33 (42); Stuart Broad 3/36 (10 overs)

Nottinghamshire won by 462 runs
Trent Bridge, Nottingham
Umpires: Mark Newell and Neil Pratt

- Nottinghamshire won the toss and elected to bat.

26–29 September 2022
Scorecard

Leicestershire	v	Derbyshire
249 (75 overs); Tom Scriven 53 (74); Sam Conners 5/51 (17 overs)		568/9d (165.2 overs); Billy Godleman 158 (328); Rehan Ahmed 5/114 (28.2 overs)
405/7 (108 overs); Rehan Ahmed 122 (113); Sam Conners 2/85 (27 overs)

Match drawn
County Ground, Derby
Umpires: Hassan Adnan and Jack Shantry

- Derbyshire won the toss and elected to field.

== Standings ==
Teams in both divisions will play a total of 14 games, with seven home matches and seven away matches. There is a two-up, two-down promotion and relegation system.

Teams receive 16 points for a win and 8 for a draw or tie. Bonus points (a maximum of 5 batting points and 3 bowling points) may be scored during the first 110 overs of each team's first innings.

=== Division One ===
Pos	Team	Pld	W	L	T	D	Bat	Bowl	Ded	Pts	
1	Surrey (C)	14	8	1	0	5	48	34	0	250	Champions
2	Lancashire	14	7	1	0	6	32	39	6	225	
3	Hampshire	14	9	4	0	1	37	37	2	224	
4	Essex	14	7	3	0	4	24	34	0	202	
5	Kent	14	4	5	0	5	30	27	3	158	
6	Northamptonshire	14	2	5	0	7	31	35	0	154	
7	Somerset	14	3	6	0	5	28	33	0	149	
8	Warwickshire	14	2	6	0	6	26	36	1	141	
9	Yorkshire (R)	14	1	6	0	7	33	35	2	138	Relegation to Division 2
10	Gloucestershire (R)	14	2	8	0	4	26	29	5	114	Relegation to Division 2

Source: CricketArchive, ESPNCricinfo, ECB
(C) Champion; (R) Relegated

=== Division Two ===
Pos	Team	Pld	W	L	T	D	Bat	Bowl	Ded	Pts	
1	Nottinghamshire (C, P)	14	8	2	0	4	45	40	4	241	Promotion to Division 1
2	Middlesex (P)	14	6	2	0	6	45	36	0	225	Promotion to Division 1
3	Glamorgan	14	6	3	0	5	43	37	0	216	
4	Worcestershire	14	4	3	0	7	38	36	0	194	
5	Derbyshire	14	3	3	0	8	37	36	0	185	
6	Durham	14	3	3	0	8	41	32	11	174	
7	Sussex	14	1	6	0	7	35	29	6	130	
8	Leicestershire	14	0	9	0	5	26	28	1	93	

Source: CricketArchive, ESPNCricinfo, ECB
(C) Champion; (P) Promoted
