= Nick Potts =

English cricketer

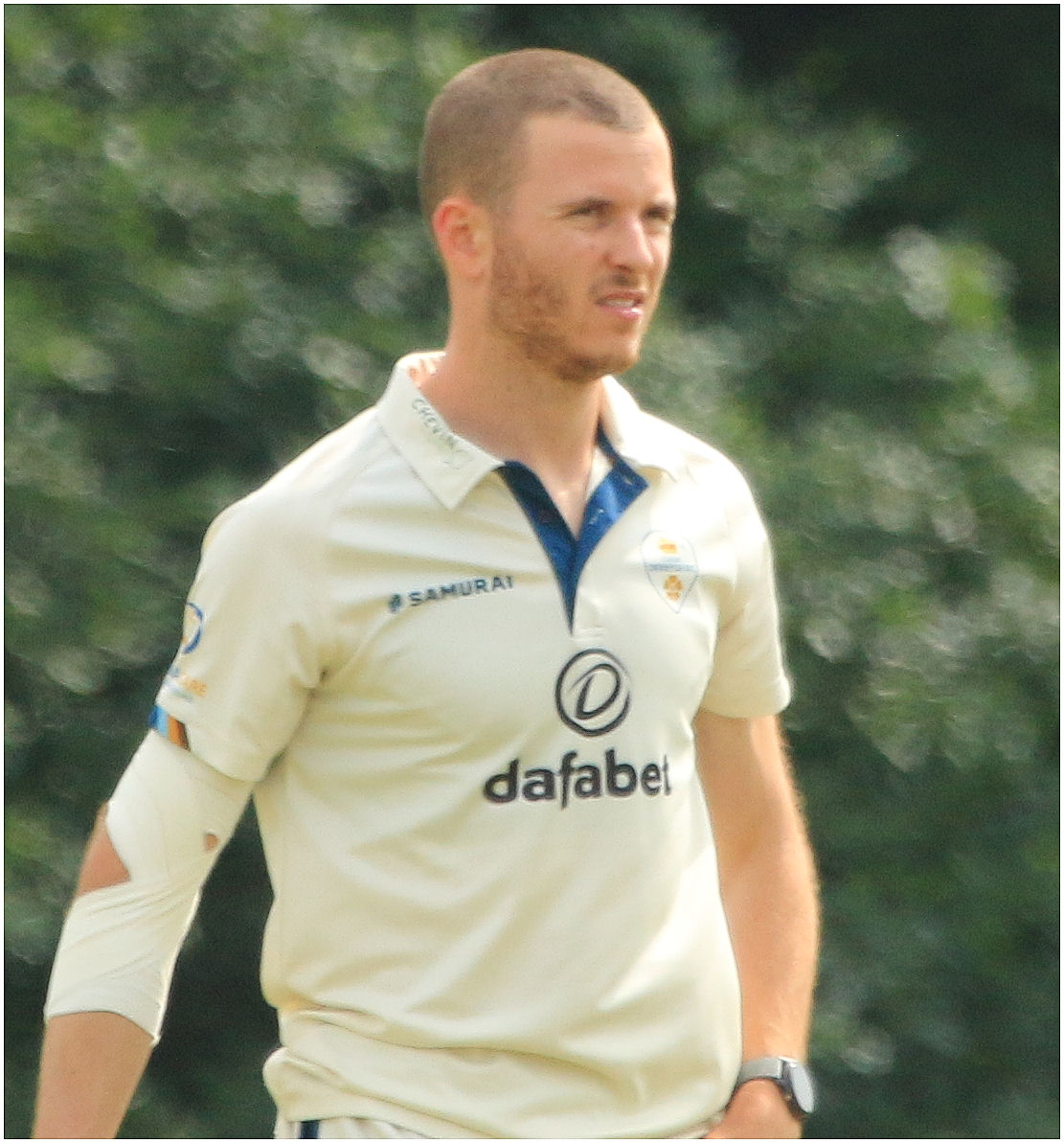
- Potts in 2025

Personal information
- Full name: Nicholas James Potts
- Born: 17 July 2002 (age 24); Burton upon Trent, Staffordshire, England
- Batting: Right-handed
- Bowling: Right-arm medium-fast
- Role: Bowler

Domestic team information
- Years: Team
- 2022–present: Derbyshire (squad no. 26)
- First-class debut: 14 April 2022 Derbyshire v Sussex
- List A debut: 2 August 2022 Derbyshire v Glamorgan

Career statistics
Competition	FC	LA	T20
Matches	14	18	13
Runs scored	248	106	98
Batting average	14.58	17.66	14.00
100s/50s	0/1	0/0	0/0
Top score	57	27	35
Balls bowled	1,590	802	232
Wickets	28	25	16
Bowling average	40.39	38.24	25.43
5 wickets in innings	0	0	0
10 wickets in match	0	0	0
Best bowling	4/50	4/39	3/29
Catches/stumpings	3/–	6/–	4/–
- Source: Cricinfo, 27 September 2026

Nicholas James Potts (born 17 July 2002) is an English cricketer who plays for Derbyshire.

In November 2020, at the age of eighteen, Potts signed a rookie contract with Derbyshire, and had previously played for the Young Lions. In August 2021, Potts signed a three-year deal with Derbyshire, after coming through the club's academy system. Potts had been hampered by an ankle injury, which had only allowed him to play in four matches for Derbyshire's second XI team in 2021. Derbyshire's head of cricket, Dave Houghton said that Potts is a "talent for the future".

In April 2022, at the start of the 2022 English cricket season, Potts played in a warm-up match for Derbyshire against Oxford University Cricket Club, as part of the Marylebone Cricket Club University Matches. Potts took two wickets in the match, including that of opener Joe Gordon.

Potts made his first-class debut on 14 April 2022, for Derbyshire against Sussex in Division Two of the 2022 County Championship. Electing to bat first, Derbyshire made 505/8 in their innings before declaring, with Potts scoring nine runs. In the next innings, Potts was the leading wicket-taker for Derbyshire, taking three wickets for 43 runs, including that of the Sussex captain Tom Haines. Sussex were bowled out for 174 runs and were forced to follow-on. However, in their second innings, Sussex batted out a draw, making 513 runs for the loss of just three wickets. Potts effected a run out, and again took the wicket of Sussex's captain, but not before Haines had made 243 runs.
