= Jack White (cricketer, born 1992) =

English cricketer (born 1992)

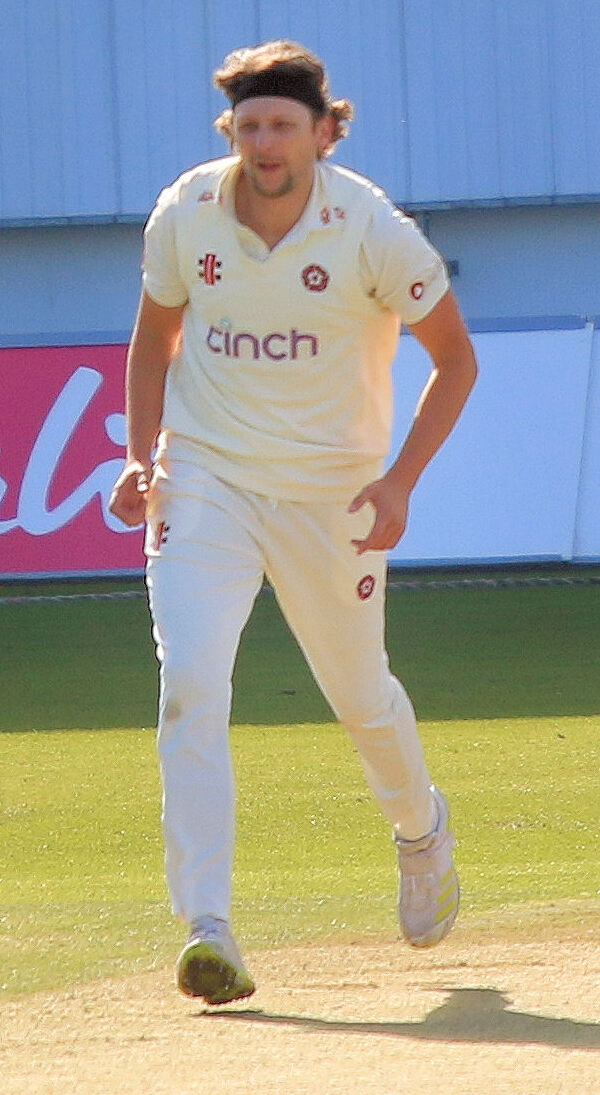
- White in 2024

Personal information
- Full name: Curtley-Jack White
- Born: 19 February 1992 (age 34); Kendal, Cumbria, England
- Batting: Left-handed
- Bowling: Right-arm fast-medium
- Role: Bowler

Domestic team information
- Years: Team
- 2018–2024: Northamptonshire (squad no. 9)
- 2025–2026: Yorkshire (squad no. 19)
- First-class debut: 1 August 2020 Northamptonshire v Warwickshire
- List A debut: 28 July 2021 Northamptonshire v Yorkshire

Career statistics
Competition	FC	LA	T20
Matches	60	34	7
Runs scored	346	93	13
Batting average	8.87	10.33	13.00
100s/50s	0/1	0/0	0/0
Top score	59	29	13
Balls bowled	9,876	1,551	144
Wickets	190	44	12
Bowling average	24.32	28.15	17.08
5 wickets in innings	7	0	0
10 wickets in match	0	0	0
Best bowling	6/38	4/20	4/33
Catches/stumpings	7/–	7/–	2/–
- Source: Cricinfo, 26 September 2026

Curtley-Jack White (born 19 February 1992) is an English cricketer.

== Career ==
He made his first-class debut on 1 August 2020, for Northamptonshire in the 2020 Bob Willis Trophy. He made his List A debut on 28 July 2021, for Northamptonshire in the 2021 Royal London One-Day Cup. In July 2022, during the 2022 County Championship match against Lancashire, White took his maiden five-wicket haul in first-class cricket. In November 2024, he left Northamptonshire and joined Yorkshire on a two-year contract. In February 2026, White agreed a contract extension keeping him at Yorkshire until at least the end of the 2028 season.
