= Ben Gibbon =

English cricketer

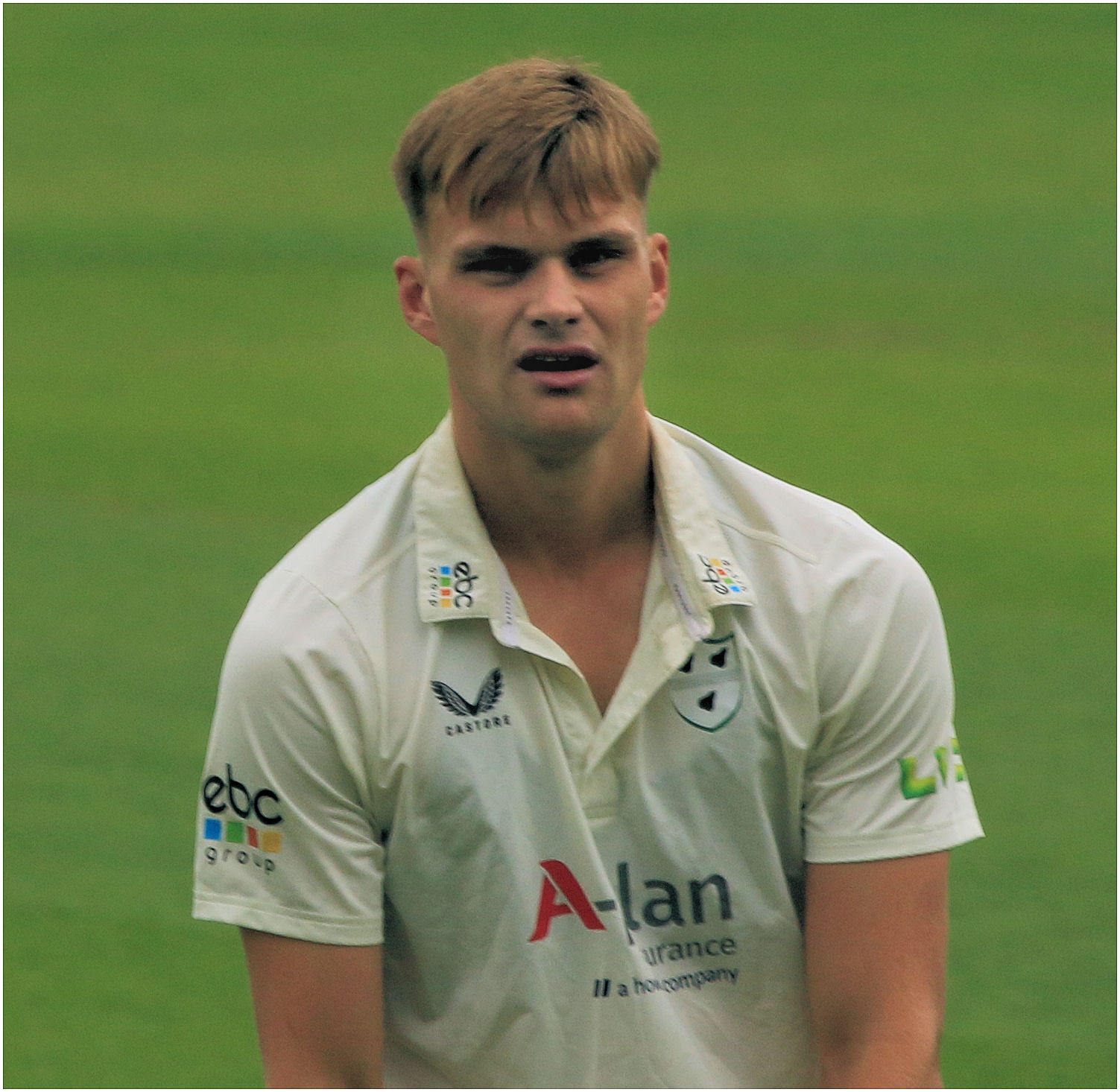
- Gibbon in 2023

Personal information
- Full name: Benjamin James Gibbon
- Born: 9 June 2000 (age 26); Chester, Cheshire, England
- Batting: Right-handed
- Bowling: Left-arm fast-medium
- Role: Bowler

Domestic team information
- Years: Team
- 2022–present: Worcestershire

Career statistics
Competition	FC	LA	T20
Matches	25	17	1
Runs scored	330	41	–
Batting average	19.41	6.83	–
100s/50s	0/1	0/0	–/–
Top score	75	13*	–
Balls bowled	3,562	829	12
Wickets	60	25	0
Bowling average	39.80	35.68	–
5 wickets in innings	0	0	–
10 wickets in match	0	0	–
Best bowling	4/28	3/58	–
Catches/stumpings	13/–	8/–	2/–
- Source: Cricinfo, 27 September 2026

Benjamin James Gibbon (born 9 June 2000) is an English cricketer who plays for Worcestershire. Before signing his contract with Worcestershire, Gibbon had played for Cheshire in the National Counties Cricket Championship, where he was named their Bowler of the Year.

Gibbon was born in Chester, and worked on construction sites as a builder. He began to play cricket in 2018. In September 2021, Gibbon signed his first professional contract, with a two-year deal with Worcestershire. Prior to signing his contract, he had already played for Worcestershire in the Second XI Championship. A month before signing his contract, he took a five-wicket haul for Cheshire against Wiltshire in the 2021 National Counties Championship at Moss Lane, Alderley Edge. Paul Pridgeon, Worcestershire's Steering Group Chairman said that Gibbon has "a lot of potential" and that he "brings something different to our group of bowlers".

Gibbon made his first-class debut on 5 May 2022, for Worcestershire against Durham in the 2022 County Championship. In the first innings of the match, he took two wickets, included that of Scott Borthwick, the captain of Durham. Two months before his debut, Gibbon said that he would "like to break into the first team" and that his "ambition is to be a professional".
