= Josh Bohannon =

English cricketer (born 1997)

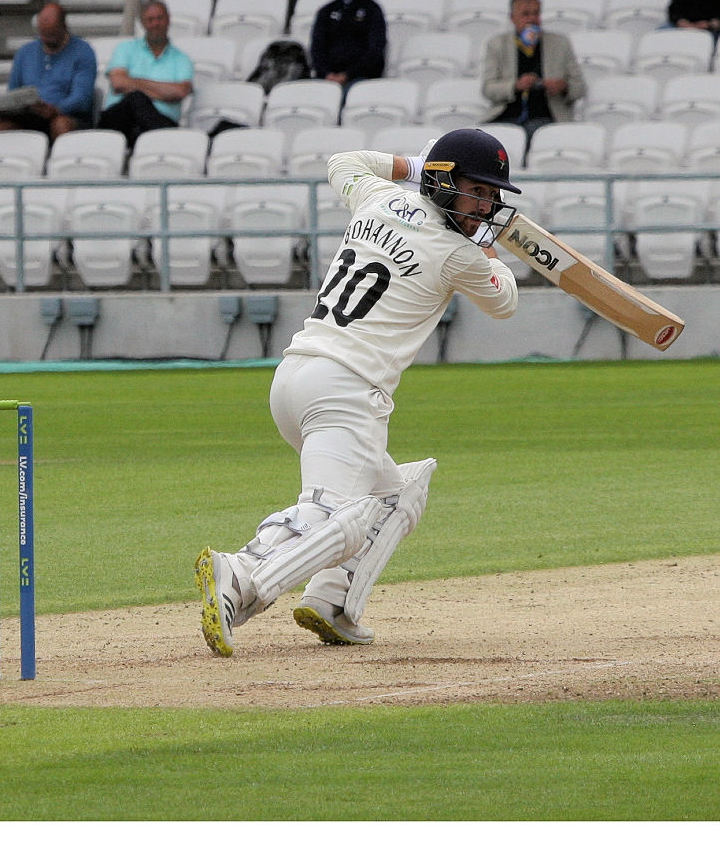
- Bohannon in 2021

Personal information
- Full name: Joshua James Bohannon
- Born: 9 April 1997 (age 29); Bolton, Manchester, England
- Batting: Right-handed
- Bowling: Right-arm medium-fast
- Role: Batsman

Domestic team information
- Years: Team
- 2017–present: Lancashire (squad no. 20)
- First-class debut: 19 August 2018 Lancashire v Surrey
- List A debut: 25 May 2018 Lancashire v Warwickshire

Career statistics
Competition	FC	LA	T20
Matches	110	60	38
Runs scored	6,621	1,737	262
Batting average	41.12	34.74	10.91
100s/50s	15/27	4/7	0/0
Top score	231	147	39
Balls bowled	1,313	201	–
Wickets	18	1	–
Bowling average	41.94	248.00	–
5 wickets in innings	0	0	–
10 wickets in match	0	0	–
Best bowling	3/46	1/33	–
Catches/stumpings	50/–	14/–	15/–
- Source: Cricinfo, 27 September 2026

Joshua James Bohannon (born 9 April 1997) is an English cricketer who plays for Lancashire County Cricket Club.

== Career ==
Bohannon made his List A debut for Lancashire in the 2018 Royal London One-Day Cup on 25 May 2018. He made his Twenty20 debut for Lancashire in the 2018 t20 Blast on 3 August 2018. He made his first-class debut for Lancashire in the 2018 County Championship on 17 August 2018, playing against Surrey he scored a half-century batting at number 8.

In September 2019, Bohannon reached his maiden first-class century, going on to make 174 against Derbyshire.

Bohannon was Lancashire's leading runscorer during the 2021 County Championship season with 853 runs at an average of 53.31.

In April 2022, in the County Championship, Bohannon scored his maiden double century in first-class cricket, with an innings of 231 against Gloucestershire.

In August 2022, he was discussed as a candidate for a Test debut in the England cricket team.

Bohannon made his first List A century against Kent, with a score of 105 on 9 August 2023.

In the 2023 County Championship, Bohannon was the leading run scorer of division 1 with 1257 runs at an average of 59.85. Following the season he signed a new deal with Lancashire till 2026.

== Role ==
Bohannon is a right handed top order batter who also bowls at medium pace.
