= Tom Clark (cricketer, born 2001) =

English cricketer (born 2001)

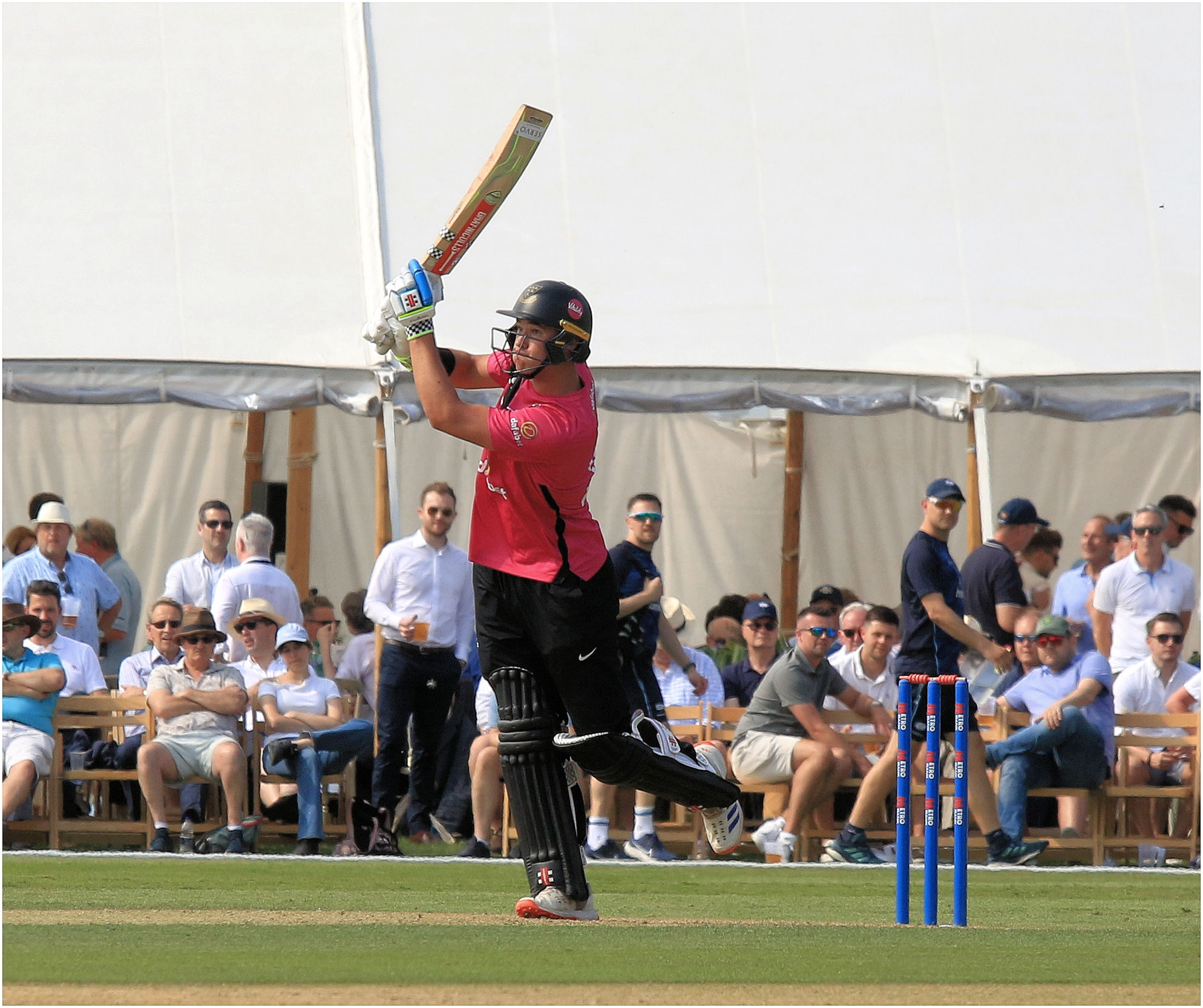
- Clark in 2024

Personal information
- Full name: Thomas Geoffrey Reeves Clark
- Born: 27 February 2001 (age 25); Haywards Heath, West Sussex, England
- Batting: Left-handed
- Bowling: Right-arm medium
- Role: Batsman

Domestic team information
- Years: Team
- 2019–present: Sussex (squad no. 27)
- First-class debut: 23 September 2019 Sussex v Worcestershire
- List A debut: 23 July 2021 Sussex v Lancashire

Career statistics
Competition	FC	LA	T20
Matches	69	33	39
Runs scored	3,135	999	860
Batting average	27.26	31.21	26.06
100s/50s	5/16	2/4	0/2
Top score	140	139	79
Balls bowled	1,863	222	4
Wickets	26	3	0
Bowling average	41.80	68.66	–
5 wickets in innings	0	0	–
10 wickets in match	0	0	–
Best bowling	3/17	1/7	–
Catches/stumpings	82/–	18/–	23/–
- Source: Cricinfo, 26 September 2026

Thomas Geoffrey Reeves Clark (born 27 February 2001) is an English cricketer. He made his first-class debut on 23 September 2019, for Sussex in the 2019 County Championship. Before his first-class debut, Clark had played for the England under-19 cricket team. In October 2019, he was named in the England under-19 cricket team's squad for a 50-over tri-series in the Caribbean. In December 2019, he was named in England's squad for the 2020 Under-19 Cricket World Cup. He made his List A debut on 23 July 2021, for Sussex in the 2021 Royal London One-Day Cup.

In April 2022, in the opening round of matches in the 2022 County Championship, Clark scored his maiden century in first-class cricket, with 100 runs against Nottinghamshire.
