= Ed Barnes (cricketer) =

English cricketer (born 1997)

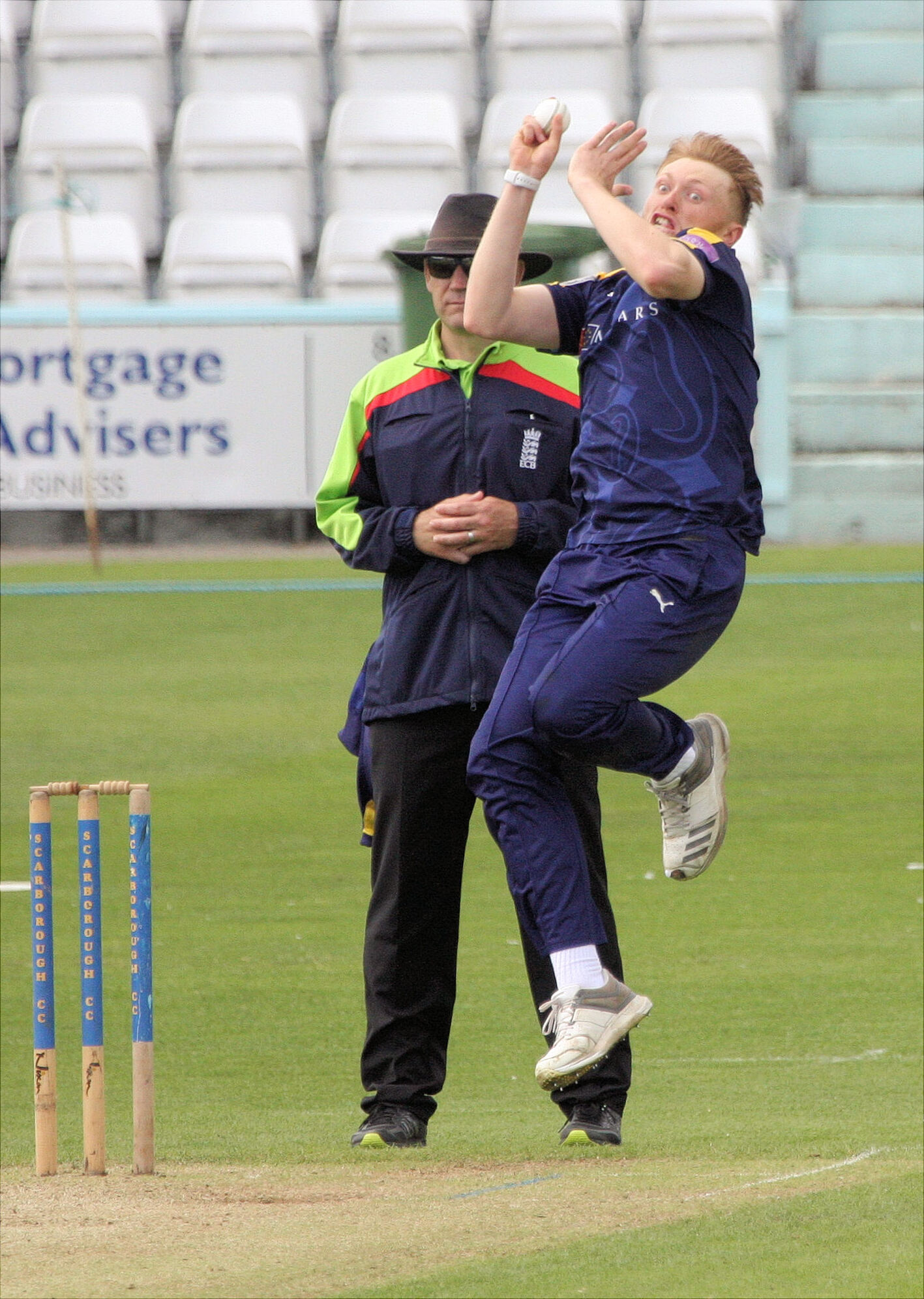
- Barnes in 2019

Personal information
- Full name: Edward Barnes
- Born: 26 November 1997 (age 28); York, North Yorkshire, England
- Batting: Right-handed
- Bowling: Right-arm fast-medium

Domestic team information
- Years: Team
- 2020: Yorkshire (squad no. 62)
- 2020: → Derbyshire (on loan)
- 2021–2023: Leicestershire (squad no. 62)
- FC debut: 8 August 2020 Derbyshire v Leicestershire
- LA debut: 22 July 2021 Leicestershire v Derbyshire

Career statistics
Competition	FC	LA	T20
Matches	25	12	6
Runs scored	540	77	7
Batting average	20.76	19.25	7.00
100s/50s	0/2	0/0	0/0
Top score	83*	33*	7
Balls bowled	2,943	566	78
Wickets	42	15	2
Bowling average	45.50	37.33	79.50
5 wickets in innings	1	0	0
10 wickets in match	0	0	0
Best bowling	5/101	2/32	2/27
Catches/stumpings	9/–	3/–	1/–
- Source: Cricinfo, 30 September 2023

Edward Barnes (born 26 November 1997) is an English cricketer who most recently played for Leicestershire. He also played for England at the Under-19 level. He made his first-class debut on 8 August 2020, for Derbyshire in the 2020 Bob Willis Trophy. He made his Twenty20 debut on 31 August 2020, for Derbyshire in the 2020 T20 Blast. He made his List A debut on 22 July 2021, for Leicestershire in the 2021 Royal London One-Day Cup. In April 2022, in the 2022 County Championship, Barnes took his maiden five-wicket haul in first-class cricket, with 5 for 101 against Derbyshire.
