= Liam Trevaskis =

English cricketer (born 1999)

Personal information
- Born: 18 April 1999 (age 27); Carlisle, Cumbria, England
- Batting: Left-handed
- Bowling: Slow left-arm orthodox

Domestic team information
- Years: Team
- 2017–2023: Durham (squad no. 80)
- 2024–2026: Leicestershire (squad no. 80)
- First-class debut: 25 September 2017 Durham v Worcestershire
- List A debut: 17 April 2019 Durham v Northamptonshire

Career statistics
Competition	FC	LA	T20
Matches	38	49	88
Runs scored	1,376	769	473
Batting average	29.91	24.03	13.13
100s/50s	0/10	0/4	0/0
Top score	88	76*	31*
Balls bowled	4,783	2,110	1,642
Wickets	52	55	72
Bowling average	47.48	34.07	30.26
5 wickets in innings	3	1	0
10 wickets in match	0	0	0
Best bowling	6/85	5/52	4/16
Catches/stumpings	14/–	14/–	50/–
- Source: Cricinfo, 12 July 2026

Liam Trevaskis (born 18 April 1999) is an English cricketer. He made his Twenty20 cricket debut for Durham in the 2017 NatWest t20 Blast on 25 July 2017. He made his first-class debut for Durham in the 2017 County Championship on 25 September 2017. He made his List A debut on 17 April 2019, for Durham in the 2019 Royal London One-Day Cup.
