= Michael Burgess (cricketer) =

English cricketer (born 1994)

Personal information
- Full name: Michael Gregory Kerran Burgess
- Born: 8 July 1994 (age 32); Epsom, Surrey, England
- Batting: Right-handed
- Role: Wicket-keeper

Domestic team information
- Years: Team
- 2014–2016: Loughborough MCCU
- 2015–2016: Leicestershire (squad no. 20)
- 2017–2019: Sussex (squad no. 5)
- 2019: → Warwickshire (on loan)
- 2020–2024: Warwickshire (squad no. 61)
- 2023: → Sussex (on loan)
- FC debut: 1 April 2014 Loughborough MCCU v Sussex
- LA debut: 29 July 2015 Leicestershire v Northants

Career statistics
| Competition | FC | LA | T20 |
|---|---|---|---|
| Matches | 93 | 51 | 66 |
| Runs scored | 4,440 | 1,243 | 791 |
| Batting average | 35.80 | 30.31 | 17.97 |
| 100s/50s | 7/23 | 0/9 | 0/2 |
| Top score | 178 | 93 | 64* |
| Catches/stumpings | 210/11 | 49/5 | 26/12 |
- Source: Cricinfo, 30 September 2024

Michael Gregory Kerran Burgess (born 8 July 1994) is an English former cricketer who played for Warwickshire County Cricket Club. A wicketkeeper batsman, Burgess came through the academy of Surrey County Cricket Club, making a total of 31 appearances at 2nd XI level between 2011 and 2013.

== Career ==
Burgess made his first-class cricket debut for Loughborough MCCU against Sussex at Hove. In April 2015 in a non first-class game Burgess scored 116 against a Kent attack including first XI players Matt Coles and Adam Riley. Later that year he made his List A cricket debut for Leicestershire versus Northamptonshire, in his second list A match he was again run out on 49 versus Gloucestershire. In May 2016 Burgess scored 98 against the touring Sri Lankans in a first-class match.

He was released by Leicestershire at the end of the 2016 season, joining Sussex County Cricket Club on a non-contract basis in March 2017. A series of good performances with bat and gloves in both red and white ball formats led to the award of a one-year contract in August of that year. This was promptly extended for a further year after he hit a career-best 146 versus Nottinghamshire in the final County Championship match of the season at Hove. He moved to Warwickshire CCC in May 2019, his opportunities at Sussex being limited by Ben Brown establishing himself as their first-choice keeper in all three formats in 2021. Burgess hit a career-best 178 at the start of the 2022 season playing for Warwickshire against Surrey.

Burgess played club cricket for Cheam and Reigate Priory in the ECB Premier Division of the Surrey Championships as well as for the University of Adelaide in the South Australian Cricket Association.

== Post-retirement ==
Burgess is a graduate of Loughborough University.

In November 2024, Burgess retired from professional cricket. After retirement he worked for London-based Marine-Broker firm Howe Robinson Partners as a Dry Cargo shipbroker. He lives in London and works as an account handler for Miller's Sports & Entertainment team.
