= Tom Haines =

English cricketer (born 1998)

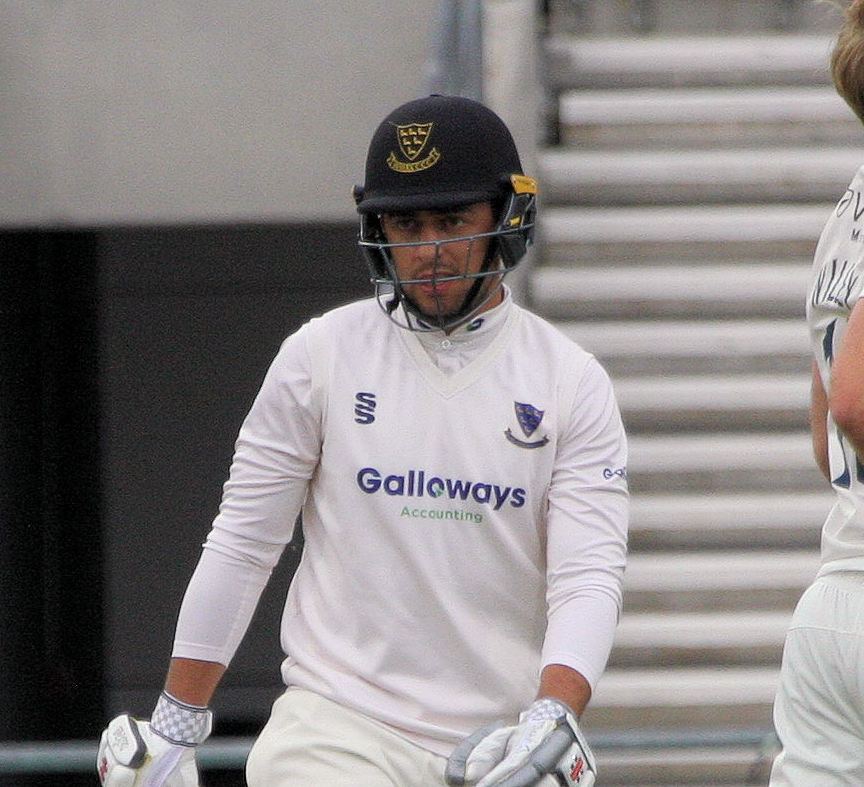
- Haines batting for Sussex CCC in June 2021

Personal information
- Full name: Thomas Jacob Haines
- Born: 28 October 1998 (age 28); Crawley, West Sussex, England
- Batting: Left-handed
- Bowling: Right-arm medium
- Role: Batsman

Domestic team information
- Years: Team
- 2016–present: Sussex (squad no. 20)
- FC debut: 31 August 2016 Sussex v Kent
- List A debut: 23 July 2021 Sussex v Lancashire

Career statistics
| Competition | FC | LA | T20 |
|---|---|---|---|
| Matches | 103 | 32 | 4 |
| Runs scored | 6,428 | 1,203 | 52 |
| Batting average | 37.15 | 37.59 | 13.00 |
| 100s/50s | 16/29 | 2/7 | 0/0 |
| Top score | 243 | 129 | 27 |
| Balls bowled | 3,506 | 120 | – |
| Wickets | 40 | 1 | – |
| Bowling average | 42.25 | 122.00 | – |
| 5 wickets in innings | 0 | 0 | – |
| 10 wickets in match | 0 | 0 | – |
| Best bowling | 3/5 | 1/22 | – |
| Catches/stumpings | 56/– | 13/– | 0/– |
- Source: Cricinfo, 26 September 2026

Thomas Jacob Haines (born 28 October 1998) is an English cricketer who plays for Sussex County Cricket Club. He is a left-handed top-order batsman who also bowls right-arm medium pace.

== Career ==
Haines made his List A debut on 23 July 2021, for Sussex in the 2021 Royal London One-Day Cup.

In September 2021, Haines became the first batsman to score 1,000 runs in the 2021 County Championship. He has attributed his improved form to increased practice.

In April 2022, in the 2022 County Championship, Haines scored his maiden double century in first-class cricket, with 243 runs against Derbyshire. Along with Cheteshwar Pujara, Haines became the first batters to score double centuries in the same innings of a first-class match while following-on. He made his Twenty20 debut on 3 July 2022, for Sussex in the 2022 T20 Blast.

Haines signed a new three-year contract with Sussex in December 2024.

In November 2022, Haines was included in the England Lions squad for their trip to the UAE. In the following years he was called up consistently as an opening batsman, often captaining the side.
